= Rurouni Kenshin: Trust & Betrayal =

Japanese OVA series

- Key visual, featuring Yukishiro Tomoe (left), Himura Kenshin (right) and Yukishiro Enishi's eyes (center)
- るろうに剣心 -明治剣客浪漫譚- 追憶編; Rurōni Kenshin -Meiji Kenkaku Rōman Tan- Tsuioku-hen
- Also known as: Samurai X: Trust & Betrayal
- Type: OVA
- Genre: Adventure; Martial arts; Romance
- Based on: Rurouni Kenshin
- Created by: Nobuhiro Watsuki
- Directed by: Kazuhiro Furuhashi
- Series composition: Masashi Sogo
- Character designer: Masahide Yanagisawa
- Music by: Taku Iwasaki
- No. of episodes: 4 (list of episodes)

Production
- Art director: Masami Hagiwara
- Sound director: Shōji Hata
- Cinematographer: Masahide Okino
- Color designer: Shinji Matsumoto
- Editors: Takeshi Seyama; Keiko Mizuta; Megumi Uchida
- Studio: Studio Deen
- Producers: Yoshinori Naruke; Kazunori Noguchi
- Production companies: SPE Visual Works
- Runtime: 29 minutes

Original release
- Release: February 20 – September 22, 1999

Rurouni Kenshin: Trust & Betrayal, known in Japan as Rurōni Kenshin -Meiji Kenkaku Rōman Tan- Tsuioku-hen, (Note: Japanese: るろうに剣心 -明治剣客浪漫譚- 追憶編; 'Rurouni Kenshin: Meiji Swordsman Romantic Story – Recollection (or Reminiscence) Chapter') is a Japanese original video animation (OVA) series, based on Nobuhiro Watsuki's manga series Rurouni Kenshin, and is a prequel to its 1996–1998 anime series adaptation. Trust & Betrayal chronicles the story of Himura Kenshin as the Hitokiri Battōsai during the final years of the Bakumatsu era while also revealing the origins of his cross-shaped scar and exploring his relationship with a woman named Yukishiro Tomoe. The OVA consists of four episodes that were released from February to September of 1999, later being compiled into a two-hour feature-length film.

The OVA series was first licensed by ADV Films for home video release in North America and the United Kingdom, and by Madman Entertainment for release in Australasia, under the title Samurai X: Trust & Betrayal. In 2003, the film edition was released in North America on DVD by ADV Films. After ADV Films closed in 2009, Aniplex of America licensed the OVA series for a Blu-ray release in North America under its original title, Rurouni Kenshin: Trust & Betrayal.

Trust & Betrayal has been praised for its story, animation, art, music and Japanese voice acting.

== Plot ==
During a bandit raid that leaves a group of travelers dead, a young boy named Shinta is spared and rescued by the swordsman Hiko Seijūrō, a master of the legendary Hiten Mitsurugi-ryū style. Impressed by Shinta's act of burying both the victims and their attackers, Hiko takes him as an apprentice, renaming him Kenshin—a name he deems more fitting for a swordsman.

After years of training, Kenshin abandons his master in a heated dispute, believing he must join the revolutionary forces opposing the Tokugawa shogunate to fulfill Hiten Mitsurugi's oath of protecting the weak. He enlists with the Choshu clan's Kiheitai under Takasugi Shinsaku, later serving as an assassin for Katsura Kogorō alongside I'izuka, the clan's execution examiner. Kenshin gains notoriety as the feared "Hitokiri Battōsai", but during one mission, he kills Kiyosato Akira, a bodyguard whose dying strike leaves the first half of Kenshin's cross-shaped scar. Soon after, he encounters Yukishiro Tomoe, unaware she is Kiyosato's fiancée. Though conflicted, Kenshin spares her and brings her to his hideout. Katsura grows suspicious of a spy within the Choshu ranks after an assassin targets Kenshin—a secret known only to a select few.

Following the Ikedaya incident, Katsura relocates Kenshin and Tomoe to the village of Otsu, where they pose as a married couple. Over time, their relationship deepens, though unbeknownst to Kenshin, Tomoe had initially conspired with shogunate agents to avenge Kiyosato. Her brother, Yukishiro Enishi, alerts her to the approaching assassins, but by then, Tomoe has fallen in love with Kenshin. She attempts to dissuade the attackers but fails. Meanwhile, I'izuka—revealed as the true spy—manipulates Kenshin into confronting Tomoe, exposing her past ties to Kiyosato.

Distraught, Kenshin battles the shogunate agents but is gravely wounded. As their leader delivers a fatal strike, Tomoe intervenes, only for Kenshin's blade to accidentally kill her. With her dying breath, she completes his scar. Devastated, Kenshin vows to fight for Katsura's vision of a new era, then dedicate himself to protecting the innocent—without taking another life. Katsura later informs him that Shishio Makoto has replaced him as an assassin and dealt with I'izuka.

As the shogunate collapses, Kenshin briefly clashes with Shinsengumi captains Okita Sōji and Saitō Hajime, his future rival. After the war, the Hitokiri Battōsai vanishes, and Kenshin returns to the graves of the travelers he buried as a child, leaving Tomoe's scarf as a tribute. Later, Hiko discovers the scarf, recognizing that Kenshin has finally learned his lesson.

== Cast ==
Character	Japanese voice	English voice
Himura Kenshin; Shinta	Mayo Suzukaze; Masami Suzuki	J. Shannon Weaver; Katherine Catmull
Yukishiro Tomoe	Junko Iwao	Rebecca Davis
Yukishiro Enishi	Nozomu Sasaki	Brian Gaston
Hiko Seijūrō	Shūichi Ikeda	Joe York
Katsura Kogorō	Tomokazu Seki	Corey M. Gagne
Takasugi Shinsaku	Wataru Takagi	Jason B. Phelps
Saitō Hajime	Hirotaka Suzuoki	Ken Webster
Okita Sōji	Akari Hibino	J. Shannon Weaver
Kiyosato Akira	Tetsuya Iwanaga	Ray Clayton
Iizuka	Ryūsei Nakao	Lowell Bartholomee
Katagai	Mitsuaki Hoshino	Douglas Taylor
Tatsumi	Minoru Uchida	John Paul Shephard
Ikumatsu	Hiromi Setsu	Lara Toner
Hijikata Toshizō	Rikiya Koyama	
Kondō Isami	Hiroshi Takahashi	
Shigekura Jūbei	Satoshi Tsuruoka	Charles C. Campbell
Landlady	Shizuka Okohira	Lainie Frasier

== Production ==
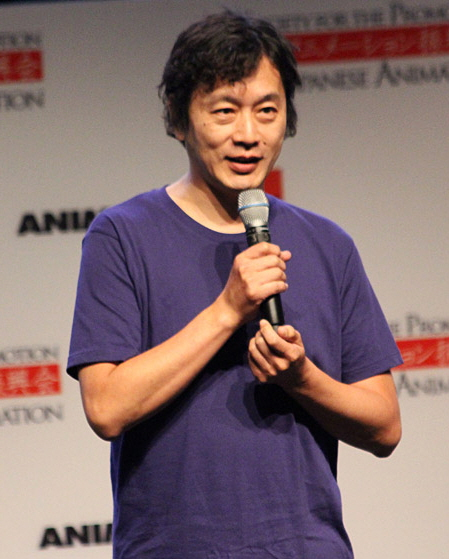
Director Kazuhiro Furuhashi returned from the 1990s TV series to make Trust & Betrayal

Director Kazuhiro Furuhashi returned from the 1990s Rurouni Kenshin television series and requested Masahide Yanagisawa to design the character based on his skills. Masashi Sogo worked for the screenplay. Another staff member was Yuji Mitsuya who worked as recording director. Furuhashi took liberty with the animation and often did stares from Yukishiro Enishi's point of view to see his sister die. While the OVAs are notorious for its violence, Furuhashi decided to use only the first episode as a major delivery of Kenshin's murders in order to tone down the gore. Nevertheless, Furuhashi aimed to make the fights realistic to give the viewers a disturbed impression whenever somebody is cut and the symbolism in Kenshin's scar. Furuhashi was mainly influenced by the drama Hissatsu when making the OVA. In order to contrast the style of the television series, Furuhashi watched Zatoichi movies. He also used influences from Akira Kurosawa's works and the novel Rashomon. Furuhashi wanted to make the art more realistic, resulting in kimonos and hakama moving in a different fashion too.

Daryl Surat of Otaku USA stated that this series uses a more "realistic" art style than the television series uses, and that the series has "graphic, bloody violence galore" beginning in the opening sequence. The decision to have Tomoe manually give Kenshin his second scar was the original decision for the manga. Furuhashi revealed that Nobuhiro Watsuki told him the original idea during a phone call during the middle of the original anime's production. Furuhashi did not expect Watsuki to change his mind and was confused when he saw the manga version so he decided to stick to the original plan. Nevertheless, Furuhashi also wanted to remind viewers of the style of the television series by often featuring flowers and leave the impression of a period drama. In order to focus more on Kenshin and Tomoe's romance especially with the former's focus on bloodshed, the director decided to make one scene of the latter menstruating and symbolize her conflicted feelings towards her husband. In contrast to common romantic stories, Furuhashi was interested in showing a married couple dealing with everyday's lives and keep focus on the fact that the wife might want to kill her husband. The antagonists facing Kenshin were written to give a major threat to the protagonist in the fourth episode and symbolize more the theme of the end of the Edo period to show both sides have their own fair side.

One of the major themes of Trust is understanding the repercussions and after-effects murder can have, something that Kenshin has yet to comprehend though others have tried to point it out to him.

== Release ==
Digipak art of the Blu-ray collection illustrated by Atsuko Nakajima

Rurouni Kenshin: Trust & Betrayal was directed by Kazuhiro Furuhashi, with the screenplay written by Masashi Sogo, and animated by Studio Deen. The four episodes were first released on four VHS sets by SPE Visual Works from February 20 to September 22, 1999. A "Director's Cut" volume, which included the four episodes, was later released on VHS on November 20, 1999, and on DVD on December 18 of that same year. It was later released in four DVD sets on March 23, 2001. Aniplex launched a Blu-ray set on August 24, 2011.

In North America, the OVA was licensed by A.D. Vision and released under the title Samurai X: Trust & Betrayal. The company first released the series in two VHS sets; Trust on August 22, 2000, and Betrayal on November 14 of the same year. It was released on two DVDs on October 10 and November 7, 2000. The "Director's Cut" DVD volume was released on May 20, 2003. Aniplex of America released the OVA on a Blu-ray set, under the title Rurouni Kenshin: Trust & Betrayal, on August 23, 2011.

In Australia and New Zealand, the OVA was released by Madman Entertainment on two DVD sets on December 4, 2000, and March 20, 2001. In the United Kingdom, two DVDs were released by A.D. Vision on January 27 and March 17, 2003.

=== Music ===
The music for Trust & Betrayal was composed by Taku Iwasaki. A soundtrack album, containing 16 tracks, was released on March 20, 1999.

== Reception ==
Trust & Betrayal's story, animation, art, music and Japanese voice acting have all been heavily praised by various critics and, consequently, the series itself has been widely acknowledged as a masterpiece and one of anime's crowning achievements.

THEM Anime Reviews gave the entire OVA series a perfect score of 5 out of 5 stars, with reviewer Tim Jones stating, "powerful, evocative, saddening, and heavily charged, Rurouni Kenshin: Trust & Betrayal is a series that goes far beyond its comic-book origins, testing the limits of not only its franchise, but the medium of original video animation as a storytelling device. Furthermore, while it surpasses the original television series in many ways, it remains complementary and insightful to why Kenshin becomes the way he is. After all, nothing builds character quite so well as a stirring tragedy. It doesn't get much more tragic or stirring than this." He summarised the series as "dramatic, tragic, beautiful" and "a sterling example of Japanese animation at its finest".

Trust & Betrayal has received significant praise from Anime News Network reviewers. Mike Crandol noted it as one of the greatest OVA series of all time, celebrating the new characters designs as well as the fights scenes which were also noted to be "terribly bloody" and beautiful at the same time. In his review, Carl Kimlinger described the series as "stirring, devastating, smart, redemptive and pure perfection" and gave the series an 'A+' rating for the subbed version and an 'A' rating for the dub. Bamboo Dong claimed that watching this series would benefit the viewer with a "stunning overall experience" before finishing off that "Rurouni Kenshin: Tsuioku Hen is a masterpiece, with dramatic visuals and beautiful animation".

Animerica reviewer Rio Yañez praised Trust's "introspective take on violence" as well as its being "chock-full of insane samurai sword fights and free-flying appendages" while avoiding stereotypical freeze frame animation. While considering the violence "over the top", he felt it was well handled, avoiding being excessive or gratuitous, and that the action scenes were "well balanced by the lavish background paintings and designs". He did criticize ADV Film's English dub as "kung fu style dubbing", noting that the voice actors frequently mispronounced the Japanese names and left the voice track mildly confusing despite the English script's serious take of the material.

DVD Talk reviewer Don Houston found the OVA's story and music solid. The director's cut version received positive comments by how the four OVAs were arranged with Houston commenting it "seems more like a movie that stands alone, rather than just the precursor to a long lasting series."

Daryl Surat of Otaku USA said that, despite what Dave Riley said, viewers should watch the television series before watching Trust & Betrayal. Surat explained that the OVA has "great moments" that a viewer unfamiliar with the television series would not "bat an eye toward."

== See also ==
- Rurouni Kenshin: The Beginning (2021), a live-action film adaptation of the same storyline
