= List of Rurouni Kenshin (1996 TV series) episodes =

Cover of the first DVD volume featuring (from front to back) Himura Kenshin, Kamiya Kaoru, and Myōjin Yahiko

The 1996 Rurouni Kenshin anime is the adaptation of the manga series Rurouni Kenshin by Nobuhiro Watsuki. Situated during the early Meiji period in Japan, the story tells about a fictional assassin named Kenshin Himura, who becomes a wanderer to protect the people of Japan.

The anime, directed by Kazuhiro Furuhashi, began airing on Japan's Fuji TV on January 10, 1996, and ended on September 8, 1998. It was produced by SME Visual Works and Fuji TV, and was animated from episode 1 to 66 by Studio Gallop, whereas the episodes from 67 onwards were animated by Studio Deen. The final episode did not air in Japan, but was a bonus episode for the VHS and DVD releases. The TV series was later licensed in North America by Media Blasters, who split it up into "seasons", and released on DVD. It started airing in the US on Cartoon Network as a part of the Toonami block on March 17, 2003, but ended at the completion of the "Season 2" (episode 62). Episodes 63–95 did not air, but were included in the DVD release. The twenty-two English DVDs from the series were released from July 18, 2000, to September 24, 2002. Each of them contains four episodes except for the volume 22 which contains five episodes. The "seasons" were later released in three premium "Bento box" DVD boxes on November 18, 2003, March 30 and July 27, 2004. They were released again, but in new packaging as "economy box" sets on November 15, 2005, January 17 and February 14, 2006.

There were 95 episodes in the Rurouni Kenshin's TV series, but there are also two original video animation (OVA) series which have respectively four and two episodes. The first of them, Rurouni Kenshin: Trust & Betrayal was released in 1999 in Japan and in 2003 was collected into a two-hour feature-length motion picture with new animated sequences and released in North America as a Director's Cut DVD. The second OVA is Rurouni Kenshin: Reflection, composed of two episodes that were originally released from December 19, 2001, to March 20, 2002, in Japan. It was later released in the United States by ADV Films in DVD on March 25, 2003, while a Director's Cut edition was later released. Both OVAs were eventually released on Blu-ray Disc by Aniplex of America in 2011.

A two-episode OVA, retelling the story of the second arc/season, Rurouni Kenshin: New Kyoto Arc, was announced in April 2011. The first part premiered on December 17, 2011, and ran at Tokyo's Cinema Sunshine Ikebukuro theater and Osaka's Cine-Libre Umeda theater for one week only. The second part premiered on June 23, 2012.

== Series overview ==
Season	Episodes	Originally released	
Season	Episodes	First released	Last released
1	27	January 10, 1996	October 16, 1996
2	35	October 30, 1996	September 17, 1997
3	33	October 14, 1997	September 8, 1998

== Episodes ==
A note on the "Season" nomenclature:

The "seasons" that comprise the following list correspond to Media Blaster's release of the series in North America. In Japan, Rurouni Kenshin was aired year-round continuously with regular preemptions for sporting events and television specials taking place, and not split into standard seasonal cycles.

=== Season 1 (1996) ===
No. overall	No. in season	Media Blasters titles / Sony titles (Note: The titles on the left are those from the Media Blasters version. The titles on the right are of the Samurai X Sony episodes posted on Crackle.)	Directed by	Written by	Animation directed by	Original release date	American air date
1	1	"The Handsome Swordsman of Legend: A Man who Fights for Love"; Transliteration: "Densetsu no Bikenshi...Ai Yue ni Tatakau Otoko" (Japanese: 伝説の美剣士...愛ゆえに闘う男)	Kazuhiro Furuhashi	Michiru Shimada	Kobayashi Kazuyuki	January 10, 1996	March 17, 2003
2	2	"Kid Samurai: A Big Ordeal and a New Student"; Transliteration: "Gakizamurai Sutta! Monda! de Monkasei" (Japanese: ガキ侍 スッた!モンだ!で門下生)	Directed by : Shin'ichi Matsumi; Storyboarded by : Yoshihiro Takamoto	Michiru Shimada	Mitsunori Murata	January 17, 1996	March 18, 2003
3	3	"Swordsman of Sorrow: The Man Who Slays His Past"; Transliteration: "Kanashimi no Kenshi - Kako o Kiru Otoko" (Japanese: 哀しみの剣士· 過去を斬る男)	Directed by : Akira Shimizu; Storyboarded by : Akitaro Daichi	Michiru Shimada	Toshimitsu Kobayashi	January 24, 1996	March 19, 2003
4	4	"Bad! Introducing Sanosuke, Fighter-for-hire"; Transliteration: "Aku no Ichimonji - Kenkaya Sanosuke Tōjō!" (Japanese: 悪の一文字· ケンカ屋左之助登場!)	Directed by : Hiroshi Tsuruta; Storyboarded by : Hiroyuki Kakudō	Yoshiyuki Suga	Kobayashi Kazuyuki	January 31, 1996	March 20, 2003
5	5	"The Reverse-blade Sword vs. the Zanbatou: Beyond the Battle"; Transliteration: "Sakabatō Tai Zanbatō - Tatakai no Hate ni!" (Japanese: 逆刃刀対斬馬刀· 闘いの果てに!)	Yoshihiro Takamoto	Yoshiyuki Suga	Hironobu Saitō	February 7, 1996	March 21, 2003
6	6	"The Appearance of Kurogasa: Visitor from the Shadows"; Transliteration: "Yami kara no Hōmonsha - Kurogasa Arawaru!" (Japanese: 闇からの訪問者· 黒笠現る!)	Directed by : Naoto Hashimoto; Storyboarded by : Saki Noda	Michiru Shimada	Kobayashi Kazuyuki	February 14, 1996	March 24, 2003
7	7	"Deathmatch under the Moon! Protect the One You Love"; Transliteration: "Gekka no Shitō - Aisuru Hito o Mamore!" (Japanese: 月下の死闘· 愛する人を守れ!)	Directed by : Shunji Yoshida; Storyboarded by : Hiroyuki Kakudō	Michiru Shimada	Moriyasu Taniguchi	February 21, 1996	March 25, 2003
8	8	"A New Battle! The Mysterious Beauty From Nowhere"; Transliteration: "Arata naru Tatakai! Tobikonde kita Nazo no Bijo" (Japanese: 新たなる戦い! 飛び込んできた謎の美女)	Directed by : Akira Shimizu; Storyboarded by : Mamoru Hosoda	Yoshiyuki Suga	Toshimitsu Kobayashi	February 28, 1996	March 26, 2003
9	9	"The Strongest Group of Ninjas: The Horrible Oniwaban Group"; Transliteration: "Saikyō no Shinobi Gundan - Kyōfu no Oniwabanshū!" (Japanese: 最強の忍び軍団· 恐怖の御庭番衆!)	Yoshihiro Takamoto	Yoshiyuki Suga	Yasuhiro Aoki	March 6, 1996	March 27, 2003
10	10	"Aoshi: Someone so Beautiful it's Frightening"; Transliteration: "Aoshi - Utsukushisugiru hodo Kowai Yatsu" (Japanese: 蒼紫· 美しすぎるほど怖い奴)	Directed by : Hiroshi Tsuruta; Storyboarded by : Hiroyuki Kakudō	Yoshiyuki Suga	Hatsuki Tsuji	March 13, 1996	March 28, 2003
11	11	"Farewell, the Strongest Men: The Clash of Light and Shadow"; Transliteration: "Saraba Saikyō no Otokotachi! Hikari to Yami no Gekitotsu" (Japanese: さらば最強の男たち! 光と闇の激突)	Takashi Kobayashi	Yoshiyuki Suga	Kobayashi Kazuyuki	April 24, 1996	March 31, 2003
12	12	"Birth of a Boy Swordsman: The Battle of First Apprentice Yahiko"; Transliteration: "Shōnen Kenshi Tanjō! Ichiban Deshi Yahiko no Tatakai" (Japanese: 少年剣士誕生! 一番弟子 弥彦の戦い)	Directed by : Shunji Yoshida; Storyboarded by : Norio Kashima	Michiru Shimada	Moriyasu Taniguchi	May 1, 1996	April 2, 2003
13	13	"Strive for the Grand Championship: Toramaru's Sumo Battle Log!"; Transliteration: "Mezase Yokozuna Toramaru no Dosukoi Funsenki" (Japanese: めざせ横綱 虎丸のどすこい奮戦記)	Directed by : Akira Shimizu; Storyboarded by : Hiroyuki Kakudō	Yoshiyuki Suga	Toshimitsu Kobayashi	May 8, 1996	April 3, 2003
14	14	"To Save a Small Life"/ "Lady Doctor Megumi to the Rescue"; Transliteration: "Chiisana Inochi o Sukue! Bijin Joi - Megumi no Chōsen" (Japanese: 小さな命を救え! 美人女医·恵の挑戦)	Yoshihiro Takamoto	Nobuaki Kishima	Yasuhiro Aoki	May 15, 1996	January 24, 2004
15	15	"Assassination Group of Fire"/ "Jinpuu Squad on the Run"; Transliteration: "Honō no Ansatsu Shūdan, Jinpūtai Hashiru!" (Japanese: 炎の暗殺集団, 神風隊走る!)	Directed by : Jun Fukuda; Storyboarded by : Akihiro Enomoto	Yoshiyuki Suga	Akihiro Enomoto	May 22, 1996	April 4, 2003
16	16	"A Promise From the Heart"/ "The Secret Sword Technique of Shiden"; Transliteration: "Yūki Aru Chikai! Moeyo Hiken - Shiden no Tachi" (Japanese: 勇気ある誓い! 燃えよ秘剣·紫電の太刀)	Directed by : Hiroshi Tsuruta; Storyboarded by : Hiroyuki Kakudō	Yoshiyuki Suga	Ikkō Kobayashi	June 5, 1996	April 7, 2003
17	17	"Fly to Your Dreams"/ "The Adventures of Marimo, the Human Bullet"; Transliteration: "Yume ni Mukatte Tobe! Hōdan Musume Marimo no Bōken" (Japanese: 夢に向かって飛べ! 砲弾娘マリモの冒険)	Shunji Yoshida	Nobuaki Kishima	Moriyasu Taniguchi	June 12, 1996	April 8, 2003
18	18	"Run, Yahiko!"/ "Run Yahiko! Get the Reverse-Edged Sword Back"; Transliteration: "Hashire! Yahiko - Sakabatō o Torikaese!" (Japanese: 走れ!弥彦· 逆刃刀を取り返せ!)	Directed by : Akira Shimizu; Storyboarded by : Mamoru Hosoda	Nobuaki Kishima	Toshimitsu Kobayashi	June 19, 1996	April 9, 2003
19	19	"Raijuta's Ambition"/ "The Fantasy of the Forbidden Kingdom"; Transliteration: "Raijūta no Yabō - Kinjirareta Ōkoku no Gensō" (Japanese: 雷十太の野望· 禁じられた王国の幻想)	Directed by : Kenichiro Watanabe; Storyboarded by : Kazu Yokota	Michiru Shimada	Akira Matsushima	June 26, 1996	April 10, 2003
20	20	"Revival of the Shinko Style"/ "The Technique Which Heralds a Storm"; Transliteration: "Shinkoryū no Fukkatsu! Arashi o Yobu Kyūkyoku no Satsujinken" (Japanese: 真古流の復活! 嵐を呼ぶ究極の殺人剣)	Yoshihiro Takamoto	Michiru Shimada	Ikkō Kobayashi	July 10, 1996	April 11, 2003
21	21	"Dissolution of a Nightmare"/ "Destruction of a Nightmare"; Transliteration: "Akumu no Hōkai! Raijūta no Yabō - Kanketsuhen" (Japanese: 悪夢の崩壊! 雷十太の野望·完結編)	Directed by : Jun Fukuda; Storyboarded by : Akihiro Enomoto	Michiru Shimada	Akihiro Enomoto	July 17, 1996	April 14, 2003
22	22	"Danger on a Runaway Locomotive"/ "Surprise Incident on a Runaway Locomotive"; Transliteration: "Hatsunori! Bōsō Okajōki Bikkuri Daijiken" (Japanese: 初乗り! 暴走陸蒸気びっくり大事件)	Aoki Yasunao	Michiko Yokote	Yasuhiro Aoki	July 31, 1996	April 15, 2003
23	23	"Sanosuke's Betrayal"/ "The Fateful Reunion"; Transliteration: "Sanosuke no Uragiri!? Unmei no Saikai" (Japanese: 左之助の裏切り!? 運命の再会)	Shunji Yoshida	Yoshiyuki Suga	Moriyasu Taniguchi	August 14, 1996	April 16, 2003
24	24	"Midnight Battle"/ "Midnight Battle: Kenshin versus Sanosuke Revisited"; Transliteration: "Mayonaka no Tatakai! Sanosuke Tai Kenshin Futatabi" (Japanese: 真夜中の戦い! 左之助対剣心ふたたび)	Directed by : Akira Shimizu; Storyboarded by : Hiroyuki Kakudou	Yoshiyuki Suga	Toshimitsu Kobayashi	August 21, 1996	April 17, 2003
25	25	"The Crimson Pirate"/ "The Red Pirate – Kenshin and Kaoru Separated"; Transliteration: "Shinku no Kaizoku - Hikisakareta Kenshin to Kaoru" (Japanese: 真紅の海賊· 引き裂かれた剣心と薫!)	Directed by : Shigeo Koshi; Storyboarded by : Kazu Yokota	Michiru Shimada	Akira Matsushima	August 28, 1996	April 18, 2003
26	26	"Lightning Incarnate"/ "Shura, The Mysterious Female Pirate"; Transliteration: "Inazuma no Keshin! Hokoritakaki Nazo no Onna Kaizoku Shura" (Japanese: 稲妻の化身! 誇り高き謎の女海賊, 朱羅)	Kiyoshi Murayama	Michiru Shimada	Masahide Yanagisawa	September 4, 1996	April 21, 2003
27	27	"Burn, Island of Terror!"/ "The Red Pirate - Conclusion"; Transliteration: "Moeagaru Senritsu no Shima! Shinku no Kaizoku - Kanketsuhen" (Japanese: 燃え上がる戦慄の島! 真紅の海賊·完結編)	Directed by : Jun Fukuda; Storyboarded by : Akihiro Enomoto	Michiru Shimada	Akihiro Enomoto	October 16, 1996	April 22, 2003

=== Season 2 (1996–97) ===
No. overall	No. in season	Title	Directed by	Written by	Animation directed by	Original release date	American air date
28	1	"Prelude to the Impending Fight: The Shadow of the Wolf Draws Near"; Transliteration: "Aratanaru Kessen e no Jokyoku: Semarikuru Ōkami no Kage!" (Japanese: 新たなる血戦への序曲· 迫り来る狼の影!)	Yoshihiro Takamoto	Yoshiyuki Suga	Ikkō Kobayashi	October 30, 1996	April 24, 2003
29	2	"Strongest Opponent From the Past: Merciless Fangs Strike!"; Transliteration: "Shijō Saikyō no Shukuteki! Osoikakaru Hijō no Kiba" (Japanese: 史上最強の宿敵! 襲いかかる非情の牙)	Directed by : Akira Shimizu; Storyboarded by : Mamoru Hosoda	Yoshiyuki Suga	Toshimitsu Kobayashi	November 6, 1996	April 25, 2003
30	3	"A Devil of Vengeance: Makoto Shishio's Plot"; Transliteration: "Fukushū no Akki: Shishio Makoto no Bōryaku" (Japanese: 復讐の悪鬼 志々雄真実(まこと)の謀略)	Kazuhiro Furuhashi	Michiru Shimada	Masahide Yanagisawa	November 13, 1996	April 28, 2003
31	4	"A Wish Unrequited: Kenshin Departs"; Transliteration: "Todokanu Omoi... Kenshin no Tabidachi" (Japanese: 届かぬ想い......剣心の旅立ち!)	Directed by : Kazuhiro Furuhashi; Storyboarded by : Norio Matsumoto	Michiru Shimada	Atsuko Nakajima	November 27, 1996	April 29, 2003
32	5	"Change Tears to Courage: Kaoru Kamiya's Choice"; Transliteration: "Namida o Yūki ni Kaete! Kamiya Kaoru ga Eranda Michi" (Japanese: 涙を勇気にかえて! 神谷薫が選んだ道)	Shunji Yoshida	Yoshiyuki Suga	Moriyasu Taniguchi	December 4, 1996	April 30, 2003
33	6	"For the Title of Strongest: Aoshi's New Conflict"; Transliteration: "Saikyō no Shōgō o Tsukamu made! Aoshi no Aratanaru Tatakai" (Japanese: 最強の称号を掴むまで! 蒼紫の新たなる闘い)	Directed by : Shigeru Ōmachi; Storyboarded by : Kazu Yokota	Michiru Shimada	Akira Matsushima	December 11, 1996	May 1, 2003
34	7	"The Girl Bandit: Misao Makimachi's Hidden Side"; Transliteration: "Oihagi Shōjo – Makimachi Misao no Kakusareta Shōtai!" (Japanese: 追いはぎ少女· 巻町 操の隠された正体!)	Yoshihiro Takamoto	Michiru Shimada	Ikkō Kobayashi	January 8, 1997	May 2, 2003
35	8	"Conquered Village: The Grasp of Shishio's Hands"; Transliteration: "Ubawareta Mura – Osoikakaru Shishio no Ma no Te!" (Japanese: 奪われた村· 襲いかかる志々雄の魔の手!)	Directed by : Akira Shimizu; Storyboarded by : Hiroyuki Kakudō	Yoshiyuki Suga	Toshimitsu Kobayashi	January 15, 1997	June 17, 2003
36	9	"Across the Boundary Between Edo and Meiji: Kenshin and Shishio Face to Face!"; Transliteration: "Bakumatsu no Toki o Koete! Taiji Shita Shishio to Kenshin" (Japanese: 幕末の時を超えて! 対峙した志々雄と剣心)	Directed by : Jun Fukuda; Storyboarded by : Akihiro Enomoto	Yoshiyuki Suga	Akihiro Enomoto	January 22, 1997	June 18, 2003
37	10	"Shock! The Reverse-Blade is Broken: Sojiro's Tenken verses Kenshin"; Transliteration: "Shōgeki! Oreta Sakabatō – Tenken no Sōjirō Tai Kenshin" (Japanese: 衝撃!折れた逆刃刀· 天剣の宗次郎対剣心)	Katsuyoshi Yatabe	Yoshiyuki Suga	Kazunori Takahashi	January 29, 1997	June 19, 2003
38	11	"Sanosuke's Secret Training: The Challenge of Anji the Destroyer"; Transliteration: "Sanosuke, Gokui no Shugyō! Hakaisō – Anji e no Chōsen" (Japanese: 左之助, 極意の修行! 破戒僧·安慈への挑戦)	Directed by : Shigeru Ōmachi; Storyboarded by : Kazu Yokota	Yoshiyuki Suga	Akira Matsushima	February 5, 1997	June 20, 2003
39	12	"The Creator of the Reverse-Blade Sword: Shakku Arai's Final Swing"; Transliteration: "Sakabatō o Tsukutta Otoko – Arai Shakkū Saigo no Hito Furi!" (Japanese: 逆刃刀を作った男· 新井赤空 最後の一振り!)	Yoshihiro Takamoto	Yoshiyuki Suga	Kuniyuki Ishii	February 12, 1997	June 23, 2003
40	13	"A Killer Without Mercy: Fight to the Death Against the Cho of the Juppongatana"; Transliteration: "Osorubeki Mujō no Shikaku! Juppongatana Chō to no Shitō" (Japanese: 恐るべき無情の刺客! 十本刀·張との死闘)	Directed by : Akira Shimizu; Storyboarded by : Hiroyuki Kakudou	Yoshiyuki Suga	Toshimitsu Kobayashi	February 19, 1997	June 24, 2003
41	14	"The Ultimate Technique of the Hiten-Mitsurugi Style: Reunion with a Mentor, Seijuro Hiko"; Transliteration: "Hiten Mitsurugiryū no Ōgi! Shishō Hiko Seijūrō to no Saikai" (Japanese: 飛天御剣流の奥義! 師匠比古清十郎との再会)	Directed by : Jun Fukuda; Storyboarded by : Akihiro Enomoto	Michiru Shimada	Akihiro Enomoto	February 26, 1997	June 25, 2003
42	15	"The Formation of an Alliance: The Day When Aoshi Joins with Shishio"; Transliteration: "Dōmei Seiritsu: Aoshi ga Shishio to Te o Kunda Hi!" (Japanese: 同盟成立· 蒼紫が志々雄と手を組んだ日!)	Katsuyoshi Yatabe	Michiru Shimada	Kazunori Takahashi	March 5, 1997	June 26, 2003
43	16	"Between Life and Death: Master the Ultimate Technique, Amakakeru Ryu no Hirameki!"; Transliteration: "Sei to Shi no Aida de! Ōgi Amakakeru Ryū no Hirameki no Etoku" (Japanese: 生と死の間で! 奥義·天飛龍閃(あまかけるりゅうのひらめき)の会得)	Directed by : Akira Shimizu; Storyboarded by : Hiroyuki Kakudou	Michiru Shimada	Toshimitsu Kobayashi	March 12, 1997	June 27, 2003
44	17	"A Decisive Battle Like Violent Waters: The Strongest Troop Juppongatana"; Transliteration: "Dotō no Kessen, Saikyō Shūdan Juppongatana Shūketsu!" (Japanese: 怒涛の決戦· 最強集団十本刀集結!)	Directed by : Shigeru Ōmachi; Storyboarded by : Kazu Yokota	Michiru Shimada	Akira Matsushima	March 19, 1997	June 30, 2003
45	18	"As if to Fly: Stop the Launch of the Battleship Purgatory!"; Transliteration: "Tobu ga Gotoku! Senkan Rengoku Shukkō o Soshi Seyo" (Japanese: 翔ぶが如く! 戦艦煉獄 出航を阻止せよ)	Ichirō Takakura	Yoshiyuki Suga	Kazuyuki Kobayashi	April 16, 1997	July 1, 2003
46	19	"Purgatory Bursts into Flames: The Destiny of Makoto Shishio"; Transliteration: "Rengoku Enjō! Shishio Makoto no Meiun" (Japanese: 煉獄炎上! 志々雄真実(まこと)の命運)	Directed by : Akira Kusune; Storyboarded by : Futa Morita & Kazu Yokota	Michiru Shimada	Kazunori Takahashi	April 23, 1997	July 2, 2003
47	20	"Crash! The Lethal Punch, Futae no Kiwami: The Fist of Sanosuke Screams!"; Transliteration: "Gekitotsu! Futae no Kiwami: Unaru Sanosuke no Kobushi" (Japanese: 激突!二重の極み· 唸る左之助の拳)	Directed by : Shigeru Ōmachi; Storyboarded by : Kazu Yokota	Michiru Shimada	Akira Matsushima	April 30, 1997	July 3, 2003
48	21	"Reborn to Salvation: The Beginning of Anji's New Life"; Transliteration: "Guze e no Saisei: Anji no Arata naru Shuppatsu" (Japanese: 救世(ぐぜ)への再生· 安慈の新たなる出発)	Directed by : Akira Shimizu; Storyboarded by : Hiroki Kudō	Michiru Shimada	Toshimitsu Kobayashi	May 14, 1997	July 4, 2003
49	22	"The Wolf Destroys the Eye of the Heart: The Fierce Attack of the Zero Stance Gatotsu"; Transliteration: "Shingan o Toraeta Ōkami: Sakuretsu Suru Gatotsu Zero Shiki!" (Japanese: 心眼をとらえた狼· 炸裂する牙突零(ゼロ)式!)	Ichirō Takakura	Michiru Shimada	Kazuyuki Kobayashi	May 28, 1997	July 12, 2003
50	23	"The Promised Time Has Come: Aoshi and Kenshin Fight Again"; Transliteration: "Yakusoku o Hatasu Toki: Aoshi to Kenshin no Saisen!" (Japanese: 約束を果たす時· 蒼紫と剣心の再戦!)	Koichi Chigira	Yoshiyuki Suga	Michinori Chiba	June 4, 1997	July 19, 2003
51	24	"Wake Up Now! Ignore Your Wounds and Fight to the Finish"; Transliteration: "Mezameru Toki wa Ima: Manshin Sōi no Ketchaku!" (Japanese: 目醒める時は今· 満身創痍の決着!)	Directed by : Akira Shimizu; Storyboarded by : Hiroki Kudō	Yoshiyuki Suga	Toshimitsu Kobayashi	June 11, 1997	July 26, 2003
52	25	"To Make a Miracle: The Battle at the Aoiya"; Transliteration: "Kiseki o Yobiokose! Aoi-ya no Kōbō" (Japanese: 奇跡を呼び起こせ! 葵屋の攻防)	Directed by : Shigeru Ōmachi; Storyboarded by : Kazuhiro Furuhashi	Michiru Shimada	Akira Matsushima	June 18, 1997	August 2, 2003
53	26	"The Giant Versus Superman: Like an Arrow Shot at a Time of Despair"; Transliteration: "Kyojin Tai Chōjin: Zetsubō no Fuchi ni Hanatareta Isshi!" (Japanese: 巨人対超人· 絶望の淵に放たれた一矢!)	Ichirō Takakura	Michiru Shimada	Kazuyuki Kobayashi	June 25, 1997	August 16, 2003
54	27	"Hiten versus Shukuchi"; Transliteration: "Hiten Tai Shukuchi! Sōjirō Tenpu no Chikara" (Japanese: 飛天対縮地! 宗次郎天賦の能力(ちから))	Koichi Chigira	Michiru Shimada	Michinori Chiba	July 2, 1997	August 23, 2003
55	28	"The Tragedy of a Stormy Night"; Transliteration: "Arashi no Yo no Sangeki: Sōjirō no Kako" (Japanese: 嵐の夜の惨劇· 宗次郎の過去)	Directed by : Akira Shimizu; Storyboarded by : Hiroki Kudō	Michiru Shimada	Toshimitsu Kobayashi	July 9, 1997	August 30, 2003
56	29	"A Duel With an Extreme Moment"; Transliteration: "Kyokugen no Shōbu! Shuntensatsu Tai Amakakeru Ryū no Hirameki" (Japanese: 極限の勝負! 瞬天殺対天翔龍閃)	Directed by : Shigeru Ōmachi; Storyboarded by : Kazuhiro Furuhashi	Michiru Shimada	Akira Matsushima	July 16, 1997	September 6, 2003
57	30	"Two Men at the End of an Era"; Transliteration: "Bakumatsu o Kaketa Futari: Shishio Tai Kenshin Saishūsen!" (Japanese: 幕末を駆けた二人· 志々雄対剣心 最終戦!)	Directed by : Shinichiro Aoki; Storyboarded by : Masayuki Ôzeki	Yoshiyuki Suga	Akio Kawamura	August 6, 1997	September 13, 2003
58	31	"The Age Chooses Shishio?"; Transliteration: "Jidai wa Shishio o Erabu no ka? Kenshin Saidai no Kiki!" (Japanese: 時代は志々雄を選ぶのか? 剣心最大の危機!)	Directed by : Akira Yoshimura; Storyboarded by : Hiroki Kudō	Yoshiyuki Suga	Takuro Shinbo	August 13, 1997	September 20, 2003
59	32	"Not Out of Luck!"; Transliteration: "Meiun Tsukizu! Tōshi, Ima Yomigaeru" (Japanese: 命運尽きず! 闘志, 今よみがえる)	Koichi Chigira	Yoshiyuki Suga	Kazuyuki Kobayashi	August 20, 1997	September 27, 2003
60	33	"The Man Who is Chosen for Victory"; Transliteration: "Shōri o Yurusareshi Mono: Shishio Tai Kenshin Shūmaku!" (Japanese: 勝利を許されし者· 志々雄対剣心終幕!)	Kazuhiro Furuhashi	Yoshiyuki Suga	Michinori Chiba	September 3, 1997	October 4, 2003
61	34	"The Juppongatana Who Remain (aka The Choice for Life)"; Transliteration: "Nokosareta Juppongatana: Ikite Yuku Tame no Sentaku" (Japanese: 残された十本刀· 生きてゆくための選択)	Directed by : Akira Shimizu; Storyboarded by : Hiroki Kudō	Yoshiyuki Suga	Toshimitsu Kobayashi	September 10, 1997	October 11, 2003
62	35	"Kyoto, the Engraved Memory"; Transliteration: "Kyōto... Kizamareta Kioku, Omoi o Haseta Shuppatsu" (Japanese: 京都...刻まれた記憶· 想いを馳せた出発)	Directed by : Shigeru Ōmachi; Storyboarded by : Toshirou Mitaka	Yoshiyuki Suga	Akira Matsushima	September 17, 1997	October 18, 2003

=== Season 3 (1997–98) ===
No. overall	No. in season	Title	Directed by	Written by	Animation directed by	Original release date
63	1	"The Legend of the Fireflies"; Transliteration: "Negaibotaru no Densetsu, Aru Kenkaku o Machi Tsuzuketa Shōjo" (Japanese: 願い蛍の伝説· ある剣客を待ち続けた少女)	Directed by : Kazuya Miyazaki; Storyboarded by : Katsumi Endō	Michiru Shimada	Masaki Hosoyama	October 14, 1997
64	2	"The Birth of Prince Yahiko"; Transliteration: "Yahiko Ōji Tanjō? Karei naru Shakōkai Debyū" (Japanese: 弥彦王子誕生? 華麗なる社交界でびゅー)	Directed by : Yasuhiro Geshi; Storyboarded by : Akihiro Enomoto	Yoshiyuki Suga	Takuro Shinbo	October 28, 1997
65	3	"Find the Lost Treasure!"; Transliteration: "Kieta Otakara o Sagase! Meitanteiken Notarō" (Japanese: 消えたお宝を探せ! 名探偵犬·ノ太郎)	Directed by : Akira Shimizu; Storyboarded by : Hiroyuki Kakudō	Yoshiyuki Suga	Toshimitsu Kobayashi	November 4, 1997
66	4	"Kaoru, Ecstatic"; Transliteration: "Kaoru Kangeki Kenshin no Puropōzu!?" (Japanese: 薫 感激 剣心のぷろぽ〜ず!?)	Directed by : Kazuhiro Furuhashi; Storyboarded by : Kazuhiro Furuhashi & Kiyoshi Hase	Yoshiyuki Suga	Ikkō Kobayashi	November 11, 1997
67	5	"The Gleaming Blade of Legends"; Transliteration: "Kirameku Densetsu no Ken! Shinpi no Kenshi Amakusa Shōgo" (Japanese: 煌めく伝説の剣! 神秘の剣士·天草翔伍)	Directed by : Makoto Sokuza; Storyboarded by : Junji Nishimura	Michiru Shimada	Tetsuhito Saito	November 18, 1997
68	6	"The Medallion of Destiny"; Transliteration: "Unmei no Medario, Sanosuke to Sayo no Deai" (Japanese: 運命のメダリオ· 左之助と小夜の出会い)	Directed by : Naoki Hishikawa; Storyboarded by : Sumio Watanabe	Michiru Shimada	Kazumi Sato	November 25, 1997
69	7	"To the Battlefield of Shimabara"; Transliteration: "Taisen no Chi, Shimabara e! Shiyū o Kessuru Toki" (Japanese: 対戦の地, 島原へ! 雌雄を決する時)	Directed by : Shigeru Ueda; Storyboarded by : Zouji Azumaya	Michiru Shimada	Seiichi Nakatani	December 2, 1997
70	8	"Shock of the Rai Ryu Sen"; Transliteration: "Rairyūsen no Shōgeki! Yami ni Hōmurareta Kenshin" (Japanese: 雷龍閃の衝撃! 闇に葬られた剣心)	Directed by : Hiroshi Morioka; Storyboarded by : Katsumi Terahigashi	Michiru Shimada	Yumenosuke Tokuda	December 9, 1997
71	9	"The Conspiracy of Kaiou: Shougo Caught in a Trap"; Transliteration: "Kaiō no Inbō, Wana ni Kakatta Shōgo!" (Japanese: 傀王の陰謀 罠にかかった翔伍!)	Directed by : Hiroyuki Yokoyama; Storyboarded by : Junji Nishimura	Michiru Shimada	Tetsuhito Saito	December 16, 1997
72	10	"The Days of Remorse"; Transliteration: "Tsuioku no Hibi, Shōgo to Sayo no Kanashiki Kako" (Japanese: 追憶の日々· 翔伍と小夜の哀しき過去)	Directed by : Akira Shimizu; Storyboarded by : Hiroyuki Kakudō	Michiru Shimada	Toshimitsu Kobayashi	January 6, 1998
73	11	"The Sneering Demon"; Transliteration: "Azawarau Akki! Shōzō, Bakuen ni Chitta Karyū" (Japanese: あざ笑う悪鬼! 庄三, 爆炎に散った火龍)	Directed by : Makoto Sokuza; Storyboarded by : Tsukasa Sunaga	Michiru Shimada	Masaaki Kannan	January 13, 1998
74	12	"Sanosuke's Tears"; Transliteration: "Sanosuke no Namida, Futari ni Otozureta Towa no Wakare" (Japanese: 左之助の涙 二人に訪れた永遠(とわ)の別離(わかれ))	Directed by : Naoki Hishikawa; Storyboarded by : Sumio Watanabe	Michiru Shimada	Seiichi Nakatani	January 20, 1998
75	13	"The Last Crusade"; Transliteration: "Saigo no Seisen, Gekitotsu! Futatsu no Amakakeru Ryū no Hirameki" (Japanese: 最後の聖戦 激突!ふたつの天翔龍閃(あまかけるりゅうのひらめき))	Directed by : Hiroshi Morioka; Storyboarded by : Katsumi Terahigashi	Michiru Shimada	Kazumi Sato	January 27, 1998
76	14	"Bon Voyage"; Transliteration: "Tabidachi no Umi, Kibō wa Kanashimi no Nami o Koete" (Japanese: 旅立ちの海 希望は哀しみの波を越えて)	Directed by : Akira Shimizu; Storyboarded by : Kodo Koji	Michiru Shimada	Toshimitsu Kobayashi	February 3, 1998
77	15	"Himura Dojo in Shimonoseki?"; Transliteration: "Shimonoseki ni Himura Dōjō? Mō Hitori no Battōsai Arawaru" (Japanese: 下関に緋村道場? もう一人の抜刀斎現る)	Directed by : Hiroyuki Yokoyama; Storyboarded by : Tsukasa Sunaga	Yoshiyuki Suga	Akira Matsushima	February 10, 1998
78	16	"Crush!"; Transliteration: "Gagakusei no Omou Hito, Hakone Yu no Machi Koi Sōdō" (Japanese: 画学生の想う女性(ひと)· 箱根湯の街恋騒動!)	Directed by : Makoto Noriza; Storyboarded by : Kazuhiro Furuhashi	Yoshiyuki Suga	Tetsuhito Saito	February 17, 1998
79	17	"Kaishu-Katsu and Kenshin"; Transliteration: "Katsu Kaishū to Kenshin, Bakumatsu o Ikita Futari no Shukuen" (Japanese: 勝海舟と剣心· 幕末を生きた二人の宿縁)	Directed by : Naoki Hishikawa; Storyboarded by : Tsukasa Sunaga	Akemi Mende	Masaaki Kannan	February 24, 1998
80	18	"The Unending Revolution"; Transliteration: "Owaranai Bakumatsu, Kaishū ni Kaserareta Tenmei" (Japanese: 終わらない幕末· 海舟に課せられた天命)	Directed by : Hiroyuki Yokoyama; Storyboarded by : Tsukasa Sunaga	Akemi Mende	Kazumi Sato	March 3, 1998
81	19	"Conspiracy of the Beniaoi"; Transliteration: "Beniaoi no Sakubō, Kaishū o Nerau Bakumatsu no Ikiryō!" (Japanese: 紅葵の策謀· 海舟を狙う幕末の生霊!)	Directed by : Akira Shimizu; Storyboarded by : Sumio Watanabe	Akemi Mende	Toshimitsu Kobayashi	March 10, 1998
82	20	"Kaishu-Katsu's Determination"; Transliteration: "Katsu Kaishū no Ketsui, Jidai o Koeta Shinjitsu" (Japanese: 勝海舟の決意· 時代を超えた真実)	Directed by : Makoto Noriza; Storyboarded by : Katsumi Terahigashi	Akemi Mende	Seiichi Nakatani	April 14, 1998
83	21	"Yutaro Returns"; Transliteration: "Yutarō Kikoku, Kage ni Hisomu Kurokishidan no Yabō" (Japanese: 由太郎帰国· 影に潜む黒騎士団の野望)	Directed by : Shunji Yoshida; Storyboarded by : Moritake	Yoshiyuki Suga	Akira Matsushima	April 21, 1998
84	22	"The Sanada Ninja Squad"; Transliteration: "Sanada Ninjagun to Reiyaku, Okashira Misanagi no Nerai" (Japanese: 真田忍者群と霊薬· お頭御沙薙の狙い)	Directed by : Naoki Hishikawa; Storyboarded by : Tsukasa Sunaga	Yoshiyuki Suga	Masaaki Kannan	May 5, 1998
85	23	"A Straying Journey"; Transliteration: "Meisō no Tabi, Shikumareta Omiwatari no Wana!" (Japanese: 迷走の旅· 仕組まれた御神渡りの罠!)	Directed by : Hiroyuki Yokoyama; Storyboarded by : Kazuhiro Furuhashi & Norio Matsumoto	Yoshiyuki Suga	Tetsuhito Saito	May 19, 1998
86	24	"A Heatwave from Beneath the Earth"; Transliteration: "Chitei o Mau Akai Kagerō! Sakki! Sanada Sanninshū" (Japanese: 地底を舞う赤い陽炎· 殺鬼!真田三人衆)	Directed by : Akira Shimizu; Storyboarded by : Moritake	Yoshiyuki Suga	Toshimitsu Kobayashi	May 26, 1998
87	25	"Schneider's Bet"; Transliteration: "Shunaidā no Kake, Kurokishidan no Hōkai!" (Japanese: シュナイダーの賭け· 黒騎士団の崩壊!)	Directed by : Makoto Noriza; Storyboarded by : Katsumi Terahigashi	Yoshiyuki Suga	Kazumi Sato	June 2, 1998
88	26	"The Two Guides"; Transliteration: "Futatsu no Michishirube, Yahiko to Yutarō Towa no Yakusoku" (Japanese: ふたつの道標(みちしるべ)· 弥彦と由太郎永遠(とわ)の約束)	Shunji Yoshida	Yoshiyuki Suga	Seiichi Nakatani	June 9, 1998
89	27	"To My Angel Misao"; Transliteration: "Mai Enjeru Misao e... Kyōto kara no Mukae" (Japanese: まいえんじぇる操へ... 京都からの迎え)	Directed by : Hiroyuki Yokoyama; Storyboarded by : Kazuhiro Furuhashi	Akemi Mende	Masaaki Kannan	June 16, 1998
90	28	"Feng Shui Surprise Attack!"; Transliteration: "Fūsui no Kishū! Harimegurasareta Gobōsei no Nazo" (Japanese: 風水の奇襲! 張り巡らされた五茫星の謎)	Directed by : Naoki Hishikawa; Storyboarded by : Junji Nishimura	Seiji Togawa	Akira Matsushima	June 23, 1998
91	29	"The Magic of Feng Shui"; Transliteration: "Ugomeku Fūsui no Maryoku, Nerawareta Kamiya Dōjō" (Japanese: うごめく風水の魔力· 狙われた神谷道場!)	Directed by : Akira Shimizu; Storyboarded by : Moritake	Seiji Togawa	Toshimitsu Kobayashi	July 21, 1998
92	30	"Tokyo Under Martial Law"; Transliteration: "Kaigenrei no Tōkyō-fu! Bakushin Suru Kyōki no Ryūmyaku" (Japanese: 戒厳令の東京府! ばく進する凶器の龍脈)	Directed by : Shunji Yoshida; Storyboarded by : Junji Nishimura	Seiji Togawa	Masaaki Kannan	August 4, 1998
93	31	"The Enemy Awaits in Senjogahara"; Transliteration: "Teki wa Senjōgahara ni Ari! Hisui no Monshō o Motomete" (Japanese: 敵は戦場ヶ原にあり! 翡翠(ひすい)の紋章を求めて)	Directed by : Makoto Noriza; Storyboarded by : Katsumi Terahigashi	Seiji Togawa	Akira Matsushima	August 18, 1998
94	32	"The Elegy of Wind and Water"; Transliteration: "Kaze to Mizu no Banka, Ima Koko ni Shiryoku Tsukusu!" (Japanese: 風と水の挽歌· 今ここに死力尽くす!)	Directed by : Akira Shimizu; Storyboarded by : Junji Nishimura	Seiji Togawa	Toshimitsu Kobayashi	September 8, 1998
95	33	"End of Wanderings"; Transliteration: "Rurō no Saihate, Hi to Ruri no Kizuna wa Shiosai no Uchi ni" (Japanese: 流浪の最果て·緋と瑠璃の絆は潮騒の中 (うち) に)	Directed by : Akira Shimizu; Storyboarded by : Kazuhiro Furuhashi	Kazuhiro Furuhashi	Tsunaki Aki	December 2, 1998 (home video only)

== OVAs ==
=== Trust & Betrayal (1999) ===
No.	Title	Directed by	Written by	Animation directed by	Original release date	American release date
1	"The Man of the Slashing Sword"; Transliteration: "Kiru Otoko" (Japanese: 斬る男)	Kazuhiro Furuhashi	Seiji Togawa	Akira Matsushima	February 20, 1999	October 10, 2000
2	"The Lost Cat"; Transliteration: "Mayoi Neko" (Japanese: 迷い猫)	Directed by : Akira Shimizu; Storyboarded by : Jun Matsumoto	Seiji Togawa	Toshimitsu Kobayashi	April 21, 1999	October 10, 2000
3	"The Previous Night at the Mountain Home"; Transliteration: "Yoi no Satoyama" (Japanese: 宵里山)	Kazuhiro Furuhashi	Seiji Togawa	Akira Matsushima	June 21, 1999	November 7, 2000
4	"The Cross-Shaped Wound"; Transliteration: "Jūji Kizu" (Japanese: 十字傷)	Kazuhiro Furuhashi	Seiji Togawa	Masahide Yanagisawa, Atsuko Nakajima & Akira Matsushima	September 22, 1999	November 7, 2000

=== Reflection (2001–02) ===
No.	Title	Directed by	Written by	Animation directed by	Original release date	American release date
1	"After So Many Years Have Lapsed"	Kazuhiro Furuhashi	Reiko Yoshida	Akira Matsushima	December 19, 2001	March 25, 2003
2	"After So Many Years Have Lapsed"	Kazuhiro Furuhashi	Reiko Yoshida	Akira Matsushima	March 20, 2002	March 25, 2003

=== New Kyoto Arc (2011–12) ===
No.	Title	Directed by	Written by	Animation directed by	Original release date	American release date
1	"Cage of Flames"; Transliteration: "Homura no Ori" (Japanese: 焔の獄)	Directed by : Hiro Kaburagi; Storyboarded by : Kazuhiro Furuhashi & Hiro Kaburagi	Mari Okada	Masaaki Kannan, Yūki Iwai & Tokuyuki Matsutake	December 17, 2011 (theatrical); March 21, 2012 (video)	March 5, 2013
2	"Warble of Light"; Transliteration: "Hikari no Saezuri" (Japanese: 光の囀)	Directed by : Hiro Kaburagi & Toshiyuki Kato; Storyboarded by : Kazuhiro Furuhashi	Mari Okada	Masaaki Kannan, Yūki Iwai, Toshimitsu Kobayashi & Tokuyuki Matsutake	June 23, 2012 (theatrical); August 22, 2012 (video)	March 5, 2013
