= Rurouni Kenshin (1996 TV series) =

Japanese anime series

- るろうに剣心 -明治剣客浪漫譚- Rurōni Kenshin -Meiji Kenkaku Roman Tan-
- Also known as: Samurai X
- Type: TV series
- Genre: Adventure; Martial arts; Romance
- Based on: Rurouni Kenshin
- Created by: Nobuhiro Watsuki
- Directed by: Kazuhiro Furuhashi
- Character designers: Hideki Hamasu (1–66); Fumie Muroi (67–95)
- Music by: Noriyuki Asakura
- No. of episodes: 95 (list of episodes)

Production
- Art directors: Nobuto Sakamoto (1–66); Masami Hagiwara (67–95)
- Cinematographers: Hiroaki Edamitsu (1–66); Masahide Okino (67–95)
- Color designers: Masato Yokoi (1–66); Shinji Matsumoto (67–95)
- Editors: Takeshi Seyama (1–66); Keiko Mizuta (13–94); Megumi Uchida (13–94)
- Studios: Studio Gallop (1–66); Studio Deen (67–95)
- Producers: Koji Kaneda; Mitsuhisa Hida; Akio Wakana (1–66); Hiroshi Hasegawa (67–95)
- Production companies: Fuji Television; SPE Visual Works (Note: Credited as SPE until episode 39)

Original release
- Network: FNS (Fuji TV)
- Release: January 10, 1996 – September 8, 1998 (Note: It aired for 94 episodes on television, and the final episode was released some time later on home video.)

Related
- Film and OVAs
- The Motion Picture (1997); Trust & Betrayal (1999); Reflection (2001–02); New Kyoto Arc (2011–12)

Rurouni Kenshin (Japanese: るろうに剣心 -明治剣客浪漫譚-, Hepburn: Rurōni Kenshin -Meiji Kenkaku Roman Tan- (Note: 'The Epic Tale of a Meiji Swordsman: The Wanderer, Kenshin'. Rurōni (るろうに) is a stylized spelling of rurōnin (流浪人), the word for 'wanderer'.)), sometimes called Samurai X, is a Japanese anime television series, based on Nobuhiro Watsuki's manga series Rurouni Kenshin. It was directed by Kazuhiro Furuhashi, produced by SPE Visual Works and Fuji Television, and animated by Studio Gallop (episodes 1–66) and Studio Deen (episodes 67–95). It was broadcast on Fuji TV from January 1996 to September 1998. Besides an animated feature film, three series of original video animations (OVAs) were also produced; the first adapts stories from the manga that were not featured in the television series; the second is both a retelling and a sequel to the television series; and the third was a reimagining of the second story arc of the series.

Sony Pictures Entertainment produced its own English dub of the series, releasing it as Samurai X in Southeast Asia. Media Blasters later licensed the series in North America and released it on home video from 2000 to 2002. The series aired in the United States on Cartoon Network's Toonami programming block in 2003, only broadcasting the first 62 episodes.

Rurouni Kenshin has ranked among the 100 most-watched series in Japan multiple times, and is considered to be one of the best anime series of all time.

A second anime television series adaptation by Liden Films premiered in 2023 on Fuji TV's Noitamina programming block.

== Plot ==
When arriving in Tokyo in the 11th year of Meiji era (1878), the former Ishin Shishi Himura Kenshin wanders around Japan until reaching Tokyo. There, he is attacked by a young woman named Kamiya Kaoru, who believes him to be the Hitokiri Battōsai but ends up forgetting about him upon the appearance of a man claiming to be the Hitokiri Battōsai–tarnishing the name of the swordsmanship school that she teaches. Kenshin decides to help her and defeats the fake Battōsai, revealing himself as the actual former manslayer who has become a pacifist.

Kaoru invites Kenshin to stay at her dojo, claiming she is not interested in his past. Although Kenshin accepts the invitation, his fame causes him to accidentally attract other warriors who wish him dead. However, Kenshin also meets new friends including the young Myōjin Yahiko who wishes to reach his strength but ends up becoming Kaoru's student, the fighter-for-hire Sagara Sanosuke from the Sekihō Army who realizes the current Kenshin is different from the Ishin Shishi he detested for killing his leader Sagara Sōzō, and the doctor Takani Megumi who wishes to atone for her sins as a drug dealer, inspired by Kenshin's devotion to his past.

== Production ==
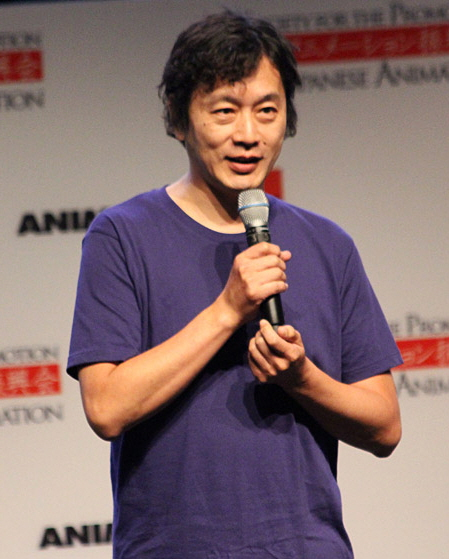
Kazuhiro Furuhashi at Anime Expo 2013

In a manga volume published prior to the anime's release, the original manga author Nobuhiro Watsuki stated that while some fans might object to an adaptation, he anticipated it, believing the manga was already "anime-esque". He expressed concerns about the sudden creation of the adaptation and its "tight" production schedule. In the same volume, he noted he had little involvement in the anime due to his busy schedule with the manga and a misalignment with the production staff's timeline. Watsuki believed it was impossible to make the anime and manga identical and was satisfied as long as the adaptation utilized the strengths of the anime medium.

After production began, Watsuki stated the final product was "better than imagined" and made with the "pride and soul of professionals". He criticized the pacing, certain subtitles, and the compression of story arcs, such as feeling the Jin-e storyline was insufficient for two episodes. Following a consultation with director Kazuhiro Furuhashi, he believed the anime would improve. Watsuki was disappointed that the voice actors from the CD dramas, particularly Megumi Ogata (Kenshin) and Tomokazu Seki (Sanosuke), were not cast in the anime. He reported receiving letters of protest and requests for Ogata to play Seta Sōjirō; Watsuki himself thought she would be suited for Misao. Watsuki expressed a hope that the original CD drama actors would find other roles in the anime. He attributed the recasting to the larger number of companies involved in the anime's production, which introduced industry power dynamics not present for the CD dramas.

The anime's second season included original stories not found in the manga. While Watsuki acknowledged some viewers disliked "TV originals", he found the concept "exciting". He noted that the first season had condensed the manga's initial story arc and looked forward to a "more entertaining" second season that would serve as a "much better stage" for the production staff's talents.

For the English dub, Media Blasters cast Richard Hayworth as Kenshin, giving the character a more masculine voice; Mona Marshall, a finalist for the main role, voiced the younger Kenshin in flashbacks. Script writer Clark Cheng stated that localizing Kenshin's distinctive speech patterns, particularly his use of de gozaru and oro, was challenging. These were replaced with phrases like "that I did" and the non-lexical interjection "huah" to convey the original intent without direct translation. Lex Lang was cast as Sanosuke. Cheng noted that Sanosuke appeared smarter in early episodes than intended, so his dialogue was gradually adjusted to align more closely with the Japanese version's portrayal.

== Release ==
Directed by Kazuhiro Furuhashi, Rurouni Kenshin was broadcast for 94 episodes on Fuji TV from January 10, 1996, to September 8, 1998. It was produced by SPE Visual Works and Fuji TV, and animated by Studio Gallop (episodes 1–66) and Studio Deen (episode 67 onwards). The anime only adapts the manga up until its Kyoto story arc, from then on it features original material not included in the manga. The unaired final episode was released on VHS on December 2, 1998. The episodes were collected on 26 VHS sets, released from September 21, 1997, to June 2, 1999; they were later collected on 26 DVD sets, released from June 19, 1999, to March 23, 2000. Three DVD box sets were released from September 5, 2001, to March 20, 2002.

Sony Pictures Entertainment produced its own English dub of the series, and released it under the name Samurai X in Southeast Asia. Sony attempted and failed to market Samurai X via an existing company in the United States. In October 1999, Media Blasters announced that it had licensed the series, later confirming that it would be released on home video. Media Blasters produced an English dub at Bang Zoom!, and 22 DVDs were released from July 25, 2000, to September 24, 2002. The series later aired in the United States on Cartoon Network, as a part of the Toonami programming block, starting on March 17, 2003, but ended with the 62nd episode, aired on October 18 of that same year. The series was heavily edited for content during its broadcast on Toonami. Media Blasters later split the series in three seasons and released each one as three premium DVD box sets from November 18, 2003, to July 27, 2004; they were re-released as "Economy" box sets from November 15, 2005, to February 15, 2006. The series, with both the original Japanese audio and the Media Blasters dub, was available on Netflix from 2016 to 2020.

== Soundtracks ==
Cover of the first soundtrack album

The music for the series was composed by Noriyuki Asakura. The first soundtrack album was released on April 1, 1996, containing 23 tracks. The second one, Rurouni Kenshin OST 2 – Departure was released on October 21, 1996, containing 15 tracks. The third one, Rurouni Kenshin OST 3 – Journey to Kyoto, was released on April 21, 1997, containing 13 tracks. The fourth one, Rurouni Kenshin OST 4 – Let it Burn was released on February 1, 1998, containing 12 tracks.

Several compilations of the songs were also released in collection CDs. 30 were selected and joined in a CD called Rurouni Kenshin – The Director's Collection, released on July 21, 1997. Rurouni Kenshin: Best Theme Collection, containing ten tracks, was released on March 21, 1998. All opening and ending themes were also collected in a CD, titled Rurouni Kenshin – Theme Song Collection, on December 6, 2000. Two Songs albums, containing tracks performed by the Japanese voice actors, were released on July 21, 1996, and July 18, 1998. All soundtrack albums, including OVAs and films, tracks were collected in Rurouni Kenshin Complete CD-Box, released on September 19, 2002. It contains the four TV OSTs, the two OVA OSTs, the movie OST, the two game OSTs, an opening and closing theme collection, and the two Character Songs albums. On July 27, 2011, Rurouni Kenshin Complete Collection, which includes all the opening and ending themes and the theme song of the animated film, was released.

== Related media ==
=== Anime film ===
An anime film, Rurouni Kenshin: The Motion Picture, premiered on December 20, 1997.

=== Original video animations ===
A four-episode original video animation (OVA), titled Rurouni Kenshin: Trust & Betrayal, which served as a prequel to the series, was released in 1999.

A two-episode OVA, titled Rurouni Kenshin: Reflection, which served as a sequel to the series, was released from 2001 to 2002.

A two-episode OVA, Rurouni Kenshin: New Kyoto Arc, which remade the series's Kyoto arc, was released from 2011 to 2012.

== Reception ==
On TV Asahi's top 100 most popular anime television series poll, Rurouni Kenshin ranked 66th. They also conducted an online web poll, in which the series ranked 62nd. Nearly a year later, TV Asahi once again conducted an online poll for the top one hundred anime, and Rurouni Kenshin anime advanced in rank and came in twenty-sixth place. It also ranked at tenth place in the Web's Most Wanted 2005, ranking in the animation category. The fourth DVD of the anime was also Anime Castle's best selling DVD in October 2001. Rurouni Kenshin was also a finalist in the American Anime Awards in the category "Long Series" but lost against Fullmetal Alchemist. In 2010, Mania.com's Briana Lawrence listed Rurouni Kenshin at number three of the website's "10 Anime Series That Need a Reboot".

The anime has also been commented by Chris Shepard from Anime News Network (ANN), noting a well-crafted plot and good action scenes. However, he also criticized that during the first episodes the fights never get quite interesting as it becomes a bit predictable that Kenshin is going to win as the music of moments of victory is repeated many times. Lynzee Loveridge from ANN highlighted as the most known series to use the Meiji period and saw the Kyoto arc as one of the best ones.

However, Mark A. Grey from the same site mentioned that all those negatives points disappear during the Kyoto arc due to amazing fights and a great soundtrack. Tasha Robinson from SciFi.com remarked "Kenshin's schizoid personal conflict between his ruthless-killer side and his country-bumpkin" side was a perfect way to develop good stories which was one of the factors that made the series popular. Anime News Network acclaimed both Shishio's characterization in regards to what he represents to Kenshin's past: "a merciless killer who believes his sword to be the only justice in the land." Similarly, Chris Beveridge Mania Entertainment praised the build up the anime's Kyoto arc has had as after fighting so much build up, Shishio fights and delivers skills that would amaze viewers despite suffering major wounds in the process. Beveridge reflected that while Shishio's death caused by his old wounds rather than an attack by Kenshin, the series's protagonist was also pushed down to his limits in the story arc due to fighting Sojiro and Shinomori before Shishio. Nevertheless, the writer concluded that it was still way paid off despite assumptions that Shishio's death might initially come across as a copout.

Although Carlos Ross from THEM Anime Reviews also liked the action scenes and storyline, he added that the number of childish and violent scenes make the show a bit unbalanced, saying it is not recommended for younger children. Daryl Surat of Otaku USA approved of the anime series, stating that while half of the first-season episodes consisted of filler, the situation "clicks" upon the introduction of Saitō Hajime and that he disagreed with people who disliked the television series compared to the OVAs. Surat said that while the Media Blasters anime dub is "well-cast," the English dub does not sound natural since the producers were too preoccupied with making the voice performances mimic the Japanese performances. Surat said that while he "didn't mind" the first filler arc with the Christianity sect, he could not stomach the final two filler arcs, and Japanese audiences disapproved of the final two filler arcs. Robin Brenner from Library Journal noted that despite its pacifist messages, Rurouni Kenshin was too violent, recommending it to older audiences.
