= Rurouni Kenshin: New Kyoto Arc =

Japanese original video animation series

- Key visual, featuring Himura Kenshin (left) and Shishio Makoto (right)
- るろうに剣心―明治剣客浪満譚― 新京都; Rurouni Kenshin - Meiji Kenkaku Romantan: Shin Kyōto-hen
- Type: OVA
- Based on: Rurouni Kenshin
- Created by: Nobuhiro Watsuki
- Directed by: Kazuhiro Furuhashi
- Series composition: Mari Okada
- Character designer: Hiromitsu Hagiwara
- Music by: Noriyuki Asakura
- No. of episodes: 2 (list of episodes)

Production
- Art director: Ken Naitō
- Cinematographer: Shinichi Igarashi
- Color designer: Shinji Matsumoto
- Editor: Masahiro Matsumura
- Studio: Studio Deen
- Producer: Ai Abe
- Production company: Aniplex
- Runtime: 45 minutes

Original release
- Release: December 17, 2011 – June 23, 2012

Rurouni Kenshin: New Kyoto Arc (Japanese: るろうに剣心―明治剣客浪満譚― 新京都編, Hepburn: Rurōni Kenshin -Meiji Kenkaku Roman Tan- Shin Kyōto-hen) is a Japanese original video animation (OVA) based on Nobuhiro Watsuki's manga series Rurouni Kenshin. It is a retelling of the manga's Kyoto arc. Produced by Aniplex and animated by Studio Deen, it was released in two parts, the first in December 2011 and the second in June 2012. The story focuses on the young Oniwabanshū member Makimachi Misao, who encounters the wanderer Himura Kenshin, who is on a quest to defeat the forces of his hitokiri successor Shishio Makoto.

== Plot ==
In the early summer of 1878, Ōkubo Toshimichi is assassinated, and the mastermind behind the plot—Shishio Makoto—devises a scheme to destroy Kyoto. To thwart his plans, Okina, the leader of the Kyoto Oniwabanshū entrusts Makimachi Misao, the orphaned daughter of his predecessor, with a critical mission: to locate Himura Kenshin, a former assassin once known as Hitokiri Battōsai, who played a shadowy role in the Meiji Restoration.

Misao travels along the Tōkaidō road, hoping to find Kenshin—who may also have information about her beloved Shinomori Aoshi. Unbeknownst to her, Kenshin is already en route to Kyoto to confront Shishio. Though initially bewildered by the stark contrast between Kenshin's fearsome reputation and his gentle demeanor, Misao accompanies him on their journey. Eventually, the two confront Shishio in the village of Shingetsu.

Shishio proclaims that the corrupt Meiji government must be overthrown and a new world forged through strength. Kenshin rejects his ideology, prompting Shishio to mockingly order his subordinate, Seta Sōjirō, to attack. In the ensuing battle, Kenshin's reverse-blade sword, the sakabatō—the symbol of his vow never to kill again—is shattered.

After acquiring a new sword, Kenshin—joined by Saitō Hajime and aided by allies—foils Shishio's scheme to ignite Kyoto. Determined to dismantle Shishio's grander ambitions, they pursue him to Osaka Port, where a decisive battle unfolds aboard his ironclad warship, the Rengoku. Within its hull, Kenshin and Shishio clash in a duel that transcends mere combat, embodying the ideological strife born from the chaos of the Bakumatsu. The confrontation reaches its climax when Shishio impales Kenshin with a lethal thrust, only for Kenshin to counter by smashing his sword's hilt into Shishio's forehead, splitting his skull. Shishio dies moments later as an explosion consumes the vessel.

In the aftermath, Kenshin crosses paths with Aoshi, defeating him in combat before convincing him to reunite with Misao. With Shishio's menace finally eradicated, Kenshin departs alongside Aoshi to rejoin Misao and the rest of his awaiting friends.

== Production and release ==
Rurouni Kenshin: New Kyoto Arc was produced to commemorate the 15th anniversary of the Rurouni Kenshin 1996 anime series, shifting focus to the character Makimachi Misao. Director Kazuhiro Furuhashi, Studio Deen, and most of the original voice cast reprised their roles after a nine-year hiatus. However, Hirotaka Suzuoki, the original voice actor for Saitō Hajime, died in 2006; Ken Narita assumed the role instead. Narita studied Suzuoki's portrayal to ensure his interpretation remained consistent with the character. Furuhashi, despite a busy schedule, chose to direct the films himself, feeling unable to entrust the project to another director. The animation was designed to appeal to both younger and older audiences. Furuhashi previously directed the 1996 anime series—his debut as a TV director—which aired on Fuji TV's prime-time slot, a significant responsibility. His work on the original series established his reputation, making his return for New Kyoto Arc a meaningful endeavor.

The project was first announced by the Jump Square magazine in April 2011. The project was split into two parts and is a remake of the second arc, the Kyoto arc, with some changes. The first part, subtitled Cage of Flames (焔の獄, Homura no Ori), was released on December 17, 2011. The title was selected from a fan suggestion. It ran at Tokyo's Cinema Sunshine Ikebukuro theater and Osaka's Cine-Libre Umeda theater for one week. The second part, subtitled Warble of Light (光の囀, Hikari no Saezuri), was released on June 23, 2012, and ran for three weeks in ten theaters. Aniplex released the first part on DVD and Blu-ray on March 21, 2012, while the second part was released on August 22, 2012.

At Otakon 2011, Aniplex of America announced that it was in negotiations for the English-language rights to the OVA in North America. Sentai Filmworks eventually licensed it and released both parts together as a DVD and Blu-ray set on March 5, 2013.

== Reception ==
Rurouni Kenshin: New Kyoto Arc received negative reviews. Travis Bruno of Capsule Computers noted that, as the OVA was told from Misao's perspective, many of Kenshin's allies received limited screen time; he nonetheless praised Meg Bauman's voice work as Misao. Bamboo Dong of Anime News Network criticized the OVA's retelling of the Kyoto arc for omitting the development Kenshin had received in the manga and anime. Dong also objected to the staff's portrayal of Shishio as sexually active despite his severely burned condition, and criticized the lack of well-executed fight scenes given the buildup surrounding Shishio's campaign to conquer Japan. Charles Solomon of IndieWire considered the New Kyoto Arc inferior to the original despite its faithfulness to the source material. Despite noting the OVA's weaknesses, Chris Beveridge of The Fandom Post found it enjoyable as a revisit of Kenshin's fight against the Ten Swords.

The Blu-ray and DVD releases of the second volume sold more than six thousand copies in their first week in Japan, ranking eighth and ninth, respectively.
