= Rurouni Kenshin: Reflection =

Japanese OVA series

- Key visual, featuring Himura Kenshin (front) and Kamiya Kaoru (back)
- るろうに剣心 -明治剣客浪漫譚- 星霜編; Rurōni Kenshin -Meiji Kenkaku Roman Tan- Seisōhen
- Also known as: Samurai X: Reflection
- Type: OVA
- Genre: Adventure; Martial arts; Romance
- Based on: Rurouni Kenshin
- Created by: Nobuhiro Watsuki
- Directed by: Kazuhiro Furuhashi
- Series composition: Reiko Yoshida
- Character designer: Akira Matsushima
- Music by: Taku Iwasaki
- No. of episodes: 2 (list of episodes)

Production
- Art director: Masami Hagiwara
- Cinematographer: Masahide Okino
- Color designer: Tomomi Murakami
- Editor: Takeshi Seyama
- Studio: Studio Deen
- Producers: Ena Kiriyama; Keiichi Matsuda
- Production companies: SME Visual Works
- Runtime: 45 minutes

Original release
- Release: December 19, 2001 – March 20, 2002

Rurouni Kenshin: Reflection, known in Japan as Rurōni Kenshin -Meiji Kenkaku Roman Tan- Seisōhen, (Note: Japanese: るろうに剣心 -明治剣客浪漫譚- 星霜編; 'Rurouni Kenshin: Meiji Swordsman Romantic Story – Time') is a Japanese original video animation (OVA) which serves as a sequel to the 1996–1998 anime television series Rurouni Kenshin, an adaptation of Nobuhiro Watsuki's 1994–1999 manga series. It was animated by Studio Deen, directed by Kazuhiro Furuhashi and written by Reiko Yoshida. It was released from December 2001 to March 2002.

The OVA series is set both during and after the timeline of the television series and tells of Kenshin and Kaoru's later days, much of which is not derived from the Rurouni Kenshin manga. It is mostly told from the point of view of Kamiya Kaoru. The story follows Himura Kenshin as he attempts searching for ways to atone for those who died at his hands, while Kaoru waits for Kenshin to return home. Kenshin's actions, however, alienate him from his estranged son, Kenji.

Rurouni Kenshin: Reflection was originally released in North America as Samurai X: Reflection while it was being licensed by ADV Films. Rurouni Kenshin: Reflection is currently licensed by Aniplex of America for English-language releases. Reflection was released in the United States by ADV Films on DVD in March 2003, while a Director's Cut edition was later released. Rurouni Kenshin: Reflection was released on Blu-ray Disc by Aniplex of America in September 2011.

Rurouni Kenshin: Reflection received mixed reviews upon its release; critics praised the art, animation and music of the series but criticized its story and character development.

== Plot ==
The narrative begins with a montage of pivotal moments from Himura Kenshin's life, recounted through the perspective of Kamiya Kaoru. The story then shifts focus to Kenshin, who is tormented by guilt over his violent past and his inability to reconcile it with his present happiness. Resolving to wander once more, he is met with Kaoru's unwavering support; she promises to await his return with their child, welcoming him home with a smile. Over the next fifteen years, Kenshin periodically revisits his family before being stricken by an unidentified illness. In an act of shared suffering, Kaoru persuades him to transmit the disease to her through intimacy. Kenshin later departs to aid in the First Sino-Japanese War, fulfilling a promise to the Meiji government—not as a combatant, but as a healer assisting the wounded.

Meanwhile, his son, Kenji, harbors deep resentment toward Kenshin for his prolonged absence. As a teenager, Kenji travels to Kyoto seeking tutelage under Hiko Seijūrō, aspiring to master the Hiten Mitsurugi-ryū style and rival his father's strength. Myōjin Yahiko, dispatched by Kaoru, confronts Kenji and engages him in a duel to dispel his misguided ambitions. Acknowledging Kenji's innate talent, Yahiko delivers a decisive strike with Kenshin's sakabatō, forcing him to confront the weight of his father's philosophy. Defeated, Kenji kneels as Yahiko presents him the reversed-blade sword as a belated genpuku gift.

Following the war, Sagara Sanosuke discovers an ailing Kenshin after he falls overboard during a voyage. Sanosuke arranges his return to Tokyo, where a bedridden Kaoru musters the strength to meet him along a path lined with cherry blossoms. Weak and faltering, Kenshin collapses into her embrace, whispering that he has come back for her. Kaoru addresses him by his childhood name, Shinta, fulfilling his final request. Beneath the blossoms, she assures him they will host yearly gatherings beneath the tree. As silence settles, Kaoru realizes Kenshin has died in her arms. Brushing his hair aside, she finds his scar vanished—a symbol of his atonement's completion.

In an epilogue, Kenji walks beneath the cherry blossoms with a young girl, Chizuru, vowing they will live happily together.

== Cast ==
Character	Japanese voice	English voice
Himura Kenshin	Mayo Suzukaze	J. Shannon Weaver
Kamiya Kaoru	Miki Fujitani	Katherine Catmull
Myōjin Yahiko	Miina Tominaga	Derek Wade
Sagara Sanosuke	Yuji Ueda	Gray Haddock
Takani Megumi	Mika Doi	Rebecca Robinson
Hiko Seijūrō	Shūichi Ikeda	James Brownlee
Himura Kenji	Yuki Kaida	Joey Hood
Sanjō Tsubame	Yuri Shiratori	Meg Bauman
Udō Jin-e	Akio Otsuka	Martin Blacker
Yukishiro Enishi	Nozomu Sasaki	Bill Wise
Yamagata Arimoto	Hari Kaneko	Bill Harwell
Chief Muraki	Sukekiyo Kameyama	Charles C. Campbell
Ujiki	Mitsuru Miyamoto	Charles C. Campbell
Raikōji Chizuru	Reiko Fujita	Elena Carrillo

== Release ==
Digipak art of the Blu-ray collection illustrated by Atsuko Nakajima

Rurouni Kenshin: Reflection was directed by Kazuhiro Furuhashi, with the screenplay written by Reiko Yoshida, and animated by Studio Deen. Its two episodes were first released on VHS and DVD by SPE Visual Works on December 19, 2001, and March 20, 2002. A "Director's Cut" DVD, which included new scenes, was released on October 9, 2002. Aniplex released the series on a Blu-ray set on September 21, 2011.

In North America, the OVA was released by A.D. Vision, under the title Samurai X: Reflection, on March 25, 2003. The Director's Cut DVD was released on December 28, 2004. Aniplex of America released the OVA on a Blu-ray set, as Rurouni Kenshin: Reflection, on September 20, 2011.

In Australia and New Zealand, Madman Entertainment released the OVA on DVD on May 14, 2003. In the United Kingdom, A.D. Vision released the OVA on DVD on September 22, 2003.

=== Music ===
The music for Reflection was composed by Taku Iwasaki. A soundtrack album, containing 18 tracks, was released on January 23, 2002.

== Reception ==
Although Reflection was not written by Watsuki, he stated that he "checked in on the script." Watsuki mentioned not having input in it, and let the director "run wild with it." In response to Kenshin's death in comparison to the happy ending in the manga version, he felt that his own work eventually would have reached Kenshin's death had he continued writing. He had not wished to pursue that line because "Kenshin went through so much crap and deserved a happy ending." He felt that neither version was better than the other because "it's a personal taste thing."

Mike Crandol of Anime News Network gave different opinions about the OVA series. On one hand, Crandal said that the OVA series were some of the best animation ever to come out of Japan, rivaling the American masters in fluidity of motion and with a musical score to match. On the other hand, Crandol says that fans of the original story will be disappointed as there are not many fight scenes and that the character Kenshin Himura is very different from his original version; for instance, he never uses his trademark idiomatic phrase "oro?", and it is thought he never gives a "true" smile. Crandol also comments about a "tedious and depressing melodrama". while IGN felt that some moments of the relationship between Kenshin and Kaoru were depressing. While criticizing the characters' sad decisions, Serdar Yegulalp from About.com wondered whether the OVAs had to make viewers accept Kenshin's death wish after so much time of wandering and feeling a mortal disease. However, some reviewers noted Kenshin's personality in the OVAs was one of the most complex ever to be animated remarking on the fact that he can not forget his bloody past, despite having a peaceful life. Don Houston from DVD Talk noted the controversy between the fandom as they refrained from treating Reflection as canon due to how tragic the life of Kenshin's family became. Ridwan Khan from Animefringe found that Enishi and Shishio's antagonisms against Kenshin in the original video animations were overshadowed by Kenshin's disease due to the bigger impact it has on the narrative.
