= Ken Narita =

Japanese actor, voice actor and narrator (born 1964)

- 成田 剣
- Born: Tsutomu Narita; May 18, 1964 (age 62); Saitama Prefecture, Japan
- Occupations: Actor; voice actor; narrator
- Years active: 1985–present

Ken Narita (成田 剣, Narita Ken; born May 18, 1964) is a Japanese actor, voice actor, and narrator. His real name is Tsutomu Narita (成田 勉, Narita Tsutomu). He is currently a freelancer.

He played Sesshomaru in Inuyasha, and after Hirotaka Suzuoki's death, he took over the roles of Bright Noa and Saitō Hajime.

== Filmography ==
=== Television animation ===
- The Brave of Gold Goldran (1995) (Dran, Goldran, Sky Goldran, Great Goldran)
- Eat-Man (1997) (Stow)
- All Purpose Cultural Cat Girl Nuku Nuku (1998) (Hell Mishima)
- Arc the Lad (1999) (Kelbe)
- I'm Gonna Be An Angel! (1999) (Kai)
- Inuyasha (2000) (Sesshomaru)
- Gensomaden Saiyuki (2000) (Koumyou Sanzo)
- Bobobo-bo Bo-bobo (2003) (Ochoboguchi-kun)
- Dokkoider (2003) (Pierre)
- Bleach (2005–2012, 2022) (Ryūken Ishida)
- Black Lagoon (2006) (Gruppenführer)
- Naruto (2006) (Nanafushi)
- Yu-Gi-Oh! GX (2006) (Giese Hunt)
- Shijō Saikyō no Deshi Kenichi (2006–2007) (Odin)
- Code Geass (2006–2008) (Jeremiah Gottwald)
- Amatsuki (2008) (Byakuroku)
- Gin Tama (2008) (Douman, Haga)
- Bakugan: Gundalian Invaders (2010) (Emperor Barodius)
- Naruto Shippuden (2010) (Hayama Shirakumo)
- Yu-Gi-Oh! Zexal (2011) (Jin)
- Btooom! (2012) (Masahito Date)
- Sword Art Online (2012) (Grimlock)
- Saint Seiya Omega (2013) (Dragon Shiryu)
- Akame ga Kill! (2014) (Dr. Stylish)
- High School DxD BorN (2015) (Shalba Beelzebub)
- Schwarzesmarken (2016) (Heinze Axmann)
- JoJo's Bizarre Adventure: Golden Wind (2018) (Illuso)
- Yashahime: Princess Half-Demon (2020) (Sesshomaru)
- Spriggan (2022) (Kōichi Moroha)
- Saiyuki Reload: Zeroin (2022) (Koumyou Sanzo)
- KanColle: Someday in that Sea (2022) (The admiral)
- The Too-Perfect Saint: Tossed Aside by My Fiancé and Sold to Another Kingdom (2025) (Leonard)

Unknown date

- Case Closed (Etoh, Muraki)
- E's Otherwise (Dr. Asakawa)
- Eden's Bowy (Wietoo)
- Elemental Gelade (Gladius)
- Fancy Lala (Komiyama)
- Fushigi Yūgi (Tetsuya Kajiwara)
- Gakuen Heaven (Jin Matsuoka)
- Ghost Hunt (Koujo Lin)
- Goshūshō-sama Ninomiya-kun (Mikihiro Tsukimura)
- Gundam Build Fighters (Kato)
- Hitohira (Takashi Katsuragi)
- Inukami! (Shinigami: Sea of Violence(Bouryoku no Umi))
- Inazuma Eleven (Ryuichi Kenzaki)
- Kyōshirō to Towa no Sora (Kazuya Ayanokōji)
- Le Chevalier D'Eon (Durand)
- Loveless (Seimei Aoyagi)
- Magical Girl Lyrical Nanoha Strikers (Jail Scaglietti)
- Nurarihyon no Mago (Storyteller)
- One Piece (Suleiman)
- Onegai My Melody (Man's Brothers, ep. 37)
- Reborn! (Adult Reborn)
- Scrapped Princess (Lenard)
- Seikon no Qwaser (Friederich Tanner)
- Rockman EXE Stream (Noboru Sunayama)
- Rurouni Kenshin: Shin Kyoto-Hen (Saitō Hajime)
- Skip Beat (Ren Tsuruga) (drama CD only)
- Sonic X (Black Narcissus)
- Star Twinkle PreCure (Fuyuki Kaguya)
- Toward the Terra (Glaive Murdock)
- Transformers (Construction Robot)
- Unbreakable Machine-Doll (Bronson)
- Uragiri wa Boku no Namae o Shitteiru (Isuzu Fujiwara)
- Vampire Princess Miyu (Barrow, ep. 13–14)
- Wandaba Style (Ichirin)
- The Wallflower (Host Club Owner, ep. 3)

=== Original video animation ===
- Araiso Private High School Student Council Executive Committee (????) (Matsumoto Takahisa)
- All Purpose Cultural Cat Girl Nuku Nuku DASH! (????) (Juuza Mishima)
- Angelique (????) (Arios)
- Fushigi Yūgi (????) (Tetsuya Kajiwara, Suzaku Seikun)
- Fushigi Yūgi Eikoden (????) (Tetsuya Kajiwara, fake Suzaku)
- Yamato 2520 (1995) (Thompson)
- Mobile Suit Gundam Unicorn (2011) (Bright Noa)
- Rurouni Kenshin: Shin Kyoto-Hen (2012) (Saitō Hajime)
- Mobile Suit Gundam: The Origin (2018) (Bright Noa)

=== Theatrical animation ===
- X/1999 (1996) (Fūma Monou)
- 6 Angels (2002) (Mike)
- Inuyasha the Movie: Affections Touching Across Time (2001) (Sesshomaru)
- Inuyasha the Movie: Swords of an Honorable Ruler (2003) (Sesshomaru)
- Inuyasha the Movie: Fire on the Mystic Island (2004) (Sesshomaru)
- Naruto the movie: Blood Prison (2011) (Hayama Shirakumo)
- Mobile Suit Gundam: Cucuruz Doan's Island (2022) (Bright Noa)
- Nintama Rantarō: Invincible Master of the Dokutake Ninja (2024) (Monjiro Shioe)
- Mobile Suit Gundam: Hathaway – The Sorcery of Nymph Circe (2026) (Bright Noa)

=== Video games ===
- Inuyasha (Sesshōmaru) (2001)
- Natsuki Crisis Battle (xxxx) (Tsuguo Nabeshima)
- Angelique series (xxxx) (Arios)
- Bleach: Heat the Soul 6 and 7 (xxxx) (Ryūken Ishida)
- Elemental Gelade series (xxxx) (Gladius)
- Fushigi Yūgi: Suzaku Ibun (xxxx) (Nakago)
- Phantom of Inferno (xxxx) (Scythe Master)
- Resonance of Fate (xxxx) (Vashyron)
- Super Robot Wars Alpha 3 (xxxx) (Calico Macready)
- Melty Blood Actress Again (2008) (Michael Roa Valdamjong)
- Zettai Meikyuu Grimm (xxxx) (Jacob Grimm)
- Zettai Zetsumei Toshi 3 (xxxx) (Keisuke Hikawa)
- Omerta ~Chinmoku no Okite~ (xxxx) (Liu Jien)
- Project X Zone (2012) (Vashyron)
- Project X Zone 2 (2015) (Vashyron)
- Tokyo Afterschool Summoners (2016) (Chernobog, Ded, Hogen)
- Genshin Impact (2020) (Capitano)
- Live a Hero (2020) (Sadayoshi)

=== Drama CDs ===
- Abunai series 4: Abunai Campus Love (Molester)
- Aigan Shounen (Godo)
- Angel Sanctuary (Archangel Raphael)
- Barajou No Kiss (Schwartz Yamamoto)
- Baito wa Maid!? (Takeaki Esaka)
- Baito wa Maid!? 2 - Shuubun!? Senden!? (Takeaki Esaka)
- Blue na Koneko (Hiroki Kuzumi)
- Brother (Pervert - Guest in volume 1)
- Danshiryou de Romance wo (Harumi Izumozaki)
- Endless series 3: Endless Love (Yoshimune Takara)
- Final Fantasy: Unlimited (Soljashy)
- Finder Series (Yan Tsu)
- Gisou Renai no Susume (Shuyo Akitsu)
- Hameteyaru! (Eiji Tatsumi)
- Heroic Spirit Lore Strange Tales ～ King of the Cavern Edmond Dantès ～ (Michael Roa Valdamjong)
- Katsuai series 1 (Touru Kurosaki)
- Katsuai series 2: Bakuren (Touru Kurosaki)
- Kedamono Series (Rei)
- Kodomo no Hitomi (Hitoshi Kashiwabara)
- Koi ni Inochi wo Kakeru no sa (Togashi)
- Koi no series 1: Koi no Tasting (Keisuke Nakamura)
- Koi no series 2: Koi no Seasoning (Keisuke Nakamura)
- Kubisuji ni Kiss ~Hong Kong Yakyoku~ (Suchue)
- Loveless (Seimei Aoyagi)
- Love Seeker (Kyousuke Suga)
- Milk Crown no Tameiki (Shinobu Takatou)
- Muteki na Bokura Series 1 (Satoshi Tsuyuki)
- Muteki na Bokura Series 2: Oogami Datte Kowakunai (Satoshi Tsuyuki)
- Muteki na Bokura Series 3: Shoubu wa Korekara! (Satoshi Tsuyuki)
- Muteki na Bokura Series 4: Saikyou na Yatsura (Satoshi Tsuyuki)
- Muteki na Bokura Series side story 1: Aitsu ni Muchuu (Satoshi Tsuyuki)
- Pink na Koneko (Hiroki Kuzumi)
- Omerta ~Chinmoku no Okite~ (Liu Jien)
- Ore no Mono! (Shou Hatori)
- Oresama Teacher (Takaomi Saeki)
- Saredo Futeki na Yatsura (Renji Ootsuki)
- Seikimatsu Tantei Club (John Garidebu)
- Shoukugyo, Ouji (Saido)
- Shounen Yonkei
- Skip Beat! (Ren Tsuruga)
- Slaver Series (Shigeru Yamawaki)
- Suit and Ribbon Tie (Hiroshi Tanabe)
- The Tyrant Falls in Love (Kunihiro Morinaga)
- Tsuki to Sabaku no Neru Yoru (Yazid)
- Wagamama Daiou ni Ki wo Tsukero (Yoshifumi Ikoma)
- Yume Miru Seiza (Yaginuma)

=== Dubbing roles ===
==== Live-action ====
- 12 Years a Slave (Samuel Bass (Brad Pitt))
- 28 Days (Jasper (Dominic West))
- 300: Rise of an Empire (Aeschylus (Hans Matheson)
- Ace Ventura: Pet Detective (Dan Marino)
- Ace Ventura: When Nature Calls (Prince Ouda (Maynard Eziashi))
- American Reunion (Jim Levenstein (Jason Biggs))
- Apollo 13 (2003 Fuji TV edition) (John Aaron (Loren Dean))
- Criminal Minds (Charles)
- Dark Angel (Alec McDowell (Jensen Ackles))
- Deep Rising (2000 TV Asahi edition) (Mamooli (Cliff Curtis))
- Donnie Darko (Prof. Kenneth Monnitoff (Noah Wyle))
- Dragonheart (King Einon (David Thewlis))
- From the Earth to the Moon (Michael Collins (Cary Elwes))
- End of Days (Hospital Cop)
- ER (Dennis Gant (Omar Epps))
- Good Will Hunting (Clark (Scott William Winters))
- The Green Mile (William "Wild Bill" Wharton (Sam Rockwell))
- H (Jo Seung-woo)
- Hocus Pocus (Dave Dennison (Charles Rocket))
- Lara Croft: Tomb Raider (Bryce (Noah Taylor))
- Lara Croft: Tomb Raider – The Cradle of Life (Bryce (Noah Taylor))
- Mighty Morphin Power Rangers (Skull, Baboo)
- Mindhunters (Bobby Whitman (Eion Bailey))
- Mission: Impossible – Ghost Protocol (Trevor Hanaway (Josh Holloway))
- The Mortal Instruments: City of Bones (Valentine Morgenstern (Jonathan Rhys Meyers))
- Mortal Kombat (Liu Kang (Robin Shou))
- My Own Private Idaho (Mikey Waters (River Phoenix))
- Never Been Kissed (Sam Coulson (Michael Vartan))
- Open Water 2: Adrift (James (Richard Speight Jr.))
- Painted Faces (Teenage Yuen Biao)
- Parenthood (1994 TV Tokyo edition) (Tod Higgins (Keanu Reeves))
- Paul Blart: Mall Cop 2 (Vincent Sofel (Neal McDonough))
- Platoon (2003 TV Tokyo edition) (Francis (Corey Glover))
- Rome (Marcus Junius Brutus (Tobias Menzies))
- Romeo + Juliet (Mercutio (Harold Perrineau))
- The Rum Diary (Hal Sanderson (Aaron Eckhart))
- Seinfeld (Jerry Seinfeld)
- She-Wolf of London (Julian Matheson (Scott Fults))
- Speed 2: Cruise Control (2000 Fuji TV edition) (Merced (Brian McCardie))
- The 6th Day (Wiley (Rodney Rowland))
- Third Watch (Bobby Caffey (Bobby Cannavale))
- Three Kings (Sergeant First Troy Barlow (Mark Wahlberg))
- Titanic (Fabrizio De Rossi (Danny Nucci))
- Trainspotting (Thomas Mackenzie (Kevin McKidd))
- Tucker: The Man and His Dream (Preston Tucker Jr. (Christian Slater))
- Ultraman: The Ultimate Hero (Kyle Morrison, Primary Official (B))
- Vampire vs Vampire (Ah Fong)

==== Animation ====
- Johnny Bravo (Johnny Bravo)
- Penguins of Madagascar (Classified)
