= Kazuhiro Furuhashi =

Japanese anime director and supervisor (born 1960)

- 古橋 一浩
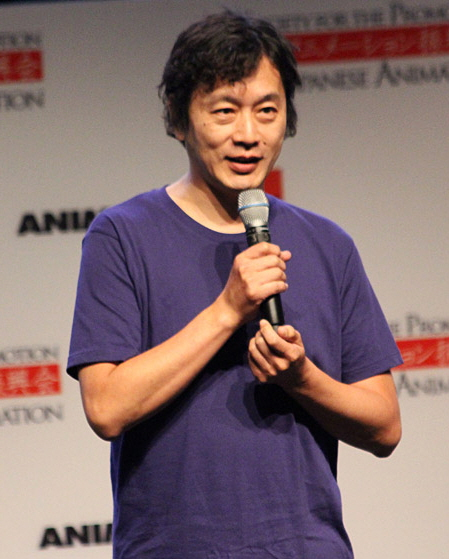
- Kazuhiro Furuhashi at Anime Expo 2013
- Born: June 9, 1960 (age 66); Hamamatsu, Japan
- Occupation: Anime director

Kazuhiro Furuhashi (Japanese: 古橋 一浩, Hepburn: Furuhashi Kazuhiro; born June 9, 1960) is a Japanese anime director and supervisor. He is amongst anime's most foremost directors, having directed the Rurouni Kenshin series (including the original television series, and its subsequent original video animation iterations), Zipang, GetBackers, Hunter × Hunter, Mobile Suit Gundam Unicorn, Dororo, and most recently, Spy × Family.

== Early career and biography ==
He began his career as an animator with the anime adaptation of Rumiko Takahashi's Urusei Yatsura and subsequently into episode direction and as a director with Studio Deen's anime adaptation of another Rumiko Takahashi work, Ranma ½. Furuhashi is particularly well known for realistic portrayals and first person views shown in his directorial and storyboard works and has obtained a good reputation as a director. Furuhashi has often collaborated and supervised numerous extensive and high-quality anime productions with animators Norio Matsumoto, Atsuko Nakajima and Hirofumi Suzuki. Over the years, he has worked in numerous productions with Studio Deen and began his directorial career with the studio.

== Works ==
=== Anime television ===
- Urusei Yatsura (1981–1986; animation director)
- Maison Ikkoku (1986–1988; key animation)
- F (1988; key animation)
- Ranma ½ (first series and nettō-hen) (1989; storyboards, episode direction)
- Super Zugan (1994; ending animation)
- Battle Fighters: Garō Densetsu (1992; storyboards, episode direction)
- Battle Fighters: Garō Densetsu 2 (1993; director, episode direction)
- Kuma no Pūtarō (1995–1996; storyboards)
- Rurouni Kenshin (1996–1998; director, storyboards, episode direction)
- You're Under Arrest (1996–1997; director)
- Hunter × Hunter (1999–2001; director)
- GetBackers (2002–2003; director, storyboards) - direction assistance by Keitarō Motonaga
- Gunslinger Girl (2004; storyboards of episode 12)
- Genshiken (2004; storyboards of episodes 2 and 4)
- Maria-sama ga Miteru (2004; storyboards)
- Maria-sama ga Miteru ~Haru~ (2004; storyboards, episode direction)
- Kyō Kara Maō! (2004; key animation of episode 2)
- Zipang (2004–2005; director, screenplay)
- Noein: Mō Hitori no Kimi e (2005–2006; storyboards of episode 12)
- Binchō-tan (2006; director, series composition, screenplay, storbyoards, episode director, direction and storyboards of OP and ED)
- Le Chevalier D'Eon (2006–2007; director, storyboards, episode direction)
- Mononoke (2007; storyboards)
- Darker than Black: Kuro no Keiyakusha (2007, storyboards of second opening theme)
- Higurashi no Naku Koro ni Kai (2007; storyboards of episode 13)
- Real Drive (2008; director, storyboards, episode direction, OP direction)
- Amatsuki (2008; director, series composition, screenplay, storyboards of episode 1, key animation of episode 13)
- Kimi ni Todoke (2009; storyboard of episode 6)
- Mobile Suit Gundam Unicorn RE:0096 (2016; director)
- Altair: A Record of Battles (2017; director)
- Neo Yokio (2017; director)
- Dororo (2019; director)
- Spy × Family (2022–2023; director)
- Dog Signal (2023; director)
- Agents of the Four Seasons (2026; animation adviser)
- Kaiju Girl Caramelise (2026; storyboard of episode 2)

=== Anime film ===
- Haikara-San: Here Comes Miss Modern Part 1 (2017; director, screenplay)
- Haikara-San: Here Comes Miss Modern Part 2 (2018; screenplay)

=== OVA ===
- Chōjin Locke: Lord Reon (1989; storyboards)
- Ranma ½: Nettō Utagassen (1990; director)
- Ranma ½: Kessen Tōgenkyō! Hanayome wo Torimodose!! (1992; director)
- Taiho Shichauzo (1994–1995; director, storyboards, episode direction)
- Rurouni Kenshin: Trust & Betrayal (1999; director)
- Reinō Tantei Miko (2000; director, storyboards)
- Rurouni Kenshin: Reflection (2001; director)
- Mobile Suit Gundam Unicorn (2010–2014; director)
- Rurouni Kenshin: New Kyoto Arc (2011–2012; director)

=== Games ===
- Tales of Rebirth (2004; director, storyboards and direction of game OP movie)
- Tales of the Abyss (2005; director and storyboards of game OP movie)
