= Dog Signal =

Japanese manga series

- First tankōbon volume cover
- Genre: Slice of life
- Manga
- Written by: Saya Miyauchi
- Published by: Kadokawa
- Imprint: Bridge Comics
- Magazine: Comic Bridge
- Original run: July 24, 2018 – present
- Volumes: 16
- Anime television series
- Directed by: Kazuhiro Furuhashi
- Written by: Satomi Ashino
- Music by: Michiru Ōshima
- Studio: Fugaku
- Licensed by: SA / SEA: Medialink
- Original network: NHK Educational TV
- Original run: October 22, 2023 – March 17, 2024
- Episodes: 20
- icon

Dog Signal (stylized in all caps) is a Japanese manga series written and illustrated by Saya Miyauchi. It has been serialised on Kadokawa's josei manga website Comic Bridge since July 2018, with its chapters collected into 16 tankōbon volumes as of October 2026. An anime television series adaptation produced by Fugaku aired from October 2023 to March 2024.

== Characters ==
Miyu Samura (佐村 未祐, Samura Miyu)
Voiced by: Kensho Ono
Shinichiro Niwa (丹羽 眞一郎, Niwa Shinichirō)
Voiced by: Kenichi Suzumura
Ritsuka Izumi (泉 律佳, Izumi Ritsuka)
Voiced by: Yūko Kaida
Suzunosuke Kubo (久宝 鈴之介, Kubō Suzunosuke)
Voiced by: Kenn
Sanju (サンジュ)
Voiced by: Anna Mugiho
Woolson (ウルソン, Uruson)
Voiced by: Kenichirou Matsuda
Yūko (優子)
Voiced by: Mariya Ise

== Media ==
=== Manga ===
Written and illustrated by Saya Miyauchi, Dog Signal began serialization on Kadokawa's josei manga website Comic Bridge on July 24, 2018. As of October 2026, 16 tankōbon volumes have been released.

==== Volumes ====
No.	Japanese release date	Japanese ISBN
1	January 8, 2019	978-4-04-065411-9
2	August 8, 2019	978-4-04-064012-9
3	February 7, 2020	978-4-04-064382-3
4	August 7, 2020	978-4-04-064845-3
5	March 8, 2021	978-4-04-680250-7
6	September 8, 2021	978-4-04-680784-7
7	March 8, 2022	978-4-04-681207-0
8	January 24, 2023	978-4-04-682052-5
9	February 8, 2023	978-4-04-682130-0
10	October 6, 2023	978-4-04-682645-9
11	March 8, 2024	978-4-04-683183-5
12	October 8, 2024	978-4-04-684242-8
13	March 7, 2025	978-4-04-684761-4
14	October 8, 2025	978-4-04-685357-8
15	March 6, 2026	978-4-04-660038-7
16	October 8, 2026	978-4-04-660673-0

=== Anime ===
An anime television series adaptation was announced on January 20, 2023. The series is produced by Fugaku and directed by Kazuhiro Furuhashi, with scripts written by Satomi Ashino, and music composed by Michiru Ōshima. It aired on NHK Educational TV from October 22, 2023, to March 17, 2024. The opening theme song is "Setsugetsu Fūka" (雪月風花; lit. 'Snow, Moon, Wind, Flowers') by Yu Takahashi, and the ending theme song is "Sugar Spot" (シュガースポット) by Nishina. Medialink licensed the series in South and Southeast Asia, and streamed it on YouTube via Ani-One Asia.

==== Episodes ====
No.	Title	Directed by	Storyboarded by	Chief animation director(s)	Original release date
1	"Homeless with You"; Transliteration: "Tomodaore na Bokura" (共倒れなボクら)	-	Kazuhiro Furuhashi	Izumi Yamanaka & Kyouko Kametani	October 22, 2023
2	"Your New Name"; Transliteration: "Atarashii Namae" (新しい名前)	-	Nagisa Miyazaki	SAI & Ye Zengyao	October 29, 2023
3	"Living in Bliss"; Transliteration: "Shiawase na Kurashi" (幸せな暮らし)	Hiroshi Kimura	Hitoyuki Matsui	Izumi Yamanaka	November 5, 2023
4	"Spinning Dog"; Transliteration: "Mawaru Inu" (回る犬)	Kana Kawana	Kana Kawana	Kyouko Kametani, Hiroko Shigekuni & Izumi Yamanaka	November 12, 2023
5	"Farewell Ceremony"; Transliteration: "Wakare no Gishiki" (別れの儀式)	Yuuki Nishiyama	Nagisa Miyazaki	Yuki Ikeda & Takuya Imakado	November 19, 2023
6	"Niwa's Teacher"; Transliteration: "Niwa no Shishou" (丹羽の師匠)	Hitoyuki Matsui	Hitoyuki Matsui	Li Shaolei & Liu Yunliu	November 26, 2023
7	"Things I Want to Protect"; Transliteration: "Mamoritai Mono" (守りたいもの)	Kazuya Fujishiro	Toshihiko Masuda	Kyouko Kametani & Izumi Yamanaka	December 3, 2023
8	"Exclusive"; Transliteration: "Hitorijime" (ひとりじめ)	Michita Shiraishi	Kana Kawana	Li Shaolei & Liu Yunliu	December 10, 2023
9	"Sanju, Sit!!"; Transliteration: "Sanju, Osuwari!!" (サンジュ、おすわり！)	Hiroshi Kimura	Susumu Nishizawa	Kyouko Kametani & Izumi Yamanaka	December 17, 2023
10	"Reasons Not to Eat"; Transliteration: "Tabenai Wake" (食べないワケ)	Kazuya Fujishiro	Nagisa Miyazaki	-	December 24, 2023
11	"No Disciplining?"; Transliteration: "Shitsuke wo Shinai?" (しつけをしない?)	Shinichi Fukumoto	Toshihiko Masuda	Kyouko Kametani & Izumi Yamanaka	January 7, 2024
12	"Miyu's Partner"; Transliteration: "Miyu no Partner" (未祐のパートナー)	Tsutomu Murakami	Masatoshi Hakata	-	January 14, 2024
13	"Confidence"; Transliteration: "Shinjiru Kokoro" (信じる心)	Kana Kawana	Kana Kawana	Kyouko Kametani & Izumi Yamanaka	January 28, 2024
14	"The Truth About Rocky"; Transliteration: "Rokki no Shinjitsu" (ロッキーの真実)	Hodaka Kuramoto	Nagisa Miyazaki	Huang Jiaxin & Hang Xinhua	February 4, 2024
15	"The Old Man and the Old Dog"; Transliteration: "Ojisan to Rōken" (おじさんと老犬)	Fukutarou Hattori	Akimi Fudesaka	-	February 11, 2024
16	"It's All My Fault"; Transliteration: "Watashi no Seida" (私のせいだ)	Yuuki Nishiyama	Hiromitsu Kanazawa	Takuya Imakado & Ye Chengyao	February 18, 2024
17	"Izumi Ritsuka's Sister"; Transliteration: "Izumi Ritsuka no Imōto" (泉津佳の妹)	Kazuya Fujishiro	Susumu Nishizawa	Kyouko Kametani & Izumi Yamanaka	February 25, 2024
18	"The Comic Artist and the Shiba Inu"; Transliteration: "Mangaka to Shiba Inu" (漫画家と柴犬)	Masayoshi Kawai	Tooru Yoshida	-	March 3, 2024
19	"The Smiles of Two"; Transliteration: "Futari no Hokorobi" (ふたりのほころび)	Fukutarou Hattori	Nagisa Miyazaki	-	March 10, 2024
20	"We Are Family"; Transliteration: "Bokura wa Kazoku" (ボクらは家族)	Masahito Otani	Takeshi Mori & Kazuhiro Furuhashi	Ye Changyao, Liu Yunliu & Hang Xinhua	March 17, 2024

== Reception ==
In 2021, the manga was nominated for the Next Manga Awards in the digital category.
