= Charles C. Campbell (voice actor) =

American voice actor

- Occupations: Voice actor; ADR director; recording engineer
- Spouse: Kerry Parish

Charles C. Campbell is an American voice actor, ADR director and recording engineer. He provides voices for a number of English-language dubs of Japanese anime films.

== Career ==
Campbell was employed as ADV Films' first in-house ADR audio engineer. He sat behind the mixing board through many ADV classics, including Neon Genesis Evangelion, Blue Seed, Battle Angel, Golden Boy and even the live action giant monster classic Gamera: Guardian of the Universe. He moved to Austin in 1998 to open ADV's Monster Island Studios. His directorial and writing debut was in 2000's Lost Universe. After directing the dub of Korean "live action" hit No Blood, No Tears in 2004, he was transferred back to ADV Studios in Houston. There he directed and produced the 105-episode Science Ninja Team Gatchaman dub.

In addition to writing and directing, Campbell has been a voice actor in many ADV titles. In recent years Charlie has been working at Funimation as a voice actor and occasional director in shows like One Piece, and Kenichi: The Mightiest Disciple. He also recently directed the Rurouni Kenshin: New Kyoto Arc and the Gatchaman OVA for Sentai Filmworks in 2013.

== Filmography ==
=== Anime dubbing ===
- 009-1 - Karl
- Aesthetica of a Rogue Hero - Volk Rem Aleclaster IV
- Air - Unsui
- Air Gear - Murata, Sunao
- Akame ga Kill! - Assistant Instructor (Ep. 3), Old Man (Ep. 9), Eyes (Ep. 11)
- Appleseed XIII - Lance
- Baka and Test - Summon the Beasts 2 - Obata (Ep. 2)
- Bamboo Blade - Morita, Toraji's Father
- Black Butler II - Arnold Trancy (Ep. 1), Earl Trancy (Ep. 8)
- Blood Reign: Curse of the Yoma - Marou (2nd Demon Form), Spider Demon
- Bodacious Space Pirates - Stone
- D. Gray-man - Mana Walker, Pedro, Charles (Ep. 1)
- Darker Than Black - Soichi Isozaki
- Deadman Wonderland - Akiyama, Ekishi (Ep. 12)
- The Devil Is a Part-Timer! - Watanabe
- Dimension W - Atsushi Kageyama (Ep. 4), Shijuro Sakaki (Ep. 3)
- Dragon Ball Z: Resurrection 'F' - Staff A
- Dragon Ball Z Kai - North Supreme Kai
- Dragon Ball Super - Pell, Vewon, Minotaurus
- Eureka Seven: AO - Alexander Boyle
- Fire Emblem - Barst, Gharnef
- Fairy Tail - Wakaba Mine, Wakaba (Edolas), Shop Owner (Ep. 1), Edolas Shop Owner (Ep. 80)
- Fullmetal Alchemist: Brotherhood - Giolio Comanche
- Ga-rei Zero - Yu Isayama
- Ghost Hunt - Kazuyasu Yoshimi
- Golden Boy - Narrator
- Guilty Crown - Shuichiro Keido
- Guyver: The Bioboosted Armor - Dr. Hamilcar Baracus, Additional Voices
- Hero Tales - Sōei
- ID: Invaded - Takuhiko Hayaseura/Uraido
- In Another World with My Smartphone -Laim
- Innocent Venus - Katsura
- Jing: King of Bandits: Seventh Heaven - Wayward Angel
- Kaze no Stigma - Hellhound, Sakamoto
- Kiba - Zico
- Last Exile: Fam, the Silver Wing - Gilbert (Ep. 20)
- Love After World Domination - Professor Big Gelato
- Michiko and Hatchin - Pogo (Ep. 8), Tito Ducha (Ep. 20)
- Moonlight Mile - Chris Jefferson, Lt. Mike Brian, Steve O'Brien
- My Hero Academia - Gran Torino
- My Ordinary Life - Vice Principal
- Ninja Resurrection - Senpachi Iso
- Oh! Edo Rocket - Santa
- One Piece (Funimation dub) - Carne, Zenny, Corgi, Banban, Fujitora, Additional Voices
- Panty & Stocking with Garterbelt - Police Chief (Ep. 1A), Additional Voices
- Princess Jellyfish - Kouichi Koibuchi
- Prison School - Chairman Kurihara
- Project Blue Earth SOS - Dr. Odenworld Jeeves, Alien Voice
- Psycho-Pass - Toyoshisa Senguji (Ep. 8-11)
- Pumpkin Scissors - Narrator, Smokey
- Red Garden - Robert Meyer
- RIN ~Daughters of Mnemosyne~ - Ivan
- Rurouni Kenshin: New Kyoto Arc - Kurojo
- Sakura Wars (OVA 2) - Shigeki Kanzaki
- Sakura Quest - Dokushima
- Samurai X: Reflection - Ujiki
- Scarlet Nexus - Joe Sumeragi
- Science Ninja Team Gatchaman - Leader X, Additional Voices (ADV dub)
- Sgt. Frog - Viper (2nd voice)
- Shakugan no Shana - Quetzalcoatl (Seasons 2-3), Centerhill, Gavida, Louie, Ose (Season 3)
- Shangri-La - Old Man Loli
- Shigurui: Death Frenzy - Henyasai Tanaba
- Shiki - Yoshikazu Tanaka
- Sonic the Hedgehog: The Movie - Old Man Owl
- Soul Eater - Lupin (Ep. 3)
- Space Dandy - Additional Voices
- Spice and Wolf - Jacob
- Tekken: The Motion Picture - Thug 1
- That Time I Got Reincarnated as a Slime - Hakuro
- Tokyo Majin - Munetaka Yagyu
- Toriko - Morton
- The Tower of Druaga - King Gilgamesh
- Unbreakable Machine-Doll - Edward Rutherford
- Utawarerumono - Genjimaru
- Wedding Peach - Akira Tamano
- Xenosaga: The Animation - Cpt. Moriyama
- Yuri on Ice - Toshiya Katsuki
- Zone of the Enders - Ron Pao, Temujin

=== Live Action ===
- Ultraman Z - Ultraman Ace (English Dub)
- Mega Monster Battle: Ultra Galaxy (English Dub)

=== Video games ===
- Borderlands 2 - Various
- DC Universe Online - Kilowog
- Smite - Ymir Is Here

== Production Staff ==
=== Dubbing Director ===
- 009-1
- Blade of the Phantom Master
- City Hunter: The Secret Service
- Comic Party Revolution
- Devil Lady
- Final Fantasy: Unlimited
- Gatchaman
- Getter Robo: Armageddon
- Guyver: The Bioboosted Armor
- Jing: King of Bandits
- Kenichi: The Mightiest Disciple
- Moeyo Ken
- Lost Universe
- Nadia: The Secret of Blue Water
- New Fist of the North Star
- One Piece (Funimation dub)
- Project Blue Earth SOS
- Pumpkin Scissors
- Rurouni Kenshin: New Kyoto Arc
- Sakura Diaries (2000 original version)
- Sakura Wars (OVAs)
- Samurai X
- Science Ninja Team Gatchaman
- Steam Detectives
- Zone of the Enders

=== Recording Engineer ===
- 801 T.T.S. Airbats
- The Adventures of Kotetsu
- Battle Angel
- Black Lion
- Blue Seed
- Burn-Up W
- City Hunter: .357 Magnum
- City Hunter: Bay City Wars
- City Hunter: Goodbye My Sweetheart
- City Hunter: Million Dollar Conspiracy
- City Hunter: The Secret Service
- Debutante Detective Corps
- Devil Hunter Yohko
- Devil Lady
- Dirty Pair Flash (OVA 1)
- Dragoon
- Ellcia
- Fire Emblem (anime)
- Getter Robo: Armageddon
- Golden Boy
- Iczelion
- Jing, King of Bandits
- Kimera
- Legend of Crystania
- Lost Universe
- Maps
- Mazinkaiser
- Moeyo Ken TV
- My Dear Marie
- Nadia: The Secret of Blue Water
- Neon Genesis Evangelion
- New Fist of the North Star
- Ninja Resurrection
- Plastic Little
- Queen Emeraldas
- Rail of the Star
- Samurai X (OVAs)
- Sakura Wars (OVAs)
- Shattered Angels
- Shuten-Doji: The Star-Hand Kid
- Sol Bianca
- Sonic the Hedgehog: The Movie
- Suikoden Demon Century
- Tekken: The Motion Picture
- Variable Geo
- The Wallflower
- Zone of the Enders

=== Script Adaptation ===
- City Hunter: The Secret Service
- Guyver: The Bio-boosted Armor
- Lost Universe
- Project Blue Earth SOS
- Science Ninja Team Gatchaman

=== Dubbing Producer ===
- City Hunter: The Secret Service
- Devil Lady
- Final Fantasy: Unlimited
- Getter Robo: Armageddon
- Jing, King of Bandits
- Lost Universe
- Mazinkaiser
- Moeyo Ken (OVAs)
- Nadia: The Secret of Blue Water
- New Fist of the Star
- Project Blue Earth SOS
- Sakura Wars (OVA 2)
- Samurai X (OVAs)
- Science Ninja Team Gatchaman
- Soul Hunter
- Steam Detectives
- Zone of the Enders
