= Saitō Hajime (Rurouni Kenshin) =

Fictional character from Rurouni Kenshin

- Rurouni Kenshin character
- Saitō Hajime on the cover of Rurouni Kenshin Kanzenban Volume 7
- First appearance: Rurouni Kenshin Act 48: Resurrection of the Wolf
- Created by: Nobuhiro Watsuki
- Portrayed by: Yōsuke Eguchi
- Voiced by: Japanese; Hirotaka Suzuoki (1996 series, The Motion Picture, Trust & Betrayal); Ken Narita (New Kyoto Arc); Satoshi Hino (2023 series); English; Daniel Woren (Samurai X anime version); Kirk Thornton (1996 series); Ken Webster (OVAs, The Motion Picture); John Swasey (New Kyoto Arc); Robert McCollum (live action films); Bill Butts (2023 series)

In-universe information
- Aliases: Mibu no Okami (壬生の狼, lit. "Wolf of Mibu"); Fujita Gorō (藤田 五郎) (new identity)
- Relatives: Tokio (wife); Mishima Eiji (adopted son)
- Affiliations: Shinsengumi (formerly); Meiji Government

Saitō Hajime (斎藤 一), known as Hajime Saito in the English-language anime dubs, is a fictional character from the Rurouni Kenshin manga and anime series created by Nobuhiro Watsuki. Being a fan of the Shinsengumi, Watsuki created Saitō as an anti-heroic and a foil to Himura Kenshin, the main character of the story, while basing him on the real life Shinsengumi member of the same name.

Set during a fictional version of Japan in the Meiji period, Saitō, known as the "Mibu no Okami" (壬生の狼, lit. "Wolf of Mibu"), is the former third squad captain of the Shinsengumi, a pro-shogunate force. During the Bakumatsu, he had a long time rivalry with Himura Kenshin, an assassin of the Imperialist cause. In the series, he is initially introduced as an antagonist who encounters and once again duels with Kenshin. It is later revealed that Saitō, who had only been testing Kenshin's strength, is now a spy agent working for the Meiji Government. After the reveal, Saitō becomes one of the main protagonists of the series, forming an uneasy alliance with Kenshin.

Saitō appears in the featured movies of the series, as well as the original video animation (OVA) series and other media relating to the franchise, including a wide range of electronic games. He has also been one of the most popular characters of the Rurouni Kenshin series, ranking near the top of the series' popularity polls. His character is featured in various types of merchandising developed for the series, such as figurines and key-chains. Several anime and manga publications have commented on Saitō's character.

== Creation and conception ==
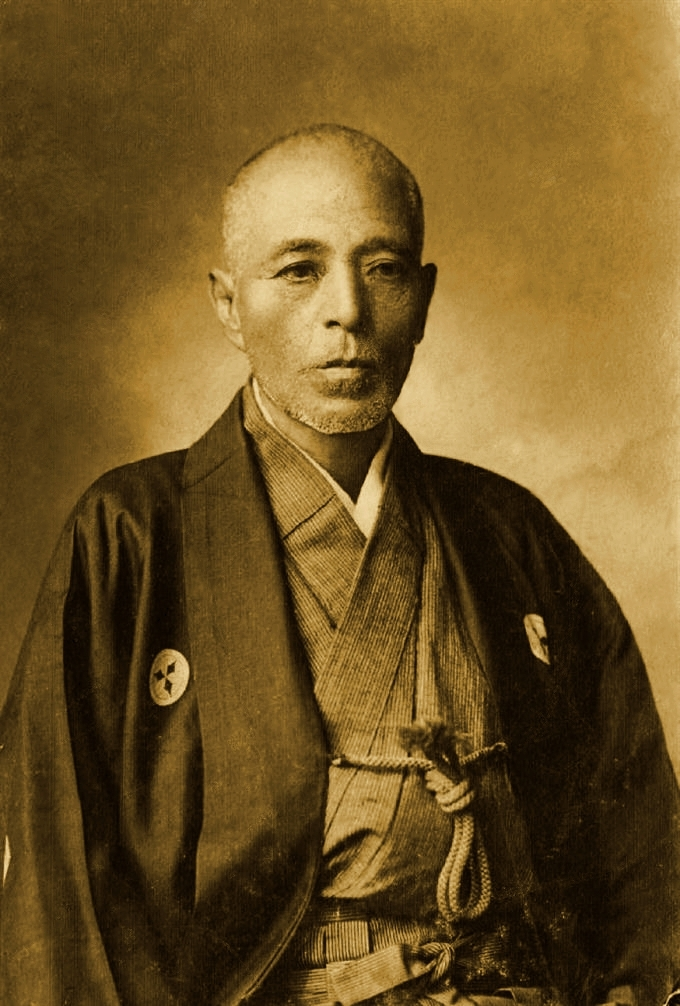
The manga character was based on the historical figure of the same name.

Nobuhiro Watsuki based Saitō Hajime on the actual historic figure of the same name who was the captain of the third squad of the Shinsengumi in the Meiji era. Watsuki altered the character to a higher degree than the other historic figures who appear in Rurouni Kenshin since the character Saitō has a greater role in the story than the other characters. In the development of Rurouni Kenshin Watsuki planned for Saitō to be a "dirty" hero who maintains his "Swift Death to Evil" policy and does not become friendly with Kenshin's group, being rather aloof to them. Hajime has no specific model for his design. Since Watsuki intended for the character Saitō to be a villain, he made the character's face "villain-ish."

Watsuki considers Saitō as the "curse" of the villains in the series since he defeats the enemies who consider themselves the strongest. Watsuki came up with the idea of the Gatotsu (牙突; "Fang's Tip") sword technique that Saitō uses in the series from the fact that the historical figure's favorite move was the "left single-handed thrust," or hirazuki (水平突き; lit. "Horizontal Thrust"), a technique mainly for slashing downward, stabbing, and thrusts. Watsuki gave Saitō's left-handed technique the name "Gatotsu" to fit with the action comic theme.

In July 2006, the Japanese publishers of Rurouni Kenshin released the kanzenban edition. In the sixth kanzenban volume, Watsuki included a draft page featuring a redesigned appearance of Saitō's character.

In the anime adaptation of Rurouni Kenshin, Watsuki's designs of Saitō were combined with the talents of voice actor Hirotaka Suzuoki, who also voiced Saitō in the original video animations and Rurouni Kenshin: The Motion Picture. However, due to Suzuoki's death in 2006, he was replaced by Ken Narita as the new voice actor for Saitō in the two-part Rurouni Kenshin: New Kyoto Arc movies.

== Appearances ==
=== In Rurouni Kenshin ===
Saitō Hajime, known as the "Mibu no Okami" (壬生の狼, lit. "Wolf of Mibu"), is the former captain of the third squad of the Shinsengumi, a loyalist force of the Tokugawa shogunate. A powerful and ruthless swordsman, Saitō lives by the code "Aku Soku Zan" (悪即斬, Swift Death to Evil), and frequently fights using the Gatotsu, a special left-handed stab variant of the Hirazuki technique of the Shinsengumi, and its different stances. During his time in the Shinsengumi, he was a close associate of fellow Shinsengumi member and first squad captain Okita Sōji, and also developed a rivalry with the pro-Imperialist Himura Kenshin. Kenshin said that he and Saito, and Okita, and Shinpachi, had fought with each other 3 times, but none had never finished At the end of the Bakumatsu, the pro-shogunate forces were ultimately defeated and Saitō was forced to go into hiding. He later changed his name to Fujita Gorō (藤田 五郎) and started working for the Meiji Government as a spy agent. Saitō is also married to a woman named Tokio (時尾), who does not appear in the story.

In his introduction to the series, Saitō attacks and injures Sagara Sanosuke. Saitō has been hired by Shibumi, a corrupt politician, to kill Kenshin; thus, his attack on Sanosuke serving as a warning to Kenshin. While Kenshin is dueling Shibumi's assassin Akamatsu Arundo, Saitō appears at the Kamiya dojo, using his alias "Fujita Gorō", and poses as a police officer who urgently needs to speak with Kenshin. When Kenshin returns, upon recognizing Saitō, he reveals Saitō's true identity as the former Shinsengumi third squad captain. They fight, and just as they are about to kill each other, Ōkubo Toshimichi appears and stops the duel, revealing that Saitō was only testing Kenshin's abilities to see if he was skilled enough to face Shishio Makoto. Having revealed his true allegiance with Ōkubo, Saitō postpones the duel, and leaves to kill Shibumi and Arundo.

Saitō then travels to Kyoto to fight Shishio under government orders. Along with Kenshin and Sanosuke, he assaults Shishio's battleship, the Purgatory. Accepting Shishio's challenge to fight on Mount Hiei, Saitō kills Uonuma Usui, one of the Juppongatana, and later ambushes Shishio, almost, but failing to kill him as Shishio had been wearing a hachigane (iron headband). Months later, Saitō is sent to arrest Yukishiro Enishi and he helps Kenshin fight against Six Comrades, defeating Yatsume Mumyōi. He also fights against the first of the four Sū-shin guards of Woo Heishin, Enishi's second-in-command, and defeats him. Afterwards, Saitō is transferred to work in another location after rejecting the continuation of his duel with Kenshin. Five years after the end of series, it is revealed that Saitō continues to work for the government.

In Rurouni Kenshin: The Hokkaido Arc, Saitō investigates Kenkaku Heiki who leads a mysterious group who claim to have been initially formed by ancestors in the Kamakura period who stopped the Mongol invasions of Japan. Having stayed hidden for over 500 years, they take over Mount Hakodate and launch other attacks in Japan in order to gain battle experience to fend off future foreign invasions. Saitō is severely wounded in combat by the leader of the Weapon Swordsmen Itekura Byakuya and contacts the former members of Shishio's men Seta Sojiro, Kamatari, Henya and Cho. Saito also calls for his former Shinsengumi ally Nagakura Shinpachi who also fought Kenshin during the Bakumatsu. In Sapporo, the former Shinsensgumi join forces again to fight Itekura Byakuya's allies including one who had a personal vendetta against Saito.

=== In other media ===
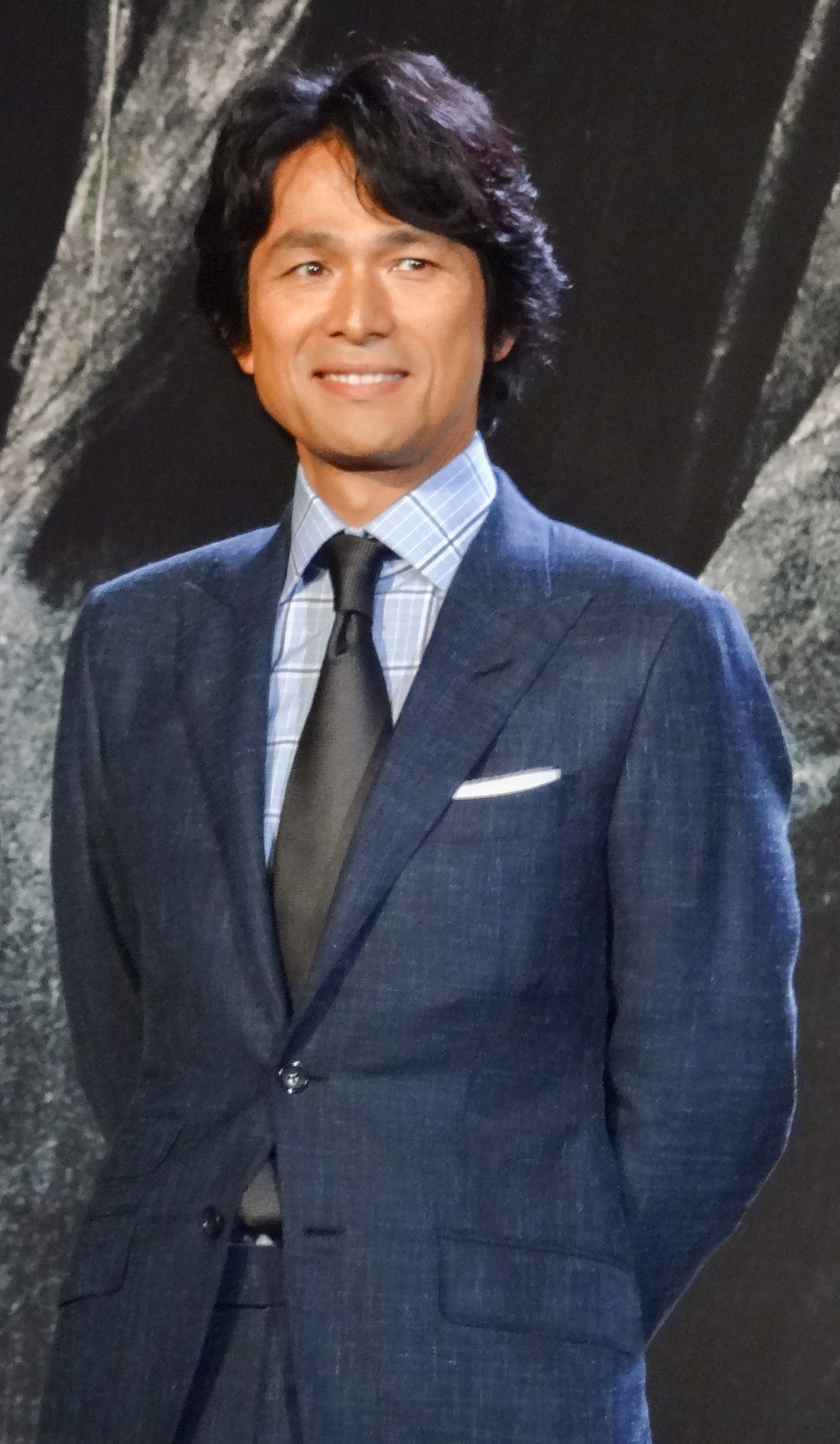
Yōsuke Eguchi portrays Saitō in the live-action films.

In the movie Rurouni Kenshin: The Motion Picture, Saitō is assigned by the government to stop the samurai Takimi Shigure from overthrowing the Meiji Government as an act of revenge. He also receives assistance from Himura Kenshin to protect a foreign minister from the rebels. Saitō makes an appearance in the two-part New Kyoto Arc movies, where some of his scenes and fights from the manga series are altered and removed.

Saitō also appears in both of the original video animation (OVA) series. In Rurouni Kenshin: Trust & Betrayal, his role and activities as a Shinsengumi captain during the Bakumatsu are depicted. As a result of his involvement in the Ikedaya Affair, he and his Shinsengumi comrades successfully prevent the burning of Kyoto by an extremist faction of the Ishin Shishi. His interactions with Okita Sōji as well as his first encounter with Himura Kenshin are also shown. Saitō has very brief cameo appearance in a flashback scene of Rurouni Kenshin: Reflection.

Saitō is also a playable character in the Rurouni Kenshin video games. He also appears in Jump Super Stars and Jump Ultimate Stars, but not as a playable character.

== Reception ==
The character of Saitō has been well received by manga readers and as the series continued he went on to become one of the most popular characters among the Rurouni Kenshin reader base, having consistently placed near the top of the Weekly Shōnen Jump character popularity polls of the series, ranking third in the last two. He has also ranked second in the "Who is Kenshin's Biggest Rival?" poll featuring all of Kenshin's opponents. Two polls by the official Rurouni Kenshin anime featured Saitō as one of the series' most popular characters. In the "Favorite Character Then" poll, Saitō was ranked third, while in the "Favorite Character Now" he was also placed third. Saitō's design initially received negative feedback from Shinsengumi fans who believed that Saitō had a more handsome face than the face Watsuki used. The author also recalled that one of the complaints criticized Saitō's selling of "Ishida powdered medicine" made by the Hijikata family, which Watsuki revealed he included as a joke. Later, Watsuki was pleased with the fact that Saitō's popularity with fans increased as the story progressed. A plethora of merchandise have been released in Saitō's likeness including figurines, keychains and wall scroll posters.

Several anime and manga publications have provided praise for Saitō. His fight scenes in the series, in particular, have also been acclaimed. While reviewing the volume 7 from the manga, Mania Entertainment writer Megan Lavey applauded the fight between Himura Kenshin and Saito Hajime at the Kamiya Dojo as the "high spot of the [Kyoto Arc] high spot". In the volume 14 review for the manga, Lavey described the end of the fight between Saitō and Usui as "very gruesome and not for the faint of heart". In the DVD volume 7 review for the anime, Mania Entertainment's Chris Beveridge described the fight scene between Saitō and Kenshin as "definitely choreographed well". He praised "the viciousness in the attacks, masked under their cold calculating facade" as being "wonderfully done, providing a real feel for these ultimate killers". His appearance in the OVAs has also received praise. Mike Crandol of Anime News Network states that during the character's brief appearances in the Rurouni Kenshin: Reflection OVA series, he appears to be "truly menacing." Mark A. Grey of Anime News Network said that the song "Hoeru Miburo (Howling Wolf of Mibu)" in the anime series "perfectly" represents the character. Reviewing the manga Restoration, Rebecca Silverman from Anime News Network felt Saitō's was interesting in regards to his philosophy as it contrasted Kenshin's but lamented his lack of appearances in this version. Daryl Surat from Otaku USA considers him as the greatest character from the series based on the impact he brings to the series during his introduction.

Nick Creamer from Anime News Network referred to Saitō as a "kind of tempter for Kenshin" due to his role in the series' first liveaction film. The Hollywood Reporter writer Clarence Sui praised Eguchi's work as Saitō during the Kyoto Inferno film during its opening scene as he confronts Shishio Makoto. For the live-action film Rurouni Kenshin: The Legend Ends, David West from Neo criticized how the character's philosophies never contrasts Kenshin's as while Saitō kills enemies, Kenshin refuses to do it and instead leaves them unconscious.

In retrospect, F. Liu from International Journal of Education and Humanities, Saito is said to carry his own bushido, Aku Soku Zan where Saito sticks to his values from the Bakumatsu despite the change of era and sees Kenshin's changed persona from a hitokiri to a wanderer as hypocrite. Despite his desire to kill Kenshin battle, the Government he serves forbids him from fighting Kenshin and instead become allies during the narrative, which forces him set aside his pride but still carry his own classic justice.
