= Hirotaka Suzuoki =

Japanese actor (1950–2006)

- 鈴置 洋孝
- Born: March 6, 1950; Nagoya, Aichi, Japan
- Died: August 6, 2006 (aged 56); Suginami, Tokyo, Japan
- Occupations: Actor; voice actor; narrator
- Years active: 1972–2006
- Agent: Ken Production
- Height: 166 cm (5 ft 5 in)

Hirotaka Suzuoki (鈴置 洋孝, Suzuoki Hirotaka; March 6, 1950 – August 6, 2006) was a Japanese actor, voice actor and narrator from Nagoya, Aichi Prefecture, who graduated from Tokyo Keizai University.

His best known roles include Bright Noa in Mobile Suit Gundam, Kojirou Hyuga in Captain Tsubasa, Dragon Shiryū in Saint Seiya, Tenshinhan in Dragon Ball, Starscream in The Transformers, Tatewaki Kuno in Ranma ½, Saitō Hajime in Rurouni Kenshin, Giovanni in Pokémon, and Banjō Haran in Invincible Steel Man Daitarn 3. He was also the official Japanese dub voice for Tom Cruise and John Travolta.

Suzuoki died from lung cancer on August 6, 2006, at the age of 56.

== Career ==
Suzuoki was affiliated with Ken Production, making his voice acting debut in 1972 in Devilman. He was known for his soft, dignified voice.

Suzuoki was friends with fellow voice actor Tōru Furuya, who co-starred with him in several series. Suzuoki felt that Furuya's portrayal of Yamcha was closer to his own personality than that of Tenshinhan, whom Suzuoki voiced.

== Death ==
Suzuoki was a heavy smoker and drinker. In July 2006, Suzuoki was diagnosed with lung cancer and underwent hospitalization and medical treatment. On the morning of August 6, 2006, his health declined, and Suzuoki died at the age of 56. His ongoing roles were replaced by other voice actors.

His last voice role was as Bright Noa in Mobile Suit Z Gundam III: Love is the Pulse of the Stars.

== Voice roles ==
=== Television animation ===
1970s

- Chōdenji Machine Voltes V (1977)
- Yakyū-kyō no Uta (1977) (Ryo Kusakabe)
- Invincible Steel Man Daitarn 3 (1978) (Haran Banjou)
- Mobile Suit Gundam (1979) (Bright Noa)

1980s

- Space Battleship Yamato III (1980) (Kojirou Ohta)
- GoShogun (1981) (Hojo Shingo)
- Miss Machiko (1981) (Bruce, Tarō Akiyama)
- Tokimeki Tonight (1982–1983) (Aaron)
- Macross (1982) (Lynn Kaifun)
- Captain Tsubasa (1983) (Kojirō Hyuga)
- Genesis Climber MOSPEADA (1983) (Yellow Belmont)
- Super Dimension Century Orguss (1983) (Olson D. Vern)
- Choriki Robo Galatt (1984) (Kamil Kashmir Jr.)
- Star Musketeer Bismark (1984) (Perios)
- Super Dimension Cavalry Southern Cross (1984) (Dess)
- Mobile Suit Zeta Gundam (1985) (Bright Noa)
- Mobile Suit Gundam ZZ (1986) (Bright Noa)
- Saint Seiya (1986) (Dragon Shiryu)
- Dragon Ball (1987) (Tenshinhan)
- Fist of the North Star 2 (1987) (Shachi)
- Sakigake!! Otokojuku (1988) (Omito Date)
- Dragon Ball Z (1989) (Tenshinhan, World Tournament Announcer, Alien Announcer, Karoni)
- Ranma ½ (1989) (Tatewaki Kuno)
- Dragon Quest (1989) (Baharata)

1990s

- Idol Angel Yokoso Yoko (1990) (Hideki Yamashita)
- Tekkaman Blade (1992) (Chief Freeman)
- Fatal Fury 2: The New Battle (1993) (Wolfgang Krauser)
- Dragon Ball GT (1996) (Tenshinhan, Dolltaki, Wû Xing Lóng (Five Star Dragon))
- Rurouni Kenshin (1996) (Saitō Hajime)
- Sailor Moon Sailor Stars (1996) (Yuji Kayama/Sailor Guts)
- Pocket Monsters (1997) (Sakaki (Giovanni))
- Virus Buster Serge (1997) (Raven)
- Cyber Team in Akihabara (1998) (Washu Ryugasaki)
- Trigun (1998) (Chapel the Evergreen)
- Crest of the Stars (1999) (Dubeusec)
- Pocket Monsters: Episode Orange Archipelago (1999) (Sakaki)
- Pocket Monsters: Episode Gold & Silver (1999) (Sakaki)

2000s

- Shukan Storyland (2000) (Satoru Shintani)
- Banner of the Stars (2000) (Dubeusec)
- Kiddy Grade (2002) (Dextera)
- Pocket Monsters Side Stories (2002) (Sakaki)
- Pocket Monsters: Advanced Generation (2002) (Sakaki)
- Requiem from the Darkness (2003) (Genba Sasayama)
- Kotencotenco (2006) (Yakku)

=== Original video animations ===
- Genesis Climber MOSPEADA: Love Live Alive (1985) (Yellow Belmont)
- Prefectural Earth Defense Force (1986) (Kamir Santin)
- M.D. Geist (1986) (Mash)
- Urotsukidōji (1987) (Tatsuo Nagumo)
- Guy: Double Target (1990) (Zena)
- Urusei Yatsura: Inaba the Dreammaker (1987) (Inaba)
- Legend of the Galactic Heroes (1988) (Ivan Konev and Ruppert Kesserlink)
- Salamander (1988) as Lord British
- Urusei Yatsura: Raging Sherbet (1988) (Inaba)
- Video Girl Ai (1992) (Ai's creator)
- JoJo's Bizarre Adventure (1993) (Noriaki Kakyoin)
- Blue Submarine No. 6 (1998) (Yuri Malakofsky)
- Rurouni Kenshin: Tsuioku-hen (1999) (Saitō Hajime)
- Amon: The Apocalpyse of the Devilman (2000) (Zuubo)
- Nangoku Shōnen Papuwa-kun (2000) (Harlem)

=== Theatrical animation ===
- Mobile Suit Gundam (1981) (Bright Noa)
- Mobile Suit Gundam: Soldiers of Sorrow (1981) (Bright Noa)
- Mobile Suit Gundam: Encounters in Space (1982) (Bright Noa)
- Macross: Do You Remember Love? (1984) (Lynn Kaifun)
- Arion (1986) (Apollon)
- They Were Eleven (1986) (Amazon Carnias)
- Royal Space Force: The Wings of Honnêamise (1987) (Domorhot)
- Dragon Ball: Mystical Adventure (1988) (Tenshinhan)
- Mobile Suit Gundam: Char's Counterattack (1988) (Bright Noa)
- Urusei Yatsura: The Final Chapter (1988) (Inaba)
- Dragon Ball Z: The Tree of Might (1990) (Tenshinhan)
- Dragon Ball Z: Bojack Unbound (1993) (Tenshinhan)
- Slam Dunk: The Movie (1994) (Tatsumasa Oda)
- Rurouni Kenshin: Requiem for the Ishin Patriots (1997) (Saitō Hajime)
- Pocket Monsters the Movie: Mewtwo Strikes Back (1998) (Sakaki)
- Millennium Actress (2002) (Junichi Ōtaki)
- Detective Conan: Crossroad in the Ancient Capital (2003) (Taiga Saijo)
- Naruto the Movie: Snow Princess' Book of Ninja Arts (2004) (Nadare Roga)
- Mobile Suit Zeta Gundam: A New Translation - Heirs to the Stars (2005) (Bright Noa)
- Mobile Suit Zeta Gundam: A New Translation II - Lovers (2005) (Bright Noa)
- Mobile Suit Zeta Gundam: A New Translation III - Love is the Pulse of the Stars (2006) (Bright Noa)

=== Tokusatsu ===
- Denji Sentai Megaranger (1997–1998) - Yugande (eps. 1 - 31, 33 - 50)

=== Video games ===
- Angel's Feather (Shion Toudou)
- Captain Tsubasa 5: Hasha no Shogo Campione (Kojirō Hyuga)
- Growlanser III: The Dual Darkness (Viktor Hugo)
- Rockman X5-X7 (Signas)
- Rockman X7 (Splash Wafly)
- Super Robot War/Scramble series (Bright Noa, Haran Banjou, Shingo Hojo)
- Mobile Suit Gundam series (Bright Noa)
- Rurouni Kenshin: Enjou! Kyoto Rinne (Saito Hajime)
- Various Dragon Ball games (Tenshinhan)
- Another Century's Episode Series (Bright Noa; archival audio in Episode 3)

=== Drama CDs ===
- Analyst no Yuutsu series 2: Koi no Risk wa Hansenai (Isao Washizaki)
- Analyst no Yuutsu series 3: Yuuwaku no Target Price (Isao Washizaki)
- Analyst no Yuutsu series 4 (crossover with 3 Ji Kara Koi wo Suru series): Ai to Yokubou no Kinyuugai (Isao Washizaki)
- Analyst no Yuutsu series 5: Ai no Rating AAA (Isao Washizaki)
- Chougonka ~Song of Eternal Hatred~ (Koujirou Samon)
- Danna-sama, Ote wo Douzo (Takeshi Mochizuki)
- Eden wo Tooku ni Hanarete series 3: Setsunai Yoru no Rakuen (Shinobu Takahashi)
- Miscast series 8 & 11 (Takamizawa)
- Okane ga nai series 4: Okane ja Kaenai (Kiyotaka Konomi)
- Open Sesame (Hisama Kanoe)
- Pearl series 1: Ijiwaru na Pearl (Masami Houjou)
- Pearl series 2: Yokubari na Pearl (Masami Houjou)
- Pearl series 3: Wagamama na Pearl (Masami Houjou)
- Pearl series 4: Kimagure na Pearl (Masami Houjou)
- Tsunehiko Shiragane 1 & 2 (Seiichi Kurosaki)

=== Dubbing roles ===
==== Live-action ====
- Tom Cruise
  - Born on the Fourth of July (VHS edition) (Ron Kovic)
  - Days of Thunder (1993 TBS edition) (Cole Trickle)
  - Far and Away (Joseph Donnelly)
  - A Few Good Men (Lieutenant Daniel Kaffee)
  - The Firm (Mitch McDeere)
  - Interview with the Vampire (Lestat de Lioncourt)
  - Mission: Impossible (Ethan Hunt)
  - Mission: Impossible 2 (Ethan Hunt)
  - Vanilla Sky (David Aames)
- John Travolta
  - Grease (1987 TV Asahi edition) (Danny Zuko)
  - Chains of Gold (Scott Barnes)
  - Pulp Fiction (Vincent Vega)
  - White Man's Burden (Louis Pinnock)
  - Broken Arrow (Maj. Vic 'Deak' Deakins)
- Mel Gibson
  - Mad Max 2 (1991 TBS edition) ("Mad" Max Rockatansky)
  - Lethal Weapon (1988 TBS edition) (Martin Riggs)
  - Lethal Weapon 2 (1992 TBS edition) (Martin Riggs)
- Gary Sinise
  - Forrest Gump (2000 Fuji TV edition) (Dan Taylor)
  - Apollo 13 (2003 Fuji TV edition) (Ken Mattingly)
  - Mission to Mars (Jim McConnell)
- Dylan McDermott
  - Steel Magnolias (Jackson Latcherie)
  - In the Line of Fire (Al D'Andrea)
  - Miracle on 34th Street (Bryan Bedford)
- The 6th Day (2002 NTV edition) (Michael Drucker (Tony Goldwyn))
- Aliens (1989 TV Asahi edition) (Daniel Spunkmeyer (Daniel Kash))
- American Graffiti (1984 TBS edition) (John Milner (Paul Le Mat))
- Autumn in New York (Will Keane (Richard Gere))
- Bad Boys II (Hector Juan Carlos "Johnny" Tapia (Jordi Mollà))
- Blue Steel (Nick Mann (Clancy Brown))
- Breaking Away (1984 NTV edition) (Mike (Dennis Quaid))
- Casualties of War (Private First Class Antonio Dìaz (John Leguizamo))
- Child's Play (Charles Lee Ray / Chucky (Brad Dourif))
- Child's Play 3 (Brett C. Shelton (Travis Fine))
- Cop Land (2000 NTV edition) (Officer Gary "Figgsy" Figgis (Ray Liotta))
- Das Boot (1983 Fuji TV edition) (2nd Watch Officer (Martin Semmelrogge))
- Dragonheart (Einon (David Thewlis and Lee Oakes))
- Frankenstein (1996 TV Asahi edition) (Victor Frankenstein (Kenneth Branagh))
- Galaxy Quest (Jason Nesmith (Tim Allen))
- Ghost (1993 Fuji TV edition) (Carl Bruner (Tony Goldwyn))
- Ghostbusters II (Louis Tully (Rick Moranis))
- Holy Man (Scott Hawkes (Eric McCormack))
- Kindergarten Cop (Cullen Crisp (Richard Tyson))
- The Living Daylights (1998 TV Asahi edition) (James Bond (Timothy Dalton))
- The Object of My Affection (Dr. Robert Joley (Tim Daly))
- The Piano (Alistair Stewart (Sam Neill))
- Speed 2: Cruise Control (2000 Fuji TV edition) (Alex Shaw (Jason Patric))
- Stakeout (1991 Fuji TV edition) (Det. Bill Reimers (Emilio Estevez))
- Twin Peaks (Dennis/Denise Bryson (David Duchovny))
- Wayne's World (Benjamin Kane (Rob Lowe))
- The Wraith (1992 TV Asahi edition) (Packard Walsh (Nick Cassavetes))

==== Animation ====
- The Lord of the Rings (Frodo Baggins)
- Titan A.E. (Preed)
- The Transformers (Starscream, Powerglide, Slingshot, Devcon)
