= Atsuko Nakajima =

Japanese animator, character designer, and illustrator

- 中嶋敦子
- Born: December 21, 1961 (age 64); Kanagawa Prefecture, Japan
- Occupations: Animator and character designer
- Notable work: Ranma 1/2 anime Trinity Blood anime
- Spouse: Tomohiro Hirata

Atsuko Nakajima (中嶋敦子, Nakajima Atsuko; born December 21, 1961 in Kanagawa, Japan) is a Japanese animator, character designer, and illustrator. She is married to anime director and animator Tomohiro Hirata, with whom she also collaborated in the Trinity Blood anime (in which Nakajima was character designer and Hirata was director).

Ms. Nakajima is strongly associated with the animated adaptations of the works of Rumiko Takahashi produced by Kitty Films, having worked as an animation director on Urusei Yatsura, Ranma ½ and Maison Ikkoku and as a character designer on Ranma ½.

== Filmography ==
- Cookin' Idol I! My! Mine! (TV): character designer
- Fruits Basket (TV): genga artist
- GetBackers (TV): animation director, character designer
- Haunted Junction (TV): character designer
- Jin Roh: animator
- Komi Can't Communicate (TV): character designer
- Maison Ikkoku (TV): animation director
- Maria-sama ga Miteru second season onward: character designer for the ED sequence, promotional pictures
- Mon Colle Knights (TV): character designer
- Oh My Goddess! The Movie: animator
- Power of Hope: PreCure Full Bloom (TV): character designer
- Princess Princess (TV): character designer
- Project A-ko: animator
- Ranma ½: animation director, character designer
- Rurouni Kenshin (TV): animation director
- Sword Gai Sword: The Animation (ONA): character designer
- The Irresponsible Captain Tylor: animator
- Tokyo Ghoul:re (TV): character designer
- Trinity Blood (TV): character designer
- Urusei Yatsura (TV): animation director
- Urusei Yatsura 1: Only You: in between artist
- Urusei Yatsura 3: Remember My Love: animator
- Urusei Yatsura 4: Lum the Forever: animator
- You're Under Arrest: character designer
- You're Under Arrest: The Movie: character designer
- You're Under Arrest: Full Throttle: character designer
- Violinist of Hameln (TV): character designer
