= Inuyasha (TV series) =

Japanese anime television series

- 犬夜叉
- Type: TV series
- Genre: Adventure; Fantasy; Romance
- Based on: Inuyasha
- Created by: Rumiko Takahashi
- Directed by: Masashi Ikeda (1–44); Yasunao Aoki (45–167)
- Series composition: Katsuyuki Sumisawa
- Character designer: Yoshihito Hishinuma
- Music by: Kaoru Wada
- No. of episodes: 167 (list of episodes)

Production
- Art director: Shigemi Ikeda
- Sound director: Yōta Tsuruoka
- Cinematographers: Kumiko Itō; Yōichi Ōgami
- Color designer: Miyuki Satō
- Editor: Tomoaki Tsurubuchi
- Studio: Sunrise
- Producers: Michihiko Suwa; Hideyuki Tomioka
- Production companies: Yomiuri TV; Sunrise

Original release
- Networks: NNS (YTV, NTV)
- Release: October 16, 2000 – September 13, 2004

Related
- Anime television series

Inuyasha: The Final Act
- Directed by: Yasunao Aoki
- Produced by: Tomoyuki Saito; Mitomu Asai; Naohiro Ogata
- Written by: Katsuyuki Sumisawa
- Music by: Kaoru Wada
- Studio: Sunrise
- Original network: YTV, NTV, TSB, FCT, KKT
- English network: NA: Neon Alley; SEA: Animax; US: Adult Swim (Toonami)
- Original run: October 4, 2009 – March 30, 2010
- Episodes: 26
- Sequel spin-off
- Yashahime (2020–2022)

Inuyasha (Japanese: 犬夜叉) is a Japanese anime television series based on Rumiko Takahashi's manga series Inuyasha. Produced by Sunrise, the series aired on Yomiuri TV, Nippon Television and their affiliates from October 2000 to September 2004. Since then, it has spanned four films, video games, toys, merchandise and a sequel, covering the last chapters of the manga, titled Inuyasha: The Final Act, which aired from October 2009 to March 2010.

== Cast ==
Character	Japanese voice actor	English voice actor (Viz Media)	English voice actor (Animax)
Inuyasha	Kappei Yamaguchi	Richard Ian Cox	Darren Pleavin
Kagome Higurashi	Satsuki Yukino	Moneca Stori	Andrea Kwan
Miroku	Kōji Tsujitani	Kirby Morrow	Dave Bridges
Sango	Hōko Kuwashima	Kelly Sheridan	Candice Moore
Shippo	Kumiko Watanabe	Jillian Michaels	Candice Moore
Kikyo	Noriko Hidaka	Willow Johnson	Andrea Kwan
Sesshomaru	Ken Narita	David Kaye	Russell Wait
Naraku	Toshiyuki Morikawa	Paul Dobson	Russell Wait

== Production and release ==
The first Inuyasha anime adaptation, was broadcast for 167 episodes on YTV, NTV and their affiliates from October 16, 2000, to September 13, 2004. Avex collected the episodes in a total of seven series of DVD volumes distributed in Japan between May 30, 2001, and July 27, 2005. (Note: First series had 9 DVDs; second series had 10 DVDs; third series had 10 DVDs; fourth series had 5 DVDs; fifth series had 8 DVDs; sixth series had 10 DVDs; seventh series had 3 DVDs.) From December 2021 to May 2022, Avex Pictures released all 167 episodes of the series across four Japanese Blu-ray box sets, marking the first time the series was released in this format. The episodes were digitally remastered and presented in 16:9. Bonus materials included footage in the original 4:3 aspect ratio, textless opening and ending sequences, and soundtrack CDs.

In North America, the series was licensed for an English dub release by Viz Media. The series was first run on Adult Swim from August 31, 2002, to October 27, 2006, with reruns from 2006 to 2014. When Toonami became a block on Adult Swim, Inuyasha aired there from November 2012 to March 2014, when the network announced that they had lost the broadcast rights to the series. On August 25, 2017, Starz announced that they would be offering episodes of the series for their video on demand service starting on September 1 of that same year, where they were available until November 30, 2018. The series aired in Canada on YTV's Bionix programming block from September 5, 2003, to December 1, 2006. Viz collected the series in a total of 55 DVD volumes, while seven box sets were also released. In September 2020, Funimation announced that they would begin streaming the first 54 episodes of the series and the four films.

After the series concluded in September 2004, producer Michihiko Suwa admitted that the ending might have seemed abrupt because the manga was still being serialized. Suwa reported receiving hundreds of viewer comments, many of which requested that the anime resume or provide a more complete conclusion.

=== Inuyasha: The Final Act ===
In July 2009, it was announced that another anime television series adaptation, covering the original 36–56 volumes of the manga, would be made by the first anime's same cast and crew. Titled Inuyasha: The Final Act (犬夜叉 完結編, Inuyasha Kanketsu-hen), the series was broadcast for 26 episodes on Nippon TV and Yomiuri TV from October 4, 2009, to March 30, 2010. (Note: The series first premiered on Nippon TV and two days later on Yomiuri TV. Nippon TV listed the series premiere on Saturday at 26:20, which is effectively Sunday at 2:20 a.m. JST. Despite the series first premiering on Nippon TV, it completed its first premiere run on Yomiuri TV on March 30, 2010, days ahead of Nippon TV on April 4, due to the latter network suspending series broadcast for one week back on January 3 due to special programming.) In other parts of Asia, the series was broadcast in the same week as its broadcast in Japan on Animax Asia. Aniplex collected the episodes on seven DVDs, released between December 23, 2009, and June 23, 2010.

In North America, the series was licensed by Viz Media, and the episodes were simulcast via Hulu and Viz Media's Shonen Sunday site in the United States. Viz Media released the series in two DVD and Blu-ray sets, which included an English dub. The first thirteen episodes, constituting the first set, were released on November 20, 2012, and the last thirteen episodes, constituting the second set, were released on February 12, 2013. The series began broadcasting in the United States and Canada on Viz Media's online network, Neon Alley, on October 2, 2012. On October 24, 2014, it was announced that Adult Swim would air The Final Act on the Toonami block, beginning on November 15, at 2:00 a.m. EST.

=== Films ===
There are four animated Inuyasha films with original storylines written by Katsuyuki Sumisawa, the writer for the Inuyasha anime series. All were released in Japan in the month of December of their respective release years. The films were released with English subtitles and dubs on Region 1 DVD by Viz Media. Together, the four films have earned over US$20 million at Japanese box offices.

The first film, Inuyasha the Movie: Affections Touching Across Time, was released in 2001. In the film, Inuyasha and his friends confront Menomaru, a demonic moth warrior brought to life by one of the shards.

In the second film, Inuyasha the Movie: The Castle Beyond the Looking Glass, released in 2002, the group seemingly kills Naraku for good and returns to their normal lives, only to encounter a new enemy named Kaguya, a character based on the literature The Tale of the Bamboo Cutter.

The third film, Inuyasha the Movie: Swords of an Honorable Ruler, was released in 2003. In it, Inuyasha and Sesshomaru forcefully work together to seal the evil Sō'unga, their father's third sword, when it is awakened from its sheath.

The fourth and final film, Inuyasha the Movie: Fire on the Mystic Island, was released in 2004. It follows Inuyasha and his friends protecting a group of half-demon children from four evil demons on an ancient mystical island.

=== Other media ===
Viz Media released a separate series of ani-manga volumes, which are derived from full-color screenshots of the anime episodes. 30 volumes were released from January 14, 2004, to December 9, 2008.

== Video games ==
Three video games based on the series were released for the WonderSwan: Inuyasha: Kagome no Sengoku Nikki (犬夜叉 〜かごめの戦国日記, Inuyasha: Kagome's Warring States Diary), Inuyasha: Fūun Emaki (犬夜叉 風雲絵巻, Inuyasha: The Sealed Scroll Picture), and Inuyasha: Kagome no Yume Nikki (犬夜叉 かごめの夢日記, Inuyasha: Kagome's Dream Diary).

A single title, Inuyasha: Naraku no Wana! Mayoi no Mori no Shōtaijō (犬夜叉〜奈落の罠!迷いの森の招待状, Inuyasha: Naraku's Trap! Invitation to the Forest of Illusion), was released for the Game Boy Advance on January 23, 2003, in Japan.

Inuyasha has been adapted into a mobile game released for Java and Brew handsets on June 21, 2005.

Two titles were released for the PlayStation: an RPG simply titled Inuyasha, and the fighting game Inuyasha: A Feudal Fairy Tale, the latter of which was released in North America. For the PlayStation 2, the two released games were the RPG Inuyasha: The Secret of the Cursed Mask and the fighting game Inuyasha: Feudal Combat, which also received an English version. An English-only RPG, Inuyasha: Secret of the Divine Jewel, was released for the Nintendo DS on January 23, 2007.

== Music ==
The score for the series was composed by Kaoru Wada. The original series features six opening themes and eight ending themes. The first opening theme is titled "Change the World" performed by V6 and used from episodes 1–34, for episodes 35–64, the opening theme is titled "I am" performed by Hitomi, for episodes 65–95, the opening theme is titled "Owarinai yume (終わりない夢)" performed by Nanase Aikawa, for episodes 96–127, the opening theme is titled "Grip!" performed by Every Little Thing, for episodes 128–153, the opening theme is titled "One Day, One Dream" performed by Tackey & Tsubasa and the final opening theme is titled "Angelus", performed by Hitomi Shimatani and used until episode 167. For episodes 1–20, the ending theme is titled "My Will" by Dream, the second ending theme is titled "Fukai Mori", performed by Do As Infinity and used from episodes 21–41, the third ending theme is titled "Dearest", performed by Ayumi Hamasaki and used from episodes 42–60, the fourth ending theme is titled "Every Heart (Minna no Kimochi)", performed by BoA and used from episodes 61–85, the fifth ending theme is titled "Shinjitsu no Uta" performed by Do As Infinity, the sixth ending theme is titled "Itazura na Kiss (イタズラなKISS) performed by Day After Tomorrow, the seventh ending theme is titled "Come" performed by Namie Amuro and used for episodes 128–146 and the final ending theme is titled "Brand-New World", performed by V6 and used until episode 165.

=== Character songs ===
Multiple soundtracks and character songs were released for the series by Avex Mode. Three character singles were released August 3, 2005 – "Aoki Yasei o Daite" (蒼き野生を抱いて; lit. 'Embrace the Untamed Wilderness') by Kappei Yamaguchi featuring Satsuki Yukino as their characters, "Kaze no Naka e" (風のなかへ; lit. 'Into the Wind') by Kōji Tsujitani featuring Hōko Kuwashima and Kumiko Watanabe as their characters, and "Gō" (業; lit. 'Fate') by Ken Narita featuring Yuichi Nagashima and Mamiko Noto as their characters. The singles charted at number 63, 76, and 79, respectively, on the Oricon chart. Three more character songs were released on January 25, 2006 – "Rakujitsu" (落日; lit. 'Setting Sun') by Toshiyuki Morikawa as his character, "Tatta Hitotsu no Yakusoku" (たったひとつの約束; lit. 'That's One Promise') by Yukino as her character, and "Abarero!!" (暴れろ!!; lit. 'Go on a Rampage!!') by Takeshi Kusao and Ai Orikasa as their characters. The singles charted at number 130, 131, and 112, respectively, on the Oricon chart.

On March 24, 2010, Avex released Inuyasha Best Song History (犬夜叉 ベストソング ヒストリー, Inuyasha Besuto Songu Hisutorī), a best album that contains all the opening and ending theme songs used in the series. The album peaked at number 20 on the Oricon album chart and charted for seven weeks.

== Reception ==
Inuyasha won the Excellence Award in the Television Animation category at the 2002 Tokyo Anime Awards and was runner-up in 2003. The series ranked 20th in a 2006 online Japanese survey conducted by TV Asahi of the 100 best anime series. In ICv2's Anime Awards from both 2004 and 2005, the series was the winner in the category of Property of the Year. In the Anime Grand Prix polls by Animage, Inuyasha has appeared various times in the category of Best Anime, taking third place in 2003. In the American Anime Awards from 2007, Inuyasha was a nominee in the categories of Best Cast, Best Long Series, and Best Anime Feature, but lost to Fullmetal Alchemist and Final Fantasy VII: Advent Children, respectively. A 2019 NHK poll of 210,061 people resulted in Inuyasha being named Takahashi's best animated work. Inuyasha and Sesshomaru were voted first and third place, respectively, in her characters category.

The English DVDs from the series had sold over one million copies between March 2003 and November 2004, with the first film's DVD topping the Nielsen VideoScan anime bestseller list for three weeks. By 2016, Viz Media had sold more than 2 million Inuyasha home video units. Mania Entertainment listed the series in an article ranking anime series that needed a reboot, criticizing the series' repetitiveness.
