= InuYasha (disambiguation) =

InuYasha is a Japanese media franchise.

InuYasha may also refer to:

- Inuyasha (character), the main character in Inuyasha media

== Films ==
- Inuyasha the Movie: Affections Touching Across Time
- Inuyasha the Movie: The Castle Beyond the Looking Glass
- Inuyasha the Movie: Swords of an Honorable Ruler
- Inuyasha the Movie: Fire on the Mystic Island

== Video games ==
- Inuyasha (video game), a 2001 role-playing game developed by Bandai
- Inuyasha: A Feudal Fairy Tale
- Inuyasha: The Secret of the Cursed Mask
- Inuyasha: Feudal Combat
- Inuyasha: Secret of the Divine Jewel
- Inuyasha: Kagome no Sengoku Nikki
- Inuyasha: Fūun Emaki
- Inuyasha: Kagome no Yume Nikki
- Inuyasha: Naraku no Wana! Mayoi no Mori no Shōtaijō
