= Francesco Pezzulli =

Italian actor (born 1973)

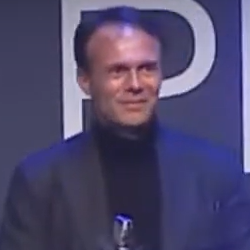
- Pezzulli in 2017
- Born: 14 May 1973 (age 53); Naples, Italy
- Occupations: Actor; voice actor; dubbing director
- Years active: 1983–present
- Children: 2
- Relatives: Bepi Pezzulli (brother)

Francesco Pezzulli (born 14 May 1973) is an Italian actor and voice actor.

== Biography ==
Born in Naples, Pezzulli began his career as a child actor on film and television in 1982, but he is best known as a voice actor, well noted for providing the official Italian-dubbed voice of Leonardo DiCaprio. Some of Pezzulli's popular Italian voice roles include Dawson Leery (portrayed by James Van Der Beek) in Dawson's Creek, Jesse Pinkman (portrayed by Aaron Paul) in Breaking Bad and Anakin Skywalker (portrayed by Hayden Christensen) in the Star Wars prequel trilogy.

Pezzulli has dubbed many animated characters, most notably Inuyasha from the series with the same name, Crash in the Ice Age franchise and Elliot in Open Season.

=== Personal life ===
Pezzulli is the younger brother of corporate hedge funds lawyer Bepi Pezzulli. He also has two sons, Sebastiano and Costantino. He currently lives in Rome.

== Filmography ==
- Anna, Ciro e... compagnia - TV series (1982)
- La Nouvelle Malle des Indes - TV series, episode 1.3 (1982)
- Sfrattato cerca casa equo canone (1983)
- Una donna per amico - TV series (1998)
- Amanti e Segreti - TV series (2005)

== Voice work ==
=== Animated roles ===
- Roberto and Vetturino in How the Toys Saved Christmas
- Rakhal in Il principe dei dinosauri (English title: The Prince of Dinosaurs)
- Karl in Princess Sissi
- Sandokan in Sandokan - La tigre della Malesia
- Helia in Winx Club (seasons 2-3)
- Cavaliere dei principi perduti in Bentornato Pinocchio
- Jules Verne in Le straordinarie avventure di Jules Verne
- Francis of Assisi in Francesco

==== Italian-dubbed animated roles ====
- Inuyasha in Inuyasha (seasons 2-6), Inuyasha the Movie: Affections Touching Across Time, Inuyasha the Movie: The Castle Beyond the Looking Glass, Inuyasha the Movie: Swords of an Honorable Ruler, Inuyasha the Movie: Fire on the Mystic Island
- Crash in Ice Age: The Meltdown, Ice Age: Dawn of the Dinosaurs, Ice Age: Continental Drift, Ice Age: Collision Course
- Elliot in Open Season, Open Season 2, Open Season 3 Open Season: Scared Silly
- Anakin Skywalker in Star Wars: Clone Wars, Star Wars: The Clone Wars
- Nuka in The Lion King II: Simba's Pride, The Lion Guard
- Sonic in Wreck-It Ralph, Ralph Breaks the Internet
- Shelby (episode 6.23), Dolph Starbeam (seasons 8-12), Roy (episode 8,14), Nelson Muntz (seasons 16-17), Homer Glumpet, Justin Timberlake, Leonardo DiCaprio, Larry Doogan and other voices in The Simpsons
- James and Jason Derrick in Captain Tsubasa
- Joaquín Mondragon Jr. in The Book of Life
- Kevin in Ed, Edd n Eddy
- Lucien Cramp in The Cramp Twins
- Sam Speed in Sonic X
- Prince Naveen in The Princess and the Frog
- Garth in Alpha and Omega
- Señor Senior Jr. in Kim Possible (2nd voice)
- Peng in Duck Duck Goose
- Sacha in Noah's Island
- Dwayne in Total Drama
- Karl in Princess Sissi (1st voice)
- Mark Beaks in DuckTales
- Andrew in Rapunzel's Tangled Adventure
- Zini in Dinosaur
- Justforkix in Asterix and the Vikings

=== Live action roles ===
- Leonardo DiCaprio's look-alike in Paparazzi

==== Italian-dubbed roles ====
- Anakin Skywalker in Star Wars: Episode II – Attack of the Clones, Star Wars: Episode III – Revenge of the Sith, Star Wars: Episode IX – The Rise of Skywalker
- Bobby Drake / Iceman in X2, X-Men: The Last Stand, X-Men: Days of Future Past
- Jesse Swanson in Pitch Perfect, Pitch Perfect 2
- Xavier in Pot Luck, Russian Dolls
- Jesse Pinkman in Breaking Bad, El Camino: A Breaking Bad Movie
- James Van Der Beek in Don't Trust the B— in Apartment 23, Jay and Silent Bob Strike Back
- Romeo Montague in William Shakespeare's Romeo + Juliet
- Jack Dawson in Titanic
- Brandon Darrow in Celebrity
- Richard in The Beach
- Amsterdam Vallon in Gangs of New York
- Frank Abagnale in Catch Me If You Can
- Howard Hughes in The Aviator
- Danny Archer in Blood Diamond
- William Costigan in The Departed
- Leonardo DiCaprio in The 11th Hour
- Roger Ferris in Body of Lies
- Frank Wheeler in Revolutionary Road
- Teddy Daniels in Shutter Island
- Dom Cobb in Inception
- Jim Carroll in The Basketball Diaries
- J. Edgar Hoover in J. Edgar
- Calvin J. Candie in Django Unchained
- Jay Gatsby in The Great Gatsby
- Jordan Belfort in The Wolf of Wall Street
- Hugh Glass in The Revenant
- Rick Dalton in Once Upon a Time in Hollywood
- Alex Kerner in Good Bye, Lenin!
- Salvador Puig Antich in Salvador
- Lukas in 2 Days in Paris
- Fredrick Zoller in Inglourious Basterds
- David Kern in Lila, Lila
- Álex in Eva
- Niki Lauda in Rush
- Daniel Domscheit-Berg in The Fifth Estate
- Max in A Most Wanted Man
- Hubertus Czernin in Woman in Gold
- Daniel in Colonia
- Tony Balerdi in Burnt
- Helmut Zemo in Captain America: Civil War
- Inspector Escherich in Alone in Berlin
- Lutz Heck in The Zookeeper's Wife
- Laszlo Kreizler in The Alienist
- Dawson Leery in Dawson's Creek
- Will Stokes in Friends with Better Lives
- Matt Bromley in Pose
- Rick Sanford in Angus
- Anesthesiologist in Downsizing
- Tobey Marshall in Need for Speed
- J.J. Maguire in A Long Way Down
- Phil Stanton in Central Intelligence
- Bryan Palmer in Welcome Home
- Eddie Lane in The Path
- Stephen Glass in Shattered Glass
- Billy Quinn in Factory Girl
- David Rice in Jumper
- Lorenzo de Lamberti in Virgin Territory
- Eric in The Ruins
- James Lacey in The Escapist
- Howard Stark in Captain America: The First Avenger
- Henry Sturges in Abraham Lincoln: Vampire Hunter
- Mitch Brockden in Reasonable Doubt
- Llane Wrynn in Warcraft
- Ollie Slocumb in Igby Goes Down
- Martijn in Five Fingers
- Shane Dekker in Chaos
- Eric O'Neill in Breach
- Louis Ross Roulet in The Lincoln Lawyer
- Thomas Seyr in The Beat That My Heart Skipped
- Pierre in Paris
- Manu in Dobermann
- Louis Échard in Populaire
- Seth MacFarlane in Movie 43
- Gordie Lachance in Stand by Me
- Richard "Data" Wang in The Goonies
- Clay Miller in Friday the 13th
- Jake Sully in Avatar
- Daryl Dixon in The Walking Dead
- Marty Deeks in NCIS: Los Angeles
- Todd Quinlan in Scrubs
- Sportacus in LazyTown
- Ramsay Bolton in Game of Thrones
- Clyde Barrow in Bonnie & Clyde
- Jim Hawkins in Muppet Treasure Island
- Tom Stansfield in My Boss's Daughter
- Matthew in The Dreamers
- Blake in Last Days
- Hervé Joncour in Silk
- Paul in Funny Games
- Justin Redman in DodgeBall: A True Underdog Story
- Matthew Farrell in Live Free or Die Hard
- Todd in Serious Moonlight
- Sherlock Holmes in Sherlock

=== Dub director ===
- 3 lbs
- Life on Mars (2008)
- Dollhouse
- The Decoy Bride
- Glee: The 3D Concert Movie
- Pitch Perfect
- Leo Mattei - Unità Speciale
- Bad Words
- Dominion
- Scream Queens
- The Transporter Refueled
- Medici
- Me Before You
- Unforgettable
- Devils
- Helstrom
- Leonardo
- Baby Reindeer
- Dogs at the Opera
- The Turkish Passion (2024)
- Tokyo Swindlers
- Zorro (2024)
- The Eternaut
