= Satsuki Yukino =

Japanese voice actress (born 1970)

- ゆきの さつき
- Born: Yuki Inoue (井上 由起); May 25, 1970 (age 56); Kyoto, Japan
- Occupation: Voice actress
- Years active: 1992–present
- Notable work: Trigun as Milly Thompson; Love Hina as Mutsumi Otohime; Inuyasha as Kagome Higurashi; Full Metal Panic! as Kaname Chidori; Bleach as Yoruichi Shihōin; Higurashi When They Cry as Mion and Shion Sonozaki; Zone of the Enders: The 2nd Runner as Ken Marinaris
- Height: 152 cm (5 ft 0 in)

Yuki Inoue (井上 由起, Inoue Yuki; born May 25, 1970), better known by her stage name Satsuki Yukino (ゆきの さつき, Yukino Satsuki) (previously 雪乃 五月, 雪野 五月), is a Japanese voice actress. She was a member of Ken Production until 2016.

== Filmography ==
=== Anime series ===
Year	Title	Roles	Note
1995	Crayon Shin-chan	20 year old C (Ep. 173), Hagita, Gal B, wife, elementary school B, women, second cousin, Thief	
1996	Saint Tail	Sister C	
1996	Chouja Reideen	Girl	
1996	Kiko-chan Smile	Kiko-chan, Hiibaa, Sentarō	
1997–1998	Cooking Master Boy	Meili	
1997	Vampire Princess Miyu	Michiko (Ep. 7), Yamanouchi Yō (Ep. 1)	
1997	Cho Mashin Hero Wataru	Sephia	
1998	Fortune Quest L	Alicia	
1998	Trigun	Milly Thompson, Kuroneko-sama	
1998–1999	Takoyaki Mant-Man	Red	
1998–1999	Orphen	Mariabel	
1998	Generator Gawl	Masami	
1998	Super Doll Licca-chan	Hide	
1998	Bubblegum Crisis: Tokyo 2040	Sylia Stingray, Galatea (Older)	
1998	Yoshimoto Muchikko Monogatari	Shakutorimushi Brothers Tanaka	
1999	Pet Shop of Horrors	Jill	
1999	Starship Girl Yamamoto Yohko	Momiji Kagariya	
1999	Monster Rancher	Narrator, Computer Voice (ep 26)	
1999–2000	Orphen: The Revenge	Mariabel (Ep.18-19)	
1999	Excel Saga	Ropponmatsu	
1999	Chibi Maruko-chan	Rie-chan	
1999	Weekly Story Land	Junichi Morita	
1999	Gregory Horror Show	Toilet Baby, Inko	
1999–2000	Monkey Magic	Motte	
2000	Mighty Cat Masked Niyandar	Kanta Router	
2000	Love Hina	Mutsumi Otohime, Girl (Ep.2 - Shinobu's classmate)	
2000	Shin Megami Tensei: Devil Children	Hippō	
2000	Daa! Daa! Daa!	Ayumi Komada	
2000–2004	Inuyasha	Kagome Higurashi	
2001	X	Hokuto Sumeragi	
2001	Angelic Layer	Tamayo Kizaki	
2001	Captain Tsubasa: Road to 2002	Young Taro Misaki, Young Masao Tachibana	
2001	Kokoro Library	Sarara Saeki (Ep. 3)	
2001–2002	Cyborg 009 The Cyborg Soldier	Cyborg 003/Francoise Arnoul	
2001	Samurai Girl Real Bout High School	Azumi Kiribayashi	
2001	Pretear	Mayune Awayuki	
2001	Great Dangaioh	Shima Ryuuko, Romulin	
2001	Gyōten Ningen Batseelor	Show Girls	
2001	Babel II - Beyond Infinity	Reika Saeki	
2001	Hikaru no Go	Harumi Ichikawa, Ichikawa-san	
2001	Cosmowarrior Zero	Maetel	
2001	Rave Master	Cattleya Glory	
2002	Full Metal Panic!	Kaname Chidori	
2002	Tokyo Mew Mew	Kindergarten Teacher (Ep. 20)	
2002	Ai Yori Aoshi	Tina Foster	
2002	Jing: King of Bandits	Elixer (Ep. 10)	
2002	Mao-chan	Kuniko Onigawara	
2002–2003	Fortune Dogs	Tomiko	
2002	Hanada Shonen-shi	Katsura Ichimura (Ep. 6-7), Natsu (Ep. 11-12)	
2002	Getbackers	Kaoru Ujiie (eps 43-48), Police woman	
2002–2003	Duel Masters	Mai Kirifuda	
2003	Stratos 4	Betty Bozeman	
2003	Ashita no Nadja	Madeline (Ep. 6)	
2003	D.N.Angel	Freedert (Ep. 23-24)	
2003	Zatch Bell!	Yuuta Akiyama	
2003	Astro Boy	Emily (Ep. 38)	
2003	Last Exile	Madame Madosein	
2003	Tantei Gakuen Q	Sakurako Yukihira	
2003	Submarine Super 99	ZeStroge	
2003	Rumiko Takahashi Anthology	Yukari (Ep. 2), Emiri (Ep. 3), Koizumi (Ep. 7), Mrs. Kobato (Ep. 8).	
2003	Shadow Star Narutaru	Hoshimaru, Jun Ezumi (Ep. 10), Mamiko Kuri	
2003	Full Metal Panic? Fumoffu	Kaname Chidori	
2003	Planetes	Ai Tanabe	
2003	Ai Yori Aoshi ~Enishi~	Tina Foster	
2003–2004	R.O.D -The TV-	Nenene Sumiregawa	
2004	Area 88	Ryoko Tsugumo	
2004–2011	Sgt. Frog	Pururu	
2004	Madlax	Vanessa Rene	
2004	Ragnarok The Animation	Tis	
2004	Duel Masters Charge	Mai Kirifuda	
2004	Fafner	Pilot (Ep. 16)	
2004	Agatha Christie no Meitantei Poirot to Marple	Louise	
2004	Tactics	Kosome (Ep. 2)	
2004	Genshiken	Saki Kasukabe	
2005–2012	Bleach	Yoruichi Shihōin (Human Form)	
2005	Jinki: Extend	Shizuka Tsuzaki	
2005	Gallery Fake	Sayoko Mitamura, Rumi (ep 10), Girl (ep 25), Clerk (ep 29), Reporter (ep 37)	
2005	Wagamama Fairy Mirumo de Pon! Wonderful	Haruka Moroshita	
2005	The Snow Queen	Rasmus	
2005	Pani Poni Dash!	Rei Tachibana	
2005	GUNxSWORD	Yukiko Stevens	
2005	PetoPeto-san	Mrs. Asuka Yuri	
2005	Full Metal Panic! The Second Raid	Kaname Chidori	
2005–2006	Gunparade Orchestra	Michiru Katō, Newscaster (Ep. 1)	
2005	Hell Girl	Ayaka Kurenai (Ep. 7)	
2005	Kotenkotenko	Rabbi	
2005–2006	Gaiking: Legend of Daikū-maryū	Shizuka Fujiyama, Nikita	
2006	Onegai My Melody – Kuru Kuru Shuffle!	Luna Hoshika	
2006	Utawarerumono	Sopoku	
2006	Girl's High	Akari Koda	
2006	Higurashi no Naku Koro ni	Mion Sonozaki, Shion Sonozaki	
2006–2021	Gintama	Tae Shimura, Pony-chan/Yocchan (Main Ep. 156)	Series: Main (2006-2010), TV2 (2011-2012), TV3 (2012-2013), TV4 (2015-2016), Season 4 (2017-2018), TV5 (2018)
2006	.hack//Roots	Midori	
2006	Kamisama Kazoku	The female teacher	
2006	D.Gray-man	Moore (Ep. 1, 31)	
2006	009-1	Vanessa "009-3" Ibert	
2006	Pururun! Shizuku-chan	Koyuki-chan	
2006	Happy Lucky Bikkuriman	Peter Shinko	
2007–2008	Deltora Quest	Anna, Nak (Ep 33-35, 60)	
2007	Yes! Precure 5	Ai Natsuki	
2007	Hitohira	Mirei Sakaki	
2007	Robby & Kerobby	Robby	
2007	Gegege no Kitarō	Aya (Ep. 4), Anko (Ep. 50)	TV5 (2007)
2007	El Cazador de la Bruja	Nina (Ep. 26)	
2007	Claymore	Rafaela	
2007	Lovely Complex	Ootani's older sister (Ep. 13)	
2007	Zombie-Loan	Karumera (Ep. 8)	
2007	Higurashi no Naku Koro ni Kai	Mion Sonozaki, Shion Sonozaki	
2007	Blue Drop	Michiko Kōzuki	
2007–2008	Clannad	Misae Sagara	
2007	Pururun! Shizuku-chan Aha	Koyuki-chan	
2007	Hatarakids My Ham Gumi	Daisuke	
2007	Genshiken 2	Saki Kasukabe	
2007	Ayakashi	Akino Yoake	
2008–2009	Clannad After Story	Misae Sagara	
2008	Pocket Monsters: Diamond & Pearl	Hikari's Mimiroll, Zukan, Young youta, Momoan, Teacher	
2008	Mokke	Tougo	
2008	Rosario + Vampire	Tamauo Ichinose (Ep. 5, 12)	
2008	Yes! Precure 5 GoGo!	Ai Natsuki	TV5 (2008)
2008	Duel Masters Cross	Mai Kirifuda	
2008	Neo Angelique Abyss	Angelique's mother	
2008	Nabari no Ou	Yae Oda	
2008	Real Drive	Librarian (Ep. 6)	
2008	Natsume's Book of Friends	Hiiragi (Ep. 9)	
2008	Tales of the Abyss	Arietta the Wild	
2008	Negibōzu no Asatarō	Otsu	
2009	Kurokami The Animation	Yuki Kaionji	
2009	Shin Mazinger Shougeki! Z-Hen	Gamia Q	
2009	Beyblade: Metal Fusion	Hikaru's Mother	
2009	Fullmetal Alchemist: Brotherhood	Rosé Thomas	
2009	Element Hunters	Ally's Mother	
2009–2010	Battle Spirits: Shōnen Gekiha Dan	Magisa	
2009	The Sacred Blacksmith	Evadne	
2009–2010	InuYasha: The Final Act	Kagome Higurashi	
2010	Kaidan Restaurant	Keiko Soraitome	
2010	Heroman	Catherine Mae Jones (Ep. 22)	
2010	Gokujō!! Mecha Mote Iinchō Second Collection	Yoshimi Sakurai	
2010	Duel Masters Cross Shock	Mai Kirifuda	
2010–2011	Battle Spirits: Brave	Stella Korabelishchikov	
2010	And Yet the Town Moves	Shizuka Kameidō, Nurse (Ep. 12)	
2011	Gosick	Jacqueline de Signore	
2011	Suite Precure	Maria Hōjō	
2011–2013, 2019	Chihayafuru	Chieko Ayase	Main (2011-2012), TV2 (2012-2012), TV3 (2019)
2011	Naruto Shippuden	Shizuka (Ep. 235)	
2011–2012	Phi-Brain - Puzzle of God	Ana Gram	
2012	Smile Precure!	Shouko Hino	
2012	Saint Seiya Omega	Aquila Yuna, Kōga (young)	
2012	Digimon Fusion: The Boy Hunters Who Leapt Through Time	Mizuki (Ep. 19)	
2012	Hyouka	Tomoe Oreki	
2012	Phi-Brain - Puzzle of God: The Orpheus Order	Ana Gram	
2013	Hakkenden: Eight Dogs of the East	Akane Saiki (Ep. 6)	
2013	Tamako Market	Michiko Ōji, Juko	
2013	Chihayafuru 2	Chieko Ayase	
2013	The Severing Crime Edge	Queen (Ep. 8)	
2013	Pocket Monsters: The Origin	Red's mom	
2013	Free! - Iwatobi Swim Club	Miho Amakata, Young Makoto Tachibana	
2013	Monogatari Series Second Season	Gaen Izuko (Ep. 4, 19-20)	
2013	Freezing Vibration	Scarlett Ohara	
2013–2014	Phi Brain - Kami no Puzzle	Ana Gram	
2014	Strange+	Miwa	
2014	JoJo's Bizarre Adventure: Stardust Crusaders	Nena	
2014	One Piece	Koala (Ep. 541)	
2014	Free! Eternal Summer	Miho Amakata, Young Makoto Tachibana	
2015	Overlord	Brita	
2015	Sailor Moon Crystal	Kōan (Ep. 15)	
2015	Rin-ne	Tamako	
2015	Pocket Monsters XY	Mache	
2015	Owarimonogatari	Gaen Izuko	
2015	Go! Princess PreCure	Yura/Previous Generation Cure Mermaid	
2016	Pocket Monsters XY & Z	Mache	
2016	Rin-ne 2	Tamako	
2017	Boruto: Naruto Next Generations	Sumire's mother	
2017–current	Detective Conan	Momiji Ooka, Shiotani Miyuki (Ep. 166-168), Kaoru Minamisato (Ep. 364-365)	
2017	Rin-ne 3	Tamako	
2018	Katana Maidens ~ Toji No Miko	Iroha Gojō	
2018	Full Metal Panic! Invisible Victory	Kaname Chidori	
2019	Babylon	Ai Magase	
2020–2021	Higurashi: When They Cry – Gou	Mion Sonozaki, Shion Sonozaki	
2020–2022	Yashahime	Kagome Higurashi	
2021	Higurashi: When They Cry – Sotsu	Mion Sonozaki, Shion Sonozaki	
2022	Deaimon	Otsuru-san	
2022–present	Bleach: Thousand-Year Blood War	Yoruichi Shihōin	

=== Films ===
Year	Title	Roles	Note
1996	Crayon Shin-chan: Henderland no Daibōken	Employee	
1997	Crayon Shin-chan: Ankoku Tamatama Daitsuiseki	Hostage	
1998	The Doraemons: The Great Operation of Springing Insects	Girl	
2001	Inuyasha the Movie: Affections Touching Across Time	Kagome Higurashi	
2002	Inuyasha the Movie 2: The Castle Beyond the Looking Glass	Kagome Higurashi	
2003	InuYasha the Movie 3: Swords of an Honorable Ruler	Kagome Higurashi	
2003	The Golden Laws	Alisa	
2004	Inuyasha the Movie 4: Fire on the Mystic Island	Kagome Higurashi	
2007	Chibi Kero Kerobōru no Himitsu!?	Chibi Puru	
2007	Bleach: The DiamondDust Rebellion	Yoruichi Shihouin	
2008	Bleach the Movie: Fade to Black	Yoruichi Shihouin	
2009	Pokémon: Arceus and the Jewel of Life	Hikari's Mimiroru	
2009	Duel Masters: Lunatic God Saga	Mai Kirifuda	
2009	The Rebirth of Buddha	Tomoko	
2010	Trigun: Badlands Rumble	Milly Thompson	
2010	Gintama: The Movie	Shimura Tae	
2010	Welcome to THE SPACE SHOW	Shimizu Koyama	
2010	Pokémon Zoroark: Master of Illusions	Hikari's Mimiroru	
2010	Duel Masters: Honō no Kizuna XX	Mai Kififuda	
2012	BUTA	Kuppii	
2012	Detective Conan: The Eleventh Striker	Tomofumi Motoura	
2012	The Mystical Laws	Julia	
2013	Aura: Maryūinkōga Saigo no Tatakai	Ichiro's Elder Sister	
2013	Gekijōban Gintama Kanketsu-hen: Yorozuya yo Eien Nare	Shimura Tae	
2013	Majocco Shimai no Yoyo to Nene	Nao	
2014	Tamako Market	Michiko Ōji	
2015	Pocket Monsters XY	Valerie	
2016	A Silent Voice	Miyako Ishida	
2016	Crayon Shin-chan: Fast Asleep! Dreaming World Big Assault!	Yamada	
2016	One Piece Film: Gold	Koala	
2017	Crayon Shin-chan: Invasion!! Alien Shiriri	Yamada	
2017	Free! -Timeless Medley-	Miho Amakata	
2017	Detective Conan: The Crimson Love Letter	Momiji Ooka	
2018	Natsume's Book of Friends Movie	Hiiragi	
2021	Gintama: The Final	Shimura Tae	
2024	My Oni Girl	Mikuri Yatsuse	

=== OVA ===
- Virgin Fleet (1998), Satsuki Yukimizawa
- Love Hina Again (2002), Mutsumi Otohime
- Ultra Maniac (2003), Ayu Tateishi
- Hitsuji no Uta (2003), Shou Yaegashi
- Higurashi no Naku Koro ni: Gaiden Nekogoroshi-hen (2007), Mion Sonozaki
- Higurashi no Naku Koro ni Rei (2009), Mion Sonozaki, Shion Sonozaki

=== Anime CDs ===
Year	Title	Roles	Note
	Kagome Higurashi singing たったひとつの約束- Just One Promise (Tatta Hitotsu no Yakusoku)		
	Inuyasha with Kagome Higurashi in 蒼き野生を抱いて- Embrace the Untamed Wilderness (Aoki Yasei o Daite)		
	Higurashi no Naku Koro ni Kai - Meakashi-hen - "you" and "thanks"		
	Higurashi no Naku Koro ni Kai - "with 'you' -絆-"		

=== Video games ===
1996

- Kidou Senshi Gundam: The Blue Destiny, Marion Welch (EXAM System)
- Heroine Dream, Koyomi Tokimori

1998

- Exodus Guilty, Will
- Sound Novel Machi, Shiori Aso

1999

- Kagayaku Kisetsu e, Misaki Kawana
- Seisyoujokantai Virgin Fleet, Satsuku Yukimisawa
- Maboroshi Tsukiyo, Tamako Amano
- SpikeOut: Final Edition, Linda
- Revive... Sosei, Nozomiharu Ogawa
- Langrisser Millennium, Rumati Murph

2000

- Gensou no Artemis: Actress School Mystery Adventure, Aoi Sasamoto
- Karan Koron Gakuen: Doki Doki Hen, Tsukasa Yuuki
- Natsuiro Kenjutsu Komachi, Sagiri Sendo
- Aitakute...Your Smiles in My Heart, Michiru Watase
- Karan Koron Gakuen: Munekyun Hen, Izumi Saki
- Karan Koron Gakuen: Byuarabu Hen, Haruka Hojo
- Love Hina: Ai wa Kotoba no Chuu ni, Mutsumi Otohime
- Love Hina: Totsuzen no Engeji Happening, Mutsumi Otohime
- Love Hina 2: Kotoba wa Konayuki no You ni, Mutsumi Otohime

2001

- 21: TwoOne, Yuina Tachibana
- Canary ~Kono Omoi o Uta ni Nosete~, Megumi Chigasaki
- Inuyasha — Kagome Higurashi

2002

- Groove Adventure Rave: Mikan no Hiseki, Cattleya Glory
- Tales of Destiny 2, Limuru, Young Loni
- Inuyasha: Sengoku Otogi Kassen, Kagome Higurashi
- Hikaru no Go: Insei Choujou Kessen, Harumi Ichikawa
- Unlimited Saga, Girl in silver, Jean Moore

2003

- Zone of the Enders: The 2nd Runner, Ken Marinerisu
- Arc the Lad: Twilight of the Spirits, Paulette Van Lloyd
- Ai Yori Aoshi, Tina Foster
- Love Hina Gorgeous: Chiratto Happening!!, Mutsumi Otohime

2004

- Inuyasha: Juso no Kamen, Kagome Higurashi
- Crimson Tears, Asuka
- Tenchu: Fatal Shadows, Rin
- Futakoi, Miyabi Hinagiku

2005

- Invisible Sign -Isu-, Rin Kimura, Young Makoto Miyake
- Romancing SaGa, Farah, Diana
- Fushigi Yuugi Genbu Kaiden Gaiden -Kagami no Miko-, Takiko Okuda
- Futakoi: Koi to Mizugi no Survival, Miyabi Hinagiku
- Lucky Star: Moe Drill, Patricia Martin
- Tales of the Abyss, Arietta

2006

- Clannad, Misae Sagara
- Mystereet, Aki Fujimichi, Marta Arugerichi
- Blue Blaster, Elsa Lothringen
- Wrestle Angels Survivor, Mimi Yoshiwara, Miyuki Sanada
- Blood+: One Night Kiss, Sayumi Isojima
- High School Girls Game's-High!!, Akari Kōda
- Utawarerumono: Chiriyukusha e no Komoriuta, Soboku

2007

- Zero no Tsukaima: Shou-akuma to Harukaze no Concerto, Haruna Konagi, Akina
- Higurashi no Naku Koro ni Matsuri, Mion Sonozaki, Shion Sonozaki
- Shin Lucky Star Moe Drill: Tabidachi, Patrica Martin
- Hot Shots Golf: Out of Bounds, Lina

2008

- The Legend of Heroes: Trails in the Sky the 3rd, Erica Russell
- Wrestle Angels Survivor 2, Mimi Yoshiwara, Miyuki Sanada

2009

- Chou Gekijouban Keroro Gunsou: Gekishin Dragon Warriors de Arimasu!, Pururukankocho
- Utawarerumono, Sopoku

2010

- Fullmetal Alchemist - Yakusoku no Hi e, Rose
- Another Century's Episode: R, Kaname Chidori

2012

- Zone of the Enders HD Collection, Ken Marinellis
- Saint Seiya Omega: Ultimate Cosmo, Yuna Aquila

2014

- Super Heroine Chronicle, Mion Sonozaki, Shion Sonozaki

2017

- Super Robot Wars V, Kaname Chidori

2018

- Tokyo Afterschool Summoners, Suzuka

2019

- Ace Combat 7: Skies Unknown, Avril Mead

2020

- The Legend of Heroes: Trails into Reverie, Erika Russell

2021

- Jump Force, Yoruichi Shihōin (DLC)
- Girls' Frontline, FX-05 and VP1915
- Arknights, Justice Knight

2023

- Mahjong Soul, Kurone Toujou
- Granblue Fantasy, Kaguya

=== Drama CDs ===
- 7 Seeds (2003), Hana Suguruno
- Cyborg 009 Drama CD: Love Stories, Francoise Arnoul
- Hayate Cross Blade, Ayana Mudou
- Inuyasha Jigoku de Matteita Shichinintai, Kagome Higurashi
- Fushigi Yūgi Genbu Kaiden series, Takiko Okuda
