= Alaina Burnett =

Canadian voice actress

- Born: Alaina Kathleen Burnett; December 6, 1977 (age 48); Vancouver, British Columbia, Canada
- Occupation: Voice Actress
- Notable credits: SSX 3 as Elise Riggs; Mobile Suit Gundam as Sayla Mass; Inuyasha the Movie: Swords of an Honorable Ruler as Izayoi

Alaina Burnett (born December 6, 1977) is a Canadian voice actress from Vancouver, British Columbia, Canada.

== Roles ==
- Earth Girl Arjuna – Kaine Ariyoshi
- Infinite Ryvius – Ran Luckmolde
- Inuyasha – Izayoi, Mu-on'na (Unmother)
- Inuyasha the Movie: Swords of an Honorable Ruler – Izayoi
- Mobile Suit Gundam – Sayla Mass
- Mobile Suit Gundam: Char's Counterattack – Cheimin Noah
- Zoids: New Century – Pierce
- Master Keaton – Akemi
