= Toshihiko Nakajima =

Japanese actor

Toshihiko Nakajima (中嶋 聡彦, Nakajima Toshihiko; August 12, 1962 – September 8, 2017) was a Japanese actor and voice actor from Nagoya, Aichi Prefecture who was affiliated with Gekidan 21 Seiki Fox at the time of his death. He was previously affiliated with Ken Production.

== Filmography ==
=== Anime ===
- Carlos in Cowboy Bebop
- Lemint in Fushigiboshi no Futagohime
- Kojiro Murdoch & Tad Elsman in Gundam Seed
- Hachiemon, Rikichi in Inuyasha
- Clyde in Outlaw Star
- Masami Hirukawa in Paranoia Agent
- Montand in Princess Tutu
- Da Ruma in Tenchi Muyo! GXP
- Landbullet in Transformers: Galaxy Force
- Chief Nagase in ToHeart Remember my Memories
- Yagi-chan in Hajime no Ippo
- Tome-san in Detective Conan
- Farmer Brown and the Yamato no Orochi in Ranma ½
- Doctor (ep5) in Rumiko Takahashi Anthology
- Customer 1, Kohran's Father, Man, Operator A, Police Officer B & Supervisor in Sakura Wars
- Movie Orator in Sakura Wars OVA
- Wise Men Staff in Sakura Wars: The Movie

=== Films ===
- Hachiemon in Inuyasha the Movie: Affections Touching Across Time
- Hachiemon in Inuyasha the Movie: The Castle Beyond the Looking Glass
- Wanton in Ranma ½: Battle at Togenkyo! Get Back the Brides

=== Dubbing ===
- Captain America (Lieutenant Colonel Louis (Michael Nouri))

== Sound director ==
- Blade
- Chaos Head
- Infinite Stratos
- Kanokon
- Kobato.
- RideBack
- Sands of Destruction
