= Richard Ian Cox =

Canadian actor

- Born: St Asaph, Wales
- Other name: Richard Cox
- Citizenship: United Kingdom; Canada
- Occupations: Actor; comedian; radio host
- Years active: 1989–present
- Spouse: Becky Cox (m. 2006)

Richard Ian Cox is a Welsh-born Canadian actor. He is best known for his voice work for English-language dubs of anime, mainly for Inuyasha. Cox gained prominence for playing the character of Henry Dailey's (played by Mickey Rooney) teenaged traveller and horse rider, Alec Ramsay, in The Family Channel's Adventures of the Black Stallion during the early 1990s. Cox also gained fame for voicing Ian Kelley, the title character in the animated series Being Ian and for voicing Scattershot, one of the Autobots in the CGI-Animated series Transformers: Cybertron. In 2015, he provided the voice of Lofty in the American-dubbed version of the 2015 reboot of the British children's animated television series Bob the Builder taking over from both Sonya Leite, Emma Tate and Lizzie Waterworth. He had a prominent live-action role alongside Robin Williams in the 2006 comedy RV. He hosts his own podcast called The Show.

== Career ==
Born in St. Asaph, Wales, Cox began acting at the age of 9. He moved to Vancouver, Canada and at age 14 became a professional actor. After graduating from Vancouver's Richmond Secondary School in 1991, he appeared in a wide variety of guest-starring roles. He is most commonly known for his voice work of Bit Cloud in Zoids: New Century Zero, Ranma Saotome (male) in the later seasons of Ranma ½, and as the title character of InuYasha, which are both series based on the original manga works of Rumiko Takahashi.

By the time he was 16, he won the co-starring role in Black Stallion, opposite Mickey Rooney, where he worked for much of his youth. The two remained close friends, until Rooney's death, in April 2014. He has also voiced various characters in several other anime series, including Mobile Suit Gundam (Kai Shiden), Galaxy Angel (Normad), Megaman NT Warrior (Burner Man) and Gundam SEED (Tolle Koenig and Shani Andras), as well as various American cartoon characters, such as Quicksilver in X-Men: Evolution and Snails in My Little Pony: Friendship Is Magic.

Based in Vancouver, Cox has made a few guest appearances in Stargate SG-1 and its spin-off Stargate Atlantis, as well as bit parts in series such as ER and Psych. He has also appeared on the Canadian television show The Outer Limits and voices Bedtime Bear in Care Bears: Adventures in Care-a-Lot.

For over a decade, Cox was a senior instructor of actors at Tarlington Training in Vancouver, and currently teaches film acting at South Delta Secondary School.

He hosts The Show, an online radio show.

== Roles ==
=== Voice-over roles ===
- .hack//Roots (2006) – Itta (English version)
- Action Man (1995–1996) – Jacques
- Asterix: The Mansions of the Gods (2014) - Squaronthehypotenus (English version)
- Battle Assault 3 Featuring Gundam SEED (2004) (uncredited)
- Barbie and the Secret Door (2014) – Whiff
- Being Ian (2005–2008) – Ian Kelley, Kid #1, Fan #8, Golfer, Ian's Louse, Headbanger, Police Chief, Green-Capped Sailor
- Bob the Builder (2015–2017) – Lofty (US)
- Bob the Builder: Mega Machines (2017) – Lofty (US)
- Boys Over Flowers (1996) - Red-haired Thug (English version, ep. 32)
- Care Bears: Adventures In Care-A-Lot (2007–2008) – Bedtime Bear
- Dragalia Lost (2018) – Ranzal, Rex, Yaten
- Dinotrux (2015) – Revvit, additional voices
- Dragon Drive (2004) – Kouhei Toki (voice)
- Dragon Tales (1999) – Mefirst Wizard (Red Hat)
- Dynasty Warriors: Gundam (2007) – Kai Shiden (English version)
- Dynasty Warriors: Gundam 2 (2008) – Kai Shiden (English version)
- Dynasty Warriors: Gundam 3 (2010) – Allelujah Haptism, Kai Shiden (English version)
- Fat Dog Mendoza (1998) – Additional Voices
- Firehouse Tales (2005) – Crabby
- Galaxy Angel (2004) – Normad
- Geronimo Stilton (2009) – Trap Stilton
- Green Legend Ran (1992) (voice: English version)
- Hamtaro – Kip, Sabu
- Hurricanes (1993) – Additional Voices
- Infinite Ryvius (1999) – Gran McDaniel and additional characters (English version)
- InuYasha: Feudal Combat (2005) – Inuyasha (English version)
- InuYasha the Movie: Affections Touching Across Time (2004) – InuYasha (English version)
- InuYasha the Movie: The Castle Beyond the Looking Glass (2004) – Inuyasha (English version)
- InuYasha the Movie: Fire on the Mystic Island (2006) – InuYasha (English version)
- InuYasha the Movie: Swords of an Honorable Ruler (2005) – InuYasha (English version)
- InuYasha: The Final Act (2012–13) – Inuyasha (English version)
- InuYasha: The Secret of the Cursed Mask (2004) InuYasha (English version)
- InuYasha (2002–2006) – InuYasha, Young InuYasha, Buyo the Cat (English version) (seasons 1–5 as Richard Cox then Season 6+ as Richard Ian Cox)
- LeapFrog – Additional voices
- Logical Journey of the Zoombinis (1996) – Narrator
- Max Steel (2013) – Kirby Kowalski
- MegaMan: NT Warrior (2002–2003) – NoodleMan.EXE, BurnerMan.EXE (English version)
- Mobile Suit Gundam 00 (2008) – Allelujah Haptism (English version)
- Mobile Suit Gundam SEED (2002) – Tolle Koenig, Shani Andras (English version)
- Mobile Suit Gundam: Encounters in Space (2003) – Kai Shiden (English version)
- Mobile Suit Gundam: Federation vs. Zeon (2001) – Kai Shiden (English version)
- Mobile Suit Gundam: Zeonic Front (2001) – Kai Shiden (English version)
- Mobile Suit Gundam (1979) – Kai Shiden
- Monkey Magic (1998) (English version)
- Monster Rancher (2000) – Niton, Tainted Cat Brother #2
- My Little Pony: Friendship Is Magic (2010–2019) – Snails, Dumb-Bell, Clump, Grampa Gruff, Featherweight
- My Little Pony: Equestria Girls (2013) – Snails
- My Little Pony: Equestria Girls - Rainbow Rocks (2014) – Snails
- My Little Pony: Equestria Girls – Legend of Everfree (2016) – Snails
- My Little Pony: Pony Life (2020–2021) – Snails
- My Little Pony Tales (1992) – Coach, Referee, Photographer Pony, Mr. Sweetheart, Mr. Berrytown, Postman, Mr. Clover, Dustman, Fisherman, Rollerskate Contest Judge, Mr. Bon Bon, Mr. Tidwell, Wedding Guests 1, 2 and 3, Vicar, Cake Shop Owner, Cheval, Chief, Mr. Kidoo, Mayor of Ponyland, Director, Vet, Spot, Mr. Patch, King of the Isle of Pony, Usher, Yorkie, Farm Judge, Mr. Meadowsweet, Fairground Stall Holder
- Nana – Ginpei
- Powerpuff Girls Z (2006) – Top Hat, Big Balled Billy (Big Boy), Noodlehead
- Ranma ½ (1989) – Ranma Saotome (male) (English version) (seasons 4–7)
- RoboCop: Alpha Commando (1998) – Additional Voices
- Shelldon – Herman
- Silverwing (2003) – Orestes
- Spy Kids: Mission Critical (2018) – Sir Awesome
- Supernoobs (2015) – Kevin Reynolds
- The Little Prince – as Eenymeeny (May 27, 2012 dubbing episodes 24–25, The Planet of Carapodes arc)
- Tom and Jerry Tales (2006) - Sheldon
- Transformers: Cybertron (2005) – Scattorshot (voice)
- Trouble Chocolate (2000) – Cacao
- Warhammer 40,000: Dawn of War (2004) – Heretics, Cultists, Bonesingers, Guardians, Rangers, Dark Reapers, Warp Spiders, Falcon Grav Tanks, Vypers, Fire Prisms, Wraithlords and Avatars of Khaine
- Will & Dewitt (2007–2008) – Dewitt
- X-Men: Evolution (2000) – Quicksilver
- Yashahime: Princess Half-Demon (2020–22) – InuYasha (English version)
- Zoids: New Century Zero (2001) – Bit Cloud (English version)
- Zoids Wild (2018) - Master Bug (English Version)

=== Live-action roles ===
- The Adventures of the Black Stallion (1990) – Alec Ramsay
- Alive: The Miracle of the Andes (1993) - Moncho Sabella
- Blood Angels (2004) – Rennie
- Breaker High (1997) – Tony
- The Christmas Clause (2008) – Morris
- Cold Squad (1999–2000)
- Eureka (2007) - Dr. Bob Stone (as Richard Cox)
- Ghost Rider (2007) – Helicopter Pilot (as Richard Cox)
- H-E Double Hockey Sticks (1999)
- The Mrs. Clause (2008) – Morris
- My 5 Wives (2000) (as Richard Cox)
- The New Addams Family (1990s) – Smedley
- Postal (2007) – Coffee Customer
- Pants on Fire (2013)
- Project Mc^{2} (2017) – Professor Kato
- Psych (2006) – Desk Clerk Bobby
- Recipe for Love (2014) – Kitchen Knockout Judge #1
- Runaway Virus (2000)
- RV (2006) – Laird
- Snowbound: The Jim and Jennifer Stolpa Story (1994) – Jason Wicker
- Stargate Atlantis (2005) – Dr. Brendan Gall
- Stargate SG-1 (2000) – Nyan
- The Stickup (2001)
