= Inuyasha the Movie: Swords of an Honorable Ruler =

2003 film by Toshiya Shinohara

- North American DVD cover art
- Kanji: 映画犬夜叉 天下覇道の剣
- Literal meaning: InuYasha the Movie: Swords of Supreme Conquest
- Revised Hepburn: Eiga Inuyasha: Tenka Hadō no Ken
- Directed by: Toshiya Shinohara
- Screenplay by: Katsuyuki Sumisawa
- Based on: Inuyasha by Rumiko Takahashi
- Produced by: Michihiko Suwa; Masuo Ueda; Mikihiro Iwata
- Starring: Kappei Yamaguchi; Satsuki Yukino; Ken Narita; Kōji Tsujitani; Houko Kuwashima; Kumiko Watanabe; Kenichi Ogata; Jōji Yanami; Kikuko Inoue
- Cinematography: Hirofumi Yagi; Yūdai Takahashi
- Edited by: Shigeyuki Yamamori
- Music by: Kaoru Wada
- Production company: Sunrise
- Distributed by: Toho (International); Lionsgate (United Kingdom)
- Release date: December 20, 2003
- Running time: 98 minutes
- Country: Japan
- Language: Japanese
- Budget: US$3.6 million
- Box office: $6,654,841

Inuyasha the Movie: Swords of an Honorable Ruler (Note: Also known as InuYasha the Movie: Swords of Supreme Conquest (Japanese: 映画犬夜叉 天下覇道の剣, Hepburn: Eiga Inuyasha: Tenka Hadō no Ken)) is a 2003 Japanese animated fantasy adventure film based on the Inuyasha manga series written and illustrated by Rumiko Takahashi. The film is directed by Toshiya Shinohara, written by Katsuyuki Sumisawa, and produced by Sunrise. It was released in Japan on December 20, 2003.

In the film, Inuyasha and Sesshomaru forcefully work together to seal So'unga, their father's third sword, when it is awakened from its sheath.

Swords of an Honorable Ruler is the third film of the Inuyasha series, following The Castle Beyond the Looking Glass and followed up by Fire on the Mystic Island.

== Plot ==
Two centuries ago, the great dog-demon Tōga denies his elder son Sesshomaru's request for ownership of two of his swords, Tessaiga and So'unga. Afterwards, Tōga goes to a mansion guarded by an army of samurai where his human wife, Lady Izayoi, is giving birth. The army's leader, Takemaru of Setsuna, who is in love with Izayoi, attempts to kill her by stabbing her and setting the mansion ablaze. Tōga defeats the army, wounds Takemaru and enters the mansion, where he uses his third sword, Tenseiga, to revive Izayoi. Tōga allows her to flee the burning mansion with their newborn, whom he names Inuyasha, then fights Takemaru. At a safe distance, Izayoi witness the mansion collapses on both men and Toga's spirit wishes her to live a long life with Inuyasha.

In the present day, Inuyasha travels through the Bone-Eater's Well from the Feudal era to visit Kagome Higurashi in the modern era. Unbeknownst to them, Kagome's family uncovers an ancient sword as part of their shrine's treasures, which turns out to be So'unga. The spirit of So'unga's sheath, Saya, emerges before the sword finds its way to Inuyasha and Kagome. Saya tells Inuyasha that he must master the sword before it can destroy the modern world, but once he holds it, it possesses his arm and reverts him to his demon form, forcing him to return to the Feudal era.

Inuyasha and Kagome's friends, monk Miroku, demon slayer Sango, fox demon Shippo, and Sango's nekomata companion Kirara attempt to stop him, only to escape once Inuyasha uses the sword's deadly Dragon Twister attack. Kagome takes Saya with her to the Feudal era and reunites with everyone including Inuyasha's mentor Myoga, who knows Saya. They are eventually accompanied by blacksmith Totosai, the creator of Tōga's swords.

The possessed Inuyasha runs into his older brother, Sesshomaru, who battles Inuyasha for having taken up So'unga. So'unga orders Inuyasha to attack Sesshomaru's company, Jaken and Rin, until Kagome intervenes and uses the Beads of Subjugation necklace command on Inuyasha to release him from So'unga's possession. After So'unga flies off to find a new host, Sesshomaru leaves Jaken and Rin behind, while Inuyasha leaves an unconscious Kagome with them, vowing to destroy So'unga himself.

After Kagome awakens and is joined by her friends, Totosai reveals that So'unga is possessed by an ancient evil demon, following its sealing since there were no instructions given by Tōga as to what to do with it following his death. Meanwhile, So'unga retrieves Sesshomaru's severed arm from the past and revives Takemaru, who, equipped with the sword and a new body, vows revenge on Tōga by killing his sons. Takemaru takes over a nearby castle and slays its army, resurrecting the approximately two-thousand soldiers as an army of the undead, as well as opening a portal to the netherworld.

Kagome and the rest of the group, including Jaken and Rin, join Inuyasha and Sesshomaru in a battle against Takemaru's army. After inflicting heavy casualties on the soldiers, Miroku uses his Wind Tunnel to eliminate the rest, risking his life in the process. According to Totosai, the only way to defeat Takemaru and So'unga is to combine the forces of Tessaiga's Backlash Wave and the Dragon Strike of Sesshomaru's Tōkijin; Inuyasha initially refuses, noting that he and Sesshomaru could never fight side-by-side.

Inuyasha kills Takemaru, forcing So'unga to form a physical body of its own. Inuyasha and Sesshomaru continuously fail to destroy Takemaru individually; the brothers eventually give in and use the powers of their swords to destroy So'unga's body and send the sword into the netherworld. Tōga's spirit appears, remarking that he is proud of his sons, before the portal to the netherworld closes. Sesshomaru departs with Jaken and Rin, while Inuyasha and his allies watch over the surrounding environment reverting to normal.

== Voice cast ==
Character	Japanese Voice Actor	English Voice Actor
Inuyasha	Kappei Yamaguchi	Richard Ian Cox
Kagome Higurashi	Satsuki Yukino	Moneca Stori
Miroku	Kōji Tsujitani	Kirby Morrow
Sango	Houko Kuwashima	Kelly Sheridan
Shippō	Kumiko Watanabe	Jillian Michaels
Sesshōmaru	Ken Narita	David Kaye
Dog General	Akio Otsuka	Don Brown
Izayoi	Kikuko Inoue	Alaina Burnett
Takemaru of Setsuna	Yasunori Matsumoto	Jonathan Holmes
Sō'unga	Fumihiko Tachiki	Ward Perry
Saya	Kaneta Kimotsuki	Michael Dobson
Myōga	Kenichi Ogata	Paul Dobson
Tōtōsai	Jōji Yanami	Richard Newman
Jaken	Yuichi Nagashima	Don Brown
Rin	Mamiko Noto	Brenna O'Brien
Grandpa	Katsumi Suzuki	French Tickner
Mrs. Higurashi	Asako Dodo	Cathy Weseluck
Sōta Higurashi	Akiko Nakagawa	Rebecca Shoichet
Eri	Yuki Masuda	Rebecca Shoichet
Yuka	Kaori Shimizu	Jillian Michaels
Ayumi	Nami Okamoto	Cathy Weseluck

== Production ==
The film was produced by Sunrise and shared several principal staff members with the previous two films. Toshiya Shinohara returned as director, Katsuyuki Sumisawa wrote the screenplay, and Kaoru Wada composed the music. Hideyuki Motohashi and Yoshihito Hishinuma were credited as character designers.

A two-volume film-comic adaptation was published in Japan by Shogakukan under its Shōnen Sunday Comics Visual Selection imprint in July and August 2004.

The film's theme song, "Four Seasons", was performed by Namie Amuro. The original soundtrack, composed by Kaoru Wada, was released by Avex Mode on December 17, 2003, three days before the film's Japanese theatrical premiere. The album contains 35 tracks, with a total running time of 57 minutes and 41 seconds.

== Release ==
Swords of an Honorable Ruler was released theatrically in Japan by Toho on December 20, 2003. It debuted at number three at the Japanese box office, behind Finding Nemo and The Last Samurai. The film fell to number four during its second weekend, remained at number four in its third weekend, and ranked sixth in its fourth weekend.

=== Home media ===
In Japan, the film was released on DVD on August 27, 2004, by Shogakukan, with distribution by Toho. The edition included promotional footage, theatrical trailers, production artwork and a bonus audio drama CD. Initial copies also included an illustrated card drawn by Rumiko Takahashi.

In North America, Viz Media released the film on DVD on September 6, 2005, with a suggested retail price of $24.98. The first 100,000 copies included an exclusive limited-edition trading card from Score Entertainment's Inuyasha trading card game, while Viz supported the release with a national television advertising campaign. Ahead of the DVD release, Viz and Revolution Marketing organized a promotional tour using a 92-seat mobile movie theater, which screened the film at Walmart locations in 15 U.S. cities. On March 26, 2013, Viz Media released all four Inuyasha films together on Blu-ray in North America as Inuyasha the Movie: The Complete Collection.

In Italy, the film was released on DVD by Dynit in 2005 under the title Inuyasha the Movie – La spada del dominatore del mondo. On May 19, 2010, Dynit included the film in a five-disc DVD collection alongside the other three Inuyasha films. A two-disc Blu-ray collection containing all four films followed in September 2017.

In Germany, the film was released on DVD by Red Planet on May 29, 2006, featuring German and Japanese audio tracks. The film was subsequently included in a four-film DVD collection released by Alive on November 2, 2007.

In Spain, Selecta Visión released the film on rental DVD on September 19, 2007, under the title InuYasha: La espada conquistadora, featuring Spanish and Japanese audio tracks. A retail DVD edition followed in September 2009. On March 30, 2026, Selecta Visión included the film in DVD and Blu-ray collections containing all four theatrical films, featuring Japanese, Spanish and Catalan audio tracks.

In Australia, Madman Entertainment released the film on DVD on November 8, 2006, featuring English and Japanese audio tracks. In 2013, Madman included the film in a four-film DVD collection alongside the other three Inuyasha films.

== Reception ==
Joe Luscik of Animefringe rated the film 3.5 out of 5 and praised its exploration of the history of Inuyasha, Sesshomaru and their family, considering the expanded backstory a distinguishing feature compared with the previous films. He also praised the action sequences, while criticizing several moments as corny and finding the ending less satisfying.

Reviewing the four-film collection for DVD Talk, Todd Douglass Jr. considered Swords of an Honorable Ruler an improvement over The Castle Beyond the Looking Glass, praising its action and story while criticizing its pacing. He regarded the first and third films as the strongest entries in the series.

== Legacy ==
Elements introduced in Swords of an Honorable Ruler were later carried into the Yashahime: Princess Half-Demon franchise. The film was the first Inuyasha work to depict Inuyasha and Sesshomaru's father in his humanoid form and to show the circumstances surrounding Inuyasha's birth and his father's death. In 2025, Yashahime manga artist Takashi Shiina specifically noted that the humanoid appearance of the Dog General used in his adaptation had originated in Swords of an Honorable Ruler.
