= Toshiya Shinohara =

Japanese film director (born 1959)

Toshiya Shinohara (篠原 俊哉, Shinohara Toshiya; born October 20, 1959) is a Japanese film director.

== Filmography ==
- Inuyasha the Movie: Affections Touching Across Time (2001): Director, Continuity
- Inuyasha the Movie: Fire on the Mystic Island (2004): Director, Storyboard
- Nagi-Asu: A Lull in the Sea (2013–14): Director
- Dive in Wonderland (2025): Director

Unknown date

- 2001 Nights (anime): Assistant Director
- Amagami SS (????): Storyboard (episode 20)
- Anohana: The Flower We Saw That Day (????): Storyboard (episodes 2, 10), Episode Director (ep 10)
- Another (anime): Storyboard (episode 8), Episode Director (episode 8)
- Banner of the Stars: Storyboard (episode 3)
- Basilisk (????): Storyboard (episodes 12, 17)
- Black Butler: Director, Storyboard (OP, ED), Episode Director (OP, ED)
- Black Rock Shooter: Storyboard (episode 3), Episode Director (episode 3)
- Crest of the Stars: Storyboard (episodes 2, 6, 10), Unit Director (episodes 2, 6, 10)
- EX-Driver: Storyboard (episodes 4–6), Dramatization
- Fushigi Yugi: Episode Director (episode 10)
- Gamba to Kawauso no Boken (film): Assistant Director
- Gintama': Storyboard (episode 46)
- Gunparade Orchestra (TV): Director
- Gurren Lagann: Episode Director (episode 18)
- Hanasaku Iroha: Storyboard (5 episodes), Episode Director (episodes 11, 18, 24)
- Harukanaru Toki no Naka de 3 (video game): Director
- Higurashi no Naku Koro ni (????): Storyboard
- Hitohira (????): Episode Director (episode 9)
- Inuyasha the Movie: The Castle Beyond the Looking Glass: Director, Continuity, Production Director
- Inuyasha the Movie: Swords of an Honorable Ruler: Director, Storyboard, Sequence Director
- Iroduku: The World in Colors: Director
- Kids on the Slope: Storyboard (episode 4)
- Kishin Taisen Gigantic Formula: Storyboard (episodes 20, 24)
- Last Exile: Fam, the Silver Wing: Episode Director (episode 9)
- Legend of the Galactic Heroes: Storyboard
- Level E: Storyboard (episode 11), Episode Director (episode 11)
- Lupin III: Bye Bye Liberty Crisis (special): Assistant Director
- Lupin III: Crisis in Tokyo (special): Director, Storyboard
- Lupin III: Dead or Alive (film): Storyboard, Co-Director
- Lupin III: Hemingway Papers (special): Assistant Director
- Lupin III: The Legend of the Gold of Babylon (film): Production Advancement
- Magic Knight Rayearth 2: Storyboard (episode 32)
- Natsume's Book of Friends: Storyboard (episode 1)
- Oniisama E...: Episode Director (episode 10)
- RDG Red Data Girl: Director
- Samurai Deeper Kyo: Episode Director (episode 1)
- Soreike! Anpanman: Yuuki no Hana ga Hiraku toki (film): Director, Storyboard
- The Aquatope on White Sand: Director
- The Book of Bantorra: Director, Storyboard (5 episodes), Episode Director (episode 27)
- The Boy Who Saw the Wind (film): Animation Director
- The Diary of Anne Frank (film): Assistant Director
