= Inuyasha the Movie: Affections Touching Across Time =

2001 film by Toshiya Shinohara

- Japanese theatrical release poster
- Kana: 映画犬夜叉 時代を越える想い
- Literal meaning: InuYasha the Movie: The Love that Transcends Time
- Revised Hepburn: Eiga Inuyasha: Toki o Koeru Omoi
- Directed by: Toshiya Shinohara
- Screenplay by: Katsuyuki Sumisawa
- Based on: Inuyasha by Rumiko Takahashi
- Produced by: Michihiko Suwa; Masuo Ueda; Mikihiro Iwata
- Starring: Kappei Yamaguchi; Satsuki Yukino; Kumiko Watanabe; Kōji Tsujitani; Houko Kuwashima; Noriko Hidaka; Ken Narita; Kenichi Ogata; Hisako Kyōda
- Cinematography: Hisao Shirai
- Edited by: Tomoaki Tsurubuchi
- Music by: Kaoru Wada
- Production company: Sunrise
- Distributed by: Toho
- Release date: December 15, 2001
- Running time: 100 minutes
- Country: Japan
- Language: Japanese
- Budget: US$2.9 million
- Box office: $10,539,779

Inuyasha the Movie: Affections Touching Across Time (Note: Also known as InuYasha the Movie: The Love that Transcends Time (Japanese: 映画犬夜叉 時代を越える想い, Hepburn: Eiga Inuyasha: Toki o Koeru Omoi)) is a 2001 Japanese animated fantasy adventure film based on the Inuyasha manga series written and illustrated by Rumiko Takahashi. The film is directed by Toshiya Shinohara, written by Katsuyuki Sumisawa, and produced by Sunrise. It was released in Japan on December 22, 2001.

The film follows Inuyasha and his friends, confronting a demonic moth warrior named Menomaru, who was resurrected by one of the shards of the Shikon Jewel.

Affections Touching Across Time is the first film of the Inuyasha series, which is followed up by The Castle Beyond the Looking Glass.

== Plot ==
Half-demon Inuyasha's late demon father Toga defeated a powerful Chinese moth yōkai, Hyōga, two centuries ago, but a Shikon Jewel fragment has freed his son, Menōmaru, who seeks to avenge his father's death and free the tremendously infinite power and strength of his father sealed away with him.

In the present of Feudal-era Japan, Inuyasha and his friends, Kagome, monk Miroku, demon slayer Sango and fox demon Shippo, defeat a scorpion demon. Miroku and Sango split up from the group after Sango's faithful nekomata companion Kirara mysteriously runs off, leading them to Menōmaru's cave. Menōmaru and his female minions, Ruri and Hari, face off against Miroku and Sango. Ruri copies Miroku's Wind Tunnel, and Hari curses Kirara to follow Hari as her leader. Menōmaru mind-controls Kagome to turn against Inuyasha.

After the heroes are pushed away by a blast from Menōmaru and split up, Menōmaru succeeds in accessing the demonic power of his predecessors, sealed away by Inuyasha's father. He becomes a new, more powerful Hyōga, and begins to change the essence of time and space by absorbing the souls of countless people to fully merge himself with his family's demonic energy.

Menōmaru's mind-control curse on Kagome possesses her, and she is forced to pursue and kill Inuyasha, who recognizes her wearing the same style of clothing as Kikyo, his former lover. After realizing what Menōmaru did to her and choosing to face the controlled Kagome at the Sacred Tree, she shoots him with a sacred arrow. Kagome regains control of herself in anguish over Inuyasha, during which Kikyo appears and forces Kagome to return to her own time.

Back in the present, Kagome finds her family shrine and the rest of Tokyo covered in snow caused by Menōmaru's curse. She goes to the tree that Inuyasha was sealed to, realizing that without a way back to Feudal Japan, that she can never see him again. She places her hand on the tree and discovers that she and Inuyasha are emotionally connected to each other through the tree and can talk to each other through thoughts. After Inuyasha pleads with her to return to the Feudal era, Kagome retrieves a piece of Kikyo's sacred arrow from the tree and shoots it into the well. She returns to the Feudal era to find Inuyasha reawakened, thanks to Shippo, Myoga and Kaede.

Deciding to face off Menōmaru and his minions alone, Miroku defeats Ruri in a duel with their wind tunnels, and Sango brings Kirara back to her senses, allowing them to defeat Hari. They join Inuyasha, Kagome and Shippo in a last stand against Menōmaru. Inuyasha combines the Backlash Wave with Kagome's sacred arrow to kill Hyōga.

== Voice cast ==
Character	Japanese Voice Actor	English Voice Actor
Inuyasha	Kappei Yamaguchi	Richard Ian Cox
Kagome Higurashi	Satsuki Yukino	Moneca Stori
Miroku	Kōji Tsujitani	Kirby Morrow
Sango	Houko Kuwashima	Kelly Sheridan
Shippō	Kumiko Watanabe	Jillian Michaels
Myōga	Kenichi Ogata	Paul Dobson
Kikyō	Noriko Hidaka	Willow Johnson
Kaede	Hisako Kyōda	Pam Hyatt
Hachiemon	Toshihiko Nakajima	Terry Klassen
Grandpa	Katsumi Suzuki	French Tickner
Sōta Higurashi	Akiko Nakagawa	Saffron Henderson
Mrs. Higurashi	Asako Dodo	Cathy Weseluck
Sesshōmaru	Ken Narita	David Kaye
Jaken	Yuichi Nagashima	Don Brown
Rin	Mamiko Noto	Brenna O'Brien
Menōmaru	Tomokazu Seki	Vincent Gale
Ruri	Hekiru Shiina	Venus Terzo
Hari	Tomoko Kawakami	Lalainia Lindbjerg

== Production ==
Plans for a theatrical adaptation of Inuyasha were considered alongside the development of the television anime. According to producer Masuo Ueda, the film's development and release schedule depended partly on the television series' initial audience ratings. Following its October 2000 premiere, which reportedly attracted ratings of 17.9% in the Kantō region and 19.8% in Kansai, the producers advanced the film project and began approaching film distributors by November 2000.

The film was directed by Toshiya Shinohara, with a screenplay by Katsuyuki Sumisawa and music composed by Kaoru Wada, both of whom also worked on the Inuyasha television series. Hideyuki Motohashi and Yoshihito Hishinuma were credited as character designers, with Motohashi also serving as chief animation director. Hishinuma was also the character designer of the television series.

At a retrospective screening in October 2025, producers Masuo Ueda, Michihiko Suwa and Mikihiro Iwata recalled the film's production. Iwata explained that the television series already had an established production team, requiring the film to be developed with a different group of staff. Suwa stated that the filmmakers had to create an original story rather than directly adapt material from the manga.

The film's original soundtrack, composed by Kaoru Wada, was released by Avex Mode on December 12, 2001, three days before the Japanese theatrical premiere. The album contains 29 tracks. Ayumi Hamasaki performs the film's theme song, "No More Words".

== Release ==
Affections Touching Across Time was released theatrically in Japan by Toho on December 15, 2001. The film debuted at number 11 at the Japanese box office. Eiga.com, reporting nationwide admissions figures supplied by Kōgyō Tsūshinsha, noted that the opening was below expectations, as the film had been regarded as a potential sleeper hit for the New Year release period. The film ultimately grossed ¥1.54 billion in Japan. On July 13, 2002, the film received a theatrical release in Taiwan distributed by Proware Multimedia.

In December 2013, the Japan Foundation organised special screenings of Affections Touching Across Time in India, with showings in Gurgaon and New Delhi on December 15 as part of Japan Cultural Month. The screenings were accompanied by planned discussions with Japanese voice actresses. A further screening was organised at Whistling Woods International in Mumbai on December 16, alongside a voice-acting workshop featuring Satsuki Yukino and Nami Okamoto.

Nearly 25 years after its original release, Affections Touching Across Time received its first theatrical release in South Korea on September 9, 2026, through the CGV cinema chain. The film debuted at number six at the South Korean daily box office, attracting 4,577 admissions on its opening day despite a limited release across 137 screens. By September 16, cumulative admissions had surpassed 20,000.

=== Home media ===
The film was released on home video in Japan in August 2002 by Shogakukan, with distribution by Toho. The DVD included 42 minutes of bonus material, including a television special, trailers, production artwork and a bonus audio drama CD.

In North America, Viz Media released the film on DVD in 2004. Viz subsequently partnered with Borders Group to promote the film alongside the first-season Inuyasha DVD set and related manga releases at Borders and Waldenbooks stores. On 26 March 2013, Viz Media released all four Inuyasha films together on Blu-ray in North America as Inuyasha the Movie: The Complete Collection.

In Spain, the film was released on DVD by Selecta Visión on June 2, 2005, under the title Inuyasha: La batalla a través del tiempo. On March 30, 2026, the distributor included the film in DVD and Blu-ray collections containing all four theatrical films, featuring Japanese, Spanish and Catalan audio tracks.

In France, Kazé released the film on DVD on September 30, 2009, under the title Inuyasha – Film 1: Au-delà du temps, featuring French and Japanese audio tracks. On November 18, 2010, Kazé included the film in a two-film DVD collection alongside Inuyasha the Movie: The Castle Beyond the Looking Glass.

In Italy, Dynit included the film in a five-disc DVD collection containing all four theatrical films on May 19, 2010. A Blu-ray collection containing all four films followed on September 27, 2017.

In Germany, the film was released on DVD by Red Planet, featuring German and Japanese audio tracks.

In Australia, Madman Entertainment released the film on DVD on May 17, 2006. In 2013, Madman Entertainment included the film in a four-film DVD collection alongside the three other Inuyasha films, featuring English and Japanese audio tracks.

== Reception ==
Reviewing the four-film collection for DVD Talk, Todd Douglass Jr. praised Affections Touching Across Time for its fast pace and balance between its principal characters and story elements. Although he did not consider it among the strongest anime films generally, he regarded it as one of the better entries among the four Inuyasha films.

Chris Wood of Anime Superhero gave the film a mixed review, finding it accessible to viewers unfamiliar with the television series. Although he criticised the main storyline as conventional and the romantic subplot as predictable, he praised the humour, supporting characters, particularly Miroku, and attractive animation. Wood considered the film an enjoyable fantasy adventure that would particularly appeal to fans of the series.
