= Kaoru Wada =

Japanese composer and arranger (born 1962)

Kaoru Wada 和田 薫
- Born: May 5, 1962 (age 64); Shimonoseki, Yamaguchi Prefecture, Japan
- Genres: Soundtrack; anison
- Occupations: Composer; arranger
- Years active: 1988-present
- Website: www.kaoru-wada.com

Kaoru Wada (和田 薫, Wada Kaoru; born May 5, 1962) is a Japanese composer and arranger. He has composed the scores for many anime series, including Inuyasha, D.Gray-man, Saint Seiya: The Lost Canvas, Samurai 7 and, more recently, Tesla Note.

He also became known to the West through his arranged works for orchestra and piano in video games like Kingdom Hearts and Kingdom Hearts II.

Wada, along with other later-famous musicians, studied at the Tokyo College of Music under Akira Ifukube and Sei Ikeno. He is also an apprentice of the famed Godzilla composer, Akira Ifukube. He is married to Inuyasha voice actress Akiko Nakagawa, who voices Sota Higurashi in that anime.

== Works ==
=== Anime ===
List of production work in anime
Year	Title	Note(s)	Ref(s)
1990	RPG Densetsu Hepoi		
1991	3×3 Eyes	OVA	
1991	Madara	OVA	
1991	Hero Kaede Mosaica	OVA	
1992	Tekkaman Blade		
1993	Shippū! Iron Leaguer		
1993	Ninja Scroll	Film	
1993	Battle Angel	OVA	
1993	The Cockpit	OVA	
1994	Ginga Sengoku Gun'yūden Rai		
1994	Shippū! Iron Leaguer Ginhikari no Hata no Shita ni	OVA	
1995	3×3 Eyes: Legend of the Divine Demon	OVA	
1996	GeGeGe no Kitarō (1996)	4th TV series	
1997	GeGeGe no Kitarō: Obake Nighter	Film	
1997	Jigoku Sensei Nūbē: Kyoufu no Natsu Yasumi! Asashi no Uni no Gensetsu	Film	
1999	Harlock Saga	OVA	
2000	Strange Dawn		
2000	Inuyasha		
2000	Ghost Stories		
2001	Inuyasha the Movie: Affections Touching Across Time	Film	
2001	Kikaider 01: The Animation		
2002	Princess Tutu		
2002	Inuyasha the Movie: The Castle Beyond the Looking Glass	Film	
2003	Gilgamesh		
2003	Inuyasha the Movie: Swords of an Honorable Ruler	Film	
2004	Mars Daybreak		
2004	Samurai 7		
2004	Inuyasha the Movie: Fire on the Mystic Island	Film	
2005	Mushiking: The King of Beetles	Film	
2005	Play Ball		
2006	Play Ball 2nd		
2006	D.Gray-man		
2007	Kindaichi Case Files Special	TV special (2 eps.)	
2008	Hakaba Kitarō		
2008	Casshern Sins		
2009	Saint Seiya: The Lost Canvas		
2009	Inuyasha: The Final Act		
2016	Ace Attorney		
2016	D.Gray-man Hallow		
2020	Yashahime: Princess Half-Demon		
2021	The Journey	Film	
2021	Tesla Note		
2024	Ranma ½		

=== Video games ===
List of production work in video games
Year	Title	Role(s)	Ref(s)
2002	Kingdom Hearts	Arranger	
2004	Kingdom Hearts: Chain of Memories	Arranger	
2005	Kingdom Hearts II	Arranger	
2010	Kingdom Hearts Birth by Sleep	Arranger	
2012	Asura's Wrath	Arranger	
