= Inuyasha the Movie: The Castle Beyond the Looking Glass =

2002 film by Toshiya Shinohara

- North American DVD cover art
- Kanji: 映画犬夜叉 鏡の中の夢幻城
- Literal meaning: InuYasha the Movie: Phantom Castle in the Mirror
- Revised Hepburn: Eiga Inuyasha: Kagami no Naka no Mugenjō
- Directed by: Toshiya Shinohara
- Screenplay by: Katsuyuki Sumisawa
- Based on: Inuyasha by Rumiko Takahashi
- Produced by: Mikihiro Iwata; Michihiko Suwa; Masuo Ueda
- Starring: Kappei Yamaguchi; Satsuki Yukino; Kumiko Watanabe; Kōji Tsujitani; Houko Kuwashima; Kenichi Ogata; Noriko Hidaka; Hisako Kyōda
- Cinematography: Hirofumi Yagi
- Edited by: Shigeyuki Yamamori
- Music by: Kaoru Wada
- Production company: Sunrise
- Distributed by: Toho
- Release date: December 21, 2002 (Japan)
- Running time: 99 minutes
- Country: Japan
- Languages: English; Japanese
- Budget: US$3.2 million
- Box office: $7,506,630

Inuyasha the Movie: The Castle Beyond the Looking Glass (Note: Also known as Inuyasha The Movie: Phantom Castle in the Mirror (Japanese: 映画犬夜叉 鏡の中の夢幻城, Hepburn: Eiga Inuyasha: Kagami no Naka no Mugenjō)) is a 2002 Japanese animated fantasy adventure film based on the Inuyasha manga series written and illustrated by Rumiko Takahashi. The film is directed by Toshiya Shinohara, written by Katsuyuki Sumisawa, and produced by Sunrise. It was released in Japan on December 21, 2002, and in the United States on December 28, 2004.

In the film, Inuyasha and his friends seemingly kill Naraku, and return to their normal lives. However, they encounter a new enemy named Kaguya, a character based on the literary classic The Tale of the Bamboo Cutter.

The Castle Beyond the Looking Glass is the second film of the Inuyasha series, following Affection Touching Across Time and followed up by Swords of an Honorable Ruler.

== Plot ==
Half-demon Inuyasha, schoolgirl Kagome, monk Miroku, demon slayer Sango, and fox demon Shippo battle and defeat their archenemy Naraku. As a result, Miroku's Wind Tunnel that Naraku cursed his family with disappears from his hand, while elsewhere, Sango's brother Kohaku is freed from Naraku's control.

With Naraku apparently defeated, Inuyasha, Kagome and Shippo part ways with Miroku and Sango to continue searching for the remaining shards of the Shikon Jewel. Miroku returns to his master, Mushin, and Sango returns to her village where she finds the amnesiac Kohaku. Mushin presents Miroku with a task that is to be given to the surviving descendant of his family who defeats Naraku: destroy a yōkai who threatens to cast the world into eternal night.

Kagura and Kanna, two of Naraku's incarnations, come across a mirror in a hidden shrine and awaken a maiden who declares herself to be Kaguya, Princess of the Heavens. In exchange for freeing her, Kaguya promises to give Kagura her true heart's desire; freedom. Kagura and Kanna set out to recover five items that will free Kaguya from her mirror completely.

Inuyasha travels to the modern era looking for Kagome, alongside her brother Sota. In town, Kagome angrily hides Inuyasha from the public in a photo booth, which Sota playfully pays to take photos of the two as they argue. Back in the Feudal era, Kagome cuts their faces from one of the photos and places them in a heart-shaped necklace locket that she offers to Inuyasha, who seemingly rejects it. They run into Kagura, Kanna and Kaguya, the former of which rips off a sleeve of Inuyasha's Robe of the Fire-Rat as it is one of the five items. Kagome forces the demons to flee after the battle, with Kaguya noticing the strange aura surrounding her that does not match the time of the Feudal era. Afterwards, Inuyasha, Kagome and Shippo meet Akitoki Hōjō, the ancestor of Kagome's classmate Hōjō, who plans to dispose a celestial robe into Mount Fuji.

Miroku and his tanuki servant Hachi learn, while searching for the yōkai he is meant to destroy, that his grandfather defeated Kaguya, leading to her celestial robe being entrusted to the Hōjō family. With Kaguya and Kanna having found the remaining items, Kaguya goes to find the robe alone. While battling Inuyasha for it, she restrains him to a tree, and Kagome sacrifices herself to protect him from a sacred arrow that Kaguya deflected from her. Kaguya takes Kagome captive, offering to release her alive in exchange for Inuyasha becoming Kaguya's servant.

Kaguya begins freezing time into eternal night. Kagura suspects that Kaguya is not who she says she is and tries to attack her, but Kaguya teleports Kagura and Kanna elsewhere. Following Inuyasha's escape, Hōjo and Shippo join him with Miroku, Hachi, Sango, Kohaku, and Sango's nekomata companion Kirara to infiltrate Kaguya's mountain castle in Lake Motosu. Excluding Hachi and Hōjō, they use items from Kagome's first aid kit from the modern era to survive the time freeze, while Inuyasha remains unaffected having worn Kagome's locket. They battle Kaguya to no avail, and she transforms Inuyasha into a full-fledged demon. Upon being freed by Shippo, Kagome shares a kiss with Inuyasha to revert him back to his normal self.

After Kaguya reveals that she is a demon who absorbed the real Kaguya, Naraku appears, having faked his death and hidden in Kohaku's back to wait for Kaguya's reappearance and absorb her power and gain his own immortality. The heroes defeat Kaguya before Naraku can absorb her, and she is killed by Miroku's restored Wind Tunnel. Everyone flees the collapsing castle through Kanna's mirror, with Naraku taking Kohaku with him. The heroes return to safety with time being reverted to normal. Inuyasha, Kagome, Miroku, Sango, Shippo and Kirara resume their mission to find the Shinkon Jewel shards, and Hōjō discards the robe at Mount Fuji.

== Voice cast ==
| Character | Japanese Voice Actor | English Voice Actor |
|---|---|---|
| Inuyasha | Kappei Yamaguchi | Richard Ian Cox |
| Kagome Higurashi | Satsuki Yukino | Moneca Stori |
| Miroku | Kōji Tsujitani | Kirby Morrow |
| Sango | Houko Kuwashima | Kelly Sheridan |
| Shippō | Kumiko Watanabe | Jillian Michaels |
| Kikyō | Noriko Hidaka | Willow Johnson |
| Myōga | Kenichi Ogata | Paul Dobson |
| Naraku | Toshiyuki Morikawa | Paul Dobson |
| Kagura | Izumi Ōgami | Janyse Jaud |
| Kanna | Yukana | Janyse Jaud |
| Kohaku | Akiko Yajima | Danny McKinnon |
| Hachiemon | Toshihiko Nakajima | Terry Klassen |
| Mushin | Yuzuru Fujimoto | Alec Willows |
| Hōjō/Akitoki Hōjō | Yūji Ueda | Matt Smith |
| Sōta Higurashi | Akiko Nakagawa | Saffron Henderson |
| Yuka | Kaori Shimizu | Jillian Michaels |
| Eri | Yuki Masuda | Saffron Henderson |
| Ayumi | Nami Okamoto | Cathy Weseluck |
| Kaguya | Mieko Harada | Nicole Oliver |

== Production ==
=== Development ===
The sequel followed the popularity of the Inuyasha television series. According to Sunrise, the filmmakers placed greater emphasis on action sequences than in the first film. The original story drew upon The Tale of the Bamboo Cutter, with manga creator Rumiko Takahashi participating in the development of the scenario.

The film was produced by Sunrise and shared several principal staff members with Inuyasha the Movie: Affections Touching Across Time (2001). Toshiya Shinohara returned as director, Katsuyuki Sumisawa wrote the screenplay, and Kaoru Wada composed the music. Hideyuki Motohashi and Yoshihito Hishinuma were credited as character designers, with Motohashi also serving as chief animation director.

A two-volume film-comic adaptation was published in Japan by Shogakukan under its Shōnen Sunday Comics Visual Selection imprint in July and August 2003.

=== Music ===
The film's theme song, "Yurayura", was performed by Every Little Thing. The duo also performed the insert song "Ai no Uta" (愛の謳), written by Kaori Mochida and composed by Kunio Tago.

The film's original soundtrack, composed by Kaoru Wada, was released by Avex Mode on 18 December 2002, three days before the film's Japanese theatrical premiere. The album contains 37 tracks, with a total running time of 55 minutes and 53 seconds.

== Release ==
The Castle Beyond the Looking Glass was released theatrically in Japan by Toho on December 21, 2002. It debuted at number seven at the Japanese box office. The film remained at number seven during both its second and third weekends. It ultimately grossed ¥1.05 billion in Japan.

On October 3, 2026, The Castle Beyond the Looking Glass received a special 35 mm film screening at the Third Ueda Anime Film Festival in Nagoya, Japan. The screening featured live commentary from producers Masuo Ueda and Michihiko Suwa, screenwriter Katsuyuki Sumisawa, and voice actress Satsuki Yukino, who portrayed Kagome Higurashi.

=== Home media ===
In Japan, the film was released on DVD on August 21, 2003, by Shogakukan, with distribution by Toho. The edition included 37 minutes of bonus video material, including promotional footage, theatrical trailers and character artwork, alongside a 60-minute audio drama CD.

In North America, Viz Media released the film on DVD on December 28, 2004. Viz and Score Entertainment cross-promoted the release with the Inuyasha collectible card game, with the DVD including a limited-edition promotional card. By April 2005, the DVD had sold more than 100,000 copies and, according to Viz, was the second-best-selling anime DVD in the United States during 2005 to that point. On March 26, 2013, Viz Media released all four Inuyasha films together on Blu-ray in North America as Inuyasha the Movie: The Complete Collection.

In Italy, the film was released on DVD by Dynit in May 2005 under the title Inuyasha the Movie – Il castello al di là dello specchio. On May 19, 2010, Dynit included the film in a five-disc DVD collection containing all four theatrical films. A two-disc Blu-ray collection containing all four films followed on September 27, 2017.

In Germany, the film was released on DVD by Red Planet in 2006 under the title InuYasha – The Movie 2: The Castle Beyond the Looking Glass. It was subsequently included in a four-film DVD collection released by Alive in November 2007.

In Spain, Selecta Visión released the film on DVD on April 22, 2009, under the title InuYasha: El castillo de sueños en el interior del espejo, featuring Spanish and Japanese audio tracks. On March 30, 2026, the distributor included the film in DVD and Blu-ray collections containing all four theatrical films, featuring Japanese, Spanish and Catalan audio tracks.

In France, Kazé released the film on DVD on January 20, 2010, under the title InuYasha – Film 2: Le Château des Illusions, featuring French and Japanese audio tracks. On November 18, 2010, the distributor included the film in a two-film DVD collection alongside Inuyasha the Movie: Affections Touching Across Time.

In Australia, Madman Entertainment included the film in a four-film Inuyasha DVD collection in 2013, featuring English and Japanese audio tracks.

== Reception ==
Reviewing the four-film collection for DVD Talk, Todd Douglass Jr. felt that The Castle Beyond the Looking Glass more closely resembled the television series than the first film, praising its storyline and improved animation while criticizing it for feeling like an extended television episode.

Joe Luscik of Animefringe awarded the film four out of five stars, praising its animation, character designs and action sequences. Although he considered the storyline unoriginal, he appreciated how the separate character subplots contributed to the overall narrative. Luscik concluded that the film would particularly appeal to fans of the television series, while viewers unfamiliar with Inuyasha might find it less accessible.
