= Inuyasha the Movie: Fire on the Mystic Island =

- Japanese theatrical release poster
- Kanji: 映画犬夜叉 紅蓮の蓬莱島
- Literal meaning: InuYasha the Movie: The Fire on Hōrai Island
- Revised Hepburn: Eiga Inuyasha: Guren no Hōraijima
- Directed by: Toshiya Shinohara
- Screenplay by: Katsuyuki Sumisawa
- Based on: Inuyasha by Rumiko Takahashi
- Produced by: Michihiko Suwa; Masuo Ueda; Mikihiro Iwata
- Starring: Kappei Yamaguchi; Satsuki Yukino
- Cinematography: Yudai Takahashi
- Edited by: Shigeyuki Yamamori
- Music by: Kaoru Wada
- Production company: Sunrise
- Distributed by: Toho
- Release date: December 23, 2004
- Running time: 88 minutes
- Country: Japan
- Language: Japanese
- Box office: $6,115,310

Inuyasha the Movie: Fire on the Mystic Island (Note: Also known as InuYasha The Movie: Fire on Hōrai Island (Japanese: 映画犬夜叉 紅蓮の蓬莱島, Hepburn: Eiga Inuyasha: Guren no Hōraijima)) is a 2004 Japanese animated fantasy adventure film based on the Inuyasha manga series written and illustrated by Rumiko Takahashi. The film is directed by Toshiya Shinohara, written by Katsuyuki Sumisawa, and produced by Sunrise. It was released in Japan on December 23, 2004.

In the film, Inuyasha and his friends protect a group of half-demon children from four evil gods on an ancient mystical island.

Fire on the Mystic Island is the fourth and final film of the Inuyasha series, following Swords of an Honorable Ruler. After the film's release, the anime adaptation of the manga concluded with the final season for the anime series, Inuyasha: The Final Act.

Around the time of its release, the movie was accompanied by a Hamtaro feature, Hamtaro: Fairy Tale.

== Plot ==
A group of half-demon children on Hōrai Island watch as a Kikyō look-alike comes to life in a green orb at the Cauldron of Resonance. Four scars, the mark of the Four War Gods Ryūra, Jūra, Kyōra, and Gōra, appear on all of the children's backs except for the youngest one, Ai. Asagi, the oldest, tells Ai to leave the island, and she is rescued by half-demon Inuyasha, schoolgirl Kagome Higurashi, monk Miroku, demon slayer Sango, fox demon Shippo, and Sango's nekomata companion Kirara.

After Ai asks for Inuyasha to save the others, Inuyasha explains to his friends the myth of Hōrai Island, a place that appears once every fifty years. He remembers when he and Kikyō arrived on the island fifty years ago and were ambushed by the Four War Gods, with Gōra extracting Kikyō's blood (used to make her doppelganger) and Ryūra marking Inuyasha's back with the four scars.

Following the island's reappearance, Kikyō learns of it and embarks to investigate, while Sesshomaru breaks off from his group - Jaken and Rin - to face Kyōra, who also gave him the four scars in the past. As Inuyasha and his group approach at the island, Jūra appears and fires his Thunder Cannon at them. Miroku and Sango fly away on Kirara to deter the attack, while Inuyasha, Kagome and Ai escape to the island shore where they meet Ryūra. Kagome interferes the battle and saves Inuyasha from Ryūra.

Ai brings the group to a village where they meet the children and learn that Asagi will sacrifice herself to the Cauldron of Resonance, arguing that her death will allow the others to live a little longer. They follow Asagi to the Cauldron, which Inuyasha and Asagi are trapped inside after he attempts to destroy it. On the outside, the rest of the gang and the children try to open the doors while Inuyasha meets Lady Kanade, a priestess who fought the War Gods 50 years ago. She explains how she attempted to destroy them by taking their power spheres with her into the Cauldron at the cost of her life, only for the Gods to resort to sacrificing half-demons to the Cauldron so they could slowly regain their power.

Lady Kanade gives Inuyasha a box containing the four power spheres and her remaining strength in exchange for him destroying the Cauldron and saving the children. Inuyasha and Asagi free themselves and destroy the Cauldron, the damage of which breaks Kagome's bow and arrow kit. The Kikyō look-alike ambushes Inuyasha after exiting the orb, stealing the power spheres and releasing them to the Four War Gods.

The group splits up for battle; Inuyasha fights against Kikyō's doppelgänger, Miroku and Sango fly on Kirara take on Jūra and Gōra, and Kagome, Shippo, and the children attempt to make a raft for everyone to escape the island, only to be confronted by Ryūra. Meanwhile, Sesshomaru defeats Kyōra, leaving the others to deal with the remaining War Gods. Inuyasha is saved by the real Kikyō after she destroys her doppelgänger, leaving behind her bow and arrow.

Inuyasha returns to the shore to kill Ryūra. After Miroku, Sango and Kirara destroy Jūra, they help Inuyasha defeat Gōra. Back on shore, the power spheres combine to form a new War God, with the only way to defeat it being a combination of Kagome's sacred arrow and Inuyasha's Backlash Wave attack. After one of the children, Shion, is guided to find Kikyō's arrow by the island's fireflies containing the spirits of those who were sacrificed, Kagome and Inuyasha use their powers to destroy the final War God once and for all, removing the four scars from those who were marked with them. The group escapes the island's destruction on the raft, putting its myth to rest. The children, after residing temporarily at Kaede's village, bid farewell to Inuyasha and his friends to pursue their freedom.

== Voice cast ==
Character	Japanese Voice Actor	English Voice Actor
Inuyasha	Kappei Yamaguchi	Richard Ian Cox
Kagome Higurashi	Satsuki Yukino	Moneca Stori
Miroku	Kōji Tsujitani	Kirby Morrow
Sango	Houko Kuwashima	Kelly Sheridan
Shippō	Kumiko Watanabe	Jillian Michaels
Kikyō	Noriko Hidaka	Willow Johnson
Sesshōmaru	Ken Narita	David Kaye
Jaken	Chō	Don Brown
Rin	Mamiko Noto	Brenna O'Brien
Ryūra	Nobutoshi Canna	Kristian Ayre
Kyōra	Nobuo Tobita	Ted Cole
Jūra	Takeshi Kusao	Jason Simpson
Gōra	Tadahisa Saizen	Ward Perry
Asagi	Fumiko Orikasa	Rebecca Shoichet
Dai	Yū Kobayashi	Gabe Khouth
Roku	Reiko Kiuchi	Gabe Khouth
Shion	Kaori Shimizu	Aidan Drummond
Moegi	Yuki Masuda	Justine Wong
Ai	Emi Motoi	Nicole Bouma
Lady Kanade	Tomiko Van	Rebecca Shoichet
Seiten	Tomonori Jinnai	Jason Simpson
Kujaku	Mitsuki Saiga	Anna Cummer

== Production ==
The fourth and final theatrical film was released three months after the original Inuyasha television series ended in September 2004. Sunrise retrospectively described the film as a concluding production for the series' staff and its fans. According to Cinema Today, manga creator Rumiko Takahashi participated in developing the original story, which was intended as a culmination of the series.

The film was produced by Sunrise and retained several principal staff members from the previous films. Toshiya Shinohara returned as director, Katsuyuki Sumisawa wrote the screenplay, and Kaoru Wada composed the music. Yoshihito Hishinuma, who had designed the characters for the Inuyasha television series, served as character designer and chief animation director.

A two-volume film-comic adaptation was published in Japan by Shogakukan under its Shōnen Sunday Comics Visual Selection imprint in July and August 2005.

The film's theme song, "Rakuen", was performed by Do As Infinity. Band members Tomiko Van and Ryo Owatari also made their voice-acting debuts in the film, portraying Lady Kanade and a villager, respectively. The film's original soundtrack, composed by Kaoru Wada, was released by Avex Mode on December 22, 2004, one day before the Japanese theatrical premiere. The album contains 38 tracks.

== Release ==
Fire on the Mystic Island was released theatrically in Japan by Toho on December 23, 2004. It was shown as a double feature with Hamtaro: Ham-Ham Paradise! Hamtaro and the Mysterious Ogre's Picture Book Tower.

The film debuted at number six at the Japanese box office during the weekend of December 25–26, 2004. It ranked eighth during its second weekend, seventh during its third, and ninth during its fourth. It grossed $6,073,347 in Japan. The film was subsequently released theatrically in Taiwan on June 24, 2005, distributed by Proware Multimedia. It grossed an additional $41,963 in Taiwan.

Viz Media presented the film's North American premiere on July 20, 2006, during San Diego Comic-Con, at the Pacific Gaslamp Theater in San Diego.

In December 2013, the Japan Foundation organised special screenings of Fire on the Mystic Island in New Delhi and Gurgaon, India, on December 22 and 25, respectively. The programme also advertised a post-screening discussion with voice actresses.

=== Home media ===
In Japan, the film was released on DVD on August 26, 2005, by Toho. The edition included a previously unreleased epilogue, promotional trailers, production artwork and highlights from a December 2004 Inuyasha appreciation event. It also included a bonus CD containing the original audio drama Guren no Hōrai Land, previously broadcast on the Japanese radio programme Anime Scramble on December 10 and 17, 2004.

In North America, Viz Media released the film on DVD on August 1, 2006. On March 26, 2013, Viz Media released all four Inuyasha films together on Blu-ray in North America as Inuyasha the Movie: The Complete Collection.

In Italy, the film was released in 2006 by Dynit as a two-disc DVD special edition under the title Inuyasha the Movie – L'isola del fuoco scarlatto. Its bonus material included coverage of an Inuyasha fan event held at the Future Film Festival in Bologna in January 2006, interviews with voice actors, a video-manga presentation and dubbing exercises. On May 19, 2010, Dynit included the film in a five-disc DVD collection alongside the other three Inuyasha films. A two-disc Blu-ray collection containing all four films followed in September 2017.

In Germany, the film was released on DVD by Red Planet on February 23, 2007, featuring German and Japanese audio tracks. The edition included an audio commentary involving members of the German Inuyasha fan project and a documentary examining the German dubbing process. The film was subsequently included in a four-film DVD collection distributed by Alive on November 2, 2007.

In Spain, Selecta Visión released the film on DVD on October 22, 2008, under the title InuYasha: Fuego en la isla mística, featuring Spanish and Japanese audio tracks. On March 30, 2026, the distributor included the film in DVD and Blu-ray collections containing all four theatrical films, featuring Japanese, Spanish and Catalan audio tracks.

In Australia, Madman Entertainment included the film in a four-film DVD collection in 2013, featuring English and Japanese audio tracks.

== Reception ==
Reviewing the four-film collection for DVD Talk, Todd Douglass Jr. regarded Fire on the Mystic Island as the weakest of the four Inuyasha films. He criticized its story and pacing, describing it as resembling an extended episode of the television series and considering it less engaging than its predecessors.

Stig Høgset of THEM Anime Reviews gave the film a mixed assessment, praising its detailed backgrounds, fluid animation and action sequences. However, he criticised the underdeveloped storyline and considered the Four War Gods unconvincing antagonists. Although he regarded the film as visually superior to its predecessor, he felt that it failed to match the quality of the first two films.
