= Inuyasha (video game) =

2001 role-playing video game

- Developer: Bandai
- Publisher: Bandai
- Platform: PlayStation
- Release: JP: December 27, 2001
- Genre: Role-playing
- Modes: Single-player, multiplayer

Inuyasha (Note: Japanese: 犬夜叉, Hepburn: Inu Yasha) is a role-playing game for PlayStation, developed and published by Bandai, which was released in Japan in 2001. The game is based on the events of the Inuyasha manga and anime. In this game, players work their way through various missions and stories that take place throughout the series.

== Premise ==
Playing as the characters from the series, players begin from the time Kagome falls through the well and meets her half-demon companion, and the story of Inuyasha unfolds from there. Inuyasha and Kagome build their relationship with each other, and along the way meet the familiar faces of Shippo, Miroku, Sango, Kirara, and resurrected Kikyo, and face off against enemies like Sesshoumaru and Naraku.

The game includes cutscenes, some of which were not included in the anime series and instead created for the game.

== Release ==
Inuyasha was released for the PlayStation in Japan on December 27, 2001.

== Reception ==
Reception

Review score
Publication	Score
Famitsu	6/10, 5/10, 7/10, 8/10

Two reviewers in Famitsu found the game retro in terms of graphics, gameplay and role-playing battles. While one reviewer said made the game a clunky curiosity, another said it was reminiscent of games of the two decades earlier and suffered from pacing issues.

Two reviewers in the magazine praised the voice-acting, with one saying it was an aspect that fans of the anime series would not find disappointing.

== See also ==
- List of PlayStation games
- List of video games based on anime or manga
