= Yashahime =

2020 Japanese anime television series

- Yashahime: Princess Half-Demon
- Japanese: 半妖の夜叉姫
- Revised Hepburn: Han'yō no Yashahime
- Type: TV series
- Genre: Adventure, fantasy
- Created by: Rumiko Takahashi
- Directed by: Teruo Sato (S1); Masakazu Hishida (S2)
- Series composition: Katsuyuki Sumisawa
- Character designers: Rumiko Takahashi (main); Yoshihito Hishinuma
- Music by: Kaoru Wada
- No. of seasons: 2
- No. of episodes: 48 (list of episodes)

Production
- Art directors: Shigemi Ikeda; Yukiko Maruyama
- Sound director: Yasushi Nagura
- Cinematographer: Shigemi Ogawa
- Color designer: Miyuki Satō
- Editor: Kazuhiro Nii
- Studios: Sunrise
- Executive producers: Kana Sasaki; Nobumasa Sawabe (1–13); Mikito Bizenjima (14–48); Shin Sasaki
- Producer: Hisakazu Naka
- Production company: Sunrise; Shogakukan; ytv

Original release
- Networks: NNS (ytv, Nippon TV)
- Release: October 3, 2020 – March 26, 2022

Related
- Manga
- Written by: Takashi Shiina; Katsuyuki Sumisawa
- Illustrated by: Takashi Shiina
- Published by: Shogakukan
- English publisher: NA: Viz Media
- Imprint: Shōnen Sunday Comics Special
- Magazine: Shōnen Sunday S
- Original run: September 25, 2021 – June 25, 2025
- Volumes: 10

Yashahime: Princess Half-Demon (Japanese: 半妖の夜叉姫, Hepburn: Han'yō no Yashahime) is a Japanese anime television series produced and animated by Sunrise. It is a sequel spin-off to the Inuyasha anime television series, which itself is based on the manga series Inuyasha by Rumiko Takahashi, who also provided the main character designs. The series follows the adventures of Towa Higurashi and Setsuna, Sesshomaru and Rin's fraternal twin daughters, and Moroha, Inuyasha and Kagome Higurashi's daughter.

The first season aired from October 2020 to March 2021, while the second season aired from October 2021 to March 2022. Viz Media has licensed the series in North America, while Medialink has licensed it for Southeast Asian and South Asian territories.

A manga adaptation, illustrated by Takashi Shiina, was serialized in Shogakukan's shōnen manga magazine Shōnen Sunday S from September 2021 to June 2025, with its chapters collected in ten tankōbon volumes.

== Plot ==
A decade after the final battle against Naraku, Sesshomaru and Rin's daughter Towa is separated from her twin sister Setsuna and becomes stranded in the modern era. She is adopted by the Higurashi family, raised by Sōta Higurashi, his wife Moe, and their daughter Mei. Years later, Towa reunites with Setsuna after passing through the Sacred Tree of Ages, discovering that her sister has become a demon slayer under Kohaku's guidance but has lost her memories due to the influence of the Dream Butterfly. Determined to restore Setsuna's past, the twins embark on a journey alongside their cousin Moroha, the daughter of Kagome and Inuyasha, who knows little of her parents beyond their identities as a powerful priestess and a half-demon warrior.

The Sacred Tree of Ages occasionally awakens to warn them of a looming threat—an ancient rival of their grandfather, the Great Dog-Demon, who seeks to manipulate time itself. Sesshomaru, unwilling to confront this enemy directly, remains distant while Rin is kept in suspended animation by a powerful time-manipulating entity. Her life is tied to Zero, the elder sister of Kirinmaru and creator of the Rainbow Pearls, whose powers rival the Sacred Jewel of Four Souls.

During a confrontation at the ruins of Izayoi's mansion, Setsuna is seemingly slain by Kirinmaru, but Towa revives her using the reforged Tenseiga, now named Yukari no Tachikiri, a blade capable of severing the threads of fate. Towa also inherits the Zanseiken from Rion, Kirinmaru's deceased daughter, whose soul resides within an artificial body. The twins eventually reunite with Rin after Zero lifts her curse, though Zero perishes soon after. Meanwhile, Kirinmaru forces Moroha to choose between rescuing her parents or seizing Akuru's time-altering pinwheel.

Sesshomaru and Kirinmaru resume their battle, with the former shielding the twins at great personal cost. Weakened, Sesshomaru sends them into the Black Pearl, where they encounter Inuyasha and Kagome. After escaping, they learn Kirinmaru's true goal: to travel to the Reiwa era and destroy the Grim Comet, a celestial threat to humanity, intending to rule over both humans and demons. Towa later realizes Kirinmaru allowed her to wield Zanseiken so he could eventually claim her body as a vessel for Rion, while Moroha receives a spiritually enhanced longbow crafted by her parents.

Using Akuru's pinwheel, the twins return to the modern era to confront the comet, pursued by Kirinmaru. They meet Osamu Kirin, Kirinmaru's former subordinate and Towa's teacher, who initially claims to share their goals but betrays them by transporting the comet to the feudal era. Akuru sacrifices himself to reopen the gateway, allowing the twins to rejoin their family and prevent the coming of the Degenerate Age.

== Media ==
=== Anime ===
The series was first announced in May 2020. It aired from October 3, 2020, to March 20, 2021, on Yomiuri TV and Nippon TV. The series was produced and animated by Sunrise, directed by Teruo Sato, with main character designs by Inuyasha original creator Rumiko Takahashi. Staff from Inuyasha returned, with Katsuyuki Sumisawa in charge of the scripts while Rumiko Takahashi acted as storyboard supervisor, Yoshihito Hishinuma in charge of the anime character designs and Kaoru Wada composing the music. The first opening theme is "New Era", performed by SixTones, while the first ending theme is "Break", performed by Uru. The second opening theme is "Burn", performed by NEWS, while the second ending theme is "Kesshō" (結証), performed by Ryokuoushoku Shakai.

On March 20, 2021, a second season of the series was announced following the release of the 24th episode. The second season, titled Yashahime: Princess Half-Demon – The Second Act, aired from October 2, 2021, to March 26, 2022. For the second season, the first opening theme is "ReBorn", performed by NEWS, while the ending theme is "Tōmei na Sekai" (透明な世界), performed by Little Glee Monster. The second opening theme is "Kyōmei" (共鳴), performed by SixTones, while the second ending theme is "Anaaki no Sora" (穴空きの空), performed by Adieu.

Viz Media announced the rights to digital streaming, EST, and home video release of the series in North America, and it was streamed on Crunchyroll, Funimation and Hulu. On October 26, 2020, Funimation announced a partnership with Viz Media to release an English dub of the series, with the English cast of Inuyasha reprising their roles. Funimation began streaming the English dub on November 6, 2020, along with Hulu and Crunchyroll. The English dub of the series aired on Adult Swim's Toonami programming block on June 27, 2021. Medialink licensed the series in Southeast Asian territories. The series premiered on Animax Asia on June 21, 2021.

=== Manga ===
A manga adaptation by Takashi Shiina, with script cooperation by Katsuyuki Sumisawa, was serialized in Shogakukan's Shōnen Sunday S from September 25, 2021, to June 25, 2025. Shogakukan collected its chapters in ten tankōbon volumes, released from January 18, 2022, to August 18, 2025.

Viz Media has licensed the manga for English release in North America. The publisher released the volumes from June 21, 2022, to September 8, 2026. On May 9, 2023, Viz Media launched its Viz Manga digital service, with the series's chapters receiving simultaneous English publication in North America as they were released in Japan.

==== Volumes ====
No.	Original release date	Original ISBN	English release date	English ISBN
1	January 18, 2022	978-4-09-850880-8	June 21, 2022	978-1-9747-3265-4
2	May 18, 2022	978-4-09-851144-0	December 20, 2022	978-1-9747-3449-8
3	October 12, 2022	978-4-09-851300-0	June 13, 2023	978-1-9747-1989-1
4	April 18, 2023	978-4-09-852035-0	December 12, 2023	978-1-9747-4115-1
5	August 18, 2023	978-4-09-852811-0	July 9, 2024	978-1-9747-4701-6
6	February 16, 2024	978-4-09-853038-0	January 14, 2025	978-1-9747-5175-4
7	May 17, 2024	978-4-09-853408-1	September 9, 2025	978-1-9747-5529-5
8	November 18, 2024	978-4-09-853756-3	January 13, 2026	978-1-9747-6194-4
9	May 16, 2025	978-4-09-854120-1	May 12, 2026	978-1-9747-6298-9
10	August 18, 2025	978-4-09-854214-7	September 8, 2026	978-1-9747-1665-4

== Reception ==
=== Anime ===
The series ranked ninth at the 43rd Animage's Anime Grand Prix in 2020. Rumiko Takahashi and Yoshihito Hishinuma were nominated for the Best Character Design category at the 5th Crunchyroll Anime Awards in 2021.

In her review of the first two episodes, Kara Dennison of Otaku USA made positive comments about the series, praising its cast and its way to "echo the story of Inuyasha without simply retreading it." By contrast, James Beckett and Monique Thomas of Anime News Network (ANN) listed the series as one of the worst anime of the Winter 2021 season. Beckett commented that Yashahime squandered the "goodwill" that Inuyasha had built up over the years, describing it as an incoherent and half-finished sequel spread across 24 episodes. Thomas noted that the characters regressed over the course of the series, and that there were unresolved plot elements and a difficult-to-follow narrative. Thomas stated that the series occasionally looked decent, had acceptable fight scenes, and featured a distinctive Inuyasha soundtrack. However, she argued that these elements did not compensate for the incoherent storytelling and contrived treatment of established characters, particularly Sesshomaru. Rebecca Silverman of the same website also listed it as one of the worst anime of 2021. She commented that she found the series difficult to like, citing lackluster animation and monster designs, muddled and delayed explanations, and a narrative that jumped between plotlines without delving deeply into any of them. Silverman felt the series deprived its heroines of meaningful development or action, describing the series as an ongoing disappointment that had not improved.

In his review of Viz Media's Season 1 Part 2 Blu-ray set, Chris Beveridge of The Fandom Post praised Yashahime's vibrant animation and color design, calling it technically accomplished, and considered its next-generation cast and themes well constructed. However, he felt that Moroha was underused as comic relief and that the series was too emotionally weighty for its young leads. He thought the series worked best in lighter, story-of-the-week moments.

Reviewing the second season, Charles Hartford of But Why Tho? considered its main flaw to be its length, noting that its 24 episodes were bloated with filler and overlong side plots. However, he added that the series grew more focused later on. He praised the growth of the main trio, the expanded focus on side characters and villains—especially Lady Zero's arc—and the varied monster designs and flashy action. He concluded that fans of the first season would find enough to enjoy.

Beckett and Sage Ashford of CBR criticized the series for portraying Sesshomaru and Rin as a couple, since Sesshomaru traveled with a young Rin in the original Inuyasha series. In her review of Episode 15, Olive St. Sauver of But Why Tho? emphasized that while she was not accusing the writers of condoning grooming, and she acknowledged that Sesshomaru is a demon and that the supernatural element could render the age-difference argument invalid, she maintained that the relationship "has undertones of grooming".

=== Manga ===
Reviewing the first volume for ANN, Silverman considered the Yashahime manga more palatable than its anime adaptation, attributing this to the involvement of Rumiko Takahashi and Takashi Shiina. She found the volume a natural continuation of Inuyasha despite its largely different cast, and praised its grounding, particularly Towa's upbringing with the Higurashi family and her conflicted characterization. She noted the action was dynamic and the monsters Takahashi-esque, though body language was less effective, and suggested the manga's pacing may prove more enjoyable than the anime's. MrAJCosplay considered the manga superior to the anime, which he found disappointing and drawn-out. He praised its focus on the titular character over converging storylines, finding its pacing and personal focus more accessible to newcomers despite being more rewarding for franchise fans. He noted messy action art but recommended it to those dissatisfied with the anime. Sheena McNeil of Sequential Tart considered the manga a solid read that did not require familiarity with the anime or Inuyasha to follow. She preferred Shiina's art to Takahashi's, finding it fiercer and bolder with more mature-looking characters, and praised the character designs and the story's mystery, adventure, and fight scenes, particularly its three female leads. However, she noted some unexplained elements, such as Setsuna's curse, and questioned Towa's unchanged modern clothing.
