= Inuyasha =

Japanese manga series

- First tankōbon volume cover, featuring Inuyasha and Kagome Higurashi

犬夜叉
- Genre: Adventure; Fantasy; Romance
- Manga
- Written by: Rumiko Takahashi
- Published by: Shogakukan
- English publisher: NA: Viz Media
- Imprint: Shōnen Sunday Comics
- Magazine: Weekly Shōnen Sunday
- Original run: November 13, 1996 – June 18, 2008
- Volumes: 56
- Anime television series
- Inuyasha (2000–2004); Inuyasha: The Final Act (2009–2010)
- Anime films
- Affections Touching Across Time (2001); The Castle Beyond the Looking Glass (2002); Swords of an Honorable Ruler (2003); Fire on the Mystic Island (2004)
- Sequel spin-off
- Yashahime (2020–2022)
- icon

Inuyasha (犬夜叉; lit. 'Dog Yaksha') is a Japanese manga series written and illustrated by Rumiko Takahashi. It was serialized in Shogakukan's shōnen manga magazine Weekly Shōnen Sunday from November 1996 to June 2008, with its chapters collected in 56 tankōbon volumes. The series follows Kagome Higurashi, a fifteen-year-old middle school girl from modern-day Tokyo who is transported to the Sengoku period after falling into a well in her family shrine, where she meets the half-dog demon, half-human Inuyasha. After the sacred Shikon Jewel re-emerges from deep inside Kagome's body, she inadvertently shatters it into dozens of fragments that scatter across Japan. Inuyasha and Kagome set out to recover the Jewel's fragments, and through their quest, they are joined by the lecherous monk Miroku, the demon slayer Sango, and the fox demon Shippō. Together, they journey to restore the Shikon Jewel before it falls into the hands of the evil half-demon Naraku.

In contrast to the typically comedic nature of much of Takahashi's previous work, Inuyasha explores darker, more serious subject matter, using the Sengoku period setting to depict violence while still retaining comedic elements. The manga was adapted into two anime television series by Sunrise. The first series ran for 167 episodes on Yomiuri TV, Nippon Television, and their affiliates from October 2000 to September 2004. The second series, Inuyasha: The Final Act, is a direct sequel that adapts the remainder of the manga and ran for 26 episodes from October 2009 to March 2010. Four feature films and an original video animation (OVA) have also been released. Other merchandise includes video games and a light novel. An anime-original sequel spin-off television series, titled Yashahime: Princess Half-Demon, aired for two seasons from October 2020 to March 2022.

Viz Media licensed the manga, the two anime series, and the movies for release in North America. Both Inuyasha and Inuyasha: The Final Act aired in the United States on Adult Swim (and later on its revived Toonami block) from 2002 to 2015.

By September 2020, Inuyasha had 50 million copies in circulation, making it one of the best-selling manga series of all time. In 2002, the manga won the 47th Shogakukan Manga Award for the shōnen category.

== Plot ==
In 1496 Japan, humans and demons (yōkai) battle over the Shikon Jewel (四魂の玉, Shikon no Tama; lit. 'The Jewel of Four Souls'), which is said to grant any wish. Kikyo, the priestess who keeps the Shikon Jewel, is in love with the half-demon Inuyasha. However, they fall into a deceitful trap and betray each other. Inuyasha steals the Shikon Jewel, but the dying Kikyo pins Inuyasha to a tree with a sacred arrow. Per Kikyo's will, her body is cremated along with the Shikon Jewel, which disappeared from the era.

Five hundred years later, Kagome Higurashi lives on the grounds of her family's Shinto shrine, with her mother, grandfather and younger brother. On her fifteenth birthday, Kagome is dragged into the enshrined Bone Eater's Well (骨喰いの井戸, Honekui no Ido) by a centipede demon and sent back in time to the Sengoku period in 1546. The Shikon Jewel manifests from within the body of Kagome, who is Kikyo's reincarnation, and she desperately frees Inuyasha from the tree to kill the centipede demon. When Inuyasha threatens her, Kikyo's sister Kaede subdues him with a magical bead necklace to keep him under control. Later, Kagome inadvertently shatters the Shikon Jewel into many shards with an arrow; they scatter across Japan and into the possession of various demons and humans.

Inuyasha obtains his father's sword Tessaiga, which places him at odds with his older half-brother Sesshomaru, the wielder of Tenseiga. Inuyasha aids Kagome in collecting the shards and dealing with the threats they encounter. On their journey, the presence of Naraku, a spider half-demon who was responsible for manipulating Inuyasha and Kikyo, comes to light. While pursuing Naraku, Inuyasha and Kagome recruit the young fox demon Shippō, the perverted monk Miroku (whose hand was cursed by Naraku), and the demon slayer Sango and her two-tailed demon cat Kirara. Sango's clan was killed when Naraku tricked them, and her younger brother Kohaku fell under his control. Over time, Inuyasha enhances Tessaiga into stronger forms while defeating his enemies. His team is loosely allied with Sesshomaru, whom Naraku attempted to manipulate; the resurrected Kikyo, who plans to purify the Shikon Jewel if all shards are collected; and Kōga, the leader of a wolf demon tribe who seeks to avenge his comrades whom Naraku killed. As Inuyasha and his friends journey together, he and Kagome begin to fall in love, which is complicated by Inuyasha's lingering feelings for Kikyo.

Desperately hunted by his enemies, Naraku temporarily removes his heart and wounds Kikyo. Kohaku, having been previously killed but later revived by Naraku and kept alive and under his control by a Shikon Jewel shard, eventually regains his free will and memories and attempts to escape Naraku's group. During that time, Sesshomaru settles his feud with Inuyasha to enable his brother to perfect Tessaiga to its maximum power. Kikyo sacrifices herself to give life to Kohaku, and Naraku collects all the shards to restore the Shikon Jewel. As Naruka is about to be slain by Inuyasha and his allies, he reveals his true desire for Kikyo, despite his hatred towards her, and he uses his wish to trap himself and Kagome inside the Shikon Jewel before dying. Revealed to be sentient, the Shikon Jewel intends for Kagome to make a selfish wish so that she and Naraku will be trapped in an eternal conflict, thus prolonging the Jewel's existence. However, with Inuyasha by her side, Kagome wishes for the Shikon Jewel to disappear forever, allowing her to return to her time with the well sealed, and she and Inuyasha lose contact for three years.

In that time, the Sengoku period changes drastically: Sango and Miroku marry and have three children together, Kohaku continues his role as a demon slayer, and Shippō trains to make his demon magic stronger. Back in the present, Kagome graduates from high school and manages to get the Bone Eater's Well in her backyard to work again. She returns to the Sengoku period, where she reunites with Inuyasha, marries him, and trains with Kaede to become a top-level priestess.

== Development ==
Takahashi wrote Inuyasha after finishing her previous manga, Ranma ½ (1987–1996). In contrast to her previous comedic works such as Urusei Yatsura (1978–1987), Maison Ikkoku (1980–1987), and One-pound Gospel (1987–2006), she wanted to create a darker storyline that was thematically closer to her Mermaid Saga stories. To portray violent themes softly, the story was set in the Sengoku period, when wars were common. Takahashi did no notable research on the designs of samurai and castles because she considered such topics common knowledge. By June 2001, a clear ending to the series had not been established because Takahashi was still unsure how to end the relationship between Inuyasha and Kagome. Furthermore, Takahashi said that she did not have an ending to the previous manga she wrote during the beginning, having figured them out as their serialization progressed.

== Media ==
=== Manga ===
Written and illustrated by Rumiko Takahashi, Inuyasha debuted in Shogakukan's shōnen manga magazine Weekly Shōnen Sunday on November 13, 1996 (issue #50, 1996). Inuyasha finished after an 11-year and seven-month run in the magazine on June 18, 2008. Its 558 chapters were collected in 56 tankōbon volumes by Shogakukan, released from April 18, 1997, to February 18, 2009. Shogakukan re-published the series in a 30-volume wide-ban edition, released from January 18, 2013, to June 18, 2015. Takahashi published a special epilogue chapter, titled "Since Then" (あれから, Are kara), in Weekly Shōnen Sunday on February 6, 2013, as part of the "Heroes Come Back" anthology, which comprised short stories by manga artists to raise funds for recovery of the areas afflicted by the 2011 Tōhoku earthquake and tsunami. The chapter was later included in the last volume of the wide-ban edition of the manga in 2015, and was published again in Shōnen Sunday S on October 24, 2020.

In North America, Inuyasha has been licensed for English language release by Viz Media, initially titled as Inu-Yasha. They began publishing the manga in April 1997 in an American comic book format, each issue containing two or three chapters from the original manga. The last issue was released in February 2003, which covered up until the original Japanese 14th volume. Viz Media started publishing the series in a first trade-paperback edition, with 12 volumes published from July 6, 1998, to October 6, 2002. A second edition began with the 13th volume, released on April 9, 2003, and the first 12 volumes, following this edition, were reprinted as well. Up until the 37th volume, Viz Media published the series in left-to-right orientation, and with the release of the 38th volume on July 14, 2009, they published the remaining volumes in "unflipped" right-to-left page layout. Viz Media published the 56th and final volume of Inuyasha on January 11, 2011. In 2009, Viz Media began publishing the series in their 3-in-1 omnibus volume "VizBig" edition, with the original unflipped chapters. The 18 volumes were released from November 10, 2009, to February 11, 2014. On December 15, 2020, Viz released the 18 volumes digitally.

=== Anime ===
==== Inuyasha ====
The first Inuyasha anime adaptation, sometimes known as Inuyasha: A Feudal Fairy Tale (戦国御伽草子 犬夜叉, Sengoku Otogizōshi Inuyasha), produced by Sunrise, was broadcast for 167 episodes on Yomiuri TV, Nippon Television, and their affiliates from October 16, 2000, to September 13, 2004.

==== Inuyasha: The Final Act ====
In July 2009, it was announced that another anime television series adaptation, covering the original 36–56 volumes of the manga, would be made by the same cast and crew as the first anime. Titled Inuyasha: The Final Act (犬夜叉 完結編, Inuyasha Kanketsu-hen), the series was broadcast for 26 episodes on Nippon TV and Yomiuri TV from October 4, 2009, to March 30, 2010. (Note: The series first premiered on Nippon TV and two days later on Yomiuri TV. Nippon TV listed the series premiere on Saturday at 26:20, which is effectively Sunday at 2:20 a.m. JST. Despite the series first premiering on Nippon TV, it completed its first premiere run on Yomiuri TV on March 30, 2010, days ahead of Nippon TV on April 4, due to the latter network suspending series broadcast for one week back on January 3.)

==== Yashahime: Princess Half-Demon ====
In May 2020, an anime original sequel spin-off television series was announced, titled Yashahime: Princess Half-Demon (半妖の夜叉姫, Han'yō no Yashahime), which follows the journey of Towa Higurashi and Setsuna, Sesshomaru and Rin's fraternal twin daughters, and Moroha, Inuyasha, and Kagome's daughter. It premiered on October 3, 2020.

The series is produced by Sunrise, and was directed by Teruo Sato for the first season and Masakazu Hishida for the second, with character design by Inuyasha author Rumiko Takahashi. Staff from the Inuyasha anime returned, with writer Katsuyuki Sumisawa, character designer Yoshihito Hishinuma, and composer Kaoru Wada. The cast includes Sara Matsumoto as Towa Higurashi, Mikako Komatsu as Setsuna, and Azusa Tadokoro as Moroha.

Viz Media announced the rights to digital streaming, EST, and home video release of the series for North and Latin American territories.

=== Films ===
There are four animated Inuyasha films with original storylines written by Katsuyuki Sumisawa, the writer for the Inuyasha anime series. All were released in Japan in December of their respective release years. The films were released with English subtitles and dubs on Region 1 DVD by Viz Media. Together, the four films have earned over US$20 million at Japanese box offices.

The first film, Inuyasha the Movie: Affections Touching Across Time, was released in 2001. In the film, Inuyasha and his friends confront Menomaru, a demonic moth warrior brought to life by one of the shards.

In the second film, Inuyasha the Movie: The Castle Beyond the Looking Glass, released in 2002, the group seemingly kills Naraku for good and returns to their normal lives, only to encounter a new enemy named Kaguya, a character based on the literature The Tale of the Bamboo Cutter.

The third film, Inuyasha the Movie: Swords of an Honorable Ruler, was released in 2003. In it, Inuyasha and Sesshomaru forcefully work together to seal the evil Sō'unga, their father's third sword, when it is awakened from its sheath.

The fourth and final film, Inuyasha the Movie: Fire on the Mystic Island, was released in 2004. It follows Inuyasha and his friends protecting a group of half-demon children from four evil demons on an ancient mystical island.

=== Original video animation ===
A 30-minute original video animation titled Black Tessaiga (黒い鉄砕牙, Kuroi Tessaiga) was presented on July 30, 2008, at an "It's a Rumic World" exhibit at the Matsuya Ginza department store in Tokyo's Ginza shopping district. The episode features the original voice cast from the anime series. It was released in Japan on October 20, 2010, in both DVD and Blu-ray formats.

=== Soundtrack CDs ===
Multiple soundtracks and character songs were released for the series by Avex Mode. Three character singles were released August 3, 2005 – "Aoki Yasei o Daite" (蒼き野生を抱いて; Embrace the Untamed Wilderness) by Inuyasha featuring Kagome, "Kaze no Naka e" (風のなかへ; Into the Wind) by Miroku featuring Sango and Shippō, and "Gō" (業; Fate) by Sesshomaru featuring Jaken and Rin. The singles charted at number 63, 76, and 79, respectively, on the Oricon chart. Three more character songs were released on January 25, 2006 – "Rakujitsu" (落日; Setting Sun) by Naraku, "Tatta Hitotsu no Yakusoku" (たったひとつの約束; That's One Promise) by Kagome Higurashi, and "Abarero!!" (暴れろ!!; Go On A Rampage!!) by Bankotsu and Jakotsu. The singles charted at number 130, 131, and 112, respectively, on the Oricon chart.

On March 24, 2010, Avex released Inuyasha Best Song History (犬夜叉 ベストソング ヒストリー, Inuyasha Besuto Songu Hisutorī), a best album that contains all the opening and ending theme songs used in the series. The album peaked at number 20 on the Oricon album chart and charted for seven weeks.

=== Video games ===
Three video games based on the series were released for the WonderSwan: Inuyasha: Kagome no Sengoku Nikki (犬夜叉 〜かごめの戦国日記, Inuyasha: Kagome's Warring States Diary), Inuyasha: Fūun Emaki (犬夜叉 風雲絵巻, Inuyasha: The Sealed Scroll Picture), and Inuyasha: Kagome no Yume Nikki (犬夜叉 かごめの夢日記, Inuyasha: Kagome's Dream Diary).

A single title, Inuyasha: Naraku no Wana! Mayoi no Mori no Shōtaijō (犬夜叉〜奈落の罠!迷いの森の招待状, Inuyasha: Naraku's Trap! Invitation to the Forest of Illusion), was released for the Game Boy Advance on January 23, 2003, in Japan.

Inuyasha has been adapted into a mobile game released for Java and Brew handsets on June 21, 2005.

Two titles were released for the PlayStation: an RPG titled Inuyasha, and the fighting game Inuyasha: A Feudal Fairy Tale, the latter of which was released in North America. For the PlayStation 2, the two released games were the RPG Inuyasha: The Secret of the Cursed Mask and the fighting game Inuyasha: Feudal Combat, which also received an English version. An English-only RPG, Inuyasha: Secret of the Divine Jewel, was released for the Nintendo DS on January 23, 2007.

Inuyasha appeared in the crossover video game Sunday vs Magazine: Shūketsu! Chōjō Daikessen as a playable character.

Inuyasha's sword, Tessaiga, has appeared in Monster Hunter as a craftable weapon using items gained from a special event.

An English-language original collectible card game created by Score Entertainment was released on October 20, 2004.

=== Light novel ===
A light novel, written by Tomoko Komparu and illustrated by Rumiko Takahashi, was published by Shogakukan on December 10, 2004.

=== Stage plays ===
In 2000, a Japanese live-action stage play ran from April through May in the Akasaka ACT Theater in Tokyo, around the same time the anime series began production. The play's script followed the general plotline of the original manga, with a few minor changes to save time. A second run of the play ran from January through February 2001 at the Akasaka ACT Theater in Tokyo.

In February 2017, it was announced that a stage play adaptation of Inuyasha would be performed at Tennozu Galaxy Theater in Tokyo from April 6–15 of the same year, featuring Yutaka Kyan from Golden Bomber as Inuyasha and Nogizaka46's Yumi Wakatsuki as Kagome.

== Reception ==
Inuyasha was one of the Manga Division's Jury Recommended Works at the fifth and 12th installments of the Japan Media Arts Festival in 2001 and 2008, respectively. In 2002, the manga won the 47th Shogakukan Manga Award in the shōnen category. On TV Asahi's Manga Sōsenkyo 2021 poll, in which 150,000 people voted for their top 100 manga series, Inuyasha ranked 28th.

By February 2010, Inuyasha had over 45 million copies in circulation. By September 2020, the manga had over 50 million copies in circulation. Individual volumes from Inuyasha have been popular in Japan, taking high places in rankings listing sales. In North America, the manga volumes have appeared various times in The New York Times and Diamond Comic Distributors top selling lists. Moreover, Inuyasha was one of the most researched series in 2005 according to Lycos.

Reviewing volume two for Ex.org, Eri Izawa wrote that Inuyasha combines many of Rumiko Takahashi's best elements: "fast-paced action, interesting characters, deep doses of imaginative fantasy, a bit of horror, and those famous touches of Takahashi humor." She also praised the "undeniably intelligent and observant" Kagome as refreshing. Izawa described the faults of the series as subtle and minor, feeling that the action sometimes seems to drag a little and that some of the characters are too familiar to those from Takahashi's previous works. Rebecca Bundy began her review of volume 23 of Inuyasha for Anime News Network by claiming, "Twenty-three volumes in and this series still packs a serious punch." She called the balance of action, conversation, and "reflection" perfect, and noted it had plenty of character development for the main cast, sans Koga. Bundy's sole complaint was that she felt the character designs had changed a modest amount since the beginning of the series. Even though they had not read Inuyasha since around volume six, Manga Life's Penny Kenny said they were able to jump right in with volume 52 thanks in part to the sense of familiarity provided by Takahashi "riffing on the same themes." Kenny stated that Takahashi's genius lies in her "endless improvisations on the standard elements" by adding new enemies and monsters, which forces the heroes to up their game and grow as individuals. The reviewer described the art as having little background detail, with Takahashi instead focusing on the characters and their actions. Kenny also noted that, like all of the manga artist's works, the drama is heightened by levity, with each character having their own style of humor.

== See also ==
- The Holy Pearl, a 2011 Chinese TV series partially inspired by Inuyasha
- Nansō Satomi Hakkenden, a 19th-century novel from which Inuyasha draws some of its motifs
