= Kōji Tsujitani =

Japanese actor (1962–2018)

- 辻谷 耕史
- Born: April 26, 1962; Kodaira, Tokyo, Japan
- Died: October 17, 2018 (aged 56); Tokyo, Japan
- Occupations: Actor; voice actor; narrator; director of audiography
- Years active: 1986–2018
- Notable work: Mobile Suit Gundam 0080: War in the Pocket as Bernie Wiseman; 3×3 Eyes as Yakumo Fujii; Mobile Suit Gundam F91 as Seabook Arno; Irresponsible Captain Tylor as Justy Ueki Tylor; Eureka Seven as Dewey Novak; Inuyasha as Miroku
- Spouse: Kumiko Watanabe (m. 2012)
- Website: www.koji-tsujitani.com

Kōji Tsujitani (辻谷 耕史, Tsujitani Kōji; April 26, 1962 – October 17, 2018) was a Japanese actor, voice actor, narrator and director of audiography credited for voicing many anime and video game characters. He was formerly affiliated with Sigma Seven. He married Kumiko Watanabe in 2012. He died of a stroke on October 17, 2018.

== Filmography ==
=== Anime ===
- Mobile Suit Gundam 0080: War in the Pocket (1989), Bernard Wiseman
- 3×3 Eyes (1991), Yakumo Fujii
- The Brave Fighter of Sun Fighbird (1991–1992), Guard Rescue
- Mobile Suit Gundam F91 (1991), Seabook Arno
- Otaku no Video (1991), (Ken Kubo)
- Video Girl Ai (1992), (Takashi Niimai)
- Irresponsible Captain Tylor (1993), Tylor
- Genocyber (1994), Ryuu
- YuYu Hakusho (1994), (Itsuki)
- Saint Tail (1995), Noguchi
- Street Fighter II V (1995), Ryu
- Escaflowne (1996), Jajuka
- Grander Musashi (1997), Sugeru
- Hajime no Ippo (2000), Ryuichi Hayami
- InuYasha (2001), Miroku
- PaRappa the Rapper (2001), Matt's Father
- Maburaho (2003), Akai Haruaki
- Kyou Kara Maou (2004–2009), Shouma Shibuya
- Blood+ (2005–2006), Solomon Goldsmith
- Eureka Seven (2005), Dewey Novak
- Guardian of the Sacred Spirit (2007), Tanda
- Code:Breaker (2012), Goutoku Sakurakouji
- Kokkoku: Moment by Moment (2018), Sakafumi Yukawa
- My Sexual Harassment series 1 (xxxx), (Youhei Fujita)
- Nurarihyon no Mago (xxxx), (Hihi)
- Ranma ½ (xxxx), (Hiroshi, Tatewaki Kuno (2nd temporary voice and OVA 13), Yasukichi, Crepe King, and Sotatsu)
- RG Veda (xxxx), (Ten-oh)
- Salamander (xxxx), (Dan)
- Sengoku Basara (xxxx), (Azai Nagamasa)
- Slam Dunk (xxxx), (Kenji Fujima)
- Violinist of Hameln (xxxx), (Raiel)

=== Drama CDs ===
- Kami-sama wa Ijiwaru Janai (Yuuya Hoshino)
- Katsuai series 2: Bakuren (Yoshiki Takatou)
- Koikina Yatsura 1 - 3 & side story (Mizuki Seo)
- Mirage of Blaze series 2: Saiai no Anata he (Nobutsuna Naoe)
- My Sexual Harassment series 1 (Youhei Fujita)
- Okane ga nai series 3: Kawaige Nai (Misao Kuba)
- Okane ga nai series 4: Okane ja Kaenai (Misao Kuba)
- Pearl series 1: Ijiwaru na Pearl (Tomoaki Matsumiya)
- Pearl series 2: Yokubari na Pearl (Tomoaki Matsumiya)
- Pearl series 3: Wagamama na Pearl (Tomoaki Matsumiya)
- Pearl series 4: Kimagure na Pearl (Tomoaki Matsumiya)

=== Anime CDs ===
- Kouji Tsujitani feat. Houko Kuwashima and Kumiko Watanabe in 風のなかへ - Into the Wind (Kaze no Naka e) -->

=== Dubbing ===
- The Matrix Revolutions, Seraph (Collin Chou)
- Psycho, Norman Bates (Anthony Perkins)
- Super Mario Bros., Luigi (John Leguizamo)
- Training Day, Officer Jake Hoyt (Ethan Hawke)
- The Matrix Reloaded, Seraph (Collin Chou), Agent Johnson (Daniel Bernhardt)
