= Inuyasha (character) =

Fictional character from Inuyasha

- Inuyasha character
- Inuyasha as illustrated by Rumiko Takahashi wielding Tessaiga
- First appearance: "The Accursed Youth" (1996)
- Created by: Rumiko Takahashi
- Voiced by: Japanese; Kappei Yamaguchi; English; Richard Ian Cox

In-universe information
- Species: Dog-Demon/Human
- Weapon: Tetsusaiga (Tessaiga)
- Family: Tōga (father); Izayoi (mother); Sesshōmaru (older half-brother)
- Spouses: Kagome Higurashi
- Children: Moroha (daughter) (Note: Anime only)
- Friends: Miroku; Sango

Inuyasha (Japanese: 犬夜叉) is the main male protagonist and titular character of the 1996 fantasy manga series Inuyasha, created by Rumiko Takahashi, as well as several adaptations of the manga series, most notably the 2000 anime TV series of the same name and its 2009 direct sequel, Inuyasha: The Final Act.

He is a half-demon, half-human from the Sengoku period of Japan, who once started off as a selfish and ill-tempered individual, bearing extreme hatred towards humanity after being seemingly betrayed by his former lover, the priestess Kikyō, and sought to find the pieces of the Shikon Jewel in order to become a full demon. This ultimately leads to him being forced to team up with Kagome Higurashi, a modern era middle school girl who possesses spiritual powers that allows her to find the jewel pieces, so he could achieve his goal of becoming a full demon.

Over the course of the series, he and Kagome would begin to grow closer to each other and build new bonds with other characters, while Inuyasha slowly but surely grows to accept his half-heritage as he goes through certain events that shows him the truth of being a full demon, thus completely rejecting his original goals of becoming a complete demon. While on their journey to recover the jewel pieces, he and his friends would often encounter those who sought the jewel pieces for their own selfish gain, with the most recurring threat among them being a half-demon known as Naraku, who serves as Inuyasha's arch-enemy and foil, as it is revealed that he was the one who caused the conflict between Inuyasha and Kikyō.

He later returns in the 2020 anime spin-off sequel seriesYashahime: Princess Half-Demon, where he and Kagome, who is now Inuyasha's wife as well as a priestess in the Sengoku period, becomes the parents of Moroha, who is one of the main characters in the sequel series.

Since the series' debut in 1996, Inuyasha has been widely known across the world as one of the most recognizable and iconic characters in manga and anime history. He received critical acclaim by many for his design, his character development, his relationship with Kagome and Kikyō, and the vocal performances by Yamaguchi and Cox respectively, as well as for his tsundere behavior and being a flawed yet relateable character.

== Concept and creation ==
When Rumiko Takahashi began the series, the only ideas she had were Inuyasha being sealed by Kikyō and his sword being a relic from his father, everything after that was thought up on a weekly basis. Inuyasha's name simply comes from the fact that he is part dog (inu in Japanese) and part yasha.

In June 2001, the author said that she did not know what would come of Inuyasha and Kagome's back-and-forth relationship, but that she did intend for it to have a resolution. She also said that she purposely avoided having those two and Kikyō appear at the same time, as Inuyasha always likes "the girl he is with" more.

When asked which chapters of the series she enjoyed drawing the most, Takahashi cited the one with Inuyasha in his black-haired human form during the new moon because it was "new and fun" and the chapters where Inuyasha came to the present-day because she could take a break from drawing battles and show "some fun and laughter", among others.

From the earliest of production meetings for the anime adaptation, Takahashi's only request was that Kappei Yamaguchi voice Inuyasha. Due to the use of unusual names in the series, Yamaguchi and many of the other actors often wondered how to pronounce certain names, such as Kikyō and Shikon Jewel.

== Appearances ==
Inuyasha is a hybrid of human and dog yōkai who first appears sealed to a tree in the feudal world. When a girl named Kagome Higurashi is being chased by a yōkai, Inuyasha convinces her to free him so that he might eliminate the enemy. Despite initially distrusting Kagome, Inuyasha joins forces with her to search for the shards of the Jewel of Four Souls, the Shikon Jewel, which increase a yōkai's powers. Although Inuyasha first aims to become a full demon using the Jewel, as the story progresses he develops strong bonds with the comrades who aid him.

Inuyasha's appearance is a mixture of his dog demon father and human mother: he has his father's long silver hair, yellow eyes, and claws, but does not exhibit facial markings in his half-breed form, or pointed humanoid ears, instead he has a unique pair of furry silver dog ears on top his head. As a dog demon, Inuyasha has claws he uses to fight with, utilized mainly in his Sankon Tessō (散魂鉄爪, "Iron Reaver Soul Stealer" in English) attack. Although a half-breed, a hanyō, Inuyasha's strong demon heritage inherited from his father affords him supernatural physical attributes and resilience; he possesses raw strength as well as speed and reflexes considerably superior to that of all lower-level and the majority of middle or even higher-level yōkai. His physical prowess combined with willpower and swordsmanship allows him to challenge even the stronger higher-level yōkai. His durability and regenerative abilities are similar to those of yōkai and allow him to endure severe pain and recover quickly from wounds as well as extending his lifespan by hundreds of years. The disadvantage of his demon blood (at least when he does not possess Tessaiga) is that it overtakes his human soul in near-death situations, making him stronger but also causing him to turn into a mindless killing machine, making him just as dangerous to friends as enemies. Although the usual way to reverse the transformation is to give Inuyasha Tessaiga and wait for him to calm down, Kagome's purifying abilities have also been shown to clear Inuyasha's mind when she touches him.

Due to his half-breed blood, Inuyasha temporarily loses all his demon traits and powers on the night of a new moon, effectively becoming completely human. Early in the series, Inuyasha acquires Tessaiga (鉄砕牙; "Steel-Cleaving Fang"), a powerful sword made from a fang of his father that can absorb demonic powers and energy. This proves to be useful to keep Inuyasha from falling victim to demonic nature turning him into a berserker. Over the course of the series, Inuyasha develops Tessaiga's signature Wind Scar (風の傷, Kaze no Kizu), Backlash Wave (爆流破, Bakuryūha) and Adamant Barrage (金剛槍破, Kongōsōha; Adamant Destroying Spears) Spears of Adamant techniques. Eventually, Inuyasha gains a new ability from the sword Dakki to become the Dragon-scaled and have the Vortex of Demonic Energy (妖穴, Yōketsu) to absorb the demon vortex, and in Meido Zangetsuha (冥道残月破, Meidō Zangetsuha; "Dark Path of the Dawn Moon's Wave) that Sesshōmaru prepared for him as part of their father's design.

== Background ==
Born to a dog-demon father and a human mother, Inuyasha is a dog demon/human hybrid who initially wanted to use the enormous power of the Shikon Jewel to become a full-fledged demon. Inuyasha lived with his mother Izayoi when he was a child. After his father died saving Inuyasha and Izayoi, the two lived together; however, the circumstances of Inuyasha's youth and any details of how long his mother was alive for or what happened to her is never revealed, but he was shown to have had an isolated childhood, shunned by humans for his demon blood. After the death of his mother when he was a child, Inuyasha grew up isolated and alone, having to deal with demons' and humans' hatred toward him and hardship.

Inuyasha met and fell in love with the priestess Kikyō, who was tasked with protecting the Shikon no Tama (Sacred Jewel), a powerful jewel that could grant a wish and that Inuyasha believed could make him a full demon. Through interacting with Kikyō, who was also living a lonely and isolated life, Inuyasha relinquished his dream of being a full demon and instead he and Kikyō planned for him to use the Shikon Jewel to become a human so that he could live with her. However, the jealous Naraku, who lusted after Kikyō and the jewel, manipulated them into believing they had been betrayed by one another. Before Kikyō died, she shot Inuyasha with a sealing arrow that bound him to the Sacred Tree. Inuyasha remained there for 50 years, until Kagome Higurashi pulled out the arrow, breaking the seal. When the Shikon Jewel, which had previously been embedded in Kagome's body, is shattered into fragments that scatter across feudal Japan, Inuyasha and Kagome travel together to retrieve the shards with Inuyasha once again seeking it to turn into a full-fledged demon. While Inuyasha initially sees Kagome as merely a tool with which to retrieve the shards of the jewel, Inuyasha and Kagome grow closer over time and he begins to fall in love with her. Others such as the fox demon Shippō and the rambunctious monk Miroku as well as Sango the demon slayer, later join the duo in their quest. Inuyasha eventually discovers that the events surrounding Kikyō's death were a result of Naraku tricking him and Kikyō, forcing them to turn against each other. Inuyasha's quest changes over time from looking for the Shikon Jewel shards to trying to defeat Naraku. In the end, three years after Naraku's death, he reunited with Kagome after the Bone-Eater's Well was reconnected and married her.

== Reception ==
Inuyasha has been popular within Japanese fans. In the Newtype magazine from August 2001, he was voted as the second best male character losing to Spike Spiegel from Cowboy Bebop. In 2002, Inuyasha won the Animage Anime Grand Prix for Best Male Character. In the next year, he was third behind Kira Yamato and Athrun Zala both from Mobile Suit Gundam SEED. He was sixth in the following poll. A 2019 NHK poll of 210,061 people saw Inuyasha voted the favorite character from all of Rumiko Takahashi's works.

Critical reception has been mixed. Derrick L. Tucker of THEM Anime Reviews praised the characterization of Inuyasha and other main characters, identifying it as a key reason why story elements such as the love triangle between Inuyasha, Kikyo and Kagome are able to evoke significant audience emotional response. In a review of the second manga volume, Megan Lavey from Mania Beyond Entertainment commented that the character's development was depicted for the first time as the story began to explore why Inuyasha is often angry and has difficulty trusting others. Inuyasha and Kagome were praised by Mania writer Chris Beveridge for how well they act together in contrast to the leads of Ranma ½. Writing later for the Fandom Post, Beveridge explained how it was fun seeing Inuyasha in the modern world and the impact it has on Kagome. Similarly, Holly Ellingwood from Active Anime particularly enjoyed the comedy that occurs when Inuyasha visits the modern world following Kagome. Despite noting how several characters had similar faces, Anime News Network's Zac Bertschy noted that Inuyasha stood out thanks to his clothes. Anime News Network felt the character became a less interesting anti-hero as the plot progressed and criticized the handling of his dynamic with Kagome due to the repetitive romantic tension despite both often arguing. John Sinnott from DVD Talk noted how examined was Inuyasha including his heritage and use of his sword that could create a big impact.

Briana Lawerence from Mania Entertainment was harsher in regards to these situation as the narrative continuously focused on this triangle for multiple seasons, leaving her the desire for Inuyasha to decide a love interest because she found the character annoying as a result. In her book Anime from Akira to Howl's Moving Castle, scholar Susan J. Napier analyzed how certain lessons in the series relate to Inuyasha's representation of masculinity. Academic Caroline Ruddell analyzed use of movement in the anime. In combat scenes Inuyasha is often slowed or frozen, against the moving background, to foreground his emotional and physical vulnerability. Close-up shots of his face and head place further focus on these aspects and on the character (rather than the narrative), particularly his facial expressions, while wide shots showing his whole body are used to depict his strength. Together, the techniques show the different facets of his hybrid nature. According to Rudell, Inuyasha is stylized as an anti-hero or tsundere. IGN's D. F. Smith praised the voice acting of Richard Cox as "he does a fine job getting the character's rough-edged, angry mode of speech across, even without being able to stick "yarou" at the end of every sentence." Anime News Network also found Cox as the most appealing members from the English dub, describing his take on the protagonist as "arrogant punk".
