= Maris the Chojo =

Manga

- Cover from the VHS release of Maris the Chojo original video animation

ザ・超女
- Genre: Comedy
- Manga
- Written by: Rumiko Takahashi
- Published by: Shogakukan
- English publisher: NA: Viz Media
- Magazine: Shōnen Sunday Zōkan
- Published: October 1980
- Original video animation
- Directed by: Motosuke Takahashi
- Produced by: Yuji Nunokawa; Kazu Tachibara; Ren Usami
- Written by: Tomoko Konparu; Hideo Takayashiki
- Music by: Ichirō Nitta
- Studio: Studio Pierrot
- Licensed by: NA: Central Park Media; UK: Manga Entertainment
- Released: May 21, 1986
- Runtime: 50 minutes

Maris the Chojo (ザ・超女(スーパーギャル), Za Sūpāgyaru; "The Supergal"), originally titled Supergal in U.S. markets, is a one shot manga story by Rumiko Takahashi. It ran in the October 1980 special edition of Shōnen Sunday and was later made into an anime OVA. The manga was later compiled in the Rumic World collection, which is available in English from Viz Media.

In North America, it was released on VHS and laserdisc by Central Park Media under the Rumik World series (which also included OVAs Laughing Target, Fire Tripper, and Mermaid Forest). It was originally released under the title "Supergal", but this was changed to Maris the Chojo to avoid potential trademark issues with Warner Bros.

== Summary ==
Maris doesn't exactly have the greatest life. Her father's an alcoholic, her mother's an airhead, and to top it off, she's always broke. Why? Maris is a Thanatosian, and Thanatosians have six times the strength of a normal human being. Generally, this would not be a bad thing, except that the planet Thanatos blew up years ago, and the rest of the galaxy is not set up for people who are six times as strong as everyone else.

So to keep the destruction her race does to a minimum, Thanatosians are made to wear harnesses that limit their strength. However, Maris accidentally destroys everything she touches and as all damages are docked from her wages, every mission she's assigned to by the Inter-Galactic Space Patrol takes her further in debt.

Traveling with Maris is Murphy, from a kitsune-like race. He can create nine copies of anything he wants with his tail and is forever teasing Maris.

However, things may be looking up. Koganemaru, the son of an intergalactic billionaire has been kidnapped. This may be the chance that Maris needed to become financially independent, as she figures that he'll be so indebted to her that he might ask for her hand in her marriage.

There's just one tiny (well, large) problem. The kidnapper is Sue, an opponent of Maris from her days as a wrestler, and she's out for revenge. After causing Maris to crash, she heads back to her highly adored base, where she meets her fellow kidnapper.

When Maris catches up again in an even more broken-down rocketship, she and Sue engage in a wrestling match to the death, made all the more difficult by Maris having a remote-controlled chip on her that prevents her from removing her harness, leaving Maris at Sue's mercy. With Murphy's help, she gets free, and destroys Sue's base.

At the end, it is revealed that Sue's fellow kidnapper is Koganemaru, who was bored and decided to try being evil. Sadly for Maris, he chooses to comfort Sue, and even proposes to her. Naturally, Maris is furious, and the story ends as she is destroying her ship, while being restrained by Murphy.

== Characters ==
- Maris (マリス), Voiced by: Mami Koyama
- Murphy (マーフィ), Voiced by: Jōji Yanami
- Sue (スー), Voiced by: Sumi Shimamoto
- Koganemaru (黄金丸), Voiced by: Toshio Furukawa

== Production staff ==
- Directors: Kazuyoshi Katayama, Motosuke Takahashi
- Writers: Tomoko Konparu, Hideo Takayashiki
- Music: Ichirō Nitta
- Director of Photography: Hirokata Takahashi
- Art Director: Torao Arai
- Character Designer: Katsumi Aoshima
- Animation Director: Motosuke Takahashi
- Producers: Yūji Nunokawa, Hajime Tachihara, Ren Usami

== Reception ==
On Anime News Network, Justin Sevakis said the anime was "once-hilarious [but] is now quite boring and predictable".
