= Fire Tripper =

Manga and anime OVA

- Cover art from the VHS release of Fire Tripper original video animation

炎トリッパー (Faiā Torippā)
- Genre: Romance
- Manga
- Written by: Rumiko Takahashi
- Published by: Shogakukan
- English publisher: NA: Viz Media
- Magazine: Shōnen Sunday Zōkan
- Published: August 1983
- Original video animation
- Directed by: Motosuke Takahashi
- Produced by: Yuji Nunokawa
- Written by: Tomoko Konparu
- Music by: Keiichi Oku
- Studio: Studio Pierrot
- Licensed by: NA: Central Park Media; UK: Manga Entertainment
- Released: December 16, 1985
- Runtime: 50 minutes

Fire Tripper (炎トリッパー, Faiā Torippā; literally meaning "Fire Tripper") is a Japanese manga by Rumiko Takahashi published in August 1983 issue of Shōnen Sunday Zōkan, a tankobon version was released in 1986. The manga was later compiled in Rumic World books, which are available in English from Viz Media. It was adapted into an anime OVA, but was also released in theaters in double bill with Shin'ichi Masaki's OVA The Humanoid. In North America, this was released on VHS by Central Park Media under the Rumik World series (which also included OVAs Laughing Target, Maris the Chojo, and Mermaid Forest).

== Plot ==
The main character of the series is Suzuko, a normal Japanese school girl from modern times, but has a strange memory of being trapped in a burning house when she was little. One day, as she is walking home Shūhei, her neighbour's child who has recently had his appendix removed, a huge gas explosion occurs.

When Suzuko wakes up, she finds herself in a post-battlefield, in civil war era Japan, with dead bodies all around her. Some men find her in the field, and attempt to rape her.

However, a young man named Shukumaru comes to Suzuko's rescue. After Suzuko is saved, Shukumaru takes Suzuko back to his village. He's the village thief/protector. Upon their arrival there, Shukumaru gives his little sister, named Suzu, a bell. He also claims he will marry Suzuko.

Shukumaru tells Suzuko that she needs to change her clothes, and at this point, Suzuko comes across Shūhei's shirt. She then realizes that Shūhei must have traveled back in time with her. She tries to find him, but can not locate him.

The villagers tease Shukumaru over his not having bedded Suzuko yet, and he is terribly offended. One night, he gets drunk and goes to Suzuko's hut, but all he does is fall asleep.

Suzuko soon realizes that she is in fact the little girl in the village named Suzu, and that she was born in Shukumaru's time. She is very worried about this, as she has fallen in love with Shukumaru, and cannot marry him if they are siblings. When the village is burnt, she sees her past self disappear to the future, where she will be adopted and raised as a modern girl.

Shortly after this, Akauma, the leader of the invaders attacks Shukumaru, and Suzuko saves him by disappearing to the future, where she realizes that fire allows her to travel through time, and that is how she survived the house fire she remembers being in when she was little, and how she got to modern times.

When back in modern times, Suzuko takes Shukumaru home to take care of his wounds and notices he has a scar on his stomach that is exactly like Shūhei's appendix scar. Suzuko realizes that Shukumaru is Shūhei, and he must have been separated from her in mid-time switch earlier. Shukumaru is Shūhei from the present, and he had been found and raised in the past all along, thus he is not her biological brother. Suzuko doesn't feel guilty about what happened to Shukumaru, however, when he tells her how much he's enjoyed his life in the past. From there, Suzuko and Shukumaru use the same gas explosion that sent them back in time once before to travel back to Shukumaru's era again, and the story ends as Shukumaru announces they have a wedding to attend to.

== Voice cast ==
- Sumi Shimamoto: Suzuko/Suzu
- Yū Mizushima: Shukumaru
- Mayumi Tanaka: Shūhei
- Tesshō Genda: Akauma

== Production staff ==
- Director/Animation Director: Motosuke Takahashi
- Writer: Tomoko Konparu
- Music: Kōichi Oku
- Director of Photography: Masaaki Fujita
- Sound Director: Shigeharu Shiba
- Art Director: Torao Arai
- Character Designer: Katsumi Aoshima
- Producers: Yūji Nunokawa, Hajime Tachihara
