= Motosuke Takahashi =

Anime director (1941–2007)

- Born: 高橋 資祐; January 11, 1941; Ishinomaki, Miyagi Prefecture, Japan
- Died: November 8, 2007 (aged 66); Japan
- Occupations: Animation director Animator; Character designer Director; Storyboard artist
- Years active: 1967–2007

Motosuke Takahashi (高橋 資祐, Takahashi Motosuke; January 11, 1941 – November 8, 2007) was a Japanese animation director, animator, storyboard artist, and character designer. He died of lung cancer on November 8, 2007.

== Works ==
=== Anime series ===
1960s – 1970s

- Oraa Guzura Dado (1967–1968, key animation)
- The Adventures of Hutch the Honeybee (1970–1971, key animation)
- Inakappe Taishō (1970–1972, episode director)
- Mokku of the Oak Tree (1972, episode director)
- Science Ninja Team Gatchaman (1972–1974, key animation)
- Demetan Croaker, The Boy Frog (1973, episode director)
- New Honeybee Hutch (1974, episode director)
- Hurricane Polymar (1974–1975, episode director, key animation)
- Tentōmushi no Uta (1974–1976, episode director)
- The Adventures of Pepero (1975–1976, episode director)
- Maya the Honey Bee (1975–1976, storyboards)
- Blocker Gundan 4 Machine Blaster (1976–1977, character designer)
- Combattler V (1976–77)
- Chōgattai Majutsu Robo Gingaizer (1977, character designer, animation director)
- Angie Girl (1977–1978, character designer, animation director)
- Chō Super Car Gattiger (1977–1978, chief director, episode director)
- Gatchaman II (1978–1979, episode director)
- Tōshō Daimos (1978–1979, animation director)
- Uchū Majin Daikengō (1978–1979, character designer, animation director)
- Daltanius (1979-1980, storyboards)
- The Ultraman (1979–1980, storyboards)

1980s

- The Wonderful Adventures of Nils (1980-1981, episode director, key animation)
- Trider G7 (1980–1981, storyboards)
- Belle and Sebastian (1981-1982, animation director, storyboards)
- Saikyō Robo Daiōja (1981-1982, episode director)
- Yattodetaman (1981–1982, opening animation)
- Urusei Yatsura (1981-1986, episode director, animation director, storyboards)
- The Mysterious Cities of Gold (1982–1983, storyboards)
- The New Adventures of Maya the Honeybee (1982–1983, storyboards)
- Armored Trooper Votoms (1983–1984, storyboards)
- Creamy Mami, the Magic Angel (1983-1984, key animation, storyboards)
- Bismark (1984–1985, animation director, storyboards)
- Osomatsu-kun (1988-1989, animation director, storyboards)
- Madō King Granzort (1989–1990, storyboards)

1990s

- Heisei Tensai Bakabon (1990, animation director, storyboards)
- Ore wa Chokkaku (1991, animation director, storyboards)
- Marude Dameo (1991-1992, animation director, storyboards)
- Mama wa Shōgaku 4 Nensei (1992, storyboards)
- YuYu Hakusho (1992–1995, animation director, storyboards)
- Ninku (1995-1996, animation director, storyboards)
- Midori no Makibaō (1996–1997, animation director, storyboards)
- Flame of Recca (1997-1998, animation director, storyboards)
- Takoyaki Mantoman (1998–1999, animation director, storyboards)

2000s

- Tokyo Mew Mew (2000-2003, animation director, storyboards)
- Detective School Q (2003–2004, animation director, storyboards)
- Bleach (2004–2007, animation director, storyboards, sub-character design)

=== OVAs ===
- Cosmo Police Justy (1985, director, animation director)
- Fire Tripper (1985, director, animation director)
- Maris the Chojo (1986, director)
- Laughing Target (1987, director, animation director
- Harbor Light Story Fashion Lala yori (1988, director, animation director)

=== Anime films ===
- Mysterious Thief Lupin: The Riddle of 813 (1979, storyboards)
- Macross: Do You Remember Love? (1984, key animation)
- Project A-ko (1986, animation)
- Aitsu to Lullaby: Suiyōbi no Cinderella (1987, director)
- Bleach: The DiamondDust Rebellion (2007, died during production)

=== Other works ===
- The Irresponsible Captain Tylor Music Clip (1994, character designer, key animation, storyboards)
