= Mermaid Saga =

Japanese manga series and its adaptations

- First shinsōban volume cover

人魚シリーズ (Ningyo Shirīzu)
- Genre: Horror fantasy; Romance; Supernatural
- Manga
- Written by: Rumiko Takahashi
- Published by: Shogakukan
- English publisher: NA: Viz Media
- Imprint: Shōnen Sunday Comics Special
- Magazine: Shōnen Sunday Zōkan; (1984–1985); Weekly Shōnen Sunday; (1987–1994)
- English magazine: NA: Animerica (some chapters)
- Original run: August 1984 – February 1994
- Volumes: 3
- Original video animation

Mermaid's Forest
- Directed by: Takaya Mizutani
- Music by: Kenji Kawai
- Studio: Pastel
- Licensed by: NA: Central Park Media
- Released: August 16, 1991
- Runtime: 55 minutes
- Original video animation

Mermaid's Scar
- Directed by: Morio Asaka
- Produced by: Ayao Ueda; Shirō Sasaki
- Music by: Norihiro Tsuru
- Studio: Madhouse
- Licensed by: NA: Central Park Media
- Released: September 24, 1993
- Runtime: 45 minutes
- Anime television series

Mermaid's Forest
- Directed by: Masaharu Okuwaki
- Studio: TMS Entertainment
- Licensed by: NA: Geneon
- Original network: TXN (TV Tokyo)
- Original run: October 4, 2003 – December 20, 2003
- Episodes: 11 + 2 OVA
- icon

Mermaid Saga (Japanese: 人魚シリーズ, Hepburn: Ningyo Shirīzu) is a Japanese manga series written and illustrated by Rumiko Takahashi. It consists of nine stories told in 16 chapters irregularly published in Shogakukan's Shōnen Sunday Zōkan and Weekly Shōnen Sunday from 1984 to 1994.

Two of the stories from the series, Mermaid's Forest and Mermaid's Scar, were adapted as original video animations (OVAs) in 1991 and 1993, respectively. All of the tales, except one, were later adapted as an anime television series in 2003. In North America, the manga has been licensed by Viz Media, while the first OVA was released by US Manga Corps in 1993 and the second OVA by Viz Media in 1995. The anime television series was licensed by Geneon Entertainment.

In 1989, Mermaid Saga received the 20th Seiun Award for the Best Comic.

== Plot ==
According to an ancient Japanese legend, anyone who consumes the flesh of a mermaid has a small chance of gaining immortality. However, there is a much greater chance that consumption will lead to death or transformation into a damned creature known as a Lost Soul ("Deformed Ones" in the English dub). Mermaid Saga tells the tale of Yuta, an immortal young man who has been alive for 500 years after eating mermaid flesh. Over the years, he is grown tired of eternal life and throughout the series, he wanders across Japan searching for a mermaid who may be able to turn him back into a normal human being. He encounters Mana, a young woman who is about to be sacrificed. She has been forced to eat mermaid flesh so that after she is killed, her flesh can be used to rejuvenate a village of ageing immortal women. Yuta rescues her and they travel on together while Yuta pursues his quest to become mortal again.

== Characters ==
Note: In some cases a character is portrayed by a different voice actor in the OVAs. These voice actors are also added.

=== Main characters ===
Yuta (湧太, Yūta)
Voiced by: Kōichi Yamadera (Japanese); Michael McGhee (Mermaid's Forest OVA); Justin Gross (1–3), Liam O'Brien (4–13) (Mermaid's Forest TV) (English)
A 500-year-old immortal born in 1480, Yuta gained eternal life after consuming mermaid flesh along with fellow fishermen—an act that killed or deformed his companions while sparing him. After centuries of normal life, his immortality becomes apparent when his wife ages while he remains unchanged. Believing another mermaid could reverse his condition, he embarks on an endless quest. During his travels, he rescues fifteen-year-old Mana from mermaids who transformed her into an immortal for cannibalistic purposes. The kind-hearted Yuta develops numerous connections with others affected by mermaid flesh throughout his centuries of existence.
Mana (真魚)
Voiced by: Minami Takayama (Japanese); Anne Marie Zola (Mermaid's Forest OVA); Karen Thompson (Mermaid's Forest TV) (English)
Mana, born in 1965, becomes Yuta's immortal companion after he rescues her from a group of mermaids. Held captive since childhood, the mermaids granted her immortality at age fifteen intending to consume her for rejuvenation. She develops deep loyalty to Yuta, frequently saving him during their travels. Though harboring romantic feelings for him, her naive nature prevents full understanding of these emotions. Their bond grows as they journey together, with Mana's devotion remaining steadfast despite her childlike perception of relationships.

=== Other characters ===
Masato (真人)

Voiced by: Yuuichi Harada (Mermaid's Scar), Makiko Ohmoto (Mermaid Forest TV) (Japanese); Christopher Turner (Mermaid's Scar), Erika Weinstein (Mermaid Forest TV) (English)

An 800-year-old immortal with a child's appearance, centuries of isolation have twisted him into a merciless figure. His first act was to feed his dying biological mother mermaid flesh, transforming her into a Lost Soul. Having repeatedly lost adoptive parents throughout history, he now manipulates new caregivers by giving them small doses of mermaid flesh. During World War II, he stole a Nambu pistol and assumed the identity of Masato, a war widow whose own son and husband were killed during the war. When Misa's transformation fails, he tries to replace her with his young nanny, Yukie, who also becomes a Lost Soul. Following a confrontation with Yuta and Mana that ends in a fatal car crash, his body remains undiscovered.
Misa (美沙)
Voiced by: Gara Takashima (Mermaid's Scar), Rei Sakuma (Mermaid Forest TV) (Japanese); Gina Grad (Mermaid Forest TV) (English)
A war widow who lost her family during World War II, she encounters the immortal Masato, who grants her longevity through mermaid flesh to serve as his mother figure. After eighty years of this forced relationship, her regenerative abilities weaken and Masato seeks a replacement. She ultimately perishes when attacked by Yukie, Masato's former nanny who had transformed into a Lost Soul. Her tragic story illustrates the destructive consequences of mermaid immortality, caught between an immortal child's emotional dependence and the flesh's inevitable deterioration.
Yukie (雪枝)
Voiced by: Kikuko Inoue (Mermaid's Scar), Chieko Honda (Mermaid Forest TV) (Japanese); Hunter MacKenzie Austin (Mermaid Forest TV) (English)
Yukie serves as Masato's devoted nanny, her nurturing nature making her an ideal candidate to replace Misa as his surrogate mother. Unaware of Masato's true nature, she consumes mermaid flesh at his urging but tragically transforms into a Lost Soul. Yuta intervenes and kills the monstrous Yukie, believing he is protecting both Masato and Misa from the threat she has become. Her transformation underscores the dangerous consequences of mermaid flesh consumption.
Rin (鱗)
Voiced by: Houko Kuwashima (Japanese); Lulu Chiang (English)
Rin, the teenage daughter of Toba Island's pirate leader, assumes command when her father falls ill. Seeking a mermaid's cure, she encounters Yuta after he resurrects from a fatal sea battle. The two develop a romantic relationship, and Yuta pledges to remain on the island if he regains mortality. However, unwilling to subject another mortal to his immortal existence, he ultimately departs. Rin continues leading the island's pirates, her story illustrating the painful divide between mortal and immortal lives.
Isago (砂)
Voiced by: Ai Orikasa (Japanese); Wendee Lee (English)
The wife of Sakagami Island's headman, Isago reveals the secret of mermaid immortality and urges her husband to seek one. Pregnant by her late husband (murdered by pirates three years prior), she requires mermaid flesh to ensure a healthy birth—being a land-dwelling mermaid herself. She explains to Rin that terrestrial mermaids consume aquatic mermaids, particularly during pregnancy. After obtaining the flesh, Isago returns to the sea, reverts to her true mermaid form, and successfully delivers twin merbabies. Her story exposes the complex hierarchy and reproductive biology of mermaids.
Towa Kannagi (神無木 登和, Kannagi Towa)
Voiced by: Mika Doi (Mermaid Forest OVA), Sumi Shimamoto (Mermaid Forest TV) (Japanese); Kata Sheridan (Mermaid Forest OVA), Erica Shaffer (Mermaid Forest OVA (English)
Afflicted by a terminal childhood illness, Towa is cured when her twin sister Sawa administers mermaid blood—though this transforms her hair white and deforms one arm. Confined due to her disfigurement, she endures chronic pain until her fiancé, Dr. Shiina, begins transplanting arms from deceased girls, though each eventually degenerates. Following their father's death, freed Towa attempts to force mermaid flesh on Sawa as vengeance, but Sawa dies from a heart attack before consuming it. Denied retribution, Towa commits suicide, demanding the destruction of Mermaid Hill and all its cursed relics.
Sawa Kannagi (神無木 佐和, Kannagi Sawa)
Voiced by: Aiko Konoshima (Mermaid Forest OVA); Hisako Kyōda, Haruna Ikezawa (young) (Mermaid Forest TV) (Japanese); Susie Westerby (Mermaid Forest OVA), Hunter MacKenzie Austin (young) (Mermaid Forest TV) (English)
Sawa, Towa's identical twin, inherits guardianship of Mermaid Hill and its cache of mermaid flesh. Her desperate attempt to save Towa's life with mermaid blood results in her sister's disfigurement and imprisonment. After losing her husband in World War II and subsequently her child and father, the lonely Sawa guards the secret location until Towa threatens Mana's life. When Towa attempts to force mermaid flesh upon her as vengeance, Sawa unexpectedly succumbs to cardiac arrest before consuming it. Her death denies Towa retribution while underscoring the tragic consequences surrounding mermaid immortality.
Dr. Shiina (椎名, Shiina)
Voiced by: Ryūji Saikachi; Kazumi Tanaka (young) (Mermaid Forest OVA); Eisuke Yoda, Kōzō Mito (young) (Mermaid Forest TV) (Japanese); Bob Foster (Mermaid Forest OVA), Michael Forest, Patrick Seitz (young) (Mermaid Forest TV) (English)
Shiina, Towa Kannagi's devoted fiancé, repeatedly implores her to abandon Mermaid Hill, but she consistently refuses. As a physician, he reluctantly performs gruesome arm transplants to alleviate her suffering from mermaid-induced deformities. He reveals to Yuta and Mana how Towa became consumed by her twin sister Sawa's existence. In the OVA, when Towa immolates herself in Mermaid Hill's flames, Shiina follows her to a fiery death, symbolically reclaiming their lost fifty-five years together. His tragic arc underscores the destructive power of mermaid-related obsessions.
Big Eyes (大眼, Ōmanako)
Voiced by: Daisuke Gōri (Japanese); Kyle Hebert (English)
A desperate man consumes mermaid flesh from a beached corpse, seeking immortality. Upon awakening, he discovers his village destroyed and family slain, unaware he committed the atrocities himself. The incomplete transformation leaves him partially a Lost Soul—retaining speech and emotion but with grotesquely swollen eyes, earning the nickname "Big Eyes." While Mana pities his tragic state, Yuta and a local hunter are forced to kill him when his violent impulses persist.
Natsume (なつめ)
Voiced by: Kazuko Sugiyama (Japanese); Monica Rial (English)
During the Warring States period, a grieving father's daughter, Natsume, is resurrected through an ancient Buddhist ritual called "Hangon", which uses mermaid liver to grant immortality. Over time, the liver's influence drives her to consume animal and human livers. Decades later, Yuta encounters Natsume and the monk who now seeks to kill her to end the curse. Though she wishes to join Yuta, her possessive father attacks him, allowing the monk to extract her liver. Natsume saves Yuta before her father leaps off a cliff with her. Mortally wounded, she briefly revives to bid Yuta farewell before reverting to skeletal remains.
Nanao (七生)
Voiced by: Toshiko Fujita (Japanese); Chris Kent, Jay D. Stone (young) (English)
Yuta and Mana encounter Nanao, a wounded boy who escaped his kidnappers and miraculously heals after taking his "mother's" medicine. They return him home, only to discover his caretaker is actually his immortal grandmother, who—after consuming mermaid flesh 25 years earlier—kidnapped her own grandson to replace her now-grown son. When she attempts to feed Nanao mermaid flesh to make him immortal as well, Yuta intervenes. The revelation exposes the tragic consequences of mermaid immortality, as the grandmother's prolonged life drives her to unnatural acts of replacement and obsession.
Nanao's mother (七生の母, Nanao no haha)
Voiced by: Masako Katsuki (Japanese); Michelle Ruff (English)
After being abandoned by her husband and son in 1969 due to deteriorating mental health, the woman consumes mermaid flesh, gaining immortality at the cost of severe facial scarring and chronic pain. Decades later, she kidnaps her adult son's infant child, naming him Nanao after her lost son. To conceal her disfigurement, she wears the preserved face of a deceased woman when appearing in public. When attempting to force mermaid flesh on her grandson to create another immortal companion, Yuta intervenes. Fleeing the confrontation, she perishes in a storehouse fire, ending her tragic pursuit of familial replacement through unnatural means.
Nae Kogure (木暮 苗, Kogure Nae)
Voiced by: Yuri Amano (Japanese); Karen Strassman (English)
In the years preceding World War II, Nae befriends Yuta and reveals the secret of mermaid ashes brought by a nun to her village. She uses them to create the perpetual "red valley" flower field where their romance blossoms. Her jealous fiancé Eijiro murders her, then unsuccessfully attempts resurrection until later recovering the ashes. The revived Nae exists as a hollow shell until Yuta's return with Mana triggers fragmented memories. Eijiro fatally stabs her, and as the ashes' power fades, she dies again in the red valley. Her tragic story illustrates the imperfect nature of mermaid-based resurrection.
Eijiro (英二郎)
Voiced by: Tamio Ōki, Yasunori Matsumoto (young) (Japanese); Doug Stone, Travis Willingham (young) (English)
Eijiro, an ambitious young man engaged to wealthy Nae Kogure before World War II, grows consumed by jealousy when she falls for the immortal Yuta. In a fit of rage, he murders Nae upon suspecting she plans to leave with Yuta. Obsessed for decades, he eventually revives her using mermaid ashes, though she retains no memories. When an aged Yuta returns decades later to find Nae unchanged, her fleeting recollections trigger Eijiro's enduring envy. He fatally stabs her, demonstrating how mermaid resurrection cannot restore what time and obsession have destroyed. His actions underscore the tragic consequences of attempting to circumvent natural mortality.
Soukichi (翔キチ)
Voiced by: Minoru Inaba, Kyouko Tonguu (young) (Mermaid Forest TV) (Japanese); Michael McConnohie, Kirsty Pape (young) (Mermaid Forest TV) (English)
A long time ago, Soukichi was an errand boy from Nae's family. Many years later after Nae's disappearance, as an old man, he helps Yuta and Mana, believing that Eijiro kidnapped her.
Akiko Kiryu (鬼柳 晶子, Kiryū Akiko)
Akiko, the gentle sister of violent Shingo Kiryu, lives with lifelong guilt after accidentally blinding him during their childhood when attempting to stop his cruelty to animals. In desperation, she poisons them both with mermaid flesh – an act that leaves her in a comatose, doll-like state while granting Shingo immortality. He takes revenge by gouging out her eye. When Yuta ultimately confronts Shingo, he mercifully decapitates Akiko, ending her suspended animation. Her tragic story illustrates how mermaid immortality corrupts even familial bonds, transforming victims into permanent casualties of past trauma.
Shingo Kiryu (鬼柳 新吾, Kiryū Shingo)
Shingo Kiryu, Akiko's violently deranged brother, displays sadistic tendencies while living at Kiryu Manor before the Russo-Japanese War. After surviving Akiko's mermaid flesh poisoning attempt and his father's subsequent murder effort, he becomes immortal but is confined to the family basement. Upon release, he gouges out Akiko's eye in revenge. Each subsequent murder forces him to relive her final vision—his own monstrous visage attacking her. Believing her death will end these visions, he battles Yuta, who mercy-kills Akiko. When Yuta turns the blade on Shingo, the immortal realizes his eternal torment will persist and beheads himself in despair.
Ayu (アユ)
Voiced by: Yukari Honma (Japanese); Amy Kincaid (English)
Ayu is a girl in the mermaid village who took care of Mana. Ayu was next to sacrifice herself. Ayu is a mermaid, but died after spears pierced her body. Yuta found her body and showed it to the old women.
Mermaids (人魚, Ningyo)
The flesh of mermaids is reported to give eternal youth, regenerative self-healing properties, and longevity. It is also a poison which can cause death, deformity or cause the person to become a Lost Soul or monster. Mermaids mostly live beneath the sea and have a normal lifespan. However, some live on land and are immortal, but they must sometimes eat the flesh of an immortal human to rejuvenate themselves.

== Media ==
=== Manga ===
The stories of Mermaid Saga, written and illustrated by Rumiko Takahashi, were irregularly serialized in Shogakukan's Shōnen Sunday Zōkan and Weekly Shōnen Sunday from August 1984 to February 1994. In total there are nine stories told in 16 chapters. The first wideban volume released by Shogakukan was Mermaid's Forest, named after the third story within it and published on April 25, 1988. The second wideban, Mermaid's Scar, was released on December 19, 1992, without two stories (four chapters): "Eye of the Demon" and "The Last Face". These stories were not yet released when the book came out. The series was re-released in shinsōban format in 2003, in three volumes with all the stories.

In North America, Mermaid Forest began serialization by Viz Media in Animerica's first issue in November 1992. Rachel Matt Thorn provided the translation. It was published in the first nine issues, and then the rest was published in the comic book format from December 1993 to September 1995. The manga was later released in three graphic novel volumes, Mermaid Forest, Mermaid's Scar and Mermaid's Gaze, from November 1, 1994, to March 8, 1997. In 2004, it was released in four books, simply titled Mermaid Saga, from July 14 to December 22, 2004. In February 2020, Viz Media announced a 2-volume new edition of the manga, Mermaid Saga Collector's Edition. The first volume was published on November 17, 2020, and the second was published on February 16, 2021.

In a 2009 interview, Takahashi stated that she does not consider the series completed and plans to revisit it at some point in the future.

=== Volumes ===
==== First Japanese edition ====
No.	Japanese release date	Japanese ISBN
1	April 25, 1988	4-09-121854-7
Chapters 1–6
2	December 19, 1992	4-09-121855-5
Chapters 7–12

==== First English edition/Second Japanese edition ====
No.	Title	Original release date	Japanese release date
1	Mermaid Forest	November 1, 1994; 978-1569310472	October 18, 2003; 4-09-121854-7
1. "A Mermaid Never Smiles (1)" (人魚は笑わない［前編］, Ningyo wa Warawanai Zenpen); 2. "A Mermaid Never Smiles (2)" (人魚は笑わない［後編］, Ningyo wa Warawanai Kōhen); 3. "The Village of Fighting Fish (1)" (闘魚の里［前編］, Tōgyo no Sato Zenpen); 4. "The Village of Fighting Fish (2)" (闘魚の里［後編］, Tōgyo no Sato Kōhen); 5. "Mermaid Forest (1)" (人魚の森［前編］, Ningyo no Mori Zenpen); 6. "Mermaid Forest (2)" (人魚の森［後編］, Ningyo no Mori Kōhen)
2	Mermaid's Scar	February 5, 1996; 978-1569310830	November 18, 2003; 4-09-127742-X
7. "Dream's End" (夢の終わり, Yume no Owari) (Note: "Mermaid's Dream" in English release.); 8. "Promised Tomorrow (1)" (約束の明日［前編］, Yakusoku no Ashita Zenpen) (Note: "Mermaid's Promise" in English release.); 9. "Promised Tomorrow (2)" (約束の明日［後編］, Yakusoku no Ashita Kōhen); 10. "Mermaid's Scar (1)" (人魚の傷［前編］, Ningyo no Kizu Zenpen); 11. "Mermaid's Scar (2)" (人魚の傷［後編］, Ningyo no Kizu Kōhen)
3	Mermaid's Gaze	March 8, 1997; 978-1569311950	December 18, 2003; 4-09-127743-8
12. "The Ash Princess" (舎利姫, Shari-Hime); 13. "Eye of the Demon (1)" (夜叉の瞳［前］, Yasha no Hitomi Mae) (Note: "Mermaid's Gaze" in English release.); 14. "Eye of the Demon (2)" (夜叉の瞳［後編］, Yasha no Hitomi Kōhen); 15. "The Last Face (1)" (最後の顔［前］, Saigo no Kao Mae) (Note: "Mermaid's Mask" in English release.); 16. "The Last Face (2)" (最後の顔［後編］, Saigo no Kao Kōhen)

==== Second English edition ====
No.	English release date	English ISBN
1	July 14, 2004	978-1591163367
Chapters 1–6
2	September 21, 2004	978-1591164845
Chapters 7–9
3	November 30, 2004	978-1591164838
Chapters 10–12
4	December 22, 2004	978-1591164821
Chapters 13–16

==== Third English edition ====
No.	English release date	English ISBN
1	November 17, 2020	978-1-9747-1857-3
Chapters 1–9
2	February 16, 2021	978-1-9747-1859-7
Chapters 10–16

=== Anime ===
==== Original video animations ====
The first original video animation (OVA), Mermaid Forest, by studio Pastel, was released in Japan in August 1991. A subtitled Laserdisc and VHS tape were released in North America by US Manga Corps on March 3, 1993. It was marketed as one of the Rumic World anime (along with Maris the Chojo, Fire Tripper, and Laughing Target).

The second OVA, Mermaid's Scar, made by Madhouse, was released in Japan on VHS and Laserdisc on September 24, 1993. Viz Media published a dubbed release on VHS on November 21, 1995.

==== Anime television series ====
In 2003, the animation company Tokyo Movie Shinsha produced a 13-episode TV series based on Mermaid Saga as part of the Rumic Theater series and it was broadcast on TV Tokyo from October 4 to December 20, 2003. All but the Eye of the Demon two-parter were animated. While closely following the story of the original manga (more so than the OVA versions), many of the violent aspects of the stories were toned down. Only eleven episodes were shown on Japanese TV, with the final two episodes (Mermaid's Scar) released direct to video, allegedly because this particular story was too violent for TV. It was released in North America by Geneon.

===== Episodes =====
No.	Title	Original release date
1	"Mermaid Does Not Smile" "Ningyo wa Waranai" (人魚は笑わない)	October 4, 2003
In a mountain village from Setouchi region, Mana has just turned fifteen. She is cared for and pampered by Baba, (Note: Nanny in the English dub version) an old woman who keeps her shackled in bed. The village is inhabited by identical old and young women who are all mermaids in human form. Meanwhile, Yuta, a young man arrives, looking for a mermaid. He is actually a 500 year old immortal human who became so after eating mermaid flesh. One of the women is chosen by the others to become a mermaid by entering the ocean and she is then sacrificed. Baba feeds her flesh to Mana to make her an immortal human whose flesh will rejuvenate the old women. Yuta learns of their plan and escapes with Mana after explaining her fate. The women try to stop Yuta and Mana from escaping, but they are caught in flooding sea water and revert to their mermaid forms. Baba, who is an immortal human, not a mermaid, decides to stay with the mermaids who are unable to take human form again. As Yuta leaves with Mana, he tells her that life as an immortal is not all bad, although he still hopes to become mortal again.
2	"Village of the Fighting Fish (Part I)" "Tōgyo no Sato (Zenpen)" (闘魚の里(前編))	October 11, 2003
In a flashback, Yuta recalls meeting Rin, the daughter of the pirate chief of Toba island. Rin's father was gravely ill, so Rin led raiding parties on passing ships, demanding a tenth of their cargo as a toll and sparing the crews. Rin buried Yuta after his body washed ashore following a violent storm. However, Yuta revived and explained that he drowned while mermaid hunting on behalf of Isago, the wife of the Sakagami Island chief who were rivals to Toba Islanders. Isago convinced the chief to use his men to hunt mermaids and Yuta was hired with some other men in a nearby port for the hunt. For a time, Yuta lived and worked with the Toba islanders. One day, Isago saw Yuta and Rin in port. Surprised to see Yuta alive, Isago realized that he was immortal and believed he had access to mermaid flesh. Isago followed them back to Toba and stabbed Rin's father in an attempt to force Yuta into revealing the location of mermaid flesh and stop him from dying. In angry retaliation, Rin slew Isago.
3	"Village of the Fighting Fish (Part II)" "Tōgyo no Sato (Kōhen)" (闘魚の里(後編))	October 18, 2003
Yuta's recollections of his past continue. Yuta and Rin took a fishing boat and captured a mermaid to save Rin's father. However, the Sakagami islanders followed them and after killing both the mermaid and Yuta, they took Rin to Sakagami. When Rin saw Isago there alive, she realized that Isago was immortal. Isago revealed that she has been pregnant for three years by her previous husband, whom the Sakagami islanders killed. She needed mermaid flesh so she could finally give birth. Meanwhile, Yuta revived and returned to save Rin. The chief and his men alternately fought Yuta and Rin while they ate the mermaid flesh. However, many were poisoned by the mermaid flesh and the survivors, including the chief, became Deformed Ones. Isago told the chief that she too was a mermaid and leaped off a cliff into the ocean. Yuta and Rin thought Isago did so in desperation, but Isago changed into her mermaid form and swam away, trailed by two smaller forms. On Toba, Rin's father recovers from his wound without eating mermaid flesh. Back in the present, Mana asks Yuta how far does the ocean go.
4	"Mermaid Forest (Part I)" "Ningyo no Mori (Zenpen)" (人魚の森(前編))	October 25, 2003
Mana is accidentally killed by a truck when she runs onto the road. Old Doctor Shiina tells the police and Yuta that she survived and wandered away, however he takes her corpse to the house of an old woman named Sawa who lives with a young woman called Towa. Shiina prepares to remove Mana's forearm to replace the deformed arm of Towa, but as he begins, Mana revives. Yuta realizes that Shiina lied and tracks him to Sawa's house in Mermaid's Forest, where local legend says a mermaid is buried. Towa commands a Deformed dog to attack and kill Yuta. When Yuta revives, he finds himself chained in a cell in the basement. Towa kills Mana, planning to have Shiina transplant her head onto Mana's body. Meanwhile, Sawa frees Yuta and reveals that she and Towa are identical twins, but when they were young, Sawa gave Towa medicine made of mermaid blood to save her from a terminal illness. The medicine made her ageless, but turned her hand into a Deformed claw and her hair white. Rather than admit his daughter was partially Deformed, their father had told everyone that Towa had died and confined her to the cell in the basement until his death.
5	"Mermaid Forest (Part II)" "Ningyo no Mori (Kōhen)" (人魚の森(後編))	November 1, 2003
To save Mana's life, Sawa takes Towa to the mermaid's tomb. Yuta follows and warns Towa that eating mermaid flesh may completely transform her into a Deformed One. Towa says immortality or transformation makes no difference, and tries to force Sawa to eat a piece of mermaid flesh. She explains that when they were young, Sawa desired immortality, but was too afraid to try it herself and experimented on Towa, her identical twin. Towa developed a Deformed hand and remained eternally youthful instead. While Towa was forced to live in confinement, Sawa lived a full life, marrying and having a child. Towa tries to make Sawa eat the mermaid flesh, to become immortal as an old woman or a monster, however Sawa dies of a heart attack, denying Towa her revenge. Towa instructs the others to burn the tomb, the house, and everything in them, including herself. As they watch the fire burn, Shiina reveals that he had tried to convince Towa to elope with him when he was young, but Towa refused, remaining to exact revenge on her sister. Later, Mana reassures Yuta that if they were separated, she would eternally search for him.
6	"The End of the Dream" "Yume no Owari" (夢の終わり)	November 8, 2003
Yuta and Mana fall off a cliff while chasing a butterfly and both die. A heavily bandaged man, called Big Eyes by nearby villagers, carries Mana to his cave. An old hunter from the village finds Yuta, but Yuta revives during his burial rites. Big Eyes tells Mana that 40 years earlier he lived in a fishing village and ate mermaid flesh. He blacked out, and upon regaining his senses, discovered everyone in his village had been killed. He ran into the mountains and lived alone ever since. Yuta and the hunter find Big Eyes who flees deep into the cave with Mana. There, Mana stumbles upon the skeletons of villagers that Big Eyes has eaten and Big Eyes explains that he still blacks out. The hunter shoots Big Eyes who goes berserk and runs away. Yuta catches and kills Big Eyes. Later, Mana ponders that there are all sorts of Deformed Ones, all sorts of mermaids, and all sorts of Yutas.
7	"Bone Princess" "Sharihime" (舎利姫)	November 15, 2003
While fishing with Mana, Yuta has a flashback to 1600, the first year of the Tokugawa shogunate, when he was 120 years old. He recalls an apparently 12-year-old immortal girl called Natsume who works with an old man, whom she calls Pa, who purports to sell mermaid flesh, but it is only fish. An itinerant monk attempts to kill Natsume and cuts off her left arm. Yuta rescues Natsume and carries her back to Pa, who reattaches her severed arm. Later, the monk tells Yuta that after Natsume died, he used a piece of mermaid liver to resurrect her for Pa. The monk has decided to end Natsume's existence because of her need to eat fresh liver to survive, but Pa escapes with her. Yuta doubts destroying Natsume is the right thing to do and offers to take her with him, but the monk attacks Natsume and removes the mermaid liver. When Pa sees what the monk has done, he picks her up and jumps off a cliff. Yuta finds Natsume still alive at the base of the cliff, but she dies in his arms and turns back into bones.
8	"The Last Face (Part I)" "Saigo no Kao (Zenpen)" (最後の顔(前編))	November 29, 2003
Yuta and Mana meet Nanao, a 10-year-old boy carrying a cinerary box who lives with his mother and grandmother. Nanao's grandmother arranges for him to be kidnapped but he escapes and uses family medicine to heal his wounds from the escape. Yuta and Mana take Nanao home, where Nanao's grandmother shows Yuta and Mana a photograph of Nanao's mother, who does not appear be the woman Nanao calls Mother. Alone, Nanao's mother opens the cinerary box, revealing the skin of a scarred woman's face. The next day Mana and Nanao see Nanao's mother enter the cellar, but later the woman from the photo emerges with a bandage on one side of her face. In the cellar, Mana discovers surgical instruments and the skin from the face of Nanao's mother. Meanwhile, Yuta follows Nanao's kidnapper who meets the woman with the bandage covering a scar. Yuta overhears her call him Nanao and him call her Mother but she pushes him over a cliff. The older Nanao explains to Yuta that, 25 years ago, his mother ate mermaid flesh and then eight years ago, his mother, who had not aged in 25 years, kidnapped his son who is also called Nanao.
9	"The Last Face (Part II)" "Saigo no Kao (Kōhen)" (最後の顔(後編))	December 6, 2003
Mana discovers the face of Nanao's mother in the cinerary box in the basement. She is suddenly attacked by the scarred woman and manages to escape, but is wounded by an axe. The woman then painfully removes her own face and attaches the one from the box and reappears as Nanao's mother. Yuta concludes that she has eaten mermaid flesh, especially after Mana opens the box and sees the scarred face inside. Yuta realizes that she is the same woman. The woman explains that 25 years earlier, her son Nanao left her to live with his father so she tried to feed him mermaid flesh to stop him ageing, but his grandmother took him to his father. When Nanao had a son, she abducted the boy and brought him up as her own son. She used the face of a dead woman to hide her face which had become scarred from the poison within the mermaid flesh. Desperately she grabs Nanao and tries to force him to eat the flesh, but Yuta stops her. Realizing that she has lost, she leaves, and later the body of a woman is found in a burned-out storehouse.
10	"Promised Tomorrow (Part I)" "Yakusoku no Ashita (Zenpen)" (約束の明日(前編))	December 13, 2003
Yuta takes Mana to visit the grave of the Kogure family grave where 60 years earlier, he knew a kind girl named Nae. Mana then encounters a girl being chases by a man with dogs and intervenes to save her. The girl kills the man with a rock, but Mana is blamed and his associates kill and bury her. Yuta searches for Mana and encounters Sokichi, an old man who was Nae's servant as a boy who says that everyone believed that Nae had left with Yuta, abandoning her fiancee Eijiro. Meanwhile, Mana revives and discovers that Eijiro has kept Nae confined on his estate, looking perpetually young, but without any knowledge of her past. Meanwhile, Yuta is captured by Eijiro's men and knocked unconscious and he calls how Nae told him how a travelling nun left mermaid ashes which Nae used to create the Red Valley, a field of perennially blooming red flowers. When Yuta awakes, Eijiro tells him that he found Nae's body in the Red Valley, and Yuta tells him another version of the story of mermaid ashes in which a villager killed a nun to steal the ashes, but the nun came back to life and killed many of the villagers. Nae kills some of Eijiro's men and leaves with Mana following her. Eijiro orders his men to recapture Nae unharmed but to decapitate Yuta and Mana.
11	"Promised Tomorrow (Part II)" "Yakusoku no Ashita (Kōhen)" (約束の明日(後編))	December 20, 2003
Sokichi helps Yuta escape, and they drive to the Red Valley. He reminds Yuta of a signal of arranged stones Yuta devised with Nae to meet in the Red Valley on the day he was to depart. Yuta denies that he gave the signal and suspects that someone else did. Eijiro and his men catch up with two girls and stabs Nae with his cane sword. He admits that he set the stone signal to test Nae's loyalty to him. When she arrived to leave with Yuta, Eijiro killed her in a jealous rage. Eijiro had planned to revive Nae with the mermaid ashes, but could not find them. He explains that for decades he searched for the ashes, and after finally finding them, he used them to revive Nae's still pristine corpse laying in the Red Valley. Mortally wounded, Nae staggers into in the Red Valley and remembers that Eijiro killed her there. Meanwhile, Yuta and Sokichi have escaped Eijiro's men and Yuta embraces Nae. She finally recalls the events of the past, but she dies in his arms. As Yuta and Mana leave, Yuta asks Mana if she is jealous, but Mana cheekily asks Yuta if jealousy is some kind of dessert. (Note: The Japanese word for "jealous" (yakimochi (焼き餅)) sounds the same as the word for a grilled or broiled mochi, a pounded rice cake)
12	"Mermaid's Scar (Part I)" "Ningyo no Kizu (Zenpen)" (人魚の傷(前編))	May 19, 2004 (DVD only)
Yuta and Mana encountera boy called Masato who is traveling from Tokyo to live with his mother. One night two years later, Masato stabs his mother in the chest, then cleans up the murder scene. However, the next morning when the housekeeper Yukie arrives, Masato's mother is alive again. At a nearby seaside a nearby construction site where Yuta and Mana are working, Yuta learns about a mysterious body that washed ashore and how that after Masato's mother died in a boat accident, she came back to life. Later, Masato's mother notices that her chest wound is not healing and attacks Masato demanding mermaid flesh, but the boy is saved by Yuta. Masato gives Yukie a piece of mermaid flesh, hoping to make her immortal, but she becomes a Deformed instead and attacks Masato and his mother. Yuta arrives in time to kill the monster, but then realizes that it was Yukie. Mana escapes to safety with Masato who leads her to his hiding place. Meanwhile, Masato's mother tells Yuta that the immortal Masato gave her mermaid flesh after a Pacific War bombing raid, making her essentially his immortal captive mother. She ran away, but he found her again from after news of the boat accident. She finally dies from wounds inflicted by the Deformed. In his hideout, Masato suddenly tasers Mana and prepares to kill Yuta.
13	"Mermaid's Scar (Part II)" "Ningyo no Kizu (Kōhen)" (人魚の傷(後編))	May 19, 2004 (DVD only)
Masato reveals to his captive Mana that he is going to kill Yuta. Masato returns to the house, where he tricks Yuta into being caught in a booby trap of piano wire which cuts deeply into his neck. Masato explains that he is over 800 years old and recounts how he used mermaid flesh to transform many women into becoming long-lived mothers to him, but they all eventually died. Mana escapes her bonds and arrives to save Yuta just as Masato is in the process of beheading him with an ax. Masato shoots Mana, who as he dies, promises to kill Masato if he shoots Yuta, however she collapses first. Masato sets fire to the house to kill Mana, however, she awakes in time to drag Yuta's corpse from the fire. Masato drives off in his mother's car, but loses control. As a head-on collision with a truck is imminent, he resolves to find his next companion after he comes back to life. Yuta eventually revives and finds Mana crying. Later, he ask Mana why she cried and she replies that it was out of happiness.

== Reception ==
Mermaid Saga was awarded the 20th Seiun Award for the Best Comic category in 1989.

== See also ==
- Mermaids in popular culture
