= Kōzō Mito =

Japanese voice actor

- 三戸 耕三
- Born: June 8, 1979 (age 47); Yamaguchi, Japan
- Occupation: Voice actor
- Years active: 2002–present

Kōzō Mito (三戸 耕三, Mito Kōzō; born June 8, 1979) is a Japanese voice actor.

== Filmography ==
=== Anime series ===
- Code Geass: Lelouch of the Rebellion (2006) - Pilot (ep 8); Staff (ep 7)
- Deltora Quest (2007) - Li-nan
- Code Geass: Lelouch of the Rebellion R2 (2008) - Kanon Maldini
- Attack on Titan (2013) – Gunther Schultz
- Attack on Titan: Junior High (2015) – Gunther Schultz
- Wonder Egg Priority (2021) – Kendo Club Advisor (ep 10)

Unknown date

- Gunslinger Girl -Il Teatrino- as Giuseppe
- IGPX as Takeshi Jinno
- Inazuma Eleven GO as Hyoudou Tsukasa
- Initial D: Fourth Stage as Male B (Ep 1)
- Mermaid Forest as Shiina
- Mobile Suit Gundam Seed as Al Da Flaga (ep 45); Ray Yuki (ep 35,50)
- Mobile Suit Gundam Seed Special Edition as Ray Yuki
- Planetes as Black Clothes (ep 20); Cadet C (ep 21); Classmate (ep 13); Company Employee (ep 22); Controller (ep 23); Coworker (ep 10); Debris Dumper B (ep 9); Deputy Commander B (ep 12); Devon; Hotel Man (ep 6); Male A (ep 7); Male Fan (ep 19); Pilot (ep 18); Reporter (ep 25); Researcher (ep 11)
- Pokémon Mystery Dungeon: Team Go-Getters Out Of The Gate! as Madatsubomi
- Rumiko Takahashi Anthology as employee (ep 2); male subordinate (ep 9); mover (ep 13); Risa's son (ep 7)
- Wangan Midnight as RGO Yamanaka
- Yomigaeru Sora – Rescue Wings as Kengo Mochizuki (ep 10,11)

=== Anime films ===
- Doraemon: Nobita in the Wan-Nyan Spacetime Odyssey (2004) – Officer
- Paprika (2006) – Pierrot
- Jungle Emperor Leo: The Brave Change The Future (2009) – Hunters
- Code Geass: Lelouch of the Re;surrection (2019) – Kanon Maldini

=== Original net animation ===
- The King of Fighters: Destiny (2017) – Joe Higashi
- Ninjala (2020) – Lucy's Dad

=== Video games ===
- Tokyo Mirage Sessions ♯FE (2015) – Cord
- The King of Fighters XIV (2016) – Joe Higashi
- The King of Fighters All Star (2018) – Joe Higashi
- Tales of Arise (2021) – Grenar, Hevrekt-35
- The King of Fighters XV (2022) – Joe Higashi
- Street Fighter 6 (2024) – Joe Higashi
- Fatal Fury: City of the Wolves (2025) – Joe Higashi
