= Virgin Fleet =

Japanese OVA series

- Official Region 1 DVD cover released by Central Park Media

聖少女艦隊バージンフリート (Seishōjo Kantai Virgin Fleet)
- Original video animation
- Directed by: Masahiro Hosoda
- Produced by: Oji Hiroi (executive)
- Written by: Yasuhiro Imagawa
- Music by: Masumi Itō
- Studio: AIC
- Licensed by: NA: Central Park Media
- Released: April 25, 1998 – October 25, 1998
- Runtime: 30 min/episode
- Episodes: 3
- Video game
- Developer: Konami Computer Entertainment Japan
- Publisher: Konami
- Genre: TRPG
- Platform: PlayStation
- Released: July 1, 1999

Virgin Fleet (聖少女艦隊バージンフリート, Seishōjo Kantai Virgin Fleet) is a 1998 anime OVA series created by Oji Hiroi (of Sakura Wars fame) and Yasuhiro Imagawa and produced by AIC and Beam Entertainment. A video game sequel was released in 1999 for the PlayStation console.

== Plot summary ==
The series takes place after the end of the first World War circa the 1930s, where virgin young women who have a special energy called Virgin Energy are called upon to pilot fighter jets who rely on Virgin energy. The story follows Shiokaze Umino as she attends the Nakano Women's Naval Academy with her classmates Satsuki and Komachi as they balance being on-duty and their regular school life.

== Characters ==
Shiokaze Umino (海野 潮風)
Voiced by: Sumi Shimamoto (Japanese); Jessica Calvello (English)
Mau Sakisaka (咲坂 舞)
Voiced by: Kousuke Okano (Japanese); Crispin Freeman (English)
Satsuki Yukimisawa (雪見沢 五月)
Voiced by: Satsuki Yukino (Japanese); Megan Hollingshead (English)
Komachi Kusatsuzuki (草津月 小町)
Voiced by: Chinami Nishimura (Japanese); Angora Deb (English)
Hidemaro Hirose (広瀬 英麻呂)
Voiced by: Gara Takashima (Japanese); Rhonda Ayers (English)
VAdm Tatsutagawa (達田川)
Voiced by: Tatsuyuki Jinnai (Japanese); Gregory Wolfe (English)
LtCdr. Wakamoto (若本)
Voiced by: Norio Wakamoto (Japanese); John Hobbs (English)
Kōka Hirose (広瀬 光華)
Voiced by: Mami Koyama (Japanese); Karen Smith (English)
Suzukure Mibuno (壬生ノ 涼暮)
Voiced by: Kazue Komiya (Japanese); Angora Deb (English)
Hatsuki Fujiwara (藤原 初見)
Voiced by: Mari Yokoo (Japanese); Lisa Ortiz (English)
Ise Haruoshimi (春惜 伊勢)
Voiced by: Mariko Kouda (Japanese); Jessica Calvello (English)
Matsuri Sakisaka (咲坂 茉莉)
Voiced by: Ai Satō (Japanese); Lisa Ortiz (English)
Diesel Sada (ディーゼルの貞)
Voiced by: Kappei Yamaguchi (Japanese); Michael Alben (English)
Nikola Papilo (ニコラ・パブリオ)
Voiced by: Yōko Sōmi (Japanese); Rhonda Ayers (English)

== Media ==
=== Episodes ===
The OVAs consisted of three episodes released from April 25 to October 25, 1998, and were released on VHS, Laserdisc, and DVD by Beam Entertainment. The OVAs were licensed in North America by Central Park Media and released under the U.S. Manga Corps label on VHS and DVD in 2000. The English dub was produced by Headline Studios in Irvington, New York.

No.	Title	Original release date
1	"First Experience" "Hatsu Taiken" (初体験)	April 25, 1998
2	"Snow In May" "Gogatsu no Yuki" (五月の雪)	August 22, 1998
3	"First Cherry Blossoms" "Shoya Sakura" (初夜桜)	October 25, 1998

=== Music ===
Opening
Aitsu Performed by Sumi Shimamoto
Closing
Virgin Fleet Go! Go! Performed by Sumi Shimamoto, Satsuki Yukino, Chinami Nishimura
