= One-pound Gospel =

Japanese manga series

- First tankōbon volume cover, featuring Sister Angela (above) and Kosaku Hatanaka (below)

1ポンドの福音 (Ichi-Pondo no Fukuin)
- Genre: Romance
- Manga
- Written by: Rumiko Takahashi
- Published by: Shogakukan
- English publisher: NA: Viz Media
- Magazine: Weekly Young Sunday
- English magazine: NA: Animerica (some chapters)
- Original run: July 24, 1987 – December 21, 2006
- Volumes: 4
- Original video animation
- Directed by: Makura Saki
- Music by: Kenji Kawai
- Studio: Studio Gallop
- Licensed by: NA: Viz Video
- Released: December 2, 1988
- Runtime: 55 minutes
- Television drama
- Original network: Nippon TV
- Original run: January 12, 2008 – March 8, 2008
- Episodes: 9
- icon

One-pound Gospel (Japanese: 1ポンドの福音, Hepburn: Ichi-Pondo no Fukuin) is a Japanese manga series written and illustrated by Rumiko Takahashi. It was serialized in Shogakukan's seinen manga magazine Weekly Young Sunday from July 1987 to December 2006, with its chapters collected into four tankōbon volumes. The story is a fusion of the sports (specifically, boxing) and romantic comedy genres.

Studio Gallop produced an anime original video animation adaptation in 1988. A live-action television drama adaptation starring Kazuya Kamenashi from KAT-TUN and Meisa Kuroki aired for nine episodes in 2008. Viz Media licensed and released the manga and OVA in North America.

== Plot ==
The series follows Kosaku Hatanaka (畑中耕作, Hatanaka Kōsaku), the pride of Mukōda Gym (向田ジム, Mukōda Jimu) for the most part. He went pro in only two bouts after leaving high school, and his strong punches are universally recognized by his opponents. While he is a natural at boxing, he cannot control his voracious appetite. Not surprisingly, Kosaku eats anything and everything. As a result, he has been forced to change his weight class since high school. Going from flyweight, all the way up to featherweight, something his trainer tells him he does not have the frame for. On top of this he accepts challenges from higher weight classes, giving his coach (and himself) constant trouble.

Into this picture steps Sister Angela (シスターアンジェラ, Shisutā Anjera), a novice nun who takes Kosaku on as a personal project, determined to set him on the right path and break his habit of gluttony. She constantly encourages him, making sure that he stays in shape while staying away from food. Unfortunately, closeness can sometimes breed feelings of affection, which Kosaku begins to develop. Even worse, Sister Angela realizes she is beginning to have the same problems as well.

== Media ==
=== Manga ===
Written and illustrated by Rumiko Takahashi, chapters of One-pound Gospel were sporadically published in Shogakukan's seinen manga magazine Weekly Young Sunday between July 24, 1987, and December 21, 2006. The chapters were collected and published into four tankōbon volumes by Shogakukan from July 5, 1989, to March 5, 2007.

It was released in North America by Viz Media, adapted into English by Gerard Jones, with some chapters serialized in Animerica. It was published in both a monthly comic book format and as three volumes mirroring the Japanese tankōbon from 1996 to 1998. The volumes were re-published in 2008, to include the final fourth volume.

==== Volumes ====
No.	Original release date	Original ISBN	English release date	English ISBN
1	July 5, 1989	4-09-151101-5	August 5, 1996	978-1-56-931131-8
2	July 5, 1990	4-09-151102-3	April 5, 1997	978-1-56-931188-2
3	July 5, 1996	4-09-151103-1	June 5, 1998	978-1-56-931260-5
4	March 5, 2007	978-4-09-151170-6	December 9, 2008	978-1-42-152033-9

=== Other media ===
One-pound Gospel was adapted into a single 55 minute anime original video animation by Studio Gallop. Directed by Osamu Dezaki, under the alias Makura Saki, it was released on December 2, 1988. The OVA was released by Viz Media on subtitled VHS in 1995. Unlike the manga, Angela is two years older than Kosaku and has a red scooter.

A live-action television adaptation of the manga aired on Nippon TV from January 12 to March 8, 2008. The nine-episode series stars KAT-TUN's Kamenashi Kazuya as Hatanaka Kosaku and Meisa Kuroki as Sister Angela. It was released in a DVD box set on September 3, 2008. A CD containing the music used in the drama was released on February 27, 2008, as One Pound Gospel Original Soundtrack.

== Reception ==
Shaenon K. Garrity, writing for Anime News Network, stated that despite the unlikely combination of boxing and Catholicism in a situational comedy, Takahashi makes it work. She also called the action scenes "realistic" with proper boxing terminology. Garrity suspected the author was paying tribute to Mitsuru Adachi with the sports comedy and believes that One-pound Gospel appeals to fans of Takahashi's older "slapstick" works, as opposed to her new dramatic works.
