= Toshiko Sawada =

Japanese voice actress

Toshiko Sawada (沢田 敏子, Sawada Toshiko; born September 14, 1936) is a Japanese voice actress from Fukuoka Prefecture, Japan.

== Filmography ==
=== Anime ===
- Amada Anime Series: Super Mario Bros. (Narration)
- Appleseed (Athena)
- Berserk (Queen)
- Cinderella Monogatari (Cinderella's stepmother)
- Go! Princess PreCure (Yume Mochizuki)
- Hinako Note (Grandmother)
- Minky Momo (Devil Queen)
- Magi: The Labyrinth of Magic (Baba)
- Maison Ikkoku (Kamiogi)
- Maya the Honey Bee (Thekla)
- Minky Momo Tabidachi no Eki (OVA) (Mistress)
- Mob Psycho 100: The Spirits and Such Consultation Office's First Company Outing ~A Healing Trip that Warms the Heart~ (OVA) (Okami's Mother)
- Mobile Suit Gundam (Kamaria Ray)
- Violet Evergarden (Tiffany Evergarden)
- Overman King Gainer (Martena Lane)
- Robotics;Notes (Kaoruko Usui)
- Rumic World: The Laughing Target (Azusa's Mother)
- Zillion (Admis)
- Jigoku Shōjo Futakomori (Michiyo Takeda, ep 18)
- Clannad After Story (Kindergarten principal, ep 19)
- Chrome Shelled Regios (Delbone Quantis Miura)
- Shiki (Setsuko Yasumori)

=== Video games ===
- Kingdom Hearts series (Maleficent)
- WarioWare Gold (Mrs. Munchly)

=== Dubbing ===
==== Live-action ====
- Helen Mirren
  - Red (Victoria Winslow)
  - Red 2 (Victoria Winslow)
  - The Fate of the Furious (Magdalene Shaw)
  - Hobbs & Shaw (Magdalene Shaw)
  - F9 (Magdalene Shaw)
  - Fast X (Magdalene Shaw)
- Addams Family Values (Morticia Addams (Anjelica Huston))
- Admission (Susannah (Lily Tomlin))
- Anonymous Rex (Shin (Faye Dunaway))
- Any Day Now (Judge Meyerson (Frances Fisher))
- Armageddon (2002 Fuji TV edition) (Dottie (Grace Zabriskie))
- Audrey (Anna Cataldi)
- The Best Years of a Life (Anne Gauthier (Anouk Aimée))
- The Birdcage (Louise Keeley (Dianne Wiest))
- Bridget Jones's Baby (Mrs. Pamela Jones (Gemma Jones))
- Broadchurch (Jocelyn Knight QC (Charlotte Rampling))
- Diamonds Are Forever (Tiffany Case (Jill St. John))
- Dreamland (Nan (Sheila Reid))
- The Duchess (Georgiana Spencer (Charlotte Rampling))
- Duel (Mrs. Mann (Jacqueline Scott))
- The Godfather (1976 NTV edition) (Sandra Corleone (Julie Gregg))
- Grace and Frankie (Frankie Bergstein (Lily Tomlin))
- Harry Potter and the Deathly Hallows – Part 1 (Auntie Muriel Weasley (Matyelok Gibbs))
- Home Alone 3 (2019 NTV edition) (Mrs. Hess (Marian Seldes))
- In the Mood for Love (Mrs. Suen (Rebecca Pan))
- Interstellar (Elderly Murph (Ellen Burstyn))
- It Chapter Two (Mrs. Kersh (Joan Gregson))
- Joy (Trudy (Isabella Rossellini))
- Keys to the Heart (In-sook (Youn Yuh-jung))
- Lake Placid (Delores Bickerman (Betty White))
- Last Chance Harvey (Jean (Kathy Baker))
- Letters to Juliet (Claire Smith-Wyman (Vanessa Redgrave))
- The Lion, the Witch, and the Wardrobe (Mrs. Macready (Elizabeth Hawthorne))
- A Little Princess (Miss Maria Minchin (Eleanor Bron))
- Lucy in the Sky (Nana Holbrook (Ellen Burstyn))
- Mad Max Beyond Thunderdome (1988 Fuji TV edition) (Aunty Entity (Tina Turner))
- Mad Max: Fury Road (Miss Giddy (Jennifer Hagan))
- The Matrix Revolutions (2007 Fuji TV edition) (The Oracle (Mary Alice))
- The Mermaid (Mermaid Shitai (Shuzhen Fan))
- The Messenger: The Story of Joan of Arc (Yolande of Aragon (Faye Dunaway))
- Mission: Impossible (1999 Fuji TV/2003 TV Asahi editions) (Max (Vanessa Redgrave))
- Moving On (Evelyn (Lily Tomlin))
- The Ninth Gate (Baroness Kessler (Barbara Jefford))
- Noelle (Elf Polly (Shirley MacLaine))
- The Nude Bomb (1988 TV Asahi edition) (Edith Von Secondberg (Rhonda Fleming))
- Ocean's Twelve (2007 NTV edition) (Molly Starr (Cherry Jones))
- Panic (Deidre (Barbara Bain))
- Post Grad (Maureen Malby (Carol Burnett))
- Practical Magic (Aunt Bridget 'Jet' Owens (Dianne Wiest))
- Private School (1984 Fuji TV edition) (Ms. Regina Copoletta (Sylvia Kristel))
- The Punisher (Lady Tanaka (Kim Miyori))
- Rabbit Hole (Nat (Dianne Wiest))
- Roald Dahl's Esio Trot (Mrs Lavinia Silver (Judi Dench))
- The Secret Life of Walter Mitty (Edna Mitty (Shirley MacLaine))
- Smash (Eileen Rand (Anjelica Huston))
- Sonny & Jed (1979 TV Tokyo edition) (Betty (Laura Betti))
- Step Brothers (Nancy Huff-Doback (Mary Steenburgen))
- Super Mario Bros. (1994 NTV edition) (Lena (Fiona Shaw))
- Superhero Movie (Aunt Lucille (Marion Ross))
- Superman II (1984 TV Asahi edition) (Lara (Susannah York))
- Sweet Home Alabama (Mayor Kate Hennings (Candice Bergen))
- Texas Chainsaw Massacre (Virginia "Ginny" McCumber (Alice Krige))
- Tomorrow Never Dies and The World Is Not Enough (M (Judi Dench))
- Tooth Fairy (Lily (Julie Andrews))
- Two and a Half Men (Evelyn Harper (Holland Taylor))
- Working Girl (Katharine Parker (Sigourney Weaver))
- The Young Indiana Jones Chronicles (Helen Margaret Seymour (Margaret Tyzack))

==== Animation ====
- Cars 2 (Mama Topolino)
- Maya the Bee Movie (Queen Bee)
- Shrek 2 (Queen Lillian)
- Shrek the Third (Queen Lillian)
- Shrek Forever After (Queen Lillian)
- Sleeping Beauty (Maleficent)
