= Sumi Shimamoto =

Japanese voice actress

- 島本 須美
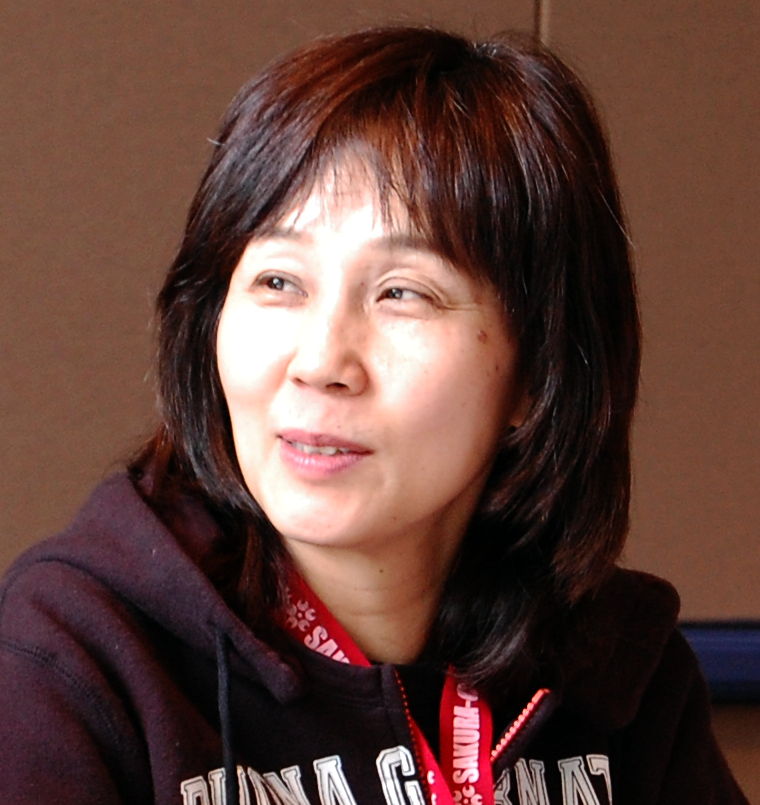
- Shimamoto at Sakura-Con in April 2007.
- Born: Sumi Koshikawa (越川 須美); December 8, 1954 (age 71); Kōchi, Japan
- Occupations: Actress; voice actress; narrator
- Years active: 1970–present
- Notable work: Maison Ikkoku as Kyoko Otonashi; Fire Tripper as Suzuko; Nausicaä of the Valley of the Wind as Nausicaä; Princess Sarah as Sarah Crewe; Patlabor as Ayano Fujii; Virgin Fleet as Shiokaze Umino; Rurouni Kenshin as Tae Sekihara and Sae Sekihara
- Spouse: Daisuke Koshikawa (m. 1984)
- Children: 1

Sumi Koshikawa (越川 須美, Koshikawa Sumi; born December 8, 1954), known professionally as Sumi Shimamoto (島本 須美, Shimamoto Sumi), is a Japanese actress and narrator.

She is best known for having voice acted in Hayao Miyazaki's feature films Nausicaä of the Valley of the Wind, The Castle of Cagliostro, My Neighbor Totoro, Rumiko Takahashi's Maison Ikkoku, Fire Tripper and Princess Mononoke.

== Biography ==
Shimamoto was born on December 8, 1954, in Kōchi. After graduating from the Toho Gakuen College of Drama and Music, she joined Gekidan Seinenza, a theatrical acting troupe. She is currently independent of any talent management company.

She is married to Daisuke Koshikawa, one of the founders of the comedy troupe Chibikko Gang. Their first child, Shiori, has also done voice acting.

== Roles ==
Her best-known voice roles include Nausicaä in Nausicaä of the Valley of the Wind, Suzuko in Fire Tripper and Kyoko Otonashi in Maison Ikkoku.

She won the role of Nausicaä after she impressed Hayao Miyazaki with her role as Clarisse in his debut film The Castle of Cagliostro, subsequently appearing in two more of his movies, My Neighbor Totoro and Princess Mononoke.

== Filmography ==
=== Television animation ===
1977

- Seito Shokun (Māru (Mariko Hōjō)

1979

- The Ultraman (Mutsumi Hoshikawa)

1980

- Lupin the Third Part II (Maki Ōyamada in Ep. 155)

1981

- Ulysses 31 (Yumi)

1982

- Combat Mecha Xabungle (Maria Maria; First voice)
- Urusei Yatsura (Asuka Mizunokoji, Tsuyuko Amamori)

1983

- Yume Senshi Wingman (Matsuoka-sensei)
- Mrs. Pepperpot (Rūri)

1984

- Doraemon (Kībō)

1985

- Princess Sarah (Sarah Crewe)
- Dirty Pair (Margaret Tainer)
- Ninja Senshi Tobikage (Princess Romina Ladorio)

1986

- The Wonderful Wizard of Oz (Dorothy)
- Maison Ikkoku (Kyoko Otonashi)
- Dragon Ball (Mermaid)
- Ōi! Ryōma (Sakae Sakaki)
- Pippi Longstocking (Japanese dub) (Lady)
- Sango-shō Densetsu: Aoi Umi no Elfie (Elfie)
- Seishun Anime Zenshū Izu no Odoriko (Kaoru)
- Oh! Family (Fee Anderson)

1987

- City Hunter (Maki Himuro)
- Grimm's Fairy Tale Classics (Princess Elena)

1988

- Kiteretsu Daihyakka (Michiko Kite, Yoshie Sakurai, Ikue Hanamaru)
- Grimm's Fairy Tale Classics (Princess Elena)
- Let's Go! Anpanman (Shokupanman, Dekako Mom, Additional voices)
- Vampire Princess Miyu (Shinma Enju)
- Mister Ajikko (Yoamuhi)

1989

- Kimba the White Lion (new) (Eliza, Ryōna)
- The Adventures of Peter Pan (Tinker Bell)
- Patlabor: The TV Series (Ayano Fujii)
- Legend of Heavenly Sphere Shurato (Goddess of Harmony Vishnu)

1990

- Moomin (Mrs. Fillyjonk)
- NG Knight Ramune & 40 (Monobe-sensei)
- Kyatto Ninden Teyandee (Usa no Tsunade)

1991

- Mischievous Twins: The Tales of St. Clare's (Hilary)
- Oniisama e (Rei Asaka)
- Sally, the Witch (new) (Sumire's mother)
- Reporter Blues (Toni)
- Pigmario (Shōryō Orie)
- Madara (Princess Sakuya)

1992

- Hello Kitty: Yappari Mama ga suki (Mama)
- Floral Magician Mary Bell (Mama Belle)
- Super Bikkuriman (Maka Turtle)
- Tsuyoshi Shikkari Shinasai (Kawakami-sensei)
- Kindaichi Case Files (Risa Kurea, Arisa Midō)
- Jeanie with the Light Brown Hair (Sister Conrad)
- Mikan Enikki
- Mama wa Shōgaku 4 Nensei (Sawako Yamaguchi)

1993

- Pokonyan! (Momoko-sensei)
- Ocean Waves (Rikako's father's lover)
- Sorcerer Hunters (Big Mama)

1994

- Akazukin Chacha (Piisuke, Urara Principal, Shiine's mother, Additional voices)
- Hello Kitty: Papa nante daikirai (Mama)

1995

- Zenki (Rengetsu)
- Kūsō Kagaku Sekai Gulliver Boy (Ripley)
- Hello Kitty: Shiawase no Tulip (Mama)

1996

- Mizuiro Jidai (Obasan)
- Pretty Soldier Sailor Moon Sailor Stars (Akane)
- Rurouni Kenshin (Tae Sekihara, Sae Sekihara)

1997

- Great Detective Conan (Yukiko Kudo)
- Cutie Honey Flash (Claire)
- Don't Leave Me Alone, Daisy (Rarako-sensei)
- Kindaichi Case Files (Arisa Kure) (Eps 16-17)

1998

- Eat-Man '98 (Koko)
- Princess Nine (Shino Hayakawa)
- Silent Möbius (Tomona Yamikumo)

1999

- GTO (Chizuru Ōta)
- Master Keaton (Anna Plummer)
- Shinkai Densetsu Meremanoid (Rūsumirā)
- Hello Kitty's Paradise (Mama, Additional voices)

2000

- Hidamari no Ki (Geisha)
- Kyo Kara Maoh! (Alazon)

2001

- I My Me! Strawberry Eggs (Fukiko Kuzuha)
- Kiddy Grade (Mrs. Padushka)
- Yu-Gi-Oh! Duel Monsters (Ishizu Ishtar, Priestess Isis)

2002

- Ai Yori Aoshi (Taeko Minazuki's mother and grandmother)
- Cyborg 009: The Cyborg Soldier (Ixquic)
- Full Moon (Great Mother)
- Seven of Seven (Mitsuko Suzuki)

2003

- Avenger (Westa)
- Mermaid Forest (Towa)

2004

- Kurau Phantom Memory (Aine, Kleine)
- Ojamajo Doremi Na-i-sho (Hikari Waku)

2005

- Sugar Sugar Rune (Candy)
- Tsubasa Chronicle (Emeraude)
- Black Jack (Sono Eiko)
- Bleach (Miyako Shiba)
- SoltyRei (Eirenē)

2006

- XxxHolic (Hydrangea)

2007

- Victorian Romance Emma (Aurelia Jones)
- Gin Tama (Mitsuba Okita)
- Lucky Star (Kanata Izumi)

2011

- Nichijou (Lover's Umbrella in Ep. 21)
- Fractale (Moeran)
- Penguindrum (Goddess)

2012

- Smile PreCure! (Royal Queen)
- Is This a Zombie? of the Dead (Delusion Yū)

2013

- Ishida & Asakura (Kinoshita)

2014

- Space Dandy (Alethia)

2017

- Girls' Last Tour (Eryngii)
- Berserk (Flora)

2018

- March Comes in Like a Lion (Kōda's Wife)

2021

- Dragon Goes House-Hunting (Jörmungandr)
- Getter Robo Arc (Ryō Nagare)

2022

- Insect Land (Earth)

2023

- Chibi Godzilla Raids Again (Narration)

Unknown date

- Hachijū Hiai Sekai Isshū (Chiko)
- Neo Hayper Kids (Reader)
- Shūkan Storyland (Narration)
- Violinist of Hameln (Queen Horun)
- Zendaman (Eve)

=== Theatrical animation ===
- The Castle of Cagliostro (1979) (Clarisse de Cagliostro)
- Unico in the Island of Magic (1983) (Cherry)
- Nausicaä of the Valley of the Wind (1984) (Nausicaä)
- Fire Tripper (1985) (Suzuko)
- Maison Ikkoku: Kanketsuhen (1988) (Kyōko Otonashi)
- My Neighbor Totoro (1988) (Mother (Yasuko Kusakabe)
- Umeboshi Denka: Uchū no Hate kara Banbaroban! (1994) (Mama)
- Kazu & Yasu: Hero Tanjō (1995) (Yoshiko Miura)
- Chocchan Monogatari (1996) (Chō Kuroyanagi)
- Princess Mononoke (1997) (Toki)
- One Piece: Clockwork Island Adventure (2001) (Madame)
- Case Closed: The Phantom of Baker Street (2002) (Irene Adler)
- Children Who Chase Lost Voices (2011) (Lisa/Morisaki's Wife)
- Natsume's Book of Friends the Movie (2018) (Yorie Tsumura)
- Haikara-san ga Tōru: Part 2 (2018) (Tousei's mother)
- Weathering with You (2019) (Mrs. Mamiya)
- Belle (2021) (Suzu's Mother)
- Aria the Benedizione (2021) (Asuka R. Baggio)
- The Concierge at Hokkyoku Department Store (2023) (Laughing Owl (Wife))
- The Rose of Versailles (2025) (Madame Jarjayes)

Unknown date

- Aitsu to Lullaby: Suiyōbi no Cinderella (that girl)
- Utsunomiko: Chijōhen (Nayotake)

=== Original video animation (OVA) ===
- Seito Shokun! (1980) Mariko Kitashiro)
- Dream Hunter Rem (1984) (Yōko Takamiya, Keiko)
- Urusei Yatsura (1985) (Asuka Mizunokoji)
- Fire Tripper (1985) (Suzuko)
- Fight! Iczer One (1985) (Sir Violet)
- Maris the Chojo (1986) (Towa)
- Maris the Chojo (1986) (Sue)
- Hell Target (1987) (Tiki Carmack)
- The Irresponsible Captain Tylor (1989) (Miranda)
- Devil Hunter Yohko (1990) (Princess Yanagi)
- Tokyo Babylon (1990) (Kiriko Kashiwagi)
- Iczer Reborn (1990) (Sister Grey)
- Here Is Greenwood (1991) (Sumire Hasukawa)
- Maison Ikkoku Bangaihen: Ikkokujima Nanpa Shimatsuki (1991) (Kyōko Otonashi)
- Maison Ikkoku Prelude (1992) (Kyōko Otonashi)
- Giant Robo: The Day the Earth Stood Still (1992) (Ginrei)
- Giant Robo: Gin Rei (1994) (Ginrei)
- Fire Emblem (1996) (Elis)
- Jungle de Ikou! (1997) (Rongo)
- Virgin Fleet (1998) (Shiokaze Umino)

Unknown date

- Gōshō Aoyama's Collection of Short Stories (Yukiko Fujimine)
- Gōshō Aoyama's Collection of Short Stories 2 (Yukiko Kudō)
- Hello Kitty (Mama)
- Hello Kitty no Hajimete no Christmas Cake (Mama)
- Hello Kitty to Issho (Mama)
- Kitty to Daniel no Suteki na Christmas (Mama)
- Kamen Rider (Ruriko Midorikawa)
- Madara (Princess Sakuya)
- Mikan Enikki: Mikan America e Iku?! ()
- Salamander (Paola)
- Sorcerer Hunters (Big Mama)
- Tetsuwan Gin Rei (Ginrei)
- Yōchien Sentai Genkizzu (Tomomi-sensei)

=== Original net animation (ONA) ===
- Sword Gai The Animation (2018) – Kei

=== Video games ===
- Chaos Rings (xxxx) (Theia)
- Dissidia Final Fantasy (xxxx) (Cosmos)
- Eternal Melody (xxxx) (Tina Harvel)
- Fire Emblem Heroes (2019) (Elice, Nagi)
- Kessen II (xxxx) (Xun Yu)
- Otomedius (xxxx) (Gofer Sisters, Irene, Operetta)
- Mugen Senshi Valis (xxxx) (Yuuko Asou)
- Shinki Gensō Spectral Souls II (xxxx) (Leilia, Horun)
- Super Robot Wars series (xxxx) (Romina Ladorio)
- Sword of the Berserk: Guts' Rage (xxxx) (Eliza, Annette)
- Xexex (xxxx) (Elaine Laccius)
- Umineko When They Cry (xxxx) (Kasumi Sumadera)
- Sakura Wars 2 (1998) (Margueritte Chateaubriand)
- Tactics Ogre: Reborn (2022) (Olivya Phoraena)

=== Radio ===
- Seishun Adventure: Hiroshi Mori's "Joō no Hyaku Hisshitsu" (Queen Debō Suho)

=== CD ===
- 20-mensō ni Onegai!! Koi hodo Suteki na Musical ha nai (Utako Ōkawa)
- Koisuru KI·MO·CHI (as Kyōko Otonashi)

=== Live action ===
- Tarō no Seishun (TV, 1980), Setsuko Muramatsu
- Let's Talk About the Old Times (Film, 2022), herself
- Anpan (TV, 2025), Kako Ode
- Unbound (TV, 2025), Taka

=== Dubbing ===
- Carrie Fisher
  - Jay and Silent Bob Strike Back (Nun)
  - Star Wars (Princess Leia Organa)
  - The Empire Strikes Back (Princess Leia Organa)
  - Return of the Jedi (Princess Leia Organa)
- Joey Wong
  - 100 Ways to Murder Your Wife (Wang Hsiao Hsien)
  - A Chinese Ghost Story (Nip Siu Sin)
  - A Chinese Ghost Story II (Windy Fu Ching Fung)
  - A Chinese Ghost Story III (Lotus)
- Angel Heart (Epiphany Proudfoot (Lisa Bonet))
- Another Stakeout (A.D.A. Gina Garrett (Rosie O'Donnell))
- Arsène Lupin (Clarisse de Dreux-Soubise (Eva Green))
- The Assassins (Lingju / Diaochan (Liu Yifei))
- Basic Instinct (Catherine Tramell (Sharon Stone))
- Creator (Barbara Spencer (Virginia Madsen))
- The Crow: Wicked Prayer (Lilly (Emmanuelle Chriqui))
- Dangerous Liaisons (Madame Marie de Tourvel (Michelle Pfeiffer))
- F/X2 (Kim Brandon (Rachel Ticotin))
- The Fisher King (Lydia Sinclair (Amanda Plummer))
- Green Card (Brontë Parrish (Andie MacDowell))
- Honey, I Shrunk the Kids (Mae Thompson (Kristine Sutherland))
- Inferno (Sara (Eleonora Giorgi))
- Jack Frost (Gabby Frost (Kelly Preston))
- Johnny Handsome (Donna McCarty (Elizabeth McGovern))
- A Little Princess (Sara Crewe (Amelia Shankley))
- Little Women (Elizabeth "Beth" March (Margaret O'Brien))
- Mannequin (Ema "Emmy" Hesire (Kim Cattrall))
- The Mean Season (Christine Connelly (Mariel Hemingway))
- Mercy Mission: The Rescue of Flight 771 (Ellen (Rebecca Rigg))
- Miss Marple: A Caribbean Mystery
- Mr. Nice Guy (Diana (Gabrielle Fitzpatrick))
- One True Love (Tina (Paget Brewster))
- Pinocchio (Blue Fairy (Nicoletta Braschi))
- Poltergeist (Carol Anne Freeling (Heather O'Rourke))
- Poltergeist II: The Other Side (Carol Anne Freeling (Heather O'Rourke))
- Sahara (Dale Gordon (Brooke Shields))
- She-Devil (Mary Fisher (Meryl Streep))
- The Sixth Sense (Anna Crowe (Olivia Williams))
- Stormy Monday (Kate (Melanie Griffith))
- Stuart Little 2 (Margalo (Melanie Griffith); voice)
- Terminal Velocity (Chris Morrow (Nastassja Kinski))
- Three Men and a Baby (Sylvia Bennington (Nancy Travis))
- Watchmen (Sally Jupiter (Carla Gugino))
- Wolf (Laura Alden (Michelle Pfeiffer))

=== Other ===
- All Finish Tōkyō Midnight: Natsumi's Eye (Natsumi Kawahara)
- I Can Hear the Sea (dialect coach)

== Awards ==
- Anime Grand Prix: Voice actress of the Year (3): 1984, 1987, 1988
- 11th Seiyu Awards: Kazue Takahashi Memorial Award (1): 2017
