= The New Adventures of Hutch the Honeybee =

Japanese anime television series

- 昆虫物語 新みなしごハッチ
- Genre: Adventure
- Created by: Tatsuo Yoshida
- Based on: The Adventures of Hutch the Honeybee
- Directed by: Seitaro Hara
- Music by: Seiji Yokoyama
- Opening theme: "Shin Minashigo Hatchi" by Yuri Shimazaki
- Ending theme: "Utsukushi no Oka" by Yuri Shimazaki
- Country of origin: Japan
- Original language: Japanese
- No. of episodes: 26

Production
- Executive producer: Tatsuo Yoshida
- Producers: Ippei Kuri; Masaru Shibata; Masatsugu Nagai
- Editors: Hajime Taniguchi; Masatoshi Tsurubuchi; Seiji Morita
- Production company: Tatsunoko Production

Original release
- Network: ANN (MBS, NET)
- Release: April 5 – September 27, 1974

The New Adventures of Hutch the Honeybee (昆虫物語 新みなしごハッチ, Konchū Monogatari: Shin Minashigo Hatchi; lit. A New Bug's Tale: Hutch the Orphan), also known as The New Adventures of Hutch the Honeybee, is an anime cartoon series and a sequel to The Adventures of Hutch the Honeybee.

== Plot ==
The sequel starts some time after the events of the first series, as Hutch and his sister, Aya, lose their mother, the Queen Bee, after an attack of the Wasps which destroys their Kingdom. Together, they embark on a long and dangerous journey to find a place called the Beautiful Hill, on which they would rebuild their kingdom, and Aya would become the Queen. Tenten, a ladybug, befriends Hutch and Aya and joins them on their journey, as he searches for his missing father. At the same time they have to confront Apachi, a wasp who seeks revenge against Hutch, believing that he killed his father. At the end of the series, Hutch finally finds his mother, and the story ends with a happy ending.

== Cast ==
- Hutch: Yoko Kuri
- Queen Mama: Haruko Kitahama
- Aya: Yoshiko Yamamoto
- Tenten: Junko Mori
- Taro Ama: Eken Minu
- Apachi: Hiroko Maruyama
- Narrator: Toshiko Sawada

== Episodes ==
No.	Title	Original release date
1	"Arashi no mitsubachi jō" (あらしのみつばち城)	April 5, 1974
2	"MAMA shinanai de!" (ママ死なないで!)	April 12, 1974
3	"Maboroshi no MAMA ga yonde iru" (幻のママがよんでいる)	April 19, 1974
4	"Tobitate! Utsukushi no oka he" (飛びたて!美しの丘へ)	April 26, 1974
5	"KAMAKIRI ichiza no odoriko Ahya" (力マキリー座の踊り子アーヤ)	May 3, 1974
6	"Nakuna TENTEN bōzu" (泣くなテンテン坊主)	May 10, 1974
7	"HACCHI daitokai wo iku" (ハッチ大都会をいく)	May 17, 1974
8	"Kimottama SHIDEMUSHI obasan" (きもっ玉シデムシおばさん)	May 24, 1974
9	"Tobe! Wanpaku TORIO" (飛べ!わんぱくトリオ)	May 31, 1974
10	"HOTARU matsuri no yoru" (ホタルまつりの夜)	June 7, 1974
11	"Mōretsu! Shigokima" (もーれつ!しごき魔)	June 14, 1974
12	"Aa! Semiyoshikun no 168 jikan" (ああ!セミ吉くんの168時間)	June 21, 1974
13	"APACCHI banchō wo buttobase!" (アバッチ番長をぶっとばせ!)	June 28, 1974
14	"Dokugu mono wana" (毒ぐものわな)	July 5, 1974
15	"Minomushi no kieru akuma no mori" (みの虫の消える悪魔の森)	July 12, 1974
16	"Ganbare! BUUBUU taishō" (がんばれ!ブーブー大将)	July 19, 1974
17	"RABURABU TENTEN minatochō" (ラブラブ・テンテン・港町)	July 26, 1974
18	"ARI no sujō no Chōcho" (アリの巣城のチョウチョ)	August 2, 1974
19	"TAGAME kaizoku no shūgeki" (タガメ海賊のしゅうげき)	August 9, 1974
20	"Moero! Sabaku no kettō" (燃えろ!砂漠の決闘)	August 16, 1974
21	"Tobe! Tobe! Mushi no undōkai" (飛べ!飛べ!虫の運動会)	August 23, 1974
22	"KOROKORO, RINRIN nodojiman" (コロコロ・リンリン・のどじまん)	August 30, 1974
23	"Semaru! KOUMORI gundan" (せまる!コウモリ軍団)	September 6, 1974
24	"Kettō! JIGABACHI toride" (決闘!ジガバチ砦)	September 13, 1974
25	"Hi no yama! Saigo no shitō" (火の山!最後の死闘)	September 20, 1974
26	"Aa! HACCHI saigo no hi" (ああ!ハッチ最後の日)	September 27, 1974
