= Rumic Theater =

Japanese manga series

- Rumiko Takahashi Anthology

高橋留美子劇場 / 高橋留美子傑作集 (Takahashi Rumiko Gekijō / Takahashi Rumiko Kessakushū)
- Manga
- Written by: Rumiko Takahashi
- Published by: Shogakukan
- English publisher: NA: Viz Media
- Imprint: Big Comics Special
- Magazine: Big Comic Original
- Original run: 1987 – present
- Volumes: 6
- Anime television series
- Directed by: Akira Nishimori
- Studio: TMS Entertainment
- Licensed by: NA: Geneon
- Original network: TV Tokyo
- Original run: July 5, 2003 – September 27, 2003
- Episodes: 13
- icon

Rumic Theater (高橋留美子劇場, Takahashi Rumiko Gekijō), or Rumiko Takahashi Anthology (高橋留美子傑作集, Takahashi Rumiko Kessakushū), is a Japanese manga anthology series composed of one-shots written and illustrated by Rumiko Takahashi which are published annually in Shogakukan's Big Comic Original magazine since 1987.

A 13-episode anime adaptation of these short stories was produced by TMS Entertainment and broadcast on TV Tokyo from July to September 2003, followed by the sequel series Rumic Theater: Mermaid Forest, adapting Takahashi's Mermaid Saga. A two-episode Japanese television drama based on the stories was broadcast on NHK-BS Premium in July 2012.

== Media ==
=== Manga ===
Rumic Theater is a series of manga one-shots published annually by Rumiko Takahashi in Shogakukan's Big Comic Original since 1987. An English language collection by Viz Media was released in two volumes on June 5, 1996, and June 5, 1998. The first corresponding to the volume The Tragedy of P, but the second being a release of Rumic World's One or Double collection.

==== Volumes ====
| No. | Title | Original release date | English release date |
|---|---|---|---|
| 1 | The Tragedy of P P no Higeki (Pの悲劇) | January 29, 1994; 978-4-09-184721-8 | June 5, 1996; 978-1-56-931054-0 |
"The Tragedy of P" (Pの悲劇, P no Higeki); "The Merchant of Romance" (浪漫の商人, Roman no Akindo); "House of Garbage" (ポイの家, Poi no Uchi); "Hidden in the Pottery" (鉢の中, Hachi no Naka); "One Hundred Years of Love" (百年の恋, Hyakunen no Koi); "Extra-Large Size Happiness" (Lサイズの幸福, L Saizu no Shiawase)
| 2 | The Executive's Dog; Semmu no Inu (専務の犬) | May 29, 1999; 978-4-09-184722-5 | – |
"The Executive's Dog" (専務の犬, Senmu no Inu); "Aberrant Family F" (迷走家族F(ファイアー), Meisō Kazoku Faiā); "As Long as You Are Here" (君がいるだけで, Kimi ga Iru dake de); "Living Room Lovesong" (茶の間のラブソング, Cha no Ma no Rabusongu); "Middle-Aged Teen" (おやじローティーン, Oyaji Rōtīn); "In Lieu of Thanks" (お礼にかえて, Orei ni Kaete)
| 3 | Red Bouquet; Akai Hanataba (赤い花束) | June 30, 2005; 978-4-09-184724-9 | – |
"One Day Dream" (日帰りの夢, Higaeri no Yume); "Grafitti Pop" (おやじグラフィティ, Oyaji Gurafiti); "Dutiful Vacation" (義理のバカンス, Giri no Bakansu); "Help" (ヘルプ, Herupu); "Red Bouquet" (赤い花束, Akai Hanataba); "Permanent Love" (パーマネント・ラブ, Pāmanento Rabu)
| 4 | Birds of Fate; Unmei no Tori (運命の鳥) | July 15, 2011; 978-4-09-183887-2 | – |
"Positive Cooking" (ポジティブ・クッキング, Pojitibu Kukkingu); "Wrong for One's Age" (年甲斐もなく, Toshigai mo Naku); "Birds of Fate" (運命の鳥, Unmei no Tori); "Happiness List" (しあわせリスト, Shiawase Risuto); "Trouble with the Neighbors" (隣家の悩み, Rinka no Nayami); "Scene of the Crime" (事件の現場, Jiken no Genba)
| 5 | Dinner with the Witch; Majo to Dinā (魔女とディナー) | September 18, 2019; 978-4-09-860432-6 | – |
"Dinner with the Witch" (魔女とディナー, Majo to Dinā); "A Guilty Happening" (やましい出来事, Yamashii Dekigoto); "I Hope You Die" (死ねばいいのに, Shineba ii no ni); "Amorphous Family" (不定形ファミリー, Futeikei Famirī); "(Confidentiality) Renaissance" (㊙ルネッサンス, Hi Runessansu); "My Sky" (私のスカイ, Watashi no Sukai)
| 6 | The Power of Money; Kane no Chikara (金の力) | March 29, 2024; 978-4-09-862671-7 | – |
"Room for Two" (ふたりの家, Futari no Ie); "You Are No.1" (きみはNo.1(ナンバーワン), Kimi wa Nanbā Wan); "Nasty Runner" (嫌なランナー, Iya na Rannā); "The Woman From the Past" (昔の女, Mukashi no Onna); "Dedicated to S" (Sに捧ぐ, S ni Sasagu); "The Power of Money" (金の力, Kane no Chikara)

=== Anime ===
In June 2003, the July issue of Animage announced that an anime adaptation of Rumic Theater produced by TMS Entertainment and directed by Akira Nishimori would premiere on TV Tokyo on July 5, 2003. The series ran for 13 episodes until September 27, 2003.

In North America, Geneon Entertainment licensed the series for English language release. They released the series on four DVDs from January 11 to July 19, 2005.

==== Cast and characters ====
| | Character | Japanese | English |
|---|---|---|---|
| Episode 1 "The Tragedy of P" | Yuko Haga (羽賀 裕子, Haga Yūko) | Sakiko Tamagawa | Wendee Lee |
| Episode 1 "The Tragedy of P" | Mrs. Kakei (筧) | Megumi Hayashibara | Sally Dana |
| Episode 1 "The Tragedy of P" | Pitto (ピット) | Naomi Nagasawa | |
| Episode 1 "The Tragedy of P" | Kota Haga (羽賀 浩太, Haga Kōta) | Minami Omi | J.D. Stone |
| Episode 1 "The Tragedy of P" | Hiroshi Kakei (筧 ひろし, Kakei Hiroshi) | Junko Hori | Adam Gordon |
| Episode 1 "The Tragedy of P" | Mr. Haga | Wataru Takagi | Patrick Seitz |
| Episode 1 "The Tragedy of P" | Mitsue (美津江) | Haruna Ikezawa | Carrie Savage |
| Episode 2 "The Merchant of Romance" | Yukari (縁) | Satsuki Yukino | Michelle Ruff |
| Episode 2 "The Merchant of Romance" | Betto (別当) | Kappei Yamaguchi | William Markham |
| Episode 2 "The Merchant of Romance" | Old gentlewoman | Natsumi Sakuma | Barbara Goodson |
| Episode 2 "The Merchant of Romance" | Old gentleman | Yousuke Akimoto | Michael McConnohie |
| Episode 2 "The Merchant of Romance" | Auntie | Minami Takayama | Jody Jaress |
| Episode 2 "The Merchant of Romance" | Pops | Jouji Yanami | William Frederick |
| Episode 2 "The Merchant of Romance" | Keiichi (圭一) | Yasunori Matsumoto | Lance J. Holt |
| Episode 3 "Middle-Aged Teen" | Toshio Furuda (古田 年男, Furuda Toshio) | Akira Kamiya | Doug Stone |
| Episode 3 "Middle-Aged Teen" | Kazuko (和子) | Kazuko Sugiyama | Sonja S. Fox |
| Episode 3 "Middle-Aged Teen" | Minoru Furuda (古田 稔, Furuda Minoru) | Kappei Yamaguchi | Kevin Hatcher |
| Episode 3 "Middle-Aged Teen" | Emiri (絵美理) | Satsuki Yukino | Jennifer Sekiguchi |
| Episode 4 "Hidden in the Pottery" | Yukie Asakawa (浅川 幸恵, Asakawa Yukie) | Megumi Hayashibara | Tara Hudson |
| Episode 4 "Hidden in the Pottery" | Ruriko Tonegawa (利根川 ルリ子, Tonegawa Ruriko) | Kikuko Inoue | Megan Hollingshead |
| Episode 4 "Hidden in the Pottery" | Tonegawa Mother | Tomie Kataoka | Barbara Goodson |
| Episode 4 "Hidden in the Pottery" | Tonegawa Husband | Yasunori Matsumoto | Darrel Guilbeau |
| Episode 4 "Hidden in the Pottery" | Yukie's Husband | Wataru Takagi | Sam Regal |
| Episode 5 "Aberrant Family F" | Hazuki Fuwa (不破 はづき, Fuwa Hazuki) | Yuko Minaguchi | Rachel Hirschfeld |
| Episode 5 "Aberrant Family F" | Hazuki's Father | Bin Shimada | Doug Stone |
| Episode 5 "Aberrant Family F" | Hazuki's Mother | Hisako Kyouda | Erica Shaffer |
| Episode 5 "Aberrant Family F" | Shohei Fuwa (不破 翔平, Fuwa Shohei) | Megumi Hayashibara | J.D. Stone |
| Episode 5 "Aberrant Family F" | Aisaki (愛崎) | Kappei Yamaguchi | Darrel Guilbeau |
| Episode 5 "Aberrant Family F" | Aisaki's Girlfriend | Kumiko Nishihara | Hunter Mackenzie Austin |
| Episode 5 "Aberrant Family F" | Neighbor | Rikako Aikawa | Megan Hollingshead |
| Episode 5 "Aberrant Family F" | Doctor | Toshihiko Nakajima | Stephen Martello |
| Episode 6 "As Long As You Are Here" | Domoto (堂本, Dōmoto) | Chikao Ohtsuka | Alfred Thor |
| Episode 6 "As Long As You Are Here" | Atchara (アッチャラー, Atcharā) | Keiko Han | Reiko Matsuo |
| Episode 6 "As Long As You Are Here" | Hosoda (細田) | Minoru Yada | Reg Green |
| Episode 6 "As Long As You Are Here" | Sumiyo (澄代) | Ikuko Tatsu | Georgette Riley |
| Episode 6 "As Long As You Are Here" | Narrator | Ichiro Nagai | |
| Episode 7 "One Hundred Years of Love" | Risa Hoshino (星野りさ, Hoshino Risa) | Hiroko Emori | Louise Chamis |
| Episode 7 "One Hundred Years of Love" | Koizumi (小泉) | Satsuki Yukino | Hunter Mackenzie Austin |
| Episode 7 "One Hundred Years of Love" | Takanezawa (高根沢) | Yasunori Matsumoto | T. Axelrod |
| Episode 7 "One Hundred Years of Love" | Date (伊達) | Wataru Takagi | Michael McConnohie |
| Episode 8 "In Lieu of Thanks" | Kobato (小鳩) | Satsuki Yukino | Michelle Ruff |
| Episode 8 "In Lieu of Thanks" | Shiratori (白鳥) | Michie Tomizawa | Erika Schaffer |
| Episode 8 "In Lieu of Thanks" | Ukai (鵜飼) | Roko Takisawa | Jody Jaress |
| Episode 8 "In Lieu of Thanks" | Kamoshita (鴨下) | Masayo Kurata | Erika Weinstein |
| Episode 8 "In Lieu of Thanks" | Kyuu (九ち) | Wataru Takagi | Jay Klein |
| Episode 8 "In Lieu of Thanks" | Kobato's Son | Asako Dodo | Barbara Goodson |
| Episode 9 "Living Room Lovesong" | Ichiro Tadokoro (田所 一郎, Tadokoro Ichirō) | Kouji Yata | William Frederick |
| Episode 9 "Living Room Lovesong" | Makiko (牧子) | Nana Yamaguchi | Barbara Goodson |
| Episode 9 "Living Room Lovesong" | Hitomi (ひとみ) | Haruna Ikezawa | Mia Bradley |
| Episode 9 "Living Room Lovesong" | Odagiri (小田切) | Akira Ishida | Liam O'Brien |
| Episode 10 "House of Garbage" | Ritsuko Hirooka (広岡 律子, Hirooka Ritsuko) | Kumiko Watanabe | Karen Thompson |
| Episode 10 "House of Garbage" | Yoshio Hirooka (広岡 良夫, Hirooka Yoshio) | Yasunori Matsumoto | Patrick Seitz |
| Episode 10 "House of Garbage" | Manager | Ryuuji Nakaki | Simon Isaacson |
| Episode 10 "House of Garbage" | Manager's Wife | Miyuki Ichijo | Barbara Goodson |
| Episode 10 "House of Garbage" | Ritsuko's Father-in-Law | Wataru Takagi | William Frederick |
| Episode 10 "House of Garbage" | Kenta Hirooka (広岡 健太) | Sachi Matsumoto | Tara Platt |
| Episode 11 "One Day Dream" | Mr. Shinonome (東雲, Shinonome) | Akira Kamiya | Jackson Daniels |
| Episode 11 "One Day Dream" | Shinonome's Wife | Ai Orikasa | Wendee Lee |
| Episode 11 "One Day Dream" | Tsuyoshi (ツヨシ) | Ikue Ootani | Ted Sroka |
| Episode 11 "One Day Dream" | Seiko Shima (志摩 聖子, Shima Seiko) | Sumi Shimamoto | Jennifer Sekiguchi |
| Episode 11 "One Day Dream" | Shima-chan (シマちゃん) | Fuyumi Shiraishi | Kirsty Pape |
| Episode 11 "One Day Dream" | Tajima (田嶋) | Daiki Nakamura | Mike McFarland |
| Episode 11 "One Day Dream" | Oda (小田) | Mari Maruta | Carrie Savage |
| Episode 12 "Extra-Large Size Happiness" | Hanako (華子) | Gara Takashima | Kirsten Potter |
| Episode 12 "Extra-Large Size Happiness" | Kayoko (加代子) | Masako Kyoda | Sonja S. Fox |
| Episode 12 "Extra-Large Size Happiness" | Ryūichi (隆一) | Nobuo Tobita | Liam O'Brien |
| Episode 12 "Extra-Large Size Happiness" | Young Ryūichi | Asako Dodo | Kirsty Pape |
| Episode 12 "Extra-Large Size Happiness" | Baby Ghost (座敷童, Zashiki Warashi) | Chie Kojiro | |
| Episode 13 "The Executive's Dog" | Matsuko Kogure (小暮 松子, Kogure Matsuko) | Ai Orikasa | Kirsty Pape |
| Episode 13 "The Executive's Dog" | Yuji Kogure (小暮 祐二, Kogure Yūji) | Takehito Koyasu | Chris Kent |
| Episode 13 "The Executive's Dog" | Kanna (カンナ) | Fumi Hirano | Erica Shaffer |
| Episode 13 "The Executive's Dog" | Yuko Kogure (小暮 由布子, Kogure Yuuko) | Machiko Toyoshima | Jennifer Sekiguchi |
| Episode 13 "The Executive's Dog" | Kosuke Kogure (小暮 甲介, Kogure Kosuke) | Mari Maruta | J.D. Stone |
| Episode 13 "The Executive's Dog" | Matsurida (祭田) | Ryo Kamon | Stephen Martello |
| Episode 13 "The Executive's Dog" | Mrs. Matsurida | Mari Mashiba | Sonja S. Fox |
| Episode 13 "The Executive's Dog" | Gorgeous (ゴージャス, Gōjasu) | Wataru Takagi | Liam O'Brien |

==== Episodes ====
| No. | Title | Original release date |
|---|---|---|
| 1 | "The Tragedy of P"; Transliteration: "P no Higeki" (Japanese: Pの悲劇) | July 5, 2003 |
It follows the struggle of Mrs. Haga to keep her guest, Pitto the penguin, out of sight from Mrs. Kakei, the resident tattletale who will report the bird's violation of the pet free apartment building.
| 2 | "The Merchant of Romance"; Transliteration: "Roman no Akindo" (Japanese: 浪漫の商人) | July 12, 2003 |
A wedding chapel that has fallen on hard times struggles to stay in business while its young owner deals with her recent divorce and the burden of keeping her friends employed.
| 3 | "Middle-Aged Teen"; Transliteration: "Oyaji Rō Tīn" (Japanese: おやじローティーン) | July 19, 2003 |
A tough, business-minded father loses his memory and believes he is a teenager. He meets a young school girl and cannot help but become smitten with her.
| 4 | "Hidden in the Pottery"; Transliteration: "Hachi no Naka" (Japanese: 鉢の中) | July 26, 2003 |
Mrs. Asakawa suspects her neighbor of beating her elderly mother-in-law being responsible for the death of her husband. The mystery unfolds when Mrs. Asakawa makes a shocking discovery hidden inside a potted plant.
| 5 | "Aberrant Family F"; Transliteration: "Meisō Kazoku F" (Japanese: 迷走家族F) | August 2, 2003 |
Hazuki's family is virtually in the poorhouse. Therefore, she is shocked when her father decides to go on an expensive family vacation. Soon she suspects that her father's motives may involve a suicide pact for her and her family.
| 6 | "As Long As You Are Here"; Transliteration: "Kimi ga Iru Dake de" (Japanese: 君がいるだけで) | August 9, 2003 |
When Mr. Domoto is laid off of his prestigious job as a salaryman, his wife falls ill and asks him to fill in for her at the convenience store. There, his rough personality doesn't mesh well with his co-workers, but he learns from a hard-working foreigner named Achara to persevere.
| 7 | "One Hundred Years of Love"; Transliteration: "Hyaku-nen no Koi" (Japanese: 百年の恋) | August 16, 2003 |
Risa Hoshino comes back from the dead with amazing telekinetic powers. The old woman develops a crush on another patient and believes him to be the reincarnation of her jilted lover from decades ago.
| 8 | "In Lieu of Thanks"; Transliteration: "Orei ni Kaete" (Japanese: お礼にかえて) | August 23, 2003 |
Mrs. Kobato finds herself in the middle of a battle between the stuck-up Mrs. Shiratori and the elderly Mrs. Ukai, who eventually bring a crab and a bird into the argument.
| 9 | "Living Room Lovesong"; Transliteration: "Chanoma no Rabu Songu" (Japanese: 茶の間のラブソング) | August 30, 2003 |
A middle-aged man loses his wife, yet his wife's soul is bothered by the fact that he does not cry at her funeral. Her spirit soon returns to haunt him as he begins to develop feelings for the young office worker at his company.
| 10 | "House of Garbage"; Transliteration: "Poi no Uchi" (Japanese: ポイの家) | September 6, 2003 |
The Hirooka's front door is mistaken for a garbage drop spot, and when the Boss's wife starts throwing out his favorite things, Ritsuko and Yoshio have to do everything they can to save the tacky items, or risk losing a promotion.
| 11 | "One Day Dream"; Transliteration: "Higaeri no Yume" (Japanese: 日帰りの夢) | September 13, 2003 |
Shinonome is a downtrodden company man who is going through life without finding true happiness. His junior high school reunion soon rolls around and his thoughts turn to a girl he once loved named Shima.
| 12 | "Extra-Large Size Happiness"; Transliteration: "L Saizu no Shiawase" (Japanese: Lサイズの幸福) | September 20, 2003 |
Ryuuichi's mother, Kayoko moves in with her son and his young wife, Hanako. But problems start to arise when Hanako starts behaving oddly and risking the anger of her mother-in-law who they are counting on to invest in their new home. Hanako claims a large spirit is the cause, but only she can see him.
| 13 | "The Executive's Dog"; Transliteration: "Senmu no Inu" (Japanese: 専務の犬) | September 27, 2003 |
The Kogure's are asked to take care of Mr. Matsurida's dog Gorgeous, but when his mistress moves in and the children draw eyebrows on the dog, things become complicated.

=== Drama ===
A two-episode television drama adaptation was broadcast on NHK-BS Premium. The first episode adapted the "Red Bouquet", "Hidden in the Pottery" and "Aberrant Family F" stories, and the second adapted "The Executive's Dog", "Birds of Fate" and "As Long As You Are Here". Both episodes aired on July 8 and July 15, 2012, respectively.

== See also ==
- Rumic World
