= Rumic World =

Japanese manga series

- First tankōbon volume cover

るーみっくわーるど (Rūmikku Wārudo)
- Genre: Comedy
- Manga
- Written by: Rumiko Takahashi
- Published by: Shogakukan
- English publisher: NA: Viz Media
- Magazine: Shōnen Sunday Zōkan
- English magazine: Manga Vizion
- Original run: 1978 – 1983
- Volumes: 3
- Manga

One or Double
- Written by: Rumiko Takahashi
- Published by: Shogakukan
- English publisher: NA: Viz Media
- Magazine: Weekly Shōnen Sunday; Big Comic Spirits; Petit Comic
- Published: September 18, 1995
- Manga

Came the Mirror & Other Tales
- Written by: Rumiko Takahashi
- Published by: Shogakukan
- English publisher: NA: Viz Media
- Magazine: Weekly Shōnen Sunday; Big Comic
- Published: July 17, 2015
- Anime
- Fire Tripper; Maris the Chojo; Laughing Target; Mermaid Forest; Mermaid's Scar
- Related work
- Rumic Theater
- icon

Rumic World (るーみっくわーるど, Rūmikku Wārudo) can refer either to a series of short manga stories written by Rumiko Takahashi or to a series of original video animations (OVAs) based on those stories. Rumic World was later reprinted in Japan as Rumiko Takahashi Masterpiece Collection (高橋留美子傑作短編集, Takahashi Rumiko Kessaku Tanpenshū), and released in English by Viz Media as Rumic World Trilogy. Most of the stories are comedies. The OVAs were released in North American and United Kingdom by Central Park Media and Manga Entertainment.

== Japanese editions ==
The Rumic World stories were originally published separately in various Shogakukan magazines. Rumic World was released twice in Japan, the first edition, Rumic World (るーみっくわーるど, Rūmikku Wārudo), utilized the tankōbon format, and consisted of three volumes:

=== First edition ===
Volume 1

- "Faiyā Torippā" (炎(ファイヤー)トリッパー)
- "Yami o Kakeru Manazashi" (闇をかけるまなざし)
- "Warau Hyōteki" (笑う標的)
- "Wasurete Nemure" (忘れて眠れ)

Volume 2

- "Sengoku Seitokai" (戦国生徒会)
- "Katte na Yatsura" (勝手なやつら)
- "The Supergal" (ザ・超(スーパー)女(ギャル), Za Sūpāgyaru)
- "Gold Finger" (黄金の貧乏神(ゴールド ヒンガー), Gōrudo Hingā)
- "Kaibyō Min" (怪猫・明)
- "Harahara Hall" (腹はらホール)
- "Warae! Helpman" (笑え！ヘルプマン, Warae! Herupuman)
- "Warera Facial Pack" (われら顔面(フェイシャル)仲間(パック), Warera Feisharu Pakku)

Volume 3

- "Fūfu" (ふうふ)
- "Shōkon" (商魂)
- "Dust Spurt" (ダストスパート！！, Dasuto Supāto) (also "Dust Spot!!"; consists of five chapters)

=== Second edition ===
The second edition, [Hozonban] Rūmikku Wārudo Takahashi Rumiko Kessaku Tanpenshū (【保存版】るーみっくわーるど 高橋留美子傑作短編集; lit. "[Collector's Edition] Rumic World: Rumiko Takahashi Masterpiece Short Story Collection"), in wideban format, contained the same stories, reduced into two volumes, with the stories in a different order:

Volume 1

- "Katte na Yatsura" (勝手なやつら)
- "Harahara Hall" (腹はらホール)
- "Gold Finger" (黄金の貧乏神(ゴールド ヒンガー), Gōrudo Hingā)
- "Dust Spurt" (ダストスパート！！, Dasuto Supāto) (also "Dust Spot!!"; consists of five chapters)
- "Shōkon" (商魂)
- "Fūfu" (ふうふ)

Volume 2

- "Faiyā Torippā" (炎(ファイヤー)トリッパー)
- "The Supergirl/Chōjo" (ザ・超(スーパー)女(ギャル), Za Sūpāgyaru)
- "Kaibyō Min" (怪猫・明)
- "Warae! Helpman" (笑え！ヘルプマン, Warae! Herupuman)
- "Sengoku Seitokai" (戦国生徒会)
- "Yami o Kakeru Manazashi" (闇をかけるまなざし)
- "Warau Hyōteki" (笑う標的)
- "Waraete Nemure" (笑えて眠れ)
- "Warera Facial Pack" (われら顔面(フェイシャル)仲間(パック), Warera Feisharu Pakku)

=== One or Double ===
Another collection of similar short stories not included in either of the first two editions, was titled either One or Double (1 or W, Wan oa Daburu), or Rumic World Rumiko Takahashi Presents "The Collection of Short Stories" (【るーみっくわーるど】高橋留美子短編集, Rūmikku Wārudo Takahashi Rumiko Tampenshū). This book also uses the wideban format, and contains the following stories:

- "Slim Kannon" (スリム観音, Surimu Kannon)
- "Inu de Warui ka!!" (犬で悪いか！！)
- "Obāsan to Issho" (お婆さんといっしょ)
- "Gambari Masse" (がんばり末世)
- "Grand Father" (グランド・ファザー, Gurando Fazā)
- "Takarazuka e no Shōtai ~Invitation to Takarazuka~ ("宝塚への招待〜INVITATION TO TAKARAZUKA〜)
- "One or Double" (1 or W, Wan oa Daburu)
- "Happy Talk" (ハッピー・トーク, Happii Tōku)
- "Uchi ga Megami ja!!" (うちが女神じゃ！！, Uchi ga Megami ja!!)

=== Came the Mirror ===
Another collection of similar short stories, titled Came the Mirror (鏡が来た, Kagami ga Kita), was released in 2015 and contains the following stories:

- "Came the Mirror" (鏡が来た, Kagami ga Kita)
- "Revenge Doll" (リベンジドール, Ribenji Dorru)
- "The Star Has a Thousand Faces" (星は千の顔, Hoshi wa Sen no Kao)
- "Lovely Flower" (可愛い花, Kawaii Hana)
- "With Cat" (ウイズキャット, Uizu Kyatto)
- "My Sweet Sunday" (collaboration with Mitsuru Adachi to commemorate the 50th anniversary of Shonen Sunday)

== Translations ==
=== English editions ===
Some of Takahashi's stories were printed in Manga Vizion magazine in a "flipped" style (Note: Text in the Japanese language reads right-to-left so manga artwork is composed right-to-left. For English editions the artwork is often mirrored (flipped) to read left-to-right.) and are no longer in print.

==== Rumic World ====
While Viz Media (as its corporate predecessor VIZ Communications) initially published two Rumic World stories in 1989 and 1990, it published a three volume set of the Rumic World collection in 1997, corresponding to the Japanese editions, with a different order to the stories:

Volume 1 ISBN 9781569311264

- "Fire Tripper": A gas explosion sends young Suzuko and Shuu 500 years into the past.
- "Maris the Chojo": An alien policewoman sees a kidnapped quadrillionaire as her ticket out of debt.
- "Those Selfish Aliens": Aliens, the government, and fishermen implant bombs in a poor individual.
- "Time Warp Trouble": Warriors from feudal Japan inexplicably pop into a modern high-school classroom.
- "The Laughing Target": Azusa will do anything to ensure that Yuzuru stays hers.

Volume 2 ISBN 9781569311943

- "Wasted Minds (Dust Spot)": A five-part miniseries which follows a pair of bickering government agents.
- "The Golden Gods of Poverty": A boy's parents try to use him to make money.
- "The Entrepreneurial Spirit": A woman leads seminars for a get-rich quick scheme.

Volume 3 ISBN 9781569312063

- "That Darn Cat": Rumiko Takahashi takes care of her neighbor's cat.
- "When My Eyes Got Wings": A couple befriends a sickly child with a secret.
- "Wedded Bliss": A wedded couple's only outlet is to fight with one another.
- "Sleep and Forget": A girl relives a past life involving her lover.
- "A Cry for Help": A fairy gives a boy a frightening split personality.
- "War Council": Student councils go to war over a stamp.
- "The Face Pack": A man can change his appearance at will.

==== One or Double ====
Viz Media published a book corresponding to the "One or Double" collection under the title Rumic Theater: One or Double on June 5, 1998. It contained the following stories:

- "Excuse Me for Being a Dog!": A boxer tries to hide the fact that he turns into a dog every time he gets a nose bleed.
- "Winged Victory": A rugby team with 999 losses is cheered on by a ghostly girl .
- "The Grandfather of All Baseball Games": A man wastes the money his grandson makes playing sandlot baseball.
- "The Diet Goddess": A young girl goes through a rigorous training exercise to fit into a dress.
- "Happy Talk": A girl searches for her dead mother, who she thinks might be working as a hostess in Tokyo.
- "One or Double": An accident places the soul of a fanatic kendo coach into his favorite pupil's girlfriend.
- "To Grandmother's House We Go": A woman poses as her dead friend to claim a 500 billion yen inheritance.
- "Reserved Seat": A singer deals with stage fright and memory blackouts after his grandmother dies.
- "Shake Your Buddha": A hilarious debate between the future Buddha and an idiot yam fanatic.

==== Came the Mirror ====
Viz Media published "Came the Mirror" collection under the title Came the Mirror & Other Tales on February 15, 2022.

== See also ==
- Rumic Theater
