= Megan Hollingshead =

American voice actress

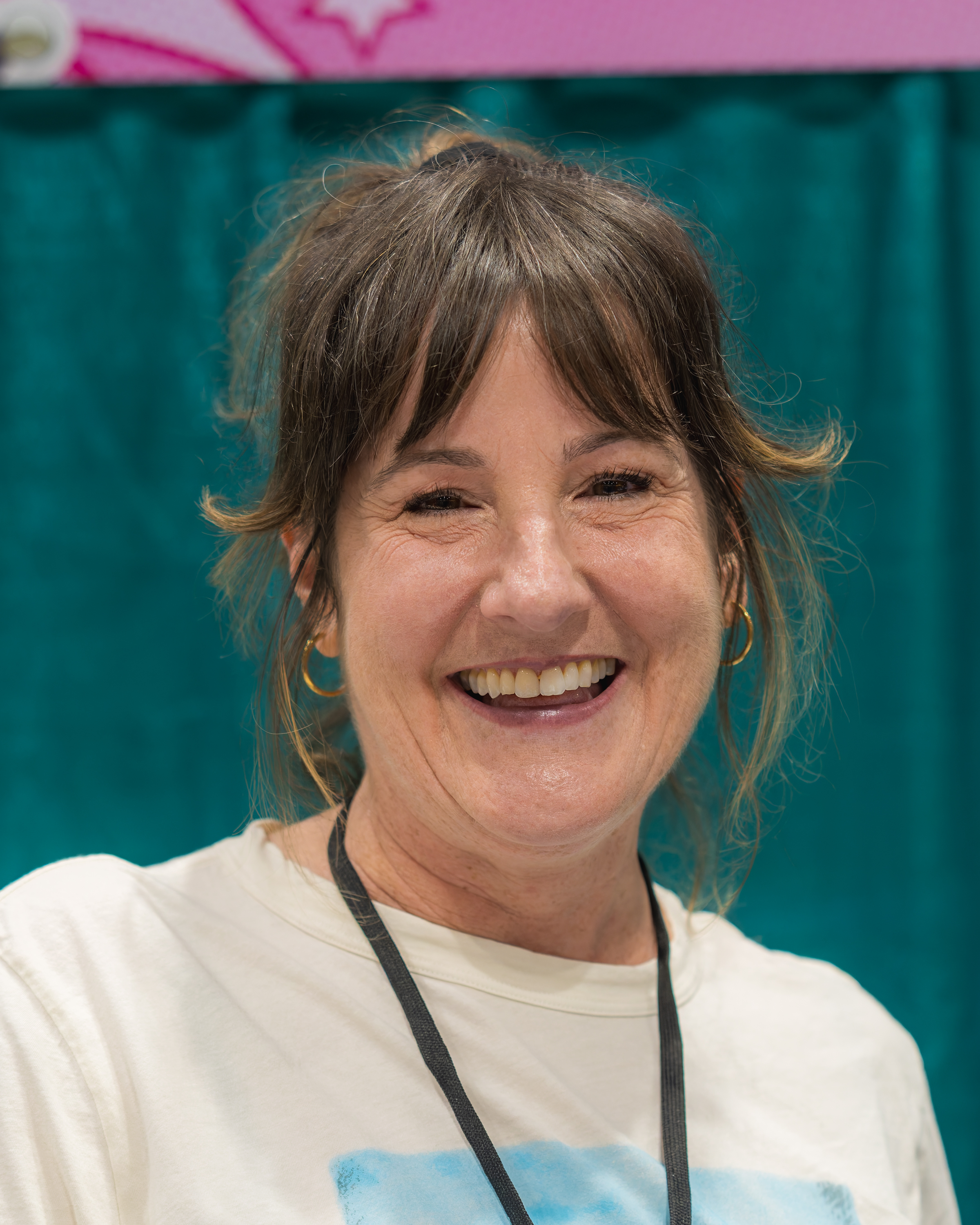
- Hollingshead at Animate! Orlando in 2026
- Born: San Fernando Valley, CA, U.S.
- Other names: Karen Thompson; Kelli Kassidi
- Occupation: Voice actress
- Years active: 1993–present
- Agent: AVO Talent Agency
- Children: 2
- Website: www.meganhollingshead.com

Megan Hollingshead, also known as Karen Thompson or Kelli Kassidi, is an American voice actress, best known for her roles as Nurse Joy in Pokémon, Mai Valentine in Yu-Gi-Oh!, Shizune in Naruto, Caster in Fate/stay night, Rangiku Matsumoto in Bleach, and Re-l Mayer in Ergo Proxy.

== Career ==
Best known for her anime dubbing work, Hollingshead's most famous roles include Nurse Joy, Cassidy in the first 6 seasons of the Pokémon anime series and Mai Valentine in the first 3 seasons of Yu-Gi-Oh! Duel Monsters. She also lent her voice to the Enix role-playing game series Valkyrie Profile as Lenneth. During the start of Pokémon's 7th season, she left New York City to relocate to her new residence in Los Angeles, and continue her voice acting career, voicing characters such as Shizune in Naruto and Naruto Shippuden, Rangiku Matsumoto and Nemu Kurotsuchi in Bleach, Hilda in Eureka Seven, Villetta Nu in the Code Geass series, and Re-l Mayer in Ergo Proxy. Hollingshead's theatre résumé is as extensive, if less so, with roles in performances of The Duchess of Malfi, Baptizing Adam, Spacegrrrls, and Vinegar Tom, to name but a few. Hollingshead studied acting at the William Esper Studio, and is a founding member of the Adirondack Theatre Festival. She serves as a yoga instructor in her spare time. Hollingshead currently resides in Nashville, Tennessee with her family.

== Filmography ==
=== Anime ===
List of voice performances in anime
Year	Title	Role	Notes	Ref(s)
1998–2004, 2020–2023	Pokémon	Nurse Joy, Cassidy, Duplica, others		
2001	Boogiepop Phantom	Various characters		
2001–2004	Yu-Gi-Oh! Duel Monsters	Mai Valentine		
2002	His and Her Circumstances	Kano Miyazama		
2003	Sonic X	Scarlet Garcia		
2003	Shaman King	Jenny, Sharona		
2003	Mermaid Forest	Mana	as Karen Thompson	
2003	Fighting Foodons	Rose Marinade		
2003	Tama and Friends	Various characters		
2003	Ultimate Muscle	Trixie, Helga		
2004	Paranoia Agent	Various characters	First role since relocating to Los Angeles.	
2004	Rumiko Takahashi Anthology	Various characters		
2004	Gravitation	Various characters		
2005	Samurai Champloo	Koiko		
2005	Daphne in the Brilliant Blue	Gloria		
2005	Gankutsuou: The Count of Monte Cristo	Teresa, Marie		
2005	Mars Daybreak	Dr. Sala		
2005	Shingu: Secret of the Stellar Wars	Setsuna Subaru		
2005	Girls Bravo	Maharu, Ebi		
2005	DearS	Neneko		
2005	Idaten Jump	Vaugnnie C, others		
2006	Ergo Proxy	Re-L Mayer		
2006	IGPX	Judy		
2006	Ghost in the Shell	Various characters		
2007	Higurashi When They Cry	Mion Sonozaki, Shion Sonozaki		
2007–2009	Naruto	Shizune, Tonton		
2007–2014	Bleach	Rangiku, Nemu		
2008	Lucky Star	Gotoza-sama		
2008	Gurren Lagann	Adiane		
2008	Eureka Seven	Hilda		
2008–2009	Code Geass	Villetta Nu		
2014–2015	Fate/stay night: Unlimited Blade Works	Caster		
2021	Shaman King	Tao Ran		
2022–present	Bleach: Thousand-Year Blood War	Rangiku, Nemu		

=== Animation ===
List of voice performances in animation
Year	Title	Role	Notes	Ref(s)
2003	Teenage Mutant Ninja Turtles	Sydney, Dr. Ellen		
2003	Cubix	Raska		

=== Film ===
Year	Title	Role	Notes	Source
1999	Pokémon: The First Movie	Nurse Joy		
2003	Pokémon Heroes	Annie, others		
2004	Pokémon: Jirachi—Wish Maker	Diane		
2006	Patlabor: The Movie	Shinobu Nagumo	Bandai dub	
2006	Patlabor 2: The Movie	Shinobu Nagumo	Bandai dub	
2009	Eureka Seven: Good Night, Sleep Tight, Young Lovers	Hilda		
2014	The Last: Naruto the Movie	Shizune		
2017	Fate/stay night: Heaven's Feel I. presage flower	Caster		
2019	Case Closed: The Fist of Blue Sapphire	Sherilyn Tan		

=== Video games ===
List of voice performances in game
Year	Title	Role	Notes	Ref(s)
1999	Valkyrie Profile	Lenneth Valkyrie, Lorenta		
2004	Yu-Gi-Oh! Capsule Monster Coliseum	Mai Valentine		
2005	Romancing Saga	Sif	Uncredited (Note: Voice actor credits were not provided in this game)	Resume
2006	Time Crisis 4	Elizabeth Conway	As Karen Thompson	
2006	Valkyrie Profile 2: Silmeria	Lenneth Valkyrie		
2007	Eternal Sonata	Viola	as Karen Thompson	
2007	Resident Evil: The Umbrella Chronicles	Ada Wong		
2009	Star Ocean: Second Evolution	Celine Jules	as Allison Hollingshead	
2009	Undead Knights	Sylvia		
2009	Brütal Legend	Battle Nuns		
2010	Final Fantasy XIII	Cocoon Inhabitants		
2010	Valkyria Chronicles II	Edy Nelson		
2010	Megamind	Roxanne Ritchi		
2011	Warhammer 40,000: Dawn of War II – Retribution	Autarch Kayleth		
2011	Naruto Shippuden: Ultimate Ninja Impact	Shizune		
2011	Saints Row: The Third	Kiki DeWynter		
2012	Naruto Shippuden: Ultimate Ninja Storm Generations	Shizune		
2012	Guild Wars 2	Glenna		
2013	Naruto Shippuden: Ultimate Ninja Storm 3	Shizune		
2013	Drakengard 3	Five		
2013	Akiba's Trip: Undead & Undressed	Shion Kasugai	Uncredited	
2017	Fire Emblem Heroes	Sigrun, Ylgr, Yune		
2023	Fire Emblem Engage	Eve		
2025	Xenoblade Chronicles X: Definitive Edition	Mia		
