= Laughing Target =

Japanese manga by Rumiko Takahashi and its anime

- Cover from the VHS release of Laughing Target original video animation

笑う標的 (Warau Hyōteki)
- Genre: Horror
- Manga
- Written by: Rumiko Takahashi
- Published by: Shogakukan
- English publisher: NA: Viz Media
- Magazine: Shōnen Sunday Zōkan
- Published: February 1983
- Original video animation
- Directed by: Motosuke Takahashi
- Produced by: Yuji Nunokawa
- Written by: Tomoko Konparu; Hideo Takayashiki
- Music by: Kuni Kawachi
- Studio: Studio Pierrot
- Licensed by: NA: Central Park Media; UK: Manga Entertainment
- Released: March 21, 1987
- Runtime: 45 minutes
- icon

Laughing Target (笑う標的, Warau Hyōteki) is a Japanese manga by Rumiko Takahashi published in February 1983 issue of Shōnen Sunday Zōkan. The manga was later compiled in Rumic World books, which are available in English from Viz Media. It was adapted into an anime OVA released in 1987. A subtitled VHS release was published in North America by US Manga Corps on April 7, 1993. An English dub was produced by Manga UK.

== Plot ==
The main character of the series is Yuzuru Shiga, one of the descendants of the expiring Shiga clan along with his cousin Azusa Shiga, the daughter of his father's older sister. In order to preserve the family legacy, Azusa's mother and Yuzuru's father agree to have cousins Azusa and Yuzuru marry each other when they are of age. Ten years later, Azusa's mother dies and Azusa goes to live with Yuzuru's family. Azusa fully intends on claiming that promise of marriage from Yuzuru in spite of it being wrought during their childhood. She has been waiting, faithful, not so as much speaking to another boy since that time. Yuzuru, however, has his own life as a high school student: He's the captain of the archery club, and he has a girlfriend named Satomi.

Even though Yuzuru has paid no heed to the betrothal, Azusa has taken it very seriously and expects Yuzuru to fulfill their family expectations. When he was a child, Yuzuru also promised her directly that he’d stay with her, and she took it to heart. When Azusa sees Yuzuru with Satomi, she tries to scare Satomi off in the hope that Yuzuru will return to her; but instead, he goes back to Satomi. Azusa then decides she has to take care of Satomi permanently. And that’s no idle threat because, unknown to Yuzuru, Azusa is a demon because of a family curse, which first manifested itself after Azusa killed a group of boys who tried to rape her.

Satomi tries to tell Yuzuru that Azusa is after her, but she can’t do it directly because Azusa is stalking her. Worse yet, Yuzuru, while aware that something strange is going on, is somewhat oblivious to Azusa’s actions.

== Characters ==
Yuzuru Shiga (志賀 譲, Shiga Yuzuru)
Voiced by: Tsubasa Shioya (Japanese), Richard Pearce (English)
The protagonist. He is the son of a branch family of the Shiga clan and is Azusa’s cousin and fiancé. A high school student, he serves as the captain of the kyudo (archery) club. He is more romantically interested in Satomi than Azusa, dismissing his childhood engagement as a relic of the past. However, this indifference ultimately leads to tragedy.

Azusa Shiga (志賀 梓, Shiga Azusa)
Voiced by: Hiromi Tsuru (Japanese), Stacey Gregg (English)
The heroine. The only daughter of the Shiga main family, she has been Yuzuru’s fiancée since the age of six. Since childhood, she has been possessed by "demons" (their true nature is unclear, but they resemble malevolent spirits; her mother describes them as "hungry ghosts swarming over dead flesh"). Whenever someone interferes with Azusa or poses a threat, these entities appear from nowhere to destroy them. Because she has spent her entire life devoted only to Yuzuru, she has never even spoken to other boys her age. She views Satomi as an obstacle and attempts to attack her.

Satomi (里美)
Voiced by: Iyo Matsumoto (Japanese), Theresa Gallagher (English)
A member of the kyudo club and Yuzuru’s girlfriend. She is repeatedly threatened by Azusa to break up with him and is nearly killed toward the end of the story. While she is ultimately rescued by Yuzuru, the OVA version suggests that the "demons" erased her existence by traveling back into the past.

Azusa's Mother (梓の母)
Voiced by: Toshiko Sawada
The head of the Shiga main family. She unilaterally arranged the engagement between her daughter and her nephew, Yuzuru. Although she was aware that her daughter was possessed by demons, her concern for the family's reputation and social standing kept her silent. Driven by fear of the entities, she eventually attempted a forced double suicide with Azusa, only to be possessed and killed by the demons. To the public, her death was regarded as a mysterious incident of unknown causes.

Yuzuru's Father (譲の父)
Voiced by: Takahiro Hirai
The younger brother of Azusa’s mother. He initially opposed the engagement of his young son to Azusa, feeling it was too early, but his sister forced the arrangement. Following his sister's death, he has no intention of succeeding the Shiga main family and plans to liquidate the estate while taking Azusa in. He is left bewildered when Azusa insists that she will marry Yuzuru and take over the family headship herself.

== Compilation ==
The story was compiled along with other Rumic World stories in tankōbon's twice.

No.	Title	Release date	ISBN
1	Takahashi Rumiko Tanpenshū: Rūmikku Wārudo 1 (高橋留美子短編集 るーみっくわーるど1)	May 1984	4-09-121851-2

No.	Title	Release date	ISBN
2	Takahashi Rumiko Kessaku Tanpenshū 2 (高橋留美子傑作短編集2)	February 18, 1995	4-09-121857-1

== OVA Adaptation ==
Released on March 21, 1987, as the third installment in the OVA series Rumic World (るーみっくわーるど), titled "The Laughing Target," it garnered attention for featuring then-popular idol Iyo Matsumoto as a voice actress. However, the ending is even more tragic and hopeless than the manga. It was also released in the United States by Central Park Media, but the distribution rights were later terminated.

The opening theme is Impact (インパクト) by Hiroe Oka, and the ending theme is Be Passionate (Beパッショネート) by the same artist.

== Reception ==
On Anime News Network, Justin Sevakis said the anime "isn't perfect, but it's thoroughly engrossing".
