= Yuji Nunokawa =

Japanese anime producer, animator and director (1947–2022)

- 布川ゆうじ
- Nunokawa in 2015
- Born: Yuji Nunokawa (布川 郁司, Nunokawa Yūji); 11 February 1947; Sakata, Yamagata Prefecture, Japan
- Died: 25 December 2022 (aged 75)
- Other name: Yû Sakata
- Employers: TCJ (1967–1968); Nakamura Production (1968–1969); Mushi Production (1969–1970); Wako Productions (1970–1971); Tatsunoko Production (1971–1979); Pierrot (1979–2022)

Yuji Nunokawa (Japanese: 布川 ゆうじ, Hepburn: Nunokawa Yūji; (born Japanese: 布川 郁司, romanized: Nunokawa Yūji), 11 February 1947 – 25 December 2022) was a Japanese anime producer, animator and director.

== Life and career ==
Born in Sakata, Yamagata to a family of tailors, Nunokawa studied at the Nippon Design Welfare College, graduating in 1967. He made his professional debut as a colorist for an Eiken subsidiary. He then worked as a freelancer animator and a technical director at several anime production companies, notably Mushi Production and Tatsunoko Production. He was key animator for Robotan, and he made his directorial debut in 1975 with the series Time Bokan.

In 1979 Nunokawa decided to establish his own company, and founded Studio Pierrot, which in a few years got a string of successes, including Creamy Mami, Kimagure Orange Road, Naruto, YuYu Hakusho, Bleach, Tokyo Ghoul. He also served as chairman of the Association of Japanese Animations from 2009 to 2014.

During his career Nunokawa received various awards and honours, notably the Commissioner for Cultural Affairs Award and the Blue Ribbon Medal of Honor. He died on 25 December 2022, at the age of 75.
