= Inuyasha: Secret of the Divine Jewel =

2007 video game

- Developers: Art Co., Ltd; Frontier Groove, Inc.
- Publisher: Namco Bandai Games
- Composer: Tsutomu Fuzawa
- Platform: Nintendo DS
- Release: NA: January 23, 2007
- Genre: Role-playing
- Mode: Single-player

Inuyasha: Secret of the Divine Jewel is a role-playing video game (RPG) for the Nintendo DS. It was based on the anime series Inuyasha, and it leads into Inuyasha: The Final Act. It was developed by Art Co., Ltd and Frontier Groove, Inc and published by Namco Bandai Games. It was released in North America on January 23, 2007.

== Story ==
It started that it's Kagome Higurashi's last year of her middle school. Janis is a student who had transferred from the United States, living in Japan for the second time (explaining how she can speak Japanese right away). First, she has a strange dream from the memories of the past in the Heian period. She was forced to move back after her father had yet another job transfer. It is in present-day Japan where she meets Kagome. The two become fast friends. One day, Kagome is absent from school and Janis goes to check on her. Soon after she reaches the Higurashi Shrine, she is attacked by a demon and is almost killed. Janis is rescued, however, by a dark magical mask-wearing priest named Sen (or Monk Sen). He tells her that her destiny lies on the other side of the Bone Eater's Well. In the Sengoku period, she is reunited with Kagome and the others.

Something strange happens though. She touches a Shikon Jewel fragment and it melts into her body. According to Monk Sen, Janis possesses a divine spiritual power called Kamuitama, and says that she is the daughter of Kamui. The fragment inside Janis is even undetectable by Kagome. Janis joins the others in a quest to return the Kamuitama to the one who previously possessed it, a god known as Datara. Only then will she be able to remove the fragment and rid herself of the great power that makes her a target for demons.

== Characters ==
- Janis: A human girl from the modern era who becomes friends with Kagome in the game. Janis is an American and maybe the reincarnation of the wife of the god Datara, later the reincarnation Tsugumi and Datara's demigod child in the Heian period. When Kagome is absent from school, Janis goes to Higurashi shrine to visit Kagome where she is attacked by a demon who emerges from the Bone Eater's Well. Rescued by the mysterious Monk Sen, Janis follows his advice to go to the feudal era through the well and look for Kagome. After passing through, she meets Kagome and her friends. Once she touches a shard of the sacred Jewel of Four Souls, it blends in with her body and awakens her inherent Kamui powers. She agrees to accompany them on their journey until she is able to remove the Jewel fragment from her body.
- Lord Gorai: The infamous Lord of the Northern Lands. He is a powerful half cat-demon who sought the Demon Mask 500 years before the main storyline, and used the mask to control the god Datara. After an encounter with InuYasha's group, Gorai grants them safe passage through the mountains.
- Kagome Higurashi: Kagome Higurashi is a human who becomes Janis's friend. She had lived in the Higurashi Shrine until Janis, Inuyasha, Miroku, Sango and Shippō went on the journey to remove the Shikon Jewel Shard from Janis's body. Being the reincarnation of the Sengoku period priestess Kikyō, she is a skilled archer and harbors romantic feelings for Inuyasha.
- Inuyasha: A half demon born to a human mother and dog-demon father, Inuyasha is quick-tempered and always ready for a fight. Due to Inuyasha's impatience and short temper, the Beads of Subjugation were placed on him, allowing Kagome to make him fall on his face by uttering "sit". He carries the deadly sword Tetsusaiga. He holds feelings for both Kagome, and his former love, Kikyō.
- Shippō: Orphaned due to demons who sought shards of the Shikon Jewel, young fox demon Shippō has taken to living with Inuyasha's group, seeing them as a surrogate family. When it comes to combat, Shippō lacks any real effective techniques to wound others, mostly due to his age and his kind being mostly skilled in trickery to evade and confuse enemies.
- Miroku: Miroku is a monk, whose family lineage was cursed by Naraku to bear the Wind Tunnel until no one remained; all who have the Wind Tunnel will eventually be sucked into it. Unbecoming of a monk, Miroku is a swindler and, for the most part, a peerless womanizer; however, he does possess great spiritual powers, and is quite intelligent. Miroku is in love with Sango.
- Sango: Sango is one of the survivors of the Village of Demon Slayers. She employs a giant boomerang made of purified demon bones, known as Hiraikotsu, as her main weapon. Sango is quite knowledgeable about demons, knowing a variety of poisons and techniques that are effective against them. She has feelings for Miroku, but often slaps him for his lecherous actions.
- Naraku: The demonic mastermind behind the tragedies, which the memories of that torment Inuyasha, Miroku and Sango. Not willing to put his own life on the line, Naraku rarely appears before his enemies in person; he often uses a demon puppet in his place to communicate with his enemies. Naraku appears interested in the Kamui power that Janis possesses.

== Gameplay ==
Secret of the Divine Jewel has a turn based battle system, where each character in the player's party takes a turn attacking, guarding, using items, or escaping. It also has a character development system, where the characters gain experience to level up and become more powerful. When not battling, the player is free to roam around the map or continue with the story and move on to his or her next objective.

== Reception ==
Reception

Aggregate score
Aggregator	Score
Metacritic	46/100

Review scores
Publication	Score
GameSpot	3.9/10
GameSpy	2/5
GamesRadar+	2/5
GameZone	7.5/10
IGN	4/10
Nintendo Power	6/10
X-Play	3/5

The game received "generally unfavorable reviews" according to video game review aggregator Metacritic. IGN gave the game a 4/10 score. They criticized the game for being a shameless insult to the fans of the original show as well as the focus on the original character Janis, though they praised the graphics and the storyline.
