= Ross Douglas =

Canadian actor (1951–2023)

- Born: February 22, 1951; Vancouver, British Columbia, Canada
- Died: March 20, 2023 (aged 72)
- Occupation: Voice actor
- Years active: 1979–2023

Ross Douglas (February 22, 1951 – March 20, 2023) was a Canadian voice actor and musician with Ocean Studios in Vancouver, British Columbia. He was most well-known for voicing Jean Bison in the Sly Cooper series, Daniel O'Connell in Master Keaton, and Kageyama in the Black Lagoon series. He also voiced The Caped Cod in Spy Fox 2: Some Assembly Required

Douglas died on March 20, 2023, at the age of 72.

== Roles ==
=== Television ===
- Black Lagoon as Kageyama
- Inuyasha as Goryomaru (Eps, 166-167)
- Inuyasha: The Final Act as Goryomaru (Ep. 1), Moryomaru
- MegaMan NT Warrior as Torchman
- Mobile Suit Gundam as The Narrator
- Master Keaton as Daniel O'Connell
- Project ARMS as Keith Blue
- Smallville as Skeets
- The 4400 as Gregory Kensington
- The Little Prince as Bamako (The Planet of the Amicopes)
- The Story of Saiunkoku as Shin Sai

=== Video games ===
- Mobile Suit Gundam: Encounters in Space as Bask Om and Narrator
- Nancy Drew: The Creature of Kapu Cave as Big Island Mike
- Sly 2: Band of Thieves as Jean Bison
- The Suffering as Clem
- Spy Fox 2: Some Assembly Required as The Caped Cod
