= The Little Prince (2010 TV series) =

2010 animated television series

- English title card
- Genre: Action; Adventure
- Based on: The Little Prince by: Antoine de Saint-Exupéry
- Written by: Christel Gonnard
- Directed by: Pierre Alain Chartier
- Voices of: Gabriel Bismuth Bienaimé; Franck Capillery; Guillaume Gallienne; Marie Gillain
- Composer: Frédéric Talgorn
- Countries of origin: France; India; Italy; Switzerland; Luxembourg; Germany
- Original languages: French; Italian; German
- No. of seasons: 3
- No. of episodes: 78 (list of episodes)

Production
- Executive producer: Cédric Pilot
- Producers: Aton Soumache; Alexis Vonarb; Dimitri Rassam; Cédric Pilot
- Running time: 26 minutes
- Production companies: Method Animation; DQ Entertainment; Rai Fiction; LP Animation; La Fabrique D'Images; Sony Pictures Home Entertainment (seasons 1–2); AB Productions (season 3); ARD; SES S.A.

Original release
- Network: France 3 (France); TSR (Switzerland); Rai 2 (Italy, seasons 1–2); Rai Yoyo (Italy, season 3)
- Release: December 24, 2010 – December 20, 2015

The Little Prince (French: Le Petit Prince; Italian: Il piccolo principe) is an animated children's television series inspired by Antoine de Saint-Exupéry's novel The Little Prince that debuted in December of 2010. The series was created by Method Animation and the Saint-Exupéry-d'Agay Estate, in co-production with LPPTV, Sony Pictures Home Entertainment, Fabrique D'Images, DQ Entertainment and ARD, in participation with France Télévisions, WDR, Rai Fiction, Télévision Suisse Romande and satellite operator SES S.A.

It was produced by Aton Soumache, Alex Vonarb, Dimitri Rassam and Cedric Pilot, co-produced by Jean-Marie Musique, Christine Parisse and Tapaas Chakravarti, and developed for television by Matthieu Delaporte and Alexandre de la Patelliere with Romain Van Leimt. Main character creation and adaptation was done by Bertrand Catignol, with art direction by Gabriel Villate and Pierre-Alain Chartier. Storyboard supervision was done by Augusto Zanovello and Jean Charles Andre, and script edition by Christel Gonnard. The original score for the series was composed, orchestrated and arranged by Frederic Talgorn, and performed by WDR Rundfunkorchester Köln.

The series aired in over 150 markets around the world. It was distributed as 36 mini-movies, each encompassing an individual story line, as well as 78 half-hour episodes, where those story arcs are split into multiple parts. An English version, created by Ocean Productions, began airing in Canada on TVOntario on November 6, 2011. It also began airing on Knowledge Network on January 8, 2012. In Australia, it began airing on ABC3 on August 19, 2012. In the United States, the series launched alongside Primo TV on January 16, 2017. Clips of the series are available online on YouTube.

== Cast ==
=== Main characters ===
- Le Petit Prince by Gabriel Bismuth (French) The Little Prince by Aidan Drummond (English) abbreviated in closed captions simply as Prince.
- Le Renard by Franck Capillery (French) The Fox by Brian Drummond (English) abbreviated in closed captions simply as Fox (his wife Laura voices Turquoise in "The Planet of Ludokaa.").
- Le Serpent by Guillaume Gallienne (French) The Snake by Paul Dobson (English) abbreviated in closed captions simply as Snake.
- La Rose by Marie Gillain (French) The Rose by Sarah Edmondson (English) abbreviated in closed captions simply as Rose.

=== Supporting characters ===
==== B planet characters ====
B 546 episodes 1–2, The Planet of Time:

- Caracatus by Brian Dobson (English)
- The Great Timekeeper by French Tickner (English)

B 311 episodes 3–4, The Planet of the Firebird:

- Princess Feng by Kira Tozer (English) the twin sister and only sibling of Huang, imprisoned by her own brother.
- Prince Huang by Ian Hanlin (English) a prince who stole a crown from the Fire Bird to claim kingship. (spelled Wong in closed captions)
- Shin-Joh by Alistair Abell (English) a stone-cutter (spelled Shinjo and Shinjoh in closed captions).

B 222 episodes 5–6, The Planet of Wind:

- Zephir by Amitai Marmorstein (spelled Zéphyr in description) the son of the governor, musician.
- The Governor of the Winds by Ron Halder (name later revealed to be Elus).
- Foehn by Shawn Macdonald (spelled Fayne in closed captions) the first person Prince and Fox meet.
- The Lieutenant by Andy Toth

B 678 episodes 7–8, The Planet of Music:

- Semitone by Matthew Erickson (English) works in the instrument factory testing for Dissonance.
- Euphony by Lara Gilchrist (English) a singing diva in love with Ivory.
- Otto by Jason Simpson (English) in charge of the instrument factory (spelled Auto in the closed captions).
- Ivory by Scott Roberts (English) Anemone's son, in love with Euphony.
- Anemone by Linda Darlow (English) Queen of the Pistilaries and Ivory's mother (closed captions in episode one has Snake call her An Enemy).

D 455 episodes 9–10, The Planet of Astronomer/The Star Snatcher's Planet:

- Antoine, the astronomer by Michael Adamthwaite
- Claos by Michael Shepherd the adoptive father of Antoine (also spelled Klaus or Claus in closed captions)
- Ted by Ellen Kennedy
- Naomie by David A. Kaye the adoptive mother of Antoine (also spelled Naomi in closed captions)

B 356 episodes 11–12, The Planet of Jade:

- Onyx by Kristie Marsden
- Mica by Brad Swaile
- Nickel by Cole Howard
- Jade by Nicole Oliver

B 370 episodes 13–14, Planet of the Globies:

- Fovea by Kathleen Barr
- Felix by Sam Duke
- Laudion by Richard Newman
- Felina by Rebecca Shoichet
- Ferdinand by Paul Hudson

D 333 episodes 15–16, The Planet of Amicopes:

- Brooklyn by Kazumi Evans (English)
- Sahara by Matt Hill (English)
- Opera by Kathy Morse (English)
- Bamako by Ross Douglas (English)

D 444 episodes 17–18, The Planet of Gehom/Gehom's Planet:

- Shania by Ashleigh Ball
- Griffin by Mark Oliver
- Erwan by Kathy Morse
- Gehom by Michael Dobson

W 5613 episodes 19–20, The Planet of Traniacs:

- Marieke by Venus Terzo (English) the painter wife of Hannibal.
- Hannibal by Dale Wilson (English) the train master.
- Rosetta by Carol-Anne Day (English) the daughter of Hannibal and Marieke, Manuel's lover.
- Manuel by Ryan Luhning (English) Hannibal's apprentice, Rosetta's lover.

J 603 episodes 21–23, The Planet of Bubble Gob:

- Oddzn'end by Jonathan Love (English) has crush on Ilnios.
- Ilnios by Saffron Henderson (English) has crush on Oddzn'end.
- Captain by Scott McNeil (English)
- The Great Inventor by Paul Hudson (English) inventor of Bubble Gob.

B 723 episodes 24–25, The Planet of Carapodes:

- Atsign by Alessandro Juliani (English) has magical bond with carapods.
  - Ambrosia an girl on Atsign's route who he talks to, she has a little brother. Later goes to visit Miney, revealed to have a sick father and a member of the Whatis, though it is not clear how she crossed the desert. Her name is not revealed until the end, when Atsign mentions seeing her uncle.
  - Mother of son a woman who finds out he got a promotion and bought a green suit.
- Eenymeeny by Richard Ian Cox (English) a gambler and father of Mo.
  - Miney, the mother of Mo.
  - Mo, the son of Eenymeeny and Miney, expecting a letter from his girlfriend.
- Philatello by Don Brown (English) runs the post office.
- Zig by Trevor Devall (English) runs the circus, including an old tiger named Archibald.

B 782 episode 26–27, The Planet of Giant:

- Click by Matt Ellis
- Talamus by Andrea Libman
- Natura by Jonathan Holmes

B 743 episodes 28–29, The Planet of Ludokaa:

- Snow by Evan Ince
- Saphyra by Jennifer Cameron (English)
- Turquoise by Laura Drummond (English) (her husband Brian voices The Fox.)
- Marine by John Novak (English)
- Foam by John Murphy (English)
- Horizon by Valin Shinyei (English)

H 108 episodes 30–31, The Planet of Lacrimavoras:

- Solitas
- Anima

C 669 episodes 32–33, The Planet of Coppelius:

- characters TBA

C 0101 episodes 34–35, La planète des Okidiens (translated The Planet of the Okidians):

- Okada by Maïté Monceau (French) she is the queen of the planet, she was tricked by the snake to destroy the planet.
- Okimi by Chloé Renaud (French) She is the princess of the planet, she loves her late father and is upset not to give up to be the new queen.

A 42692 episodes 36–37, The Planet of Libris:

- Myriad by Andrea Libman (English)
- Balthazar by Matt Ellis (English)
- Joseph by Trevor Devall (English)
- Anatol by Jonathan Holmes (English)
- Flora by Jillian Michaels (English)

C 333 episode 38–39, The Planet of Cublix:

- Linea (aka Lenaya in closed captions) by Chantal Strand
- Lux by Mark Acheson
- Hexahedron by Shawn Macdonald
- Alumnix by Scott Perrie

D 555 episodes 40–41, The Planet of Ashkabaar:

- characters TBA

X 442 episodes 42–44, La planète du Gargand (called The Planet of the Gargand in English dub, or The Planet of Gargand on guides):

- Dokan by James Beach
- Thery by Brian Doe (English)
- Jouna by Shannon Chan-Kent
- Lyl by Willow Johnson

B 901 episodes 45–46, The Planet of the Grand Buffoon:

- characters TBA

Z 222 episodes 47–49, The Planet of the Bamalias:

- Kimi by Maryke Hendrikse (English)

==== Multi-planet arc characters ====
Storylines in the second season are original stories that build upon multiple planets addressed individually in season 1 interacting together.

B 325 > B 330 > B 505 episodes ??-?? The New Mission:

- The Hunter by Lee Tockar (English)
- The Geographer by Tim Dixon (English)
- The King by Colin Murdock (English)
- Minizabit by ?
- The businessman by ?
- The Aviator by Christopher Gaze (English)

B 311 > D555 episodes ??-?? The Planet of the Ice Bird (based on The Planet of Ashkabaar by Heloise Cappoccia & Christel Connard and The Planet of the Firebird by Julien Magnat)

- Tamaaz by David A. Kaye
- Aliiz by Jaimie Mortimer-Lamb
- Shaaz by Kelly Sheridan
- Zaac by Ian Hanlin
- The Geographer by Tim Dixon

D455 > W5613 episodes ??-?? The Planet of the Astrotrainiacs (based on The Planet of the Trainiacs by An Keo and The Star Snatcher's Planet by Thomas Barichella)

- Raoul by Rebecca Shoichet
- Gaspard by Brayden Herbert
- The School Teacher by Cathy Weseluck
- The Astronomer by Michael Adamwaite
- The Geographer by Tim Dixon

D 333 > C 669 episodes ??-?? The Planet of the Oracle (based on The Planet of Coppelius by Otto Carlo Rino and The Planet of the Amicopes by Heloise Cappocia)

- Coppelius by Trevor Devall (English) is the Oracle's (and Solaris') king
- Excello by Simon Hayama (English) described by the Little Prince as "the engineer from the Planet of the Solaris" and by Fox as "my friend Entelio's father"
  - Antellio or Entelio is the son of Excello and friend of Fox.
- The Oracle by Ellen Kennedy (English) wears a giant eye-shaped mask and has a wall of television monitors. They are connected to Eavesdroppers, winged cameras, belonging to Coppelius. The Snake attempts to influence her.
- The Geographer by Tim Dixon (English) is a recurring ally stored in the Little Prince's sketchpad

C 669 > B 901 episodes ??-?? The Planet of the Grelon (based on The Planet of the Grand Buffoon by Thierry Gaudin and The Planet of Coppelius by Otto Carlo Rino)

- Muche-Muche by Michael Adamthwaite (English) the husband of Tulip, son-in-law of the Grand Buffoon, father of Ballotin
- Tulip by Cheryl McMaster (English) the daughter of the Grand Buffoon, wife of Muche-Muche, mother of Ballotin
- Ballotin by Griffin Kingston (English) the son of Muche-Muche and Tulio, grandson of the grand buffoon
- The Grand Buffoon by Michael Shepherd
- Swindly (and The Hunter, returning) by Lee Tockar
  - Swindly's Herald: ?
- The Geographer by Tim Dixon
- The King by Colin Murdock
- Captain Of The Guard: ?
- Grelon, the pet of Ballotin (revealed to be Tolben who Little Prince met in Planet of Coppelius arc): ?
- Visconti: ?

D 0101 > B 743 episodes ??-?? The Planet of the Crystal Tears (based on The Planet of Ludokaa by Clelia Constantine and The Planet of the Okidiens by Christel Gonnard and Therry Gaudin)

- Foam by John Murphy (English)
- Marine by John Novak (English)
- Okoda by Cathy Weseluck (English)
- The White Tigerman by Andrew Kavadas (English)
- The Businessman by Andrew Cownden (English)
- The King by Colin Murdock (English)

D0101 > B782 episodes ??-?? The Planet of the Giant Comet (based on The Planet of the Giant by Gilles Adrien & Alain Broders and The Planet of the Okidiens by Thierry Gaudin & Christel Gonnard)

- Natura by Brenna O'Brien
- Jojo by Grady Ainscough
- Talamus by James Kirk
- Click by Andrew Kavadas
- The Geographer by Tim Dixon

X 000 > B222 episodes ??-?? The Planet of the Nymphalidae (based on The Planet of the Winds by Delphine Dubos and The Planet of the Snake by Julien Magnat)

- Breeze by Maryke Hendrikse (English)
- Foehn by Shawn Macdonald (English)
- Eolus by Ron Halder (English)
- The Lieutenant by Andy Toth (English)
- Dryas by Kirby Morrow (English)
- Callisthea by Janyse Jaud (English)
- The Hunter by Lee Tockar (English)

== Production ==
In October 2008, France Télévisions announced that it had acquired the rights to adapt The Little Prince into an animated series for broadcast in 2010 on France 3. A year later, it was revealed that Method Animation would produce the €18.4 million computer animated series alongside Sony Pictures Home Entertainment, La Fabrique d’Images, DQ Entertainment, ARD and Rai Fiction. A stereoscopic 3D version was also confirmed.

Initially, the series was envisioned as part of a media franchise, with Microsoft Studios set to publish an Xbox 360 video game adaptation developed by Paris-based game developer MKO Games. Sometime in 2010, the project was cancelled after two prototypes were completed.

After three years of development, the 52 x 26-minute series held its premiere at MIPJunior in October 2010. Pierre Alain Chartier directed the show, with a crew of 450 people. Alexandre de la Patelliere and Matthieu Delaporte developed the novel for television. The series debuted in France during the 2010 Christmas holidays. The French version features an opening theme song performed by Yannick Noah. The latter 26 episodes were made available in early 2012.

In 2012, it was confirmed that the show had been renewed for a third season. In conjunction with the production, Method Animation and PGS Entertainment launched a global drawing competition to create a new planet to be featured in the episodes. The season would later premiere in France in 2014.

== Episodes ==
Season	Episodes	Originally released	
Season	Episodes	First released	Last released
1	23	December 24, 2010	December 24, 2011
2	29	February 20, 2012	May 1, 2013
3	26	December 24, 2014	December 20, 2015

== Book series ==
A comic book adaptation with at least 22 issues has been created. The graphic novel books compile the stories which were spread over 2 or 3 episodes, and do not present them in the order that the TV series does.

1. Book 1: The Planet of Wind released August 8 or October 1, 2012
2. Book 2: The Planet of the Firebird released August 8 or October 1, 2012
3. Book 3: The Planet of Music released September 5 or October 1, 2012
4. Book 4: The Planet of Jade released September 5 or October 1, 2012
5. Book 5: The Star Snatcher's Planet released December 28, 2012 or April 2013
6. Book 6: The Planet of the Night Globes released December 28, 2012 or April 2013
7. Book 7: The Planet of the Overhearers released December 28, 2012 or May 2013
8. Book 8: The Planet of the Tortoise Driver released December 28, 2012 or May 2013
9. Book 9: The Planet of the Giant released August or October 1, 2013
10. Book 10: The Planet of Trainiacs released August or October 1, 2013
11. Book 11: The Planet of Libris released September or October 1, 2013
12. Book 12: The Planet of Ludokaa released September or October 1, 2013
13. Book 13: The Planet of Tear-Eaters released March 1, 2014
14. Book 14: The Planet of the Grand Buffoon released March 1, 2014
15. Book 15: The Planet of the Gargand released March 1, 2014
16. Book 16: The Planet of Gehom released March 1, 2014
17. Book 17: The Planet of the Bubble Gob released October 1, 2014
18. Book 18: The Planet of Time released October 1, 2014
19. Book 19: The Planet of the Cublix released October 1, 2014
20. Book 20: The Planet of Coppelius released October 1, 2014
21. Book 21: The Planet of Okidians released January 1, 2015
22. Book 22: The Planet of Ashkabaar released January 1, 2015
23. Book 23: The Planet of Bamalias released August 1, 2015
24. Book 24: The Planet of the Snake released August 1, 2015

== 2D-animated spin-off ==
In February 2021, Method Animation and its parent company Mediawan through its division Mediawan Kids & Family announced a new spin-off animated series to the CGI animated series The Little Prince called The Little Prince & Friends with the titular character returning and this time joining two children named Charlotte and Elijah solving everyday problems in every planet. It was commissioned by France Télévisions, WDR and RAI the original broadcasters of the CGI series and first premiered in Italy on Rai Yoyo on August 11, 2023, before premiering in France on France 5 on September 1, 2023, and on Kika and WDR in Germany on December 1, 2024. Whilst this animated spin-off has CGI in Earth scenes like the original CGI animated series, the remainder of the above show is traditional animated as Luxemborgish production company Bidibul Productions joining the spin-off series.

== See also ==
- List of The Little Prince adaptations
- The Adventures of the Little Prince (TV series)
