= Barbie and the Three Musketeers =

- DVD cover
- Directed by: William Lau
- Written by: Amy Wolfram
- Based on: The Three Musketeers by Alexandre Dumas
- Produced by: Lori Forte
- Starring: Kelly Sheridan; Amelia Henderson; Kira Tozer; Willow Johnson; Dorla Bell; Tim Curry; Mark Hildreth
- Edited by: Sylvain Blais
- Music by: Eric Colvin
- Production companies: Mattel Entertainment; Rainmaker Entertainment
- Distributed by: Universal Studios Home Entertainment
- Release date: September 15, 2009
- Running time: 81 minutes
- Countries: Canada; United States
- Language: English

Barbie and the Three Musketeers is a 2009 CGI-animated fantasy film. It was released to DVD on September 15, 2009, and made its television debut on Nickelodeon on November 22, 2009.

This film is the sixteenth entry in the Barbie film series. It features the voice of Kelly Sheridan as Corinne d'Artagnan (played by Barbie) and is based on the 1844 novel The Three Musketeers by Alexandre Dumas.

== Plot ==
In 17th-century France, a seventeen-year-old girl named Corinne, who lives on a farm with her mother, dreams of becoming a Musketeer like her father, D'Artagnan. Her kitten Miette dreams of becoming a "mus-cat-eer".

Unfortunately, when they make it to Paris, things do not turn out as Corinne hoped. She is made fun of by other people, especially the Prince's cousin and advisor, Phillippe. His dog, Brutus, steals her letter to Monsieur Treville and flees to the castle. Corinne gets it back, but Brutus damages it. After having a conversation with Treville, he tells her she is not ready. However, the wicked Brutus chases Miette towards the castle, creating a worse situation with three palace maids. Corinne encounters Madame de Bosse, who hires her as another palace maid. After a hard day, one of the maids, Aramina, convinces the other two, Viveca and Renee, to let Corinne and Miette stay. They befriend each other and forgive her for what happened.

The next day at work, Corinne meets Prince Louis for the first time. After talking to Phillippe about his hot-air balloon invention, a chandelier drops and almost crushes Louis but he moves just in time. Corinne, Viveca, Aramina and Renee show off their musketeer skills to defend themselves from the chandelier fragments. Corinne finds a gem next to the chandelier rope, which appears to have been cut. Corinne tells her friends about her dream to become a musketeer and three girls excitedly reveal they also have the same dream.

The old maid, Helen, overhears their conversation and takes them through a secret passageway, where she leads them to the old forgotten musketeer's training room and agrees to train the four girls to be true musketeers.

One day, while Corinne is cleaning, she spots Louis hanging from his flying hot air balloon and saves his life. He thanks her and they immediately fall in love. While on the balloon, she sees the rope attached has been cut, just like the chandelier. When Louis confusedly says girls can't be musketeers, Corinne storms off and tells her friends what happened. Helen warns them to keep eyes and ears open for enemies, otherwise Prince Louis will be in grave danger. Miette sneaks into the castle, with the help of Corinne's horse Alexander, to join training with Corinne and her friends. Finally, their training is completed.

One night, Corinne, Viveca, Aramina, and Renee decide to celebrate their musketeer skills. While walking through the dark, deserted streets, they encounter men led by a man named Regent who pulls out a knife that Corinne realizes matches the gem she found next to the chandelier rope. They discover the Regent's men are sneaking weapons into the masquerade ball to kill Louis so his evil cousin Phillippe will be the new king.

They try to tell Treville, but no one believes them and they are banned from the castle. They wear disguises and sneak into the ball without being caught. The prince chooses to dance with Corinne; though he does not recognize her with her mask, he feels he knows her. The henchmen attack; they capture Treville and the other musketeers, fight the girls and throw Louis into the passageways where Phillipe chases him to the rooftops.

In the end, after escaping the men and freeing Treville and the musketeers, Corinne saves Louis just in time and they arrest Phillippe, Regent, Brutus, and their men. Corinne, Viveca, Aramina, and Renee remove their masks and Corinne and Louis reconcile. Louis names them royal musketeers on the day of his coronation. Helen takes Madame de Bosse's place and Madame de Bosse is made a maid as punishment for being so wicked and bossy. Corinne's mother is proud of her daughter finally becoming a musketeer. Louis offers to take Corinne on another balloon ride, but before she can say yes, Treville informs her and the other girls of a plot against the king. Corinne and her three best friends mount their horses, shout "All for one, and One for all!" and wave goodbye to Louis and the kingdom as they ride off happily towards the sunrise on their next adventure to save another day.

== Allusions to the original story ==
- Paris, which is France's capital city and the center location of the original story, is also the location for the film.
- The girls mention a former roommate named Constance. In the novel, Constance Bonacieux is the woman that D'Artagnan falls in love with.
- One of the guests at the masquerade ball is introduced as the Countess de Winter, who was one of the antagonists from the original story.
- Monsieur Treville, the captain of the Musketeers in the film, is named after the captain in the original story, Monsieur de Treville.
- The part when Corinne accidentally falls on each of the three girls and makes them angry alludes to the beginning of the novel where D'Artagnan accidentally runs into each of the Musketeers, unintentionally upsetting each man and earning himself a challenge to a duel.
- Corinne's home is in Gascony, which is the location of D'Artagnan's family estate in the novel. Corinne also mentioned to Treville her father, D'Artagnan, who had also been a musketeer.
- Tim Curry, who voices Philippe in the film, also played the villainous Cardinal Richelieu in the 1993 live-action version of The Three Musketeers. The name of the character is also a reference to the sequel to the Three Musketeers, The Iron Mask, which also features a cousin to the king named Philippe.
- Aramina appears to be named after Aramis, another protagonist from the novel. Aramis' first name was Rene, so Renee appears to have been named after him, too.

== Cast ==
- Kelly Sheridan as Corinne (played by Barbie), a 17-year-old country girl from Gascony. Hot-headed, confident, and determined, she aspires to become a musketeer, like her father, D'Artagnan. Her signature color is pink, and her chief weapon is a sword. She is Caucasian with fair skin, blonde hair and blue eyes.
- Willow Johnson as Aramina (played by Summer), an idealistic dancer. She has a crush on Prince Louis, but is delighted when he and Corinne fall in love. Her signature color is teal, and her weapon is a pair of fans. She is Caucasian with light skin, strawberry red hair and hazel eyes.
- Dorla Bell as Renée (played by Nikki), a practical, well-headed and skilled fighter and slightly unfriendly violinist. Her signature color is blue, and her weapons are a sling and bow. She is black with dark skin, dark brown/black hair and brown eyes.
- Kira Tozer as Viveca (played by Teresa), a stylish and witty fashionista. She tends to use French in her speech. Her signature color is purple, and her weapon is a pair of ribbons which she uses as whips. She has brunette hair in ringlets, tan skin and brown eyes.
- Tim Curry as Philippe, the main antagonist. He plots to kill his own cousin, the Prince, and to make himself king.
- Mark Hildreth as Prince Louis, a prince who will become the future king and Corrine's boyfriend. He loves the thought of flying and inventions. He falls in love with Corinne after she saves his life.
- Bernard Cuffling as Monsieur Treville, a good friend of Corinne's father. He is a brave and strong musketeer.
- Merrilyn Gann as Madame de Bossé, the bossy cruel boss of Helen, Corinne, Viveca, Aramina, and Renee when they are maids.
- Kathleen Barr as Hélène, a wise elderly maid who trains Corinne, Viveca, Aramina and Renee to become musketeers. She later becomes the boss of Madame de Bossé.
  - Barr also voices Fancy dress girl # 2
- Nicole Oliver as Corrine's mother
  - Oliver also voices Fancy dress girl #1
- Amelia Henderson as Miette, Corinne's kitten who dreams of becoming a mus"cat"teer.
- David Kaye as Alexander, Corinne's brave horse (previously her father's)
- Brian Dobson as Brutus, Philippe's wicked dog who Miette must defeat.

== Reviews ==
CommonSenseMedia's review gave the movie three stars out of five and concluded: "A pretty good try, but this Musketeer misses the mark...Barbie does all kinds of acrobatic moves, which flaunt her girlishness, but putting a sword in her dainty little hands seems to be a stretch."

DVDverdict's review said the CGI was not spectacular and adults would not find much to cheer about. However, children would find it "fine and dandy. It has no offensive material, and promotes the idea girls can be anything they want if given a chance and the right accessories."

DVD Talk's review rated the content worth two stars out of five (but three for video and audio), but advised "Rent it" due in part to the songs. "Unfortunately, some distasteful songs run throughout this speedy retelling of the Dumas classic, so be forewarned...Not only are the lyrics ugly, they're senseless."

== Release ==
The movie was released on DVD on September 15, 2009 and opened at #2, selling 399,000 units which translated to $5.6 million in sales. By early October, it had dropped to #24 in rank. A total of 629,178 DVD units had been sold, representing total sales of $9.9 million.

This was the first Barbie direct-to-video film to have its distribution fully handled by Universal Pictures International outside of North America instead of Entertainment Rights (to which Universal was previously the home video distributor for them for the Barbie movies), as part of their new deal with Mattel.

== Video game ==
Barbie and the Three Musketeers
- Developer: WayForward Technologies
- Publisher: Activision
- Director: Adam Tierney
- Producer: Robb Alvey
- Designers: Chris Schroeder; Aaron Davis
- Programmer: George Mathews
- Artist: Henk Nieborg
- Writer: Adam Tierney
- Composers: Jake Kaufman (DS, Wii, PC); Martin Schioeler (DS)
- Platforms: Wii; Nintendo DS; Microsoft Windows
- Release: Wii: NA: November 3, 2009; AU: November 5, 2009; NA: November 13, 2009; Nintendo DS: NA: November 3, 2009; AU: November 5, 2009; NA: November 13, 2009; Microsoft Windows: NA: October 27, 2009
- Genres: Action, platform
- Mode: Single-player

A video game based on the film was released for the Wii, Nintendo DS, and Microsoft Windows published by Activision and developed by WayForward Technologies. It is a 2D platformer where you control Corinne, and later Renée, Viveca and Aramina, each one with their own special abilities, across 15 levels that loosely follows the events from the movie, with some scenes from it being used as cutscenes between certain levels. Each level contains 100 coins that can be collected to be spent in a shop run by Viveca where the player can buy additional clothes for the characters to wear during the game, as well as screenshots taken from the movie that can be viewed in a gallery. All versions of the game are the same except for the Wii and Windows versions having smoother graphics and instrumental music. Game Director Adam Tierney wanted to make sure that the game's combat incorporated the dancer-like quality to the movement as seen in the animation. Mixing dancing and fencing with a Shaolin sword-fighting flair, they were able to achieve this, and the characters weren't just re-enacting canned slashes over and over. In addition, each of the 4 playable characters were given abilities as an homage to NES-era games. For example Corinne could hang from ceilings like Grant Danasty in Castlevania III: Dracula's Curse, while Viveca used long ribbons to swing in the air like Nathan 'Rad' Spencer in Bionic Commando. None of these ideas came from the film, but the freedom provided by the producers at Mattel and Activision made for a much more fun and interesting game.

== See also ==
- List of Barbie films
