= Camp Candy =

Animated television series

- Genre: Animated series
- Created by: Joel Andryc; Ellen Levy
- Developed by: John Candy; Jack Mendelsohn; Scott Shaw; Phil Harnage
- Directed by: Scott Shaw (season 1); Dan Thompson (season 2); Winston Richard (season 3); Animation director: Robert Alvarez (season 1)
- Starring: John Candy
- Voices of: Tony Ail; Lewis Arquette; Valri Bromfield; E. G. Daily; Tom Davidson; Danielle Fernandes; Brian George; Willow Johnson; George MacPherson; Danny Mann; Gail Matthius; Candi Milo; Andrew Seebaran; Cree Summer; Chiara Zanni
- Opening theme: "Camp Candy Theme" sung by Harry Nilsson and John Candy
- Composers: Shuki Levy (seasons 1, 3); Haim Saban (season 1); Clark Gassman (season 2)
- Countries of origin: United States; Canada
- Original language: English
- No. of seasons: 3
- No. of episodes: 40

Production
- Executive producers: Andy Heyward (seasons 1–2); Haim Saban (seasons 1, 3); John Candy (season 3); Robby London (season 2); David Campbell (season 3)
- Producers: Scott Shaw (seasons 1–2); Winston Richard (season 3)
- Running time: 23 minutes
- Production companies: DIC Animation City (seasons 1–2); Saban Entertainment (season 1.3)

Original release
- Network: NBC (1989–1991); Syndication (1992)
- Release: September 9, 1989 – 1992

Camp Candy is an animated television series created by Joel Andryc and Ellen Levy produced by DIC Animation City (for seasons 1-2) Saban Entertainment (for season 1 and 3) in association with Frostbacks Productions, with comedian John Candy providing the voice for an animated version of himself. It Aired on NBC From September 9, 1989 To January 19, 1991 With Thirteen new episodes ran in syndication in the 1992 season, distributed by Worldvision Enterprises, along with repeats of the previous episodes. The series was later rerun on the Fox Family cable channel from 1998 to 2001. Ownership of the series passed to Disney following Saban Entertainment's closure in 2001.

== Plot ==
The show is set in a fictional summer camp run by John Candy. Twenty-six episodes of the series aired during the 1989 and 1990 television seasons on the NBC television network. Almost all episodes would begin with John Candy trying to demonstrate an outdoor skill (or on occasion, coach a sport) to some kids, which would reminded him of a story, which he would tell in the episode's narration. Candy was a dedicated and responsible leader of Camp Candy, a summer camp that was presumably built by him years ago with the help of the townspeople, Harry, Botch, and Molly, and he frequently tries to get various kids to get along. A majority of the episodes focused on Candy himself, namely having to stave off the bankruptcy or destruction of the camp due to the plots of Rex DeForest III or within everyday struggles.

In the third season, Candy appeared in live action segments, talking about nature and ecology. Several characters originating from SCTV that were performed by Candy or otherwise also made guest appearances that season.

== Characters ==
- John Candy (voiced by himself) is the fictional version of the actor who is the proprietor of Camp Candy. John is a friendly and big-hearted yet clumsy everyman with a strong sense of humor, as he jokes around, makes puns, and loves to engage in witty banters with those who antagonize him in almost every episode. In nearly every episode, John encounters a problem that may cause Camp Candy to be shut down by either the schemes of Rex DeForest III or outside forces, but he always manages to somehow end the day coming out on top. John is noticeably large and portly as he loves food and has a large appetite, yet he is in good shape and is often thought of as being very attractive, even "handsome" by many female characters, mostly by Molly. He has shaggy dirty blonde hair and typically wears an army green shirt with pockets in the front over a white T-shirt, a whistle around his neck, army green shorts, and brown boots, but he has been seen in a variety of outfits.
- Nurse Molly March (voiced by Valri Bromfield) is the nurse at Camp Candy. Molly is highly qualified as she regularly goes out of her way to treat any medical problem no matter how serious or trivial. She, however, can come across as being naive and overeager and has a strong tendency to have her head in the clouds, as opposed to the more down-to-earth John, as well as possessing a number of unusual pastimes, such as sharing John's love of polka music, i.e. the Shmenge Brothers. Molly is well-known for having an obvious crush on John, frequently flirting with him while tends to his frequent injuries; John, aware of Molly's feelings for him, is shown to have feelings for her in return from time to time, as they become a couple near the end of the series. Molly has shoulder-length blonde hair and a rather prominent nose (which John affectionately refers to as "a nose that wouldn't quit", implying that he notices her beauty), and mostly wears bright red earrings, matching lipstick, and a white nurse's uniform she rarely takes off.
- Robin (voiced by Danielle Fernandes in season 1, Cree Summer in season 2, Candi Milo in season 3) is a nature lover who is known for her sweet, shy and sensitive personality. She is very good at understanding and communicating with animals and loves being out in the wilderness, taking in all the nature around her. She hates to see any environment in danger or any animal hurt and wants to help everyone anyway she can. She is an African-American with her black hair tied in twin buns and wears a t-shirt with the letter C, shorts, white socks and gray sneakers.
- Alexandra "Alex" (voiced by Chiara Zanni in season 1–2, E. G. Daily in season 3) is a tomboy who has a huge enjoyment of camping and sports. She is described as brash, outgoing and extremely courageous, never letting anything scare her. She also likes to take up the role as leader, but Alex's leader senses can make her way too bossy. Physical activity is her favorite hobby and always loves to participate in races, sports and always desires to have lots of exercise in her life. She has red hair that is tied in two pigtails and wears a t-shirt with the letter C on it, shorts and brown boots.
- Vanessa (voiced by Willow Johnson in season 1–2, Gail Matthius in season 3) is an extremely girly fashionista who comes from a rich family. She is new to camping as she had been used to a wealthy environment. As such, Vanessa can come across as being very self-centered and entitled, speaking in a rather haughty manner while still being supportive, helpful and charismatic. Fashion is her specialty and, like Molly, she takes pride in her appearance and never goes anywhere without her beauty essentials. She has long brown hair (in the comics her hair is auburn), with a portion of it held up in a whale spout ponytail and wears a t-shirt with the letter C on it, shorts, pink socks and lavender sneakers.
- Richard "Rick" (voiced by Andrew Seebaran in season 1–2, E. G. Daily in season 3) is a prankster who comes from a family line of comedy. Like John, Rick is notable for his easygoing attitude as well as his comedic nature. He loves to pull pranks on the campers and John just as much as he loves to act cool, but Rick can get to the point of irritating and can even be very reckless at times. He has blonde hair as well as green and pink shorts.
- Bartholomew "Binky" (voiced by Tony Ail in season 1–2, E. G. Daily in season 3) is the youngest of the campers and Iggy's younger brother. Binky is described as a daredevil and loves to seek out an adventure. He is very energetic, optimistic and very curious, always wanting to know more about the world without him, but being the youngest he can get very careless about his safety, as well as coming across as a bit naive, dragging the ever-reluctant Iggy along with him. He has short ash brown hair that is covered by a blue cap turning the other way.
- Iggy (voiced by Tom Davidson in season 1–2, Katie Leigh in season 3) is a timid, high-strung, clumsy, and accident-prone boy who fears practically everything and was the most hesitant about attending Camp Candy, that is, until John showed him what fun summer camp can be. Despite having such an reluctant attitude, Iggy is known for being the smartest camper due to his intense knowledge of the wild even moreso than John. He is Binky's older brother and has short ash brown hair with glasses.
- Botch (voiced by Brian George) is the camp chef who debuts in the second season. He was a Czechoslovak immigrant who spoke with an Eastern European accent. When not tending to his duties in the camp's kitchen, Botch was seen practicing his shots at basketball.
- Harry Gallagher (voiced by Maurice LaMarche) is Camp Candy's counselor-in-training who is tends to be a self-serving brown-noser which annoys him quite a bit, yet in typical John Candy fashion, he treats Harry very well and lets him in on all the fun and hilarity at Camp Candy.
- Rex DeForest III (voiced by Lewis Arquette) is the primary antagonist of the series. DeForest is an extremely self-centered and greedy businessman and entrepreneur who openly hates John as he had built his Camp Candy on his property per an agreement they had made years ago. His plans often involved getting Camp Candy shut down or constructing nearby it. These plans always fail for various reasons (or by John and the campers' interference) and Camp Candy would continue to stay open.
  - Chester (voiced by Danny Mann) is DeForest's henchman. He was a dimwitted greaser who always followed Rex's orders. One episode had him revert to his childhood after falling into a "fountain of youth", which Rex takes advantage of to use Chester as a kid to join Camp Candy in order to cause trouble, but he has a change of attitude and starts to think for himself once John and the Camp Candy kids accepted him.
- Robert "Bob" Nayles (voiced by Jess Harnell in season 3) is the head counselor of another summer camp called Camp Kickboot which is at the other side of the lake. Bob's personality is nearly the opposite of John's; he is self-centered, brash, snide, bossy, demanding, short-tempered, and very hot-headed. Nayles is like a drill sergeant and his camp is like a military school. He can, however, be cowardly when faced with real danger that he cannot handle, in which John uses his own skills to save him.

== Cast ==
- John Candy as Himself, Bear (in "When It Rains...It Snows"), Yosh Shmenge (in "Saturday Night Polka Fever"), Dr. Tongue (in "Dr. Tongue's Amazing Adventures")
- Lewis Arquette as Rex DeForest III
- Valri Bromfield as Nurse Molly March
- Danny Mann as Chester
- Andrew Seebaran as Rick (Seasons 1–2)
- Tom Davidson as Iggy (Seasons 1–2)
- Tony Ail as Binky (Seasons 1–2)
- Danielle Fernandes as Robin (Season 1)
- Chiara Zanni as Alex (Seasons 1–2)
- Willow Johnson as Vanessa (Seasons 1–2)
- Brian George as Botch (Season 2)
- Gary MacPherson as Harry Gallagher (Season 2)
- Cree Summer as Robin (Season 2)
- E. G. Daily as Rick, Binky, Alex (Season 3)
- Katie Leigh as Iggy (Season 3)
- Candi Milo as Robin (Season 3)
- Gail Matthius as Vanessa (Season 3)

=== Additional voices ===
- Charlie Adler (Season 1)
- Tim Andres (Season 1)
- Lynda Boyd (Season 1)
- Scott Bremner (Season 1)
- Don Brown (Seasons 1–2)
- Jim Byrnes (Seasons 1–2)
- William Callaway (Season 1)
- Christopher Candy (Seasons 2–3)
- Jennifer Candy (Seasons 2–3)
- Victoria Carroll (Season 3)
- Garry Chalk (Seasons 1–2)
- Brent Chapman (Season 1)
- Babs Chula (Season 2)
- George Coe (Season 3)
- Ted Cole (Seasons 1–2)
- Bob Costas as Himself (in "Candy Springs")
- Michael Donovan (Seasons 1–2)
- Pat Fraley (Season 1)
- Lorena Gale (Seasons 1–2)
- Marcy Goldberg (Season 2)
- Michael Greer (Season 3)
- Jess Harnell as Bob Nayles (in "When It Rains...It Snows"), Duck (in "When It Rains...It Snows"), Weatherman (in "When It Rains...It Snows")
- Doc Harris (Season 1)
- Phil Hayes (Season 2)
- Mark Hildreth (Seasons 1–2)
- Michael Horse as Chief Leapin' Lizard (in "When It Rains...It Snows")
- Tino Insana as Perry Gravy (in "Dr. Tongue's Amazing Adventures")
- Alessandro Juliani (Seasons 1–2)
- Terry Klassen (Season 1)
- Maurice LaMarche as Harry Gallagher
- David L. Lander (Season 3)
- Victoria Langston (Season 1)
- Eugene Levy as Pete (in "When it Rains...It Snows"), Stan Shmenge (in "Saturday Night Polka Fever"), Bruno (in "Dr. Tongue's Amazing Adventures"), Bobby Bittman (in "Bobby Bittman")
- Andrea Martin as Miss Woodenhouse (in "Lucky Dog")
- Roddy McDowall (Season 3)
- Shane Meier (Season 2)
- Jason Michas (Season 2)
- Jane Mortifee (Season 2)
- Richard Newman (Season 2)
- Bailee Ostry (Season 1)
- Doug Parker (Seasons 1–2)
- Alvin Sanders (Season 2)
- James Sherry (Season 1)
- Hal Smith (Season 3)
- Kath Soucie (Season 3)
- Dave Thomas as Mr. Schnope (in "Bobby Bittman")
- Marcia Wallace (Season 3)
- Frank Welker as Lucky (in "Lucky Dog")
- Cathy Weseluck (Season 1)
- Dale Wilson (Season 2)
- William Windom (Season 3)
- Tomm Wright (Season 1)

== Episodes ==
=== Series overview ===
Season	Episodes	Originally released	
Season	Episodes	First released	Last released
1	13	September 9, 1989	December 16, 1989
2	14	September 8, 1990	January 19, 1991
3	13	1992	1992

=== Season 1 (1989) ===
No. overall	No. in season	Title	Original release date
1	1	"The Forest's Prime Evil"	September 9, 1989
2	2	"Small Foot, Big Trouble"	September 16, 1989
3	3	"The Katchatoree Creature"	September 23, 1989
4	4	"Tough as Nayles"	September 30, 1989
5	5	"Bird is the Word/Best Behavior"	October 7, 1989
6	6	"Fools Gold"	October 14, 1989
7	7	"Sleight of Hand/Thanks, But No Pranks"	October 21, 1989
8	8	"Mind Over Matter/Brat Pact"	November 4, 1989
9	9	"May the Best Parents Win"	November 11, 1989
10	10	"Not So Brave Brave/Opposites Attract"	November 18, 1989
11	11	"Indian Love Call/Spoiled Sports"	December 2, 1989
12	12	"Rick Gets the Picture/Poor Little Rich Girl"	December 9, 1989
13	13	"Christmas in July"	December 16, 1989

=== Season 2 (1990–91) ===
No. overall	No. in season	Title	Original release date
14	1	"Robo-Camp/The Glasnost Menagerie"	September 8, 1990
15	2	"Color War and Peace"	September 15, 1990
16	3	"Camp Cuisine/Take the Compass and Run"	September 22, 1990
17	4	"Candy Springs"	September 29, 1990
18	5	"Wish Upon a Fish"	October 6, 1990
19	6	"Taking the Bully by the Horns/Rock Candy"	October 13, 1990
20	7	"Dear Mom and Dad"	October 20, 1990
21	8	"Stand Up and Deliver/Ruthless Campers"	October 27, 1990
"Stand Up and Deliver": Rex DeForest III has developed a new summer resort that is ruining Camp Candy. To set up their own telethon to save Camp Candy from being made into a highway, they persuade the comedian Sonny Yuckmeister to help promote Camp Candy. "Ruthless Campers": Rex DeForest III is babysitting his sister's mischievous twin sons Jason and Freddy who are causing trouble for him and Chester. To get them out of his hair, Rex has Jason and Freddy sent to Camp Candy. Binky works on befriending these boys who are the same age as him as Jason and Freddy cause trouble throughout Camp Candy.
22	9	"Camp Candy's Funniest Home Videos"	November 3, 1990
Note: This episode is a clip show.
23	10	"Robin's Ark"	November 10, 1990
24	11	"Candy and the Ants/Smart Moose, Foolish Choices"	November 17, 1990
25	12	"One Million Years B.C."	November 24, 1990
Rex DeForest III plans to put a super highway through the mountains on his part of the property line much to the protests of everyone at Camp Candy. When a rainstorm happens, they take refuge in a cave that Binky found where they find cave paintings revolving around the Condi Tribe and their clash with the caveman ancestors of Rex DeForest III and Chester.
26	13	"Jokers of the Wild/Uncle Rexie"	December 1, 1990
27	14	"Scare Package"	January 19, 1991

=== Season 3 (1992) ===
No. overall	No. in season	Title	Original release date
28	1	"TV or Not TV"	TBA
29	2	"Rock and Rest/Rick Van Winkle"	TBA
30	3	"The Last Word"	TBA
31	4	"A Ribbeting Experience/The Bamboo Woodpecker"	TBA
32	5	"Wild, Wild Candy"	TBA
33	6	"When It Rains... It Snows"	TBA
A heat wave has it Camp Candy which has even affected the local animals. Rex DeForest III and Chester obtain instant rain crystals in Rex's latest attempt to get John Candy to sell Camp Candy's properties. When the cloud seeding is done, it starts snowing instead. The campers start to adjust to the snow as John calls in his friend Pete to teach them how to play ice hockey. They are challenged to a match by Al Nayles and Camp Kickboot as Rex and Chester plan to sabotage it with Insta-Freeze spray causing John to enlist the help of Chief Leapin' Lizard and the Cowabunga Indians to combat the unnatural weather systems.
34	7	"Saturday Night Polka Fever"	TBA
35	8	"Chester's Millions"	TBA
36	9	"Bee Prepared/Signs of Silence"	TBA
37	10	"Dr. Tongue's Amazing Adventures/Lucky Dog"	TBA
"Dr. Tongue's Amazing Adventures": John and his campers stay up late and watch "Nightmare Theater" which is showing the movie "Dr. Tongue's 3D Museum of Wax Statue". They are suddenly visited by Dr. Tongue the actor and Bruno who need to use their telephone to do a business call when their car broke down. While John has the mechanic Perry Gravy fix Dr. Tongue's car, Dr. Tongue does a 3D campfire story about how they had a crash where the boa constrictor they rented from the snake farm had escaped. "Lucky Dog": The campers complain to John about how John's dog Lucky has been acting boring to them, eating, sleeping, and having gross flea. The campers work to make Lucky look presentable like giving him a makeover and having Nurse Molly do a thorough examination on him. At Nurse Molly's suggestion, John takes Lucky to Miss Woodenhouse's Advanced Institute for Canine Control. When that fails, John takes Lucky for a walk in the woods until John ends up trapped in a rockslide and it is up to Lucky to save him.
38	11	"Wild World of Camping/Total Lack of Recall"	TBA
39	12	"Battle of the Badges/The Return of the Magnificent Three"	TBA
40	13	"Bobby Bittman"	TBA

== Production ==
=== Songs ===
Harry Nilsson wrote the series' theme song, which he sang with Candy. In both versions, the closing credits featured songs about Camp Candy that were sung to the tune of various folk songs such as "Bingo" (spoofed as "Candy"), "I've Been Working on the Railroad" (parodied as "I've Been Camping at Camp Candy"), "Comin' Around the Mountain", "Over the River and Through The Woods" (parodied as "Over the Field and Through the Woods"), "Yankee Doodle Boy" (parodied as "Big John Candy"), "The Bear Went Over the Mountain" (parodied as "A Jolly Good Camp"), "Tiny Tim, the Turtle" (parodied as "We Have a Camp Called Candy"), "Row Row Row Your Boat" (parodied as "Camp Candy Is a Scream"), "Reuben and Rachel" (parodied as "Robin and Iggy"), "On Top of Old Smokey" (parodied as "On Top of Mount Frostback") and "The Daring Young Man on the Flying Trapeze" (parodied as "Circus Parade").

== Comics ==
The animated series spawned a brief comic book series based on the show; also entitled Camp Candy, it was published by Marvel Comics' Star Comics imprint.
