= Willow Johnson =

Canadian voice actress

- Occupation: Voice actress
- Years active: 1988–present
- Spouse: Ken LaTour
- Children: 1

Willow Johnson is a Canadian voice actress who has worked in Vancouver, voicing characters in English language versions of anime and cartoons. She is best known for voicing Aramina in the film Barbie and the Three Musketeers, Lalah Sune in the Mobile Suit Gundam series, Kikyo in the Inuyasha series, and Starlight in the My Little Pony Tales series. Her first role in animation was when she was 12 years old in a Canadian show called Camp Candy. She is married to musician Ken LaTour and has one child.

== Filmography ==
=== Animation ===
List of voice performances in animation
Year	Title	Role	Notes	Source
1989–1992	Camp Candy	Vanessa		
2003	Ben Hur	Tirzah, Mary		
2009	Barbie and the Three Musketeers	Aramina		
2009	Sing Along with Barbie	Additional Voices		

=== Anime ===
List of voice performances in anime
Year	Title	Role	Notes	Source
1994	Ranma ½	Kasumi Tendo		
1995	Fatal Fury: Legend of the Hungry Wolf	Lily McGuire		
1995	Fatal Fury 2: The New Battle	Lily McGuire		
1995	Fatal Fury: The Motion Picture	Lily McGuire		
2001	Dragon Ball Z	Android 18	Episodes 194–275 (Ocean dub)	
2001	Mobile Suit Gundam	Lalah Sune		
2001	Cardcaptor Sakura	Ruby Moon	Known as Cardcaptors in North America	
2002	Escaflowne	Yukari		
2002	Inuyasha	Kikyo (recurring role)		
2002–04	Project ARMS	Yugo Gilbert		
2003–04	Megaman NT Warrior	Tamako		
2004	Inuyasha the Movie: Affections Touching Across Time	Kikyo		
2004	Inuyasha the Movie: The Castle Beyond the Looking Glass	Kikyo		
2006	Inuyasha the Movie: Fire on the Mystic Island	Kikyo		
2007	Ayakashi: Samurai Horror Tales	Tomihime		
2012	Inuyasha: The Final Act	Kikyo		(supporting role)
2020–22	Yashahime: Princess Half-Demon	Spirit of the Sacred Tree of Ages (supporting role)		

=== Video games ===
List of voice performances in video games
Year	Title	Role	Notes	Source
2003	Mobile Suit Gundam: Encounters in Space	Lalah Sune		
2004	Inuyasha: The Secret of the Cursed Mask	Kikyo		
2005	Inuyasha: Feudal Combat	Kikyo		
2007	Dynasty Warriors: Gundam	Lalah Sune		
2009	Dynasty Warriors: Gundam 2	Lalah Sune		
