= List of The Little Prince episodes =

The Little Prince (French: Le Petit Prince) is a Swiss-French animated children's television series inspired by Antoine de Saint-Exupéry's novel The Little Prince that began broadcast in late 2010 on France 3. The series was created by Method Animation and the Saint-Exupéry-d'Agay Estate Production, in co-production with LPPTV, Sony Pictures Home Entertainment, Fabrique d'Images, DQ Entertainment and ARD, in participation with France Télévisions, WDR, Rai Fiction, Télévision Suisse Romande and TV5Monde.

The series aired in over 150 markets around the world. It was distributed as 36 mini-movies, each encompassing an individual story line, as well as 78 half hour episodes, where those story arcs are split into multiple parts. An English version, created by Ocean Productions, began airing in Canada on TVOntario on November 6, 2011. It also began airing on Knowledge Network on January 8, 2012. In Australia, it began airing on ABC3 on August 19, 2012. In the United States, the series launched alongside Primo TV on January 16, 2017.

The whole list is organized according to the show's French broadcast.

== Series overview ==
Season	Episodes	Originally released	
Season	Episodes	First released	Last released
1	23	December 24, 2010	December 24, 2011
2	29	February 20, 2012	May 1, 2013
3	26	December 24, 2014	December 20, 2015

== Episodes ==
=== Season 1 (2010-11) ===
No.	Title	Planet	Airdate (France)	Airdate (Canada)	Prod. code
1	"The Planet of Time" "La Planète du Temps"	Planet B 546	December 24, 2010	January 1st, 2012	101
When the Little Prince sets foot on planet B546, it is all out of synch. In one village, time has stopped. In another, on the contrary, it has sped up. Following the advice of the evil snake, the watchmaker turns all the clocks back, but going back in time can be dangerous. Later aired as two episodes.
2	"The Planet of the Firebird" "La Planète de l'Oiseau de Feu"	Planet B 311	February 25, 2011	November 6th, 2011	102
The little prince helps the twin princes return the crown to the firebird to restore abundance to the planet. Later aired as two episodes.
3	"The Planet of Wind" "La Planète des Éoliens"	Planet B 222	April 24, 2011	November 6th, 2011	103
The Little Prince tries to aid the Eolians with the wind, which has been failing because of a conflict between the Great Mage of the Winds and his son, Zephyr. Later aired as two episodes.
4	"The Planet of Music" "La Planète de la Musique"	Planet B678	June 13, 2011	February 5th, 2012	104
When the Little Prince arrives on planet B678, the Doites are a little unhinged by the strange behavior of Euphony, the singer whose songs rhythm everyday life. Lately, however, Euphony has been singing, less and out of tune and seems preoccupied. Later aired as two episodes.
5	"The Star Snatcher's Planet" "La Planète de l’Astronome"	Planet D 455	August 7, 2011	March 4th, 2012	105
The Chlorophilians' crops are failing because the astronomer keeps removing stars and planets. Later aired as two episodes.
6	"The Planet of Jade" "La Planète de Jade"	Planet B 356	September 6, 2011	March 4th, 2012	106
The brambles attack the village of the Letiens and they must escape, but unless Nika returns, they will not be able to leave the village. Later aired as two episodes.
7	"The Planet of the Globies" "La Planète des Globus"	Planet B 370	October 19, 2011	May 6th, 2012	107
The Little Prince discovers that the Globies are not the bad guys. Later aired as two episodes.
8	"The Planet of Amicopes" "La Planète des Amicopes"	Planet D 333	November 1, 2011	April 1st, 2012	108
Zara manipulates the voice messaging system, replacing it with band-aid launchers, causing absolute silence on the planet. Later aired as two episodes.
9	"Gehom's Planet" "La Planète de Géhom"	Planet D 444	November 23, 2011	April 1st, 2012	109
Later aired as two episodes.
10	"The Planet of Trainiacs" "La Planètes des Wagonautes"	Planet W 5613	December 17, 2011	June 3rd, 2012	110
Later aired as two episodes.
11	"The Planet of Bubble Gob" "La Planète du Bubble Gob"	Planet J 603	December 24, 2011	July 1st, 2012	111
The Bubble Gob, a creature created to clean the ocean, threatens the homes of the Creatall. Later aired as three episodes.

=== Season 2 (2012-13) ===
No.	Title	Planet	Airdate (France)	Airdate (Canada)	Prod. code
12	"The Planet of Carapodes" "Planète des Carapodes"	Planet B 723	February 20, 2012; February 21, 2012	May 6th, 2012	112
Originally aired as two episodes in France.
13	"The Planet of the Giant" "La Planète du Géant"	Planet B 782	February 23, 2012; February 24, 2012	August 5th, 2012	113
Originally aired as two episodes in France.
14	"The Planet of Ludokaa" "La Planète du Ludokaa"	Planet B 743	February 25, 2012; February 26, 2012	August 5th, 2012	114
Originally aired as two episodes in France.
15	"The Planet of the Lacrimavoras" "La Planète des Lacrimavoras"	Planet H 108	March 1, 2012; March 2, 2012	November 4th, 2012	115
Originally aired as two episodes in France.
16	"The Plant of Coppelius" "La Planète de Coppelius"	Planet C 669	April 16, 2012; April 17, 2012	November 4th, 2012	116
Originally aired as two episodes in France.
17	"The Planet of Okidiens" "La Planète des Okidiens"	Planet C 0101	April 19, 2012; April 20, 2012	January 6th, 2013	117
Originally aired as two episodes in France.
18	"The Planet of Libris" "La Planète des Libris"	Planet A 42692	April 23, 2012; April 24, 2012	June 3rd, 2012	118
Originally aired as two episodes in France.
19	"The Planet of Cublix" "La Planète des Cublix"	Planet C333	April 26, 2012; April 27, 2012	October 7th, 2012	119
Originally aired as two episodes in France.
20	"The Planet of Ashkabaar" "La Planète d’Ashkabaar"	Planet D555	May 8, 2012	January 6th, 2013	120
Later aired as two episodes.
21	"The Planet of the Bamalias" "La Planète des Bamalias"	Planet Z222	November 1, 2012	December 2nd, 2012	121
Later aired as three episodes.
22	"The Planet of the Gargand" "La Planète du Gargand"	Planet X442	March 6, 2013	September 2nd, 2012	122
Later aired as three episodes.
23	"The Planet of the Grand Buffoon" "La Planète du Grand Bouffon"	Planet B901	TBA	October 7th, 2012	123
Later aired as two episodes.
24	"The Planet of the Snake" "La Planète du Serpent"	Planet X000	May 1, 2013	February 3rd, 2013	124
Later aired as three episodes.

=== Season 3 (2014-15) ===
No.	Title	Planet	Airdate (France)	Airdate (Canada)	Prod. code
25	"The New Mission" "La Nouvelle Mission"	Planets B 325, B 330, B 505	December 24, 2014	March 15th, 2015; March 21st, 2015; March 29th, 2015	201
Later aired as three episodes.
26	"The Planet of the Grelon" "La Planète du Grelon"	Planets C 669 and B 901	December 25, 2014	April 5th, 2015; April 12th, 2015	202
Later aired as two episodes.
27	"The Planet of the Oracle" "La Planète de l'Oracle"	Planets D 333 and C 669	April 6, 2015	April 19th, 2015; April 26th, 2015	203
Later aired as two episodes.
28	"The Planet of the Crystal Tears" "La Planète des Larmes de Cristal"	Planets D 0101 and B 743	May 8, 2015	May 3rd, 2015; May 10th, 2015	204
Later aired as two episodes.
29	"The Planet of the Nymphalidae" "La Planète des Nymphalides"	Planets X 000 and B 222	TBA	August 21st, 2016 (Note: This episode first aired on Knowledge Network on November 1, 2015.); August 28th, 2016	205
Later aired as two episodes.
30	"The Planet of the Ice Bird" "La Planète de l'Oiseau de Glace"	Planets B 311 and D 555	TBA	September 4th, 2016 (Note: This episode first aired on Knowledge Network on November 8, 2015.)	206
Later aired as two episodes.
31	"The Planet of the Astrotrainiacs" "La Planète des Astrowagonautes"	Planets D 455 and W 5613	TBA	September 11th, 2016 (Note: This episode first aired on Knowledge Network on November 15, 2015.); September 18th, 2016	207
Later aired as two episodes.
32	"The Planet of the Giant Comet" "La Planète de la Comète Géante"	Planets D 0101 and B 782	August 7, 2015	September 25th, 2016 (Note: This episode first aired on Knowledge Network on November 22, 2015.); October 2nd, 2016	208
Later aired as two episodes.
33	"The Planet of the Garglux" "La Planète du Garglux"	Planets C 333 and X 422	TBA	October 9th, 2016 (Note: This episode first aired on Knowledge Network on November 29, 2015.); October 16th, 2016	209
Later aired as two episodes.
34	"The Planet of the Spadosaur" "La Planète du Creusivor"	Planets J 603 and B 723	TBA	October 23rd, 2016 (Note: This episode first aired on Knowledge Network on December 6, 2015.); October 30th, 2016	210
Later aired as two episodes.
35	"The Planet of the Cloud Tree" "La Planète de l'arbre à nuage"	Planets Z 222 and B 356	TBA	November 6th, 2016 (Note: This episode first aired on Knowledge Network on December 13, 2015.); November 13th, 2016	211
Later aired as two episodes.
36	"The Planet of the Rose" "La Planète de la Rose"	Planet A 000	TBA	November 20th, 2016 (Note: This episode first aired on Knowledge Network on December 20, 2015.); November 27th, 2016; December 4th, 2016	212
Later aired as three episodes.

== Home media ==
In France, Sony Pictures Home Entertainment released the first two seasons of the series on DVD between November 2010 and November 2013. Sony also released the first two mini-movies on DVD in French Canada. It was followed by a release of the third season by Unidisc.

In the United States, NCircle Entertainment released 18 episodes (in the mini-movie format) of the series across six DVDs between 2016 and 2018.

Region 1
DVD title	Season(s)	Aspect ratio	Episode count	Publisher	Release date(s)
La Planete Du Temps / La Planète de l'Oiseau de Feu	1	16:9	4	Sony Pictures Home Entertainment	November 6, 2012
Saison 3 - Volume 1	3	16:9	7	Unidisc	October 27, 2015
The Planet of Bubble Gob	1	16:9	3	NCircle Entertainment	January 12, 2016
Saison 3 - Volume 2	3	16:9	6	Unidisc	January 26, 2016
The Planet of Bamalias	2	16:9	3	NCircle Entertainment	April 5, 2016
Saison 3 - Volume 3	3	16:9	6	Unidisc	August 23, 2016
The Planet of Gargand	2	16:9	3	NCircle Entertainment	October 18, 2016
The Planet of the Snake	2	16:9	3	NCircle Entertainment	January 10, 2017
Saison 3 - Volume 4	3	16:9	7	Unidisc	January 24, 2017
The New Mission	3	16:9	3	NCircle Entertainment	August 8, 2017
The Planet Of The Rose	3	16:9	3	NCircle Entertainment	June 5, 2018
