= Kira Tozer =

Canadian voice actress (born 1984)

- Born: December 6, 1984 (age 41); Victoria, British Columbia, Canada
- Occupation: Voice actress
- Years active: 2009–present

Kira Tozer (born December 6, 1984) is a Canadian voice actress for cartoons, anime and video games. Her major roles include Minka Mark on Littlest Pet Shop and Kagome Higurashi in the 2012 anime, Inuyasha: The Final Act. She married in 2013.

== Filmography ==
=== Animation ===
List of voice and English dubbing performances in animation
Year	Series	Role	Notes	Source
2009	Barbie and the Three Musketeers	Viveca		
2009	Dinosaur Train	Ella Brachiosaurus	2 episodes	
2009	Sing Along with Barbie			
2009–2011	Hot Wheels: Battle Force 5	Sage, Grace		
2010	Guardians of the Power Masks	Annie		
2010–2015	The Little Prince	Princess Feng	English dub	
2012	Barbie in A Mermaid Tale 2	Ambassador Kattrin		
2012	Maya the Bee	Miss Cassandra, Barry, Max		
2012–2016	Littlest Pet Shop	Minka Mark, Sue Patterson, Aunt Christie, Ginny Hues, Minka Mark (Young), Mathelete 2, Olive Shellstein, Tanya Twitchel, Monkey the Monkey, Monkey Fairies, Honey Bee Who Looks Like Minka, Bat Camper, Biskit Mansion Computer, Blog Caller 1, Zapper Woman, Green Songbird		
2015	Barbie in Princess Power	Mikalya		
2015	Barbie in Rock 'N Royals	Princess Olivia, Stevie		
2015	K3	Kylie, additional voices		
2016	Mack & Moxy	Munch Munch, Penny		
2016	Beat Bugs	Gina		
2016	Nina's World	Suzy		
2017	My Little Pony: Equestria Girls - Movie Magic	Chestnut Magnifico, Canter Zoom's Personal Assistant		
2017	Chuck's Choice	Misha		
2018	Polly Pocket	Dr. Merriweather		
2019	My Little Pony: Friendship Is Magic	Fire Flare	Episode: "The Summer Sun Setback"	

=== Anime ===
List of English dubbing performances in animation
Year	Series	Role	Notes	Source
2012–13	Inuyasha: The Final Act	Kagome Higurashi	English dub	
2020–22	Yashahime: Princess Half-Demon	Kagome Higurashi	English dub	
