= List of Inuyasha characters =

Main characters from the series; from left to right: Kirara, Sango, Miroku, Kagome Higurashi, Inuyasha, and Shippō

The characters of the manga series Inuyasha were created by Rumiko Takahashi. Most of the series takes place in a fictional version of Japan's Warring States period with occasional time-travel/flashback elements to modern Tokyo or the Heisei period. The setting and plot incorporate many elements of traditional Japanese folklore and religion. Its main characters (both protagonists and antagonists) include a Shintō priestess, a Buddhist monk and several types of yōkai, usually rendered as "demon" in English-language translations of the series. The anime adaptation of Inuyasha is followed by a sequel titled Yashahime, whose characters are included in the list.

== Inuyasha main characters ==
=== Inuyasha ===
Voiced by: Kappei Yamaguchi (Japanese); Richard Ian Cox (Viz Media dub), Darren Pleavin (Animax Asia dub) (English)

Inuyasha (犬夜叉) was born of a dog-demon father and a human mother. He is an arrogant, prideful, and stubborn half-demon, but he has a soft side to him. He also has an older half-brother, Sesshomaru, who is a full-demon with a full-demon mother. He has the appearance of a fifteen-year-old boy. As a half-demon, he had a difficult and lonely childhood, as demons and humans despised him for his mixed bloodline.

=== Kagome Higurashi ===
Voiced by: Satsuki Yukino (Japanese); Moneca Stori (Inuyasha; Viz Media dub), Kira Tozer (Inuyasha: The Final Act and Yashahime; Viz Media dub), Andrea Kwan (Animax Asia dub) (English)

Kagome Higurashi (日暮 かごめ, Higurashi Kagome) is a brave and kind girl, the reincarnation of the Sengoku period priestess Kikyo, who believes in never turning her back on someone in trouble. Although physically weak, she is not lacking in courage. She becomes highly skilled in archery as the series progresses, and eventually masters her immensely strong spiritual powers. Of all the characters in the series, she has the greatest emotional strength, never allowing anger or jealousy to lead her to commit evil acts. By the start of Yashahime, she is spiritually as strong as Kikyo, and possibly stronger, given that she developed her own powers of arrow disappearance. Despite her inexperience, Naraku greatly fears Kagome's purifying powers, causing him to target her even more often than Inuyasha.

=== Miroku ===
Voiced by: Kōji Tsujitani (Inuyasha and InuYasha: The Final Act), Makoto Yasumura (Yashahime: Princess Half-Demon) (Japanese); Kirby Morrow (Inuyasha, Inuyasha: The Final Act, and Yashahime (first voice); Viz Media dub), Ian James Corlett (Yashahime (second voice); Viz Media dub), Dave Bridges (Animax Asia dub) (English)

Miroku (弥勒) is an eighteen-year-old lecherous and intelligent Buddhist monk who travels the countryside performing spiritual services, such as exorcisms and demon exterminations. However, he has a habit of either ripping off or outright robbing wealthy clients. Miroku can attack enemies with his khakkhara and sutra scrolls. But Miroku's greatest weapon is the Wind Tunnel (風穴, Kazaana; Wind Hole), a black hole embedded in his right palm, which is actually a hereditary curse originally inflicted upon his paternal grandfather by Naraku. Due to the curse's nature to eventually kill him, Miroku sought to find himself a wife to sire children before eventually falling in love with Sango. In the sequel series, after starting a family with Sango after his curse was lifted, Miroku left his family to train himself to fight demons without his Wind Tunnel.

=== Sango ===
Voiced by: Houko Kuwashima (Japanese); Kelly Sheridan (Viz Media dub), Candice Moore (Animax Asia dub) (English)

Sango (珊瑚) is a sixteen-year-old demon slayer (妖怪退治屋), the most skilled practitioner from her village, the original home of the Shikon Jewel. She wears traditional traveling attire or a black combat jumpsuit with pink demon-bone armor when fighting. Her primary weapon is the Hiraikotsu (飛来骨), a massive purified bone boomerang thrown with enhanced strength.

=== Shippo ===
Voiced by: Kumiko Watanabe (Japanese); Jillian Michaels (Viz Media dub), Candice Moore (Animax Asia dub) (English)

Shippo (七宝, Shippō) is an orphaned kitsune who initially tries stealing the Shikon Jewel from Inuyasha and Kagome to avenge his father's death. After they help him, he joins their group as a loyal companion. He often chastises Inuyasha for mistreating Kagome and suffers comedic retaliation for his pranks and blunt remarks. Despite this dynamic, he considers the group his surrogate family.

=== Kirara ===
Voiced by: Tarako

Kirara (雲母) is Sango's faithful companion who usually appears to be a small kitten-sized feline with two tails, but can become large enough to carry several passengers across the air whenever the need arises. She is a spiritual entity and traveled with Midoriko in the past. In the sequel series, Kirara becomes Hisui's companion while occasionally aiding Setsuna.

== Yashahime main characters ==
=== Towa Higurashi ===
Voiced by: Sara Matsumoto (Japanese); Erica Mendez (English)

Towa Higurashi (日暮 とわ, Higurashi Towa) is a half-demon, the eldest daughter of Sesshomaru and Rin, and Setsuna's twin sister. Physically, she inherited more of his father's features, including his white hair, distinguished by a distinct red streak in the front. Transported to the modern era at age four by the Sacred Tree of Ages, she is raised by Sōta Higurashi before reuniting with Setsuna ten years later. In battle, she fights with a combination of sword techniques and inherited demonic powers, channeling energy through her weapon and the Silver Rainbow Pearl embedded in her left eye. Her combat style evolves throughout her journey as she learns to harness and control her growing abilities.

=== Setsuna ===
Voiced by: Mikako Komatsu (Japanese); Kira Buckland (English)

Setsuna (せつな) is Towa's twin sister and Sesshomaru and Rin's youngest daughter, bearing the Gold Rainbow Pearl in her right eye. Separated during childhood and raised by successive guardians, she trains as a demon slayer under Kohaku. Her memories, erased by the Dream Butterfly, gradually return after reuniting with Towa. The Butterfly's influence prevents sleep while suppressing her half-demon weaknesses, though uncontrolled demonic blood triggers berserk states. She fights primarily with a naginata, first wielding Kanemitsu no Tomoe (兼光の巴) before obtaining the fate-severing Yukari no Tachikiri (所縁の断ち切り). After regaining normal sleep patterns, she develops new combat abilities and romantic feelings for Hisui.

=== Moroha ===
Voiced by: Azusa Tadokoro (Japanese); Morgan Berry (English)

Moroha (もろは), the quarter-demon daughter of Inuyasha and Kagome, is raised as a bounty hunter after being separated from her parents in infancy. Known professionally as "Moroha the Demon Killer" (化け殺しのもろは), she employs hybrid combat skills combining her father's demonic attacks and her mother's spiritual archery. Her signature weapons include the demonic sword Kurikaramaru (倶利伽羅丸) and a transformative rouge compact that temporarily unlocks her full demonic potential as Beniyasha (朱夜叉). After reuniting with her parents, she upgrades her arsenal with a Black Pearl-enhanced compact and a spiritually-charged longbow, eventually settling her debts with an acquired ice sword.

== Recurring Inuyasha characters ==
=== Inuyasha supporting characters ===
==== Kikyo ====
Voiced by: Noriko Hidaka (Japanese); Willow Johnson (Viz Media dub), Andrea Kwan (Animax Asia dub) (English)

Kikyo (桔梗, Kikyō) is a powerful priestess tasked with guarding the Shikon Jewel 500 years before the main events. She falls in love with Inuyasha and plans to use the Jewel to make him human, but Naraku manipulates them by impersonating both of them, resulting in her death. The witch Urasue (裏陶) later resurrects her using stolen grave remains.

In the spinoff, the Sacred Tree of Ages adopts Kikyo's form to communicate. Kohaku recounts to Towa how Kikyo's unwavering strength during their travels inspired him, particularly when she defeated and sealed the plant-demon Root Head (根の首) just before meeting Inuyasha.

==== Sesshomaru ====
Voiced by: Ken Narita (Japanese); David Kaye (Inuyasha and Yashahime; Viz Media dub), Michael Daingerfield (Inuyasha: The Final Act; Viz Media dub), Russell Wait (Animax Asia dub) (English)

Sesshomaru (殺生丸, Sesshōmaru) is a powerful dog demon (daiyōkai), feared throughout the feudal era. Born of a great demon bloodline, he is the older, more powerful half-brother of Inuyasha. He is usually accompanied by his demon minions, Jaken and A-Un. Chronologically, he is over 200 years old, while according to the official Inuyasha Profiles guide by Rumiko Takahashi, his appearance is equivalent to that of a 19-year-old human.

He once started as a major antagonist of Inuyasha and his friends, seeking power and strength, and showed disdain towards humans and half-demons. However, he eventually goes through a series of trials that lead to his redemption and eventually becoming an anti-hero.

==== Jaken ====
Voiced by: Chō (Japanese); Don Brown (Inuyasha and Inuyasha: The Final Act; Viz Media dub), Andrew Russell (Yashahime: Princess Half-Demon; Viz Media dub); Dave Bridges (Animax Asia dub) (English)

Jaken (邪見) is a small green imp-like demon loyal to Sesshomaru, often praising his master's greatness, although Sesshomaru usually ignores and sometimes abuses him. Jaken himself is not especially powerful, but he wields the Staff of Two Heads (人頭杖(にんとうじょう), Nintōjō; lit. 'Human Head Cane'), a fire-throwing staff that Sesshomaru gives him. The manga explains little about Jaken's past, but the anime shows that Jaken was once a lord among similar demons. After the older Rin gives birth to Sesshomaru's twin half-demon daughters, Jaken is tasked with protecting them after Sesshomaru hides them in the forest of the Sacred Tree of Ages.

==== Rin ====
Voiced by: Mamiko Noto (Japanese); Brenna O'Brien (Viz Media dub) (English)

Rin (りん, Rin) is a barefoot orphan girl who tended to Sesshomaru's injuries when she found him under a tree, having lost her family to bandits prior. Rin ended up being killed by wolves under Koga's tribe when they raided her village, and then resurrected by Sesshomaru using Tensaiga on her. She has since accompanied Sesshomaru throughout the events of the series, with her presence being a major part in Sesshomaru's redemption.

Many years later, as an adult, she marries Sesshomaru and later gives birth to their twin daughters, Towa and Setsuna. However, Rin was targeted by Zero as she placed the Silver Scale Curse (銀鱗の呪い, Ginrin no Noroi) on Rin's neck, with Sesshomaru placing her within the Tree of Ages until Zero's curse on her was broken.

==== A-Un ====
A-Un (阿吽, Aun) is a two-headed dragon demon with some horse-like features and Sesshomaru's beast of burden who is one of the two yōkai in the series explicitly stated to be a herbivore, like Totosai's ox. Despite traveling with Sesshomaru for centuries, he has no name until Rin gives him one, calling the right head "A" and the left head "Un". (Note: The kanji symbols 阿吽 together translate as "Alpha and Omega") A-Un can fire yōkai energy from both mouths. The right head shoots blue beams of lightning, while the left shoots green lightning that can control clouds and possibly the weather, and can fly like Sesshomaru. A grey cloud-like gas trails from his legs in flight, similar to Kirara's flames.

==== Kohaku ====
Voiced by: Akiko Yajima (Inuyasha and Inuyasha: The Final Act), Ryōhei Kimura (adult, Yashahime: Princess Half-Demon) (Japanese); Alex Doduk (Inuyasha (first voice); Viz Media dub), Danny McKinnon (Inuyasha (second voice); Viz Media dub), Aidan Drummond (Inuyasha: The Final Act; Viz Media dub), Alan Lee (Yashahime; Viz Media dub), Dave Bridges (Animax Asia dub) (English)

Kohaku (琥珀, Kohaku) is Sango's eleven-year-old brother who, like his family, is also a demon exterminator. He grew into a confident leader of a new generation of demon-slayers, which included his teenage nephew, Hisui, and Sesshomaru's younger twin half-demon daughter, Setsuna. He uses the larger chain-sickle he had gotten from Totosai on demons.

==== Koga ====
Voiced by: Taiki Matsuno (Japanese); Scott McNeil (Viz Media dub), Russell Wait (Animax Asia dub) (English)

Koga (鋼牙, Kōga) is a wolf demon who is the young leader of the Eastern Wolf Demon Tribe that Kagura and Naraku almost completely wiped out. He first meets Inuyasha as an opponent in battle. He becomes a reluctant, occasional ally despite maintaining a strong sense of rivalry about their relative combat strengths and the courtship of Kagome. After initially kidnapping her for her ability to locate Shikon shards, Koga becomes attracted to Kagome's kindness, spirit, and beauty. Inuyasha is always foul-tempered and jealous during Koga's visits because he worries that Kagome might have feelings for Koga, though she has only ever seen him as a friend.

==== Kaede ====
Voiced by: Hisako Kyōda, Mika Ito (young) (Japanese); Pam Hyatt (Inuyasha; Viz Media dub), Linda Darlow (Inuyasha: The Final Act and Yashahime; Viz Media dub), Jillian Michaels (young; Viz Media dub), Candice Moore (Animax Asia dub) (English)

Kaede (楓) is Kikyo's younger sister who assisted her with various tasks, such as gathering herbs or holding her quiver of arrows. After Kikyo's death, Kaede became an unusually strong shrine priestess in her own right and defended the village against demons. Kaede lost her right eye and wears an eyepatch over it. Supplementary information states that she "lost her elder sister and her eye in an incident fifty years ago."

==== Myoga ====
Voiced by: Kenichi Ogata (Japanese); Paul Dobson (Viz Media dub), Russell Wait (Animax Asia dub) (English)

Myoga (冥加, Myōga) is a flea demon in service to Toga who was assigned to guard Tetsusaiga's resting place before Inuyasha acquired it, accompanying him and later Moroha while providing them intel on topics that include current events and foes. He tends to run and hide during fights despite being a loyal retainer, his presence being a telltale sign of no present danger. Myoga enjoys drinking demon blood and actually saves Inuyasha's life at one point by drinking a spider demon's venom out of his blood.

==== Totosai ====
Voiced by: Jōji Yanami (Japanese); Richard Newman (Viz Media dub), Rik Thomas (Animax Asia dub) (English)

Totosai (刀々斎) is an elderly yōkai blacksmith with large, bulging eyes and the creator of Tessaiga and Tenseiga, from the fangs of his old friend, the Great Dog General, who entrusted him to help his two sons. As Inuyasha grows stronger and Sesshomaru grows more compassionate, they become more capable of mastering their respective swords, which Totosai strengthens accordingly. He spends most of his time at his forge inside a volcano, but sometimes travels elsewhere on a flying three-eyed ox named Mo-Mo (猛々).

=== Inuyasha antagonists ===
==== Naraku ====
Voiced by: Toshiyuki Morikawa, Hiroshi Yanaka (Onigumo) (Japanese); Paul Dobson (Viz Media dub), Russell Wait (Animax Asia dub) (English)

Naraku (奈落) is the main antagonist of the series, being the arch-enemy of Inuyasha and his friends. He is a half-demon originating from the corrupted human Onigumo (鬼蜘蛛), a bandit who cared for Kikyo, albeit in a twisted way. Paralyzed and consumed by desire, as well as jealousy towards Kikyo's and Inuyasha's relationship, Onigumo merges with demons through a pact with a Three-Eyed Spider (三ツ目蜘蛛), forming Naraku's body. Though created to pursue Kikyo, Naraku orchestrates her death and Inuyasha's imprisonment, then waits fifty years for the Shikon Jewel's return. Throughout the series, he continually modifies his form to purge his remaining humanity. His fate differs between media: Inuyasha destroys him with Meidō Zangetsuha in the manga, while Kagome's wish purifies him in the anime.

==== Demon of the Shikon Jewel ====
Voiced by: Tadahisa Saizen (Japanese); Michael Dobson (English)

Demon of the Shikon Jewel (四魂の玉を生み出した合体妖怪, Shikon no Tama o umidashita gattai yōkai; "Combined Yōkai Spawned by the Shikon no Tama") is the yōkai dragon created from numerous demons from ancient times that battled the priestess Midoriko before forcing the priestess to trap their souls in what became the Shikon Jewel. In the end, he is destroyed by Inuyasha's Meidō Zangetsuha in the manga, while purified by Kagome's wish in the anime version.

===== Magatsuhi =====
Voiced by: Takeshi Kusao (Japanese); Michael Dobson (English)

Magatsuhi (曲霊, "Devious Spirit") is the evil, corrupting presence within the Shikon Jewel, born from the spirit of the dragon demon, then his offshoot. His existence is eventually revealed to Inuyasha's group when Naraku gives him a temporary human-like body to act through to assist in restoring the Shikon Jewel, with the personal goal of defiling it completely. As would later be revealed, Magatsuhi is responsible for sealing Kagome's full spiritual power out of fear of the girl being a threat to him. After losing his temporary body due to Bakusaiga, Magatsuhi resorts to bodily possession before being stopped by Inuyasha with Dragon-Scaled Tetsusaiga with the power of the demon vortex, and killed by Sesshomaru with Tenseiga during the final battle against Naraku.

==== Naraku's incarnations ====
After acquiring enough Shikon Jewel shards, Naraku gained the ability to create new demons from his being that are technically his "offspring". However, each is treated by Naraku as expendable minions; tools to use as he wishes. He manipulated some of his earliest creations by threatening to destroy their disembodied hearts should they betray him. Naraku created eight detachments within the series' storyline.

===== Kanna =====
Voiced by: Yukana (Japanese); Janyse Jaud (English)

Kanna (神無) is Naraku's first detachment, appearing in the form of a ten-year-old girl in white with a mirror. Kanna is the only person that Naraku trusts with important information about his actions, allowing her to dictate in his stead. As a "concealed incarnation" of Naraku, Kanna has no scent or demonic aura, which makes her undetectable to Inuyasha, Miroku, and Kagome, and immune to demonic aura-related effects such as the Hakurei barrier. She is also nice to Kagura and informed of Naraku's warnings. She is immune to the Infant's ability to read hearts to know what someone is truly thinking, but possesses thoughts and feelings of her own.

===== Kagura =====
Voiced by: Izumi Ogami (Japanese); Janyse Jaud (English)

Kagura (神楽), Naraku's second detachment, is a wind-controlling witch who wields a fan to create razor-edged tornadoes and manipulate corpses. She travels using enlarged feather ornaments and harbors deep animosity toward Koga after exterminating his tribe. Though serving Naraku, she secretly pursues freedom, occasionally aiding Inuyasha's group while developing an attachment to Sesshomaru. Naraku ultimately poisons her during a false gift of her restored heart, leading to her fatal confrontation, where she dies in Sesshomaru's presence.

===== Goshinki =====
Voiced by: Masaharu Satō (Japanese); Michael Kopsa (English)

Goshinki (悟心鬼), Naraku's third detachment, is a horned oni with bladed elbows and razor-sharp fangs. His primary ability involves reading opponents' minds, similar to a Satori, allowing him to exploit weaknesses and evade attacks. During battle, he shatters Tetsusaiga, triggering Inuyasha's demonic transformation. Unable to predict the feral Inuyasha's movements, Goshinki is torn apart, leaving only his head intact. Sesshomaru later retrieves the remains, briefly reviving Goshinki so his fangs can forge the cursed sword Tokijin (闘鬼神) through Kaijinbo (灰刃坊)'s craftsmanship.

===== Juromaru and Kageromaru =====
Voiced by: Takumi Yamazaki (Japanese); Brian Drummond (English) (Both characters)

Juromaru (獣郎丸, Jūrōmaru) and Kageromaru (影郎丸, Kagerōmaru) are Naraku's fourth and fifth incarnations, respectively. While the more human-like Juromaru is like a berserker who is normally shackled with a mask covering his mouth, the parasitic Kageromaru uses his sickled arms to kill Naraku before being placed in his brother's stomach. Acting through a puppet, Naraku later removes the restraints on Juromaru so he and Kageromaru can slaughter Inuyasha's group and Koga. But the two fail and are killed by Inuyasha.

===== Muso/Onigumo =====
Voiced by: Hiroshi Yanaka (Japanese); Brian Dobson (English)

While technically Naraku's sixth incarnation, Muso (無双, Musō) is actually Onigumo himself. Originally faceless and without memory of his past, Onigumo took the face and name of a wandering monk. Eventually, with Kagura watching on Naraku's order, Muso ventures to Kikyo's former village and regains his memories of Onigumo and his desires for Kikyo. He sees Kagome with Inuyasha and, assuming she is Kikyo, fights him to possess Kagome. But Naraku absorbs Muso to stabilize his body.

===== Akago (the Infant) and Moryomaru =====
Voiced by: Ai Kobayashi (Japanese); Chiara Zanni (English) (Akago)
Voiced by: Masaki Terasoma (Japanese); Ross Douglas (English) (Moryomaru)

The Infant (赤子), Naraku's seventh detachment and embodied heart, appears as a talking baby capable of manipulating people through their inner darkness. Naraku intentionally designed this form, anticipating its cunning nature. Tasked with locating remaining Shikon Jewel shards through Kagome, the Infant exploits her jealousy regarding Inuyasha's feelings for Kikyo until Inuyasha intervenes. Naraku safeguards his heart by housing the Infant within the artificial body Moryomaru (魍魎丸). The Infant and Hakudoshi eventually conspire against Naraku, attempting to become his dominant aspect, but their creator ultimately reabsorbs them both.

===== Hakudoshi =====
Voiced by: Ai Kobayashi (Japanese); Chiara Zanni (English)

Hakudoshi (白童子), while calling himself Naraku's "essence" and eighth detachment, originates from the Infant's severed right half after a dying monk's attack. Matured into a barefoot boy skilled with weapons, he shares the Infant's abilities but lacks Naraku's heart, making him invulnerable to direct death. Hakudoshi tames the demon steed Entei (炎蹄) before its defeat by Inuyasha. Naraku ultimately destroys Hakudoshi by recalling his demonic wasps, enabling Miroku to consume him with the Wind Tunnel.

===== Byakuya =====
Voiced by: Mitsuaki Madono (Japanese); Michael Adamthwaite (English)

Byakuya (白夜), called Byakuya of the Illusions (夢幻の白夜), is Naraku's final detachment, a moth-demon specializing in illusions and origami magic. Designed to exist only while Naraku lives, he serves as an observer of Inuyasha and Moryomaru before actively supporting Naraku's plans. In the final battle, he absorbs a Meido Zangetsuha with his bladeless sword and wounds Kagome with a delayed attack set to activate upon Naraku's death. Inuyasha kills him moments later, but Byakuya dies content, having fulfilled his purpose.

==== The Band of Seven ====
The Band of Seven (七人隊, Shichinintai) were a group of human mercenaries that were killed a long time ago. They are resurrected in an undead state and manipulated by Naraku through Shikon Jewel shards to hold off his enemies during his time at Mount Hakurei.

===== Kyokotsu =====
Voiced by: Daisuke Gōri (Japanese); Dave "Squatch" Ward (English)

Kyokotsu (凶骨, Kyōkotsu) is a giant who happens to be both the largest of the Band of Seven and the weakest. Though a giant, Kyokotsu has developed a taste for demons. Kyokotsu terrorizes the wolf-demon tribes before being defeated by Koga in battle, who pulls out his Shikon shard and returns him to the dead.

===== Jakotsu =====
Voiced by: Ai Orikasa (Japanese); Jenn Forgie (English)

Jakotsu (蛇骨) is the Band of Seven's third-in-command and Bankotsu's most trusted ally. A homosexual and homicidal woman-hater who wears women's kimonos and sadistically kills his male opponents as a sign of affection. Jakotsu is armed with a snake-like sword that has segmented retractable blades that reach a great distance and bend at a moment's notice, making it difficult for an opponent to calculate his next move. When Inuyasha and his group arrive at Mount Hakurei, Jakotsu battles Inuyasha until he is defeated. The fight leaves Jakotsu severely weakened, and Renkotsu uses the opportunity to steal his Shikon shard.

===== Mukotsu =====
Voiced by: Tetsu Inada (Japanese); Trevor Devall (English)

Mukotsu (霧骨) is a short man who acts as the Band of Seven's poison maker, concealing his face behind a veil. He abducts Kagome out of lust, attempting to rape her (the anime depicts him initiating a wedding ceremony before Miroku and Sango come to their friend's aid). Though he succeeds in poisoning the human heroes, Mukotsu is killed by Sesshomaru.

===== Renkotsu =====
Voiced by: Tomokazu Sugita (Japanese); Brian Drummond (English)

Renkotsu (煉骨) is the second-in-command of the Band of Seven, who often uses wires and fire-breathing skills, and later a hand cannon. Renkotsu is the band's most intelligent member and secretly acts against Bankotsu by stealing their comrades' Shikon shards for his use. When Bankotsu learns of this, he kills Renkotsu.

===== Ginkotsu =====
Voiced by: Hisao Egawa (Japanese); Mark Gibbon (English)

Ginkotsu (銀骨) is a cyborg-like member of the Band of Seven, with a slew of different weapons, such as saw blades and a firearm on his back. Renkotsu maintains Ginkotsu's mechanical body before Inuyasha destroys it. Renkotsu then rebuilds Ginkotsu into a tank-like body. Eventually, Koga causes Ginkotsu to self-destruct by clogging his cannon with a piece of Renkotsu's armor. Subsequently, Renkotsu uses Ginkotsu's jewel shard to heal his wounds.

===== Suikotsu =====
Voiced by: Hiroaki Hirata (Japanese); Michael Donovan (English)

Suikotsu (睡骨) was originally a physician who developed a bloodthirsty second persona and is armed with artificial iron claws. After being revived, Suikotsu's good side attempts to live a normal life before his alter ego assumes control at the coaxing of his comrades. At one point, Suikotsu returns to the village with his normal "good" appearance, but is still violent and willing to kill. His good persona ultimately asks Kikyo to take his Shikon shard and kill him to prevent further carnage, but Jakotsu kills him before she can do so.

===== Bankotsu =====
Voiced by: Takeshi Kusao (Japanese); Matt Hill (English)

Bankotsu (蛮骨) is the leader of the Band of Seven, and its youngest and strongest member. Though a skilled mercenary who killed many people, Bankotsu retains a sense of honor and compassion where his comrades are concerned. Bankotsu carries the Zanbatō-like halberd Banryu (蛮竜, Banryū), a weapon he reclaims by attacking the daimyo who executed the band. Defeated by Inuyasha by slicing him in half based on the manga series, and when Inuyasha's Bakuryūha attack reflects Banryu's power.

=== Inuyasha guest characters ===
==== Feudal Japan characters ====
===== Hachiemon (Hachi) =====
Voiced by: Toshihiko Nakajima (Inuyasha), Chafurin (Yashahime) (Japanese); Terry Klassen (English)

Hachiemon (八衛門), otherwise known as simply Hachi (ハチ), is a tanuki from Awa who is a retainer to the tanuki of the Mamidaira clan before becoming Miroku's servant. His basic abilities are low, and he has no weapons or battle skills. He is an unremarkable being, but he understands Miroku well. Although Hachi is Miroku's servant, he often does not travel with him. Since he is a tanuki, he can transform. If he puts a leaf on his head and transforms, he can assume the form of a giant yellow gourd. He can fly in this state. When he runs away, he can lay down a smoke screen to deceive enemies.

===== Jinenji =====
Voiced by: Hisao Egawa (Japanese); Michael Dobson (English)

Jinenji (地念児) is a half-demon who lives in a hut with his human mother. Together, they grow a variety of medicinal plants, including some known for being powerful against poisons. He is first seen when Naraku's miasma poisons Kirara, and Inuyasha travels with Kagome to the village to find a cure. Because of his demon blood, the villagers falsely suspect him of killing people, but Jinenji is a gentle giant who is scared of humans because of the way they treat him.

===== Shiori =====
Voiced by: Kaori Mizuhashi (Japanese); Nicole Bouma (Inuyasha), Janice Kawaye (Yashahime: Princess Half-Demon) (English)

Shiori (紫織) is a half-demon who was born from a human mother named Shizu (紫津) and a bat demon father named Tsukuyomaru (月夜丸), who had died when she was an infant; murdered by his own father in cold blood. She helped grant Inuyasha's Tetsusaiga the useful ability to break through demon barriers, and even Naraku's for a time, after he saved her from her grandfather's grip. In the sequel series, after her mother died, Shiori established a haven for half-demon children to live in peace with Setsuna, one of her students.

===== Goryomaru =====
Voiced by: Masaki Terasoma (Japanese); Ross Douglas (English)

Goryomaru (御霊丸, Goryōmaru) was a monk who lived in an old temple with a group of orphaned kids. The children, whose parents were killed by demons, were rescued by him and were taken care of. Goryomaru was attacked by a demon, which tried to "absorb" him. While trying to overpower the demon, his arm was replaced by the demon's laser-shooting, cannon-like arm. The demon attached to his arm is later revealed to be Moryomaru, who can consume the rest of Goryomaru's body following his death at the hands of Hakudoshi.

===== Toga the Great Dog-Demon =====
Voiced by: Akio Otsuka (Japanese); Don Brown (Inuyasha), Mick Lauer (Yashahime: Princess Half-Demon) (English)

Toga (闘牙, Tōga), also known as the Dog General (犬の大将, Inu no Taishō; Great Dog General) or Great Dog Demon (犬の大妖怪, Inu no Daiyōkai), was an infamous yōkai lord of great power who ruled the Western Lands, having battled Kirinmaru during the Heian Era before they established a truce, as they joined forces to stop the Grim Comet. He fathered Sesshomaru with a dog demoness before he fell in love with Izayoi during the Kamakura era. Tōga was fatally wounded sealing Ryūkotsusei after being unable to defeat the dragon, meeting his end when he sacrificed himself to cover Izayoi's escape with their newborn son, Inuyasha, when her estate is burned to the ground.

===== Lady Izayoi =====
Voiced by: Kikuko Inoue (Japanese); Alaina Burnett (English)

Izayoi (十六夜), a noblewoman of the Kamakura Era, becomes Toga's lover and the mother of Inuyasha. After her spurned suitor, Takemaru, destroys her home, attempting to kill them, she raises Inuyasha before dying during his childhood. She leaves behind Toga's Robe of the Fire Rat and her rouge compact, which eventually passes to Kikyo, Kaede, and finally Moroha.

===== Hosenki I =====
Voiced by: Ryūzaburō Ōtomo (Japanese); Dave Pettitt (English)

Hosenki I (宝仙鬼一世) is an oyster-demon who creates magical jewels, including the black pearl in Inuyasha's eye that accesses his father's grave. When Inuyasha's group later seeks his help to return to the netherworld, they find only his son, who cannot yet make the pearls. They instead encounter Hosenki's spirit among the Dog General's bones, now corrupted by a tainted Shikon Jewel shard. After Naraku reclaims the shard, the purified Hosenki grants Inuyasha the Adamant Barrage (金剛槍破) technique as a reward for his loyalty.

===== Hosenki II =====
Voiced by: Shirō Saitō (Japanese); Peter New (Inuyasha), Frank Todaro (Yashahime: Princess Half-Demon) (English)

Hosenki II (宝仙鬼二世, Hōsenki-nisei) is an oyster demon who took over his father's duty of creating black pearls, as well as his father's name, after the latter's death. Hosenki II visits Riku to give him the green Rainbow Pearl, and later visits Kagome and Inuyasha at their house in Kaede's village, as he heard that Inuyasha inherited his father's powers with the Tetsusaiga: the Adamant Barrage.

===== Midoriko =====
Midoriko (翠子) was a powerful priestess who lived centuries before the series' events. She was well known for her vastly strong spiritual abilities, more specifically her ability to purify demon souls and spirits, rendering them completely powerless. It was because of this ability that she was both hated and feared by demons. In her final battle, she was ambushed by many yōkai. In the end, her spirit is dissolved by Naraku's wish to prepare the new place for Kagome in the manga, while purified by Kagome's wish in the anime version.

===== Naohi =====
Voiced by: Tōru Furuya (Japanese); Michael Adamthwaite (English)

Naohi (直霊, "Direct Spirit") is the goodwill of the Jewel of the Four Souls, that the four souls described are referenced as the four Mitamas from the Shintō philosophy of Naohi: Aramitama (荒魂; Courage) lit. 'Wild Soul', Nigimitama (和魂; Friendship) lit. 'Harmonious Soul', Kushimitama (奇魂; Wisdom) lit. 'Wondrous Soul' and Sakimitama (幸魂; lit. 'Blessed Soul').

===== Ginta =====
Voiced by: Hiroyuki Yoshino (Japanese); Paul Dobson (English)

Ginta (銀太) is a wolf demon from the Eastern Wolf Demon Tribe who consistently accompanies Koga alongside Hakkaku, serving as the second in command. They both deeply worry about Koga and Kagome since she is almost always in trouble with Inuyasha around.

===== Hakkaku =====
Voiced by: Daisuke Kishio (Japanese); Alistair Abell (English)

Hakkaku (白角) is a wolf demon from the Eastern Wolf Demon Tribe that always follows Koga around, alongside Ginta. They both deeply worry about Koga and Kagome since she is almost always in trouble with Inuyasha around.

===== Ayame =====
Voiced by: Yumi Kakazu (Japanese); Natalie Walters (English)

Ayame (菖蒲) is a red-haired wolf demon that appears only in the anime. She is the granddaughter of the Northern Wolf Demon Tribe's leader. Koga once saved her from the Birds of Paradise and promised to marry her when she got older. In the epilogue of the anime, Ayame finally married Koga.

===== Mushin =====
Voiced by: Yuzuru Fujimoto (Japanese); Alec Willows (English)

Mushin (夢心) is an elderly Buddhist monk who raised Miroku after the Wind Tunnel curse consumes his father. Despite being a lazy drunk who taught Miroku many of his bad lecherous habits, he cares for the young monk and is a father figure to him. In his first appearance, he was possessed by a demon worm charmer hired by Naraku to kill Miroku, but was saved by Inuyasha. Mushin is not seen in the manga again after this, but is given a slightly larger role in the anime.

==== Modern Japan characters ====
===== Kagome's Family =====
Mrs. Higurashi
Voiced by: Asako Dodo (Japanese); Cathy Weseluck (English)
Mrs. Higurashi (日暮夫人), the unnamed mother of Kagome and Sota. She raises both children with her father-in-law's assistance. Supportive of Kagome's travels to the feudal era, she regularly prepares meals for Kagome to share with Inuyasha and their companions.
Sota Higurashi
Voiced by: Akiko Nakagawa (Inuyasha and Inuyasha: The Final Act), Junya Enoki (Yashahime: Princess Half-Demon) (Japanese); Saffron Henderson (Inuyasha (first voice); Viz Media dub), Rebecca Shoichet (Inuyasha (second voice) and Inuyasha: The Final Act; Viz Media dub), Robbie Daymond (Yashahime: Princess Half-Demon) (English)
Sota Higurashi (日暮 草太, Higurashi Sōta) is Kagome's younger brother, with whom she has a typical brother-sister relationship. He sees Inuyasha as an older brother figure. In Yashahime, he adopted Inuyasha and Kagome's niece, Towa, as his daughter. He has an optimistic wife named Moe and a young daughter named Mei.
Grandpa
Voiced by: Ginzō Matsuo (first voice), Katsumi Suzuki (second voice) (Japanese); French Tickner (Inuyasha and Inuyasha: The Final Act), William Frederick Knight (Yashahime: Princess Half-Demon) (English)
Grandpa (じいちゃん, Jii-chan) is the paternal grandfather of Kagome and Sota, and Kagome's mother's father-in-law. Grandpa often covers for Kagome's prolonged absences at school with interesting, and often absurd, excuses, which only worries Kagome's friends further.
Buyo
Voiced by: Ginzō Matsuo (Japanese); Richard Ian Cox (Inuyasha), Andrew Russell (Yashahime: Princess Half-Demon) (English)
Buyo (ブヨ) is the Higurashis' cat, who was the reason Kagome first found the Bone Eater's Well while she was looking for him. Inuyasha often plays with Buyo when he visits Kagome in her time. In Yashahime, Buyo is the first to encounter Towa in front of the Sacred Tree after she is catapulted to the modern era.

===== Kagome's Middle School =====
Hojo
Voiced by: Yūji Ueda (Japanese); Matt Smith (English)
Hojo (北条) is Kagome's classmate who harbors unrequited feelings for her. Despite Kagome consistently forgetting or abandoning their planned dates to return to the feudal era, Hojo persists under the mistaken belief she suffers from various illnesses - excuses fabricated by her grandfather to explain her absences. He regularly provides traditional remedies for these fictitious conditions, some of which her grandfather appropriates. By Inuyasha: The Final Act, Hojo moves on, appearing with a college girlfriend.
Ayumi
Voiced by: Nami Okamoto (Japanese); Cathy Weseluck (English)
Ayumi (あゆみ) is one of Kagome's friends and classmates. She has wavy shoulder-length black hair. Being the naive, optimistic, gentle one of the trio, she is the only one of the group to support Kagome's relationship with Inuyasha. In the anime version of Inuyasha: The Final Act, as she graduated from high school, she wanted to become an interpreter, and in the manga version, she wanted to become a translator.
Eri
Voiced by: Yuki Masuda (Japanese); Saffron Henderson (first voice), Rebecca Shoichet (second voice) (English)
Eri (絵理) is one of Kagome's friends and classmates. She has straight shoulder-length black hair and is frequently shown wearing a yellow headband. Like Yuka, she is very outspoken and concerned with Kagome's relationship health, and because of this, she never hesitates to give her opinion on Kagome's potential boyfriends (Hojo and Inuyasha).
Yuka
Voiced by: Kaori Shimizu (Japanese); Jillian Michaels (English)
Yuka (由加) is one of Kagome's friends and classmates. Yuka has neck-length brown hair. Being the most outspoken of the trio, as well as being very sharp-witted, she often expresses concern over Kagome's relationship with her "delinquent boyfriend", Inuyasha.

== Recurring Yashahime characters ==
=== Yashahime supporting characters ===
==== Yashahime Feudal Japan characters ====
===== Kin'u and Gyokuto =====
Voiced by: Aya Gomazuru (Kin'u), Hitomi Ueda (Gyokuto) (Japanese); Jillian Michaels (Inuyasha: The Final Act epilogue), Jackie Lastra (Kin'u), Michelle Marie (Gyokuto) (English)

Kin'u (金烏) and Gyokuto (玉兎) are the identical twin daughters of Miroku and Sango and the older sisters of Hisui. Their first appearance was at the end of the Inuyasha when they were about two years old. Kin'u wears a Green kimono, whereas Gyokuto wears a Pink kimono. In Princess Half-Demon, Gyokuto is with her mother in the demon slayer village. Kin'u is a nun who is undergoing upper-level training to further develop and increase her innate Buddhist-spiritual abilities by her monk father.

===== Hisui =====
Voiced by: Takehiro Urao, Larissa Tago Takeda (as baby) (Japanese); Aleks Le, Michelle Marie (as baby) (English)

Hisui (翡翠) is Miroku and Sango's youngest child and only son, and younger brother to Kin'u and Gyokuto. His first appearance is at the end of the Inuyasha as a baby. In Yashahime: Princess Half-Demon, he has become a demon slayer, having inherited an ordinary Hiraikotsu from his mother. It is revealed in the second-season finale of the spin-off that he is in love with Setsuna.

===== Lord Takechiyo =====
Voiced by: Fairouz Ai (Japanese); Ryan Bartley (English)

Takechiyo (竹千代) is a young tanuki who serves under Jyubei, later revealed to be the young lord of the Mamidaira clan, who was placed in Jyubei's care by Miroku at the behest of Hachimon. He uses his shapeshifting abilities as a means to transport others to places for profit, or when bribed with Towa's modern sweets.

===== Riku =====
Voiced by: Jun Fukuyama (Japanese); Zach Aguilar (English)

Riku (理玖) is Jyubei and Takechiyo's mysterious employer who intends to obtain all seven of the Rainbow Pearls for himself. He later develops feelings for Towa and tries to protect her and her family from harm. It is later revealed that he is, in fact, a living doll created from Kirinmaru's severed horn and is in the service of Zero to return her emotions by collecting the seven Rainbow Pearls for their creator, who had taken care of him since he was "discarded like a piece of trash." He becomes Towa's love interest.

===== Jyubei =====
Voiced by: Tsuyoshi Koyama (Japanese); Arthur Romeo (English)

Jyubei (獣兵衛, Jūbei) is the owner of the corpse-dealing shop that specializes in bounties placed on demons. Moroha currently lives under Jyubei's shop to pay off a very large debt.

==== Yashahime Modern Japan characters ====
===== Mei Higurashi =====
Voiced by: Haruka Terui (Japanese); Xanthe Huynh (English)

Mei Higurashi (日暮 芽衣, Higurashi Mei) is the six-year-old daughter of Sota and Moe Higurashi, younger adoptive sister and half-cousin-in-law of Towa, and half-cousin-in-law of Setsuna, and the niece of Kagome Higurashi, and the first cousin of Moroha.

===== Moe Higurashi =====
Voiced by: Eriko Matsui (Japanese); Erika Harlacher (English)

Moe Higurashi (日暮 萌, Higurashi Moe) is the wife of Sota Higurashi and the mother of Mei Higurashi, adoptive mother and half-aunt-in-law of Towa, half-aunt-in-law of Setsuna, and the maternal aunt of Moroha, and she is sister-in-law to Kagome Higurashi.

=== Yashahime antagonist characters ===
==== Kirinmaru ====
Voiced by: Yoshimasa Hosoya (Japanese); Crispin Freeman (English)

Kirinmaru (麒麟丸) is an ancient qilin demon wielding the Bakuseiken (爆星剣) katana. Once a rival to Tōga, he lost his right arm and horn to the dog demon before establishing a truce to combat the Grim Comet. Ignoring Tōga's warning, Kirinmaru brought his daughter Rion into battle, resulting in her death at the hands of the half-demon Sakasa (逆叉). He subsequently bound her soul to the living world, dismissing the Shikon Jewel's prophecy of his death by a half-demon's hand. When the Grim Comet threatens to return, Kirinmaru allies with Osamu Kirin to redirect it to their timeline, seeking to destroy it and cement his supremacy. This forces the Sacred Tree of Ages to task Towa, Setsuna, and Moroha with preventing the resulting temporal catastrophe.

==== Zero ====
Voiced by: Maaya Sakamoto (Japanese); Carrie Keranen (English)

Zero (是露), Kirinmaru's sister, obsesses over Tōga and creates the Rainbow Pearls from her grief after failing to prevent his foretold death. She targets Sesshomaru's twins, first through Joka (女禍) (foiled by Jaken's barrier) and later by cursing Rin with the Silver-Scale Curse linked by a red thread of fate. After manipulating events for years, she ultimately orchestrates her own death through Towa's hands, only for Setsuna to sever her connection to Tōga. In her final moments, she lifts Rin's curse, explains Kirinmaru's motives, and achieves nirvana.

==== Rion ====
Voiced by: Saki Fujita (Japanese); Lisa Reimold (English)

Rion (りおん) is the fourteen-year-old daughter of Kirinmaru, whose spirit has been sealed away by her father on Mount Musubi for 600 years after she was killed by a half-demon named Sakasa, who took her hostage to avenge his master's death. Once rescued by the Half-Demon Princesses, Rion transferred her mind and spirit into a clay doll containing her bones and grave's soil and achieved an artificial human-looking form similar to Kikyo. She became a traveling companion of Riku, traveling briefly with Towa while her aunt Zero was threatening the young half-demon girl's life, and sought to stop her father.

==== Osamu Kirin ====
Voiced by: Yoshimasa Hosoya (Japanese); Crispin Freeman (English)

Osamu Kirin (希林 理) serves as an English teacher at Saint Gabriel Academy and Towa's homeroom instructor. Created from Kirinmaru's discarded right arm and deposited in the Bone-Eater's Well, he exists to monitor the Grim Comet's approach for transport to the past. After adapting to the modern era's demon-less society, he tracks the comet's impending collision during the Reiwa period. Upon discovering Rion's fate, Kirin redirects the comet to the feudal era to exterminate all demons except himself and Rion, intending to govern humanity. The Half-Demon Princesses ultimately defeat him, with Rion delivering the final strike.

==== Grim Comet ====
Grim Comet (妖霊星) is a cosmic cocoon housing the primordial Grim Butterfly (妖霊蝶), returning to Earth every 500 years. Tōga and Kirinmaru first destroyed one of its demon-infested fragments during the Heian period. Inuyasha and Sesshomaru repeated this feat centuries later. Kirinmaru dispatches Osamu Kirin to intercept its return, but Osamu instead awakens the Grim Butterfly to exterminate all demons except himself and Rion, intending to rule humanity.

==== The Four Perils ====
The Four Perils (四凶, Shikyō) are a quartet of demons that serve under Kirinmaru, each entrusted with a Rainbow Pearl, with Riku orchestrating their deaths.

===== Kyūki =====
Voiced by: Toa Yukinari (Japanese); Dawn M. Bennett (English)

Kyūki (窮奇), one of Kirinmaru's Four Perils, commands the Purple Rainbow Pearl and assumes a winged tiger form. She tasks the owl demon Yotsume (夜爪) with exploiting the Half-Demon Princesses' psychological weaknesses through dream manipulation. Towa defeats her with an Azure Dragon Wave, enabling Riku to claim the pearl by fatally draining her fluids.

===== Tōkotsu =====
Voiced by: Taro Kiuchi (Japanese); Imari Williams (English)

Tōkotsu (檮杌), one of Kirinmaru's Four Perils, wields a red Rainbow Pearl until Moroha kills him. Resurrected as a specter by his son Jakotsumaru, he is ultimately defeated when Setsuna unleashes her sealed Buddhist powers, and Towa banishes him permanently.

===== Konton =====
Voiced by: Hiroki Yasumoto (Japanese); Armen Taylor (English)

Konton (渾沌) is one of Kirinmaru's Four Perils. After Kyūki is defeated, he takes over, trying to annihilate the demon princesses. He has the blue Rainbow Pearl in his second armor after Moroha produced the Crimson Backlash Wave from her Crimson Dragon Wave and her mentor, the wolf demon Yawaragi: the Scattering Winds.

===== Tōtetsu =====
Voiced by: Hiroshi Shirokuma (Japanese); Paul St. Peter (English)

Tōtetsu (饕餮) is the last of Kirinmaru's Four Perils to appear.

==== Jakotsumaru ====
Voiced by: Yūko Sanpei (Japanese); Marin Miller (English)

Jakotsumaru (若骨丸) was the son of Tōkotsu, whom he wanted to revitalize by giving him enough bones from mortals, demons, and animals, and after that, turn the bones red to resurrect his father.
