= Inuyasha: The Final Act =

Japanese anime television series

- Cover of the "Complete Series" set by Viz Media
- No. of episodes: 26

Release
- Original network: NTV, ytv
- Original release: October 4, 2009 – March 30, 2010

Season chronology
- ← Previous; Season 4

The Japanese anime television series Inuyasha: The Final Act (犬夜叉 完結編, Inuyasha Kanketsu-Hen) is the direct sequel to the Inuyasha anime series, and is based on the last 21 volumes of the manga series by Rumiko Takahashi. The series concludes with Inuyasha and his friends, finding the last fragments of the Sacred Jewel of Four Souls and fighting against Naraku. Viz Media licensed the series as InuYasha: The Final Act. The original staff and cast from the first Inuyasha anime adaptation were brought back together for the new series. The series premiered first on Nippon Television on October 4, 2009, and concluded first on Yomiuri TV on March 30, 2010, due to NTV finishing its initial series broadcast days behind ytv due to a 1-week broadcast suspension on January 3, 2010.

Viz Media licensed the new adaptation before it premiered and aired its English subtitled version online through Hulu, releasing episodes within a day of the original Japanese air dates. On April 14, 2013, the series remained available for free on Hulu in the United States. As of episode 14, the English episode aired first. Animax Asia aired the series with their own English subtitles, on its television stations and its online video service. The series is available to stream on Netflix in Canada.

Voice actress Kelly Sheridan was the first to announce through her Facebook fan page on May 11, 2010, that work on the English dub for The Final Act had begun. However, many of the cast were laid off: Moneca Stori was replaced from her role of Kagome Higurashi by Kira Tozer, David Kaye was replaced as Sesshomaru by Michael Daingerfield, Pam Hyatt was replaced as Kaede by Linda Darlow, and Danny McKinnon was replaced as Kohaku by Aidan Drummond. Kirby Morrow, the voice of Miroku, said on Voiceprint with Trevor Devall and guests that Michael Daingerfield was able to mimic David Kaye near perfectly. On December 17, 2010, Paul Dobson announced on a podcast episode of Voiceprint with Trevor Devall and guests that he would be going back to the Ocean Productions studio for his final recording session of Inuyasha: The Final Act on December 23, 2010. Viz Media released Inuyasha: The Final Act set 1 on Blu-ray and DVD on November 20, 2012, and set 2 was released February 12, 2013.

The English dub, Inuyasha: The Final Act, began broadcasting in the United States on Viz Media's online network, Neon Alley, on October 2, 2012. On October 24, 2014, Adult Swim announced that Inuyasha: The Final Act would air on the Toonami programming block beginning on November 15, 2014. Previously, on March 1, 2014, Adult Swim had announced they had lost the broadcast rights to the original Inuyasha series.

Four pieces of theme music were used, one opening and three endings. "Kimi ga Inai Mirai" by Do As Infinity was the opening theme song for the series, used throughout the series. "With You" by AAA was the first ending from episode one to nine. The second ending was "Diamond" by Alan from episode ten to seventeen. The third and final ending theme was "Tōi Michi no Saki de" (遠い道の先で; "The Long Road Ahead") by Ai Takekawa from episode eighteen to twenty-six.

== Episode list ==
No. overall	No. in series	Title	Directed by	Storyboarded by	Original release date	English air date
168	1	"Naraku's Heart"; Transliteration: "Naraku no Shinzō" (Japanese: 奈落の心臓)	Shinya Watada	Yasunao Aoki	October 4, 2009	October 2, 2012
Hakudoshi tricks Kagura into freeing Goryomaru, in exchange for her freedom from Naraku by collecting the remaining Shikon Jewel shards. After stealing a jewel shard from Kagome, Hakudoshi notices that Kagura betrayed him, due to her being moved by Kohaku's determination. Inuyasha and his friends confront Hakudoshi, while Kagura sends Kohaku off. Hakudoshi gives the jewel shard to Goryomaru, disguised as Moryomaru, and sends him after Kohaku. After Naraku disables the barrier and withdraws the Saimyōshō, Miroku kills Hakudoshi with his Wind Tunnel. Knowing that Naraku is keeping her heart, Kagura flees after having revealed that The Infant, which contains Naraku's heart, resides inside Moryomaru. When Sango finds Kohaku before the others, she learns that he has regained his memory that they were siblings. Since The Infant has the heart, Moryomaru flees to grow stronger. Kohaku reconciles with Sango. Elsewhere, Kikyo is slowly weakening, to the point of her spiritual shield failing to keep novice monks away.
169	2	"Kagura's Wind"; Transliteration: "Kagura no Kaze" (Japanese: 神楽の風)	Satoshi Toba	Yasunao Aoki	October 11, 2009	October 12, 2012
Kikyo continues to weaken due to Naraku's miasma eating away at her from within, and summons the soul of the priestess Midoriko to restore her powers. She explains to Inuyasha that in order to destroy Naraku, the Shikon Jewel must be completed and purified with Naraku the moment he absorbs it. Kohaku trails her and tells Inuyasha to tell the others. Meanwhile, Koga completes a series of trials to obtain the Goraishi, a treasure of his clan. He succeeds and gains the clawed weapon and protection of the spirits of his ancestors that will keep Midoriko's will from freezing his legs in place only one time. Naraku returns Kagura's heart and wounds the latter, leaving her on the brink of death. After escaping, Kagura goes to a meadow of flowers. Sesshomaru battles Moryomaru, who has acquired the armor of a turtle demon named Meioju after devouring it. After destroying Tōkijin and forcing Moryomaru to retreat, Sesshomaru finds Kagura dying in the meadow.
170	3	"Meido Zangetsuha"; Transliteration: "Meidō Zangetsuha" (Japanese: 冥道残月破)	Takahiko Kyōgoku	Hitoyuki Matsui	October 18, 2009	October 19, 2012
Totosai tells Sesshomaru that the Tenseiga can now be reforged into an offensive weapon, since Sesshomaru experiences rage and sorrow for someone other than himself. In the present day, Kagome's grandfather tells her that the Shikon Jewel can only be erased from the world by making a correct wish. However, their conversation deviates from her worries about passing her academic studies. Elsewhere, Inuyasha and the others find an inn, where fox demons play tricks on others to try to advance in demon rank. As some of the fox demons disguise themselves as beautiful women, Miroku has no problems with being tricked, much to Sango's discontent. After accidentally entering the test, Shippo plays several tricks on Inuyasha, clobbering him each time. Shippo retreats into the forest where he meets a girl named Mujina, determined to avenge her father by using her sword to absorb demonic energy. After Mujina absorbs demonic energy from Inuyasha's Tetsusaiga a few times, Inuyasha blocks the released attack and uncovers Mujina to be a fat, badger demon (mujina) in disguise before sending him into the sky. Meanwhile, Sesshomaru learns the Meido Zangetsuha technique, which cuts a small path to the Underworld and sends one's opponent there directly. Sesshomaru gains a powerful offensive technique for Tenseiga.
171	4	"The Dragon-Scaled Tetsusaiga"; Transliteration: "Ryūrin no Tessaiga" (Japanese: 竜鱗の鉄砕牙)	Yasuo Iwamoto	Yasunao Aoki	October 25, 2009	October 26, 2012
Inuyasha's group rescues a swordsmith named Toshu from the demon Ryujin, who is after Toshu's Dakki, a sword designed to absorb demonic energy. After Inuyasha injures Ryujin, Toshu stabs him with the sword, taking away his demonic energy to complete the blade. However, Toshu attempts to steal Tetsusaiga's demonic energy, though this slowly begins to turn Toshu into a demon. The demonic energy proves to be too strong for Dakki to control fully, as it transfers the damage of absorption into Toshu, thereby killing him. After Dakki breaks and releases its power, Tetsusaiga gains Dakki's ability to absorb great amounts of demonic energy. Meanwhile, Naraku's latest incarnation, Byakuya, has ordered a young wolf demon to steal Koga's shards in exchange for his younger brother, Shinta. The youth brings Koga to Byakuya, who proceeds to send Shinta away with a moth demon. Moryomaru catches it and almost absorbs Shinta. However, while Shinta is rescued, Moryomaru gets the jewel shard. Inuyasha's arrival with his new dragon-scaled Tetsusaiga reluctantly allows Moryomaru to absorb the Adamant Spears, but the overwhelming power forces Moryomaru to flee. However, Tetsusaiga begins to backfire, leaving Inuyasha wounded and bewildered. Byakuya tells Naraku that Tetsusaiga would succeed in eradicating its opponent or wielder.
172	5	"The Great Holy Demon Spirit's Test"; Transliteration: "Yōrei Taisei no Shiren" (Japanese: 妖霊大聖の試練)	Takeshi Furuta	Kenji Kodama	November 1, 2009	November 2, 2012
Kohaku joins Kikyo, willing to give up his shard if it means killing Naraku, while Koga leaves Ginta and Hakkaku behind because of the increasing danger. Meanwhile, Moryomaru devours the twin demons Kinka and Ginka, obtaining their fire and lightning abilities to strengthen his armor. Sesshomaru attempts to use the Meido Zangetsuha to send some of Moryomaru to the Underworld, but Byakuya interferes on Naraku's orders. Totosai sends Inuyasha and his group to see the demon hermit Yorei-Taisei in mastering his new sword. Upon arriving at his house, they realize that Yorei-Taisei is missing his internal organs, and all the villagers were turned into the form of demons by an organ thief, who is a real demon blended among the villagers. Yorei-Taisei wraps Tetsusaiga in chains to disallow Inuyasha from drawing it until facing the organ thief. Inuyasha comes across a female serpent demon, and all but Kagome are swept away when trying to help Inuyasha defeat her. When Inuyasha returns to Yorei-Taisei's home with Kagome, he faces a male ox demon. Inuyasha uses his nose to locate Yorei-Taisei's demonic energy manifested around the demon in the form of vortexes. He cuts the right vortex, clearing the hermit's test, but there is one final technique that Inuyasha has yet to discover.
173	6	"The End of Moryomaru"; Transliteration: "Mōryōmaru no Saigo" (Japanese: 魍魎丸の最期)	Atsushi Yano	Hitoyuki Matsui	November 8, 2009	November 9, 2012
Naraku absorbs a demonic tree named Yomeiju. Kikyo crosses paths with Koga for the first time, after Moryomaru bursts from a mountain without catching their sight. Inuyasha and his friends discover Moryomaru and Naraku fighting. Moryomaru traps Naraku and Koga, in order to steal the incomplete jewel. However, Naraku kills Moryomaru and the Infant by absorbing them. Koga frees himself, and Miroku attempts to destroy Naraku's heart with the Wind Tunnel. He fails, but sucks in the Fuyōheki before succumbing to the poison.
174	7	"The Mausoleum of Mount Azusa"; Transliteration: "Azusayama no Reibyō" (Japanese: 梓山の霊廟)	Shinya Watada	Shinya Watada	November 15, 2009	November 16, 2012
Kikyo uses the life-force to heal Miroku, though this causes her chest wound to reopen again. Naraku traps Onigumo, gaining the abilities to use spiderwebs. He lures Kikyo to cancel out her unusually strong purification powers and leaving her to be infected with his will. Inuyasha and Kagome are entangled by spiderwebs after arriving at the shrine. Kagome sees a vision between Inuyasha and Kikyo. Kagome tries to use Kikyo's longbow to heal her, but the bowstring snaps due to the resulting defilement of the spiderwebs. Kikyo instructs Kagome to go to the Mausoleum of Mount Azusa to obtain a special longbow in order to save her. Meanwhile, Byakuya finds Kohaku and poisons him with snakes, but leaves when Sesshormaru's group shows up to save Kohaku. At the top of the sacred mountain, the spirit guardian, in the form of Kikyo, gives Kagome the longbow, but Kagome is tested when she tries to leave, ending up dangled from a cliff. Kikyo appears to her and questions her desire to save Kikyo, but Kagome learns it was just an image of Kikyo created from her own insecurities. Kagome passes the test and obtains the sacred longbow of Mount Azusa, and falls into the abyss below the cliff.
175	8	"Among the Twinkling Stars"; Transliteration: "Hoshiboshi Kirameki no Aida ni" (Japanese: 星々きらめきの間に)	Satoshi Toba	Atsuo Tobe	November 22, 2009	November 23, 2012
After Inuyasha saves Kagome, Naraku captures the rest of the group, intending to acquire Koga's two jewel shards, but cannot defile the purity. Kagome cannot use the sacred longbow. Naraku drops Kikyo and his body opens up, revealing the portal where Koga charges and gets trapped. As Miroku and Inuyasha save Koga, Naraku retrieves two jewel shards. When Kikyo has the Shikon Jewel, she asks Kagome to shoot her and purify her wounds. It purifies the Shikon Jewel, and Kikyo's soul collectors guide the arrow at Naraku to try purifying him and the Shikon Jewel. However, his demonic energy overwhelms Kikyo and taints the Shikon Jewel, rendering her powerless and on the verge of death. Naraku flees, due to being wounded from the attack. The others watch Inuyasha mourning Kikyo, and her spirit ascends into the sky.
176	9	"Sesshomaru in the Underworld"; Transliteration: "Meikai no Sesshōmaru" (Japanese: 冥界の殺生丸)	Takeshi Furuta	Kenji Kodama	November 29, 2009	November 30, 2012
Without the jewel shards, Koga, Ginta, and Hakkaku leave the others. Meanwhile, Sesshomaru visits his mother to strengthen the power of Meido Zangetsuha, so she summons a hellhound from her Meido Stone for her son to battle, which takes Kohaku and Rin into the void of the Underworld. Sesshomaru follows them into the void and defeats the hellhound to rescue them, but Kohaku later notices that Rin is dying. The darkness envelopes Rin, and Sesshomaru confronts the Guardian of the Underworld to rescue her. However, Sesshomaru realizes he cannot save Rin, having already done so in the past. After purifying the corpses of the Underworld, Sesshormaru uses Meido Zangetsuha, this time a much wider pathway, back to the physical world. After Sesshomaru is scolded for thinking he could cheat death simply because he carries Tenseiga, the sword of Heaven, his mother revives Rin using her Meido Stone. Before Sesshomaru's group departs, Sesshomaru's mother warns Kohaku that even though his life has been unnaturally prolonged by the jewel shard, Tenseiga will not save him.
177	10	"Flowers Drenched in Sadness"; Transliteration: "Kanashimi ni Nureru Hana" (Japanese: 悲しみに濡れる花)	Noriaki Saito	Masato Sato	December 6, 2009	December 7, 2012
Kanna discards the fan from the meadow to the pond and Naraku recovers from the previous battle. Despite his efforts to defile the Shikon Jewel, a speck of pure light remains, much to his irritation. Elsewhere, Inuyasha and his group arrive in flower-filled village, where the villagers are disturbingly happy. They discover a demon called the Flower Prince, who uses his magic to drain all sorrow and pain from the hearts of others, allowing them peace before making them part of the soil. Inuyasha, still carrying grief over Kikyo, is easily snared in an illusion, where she offers to go to the afterlife with him. After briefly becoming ensnared by the demon herself, Kagome kills the Flower Prince, removing all flowers from the village. Meanwhile, Kanna lures Inuyasha and his friends into a trap. This succeeds when she and the mirror demon emerge from the pond and steal all of Tetsusaiga's powers.
178	11	"Kanna's Gravestone"; Transliteration: "Kanna no Bohyō" (Japanese: 神無の墓標)	Takahiko Kyōgoku	Kenji Kodama	December 13, 2009	December 14, 2012
The mirror demon follows Inuyasha and his friends to the cave. Tetsusaiga draws out the power of Inuyasha's full-demon state to make him fight. Kanna heals the mirror demon's injuries by transferring them to herself. Inuyasha switches his target to the replica Tetsusaiga and successfully breaks it, restoring the power to his own sword and his body to his normal half-demon state. Although Kanna suffers damage from the mirror demon, she defies Naraku. Before Naraku kills Kanna, one of the shards pierces Kagome's eye, and she hears Kanna saying that the "light will destroy Naraku". Kagome explains to the rest that Kanna wanted to live, being the reason why she wanted Kagome to hear the last words.
179	12	"Sango's Feelings, Miroku's Resolve"; Transliteration: "Sango no Omoi, Miroku no Kakugo" (Japanese: 珊瑚の想い 弥勒の覚悟)	Atsushi Yano	Masashi Kojima	December 20, 2009	December 21, 2012
Facing off against a bone-collecting demon, Miroku is poisoned when using the Wind Tunnel, and Sango coats Hiraikotsu in a corrosive poison and uses it to destroy the demon, to which Inuyasha charges in to kill the demon's master. Myoga suggests to have Hiraikotsu repaired by the Master of Potions, seen as a drunken sage. The Master of Potions dissolves Hiraikotsu into a jug of alcohol. Sango jumps into another jug to pacify the demons that were used to create Hiraikotsu. Meanwhile, the Master of Potions talks in secret with Miroku, offering him a medicinal yet poisonous drink that will null any pain from intake of miasma or poison, though it will not actually prevent it from spreading, as it is the price to pay to continue protecting Sango. The demons of Hiraikotsu, angry with Sango but eventually accepting the fact that she would sacrifice herself if it means saving Miroku, allow to fully restore her weapon. However, the Master of Potions explains that Hiraikotsu has changed in some way due to his herbs and poisons.
180	13	"A Complete Meido"; Transliteration: "Kanzen na Meidō" (Japanese: 完全な冥道)	Satoshi Toba	Mitsuko Kase	December 27, 2009	December 28, 2012
Sesshomaru confronts Shishinki, who has a complete Meido Zangetsuha, claiming that Tōga has the stolen technique. Shishinki even absorbs Sesshomaru's attempt at doing Meido Zangetsuha. He taunts Sesshomaru, telling him that he must have been shunned by his father since Tetsusaiga should have belong to Sesshomaru. Inuyasha interferes the battle, but Sesshormaru stops him. As the battle continues, Myoga explains to Sesshomaru that his father entrusted him with Tenseiga, already knowing he can master the Meido Zangetsuha. Although Shishinki, unleashing multiple attacks of Meido Zangetsuha, doubts this would happen, Sesshomaru proves him wrong by launching a massive complete Meido Zangetsuha, trapping Shishinki. Inuyasha tries to convince Sesshomaru that Tenseiga is a proper keepsake, but Sesshomaru states that they are destined to fight one another for the rest of their lives.
181	14	"In Pursuit of Naraku"; Transliteration: "Naraku no Tsuigeki" (Japanese: 奈落の追撃)	Takeshi Furuta	Masato Sato	January 5, 2010	January 4, 2013
Byakuya arrives to see the aftermath of the battle between Sesshomaru and Shishinki. Meanwhile, Totosai confirms that Sesshomaru's father gave him Tenseiga so Meido Zangetsuha could be perfected, then have Tetsusaiga reabsorb it. Naraku chases Kohaku, but learns that the jewel shard is still purified by Kikyo's spiritual power. Kohaku distracts Naraku, while Jaken and Rin flee. Inuyasha's group confront Byakuya, who tries to taunt Sango by claiming Kohaku runs from her to forget his past, but yet she states would still fight for him when he needs her. She attacks with Hiraikotsu and to her surprise, it now has its own demonic energy and it can injure Naraku. Although Inuyasha, Kagome and Miroku each try to attack him, the severely wounded Naraku manages to flee. Afterward, Kohaku tells them that because the jewel shard is still pure, they can use it in the final battle with Naraku.
182	15	"True Heir"; Transliteration: "Seitōnaru Keishōsha" (Japanese: 正統なる継承者)	Shinya Watada	Yasunao Aoki	January 12, 2010	January 11, 2013
Sesshomaru receives the fragment of Kanna's mirror from Byakuya. He uses it to make Tenseiga replicate Tetsusaiga's powers and abilities, and challenges Inuyasha to a battle to test his worthiness to wield their father's fang of destruction. Every time the swords cross, Tetsusaiga regains some of its powers and abilities. Sesshomaru uses Meido Zangetsuha on Inuyasha and throws Tenseiga inside, but Inuyasha cut through his demonic energy to save himself. Naraku tries to control Tenseiga through Kanna's mirror, but Sesshomaru jumps inside Meido Zangetsuha and Inuyasha breaks Tenseiga. Tetsusaiga's blade becomes black, Inuyasha uses Meido Zangetsuha to exit the Underworld and the broken Tenseiga comes back anew. Now freed from his obsession with Tetsusaiga, Sesshomaru is one step away from obtaining a much more powerful weapon of his own that is not inherited from his father.
183	16	"Hitomiko's Barrier"; Transliteration: "Hitomiko no kekkai" (Japanese: 瞳子の結界)	Noriaki Akitaya	Kenji Kodama	January 19, 2010	January 18, 2013
Naraku manipulates Hitomiko, a priestess with unusually strong and powerful spiritual powers and abilities that he met fifteen years ago. Using the Shikon Jewel, he keeps her alive to control her. They erect an incredibly strong and powerful barrier, and trap Kagome in the shrine. Kagome shoots the spider controlling Hitomiko, though she worries this will corrupt both her soul and spiritual powers. When she fires her sacred arrow, a huge light purple glowing ray of intense spiritual power shoots out and Hitomiko dies peacefully, after telling Kagome that she can sense that her spiritual powers are highly extensive, but are somehow sealed.
184	17	"Magatsuhi's Evil Will"; Transliteration: "Magatsuhi no Janen" (Japanese: 曲霊の邪念)	Satoshi Toba	Hitoyuki Matsui	January 26, 2010	January 25, 2013
Inuyasha tells Kaede about Kikyo. Kaede states that Kagome's innate spiritual power was probably sealed by Magatsuhi, the evil will of the Shikon Jewel who did so out of fear. Meanwhile, as a countermeasure against Kikyo's spiritual power, Naraku provides some of his flesh to give Magatsuhi a physical form, ordering him to retrieve Kohaku's jewel shard. Sesshomaru struggles to defend the boy without a weapon or a left arm. Inuyasha's group arrives to find Sesshomaru's right arm badly wounded and Kohaku's shard being defiled. After Magatsuhi renders Kagome unconscious, Sesshomaru heals his wounds and assumes his true form to attack, but no effect. The brothers struggle to battle Magatsuhi, while protecting their respective groups. Sesshomaru ends up speared and trapped in a ball of appendages, yet he bursts through. When Totosai appears, Sesshomaru's left arm is restored and he wields a new sword named Bakusaiga, able to destroy whatever he cuts, forcing Magatsuhi to flee after destroying the vessel. Soon after, Kagome wakes up with a puzzled expression on her face.
185	18	"The Day of Days"; Transliteration: "Jinsei no Ichidaiji" (Japanese: 人生の一大事)	Takahiko Kyōgoku	Takahiko Kyōgoku	February 2, 2010	February 1, 2013
Inuyasha and Sesshomaru's groups go to Kaede's village, where Kohaku remains unconscious due to the defilement of the jewel shard, but not even Kagome can purify it, seemingly due to Magatsuhi's mental attack against her. After Totosai makes a scabbard for Bakusaiga, Sesshomaru leaves Jaken, Rin, and Kohaku at the village. When Kagome returns home to the present day, she notices that her family is away on a trip, and Yuka and Eri are absent. Inuyasha visits her, advising her to stay at home, and he believes her spiritual powers and abilities were sealed by Kikyo's final wish not to fight anymore. Kagome wants to keep her promise to Kikyo, and to make a correct wish over the Shikon Jewel. Before Inuyasha can kiss Kagome, they are interrupted by the sudden return of her family. Ten days later, Kagome goes on her way by train to take her entrance exams, but is persistently followed by Inuyasha. Kagome's bag gets caught in the train when exiting, but Inuyasha carries her after the train to retrieve her bag. Inuyasha takes her to the exam site, where her mother meets her with the exam ticket she somehow left at home.
186	19	"Kohaku's Shard"; Transliteration: "Kōhaku no Kakera" (Japanese: 琥珀の欠片)	Atsushi Yano, Hiroki Negishi	Masashi Kojima	February 9, 2010	February 8, 2013
Sesshomaru finds the illusion created by Byakuya. Magatsuhi possesses Kohaku. Before escaping, despite Miroku's attempt to suck the spirit with the Wind Tunnel, Magatsuhi injures Miroku and Sango while knocking Rin out. Inuyasha and Kagome return and give chase, while Sesshomaru discovers the deception and is distracted by thousands of demons. Back at the village, Sango kisses Miroku and prays for him to survive, before following Kohaku. When Inuyasha, Kagome, and Sango find him, Magatsuhi reveals that Kohaku is reliving the events of killing his family. But responding to Sango's appeal with the aid of what little of Kikyo's pure light remains in the jewel shard, Kohaku jumps into a canyon and forces Magatsuhi to leave him.
187	20	"When the Jewel Is Whole"; Transliteration: "Shikon no Tama ga Kansei suru Toki" (Japanese: 四魂の玉が完成する時)	Takeshi Furuta	Kenji Kodama	February 16, 2010	February 15, 2013
Kohaku forces Magatsuhi to retreat and Sesshomaru destroys Naraku's appendages. Naraku threatens Kagome, forcing Inuyasha's group to surrender the last jewel shard. Discreetly spotting a sacred arrow on the ground before offering himself to Naraku, Kohaku stabs him in the right shoulder, shattering the turtle shelled armor previously absorb by Moryomaru and forcing Naraku to retreat. Meanwhile, as the Wind Tunnel is close to consuming Miroku, a fragment of Magatsuhi possesses Rin's body to fly off with a demon. After Kohaku reunites with the others, a piece of Naraku's flesh pierces Kohaku's neck and takes the last jewel shard, leaving his empty body behind. Luckily, Kohaku is revived by Kikyo's light after her spirit hears Sango crying for him. After Naraku completes the Shikon Jewel, the final battle between light and darkness begins.
188	21	"Inside Naraku"; Transliteration: "Naraku no Tainai e" (Japanese: 奈落の体内へ)	Satoshi Toba	Mitsuko Kase	February 23, 2010	February 22, 2013
Kagome learns that she has been put on the waiting list for high school, finally graduating from school with her friends. Hojo wishes to give Kagome his second button, a tradition in Japan meaning that the boy likes the girl, but she leaves before he can. Meanwhile, Naraku fuses the power of the Shikon Jewel and reveals his final form as a giant spider. Inuyasha's group leave the village for Naraku. As they find Naraku and Byakuya in a cloud of miasma, they see Sesshomaru entering Naraku's body for Rin. As Inuyasha's group enters, Miroku pauses to propose to Sango. They soon realize that though they are breathing in the miasma, it is not harming them because the Shikon Jewel wants to capture their souls first. Inuyasha and Kagome search for the defiled jewel, after Miroku and Sango are captured. As Inuyasha gets near the Shikon Jewel, he turns into a full-blooded demon and attacks Kagome. Naraku offers Kagome a miasma-coated arrow to save herself with, but she refuses. Naraku says Inuyasha will kill Kagome. Inuyasha inadvertently sends her off a cliff.
189	22	"Naraku: The Trap of Darkness"; Transliteration: "Naraku: Yami no Wana" (Japanese: 奈落 闇の罠)	Teruo Sato	Masato Sato	March 2, 2010	March 1, 2013
Miroku and Sango are shown an illusion of Miroku's father being sucked in by his own Wind Tunnel. Inuyasha momentarily regains his humanity when he hears Kagome's voice, but diverts back to his demon form when his heart is devoured by the Shikon Jewel's poison. After Miroku uses his Wind Tunnel to save Sango from oncoming demons, he recommends that he should part ways with her. Rin regains her consciousness and discovers Inuyasha possessed by Magatsuhi. When Sesshomaru and Kagome arrive, the former fights with Inuyasha, while the latter attempts to retrieve Tetsusaiga, which Magatsuhi tossed aside due to its connection to Inuyasha's senses. As Kagome pulls the sword, she falls over the cliff, she holds onto the side. Inuyasha regains control of his body after smelling Kagome's blood and when Tetsusaiga is returned to him. Magatsuhi tries to possess Kagome, but Inuyasha draws out the demonic energy and Sesshomaru uses Tenseiga to dispel and kill Magatsuhi.
190	23	"Naraku: The Trap of Light"; Transliteration: "Naraku: Hikari no Wana" (Japanese: 奈落 光の罠)	Satoshi Toba	Kenji Kodama	March 9, 2010	March 8, 2013
Kagome's innate spiritual powers and abilities are released to their fullest extent with the Shikon Jewel having a spark of pure light within it. Naraku tries to eradicate the pure light by sending out illusions: one to trick Miroku into using the Wind Tunnel for the last time, and another to make Sango kill Rin. Inuyasha makes it in time to prevent Miroku from opening the Wind Tunnel. Kagome's sacred arrow hits Naraku, destroying the illusions and freeing Rin with the Hiraikotsu. Though Rin is freed, Kohaku saves her. Inuyasha, Kagome, and Miroku see Naraku's true body as his miasma starts to fill the air. As Inuyasha sends a Meido Zangetsuha traveling past Naraku, Shippo later sees Byakuya intercepting it with a strange blade to rob some of this dark orb's energy. Sango protects an awakened Rin from the miasma by giving her the mask.
191	24	"Naraku's Uncertain Wish"; Transliteration: "Naraku: Hakanaki Nozomi" (Japanese: 奈落 儚き望み)	Takeshi Furuta	Hitoyuki Matsui	March 16, 2010	March 15, 2013
Naraku releases more miasma, while Inuyasha uses Tetsusaiga's barrier to save himself, Kagome, and Miroku. Sango arrives riding Kirara and throws her Hirakotsu, but it absorbs the miasma and Sango falls through a hole that Naraku opens in his flesh. Miroku follows and reunites with her. Elsewhere, Sesshomaru, having recovered Rin, strikes Naraku's outer body with Bakusaiga. The effects of the blade's destruction begin to spread rapidly. When Kagome questions Naraku about whether his real wish has come true, he becomes enraged. As he absorbs the Shikon Jewel, he begins transforming and spreading spiderwebs around the area. Inuyasha unleashes Meido Zangestuha, which takes on the form of slashing blades due to the different nature of his sword. Miroku and Sango fall again, but are joined by Shippo. Byakuya slashes Kagome behind her, but it leaves no wound. Inuyasha quickly attacks and kills Byakuya, who states that he has fulfilled his purpose. Miroku, Sango, Shippo, Kirara, and Sesshomaru, join Inuyasha and Kagome in the final battle.
192	25	"Thoughts Fall Short"; Transliteration: "Todokanu Omoi" (Japanese: 届かぬ想い)	Takahiko Kyōgoku	Mitsuko Kase	March 23, 2010	March 22, 2013
Naraku transforms after finally feeding his soul to the Shikon Jewel, vastly spreading miasma in the area. As the group exits the large mass of misama, they find themselves over the Bone Eater's Well near Kaede's village. After Naraku's body is destroyed forever by Inuyasha's Meido Zangetsuha and Sesshomaru's Bakusaiga, Kagome pierces the Shikon Jewel with an unusually powerful sacred arrow, dealing his soul a fatal blow. It is learned that Naraku's true wish was Kikyo's heart, a wish that the Shikon Jewel never granted. Miroku's Wind Tunnel vanishes after Naraku's soul has been purified from the material world, but a Meido suddenly opens behind Kagome (created due to Byakuya striking her earlier) and pulls her in along with the well. Kagome finds herself having a normal life without memories of Inuyasha or the others. However, she is bothered by the illusion. When she touches the Sacred Tree, her memories return and the spell is broken, but she is trapped by the darkness. The voice of the Shikon Jewel tells her that she will forever remain there, unless she makes a wish to return to her own time. Meanwhile, Inuyasha uses Meido Zangestuha to jump into the darkness after Kagome. As Inuyasha battles through the demons, he tells Kagome not to make a wish, since doing so would bound her inside the Shikon Jewel, battling demons for eternity.
193	26	"Toward Tomorrow"; Transliteration: "Ashita e" (Japanese: 明日へ)	Teruo Sato	Yasunao Aoki	March 30, 2010	March 29, 2013
Inuyasha manages to reach Kagome, who remembers her grandfather about the jewel. As Inuyasha reaches Kagome and share a kiss, she makes a wish for the Shikon Jewel to disappear from the real world. Three years later, Kagome has graduated from high school and recalls how she and Inuyasha returned to the present. The well transported Inuyasha back to his time and stopped working since then. In the present day, Kagome returns to the well and realizes her feelings were what was blocking the well. When she wishes to see him again, the well reactivates and she bids farewell to her mother. Inuyasha finds Kagome from the well and they embrace. Kagome's family and friends continue to live as they always have: Sota tells his friends about his sister's absence, Kagome's friends are in college, and Hojo is dating an underclasswoman. Shippo trains to become a strong fox demon, Sango and Miroku have three children, Kohaku leaves to become a strong demon slayer, Myoga lives with Totosai, Koga marries the wolf demon girl Ayame, Rin lives with Kaede in the village, and Sesshomaru and Jaken pay their visits. Inuyasha said that this was practice for returning her to a human village or whatever she chooses. Kagome is contently adapting to her new life in the feudal world as Inuyasha's wife.
