= Urusei Yatsura 2: Beautiful Dreamer =

1984 Japanese animated film

- Theatrical release poster

Japanese name
- Kanji: うる星やつら2 ビューティフル・ドリーマー
Transcriptions
- Revised Hepburn: Urusei Yatsura 2 Byūtifuru Dorīmā
- Directed by: Mamoru Oshii
- Screenplay by: Mamoru Oshii
- Based on: Urusei Yatsura by Rumiko Takahashi
- Produced by: Hidenori Taga
- Music by: Masaru Hoshi
- Production companies: Kitty Films; Toho; Studio Pierrot
- Distributed by: Toho
- Release date: February 11, 1984 (Japan)
- Running time: 98 minutes
- Country: Japan
- Language: Japanese

Urusei Yatsura 2: Beautiful Dreamer (Note: うる星やつら2 ビューティフル・ドリーマー, Urusei Yatsura 2 Byūtifuru Dorīmā) is a 1984 Japanese animated fantasy comedy film produced by Kitty Films and distributed by Toho. It is the second film in the Urusei Yatsura film series based on the manga of the same name by Rumiko Takahashi. In the film, a group of Japanese high school students including Lum and Ataru prepare for the annual school cultural festival and begin to question the reality around them after a series of perplexing events. The film experimented with concepts such as a time loop, dreams, and simulated reality, in departure from the previous film Only You which was more faithful to Takahashi's original manga and anime series.

The film was written and directed by Mamoru Oshii with Yuji Moriyama as animation director. Its predecessor, Only You, was also directed by Oshii. Beautiful Dreamer was a significant departure, with Oshii placing an emphasis on philosophical issues.

Although the film received mixed responses upon its initial release, Beautiful Dreamer later received critical acclaim as an early example of Oshii's style of filmmaking. The film was ranked among the best Japanese animated films of all time, including by film magazine Kinema Junpo. The film has drawn comparisons to later works including Oshii's directed Ghost in the Shell (1995), Groundhog Day (1993), Dark City (1998), and Inception (2010).

== Plot ==
Ataru and Lum are among the students at Tomobiki high school involved in preparing for the upcoming student cultural festival. Some of them grow suspicious that their days have been repeating. To validate the theory, they are all sent home, instead of sleeping overnight like they had been. All the students end up back at the school, unable to leave the city limits. They board a Harrier jump jet and fly upwards into space. They see that their entire city is on the back of a giant turtle, in the otherwise empty void of space. The students investigate the school, believing it to be the source of the strange happenings. Seemingly impossible events transpire, like Ataru chased by his own reflections in an infinity mirror.

Reality quickly shifts. While before, everything seemed normal, the city now is abandoned with buildings decaying as if it was a post-apocalyptic setting. Only a handful of humans are present, working electricity is rare, and many buildings have worn into ruins. However, Ataru's parents house functions normally with access to electricity and gas with the local corner store giving access to food. Members of the group trick a dream demon into revealing himself. He describes his plan to create an endless dream, free of another spirit who tends to devour his dreams when they become nightmares. Ataru summons the nightmare eater as his dream harem does not include his beloved Lum. The nightmare eater is summoned and the reality of the dreamscape collapses as he eats the dream. Ataru continues waking up in successive nightmares. Lum tells him that to wake up, he must speak the name of the person he wants to see. After naming several other women, he names Lum and wakes up in the school. Surrounded by his classmates, he and Lum briefly discuss the dream she had. Lum asks to kiss, but Ataru is embarrassed. Unknown to the others, the dream demon and dream eater are shown working on the school festival. The demon implies he will "keep up" with Lum and Ataru.

== Cast ==
Character	Japanese voice	English voice
Ataru Moroboshi	Toshio Furukawa	Vinnie Penna
Lum	Fumi Hirano	Ann Ulrey
Shutaro Mendou	Akira Kamiya	Vinnie Penna
Ten	Kazuko Sugiyama	Paula Parker
Shinobu Miyake	Saeko Shimazu	Jeannette Ann Wallace
Sakura	Machiko Washio	Marnie Head
Ryuunosuke Fujinami	Mayumi Tanaka	Kimberli Wayman
Megane	Shigeru Chiba	Craig Wollman
Perm	Akira Murayama	Michael Walters
Kakugari	Shinji Nomura	Edward Morrisson Garland
Chibi	Issei Futamata	Matthew Ross
Ataru's Father	Kenichi Ogata	Larry Robinson
Ataru's Mother	Natsumi Sakuma	Jackie Tantillo
Onsen-Mark	Michihiro Ikemizu	T. Roy Barnes
Ryuunosuke's Father	Masahiro Anzai	
Principal	Tomomichi Nishimura	Draidyl Roberts
Cherry	Ichirō Nagai	Larry Robinson
Mujaki	Takuya Fujioka	Draidyl Roberts

== Production ==
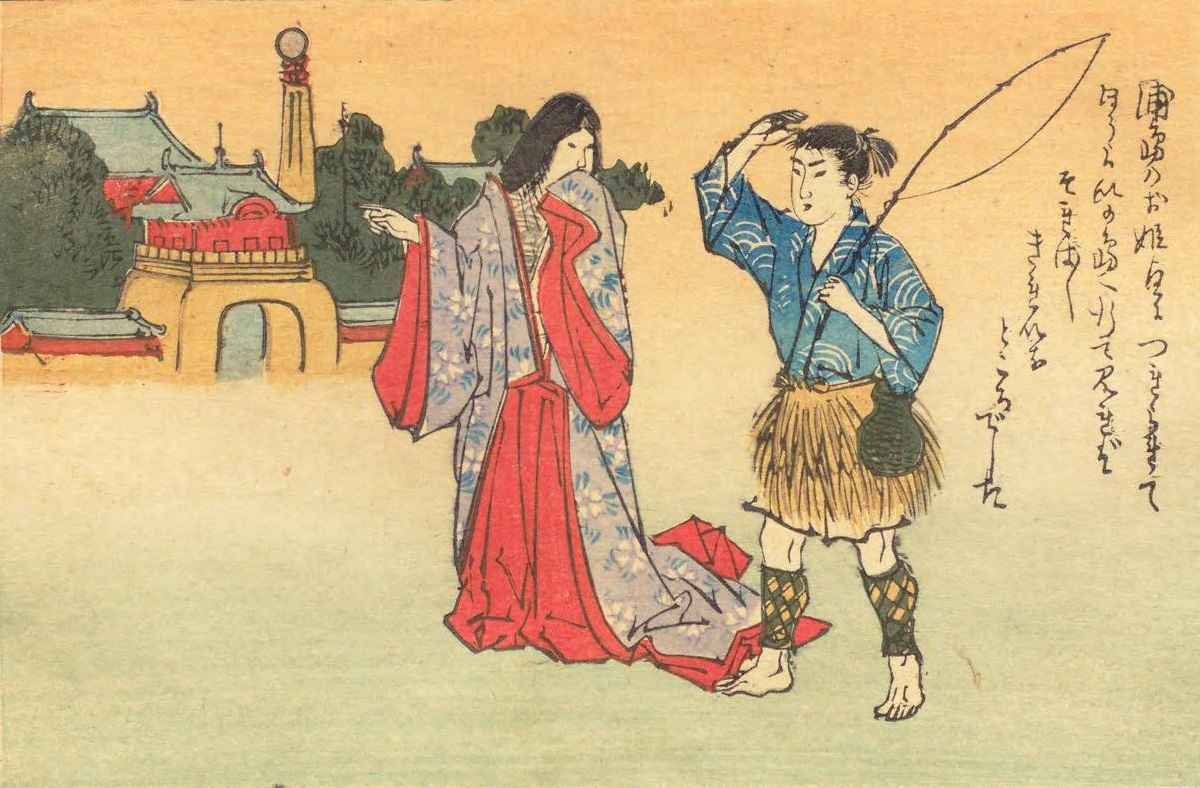
Beautiful Dreamer borrows heavily from the Japanese fairy tale of Urashima Tarō.

Like its predecessor, Only You, Beautiful Dreamer borrows heavily from the Japanese fairy tale of Urashima Tarō. Whereas the previous film was written by Tomoko Konparu, Beautiful Dreamer was written by Oshii with no consultation from Rumiko Takahashi. Writer/director Mamoru Oshii, who was unsatisfied with how the first film had developed, rejected the idea of catering to audience expectations and decided to do the film his own way. This almost caused Takahashi to reject the script because it deviated so far from the original story. In an interview with Kinema Junpo in 2008, Oshii said that he felt joy making the film because, at that time, he finally "understood how to make a film". In the 2002 Japanese DVD commentary for Beautiful Dreamer, Oshii gave some more insight regarding his involvement with the film. According to the commentary, Oshii some of the film's design were inspired by M. C. Escher and that he wanted to create a story "from the viewpoint of a man" as opposed to Takahashi's "by the hands of women" work. Animator Yuji Moriyama worked as overall animation director, worked on key animation, as well as mechanical designs for the film after previously having worked on the television series.

== Release ==
Beautiful Dreamer was released theatrically in Japan on February 11, 1984, during the second season of the series where it was distributed by Toho.

Central Park Media released the film on VHS in North America on November 1, 1992, and on DVD on June 8, 2004. The DVD contained a "full-length" directors' commentary by Mamoru Oshii as well as an art gallery. Beautiful Dreamer is also the only Urusei Yatsura film released in the United States by US Manga Corps and not AnimEigo, though AnimEigo is credited with doing the translation and subtitling of the film on the VHS release, as well as designing the DVD packaging to match the other movies in the series. The movie aired on the Sci-Fi Channel's anime lineup in the U.S. in the late 1990s. In 2016, Discotek Media announced they had licensed the film in North America and will release it on DVD and Blu-ray. It was released on February 27, 2018. During a Panel at Otakon 2022, Discotek revealed that they licensed Beautiful Dreamer just to "test the waters" on Urusei Yatsura. Discotek would later release the rest of the films on Blu-Ray, as well as the entire anime series. As of 2025, the Blu-Ray is out of print.

In Japan, the DVD of the film was released in 2002, featuring both the original mono soundtrack as well as an all-new 5.1 surround audio track, both in Japanese, as well as audio commentaries by Mamoru Oshii, associate director Junji Nishimura, and Shigeru Chiba. A Japanese Blu-ray was planned for release in March 2009 before being cancelled. The Blu-ray was eventually released on January 21, 2015, ranking in third place on the weekly Oricon charts during its release week, with 7,860 copies sold. The Blu-ray lacks the audio commentaries featured in the original DVD release.

== Reception ==
=== Critical response ===
==== Contemporary reviews ====
Upon its initial release, the film received mixed responses, generally from the fan community. Criticism was especially given towards Oshii, with several fans sending him letters containing razor blades. In Stray Dog of Anime: The Films of Mamoru Oshii, Brian Ruh noted that the film "angered a number of viewers" as it placed "emphasis more on deeper philosophical issues" instead of the more comedic tone of the series. In an interview with Richard Eisenbeis in 2017, Oshii recalled fan criticism on the film's deemphasis of its series characters, especially of Lum.

==== Later reception ====
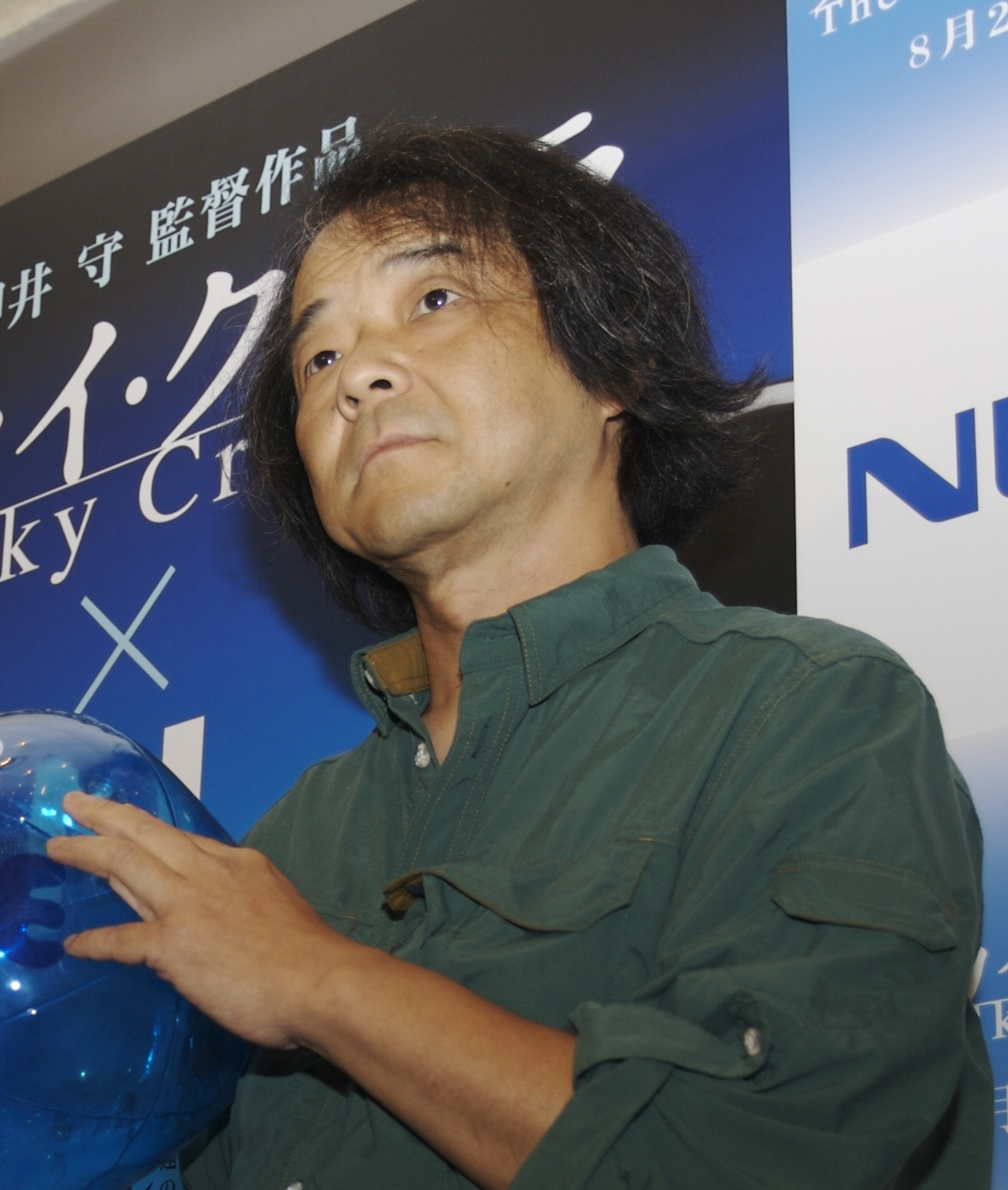
Director Mamoru Oshii in 2008

In subsequent reviews of the film, critics considered Beautiful Dreamer to be an early example of Oshii's well-received style of filmmaking. Brian Ruh noted that the film contained an "unmistakable visual style, using quiet, contemplative shots, often coupled with long monologues or dialogues" and that the film featured imagery that would be seen in Oshii's later films such as water and tanks. Vincent Ostria stated in Les Inrockuptibles that the film is "a series of dreams in abyss, foretelling...the virtual games of Avalon and Ghost in the Shell". Todd French of Cinefantastique called the film a "must-see", comparing the work to Alain Resnais' "existentialist time-space displacement flicks" and the Agatha Christie novel And Then There Were None. Meanwhile, John Hartl of The Seattle Times compared the film's use of a time loop to the later 1993 film Groundhog Day. Aaron Gerow of The Daily Yomiuri referred to Beautiful Dreamer as a critique to "both the repetitive world of anime and the otaku fans who lock themselves up in that universe." Jeff Yang of SFGate compared the film to Oshii's next film, Angel's Egg, claiming that both of the films question "whether what we think is 'real' is real and whether we're really 'thinking' at all -- or whether we're just the products of someone else's fantasy."

On mania.com Chris Beveridge called the film "a great anime classic". In Otaku USA, Daryl Surat said the film "is commonly hailed as one of the single best anime films of all time". THEM Anime Reviews gave the film 4 stars and called it "a skilled surrealist Oshii Mamoru piece with lots of mystery and just enough Urusei Yatsura wackiness to remain familiar." Olivier Bitoun on TVClassik gave the film 3 stars. Fred Patten of Animation World Network stated that the film was an excellent movie, but also stated that it was not a good representative sample of the series. In "The Anime Movie Guide", Helen McCarthy gave the film three stars out of five, writing "Oshii uses the story [of Urashima Tarō] as a basis of a comedy that plays with serious issues like time, space, reality and perception.

=== Accolades ===
Kinema Junpo ranked Beautiful Dreamer as the 17th best Japanese film of 1984. That same publication later ranked it as one of the best Japanese animated movies. The film was the runner-up for the "Best 10" films in the 6th Yokohama Film Festival. In the 1984 edition of the Anime Grand Prix, the film was ranked third place. The film was ranked number 38 on a list of the Top 100 anime by Animage magazine. It was also number 9 on a list by Wizard's Anime Magazine of the Top 50 anime released in North America. In February 2004, Cinefantastique listed the film as one of the "10 Essential Animations" of Japan alongside Oshii's Ghost in the Shell. The film was named 7th Greatest Japanese Animated Film of All Time by Japanese film magazine Kinema Junpo in 2009. In 2017, Paste listed the film as number 28 on their "Top 100 Best Anime Movies of All Time" list.

== Legacy ==
Vincent Ostria stated in Les Inrockuptibles that the film is "a series of dreams in abyss, foretelling...the virtual games of Avalon and Ghost in the Shell". John Hartl of The Seattle Times compared the film's use of a time loop plot device to the later 1993 film Groundhog Day. The scholar Benedict Marko compared it to the 1998 film Dark City, which he believes to have been influenced by Urusei Yatsura 2. Josh Zyber of Hi-Def Digest said it "was a clear influence on both Groundhog Day and Dark City". The writers Brian Camp and Davis Julie have also compared it to Groundhog Day. Steve Heisler of The A.V. Club compared it to the 2010 film Inception.

Manga UK traces the roots of time loop anime and manga to Beautiful Dreamer. The time loop device has since appeared in numerous Japanese anime, manga, and light novels, such as the 1987 anime series Kimagure Orange Road in the Christmas episode ("Kyosuke Timetrips! The Third Christmas"), the "Endless Eight" arc of the Haruhi Suzumiya light novels (2004) and anime series (2009), and the light novel All You Need is Kill (2004) which was adapted into the Hollywood film Edge of Tomorrow (2014).

== See also ==
- List of films featuring time loops
