= Magical girlfriend =

Stock character often associated with romantic comedy anime and manga series

A magical girlfriend, exotic girlfriend, monster girlfriend, nonhuman woman, or supernatural lover, is a female stock character often associated with romantic comedy anime and manga series, and is sometimes considered a genre of its own, or as the leading lady of the "fantastic romance" genre, which combines the fantasy and romance genres.

As Thomas Lamarre states, "Anime fans become familiar with a whole range of female figures that are either not really human (robots, aliens, deities, animals), or that possess extra-human powers of some kind or another (from cyborg enhancements to magical or psychic abilities), which take them beyond the merely human woman."

Magical girlfriends can be one or many in a single series (always attached to the male lead). Because of the tendency for rivals to appear even when there is one female lead and because of the unnatural gender balance among the cast, magical girlfriend comedies are often conflated with harem comedies. A good example of this conflation is Oh My Goddess! which is "one of the prototypical 'harem' titles" despite the short-lived nature of most of the romantic rivalries.

== History ==
Magical girlfriends initially derived from the US television series Bewitched and I Dream of Jeannie, which were dubbed for the Japanese market. Sally the Witch was the first anime series inspired by Bewitched, leading to the popularity of magical girls in Japanese anime.

== Genre characteristics ==
Often series in the genre start with the male lead encountering the female lead either by pure chance or by an unusual event, after which the female lead somehow becomes bound or otherwise dependent upon him, often forcing a situation of cohabitation. In many cases, this situation is repeated with other characters (Tenchi Muyo!), overlapping with the harem genre. However, the male lead is often inexperienced with women despite typically being a "nice guy". This situation often prevents the relationship from advancing beyond a platonic level throughout most of the series, as an ideal girlfriend doesn't come on strong herself and is generally passive in the relationship.

In parodies, the character may be "too young" (i.e. Nakahito Kagura in Steel Angel Kurumi; Negi Springfield in Negima! Magister Negi Magi) or otherwise have a more rational, ambivalent attitude towards women. A famous early reversal of the cliche occurs with the overtly lecherous Ataru Moroboshi of Urusei Yatsura, who is simply uninterested in monogamous relationships despite the fact few women besides his romantically aggressive alien girlfriend find him attractive.

Another feature is that soon after the male and female leads begin to live together, other (usually female) characters from the female (or male) lead's origin appear (friends, siblings, relatives, rivals or even enemies), either becoming frequent visitors, cohabitors, or generally causing a disruption, or even moving in with the lead couple. Sometimes a character from the male lead's origin will appear. Examples include Ai Yori Aoshi, where Kaoru's half-brother tries to take Aoi for himself, and Omamori Himari, where demonslayer Kuesu Jinguuji appears in volume 3 to claim Yuuto Amakawa as her betrothed.

Even when there is one female lead, various rivals always threaten the relationship between the lead characters, often creating complicated "love polygons". These can vary from being from mundane characters such as men who fight for the affection of the female (and rarely male) lead, or rivals from the female lead's origins.

The romantic relationship(s) in magical girlfriend comedies tend to remain static and platonic throughout the series. Commonly episodes involve some sort of superficial threat to the static nature of the relationship (which could be, and often is, the male lead or the girlfriend's desire to get closer), which is almost always resolved in some way that doesn't fundamentally alter that relationship. Action plotlines are often introduced through some sort of threat from the magical girlfriend's origins or through other means. If the romantic relationship(s) do move, it is very slow.

As stated by Annalee Newitz in 1995, Video Girl Ai, Urusei Yatsura, Tenchi Muyo!, and Oh My Goddess!, magical girlfriends are akin to American television shows such as Bewitched and I Dream of Jeannie as they portray women who are exceptionally powerful as well as traditionally feminine. Newitz again proposes that magical girl romantic comedies are the culmination between worlds of fantasy and reality. For example, in Oh My Goddess! Belldandy is a goddess who is accidentally summoned by college student Keiichi. Similarly, Newitz alleges that the idea that women "should conceal their power" is a common trope. This is because magical girls in the aforementioned shows almost exclusively use their powers in the home or in their private relationship, but not for power at work or influence outside the domestic realm.

== The "ideal woman" personality, or yamato nadeshiko ==
Many magical girlfriends are considered by both fans and critics of the genre to be idealizations of woman-kind. This model of the ideal Japanese woman, the yamato nadeshiko, is similar to that found in The Tale of Genji. Ideal girlfriends are not necessarily magical in nature. Some "ideal" magical girlfriends may seem weak and emotionally needy, while others may possess a godly power stemming from their feminine traits.

Ideal women have absolute dedication to whatever work they do and for whomever they have great affection, although depending on the character's actual talents this can make for anything from 'quite capable' to 'well-meaning klutz'. They usually have calm, gentle and demure personalities. They generally suppress selfish desires in favor of desiring good for others.

Ideal women are always naive or innocent, sometimes explained by the girlfriend's origins which do not allow for many experiences with mainstream life. Paradoxically, other characters of the girlfriend's origin tend not to be as naive (e.g. Belldandy of Oh My Goddess! is more naive than even her kid sister). Ideal women are emotionally insightful, seeing the good in others when most wouldn't and forgiving their shortcomings.

Ideal women are examples of moe girls in manga and anime. As such, ideal girlfriends are not overly independent. They are proper Japanese women who typically will not initiate romantic action themselves, except in a delicate or indirect manner. However, numerous characters are so innocent as to not understand the nature of their actions. Independence and aggression (especially in sexual matters) is a trait of parodies of the ideal girlfriend such as Lum in Urusei Yatsura, Kurumi in Steel Angel Kurumi or Hazuki in Tsukuyomi -Moon Phase-.

Parodies of the ideal woman are often selfish and become involved with the male lead because of their own selfish desires which are not (initially) shared by their mate. While the male lead usually has some sort of hold over his girlfriend (as "husband," "fiancé," provider, contract holder, client, creator, master, or even owner) the parody of the ideal girlfriend either succeeds in inverting the power balance of relationship or simply reverses roles.

Shōjo artists have written another sort of parody of magical girlfriends. Shōjo writers put more emphasis on the girl. Examples include Absolute Boyfriend, in which an ordinary girl gets a magical boyfriend, and Ultra Maniac, in which a Middle School girl meets and becomes best friends with a magical girlfriend; followed by their misadventures at finding boyfriends.

Susan J. Napier has described the popularity of the ideal magical girlfriend, for example, Belldandy and Ai to be a backlash against the "yellow cab" social phenomenon, where some Japanese women were seeking out sexual relationships with non-Japanese men.

== Examples of "magical girlfriend" characters ==
- Belldandy of Oh My Goddess!
- Lum of Urusei Yatsura (a parody of the ideal girlfriend)
- Lala Satalin Deviluke of To Love Ru
- Chi of Chobits
- Saati Namba of A.I. Love You
- Haruko of FLCL
- Shaorin of Mamotte Shugogetten
- Night of Absolute Boyfriend (male equivalent of magical girlfriend)
- Sun Seto of My Bride Is a Mermaid
- Valkyrie of UFO Ultramaiden Valkyrie
- Phryne of Fractale

== In Western media ==
Tiffany White of Pop Matters, in her review of the Mannequin movies, classifies magical girlfriend movies with this template:

- Main protagonist is a loser who has no luck with girls or has a real girlfriend who doesn't understand him.
- Main guy finds a magical girlfriend (usually an angel, mermaid, or science experiment) and they fall in love.
- An antagonist lurks about, and its sole purpose is exposing the magical girlfriend.
- In the end, the protagonist and the magical girlfriend escape persecution, gain public acceptance, and spend the rest of their lives happy ever after.

A.E. Sparrow of IGN, in reviewing Mamotte Shugogetten, also relates magical girlfriends shows to their western counterparts:

"She's completely devoted to protecting her new "master" from any misfortune, utterly oblivious to the ways of the modern world, and (in cute girl manga terms) a total knockout. If you're not completely immersed in the world of manga yet, think "I Dream of Jeannie". If you are, then think "Oh! My Goddess!". Either one works if you're looking for a comparison."

Examples of magical girlfriend in Western media include: Lisa from Weird Science, "Angel" in Date with an Angel, and Madison from Splash. For science fiction, girlfriends can also be labelled as "algorithm-defined fantasy girl" and range from robots such as Ava in Ex Machina to artificial intelligence systems such as Samantha in Her and Joi in Blade Runner 2049.

== See also ==
- Manic pixie dream girl
- Gynoid
- Paranormal romance
