= Urusei Yatsura: Stay With You =

- Developer: Hudson Soft
- Series: Urusei Yatsura
- Platform: PC Engine CD-ROM²
- Release: JP: June 29, 1990
- Genre: Adventure
- Mode: Single-player

Urusei Yatsura: Stay With You (Note: Japanese: うる星やつら Stay With You) is a 1990 video game made for the PC Engine's compact disc hardware, the CD-ROM². The game is based on the Urusei Yatsura anime franchise, which included manga, a television and film series. The game features the voice cast from the 1980s television series.

Urusei Yatsura: Stay With You was promoted as a "digital comic" by Hudson Soft. Japanese video game journalists of the period said that while promoted this way, it still featured gameplay such as 15 puzzles. On its release in Japan on June 29, 1990, PC Engine Fan listed the game as the top-selling game for the PC Engine that week. It received positive reviews from critics in the Japanese magazines Famicom Tsūshin, Gekkan PC Engine and Famicom Hisshoubon, with critics complimenting its graphics and how it felt more like watching an anime than playing an adventure game.

== Background and plot ==
Urusei Yatsura: Stay With You is an original story based on the Urusei Yatsura franchise. The franchise started as a manga series published in 1978 in Weekly Shōnen Sunday. The manga was the first hit by artist Rumiko Takahashi. It was adapted into the Urusei Yatsura animated television series, which ran from October 1981 to March 1986. In both the manga, anime series, and film series, the stories involve the events of an alien princess named Lum who falls in love with the high school student Ataru Moroboshi after a game of tag in which the fate of the world hangs in the balance. Ataru spends most of his time chasing after other girls or running away from Lum.

In Urusei Yatsura: Stay With You, Ataru and Lum are at their high school, where they discover that Shinobu, Ataru's ex-girlfriend and classmate, has gone missing. As the search for Shinobu continues, further incidents occur, which have the two explore beyond their school to their town and eventually outer space.

== Gameplay ==
Gameplay in Stay With You features graphics of the scene, text descriptions of what is happening of the scene, and menu options split into three windows.

In Urusei Yatsura: Stay With You was described by Famitsu as an adventure game. Regular gameplay features the screen split into three windows. The commands the player can select appear on the right side of the screen. The user selects the appropriate commands from a menu to further the story. Commands offered are prompts like "Take" and "Talk", followed by asking the user what noun in the scene they should do this action with. Other commands allow for traversal to different areas to further explore. A screen on the left side shows the current situation through graphics, while a dialogue at the top displays text that is the response to the user's choices from the menu. Different menu options open up as the game progresses with the possibility of chooing decisions that lead to the premature end of the game appearing in later stages of the game.

While promoted this way, the release features other gameplay such as the inclusion of 15 puzzles. Some segments are in a 3D point of view. In these parts, the user can move the character in a first-person perspective and rotate their point of view around the room.

== Development ==
Between 1989 and 1992, very few Japanese adventure games were distributed outside a few mystery-themed releases or games featuring manga and anime characters. While described by gaming publications as an adventure game, a developer of Urusei Yatsura: Stay With You spoke about the release in Gekkan PC Engine saying that they felt the game was not an adventure game, but a digital comic. A reviewer in same publication said the game was made in a similar style to Hudson Soft's earlier game based on an anime, Cobra: Kokuryū Ō no Densetsu (1989).

The voice actors from the television series returned to voice their respective characters in the game.

== Release ==
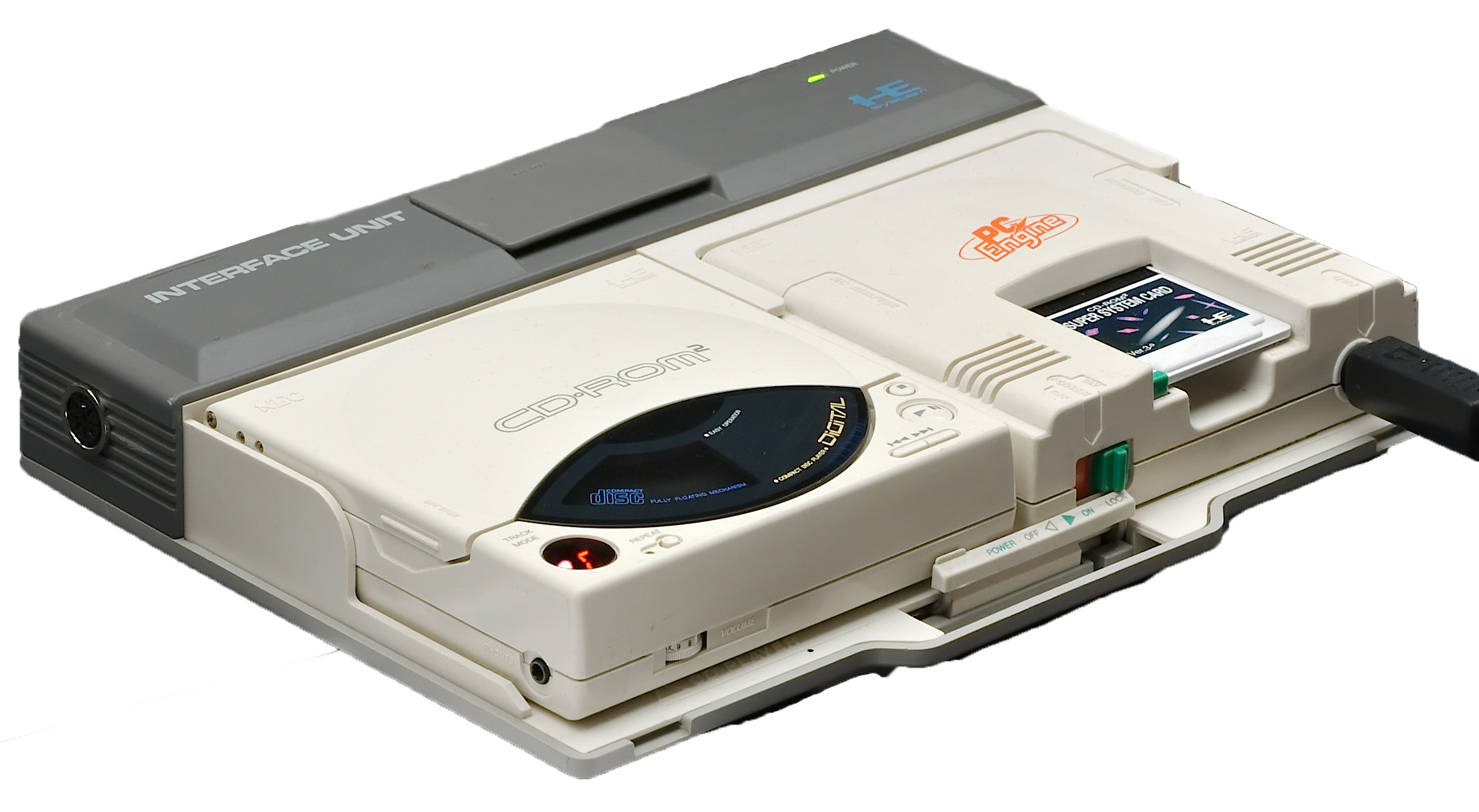
Urusei Yatsura: Stay With You was released for the PC Engine's CD add-on, the CD-ROM².

Urusei Yatsura: Stay With You was released in Japan for the PC Engine CD-ROM² on June 29, 1990.

In their poll of various department store and toy shop sales, from June 4th to July 1st, PC Engine Fan said that Urusei Yatsura: Stay With You was the top-selling PC Engine game in Osaka and Saitama. They had the game ranked as the best-selling PC Engine game during the week of June 25 and July 1. The publication said the sales were "phenomenal", with many stores in Japan selling out of copies of the game on their first day. The game dropped to sixth in the magazine's weekly chart the following week before vanishing from the top ten for the remaining month.

== Reception ==
Reception

Review scores
Publication	Score
Famitsu	7/10, 7/10, 9/10, 7/10
Gekkan PC Engine	80/100, 85/100, 85/100, 85/100, 90/100
Marukatsu PC Engine	8/10, 7/10, 8/10, 7/10

Some reviewers in Famicom Tsūshin and Gekkan PC Engine described the game as more like watching an anime series than playing a video game, with one reviewer of the former publication attributed to the lack of any difficult puzzles. A number of reviewers in these publications complimented the lack of difficulty, saying there were no sneaky puzzles like to continuously use one command several times to progress. A reviewer in Famicom Hisshoubon cautioned fans of adventure games as they said the release was more focused on appealing to fans of the original work than video games audiences, while some reviewers in Famicom Tsūshin said it would be good entry game for newcomers to the genre.

One reviewer in Gekkan PC Engine commented that while the story had great pacing, the voice audio having to load each time which effected the flow of the game. Another from the same publication said the loading times were so fast that players will notice the delay. One reviewer in Marukatsu PC Engine and two in Famicom Tsūshin complimented the graphics, with a reviewer from the latter magazine saying that most adventure games had one or two picture per scene, this game featured about ten and that their recommendation for the game was mostly due to its high production values. A reviewer in Famicom Hisshoubon complimented Hudson Soft's "digital comic"-approach as the perfect way to convey the charm of Urusei Yatsura, while a Gekkan PC Engine reviewer said it got them excited for the idea of the future digital publications.

Three of the four reviewers in Famicom Tsūshin as being among their top recommendations of the week, with them definitely recommending it to fans while saying non-fans would also be able to get enjoyment from it.

== See also ==
- List of TurboGrafx-16 games
- List of video games based on anime or manga
