= Momoko 120% =

1986 video game

- Arcade flyer
- Developer: Jaleco
- Publisher: Jaleco
- Platforms: Arcade, Family Computer, mobile phone
- Release: Arcade: JP: August 1986; Family Computer: JP: October 23, 1986; Mobile: JP: February 28, 2006
- Genre: Platform
- Modes: Single-player, multiplayer

Momoko 120% (モモコ120%, Momoko Hyakunijū Pāsento) is a 1986 platform game developed and published by Jaleco for arcades. The game was originally intended to be an Urusei Yatsura game, but for an unknown reason the license was not obtained for the arcade version; while the characters were changed, "Lum's Love Song", the first opening theme of the first anime adaptation, still loops throughout the game. The Family Computer port retained the license and was titled Urusei Yatsura: Lum's Wedding Bell. The game was re-released for mobile phones in Japan on February 28, 2006. Three mobile phone sequels, Momoko 1200%, Momoko 1200% in Machigai Sagashi and Momoko no Kasei Bowling ~La Mars Cup~, were released in Japan only in 2006.

== Gameplay ==
This platform game features Momoko, a young Japanese girl who ages by several years each time the player reaches the next level. The goal for each level is to quickly climb several floors by escalator, ladder, or trampoline in the building she is in before the fire that is below her reaches her. These level settings start out from grade school settings to office type buildings. While jumping over obstacles, she must shoot various alien-like enemies that come after her on each floor. She can upgrade her weapon by destroying certain enemies as well as entering special hidden doorways which feature minigames which require you to jump obstacles. These doorways can also be used as a short-cut, and sometimes they are mandatory to be used in order to climb to the next floor. When Momoko reaches the top floor of a level, she must jump onto a small blimp flying above her to beat the level. Momoko begins as a four-year-old and ages through five levels. The final level is a bonus chance in which she is a twenty-year-old bride collecting items – the game concludes with her getting married, thus giving birth to a new Momoko and starting the cycle anew.

== Urusei Yatsura: Lum's Wedding Bell ==
In Urusei Yatsura: Lum's Wedding Bell (うる星やつら ラムのウェディングベル, Urusei Yatsura: Ramu no Uedingu Beru), the player controls Lum as she grows up and has to avoid alien invaders while trying to reach her rescue UFO. The game's storyline involves a severe earthquake striking in Tomobiki-cho (the town where the Urusei Yatsura series takes place) and tearing the space-time continuum, forcing Lum to have to travel forward through time in order to be reunited with her "darling" Ataru Moroboshi.

The player starts out at infant school, then works her way to elementary school, junior high school, high school, college, and finally the player marries a bridegroom (Ataru) in a white tie outfit. After that, the game starts over again. The game has never been released outside Japan.

City Connection announced a new port of Momoko 120% for the Family Computer in 2025 titled City Connection: Clarice no Wedding Bell (シティコネクション クラリスのウェディングベル, Shiti Konekushon Kurarisu no Uuedinggu Beru), which shares a similar name with this version, but now features Clarice, the protagonist of City Connection, as the main character.

== Reception ==
Reception

Review scores
Publication	Score
Beep	3/5 (FC)
Biweekly Famicom Tsūshin	4/10, 4/10, 7/10, 6/10 (FC) (Note: Each of the four reviewers in Famitsu scored the game on a ten point scale)

In Japan, Game Machine listed Momoko 120% as the 10th most successful table arcade unit of October 1986.

A review of the Urusei Yatsura Famicom game in Beep found the game to be "pretty ordinary", while concluding that even audiences who are not fans of the source material will enjoy the sight of Lum flying around the screen.

In the Bi-Weekly Famicom Tsūshin, two reviewers found the game unnecessarily difficult. Three of the reviewers complimented that the game looks cute, only recommending it to fans of anime or the Urusei Yatsura series.
