= Akira Murayama =

Japanese voice actor

- 村山 明
- Born: April 2, 1948 (age 78); Asakusa, Taitō City, Tokyo, Japan
- Occupation: Voice actor
- Years active: 1970–present
- Agent: Tokyo Actor's Consumer's Cooperative Society

Akira Murayama (村山 明, Murayama Akira; born April 2, 1948) is a Japanese voice actor from Tokyo, Japan. He is represented by Tokyo Actor's Consumer's Cooperative Society.

== Filmography ==
=== Television animation ===
- UFO Warrior Dai Apolon (1976) (Takeshi)
- The Story of Perrine (1978) (Faburi)
- Urusei Yatsura (1981) (Perm)
- Combat Mecha Xabungle (1982) (El Condor)
- Captain Tsubasa (1983) (Announcer)
- Saint Seiya (1986) (Cerberus Dante)
- Parasol Henbē (1989) (Megeru's father)
- Moomin (1990) (Survey Committee Member)
- Gambalist! Shun (1996) (Andreanof)
- Keroro Gunso (2006) (Robo Camron)

=== OVA ===
- Yōtōden (1987) (Narrator)
- Legend of the Galactic Heroes (1989) (Focker Axel Von Büro)
- The Silent Service (1995) (Koichiro Amatsu)

=== Theatrical animation ===
- Ganbare!! Tabuchi-kun!! Movie Series (1979–1980) (Announcer)
- Mobile Suit Gundam: Encounters in Space (1982) (Cameron Bloom)
- Mobile Suit Gundam: Char's Counterattack (1988) (Cameron Bloom)

=== Live action ===
- Big Bird in Japan (1989)
- H2 (1995–1996) - Announcer

=== Dubbing ===
- Alien: Resurrection (TV edition) (Dr. Gediman (Brad Dourif))
- All About Eve (South Korean television drama) (Seon-Dal (Pak Cheor))
- The Big Brawl (Jug (Peter Marc Jacobson))
- Die Hard (1992 Fuji TV edition) (Richard Thornburg (William Atherton))
- Die Hard 2 (1992 Fuji TV edition) (Dick Thornburg (William Atherton))
- Friday the 13th (1983 TV Asahi edition) (Jack Burrell (Kevin Bacon))
- Ghostbusters (1987 Fuji TV edition) (Roger Delacorte (John Rothman))
- Ghostbusters II (1992 Fuji TV edition) (Raymond Stantz (Dan Aykroyd))
- Never Say Never Again (1985 Fuji TV edition) (Nigel Small-Fawcett (Rowan Atkinson))
- The Simpsons (Sideshow Bob)
- Swordfish (Gabriel Shear (John Travolta))
- Taps (Cadet Captain Alex Dwyer (Sean Penn))
- Thunderbirds Are Go and Thunderbird 6 (Virgil Tracy)
- Time Bandits (1988 TV Asahi edition) (Robin Hood (John Cleese))
