= Toshio Furukawa =

Japanese actor (born 1946)

- 古川 登志夫
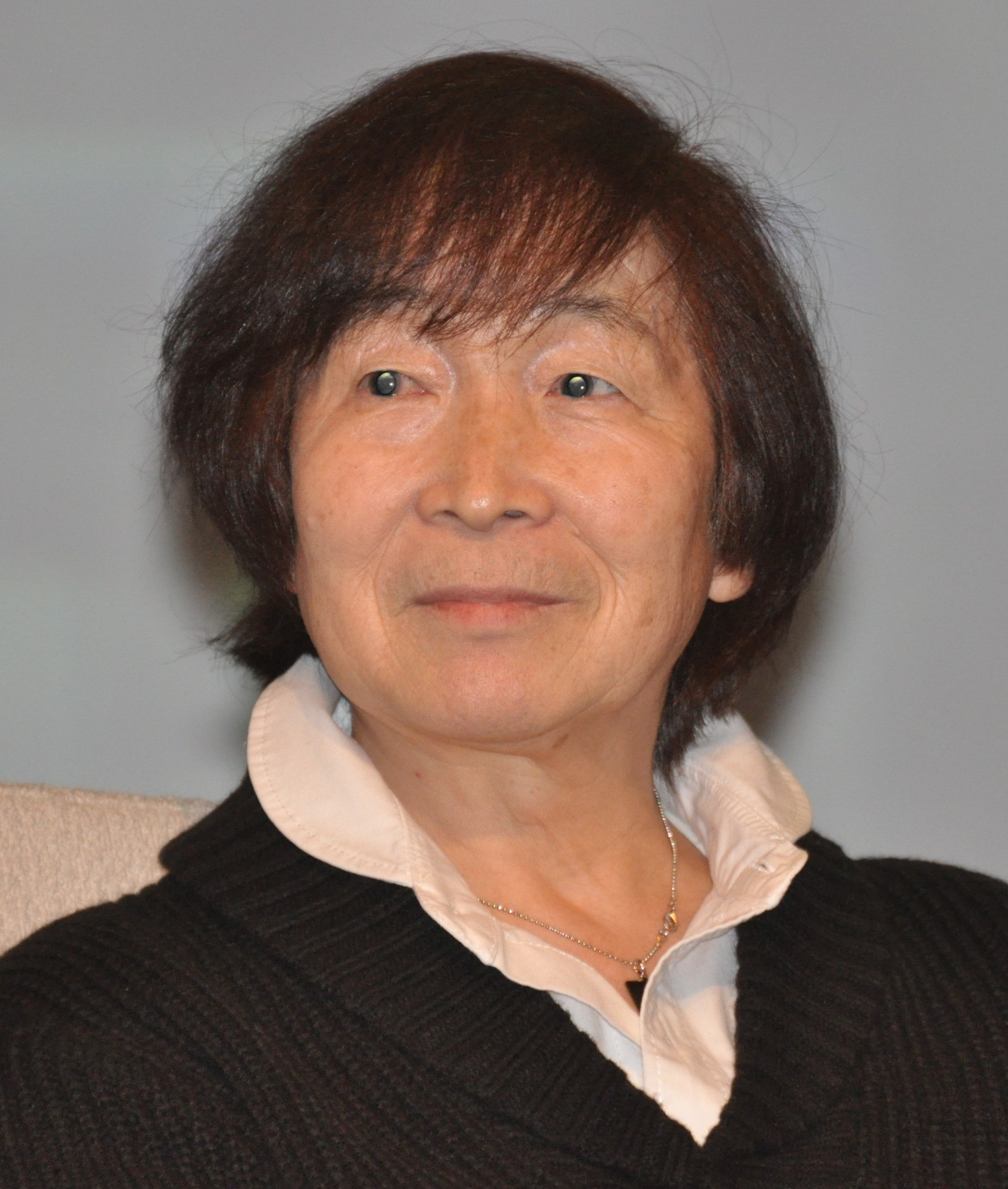
- Furukawa in 2012
- Born: July 16, 1946 (age 80); Ōhira, Shimotsuga District, Tochigi Prefecture, Japan
- Occupations: Actor; voice actor; narrator
- Years active: 1972–present
- Agent: Aoni Production
- Notable credit(s): Dragon Ball as Piccolo; Urusei Yatsura as Ataru Moroboshi
- Spouse: Shino Kakinuma
- Website: Official profile

Toshio Furukawa (古川 登志夫, Furukawa Toshio; born July 16, 1946 in Tochigi) is a Japanese actor, voice actor and narrator affiliated with Aoni Production. He is married to fellow voice actress Shino Kakinuma.

== Career ==
He became famous for roles in his career such as Piccolo (Dragon Ball), Ataru Moroboshi (Urusei Yatsura), Kagege (Sgt. Frog), Kai Shiden (Mobile Suit Gundam), Shin (Fist of the North Star), Asuma Shinohara (Mobile Police Patlabor), Portgas D. Ace (One Piece), Jann Lee (Dead or Alive) and Misao Yamamura (Case Closed). His debut voice acting role was as a soldier in Brave Raideen. Toshio is a veteran who has portrayed a variety of characters from comedians like Ataru in Urusei Yatsura and Inumaru in Gosenzo-sama Banbanzai!, to calm, serious ones like Shin in Fist of the North Star and Piccolo in Dragon Ball. Furthermore, Toshio is capable of performing with a "boy voice" and has played noble hot-blooded heroes such as Prince Mito of Saikyō Robo Daiōja and Kento Tate of Future Robo Daltanius.

He performed in the band Slapstick (スラップスティック) with Tōru Furuya, Kazuyuki Sogabe, Yūji Mitsuya and Akio Nojima. In 2007, Slapstick got together to pay tribute to former band members, Hirotaka Suzuoki and Kazuyuki Sogabe (guitar).

Furukawa owns a pet dog named Asuma (遊馬), a Shih Tzu that was named after Asuma Shinohara of Patlabor. His former pet was Ataru (あたる), which was named after Ataru Moroboshi of Urusei Yatsura. Ataru died in 2008 at age fifteen and was also a Shih Tzu. Tribute pages were made for both pets.

== Filmography ==
=== Television animation ===
Year	Title	Role
1975	Brave Raideen	Soldier B
1976	Magne Robo Gakeen	Houjou Takeru
1977	Wakusei Robo Danguard Ace	Hideto Oboshi
1979	Future Robo Daltanius	Kento Tate
1979	King Arthur and the Knights of the Round Table	Pellinore
1979	Mobile Suit Gundam	Kai Shiden
1979	Space Carrier Blue Noah	Leader Zytel and Domenico
1980	Trider G7	Genichi Ooyama
1981	Dr. Slump and Arale-chan	Taro Soramame, The Sun, Narration, etc.
1981	Urusei Yatsura (1981)	Ataru Moroboshi
1981	Saikyo Robo Daioja	Prince Mito
1982	Armored Fleet Dairugger XV	Aki Manabu
1982	Combat Mecha Xabungle	Blume
1983	Lightspeed ElectroGod Albegas	Daisaku Enjouji
1984	Galactic Patrol Lensman	Kimball Kinnison
1984	Hokuto no Ken	Shin
1984	The Kabocha Wine	Shunsuke Aoba
1985	Mobile Suit Zeta Gundam	Kai Shiden
1986	Anmitsu Hime	Dracula Jr.
1986	Dragon Ball	General Blue, Piccolo
1986	Maison Ikkoku	Sakamoto
1987	Kamen no Ninja Akakage	Akakage
1989	Dragon Ball Z	Piccolo
1989	Patlabor	Asuma Shinohara
1993	Aoki Densetsu Shoot	Yoshiharu Kubo
1995	Sailor Moon SuperS	Hawk's Eye
1996	Dragon Ball GT	Piccolo, Announcer
1997	Cutie Honey Flash	Alphonne
1997	Kindaichi Case Files	Hiroaki Sakurada
1998	Case Closed	Misao Yamamura
1999	The Big O	Eugene Grant
1999	One Piece	Portgas D. Ace
2000	Shinzo	Deathcrow
2001	PaRappa the Rapper	Teacher Bunny
2002	Kinnikuman Nisei Series	Suguru Kinniku
2004	Agatha Christie's Great Detectives Poirot and Marple	Charles
2004	Beet the Vandel Buster	Laio, Frausky
2004	Keroro Gunso	Kagege
2004	Samurai Champloo	Kagemaru
2005	Eureka Seven	William B. Baxter
2005	The Law of Ueki	Mūnin
2005	Tsubasa: Reservoir Chronicle	Gitsune
2006	xxxHolic	Gitsune
2007	Tetsuko no Tabi	Hideki Egami
2008	Soul Eater	Asura/Kishin
2008	Bleach	Kageroza Inaba
2009	Dragon Ball Kai	Piccolo
2011	Hunter × Hunter	Satotz
2012	Saint Seiya Omega	Southern Cross Kazuma
2012	Shirokuma Cafe	Tree Kangaroo
2012	Tsuritama	Narrator
2014	Mushishi: The Next Chapter	Kaoru
2014	Space Dandy	Ukuleleman
2015	World Trigger	Enedora
2015	Dragon Ball Super	Piccolo
2015	Ushio and Tora	Yamanmoto
2016	Mr. Osomatsu	Play-by-play announcer
2018	GeGeGe no Kitarō	Nezumi-Otoko
2018	Pop Team Epic	Popuko (Episode 2-B)
2018	Attack on Titan Season 3	Uri Reiss
2018	Karakuri Circus	Bai Jin, Faceless, Sadayoshi Saiga
2020	Oda Cinnamon Nobunaga	Date Boo Masamune
2021	Waccha PriMagi!	Nyanjii
2022	Dragon Quest: The Adventure of Dai	Myst
2022	Urusei Yatsura (2022)	Ataru's dad
2023	Akuma-kun	Mephisto II
2023	Demon Slayer: Kimetsu no Yaiba	Hantengu
2024	Kinnikuman: Perfect Origin Arc	Chairperson
2024	Uzumaki	Kirie's father

=== Original video animation (OVA) ===
- Urusei Yatsura (1985–2008) (Ataru Moroboshi)
- Lupin III: The Plot of the Fuma Clan (1987) (Arsène Lupin III)
- Bubblegum Crisis (1987–1991) (Leon McNichol)
- Appleseed (1988) (Calon)
- Crying Freeman (1988–1994) (Hinomura Yō a.k.a.Crying Freeman)
- Legend of the Galactic Heroes (1988–2000) (Olivier Poplin)
- Gosenzo-sama Banbanzai! (1989) (Inumaru Yomota)
- Saint Seiya: Elysion Hen (2008) (Thanatos)
- Mobile Suit Gundam Unicorn (2012–14) (Kai Shiden)
- Mobile Suit Gundam: The Origin (2016–18) (Kai Shiden)

=== Original net animation (ONA) ===
- Lupin Zero (2022) (Lupin II)
- Pluto (2023) (Professor Ochanomizu)

=== Theatrical animation ===
Year	Title	Role
1981	Dr. Slump and Arale-chan: Hello! Wonder Island	Taro Soramame
1981	Mobile Suit Gundam	Kai Shiden
1981	Mobile Suit Gundam: Soldiers of Sorrow	Kai Shiden
1981	Natsu e no Tobira	Lindo
1982	Mobile Suit Gundam: Encounters in Space	Kai Shiden
1982	Dr. Slump: "Hoyoyo!" Space Adventure	Taro Soramame
1983	Urusei Yatsura: Only You	Ataru Moroboshi
1983	Combat Mecha Xabungle	Burume
1983	Dr. Slump and Arale-chan: Hoyoyo, Great Round-the-World Race	Taro Soramame
1984	Urusei Yatsura 2: Beautiful Dreamer	Ataru Moroboshi
1984	Lensman: Secret of The Lens	Kimball Kinnison
1984	The Kabocha Wine: Nita no Aijou Monogatari	Shunsuke Aoba
1984	Dr. Slump and Arale-chan: Hoyoyo! The Treasure of Nanaba Castle	Taro Soramame
1985	Urusei Yatsura 3: Remember My Love	Ataru Moroboshi
1985	Dr. Slump and Arale-chan: Hoyoyo! Dream Capital Mechapolis	Taro Soramame
1985	Odin: Photon Sailer Starlight	Akira Tsukuba
1986	Urusei Yatsura 4: Lum the Forever	Ataru Moroboshi
1986	They Were Eleven	Doricas Soldam IV
1986	High School! Kimengumi	Jaki'ichi En
1986	The Phoenix: Chapter of Ho-o	Yamato no Akanemaru
1988	Urusei Yatsura: The Final Chapter	Ataru Moroboshi
1988	Legend of Galactic Heroes: My Conquest is the Sea of Stars	Olivier Poplan
1988	Saint Seiya: The Legend of Crimson Youth	Coma Berenices
1988	Dragon Ball: Mystical Adventure	General Blue
1988	Maison Ikkoku Final Chapter	Sakamoto
1989	Akuma-kun	Mephisto II
1989	Patlabor: The Movie	Asuma Shinohara
1989	Saint Seiya: Warriors of the Final Holy Battle	Thrones Mois
1989	Dragon Ball Z: Dead Zone	Piccolo
1990	Akuma-kun: Yōkoso Akuma-Land e!!	Mephisto II
1990	Dragon Ball Z: The World's Strongest	Piccolo
1990	MAROKO	Inumaru Yomota
1990	Dragon Ball Z: The Tree of Might	Piccolo
1991	Urusei Yatsura: Always My Darling	Ataru Moroboshi
1991	Dragon Ball Z: Lord Slug	Piccolo
1991	Dragon Ball Z: Cooler's Revenge	Piccolo
1992	Dragon Ball Z: The Return of Cooler	Piccolo
1992	Dragon Ball Z: Super Android 13!	Piccolo
1993	Patlabor 2: The Movie	Asuma Shinohara
1993	Dragon Ball Z: Broly – The Legendary Super Saiyan	Piccolo
1993	Dragon Ball Z: Bojack Unbound	Piccolo
1994	Ghost Sweeper Mikami	Mori Ranmaru
1995	Slam Dunk: Shohoku's Greatest Challenge! Burning Hanamichi Sakuragi	Michael Okita
1996	Crayon Shin-chan: Adventure in Henderland	Su Noman Pa
1996	Gegege no Kitaro: The Great Sea Beast	Chinpo
2001	Metropolis	General Kusai Skunk
2002	WXIII: Patlabor the Movie 3	Asuma Shinohara
2004	Doraemon: Nobita in the Wan-Nyan Spacetime Odyssey	Nyago
2005	Mobile Suit Zeta Gundam: A New Translation II - Heirs To The Stars	Kai Shiden
2006	Mobile Suit Zeta Gundam: A New Translation III - Love is the Pulse of the Stars	Kai Shiden
2007	Dr. Mashirito and Abale-chan	Taro Soramame
2008	GeGeGe no Kitarō: Japan Explodes!!	Aobōzu
2009	Detective Conan: The Raven Chaser	Misao Yamamura
2012	Detective Conan: The Eleventh Striker	Misao Yamamura
2013	Dragon Ball Z: Battle of Gods	Piccolo
2015	Dragon Ball Z: Resurrection 'F'	Piccolo
2018	Dragon Ball Super: Broly	Piccolo
2022	Dragon Ball Super: Super Hero	Piccolo
2022	Mobile Suit Gundam: Cucuruz Doan's Island	Kai Shiden
2023	Birth of Kitarō: The Mystery of GeGeGe	Nezumi-Otoko
2025	Scarlet	Innkeeper

=== Video games ===
Year	Title	Role
1991	Waku Waku Sonic Patrol Car	Sonic
1996	Tobal No. 1	Emperor Udan
1996	Dead or Alive	Jann Lee
1999	Dead or Alive 2	Jann Lee
2001	Dead or Alive 3	Jann Lee
2004	Kinnikuman Generations	Suguru Kinniku
2004	Everybody's Golf Portable	Jean
2005	Namco × Capcom	Taizo Hori, Joker
2005	Dead or Alive 4	Jann Lee
2006	Battle Stadium D.O.N	Piccolo
2006	Everybody's Tennis	Kaito
2006	Metal Gear Solid: Portable Ops	Roy Campbell
2007	Shining Force EXA	Adam, Bornay
2007	Everybody's Golf Portable 2	Jean
2009	Fragile: Sayonara Tsuki no Haikyo	Shin
2012	Project X Zone	Eins Belanos
2019	Jump Force	Piccolo
2022	SD Gundam Battle Alliance	Kai Shiden

- Dragon Ball series (1993–present) (Piccolo, General Blue)
- Mr. Driller series (1999–present) (Taizo Hori, Ataru Hori)

=== Tokusatsu ===
- Jumborg Ace (1974) (Worker (Actor), Dump Kong (Suit Actor))
- X-Bomber (1980) (Shiro Ginga)
- Tetsuwan Tantei Robotack (1998) (Takkard)
- Bakuryu Sentai Abaranger DELUXE: Abare Summer is Freezing Cold! Movie (2003) (Dimensional Drifter Galvidi)
- Tokusou Sentai Dekaranger (2004) (Narrator)
- Kamen Rider Wizard (2012) (Wiseman (Carbuncle (Ep. 8 - 47 (Ep. 48 Voice by Narushi Ikeda)))
- Kamen Rider × Kamen Rider Wizard & Fourze: Movie War Ultimatum (2012) (Wiseman)

=== Live-action film ===
- The Red Spectacles (1987)

=== Live-action television ===
- Shin Heike Monogatari (1972)

=== Dubbing roles ===
==== Live-action ====
- Billy Crystal
  - City Slickers (TV Tokyo edition) (Mitch Robbins)
  - Forget Paris (Mickey Gordon)
  - Analyze This (2001 TV Asahi edition) (Ben Sobel M.D.)
  - Parental Guidance (Artie Decker)
  - Small Apartments (Burt Walnut)
- Aliens (2003 Ultimate Edition) (Bishop (Lance Henriksen))
- Alien 3 (2005 Ultimate Edition) (Bishop (Lance Henriksen))
- Back to the Future (1989 TV Asahi edition) (George McFly (Crispin Glover))
- CHiPs (Ponch (Erik Estrada))
- Dave (1997 TV Asahi edition) (Dave Kovic (Kevin Kline))
- Fargo (2002 TV Tokyo edition) (Jerry Lundegaard (William H. Macy))
- Ghost World (Seymour (Steve Buscemi))
- The Ice Storm (Ben Hood (Kevin Kline))
- Independence Day (1999 TV Asahi edition) (U.S. President Thomas J. Whitmore (Bill Pullman))
- Killing Eve (Paul (Steve Pemberton))
- The Last Emperor (1989 TV Asahi edition) (Camp Interrogator (Ric Young))
- Little House on the Prairie (Almanzo Wilder (Dean Butler))
- Monty Python (Terry Gilliam)
- Mr. Vampire (Man-choi (Ricky Hui))
- Out of Africa (2012 DVD and Blu-ray editions) (Denys Finch Hatton (Robert Redford))
- Speed (1998 TV Asahi edition) (Harry Temple (Jeff Daniels))
- The World Is Not Enough (2003 TV Asahi edition) (Victor "Renard" Zokas (Robert Carlyle))

==== Animation ====
- Antz (Z)
- House of Mouse (Panchito Pistoles)
- Legend of the Three Caballeros (Panchito Gonzalez)
- Robots (Herb Copperbottom)
- The Three Caballeros (1994 dub ver) (Panchito Pistoles)
- Watership Down (Hazel)

== Awards ==
Year	Award	Category	Result	Ref.
1982	5th Anime Grand Prix	Most Popular Voice Actor of the Year	Won	
2024	18th Seiyu Awards	Merit Award	Honored	
