= List of Urusei Yatsura characters =

From left; Ryunosuke, Ran, Sakura, Shutaro (back), Hot Springs Emblem (middle), Cherry (front), Ten, Lum, Ataru, Shinobu, and Kotatsu Kitty. Also included are two members of a recurring, half-fish alien race, one of Ryoko's kuroko, and an octopus.

The Urusei Yatsura manga series features a large ensemble cast of characters created by Rumiko Takahashi. It tells the story of Japanese teenager Ataru Moroboshi, and the alien Lum, who believes she is Ataru's wife after he accidentally proposes to her. The series contains many other characters, whose unusual characteristics and eccentric personalities drive most of the stories. In addition to extraterrestrials, it includes many appearances from figures in Japanese mythology and history.

== Main characters ==
=== Ataru Moroboshi ===
Ataru Moroboshi (諸星あたる, Moroboshi Ataru) is the main protagonist of the series. A 17-year-old lazy student at Tomobiki High School, Class 2–4, Ataru suffers from an incredible amount of bad luck, having been born on Friday the 13th, during a major earthquake, and Butsumetsu, the unluckiest day of the Buddhist calendar. Thanks to this lack of good fortune, his triumph in the game of tag that saves Earth from an Oni invasion turns into a defeat for him. His victory statement, intended to confirm his girlfriend Shinobu's promise to marry him if he won, is misinterpreted by Lum to be a marriage proposal. Much to his chagrin, she accepts.

Lum's arrival strains Ataru's relationship with Shinobu. But Ataru has always been very lecherous. His main goal in life is to live in the center of a harem composed of exotic and beautiful women, including Lum and most of her alien friends. Usually, he just walks up to a woman he has never met before and asks for her name, phone number, and address. If Lum, who now views him as her husband, should witness these usually futile flirting efforts, she regularly zaps him with massive quantities of electricity, but they do nothing to slow him down. Ataru may come across as academically unaccomplished and unwilling to make an effort, but he is actually quite intelligent, able to manipulate situations to his advantage. Though he often tries to escape from Lum and openly flirts with other women, he begins to truly love Lum, while steadfastily refusing to admit it.

=== Lum ===
Lum (ラム, Ramu) is the female protagonist of the series. She is a beautiful Oni (translated in English as "ogre") alien who is capable of flying and generating electrical shocks and even lightning (resembling the thunder god Raijin). She is usually seen wearing her signature outfit of a tiger-striped bikini and knee-high go-go boots. As an alien she has access to many bizarre gadgets whose use she does not always understand completely, often leading to comic results. After misinterpreting Ataru's words as a marriage proposal, Lum quickly agrees to marry the human.^{[ch. 1]} When Ataru unwittingly racks up an insurmountable amount of debt to an alien taxi driver who starts plundering oil from all over Earth, Lum agrees to pay off the debt in exchange for being allowed to live at the Moroboshi house.^{[ch. 3]} Although she is extremely popular with men, Lum's only dream in life is to be with Ataru, whom she calls her "Darling". If her and Ataru get into a fight, Lum may retreat to her spaceship that she keeps above the Moroboshi home.^{[ch. 5]} While generally good-natured, sweet, faithful, and innocent, Lum also has a very hot temper that is usually directed at Ataru when he leches on other women. She has a unique way of speaking, similar to that of young Japanese girls who are trying to be overly cute.

== Humans ==
=== Shinobu Miyake ===
Shinobu Miyake (三宅 しのぶ, Miyake Shinobu) is Ataru's childhood friend and classmate. At the beginning of the series she is also Ataru's girlfriend, but Lum's arrival strains the relationship. Shinobu claims that if Ataru wins the game of tag, she would marry him, which encourages Ataru to win, but his victory cry leads to a misunderstanding where Lum agrees to marry him.^{[ch. 1]} Shinobu is a neat, sweet and petite young lady. Despite these feminine characteristics, she often displays super-human strength, able to easily throw the school desks or any other large/heavy object as needed; however, this strength tends to only show itself in anger involving either Lum or Ataru. When Shutaro Mendo arrives at their school, Shinobu, like all the other girls in class, develops a crush on him at first sight. This causes her to question her feelings for Ataru, and turns the love triangle of her, Ataru and Lum, into a four-way entanglement.^{[ch. 25,30]} As the series progresses, however, Shinobu gives up on both Ataru and Shutaro and ends up meeting Inaba, whom she eventually goes steady with. She is voiced by Saeko Shimazu (first series) and Maaya Uchida (second series) in Japanese, and Katherine Burten (Those Obnoxious Aliens), Danielle Sullivan (first series), Jeannette Ann Wallace (second movie) and Cat Thomas (second series) in English.

=== Shutaro Mendo ===
Shutaro Mendo (面堂 終太郎, Mendō Shūtarō) is heir to the Mendo conglomerate with staggering wealth and its own private army. Upon his transfer to Tomobiki High, he and Ataru immediately become enemies.^{[ch. 22]} Although very handsome, charming, and intelligent, on occasions Mendo succumbs to lechery and resembles Ataru, just more respectful and sophisticated in his approach. The two are much more alike than either would like to admit.^{[ch. 23]} Shutaro takes his role as heir to the vast Mendo fortune extremely seriously.^{[ch. 30]} A descendant of a samurai family, Shutaro often carries a katana with him, which at any moment could be flying at Ataru's face. He has a team of men in sunglasses who act as his personal retainers. Mendo is fond of octopuses and keeps a large number of them as loyal pets. He has a sibling rivalry with his younger sister, Ryoko.

Mendo is narcissistic, overly dramatic, claustrophobic and afraid of the dark. But due to his vanity, his phobias incredibly disappear when a girl can see him.^{[ch. 30]} Ataru often plays on Mendo's fears by putting a large bell over him, forming a dark enclosed area where a girl can not see him. However, this has resulted in him breaking these bells out of sheer terror. The girls at school have formed a fan club for Mendo and they will do anything to protect him. Though Shinobu is the closest thing he has to a girlfriend, Mendo has feelings for Lum, tolerating Ataru's presence in order to be close to her. He is voiced by Akira Kamiya (first series) and Mamoru Miyano (second series) in Japanese, and by Robert Rogan, Russell Wait (Animax), Brian Hudson, Vinnie Penna in various English dubs, and Jack Stansbury (second series).

=== Cherry ===
Cherry (チェリー, Cherī) is a wandering Buddhist monk who often appears out of nowhere predicting doom for Ataru. In the anime, his arrival is followed immediately by a large explosion (which can be merely comedic or causing actual damage to the area). His real name is Sakuranbo (錯乱坊), which literally means "cherry" in Japanese. But because the kanji can be read to mean "deranged monk," a phrase that is quite accurate in describing him, he prefers to be called by the English word as he thinks that the monastic life is very similar to a cherry "sweet outside and all core inside".

Cherry has amazing spiritual powers, but does not always seem to be in complete control of them. His ugly face and very short stature are frequently used for comedic effect, or even as a defense against attackers. Cherry has made a vow of asceticism, living in a tent in an empty lot not far from Ataru's house. However, his vow apparently does not apply to food, as he is exceedingly gluttonous, and often offers his services in exchange for a free meal (or simply blatantly eating other's food despite not planning to help with anything). Cherry is voiced by Ichiro Nagai (first series) and Wataru Takagi (second series) in Japanese, and by Eric Paisley (Those Obnoxious Aliens) and John Swasey (second series) in English.

=== Sakura ===
Sakura (サクラ) is a Shinto priestess or miko, who also makes a living as the school nurse at Tomobiki High. She first appears as a sickly young woman who offers to exorcise Ataru's evil spirits. During the process the spirits who inhabit her transfer themselves to the unlucky young man, rendering her perfectly healthy.^{[ch. 4]} Soon afterward, she takes the job as Tomobiki High's school nurse.^{[ch. 37]} Her mother is Cherry's younger twin sister, but unlike them, Sakura is tall, slender and physically attractive.^{[ch. 4]} This causes her an incredible number of problems; from the lecherous boys of the school,^{[ch. 38]} to even hordes of demons, her beauty draws a lot of unwanted attention. She is engaged to Tsubame Ozuno (尾津乃つばめ) who studied sorcery in the West, although he is not particularly good at it.^{[ch. 19]} Like her uncle, Sakura possesses an unbelievably enormous appetite, which sometimes see them get into fights over food.^{[ch. 46]} Sakura is extremely powerful and can summon foul and baleful creatures from Japanese folklore, by virtue of her mystical training. Voiced by Machiko Washio (first series) and Miyuki Sawashiro (second series) in Japanese, and by Karen McIntyre (films) and Brianna Roberts (second series) in English.

=== Ryunosuke Fujinami ===
Ryunosuke Fujinami (藤波 竜之介, Fujinami Ryūnosuke), nicknamed "Ryu" (竜), is a female student at Tomobiki High who has been raised as a boy by her eccentric father. Wanting a male heir to take over the family's beach cafe, Ryunosuke's father gave her a masculine name and raised her as a boy her whole life. Although Ryunosuke is interested in living like a girl, her father does everything he can to prevent this and denies her the chance to even try on female clothing.^{[ch. 148]} As such she wears the male student uniform at school, and is often treated as male. Ryunosuke is kind, but has been raised to fight and is constantly antagonized by her father into destructive fights, one of which results in the family cafe being destroyed.^{[ch. 147]} The two move to Tomobiki and move into the high school, which Ryunosuke attends while her father runs the school shop.^{[ch. 148]}

Members of both sexes are attracted to Ryunosuke; for example, she receives more Valentine's Day cards than even Mendo, due to getting them from boys and girls alike. She is quite sensitive about being called a boy, and will do almost anything to convince the unknowing person that she is in fact a girl; often when this happens, her father will suddenly show up just to interfere and keep them believing that she is a boy. Ryunosuke's greatest desire is to behave appropriately for her gender, but she had no female role models growing up and therefore does not really know what that entails. Exacerbating this is the fact that Ryunosuke's father has often lied to her to suit his own desires, and she never had any reason not to believe him. But since associating with people other than her father, she is learning that many things he said were lies, and now knows better than to believe him. About the only thing he can consistently trick her with is information about her mother, of which he never really reveals anything, using it as yet another way to trick or just make fun of Ryunosuke. Late in the series, Ryunosuke encounters the ghosts of her father's friend and his son, Nagisa, whom it had been decided would marry Ryunosuke. Events happen and Nagisa gets brought back to life. However, he has the same, though reversed, quirk in his upbringing as Ryunosuke: he was raised as a girl, and as such acts like and dresses as a girl. Despite this, he is even stronger than Ryunosuke, which she doesn't really like. As things happen, he ends up moving in with Ryunosuke and her father. Animerica cited the gender-bending Ryunosuke as a prototype for Ukyo Kuonji in Takahashi's later series Ranma ½. Ryunosuke is voiced by Mayumi Tanaka (first series) and Ayahi Takagaki (second series) in Japanese, and by Morgan Jarrett in English.

=== Hot Springs Emblem ===
Hot Springs Emblem (温泉マーク, ♨, Onsen Māku) is the homeroom teacher of Ataru's class at Tomobiki High.^{[ch. 22]} A middle-aged man, his only interest is to teach, but he fails due to the constant interruptions during class. His nickname literally translates to "onsen mark", a reference to the Japanese symbol that represents hot springs which is printed all over his clothing (in the anime, the symbol is only on his tie and the back of his jacket). Early in the series, he claims to have a wife and children.^{[ch. 14]} In the anime, he lives the life of a loser, residing in a flophouse apartment, with an unrequited love for Sakura. He is voiced by Michihiro Ikemizu (first series) and Kenta Miyake (second series) in Japanese, and by Bradley Evans (public TV and movies 3–6), Sean Barret (BBC 3), T. Roy Barnes (movie 2), and David Wald (second series) in English.

== Aliens ==
=== Benten ===
Benten (弁天) is a member of the Fukujin alien clan and a childhood friend of Lum, Oyuki, and Ran, whom she attended elementary school with. Benten is a "space biker chick" who wears a plate-mail bikini, rides around the sky on an airbike, and carries a high-tech bazooka. Her clan and Lum's Oni clan hold an annual battle on their home planet during its spring equinox.^{[ch. 8]} Aside from being a good hand-to-hand fighter and having the aforementioned bazooka, she appears to have no special powers. As children, Benten and Lum often instigated trouble that usually resulted in Ran getting hurt. Her character is named after Benzaiten, the Shinto goddess of knowledge, art, and beauty.

=== Oyuki ===
Oyuki (おユキ) is the queen of Neptune, a frozen, snowy planet populated entirely by women, as most of the men go off to find work.^{[ch. 10]} She is a childhood friend of Lum, Benten, and Ran, whom she attended elementary school with.^{[ch. 180]} Of the four of them she is the only one who was never in trouble, due to her cool level-headedness, she would decline to take part. Oyuki is clearly patterned after the yuki-onna (literally "snow woman") of Japanese folklore, having the power to control and create ice, snow, and extreme cold. She uses fourth-dimensional passages to travel or send items through.^{[ch. 10]} Typically dressed in a long, elegant kimono, she is soft-spoken, regal in demeanor and very slow to show anger. Ran seems able to feel Oyuki's anger, real or imagined, though she is never believed by others when she shows fear about it.^{[ch. 217]} She is voiced by Noriko Ohara (first series) and Saori Hayami (second series) in Japanese, and by Jamie Phelps in English.

=== Ran ===
Ran (ラン) is an alien of unspecified race and planet. During childhood, Ran became best friends with Lum, Benten, and Oyuki, whom she attended elementary school with.^{[ch. 180]} As a child, Ran was often hurt or got into trouble because of the antics of the more carefree and irresponsible Lum. The two were also both in love with Rei, who became Lum's fiancé. For these reasons, Ran comes to Earth in order to get revenge against Lum.^{[ch. 55]} By enrolling in Tomobiki High and pretending to be human, Ran plans to steal Ataru from Lum, just so she can kiss him and drain his youth away.^{[ch. 55]} However, after finally managing to do so, it fails due to a youth potion that Ataru accidentally takes. From then on, Ran changes tactics to getting revenge 'directly' on Lum, usually dragging in everyone nearby as well; these bouts of revenge are usually triggered by her calm and friendly reminiscing of the past leading her to remember something unpleasant.

=== Rei ===
Rei (レイ) is a very handsome oni and Lum's ex-fiancé, who woos almost any girl that sees his face, often causing despair to other males when their girlfriend/wife go after him.^{[ch. 6]} When he gets excited, Rei transforms into an "ushi-oni", a huge creature resembling a cross between a tiger and a bull.^{[ch. 6]} He has an insatiable appetite, seemingly caring about nothing but food. Unable to speak Japanese, Rei can only speak 1-5 words at a time, usually needing notes to do so.^{[ch. 7]} When younger, Ran and Lum were both in love with Rei for his looks; he became engaged to Lum, breaking Ran's heart and driving her to hate and seek revenge against her childhood friend. Lum eventually broke up with Rei, no longer able to tolerate his low, simple intelligence and insatiable appetite; however, he followed her to Earth to regain her love. He is extremely jealous of Ataru and transforms when enraged. Rei is voiced by Tesshō Genda (first series) and Katsuyuki Konishi (second series) in Japanese, and by Jeremy Griffin in the English dub of the movies. In the English dub Lum the Invader Girl that aired in the UK, Rei's name was Anglicized to "Raymond".

=== Ten ===
Ten (テン) is Lum's young Oni alien cousin who starts living with her on Earth. He has a single horn on his head, can breathe fire, flies very slowly, and wears a tiger-striped diaper.^{[ch. 63]} Ten and Ataru utterly loathe each other and often fight, with Ten spewing fire at him, destroying their surroundings, and often hitting someone else instead. They tend to display some similarities in their personalities, including girl-chasing. In some ways they are similar to brothers. Ten has a crush on Sakura, but unlike Ataru he is more successful in getting close to her by using his age-based cuteness and presumed innocence.^{[ch. 64,65]} He is often called "Jari-Ten" (ジャリテン) by the male characters. In Japanese, adding "jari-" is similar to "twerp" or "brat". Ten's parents are never around as they work a lot; Ten's mother (テンの母, Ten no Haha) is an airbike-riding firefighter who hates anyone who plays with fire, thus the usually fire-spewing pyromaniac Ten is on his best behavior when she does check-in on him.^{[ch. 160]} Ten appears much earlier in the anime than in the manga. In the anime he comes to Earth in a spaceship inside a "peach" to live with Lum when his Oni powers first manifest. Ten is voiced by Kazuko Sugiyama (first series) and Aoi Yūki (second series) in Japanese, and by Mindy L. Lyons (Those Obnoxious Aliens), Shannon Settlemyre (movie 1, 3–6) and Paula Parker (movie 2) in English.

=== Kurama ===
Kurama (クラマ) is the humanoid princess of the Karasutengu ("crow goblin") alien race. With their race dying out and no humanoid men on their planet, Kurama was placed in a cryogenic sleep while her talking crow attendants search other planets for a suitable mate who is to awaken her with a kiss.^{[ch. 16]} Unfortunately for her, one chooses Ataru for the job. Although she has no desire to sleep with him, Kurama can not help but want Ataru when she sees he is already claimed by Lum and Shinobu, and goes to great lengths to turn the perverted letch into a man worthy of fathering her children.^{[ch. 16,17]} However, she everntually finds the task impossible and tries to avoid Ataru. Kurama's father was Yoshitsune Minamoto, a legendary figure of Japanese history, whom she considers to be her ideal man.^{[ch. 18]} It was also later found that the current mating traditions of her race were set in place by an ancient ancestor who had his children the same way, and merely wanted that memory to last forever. However, this reason had been untold to the immediately following generation and as such all to follow, leading to Kurama's eventual discovery and great annoyance at it having caused her so much troubles. Kurama attacks with a large leaf, usually by simply blowing people away with wind, but it also has various other functions. She is voiced by Rihoko Yoshida (first series) and Nana Mizuki (second series) in Japanese, and by Daisy Talley (movie 1), Stacey Jefferson (BBC 3) and Chaney Moore (Sentai Filmworks) in English.

== Recurring characters ==
=== Ryoko Mendo ===
Ryoko Mendo (面堂了子, Mendō Ryōko) is the younger sister of Shutaro. Ryoko is a spoiled girl whose only amusement seems to be the creation and execution of elaborate plans intended to drive her older brother mad. Sometimes, just for fun, she flirts with Ataru, whom her brother has banned from setting foot inside the massive Mendo mansion (not that it ever stops him). Her schemes frequently drag Lum and her friends along and result in massive physical damage to all involved, especially Shutaro, except herself. She is attended to by masked kuroko who perform her every wish. Ryoko says she is in love with Shutaro's rival Tobimaro Mizunokoji, but we're not sure if she's serious, since she has said the same thing about Ataru and her brother's personal guard. She excels at playing the innocent bystander, even as she sets up all the carnage that surrounds her. Ryoko is voiced by Mami Koyama (first series) and Marina Inoue (second series) in Japanese, and by Michele Seidman (TV and movie 3 dub) and Toni Barry (BBC 3) in English.

=== Tobimaro Mizunokoji ===
Tobimaro burns with passion as the Mendo siblings look on, as seen in the first anime.

Tobimaro Mizunokoji (水乃小路飛麿, Mizunokōji Tobimaro) is the son of the Mizunokoji sporting goods empire, and Shutaro's rival.^{[ch. 40]} Nicknamed "Ton" (トン) by Shutaro, the two have been rivals since childhood due to the Mendo family being of samurai lineage and the Mizunokoji family an aristocratic lineage.^{[ch. 40]} After Tobimaro lost a baseball-related altercation as children, he has trained in the mountains for revenge, coming down once a year to challenge Shutaro; to-date, all eleven matches have been draws.^{[ch. 40]} Despite his immense wealth, he does not take advantage of it the way his rival does, choosing instead to dress in a ragged samurai robe and carries his bats on his back. Also unlike his rival, Tobimaro's personal retainers are all women in sunglasses.^{[ch. 44]} He has also shown the odd ability to eat nearly anything that enters his mouth and fully regurgitate it, most notably baseballs. Tobimaro takes a warrior's approach to the game of baseball, believing it to be about life and death, and no place for women.^{[ch. 40]} There is however a woman in his life: Shutaro's sister Ryoko, who scares him to death because of her love of torture. After he learns of his own sister, Asuka, and her quickly developed terror of males, Tobimaro refuses to accept her mistaken love for him, despite the frequent pain and extreme bodily damage that results. Though he carries himself with an air of nobility, his clumsiness ruins the effect. His eyes have star-shaped pupils, something Takahashi did as a spoof of a 1970s sports manga; she later made it a defining characteristic of the entire Mizunokoji family (except Tobimaro's father, who is the adopted son-in-law of the Mizunokoji family). In Japanese, Tobimaro is voiced by Kazuhiko Inoue and Bin Shimada in the first series, and by Yuki Kaji in the second series. In English, he is voiced by Scott Whiteside (public TV and movie 4) and David Jarvis (BBC 3).

=== Asuka Mizunokoji ===
Asuka Mizunokoji (水乃小路飛鳥) is Tobimaro's sister. The very beautiful and petite girl was isolated, according to the Mizonokoji family's tradition, from any and all males from the moment of her birth until the age of 16, at which time an omiai will be held for her to get married. As such, even her brother was unaware of her existence until then. Thanks to her daily training and the genetics she inherited from her mother, she is insanely strong (once tearing a completely armored tank apart and fashioning it into a makeshift suit of armor on herself with her bare hands), as well as very athletic (being able to run 100 metres within 12 seconds, while wearing her 200 kilogram suit of armour). Nevertheless, she is extremely timid and deathly afraid of males (as a result of her isolation), in part because the first one she ever met was Ataru Moroboshi. Now whenever she sees one, she pushes him away, screams "Eek! A maaan!" ("Aa~! Otokoo~!") (ああ～！おとこ～～！), and runs in terror at high speed from all males, not heeding any obstacles unfortunate to be in her path (such as buildings). Due to her being raised not even knowing the existence of or what a "male" is, Asuka is very confused about gender roles and family ties. Due to an early explanation on the subject, which was not received clearly, she feels romantic urges toward her elder brother, Tobimaro, and often sneaks into his bed at night. In addition, she believes Shuutaro Mendo is also her "big brother" because she once overheard Ryoko Mendo refer to him that way. Asuka is engaged to Shuutaro in an Omiai, by arrangement of their parents, as a means of ending the age-old Mendo-Mizunokoji family rivalry. Unfortunately, as a simple "light hug" from her causes multiple broken bones and internal injuries, it seems unlikely that this relationship will ever be consummated, as Shuutaro is rather terrified of being crushed. She is voiced by Sumi Shimamoto (first series) and M.A.O (second series) in Japanese.

=== Kotatsu Kitty ===
Kotatsu Kitty (コタツネコ, Kotatsu Neko) is the very large spirit of a cat from the Edo period who died after his owners threw him out into the cold.^{[ch. 111]} After being brought to the Moroboshi house by Ten, he discovers a love of kotatsu.^{[ch. 111]} He then makes numerous further appearances, usually seen drinking tea or eating taiyaki at a kotatsu, often with the principal.^{[ch. 118,159]} After Kotatsu Kitty's introductory chapter, Takahashi's editor at the time liked the character so much that he asked her to have him reappear. The artist said he was fun and easy to draw. Kotatsu Kitty is voiced by Tomohiro Nishimura in Japanese.

=== Principal ===
The unnamed principal (校長先生, Kōchō-sensei) of Tomobiki High is a balding man who wears glasses. He is always very calm, rarely reacting to the strange things that happen at the school. He often organizes strange competitions and outings for the students that are intended to increase school spirit, but they never turn out as he plans. The principle is often seen with Kotatsu Kitty. The principal is voiced by Tomomichi Nishimura in Japanese.

=== Kosuke Shirai ===
Kosuke Shirai (白井 コースケ, Shirai Kōsuke) is Ataru's freckled classmate and best friend. He is often involved with Ataru's usual mischief. Though he seems to be in love with Lum and Sakura like all of the male students, he has a girlfriend of his own.^{[ch. 36]} The only animation that Kosuke appears in is The Obstacle Course Swim Meet OVA. In the other animated adaptations, his roles are given to Lum's Stormtroopers, usually Perm. He gets his name from Takahashi's then-editor at Shogakukan. Kosuke is voiced by Kappei Yamaguchi in Japanese.

=== Ryunosuke's father ===
Ryunosuke's father (竜之介の父, Ryūnosuke no Chichi) is an overbearing and domineering man who forces his daughter, Ryunosuke Fujinami, to act like a male. The Fujinami family has run a small beach cafe for three generations, and he desires a male heir to one day take over the business from him.^{[ch. 147]} However, his late wife Masako (真砂子) left him only a daughter, so he gave her the masculine name Ryunosuke and raises her as a boy. Although Ryunosuke is interested in living like a girl, her father does everything he can to prevent this and denies her the chance to even try on female clothing.^{[ch. 148]} Having raised Ryunosuke to fight, the two constantly get into fist fights, one of which results in the family cafe being destroyed.^{[ch. 147]} The two move to Tomobiki and move into the high school, where Ryunosuke enrolls and her father runs the school shop in order to save up money and rebuild the cafe.^{[ch. 148]} Mr. Fujinami also lies to his daughter about anything to suit his needs or desires, and has done so since she was a child. Growing up, Ryunosuke had no reason to doubt him and always believed it; but now that she is older and is actually associating with people other than her father, she is learning that many things he said were lies, and knows better than to believe him. The thing Mr. Fujinami lies about most is his wife, only willing to say general things like "she was beautiful", but never giving any real information; this is a difficult thing for Ryunosuke to try to counter, since she sincerely wants to know about her mother, leading her to often fall for some trick at the hands of her father. However, it is possible that he has forgotten what she looks like altogether. Ryunosuke's father is always wearing a shirt with "I ❤ the Ocean (海が好き, Umi ga Suki) printed on it, while the name of the family cafe is "We ❤ the Ocean".^{[ch. 147]} He is voiced by Masahiro Anzai (first series) and Shigeru Chiba (second series) in Japanese and Langley McArol in English.

=== Ataru's parents ===
Ataru's father (あたるの父, Ataru no Chichi) is a typical salaryman. Wearing a yukata around the house, he desires a nice and quiet homelife. In the anime his home is frequently destroyed, causing him to lament over the mortgage. He's most often portrayed reading the newspaper, something he appears to have endless copies of as he pulls another one out after someone takes his away or destroys it. Quiet, timid, and possessing very little dignity, he tries his best to hide his face behind the newspaper during bad situations, often wishing he'd be treated better since he's the sole provider for the family. Like his wife, he tends to treat their "daughter-in-law" better than their son as they prefer having a daughter (especially compared to their lecherous fool of a son). He is voiced by Kenichi Ogata (first series) and Toshio Furukawa (second series) in Japanese, by Marc Matney (public TV), Alan Marsh (BBC3), Jerry Winsett (movies 1 and 3–6), and Larry Robinson (movie 2) in English.

Ataru's mother (あたるの母, Ataru no Haha) is a typical housewife. In early chapters, she often says "I never should've had him" (産むんじゃなかった, Umun ja nakatta) when Ataru causes problems. Mrs. Moroboshi is frequently so embarrassed by Ataru's antics that she is afraid to show her face in public (for good reason, because Ataru is a constant source of juicy gossip for her neighbours), and especially dreads going to his school for parent-teacher conferences. She sometimes dreams that a handsome young man (like Rei) will take her away from her miserable life. At numerous times she has shown to have been part of the source of Ataru's personality, acting selfishly, shifting blame, and yelling (though more often in frustration). Despite this, she also shows her caring nature, such as increasing her husband's lunch money while they were nearly out of money. She is voiced by Natsumi Sakuma (first series) and Keiko Toda (second series) in Japanese, by Dorothy Rankin (public TV), Stacey Jefferson (BBC3), Belinda Keller (movies 1 and 3–6), and Jackie Tantillo (movie 2) in English.

Lum with her parents, Ten, and his mother, as seen in the first anime

=== Lum's parents ===
Lum's father (ラムの父, Ramu no Chichi) is a huge, pudgy oni, and tends to be loud and scary. However, he is just as afraid of his wife as Ataru is of Lum, as evidenced by the time that she threw her husband out of the house when he got mad at her for trying to put him on a diet. Lum's mother (ラムの母, Ramu no Haha) is a pretty woman who can only speak in the oni language, which appears in the manga as Mahjong tiles,^{[ch. 51]} and in the subtitled anime as Greek lettering. In the anime, she can produce electric shocks, like Lum. Both parents can also fly, but they never show any other obvious powers. Lum's father is voiced by Ritsuo Sawa (first series) and Rikiya Koyama (second series) in Japanese, and David Krause (Those Obnoxious Aliens) and Anthony Lawson (movies) in English. Lum's mother is voiced by Reiko Yamada (first series) and Fumi Hirano (second series) in Japanese, and Kristen Foster in English.

=== Lum's Stormtroopers ===
Lum's Stormtroopers (ラム親衛隊, Ramu Shin'eitai; lit. 'Lum's Bodyguards') are four boys from the same class as Ataru who are in love with Lum and have sworn to protect her from Ataru. They are best friends but often end up fighting amongst themselves when the situation involves Lum. In the original manga, the four characters are unnamed and appear less after Mendo makes his debut.

==== Megane ====
Megane (メガネ) is the leader of the Stormtroopers, whose nickname means "eyeglasses". His real name is Satoshi (サトシ) ("Alvin Seville" in most foreign dubs), revealed in the final episode of the anime. An otaku in every sense, he loves Lum immensely, and has sworn to serve her. Megane has a strong personality and generally directs the schemes of the Stormtroopers to gain Lum's attention (though mostly for himself). He closely monitors the actions of the others to prevent them from looking at other girls, and to ensure their complete loyalty to Lum. Though usually antagonistic towards Ataru, he often hangs out with him in his spare time. He is often given to loud, rambling philosophical musings and outbursts, and seems to have an affinity for fascism and communism. He is voiced by Chiba Shigeru in Japanese, by Marc Garber (Those Obnoxious Aliens), Colin Hackman, and Craig Wollman (movies) in English.

==== Perm ====
Perm (パーマ, Pāma) is one of the Stormtroopers, whose nickname is derived from his hairstyle. He is tall and skinny (though his nameless manga counterpart has quite a fatter form) and his real name is Kosuke. The anime's version of the character is the counterpart to the manga's Kosuke Shirai. Perm displays the most character development, including being the only one of the Stormtroopers to have a visible girlfriend. He is voiced by Akira Murayama in Japanese, by Adrian Monte, and Jonathan Guggenheim (Those Obnoxious Aliens) in English.

==== Chibi ====
Chibi (チビ), real name Akira (アキラ), is a Stormtrooper often seen with Kakugari. His nickname is derived from his height; "chibi" means "small" or "short". He is a timid crybaby, speaks with a cracked voice, and is often beaten up by the rest of the gang. He also has buck teeth (though his nameless manga counterpart does not have this). He is voiced by Issei Futamata in Japanese, and Steven Paul in English.

==== Kakugari ====
Kakugari (カクガリ), real name Hiroyuki (ヒロユキ), is a Stormtrooper with a large build. His nickname is derived from his hairstyle; "kakugari" means "crew cut". He is the least used of the Stormtroopers, often seen with Chibi. He is also the one who beats up Chibi the most. He is voiced by Shinji Nomura in Japanese, and Langley McArol in English.
