= Ichirō Nagai =

Japanese actor, voice actor and narrator (1931–2014)

- 永井 一郎
- Born: May 10, 1931; Ikeda, Osaka, Japan
- Died: January 27, 2014 (aged 82); Hiroshima, Japan
- Occupations: Actor; voice actor; narrator
- Years active: 1955–2014
- Agent: Aoni Production
- Notable credit(s): Sazae-san as Namihei Isono; Urusei Yatsura as Cherry; Ranma ½ as Happosai; GeGeGe no Kitarō as Konaki Jijii

Ichirō Nagai (永井 一郎, Nagai Ichirō; May 10, 1931 – January 27, 2014) was a Japanese actor, voice actor and narrator from Ikeda, Osaka.

He was previously affiliated with Tokyo Actor's Consumer's Cooperative Society, and was affiliated with Aoni Production at the time of his death.

He is best known for the roles of Namihei Isono in the long-running television anime Sazae-san, Cherry in Urusei Yatsura, Happosai in Ranma ½, and Konaki Jijii in GeGeGe no Kitarō.

== Career ==
Nagai voiced GeGeGe no Kitarō's Konaki Jijii, a comic, absent-minded old yōkai man who attacks enemies by clinging to them and turning himself to stone, increasing his weight and mass immensely and pinning them down.

In 1969, Nagai was cast as Sazae-san character Namihei Isono, Sazae's father and the patriarch of the family. He voiced the role for many years alongside co-stars Midori Katō (Sazae), Takako Sasuga (Tarao) and Miyoko Asō (Fune) until Chafurin took over the role following his death in 2014.

In 1981, he was cast in Urusei Yatsura as the wandering monk Cherry.

In 1989, he was cast in Ranma ½ as Happosai, the founder and grandmaster of Musabetsu Kakutō Ryū. He often alternates between his role as a villainous grandmaster to one as a lighthearted pervert.

== Death ==
On January 27, 2014, while recording narration for a program in Hiroshima, Nagai suffered a bout of myocardial infarction and was found by a hotel employee. He was rushed to a hospital, where he was pronounced dead; Nagai was 82 years old at the time of his death.

== Filmography ==
=== Television animation ===
Year	Title	Role	Other notes
1964	Big X	Dr. Hanamaru	
1968	Cyborg 009	Chang Changku/Cyborg 006	
1968	GeGeGe no Kitarō	Konaki Jijii	Played this role in the 70s and 80s series as well
1969–2014	Sazae-san	Namihei Isono, Umihei Isono	First voice
1972	Devilman	Alphonne Louis Steinbeck III	
1974	Great Mazinger	Spectral General Hadias	
1974	Space Battleship Yamato	Dr. Sakezo Sado	
1975	Maya the Bee	Philip	
1979	Mobile Suit Gundam	Narrator, Degwin Sodo Zabi	
1980	Astro Boy	Detective Tawashi, Ham Egg	Ham Egg in Eps 2-3
1981	Queen Millennia	Professor Amamori	
1981	Urusei Yatsura	Cherry	
1985	GeGeGe no Kitarō	Konaki Jijii	
1986	The Wonderful Wizard of Oz	Cowardly Lion	
1987	Dragon Ball	Tsuru-sen'nin, Karin	
1988	Gegege no Kitaro: Jigoku Hen	Konakii Jijii	
1989	Akuma-kun	Dr. Faust	
1989	Dragon Ball Z	Karin	
1989	Ranma ½	Happosai	
1989	Yawara!	Jigoro Inokuma	
1997	Detective Conan	Shuji Tsugawa	
1998	Master Keaton	Tahei Hiraga	
2000	Soreike! Anpanman	Furudokei-san	
2001	Detective Conan	En Kenzou	Ep. 252
2001	Pokémon	Doctor Namba	
2002	Doraemon	Principal Teraodai	Ep. 1668
2002	Lupin III: Episode 0: The First Contact	Detective George McFly	
2003	Pokémon Chronicles	Doctor Nanba	
2004	Detective Conan	Jirokichi Suzuki	
2004	Monster	Dr. Reichwein	
2006	Pokémon: Advanced	Dr. Nanba	Ep. 176
2008	Pokémon the Series: Diamond and Pearl	Dr. Nanba	Ep. 65
2009	Dragon Ball Kai	Karin	
2009	Inuyasha: The Final Act	Yōreitaisei	
2009	Hajime No Ippo: New Challenger	Ginpachi Nekota	
2011	Hunter × Hunter	Isaac Netero	Eps 6-114
2014	Dragon Ball Kai: The Final Chapters	Karin	

=== OVA ===
Year	Title	Role
1985	Vampire Hunter D	D's Left Hand
1988	Dominion Tank Police	Chief
1991	Yūkan Club	Maotai
1993	The Cockpit	Soldier Godal
2000	Grandeek	Grandeek
2010	Mobile Suit Gundam Unicorn	Syam Vist

=== Theatrical animation ===
Year	Title	Role
1979	Lupin III: The Castle of Cagliostro	Jodo
1983	Unico in the Island of Magic	Yamaneko/Melvin Magnificat
1984	Nausicaä of the Valley of the Wind	Mito
1985	GeGeGe no Kitarō	Konaki Jijii
1986	Gegege no Kitarō: Yōkai Daisensō	Konaki Jijii
1986	Gegege no Kitarō: Saikyō Yōkai Gundan! Nihon Jōriku!!	Konaki Jijii
1986	Castle in the Sky	General Muoro
1986	Gegege no Kitarō: Gekitotsu!! ljigen Yōkai no Daihanran	Konaki Jijii
1988	Dragon Ball: Mystical Adventure	Tsuru-sen'nin, Karin
1991	Dragon Ball Z: Cooler's Revenge	Karin
1995	2112: The Birth of Doraemon	Principal Teraodai
1997	The Doraemons: The Puzzling Challenge Letter of the Mysterious Thief Dorapin!	"Principal Teraodai"
1998	The Doraemons: The Great Operating of Springing Insects!	Principal Teraodai
2000	The Doraemons: Doki Doki Wildcat Engine!	Principal Teraodai
2001	Case Closed: Countdown to Heaven	Hohsui Kisaragi
2010	Detective Conan: The Lost Ship in the Sky	Jirokichi Suzuki
2009	Summer Wars	Mansuke Jinnouchi
2013	Hunter × Hunter: The Last Mission	Isaac Netero

=== Video games ===
Year	Title	Role	Notes	Source
2002	Kingdom Hearts	Philoctetes (Phil)		
2007	Final Fantasy IV Nintendo DS	Cid Pollendina		
2008	Soulcalibur IV	Yoda		
2010	Kingdom Hearts Birth by Sleep	Philoctetes, Grumpy		
2013	Dragon's Dogma: Dark Arisen	Adaro		
2015	Tales of Zestiria	Gramps		

- Dragon Ball: Origins (Karin)
- Dragon Ball: Revenge of King Piccolo (Karin)
- Dragon Ball Z: Budokai 3 (Karin)
- Dragon Ball Z: Sparking! Meteor (Korin)
- Dragon Ball Z: Sparking! Neo (Korin)
- Hunter × Hunter: Wonder Adventure (Isaac Netero)
- Jak and Daxter: The Precursor Legacy (Samos the Sage)
- Jak II (Samos the Sage)
- Kingdom Hearts II (Philoctetes)
- Kingdom Hearts Birth by Sleep (Philoctetes, Grumpy)
- Kingdom Hearts HD 1.5 Remix (Philoctetes (Phil))
- Lego Star Wars: The Complete Saga (Yoda)
- Phantasy Star Portable (Lucaim Nav)
- Phantasy Star Universe (Lucaim Nav)
- Tomba! 2: The Evil Swine Return (Kainen)

=== Tokusatsu ===
- Himitsu Sentai Gorenger (Baseball Mask)
- J.A.K.Q. Dengekitai (Devil Batter)
- Juken Sentai Gekiranger (Master Xia Fu)
- Kaizoku Sentai Gokaiger (Master Xia Fu)
  - Kaizoku Sentai Gokaiger the Movie: The Flying Ghost Ship (Baseball Mask)
- Kamen Rider G (Narrator)

=== Dubbing ===
==== Live action ====
- Michael Gambon
  - Harry Potter and the Philosopher's Stone – Albus Dumbledore
  - Harry Potter and the Prisoner of Azkaban – Albus Dumbledore
  - Harry Potter and the Goblet of Fire – Albus Dumbledore
  - Harry Potter and the Order of the Phoenix – Albus Dumbledore
  - Harry Potter and the Half-Blood Prince – Albus Dumbledore
  - Harry Potter and the Deathly Hallows – Part 1 – Albus Dumbledore
  - Harry Potter and the Deathly Hallows – Part 2 – Albus Dumbledore
- Frank Oz
  - The Empire Strikes Back (1980 Movie theater edition) – Yoda
  - The Muppet Christmas Carol – Fozzie Bear
  - Muppet Treasure Island – Fozzie Bear
  - Star Wars: Episode I – The Phantom Menace – Yoda
  - Star Wars: Episode II – Attack of the Clones – Yoda
  - Star Wars: Episode III – Revenge of the Sith – Yoda
- Walter Matthau
  - Dennis the Menace – George Wilson
  - Charade (1994 NTV edition) – Carson Dyle
  - Grumpy Old Men – Max Goldman
  - The Odd Couple II – Oscar Madison
- Arthur and the Invisibles – Archibald (Ron Crawford)
- Batteries Not Included – Frank Riley (Hume Cronyn)
- Charlie and the Chocolate Factory (2010 theatrical version) – Grandpa George (David Morris)
- Doctor Who – Charles Dickens (Simon Callow)
- Ewoks: The Battle for Endor – Noa (Wilford Brimley)
- The Fifth Element (2002 TV Asahi edition) – Father Vito Cornelius (Ian Holm)
- Freaky Friday – Alan Coleman (Harold Gould)
- Harry Potter and the Philosopher's Stone – Albus Dumbledore (Richard Harris)
- Harry Potter and the Chamber of Secrets – Albus Dumbledore (Richard Harris)
- The Holiday – Arthur Abbott (Eli Wallach)
- Independence Day – Julius Levinson (Judd Hirsch)
- Journey 2: The Mysterious Island – Alexander Anderson (Michael Caine)
- Jurassic Park – John Hammond (Richard Attenborough)
- The Lost World: Jurassic Park – John Hammond (Richard Attenborough)
- L.A. Confidential – Sid Hudgens (Danny DeVito)
- Lassie – The Duke of Rudling (Peter O'Toole)
- Lawrence of Arabia (2000 TV Tokyo edition) – Mr. Dryden (Claude Rains)
- Little Nicky – Mr. Beefy (Robert Smigel)
- Mad Max Beyond Thunderdome (1988 Fuji TV edition) – Master (Angelo Rossitto)
- The Muppet Movie – Rowlf the Dog
- Night at the Museum – Gus (Mickey Rooney)
- Rawhide – George Washington Wishbone (Paul Brinegar)
- Scanners (1987 NTV edition) – Dr. Paul Ruth (Patrick McGoohan)
- The Sound of Music – Max Detweiler (Richard Haydn)
- The Sting – J.J. Singleton (Ray Walston)

==== Animation ====
- The Black Cauldron – King Eidilleg
- Galaxy High School – Professor Icenstein
- The Great Mouse Detective – Dr. Dawson
- Hercules – Philoctetes
- Home on the Range – Rusty
- The Jetsons – Cosmo Spacely (first voice)
- Lady and the Tramp – Toughy
- Legend of the Guardians: The Owls of Ga'Hoole – Ezylryb
- Looney Tunes series – Yosemite Sam (first voice)
- Magic Adventures of Mumfie – Napoleon Jones
- Star Wars: Clone Wars – Yoda
- Star Wars: The Clone Wars (film) – Yoda
- Star Wars: The Clone Wars (TV) – Yoda
- Tintin and the Lake of Sharks – Thomson and Thompson
- Tintin and the Temple of the Sun – Thomson and Thompson
- Toy Story – Slinky Dog
- Toy Story 2 – Slinky Dog
- Toy Story 3 – Slinky Dog
- Watership Down – Black Rabbit
