= Lum (Urusei Yatsura) =

Fictional character from Urusei Yatsura

Lum the Invader Girl
- Urusei Yatsura character
- Lum, as depicted in a promotional artwork for the 2022 Urusei Yatsura TV series
- First appearance: Urusei Yatsura chapter #1: Young Love on the Run, September 24, 1978 (Weekly Shōnen Sunday 1978 #39)
- Created by: Rumiko Takahashi
- Voiced by: Japanese: Fumi Hirano (1981–2008); Sumire Uesaka (2022–present); English: Martha Ellen Senseney (AnimEigo dub; 1995); Anna Friel (BBC Choice dub; 2000); Shannon Settlemyre (movies 1, 3–6; 2003–2005); Ann Ulrey (Beautiful Dreamer; 1996); Claudia Thompson (Animax dub; 2000s); Jade Kelly (Sentai Filmworks dub; 2023)

In-universe information
- Species: Alien Oni
- Relatives: Ten (cousin); Ataru Moroboshi (fiancé)

Lum the Invader Girl (/lʌm/), known in Japan simply as Lum (Japanese: ラム, Hepburn: Ramu), and sometimes known as Lum Invader, is a fictional character and the female protagonist of Rumiko Takahashi's manga series Urusei Yatsura. She is often believed to be the main protagonist of the series due to her iconic status. However, Takahashi has stated that Ataru Moroboshi is the main character.

She is named Lamu in Animax's English-language dub of the series, and in the Italian and French anime dubs as well; however she is still called "Lum" in the Spanish anime dub. Her name is thought to come from popular 1970s swimsuit model Agnes Lum, as well as Rumiko Takahashi's nickname of "Rum" or "Lum" (from the interchangeable sound of the Rs and Ls in Japanese).

Lum is considered a magical girlfriend, though significantly different from others such as Belldandy of Oh! My Goddess and Ai of Video Girl Ai. While the latter two are openly considered "ideal" women by the protagonists of their respective series, Ataru often indicates publicly that Lum is the opposite of ideal.

== Creation and conception ==
Lum was created by Rumiko Takahashi for a short story she was working on before her professional debut. She worked meticulously on designing her hairstyle and body shape. However, the outspoken and uninhibited Lum is the author's polar opposite. This proved to Takahashi that she could draw characters who do not reflect herself at all.

== Appearances ==
=== In Urusei Yatsura ===
Lum is royalty and the daughter of the alien Invader called oni and can fly and generate massive electrical discharges. She generally wears a tiger-striped bikini and go-go boots that highlight her shapely, voluptuous figure, and has two tiny horns on her head that, when sprayed with a special solution, can be shaped to resemble barrettes. When these horns are removed (or when specially blessed yellow ribbons are tied around them), her electric and flying abilities disappear and she becomes a regular girl. Her hair color was originally iridescent and ever-changing in the manga; due to difficulties in making such an effect possible when the anime was originally produced, Lum's hair was given the shade of cyan it is best known for. Lum's appearance and clothing (and that of her family) draw heavily on the Japanese god of thunder, Raijin.

She grew up on her homeworld, Oniboshi ("planet of the oni"), a precocious girl. She attended primary school with Benten of the rivals of the oni: the Lucky Gods, Oyuki, the ice princess, and Ran. There, the four of them developed a reputation for causing massive amounts of trouble. Ran often got roped into their mischief and took all the blame, while Lum got off unharmed, leading Ran to seek revenge. Lum, Benten, and Oyuki's reputation grew in junior high school, and they became a school gang. Lum later got engaged to a handsome oni named Rei but rejected him because of his dullness.

Some time afterward, the oni attempted to invade the Earth, an event that would change her life forever. That day, Lum met Ataru Moroboshi for the first time. He had been randomly selected by computer to face her in a game of tag with the fate of the earth on the line. Ataru had been promised marriage by his then-girlfriend Shinobu Miyake if he could win, which spurred him to success, but upon catching Lum, he declared, "Now I can get married!" Lum misinterpreted this as a proposal to herself and accepted it. Because engagements are sacred on her planet, she is determined to be married to Ataru for the rest of her life. Since then, she has forced her way into his life as his "loving wife," much to his chagrin because it compromised his ability to flirt. The relationship between Lum and Ataru has been called "a humorously exaggerated parody of a common Japanese husband and wife dynamic."

=== In other franchises ===
In the manga series Detective Conan, Lum makes a cameo appearance when Conan Edogawa asks Ai Haibara about her knowing about a Black Organization member named "Rum", and Haibara's first reaction is to think of Lum, due to the use of the syllable "ra" for the Japanese spelling of both names. Likewise, Kanenori Wakita's codename as a member of the Black Organization, "Rum", is used as an injoke by Gosho Aoyama in relation to Lum. Also, the character Rumi Wakasa, who is a "Rum" suspect, shares the same voice actress as Lum in the Detective Conan anime adaptation.

== Characterization ==
=== Personality ===
Because of her exotic beauty, Lum has become extremely popular with the boys at Tomobiki High School. Despite this, she refutes all of their advances since she is devoted to Ataru. Most of the time, she is very laid back, enjoying the quirks and perks of life on Earth. But she is quick to anger and responds with powerful electric discharges to anyone who enrages her, usually Ataru or any person who attacks or insults her "Darling". Once the threat passes, Lum reverts to her usual cheery attitude.

Lum is very intelligent, but very naive about life on earth, with a worldview comparable to that of a kindergartener. She does not understand why the other boys at school feel that the philandering Ataru is not good enough for her, but she cares about their well-being. She has successfully adapted herself to life on Earth thanks to her technology. She still struggles to keep her younger cousin Ten from wreaking havoc thanks to his own naiveté about human behavior. For the most part, however, people who look at her for the first time view her as a highly attractive schoolgirl, despite her obviously different appearance. She has the qualities of the ideal wife and daughter-in-law in Japanese society as she takes good care of her darling and she helps her "mother-in-law" with the housework whenever she is free.

Lum is well-versed in the use of technology, and carries a variety of advanced gadgets from her society with her, with the stranger gadgets hidden in her bikini top. But while her intentions in operating them are often noble, such as copying a notebook to help Ataru study for an exam, the results are rarely what Lum intends. This may be in part because she is naive regarding the customs of Earth, so she often misunderstands what people say. The best example of this is her innocent misinterpretation of Ataru's victory yell after he defeated her in tag. She believed it to be an instant marriage, rather than a proposal, or even just the celebratory shout it really was.

She drinks Tabasco sauce as if it were water and the food she cooks is violently spicy. It does not stop her from trying to prepare edible victuals, and she enjoys preparing food for Ataru, who angers her by refusing to consume it for fear of burning his tongue. Eating umeboshi causes her to get drunk and she dislikes garlic. Despite efforts from everybody she knows to convince her otherwise, her love for Ataru remains unchanged because he has consistently proven that he genuinely cares for her well-being in spite of his idiotic facade. These events have convinced Lum that Ataru is indeed the right man for her. However, while Ataru deeply cares for her, most of their friction stems from their clashing personalities: while Lum is naive and fundamentally innocent, she strives to act as the ideal, mature wife and daughter-in-law for Ataru and his family. On the other hand, Ataru is savvier and well-versed in Earth customs, but he insists to act as a carefree teen, making Lum doubt his commitment.

=== Relationship with Ataru ===
Lum has fallen completely in love with Ataru, and refers to him only as "Darling" (ダーリン, Dārin). Since she considers him to be her husband, she violently electrocutes him whenever he looks at or flirts with another girl (or if he insults her or does something to make her unhappy), but always forgives him in the end (she electrocutes him less frequently as the series progresses). Though Lum knows that Ataru cares deeply for her on the inside, she wishes that he would show it more often than he does. Many of the gadgets she keeps in her UFO and her bikini top are designed to meet this end by making him more faithful to her.

At the beginning of the series, she constantly hugs and kisses Ataru, whether he wants it or not, often infuriating Shinobu (who still initially had feelings for Ataru, though she eventually gave up on him) and the rest of the class. But by the end, Lum has calmed down considerably and simply holds onto his arm whenever they are walking somewhere. She is usually together with Ataru and does almost everything with him, whether eating lunch, going to and from school, or going to a festival. She even enrolled herself in Tomobiki High to spend more time with him, which initially caused her Darling to faint from the shock. Lum has come to consider and treat his room as her home, though Ataru insists she sleeps in the closet. Takahashi's reason for this is that she believes two high school students shouldn't be sleeping together. Lum did try to get Ataru to sleep with her in early manga chapters and anime episodes (and also spread a rumor that she and Ataru were sleeping together and that she was pregnant with his child, which was designed to make Shinobu angry at Ataru), but Ataru flatly refused. In one episode, she does share Ataru's bed, but only after fitting him in a bulky insulated suit to protect him from accidental electric shocks in her sleep.

Lum is considered the embodiment of modern Japanese women's struggle: how to be independent and still fulfill the traditional role of loving wife and mother. While she is very independent-minded, she continues to be supportive and caring of Ataru no matter what happens throughout the series. Lum's relationship with Shinobu was initially very stormy, as Lum considered Shinobu to be Ataru's "mistress" and went to extraordinary lengths to disrupt the relationship between Ataru and Shinobu (including using her UFOs to jam Ataru and Shinobu's telephone calls and claiming that she was pregnant with Ataru's child). Eventually, Shinobu realizes that Ataru really does love Lum and gives up on Ataru (eventually finding love with Inaba), and her and Lum's mutual hatred cools down into a somewhat terse friendship, though the two never do become close. Although Lum sees Mendou and Megane and his gang (Lum's Stormtroopers) as good friends and values their company, she does not return the affection they have for her, and makes it clear that she loves only her "Darling."

=== Speech ===
Lum refers to herself in the first person as "uchi" (うち), which is a trait of the western Japanese dialects including the Kansai dialect, and is famous for usually ending her sentences with "~daccha" (～だっちゃ) or simply "~ccha" (～っちゃ), which is a trait of the Sendai dialect. When used by itself, "daccha" means "Yes". This speech type is a rather saccharine, "cute" type of speech. A similar speech pattern appears in Takahashi's debut work Katte na Yatsura (勝手なやつら), where the dappyamen (だっぴゃ星人, dappya seijin) add "dappya" (だっぴゃ) at the end of all of their sentences.

AnimEigo's English dub of the first two episodes of the TV series, Those Obnoxious Aliens, attempted to approximate Lum's "daccha" speech pattern with "icha," which in English means nothing. None of the other American- or British-made dubs of Urusei Yatsura TV episodes or movies have tried a similar English approximation of "daccha."

== Reception ==
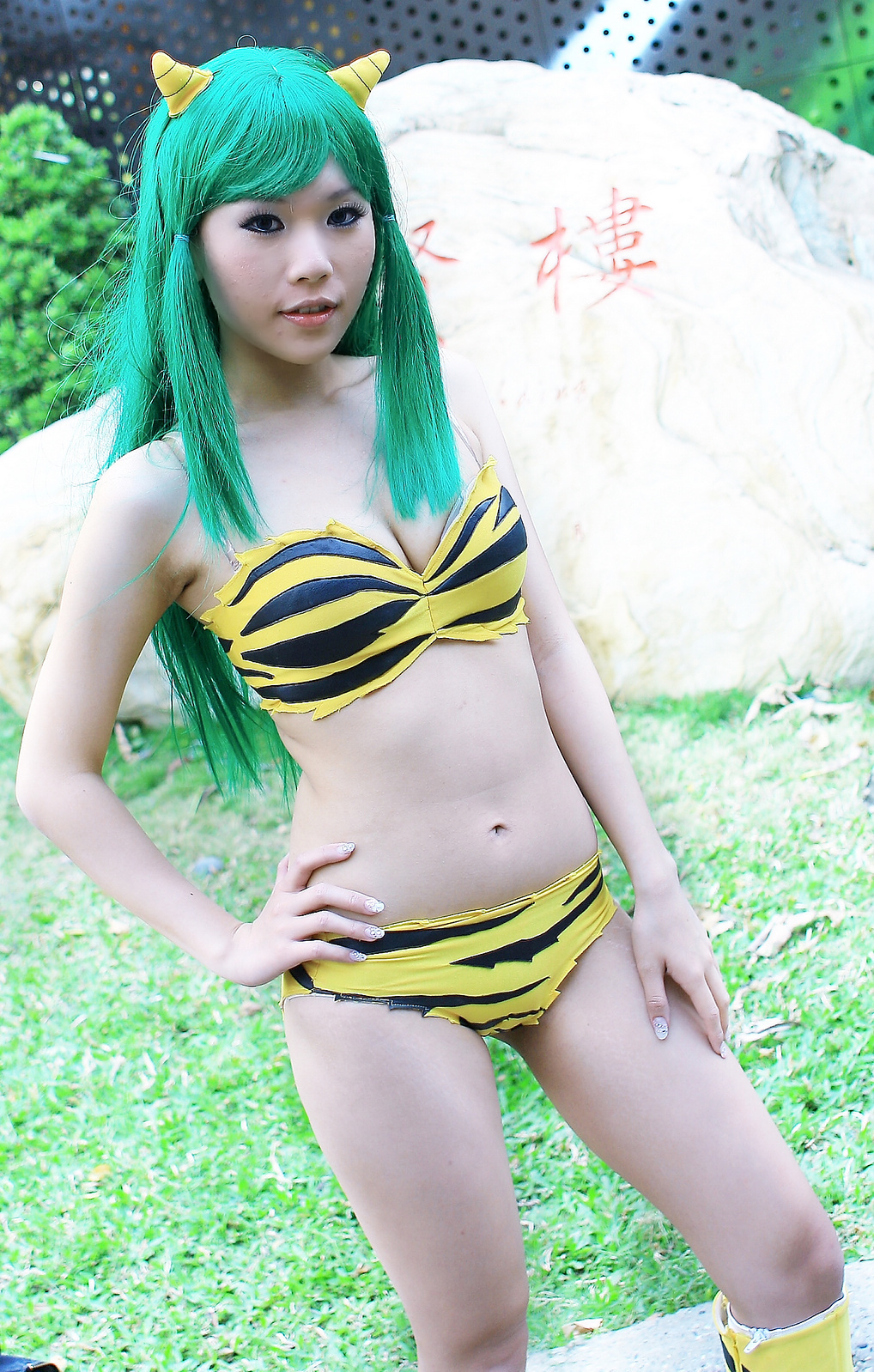
A cosplayer dressed as Lum

Lum is a well-known and popular character in Japan, and has been described as "the original Otaku dream girl". On April 4, 1982, Lum and other characters from Urusei Yatsura appeared in two public service announcements for the Kansai Electric Power Company regarding being careful with kites and koinobori around electrical lines. Fumi Hirano, the voice actress of Lum, did the main voiceovers for the commercials.

Merchandise featuring Lum continues to be popular, and her image appears on a wide variety of printed, commercial, and electronic media. Over four decades after the character's introduction in 1978, pachinko machines featuring Lum are still being made. Lum also appeared wearing a Hanshin Tigers uniform in a series of numbered collector covers of the Daily Sports (a daily sports newspaper published in Japan) from 2003 to 2009. Comiket organizer Koichi Ichikawa has described Lum as being both the source of moe and the first tsundere, a character which alternates between being harsh and being loving. Bome, a sculptor of anime-style figurines, felt that Lum was the first female lead character in a work published on a shōnen magazine, and was inspired by Lum to create a line of "oni-musume" (she-devil) figurines.

In the 6th edition in 1983 of the Anime Grand Prix, Lum was ranked second place behind Misa Hayase from Super Dimension Fortress Macross. Matthew Sweet introduced many people in the United States to Lum through clips in his music video "I've Been Waiting". Sweet also has a tattoo of Lum.

== See also ==
- List of Urusei Yatsura characters
