= Ataru Moroboshi =

Fictional character from Urusei Yatsura

- Urusei Yatsura character
- Ataru, as depicted in a promotional artwork for the 2022 Urusei Yatsura TV series
- First appearance: Urusei Yatsura chapter #1: Young Love on the Run, September 24, 1978 (Weekly Shōnen Sunday 1978 #39)
- Created by: Rumiko Takahashi
- Voiced by: Japanese: Toshio Furukawa (1981–2008); Hiroshi Kamiya (2022–present); English: Michael Sinterniklaas (Animeigo dub; 1995); Matt Lucas (BBC Choice dub; 2000); Steve Rassin (movies 1, 3–6; 2003–2005); Vinnie Penna (Beautiful Dreamer; 1996); Nathan Wilson (Sentai dub; 2022 series)

In-universe information
- Relatives: Lum (fiancée)

Ataru Moroboshi (Japanese: 諸星 あたる, Hepburn: Moroboshi Ataru) is a fictional character and the main protagonist of Rumiko Takahashi's manga and anime series Urusei Yatsura.

== Appearances ==
=== In Urusei Yatsura ===
Ataru is a 17-year-old student at Tomobiki High School, Class 2–4. Born during a major earthquake in April (the fourth month, an unlucky number in East Asian culture) on Friday the 13th (the latter an unlucky number in Western cultures), and on Butsumetsu (the unluckiest day of the Buddhist calendar, said to be the day when Buddha died), he is extremely unlucky and draws to himself a near-unending number of unfortunate events, evil spirits, aliens, and other supernatural phenomena, often affecting those around him. Due to his incredible misfortune, he is considered the bane of Tomobiki by its residents and even his own parents.

An extremely lecherous and tenacious womanizer, Ataru spends most of the manga hopelessly chasing the various women who cross his path in an endeavour to achieve his dream of becoming the master of a harem of exotic and beautiful women, often competing with love rivals such as Shutaro Mendou, though Ataru's advances are almost always rejected.

At the start of the manga, Ataru learns from an alien invader that he has been randomly selected by a computer to represent humanity in a game of tag with the Oni-themed bikini-clad alien princess Lum to decide the fate of the Earth, needing to grab one of her horns to win. Though he is unable to catch Lum due to her power to fly (only managing to steal her bikini top), he finds newfound motivation after Shinobu Miyake, his childhood friend and classmate in classes 2–4, promises to marry him if he wins. On the final day of the contest, he manages to catch Lum by luring her with her stolen bikini top. In his triumph, he declares his desire to marry Shinobu—Lum mistakenly interprets this as a marriage proposal to herself and she immediately accepts, much to Ataru's chagrin.

For the rest of the series, Ataru continues to pursue the love of women, both human and extraterrestrial, much to the strain of his relationship with Lum, who, ironically, seems to love Ataru unconditionally. When confronted, he denies that he has any sort of relationship with Lum, turning down her advances and even pursuing other women in front of her, though he does care for Lum and slowly warms up to her over the course of the manga.

== Personality ==
Ataru is a 17-year-old student at Tomobiki High School, Class 2–4. He is very lecherous and irreverent, and often tries to escape from his classwork due to laziness. Whenever he sees or hears a pretty girl, he immediately asks for her address and telephone number, but never succeeds. He chases after and tries to grope every woman, except his "wife" Lum, no matter what the situation. However, it is revealed on several occasions that she is the only one he actually loves which he vehemently denies at any opportunity. Despite this, he typically treats her like a nuisance and constantly disobeys her. Perhaps as a form of irony, he is rather prudish about other matters, becoming hypocritically outraged at the idea of his mom having an affair with Rei. Despite his behaviour towards women, he is remarkably chivalrous at other times claiming that if he hurt so much as one woman, he couldn't call himself a man, something which the girls in his class all acknowledge.

Despite how stupid he seems, Ataru often displays remarkable intelligence, particularly when escaping from Lum. At times he appears to be superhuman, with the durability of a cockroach and the rejuvenation of a lizard, possessing remarkable tenacity for a boy of his age and physique when trying to achieve something. As a result, he never gives up on his girl hunting, no matter how many times he fails or how badly Lum shocks him. Ataru is also very fast, and can often be seen wearing a track uniform. This blinding speed comes in handy when escaping from Lum.

Ataru has occasionally let his good side shine through, most notably when he took care of the class caterpillar everyone else hated it, and when he went on a date with the ghost of a sick girl who had admired him from afar. But because of his reputation as a lecherous idiot, most of the cast is surprised whenever he does such a thing, believing that something is wrong with him. Actions like these, however, reveal his true personality, which may be the reason Lum fell in love with him despite his many flaws.

A running gag throughout the series due to the fact that none of the cast has any respect for him. They will automatically believe he is the reason Lum is upset or has left for a period of time, despite the fact he had absolutely nothing to do with it.

== Relationship with Lum ==
In the beginning of the series, he is coldhearted towards Lum and sees her as an obstacle to his girl hunting, but by the time of the story "A Night Alone" (夜を二人で!!, Yoru wo Futari de!!) (Vol. 18), he was completely alright sharing a bed with her. Though he may seem to disregard Lum, it is clear she is the only one he truly cares for, which she is grateful for and just wishes he would show more often.

In the story "The Glove of Love and Conflict" (愛と闘魂のグローブ, Ai to Tokon no Gurōbu) (Vol. 21), in which he accidentally wears boxing gloves that force him to grab and punch anyone who gets close enough to him, he continuously puts his own face in front of Lum's each time she gets too close, punching himself instead. This is just one of many instances when Ataru does everything he can to protect Lum from physical harm.

When faced with the prospect of losing Lum, Ataru goes all-out to try to prevent it from happening, even at the expense of his own health. In the story introducing Inaba near the end of the series, he decides to protect the future where he and Lum are married after he sees her happiness in that future. In Ataru's own ideal future, he had a harem containing every prominent female in the cast, but decided to abandon it after he seeing Lum would not be with him, further signifying the love he has for her. When she leaves for an extended period of time, he becomes very depressed and lonely in her absence. Once such dangers have passed, he goes back to his girl hunts as though nothing had happened. Even so, the fact that he sacrifices himself to rescue Lum is enough to prove he truly cares. As highlighted in the final story arc, where even faced with the prospect of losing Lum and all his memories of her, he refuses to give in to her request of a proper love declaration.

Most of the friction between Lum and Ataru stems from their clashing personalities: while Lum is utterly naïve and innocent of Earth customs and uses, but still truly wishes to be a proper and mature wife for Ataru and a prim daughter-in-law for his family, Ataru is more worldly, yet prefers to act as a flirty, happy-go-lucky teen, making Lum doubt of his commitment.

== Special skills ==
Ataru can catch a katana blade with his bare hands, which he taught himself this to deal with Shuutaro Mendou, who often uses such a sword and swings it at him when insulted. He also learned how to counter Ten's fire breath with a frying pan. At times, (mostly involving fights with Mendou) Ataru has demonstrated knowledge with some ninja abilities—one such skill is the Kawarimi no Jutsu ("Body Replacement Technique"). Another worthy note is his speed when properly motivated (a cute girl insight or promises of special service from a girl); in the anime, Ataru has been seen (whether for comedic or serious purposes) to outrun a jet, and even Superman himself. Ataru also appears to have a good knowledge of the human body and its nerve points; in "The Final Chapter" movie, when Carla attempted to use her trademark bazooka, Ataru "poked" her on a part of her back and caused her to spasm and lose control of her weapon, firing it randomly. In "Beautiful Dreamer", Ataru was able to escape Mujaki's dream trap where the priestess Sakura failed. In the sixth feature, "Always, My Darling", Ataru was able to pass traps similar to the ones of Indiana Jones and the Last Crusade through the use of his lecherous sixth sense. Also, the film showed his ability to draw out his h-chi/h-ki (hentai chi/ki) to create a powerful lust aura similar to that of Happosai from Ranma ½. In the series, there was a time (through Ten's idiot ideas) when Sakura was haunted by a dream Ataru had originally made for Lum. In the dreamworld, where one's power is only limited to one's imagination, Ataru demonstrated powers similar to Neo from The Matrix including stopping projectiles with a wave of his hand. He is also able to escape from restraints and exploit other characters' weaknesses, such as Rei's gluttony and Mendou's fear of the dark.

== Name meaning ==
- Ataru's full name translates as, "to be struck by a falling star.” His surname is broken into various (諸, moro; kun'yomi and nanori reading) and star (星, hoshi; boshi after rendaku), while his given name comes from to hit, be correct (当たる, ataru).
- His name features as a pun in the second eyecatch of the 1980s animated series, which shows Ataru being hit by the character in "Urusei Yatsura" (うる星やつら), driving him neck-deep into the ground. Helen McCarthy describes his "curse and blessing" in gaining Lum's love as being akin to being struck by a falling star.

== Other voice actors ==
English

- Matt Lucas (dub for BBC Three)
- Steve Rassin (movies 1, 3, 4, 5, and 6 dubs)
- Vinnie Penna (movie 2 dub)
- Michael Sinterniklaas (TV Series Episode 1–2)

Castilian Spanish

- Rais David Báscones

Italian

- Riccardo Rossi (first Italian)
- Massimo Còrizza (second Italian)
- Alessandro Tiberi (third Italian)

== Reception ==
Gilles Poitras has compared Ataru to Ryō Saeba from Tsukasa Hōjō's City Hunter manga and anime series, stating that "Ryo Saeba can best be described as what would happen if Ataru grew up to be handsome, physically fit, a crack shot with any given firearm and a hotshot gun for hire in Tokyo." Ataru was ranked third in Mania Entertainment's 10 Most Iconic Anime Heroes written by Thomas Zoth who commented that "Against all odds, he finds himself the target of affection of beautiful, powerful women, making him the first protagonist with a harem."

== See also ==
- List of Urusei Yatsura characters
