= Urusei Yatsura =

Japanese manga series and franchise

- First tankōbon volume cover, featuring Lum (front) and Ataru Moroboshi (back)

うる星やつら
- Genre: Romantic comedy; Science fiction
- Manga
- Written by: Rumiko Takahashi
- Published by: Shogakukan
- English publisher: NA: Viz Media
- Imprint: Shōnen Sunday Comics
- Magazine: Weekly Shōnen Sunday
- English magazine: NA: Animerica
- Original run: August 30, 1978 – January 21, 1987
- Volumes: 34
- Anime television series
- 1981 TV series; 2022 TV series
- Other media
- List of Urusei Yatsura films; List of Urusei Yatsura OVAs
- icon

Urusei Yatsura (うる星やつら) (Note: The title of the series is an untranslatable pun, from うるさい (urusai, "annoying; noisy"), 星 (-sei, "[the] planet [known as]", and やつら (yatsura, "those guys"). It can be translated roughly into English as "Those Obnoxious Aliens".) is a Japanese manga series written and illustrated by Rumiko Takahashi. It was serialized in Shogakukan's Weekly Shōnen Sunday from August 1978 to January 1987. Its 366 individual chapters were collected in 34 tankōbon volumes. It tells the story of Ataru Moroboshi, and the alien Lum, who believes she is Ataru's wife after he accidentally proposes to her. The series makes heavy use of Japanese mythology, culture, and puns. It was adapted into two anime television series that aired on Fuji TV affiliates.

The manga series was republished in different formats in Japan. Viz Media released the series in North America in the 1990s under the names Lum * Urusei Yatsura and The Return of Lum, but dropped it after nine volumes. The company re-licensed the manga and released an omnibus edition under its original title with new translations from 2019 to 2023. The first television series, produced by Kitty Films, was broadcast from October 1981 to March 1986, with 194 half-hour episodes. Twelve OVAs and six theatrical films followed, and the series was released on various home video formats. A second anime television series adaptation of 46 episodes produced by David Production aired on the Noitamina programming block from October 2022 to June 2024. It is licensed by Sentai Filmworks and is streamed on Hidive.

The original television series, OVAs, and five of the films were released in North America with English subtitles, as well as a dub for the films by AnimEigo. They provided extensive notes on the series to allow people to understand the many cultural references and jokes in the series that would not normally be understood by non-Japanese. The remaining film, Beautiful Dreamer, was released bilingually by Central Park Media. Five of the films, as well as the OVAs, are available from MVM Films in the United Kingdom. The series was released on television in Southeast Asia as Lamu the Invader Girl. The series and films have been license rescued by Discotek Media for a Blu-ray release.

Urusei Yatsura launched Takahashi's career and received positive reception in and out of Japan from fans and critics alike. The manga has over 35 million copies in circulation, making it one of the best-selling manga series of all time. In 1980, it received the 26th Shogakukan Manga Award in the shōnen category, as well as the 18th Seiun Award for the Best Comic category in 1987.

== Plot ==
An alien race known as the Oni arrive on Earth to invade it. Instead of taking over the planet by force, the Oni give humans a chance to fight for the rights to the planet by taking part in a competition. The competition is a variant of the game of tag (known as "the game of the Oni" in Japanese), in which the human player must touch the horns on the head of the Oni player within one week. The computer-selected human player is Ataru Moroboshi, a lecherous, unlucky and academically unsuccessful high school student from the fictional Tomobiki Town (友引町, Tomobiki-chō) in Nerima, Japan, and the Oni player is Lum, daughter of the leader of the alien invaders. Despite his initial reluctance to take part in the competition, Ataru becomes interested in the game when he meets Lum. When the competition begins, Lum surprises everyone by flying away and Ataru finds himself unable to catch her. Before the last day of the competition, Ataru's girlfriend Shinobu Miyake encourages Ataru by pledging to marry him if he wins. On the final day of the competition, Ataru wins the game by stealing Lum's bikini top, which prevents her from protecting her horns in favor of protecting her modesty. In celebrating his victory, Ataru expresses his joy at being able to get married; however, Lum misinterprets this as a proposal from Ataru and accepts on the competition's worldwide live television broadcast. Despite the misunderstanding, Lum falls in love with Ataru and moves into his house.

Despite Ataru's lack of interest in Lum and attempts to rekindle his relationship with Shinobu, Lum frequently interferes and Shinobu loses interest in Ataru. Still, Ataru's flirtatious nature persists despite Lum's attention. Lum attempts to stop him from flirting, which results in Ataru receiving powerful electric shock attacks from Lum as punishment. Two characteristics of Ataru are particularly strong: his pervertedness and his bad luck that draws to him all bizarre residents of the planet, the spirit world and even the galaxy. Later Lum begins attending the same school as Ataru despite his objections. Lum develops a fan base of admirers among the boys of the school, including Shutaro Mendo, the rich and handsome heir to a large corporation that all the girls from Tomobiki have a crush on. Despite their romantic interest, none of Lum's admirers will risk upsetting Lum by trying to force her and Ataru apart, although this does not stop them from trying to get Ataru punished due to his bad behavior, and interfering every time the two get close.

== Production ==
In 1977, Rumiko Takahashi created the short story "Those Selfish Aliens", which was nominated for Shogakukan's Best New Comic Artist award. This served as the basis for creating Urusei Yatsura, which was first published a year later when Takahashi was 20 years old. The series was her first major work, having previously only published short stories, and is a combination of romantic comedy, science fiction, suburban life, and Japanese folktales. The title of the series is an untranslatable pun on the word urusai (うるさい), meaning "noisy" or "obnoxious", but written with the kanji for "planet"; the title can be translated roughly into English as "Those Obnoxious Aliens". The series first appeared in Shogakukan's Weekly Shonen Sunday in September 1978. At the start of the series it was only scheduled to run for five chapters. Ataru was the central character and each chapter would feature a different strange character. The character of Lum was only going to appear in the first chapter and was not in the second chapter; however, Takahashi decided to re-include her in the third chapter. The series was not an instant success and chapters were initially published sporadically due to Takahashi still being in university at the time. Between May and September 1978 she simultaneously worked on a series called Dust Spot; however, the increasing popularity of Urusei Yatsura caused her to focus on Urusei and the series became a regular serialization from the middle of 1979.

Takahashi said that she had been dreaming about the overall universe of Urusei Yatsura since she was very young. She said that the series "really includes everything I ever wanted to do. I love science fiction because sci-fi has tremendous flexibility. I adopted the science fiction–style for the series because then I could write any way I wanted to". She wanted the reader to be completely surprised by the next panel and used slapstick comedy to create a reaction in the reader. When Takahashi ran out of ideas she would create new characters. Takahashi shared a small 150-square-foot (14 m^{2}) apartment with her assistants, and slept in a closet due to a lack of space. While writing Urusei Yatsura she also began work on Maison Ikkoku and used this experience as well as her university experience as the basis for the setting of that series. Character names often carry extra meanings used to describe a characters personality or other traits. For example, the name Ataru Moroboshi refers to being hit by a star, a reference to the aliens and other people who gather around him. The name Shinobu suggests a patient character; however, this in contrast to the character's actual personality. In a similar way, the setting for the series is "Tomobiki", which means "friend taking". Tomobiki is also the name of a superstitious day in the old Japanese calendar system considered to have "no winners or losers" and occurred on every sixth day. Funerals rarely took place on this day as it was believed more deaths would soon follow. Lum was named after Agnes Lum, a bikini model during the 1970s. Lum's use of the English word "Darling" in reference to Ataru was to emphasize her status as a foreigner, as well as a play on the name Darrin, the husband figure from Bewitched.

The characters of Megane, Perm, Kakugari and Chibi are recurring characters throughout the first anime adaptation; however, in the manga they are nameless fans of Lum who appear less after Mendo is introduced. In contrast the character Kosuke Shirai plays a large role in the manga, but does not appear in the first anime series. His role is often performed by Perm. The second half of the first anime adaptation is closer to the manga than the first half. In 2022, Takahashi said that Urusei Yatsura ended because she saw that Shinobu was happy after the character Inaba had been introduced. Takahashi has stated that she will not produce any more content for the series.

== Media ==
=== Manga ===
Written and illustrated by Rumiko Takahashi, Urusei Yatsura began sporadic serialization on August 30, 1978, in that year's 39th issue of Shogakukan's anthology magazine Weekly Shōnen Sunday until the middle of 1979 when it became a regular serialization. It ended in 1987's eighth issue on January 21, after publishing 366 chapters and almost 6,000 pages. A total of 34 individual volumes with 11 chapters each were released in tankōbon format between 1980 and March 1987. After the tenth anniversary of start of the series, it was printed in 15 wideban editions between July 1989 and August 1990. Each volume contained around 25 chapters, and were printed on higher-quality paper, with new inserts. A bunkoban edition of the series was released over 17 volumes between August 1998 and December 1999. Each volume contains forewords by other manga creators discussing the influence the series had on them. A "My First Big" edition was printed between July 2000 and September 2004. This edition was similar to the tankōbon but used low-quality paper and were sold at a low price. A shinsoban edition over 34 volumes was released between November 17, 2006, and March 18, 2008. This edition was also similar to the tankōbon but used new cover artwork and included a section that displayed artwork from current manga artists.

After requests from fans, Viz Media licensed the series for release in English across North America under the title of Lum * Urusei Yatsura. Despite a strong start, the series was dropped after eight issues. The series was then reintroduced in the monthly Viz publication Animerica and because of the long gap the series was retitled The Return of Lum. To start, chapters were published monthly in Animerica; however, due to reader feedback and an increased popularity of the series it was decided to release it as an individual monthly publication. The English release finished in 1998 and is now out of print. The first 11 volumes of the Japanese release were covered, but several chapters were excluded and a total nine English volumes of the series were released.

On July 19, 2018, Viz announced that it had re-licensed the manga with plans to release it in a two-in-one omnibus edition with new translations. Based on the Japanese shinsoban, the first volume was published on February 19, 2019, and the seventeenth and last on February 19, 2023.

=== Anime ===
Series	Season	Segments	Episodes	Originally released		
Series	Season	Segments	Episodes	First released	Last released	Network
Urusei Yatsura	1	73	54	October 14, 1981	December 22, 1982	Fuji TV
Urusei Yatsura	2	—N/a	52	January 5, 1983	March 28, 1984	Fuji TV
Urusei Yatsura	3	—N/a	43	April 11, 1984	March 27, 1985	Fuji TV
Urusei Yatsura	4	—N/a	45	April 3, 1985	March 19, 1986	Fuji TV
Urusei Yatsura	1	45	23	October 14, 2022	March 24, 2023	Fuji TV (noitaminA)
Urusei Yatsura	2	38	23	January 12, 2024	June 21, 2024	Fuji TV (noitaminA)

The series was adapted by Kitty Films into an animated television series that aired on Fuji TV from October 14, 1981, to March 19, 1986. The first-season episodes would often consist of two fifteen-minute stories per episode, making a total of 194 episodes with 213 stories. The first 106 episodes were directed by Mamoru Oshii and the remainder by Kazuo Yamazaki. Six opening theme songs and nine closing themes were used during the series.

On December 10, 1983, the first VHS release of the series was made available in Japan. The series was also released on fifty LaserDiscs. Another VHS release across fifty cassettes began on March 17, 1998, and concluded on April 19, 2000. Two DVD box sets of the series were released between December 8, 2000, and March 9, 2001. These were followed by fifty individual volumes between August 24, 2001, and August 23, 2002. To celebrate the 35th anniversary of the anime a new HD transfer was created and released on Blu-ray in Japan. The first Blu-ray box set of the series was released on March 27, 2013, with the fourth box set released on March 26, 2014. To promote the Blu-ray, the anime was rebroadcast in high definition on Kids Station.

During 1992, the series was licensed for a North American release by AnimEigo. Their VHS release began in October of the same year and was among the first anime titles to receive a subtitled North American release. However, the release schedule was erratic. The episodes were also released on LaserDisc in 1993. The first two episodes were released with an English dub on March 29, 1995, as Those Obnoxious Aliens. Anime Projects released the series in the United Kingdom from April 25, 1994. AnimEigo later released the series on DVD. The series was available in box set format as well as individual releases. A total of 10 box sets and 50 individual DVDs were released between March 27, 2001, and June 20, 2006. Each DVD and VHS contained Liner notes explaining the cultural references and puns from the series. A fan group known as "Lum's Stormtroopers" convinced the Californian public television station KTEH to broadcast subtitled episodes of the series in 1998. AnimeEigo's license later expired, and has confirmed that the series is out of print as of September 2011. An improvisational dub of the first and third episodes was broadcast on BBC Choice in 2000 as part of a "Japan Night" special as Lum the Invader Girl. During their panel at Otakon 2022, Discotek Media announced that they licensed the anime series.

On January 1, 2022, a second television series adaptation was announced and premiered on Fuji TV's Noitamina programming block on October 14, 2022. The series is produced by David Production and directed by Takahiro Komei, Hideya Takahashi and Yasuhiro Kimura, with scripts written by Yūko Kakihara, character designs and chief animation direction by Naoyuki Asano and Masaru Yokoyama composing the music. The series was announced for 46 full-length episodes of four cours split up into two seasons, with the first two-cour season aired from October 2022 to March 2023, and the second two-cour season aired from January to June 2024. Sentai Filmworks has licensed the series in North America, Europe, Oceania, and selected Latin American and Asian territories.

=== Films ===
Film	Japan release date	Directed by	Written by	Produced by
Urusei Yatsura: Only You	March 11, 1983	Mamoru Oshii	Tomoko Konparu	Yuji Nunokawa
Urusei Yatsura 2: Beautiful Dreamer	February 11, 1984	Mamoru Oshii	Mamoru Oshii	Hidenori Taga
Urusei Yatsura 3: Remember My Love	January 26, 1985	Kazuo Yamazaki	Tomoko Konparu	Hidenori Taga
Urusei Yatsura 4: Lum the Forever	February 22, 1986	Kazuo Yamazaki	Toshiki Inoue & Kazuo Yamazaki	Hidenori Taga
Urusei Yatsura: The Final Chapter	February 6, 1988	Satoshi Dezaki	Tomoko Konparu	Hidenori Taga
Urusei Yatsura: Always My Darling	August 18, 1991	Katsuhisa Yamada	Tomoko Konparu & Hideo Takayashiki	Hidenori Taga

During the television run of the first series, four theatrical films were produced. Urusei Yatsura: Only You was directed by Mamoru Oshii and began showing in Japanese cinemas on March 11, 1983. Urusei Yatsura 2: Beautiful Dreamer was directed by Mamoru Oshii and was released on February 11, 1984. Urusei Yatsura 3: Remember My Love was directed by Kazuo Yamazaki and released on January 26, 1985. Urusei Yatsura 4: Lum the Forever was directed again by Kazuo Yamazaki and released on February 22, 1986.

After the conclusion of the first television series, two more films were produced. A year after the television series finished, Urusei Yatsura: The Final Chapter was directed by Satoshi Dezaki and was released on February 6, 1988, as a tenth-anniversary celebration. It was shown as a double bill with a Maison Ikkoku film. The final film, Urusei Yatsura: Always My Darling, was directed by Katsuhisa Yamada and was released on August 18, 1991. In North America, Beautiful Dreamer was released by Central Park Media. The remaining five films were released by AnimEigo in North America and MVM Films in the United Kingdom. After re-releasing Beautiful Dreamer in North America in 2018, Discotek Media acquired the rights to the other five films in 2020.

=== OVA releases ===
On September 24, 1985, the special Ryoko's September Tea Party was released consisting of a mixture of previously broadcast footage with 15 minutes of new material. A year later on September 15, 1986, Memorial Album was released, mixing new and old footage. On July 18, 1987, the TV special Inaba the Dreammaker was broadcast before being released to video. It was followed by Raging Sherbet on December 2, 1988, and by Nagisa's Fiancé four days later on December 8. The Electric Household Guard was released on August 21, 1989, and followed by I Howl at the Moon on September 1. They were followed by Goat and Cheese on December 21 and Catch the Heart on December 27, 1989. Finally, Terror of Girly-Eyes Measles and Date with a Spirit were released on June 21, 1991. The OVAs were released in North America by AnimEigo who released them individually over six discs. In the UK they were released as a three-disc collection by MVM on September 6, 2004.

On December 23, 2008, a special was shown at the It's a Rumic World exhibition of Rumiko Takahashi's works. Entitled The Obstacle Course Swim Meet, it was the first animated content for the series in 17 years. On January 29, 2010, a boxed set was released featuring all of the recent Rumiko Takahashi specials from the Rumic World exhibition. Entitled It's a Rumic World, the boxed set contains The Obstacle Course Swim as well as a figure of Lum.

=== Video games ===
Many video games have been produced based on the series. The first game to be released was a handheld electronic game, released by Bandai in 1982. Following it were microcomputer games, as well as Urusei Yatsura: Lum no Wedding Bell (うる星やつらラムのウェディングベル), which was released by Jaleco for the Famicom on October 23, 1986, exclusively in Japan. The latter was developed by Tose as a port of the unrelated arcade game Momoko 120%. In 1987, Urusei Yatsura was released by Micro Cabin for the Fujitsu FM-7 and Urusei Yatsura: Koi no Survival Party (うる星やつら恋のサバイバルパーチー) was released for the MSX computer.

Urusei Yatsura: Stay With You was released by Hudson Soft for the PC Engine CD on June 29, 1990. It was rated 25.78 out of 30 by PC Engine Fan magazine. Urusei Yatsura: Miss Tomobiki o Sagase! (うる星やつらミス友引を探せ!) was released by Yanoman for the Nintendo Game Boy on July 3, 1992. Urusei Yatsura: Dear My Friends (うる星やつら~ディア マイ フレンズ) was released by Game Arts for the Sega Mega-CD on April 15, 1994. Urusei Yatsura: Endless Summer (うる星やつら エンドレスサマー) was released for the Nintendo DS by Marvelous on October 20, 2005.

=== Other media ===
A large number of LP albums were released after the series began broadcasting. The first soundtrack album was Music Capsule, which was released on April 21, 1982, and a follow-up, Music Capsule 2, was released on September 21, 1983. A compilation, The Hit Parade, was released in July 1983, and The Hit Parade 2 was released on May 25, 1985. A cover album by Yuko Matsutani, Yuko Matsutani Songbook, was released on May 21, 1984. Lum's voice actress Fumi Hirano also released a cover album, Fumi no Lum Song, which was released on September 21, 1985.

Two books collecting all of Takahashi's color artwork from the series were released under the title Urusei Yatsura: Perfect Color Edition. Both books were released on January 18, 2016, and include a new interview with Takahashi.

== Reception ==
By November 2020, Urusei Yatsura had over 35 million copies in circulation. In 1985, the franchise generated ¥10 billion ($91.12 million) in merchandise sales. The manga won the 26th Shogakukan Manga Award in the shōnen category in 1980. It was awarded the "Best Comic" category at the 18th Seiun Award in 1987. On TV Asahi's Manga Sōsenkyo 2021 poll, in which 150,000 people voted for their top 100 manga series, Urusei Yatsura ranked 61st.

=== Critical reception ===
In Manga: The Complete Guide, Jason Thompson referred to Urusei Yatsura as "A slapstick combination of sci-fi, fairy-tale and ghost-story elements with plenty of cute girls." He also noted that Lum is "the original otaku dream girl." He awarded the series four stars out of four. Graham Higgins of The Independent praised the series. He further wrote that the experience of reading Urusei Yatsura is "a bit like channel-hopping between The Outer Limits, Neighbours, and Star Trek." In an interview with Ex.org, Fred Schodt expressed surprise at the popularity of the original English release of the manga as he believed the cultural differences would be a problem. Reviewing the 2019 English release of the manga, Arpad Lep of Comics Beat called Urusei Yatsura an impressive, essential debut by a living legend of comics, where "many themes and archetypes integral to her whole body of writing emerge already very well-developed." He compared its story to those by Shigeru Mizuki and its art, which he had strong praise for and noted gets better in just the first two volumes alone, to that of Go Nagai. Lep said Takahashi nails the many gags and physical comedy, with the series' stability from the never-changing sitcom elements of "Disappointed parents. Put-upon girlfriend. Insatiable yokai. Weird uncle. And our hero, a total loser" being fun and always staying fresh.

RightStuf wrote that Takahashi excels at creating characters who play off of each other perfectly and Urusei Yatsura's normally "calm [and] innocent", but hot-tempered, Lum serves as a wonderful foil to the "idiotic, lecherous, and lazy" Ataru. Nick Benefield of Operation Rainfall enjoyed that each chapter stands on its own and can largely be read in any order, as well as the manga's "heavy-handed usage" of puns, visual gags, and parodies of other works. He took issue with some of Viz's English translation decisions, not enjoying the amount of American slang used and feeling that terms such as "Oni" and "Karasutengu" should have been left untranslated, but acknowledged its improvement over their original 1990s translation. In a critical review of the first volume, Elias Rosner of Multiversity Comics praised her clear artwork, facial expressions and comedic timing for slapstick comedy, and stated "In spite of Takahashi's always lively artwork and sharp eye for slapstick, Urusei Yatsura is not for everyone. Volume 1 does a brilliant job of introducing the absurdity of the world and the endearing obnoxiousness of its characters. Considering this work debuted over 40 years ago, the ways in which it has remained strong should be commended and fans of Takahashi's works will enjoy seeing her journey as a storyteller, which has only begun in here".

== Influence and legacy ==
The series has been credited by Jonathan Clements in Schoolgirl Milky Crisis: Adventures in the Anime and Manga Trade as influencing multiple other "geek gets girl" works including Tenchi Muyo! and Love Hina. Tokyo Movie Shinsha produced the series Galaxy High School for CBS as an attempt to create a similar series for the American market. The school scenario is reversed to be based around humans attending a high school for aliens.

In 1993, a band from Glasgow formed under the name "Urusei Yatsura" as a tribute. A life-size bronze statue of Lum was erected at Ōizumi-gakuen Station in 2015.

== Use of Japanese culture ==
The series is considered an excellent source for references to Japanese culture and mythology. The manga makes heavy use of Japanese literature, folklore, history and pop culture. Examples of literature and folklore include The Tale of Genji and Urashima Tarō. Many of the characters in the series are derived from mythological creatures. In some cases the creatures themselves appear, and in other cases a character was designed to incorporate the characteristics of a mythological creature.

Stories and situations made use of these mythological elements to create jokes and draw comparisons with the original mythology. For example, the Oni choose tag to decide their contest with Earth because the Japanese word for Tag, Onigokko, means "game of the Oni". When Ataru grabs Lum's horns during their contest and she misunderstands his statement that he can get married, it is a reference to the myth that grabbing the horns of an Oni will make your dream come true.
