= List of Maison Ikkoku episodes =

The anime television series Maison Ikkoku is based on the manga series of the same name by Rumiko Takahashi. The series consists of 96 episodes, three original video animation (OVA) episodes, and an animated film.

The anime uses five opening theme songs and six closing themes. The first opening theme is "Kanashimi yo Konnichi wa" by Yuki Saito, used for the first 37 episodes with the exception of episode 24, which uses "Alone Again (Naturally)" by Gilbert O'Sullivan, although the previous opening takes its place in the English dub due to copyright issues. The opening theme that replaced the first opening in episode 38 is "Suki sa" by Anzen Chitai which was used until episode 52. The last two opening themes are "Sunny Shiny Morning" by Kiyonori Matsuo, used from episodes 53–76 and "Hidamari" by Kōzō Murashita for the remainder of the series. The first ending theme for the first 14 episodes is "Ashita Hareru ka" by Takao Kisugi, which was replaced by "Ci·ne·ma" by Picasso in episode 15 which continued to be in use until episode 33. In episode 24, that theme was replaced by "Get Down" also by O'Sullivan but same reason as before with the second opening theme. The second ending theme was replaced by "Fantasy" by Picasso in episode 34 which continued to be in use until episode 52. The final two ending themes are "Sayonara no Sobyō" ("Sayonara no dessan") by Picasso which was used for episodes 53–76 and "Begin the Night" by Picasso for the remainder of the series.

== Episodes ==
=== Season 1 (1986–87) ===
No. overall	No. in season	Title	Directed by	Written by	Animation directed by	Original release date
1	1	"Sorry to Keep You Waiting! I'm Kyoko Otonashi!"; Transliteration: "Omatase Shimashita! Watashi ga Otonashi Kyōko Desu!!" (Japanese: お待たせしました！私が音無響子です!!)	Kazuo Yamazaki	Tokio Tsuchiya	Masaaki Kannan	March 26, 1986
Kyoko moves in as the new manager and catches her first glimpse of the wacky tenants of Maison Ikkoku. Godai, the other main character in the series, instantly falls in love with her.
2	2	"Love Is in the Air! Which One Does Kyoko Love Best?"; Transliteration: "Koi no Hibana Pachipachi! Kyōko-san wa Dare ga Suki" (Japanese: 恋の火花パチパチ！響子さんは誰が好き)	Directed by : Naoyuki Yoshinaga; Storyboarded by : Kunihiko Yuyama	Shigeru Yanagawa	Keiko Hattori	April 2, 1986
Godai wants to give Kyoko a gift for Christmas. However, it isn't so easy. While fixing the roof, Kyoko falls asleep. Godai finds her right before it starts to rain and catches her as she falls; however, he accidentally gropes her breasts and gets slapped.
3	3	"Hearts on Fire in the Dark! All Alone with Kyoko"; Transliteration: "Kurayami de Dokki Doki Kyōko-san to Futarikiri" (Japanese: 暗やみでドッキドキ響子さんと二人きり)	Directed by : Osamu Sekita; Storyboarded by : Norio Kashima	Tomoko Konparu	Naohito Takahashi	April 9, 1986
The exams that determine which entrance exams you can take are coming up. Kyoko tries to get the gang off Godai's case, which touches Godai. When the power goes off, she and Godai go to the attic to fix it, and learns of the inscriptions made in the walls made by the original owners of Maison Ikkoku, during the tough times they went through during the war. When Godai tells her his appreciation, Kyoko falls down only to wake up in Godai's arms; she pummels him, despite the fact he was only going to try CPR to revive her. Afterwards, she fixes the power but also ends up fixing a clock that rings all night keeping everyone up, including Godai.
4	4	"Kyoko's Heart Goes Pitty-Pat! Godai Is Put to the Test"; Transliteration: "Kyōko-san Harahara?! Godai-kun wa Juken Desu" (Japanese: 響子さんハラハラ?!五代くんは受験です)	Tomokazu Kougo	Junki Takegami	Keiko Hattori	April 16, 1986
Godai is taking entrance exams and Kyoko is wishing him the best. Meanwhile, the other tenants are having a bet as to how many times he fails; they also tease Kyoko for being so supportive, implying she is starting to have feelings for Godai.
5	5	"Kyoko's Climbing the Walls! Godai's Headed for the Hills"; Transliteration: "Kyōko-san Yakimoki! Godai-kun ga Ie Dashita" (Japanese: 響子さんヤキモキ！五代くんが家出した)	Directed by : Kazuo Yamazaki; Storyboarded by : Yoriyasu Kogawa	Hiroshi Konishikawa	Masaaki Kannan	April 23, 1986
While waiting for the exam results, Godai stays with a friend to avoid the onslaught of everyone's teasing. Meanwhile, his grandmother comes by to take him home if he fails. In the end, Godai is accepted to a university.
6	6	"Shocking Springtime! Kyoko's Secret!!"; Transliteration: "Haru wa Shokkingu! Kyōko-san no Himitsu!!" (Japanese: 春はショッキング！響子さんの秘密!!)	Directed by : Naoyuki Yoshinaga; Storyboarded by : Yamauchi Shigeyasu	Tokio Tsuchiya	Tsukasa Dokite	April 30, 1986
Godai is adjusting to his new classes. Kyoko gets a visit from her father-in-law, the landlord, and Godai is there to kiss up. When they visit a grave, Godai is in shock when he learns it is the grave of Kyoko's late husband!
7	7	"Godai's Agony! The One Kyoko Loves"; Transliteration: "Godai-kun Nayumimasu! Kyōko-san no Suki na Hito" (Japanese: 五代くん悩みます！響子さんの好きな人)	Directed by : Tomokazu Kougo; Storyboarded by : Tamiko Kojima	Michiru Shimada	Keiko Hattori	May 7, 1986
Godai is wavering on his feelings of competing with the late Soichiro. Ikuko, Kyoko's niece (from Soichiro's family), is still crushing on Godai and requests him as a tutor. Godai ignores the small fish and makes up his mind to go for the seemingly unattainable Kyoko.
8	8	"Godai's Unspeakable Declaration! If You're Going to Do It, Do It!"; Transliteration: "Godai-kun Ikenai Zekkyō Yaru Toki wa Yarimasu!" (Japanese: 五代くんいけない絶叫やる時はやります！)	Directed by : Iku Suzuki; Storyboarded by : Kunihiko Yuyama	Junki Takegami	Masaaki Kannan	May 14, 1986
Godai is drinking with Sakamoto trying to work up the nerves to declare his feelings. The magic of alcohol turns our protagonist to a complete alpha, yelling out his feelings and putting the smooth moves on Kyoko...until he passes out and forgets. The next morning Godai has to piece together the information but of course, no one is helpful and Godai is gullible. Little does he know his brash antics have Kyoko's heart racing (as hearing him declare his love for her was a shock). Of course, things go awry at the end.
9	9	"The Mysterious Tennis Coach Is the Rival of Love"; Transliteration: "Nazo no Tenisu Kōchi wa Koi no Raibaru Desu!" (Japanese: 謎のテニスコーチは恋のライバルです!)	Naoyuki Yoshinaga	Hiroshi Konishikawa	Naohito Takahashi	May 21, 1986
Kyoko begins taking tennis lessons with Mrs. Ichinose upon a neighbor's suggestion. Coach Shun Mitaka is introduced, and like Godai, he instantly falls in love with her. He is very smooth and bold competition for Godai. Attending the Chachamaru party, Godai confirms that he meant his declaration of love to Kyoko of the night before, embarrassing her to the point of running off.
10	10	"Love Panic on the Beach!"; Transliteration: "Nagisa no Rabu Panikku! Raibaru wa Inugirai!!" (Japanese: 渚のラブパニック！ライバルは犬嫌い!!)	Tomokazu Kougo	Shigeru Yanagawa	Atsuko Nakajima	May 28, 1986
Kentaro is upset that his parents never take him anywhere during the summer vacation, and Godai offers to take him to the beach. Kyoko agrees to go as well...along with Mitaka and Ikuko, destroying Godai's dream of a romantic day with the manager. But, Kentaro and Ikuko sneak Mr. Soichiro with them to the beach, and Mitaka is revealed to be deathly afraid of dogs! As long as Godai keeps Mr. Soichiro near, perhaps his dream is possible! Perhaps...
11	11	"Kentaro's First Love! What's Age Got to Do with It?"; Transliteration: "Kentarō no Hatsukoi! Ai ga Areba Toshi no Sa Nante" (Japanese: 賢太郎の初恋！愛があれば年の差なんて)	Directed by : Iku Suzuki; Storyboarded by : Kazuo Yamazaki	Michiru Shimada	Tsukasa Dokite	June 4, 1986
Following their trip to the beach, Kentaro has developed a crush on the older Ikuko and studies with her and Godai during their tutoring session. His quiet and shy behavior surprises Godai, until Kyoko later tells him that he has a crush, as most young boys develop crushes on older girls. Godai knows that that fact holds true not just for young boys! When Kyoko offers to cook dinner for Godai and Ikoku, he's overjoyed...but only until he finds out it's her late husband's favorite dish. However, Kyoko seems to have become closer to Godai; he held her hand after she accidentally cut herself, without protest.
12	12	"One Entangled Evening! I Thought You Said You Loved Me!?"; Transliteration: "Koi no Sukuranburu! Sukitte Itteta no ni..." (Japanese: 恋のスクランブル！好きって言ってたのに...)	Directed by : Osamu Sekita; Storyboarded by : Tamiko Kojima	Tomoko Konparu	Keiko Hattori	June 11, 1986
Godai bought expensive movie tickets in the hopes of taking Kyoko on a date, but he finds out that Mitaka is already taking her out! Upset, he considers what to do with the tickets, until a co-worker from his part-time job runs into him, and she sure is cute and persistent! Enter Kozue Nanao, the sweet and naive girl that throws a curve ball into Kyoko and Godai's relationship for the next several years. When Kyoko sees them together, she's outraged, believing that Godai used and disregarded her heart, and poor Mitaka is stuck with her unpleasant demeanor for the rest of the evening!
13	13	"Godai the Gigolo...? Are You Going to Get That, or Shall I?"; Transliteration: "Motemote Kodai-kun? Momoiro Denwa ni Goyō Kokoro!" (Japanese: モテモテ五代くん？桃色電話にご用心!)	Naoyuki Yoshinaga	Junki Takegami	Masaaki Kannan	June 18, 1986
Godai gets sucked into joining the puppet theatre club at his college, and the girls are calling him constantly with news and general silliness. Kyoko, already flaming jealous due to Godai's date with Kozue, snaps once these mysterious girls – plus Kozue, of course – are now jamming Maison Ikkoku's telephone line. Will she ever calm down long enough for Godai to explain things to her?
14	14	"Way to Go Godai! The First Date with Kyoko"; Transliteration: "Yatta ne Godai-kun! Kyōko-san to Hatsu Dēto" (Japanese: やったね五代くん！響子さんと初デート)	Iku Suzuki	Michiru Shimada	Naohito Takahashi	June 25, 1986
It's been one year since Kyoko moved into Ikkoku and became the new manager. Godai's been saving his money to ask Kyoko to dinner, and boy is he surprised when she accepts! Overjoyed, he tells her the name of the restaurant to meet him at, and she mixes it up with the similarly-named bar where the gang always goes to drink. They'd been planning a party for her anyway, in celebration of the anniversary, and as the evening drags on and Kyoko and Godai each wait for each other at separate places, emotions run high. When she finally realizes her mistake and runs to meet him, will he still be there waiting? And will Godai finally get the perfect romantic evening with Kyoko that he's been dreaming about for a year?
15	15	"The Play's the Thing, Not the Playing Around! The Show Must Go On"; Transliteration: "Abunai Futari no Ningyōgeki! Boku Mō Dame Desu" (Japanese: あぶない二人の人形劇！僕もうダメです)	Tomokazu Kougo	Tomoko Konparu	Tsukasa Dokite	July 2, 1986
Godai's college is finally having its festival, and he's playing the prince in the puppet theatre club's production! Kyoko wants to go to the festival and see the college life that she never got to experience, though she's still young enough to be a student. Due to a wacky turn of events, Kyoko ends up playing the princess in Godai's play, and he can't concentrate because of her extremely close proximity and declarations of love for him (her lines to the prince, naturally.) Afterwards, he gives Kyoko the puppet of the princess.
16	16	"Sympathy Scramble! If I Should Stumble"; Transliteration: "Omimai Panikku! Taorete mo Suki na Hito" (Japanese: お見舞パニック！倒れても好きな人)	Directed by : Osamu Sekita; Storyboarded by : Tamiko Kojima	Shigeru Yanagawa	Keiko Hattori	July 9, 1986
Godai thinks he has bad luck after his chopstick breaks and a series of seemingly close accidents occur. When Kyoko hurts herself at tennis, Mitaka uses the opportunity to get closer to her. Godai feels that his bad luck caused her troubles. Both of Kyoko's suitors battle to stand out while the neighbors do their best to interfere.
17	17	"The Story of Kyoko's First Love on Rainy Days Like These"; Transliteration: "Kyōko-san no Hatsukoi Monogatari Ame no Hi wa Itsumo..." (Japanese: 響子さんの初恋物語雨の日はいつも...)	Directed by : Naoyuki Yoshinaga; Storyboarded by : Kazuo Yamazaki	Michiru Shimada	Masaaki Kannan	July 16, 1986
While Godai hates the rainy weather, due to the memories of something bad always happening to him, Kyoko, on the other hand, is overjoyed as it reminds of when she met her late husband. Kozue meets Kyoko and both bond; however, the downside is Kyoko is left thinking about Soichiro and how much she misses him.
18	18	"Kyoko's Gift! What? You Mean It's for Me?"; Transliteration: "Kyōko-san no Okurimono E? Kore o Boku ni!?" (Japanese: 響子さんの贈り物エッ？これを僕に!?)	Iku Suzuki	Tokio Tsuchiya	Naohito Takahashi	July 23, 1986
It's the second Christmas since Kyoko arrived and Godai wants to get the manager a gift. However, his present for her, earrings, end up going to Kozue as he hasn't broken up with her; luckily he discovers his present for Kyoko from the previous year under his desk. Kyoko loves the brooch; at the same time, Godai learns he's only two years younger than her.
19	19	"Godai and Kyoko! An Evening for Two Means Double the Trouble"; Transliteration: "Godai to Kyōko! Futari no Yoru wa Kiken ga Ippai" (Japanese: 五代と響子！二人の夜は危険がいっぱい)	Tomokazu Kougo	Junki Takegami	Tsukasa Dokite	July 30, 1986
It's New Years! The Ichinoses are heading to their relatives' house until the 4th, and Yotsuya is off to God-knows-where. Akemi invites Godai to watch television with her and Kyoko. However, this gets him scheming about finally making a move on Kyoko. When Akemi's friends call to invite her on a ski trip, Akemi accepts, but leaves Kyoko paranoid by her warnings about Godai. Over the course of the night, Godai tries making a move, but his conscience keeps getting the better of him. When Kyoko temporarily leaves to turn off the Ichinose's pilot-light, Godai yells that he "wants to do it", meaning make a move on Kyoko. However, Kyoko hears this and Godai quickly lies that he's jealous of Akemi going skiing, something he wanted to do. Kyoko accepts this and finally calms down; after the start of the New Year, Godai goes to bed, upset that he chickened out. However, Kyoko is impressed by what a gentleman he's been, deciding to "take him". She knocks on Godai's door, making him half-expect she's going to sleep with him; however, she's actually inviting him to visit the temple. Knowing that he shouldn't have expected that, Godai agrees and prays that Kyoko will be his this year.
20	20	"Kyoko's Ticking Time Bomb! Godai's Extended Absence"; Transliteration: "Kyōko-san Iraira!? Kaeranai Godai-kun no Nazo" (Japanese: 響子さんイライラ!?帰らない五代君の謎)	Directed by : Osamu Sekita; Storyboarded by : Tamiko Kojima	Tomoko Konparu	Keiko Hattori	August 6, 1986
Godai gets a black eye and decides to stay home until it heals; he doesn't want Kyoko to see his injury.
21	21	"Godai's Panic! The Cat Who Came to Ikkoku!!"; Transliteration: "Godai-kun Panikku! Ikkokukan no Koneko Monogatari!!" (Japanese: 五代くんパニック！一刻館の子猫物語!!)	Naoyuki Yoshinaga	Hiroshi Konishikawa	Masaaki Kannan	August 13, 1986
Godai is suckered into taking care of a cat named Kyoko by his drinking buddy. This leads to the other tenants finding out and calling the cat's name, making the manager think she's needed. When Godai explains how the cat is doing to his friend, Mrs. Ichinose mistakes the cat sharing Godai's bed for manager Kyoko sleeping with him. When she tells Kyoko of this, she furiously demands an answer until discovering cat food and that the cat has gone missing. They find Kyoko the cat sleeping in Soichiro's dog house with him.
22	22	"Godai Gets a Shock! Kyoko Calls it Quits"; Transliteration: "Dai Shokku Godai-kun! Kyōko-san no Intai Sengen" (Japanese: 大ショック五代くん！響子さんの引退宣言)	Iku Suzuki	Junki Takegami	Naohito Takahashi	August 20, 1986
Kyoko visits her parents, the Chigusas, who want her to quit being manager of Maison Ikkoku and come back home. However, she tells them she won't and begins to think of all the positive things about the house she likes. Attempting to fix the balcony, she nearly falls to her death; however, Godai saves her with a loving embrace. Annoyed that the tenants aren't nice and have trouble paying their rent on time, Kyoko discovers termites have begun infesting the building. Calling in an exterminator and contractors, Kyoko watches as Ikkoku is fixed up. At the same time, Godai wants the hole, which Yotsuya uses to invade his privacy, sealed. Yutsuya threatens to reveal he's heard Godai call out Kyoko's name at night while doing "something"; Godai lets him call it out, thinking that Kyoko is outside and can't hear due to a passing plane. However, Kyoko was at the foot of the stairs and asks Godai to clean his room so the hole can be repaired and Yotsuya can't reveal anymore secrets. When Kyoko is late one night, Mrs. Chigusa arrives and informs the tenants (Godai, Mrs. Ichinose, and Yotsuya) that Kyoko has quit her job.
23	23	"Kyoko's Brush with Danger! Mother's Nefarious Plot"; Transliteration: "Kyōko-san Kiken Ippatsu! Osorobeki Haha no Inbō!!" (Japanese: 響子さん危機一髪！恐るべき母の陰謀!!)	Directed by : Tomokazu Kougo; Storyboarded by : Kazuo Yamazaki	Junki Takegami	Atsuko Nakajima	August 27, 1986
No sooner has Mrs. Chigusa explained Kyoko has quit, movers pack up all the manager's belongings and drive off. Godai breaks down and cries, being dragged to Chachamaru by Mrs. Ichinose to drink his sorrow away. Mr. Yotsuya remains in the manager's room to compose himself, meeting Kyoko, who was late due to buying groceries; once Kyoko learns what her mother has done, she informs Yotsuya that she is going to see her parents. However, he seems to not understand what has happened despite Kyoko's anger, informing the others she left them with some snacks. Kyoko later returns to her room, finding all the tenants drinking inside; Godai happily embraces her. Explaining that her mother lied, and moved her things without consent (which is possibly illegal), Kyoko is happily welcomed back by everyone.
24	24	"Godai in Confusion! Kozue's First Kiss"; Transliteration: "Godai-kun Dogimagi! Kozue to Hatsu Kissu!?" (Japanese: 五代くんドギマギ！こずえと初キッス!?)	Directed by : Naoyuki Yoshinaga; Storyboarded by : Kazuyoshi Katayama	Tokio Tsuchiya	Tsukasa Dokite	September 3, 1986
Kyoko goes to Soichiro's grave with her parents and Mr.Otonashi, who encourage her to move on and take back her maiden name. Meanwhile, Kozue tricks Godai into meeting her parents.
25	25	"In This Corner: Godai vs. Mitaka! The Clash of the Proposals"; Transliteration: "Gekitō! Godai Basasu Mitaka Puropōzu Taisakusen!!" (Japanese: 激闘！五代VS三鷹プロポーズ大作戦!!)	Directed by : Osamu Sekita; Storyboarded by : Tamiko Kojima	Shigeru Yanagawa	Keiko Hattori	September 10, 1986
26	26	"Godai's Out of It! Kyoko's on the Rampage"; Transliteration: "Godai Bōzen! Kyōko no Yakimochi Daibakuhatsu!!" (Japanese: 五代ボー然！響子のヤキモチ大爆発!!)	Kazuo Yamazaki	Michiru Shimada	Naohito Takahashi	September 17, 1986
27	27	"Soichiro Gone!? Yakitori Memories"; Transliteration: "Kieta Sōichirō!? Omoide wa Yakitori no Kaori" (Japanese: 消えた惣一郎!?思い出は焼鳥の香り)	Directed by : Kazuyoshi Katayama; Storyboarded by : Takashi Anno	Kazunori Itō	Masaaki Kannan	September 24, 1986
28	28	"Even Kyoko's Surprised! "I'm Kentaro's Father""; Transliteration: "Kyōko-san mo Bikkuri: Watashi ga Kentarō no Chichi Desu" (Japanese: 響子さんもビックリ私が賢太郎の父です)	Iku Suzuki	Hiroshi Konishikawa	Keiko Hattori	October 1, 1986
Kyoko meets the usually absent Mr. Ichinose. Kentaro asks Kyoko and Godai to attend sports day at his school in place of his parents (as his father works long hours and he fears his mother will embarrass him with drunken antics.) Mrs. Ichinose overhears and surprises Kentaro with his father taking a day off and her being sober.
29	29	"Fall Festival Foul-Up! All Swell That Ends In a Well"; Transliteration: "Hachamecha Aki Matsuri Kyōko-san to Idō no Naka" (Japanese: ハチャメチャ秋祭り響子さんと井戸の中)	Tomokazu Kougo	Kazunori Itō	Atsuko Nakajima	October 8, 1986
Godai, Kyoko, and Kentaro are participating in a " Haunted Walk" style event at a local fall festival. Unfortunately, Kyoko misunderstands her directions and ends up in the bottom of a real dry well instead of the prop well prepared for her skit. Godai finds her and tries to get her out, as do Kozue and Yotsuya, but they all end up trapped.
30	30	"What!? Kyoko Married!? Godai's Tearful Goodbye"; Transliteration: "E! Kyōko-san Kekkon!? Godai-kun Namida no Hikkoshi" (Japanese: エッ響子さん結婚!?五代くん涙の引越し)	Naoyuki Yoshinaga	Kazunori Itō	Masaaki Kannan	October 15, 1986
Godai moves out of Maison Ikkoku after being led to believe that Kyoko is getting married. He finds an apartment above a pachinko parlour, but the current tenants, a married couple, aren't ready to move out just yet.
31	31	"Scandal at Ikkoku! Godai's... Shacking Up!?"; Transliteration: "Ikkokukan Sukyandaru Godai-kun ga Dōseichū!?" (Japanese: 一刻館スキャンダル五代くんが同棲中!?)	Kazuyoshi Katayama	Kazunori Itō	Naohito Takahashi	October 22, 1986
Kyoko goes looking for Godai, only to meet the wife. When Godai runs into her later, he explains the situation, and Kyoko invites him to move back.
32 (Note: Episode not based on an original manga story)	32	"The Incredible, Unforgettable Egg! Yotsuya's Dangerous Gift"; Transliteration: "Tamago wa Misuterī? Yotsuya no Kiken na Okurimono" (Japanese: 玉子はミステリー？四谷の危険な贈り物)	Directed by : Naoyuki Yoshinaga; Storyboarded by : Tamiko Kojima	Kazunori Itō	Keiko Hattori	October 29, 1986
Yotsuya informs the other tenants that he will be on business the next few days. However, he oddly leaves Godai an egg; due to Yotsuya's odd personality, everyone debates what he wanted done with the egg. Its later revealed Yotsuya found it on the ground and wanted the egg disposed of.
33	33	"The Case of the Shocking Diary My Husband Had a Sweetheart!"; Transliteration: "Nikki ni Shokku! Sōichirō ni Koibito ga Ita!?" (Japanese: 日記にショック！惣一郎に恋人がいた!?)	Iku Suzuki	Michiru Shimada	Atsuko Nakajima	November 5, 1986
Mr. Otonashi gives Godai an old diary of Soichiro's to pass on to Kyoko. When she reads it, she comes across an entry that leads her to believe Soichiro was seeing someone else. Since there was a photograph next to the problematic entry, but it has since fallen out, Kyoko goes searching for it.
34	34	"Overpowered by Love! The Grandma Yukari Gold Tooth Gauntlet!"; Transliteration: "Koi wa Gōin ni! Yukari Bā-chan Kinba de Shōbu" (Japanese: 恋は強引に！ゆかり婆ちゃん金歯で勝負)	Kazuyoshi Katayama	Hiroshi Konishikawa	Masaaki Kannan	November 12, 1986
Godai's grandmother becomes aware of his "indecision" between Kyoko and Kozue, deciding to intervene.
35	35	"The Great Date Race! Kyoko and Godai Have Left the Building"; Transliteration: "Tsuiseki Taisakusen! Kyōko to Godai no Dēto o Nerae" (Japanese: 追跡大作戦！響子と五代のデートを狙え)	Tomokazu Kougo	Hiroshi Konishikawa	Atsuko Nakajima	November 19, 1986
36	36	"A Kiss Is Just a Kiss... But a Woman's Love is Priceless"; Transliteration: "Ikinari Kisu no Arashi! Akemi-san no Shitsuren Monogatari" (Japanese: いきなりキスの嵐！朱美さんの失恋物語)	Naoyuki Yoshinaga	Kazunori Itō	Keiko Hattori	November 26, 1986
Akemi gets dumped and starts drinking more heavily. Her increased negativity starts affecting the rest of the tenants. The name of the song who appears in this episode is Mutekiga Ore o Yondeiru (The Call of the Foghorn) and several scenes are based in the film of the same name.
37	37	"Crazy Costume Contest! Kyoko's Amazing Transformation"; Transliteration: "Abunai Kasen Taikai!! Kyōko mo Kageki ni Taihenshin" (Japanese: アブナイ仮装大会!!響子も過激に大変身)	Directed by : Tomokazu Kougo; Storyboarded by : Tamiko Kojima	Michiru Shimada	Naohito Takahashi	December 3, 1986
Kyoko orders a floor length mirror for her room and decides to try on her old high school uniform. Before she can take it off, the other tenants bust into her room and try to get her to party with them. They whisk her off to Godai's room, and don costumes themselves. Ichinose and Godai get their old high school outfits, while Akemi dresses as a nurse and Yotsuya as a Buddhist monk. They begin acting out little plays until Mitaka arrives. After seeing how much fun Kyoko is having with Godai, he readily joins in, becoming a doctor. They continue to wrestle and get out of control until Kentaro comes home and tells Kyoko how disappointed in her he is.
38	38	"Godai's Dumped!? Kozue Falls for Coach Mitaka!?"; Transliteration: "Godai-kun Shitsuren? Kozue ga Mitaka no Kyūsekkin!?" (Japanese: 五代くん失恋？こずえが三鷹に急接近!?)	Iku Suzuki	Hiroshi Konishikawa	Masaaki Kannan	December 10, 1986
Kozue begins to notice that Godai isn't as affectionate with her as other couples in their dating situation seem to be (a miraculous turn of events). She begins worrying about why this is happening and turns to Mitaka for answers. He readily instructs her, in hopes that keeping Kozue together with Godai will open up his chances of winning Kyoko. Yotsuya spies on Mitaka and reports back to Godai. Yusaku had no idea that any of this was going on, but decides it's time to break up with Kozue. He runs into her and Mitaka at a diner, and Mitaka tells him to say goodbye the right way. Godai thinks this must mean to break up with Kozue, so when he tries to he puts his arm around her, and Kozue gets excited, because all she wanted in the first place was a little more affection from Godai.
39	39	"Love Takes Guts! Godai's Part Time Job Ploy!"; Transliteration: "Koi wa Gattsu de Shōbu! Godai no Baito Taisakusen" (Japanese: 恋はガッツで勝負！五代のバイト大作戦)	Kazuyoshi Katayama	Kazunori Itō	Atsuko Nakajima	December 17, 1986
40	40	"A Bittersweet Favor! Budding Christmas Love!?"; Transliteration: "Yasashisa ga Setsunakute Kurisumasu wa Koi no Yokan" (Japanese: 優しさがせつなくてX'マスは恋の予感！)	Directed by : Tomokazu Kougo; Storyboarded by : Tamiko Kojima	Kazunori Itō	Kiichi Takaoka	December 24, 1986
41	41	"Kyoko's Hot Spring Heart Stopper: Peeping Wars at the Outdoor Baths!"; Transliteration: "Yunobori Kyōko ni Doki! Rotenburo Nozoki Gassen" (Japanese: 湯上り響子にドキッ露天風呂のぞき合戦)	Naoyuki Yoshinaga	Hiroshi Konishikawa	Masaaki Kannan	January 7, 1987
The Ikkoku residents and Mitaka decide to visit an onsen. Soon after they enter the baths Godai almost drowns when he gets stuck in the dividing wall between the men's and women's sections. Later it's discovered that Mrs. Ichinose and Yotsuya have spent most of their food money on booze. After the party ends Godai wakes up in the middle of night to find himself face to face with a sleeping Kyoko.
42	42	"Godai Breaks His Leg! Chance for Love at the Hospital!"; Transliteration: "Godai-kun Kossetsu! Koi no Chansu wa Byōshitsu de!!" (Japanese: 五代くん骨折！恋のチャンスは病室で!!)	Directed by : Eisuke Kondo; Storyboarded by : Iku Suzuki	Kazunori Itō	Hiroshi Ogawa	January 14, 1987
43	43	"Love Speaks! Godai and Mitaka Duke it Out at the Hospital!"; Transliteration: "Koi no Hibana ga Supāku Godai to Mitaka Nyūin Sōdō" (Japanese: 恋の火花がスパーク五代と三鷹入院騒動)	Tomokazu Kougo	Kazunori Itō	Naohito Takahashi	January 21, 1987
44	44	"Kentaro Goes Pale! Yotsuya's Frightening Aspect"; Transliteration: "Kentarō-kun mo Matsuao?! Yotsuya no Osorobeki Shōtai" (Japanese: 賢太郎君もマッ青?!四谷の恐るべき正体)	Naoyuki Yoshinaga	Kazunori Itō	Masaaki Kannan	January 28, 1987
45	45	"A Shocking Revelation: Kyoko Declares Her Love to Godai?!"; Transliteration: "Shōgeki no Jūdai?! Kyōko ga Godai no Ai no Kokuhaku" (Japanese: 衝撃の重大発言?!響子が五代に愛の告白)	Directed by : Iku Suzuki; Storyboarded by : Tomomi Mochizuki	Michiru Shimada	Atsuko Nakajima	February 4, 1987
Finals approach and Godai has fallen behind in all his classes because of his hospital stay. Sakamoto helps him out by providing a copy of all his notes and answers to old tests. Kyoko decides to make sure the other residents stay out of his room and don't do any loud partying until finals are over. Kyoko is also being more affectionate than ever and even prepares his meals. As Godai studies for his last test Kyoko promises to wake him up the next morning, but the tenants decide to party in Kyoko's room, so she doesn't get any sleep. When she wakes up the next morning, she realizes the test will begin in thirty minutes. She rushes Godai into a taxi and goes to school with him to try to beg the professor to let him in, but its all in vain. As Godai realizes he will have to repeat another year of school, Kyoko tells him she's willing to wait for him. Suddenly Sakamoto arrives and tells Godai that the schedule he gave him was wrong and that their test begins in a few minutes. A very perturbed Kyoko simply gets up and walks away.
46	46	"Race for Kyoko! Skating Rink is Love's Battleground"; Transliteration: "Kyōko Sōdatsu! Sukēto Rinku wa Ai no Senjō" (Japanese: 響子争奪！スケートリンクは愛の戦場)	Directed by : Eisuke Kondo; Storyboarded by : Iku Suzuki	Kazunori Itō	Hiroshi Ogawa	February 11, 1987
Kyoko, Mrs. Ichinose, Kentaro and Ikuko plan a trip to a skating rink with Godai and Mitaka tagging along. Once they arrive it turns out neither Mitaka nor Godai have a clue about how to skate. They begin stumbling all over the rink, begging Kyoko to help them and refusing the help of Mrs. Ichinose. Kyoko reluctantly agrees to help, but soon gives up and says she needs to spend some time with the children and passes Mitaka and Godai onto Mrs. Ichinose. But Mitaka and Godai persist and make a deal with one another. A race to the Manager with the winner getting private lessons from her. Later that day, both Mitaka and Godai have mastered skating, but are still not fast enough to catch Kyoko.
47	47	"Kyoko Loses It! Drunk and Crazy!"; Transliteration: "Kyōko Hachamecha! Yoi Dorete Puttsun" (Japanese: 響子ハチャメチャ！酔いどれてプッツン)	Directed by : Tomokazu Kougo; Storyboarded by : Naoyuki Yoshinaga	Hiroshi Konishikawa	Kiichi Takaoka	February 18, 1987
Godai and Sakamoto are out of school for a week. They get a part time job at a local Izakaya and Sakamoto will be staying with Godai at the Ikkoku. When the two friends arrive at Maison Ikkoku, Kyoko invites Sakamoto to have dinner with her and tells Godai he can come too causing Godai to get jealous. Sakamoto then invites her to come visit them at the tavern. The next night, when Godai is working, not only Kyoko arrives but also Yotsuya, Akemi, and Mrs. Ichinose. The trio becomes very rowdy and get Godai in trouble with his boss. Godai is very eager to get rid of them, but is reminded by Kyoko that they think he's going to pay for everything. On the way home, Godai carries drunk Kyoko up the hill. She wakes up long enough to find out that Godai paid for everything and berates him for being so weak-willed.
48	48	"Godai's Confession! I Want You to Know How I Feel!!"; Transliteration: "Godai Gekihaku! Boku no Kimochi o Wakatte Hoshii!!" (Japanese: 五代激白！僕の気持ちを判ってほしい!!)	Directed by : Iku Suzuki; Storyboarded by : Shunji Ôga	Hiroshi Konishikawa	Masaaki Kannan	February 25, 1987
Her mother has been sick lately so Kyoko goes home to help out for few days. When her stay is longer than expected, Godai starts to worry. When he is taking Soichiro for a walk he meets Mr. Ichinose. The two eat at a food stall and Mr. Ichinose tells Godai how he met his wife. The next day Kyoko tries to tell her mother that she needs to go back to Maison Ikkoku, but her mother won't let her, so she comes up with a story about needing a special pillow or she won't be able to sleep. Mrs. Chigusa calls up Maison Ikkoku and requests the pillow. Godai arrives wearing a suit and delivers Kyoko's pillow. While visiting, Kyoko's parents interrogate him about who he is and what he does. When the subject of girls comes up Godai very delicately hints that he's in love with Kyoko. Of course, her parents don't get it, but Kyoko does, and after Godai leaves she is unexpectedly happy.
49	49	"Mitaka Trains! Lover Boy Can't Be Afraid of Dogs!"; Transliteration: "Mitaka Mōtokkun! Inu ga Kowakute Koi ga Dekiru ka" (Japanese: 三鷹の猛特訓！犬が恐くて恋ができるか)	Sunao Katabuchi	Hiroshi Konishikawa	Atsuko Nakajima	March 4, 1987
Akemi, Yotsuya and Mrs. Ichinose offer to help Mitaka overcome his phobia of dogs.
50	50	"Kyoko in Love at First Sight?! A Strange Man Moves into Maison Ikkoku"; Transliteration: "Kyōko ga Hitomebore?! Ikkokukan ni Hen na Dōjō" (Japanese: 響子が一目惚れ?!一刻館にヘンな奴登場)	Directed by : Iku Suzuki; Storyboarded by : Tamiko Kojima	Kazunori Itō	Naohito Takahashi	March 11, 1987
A kind older-looking man shows up on the front porch of Maison Ikkoku and says that he is the new tenant, Zenzaburo Mitsukoshi. During the welcoming party everyone seems to take to him instantly, especially Kyoko, after he reveals he is a widower. A rumor is floating around town that Maison Ikkoku is to be torn down. Everyone rushes back to Maison Ikkoku and shares their news. Kyoko decides to find Mitsukoshi and tell him.
51	51	"Even Yotsuya's Shocked! The Day Maison Ikkoku Disappears"; Transliteration: "Yotsuya-san mo Bikkuri Ikkokukan ga Kieru Hi!?" (Japanese: 四谷さんもびっくり一刻館が消える日!?)	Directed by : Eisuke Kondo; Storyboarded by : Iku Suzuki	Hiroshi Konishikawa	Hiroshi Ogawa	March 18, 1987
Kyoko tries to contact her father-in-law, the owner of Maison Ikkoku, but he's away on a business trip. The tenants decide to track these rumors to the source, and get to the bottom of this. Godai meets with Kozue. She tells him that she's seen Mitsukoshi going into a realtors office every morning on her way to school. Godai and Mitaka stake out the office building and watch as Mitsukoshi enters. Kyoko confronts Mitsukoshi, he tells her that the realtors office used to be a building he grew up in, and he continually visits it for nostalgia's sake. Godai doesn't believe him but Kyoko refuses to press the issue. Overnight, Mitsukoshi disappears. The next morning a telegram arrives for him from the realtors office telling him to report to work and the tenants discover he has moved all of his things out. Days later, everyone gathers at Maison Ikkoku and learns that Mitaka was able to piece together the story. Mitsukoshi worked for a company that investigated old properties where new buildings could be built. Apparently, after getting to know everyone at Maison Ikkoku, he felt so terrible about what he was doing he called his office and quit, causing them to send the telegram. Kyoko is especially saddened by the fact that he felt he had to leave but is relieved that Maison Ikkoku is not in danger.
52	52	"Forgive Me Soichiro! Kyoko's Tearful Decision to Remarry"; Transliteration: "Yurushite Sōichirō! Kyōko Namida no Saikon Sengen" (Japanese: 許して惣一郎さん！響子涙の再婚宣言!!)	Kazuyoshi Katayama	Kazunori Itō	Masaaki Kannan	March 25, 1987
On the fourth anniversary of Soichiro's death the family gathers at the grave. When Kyoko returns she realizes she was so worried about her mother's nagging that she didn't give any thoughts to Soichiro at all. Few days later she decides to visit the grave by herself. As she is leaving she says she's going "to where Soichiro is." This worries Godai so much he decides to follow her.

=== Season 2 (1987–88) ===
No. overall	No. in season	Title	Directed by	Written by	Animation directed by	Original release date
53	1	"High-School Girl Power! A War Against Kyoko's Love"; Transliteration: "Joshi Kōsei Pawā Bakuhatsu Kyōko ni Koi no Sensen Fukoku" (Japanese: 女子高生パワー爆発響子に恋の宣戦布告)	Naoyuki Yoshinaga	Hiroshi Konishikawa	Atsuko Nakajima	April 8, 1987
Godai has entered a student teacher's program. For the next two weeks he'll be teaching at an all-girls high school, the very same school that Kyoko attended and where she met her husband. Godai has a rough start since he's so weak-willed that he has difficulty controlling the students. The class representative Yagami helps him out, but comes to think of him as a wimp. During a break, Godai gets an idea to find the old yearbooks to finally discover what Soichiro looked like. Yagami spies on him and in typical schoolgirl fashion, she romanticizes the situation and comes to believe that he's suffering over the death of an old girlfriend that attended this school. Now she's suddenly developed a crush on Godai. The next day Yagami gets her friends to accompany her with Godai so that she can visit his home. There Yagami meets Kyoko and starts to realize her relationship to Godai.
54	2	"Bare-Faced Attack! Operation Seduction"; Transliteration: "Hadaka Atakku! Godai Dashidashi Yūwaku Taisakusen!!" (Japanese: 裸でアタック！五代タジタジ誘惑大作戦!!)	Directed by : Yorifusa Yamaguchi; Storyboarded by : Tamiko Kojima	Hiroshi Konishikawa	Keizo Shimizu	April 15, 1987
Yagami tries to use her position as a class representative to get closer to Godai. When he is leaving the school she hands him a notebook supposedly outlining the classroom duties. When Godai is in his room he opens the book only to find the words "suki desu" (I love you) written on every page. The other residents find the book and get it into Kyoko's hands. The morning after, Godai leaves without the book. At the tennis club, Ichinose tells everything to Mitaka who offers to drop Kyoko off at the high school so that she can return the notebook to Godai. Meanwhile Yagami has managed to lure Godai into the gym equipment room and lock the door.
55	3	"Pajama-Girl Charges In! Maison Ikkoku in a Love Panic!"; Transliteration: "Totsugeki Pajama Musume! Ikkokukan wa Rabu Panikku" (Japanese: 突撃パジャマ娘！一刻館はラブパニック)	Iku Suzuki	Hideo Takayashiki	Kiichi Takaoka	April 22, 1987
With only two days left before Godai's student teaching stint ends, Yagami is almost out of time. She learns from Kamiogi-sensei about Kyoko and how she was in love with a student teacher at the school and ended up marrying him. She invites herself and her friends to Godai's place the next day as an informal good-bye. After a lively time, the Ikkoku residents see them off and realize that Yagami hasn't gone with them. Apparently she plans to sleep over. Eventually Yagami stays in Kyoko's room. She doesn't seem to mind since she wants to use the opportunity to talk to Kyoko alone about Godai and her being able to marry her teacher.
56	4	"Yagami is Determined: I Won't Give Up My First Love"; Transliteration: "Yagami no Kesshin! Akiramenai wa Hatsukoi Da Mono" (Japanese: 八神の決心！あきらめないわ初恋だもの)	Directed by : Osamu Sekita; Storyboarded by : Shunji Ôga	Hideo Takayashiki	Naohito Takahashi	April 29, 1987
The day after is the last day of Godai's student teaching. The news that Yagami stayed over at Godai's place spreads around the school. Yagami becomes flustered and so, while delivering the student evaluations to Godai, she tells him that she is over him. However when Godai is leaving school Yagami cries over him, and feels that if he can make her cry, he's worth falling in love with. Mitaka's Uncle tells him about a woman that he wants Mitaka to meet. When Kyoko doesn't react, Mitaka decides to accept the omiai.
57	5	"The Princess Cometh! Mitaka Is Her Prince Charming"; Transliteration: "Ojōsama Tōjō! Mitaka-kōchi ni Hitomebore" (Japanese: お嬢サマ登場！三鷹コーチにひとめぼれ)	Eisuke Kondo	Hiroshi Kaneko	Hiroshi Ogawa	May 6, 1987
This episode introduces Asuna Kujo, a daughter of a wealthy family. Mitaka meets with Asuna and her family and charmed by her old-fashioned demureness. Things however go south after he is introduced to her dogs. After the meeting, Asuna decides she wants to marry Mitaka because all of her dogs liked him. Mitaka confronts Kyoko and insists that she gives him a clear answer about their relationship within a week. A private detective is snooping around the Ikokku and is forced to buy everyone drinks. Godai gets a part-time work as a day-care worker in a kindergarten.
58	6	"Godai or Mitaka? A Woman's Heart Is on the Line"; Transliteration: "Godai ka Mitaka ka! Onna Gokoro wa Kon'ya ga Shōbu!!" (Japanese: 五代か三鷹か！女ごころは今夜が勝負!!)	Directed by : Iku Suzuki; Storyboarded by : Naoyuki Yoshinaga	Hideo Takayashiki	Atsuko Nakajima	May 13, 1987
Kyoko keeps encountering Asuna and her dogs. Asuna is trying to get her to break up with Mitaka but is too reserved to say anything. The day before Kyoko has to answer Mitaka's proposal she asks Godai to come home early as he is leaving for work. She wants him to tell her not to get married. That evening when Godai gets off work Sakamoto finds him and reminds him that they're supposed to be going to a mandatory class party. This leads to Godai and Sakamoto not to show up at Ikkoku-kan until around the crack of dawn. Kyoko had stayed up all night waiting for Godai so when she's waiting to meet up with Mitaka later in the day she falls asleep. Asuna finds her sleeping and she and her dogs prevent Mitaka from showing up.
59	7	"Be Still, My Beating Heart! Asuna Kujo's Very First Time"; Transliteration: "Doki! Kūjō Asuna Hajimete no Taiken!!" (Japanese: ドキッ！九条明日菜はじめての体験!!)	Directed by : Osamu Sekita; Storyboarded by : Naoyuki Yoshinaga	Hiroshi Kaneko	Masaaki Kannan	May 20, 1987
Kyoko feels guilty about falling asleep, but is also still mad with Godai. At his uncle's insistence Mitaka goes on a date with Asuna where he plans to break up with her. However her dogs show up and in his terror Mitaka hugs Asuna. She notes this is the first time a man has held her. Godai gets a voice tape from a little girl in his kindergarten who's got a crush on him asking him innocently to marry him. He gets an idea to do the same thing and records a heartfelt message for Kyoko. His answer to the little girl and Kyoko get mixed up.
60	8	"Caught in the Act! Kyoko and Mitaka, Hot and Heavy!"; Transliteration: "Michatta! Kyōko to Mitaka ga Ikinari Bi?!" (Japanese: 見ちゃった！響子と三鷹がいきなりB?!)	Directed by : Satoshi Yamamoto; Storyboarded by : Tamiko Kojima	Hiroshi Konishikawa	Atsuko Nakajima	May 27, 1987
After his run in with Asuna's dogs, Mitaka has been staying in bed. He calls Kyoko and guilt trips her into coming to his place with food. Godai follows but outside Mitaka's apartment he comes across Asuna who is looking for one of her dogs. Her dog managed to follow Kyoko inside. The dog climbs on Mitaka who faints and falls right no top of Kyoko. Asuna hears the dog yelping and she and Godai open Mitaka's door and see what appears to be Kyoko and Mitaka embracing. After that they both turn away and quietly leave. Godai stays overnight at Sakamoto's place. When he returns Kyoko tries to explain that it's a misunderstanding, but he doesn't listen. Godai catches Kyoko crying as she turns away.
61	9	"Chase After Me, Godai. Kyoko's Lone Trip"; Transliteration: "Oikakete Godai-san; Kyōko Shitsuren Hitori Tabi" (Japanese: 追いかけて五代さん響子失恋ひとり旅)	Directed by : Yorifusa Yamaguchi; Storyboarded by : Kazunori Tanahashi	Hiroshi Konishikawa	Keizo Shimizu	June 10, 1987
Kyoko gets a letter of apology from Mitaka who vows never to see her until he confronts the source of his problems (his dog phobia). She decides go on a trip to forget her troubles. Godai discusses with Sakamoto what happened and Sakamoto concludes that Kyoko cried because she loves Godai. Godai hurries home to clear things up but Kyoko has already gone and left a travel schedule on her door. Godai chases after her. While touring in the town of Kanazawa, Kyoko meets a woman who has her own troubles. Godai is in the town at the same time but never manages to find Kyoko.
62	10	"Alright! In the Bath with Kyoko! Just the Two in an Open Bath"; Transliteration: "Yatta! Kyōko to no Kon'yoku Rotenburo de Futarikiri" (Japanese: ヤッタ！響子と混浴露天ぶろで二人きり)	Satoshi Yamamoto	Hideo Takayashiki	Naohito Takahashi	June 17, 1987
Kyoko checks into an inn. Godai had been looking for her and is coincidentally staying at the same inn. Kyoko decides try out the open air hot spring. After she undresses and goes out, she discovers to her dismay that there's no wall between the male and female sides. Godai is on the other side and has spent too long in the hot water and is beginning to pass out. Kyoko rescues him and the inn staff bring him to her room to recover. When Godai wakes up he pretends their meeting was a coincidence which disappoints Kyoko. Kyoko explains to Godai what happened in Mitaka's apartment. They talk well into the night and Godai falls asleep. Kyoko's relieved she met with him and goes to hug him, but the phone rings. It's Ichinose who tells her that the water pipes are leaking water everywhere, so Kyoko returns home right away. Godai wakes up the next morning to find her gone and wonders if he did anything to make her leave. Meanwhile Kyoko arrives back at Ikkoku-kan and finds out from the tenants that Godai really did follow her which makes her gush with happiness.
63	11	"Yagami's Back by the Time She's Forgotten"; Transliteration: "Pawafuru Yagami ga Wasureta Goro ni Yattekita!" (Japanese: パワフル八神が忘れた頃にやって来た！)	Directed by : Iku Suzuki; Storyboarded by : Satoshi Yamamoto	Yutaka Kaneko	Atsuko Nakajima	June 24, 1987
64	12	"Godai on the Edge! The Sweet Trap of a High School Girl"; Transliteration: "Godai-kun Makesō! Joshi Kōsei no Amai Wana!!" (Japanese: 五代くん負けそう！女子高校生の甘い罠!!)	Eisuke Kondo	Yutaka Kaneko	Hiroshi Ogawa	July 1, 1987
65	13	"Yagami's Scream! Yotsuya's Dangerous Tutoring!"; Transliteration: "Yagami Sekkyō! Kiken na Yotsuya no Kojin Jugyō!!" (Japanese: 八神絶叫！キケンな四谷の個人授業!!)	Directed by : Osamu Sekita; Storyboarded by : Tamiko Kojima	Hiroshi Konishikawa	Masaaki Kannan	July 8, 1987
66	14	"Yagami's Challenge! I Musn't Lose Against the Widow!"; Transliteration: "Yagami no Chōsen! Mibōjin Nanka ni Makenai wa" (Japanese: 八神の挑戦！未亡人なんかに負けないわ)	Iku Suzuki	Hideo Takayashiki	Atsuko Nakajima	July 15, 1987
67	15	"Even Yagami is Confused! Grandma Yukari Returns With Golden Teeth!!"; Transliteration: "Yagami mo Azan! Yukari Bā-chan Kinba Sanjō!!" (Japanese: 八神もア然！ゆかり婆ちゃん金歯で参上!!)	Satoshi Yamamoto	Hideo Takayashiki	Shunji Suzuki	July 22, 1987
68	16	"Grandma Yukari's Fighting Spirit. Hot Baseball Match!"; Transliteration: "Tōkon Yukari Bā-chan Korezo Nekketsu Kusayakyū!" (Japanese: 闘魂ゆかり婆ちゃんこれぞ熱血草野球！)	Eisuke Kondo	Hiroshi Konishikawa	Hiroshi Ogawa	July 29, 1987
69	17	"Underwater Battle. Suspicious Kiss Mark on Godai"; Transliteration: "Suichū Tairantō! Godai ni Giwaku no Kisu Māku!!" (Japanese: 水中大乱闘！五代に疑惑のキスマーク!!)	Directed by : Iku Suzuki; Storyboarded by : Satoshi Yamamoto	Yutaka Kaneko	Atsuko Nakajima	August 5, 1987
70	18	"Goodbye Grandma! Ueno Station is Party Panic"; Transliteration: "Saraba Bā-chan! Ueno Eki wa Enkai Panikku" (Japanese: さらば婆ちゃん！上野駅は宴会パニック)	Directed by : Chisato Shigeki; Storyboarded by : Tamiko Kojima	Hideo Takayashiki	Masaaki Kannan	August 12, 1987
71	19	"A Midsummer Night's Dream. Has Godai Already Found a Job?"; Transliteration: "Manatsu no Yoru no Yume? Godai Hayaku mo Shūshoku Kettei?!" (Japanese: 真夏の夜の夢？五代早くも就職決定か?!)	Directed by : Iku Suzuki; Storyboarded by : Naoyuki Yoshinaga	Hiroshi Konishikawa	Atsuko Nakajima	August 19, 1987
72	20	"A Child is Born? Godai's Life of Joy and Tears!"; Transliteration: "Akachan Tanjō? Godai no Nakiwarai Jinsei!" (Japanese: 赤ちゃん誕生？五代の泣き笑い人生!)	Satoshi Yamamoto	Yutaka Kaneko	Shunji Suzuki	August 26, 1987
73	21	"Ikkoku-kan Hostage Crisis. Yagami's Big Nuisance!"; Transliteration: "Ikkokukan Hitojichi Sōdō! Yagami no Ōki na Osewasama" (Japanese: 一刻館人質騒動！八神の大きなお世話様)	Eisuke Kondo	Hiroshi Konishikawa	Masaaki Kannan	September 2, 1987
74	22	"Change in Employment Front. Godai's Last Come Back."; Transliteration: "Shūshoku Sensen Ijō Ari! Godai Sayonara Ōgyakuten" (Japanese: 就職戦線異状あり！五代サヨナラ大逆転)	Directed by : Iku Suzuki; Storyboarded by : Tamiko Kojima	Yutaka Kaneko	Atsuko Nakajima	September 9, 1987
75	23	"Love All the Way. Yagami and Asuna Never Give Up."; Transliteration: "Koi Hitosuji! Yagami to Asuna wa Korinai Onna" (Japanese: 恋ひとすじ！八神と明日菜は懲りない女)	Directed by : Chisato Shigeki; Storyboarded by : Naoyuki Yoshinaga	Hideo Takayashiki	Masaaki Kannan	September 16, 1987
76	24	"I'll Wait. Kyoko's Sudden Announcement"; Transliteration: "Watashi Matsu wa! Kyōko Totsuzen no Imishin Sengen" (Japanese: ワタシ待つわ！響子突然のイミシン宣言)	Directed by : Iku Suzuki; Storyboarded by : Tamiko Kojima	Hideo Takayashiki	Atsuko Nakajima	September 23, 1987
Mitaka tells Kyoko he has ended the marriage talks with Asuna. When Soichiro's death anniversary arrives again, Godai hears Mitaka asking for the location of the grave. Godai hurries to the graveyard, where he finds Mitaka offering incense and flowers. The two men hide when Kyoko's family arrives. Kyoko admits she's considering marrying again, much to her mother's delight. Mitaka introduces himself and is quickly invited to coffee. Later, Kyoko notices Godai hiding. Irritated he's been eavesdropping, she tells him she won't be marrying anyone, at least until next spring.
77	25	"Bravo Godai! The Pride of a Man"; Transliteration: "Appare Godai! Tama ni Misemasu Otoko no Iji" (Japanese: あっぱれ五代！たまに見せます男の意地)	Satoshi Yamamoto	Hiroshi Konishikawa & Hideo Takayashiki	Shunji Suzuki	October 14, 1987
Yagami keeps living at the Maison Ikkoku as her father refuses to write another letter of recommendation for Godai. Meanwhile, Godai has been put in charge of preparing a festival at his preschool and everyone at Maison Ikkoku helps him to make toys and decorations. Yagami manages to pester her father to write another letter, but when he arrives, Godai refuses to accept the letter and tells Yagami to go home. The festival goes well, and Godai begins to feel more secure in his decision.
78	26	"It's a Secret! Godai's Work Diary"; Transliteration: "Sore wa Himitsu Desu! Godai no Baito Funtōki" (Japanese: それは秘密です！五代のバイト奮闘記!!)	Directed by : Chisato Shigeki; Storyboarded by : Naoyuki Yoshinaga	Hiroshi Konishikawa	Atsuko Nakajima	October 21, 1987
Sakamoto has found employment and he and Godai to out for a drink to celebrate. At a hostess club called Bunny Cabaret they run out of money and are forced to work as promoters to pay their tab. Sakamoto soon ditches Godai and leaves him with the work. Yotsua finds out about Godai's seedy job and blackmails Godai into letting him drink at Godai's expense or he'll tell Kyoko, who thinks Godai is busy job hunting. Things get worse the next night when Yotsua brings Mrs. Ichinose and Akemi with him.
79	27	"I'm Sorry Kyoko-san. Guilt Trip Homemade Lunch"; Transliteration: "Kyōko-san Gomen ne! Namida Namida no Aisai Bentō?!" (Japanese: 響子さんゴメンネ！涙・涙の愛妻弁当?!)	Directed by : Eisuke Kondo; Storyboarded by : Tamiko Kojima	Yutaka Kaneko & Hideo Takayashiki	Masaaki Kannan	October 28, 1987
Godai quits the hostess club. When he tells Kyoko that he's considering a career as a preschool teacher, she seems happy with the decision. Kyoko gets a phone call from Godai's grandmother, who is concerned that he isn't eating enough. Godai loses his job at the preschool; however the morning after, when Kyoko presents him with a bento to take to work, he can't bring himself to tell her. Godai returns to his job at the Bunny Cabaret. Yagami learns that Godai is longer working at the preschool and manages to dig up where he is working.
80	28	"Godai in Panic! Yagami the Bunny Girl!!"; Transliteration: "Godai Dokkiri! Totsuzen Yagami no Banī Gāru!!" (Japanese: 五代ドッキリ！突然八神のバニーガール!!)	Satoshi Yamamoto	Yutaka Kaneko	Atsuko Nakajima	November 4, 1987
Yagami goes to the Bunny Cabaret and offers to work there to pay Godai's debt, but gets kicked out when Godai reveals she's a high schooler. Mitaka calls Kyoko and invites her out for dinner. Afterwards, when Kyoko and Mitaka are returning, she notices Godai, in a happi, standing outside the club attracting customers. When Godai comes home he tries to talk with Kyoko, but she says she already knows. One of Godai's former coworkers stops by Ikkoku to drop off a study guide for the teacher's certification exam and tells Kyoko that Godai was well liked, but was not needed after a teacher in a full time position was hired. Kyoko forgives Godai, but tells him to be more honest with her.
81	29	"The Tenacity of Love. Asuna Never Gives Up After All"; Transliteration: "Ai no Shūnen! Asuna wa Yappari Korinai Onna" (Japanese: 愛の執念！明日菜はやっぱり懲りない女)	Iku Suzuki	Hideo Takayashiki	Masaaki Kannan	November 11, 1987
Kyoko's mother calls her husband and wants to arrange a meeting with Mitaka's parents, but he wants nothing to do with it. To Mitaka's chagrin, Asuna has entered his tennis school as a new student and he realizes he never formally broke off discussions with her parents. When Mitaka goes to the Kujo household, he finds his parents and uncle there. Unwilling to make a scene, he says nothing. Kasumi, one of the girls working in the hostess club, has run away with a customer and left her two young children with Godai.
82	30	"Perfect Dad! Godai-kun's Child Care Story"; Transliteration: "Manten Papa! Godai-kun no Kosodate Sutōrī" (Japanese: 満点パパ！五代くんの子育てストーリー)	Chisato Shigeki	Hideo Takayashiki	Shunji Suzuki	November 18, 1987
Kyoko and Mrs. Ichinose help Godai take care of the children. Godai finds Kasumi at her apartment, where she explains she is going on a trip for a week to try to snag a husband. She then makes her escape, leaving Godai behind. Kyoko agrees to meet up with her parents, unaware she is being set up to meet Mitaka's parents.
83	31	"Yokohama Chaser. Kyoko-san's Going Away?!"; Transliteration: "Oikakete Yokohama Kyōko-san ga Nigeru?!" (Japanese: 追いかけてヨコハマ響子さんが逃げる?!)	Directed by : Eisuke Kondo; Storyboarded by : Tamiko Kojima	Hiroshi Konishikawa	Masaaki Kannan	November 25, 1987
Kyoko sets off to meet her parents but is surprised when Mitaka comes to pick her up. As they arrive at the restaurant, they discover that Taro, Kasumi's son, has tagged along. When Mitaka's parents arrive, Kyoko understands she has been deceived. She calls Godai to let him know about Taro and Godai senses something is wrong and decides to come to her rescue. As Godai arrives, he confronts Mitaka, but Kyoko is in the courtyard ignorant of what is going on. Eventually Mitaka eludes Godai and drives off with Kyoko and Godai is forced to return to Ikkoku with Taro. Later that evening, Kyoko and Mitaka are sitting in a hotel bar when Mitaka says he has booked a room for the night.
84	32	"1000% Suspicion. Kyoko's Scandal Night"; Transliteration: "Giwaku 1000% Kyōko no Sukandaru Naito" (Japanese: 疑惑1000%響子のスキャンダルナイト)	Directed by : Iku Suzuki; Storyboarded by : Naoyuki Yoshinaga	Hiroshi Konishikawa	Atsuko Nakajima	December 2, 1987
Mitaka tries to push Kyoko to make a decision, but when she breaks down in tears, he sees he's gone too far and calls a cab for her. Back at Ikkoku, Godai hopefully waits for Kyoko when Kyoko's father pulls up. He had always opposed his wife's scheming so the two spend the night looking for her. When they return Godai tries to ask Kyoko about the night but she becomes annoyed that he doesn't trust her. Taro worries that Kasumi isn't coming back for him and his sister. When he pages her, she stumbles down the stairs. She had been there since the previous night but got caught up partying with the tenants. Mitaka practices alone on the tennis court and worries things are over between him and Kyoko.
85	33	"This Is the Critical Point! Godai and Mitaka's Duel of Fate!"; Transliteration: "Koko ga Shōnenba! Godai to Mitaka Shukumei Taiketsu" (Japanese: ここが正念場！五代と三鷹宿命の対決)	Koji Sawai	Hideo Takayashiki	Masaaki Kannan	December 9, 1987
As Godai prepares for his final exams, the rest of the tenants continue to party. Meanwhile, Mitaka is still recovering from the disappointing trip to Yokohama with Kyoko. She has decided it would be best to stay away from the tennis courts for a while, although Asuna is still coming on a regular basis. She overhears the housewives discussing Mitaka's recent meeting with Kyoko's parents and is shocked to hear that Shun is meeting with another woman when his Uncle has assured her family that the engagement between them was proceeding well. Asuna decides to go to Maison Ikkoku to confront Kyoko but instead runs into Godai. When Yusaku sees her crying he decides to go to Mitaka and tell him about the problems he is causing. When they meet Mitaka is in no mood to talk and the two decide to settle things once and for all, with their fists. The entire night is spent looking for a place to hold their much anticipated slugfest, but a determined police officer continues to interrupt them and the pair finally end up drinking their problems away. When Godai finally leaves, he finds Kyoko waiting for him at the train station. Upon seeing him drunk she slaps him hard across the face. Meanwhile, Mitaka stumbles home to find Asuna at the door of his apartment.
86	34	"Shocking One Night! Asuna's Salad Day"; Transliteration: "Shōgeki no Ichiya! Asuna no Sarada Kinenbi?!" (Japanese: 衝撃の一夜！明日菜のサラダ記念日?!)	Directed by : Chisato Shigeki; Storyboarded by : Naoyuki Yoshinaga	Hideo Takayashiki	Atsuko Nakajima	December 16, 1987
Mitaka asks Asuna why she is there, and she learns that he never wanted to be engaged to her in the first place. Hurt but brave, she agrees to end things and walks away. Shun drunkenly opens his apartment door and passes out in the entrance. Asuna returns to get her dog, Salade and finds him asleep on the floor. Generously helping him inside, Mitaka pulls her down and lays on top of her, kissing her. The next morning, Asuna leaves after putting Shun to bed and making him breakfast. Her driver, Kimita, promises that he will keep everything that happened a secret from her family. When Mitaka wakes up he can barely remember what happened the night before, but he does know that he kissed Asuna. Meanwhile, things aren't going well at Maison Ikkoku for Godai. Kyoko is ignoring him and has told everyone that she slapped him the night before. They all take her side, but she quickly cools off when Godai doesn't come home after his final. When he finally does arrive he tells everyone that he won't be staying. Yusaku has decided to stay at the Cabaret until he has completed his tests and graduated from school. Meanwhile, Mitaka fears that he may have gone too far and slept with Asuna and seeks her out. He ends up following her to Izu where he learns that she did in fact stay all night, but that she will not force him into marriage just because of what happened between them.
87	35	"Asuna's Pregnant? Mitaka's Surprise Marriage Announcement"; Transliteration: "Asuna ga Ninshin? Mitaka Bikkuri Kekkon Sengen" (Japanese: 明日菜が妊娠？三鷹びっくり結婚宣言!!)	Directed by : Eisuke Kondo; Storyboarded by : Tamiko Kojima	Yutaka Kaneko	Masaaki Kannan	December 23, 1987
As Mitaka arrives in Izu he clumsily asks Asuna what happened between the two of them at his apartment. She reassures him and he's grateful to learn he didn't do anything too uncouth. Back in Tokyo however Asuna's mother learns from Kimita that Asuna spent the night with Mitaka, and is furious to learn that her daughter is now 'damaged goods.' Asuna clarifies what happened much to her mother's delight. Outside Asuna is approached by the family veterinarian who tells her that Salad is pregnant. Asuna is overjoyed and rushes to the tennis courts to tell Mitaka. However, her explanation is unclear and Shun (and everyone else on the courts) think that Asuna is pregnant. Mrs. Ichinose goes back to Maison Ikkoku to tell Kyoko the news while Shun is beyond depressed and realizes that he has no choice but to marry Asuna now. Not knowing what else to do he visits Kyoko at Ikkoku and the pair end up sitting quietly on a hill. Mitaka tells her goodbye and Kyoko tells him that she hopes he'll be happy. The parting is sad, especially for Mitaka who feels lost and trapped. A few days later at his engagement ceremony with Asuna, he learns the truth about the pregnancy and is devastated. Word spreads quickly that Asuna is not pregnant, but her dog Salade and by now it is too late, Shun is already officially engaged to be married. On the tennis courts Mitaka and Kyoko continue to see each other and she nervously tells him that she still hopes he'll find some way to be happy.
88	36	"Love All Over... The Lingering Taste of Kozue's Kisses"; Transliteration: "Ai Futatabi? Kozue ga Nokoshita Kisu no Aji!!" (Japanese: 愛ふたたび？こずえが残したキスの味!!)	Iku Suzuki	Yutaka Kaneko	Shunji Suzuki	January 6, 1988
As Godai attempts to finish up another day of studying at the cabaret Mitaka arrives looking extremely angry. Godai and he go to a nearby park with two children that Yusaku is taking care of. Godai tells Mitaka that he heard what happened with Asuna and that he hopes things will be okay for he and Asuna. Mitaka is too angry and doesn't want Godai's pity. Even though he doesn't want to be with Asuna he tells Godai that he knows he doesn't have a choice and will have to go through with the wedding. Mitaka painfully attempts to cheer Godai on but can't bring himself to do it. Mitaka ends up walking off even more angry than he was when he arrived. Later that night he and Asuna have dinner with his family and Asuna realizes that he is not happy. Looking through an old photo album she sees Shun as a little boy, upset at losing a tennis tournament, but putting on a brave face in a photo. She realizes that this false smile from his boyhood is the same smile that he uses around her. When they are alone she confronts him with this but instead of getting upset she tells a joke to put him at ease. Mitaka laughs and smiles at her. Taking her hand in his he promises that they will make their own happiness from now on. Silently he tells Kyoko goodbye as he prepares to begin his life with Asuna. Meanwhile Kozue is having dinner with a co-worker from her bank. Out of nowhere the man shows her his bank book and asks her to marry him. Kozue is completely shocked and tells him that she'll need a few days to think about it. Instantly her mind goes to Godai and she decides she needs to see him. Not knowing where he is she goes to Maison Ikkoku and sees Kyoko and the other tenants for the first time in a long while. Kyoko is taking a few good luck charms from the tenants to Godai and agrees to take Kozue with her to the cabaret. When they arrive Kyoko quickly wants to leave, but is talked into staying by Godai and Iioka. Kozue learns that Godai has been busy studying for his final exams, and decides that now isn't the best time to burden him with her marriage dilemma. Instead she tells him that they can talk about it later, but she asks him to lean down and close his eyes. Doing as she asks, he is shocked when he suddenly feels Kozue's lips on his. For the first time in their relationship they have kissed, and as luck would have it Kyoko just so happens to be walking back to Maison Ikkoku and sees the whole thing.
89	37	"Love Forlorn! Today is IT for Godai and Kyoko"; Transliteration: "Musubarenu Ai! Godai to Kyōko Kyō de Owakare?" (Japanese: 結ばれぬ愛！五代と響子今日でお別れ?)	Koji Sawai	Hiroshi Konishikawa	Atsuko Nakajima	January 13, 1988
As Godai arrives back at Maison Ikkoku his finals are finally over, but he is shocked to find that Kyoko isn't as welcoming as he had expected her to be. That night as the other tenants celebrate, Kyoko is quiet. Everyone asks why she's angry but she refuses to say anything. A phone call interrupts the conversation and gives the other tenants a chance to question Godai. He realizes that maybe she saw he and Kozue, and when she comes back and tells him that its Kozue on the phone, he is more sure than ever that this is the cause of her ire. Kozue asks if she can meet with Godai now that finals are over. And the next day at a café, Kozue tells Godai about her friend's proposal and begins to cry, telling him that she didn't know what to do. Godai tries to calm her and tells her that he plans on asking someone important to him to marry him as soon as he graduates. Kozue thinks he means her and becomes very excited, instantly deciding that she'll turn down the other man to be with Godai. Before he has a chance to set Kozue straight she excitedly runs out to make it to work on time. Godai is more frustrated than ever and things only get worse as he gets back to Maison Ikkoku. Kyoko is sitting outside and decides to confront him about kissing Kozue. He tells her that he wasn't the one who kissed her, but Kyoko refuses to believe him. The two begin to yell at one another when Godai holds his hands in front of him and asks Kyoko to close her eyes, the same trick that Kozue used on him when she kissed him. Kyoko quickly realizes what he is trying to do and tells him how stupid he is for falling for that. Godai agrees and becomes frustrated, but Kyoko turns the tables on him, telling him to close his eyes. However instead of kissing him she tugs on his cheeks. Godai sighs, but Kyoko then tells him to turn around and close his eyes. He does as he is told and Kyoko slowly sneaks around in front of him and kisses him before running inside. Godai screams in excitement and runs up to his room, ready to tell Kozue once and for all that Kyoko is the only woman for him. Yotsuya interrupts him however and mentions the annual New Year's Eve party at Chachamaru. Godai happily agrees to go and looks forward to seeing Kyoko again that evening. That night, everyone is enjoying themselves and the tenants point out how happy Kyoko seems to be with Godai now. Suddenly Kozue rushes inside the bar. Crying she tells Godai that she just couldn't tell her friend that she didn't want to marry him even though she does want to marry Godai. Upon hearing this Kyoko runs up and slaps Yusaku before leaving Chachamaru. Godai chases after her but she no longer wants to hear his excuses and tells him to move out. He says that he will not move out under any circumstances. Frustrated by this, Kyoko goes back to Maison Ikkoku alone and packs her backs. Early the next morning while everyone else is asleep she moves out of Maison Ikkoku, quitting her job as manager.
90	38	"Kyoko Retires! Ikkoku, a Distant Memory?"; Transliteration: "Kyōko-san Intai! Ikkokukan wa Tōi Omoide?" (Japanese: 響子さん引退！一刻館は遠い想い出？)	Chisato Shigeki	Hiroshi Konishikawa	Masaaki Kannan	January 20, 1988
Godai learns that Kyoko has moved out and explains the Kozue situation to the other tenants. They tell him to go get Kyoko to come back to Maison Ikkoku and tell him that they won't let him come back until Kyoko has returned. Godai goes to the Chigusa's and attempts to see Kyoko but she refuses. When he loudly shouts that everything was a mistake she rushes into the foyer and pushes him out the door, telling him that she never wants to see him again. When Godai returns to Ikkoku he finds himself locked out and attempts to climb in through Kentaro's window to get inside. Over the next five days Godai goes to see Kyoko everyday, while her father decides to take it upon himself to tell Mr. Otonashi that Kyoko will not be returning to Maison Ikkoku. Mr. Otonashi goes to Maison Ikkoku to tell the tenants the news and finds the entire building in a state of disarray. The floors are covered in garbage and the tenants begin to tell him how inconvient Kyoko's absence has been for them (as she cleans up after them all the time). With no other choice he hires a new temporary manager: Godai! The next day he calls Kyoko to tell her the news, and upon hearing that she's been replaced she begins to have second thoughts about her impulsive decision to leave Maison Ikkoku.
91	39	"Kyoko's Big Shock! Akemi and Godai Together?!"; Transliteration: "Kyōko Gakusa! Akemi to Godai wa Iganai no Kankei?!" (Japanese: 響子ガク然！朱美と五代は意外な関係?!)	Directed by : Koji Sawai; Storyboarded by : Tamiko Kojima	Hideo Takayashiki	Atsuko Nakajima	January 27, 1988
Kyoko has stopped talking to her father because of him going to Mr. Otonashi without telling her. As fate would have it she is so mad that she ends up deciding to go back to Maison Ikkoku to talk to the new manager. On her way back she stops in at Chachamaru and finds Yotsuya, Akemi and Mrs. Ichinose drinking. They tease her about leaving and Akemi takes things too far by telling her that if Kyoko doesn't come back then she'll go after Godai herself. Kyoko angrily tells her that she should and leaves in a huff. Before she goes back home she stops at Maison Ikkoku to see Godai cleaning the front walkway. Realizing that he's the manager puts her at ease and convinces her to go back home. Later, that night Godai gets a call at work from Akemi. She's in a love hotel with no money and needs him to come bail her out. Threatening to kill herself if he doesn't Godai rushes over and finds a drunken Akemi in room 302. As the two leave the love hotel they just happen to run into Kozue and a group of her friends on the street. Shocked at seeing Godai leaving the hotel with another woman Kozue silently walks away, thinking they spent the night together. The next day Akemi tells Godai that he should be grateful that she helped him end things with Kozue, but Yusaku can't help but feel badly about the way things ended between them. Calling Kozue doesn't work however and so it seems that their relationship is doomed to end on a sad note. That day Mrs. Ichinose visits Kyoko at her parents' apartment and tells her that the whole Kozue proposal was a misunderstanding and that she should come home. Kyoko is finally convinced and packs her bags. However on the way back to Ikkoku Kyoko runs into Kozue and the two begin to talk. Kozue breaks down in tears and tells Kyoko about seeing Godai and Akemi leave the love hotel together. Back at Maison Ikkoku the tenants are waiting for Kyoko to arrive.
92	40	"Wedding Bells for Kozue! Is Godai's Love Eternal?!"; Transliteration: "Kozue-chan Kekkon! Godai no Ai wa Eien ni?!" (Japanese: こずえちゃん結婚！五代の愛は永遠に?!)	Iku Suzuki	Hideo Takayashiki	Shunji Suzuki	February 3, 1988
Kyoko walks up Clock Hill back to Maison Ikkoku remembering that Akemi told her that she was going to seduce Godai. Instead of going to Ikkoku she goes to Chachamaru to confront Akemi. As she builds up her nerve Akemi calls the other tenants to let them know that Kyoko is there with her. By the time they get there Akemi has already told Kyoko that it's true that she and Godai were seen by Kozue at a love hotel. Kyoko is on the verge of tears and can't take anymore pain. She gets up to leave but Akemi stops her and tells her how childish she's been, how she never lets Godai even hold her hand yet she thinks she can be so tough with him. As she runs out, Akemi tells Godai to go after her. He does and the two of them walk and talk for a while, Kyoko tells him that she doesn't feel like she can trust him anymore when he finally tells her that she is missing the most important part, that he loves her, and that he's loved her since he first met her. Kyoko is shocked after hearing this. The two separate with Kyoko going back to Maison Ikkoku, remembering about Godai telling her about being the only woman in his life, implying how tired she is being the way she is, that she should be more trustful with herself while Godai goes to work. On a train in the city, Kozue runs into Yotsuya. He tells her that the whole thing with Akemi was a misunderstanding. Kozue feels awful about how things have ended with Godai and so she goes to see him at the Bunny Cabaret. There they begin to talk before Iioka reminds Godai of how unprofessional he's being. As Godai walks Kozue home she begins to cry and asks him not to hate her, Godai gets down on his knees and begins to beg her not to hate him either. Godai finally confesses that he's in love with someone else and that he should have told Kozue much sooner. Kozue smiles and sits on the ground with him, showing Yusaku her engagement ring. After the incident with Akemi she accepted her co-worker's proposal. Kozue and Godai spend then next few minutes talking about the man she will marry before Kozue gets in a cab. Right before she leaves she asks about the woman Godai loves, but decides its best not to know. The two leave each other forever, with Godai thinking how Kyoko is and how she makes him feel.
93	41	"Sight of Spring? The Two's Hearts are in Warm Feeling!!"; Transliteration: "Haruka no Yokan? Futari no Kokoro wa Atsui Tokimeki!!" (Japanese: 春の予感？ふたりの心は熱いトキメキ!!)	Directed by : Eisuke Kondo; Storyboarded by : Naoyuki Yoshinaga	Hideo Takayashiki	Masaaki Kannan	February 10, 1988
Kyoko walks Soichiro and remembers Godai telling her that he's been in love with her. Back at Ikkoku the tenants tell Godai that they'll have a consolation party for him if he doesn't end up graduating. Kyoko arrives just in time to ask Godai to let her know how he did. At school Godai quickly learns that he's graduated! The rest of the day is spent trying to call Maison Ikkoku to let Kyoko know how he did. Everyone is planning a "better luck next time" party and keep missing his phone calls. Everyone at the cabaret is happy to learn that Yusaku passed, and later that night he finally gets back to Maison Ikkoku to share the good news. During the party Akemi begins to argue with Kyoko again and brings up how Godai will never be able to overcome Soichiro in Kyoko's eyes. Kyoko begins to cry and leaves and Godai tries to follow but she locks herself in her room. The next day Godai goes out job hunting and meets a single father whose wife has recently left he and his son. While Godai doesn't get that job (as it was given to that father, who needed the income), he does tell Kyoko how well it went for him and she seems proud. The two discuss her memories of Soichiro and they finally have an honest discussion of how Godai has felt all these years trying to live in Soichiro's shadow. As the snow begins to fall outside of Maison Ikkoku, Kyoko tells Godai that she'll never be able to forget her husband but that she wants to make her own way together with Yusaku. They begin to kiss and turn out the lights, spending their first night together. The next morning all the tenants noticed that Kyoko is in a particularly good mood, and is even happier when Godai calls to tell her he's gotten a job at his old workplace, the Acorn Daycare. Just as he's about to propose, his pay phone runs out of money.
94	42	"Alright! Godai-kun's Courageous Proposal!"; Transliteration: "Yattaze! Godai-kun Kesshi no Puropōzu!!" (Japanese: やったぜ！五代くん決死のプロポーズ!!)	Iku Suzuki	Hiroshi Konishikawa	Atsuko Nakajima	February 17, 1988
Kyoko goes to visit her sick father, and finds that he's very ill. When her mother asks Kyoko how things are going between Godai and her at Maison Ikkoku, she nervously tells them they would find out sooner or later. While her mother is thrilled, her father is furious, and when she is questioned if she is going to remmary, Kyoko answers them she will, although Godai hasn't proposed to her yet. At the Acorn Daycare Godai listen to his co-workers discussing marriage and decides he'd best begin to think about how he will propose to Kyoko. Kyoko has been wondering the same thing herself and keeps waiting and waiting for Godai to get around to asking. Her father is deadset against Kyoko getting married again and suddenly disappears from his sickbed in an attempt to do something about it. Kyoko calls Godai at the daycare to get him to look out for Mr. Chigusa should he show up, but later that night Godai is at the Bunny Cabaret and there is still no sign of him. That night just so happens to be Godai's last night at the cabaret and as he is giving the children presents that he's made for them, Mr. Chigusa arrives and promptly passes out. After waking up and having a few drinks with Godai's co-workers at his going-away party, Mr. Chigusa passes out drunk. As they walk back to Kyoko's parents house, Godai decides now is the time to propose to Kyoko. He asks her to marry him and she stops in her tracks and asks him to promise her just one thing; that he will outlive her. After losing Soichiro she knows she can't go through being alone again. Godai swears, and Mr. Chigusa wakes up and tells Kyoko that even if something happened she could always come back home, that she'll never be alone. Kyoko cries and hugs Godai and her father.
95	43	"Ah, Excitement! Grandma's Love Embosomed in the Ring"; Transliteration: "Aa Kandō! Yubiwa ni Kometa Baa-chan no Ai" (Japanese: ああ感動！指輪に込めたばあちゃんの愛)	Koji Sawai	Yutaka Kaneko	Masaaki Kannan	February 24, 1988
Kyoko and Godai are settling into their new relationship as the day of Mitaka and Asuna's wedding finally arrives. No one from Maison Ikkoku attends, but the traditional Western ceremony is beautiful. Back at Maison Ikkoku the tenants tease Godai about his plans with Kyoko. When he hesitates they strongly suggest in their unique way that he take her to meet his parents in Niigata. At dinner that night Yusaku mentions the idea and Kyoko says she would love to meet them. After a call to his grandmother the pair leave for the northern part of Japan the next day. Upon arriving, Godai is irritated to find that his parents' restaurant is still open. Yukari explains that it was her idea, and that Kyoko should get to know the real family in their everyday working life. The restaurant is busy which leaves little time for visiting, but Kyoko happily pitches in and serves as a waitress. Meanwhile, Yukari gives Godai her old engagement ring and tells him that she wants to loan him the money for the wedding as well. Moved by his grandmother's kindness, Kyoko is tearfully welcomed into the family. As everyone finally settles in for the night a knock on the door summons the arrival of the rest of the Maison Ikkoku tenants, whom Yukari invited to join in with the celebration.
96	44	"As Long as this Love Lasts! Ikkoku-kan is Forever...!!"; Transliteration: "Kono Ai Aru Kagiri! Ikkokukan wa Eien ni...!!" (Japanese: この愛ある限り！一刻館は永遠に...!!)	Directed by : Chisato Shigeki; Storyboarded by : Naoyuki Yoshinaga	Hideo Takayashiki	Atsuko Nakajima	March 3, 1988
With their wedding fast approaching Kyoko and Godai are both cleaning out their rooms in preparation for moving in together; Godai is moving into the manager's room with Kyoko (so he's tossing out things he doesn't need, while Kyoko is making room for his belongings). Kyoko finds an old box of Soichiro's personal items and Akemi and Mrs. Ichinose share it with Godai. Kyoko is embarrassed but Godai smiles politely and admits he has never seen a picture of Kyoko's late husband before and that he looks like a very kind man. That night both Kyoko and he are thinking about Soichiro. Kyoko decides that she is going to return Soichiro's belongings to his father, and Godai begins to wonder if he can measure up to the memory of her beloved first husband. The next day, Kyoko visits Soichiro's grave to pay her final respects and finds Godai there, praying. Yusaku tells Soichiro that he hopes to have his blessing for their marriage. Kyoko is moved to tears, and the couple stand before Soichiro's graves holding hands, ready to move ahead with their new life together. No one can contain their excitement as Yusaku and Kyoko's wedding day has arrived. Everyone comes to pay their respects and to get a look at the happy couple. Kyoko is beautiful in her wedding dress, and both Mr. Chigusa and Mr. Otonashi are in tears just from looking at her. Ikuko and Kentaro meet again after not seeing each other for a long time, and Sakamoto even cuts out of work to attend. Later at the reception Mitaka and Asuna arrive after a visit to the hospital. Asuna is very pregnant, and she and Shun are extremely happy together. Godai gives a speech thanking everyone for taking care of him all these years and asks for their continued support. The story flashes forward as Yusaku reveals the fates of Kozue; she is seen at the end living in Nagoya with her husband, Yagami; she is attending an all women's college still hanging into the dream that she can be with Yusaku; Shun, who is married to Asuna Kujo. They have twin girls, Moe and Mie Mitaka, and an unborn child on the way, Akemi ends up marrying her boss, known only as "Master", and lives with him on the second floor of the Cha-Cha Maru. Finally everyone arrives back at Maison Ikkoku anxiously awaiting Yusaku and Kyoko's return from the hospital. They all share a laugh; Yusaku and Kyoko told them they would move out of Ikkoku when they start a family, but every one highly doubts it. A taxi pulls up and the happy couple steps out with their new baby, Haruka. Everyone welcomes her to her new home as the series ends.

== Original video animations (1988-92) ==
No.	Title	Directed by	Written by	Animation directed by	Original release date
1	"Highlights: Through the Passing Seasons"; Transliteration: "Sōshūhen Utusuri Yuku Kisetsu no Naka de" (Japanese: 総集編 移りゆく季節の中で)	Directed by : Naoyuki Yoshinaga; Storyboarded by : Kazuo Yamazaki, Tamiko Kojima, Iku Suzuki, Kazuyoshi Katayama, Eisuke Kondo, Chisato Shigeki, Koji Sawai & Osamu Sekita	Hideo Takayashiki, Hiroshi Konishikawa, Tokio Tsuchiya, Tomoko Konparu & Yutaka Kaneko	Masaaki Kannan, Atsuko Nakajima, Naohito Takahashi, Tsukasa Dokite, Keiko Hattori & Shunji Suzuki	September 25, 1988
A summary of Yusaku and Kyoko's relationship using footage from the TV series.
2	"Side Story: Ikkoku Island Flirtation Story"; Transliteration: "Bangaihen Ikkokujima Nanpa Shimatsuki" (Japanese: 番外編 一刻島ナンパ始末記)	Kenichi Maejima	Hideo Takayashiki	Yukari Kobayashi	January 31, 1991
While using Mitaka's new boat for a vacation trip, the boat crashes and everyone is shipwrecked on a deserted island. Based on a story from the manga.
3	"Prelude, When the Cherry Blossoms Return in the Spring"; Transliteration: "Pureryūdo Mezon Ikkoku: Meguri Haru no Sakura no yō ni..." (Japanese: プレリュードめぞん一刻 めぐる春の桜のように...)	Directed by : Kazuo Yamazaki, Tomokazu Kougo, Kazuyoshi Katayama, Eisuke Kondo, Naoyuki Yoshinaga, Iku Suzuki & Chisato Shigeki; Storyboarded by : Kazuo Yamazaki, Tamiko Kojima, Kazuyoshi Katayama, Naoyuki Yoshinaga, Iku Suzuki, Shigeyasu Yamauchi, Tomokazu Kougo, Takashi Anno & Tomomi Mochizuki	Tokio Tsuchiya, Junki Takegami, Hiroshi Konishikawa, Hideo Takayashiki, Michiru Shimada & Kazunori Itō	Masaaki Kannan, Keiko Hattori, Atsuko Nakajima, Hiroshi Ogawa, Tsukasa Dokite, Naohito Takahashi & Kiichi Takaoka	June 25, 1992
Flashbacks from the TV series are used to tell more about the late Sōichirō. Narration is used to connect the scenes which highlight the events leading to Kyoko's arrival at Ikkoku-kan.

== Film (1988) ==
Title	Directed by	Written by	Animation directed by	Original release date
Maison Ikkoku Final Chapter Transliteration: "Mezon Ikkoku Kanketsuhen" (Japanese: めぞん一刻 完結篇)	Tomomi Mochizuki	Michiru Shimada & Tomomi Mochizuki	Yuji Moriyama	February 6, 1988
Chronologically takes place during the events of TV episode 96. Includes a character from the manga, who was not featured before in the anime. The Maison Ikkoku tenants throw a party to celebrate the marriage of Yuusaku and Kyouko. However, during the party Yuusaku hears that Kyouko is waiting for a letter. He becomes jealous and begins to doubt Kyouko, worrying that she still loves someone else. When the morning arrives, the answer to his worries is revealed. Meanwhile, Yagami comes to Maison Ikkoku to celebrate the 20th birthday with them, not knowing of Godai's and Kyoko's wedding, stating that she is now an adult, which she is, not knowing how to tell her, they panic, but she finds out in the end, and is heart broken. Kyoko consoles her, and the two finally reach an understanding.

== Live action ==
Toei Company released a live action movie after the first season on 10 October 1986. There were also 2 live-action TV specials aired in 2007 and 2008.
