= Hisaichi =

- Gender: Male

Origin
- Origin: Japanese
- Meaning: Different meanings depending on the kanji used

Hisaichi (written: 寿一 or 壽一) is a masculine Japanese given name. Notable people with the name include:

- Hisaichi Ishii (石井 壽一; born 1951), Japanese manga artist
- Hisaichi Terauchi (寺内 寿一; 1879–1946), Imperial Japanese army marshal and commander of the Southern Expeditionary Army Group
