= Baito-kun =

Japanese manga series

- Volume 4 of the Baito-kun manga.

バイトくん
- Genre: Humor
- Manga
- Written by: Hisaichi Ishii
- Published by: Futabasha
- Magazine: Play Guide Journal
- Original run: 1972 – 2009
- Volumes: 10

Baito-kun (バイトくん; "Part-timer-kun") is a yonkoma manga by Hisaichi Ishii serialized in the Kansai area information magazine Play Guide Journal (プレイガイドジャーナル, Purei Gaido Jānaru) beginning in 1972. This was Ishii's debut professional work. In addition to being a long-running series in the magazine, many of the characters from Ishii's later series first made their appearances in this series.

== Summary ==
The story takes place at the fictional Higashi Yodogawa University, though it is modeled on Ishii's alma mater Kansai University. The main characters are poor students living at a boarding house (Nakano-sō), and follows their experiences at and as they travel to and from home, work, and school, covering everyday experiences.

== Characters ==
=== Main ===
Haruhiko Kikuchi (菊池久彦, Kikuchi Haruhiko)
Kikuchi is one of the Three Idiots, and generally the main character. He has a long torso, is a little chubby, has small eyes, and blonde hair.
Kubo (久保)
One of the Three Idiots. He is the skinny guy with glasses. He became friends with Kikuchi while on a summer trip during high school. He doesn't participate in the activities of the Yasu Gesyuku kyōtō Kaigi (An-Kyōtō).
Suzuki (鈴木)
One of the Three Idiots and leader of the Yasu Gesyuku kyōtō Kaigi, a student movement.

=== Other residents of Nakano-shō ===
Yamada (山田)
One of the residents. He's pretty rich, but very stingy. His personality and face changes slightly depending on the story/episode.
Manager (管理人, Kanrinin)
The manager of the boarding house. She is a middle-aged woman. Her face changes slightly in each story/episode.

=== Other university people ===
Tomotoshi Tanabe (田辺留年, Tanabe Tomotoshi)
A 38-year-old student at the university. Because he's been in the same year in school for so long, he's acquired the nickname The Mysterious Man of Higashi Yodogawa University (東淀川大学のヌエ, Higashi Yodogawa Daigaku no Nue). He's also known by the more common "senpai" (meaning "upperclassman"). He's somewhat depressed at his inability to graduate.

=== Others ===
Miyake (三宅)
Kikuchi's girlfriend. She appears to be exactly the same character as Miyake in Non-Career Woman, another manga by Ishii.
Majin (魔人)
A mysterious person from an unknown place who appears in the series.
