= My Neighbors the Yamadas =

1999 anime film by Isao Takahata

- Theatrical release poster

Japanese name
- Kanji: ホーホケキョとなりの山田くん
Transcriptions
- Revised Hepburn: Hōhokekyo Tonari no Yamada-kun
- Directed by: Isao Takahata
- Screenplay by: Isao Takahata
- Based on: Nono-chan by Hisaichi Ishii
- Produced by: Toshio Suzuki
- Starring: Yukiji Asaoka; Toru Masuoka; Masako Araki; Kosanji Yanagiya; Chocho Miyako
- Cinematography: Atsushi Okui
- Edited by: Takeshi Seyama
- Music by: Akiko Yano
- Production company: Studio Ghibli
- Distributed by: Shochiku
- Release date: 17 July 1999
- Running time: 104 minutes
- Country: Japan
- Language: Japanese
- Budget: ¥2 billion (US$15.27 million)
- Box office: ¥1.56 billion (US$11.91 million)

My Neighbors the Yamadas (Note: Japanese: ホーホケキョとなりの山田くん, Hepburn: Hōhokekyo Tonari no Yamada-kun) is a 1999 Japanese animated comedy film written and directed by Isao Takahata, animated by Studio Ghibli for Tokuma Shoten, Nippon Television Network, Hakuhodo and Buena Vista Home Entertainment, and distributed by Shochiku. It is based on the yonkoma manga Nono-chan by Hisaichi Ishii. A slice of life comedy-drama, the film stars Yukiji Asaoka, Toru Masuoka, Hayato Isobata, Naomi Uno, Masako Araki, and Kosanji Yanagiya. Unlike the other films of Studio Ghibli, the film is presented in a stylized comic strip aesthetic, a departure from the traditional anime style of the studio's other works.

== Plot ==
The film is a series of vignettes following the daily lives of the Yamada family: Takashi and Matsuko (the father and mother), Shige (Matsuko's mother), Noboru (the son, aged approximately 15), Nonoko (the daughter, aged approximately 10), and Pochi (the family dog).

Each of the vignettes is preceded by a title such as "Father as Role Model", "A Family Torn Apart" or "Patriarchal Supremacy Restored". These vignettes cover such issues as losing a child in a department store, the relationships between father and son, or husband and wife, the wisdom of age, meeting one's first girlfriend and many more. Each is presented with humour, giving a realistic picture of family life which crosses cultural boundaries. The relationships between Matsuko, Takashi and Shige are particularly well observed, with Shige giving advice and proverbs to all the family members, and having strong character. Takashi and Matsuko's relationship is often the focus of the episodes, their rivalries, such as arguing about who has control of the television, their frustrations and their difficulties, but the overriding theme is their love for one another despite their flaws, and their desire to be the best parents possible for their children.

== Voice cast ==
Character	Original	English
Takashi Yamada	Toru Masuoka	Jim Belushi
Matsuko Yamada	Yukiji Asaoka	Molly Shannon
Noboru Yamada	Hayato Isobata	Daryl Sabara
Nonoko Yamada	Naomi Uno	Liliana Mumy
Shige Yamano	Masako Araki	Tress MacNeille
Haiku Reader/Narrator	Kosanji Yanagiya	David Ogden Stiers
Fujihara-Sensei	Akiko Yano	Edie McClurg
Lady #1	Tamao Nakamura	Dixie Carter
Lady #2	Chocho Miyako	Maree Cheatham

=== English additional voices ===
- Jeff Bennett as Biker #1
- Corey Burton as Biker #2 and bus stop announcement
- Erin Chambers as Girl #1
- Melissa Disney as department store clerk and girl with umbrella
- Amber Hood as Girl #2
- Jim Meskimen as Lead Biker
- Jon Miller as Baseball announcer
- Jeremy Shada as Tanaka
- Billy West as Man talking to Takashi

== Production ==
The film is based on the manga Nono-chan by Hisaichi Ishii.

Takahata intended the film to have the art style of watercolor pictures rather than cel pictures. Using the computer graphics department set up at Studio Ghibli for the production of Princess Mononoke (1997), the traditionally animated paper sketches were scanned into a computer and colored with digital painting. Although the film was advertised as the first from the studio to be entirely digital, only the coloring stage was fully computerized.

== Soundtrack ==
The soundtrack was composed by Akiko Yano and it is characterised by very short piano themes, rather than the long orchestral themes composed by Joe Hisaishi, further adding to the film's distinction from the rest of Ghibli's filmography. Classical pieces played by Czech Philharmonic Chamber Orchestra conducted by Mario Klemens. Released by Tokuma on 1 July 1999.

== Release and reception ==
The film was released in Japan on 17 July 1999. It was the only film produced by Ghibli to not be released by Toho or the Toei Company. It is one of only two films from Takahata to be distributed by neither company, the other being Gauche the Cellist.

The film received positive reviews, with praise to its unique visual style, humor and its observational look at modern Japanese suburban family life. On review aggregator site Rotten Tomatoes, My Neighbors the Yamadas has an approval rating of 78% based on 8 reviews and an average rating of 7.1/10. Ryan Lambie of Den of Geek awarded the film four stars and said, "Anyone expecting the soaring beauty of a typical Studio Ghibli production will probably be a little bemused by the mundanity of the Yamadas' existence, but there's a soothing calm to their daily struggles, a haiku-like sense of tranquillity." Empire rated it four stars and described the film as "an episodic piece that swaps narrative through-lines for a string of comedic observations on family dynamics. Witty, playful and gorgeous to look at." Sam Sewell-Peterson of The Film Magazine praised the film's visuals and called it "a soothing balm, a leisurely and pleasant look at domestic mundanity.

Despite the positive reviews, the film did not fare as well at the box office in Japan as other Ghibli films had done.

== Home media ==
The movie was released on VHS and DVD in Japan by Buena Vista Home Entertainment Japan on 17 November 2000. It is the first Studio Ghibli movie to be released on DVD in Japan.

My Neighbors the Yamadas was released on DVD in America on 16 August 2005, alongside another Takahata film, Pom Poko by Walt Disney Studios Home Entertainment. A Blu-ray version was released in Japan in 2010, and in the UK the following year. The US never got a Blu-ray release by Disney, but GKIDS released the film on Blu-ray for the first time in the US, as well as re-issuing the DVD under a new deal with Studio Ghibli on 16 January 2018.

== Accolades ==
My Neighbors the Yamadas received an Excellence Award for animation at the 1999 Japan Media Arts Festival.
