= Ishii Hisaichi's CNN =

Yonkoma manga series

- Cover art from the manga

いしいひさいちのCNN (Ishii Hisaichi no Shīen'en)
- Genre: Humor, Slice of life story
- Manga
- Written by: Hisaichi Ishii
- Published by: Bunshun
- Original run: 1990 – 1995
- Volumes: 1

Ishii Hisaichi's CNN (いしいひさいちのCNN, Ishii Hisaichi no Shīen'en) is a yonkoma manga series by Hisaichi Ishii which ran from 1990 to 1995 in Japan. The "CNN" in the title stands for "Comical News Network". The focus of the series was commentary on various international situations during the period it ran.

== Characters ==
Bill Clinton
The 42nd president of the United States. In the manga, his wife Hillary is seen constantly dominating him.
George H. W. Bush
The 41st president of the United States. In the manga, he is constantly pestering Clinton to bomb Iraq.
Boris Yeltsin
The president of Russia at the time. He is shown frequently drinking vodka. After being hospitalized due to problems caused by drinking, he is told he must stop drinking vodka. The manga blames the weakness of the Russian economy on the impact of Yeltsin's sudden lack of drinking.
Jiang Zemin
Former General Secretary of the Communist Party of China. He spends his time in the manga going from sorrow to joy over the illness of Deng Xiaoping, Paramount leader of the Communist Party of China until 1997 when he died. He's also always repeating the last request of Chairman Mao Zedong as given to Premier Hua Guofeng, as well as saying other strange things.
Saddam Hussein
The president of Iraq at the time. He spends his time in the manga threatening to invade Kuwait unless he's made a permanent member of the United Nations Security Council.
Kim Jong Il
The General Secretary of the Communist Party of Korea and film fanatic in the manga. He has a bronze statue of himself made which is the same height as the one of his father, Kim Il Sung, though he has the pedestal on which his statue sits made twice as tall.

== Collections ==
- ISBN 4163617000, 1995-08-01, ¥600, Bunshun
