= Nono-chan =

Japanese media franchise

- Cover of volume 5 of the manga published by Futabasha.

ののちゃん
- Genre: Humor, Slice of life story
- Manga

Tonari no Yamada-kun
- Written by: Hisaichi Ishii
- Published by: Asahi Shimbun; Tokyo Sogensha; Tokuma Shoten
- Magazine: Asahi Shimbun
- Original run: October 1, 1991 – March 31, 1997
- Volumes: 6 (Asahi); 11 (Sogensha); 3 (Tokuma)
- Manga
- Written by: Hisaichi Ishii
- Published by: Futabasha (Channel Zero); Tokyo Sogensha; Tokuma Shoten
- Magazine: Asahi Shimbun
- Original run: April 1, 1997 – present
- Volumes: 10 (Futabasha/Channel Zero); 12 (Sogensha); 7 (Tokuma)
- Anime television series
- Directed by: Toshinori Fukuzawa
- Produced by: Yumi Shimizu; Kenji Oota; Hiroyuki Sakurada
- Written by: Takashi Yamada
- Music by: en avant
- Studio: Toei Animation
- Original network: TV Asahi
- Original run: July 7, 2001 – September 28, 2002
- Episodes: 61
- Anime film
- My Neighbors the Yamadas (1999)

Nono-chan (ののちゃん) is a yonkoma manga series begun in 1991 by Hisaichi Ishii originally serialized as My Neighbors the Yamadas (となりのやまだ君, Tonari no Yamada-kun) in the Asahi Shimbun in Japan. When the series first began, it was generally focused on all of the members of the Yamada family. As the series progressed, the daughter (Nonoko, or "Nono-chan") became the most popular character among readers and more of the strips focused on her and her point of view. In 1997, the series title was changed to reflect this change of focus.

In July 1999, Studio Ghibli released My Neighbors the Yamadas, a film based on this series. From 2001 to 2002, a 61 episode anime television series based on the manga was shown on the TV Asahi network in Japan.

== Characters ==
=== Yamada family ===
Nonoko Yamada (山田のの子, Yamada Nonoko)
Nonoko is the main character and a very easy-going 3rd grade elementary school student. She is constantly battling to keep the lowest spot in the class (for grades).
Matsuko Yamada (山田まつ子, Yamada Matsuko)
Nonoko's mother, a housewife. She is always worrying about what to cook for dinner (usually something that goes with rice, and it usually turns out to be some sort of curry). She is a somewhat sloppy housekeeper as well as being forgetful.
Takashi Yamada (山田たかし, Yamada Takashi)
Nonoko's father, an ordinary salaryman. Unlike his wife and daughter, Takashi is a very diligent worker. His car is a piece of junk, and his hobbies include pachinko and golf.
Noboru Yamada (山田のぼる, Yamada Noboru)
Nonoko's older brother, a junior high school student. He's very good at sociology, but has poor study skills and doesn't do as well in other subjects.
Shige Yamano (山野しげ, Yamano Shige)
Nonoko's grandmother and Matsuko's mother. She is 70 years old. Shige is very energetic, but a very stubborn and hard boiled grandmother.
Pochi (ポチ)
The Yamada family's pet dog. He generally has a sullen, grumpy mood.

== History ==
Due to health reasons, the series was on hiatus from November 22, 2009, to February 28, 2010.

On August 13, 2011, the series reached its 5,000th installment. Although there was no discussion related to this milestone in the manga's content, it was announced in the "Subatomic Particles" column of the evening edition on the same day. By January 2020, the series had reached its 8,000th installment. Including the series "Tonari no Yamada-kun", it has been ongoing for nearly 30 years, making it the longest-running manga serialization in the history of Asahi Shimbun. Although primarily composed of four-panel comics, in recent years, it has become more flexible, incorporating vertical panels in three panels, wide panels, and vertically split panels to create five-panel strips.

On April 2, 2020, including its predecessor "Tonari no Yamada-kun", the series achieved a total of 10,000 installments.

For Hisaichi Ishii, this was his first serialized work in a nationwide newspaper (assuming daily publication). (Note: Apart from works not published in daily newspapers, he serialized "Economic Outrage" in the "Weekend Economy" section of Asahi Shimbun (every Saturday) starting January 25, 1986. Additionally, in the 1980s, he published work intermittently in the regional newspaper Yukan Fuji, and at one point, he serialized in daily editions excluding Sundays (which were not published on Sundays).) Because he continued to work on the series without significantly changing his style from his magazine work, it has some rare features among four-panel comic strips in national newspapers (especially in the early days of "Tonari no Yamada-kun"). One notable feature is that several main characters speak Kansai dialect, particularly in the early days. Later, some characters spoke Okayama dialect.

While some episodes have obscure punchlines, this adds to their unique charm. The series also features overt satire aimed at celebrities and characters speaking in near-cryptic slang (examples include):

- A direct parody of Toshiki Kaifu, then Prime Minister, by calling him "Mr. Miyazawa", who supposedly doesn't speak English, shortly after his resignation.
- When Haruki Kadokawa was arrested for drug violations, a character (Shige) says, "Even without drugs, I was getting high",.
- A character modeled after Tsuneo Watanabe appears as "One-Man Man." At the time of this episode's publication, Yomiuri Shimbun criticized the manga for allegedly defaming a specific individual (Watanabe). (Note: Yomiuri criticizes Watanabe for manga in Sankei Sports, January 29, 2001 (via Internet Archive). The circumstances are unclear, but it took over a year after the episode's release for the "One-Man Man" book to be published. No further significant protests occurred, and "One-Man Man" continued to appear into the 2010s. Recently, he often appears as a selfish Santa Claus figure.)

Despite being a slice-of-life manga, it incorporates elements of science fiction and fantasy, with some yokai (supernatural creatures) living among the Yamada family, occasionally appearing as if they are ordinary.

Following the Great Hanshin Earthquake, the manga depicted the Yamada family's concern for the safety of earthquake victims. Over the subsequent five days, related stories were published consecutively, a rare case of sustained coverage of a single news event. After becoming "Nono-chan", the series has less frequently featured current events, including satire of celebrities. During the 2011 Tohoku earthquake, the manga avoided directly referencing the disaster, instead adding a fictional maritime accident as a background setting to explore the feelings of bereaved families.

Initially, furigana (reading aids) were not used, but now they are written in katakana.

Since resuming serialization in 2010, some illustrations are presented as four-panel comics in school newspaper formats within "Nonoko", depicting satirical portrayals of real people. These are similar or identical to other works by Ishii, such as "Ninja Mugencho," "Alas! The Crown Does Not Shine on You," "B-Gata Heiji Torimonocho," "War Without Justice," and "Part-Time Boy", among others. This experiment lasted about once or twice a month for roughly a year. Critic Tomohiko Murakami described it as an "Nono-chan Donut Book (Futabasha's Ishii Hisaichi personal collection)", but by the time of his observation, the project had been paused for over six months (and subsequently over three years). No major protests occurred afterward, and "Nonoko" continued to appear into the 2010s.

In the May 11, 2011, issue (episode 4908), the manga included a story reminiscent of the sinking of the Shiun-maru, which resulted in casualties ten years earlier. The character introductions in the eighth volume mention some families of characters having died in a maritime accident. (Note: May 11 marks the day of the 168 victims and the incident of the Shiun-maru, one of Japan's post-war five major train accidents.) These sharply pointed experiments, including the girl baseball player Shimada, the school newspaper "Gakukoku", Womano-man, Roca, and the alien girl Tsumita Tsuki-ko, often experience long hiatuses or reappear after being forgotten, leading to periods with repeated Yamada family stories. The internal conflicts with the editorial department are not detailed, but Ishii has stated that he generally complies with rejection or revision requests. The final episode featuring Roca (episode 5217) was announced on the official website as having been poorly received by core Asahi Shimbun readers, indicating some tension behind the scenes.

=== Differences between "Tonari no Yamada-kun" and "Nonoko-chan" ===
When renamed, most of the setting, characters, and worldview remained the same, but some roles and details were changed:

- The character of the principal of Nonoko Elementary (modeled after Katsuya Nomura) appears as the director of the city hospital in "Nonoko-chan."
- Kôsuke Tabuchi, the unsuccessful mystery novelist and nephew of Matsu-ko in "Tonari no Yamada-kun", appears as Mr. Tabuchi, a PE teacher at Dai-san Elementary School, in "Nonoko-chan."
- A character who was the president of a small factory in "Tonari no Yamada-kun" became a principal at an elementary school.
- Takashi's older brother (Yoshio, Ishii's uncle) was depicted as running a farm in his hometown in "Nonoko-chan." Later, after the death of their mother, he moved in with the Yamada family and runs a bakery near their home, reflecting a more casual setting akin to the early days of "Yamada-kun."
- The number of students in Noboru's class decreased from 500 (in "Yamada-kun") to 200, then to 180 ("Nonoko-chan").
- In "Yamada-kun," Kikuchi-kun was depicted as having two older sisters (mentioned later), but in "Nonoko-chan", he is an only child.

Other setting changes may occur during serialization.

== Books ==
- "Tonari no Yamada-kun" (Comics) – Published by Asahi Shimbun. A total of 6 volumes. This was the first complete collection of "Yamada-kun." Although it was interrupted, the editions from Tokyo Sogen-sha and Tokuma Shoten include full reprints of this volume.
- "Tonari no Yamada-kun" (Bunko) – Published by Tokyo Sogensha. 11 volumes. Compiles all works published in Asahi Shimbun into semiannual volumes, with the publication date noted under each story. The end of each volume also includes reprints of past works such as "Wai wa Asashio ya" (a four-panel manga) by the same author.
- "The Complete Yamada-kun" – Published by Tokuma Shoten. 3 volumes. Includes related works like "Tonari no Kikuchi-kun." Released to coincide with the film adaptation. Together with "Nonoko-chan Complete Works", it fully reprints the series serialized in Asahi Shimbun.
- "Nonoko-chan" (Comics) – Published by Futabasha (originally from Channel Zero). 10 volumes. Collects works published in the newspaper not included in the "Yamada-kun" series or created before serialization. Some volumes feature characters on the covers.
- "Nonoko-chan" (Bunko) – Published by Tokyo Sogensha. 12 volumes. Compiles all works published in Asahi Shimbun. The volumes are published biannually, with volumes 8 and onward including about 700 pages each, making it a massive collection unmatched in Japanese four-panel manga collections. Ishii historically did not fully compile his serialized works into single volumes or prefer to unify characters/worlds in collections.
- "Tonari no Nonoko-chan" – Co-authored with Hiroshi Ogawa (character designer for the anime). Includes works from the first book and materials from the film press conference, focusing on the series' worldview. Also features setting materials and film comics from the "Nonoko-chan" anime.
- "The World of Nonoko" – Published by Tokyo Sogensha. A revised and expanded paperback version of "Tonari no Nonoko-chan", excluding unrelated media.
- "Fun!" – Published by Tokuma Shoten. Contains short manga stories (about 2 pages each) "Fun!" featuring Pochi from Studio Ghibli's "Natsufū," and illustrated essays "Daily Pochi" (by Masumi Mine).
- "Hayasichi Bunko: The People of the Yamada Family" – Published by Futabasha. 3 volumes. Focuses on family-themed works, including "Ojama Manga Yamada-kun." Volume 2 shows the transition from "Yamada-kun" to "Nonoko-chan." Volume 3 contains slightly different versions of "The Yamada Family" stories published elsewhere.
- "Donuts Books" – Published by Channel Zero. 39 volumes. Includes unpublished newspaper works of "Nonoko-chan" and early works before "Yamada-kun" serialization. Some covers feature characters from "Nonoko-chan" or "Yamada-kun."
- "Tama no Nono Nono-chan" – Published by Seibun-sha. Collects "Tama no Nono Nono-chan," serialized in "Kōhō Tama" and other outlets. Unlike "Nonoko-chan", all characters speak Okayama dialect.

== TV Anime "Nono-chan" ==
TV Asahi aired this program from July 7, 2001, to September 28, 2002. It was a joint production with Toei Animation. The series consists of 61 episodes. Up to episode 35, each episode was broadcast in two parts, A and B; from episode 36 onward, a third part, C, was added, making three broadcasts per episode. (Note: In some cases, a split format with inserted sub-episodes occurs. When this happens, the subtitles are suffixed with "Part 1" and "Part 2" (e.g., episode 6). For episode 58, the subtitle is preceded by "Continued:".) After this program ended, in the same year, the successor animated series was "Tsuribaka Nisshi", which is broadcast nationwide as an anime. It has not been released on DVD. The series was also broadcast on the CS channel Animax.

=== Voice Cast ===
- Nonoko Yamada – Ikue Otani
- Matsuko Yamada – Keiko Yamamoto
- Shige Yamanou – Reiko Suzuki
- Noboru Yamada – Yasuhiro Takato
- Takashi Yamada, Principal, Mr. Hirooka – Hideyuki Tanaka
- Pochi, Yasuoka-sensei, Kubo-kun – Wataru Takagi
- Teacher Hitomi Fujiwara – Kanakana Yamasaki
- Teacher Tabuchi – Masaya Takatsuka
- Kikuchi-kun, Teacher Haruko Kondo – Junko Noda
- Suzuki-kun – Takuya Suzuki
- Mimi-chan – Yuka Komatsu
- Nana-chan – Tomoko Kaneda
- Kawada – Michitaka Kobayashi
- Neighborhood Association President – Naoki Tsuruta

=== Staff (TV Anime) ===
- Original Work – Hisashi Ishii (published in Asahi Shimbun morning edition)
- Production Supervisors – Munehisa Higuchi, Yukio Noda
- Music – en avant
- Series Composition – Takashi Yamada
- Character Design – Hiroshi Ogawa
- Art Design – Yukiko Iijima
- Color Design – Takako Mimuro
- Series Directors – Nobutaka Nishizawa, Kiyoshi Sasaki
- Animation and Digital Coloring – Toei Animation Philippines
- Digital Photography – Toei Lab Tec
- Editing – Shigeru Nishiyama
- Sound Recording – Sadashi Kuramoto
- Sound Assistant – Satoru Fujimura
- Sound Effects – Swara Pro / Yasuyuki Konno
- Music Selection – Kousuke Nishikawa
- Art Progress – Reiko Kitayama
- Finish Progress – Yosuke Asama
- Recording – Minori Kajimoto
- Public Relations – Aruka Kyoku (TV Asahi)
- Assistant Producer – Naomi Nishiguchi
- Music Cooperation – TV Asahi Music, Toei Animation Music Publishing
- Recording Studio – TAVAC
- Online Editing – TOVIC
- Cooperation – Daiko (from episode 6 onward)
- Producers: Kenji Ota → Taro Iwamoto, Yumi Shimizu (TV Asahi), Hiroyuki Sakurada (Toei Animation)
- Production Cooperation – Toei, Dentsu
- Production – TV Asahi, Toei Animation
- (C) Hisashi Ishii / Yamada Planning, TV Asahi, Dentsu, Toei Animation

=== Theme Songs ===
Opening Theme
"Urushi no Uta" (Columbia Music)
Lyrics/Composition/Arrangement – en avant / Song – Nonoko-chan (Ikue Otani)
Ending Theme
"Nonoko-chan Family's Song" (Nippon Columbia)
Lyrics – Yumi Yoshimoto / Composition – HULK / Arrangement – en avant / Song – Nonoko-chan Family (Ikue Otani, Keiko Yamamoto, Reiko Suzuki, Yasuhiro Takato, Hideyuki Tanaka)

=== Episode list ===
Episode	Subtitle	Screenplay	(Storyboard) Direction	Animation Supervisor	Art	Air Date
Episode 1	"Nonoko and Fun Friends"	Takashi Yamada	Nobutaka Nishizawa	Takashi Sawa	Yukiko Iijima	July 7, 2001
Episode 1	"Nonsense! The Yamada Family"	Takashi Yamada	Nobutaka Nishizawa	Takashi Sawa	Yukiko Iijima	
Episode 2	"Fun School, Good School"	Nobuaki Kishi	Tetsuya Yamada	Tetsuya Saeki	Tadao Kubota	July 14, 2001
Episode 2	"Pochi the Lost Dog Goes"	Nobuaki Kishi	Tetsuya Yamada	Tetsuya Saeki	Tadao Kubota	
Episode 3	"Summer Vacation Has Come!"	Takashi Yamada	Kenji Sasaki	Ryuhiro Nagaki	Yukiko Iijima	July 21, 2001
Episode 3	"Super Easy! Science Project"	Takashi Yamada	Kenji Sasaki	Naotoshi Shida	Yukiko Iijima	
Episode 4	"The Pool is a Big Splash"	Yoshimi Narita	Hiroki Shibata	Mitsuo Shindo	Tadao Kubota	August 4, 2001
Episode 4	"Mom's Elegant Day"	Yoshimi Narita	Hiroki Shibata	Mitsuo Shindo	Tadao Kubota	Yukiko Iijima
Episode 5	"Let's Build a Secret Base"	Yumi Kageyama	Yoshihiro Ueda	Masami Abe	Yukiko Iijima	August 11, 2001
Episode 5	"Dad's Unfortunate Day"	Yumi Kageyama	Yoshihiro Ueda	Masami Abe	Yukiko Iijima	
Episode 6	"Frightening Drive"	Shunichi Yukimuro	Satoru Iri	Shusaku Ishikawa	Kenji Tajiri	August 18, 2001
Episode 7	"Teacher Fujiwara Is a Mystery"	Nobuaki Kishi	Tetsuya Yamada	Kanba Kyan	Yukiko Iijima	August 25, 2001
Episode 7	"Big Brother's First Date"	Nobuaki Kishi	Tetsuya Yamada	"Kanmi Miyako"	Yukiko Iijima	
Episode 8	"Powerful Grandma"	Yoshimi Narita	Kenji Sasaki	Tetsuya Saeki	Miyake Masakazu	September 8, 2001
Episode 8	"Summer Vacation Ends"	Yoshimi Narita	Kenji Sasaki	Tetsuya Saeki	Yukiko Iijima	
Episode 9	"Gloomy New Semester"	Takashi Yamada	Takao Yoshizawa	Takashi Sawa	Yukiko Iijima	September 15, 2001
Episode 9	"Pochi Is Good at Social Skills"	Takashi Yamada	Takao Yoshizawa	Takashi Sawa		
Episode 10	"Principal's Effort"	Yumi Kageyama	Yoshihiro Ueda	Naotoshi Shida	Miyake Masakazu	September 22, 2001
Episode 10	"Mom's Diet"	Yumi Kageyama	Yoshihiro Ueda	Ryuhiro Nagaki	Miyake Masakazu	
Episode 11	"Teacher Fujiwara's Matchmaking"	Shunichi Yukimuro	Kei Kasai	Mitsuo Shindo	Yukiko Iijima	September 29, 2001
Episode 11	"Exciting Shopping Rally"	Shunichi Yukimuro	Kei Kasai	Mitsuo Shindo		
Episode 12	"Enjoying Little League Baseball"	Nobuaki Kishi	Tetsuya Yamada	Abe Masaki	Miyake Masakazu	October 6, 2001
Episode 12	"Exciting Sports Day Tomorrow"	Nobuaki Kishi	Tetsuya Yamada	Abe Masaki		
Episode 13	"Big Ruckus! Sports Day"	Yoshimi Narita	Sasaki Kenji	Hoshikawa Nobuyoshi; Ishikawa Shusuke	Yukiko Iijima	October 13, 2001
Episode 14	"Aim to Be a Capable Housewife"	Nobuaki Kishi	Shibata Hiroki	Kyan Kyan	Miyake Masakazu	October 20, 2001
Episode 14	"Surprise Home Visit"	"Miyako Miyako"				
Episode 15	"Is Teacher a Future Great Writer?"	Yumi Kageyama	Ueda Yoshihiro	Saeki Tetsuya	Yukiko Iijima	October 27, 2001
Episode 15	"Pochi's Parenting Diary"					
Episode 16	"Autumn Full of Yamada Family"	Yoshimi Narita	Koyama Ken	Takashi Sawa	Miyake Masakazu	November 3, 2001
Episode 16	"Attack! The Three Girls"					
Episode 17	"Easy? Fake Field Trip"	Shunichi Yukimuro	Yoshizawa Takao	Shida Naotoshi; Ryuhiro Nagaki	Yukiko Iijima	November 10, 2001
Episode 18	"Exciting Cultural Festival Love"	Nobuaki Kishi	Sasaki Kenji	Abe Masaki	Miyake Masakazu	November 17, 2001
Episode 18	"Super Powerful! Satchan Typhoon"					
Episode 19	"Energetic Silver Club"	Yoshimi Narita	Tetsuya Yamada	Shindo Mitsuo	Yukiko Iijima	November 24, 2001
Episode 19	"Fell in Love at First Sight with Teacher Fujiwara"					
Episode 20	"Chaotic Observation Day"	Yumi Kageyama	Satoru Iri	Nobuyoshi Hoshikawa	Miyake Masakazu	December 1, 2001
Episode 20	"Trying Again to Be a Capable Housewife"	"Miyako Miyako"				
Episode 21	"Love for Sukiyaki"	Reiko Yoshida	Yoshihiro Ueda	Shusuke Ishikawa	Yukiko Iijima	December 8, 2001
Episode 21	"Detective Miyabe-kun"	Kyan Kyan				
Episode 22	"Win the Lottery!"	Yoshimi Narita	Takao Yoshizawa	Naotoshi Shida	Miyake Masakazu	December 15, 2001
Episode 22	"Fun! End-of-Year Party"					
Episode 23	"Everyone Loves Christmas!"	Yumi Kageyama	Koyama Ken	Abe Masaki	Miyake Masakazu	December 22, 2001
Episode 23	"Fun Year-End Mochi Pounding"					
Episode 24	"Yamada Family Full of Energy Again!!"	Takashi Yamada	Sasaki Kenji	Takashi Sawa	Yukiko Iijima	January 12, 2002
Episode 25	"Huge Fuss Over the Flu"	Kishi Nobuaki	Orimoto Makiko	Saeki Tetsuya	Miyake Masakazu	January 19, 2002
Episode 26	"Snow Sled Race"	Yoshiko Yoshida	Tetsuya Yamada	Mitsuo Shindo	Miyake Masakazu	January 26, 2002
Episode 26	"Pochi Gets in a Big Fight No One Eats!"				Miyake Masakazu	
Episode 27	"How to Win Baseball!"	Kishi Nobuaki	Satoru Iri	Ryuhiro Nagaki; Miyako Miyako	Yukiko Iijima	February 2, 2002
Episode 28	"Confrontation! Teacher vs. Fujiwara"	Yoshimi Narita	Satoru Iri	Kyan Kyan	Miyake Masakazu	February 9, 2002
Episode 28	"Ski Class: Swoosh Swoosh"	Shusuke Ishikawa				
Episode 29	"Motivated! Neighborhood Marathon"	Yoshio Urasawa	Takao Yoshizawa	Saeki Tetsuya	Yukiko Iijima	February 16, 2002
Episode 30	"The Play Is Still My Main Role"	Sasaki Kenji	Abe Masaki	Miyake Masakazu	February 23, 2002	
Episode 31	"First Time Learning"	Yoshiko Yoshida	Koyama Ken	Shida Naotoshi	Yukiko Iijima	March 2, 2002
Episode 31	"Dreamy Hot Spring Trip"					
Episode 32	"Fear of Report Cards"	Yoshio Urasawa	Orimoto Makiko	Takashi Sawa	Miyake Masakazu	March 9, 2002
"Persistent Diet"						
Episode 33	"Dad's Blues"	Yumi Kageyama	Tetsuya Yamada	Shindo Mitsuo	Yukiko Iijima	March 16, 2002
"Traveling to Visit Grandma"						
Episode 34	"Mean Stamp Rally"	Yoshio Urasawa	Koyama Ken	Miyako Miyako; Kyan Kyan	Miyake Masakazu	March 23, 2002
Episode 35	"Cherry Blossom Viewing Operation"	Yoshio Urasawa	Ueda Yoshihiro	Saeki Tetsuya	Yukiko Iijima	March 30, 2002
Episode 36	"Kikuchi-kun in Big Trouble!"	Sasaki Kenji	Abe Masaki	Ishikawa Shusuke	Miyake Masakazu	April 6, 2002
Episode 36	"Mom's Day of Patience"					
Episode 36	"The Reversal of the Underground People"					
Episode 37	"Elections Are Fun"	Yoshida Yoshiko	Yoshizawa Takao	Takashi Sawa	Yukiko Iijima	April 13, 2002
Episode 37	"Meeting Is Difficult"					
Episode 37	"Go for It, Nana-chan!"					
Episode 38	"The Vice Principal Comes!"	Yoshimi Narita	Orimoto Makiko	Ishikawa Shusuke	Nami Shibata	April 20, 2002
Episode 38	"Showdown! Vice Principal vs. Fujiwara"	Hoshikawa Nobuyoshi				
Episode 38	"Mom's Cavity"	Shindo Mitsuo				
Episode 39	"Kubo-kun's Weak Point"	Yoshio Urasawa	Tetsuya Yamada	Shida Naotoshi, Kyan Kyan	Yukiko Iijima	April 27, 2002
Episode 39	"Follow the Vice Principal!"					
Episode 39	"Big Brother, Hang in There!"					
Episode 40	"Legendary Carp Streamers"	Mitsuhide Mitsui	Koyama Ken	Ryuhiro Nagaki	Miyake Masakazu	May 4, 2002
Episode 40	"Cursed Teacher Fujiwara"	Ishikawa Shusuke				
Episode 40	"Happy Family Swap"	Miyako Miyako				
Episode 41	"Grandma, Be Strong!"	Nobuhiro Fujimoto	Ueda Yoshihiro	Saeki Tetsuya	Yukiko Iijima	May 11, 2002
Episode 41	"Hunger War"					
Episode 41	"The Continued Vice Principal vs. Fujiwara"					
Episode 42	"Challenging Part-Time Job"	Yoshiko Yoshida	Satoru Iri	Hoshikawa Nobuyoshi	Miyake Masakazu	May 18, 2002
Episode 42	"Nana-chan Finally Gets Angry"					
Episode 42	"Nonoko's Love Affair Revealed"					
Episode 43	"Disappeared Nonoko"	Kohko Nakahiro	Sasaki Kenji	Takashi Sawa, Shida Naotoshi	Yukiko Iijima	May 25, 2002
Episode 43	"Bento Lunch on Hold"					
Episode 43	"Nonoko's Fun Gardening"					
Episode 44	"Cleaning Duty Is Scary"	Kishi Nobuaki	Yoshizawa Takao	Takashi Sawa	Miyake Masakazu	June 1, 2002
Episode 44	"Big Brother's Exam Study"	Hoshikawa Nobuyoshi				
Episode 44	"Mysteries at the Coast"	Kyan Kyan				
Episode 45	"Nonoko's Revenge Strategy"	Yoshio Urasawa	Tetsuya Yamada	Shindo Mitsuo, Ishikawa Shusuke	Yukiko Iijima	June 8, 2002
Episode 45	"City Prankster"					
Episode 45	"Silver Power Full Blast"					
Episode 46	"Teacher Fujiwara's Remodel Plan"	Yoshio Urasawa	Orimoto Makiko	Shindo Mitsuo	Miyake Masakazu	June 15, 2002
Episode 46	"Animal Care Duty Is Tough"	Miyayako Kaneko				
Episode 46	"Power Outage!"	Ryuhiro Nagaki				
Episode 47	"Secret Base Wars"	Mitsuhide Mitsui	Ueda Yoshihiro	Saeki Tetsuya	Yukiko Iijima	June 22, 2002
Episode 47	"Nonoko Appears on TV!?"					
Episode 47	"Cleaning Up Is a Pain"					
Episode 48	"Pencil Case Missing!"	Yoshio Urasawa	Koyama Ken	Abe Masaki	Ishikawa Shusuke	June 29, 2002
Episode 48	"Leader's Self-Awareness"					
Episode 48	"Let's Go Out to Eat!"					
Episode 49	"Win a Lottery!"	Kishi Nobuaki	Sasaki Kenji	Takashi Sawa	Yukiko Iijima	July 6, 2002
Episode 49	"Sugoroku Strategy"					
Episode 49	"International Student Comes"					
Episode 50	"Yamada Family Stays at Home"	Yoshio Urasawa	Naoto Yamada	Ishikawa Shusuke	Yukiko Iijima	July 13, 2002
Episode 50	"Amy Typhoon"	Hoshikawa Nobuyoshi				
Episode 50	"Fun Flea Market"	Kyan Kyan				
Episode 51	"Pika Pika Wax Strategy"	Yoshio Urasawa	Yoshizawa Takao	Miyako Miyako; Shida Naotoshi	Miyake Masakazu	July 20, 2002
Episode 51	"Enter the Nurse's Office"					
Episode 51	"Dad's Sunday Carpentry"					
Episode 52	"Exciting Pool"	Yoshio Urasawa	Ueda Yoshihiro	Saeki Tetsuya	Yukiko Iijima	July 27, 2002
Episode 52	"Covert Mission of the Neighborhood Chair"					
Episode 52	"The Conspiracy of the Neighborhood Chair"					
Episode 53	"Worrying Report Card"	Yoshio Urasawa	Orimoto Makiko	Takashi Sawa	Yukiko Iijima	August 3, 2002
Episode 53	"Follow the Vice Principal"					
Episode 53	"Big Brother, Keep Going"					
Episode 54	"Sea and Cat"	Yoshio Urasawa	Ueda Yoshihiro	Saeki Tetsuya	Yukiko Iijima	August 10, 2002
Episode 54	"The Neighborhood President's Plot"					
Episode 54	"Survival Without Nonoko"					
Episode 55	"Find Catherine-chan"	Yoshio Urasawa	Sasaki Kenji	Takashi Sawa	Yukiko Iijima	August 17, 2002
Episode 55	"Welcome to the Museum"					
Episode 55	"Dad's Day Off"					
Episode 56	"Scorching Yamada Family"	Nobuhiro Fujimoto	Koyama Ken	Shida Naotoshi; Nagayoshi Nagaki	Miyake Masakazu	August 24, 2002
Episode 56	"Cooling Off Kimo Dameshi Tournament"					
Episode 56	"Last Day of Summer Vacation"					
Episode 57	"Happy Cosmos Field"	Yoshio Urasawa	Tetsuya Yamada	Ishikawa Shusuke; Shindo Mitsuo	Yukiko Iijima	August 31, 2002
Episode 57	"Typhoon Approaching"					
Episode 57	"First Love, The Taste of Ohagi"					
Episode 58	"Baby Is Coming?!"	Yoshio Urasawa	Haru Koisaka	Miyako Miyako	Miyake Masakazu	September 7, 2002
Episode 58	"Transfer Student"	Kyan Kyan; Shida Naotoshi				
Episode 59	"Fun Cooking"	Yoshiko Yoshida	Takao Yoshizawa	Saeki Tetsuya	Yukiko Iijima	September 14, 2002
Episode 59	"Let's Go to the Wedding"					
Episode 59	"Aim for Idol Debut"					
Episode 60	"Happy Fried Bread"	Yoshio Urasawa	Sasaki Kenji	Abe Masaki	Miyake Masakazu	September 21, 2002
Episode 60	"Today, Visiting the Grave"					
Episode 60	"Popular Dad?!"					
Episode 61	"Is Kikuchi-kun a Celebrity!?"	Kishi Nobuaki	Ueda Yoshihiro	Takashi Sawa; Nagayoshi Nagaki	Yukiko Iijima	September 28, 2002
Episode 61	"Nonoko's Diet"					
Episode 61	"Wonderful Yamada Family!"					

== Web anime "Nonoko-chan Theater" ==
An online-exclusive anime that directly adapts the original four-panel manga into animation, streamed via Asahi.com from September 2001 to February 2005. Production by Opera House, with casting cooperation from Laverite Pro.

=== Voice cast ===
- Nonoko Yamada, Hitomi Fujiwara – Reina Yasumura
- Matsuko Yamada, Miyabe-kun – Yuri Tetsuya
- Shige Yamada, Suzuki-kun – Jun Mizuki
- Noboru Yamada, Kubo-kun – Jun Aso
- Takashi Yamada, Kikuchi-kun – Hiroaki Morisue

== Appointed as Tamano City mascot character ==
With Ishii's cooperation,Tamano City, Okayama Prefecture, where Hisaichi Ishii is from, appointed Nono-chan as the city's image character in 2010, the 70th anniversary of the city's incorporation. A costume was made for Nono-chan, and she appears at local character events in the same way as other municipal mascot characters (Yuru-chara). In addition, a special edition, "Tamano Nono Nono-chan," is currently being serialized in the "Tamano Public Relations" magazine.

In July 2010, the government began issuing license plates featuring Nono-chan for motorized bicycles.

== See also ==
- Crayon Shin-chan
- Chibi Maruko-chan
- Sazae-san
