= Hisaichi Ishii =

Japanese manga artist

Hisaichi Ishii (いしい ひさいち or 石井 壽一, Ishii Hisaichi; born September 2, 1951, in Tamano, Okayama Prefecture, Japan) is a Japanese manga artist. He is best known outside Japan for his manga series Nono-chan, which was adapted into the Studio Ghibli anime film My Neighbors the Yamadas. Topics covered by Ishii's manga include baseball (in his debut work), politics, economics, current events and topics, philosophy, and so on. He is known for his extreme caricatures of well-known celebrities and well known people, including Kōichi Tabuchi (a pro baseball catcher in Japan), Kim Jong Il, and Tsuneo Watanabe (executive director of the Yomiuri Shimbun Holdings group, owner of the Yomiuri Shimbun).

Ishii graduated with a degree in sociology at Kansai University.

== Works ==
Listed alphabetically.

- B-gata Heiji Torimonochō (B型平次捕物帳)
- Baito-kun (debut professional work)
- Bungō Junjū (文豪春秋)
- Chiteijin (地底人)
- Comical Mystery Tour (コミカル・ミステリー・ツアー, Komikaru Misuterī Tsuā)
- Daimondai (大問題)
- Dotabata Party (ドタバタぱぁティー, Dotabata Pātī)
- Doughnuts Books
- Ganbare!! Tabuchi-kun!! (がんばれ!!タブチくん!!, Ganbare!! Tabuchi-kun!!)
- Ganzen no Teki (眼前の敵)
- Gendai Shisō no Sōnanja-tachi (現代思想の遭難者たち)
- Gokiburi Shinbun (ゴキブリ新聞)
- Hmph! (フン!, Fun!)
- Hon no Issatsu (ほんの一冊)
- Hon no Hondana (ほんの本棚)
- Ishii Hisaichi's CNN
- Ishii Hisaichi no Keizaigairon (いしいひさいちの経済外論)
- Ishii Hisaichi no Mondaigairon (いしいひさいちの問題外論)
- Ishii Hisaichi no Taiseikai (いしいひさいちの大政界)
- Kagami no Kuni no Sensō (鏡の国の戦争)
- Makamaka Mangaman (まかまか漫マン)
- Ninja Mugeichō (忍者無芸帖)
- Non-Career Woman (ノンキャリウーマン, Nonkyari Ūman)
- Nono-chan (formerly titled My Neighbors the Yamadas)
- Odoru Taisekai (踊る大政界)
- Ojamanga Yamada-kun
- Ōsaka 100en Seikatsu Baito-kun Tsūshin (大阪100円生活バイトくん通信)
- Scrapstic (スクラップスチック, Sukurappusuchikku)
- Shin Ninja Mugeichō (新忍者無芸帖)
- Tonari no Nono-chan (となりのののちゃん)
- Wai wa Asashio ya (ワイはアサシオや)
- Watashi ni wa Mukanai Shokugyō (女（わたし）には向かない職業)
- Watashi wa Neko de Aru (わたしはネコである)
- Watashi wa Neko de Aru Satsujin Jiken (わたしはネコである殺人事件)
