= Ganbare!! Tabuchi-kun!! =

Japanese manga and anime film series

- A flyer promoting Ganbare!! Tabuchi-kun!!

がんばれ!!タブチくん!!
- Genre: Sports (Baseball), comedy, slice of life
- Manga
- Written by: Hisaichi Ishii
- Published by: Futabasha
- Magazine: Weekly Manga Action
- Original run: 1978 – 1979
- Volumes: 3
- Anime film
- Directed by: Tsutomu Shibayama
- Produced by: Yutaka Fujioka; Mataichirō Yamamoto
- Written by: Masaki Tsuji
- Music by: Hiroki Inui
- Studio: Tokyo Movie Shinsha
- Released: November 10, 1979
- Runtime: 95 minutes
- Anime film

Ganbare!! Tabuchi-kun!! 2nd Gekitō Pennant Race
- Directed by: Tsutomu Shibayama
- Produced by: Yutaka Fujioka; Mataichirō Yamamoto
- Written by: Masaki Tsuji others
- Music by: Kensuke Kyō; Hiroki Inui
- Studio: Tokyo Movie Shinsha
- Released: May 3, 1980
- Runtime: 94 minutes
- Anime film

Ganbare!! Tabuchi-kun!! Hatsu Warai 3rd Aa Tsuppari Jinsei
- Directed by: Tsutomu Shibayama
- Produced by: Yutaka Fujioka; Mataichirō Yamamoto
- Written by: Shōichirō Ōkubo others
- Music by: Kensuke Kyō; Hiroki Inui
- Studio: Tokyo Movie Shinsha
- Released: December 13, 1980
- Runtime: 96 minutes
- Manga

Tabuchi-kun
- Written by: Hisaichi Ishii
- Published by: Bunshun
- Original run: 1985 – 1989
- Volumes: 5

Ganbare!! Tabuchi-kun!! (Japanese: がんばれ!!タブチくん!!; lit. "Good Luck!! Tabuchi-kun!!"), is a yonkoma manga series by Hisaichi Ishii which ran in the weekly Manga Action magazine from 1978 to 1979 in Japan. After that series ended, Ishii continued creating more baseball gag comics which were then collected under the title Tabuchi-kun (タブチくん) and released from 1985 to 1989.

The main character of the gag comic series is based on (and named for) Kōichi Tabuchi, a Japanese professional baseball player. While in most instances, the character in the manga is referred to using katakana characters, the kanji used for the real Tabuchi were used in one instance.

A series of three anime films based on the manga were released in 1979 and 1980.

== Collections ==
=== Ganbare!! Tabuchi-kun!! ===
- Volume 1, ISBN none, January 1, 1979, Futabasha
- Volume 2, ISBN none, June 20, 1979, Futabasha
- Volume 3, ISBN none, December 28, 1979, Futabasha

=== Tabuchi-kun ===
- Hello Tabuchi (こんにちはタブチくん, Konnichi wa Tabuchi-kun) (vol.1)

ISBN none, June 30, 1985, Futabasha

- Ah! Pro Baseball (ああ!プロ野球, Aa! Puro Yakyū) (vol.2)

ISBN none, December 8, 1985, Futabasha

- Everyone's Pro Baseball (みんなのプロ野球, Minna no Puro Yakyū) (vol.3)

ISBN none, November 28, 1986, Futabasha

- Our Baseball (わしらのベースボール, Washira no Bēsubōru) (vol.4)

ISBN 4-575-93117-9, April 29, 1988, Futabasha

- Your Baseball (あんたのベースボール, Anata no Bēsubōru) (vol.5)

ISBN 4-575-93160-8, May 14, 1989, Futabasha
