= Hiroshi Ogawa (animator) =

Animator

Hiroshi Ogawa (小川 博司, Ogawa Hiroshi) (August 12, 1951 – August 7, 2013) was a Japanese animator. In rare cases, his name is credited in hiragana.

In March 1976, he graduated from Tokyo Designer Gakuin College and joined Tsuchida Production soon afterward. Following Tsuchida's dissolution in March 1983, Ogawa established Studio 501. Afterward, he was attached to Disney Japan (now The Answer Studio) from April 1987 to March 1988 and freelanced for Shin-Ei Animation starting April 1989. He notably served as the animation director of Crayon Shin-chan. In 2006, he was inaugurated as a professor in Kyoto Seika University's animation department.

On August 7, 2013, at 9:20 A.M., Ogawa died from a stomach cancer-induced colon infection at the age of 62.

== Filmography ==
=== Television animation ===
- Dokaben (Key animator, 1976–1979)
- Yakyūkyō no Uta (Key animator, 1977–1979)
- Ojamanga Yamada-kun (Storyboard artist and key animator, 1980–1982)
- Sasuga no Sarutobi (Animation director, 1982–1984)
- Lupin III Part III (Animation director, 1984–1985)
- ThunderCats (Animation director, 1985) (Japanese-American collaboration, not aired in Japan)
- Maison Ikkoku (Animation director, 1986–1988)
- Shin Maple Town Monogatari: Palm Town Hen (Animation director, 1987)
- Chip 'n Dale Rescue Rangers (Animation director, 1989–1990)
- Gatapishi (Character designer, chief animation director and series director, 1990–1991)
- Dororonpaa! (Character designer, chief animation director, key animator, storyboard artist and series director, 1991)
- 21 Emon (Animation director, 1991–1992)
- Crayon Shin-chan (Character designer, animation director, screenplay writer and storyboard artist, 1992–2007, 2012–2013)
- Ojarumaru (Storyboard artist, 1998–1999) (Name credited in hiragana)
- Nonochan (Character designer, 2001–2002) (Name credited in hiragana)
- Kotencotenco (Ending key animation, 2005–2006)
- Zenmai Zamurai (Storyboard artist and animation director, 2006–2010) (Name credited in hiragana)

=== Theatrical animation ===
- Grave of the Fireflies (Key animator, 1988)
- Crayon Shin-chan: Action Kamen vs Leotard Devil (Character designer, 1993)
- Arashi no Yoru ni (Key animator, 2005)

== See also ==
- Tsuchida Production
- Shin-Ei Animation
