= Kōichi Tabuchi =

Japanese baseball player, manager, and commentator

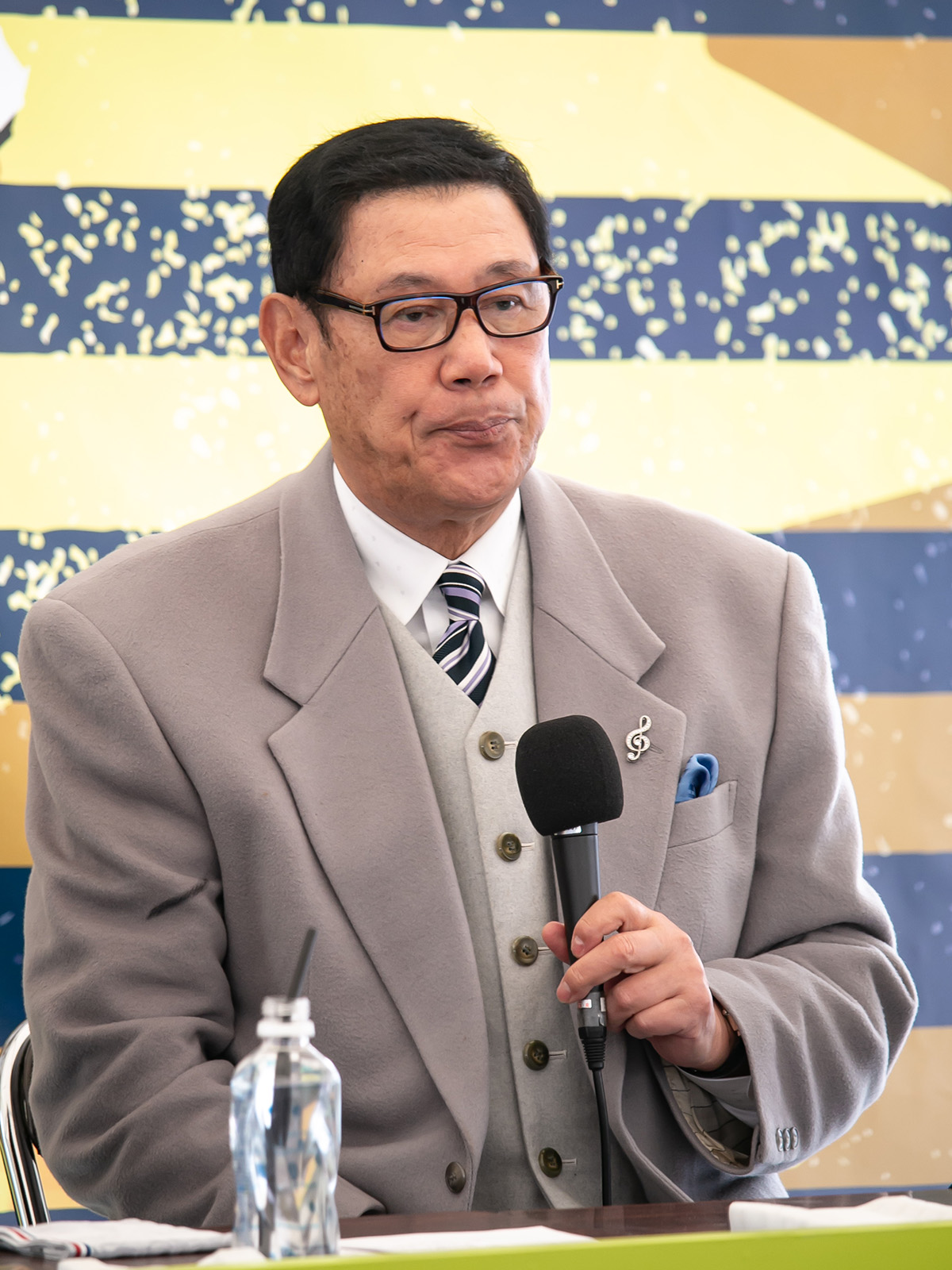
- Tabuchi in 2019
- Head and hitting coach (former Catcher, First baseman, Designated Hitter / Manager)
- Born: September 24, 1946 (age 80); Toshima, Tokyo, Japan
- Batted: Right Threw: Right

NPB debut
- April 12, 1969, for the Hanshin Tigers

Last appearance
- September 29, 1984, for the Seibu Lions

NBP statistics
- Hits: 1532
- Home runs: 474
- Base on balls: 823
- Runs batted in: 1135
- Batting average: .260
- Slugging percentage: .535

Teams
- As player: Hanshin Tigers (1969–1978); Seibu Lions (1979–1984); As manager: Fukuoka Daiei Hawks (1990–1992); As coach: Hanshin Tigers (2002–2003); Tohoku Rakuten Golden Eagles (2011–2012)

Career highlights and awards
- Regular season: 2x Japan Series champion (1982, 1983); NPB Rookie of the Year (1969); Central League Home Run Champion (1975); 5× Central League Best Nine Award (1972‍–‍1976); 2× Central League Golden Glove Award (1973, 1974); Records: Four consecutive home runs at-bats (1973); 13 consecutive times on base (1974)

Member of the Japanese

Baseball Hall of Fame
- Induction: 2020

Kōichi Tabuchi (田淵 幸一, Tabuchi Kōichi; born September 24, 1946) is a Japanese former professional baseball player, manager, and commentator. During his career, Tabuchi played for the Hanshin Tigers and the Seibu Lions. Tabuchi played catcher for the Hanshin Tigers from 1969 and 1978, where his combination with pitcher Yutaka Enatsu was called the "Golden Battery".

Always a long-range hitter, Tabuchi was nicknamed home run artist because of the high-in-the-sky, long trajectory of his home runs. Although his career total of 474 home runs is far below Sadaharu Oh's 868, his frequency nearly matched Oh's. Tabuchi hit a home run once every 12.41 at-bats, while Oh did once every 10.66. In this statistic he is second only to Oh among sluggers who have logged 300 or more home runs.

Known as Mr. Tiger (along with Fumio Fujimura, Minoru Murayama, and Masayuki Kakefu), Tabuchi has served as the chairman of Hanshin Tigers Old Boys' Committee since November 2009.

== Biography ==
=== Hanshin Tigers ===
Dubbed the "Hosei Trio" of Hosei University baseball team together with teammates Masaru Tomita and Koji Yamamoto, Tabuchi was named the first draft choice in 1968 by the Tigers, although he had commented earlier he would not join any other team than the Yomiuri Giants. Joining the Tigers after all, he appeared in 81 games during the first season, delivering 22 homers, and marked the highest throw-out rate of attempted steals of the year, which enabled him win the Central League's Rookie of the Year.

In a game against Hiroshima Carp on August 26, 1970, Tabuchi was hit in his head and directly onto his left ear at bat. He was badly bleeding from his ear, and was carried to a hospital immediately where he stayed unconscious for two days. He was obliged to be hospitalized for three months with his left eardrum found severely damaged, missing out the rest of the season. This incident led to the introduction of ear-flapped helmet in Japan. The following year, Tabuchi was for the second time hospitalized for a period over a month, this time shortly before the season and suffering from nephritis that allowed him join the team only in June.

In 1973, Tabuchi marked the league's highest throw-out rate for the second time. In 1974, he blasted more than 40 shots over the fence, ending up at 45 homers, four round-trippers behind Sadaharu Oh.

In 1975, Tabuchi was crowned to home run king of the Central League with 43 homers, batting average 0.303, putting a brief halt to Sadaharu Oh's winning another title after his thirteen-year streak beginning in 1962.

During Tabuchi's last seasons with the Tigers, he often turned the wrong ways while chasing after foul flies.

=== Seibu Lions ===
After the 1978 season, Tabuchi was traded to the Seibu Lions. With the Lions he won the Japan Series two years in a row, in 1982 and 1983.

=== Post-player career ===
After his 1984 retirement, he managed the Fukuoka Daiei Hawks and coached the Tigers.

From 1985 to 1989, again from 1993 to 2001, and again beginning in 2004 he has been a commentator for Tokyo Broadcasting System, Inc. (TBS). Tabuchi is the head batting coach of the Japan national baseball team.

== Data ==
- Jersey number:
  - 22 (1969–1984)
  - 81 (1990–1992)
  - 88 (2002–2003, 2011–2012)

== Awards and honors ==
- Rookie of the year, Central League, 1969
- Home run king, Central League, 1975
- Matsutaro Shoriki Award, 1983

== See also ==
- List of top Nippon Professional Baseball home run hitters
- List of Nippon Professional Baseball players with 1,000 runs batted in
- Ganbare!! Tabuchi-kun!!
