= Music of the Maison Ikkoku series =

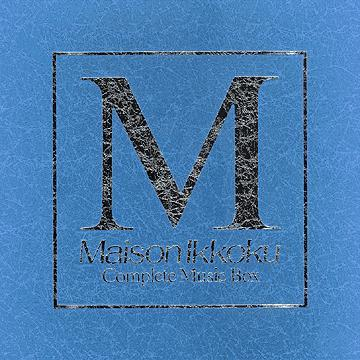
Cover of the Maison Ikkoku Complete Music Box

This is a list of music of the Maison Ikkoku series. It lists individual theme and other songs, singles, as well as music, drama, and collection albums from the anime and live-action releases as well as game soundtracks.

== Theme songs ==
Maison Ikkoku had an anime television series (96 episodes from March 1986 to March 1988), a live-action film (10 October 1986), an anime television film (February 1988), three OVAs (1988–1992), and a two episode live-action film series (2007–2008). For the most part, all of them had different theme and incidental music.

=== Television series themes ===
The opening and ending theme songs in the anime television series changed periodically, and were sung by several different popular singers and groups from Japan and one from Ireland, including Anzen Chitai, Takao Kisugi, Kiyonori Matsuo, Kōzō Murashita, Gilbert O'Sullivan, Picasso, and Yuki Saito.

Maison Ikkoku television series themes
Episode(s)	Opening theme		Closing theme	
Episode(s)	Title	Artist	Title	Artist
1–14	"Kanashimi yo Konnichi wa" (悲しみよこんにちは; lit. 'Hello Sadness')	Yuki Saito	"Ashita Hareru ka" (あした晴れるか; lit. 'Will Tomorrow be Brighter?')	Takao Kisugi
15–23	"Kanashimi yo Konnichi wa" (悲しみよこんにちは; lit. 'Hello Sadness')	Yuki Saito	"Ci-ne-ma" (シ・ネ・マ, Shi-ne-ma)	Picasso
24	"Alone Again (Naturally)"	Gilbert O'Sullivan	"Get Down"	Gilbert O'Sullivan
25–33	"Kanashimi yo Konnichi wa" (悲しみよこんにちは; lit. 'Hello Sadness')	Yuki Saito	"Ci-ne-ma" (シ・ネ・マ, Shi-ne-ma)	Picasso
34–37	"Kanashimi yo Konnichi wa" (悲しみよこんにちは; lit. 'Hello Sadness')	Yuki Saito	"Fantasy" (ファンタジー, Fantajii)	Picasso
38–52	"Suki Sa" (好きさ; lit. 'I Love You')	Anzen Chitai	"Fantasy" (ファンタジー, Fantajii)	Picasso
53–76	"Sunny Shiny Morning" (サニーシャイニーモーニング)	Kiyonori Matsuo	"Sayonara no Dessan" (サヨナラの素描; lit. 'Sketch of a Goodbye')	Picasso
77–96	"Hidamari" (陽だまり; lit. 'Sunny Spot')	Kōzō Murashita	"Begin the Night" (ビギン・ザ・ナイト)	Picasso

=== Live-action movie theme ===
The live action film, released 10 October 1986 through Toei and Kitty Film in Japan, reused the two Gilbert O'Sullivan songs as themes. "Alone Again (Naturally)" and "Get Down" had previously been used as the theme songs for episode 24 of the anime television series on 3 September 1986. Outside of those two themes, the soundtrack for the film was composed by Joe Hisaishi.

=== Anime television movie theme ===
"Glass Kiss", the theme song for Maison Ikkoku Final (めぞん一刻 完結篇, Mezon Ikkoku Kanketsuhen), was sung by Rika Himenogi. It was released as a single on 3 February 1988 by Kitty Records. It reached #21 on the Oricon charts and sold over 260,000 copies.

=== OVA themes ===
There were three OVAs released from 1988 to 1992.

- Highlights: Through the Passing Seasons was released on 25 September 1988 and had music composed by Kenji Kawai and Takao Sugiyama.
- Side Story: Ikkoku Island Flirtation Story was released 31 January 1991 and used "Kanashimi yo Konnichi wa" as a theme song. Additional music was composed by Kenji Kawai, Takao Sugiyama, and Hideharu Mori.
- Prelude, When the Cherry Blossoms Return in the Spring was released 25 June 1992 and also used "Kanashimi yo Konnichi wa" as a theme song. Additional music was composed by Kenji Kawai and Takao Sugiyama.

=== Live-action television film series ===
The ending theme for the 2007–2008 two-part Maison Ikkoku television drama series was Mamotte Agetai by Yumi Matsutoya. The song was originally released on 21 June 1981 through Toshiba EMI. At that time, it reached #2 on the Oricon weekly charts and was ranked #10 for singles released in 1981. It sold over 695,000 copies.

The other music used in the drama series was composed by Yoshikazu Suo.

== Character songs ==
This section contains character songs, or songs sung by a voice actor from the series while in character.

=== Koisuru Ki-Mo-Chi ===
Koisuru Ki-Mo-Chi: Kyoko Otonashi 恋するKI・MO・CHI 音無響子

Recording by Sumi Shimamoto
- Released: 25 September 1987
- Length: 39:33
- Language: Japanese
- Label: Kitty Records

Koisuru Ki-Mo-Chi: Kyoko Otonashi (恋するKI・MO・CHI 音無響子, Koisuru Ki-Mo-Chi: Otonashi Kyōko) was released on LP, cassette, and CD by Kitty Records on 25 September 1987. It featured 15 tracks of incidental music, theme songs, and character songs. All vocals on the album are by Sumi Shimamoto in character as Kyoko Otonashi.

Track listing

1. "Hello Sadness" (悲しみよこんにちは, Kanashimi yo Konnichi wa) (Vocals: Kyoko Otonashi)
2. SC-1
3. "Melody" (メロディー, Merodī) (Vocals: Kyoko Otonashi)
4. SC-2
5. "Premonition" (予感, Yokan) (Vocals: Kyoko Otonashi)
6. SC-3
7. "Follow You" (フォロ－・ユー, Forō Yū) (Vocals: Kyoko Otonashi)
8. SC-4
9. "Toward the Entrance to Dreams" (夢の入口へ…, Yume no Iriguchi e...) (Vocals: Kyoko Otonashi)
10. SC-5
11. "Excited Heart" (ときめき, Tokimeki) (Vocals: Kyoko Otonashi)
12. SC-6
13. "Sunny Shiny Morning" (サニー・シャイニー・モーニング, Sanī Shainī Mōningu) (Vocals: Kyoko Otonashi)
14. SC-7
15. "Endless" (エンドレス, Endoresu) (Vocals: Kyoko Otonashi)

=== Party Album ===
Maison Ikkoku Party Album: Chachamaru Karaoke Battle めぞん一刻パーティーアルバム ～茶々丸カラオケバトル～

Recording
- Released: 21 December 1992
- Length: 69:09
- Language: Japanese
- Label: Kitty Records

Maison Ikkoku Party Album: Chachamaru Karaoke Battle (めぞん一刻パーティーアルバム ～茶々丸カラオケバトル～, Mezon Ikkoku Pātī Arubamu: Chachamaru Karaoke Batoru) is a drama album that was released on CD by Kitty Records on 21 December 1992. It featured 16 tracks, including 8 tracks of theme songs sung by cast members of the Maison Ikkoku anime television series.

Track listing

1. "Opening" (オープニング, Ōpuningu) (drama)
2. "Opening Theme 'Toward the Entrance to Dreams...'" (オープニングテーマ『夢の入口へ…』, Ōpuningu Tēma 'Yume no Iriguchi e...') (Vocals: Sumi Shimamoto)
3. "Chachamaru Karaoke Battle" (茶々丸カラオケバトル, Chachamaru Karaoke Batoru) (drama)
4. "Ci-ne-ma" (シ・ネ・マ, Shi-ne-ma) (Vocals: Kazuyo Aoki as by Hanae Ichinose)
5. "Will Tomorrow Be Sunny?" (あした晴れるか, Ashita Hareru ka) (Vocals: Shigeru Chiba as by Yotsuya and Issei Futamata as by Yūsaku Godai)
6. "Sunny Shiny Morning" (サニーシャイニーモーニング, Sanī Shainī Mōningu) (Vocals: Miina Tominaga as by Kozue Nanao)
7. "Love Ya" (好きさ, Suki sa) (Vocals: Yūko Mita as by Akemi Roppongi)
8. "Hello Sadness" (悲しみよこんにちは, Kanashimi yo Konnichi wa) (Vocals: Hisako Kyōda as by Yukari Godai)
9. "Fantasy" (ファンタジー, Fantajī) (Vocals: Sumi Shimamoto as by Kyoko Otonashi and Issei Futamata as by Yūsaku Godai)
10. "Ending Theme 'Begin the Night'" (エンディングテーマ『ビギン・ザ・ナイト』, Endingu Tēma 'Bigin za Naito') (Vocals: Picasso)
11. "Ci-ne-ma" (karaoke version)
12. "Will Tomorrow Be Sunny?" (karaoke version)
13. "Sunny Shiny Morning" (karaoke version)
14. "Love Ya" (karaoke version)
15. "Hello Sadness" (karaoke version)
16. "Fantasy" (karaoke version)

== Singles ==
Listed in chronological release order.

Title	Japanese Title	Singer/Group	Released	Catalog #	Label	Notes	Ref.
Kanashimi yo Konnichi wa / Ohikkoshi, Wasuremono	悲しみよこんにちは / お引越し・忘れもの	Yuki Saito	21 March 1986	7A0562	Canyon Records	Reached #3 on the Oricon weekly charts.	
Alone Again (Naturally) / Get Down	アローン・アゲイン / ゲット・ダウン	Gilbert O'Sullivan	25 March 1986	H30K-20022	Kitty Records		
Ashita Hareru ka / Mō Sukoshi Tōku	あした晴れるか / もう少し遠く	Takao Kisugi	25 April 1986	7DS0109	Kitty Records	Reached #57 on the Oricon weekly charts.	
Ci-ne-ma / Kemono-tachi no Bakansu	シ・ネ・マ / 獣達のバカンス	Picasso	2 July 1986	10241-07	VAP	Originally released in 1985 with a different B-side.	
Fantasy / Nureta Hitomi no Pikuchā	ファンタジー / 濡れた瞳のピクチャー	Picasso	1 November 1986	7DS0135	Kitty Records		
Suki Sa / Omoide ni Tsutsumarete	好きさ / 想い出につつまれて	Anzen Chitai	3 December 1986	7DS0150	Kitty Records	Reached #4 on the Oricon weekly charts.	
Sunny Shiny Morning / Younger Girl	サニーシャイニーモーニング / ヤンガーガール	Kiyonori Matsuo	25 February 1987	7DX1477	Polydor		
Sayonara no Dessan / Suna no Atelier	サヨナラの素描 / 砂のAtelier	Picasso	25 May 1987	7DS0141	Kitty Records		
Hidamari / Shiroi Hana no Sakugoro	陽だまり / 白い花の咲く頃	Kōzō Murashita	21 September 1987	07SH1979	CBS Sony	Reached #61 on the Oricon weekly charts.	
Begin the Night / Utsukushisa ga, Moeru	ビギン・ザ・ナイト / 愛しさが、燃える	Picasso	25 September 1987	7DS0151	Kitty Records		
Glass Kiss / Tears of Needles and Threads of Wind	硝子のキッス / 涙の針と風の糸	Rika Himenogi	3 February 1988	7DS0154	Kitty Records	Reached #21 on the Oricon charts	

== Soundtrack albums ==
Albums are listed in chronological release order.

=== Music Blend ===
Maison Ikkoku Music Collection: Music Blend めぞん一刻 音楽編 ミュージックブレンド

Soundtrack album by Picasso, Yuki Saito, Sumi Shimamoto, and Takao Kisugi
- Released: 21 September 1986 (LP, CT); 21 December 1990 (CD)
- Length: 44:31 (CD)
- Language: Japanese
- Label: Canyon

Maison Ikkoku Music Collection: Music Blend (めぞん一刻 音楽編 ミュージックブレンド, Mezon Ikkoku Ongakuhen Myūjikku Burendo) was released by Kitty Records on LP and cassette on 21 September 1986, and on CD on 21 December 1990. It featured 26 tracks of incidental music, theme songs, and character songs. Vocal artists included on the album included Picasso, Yuki Saito, Sumi Shimamoto, and Takao Kisugi. This album contains almost the same content as Music Cocktail, with the only difference being the first track.

Track listing

1. "Hello Sadness" (悲しみよこんにちは, Kanashimi yo Konnichi wa) (Vocals: Yuki Saito)
2. "Bridge #5" (ブリッジその5, Burijji Sono 5)
3. "Spring" (春, Haru)
4. "Twilight" (夕暮, Yūgure)
5. "Drunken Steps" (千鳥足, Chidori Ashi)
6. "Summer Clouds" (夏の雲, Natsu no Kumo)
7. "Winter" (冬, Fuyu)
8. "Premonition" (予感, Yokan) (Vocals: Sumi Shimamoto)
9. "Sadness" (悲しみ, Kanashimi)
10. "Sheltering from the Rain" (雨やどり, Amayadori)
11. "An Evening Alone" (ひとりの夜, Hitori no Yoru)
12. "Will Tomorrow Be Sunny?" (あした晴れるか, Ashita Hareru ka) (Vocals: Takao Kisugi)
13. "Toward the Entrance to Dreams" (夢の入口へ…, Yume no Iriguchi e...) (Vocals: Sumi Shimamoto)
14. "Bridge #11" (ブリッジその11, Burijji Sono 11)
15. "Within a Dream" (夢の中, Yume no Naka)
16. "Autumn" (秋, Aki)
17. "Strange Company" (不思議なお客, Fushigi na Okyaku)
18. "After the Rain" (雨あがり, Ame Agari)
19. "Ominous Sign" (不気味な気配, Bukimi na Kehai)
20. "The Way Home" (帰り道, Kaeri Michi)
21. "Doubletime" (かけ足, Kakeashi)
22. "Evening Rain" (夜の雨, Yoru no Ame)
23. "Rainbow" (虹, Niji)
24. "Midnight Visitor" (真夜中の訪問者, Mayonaka no Hōmonsha)
25. "Unsatisfied Desire" (もの想い, Mono Omoi)
26. "Ci-ne-ma" (シ・ネ・マ, Shi-me-ma) (Vocals: Picasso)

=== Music Cocktail ===
Maison Ikkoku Music Cocktail めぞん一刻 ミュージックカクテル

Soundtrack album by Takao Kisugi, Picasso, and Sumi Shimamoto
- Released: 21 December 1986
- Length: 44:35
- Language: Japanese
- Label: Kitty Records

Maison Ikkoku Music Cocktail (めぞん一刻 ミュージックカクテル, Mezon Ikkoku Myūjikku Kakuteru) was released on CD by Kitty Records on 21 December 1986. It featured 26 tracks of incidental music, theme songs, and character songs. Vocal artists on the album include Takao Kisugi, Picasso, and Sumi Shimamoto. This album contains almost the same content as Music Blend, with the only difference being the first track.

Track listing

1. "Fantasy" (ファンタジー, Fantajī) (Vocals: Picasso)
2. "Bridge #5" (ブリッジその5, Burijji Sono 5)
3. "Spring" (春, Haru)
4. "Twilight" (夕暮, Yūgure)
5. "Drunken Steps" (千鳥足, Chidori Ashi)
6. "Summer Clouds" (夏の雲, Natsu no Kumo)
7. "Winter" (冬, Fuyu)
8. "Premonition" (予感, Yokan) (Vocals: Sumi Shimamoto)
9. "Sadness" (悲しみ, Kanashimi)
10. "Sheltering from the Rain" (雨やどり, Amayadori)
11. "An Evening Alone" (ひとりの夜, Hitori no Yoru)
12. "Will Tomorrow Be Sunny?" (あした晴れるか, Ashita Hareru ka) (Vocals: Takao Kisugi)
13. "Toward the Entrance to Dreams" (夢の入口へ…, Yume no Iriguchi e...) (Vocals: Sumi Shimamoto)
14. "Bridge #11" (ブリッジその11, Burijji Sono 11)
15. "Within a Dream" (夢の中, Yume no Naka)
16. "Autumn" (秋, Aki)
17. "Strange Company" (不思議なお客, Fushigi na Okyaku)
18. "After the Rain" (雨あがり, Ame Agari)
19. "Ominous Sign" (不気味な気配, Bukimi na Kehai)
20. "The Way Home" (帰り道, Kaeri Michi)
21. "Doubletime" (かけ足, Kakeashi)
22. "Evening Rain" (夜の雨, Yoru no Ame)
23. "Rainbow" (虹, Niji)
24. "Midnight Visitor" (真夜中の訪問者, Mayonaka no Hōmonsha)
25. "Unsatisfied Desire" (もの想い, Mono Omoi)
26. "Ci-ne-ma" (シ・ネ・マ, Shi-me-ma) (Vocals: Picasso)

=== Music Blend 2 ===
Maison Ikkoku Music Blend 2 めぞん一刻 ミュージックブレンド2

Soundtrack album by Anzen Chitai, Kiyonori Matsuo, Picasso, and Yuki Saito
- Released: 1 July 1987
- Length: 49:43 (CD)
- Language: Japanese
- Label: Kitty Records

Maison Ikkoku Music Blend 2 (めぞん一刻 ミュージックブレンド2, Mezon Ikkoku Myūjikku Burendo 2) was released by Kitty Records on LP, cassette, and CD on 1 July 1987. It featured 27 tracks of incidental music and theme songs. Vocal artists included on the album included Anzen Chitai, Kiyonori Matsuo, Picasso, and Yuki Saito.

Track listing

1. "A Bell Tolls at Dawn" (暁に鐘は鳴る, Akatsuki ni Kane wa Naru)
2. "Sunny Shiny Morning" (サニー シャイニー モーニング) (Vocals: Kiyonori Matsuo)
3. "Mr. Sōichirō!!" (惣一郎さんっ!!, Sōichirō-san!!)
4. "Lunchbox and Broom" (お弁当とホウキ, Obentō to Hōki)
5. "Akemi's Toothbrush" (朱美のハブラシ, Akemi no Haburashi)
6. "Hello Sadness" (悲しみよこんにちは) (Vocals: Yuki Saito)
7. "Sunny Confession" (陽だまりの告白, Hidamari no Kokuhaku)
8. "Mrs. Ichinose Is Going Today, Too" (一の瀬さんは今日も行く, Ichinose-san wa Kyō mo Iku)
9. "Tennis Balls and Gossip" (テニスボールと噂話, Tenisu Bōru to Uwasabanashi)
10. "Incident" (事件, Jiken)
11. "Goodbye Sketch" (サヨナラの素描, Sayonara no Dessan) (Vocals: Picasso)
12. "Love Ya" (好きさ, Suki sa) (Vocals: Anzen Chitai)
13. "First Evening Star Halfway up the Hill" (坂の途中の一番星, Saka no Tochū no Ichibanboshi)
14. "Mitaka Godai!!" (三鷹・五代!!)
15. "Desire" (願い, Negai)
16. "Kissing Scene" (キッスのある情景, Kissu no Aru Jōkei)
17. "Plum Brandy Granny" (梅酒婆あ, Umeshu Babaa)
18. "My Path's Mutt" (行きがけの駄犬, Ikigake no Daken)
19. "Wimp" (弱虫, Yowamushi)
20. "Fantasy" (ファンタジー, Fantajī) (Vocals: Picasso)
21. "Non-returning Boyfriend" (帰らざる彼, Kaerazaru Kare)
22. "Dream Night" (夢一夜, Yume Ichiya)
23. "Yotsuya's Motives" (四谷の思惑, Yotsuya no Omowaku)
24. "Party Refusal" (宴会謝絶, Enkai Shasetsu)
25. "Complicated Evening" (複雑夜, Fukuzatsuya)
26. "Miss Kyoko...!!" (響子さん…!!, Kyōko-san...!!)
27. "Love, Before Daybreak" (愛・夜明け前, Ai, Yoakemae)

=== Final OST ===
Maison Ikkoku Final Original Soundtrack めぞん一刻 完結篇 オリジナルサウンドトラック

Soundtrack album
- Released: 21 February 1988
- Length: 35:56
- Language: Japanese
- Label: Kitty Records

Maison Ikkoku Final Original Soundtrack (めぞん一刻 完結篇 オリジナルサウンドトラック, Mezon Ikkoku Kanketsuhen Orijinaru Saundotorakku) was released on LP, cassette, and CD by Kitty Records on 21 February 1988. It featured the theme song and 15 tracks of incidental music from the theatrical movie. The theme song vocal artist was Rika Himenogi.

Track listing

1. "I Love You"
2. "Widow's Lover"
3. "A Breath of Air"
4. "American Woman"
5. "In the Moonlight"
6. "Crystal Heart"
7. "6•6•6"
8. "Confetti" (紙吹雪, Kamifubuki)
9. "Wedding Dress"
10. "Cheers!!" (乾杯!!, Kanpai!!)
11. "Grandmother"
12. "The Moon and the Guitar" (月とギター, Tsuki to Gitā)
13. "She-Inn"
14. "I Need Her"
15. "The Merry-go-round Couple" (メリーゴーラウンドのふたり, Merīgōraundo no Futari)
16. "Glass Kiss" (硝子のキッス, Garasu no Kissu) (Vocals: Rika Himenogi)

=== Music Sour ===
Maison Ikkoku Music Sour: Unpublished TV BGM Collection めぞん一刻 Music Sour ～未発表TV・BGM集～

Soundtrack album
- Released: 21 December 1988
- Length: 60:49 (CD)
- Language: Japanese
- Label: Kitty Records

Maison Ikkoku Music Sour: Unpublished TV BGM Collection (めぞん一刻 Music Sour ～未発表TV・BGM集～, Mezon Ikkoku Music Sour: Mihappyō TV BGM-shū) was released on LP, cassette, and CD by Kitty Records on 21 December 1988. It featured 61 tracks of incidental music and instrumental versions of two of the theme songs. Twelve of the tracks were not included in the LP release.

Track listing

Songs marked with ♦ are not on the LP.

1. "Bridge-K1" (ブリッジ-K1, Burijji-K1)
2. "Hello Sadness (Instrumental)" (悲しみよこんにちは（インスト）, Kanashimi yo Konnichi wa (Insuto))
3. "Bridge-K2" (ブリッジ-K2, Burijji-K2)
4. "I'm Fine..." (お元気ですよ…, Ogenki Desu yo...)
5. "Ominous Presence #2" (不気味な気配 その2, Fukimi na Kehai Sono 2)
6. "Unsatisfied Desire" (もの想い, Mono Omoi)
7. "Bridge #1" (ブリッジ その1, Burijji Sono 1)
8. "The Uneasy Life of a Failed Student" (不安な浪人生活, Fuan na Rounin Seikatsu)
9. "Seal Case Theme" (印籠のテーマ, Inrō no Tēma)
10. "Please Look Up at the Moon in the Night Sky" (見上げてごらん夜空の月を, Miagete Goran Yozora no Tsuki o)
11. "Bridge #2" (ブリッジ その2, Burijji Sono 2)
12. "Miss Kyoko, Please Give Me a Hand" (響子さん、お手をどうぞ, Kyōko-san, Ote o Dōzo)
13. "Late Again..." (今度も遅刻だ…, Kondo mo Chikoku...)
14. "A Dream Within a Dream" (夢の中の夢, Yume no Naka no Yume)
15. "Bridge #3" (ブリッジ その3, Burijji Sono 3)
16. "Marvelous Mood" (不思議な気分, Fushigi na Kibun)
17. "Pleasant Stroll" (楽しいお散歩, Tanoshii Osanpo)
18. "Winter #2" (冬 その2, Fuyu Sono 2)
19. "Autumn #2" (秋 その2, Aki Sono 2) ♦
20. "Double-time #2" (駆け足 その2, Kakeashi Sono 2) ♦
21. "Ah, I Really Have no Pity" (あ～情けなや, Aa Nasakenaya)
22. "Alone at the Window" (窓辺でひとり, Madobe de Hitori)
23. "Bridge #4" (ブリッジ その4, Burijji Sono 4)
24. "Minor Escape Theme" (小脱走のテーマ, Kodassō no Tēma)
25. "Hmph! It's Spring, Right?" (もう!春ですね, Mō! Haru Desu ne)
26. "Unrequited Love" (片思い, Kataomoi)
27. "Bridge #5" (ブリッジ その5, Burijji Sono 5)
28. "What're You Looking for, Huh?" (捜し物はなんでしょね, Sagashimono wa Nan Desho ne)
29. "Strange Parade" (不思議な行進, Fushigi na Kōshin) ♦
30. "Changed Delusion" (変わった盲想, Kawatta Mōsō) ♦
31. "Strange Company #2" (不思議なお客 その2, Fushigi na Okyaku Sono 2) ♦
32. "Midnight Stroll" (真夜中のお散歩, Mayonaka no Osanpo)
33. "Bridge-A" (ブリッジ-A, Burijji-A)
34. "Ikkokukan Theme" (一刻館のテーマ, Ikkokukan no Tēma)
35. "If Ascending Clock Hill" (時計坂を登れば, Tokeizaka o Noboreba)
36. "All-night Dream #2" (夢一夜 その2, Yume Ichiya Sono 2)
37. "It Serves You Right?!" (ざまあみろ?!, Zamaamiro?!)
38. "Party in the Entrance" (宴会は玄関で, Enkai wa Genkan)
39. "Happiness Curve" (しあわせ曲線, Shiawase Kyokusen)
40. "Two-Story Autumn" (二階建ての秋, Nikaidate no Aki)
41. "Western Fried Wontons" (ウェスタン・アゲワンタン, Uesutan Agewantan) ♦
42. "Asuna's Eyes" (明日菜の瞳, Asuna no Hitomi)
43. "Bewildering Romance" (戸惑いロマンス, Tomodoi Romansu)
44. "Yotsuya's Intentions Again" (四谷の思惑再び, Yotsuya no Omowaku Futatabi) ♦
45. "Godai's Job Hunt" (五代の就職, Godai no Shūshoku) ♦
46. "Mrs. Ichinose Will Also Go Tomorrow" (一の瀬さんは明日も行く, Ichinose-san wa Ashita mo Iku) ♦
47. "Fantasy in a Dream" (夢中のファンタジー, Yumechū no Fantajī)
48. "Apology in the Clear Weather" (快晴でゴメンね!, Kaisei de Gomen ne!)
49. "Suddenly Manager" (いきなり管理人, Ikinari Kanrinin) ♦
50. "Let's Kiss" (レッツ・キッス, Rettsu Kissu)
51. "Nurturing Is Sports" (保育はスポーツ, Hōiku wa Supōtsu) ♦
52. "Sōichirō and the Fly" (惣一郎とハエ, Sōichirō to Hae)
53. "Akemi Begins" (朱美始まる, Akemi Hajimaru) ♦
54. "The Age of Lovesickness" (恋愛狂時代, Ren'aikyou Jidai)
55. "Wimp #2" (弱虫 その2, Yowamushi: Sono 2)
56. "The North Ikkokkukan Is...Rain" (北の一刻館は…雨, Kita no Ikkokukan wa...Ame)
57. "Mitaka's Goodbye" (三鷹のサヨナラ, Mitaka no Sayonara)
58. "Kyoko: I'll Wait" (響子 待ちます, Kyōko: Machimasu)
59. "Propose" (プロポーズ, Puropōzu)
60. "Quietly, Surely, Spring Came" (静かに確かに春がきた, Shizuka ni Tasuka ni Haru ga Kita)
61. "Fantasy (Instrumental)" (ファンタジー（インスト）, Fantajī (Insuto))

=== Music Shake ===
Maison Ikkoku Music Shake: Unpublished TV BGM Collection Vol. 2 めぞん一刻 Music Shake ～未発表TV・BGM集Vol.2～

Soundtrack album by Gilbert O'Sullivan and Picasso
- Released: 21 December 1989
- Length: 53:21
- Language: Japanese
- Label: Kitty Records

Maison Ikkoku Music Shake: Unpublished TV BGM Collection Vol. 2 (めぞん一刻 Music Shake ～未発表TV・BGM集Vol.2～, Mezon Ikkoku Music Sour: Mihappyō TV BGM-shū Vol.2) was released on cassette and CD by Kitty Records on 21 December 1989. It featured 56 tracks of incidental music and theme songs. Vocal artists included on the album include Gilbert O'Sullivan and Picasso.

Track listing

1. "Bridge-K3" (ブリッジ-K3, Burijji-K3)
2. "Begin the Night" (ビギン・ザ・ナイト, Bigin za Naito) (Vocals: Picasso)
3. "Bridge #6" (ブリッジ その6, Burijji Sono 6)
4. "Hello Sadness (Instrumental 2)" (悲しみよこんにちは（インスト2）, Kanashimi yo Konnichi wa (Insuto 2))
5. "Toward a Hurrying Kyoko" (急げ響子へ, Isoge Kyōko e)
6. "Brilliant Sea Spray" (まぶしい波しぶき, Mabushii Namishibuki)
7. "Yotsuya's Prank" (四谷の悪ふざけ, Yotsuya no Warufuzake)
8. "My Foot #3" (かけ足 その3, Wake Ashi Sono 3)
9. "Party Idiots Dance" (宴会バカ踊り, Enkai Baka Odori)
10. "Uneasiness" (胸騒ぎ, Munasawagi)
11. "Wanting Confirmation of Kyoko's Feelings" (響子の気持ちを確かめたくて, Kyōko no Kimochi o Tashikametakute)
12. "Bridge #7" (ブリッジ その7, Burijji Sono 7)
13. "Wanting to Forget Sōichirō" (惣一郎を忘れたくて, Sōichirō o Wasuretakute)
14. "Collapse in the Sun" (太陽にこけろ, Taiyō ni Kokero)
15. "Anxiety Attack" (打ち寄せる不安, Uchiyoseru Fuan)
16. "A Heartthrobbing Night for Two" (ときめく2人の夜, Tokimeku Futari no Yoru)
17. "Flowers Blooming in the Pool" (プールに咲く花, Pūru ni Sakubana)
18. "Will Tomorrow Be Sunny: Intro" (あした晴れるか イントロ, Ashita Hareru ka: Intoro)
19. "Taking Shelter from the Rain #2" (雨やどり その2, Ame Yadori Sono 2)
20. "Mitaka's Smash" (三鷹のスマッシュ, Mitaka no Sumasshu)
21. "Bridge #8" (ブリッジ その8, Burijji Sono 8)
22. "A Young Girl's Radio Calisthenics" (乙女のラジオ体操, Otome no Rajio Taisō)
23. "Bridge: Tin Horn" (ブリッジ～ブリキのラッパ～, Burijji: Buriki no Rappa)
24. "Ominous Sign #2" (不気味な気配 その2, Bukimi na Kihai Sono 2)
25. "Early Afternoon Dream" (昼下がりの夢, Hiruzakari no Yume)
26. "Heartbeat" (ハートビート, Hātobīto)
27. "Godai's Sneaky Steps" (五代の忍び足, Godai no Shinobiashi)
28. "Bridge #9" (ブリッジ その9, Burijji Sono 9)
29. "Hello Sadness (Instrumental 3)" (悲しみよこんにちは（インスト3）, Kanashimi yo Konnichi wa (Insuto 3))
30. "Bridge #10" (ブリッジ その10, Burijji Sono 10)
31. "A Ghost Comes to Ikkokukan!" (一刻館にオバケが出るゾ!, Ikkokukan ni Obake ga Deru zo!)
32. "Storm Warning" (嵐の前ぶれ, Arashi no Maebure)
33. "A Sentimental Afternoon" (ほのぼのした午后, Honobonoshita Gogo)
34. "Happy Moment" (幸せなひととき, Shiwase na Hitotoki)
35. "Happy Step" (ハッピーステップ, Happī Suteppu)
36. "Summer Clouds #2" (夏の雲 その2, Natsu no Kumo Sono 2)
37. "Bridge #11" (ブリッジ その11, Burijji Sono 11)
38. "Premonition (Instrumental)" (予感（インスト）, Yokan (Insuto))
39. "The Time Godai Thinks About Kyoko" (五代が響子を想う時, Godai ga Kyōko o Omō Toki)
40. "Kyoko's Melancholy" (響子の悲しみ, Kyōko no Kanashimi)
41. "Kozue's Date" (こずえのデート, Kozue no Dēto)
42. "Ikkokukan Scandal" (一刻館騒動, Ikkokukan Sōdō)
  1. "Yotsuya's Wiles" (四谷の悪だくみ, Yotsuya no Warudakumi)
  2. "Bridge" (ブリッジ, Burijji)
  3. "It's Terrible" (大変だ, Taihen Da)
  4. "Premonition (Instrumental 2)" (予感（インスト2）, Yokan (Insuto 2))
43. "It's Sports Weather Today" (今日はスポーツ日和, Kyō wa Supōtsu Hiyori)
44. "Season of Blooming Cherry Blossoms" (桜の花咲く季節, Sakura no Hanasaku Kisetsu)
45. "Season of Dancing Leaves" (枯葉舞い散る季節, Kareha Maichiru Kisetsu)
46. "Spring Breeze Allure" (春風の誘惑, Harukaze no Yūwaku)
47. "Promenade" (遊歩道, Yūhōdō)
48. "Shining Wind" (光る風, Hikaru Kaze)
49. "Season of Falling Powder Snow" (粉雪降る季節, Koyuki Furu Kisetsu)
50. "Race with Sōichirō" (惣一郎と駆けっこ, Sōichirō to Kakekko)
51. "Wind Symphony #2" (風のシンフォニー その2, Kaze no Shinfonī Sono 2)
52. "The Running Ichinoses" (走れ一の瀬夫婦, Hashire Ichinose Fūfu)
53. "Uneasiness" (不安, Fuan)
54. "Fantasy in a Dream" (夢中のファンタジー その2, Muchū no Fantajī Sono 2)
55. "Premonition (Instrumental 3)" (予感（インスト3）, Yokan (Insuto 3))
56. "Alone Again (Naturally)" (アローン・アゲイン, Arōn Agein) (Vocals: Gilbert O'Sullivan)

=== Theme Song Best+ ===
Maison Ikkoku Theme Song Best+ めぞん一刻 テーマソングベスト+

Soundtrack album
- Released: 17 March 1999
- Language: Japanese
- Label: Pony Canyon

Maison Ikkoku Theme Song Best+ (めぞん一刻 テーマソングベスト+, Mezon Ikkoku Tēma Songu Besuto Purasu) was released on CD by Pony Canyon on 17 March 1999. It featured 14 tracks of theme and in-character songs from the TV series and theatrical film. Vocal artists included on the album included Anzen Chitai, Rika Himenogi, Takao Kisugi, Kiyonori Matsuo, Kōzō Murashita, Gilbert O'Sullivan, Picasso, Yuki Saito, and Sumi Shimamoto.

Track listing

1. "Hello Sadness" (悲しみよこんにちは, Kanashimi yo Konnichi wa) (Vocals: Yuki Saito)
2. "Will Tomorrow Be Sunny?" (あした晴れるか, Ashita Hareru ka) (Vocals: Takao Kisugi)
3. "Ci-ne-ma" (シ・ネ・マ, Shi-ne-ma) (Vocals: Picasso)
4. "Alone Again (Naturally)" (アローン・アゲイン, Arōn Agein) (Vocals: Gilbert O'Sullivan)
5. "Get Down" (ゲット・ダウン, Getto Daun) (Vocals: Gilbert O'Sullivan)
6. "Love Ya" (好きさ, Suki sa) (Vocals: Anzen Chitai)
7. "Fantasy" (ファンタジー, Fantajī) (Vocals: Picasso)
8. "Sunny Shiny Morning" (サニーシャイニーモーニング) (Vocals: Kiyonori Matsuo)
9. "Goodbye Sketch" (サヨナラの素描, Sayonara no Dessan) (Vocals: Picasso)
10. "Sunny Confession" (陽だまり, Hidamari) (Vocals: Kōzō Murashita)
11. "Begin the Night" (ビギン・ザ・ナイト, Bigin za Naito) (Vocals: Picasso)
12. "Glass Kiss" (硝子のキッス, Garasu no Kissu) (Vocals: Rika Himenogi)
13. "Premonition" (予感, Yokan) (Vocals: Sumi Shimamoto)
14. "Toward the Entrance to Dreams" (夢の入口へ…, Yume no Iriguchi e...) (Vocals: Sumi Shimamoto)

=== Definitive Theme & Character Songs ===
Definitive 'Maison Ikkoku' Anime Theme Song & Character Song Complete Collection (+Background Collection) 決定盤「めぞん一刻」アニメ主題歌&キャラソン大全集(+BGM集)

Soundtrack album
- Released: 19 August 2015
- Language: Japanese
- Label: Pony Canyon

Definitive 'Maison Ikkoku' Anime Theme Song & Character Song Complete Collection (+Background Collection) (決定盤「めぞん一刻」アニメ主題歌&キャラソン大全集(+BGM集), Ketteiban Mezon Ikkoku Anime Shudaika & Kyarason Daizenshū (Purasu BGM-shū)) was released on CD by Pony Canyon on 19 August 2015. It featured two discs with a total of 63 tracks of theme songs, in-character songs, and background music from the anime TV series and film. Vocal artists included on the album included Anzen Chitai, Rika Himenogi, Takao Kisugi, Kiyonori Matsuo, Kōzō Murashita, Gilbert O'Sullivan, Picasso, Yuki Saito, and Sumi Shimamoto.

Track listing (disc 1)

1. "Hello Sadness" (悲しみよこんにちは, Kanashimi yo Konnichi wa) (Vocals: Yuki Saito)
2. "Will Tomorrow Be Sunny?" (あした晴れるか, Ashita Hareru ka) (Vocals: Takao Kisugi)
3. "Ci-ne-ma" (シ・ネ・マ, Shi-ne-ma) (Vocals: Picasso)
4. "Alone Again (Naturally)" (アローン・アゲイン, Arōn Agein) (Vocals: Gilbert O'Sullivan)
5. "Get Down" (ゲット・ダウン, Getto Daun) (Vocals: Gilbert O'Sullivan)
6. "Love Ya" (好きさ, Suki sa) (Vocals: Anzen Chitai)
7. "Fantasy" (ファンタジー, Fantajī) (Vocals: Picasso)
8. "Sunny Shiny Morning" (サニーシャイニーモーニング) (Vocals: Kiyonori Matsuo)
9. "Goodbye Sketch" (サヨナラの素描, Sayonara no Dessan) (Vocals: Picasso)
10. "Sunny Confession" (陽だまり, Hidamari) (Vocals: Kōzō Murashita)
11. "Begin the Night" (ビギン・ザ・ナイト, Bigin za Naito) (Vocals: Picasso)
12. "Glass Kiss" (硝子のキッス, Garasu no Kissu) (Vocals: Rika Himenogi)
13. "Hello Sadness" (悲しみよこんにちは, Kanashimi yo Konnichi wa) (Vocals: Sumi Shimamoto singing as Kyoko Otonashi)
14. "Melody" (メロディー, Merodī) (Vocals: Sumi Shimamoto singing as Kyoko Otonashi)
15. "Premonition" (予感, Yokan) (Vocals: Sumi Shimamoto singing as Kyoko Otonashi)
16. "Follow You" (フォロー・ユー, Forō Yū) (Vocals: Sumi Shimamoto singing as Kyoko Otonashi)
17. "Toward the Entrance to Dreams" (夢の入口へ…, Yume no Iriguchi e...) (Vocals: Sumi Shimamoto singing as Kyoko Otonashi)
18. "Excited Heart" (ときめき, Tokimeki) (Vocals: Sumi Shimamoto singing as Kyoko Otonashi)
19. "Sunny Shiny Morning" (サニーシャイニーモーニング) (Vocals: Sumi Shimamoto singing as Kyoko Otonashi)
20. "Endless" (エンドレス, Endoresu) (Vocals: Sumi Shimamoto singing as Kyoko Otonashi)

Track listing (disc 2)

1. "Bridge #5" (ブリッジその5, Burijji Sono 5)
2. "Spring" (春, Haru)
3. "Twilight" (夕暮, Yūgure)
4. "Drunken Steps" (千鳥足, Chidori Ashi)
5. "Summer Clouds" (夏の雲, Natsu no Kumo)
6. "Winter" (冬, Fuyu)
7. "Sadness" (悲しみ, Kanashimi)
8. "Sheltering from the Rain" (雨やどり, Amayadori)
9. "An Evening Alone" (ひとりの夜, Hitori no Yoru)
10. "Bridge #11" (ブリッジその11, Burijji Sono 11)
11. "Within a Dream" (夢の中, Yume no Naka)
12. "Autumn" (秋, Aki)
13. "Strange Company" (不思議なお客, Fushigi na Okyaku)
14. "After the Rain" (雨あがり, Ame Agari)
15. "Ominous Sign" (不気味な気配, Bukimi na Kehai)
16. "The Way Home" (帰り道, Kaeri Michi)
17. "Doubletime" (かけ足, Kakeashi)
18. "Evening Rain" (夜の雨, Yoru no Ame)
19. "Rainbow" (虹, Niji)
20. "Midnight Visitor" (真夜中の訪問者, Mayonaka no Hōmonsha)
21. "Unsatisfied Desire" (もの想い, Mono Omoi)
22. "A Bell Tolls at Dawn" (暁に鐘は鳴る, Akatsuki ni Kane wa Naru)
23. "Mr. Sōichirō!!" (惣一郎さんっ!!, Sōichirō-san!!)
24. "Lunchbox and Broom" (お弁当とホウキ, Obentō to Hōki)
25. "Akemi's Toothbrush" (朱美のハブラシ, Akemi no Haburashi)
26. "Sunny Confession" (陽だまりの告白, Hidamari no Kokuhaku)
27. "Mrs. Ichinose Is Going Today, Too" (一の瀬さんは今日も行く, Ichinose-san wa Kyō mo Iku)
28. "Tennis Balls and Gossip" (テニスボールと噂話, Tenisu Bōru to Uwasabanashi)
29. "Incident" (事件, Jiken)
30. "First Evening Star Halfway up the Hill" (坂の途中の一番星, Saka no Tochū no Ichibanboshi)
31. "Mitaka Godai!!" (三鷹・五代!!)
32. "Desire" (願い, Negai)
33. "Kissing Scene" (キッスのある情景, Kissu no Aru Jōkei)
34. "Plum Brandy Granny" (梅酒婆あ, Umeshu Babaa)
35. "My Path's Mutt" (行きがけの駄犬, Ikigake no Daken)
36. "Wimp" (弱虫, Yowamushi)
37. "Non-returning Boyfriend" (帰らざる彼, Kaerazaru Kare)
38. "Dream Night" (夢一夜, Yume Ichiya)
39. "Yotsuya's Motives" (四谷の思惑, Yotsuya no Omowaku)
40. "Party Refusal" (宴会謝絶, Enkai Shasetsu)
41. "Complicated Evening" (複雑夜, Fukuzatsuya)
42. "Miss Kyoko...!!" (響子さん…!!, Kyōko-san...!!)
43. "Love, Before Daybreak" (愛・夜明け前, Ai, Yoakemae)

== Drama albums ==
Drama albums contain the audio track of TV episodes, films, and radio dramas.

=== Perfect Recording ===
Maison Ikkoku Final Perfect Recording Edition めぞん一刻 完結篇 完全収録版

Soundtrack album
- Released: 21 March 1988
- Genres: Drama, romance
- Language: Japanese
- Label: Kitty Records

Maison Ikkoku Final Perfect Recording Edition (めぞん一刻 完結篇 完全収録版, Mezon Ikkoku Kanzenban Kanzen Shūrokuban) was released on 21 March 1988 by Pony Canyon on LP and cassette, and on CD by Kitty Records. It featured 16 tracks of audio drama and theme songs. The music was composed by Hideharu Mori (of Picasso. The vocal artist for the theme song was Rika Himenogi.

Track listing

1. "Cheers!!" (乾杯!!, Kanpai!!)
2. "Crystal Heart"
3. "Wedding Dress"
4. "Widow's Lover"
5. "American Woman"
6. "She-Inn"
7. "A Breath of Air"
8. "The Moon and the Guitar" (月とギター, Tsuki to Gitā)
9. "The Merry-go-round Couple" (メリーゴーラウンドのふたり, Merīgōraundo no Futari)
10. "Confetti" (紙吹雪, Kamifubuki)
11. "I Need Her"
12. "6•6•6"
13. "In the Moonlight"
14. "I Love You"
15. "In the Moonlight"
16. "Glass Kiss" (硝子のキッス, Garasu no Kissu) (Vocals: Rika Himenogi)

=== Sound Theater ===
There were 48 volumes in the original Maison Ikkoku Sound Theater (めぞん一刻サウンド・シアター, Mezon Ikkoku Saundo Shiatā) CD series, released by Kitty Records from 25 May 1990 to 25 July 1991. These contain the audio from the 96 anime television series episodes, similar to a radio drama, as well as guest segments with various celebrities.

Maison Ikkoku Special Sound Theater Extra Version (めぞん一刻スペシャル サウンド・シアター エクストラバージョン, Mezon Ikkoku Saundo Shiatā) was released as a CD by Kitty Records on 25 June 1991. It contained audio from the Side Story: Ikkoku Island Flirtation Story and Prelude, When the Cherry Blossoms Return in the Spring OVAs.

Volume	Episodes	Released	Catalog #	Runtime	Guests	Notes
1	1–2	25 May 1990	KTCD-3001	71:22	Kazuyo Aoki, Sumi Shimamoto	
2	3–4	25 May 1990	KTCD-3002	68:32	Yūko Mita, Sumi Shimamoto	
3	5–6	25 May 1990	KTCD-3003	72:15	Hisako Kyōda, Akira Kamiya	
4	7–8	25 May 1990	KTCD-3004	73:43	Akira Kamiya, Sumi Shimamoto	
5	9–10	25 May 1990	KTCD-3005	72:14	Chika Sakamoto, Sumi Shimamoto	
6	11–12	25 May 1990	KTCD-3006	73:25	Yūko Mita, Sumi Shimamoto	
7	13–14	25 July 1990	KTCD-3007	71:35	Saeko Shimazu, Sumi Shimamoto	
8	15–16	25 July 1990	KTCD-3008	74:16	Issei Futamata, Sumi Shimamoto	
9	17–18	25 July 1990	KTCD-3009	70:48	Toshio Furukawa, Tetsuya Tsujihata	
10	19–20	25 July 1990	KTCD-3010	74:39	Minori Matsushima, Issei Futamata, Sumi Shimamoto	
11	21–22	25 July 1990	KTCD-3011	70:30	Sumi Shimamoto, Toshio Furukawa	
12	23–24	25 July 1990	KTCD-3012	74:08	Hiroshi Ōtake, Issei Futamata	
13	25–26	25 September 1990	KTCD-3013	74:43	Miina Tominaga, Ryūji Saikachi	
14	27–28	25 September 1990	KTCD-3014	72:51	Minoru Yada, Sumi Shimamoto	
15	29–30	25 September 1990	KTCD-3015	72:42	Hiroshi Masuoka, Sumi Shimamoto	
16	31–32	25 September 1990	KTCD-3016	69:15	Yoshiko Sakakibara, Tetsuya Tsujihata	
17	33–34	25 September 1990	KTCD-3017	70:23	Ryūji Saikachi, Sumi Shimamoto	
18	35–36	25 September 1990	KTCD-3018	67:57	Sumi Shimamoto, Miina Tominaga	
19	37–38	25 November 1990	KTCD-3019	72:07	Rokurō Naya, Kōsei Tomita, Sumi Shimamoto	
20	39–40	25 November 1990	KTCD-3020	70:01	Norio Wakamoto, Sumi Shimamoto	
21	41–42	25 November 1990	KTCD-3021	68:07	Sumi Shimaoto, Akiko Tsuboi	
22	43–44	25 November 1990	KTCD-3022	73:02	Atsuko Mine, Sumi Shimamoto	
23	45–46	25 November 1990	KTCD-3023	74:58	Akiko Tsuboi, Norio Wakamoto	
24	47–48	25 November 1990	KTCD-3024	73:52	Kōsei Tomita, Rokurō Naya, Sumi Shimamoto	
25	49–50	25 January 1991	KTCD-3025	71:31	Katsunosuke Hori, Sumi Shimamoto	
26	51–52	25 January 1991	KTCD-3026	69:10	Sukekiyo Kameyama, Hiromi Tsuru	
27	53–54	25 January 1991	KTCD-3027	69:53	Mugihito, Sumi Shimamoto	
28	55–56	25 January 1991	KTCD-3028	73:08	Gara Takashima	
29	57–58	25 January 1991	KTCD-3029	73:42	Hiromi Tsuru, Sukekiyo Kameyama, Sumi Shimamoto	
30	59–60	25 January 1991	KTCD-3030	73:01	Sumi Shimamoto, Katsunosuke Hori	
31	61–62	25 March 1991	KTCD-3031	71:46	Asami Mukaidono, Sumi Shimamoto	
32	63–64	25 March 1991	KTCD-3032	70:38	Yuriko Fuchizaki, Sumi Shimamoto	
33	65–66	25 March 1991	KTCD-3033	68:27	Toshiko Sawada, Hiromi Tsuru	
34	67–68	25 March 1991	KTCD-3034	72:15	Sanae Miyuki, Yuriko Fuchizaki	
35	69–70	25 March 1991	KTCD-3035	75:13	Sumi Shimamoto, Shingo Kanemoto	
36	71–72	25 March 1991	KTCD-3036	70:57	Shingo Kanemoto, Sanae Miyuki	
37	73–74	25 May 1991	KTCD-3037	70:18	Tarako, Kazue Komiya	
38	75–76	25 May 1991	KTCD-3038	68:49	Naoki Tatsuta, Tarako	
39	77–78	25 May 1991	KTCD-3039	72:28	Masako Katsuki, Sumi Shimamoto	
40	79–80	25 May 1991	KTCD-3040	71:59	Kei Tomiyama, Tarako	
41	81–82	25 May 1991	KTCD-3041	70:52	Kazue Komiya, Kei Tomiyama	
42	83–84	25 May 1991	KTCD-3042	73:21	Sumi Shimamoto, Masako Katsuki	
43	85–86	25 July 1991	KTCD-3043	66:32	Tomohiro Nishimura, Tarako	
44	87–88	25 July 1991	KTCD-3044	69:39	Megumi Hayashibara, Hideyuki Tanaka	
45	89–90	25 July 1991	KTCD-3045	76:10	Tomohiro Nishimura, Sumi Shimamoto	
46	91–92	25 July 1991	KTCD-3046	75:00	Yoshiko Asai, Sumi Shimamoto	
47	93–94	25 July 1991	KTCD-3047	73:53	Hideyuki Tanaka, Tomohiro Nishimura	
48	95–96	25 July 1991	KTCD-3048	72:10	Megumi Hayashibara, Sumi Shimamoto	
Special	OVAs	25 June 1991	KTCR-1165	72:10	n/a	

== Music calendars ==
Five music calendars were released between 1989 and 1993. All of them included a calendar, and three included a cassette or CD with a collection of instrumental or arranged music from the series. The 1991 release included original background music and an original story with Sumi Shimamoto (Kyoko) narrating. The 1994 music calendar was released only on VHS and included a digest version of the anime TV series and a segment about Yotsuya's secrets.

=== Music Calendar 1990 ===
Maison Ikkoku Music Calendar 1990 めぞん一刻 ミュージックカレンダー1990

Recording
- Released: November 1989
- Language: Japanese
- Label: Kitty Records

Maison Ikkoku Music Calendar 1990 (めぞん一刻 ミュージックカレンダー1990, Mezon Ikkoku Myūjikku Karendā 1990) was released on cassette by Kitty Records in November 1989. It featured 12 tracks of instrumental and arranged versions of theme songs, with some narration by Sumi Shimamoto.

Track listing

1. "Hello Sadness" (悲しみよこんにちは, Kanashimi yo Konnichi wa)
2. "Will Tomorrow Be Sunny?" (あした晴れるか, Ashita Hareru ka)
3. "Ci-ne-ma" (シ・ネ・マ, Shi-me-ma)
4. "Alone Again (Naturally)" (アローン・アゲイン, Arōn Agein)
5. "Get Down" (ゲット・ダウン, Getto Daun)
6. "Premonition" (予感, Yokan)
7. "Fantasy" (ファンタジー, Fantajī)
8. "Love Ya" (好きさ, Suki sa)
9. "Sunny Shiny Morning" (サニーシャイニーモーニング)
10. "Goodbye Sketch" (サヨナラの素描, Sayonara no Dessan)
11. "Sunny Confession" (陽だまり, Hidamari)
12. "Begin the Night" (ビギン・ザ・ナイト, Bigin za Naito)

=== Music Calendar 1991 ===
Maison Ikkoku Music Calendar 1991 めぞん一刻 ミュージックカレンダー1991

Recording
- Language: Japanese
- Label: Kitty Records

Maison Ikkoku Music Calendar 1991 (めぞん一刻 ミュージックカレンダー1991, Mezon Ikkoku Myūjikku Karendā 1991) was released on CD by Kitty Records in November 1990. It featured an original Maison Ikkoku story narrated by Sumi Shimamoto, and it used original background music.

=== Music Calendar 1992 ===
Maison Ikkoku Music Calendar 1992 めぞん一刻 ミュージックカレンダー1992

Recording
- Released: 25 December 1991
- Language: Japanese
- Label: Kitty Records

Maison Ikkoku Music Calendar 1992 (めぞん一刻 ミュージックカレンダー1992, Mezon Ikkoku Myūjikku Karendā 1992) was released on CD by Kitty Records on 25 December 1991. It featured 12 tracks of instrumental and arranged versions of theme songs.

Track listing

1. "Hello Sadness" (悲しみよこんにちは, Kanashimi yo Konnichi wa)
2. "Will Tomorrow Be Sunny?" (あした晴れるか, Ashita Hareru ka)
3. "Ci-ne-ma" (シ・ネ・マ, Shi-me-ma)
4. "Alone Again (Naturally)" (アローン・アゲイン, Arōn Agein)
5. "Get Down" (ゲット・ダウン, Getto Daun)
6. "Premonition" (予感, Yokan)
7. "Fantasy" (ファンタジー, Fantajī)
8. "Love Ya" (好きさ, Suki sa)
9. "Sunny Shiny Morning" (サニーシャイニーモーニング)
10. "Goodbye Sketch" (サヨナラの素描, Sayonara no Dessan)
11. "Sunny Confession" (陽だまり, Hidamari)
12. "Begin the Night" (ビギン・ザ・ナイト, Bigin za Naito)

=== Music Calendar 1993 ===
Maison Ikkoku Music Calendar 1993 めぞん一刻 ミュージックカレンダー1993

Recording
- Released: 21 December 1992
- Language: Japanese
- Label: Kitty Records

Maison Ikkoku Music Calendar 1993 (めぞん一刻 ミュージックカレンダー1993, Mezon Ikkoku Myūjikku Karendā 1993) was released on CD by Kitty Records on 21 December 1992. It featured 5 tracks of theme music arranged in a music box style.

Track listing

1. "Hello Sadness" (悲しみよこんにちは, Kanashimi yo Konnichi wa)
2. "Will Tomorrow Be Sunny?" (あした晴れるか, Ashita Hareru ka)
3. "Ci-ne-ma" (シ・ネ・マ, Shi-me-ma)
4. "Sunny Shiny Morning" (サニーシャイニーモーニング)
5. "Begin the Night" (ビギン・ザ・ナイト, Bigin za Naito)

=== Music Calendar 1994 ===
Maison Ikkoku Music Calendar 1994 めぞん一刻 ミュージックカレンダー1994

Video
- Released: December 1993
- Language: Japanese
- Label: Kitty Records

Maison Ikkoku Music Calendar 1994 (めぞん一刻 ミュージックカレンダー1994, Mezon Ikkoku Myūjikku Karendā 1994) was released on VHS by Kitty Records in December 1993. It featured a short segment delving into Yotsuya's secrets, as well as a digest version of the anime television series. The video is narrated by Shigeru Chiba.

== Other ==
There were two large collections, one collecting all of the songs released as CD singles, and one collecting all music used in the Maison Ikkoku TV series, the theatrical film, and all of the songs sung by voice actors while in character. They are listed in chronological release order.

- The Maison Ikkoku CD Single Memorial File was released on 11 July 1988 by Kitty Records. It includes thirteen 8 cm CD singles containing two songs each, a 12 cm CD adapter, and a booklet containing all of the lyrics for the included songs. It was also released on two cassette tapes in December 1989.
- On 1 November 1994, Kitty Records released the Maison Ikkoku Complete Music Box (めぞん一刻 コンプリート・ミュージック・ボックス, Mezon Ikkoku Konpurīto Myūjikku Bokkusu). It includes eight CDs containing all the theme songs used during the TV series and in the theatrical film, as well as all of the incidental music used throughout the series (background music by Takao Sugiyama (eps 1–26, 38–96) and Kenji Kawai (eps 27–96), eyecatches, and insert songs), music from the theatrical film, and a reissue of Koisuru Ki-Mo-Chi.

=== Forever Remix ===
Maison Ikkoku Forever Remix めぞん一刻 フォーエバー・リミックス

Remix album by Takao Kisugi, Kiyonori Matsuo, Picasso, and Sumi Shimamoto
- Released: 25 July 1991
- Length: 46:41
- Language: Japanese
- Label: Kitty Records

Maison Ikkoku Forever Remix (めぞん一刻 フォーエバー・リミックス, Mezon Ikkoku Fōebā Rimikkusu) was released on CD by Kitty Records on 25 July 1991. It featured 10 tracks of remixed theme and character songs. Vocal artists included on the album included Takao Kisugi, Kiyonori Matsuo, Picasso, and Sumi Shimamoto.

Track listing

1. "Cinema '92" (シネマ '92, Shinema '92) (Carmen Mix, vocals: Picasso)
2. "Sunny Shiny Morning" (サニー・シャイニー・モーニング, Sanī Shainī Mōningu) (Cee-light Mix, vocals: Kiyonori Matsuo)
3. "Wet-Eyed Picture" (濡れた瞳のピクチャー, Nureta Hitomi no Pikuchaa) (Hook of Dub Mix, vocals: Picasso)
4. "Fantasy" (ファンタジー, Fantajī) (Jam-Slam-ica Mix, vocals: Picasso)
5. "Begin the Night" (ビギン・ザ・ナイト, Bigin za Naito) (Neanderthal Mix, vocals: Picasso)
6. "Will Tomorrow Be Sunny?" (あした晴れるか, Ashita Hareru ka) (Jet Jet Jet Mix, vocals: Takao Kisugi)
7. "Goodbye Sketch" (サヨナラの素描, Sayonara no Sobyō) (Cro-Magnon Mix, vocals: Picasso)
8. "Cinema '90" (シネマ '90, Shinema '90) (Original Mix, vocals: Picasso)
9. "Endless" (エンドレス, Endoresu) (Eternallove Mix, vocals: Sumi Shimamoto as by Kyoko Otonashi)
10. "Hello Sadness" (悲しみよこんにちは, Kanashimi yo Konnichi wa) (Rough Mix, vocals: Sumi Shimamoto as by Kyoko Otonashi)

=== Original Dramatic Sound Track ===
Maison Ikkoku Original Dramatic Sound Track めぞん一刻 Original Dramatic Sound Track

Soundtrack album
- Released: 12 June 2012
- Language: Japanese
- Label: Heiwa

Maison Ikkoku Original Dramatic Sound Track (めぞん一刻 Original Dramatic Sound Track, Mezon Ikkoku Orijinaru Doramachikku Saundotorakku) is a pachinko/pachislot game soundtrack released on CD by Heiwa on 12 June 2012. It featured 10 tracks of music from games released by Heiwa and their subsidiary, Olympia. The album was only available from the Heiwa website for a limited time.

Track listing

1. "Summer-Colored Sparkles" (夏色キラキラ, Natsuiro Kira Kira)
2. "Thank You: The Place of Overflowing Smiles" (ありがとう～笑顔溢れる場所～, Arigatō: Egao Afureru Basho) (Vocals: Ichiko)
3. "I'm Making Myself Happy" (幸せにします, Shiawase ni Shimasu)
4. "Romantic Way" (恋の行方, Koi no Ikikata) (Vocals: Ichiko)
5. "Non Stop = Lucky Days" (Vocals: Ichiko)
6. "If I Invite Eternity" (永遠と呼べるなら, Eien to Yoberunara) (Vocals: Ichiko)
7. "My Days" (Vocals: Ichiko)
8. "Seasons" (Vocals: Ichiko)
9. "Toward the Door" (扉の向こうへ, Tobira no Mukō e)
10. "Umbrella" (アンブレラ, Anburera) (Vocals: Ichiko)

=== I'm So Glad I Met You OST ===
Dramatic Pachislot Maison Ikkoku: I'm So Glad I Met You Soundtrack ドラマチック・パチスロ めぞん一刻 ~あなたに会えて、本当によかった～サウンドトラック

Soundtrack album
- Released: 2010
- Language: Japanese
- Label: Olympia

Dramatic Pachislot Maison Ikkoku: I'm So Glad I Met You Soundtrack (ドラマチック・パチスロ めぞん一刻 ~あなたに会えて、本当によかった～サウンドトラック, Doramachikku Pachisuro Mezon Ikkoku: Anata ni Aete, Honto ni Yokatta Saundotorakku) was released on CD by Olympia (a subsidiary of Heiwa) in 2010. It featured four tracks of music from the pachislot game.

Track listing

1. "Non Stop = Lucky Days" (Vocals: Ichiko)
2. "My Days" (Vocals: Ichiko)
3. "Seasons" (Vocals: Ichiko)
4. "If I Invite Eternity" (永遠と呼べるなら, Eien to Yoberunara) (Vocals: Ichiko)
