= Maison Ikkoku CD Single Memorial File =

Maison Ikkoku CD Single Memorial File めぞん一刻CDシングルメモリアル・ファイル

Box set by Various artists
- Released: 1988-07-11
- Genre: Anime soundtrack
- Length: 101:09
- Label: Kitty Records
- Producer: Takeo Matsushima

Professional ratings
Review scores
Source	Rating
EX.com	(favorable)

The Maison Ikkoku CD Single Memorial File (めぞん一刻CDシングルメモリアル・ファイル, Mezon Ikkoku Shīdī Shinguru Memoriaru Fairu) is a compilation CD box set released on 11 July 1988 featuring all of the opening and ending theme songs from the anime television series Maison Ikkoku, and the theme song from the Maison Ikkoku theatrical movie. This box set is one of only three Maison Ikkoku music collections containing the theme song Hidamari by Kōzō Murashita, so this set is considered more collectable as a result.

== Description ==
The Maison Ikkoku CD Single Memorial File is contained in a large LP-sized hard slipcase with two pull-out hardcover folders. The first contains nine of the 8 cm CD singles, and the second contains four CD singles along with an adapter for playing the 8 cm CDs in CD players which can only handle the standard 12 cm CDs (such as slot-drives for which the 8 cm CD single format is too small).

The inside of each folder features "film strip"-style summaries of the opening and ending credits used throughout the anime series. The outside cover of each folder features full color group scenes of the characters from the series.

The insert shows the covers of all the CD singles represented in this collection, as well as the complete lyrics for each song. A track listing is included on the back of the insert, listing the title, artist, date of release, record label, which episodes used the song, and the date range of those episodes.

== Track listing ==
Disc	Track	English title	Japanese title	Rōmaji title	Artist	Track time
1	1	Hello Sadness!	悲しみよこんにちは	Kanashimi yo Konnichi wa	Yuki Saito	4:00
1	2	Forgotten Things When Moving	お引越し・忘れもの	Ohikkoshi Wasuremono	Yuki Saito	4:44
2	3	Will Tomorrow Be Sunny?	あした晴れるか	Ashita Hareru ka	Takao Kisugi	4:35
2	4	Just a Little Farther	もう少し遠く	Mō Sukoshi Tōku	Takao Kisugi	4:10
3	5	Cinema	シ・ネ・マ	Shinema	Picasso	3:56
3	6	BGM: On the Way Home 2	BGM-帰り道2	Bijiemu Kaerimichi Tsū	Instrumental	3:26
4	7	Alone Again	アローン・アゲイン	Arōn Agein	Gilbert O'Sullivan	3:40
4	8	Get Down	ゲット・ダウン	Getto Daun	Gilbert O'Sullivan	2:38
5	9	Premonition	予感	Yokan	Kyoko Otonashi	3:53
5	10	Toward the Entrance to a Dream	夢の入口へ...	Yume no Iriguchi e...	Kyoko Otonashi	4:03
6	11	Fantasy	ファンタジー	Fantajī	Picasso	4:03
6	12	Picture of Teary Eyes	濡れた瞳のピクチャー	Nureta Hitomi no Pikuchā	Picasso	3:36
7	13	I Love You	好きさ	Suki sa	Anzen Chitai	2:49
7	14	Enveloped in Memories	思い出につつまれて	Omoide ni Tsutsumarete	Anzen Chitai	2:40
8	15	Sunny Shiny Morning	サニー シャイニー モーニング	Sanī Shainī Mōningu	Kiyonori Matsuo	3:48
8	16	Younger Girl	ヤンガーガール	Yangā Gāru	Kiyonori Matsuo	3:15
9	17	Goodbye Sketch	サヨナラの素描	Sayonara no Dessan	Picasso	4:34
9	18	Sand Atelier	砂のATELIER	Suna no Atorie	Picasso	3:57
10	19	Melody	メロディー	Merodī	Kyoko Otonashi	3:51
10	20	Excitement	ときめき	Tokimeki	Kyoko Otonashi	3:59
11	21	Sunny Spot	陽だまり	Hidamari	Kōzō Murashita	4:05
11	22	Symphony of Wind	BGM: 風のシンフォニー	Bijiemu: Kaze no Shinfonī	Instrumental	4:08
12	23	Begin the Night	ビギン・ザ・ナイト	Bigin za Naito	Picasso	4:32
12	24	The Tenderness Burns	愛しさが、燃える。	Itoshisa ga, Moeru.	Picasso	4:33
13	25	Glass Kiss	硝子のキッス	Garasu no Kissu	Rika Himenogi	4:28
13	26	Needles of Tears and Threads of Wind	涙の針と風の糸	Namida no Hari to Kaze no Ito	Rika Himenogi	3:46
