= List of Heaven's Lost Property episodes =

The first DVD volume of Sora no Otoshimono released by Kadokawa Pictures on December 25, 2009

Heaven's Lost Property is an anime series adapted from the manga of the same name by Suu Minazuki. The story revolves around Tomoki Sakurai, a young man struggling for a life of peace and quiet when he encounters Ikaros, an Angeloid who fell from the sky, and other Angeloids as the series progresses.

Produced by Anime International Company and directed by Hisashi Saito, the anime was broadcast on TV Saitama and Chiba TV from October 4 to December 27, 2009, with subsequent broadcasts on KBS Kyoto, TV Kanagawa, Sun Television, TVQ, Tokyo MX and TV Aichi. English-subtitled simulcasts were provided by Crunchyroll on their video portal. Seven DVD compilation volumes were released between December 25, 2009, and June 25, 2010, by Kadokawa Pictures, with limited edition volumes also sold. A Blu-ray box set was released on June 24, 2011. The anime is licensed in North America by Funimation as Heaven's Lost Property: Sora no Otoshimono, and released the first season on December 20, 2011. Heaven's Lost Property covers events up to the Nymph/Harpies storyline of the manga, with most of the stories resequenced to fit the themes of the episodes, for instance, the visit to Mikako Satsukitane's place is coupled with the island vacation trip. Both Mikako and Nymph are introduced earlier in the series so they participate in more of the events.

An OVA episode entitled "Project Pink" was bundled with the Limited Edition release of volume 9 of the manga on DVD on September 9, 2010. The episode was considered "too dangerous" for TV and was originally planned to be on the seventh DVD volume, but was later removed and replaced with a TV version of the final episode and live footage of the SoraOto live concert which took place on March 20, 2010.

A second season, titled Heaven's Lost Property: Forte (そらのおとしもの f （フォルテ）, Sora no Otoshimono: Forte), was announced on reprinted copies of the manga. Also produced by A.I.C., the anime aired 12 episodes on TV Saitama and Chiba TV from October 1 to December 17, 2010, with simulcasts provided by Crunchyroll as with the first season. Six DVD volumes were released by Kadokawa Pictures between December 24, 2010, and May 27, 2011. The second season is licensed by Funimation under the title Heaven's Lost Property: Sora no Otoshimono Forte, and has streamed simulcasts on their video portal. Forte resumes where the previous season has left off, covering events from the Astraea arc to the Chaos arc of the manga while leaving the Hiyori arc to be featured in the follow-up film Heaven's Lost Property the Movie: The Angeloid of Clockwork. As with the first season, many of the manga's events are resequenced to fit the themes of the episodes.

The opening theme for the first season is "Ring My Bell" by Blue Drops, consisting of singers Hitomi Yoshida and Ikaros (Saori Hayami), while multiple ending themes were used for each episode aired. For the second season, the opening theme for episode 1 is a cover of "Ring My Bell" sung by Soichiro Hoshi, (Note: The Tomoki version has him flying around like an angel but instead of images of the main cast, there are images of girls from his magazines.) while the opening theme from episode 2 onwards is "Heart no Kakuritsu" (ハートの確率, Hāto no Kakuritsu; "Probabilities of the Heart") by Blue Drops. As with the first season, each episode features a different ending song.

== Episode list ==
=== Heaven's Lost Property (2009) ===
No. overall (Note: Numbering is per Funimation listing. The OVA "Project Pink" is counted as episode 14, and the first episode of the second season is counted as episode 15)	Title	Ending theme	Original release date
1	"A Full-frontal Hero Arises in the World!"; Transliteration: "Yūsha Sekai ni Tatsu!" (Japanese: 全裸王（ユウシャ）世界に起つ!)	"Soba ni Irareru Dake de" (そばにいられるだけで; "Just to be Near") by Blue Drops	October 4, 2009
Tomoki Sakurai wants to enjoy "peace and quiet", but he has recurring dreams that involve an angel. When classmate Eishiro Sugata spots in the sky an abnormal structure that resembles a black hole, he convinces Tomoki, childhood neighbor Sohara Mitsuki, and student council president Mikako Satsukitane to join him for an investigation at a cherry blossom. Tomoki, being the only who shows up, witnesses a girl with wings falls through the hole, along with several large pillars, scaring him to death. He overcomes his fears and rescues this girl, who calls herself Ikaros. Calling herself a Pet-Class Angeloid from an unknown world called Synapse, she considers Tomoki as her master and tells him that she can grant him any wish. Using this to his advantage including a perverted scene, he gets carried away with what he would wish for. When Tomoki jokingly commands Ikaros to make him ruler of the world, this only causes everyone to vanish, since nobody would accept him as such. Ikaros suggests killing herself, seeing how upset Tomoki is, to which he affirms. As she creates a gun and readies to shoot herself, Tomoki stops her and says it was only a joke. Although he cannot undo the wish, he is able to make a different one, wishing that this was all a bad dream. Tomoki wakes up and everything is back to normal, except Ikaros is here to stay.
2	"An Airborne Prismatic Panty Adventure"; Transliteration: "Amakakeru Roman" (Japanese: 天翔ける虹色下着（ロマン）)	"Misaki Meguri" (岬めぐり; "Cape Tour") (Note: "Misaki Meguri" was originally performed by Kotaro Yamamoto and Weekend in 1974.) by Mina	October 11, 2009
After introducing her to Sugata and Mikako at school, Tomoki dismisses Ikaros to his home, but she leaves him with a special card. After Sohara trips and falls in class, Tomoki notices she is wearing panties with a dog print, but he subconsciously wishes she would change them. Later Tomoki handcuffs Sohara to force her to grant his wishes. But the card activates, and Sohara's panties immediately come off and fly to the sky like a bird. Sohara rushes to the New World Discovery Club room, but whatever she puts on is also sent flying. When Ikaros returns, Tomoki wishes for panties, but this results in having them instantly pulled from all the school girls. Sugata determines that Tomoki must be expecting a particular pair, so Ikaros and Mikako shop for a large selection of panties while the boys escort the young girl handcuffed home, during which Tomoki shields against any accidental exposure. Sohara tries the panties, but they are all sent flying, except for one that is a similar dog print as her original, releasing Sohara from the handcuffs. Tomoki recalls when Sohara was practicing breaking slabs and he pulled her pants down revealing a cute print of puppies, which fueled Sohara into breaking the slabs easily.
3	"Angeloid Directive Zero"; Transliteration: "Enjeroido Zero Shirei" (Japanese: エンジェロイド初体験（0シレイ）)	"Taiyō ga Kureta Kisetsu" (太陽がくれた季節; "The Season that Gave the Sun") (Note: "Taiyou ga Kureta Kisetsu" was originally done by a group called Aoi Sankaku Jougi (青い三角定規, Aoi Sankaku Jōgi; lit. "Blue Triangle Ruler") in 1972 and was featured in the high school drama Tobidase Seishun (飛び出せ青春; lit. Fly Out, Youth) - Kurihara, Juju (2012-07-01). "Why anime Sora No Otoshimono makes me nostalgic". IroMegane.com.) by Saori Hayami, Mina, Ayahi Takagaki, Soichiro Hoshi and Tatsuhisa Suzuki	October 18, 2009
Frustrated with their math homework, Tomoki and Sohara look for Sugata, running around town until Mikako directs them to his residence which is an outdoor campsite. After Sugata helps them, he informs them that the black hole may still be hovering in the sky, but Ikaros sees no sign of this. Later, Ikaros is given a shopping list of curry ingredients, and Tomoki tells Ikaros to behave like a normal human. As Ikaros goes shopping, Tomoki and friends tail her. She gets the ingredients except for meat, for which she buys a cute baby chick, leaving them with cooking vegetable curry. The gang goes fishing, but Ikaros surprises everyone with a giant fish from the Amazon River. Sugata questions her superior physical abilities and flying speed, yet contradictory lack of math ability and not being able to see the "New World" in the sky. Sugata confronts her asking what she is exactly, but Ikaros does not know and just wants to please her master even though she messes things up.
4	"Love and Triangles, Revisited"; Transliteration: "Ai to Toraianguru Futatabi" (Japanese: 愛と三角地帯（トライアングル）ふたたび)	"Senshi no Kyusoku" (戦士の休息; "A Warrior’s Rest") (Note: "Senshi no Kyusoku" was originally performed by Yoshito Machida in 1978 and was featured in the film Never Give Up) by Soichiro Hoshi	October 25, 2009
The flock of panties returns to Tomoki after circumnavigating the globe, using them as decorations around his house, but an upset Sohara shreds the ones in his room in retaliation. Ikaros allows Sohara to use of her cards to make panties explode whenever Tomoki touches them or even looks at them for a day. With Tomoki trapped in his house, Sohara and Ikaros go shopping. Sohara shares a story of how Tomoki helped celebrate her otherwise lonely birthday. Later, Tomoki makes one last mad dash out of the house, but bumps into Sohara, landing his face on her crotch and causing another explosion. After Tomoki regains consciousness, Sugata and Mikako tell him that Sohara is stuck in his house, prompting him to rescue her, even though anybody else could have saved her, as he will probably be blown up inside. Sohara, without panties on, dodges Tomoki's searching but stumbles into his bedroom, activating a "Panty Robot" that guards his pornographic magazines. Tomoki eventually defeats the robot, destroying his house, and rescuing Sohara to the cheers of the neighbors, until he notices Sohara's thighs and subconsciously "pokes" Sohara, who blushes and karate chops him.
5	"Hot Night With the Big Fish"; Transliteration: "Serebu to Atsui Yoru" (Japanese: 任侠（セレブ）と初夜（アツイヨル）)	"Yuke! Yuke! Kawaguchi Hiroshi" (ゆけ!ゆけ!川口浩; "Go! Go! Hiroshi Kawaguchi") by Tatsuo Kamon	November 1, 2009
Knowing that Tomoki needs a place to stay, Mikako offers him to stay at her home, and they bring along their friends as well. It turns out Mikako's family are influential yakuza. After dinner, Tomoki stumbles into Mikako at an outdoor bath, who casually informs him that his trespassing violates a family law where he must be decapitated. Ikaros stops the executioner with a brief display of her power. The next morning, Tomoki finds they are on a plane to an uninhabited island as an alternative punishment instituted by Mikako. They split up to search for food and items, but Tomoki eats a mushroom and passes out. Tomoki hears yelling and rescues Sohara, but everyone else is gone, so the two spend the next few weeks enjoying island life until a sea monster grabs Sohara. Tomoki attacks the "monster", which is actually Ikaros, covered in shells and seaweed, who has returned with a big tuna. Tomoki asks where Sugata and Mikako are, and Ikaros does a scan and then knocks down a wall panel to a room where Mikako's family and Sugata have been watching them the entire time to their amusement. Later, Tomoki and Ikaros return to find his house restored, thanks to Mikako's father, who likes Ikaros and respects her power.
6	"Swimsuit Surf Brigade, Go!Go!Go!"; Transliteration: "Namigiwa GO!GO!GO!" (Japanese: 水着軍団（ナミギワ）GO!GO!GO!)	"Natsuiro no Nancy" (夏色のナンシー, Natsu-iro no Nanshī; "Summertime Nancy") (Note: "Natsuiro no Nancy" was originally done by Yū Hayami in 1983.) by Iori Nomizu	November 8, 2009
Tomoki finds a second Angeloid known as Beta-Class Nymph in his living room. The New World Discovery Club as well as the two Angeloids all go to the beach. Tomoki promises to go boating with Sohara, but neglects her in order to teach Ikaros how to properly swim. Sohara heads off by herself, thinking back to when Tomoki tried teaching her, but soon finds herself far from shore. Sohara falls overboard trying to retrieve her paddle, but Tomoki, assisted by Nymph, rescues her. Tomoki apologizes and Sohara forgives him, until he neglects her again to review swimming with Ikaros, which earns him karate chops. Later that night, Ikaros tells Tomoki how she does not sleep, and the two go back to the beach. Nymph follows them but is attacked by a group of delinquents. When Tomoki attempts to intervene, Ikaros stops the delinquents using her Angeloid abilities, causing them to flee.
7	"The Brainy, Heart-Pounding Transfer Students"; Transliteration: "Tokimeki no Tenkōsei" (Japanese: 電脳少女（トキメキ）の転校生)	"Furimuku na Kimi wa Utsukushii" (ふり向くな君は美しい; "A Turn Around You is Beautiful") (Note: "Furimuku na Kimi wa Utsukushii" was originally done by a group called The Birds in 1976 for the All Japan High School Soccer Tournament.) by Saori Hayami, Mina, Ayahi Takagaki, Iori Nomizu, Soichiro Hoshi and Tatsuhisa Suzuki	November 15, 2009
Out of boredom and curiosity, Ikaros and Nymph join Tomoki and Sohara's class as transfer students. Sohara relishes the chance to help the Angeloids with school life, but they surpass her in all tasks, leaving her depressed. The Angeloids are quickly hit on by every guy in school and receive piles of love letters in their locker. At science class, Ikaros shows up as a guest teacher, with the subject of flying, while Sugata and Mikako sit in on the fun. Ikaros encourages flying and Tomoki volunteers, using a pair of wings that Sugata has crafted. He flies for a moment before crashing to the ground. As Tomoki recovers, Ikaros and Nymph are reading the love letters, but do not understand them. While no one else is around, Nymph grabs Ikaros's forehead, and checks her protection levels, seeing they are at one hundred percent, which explains her passive doll-like behavior. Nymph then reveals that Ikaros is an extremely powerful Angeloid known as the Alpha-Class Uranus Queen.
8	"For Whom the Shooting Festival is Held"; Transliteration: "Matsuri wa Ta ga Tame ni" (Japanese: 血斗（マツリ）は誰がために)	"Wild Seven" (ワイルドセブン, Wairudo Sebun) (Note: "Wild Seven" was originally performed by the band Nonstop in 1969 and was featured in the Japanese drama series of the same name.) by Soichiro Hoshi and Tatsuhisa Suzuki	November 22, 2009
The gang attends a festival at the Satsukitane shrine, with a cork gun survival contest as a highlight of the event. Tomoki soon finds himself hunted by many of the local townsfolk wanting the ten million yen prize, until Sugata and Mikako snipe them. Sugata then duels Mikako with pistols to a draw, until Ikaros arrives and guns everyone down. Tomoki dismisses Ikaros, who meets up with Nymph, who asks her how it felt to slaughter people like she used to. Ikaros insists she is just a Pet-Class Angeloid, but Nymph disagrees and removes her protection levels. As the awakened Uranus Queen, Ikaros easily overpowers Nymph, but spares her life, telling her to return to the Synapse. Tomoki returns to the shooting range man, who reveals he mixed real bullets with some of the fake ones. Sohara shows up with the real bullets and chases Tomoki to the shrine until Ikaros saves him by taking a head shot. After easily defeating Tomoki and Sohara, the shooting range man wins the contest, splitting the prize money back with Mikako. Later, as Tomoki scolds Ikaros not to risk her life like that, Ikaros begins to cry.
9	"The Delusional Story That Began With a Lie"; Transliteration: "Uso kara Hajimaru Sutōrī" (Japanese: 嘘から始まる妄想劇場（ストーリー）)	"Hatsukoi" (初恋; "First Love") (Note: "Hatsukoi" is a song originally done by Kōzō Murashita in 1983.) by Saori Hayami and Ayahi Takagaki	November 29, 2009
At Synapse, after being scolded by her superiors for failing to bring back Ikaros, Nymph begs for another chance. Tomoki and the gang head to a fair. Tomoki spots an erotic DVD at a booth, but cannot afford it because Ikaros broke some other item. After Tomoki tells Ikaros to act more human, she overhears a couple talk about lying as being human, so she proceeds to tell her friends the opposite of what she means, leaving Tomoki and Sohara depressed. Nymph, first deciding to kidnap Tomoki, who is busy peeping on a couple making out, ends up working with him to raise money by opening a flea market booth with different ideas, none of which work at all. Nymph then makes Tomoki irresistible to woman by jamming their "cool guy" senses, which causes a large group of girls to swarm around him as a host club gentleman until Nymph cancels the jamming. Tomoki thanks Nymph, who begins to doubt her loyalty to her old master. Ikaros eventually reveals to the gang that she was telling lies to try to fit in, which relieves Tomoki and Sohara. That night, Ikaros wants to know how Tomoki really feels about her. Tomoki shares a story about how he was alone, and how when she and Nymph vanished he was so worried. Ikaros then kisses Tomoki.
10	"Where the Melodious Words Of an Angel Go"; Transliteration: "Tenshi no Kotoba no Mukau Saki" (Japanese: 天使の旋律（コトバ）の向かう先)	"Bokura no Diary" (僕等のダイアリー, Bokura no Daiarī; "My Diary") (Note: "Bokura no Diary" was originally performed by the band H2O and was featured as the ending theme to the Japanese drama Tonda Couple.) by Ayahi Takagaki and Tatsuhisa Suzuki	December 6, 2009
Tomoki's high school is having a cultural festival with a rich private high school. It is until two students from the private school, them being brother and sister with their condescending attitude, that leads Tomoki to challenge them to a battle of the bands. Mikako garners support using her family's influence, while the private school's PTA does the same. During practice, Nymph shows her music ability on the keyboard and gets praised by Tomoki for that, making Ikaros jealous, but the gang discover she has another talent. It is revealed that the Master of Synapse forced Nymph to rip the wings off a bird she was keeping for his amusement. The day of the festival, the private school orchestra plays a classical music piece. (Note: The classical music piece that Sorami Private Academy plays is an excerpt from Symphony No. 9 (Dvořák) which is known as the "New World Symphony") Tomoki then sings a perverted song about nipples, but is stopped by Sohara. Then they play the real song, (Note: The English version of the song is called "Falling Down".) and Ikaros surprises everyone by singing lead vocals. The audience is stunned but gives a resounding cheer, and Tomoki's school wins. The end of the festival has a bonfire dance where couples gather and hold hands. Nymph and Sohara jump at the idea of going with Tomoki but agree to let Ikaros go instead. Ikaros enjoys herself but is fearful of how Tomoki would react if he knew the other side of her.
11	"Off We Go To My Bathhouse Paradise"; Transliteration: "Iza Yukan! Waga Paradaisu" (Japanese: いざ征かん! 我が銭湯領域（パラダイス）)	"Champion" (チャンピオン, Chanpion) (Note: "Champion" was originally performed by the band Alice in 1978.) by Ayahi Takagaki and Tatsuhisa Suzuki by Soichiro Hoshi and Saki Fujita	December 13, 2009
Tomoki invites the girls to a bathhouse, and they agree, only to snatch Ikaros's cards beforehand. Tomoki considers a different approach. After soliciting Sugata's help by relating it to the New World, Tomoki uses Sugata's card to transform into a full-fledged girl named Tomoko. The next day, Tomoko blends in well with the students, and even becomes popular with the boys, despite acting like an ideal female character. Tomoko secures a bathhouse visit, and while the Angeloids monitor status, Tomoko has a field day accidentally fondling the girls, until the perversion blows out the transformation device. After getting severely beaten by Sohara, Tomoki has to clean the entire bathhouse. The girls then enjoy their bath with the Angeloids, but both Ikaros and Nymph seem concerned.
12	"Chains of No Escape"; Transliteration: "Nogaruru Koto Kanawanu Kusari" (Japanese: 逃るること叶わぬ螺旋回廊（クサリ）)	"Akai Hana Shiroi Hana" (赤い花白い花; "Red Flower, White Flower") (Note: "Akai Hana Shiroi Hana" was originally performed by the folk band Akai Tori in 1970.) by Saori Hayami	December 20, 2009
Tomoki tries to get Ikaros to smile. Their friends offer different suggestions, none of which proved effective. Nymph gets an idea that they should go on a date, and it ends up with Tomoki dating both Angeloids. They try shopping, ponder movie suggestions, and head to an amusement park and zoo. While Tomoki gets a drink, Nymph compares the caged animals to themselves and their collars. Thinking that will please Tomoki, Ikaros frees the animals from their cages. However, the animals attack Tomoki and strip him, which gets him arrested. After Tomoki is released, Nymph states the date should end with a kiss, but while Nymph goes ahead to get a kiss from Tomoki, Ikaros, unable to bear the sight of that, flies away stating that her reactor was in pain. Tomoki, clueless of what to do, moves towards Nymph, but she finds it embarrassing as well and flees. She tells herself that she hurt Ikaros and that she cannot sadden the lives of Tomoki and Ikaros anymore. She retreats to a remote place in the woods. Elsewhere, Tomoki finds Ikaros and walks her home. Nymph, on the other hand, is suddenly hit by a powerful beam which marks the arrival of a pair of Angeloids, called Gamma-Class Harpies.
13	"Queen of the Sky"; Transliteration: "Sukai no joō" (Japanese: スカイの女王)	"Soba ni Irareru Dake de" (そばにいられるだけで; "Just to be Near") by Blue Drops	December 27, 2009
The Harpies tell Nymph they are supporting her mission to help capture Ikaros because the Master of Synapse was worried about her, but, unbeknownst to her, the Master only sees Nymph as a puppet in his scheme. Tomoki and the others prepare for their Christmas party at his home, and Tomoki tells the others not to worry about Nymph since she has left before in the past. Sohara and Ikaros stay to cook, while the others go on errands. Ikaros, who has been increasing worried about Tomoki, goes out to find him, only to say goodbye forever. A confused Tomoki, after meeting back with his friends, decides to look for her. When Ikaros finds Nymph, the latter tries to talk her into returning to Synpase but they are attacked by the Harpies. Hurt by the betrayal, Nymph protects Ikaros but is knocked down. Tomoki, running out to the hills but uncertain where to go, is then accompanied by his friends. As the Harpies tear out Nymph's wings, Tomoki and the others arrive. Ikaros reveals her true identity as a Strategic Battle-Class Angeloid capable of mass destruction, but Tomoki replies he already knows, and orders her to protect Nymph and "to kick the enemy's ass". Ikaros battles the Harpies and goes to full Uranus Queen mode, while Tomoki and the others try to break Nymph's chain. They finally do so while Ikaros defeats the Harpies. As the battle comes to an end, it begins snowing, and they later celebrate Christmas back at Tomoki's house. Also calling it Ikaros and Nymph's first birthday, Tomoki tells the Angeloids they can stay with him, and he surprises them with orange seeds. Ikaros cracks a smile for the first time in her life.
14 (OVA)	"Project Pink"; Transliteration: "Purojekuto Pinku" (Japanese: プロジェクト桃源郷（ピンク）)	"Haru Ichiban" (春一番; "First Spring") (Note: "Haru Ichiban" was originally performed by the idol band Candies in 1976.) by Saori Hayami, Mina, and Iori Nomizu	September 9, 2010
Nymph feels a bit unneeded without a master to follow, even though she is as free as a bird. Tomoki invites the gang to a water park where he peeps on the girls, who cannot swim to retaliate. Nymph hacks Tomoki's memories so he forgets how to swim. Tomoki has Ikaros speed up the current in the lazy river that the girls' bikinis come off, although he nearly drowns himself in the process. Tomoki's next perverted plan is to morph into the floor of the girls' locker room and then changes into a pair of panties, fulfilling every teenage boy's fantasy until Sohara puts them on. Afterwards, Nymph wants Tomoki to order her to make him irresistible to women again but Tomoki refuses. Sugata talks with Nymph about Tomoki's kindness to her. Later, Sugata then tries a hang gliding experiment and succeeds. Nymph asks Ikaros if she can stay with them even if it means she could steal Tomoki from her. Ikaros replies it is okay because Tomoki will always be her master.

=== Heaven's Lost Property: Forte (2010) ===
No. overall	No. in season	Title	Ending theme	Original release date
15	1	"You Strip, Too! The Return of the Full-frontal Hero"; Transliteration: "Kimi mo Nuge! Kaette Kita Yūsha" (Japanese: キミも脱げ! 帰ってきた全裸王（ユウシャ）)	"Kaeru Kara" (帰るから; "From Home") by Blue Drops	October 1, 2010
Tomoki Sakurai has another dream where the mysterious angel warns him of another Angeloid, and, after revealing the information to his friends, Nymph uses a program called the Dive Game which enables them to revisit the dreams. Tomoki and his friends enter and find themselves in Eishiro Sugata's world, which is an adventure with dinosaurs and rolling boulders, while Mikako Satsukitane's world takes place in a war zone. Sohara Mitsuki is especially embarrassed as her dream world has many ecchi situations with Tomoki. Nymph makes some corrections to ensure they enter Tomoki's dream but instead of finding a grassy hill with an angel, they find themselves in a bizarre world with a tall monolithic column inscribed with illegible words and a hibernating evergreen tree, raising more questions than answers. Sugata goes to the meadow where the cherry blossom is and recalls when Ikaros arrived, associating the giant monolithic column with similar shaped pillars. He witnesses the arrival of a new Angeloid, who seeks Tomoki with deadly intentions.
16	2	"Bombshell! The Angel is a Big Boob"; Transliteration: "Kyōgaku! Tenshi wa Kyonyū Datta" (Japanese: 驚愕! 天使は♥♥（キョニュウ）だった)	"COSMOS" by Blue Drops	October 8, 2010
Finding himself increasingly bothered and aroused by the Angeloids' feminine ways, Tomoki retreats to the mountains to train at a Zen monastery. Sugata warns Sohara, Ikaros and Nymph about the new threat to Tomoki, but the two Angeloids are not concerned about the Delta-Class Angeloid Astraea, who has a lack of computational abilities, which proves true as she immediately bungles her attacks. Later, as Tomoki buries his dirty magazines, the Angeloids interrupt him with different schemes: Nymph, who is irritated by his lechery and dislike for small chests, uses a device to enhance her age; Ikaros incinerates his magazines; and Astraea transforms into a dirty magazine. Later, Astraea serves Tomoki his meal but forgets to poison it. In the ensuing fight, Tomoki, remembering his grandfather Tomozo's perverted advice, puts Astraea through his lecherous version of the Six Domains. After Tomoki returns, Ikaros surprises him by restoring his dirty magazines, which then celebrate with a parade. Meanwhile, Astarea falls into Sugata's campsite. As she reboots, she unintentionally reveals her mission in front of Sugata.
17	3	"A Proud-fought Battle!"; Transliteration: "Puraido aru Tatakai" (Japanese: 煩悩（プライド）ある戦い)	"Kakemeguru Seishun" (かけめぐる青春) by Mina and Ayahi Takagaki	October 15, 2010
After unexpectedly divulging secret information, Astraea attacks Sugata but is easily captured. Mikako offers to help train her against Tomoki. The gang participates in another festival at the Satsukitane shrine, but the theme this year is professional wrestling. With a ten million yen prize, Tomoki debuts as Mask DuPants, much to the guys' cheers and the girls' jeers. Using ecchi wrestling holds and finishing moves, DuPants advances easily through the tournament, and battles the Angeloids in a tag team elimination match. The finals pit DuPants against Mikako in an electrified steel cage match. DuPants gets the advantage until another masked wrestler, implied to be Sohara, interferes and delivers a devastating backbreaker on DuPants, who stands but it is announced that he is already dead. Afterwards, Mikako awards the prize to Tomoki, but he must fight for the World Title against Judas, who was the shooting range man from the previous year. The closing credits show other early round matches involving the townsfolk and teachers.
18	4	"Mortal Combat! Hot Spring Snowball Fight at 1.4° Below"; Transliteration: "Shitō! Reika Itten'yondo no Kassen" (Japanese: 死闘! 零下1.4度の温泉（カッセン）)	"Miracle Guy" (ミラクル・ガイ, Mirakuru Gai) by Kaori Fukuhara	October 22, 2010
Winter comes to the city, and Astraea is still far from completing her mission of eliminating Tomoki. Mikako reels her into another of her sadistic schemes, staging a snowball battle between the girls and boys of her school, with the rule that you can still battle if you get hit and until the commander, Mikako versus Tomoki, loses. The winners get to boss around the losers for a day. While Mikako steps aside, taking Ikaros and Nymph, to search for a hot springs, Tomoki and the boys stage an assault on the strongest girl on the team, which is not Astraea but Sohara. At dusk, while the surviving girls relax at the hot springs, the boys appear to have the advantage, until the popular boys rebel by freeing the captured girls, and Tomoki's team must face the wrath of the "Abominable Snow-hara Man". When Tomoki get stuck in the snow, Astraea has her chance to take out Tomoki, but Ikaros arrives to prevent that from happening. The next day, Sugata comments how Astraea is not allowed to return to Synapse until she kills Tomoki, something he pities on her about.
19	5	"The Brother Who Came From Heaven"; Transliteration: "Tenkai kara Kita Tomodachi" (Japanese: 天界から来た超兄弟（トモダチ）)	"ff (Fortissimo)" (ff (フォルティシモ), Forutishimo) by Mina	October 29, 2010
Sugata and Sohara use Nymph's Dive Game program to travel to Tomoki's dream world, which is revealed to be Synapse, a bunch of floating islands hovering above Sorami. Sohara accidentally tips an object, which rolls and falls to the world below. The two then walk through an Angeloid village to a dome where Sugata enters a portal and finds himself observing activities in Sorami. He then finds himself in a room full of encapsulated humans, with Angeloids monitoring, and he questions his humanity. He encounters the Harpies, who have a hold of Sohara, but since he has the Dive Game on a time limit, Sugata and Sohara return to their world safe and sound. At night, Tomoki takes the strange object and builds it into a transforming panty robot pedal bicycle. He uses it for his lecherous activities and treats it like a brother, that is until Sohara discovers and destroys his friend.
20	6	"Reach a Decision! The Up and Down of Heaven and Hell"; Transliteration: "Ketsudan Seyo!! Appudaun" (Japanese: 決断せよ!! 天国と地獄（アップダウン）)	"Soldier in the Space" (ソルジャー・イン・ザ・スペース, Sorujā in za Supēsu) by Soichiro Hoshi and Tatsuhisa Suzuki	November 5, 2010
Astraea enrolls in Tomoki's class, but has to stay for remedial lessons, due to her lack of comprehension. After informing Tomoki that he is the least popular boy in school, Mikako holds a game show to settle the situation. With Sugata hosting and Ikaros supplying the questions, (Note: The closing credits for Sora no Otoshimono Forte episode 6 show Ikaros gathering data for her trivia questions.) only Nymph does well. The others suffer penalties from ecchi ravishings to cesspools and peltings of trash. However, when the questions shift to ecchi school girl trivia such as Sohara's measurements and other girls' panty colors, Tomoki catches up to Nymph. The final question, a freebie repeat of an earlier question about the ethics of an open door to the girls' locker room, causes Tomoki to struggle between choosing the correct answer and being a man. Later, Astraea challenges Tomoki in a dummy rematch, but ends up bonding with him from the games, and feels accepted at their barbecue. Meanwhile, Daedalus, the angel in Tomoki's dream, watches over her Angeloid daughters, until she is attacked by the Harpies and the Master of Synapse, who informs her he is deploying his new generation Angeloid.
21	7	"Eating Watermelon Tomoki"; Transliteration: "Tomoki Kuimasu" (Japanese: 西瓜（トモキ）喰います)	"Kaerazaru Hi no Tame ni" (帰らざる日のために; "For the Day of No Return") by Soichiro Hoshi, Saori Hayami, Mina, Tatsuhisa Suzuki, Ayahi Takagaki, Iori Nomizu and Kaori Fukuhara	November 12, 2010
Tomoki has a dream where Daedalus warns him of another Angeloid, who then interrupts the communication and chokes Ikaros. While Ikaros shops for groceries, an impoverished Astraea and Nymph raid Ikaros's watermelon patch; when she returns they try to regrow the patch but transform it into Venus flytrap looking melon monsters. After Astraea makes fun of Nymph's lack of wings, Nymph ponders how useless she is without a master. Sugata asks her to set up the Dive Game portal for some quick visits to Synapse, but during one of the trips, Nymph is pulled away for a date by Tomoki, leaving Sugata about to be attacked by the Harpies, until Daedalus pulls him out. Ikaros sees Tomoki and Nymph walking, and feels some emotions in her chest. Tomoki tells Nymph he wants to become her master, but before she starts the imprinting process, Tomoki tells Nymph to blow herself up. Nymph realizes that is not Tomoki, who then reveals itself to be the second generation Angeloid, an Epsilon-Class named Chaos, who chokes Nymph while questioning what is love.
22	8	"The Song of the Angels Echoes in the Sky"; Transliteration: "Sora ni Hibiku Utahime no Koe" (Japanese: 空に響く天使達（ウタヒメ）の声)	"Odoriko" (踊り子; "Dancer") by Saori Hayami and Ayahi Takagaki	November 19, 2010
Chaos causes Nymph to have multiple hallucinations of Tomoki abusing her constantly.While flying Ikaros sees Tomoki with Sohara and goes to search for Nymph. Ikaros arrives to assist Nymph against Chaos. Daedalus reveals to Sugata that she is the creator of the first generation Angeloids, different from Chaos. Ikaros is manipulated by one of the hallucinations, ordering her to kill Nymph, but instead she tosses her far away from danger. Nymph finds Astraea and tells her to help Ikaros, but the Master orders her to destroy Nymph. Just as she is about to carry out her order, Tomoki stops her and asks whether she will do the bidding of the Master or find the strength to choose her own destiny. When the Master orders her to kill Ikaros instead, she flies to the scene, but she breaks the chains and faces Chaos to a death match. Although Chaos still has the upper hand, Ikaros arrives and fights Chaos unassisted, eventually plunging Chaos to the depths of the sea, leaving her being asked what is love. Astrea then managed to recover Ikaros with both of them pondering on what is actually love.
23	9	"Shoot Out! Fishing At the Jumbo Carnival of Dreams"; Transliteration: "Gekitō! Yume no Janbo Kānibaru" (Japanese: 激闘! 夢の一本釣り（ジャンボカーニバル）)	"Natsu no Ojō-san" (夏のお嬢さん; "Summertime Girl") by Iori Nomizu	November 26, 2010
For this year's festival at the Satsukitane shrine, Mikako holds a "yo-yo" fishing contest where all the girls are tied up in a pool, and the guys tied on ropes must grab them out of the water. The winner is whoever can catch the fish with the biggest "yo-yos". Tomoki transforms into Tomoko for this competition, teaming up with Sugata, while Mikako partners up with Judas. Tomoko manages to snatch some of the girls until Sugata baits the buxom Astraea with some snacks, but Mikako steals the catch. Sugata then brings up the "legendary fish", one whose measurements are still growing. Tomoko transforms back to Tomoki and finds the legendary fish only to be knocked out by her karate chop. Ikaros receives a farewell letter where Tomoki proposes to her. Tomoki clarifies by giving Ikaros and Nymph an allowance. After hearing from friends on different gift suggestions for Tomoki, Ikaros decides to follow Sugata's advice, and buys herself a watermelon, after which Tomoki affirms she did good.
24	10	"Peek Into the Fantasy Field"; Transliteration: "Fantajī Fīrudo o Nozoke!" (Japanese: 節穴世界（ファンタジーフィールド）を覗け!)	"Bōkyō no Tabi" (望郷の旅; "Journey of Nostalgia") by Soichiro Hoshi and Saki Fujita	December 3, 2010
Tomoki seeks some alone time from the girls, first in the bathroom until he is washed out, and then in a closet where he is almost cooked and then washed out again. On a shopping trip with Sohara, Ikaros notices a bridal magazine and asks her about Tomoki's proposal. Later, Tomoki hides in his room and puts the final touches on his "summer project", a massive network of periscopes which allows him to peek at girls all over town. Astraea and Nymph each visit but Tomoki chases them out. Sohara visits as well, but instead of giving him a karate chop, she asks why he still peeps despite having beautiful Angeloids in his house, putting him deep in thought. After Sohara leaves, Tomoki loudly remarks how stupid Sohara was for not noticing his network. The girls get revenge by pretending to strip outside. When Tomoki peeps, the girls aim mirrors to blind him with sunlight. Tomoki retaliates by showing his "unit", shocking the girls. However, when Ikaros takes a look, Tomoki is making a kissing gesture, flushing Ikaros with emotion. She overheats, and decides to repair herself by erasing all memories of him. Meanwhile, Chaos, having interpreted love as inflicting pain on animals, emerges from the sea.
25	11	"The Edge of an Indiscriminate Requiem"; Transliteration: "Musabetsu no Hate" (Japanese: 幻想哀歌（ムサベツ）の果て)	"Kaeru Kara" (帰るから; "From Home") (Guitar Version) by Blue Drops	December 10, 2010
With Ikaros feeling ill, Tomoki and Sohara go to school where Sugata and Mikako are watching a typhoon soon approaching. Later, Astraea investigates a twister, but is attacked by Chaos, while Ikaros continues to struggle with losing her memories. Tomoki goes through the Dive Game portal to meet Daedalus, who gives him a special lock, while Nymph and Ikaros join Astraea against Chaos, who easily subdues them despite their coordinated attack. Tomoki returns and tells the Angeloids to live and that he will be the master for Nymph and Astraea. The Angeloids manage to free themselves and are revitalized by his love. Nymph generates new wings and uses a hacking field to boost Ikaros and Astraea's combat powers. After Ikaros launches her attacks, Astraea does one final lunge, knocking Chaos to the ground. Despite Chaos's pleading to be "loved to death", Tomoki arrives and pets her head, and Chaos starts to experience feelings of genuine love. Tomoki then puts Daedalus's lock on the collar chain of Chaos.
26	12	"Forte Wings Soaring for Tomorrow"; Transliteration: "Asu ni Habataku Forute" (Japanese: 明日に羽飛く彼女達(フォルテ))	Jidai Okure no Koibito-tachi (時代遅れの恋人たち; "Old-Fashioned Lovers") by Saori Hayami, Iori Nomizu and Kaori Fukuhara	December 17, 2010
Tomoki and Sugata return Chaos to Daedalus. Things return to normal, with Nymph restoring Ikaros's memories, and Tomoko later teaches Ikaros bathroom etiquette. However, Tomoki has one more perverted task, which is to transform into pool water so he can fondle girls during swim class. After Sohara and Nymph drain the pool, Mikako decides he needs to be taught a lesson. Tomoko escapes the hunt by hiding in the girls' bathroom, but is eventually trapped. While Sohara saws down the door lock, Tomoko has no choice but to escape into the toilet and go through sewage treatment to the sea. Later on, Ikaros, in trying to practice bathroom etiquette of knocking and flushing, knocks a hole in the door and flushes Tomoki again. As Ikaros searches for Tomoki, Mikako sees her and offers to help with her proposal situation. A flushed out Tomoki is taken to a wedding chapel. With Sugata and Mikako presiding, Ikaros appears dressed in a bridal gown. She and Tomoki go through a wedding ceremony, but when they are about to kiss, Tomoki stops. Mikako then gives him a choice: he can pick Ikaros, Nymph, Astraea, or Sohara, all of whom are dressed as brides. Tomoki screams at the indecision, but the ceremony is interrupted by a reformed Chaos, who gives Tomoki a hug, and becomes the newest resident Angeloid.
