= Picasso (band) =

Japanese rock band

- Origin: Japan
- Years active: 1984–1995; 2000–
- Labels: VAP (1984 - 1986); Kitty Records (1986 - 1995); METORONOM Records (2000 - Present)
- Members: Tetsuya Tsujihata (Vocals, Guitar); Junji Azuma (Bass); Hideharu Mori (Keyboard)
- Website: Project Picasso

Picasso (ピカソ Pikaso) is a three-member Japanese rock band that debuted in 1984. Their biggest hit in the 1980s was "Cinema", the closing theme song for anime television series Maison Ikkoku.

== Background ==
The band's first single was "Honki! Tricky Lady" in 1984. In 1986, their experimental sound gained them wide popularity among anime fans with their hits "Cinema" and "Fantasy+, both theme songs for the anime television series Maison Ikkoku. After not releasing anything since 1995, the band signed with Metronom Records in 2000 in order to produce and handle new talent.

== Band members ==
- Tetsuya Tsujihata (辻畑 鉄也 Tsujihata Tetsuya). Leader, vocals, guitar. Born on February 29, 1956, in Ube City, Yamaguchi Prefecture, Japan. A graduate of Keio University.
- Junji Azuma (東 純二 Azuma Junji). Bass guitar. Born on December 1, 1956, in Setagaya, Tokyo, Japan. A graduate of Tokai University.
- Hideharu Mori (森 英治 Mori Hideharu). Keyboards. Born on February 26, 1958, in Osaka Prefecture, Japan. His older brother is the lyricist Yukinojō Mori.

== Discography ==
Listed chronologically.

=== Singles ===
Titles listed as: title (date, other information).

- Honki! Tricky Lady (September 21, 1984)
- Tide (January 21, 1985, music for a Flouveil product commercial)
- Cinema (August 21, 1985, ending theme for Maison Ikkoku)
- Fantasy (November 1, 1986, ending theme for Maison Ikkoku)
- Sayonara no Dessan (May 25, 1987, ending theme for Maison Ikkoku)
- Begin the Night (September 25, 1987, ending theme for Maison Ikkoku)
- On the Road (March 21, 1988, music for an Esso commercial)
- Taiyō dake ga Shitteita (May 25, 1989)
- Shout (January 25, 1990, theme for the Fuji TV drama Aitsu ga Trouble)
- Cinema '90 (April 25, 1990)
- Tsukiyo ni Dance (July 25, 1990)
- Boku no Hitomi no March (July 17, 1992, music for an Epson commercial)
- A Piece of Love (theme song for the Ranma ½ movie Nihao, My Concubine)
- My Back Page (September 1, 1993, insert song for the NTV show Arashi no Naka no Ai no you ni)
- Ashita no Kaze (August 25, 1994, music for a Tokyo Nissin Educational Institution commercial)
- Breakfast Newspaper (February 25, 1995, maxi-single)
- Parade: Breakfast Newspaper 2 (June 25, 1995, maxi-single)

=== Albums ===
- Picasso (August 21, 1985)
- Diamond no Tsuki (August 21, 1986)
- Cinema (December 21, 1986, "best" album)
- Photograph (May 25, 1987)
- Marmalade Kids (July 25, 1989)
- 12-iro no Hammer (August 25, 1989)
- Seize (November 15, 1990, "best" album)
- Vertigo (August 11, 1993, soundtrack for NTV show Arashi no Naka no Ai no you ni)
- Early Best '84-'86 (October 1, 1993, "best" album)
- Champion no Nostalgie (September 24, 1994)
- Shopping List (September 25, 1995, "best" album)
- Shopping List 2 (June 26, 1996, "best" album)
- Warau Rakuda (June 20, 2000, "live" album)
- Warau Rakuda (June 20, 2000, "best" album)
- Garam Masala (August 9, 2000)
- Hammer Makers (December 1, 2000)
- Present for Lovers (May 10, 2001)
- Spice (October 4, 2002)
