= Hatsukoi (Kōzō Murashita album) =

Studio album by Kōzō Murashita
- Released: 25 August 1983

Kōzō Murashita chronology
| Yume no Ato (1982) | Hatsukoi (1983) | Kajin (1984) |

Hatsukoi - Asaki Yumemishi (初恋〜浅き夢みし〜, 'first love - shallow dreams') is a 1983 album by Kōzō Murashita for CBS Sony. The album is generally known by the large font title Hatsukoi, although the full title includes the small font subscript "Shallow dreams". The title track "Hatsukoi" had already been released as the artist's fifth single in February 1983, becoming his first major hit, and after his death remaining one of Murashita's best known and most covered songs. The other single from the album, "Odoriko", released the same day as the album, 25 August 1983, was also a hit. The album was reissued in 1990 and 2013, and is Murashita's best-selling album.

== Track listing ==
All tracks' music composed, and lyrics written, by Murashita.

1. Hatsukoi 初恋
2. Yume no chizu 夢の地図
3. Odoriko 踊り子
4. Fuyu monogatari 冬物語
5. Mozaic モ・ザ・イ・ク
6. Oideyo おいでよ
7. Aoi arashi 青い嵐
8. Banka 挽歌
9. Watashi hitori 私一人
10. Oka-no-ue kara 丘の上から
