= Ichiko (musician) =

Japanese singer and songwriter (born 1970)

- Born: February 16, 1970 (age 56)
- Occupations: singer and songwriter

ICHIKO (イチコ), born February 16, 1970, is a Japanese singer and songwriter. She has performed theme songs for animation.

== Discography ==
=== Singles ===
1. Koi no Mahou (Released November 19, 2003)
  1. Koi no Mahou (Anime television series Maburaho opening theme)
  2. We'd get there someday (Anime television series Maburaho ending theme)
2. First Kiss (Released July 26, 2006)
  1. First Kiss (Anime television series Zero no Tsukaima first season opening theme)
  2. Treasure (PlayStation 2 video game Zero no Tsukaima ~Koakuma to Harukaze no Concerto~ opening theme)
3. RISE (Released March 21, 2007)
  1. RISE (Anime television series Rocket Girls opening theme)
  2. Waratte! (Anime television series Rocket Girls ending theme for episode 12)
  3. Chikai (Anime television series Rocket Girls insert theme)
4. Chiisana Bokura no Ōki na HEART (Released June 20, 2007)
  1. Chiisana Bokura no Ōki na HEART (Anime television series Kodai Ōja Kyōryū Kingu Dī Kizzu Adobenchā: Yokuryū Densetsu opening theme)
  2. 1 2 3 4 Go Go GOoooo!!! ~Kyouryuu Kazoeuta~ (Anime television series Kodai Ōja Kyōryū Kingu Dī Kizzu Adobenchā: Yokuryū Densetsu image song)
5. I SAY YES (Released July 25, 2007)
  1. I SAY YES (Anime television series Zero no Tsukaima second season opening theme)
  2. LOVE Imagination (PlayStation 2 video game Zero no Tsukaima ~Muma ga Tsumugu Yokaze no Gensoukyoku~ opening theme)
6. YOU'RE THE ONE (Released July 23, 2008)
  1. YOU'RE THE ONE (Anime television series Zero no Tsukaima third season opening theme)
  2. Sweet Angel (PlayStation 2 video game Zero no Tsukaima ~Maigo no Period to Ikusen no Symphony~ opening theme)
7. I'LL BE THERE FOR YOU (Released February 1, 2012)
  1. I'LL BE THERE FOR YOU (Anime television series Zero no Tsukaima fourth season opening theme)
  2. Endless Romance
