= Rika Himenogi =

Japanese singer (born 1971)

Rika Himenogi (姫乃樹リカ)
- Born: Rika Nishimura (西村理香); October 6, 1971 (age 54)
- Occupations: Singer; model

Rika Himenogi (姫乃樹 リカ, Himenogi Rika), real name Rika Nishimura (西村理香, Nishimura Rika), is a Japanese singer born on October 6, 1971, in Bungo-ōno, Ōita, Japan.

== Career ==
Himenogi got her start in music on the 1980s idol variety show Momoko Club, which featured girls who appeared in the Momoko gravure magazine.

Two of her songs have been featured in anime, Glass Kiss in the Maison Ikkoku film and Stand By Me in Yawara! A Fashionable Judo Girl.

While Himenogi put her career on hold after becoming a mother, she started occasionally returning to Japan to perform from 2019, after her children left home.

== Family ==
Rika is married to bass player of Foghat, World XXI, and Michael Fath, Dave Crigger. They live in Virginia, near Washington DC. They have three children, and two grandchildren.
