= Kōzō Murashita =

Japanese singer-songwriter (1953–1999)

Kōzō Murashita 村下 孝蔵

Background information
- Born: Murashita Kōzō; February 28, 1953; Minamata, Kumamoto, Japan
- Died: June 25, 1999 (aged 46) Shibuya, Tokyo, Japan
- Genre: J-pop
- Occupation: Singer-songwriter
- Instruments: Singing, guitar
- Years active: 1980–1999
- Label: Sony Music Japan
- Website: Sony Music Japan

Kōzō Murashita (村下 孝蔵, Murashita Kōzō; February 28, 1953 – June 24, 1999) was a Japanese singer-songwriter who was born in Minamata, Kumamoto, Japan. He died of a brain hemorrhage in 1999.

== Discography ==
=== Singles ===
Titles listed as: A side / B side (year, other info)

- Tsuki Akari / Matsuyama Yuki Ferry (1980)
- Shun'u / Kajin (1981)
- Kikyō / Miseinen (1981)
- Yūko / Kagerō (1982)
- Hatsukoi / Oka no Ue kara (1983)
  - "Hatsukoi" was covered by Hiroko Mita in April 1983. Murashita himself had chosen Mita to cover the song since he was a fan of hers and thought it would suit her.
  - It was also remade in 2000 and used as the opening theme for the final episode of the anime series Boys Be..., performed by Yuka Imai, and again in 2017 by Nao Toyama for the anime Tsuki ga Kirei and covered by Saori Hayami (in character) in 2007 for the anime Sora no Otoshimono.
  - Its Cantonese cover by Samantha Lam (1984) was used for Stephen Chow's God of Cookery (1996).
- Odoriko / Fuyu Monogatari (1983)
- Shōjo / Karen (1984)
- Yume no Tsuzuki / Nigaoe (1984)
- Kazaguruma / Shiawase no Jikan (1986)
- Negai / Tomarigi (1986, Negai was used in a commercial for "Myōjō Charumera")
- Hi Damari / Shiroi Hana no Saku koro (1987, Hi Damari was a theme song for the Fuji TV anime series Maison Ikkoku)
- Aishū Monogatari: Aishū ni Sayonara / Utsukushi Sugiru Mistake (1987)
- Kaze no Tayori / Neko (1988, Kaze was an image song for Akai Hane Kyōdō Bakin)
- Hatsukoi Mini Album (1988, includes Hatsukoi, Odoriko, Yūko, Shōjo and Shun'u)
- Hatsukoi / Shōjo (1989)
- Yūko / Odoriko (1989)
- Sonnet / Kinjirareta Asobi (1990)
- Akina / Takahashi (1991)
- Kono Kuni ni Umarete Yokatta / Kitaku (1991, Kono Kuni was used in a House Shokuhin commercial for "Tokusensei Wasabi")
- Hitotsubu no Suna / Hitorigoto (1992)
- Romance Car / Pinball (1992)
- Hatsukoi / Yūko / Akina (1993)
- Tsuretette / Ringo demo Issho ni (1994)
- Hatsukoi / Odoriko (1995)
- 16-sai / Anata Odorimasen ka (1996)
- Dōsōkai / Sunao (1998)

=== Albums ===
- Sore zore no Kaze (1979, independent label)
- Kiteki ga Kikoeru Machi (1980, along with Tsuki Akari, his debut album)
- Izuko e (1981)
- Yume no Ato (1982)
- Hatsukoi: Asaki Yumemishi (1983)
- Kajin (1984)
- Hanazakari (1984)
- Kazaguruma (1986)
- Hi Damari (1987)
- Kajin II (1987)
- Koibumi (1988)
- Nogiku yo Boku ha... (1989)
- Seiryō Aichōban (1990)
- Shin Nihon Kikō (1991)
- Na mo nai Hoshi (1992)
- Ai Sareru tame ni (1994)
- Ringo to Lemon (1995)
- Dōsōkai (1999, memorial album)
- Shinobi Aruki no Tasogare ni (1999)
- Ramune to Peach Sandal (2000)
- Yume no Kiroku (2000)
- Junjō Karen (2001, contains rare recordings from his amateur days)
- Tanabata Yasōkyoku (2005, singles best album, 7th anniversary memorial album)
- Tsukimachi Aishūka (2005, collection of "live" recordings, includes a DVD)

== Video releases ==
- Junjō (2001, DVD/VHS)

== Lyrics anthology ==
- Hatsukoi: Asaki Yumemishi
