= Kitty Films =

Japanese animation studio

Kitty Films Co., Ltd.
- Native name: 株式会社キティフィルム
- Romanized name: Kabushiki-gaisha Kiti Firumu
- Type: Kabushiki gaisha
- Industry: Production company
- Founded: 1972; 54 years ago
- Founder: Hidenori Taga
- Defunct: 1996; 30 years ago
- Fate: Reincorporated as Kitty Group; properties now split between various companies
- Headquarters: Japan
- Divisions: Kitty Film Mitaka Studio

Kitty Films Co., Ltd. (キティフィルム Kabushiki-gaisha Kiti Firumu) was a production company established in 1972 in Japan. They were a pioneer in releasing full anime television series in a single set. The sound recording work by Ken'ichi Benitani on their 1979 film, Almost Transparent Blue, was co-nominated (with Benitani's work on another film) for Outstanding Achievement in Sound Recording at the 3rd Japan Academy Film Prize ceremony in 1980.

== History ==
The company was first established in 1972 as Kitty Music Corporation under Hidenori Taga, producing TV drama soundtracks. Their first was for the 1972 film Hajimete no Tabi.

By 1979, the company began to branch off into live action with the films Almost Transparent Blue and Lady Oscar (a live-action adaptation of the manga The Rose of Versailles). Almost Transparent Blue received a nomination for Outstanding Achievement in Sound Recording for Ken'ichi Benitani at the 3rd Japan Academy Film Prize ceremony in 1980 (shared nomination with Benitani's work on The Man Who Stole the Sun).

Kitty's entry into anime production began with the 1981 television anime series Urusei Yatsura, based on Rumiko Takahashi's manga of the same name. They would go on to produce most of the animated versions of Maison Ikkoku and Ranma ½, as well. The actual animation of Kitty's works was handled by several independent anime studios. Studio Pierrot did the animation for the first half of Urusei Yatsura, Studio Deen animated the second half (except for several of the OVAs) and all of Maison Ikkoku and Ranma ½, while Madhouse handled the final Urusei Yatsura movie, some of the later Urusei Yatsura OVAs, Legend of the Galactic Heroes, and Yawara: A Fashionable Judo Girl!. Kitty was a pioneer in releasing complete collections of series, beginning with the limited-run 50-disc laserdisc collection of Urusei Yatsura in May 1987, which sold out quickly and led to many other companies releasing series in laserdisc and (later) DVD box sets.

The company had suffered financial troubles from early on, which started to come to a head towards the end of the Ranma TV series in 1992. Hidenori Taga had in fact helped finance Kitty's film division by spending money from their music branch, and that year was forced to step down due to an unknown scandal, while Shigekazu Ochiai transferred to Pao House Studios (he died in 1999). Around 1995, Kitty Enterprise was purchased by PolyGram.

Kitty continued to produce less well-known shows such as Ping Pong Club (1995), but their output shrank to almost nothing by the end of the 20th century. Rumiko Takahashi did not work with Kitty again after the last Ranma OVA was released in 1996; Sunrise handled the animation duties on Inuyasha, and TMS animated Rumic Theater.

Kitty also had a subsidiary animation studio that produced a few anime series and OVAs. The studio's name was Kitty Film Mitaka Studio and never became as famous or successful as its parent. The studio was eventually disbanded.

Kitty Films was eventually reincorporated as Kitty Group and mainly exists as a talent agency, having sold off the rights to most of the Kitty Films library. The Kitty Records library is currently controlled by Universal Music Japan.

== Works ==
Year	Title	Animated by	Format	Note
1981	Urusei Yatsura (TV series)	Studio Pierrot & Studio Deen	TV series	Sold to Pony Canyon, Blu-ray release sub-licensed to Warner Bros. Japan
1983	Urusei Yatsura (film series)	Various (Note: Studio Pierrot (films 1 and 2), Studio Deen (films 3 and 4), Magic Bus (film 5) and Madhouse (film 6))	Film	Sold to Pony Canyon, Blu-ray release sub-licensed to Warner Bros. Japan
1983	Creamy Mami, the Magic Angel	Studio Pierrot	TV series	
1985	Touch	Group TAC	TV series	
1986	Pastel Yumi, the Magic Idol	Studio Pierrot	TV series	
1986	Maison Ikkoku	Studio Deen	TV series	Sold to Pony Canyon, Blu-ray release sub-licensed to Warner Bros. Japan.
1986	Tobira o Akete	Magic Bus	Film	
1986	They Were Eleven	Magic Bus	Film	
1987	Twilight of the Cockroaches	Madhouse	Film	A live-action/animation hybrid film.
1988	F	Studio Deen	TV series	
1988	Kiteretsu Daihyakka	Studio Gallop	TV series	
1989	Ranma ½	Studio Deen	TV series	Sold to Pony Canyon.
1989	Yawara: A Fashionable Judo Girl!	Madhouse	TV series	Sold to VAP.
1992	Super Zugan	Studio Deen	TV series	
1995	Zenki	Studio Deen	TV series	Rights transferred to K-Factory.
1995	The Ping Pong Club	Grouper Productions	TV series	
1997	Sakura Diaries	Shaft	OVA	Produced by Kitty Films and later released by Victor Entertainment, which continued the project after Kitty Films went bankrupt.

=== International co-productions ===
- 1988: What's Michael? (TV) (co-production with Créativité et Développement (France); animation services by K.K. C&D Asia and Daume)
- 1992: The Adventures of T-Rex (co-production with Gunther-Wahl Productions (U.S.) and Créativité et Développement (France); animation services by Madhouse)

=== Works animated by Kitty Film Mitaka Studio ===
Year	Title	Director	Story by	Format	No. of eps.	Note
1983	Miyuki	Mizuho Nishikubo	Shigeru Yanagawa	TV series	37	The only anime television series animated by Kitty Film Mitaka Studio. The series aired on Fuji TV.
1984	Radio City Fantasy	Mizuho Nishikubo	Takeshi Shudō	OVA	1	
1985	Karuizawa Syndrome	Mizuho Nishikubo	Tokio Tsuchiya	Film	1	
1988	What's Michael?	Makoto Nagao (#1); Yoriyasu Kogawa (#2)	Shigeru Yanagawa	OVA	2	
1988	Legend of the Galactic Heroes	Noboru Ishiguro	Masatoshi Tahara	OVA	86	Seasons 1 to 3 only. The rights were transferred to K-Factory, which produced the 4th season (eps 87–110).
1989	The Enemy's the Pirates!	Katsuhisa Yamada	Akinori Endō	OVA	6	
1990	Yagami's Family Affairs	Shin'ya Sadamitsu	Akinori Endō	OVA	3	
1991	Sohryuden: Legend of the Dragon Kings	Osamu Dezaki	Akinori Endō	OVA	12	
