= Maison Ikkoku =

Manga series by Rumiko Takahashi

- First tankōbon volume cover, featuring Yusaku Godai (front) and Kyoko Otonashi (back)

めぞん一刻 (Mezon Ikkoku)
- Genre: Coming-of-age; Romantic comedy; Slice of life
- Manga
- Written by: Rumiko Takahashi
- Published by: Shogakukan
- English publisher: NA: Viz Media
- Magazine: Big Comic Spirits
- English magazine: NA: Animerica Extra (4 chapters)
- Original run: November 15, 1980 – April 20, 1987
- Volumes: 15
Further information
Audio drama
Music by	Ichirou Mizuki
Station	NHK Radio 1
Released	November 20, 1982
Episodes	1
Anime television series
Directed by	Kazuo Yamazaki (#1–36); Takashi Annō (#23–52); Naoyuki Yoshinaga (#53–96)
Produced by	Makoto Kubo; Yōko Matsushita; Yūko Katō (#1–76); Yoshinobu Nakao (#77–96); Yūichi Kōno (#77–96)
Written by	Tokio Tsuchiya (#1–36); Kazunori Itō (#23–52); Hideo Takayashiki (#53–96)
Music by	Takao Sugiyama; Kenji Kawai (#23–96)
Studio	Studio Deen
Licensed by	NA: Viz Media
Original network	FNS (Fuji TV)
Original run	March 26, 1986 – March 2, 1988
Episodes	96
Live-action film
Apartment Fantasy
Directed by	Shinichirō Sawai
Studio	Toei Company
Released	October 10, 1986
Runtime	97 minutes
Anime television film
The Final Chapter
Directed by	Tomomi Mochizuki
Produced by	Yōko Matsushita
Written by	Tomomi Mochizuki; Michiru Shimada
Music by	Hideharu Mori
Studio	Ajiado
Original network	FNS (Fuji TV)
Released	February 6, 1988
Runtime	66 minutes
Original video animation
Through the Passing Seasons
Directed by	Naoyuki Yoshinaga
Produced by	Yōko Matsushita; Makoto Kubo; Satoshi Suzuki
Music by	Takao Sugiyama; Kenji Kawai
Studio	Studio Deen
Released	September 25, 1988
Runtime	90 minutes
Original video animation
Shipwrecked on Ikkoku Island
Directed by	Setsuko Shibuichi
Produced by	Yōko Matsushita
Written by	Hideo Takayashi
Music by	Takao Sugiyama; Kenji Kawai
Studio	Magic Bus
Released	January 31, 1991
Runtime	23 minutes
Original video animation
Prelude: When the Cherry Blossoms Return in the Spring
Music by	Takao Sugiyama; Kenji Kawai
Studio	Studio Deen
Released	June 25, 1992
Runtime	27 minutes
Live-action television film
Directed by	Katsuhide Motoki
Released	May 12, 2007
Live-action television film
Kanketsuhen
Directed by	Akabane Hiroshi
Released	July 26, 2008
- icon

Maison Ikkoku (Japanese: めぞん一刻, Hepburn: Mezon Ikkoku; "Ikkoku House") is a Japanese manga series written and illustrated by Rumiko Takahashi. It was serialized in Shogakukan's seinen manga magazine Big Comic Spirits from November 1980 to April 1987, with the chapters collected in 15 tankōbon volumes. Maison Ikkoku is a romantic comedy involving a group of eccentric people who live in a boarding house in 1980s Tokyo. The story focuses primarily on the gradually developing relationships between Yusaku Godai, a poor student down on his luck, and Kyoko Otonashi, a young, recently widowed boarding house manager.

The manga was adapted into a 96-episode anime television series created by Studio Deen that ran on Fuji TV from March 1986 to March 1988. A Final Chapter movie, three original video animations (OVAs), and a music special were also produced, with a live-action film made by Toei in 1986. A live-action TV special aired in May 2007 on TV Asahi, with a finale aired in July 2008. Both the manga and anime have been released in North America by Viz Media.

Maison Ikkoku has been both critically and commercially successful, with over 25 million copies in circulation.

== Plot ==
The story mainly takes place at Maison Ikkoku (一刻館, Ikkoku-kan), a worn and aging boarding house in a fictional Tokyo ward called Tokeizaka (時計坂; "Clock Hill"), where college applicant Yusaku Godai lives. Though honest and good-natured, he is weak-willed and often taken advantage of by the other residents of Maison Ikkoku, each with their offbeat and mischievous personalities: Yotsuya the voyeur, shameless Akemi Roppongi and the Ichinose family, primarily the alcoholic, gossiping stay-at-home mom Hanae Ichinose. As he is about to move out, he is stopped at the door by the beautiful Kyoko Otonashi (née Chigusa), who announces she will be taking over as the resident manager. Godai immediately falls in love with her and decides to stay. Godai and the other tenants find out that despite her young age, Kyoko is a widow: after she married her high school teacher Soichiro, he died shortly thereafter. Godai empathizes with Kyoko and endeavors to free her from her sadness. He manages to work up enough courage to confess his love to her, and just as their nascent relationship begins to develop, Kyoko meets the rich, handsome and charming tennis coach Shun Mitaka at her neighborhood tennis club. Mitaka quickly declares his intention to court Kyoko and states that he is very patient, and can wait until her heart is ready.

Godai, not willing to give up, continues to chase Kyoko, but through a series of misunderstandings, he is seen by Kyoko and Mitaka walking with the cute and innocent Kozue Nanao, who he had met previously at one of his many part-time jobs. For the rest of the series, Kozue is mistakenly perceived as Godai's girlfriend, including by Kozue herself. Angered by this, Kyoko begins to openly date Mitaka. Despite the misunderstandings, Kyoko and Godai clearly have feelings for each other, and their relationship continues to grow over the course of the series. Godai eventually manages to get into college and, with the help of the Otonashi family, he begins student-teaching at Kyoko's old high school. Almost mirroring Kyoko's first romance, Godai catches the attention of precocious and brazen student Ibuki Yagami, who immediately begins pursuing him. Her outspoken approach stands in stark contrast to Kyoko, which helps Kyoko face her feelings for Godai.

Meanwhile, Mitaka's endeavors have been hindered by his phobia of dogs, as Kyoko owns a large white dog named Soichiro in honor of her late husband. He eventually overcomes his phobia but, when he is about to propose to Kyoko, his family begins to goad him into an arranged marriage with the pure and innocent heiress Asuna Kujo. Feeling the pressure, Mitaka begins to pursue Kyoko with increased aggression. He slowly realizes that she has decided on Godai and is waiting for him to find a job and propose. Mitaka is completely pulled out of the race following a drunken night, after which he misremembers sleeping with Asuna. When she later announces a pregnancy, he takes responsibility and proposes to Asuna, but finds out too late that it was her dog who was pregnant and not her; however he fully realizes that he has loved her since their first meeting and promises to never make her feel second-best in their marriage.

As things begin to really go well for Godai, Kozue Nanao makes a reappearance in his life. Kozue tells Godai and the other Maison Ikkoku tenants that she is thinking of marrying another man, and when Godai said he is planning his own proposal, Kozue misunderstands and believes he intends to propose to her. Kyoko, feeling foolish and betrayed, slaps Godai and demands that he move out. When Godai refuses, he wakes up the next morning to find she has left, moving in with her parents and leaving her room empty. Godai tries to explain himself by visiting Kyoko every day, but she refuses to answer the door or grant him an audience. After her rage cools, Kyoko checks on Maison Ikkoku and runs into the other tenants. They try to convince her to return.

The woman I love ... burns with jealousy, leaps to conclusions, and turns to ice. But when she laughs ... the world is mine.

— Yusaku Godai (Rumiko Takahashi, tr. Gerard Jones), Chapter 152

The libertine Akemi, sensing that Kyoko is still hesitant, threatens to seduce Godai if Kyoko does not want him. She later tells the other tenants that she only said that to threaten Kyoko into coming back. However, this backfires when Kozue sees Godai leaving a love hotel with Akemi; innocently, he was called there only to cover the room fees. Before she learns the truth, Kozue accepts the marriage proposal from the other man. As Kyoko is about to return to Maison Ikkoku, she learns about the love hotel incident that has ended Godai's relationship with Kozue, but assumes he slept with Akemi. Kyoko insults Godai, tells him that she hates him, and runs away. Godai follows her, pleading that she does not trust him and that, despite the many misunderstandings he has had with other women, she never considered Godai's feelings. He passionately declares that he loves only her: from the first moment he saw Kyoko, she has been the only woman in his eyes. Kyoko finally decides to no longer hold back her feelings for Godai and the two consummate their love; the following morning, she happily confesses that she has been in love with him for the longest time. Having cleared his last barrier after securing a teaching job, Godai proposes to Kyoko and, with the blessings of both families, they get married. The story ends as Godai and Kyoko arrive home with their newborn daughter, Haruka, and Kyoko tells her that Maison Ikkoku is the place where they first met.

== Production ==
Takahashi created Maison Ikkoku as a love story that could occur in the real world. She originally only wanted to start the series focusing on Kyoko and Godai's relationship before moving on to include the other tenants to have a "human drama", but said the love story attracted her more and took over. She had wanted to create a story about an apartment complex for some time, as when she lived in an apartment in Nakano during college, there was another decrepit apartment behind it. The strange actions of the people living there served as inspiration.

It was Big Comic Spirits's editor-in-chief Katsuya Shirai who recruited Takahashi for the newly-launching seinen manga magazine. Soichiro Suzuki, Takahashi's third editor on Maison Ikkoku beginning from the eighth or ninth chapter, explained that having a young up-and-coming female artist attracted much attention for the new magazine. Suzuki also said that Takahashi went with the romantic comedy genre for the new series because of the magazine's older reader demographic, but noted it still had the gag-like feel of Urusei Yatsura in the beginning. According to both Shirai and Suzuki, Maison Ikkoku was popular right from the start.

Takahashi created Maison Ikkoku simultaneously alongside the weekly Urusei Yatsura. The newer manga's frequency changed as Big Comic Spirits's did; it began as a monthly magazine, switched to bimonthly after six months, and became a weekly publication in 1986. In an interview during its serialization, Takahashi stated she usually took two days to create the story and draw rough drafts, and then took one night to finish them. At the time she had three female assistants, refusing to have males so that they would not be distracted. According to Suzuki, this increased to five assistants when it became a weekly serial. The series' title utilizes the French word maison ("house") and translates to "The House of One-Moment". The story occurs over a six-year period, approximate to the publication period of the series.

== Media ==
=== Manga ===
Written and illustrated by Rumiko Takahashi, Maison Ikkoku was serialized in the seinen manga magazine Big Comic Spirits as 162 chapters between November 15, 1980, and April 20, 1987. The chapters were collected and published in 15 tankōbon volumes by Shogakukan from May 1, 1982, to July 1, 1987. The series has since been re-released in several different editions. A 10 volume wide-ban edition was released between September 1, 1992, and June 1, 1993, 10 bunkoban from 1996 to 1997, and 15 shinsōban throughout 2007.

North American publisher Viz Media originally released the series, adapted into English by Gerard Jones, in a monthly comic book format from June 1993. This release was collected in 14 graphic novels. The images were "flipped" to read left-to-right, causing the art to be mirrored, and some chapters were out of order or completely missing. Four of the five missing chapters were published in Animerica Extra Vol. 3 Number 1 and Vol. 3 Number 2. Viz later re-released the series in its original format and chapter order across 15 volumes. These were released between September 24, 2003, and February 14, 2006. At New York Comic Con 2019, Viz announced that they would release Maison Ikkoku in a collector's edition, with the first volume released on September 15, 2020, and the tenth and last on December 27, 2022.

=== Radio drama ===
A radio drama was broadcast on November 20, 1982, on NHK Radio 1 as part of an episode of the "Radio Comics" program. The segment was hosted by Yū Mizushima and Keiko Yokozawa, and featured manga artist Jun Ishiko as a guest. It also included an interview with Rumiko Takahashi by Mizushima. The music for the episode was composed by Ichirou Mizuki. It featured Mari Okamoto as Kyoko, Kazuhiko Inoue as Godai, Midori Katō as Hanae Ichinose, Yusaku Yara as Yotsuya, Eiko Hisamura as Akemi, and was narrated by Junpei Takiguchi.

=== Anime ===
Maison Ikkoku was adapted into a ninety-six episode anime television series by Studio Deen and aired on Fuji TV from March 26, 1986, to March 2, 1988. The series was directed by Kazuo Yamazaki for the first 26 episodes, Takashi Anno from episode 27 until 52 and Naoyuki Yoshinaga for the remainder of the series. The production staff had previously worked on the anime adaption of Takahashi's previous work, Urusei Yatsura. After production of that series was completed, the team moved straight onto Maison Ikkoku and the series took over Urusei Yatsura's timeslot. A new HD remaster of the series has been created and released on two Blu-ray boxsets in Japan. The first box was released on December 25, 2013, and the second box followed on April 23, 2014.

An animated theatrical film titled The Final Chapter was released on February 6, 1988, as a double feature with Urusei Yatsura Movie 5: The Final Chapter. On September 25, 1988, an original video animation Through the Passing Seasons that summarizes the story was released. A video titled Karaoke Music Parade and collecting all the TV anime's opening and ending animations was released in November 1989. Shipwrecked on Ikkoku Island was released on January 31, 1991, and adapts a story of the manga, while Prelude Maison Ikkoku: When the Cherry Blossoms Return in the Spring utilizes all the flashbacks of Kyoko's life before she moved to Maison Ikkoku and was released on June 25, 1992.

The anime was licensed for a North American release by Viz Media in 1994, and was put on two-episode VHS dub releases, but Viz dropped the English dub after 36 episodes. The remaining subtitled-only VHS releases went on until volume 32, without finishing the series. Viz released the series as 8 DVD boxsets from June 1, 2003, until June 4, 2006, with the latter episodes newly dubbed. In the newer episodes, Godai was given a new voice actor, as Jason Gray-Stanford was replaced by Brad Swaile. Other characters such as Kozue and Ikuko were also recast.

=== Live-action ===
A live-action film adaptation of Maison Ikkoku was released on October 10, 1986, by the Toei Company. Directed by Shinichirō Sawai and written by Yōzō Tanaka, the movie stars Mariko Ishihara as Kyoko Otonashi, Ken Ishiguro as Yusaku Godai and Masatō Ibu as Yotsuya.

A live-action TV special premiered on TV Asahi on May 12, 2007. It stars Taiki Nakabayashi as Yusaku and Misaki Ito as Kyoko. A finale to the show was aired on July 26, 2008, under the title Maison Ikkoku Kanketsuhen and featuring Akina Minami as Kozue Nanao and Ikki Sawamura as Shun Mitaka.

=== Music ===
Beginning in 1986, various collections of theme songs, incidental music, character albums, and music calendars were released on LP, cassette, CD, and VHS. Most of the albums were released through Kitty Records. A Maison Ikkoku Sound Theater series of 48 discs released the full soundtracks of all 96 episodes as audio dramas. An addition Sound Theater release contained audio from the Side Story: Ikkoku Island Flirtation Story and Prelude, When the Cherry Blossoms Return in the Spring OVAs.

Two box sets, Maison Ikkoku CD Single Memorial File and Maison Ikkoku Complete Music Box, collected all of the theme songs and incidental music from the animated series.

=== Other media ===
Several video games based on Maison Ikkoku have been released, the first being Maison Ikkoku: Omoide no Photograph (めぞん一刻 ～想いでのフォトグラフ～) developed by Microcabin, which was originally released in 1986 for the PC-9801 and PC Engine before being ported to the Famicom in 1988 by Bothtec. Microcabin also created Maison Ikkoku Kanketsuhen: Sayonara, Soshite... (めぞん一刻完結篇 ～さよなら、そして……～) in 1988 for the PC-9801 and MSX2. Three pachislot video games were also released in 2006, 2009 and 2012.

The series was featured in the music video "I'm Alive" of the American singer-songwriter Norah Jones, released in October 2020. The series was chosen due to the similarities of the female figure of the lyrics of the song to Kyoko Otonashi.

== Reception ==
Maison Ikkoku has over 25 million collected volumes in circulation. In 2002, Christopher Macdonald, co-editor-in-chief of Anime News Network, wrote that while far from her most popular, Maison Ikkoku is considered by many to be Rumiko Takahashi's best work. Although all her titles have a romantic angle, he said that with its lack of supernatural elements or aliens, Maison Ikkoku's simple premise of a university student who falls in love with his landlady is mundane in comparison, but it is this excellently crafted romantic story that makes it her greatest work. Macdonald wrote that what it does have in common with most of Takahashi's other works is "absolute, unadulterated hilarity", but this differs still in that it features hilarious situations that actually happen in the real world. Like Macdonald, Comics Beat's Morgana Santilli noted how Maison Ikkoku is an anomaly in Takahashi's bibliography as it contains no fantasy or magical elements, but does include her signature wacky romcom hijinks of "jealous would-be lovers, plenty of pratfalls, and needlessly complicated misunderstandings", which makes it just as charming and fun as more popular works like Ranma ½.

Jason Thompson claimed that while Maison Ikkoku was not the first men's love-com, it is "almost certainly the best" and definitely Takahashi's best work. He also stated that because the main character is a university student, Maison Ikkoku is "slightly more sophisticated" compared to Kimagure Orange Road. Anime News Network (ANN) gave the manga an "A" for its story and an "A−" for its art, stating that the series shows off Takahashi's skill; "with a clear cut and rather simple plot, she is able to concentrate on the characters, using them to drive the story, while at the same time ensuring the proper reader reaction intended for each scene." They remarked that the story focuses on Yusaku and Kyoko's relationship, with the other characters used only "to create conflicts, exposition, and comedic relief."

Commenting on the 2020 English release of the manga, Daryl Surat of Otaku USA wrote "After decades of Maison Ikkoku derivatives, the original hit manga remains as delightful as it was back in the 1980s." He also noted that unlike "every other will-they-won't-they Rumiko Takahashi romantic comedy", this one actually has an ending. Caitlin Moore of ANN called Maison Ikkoku "timeless and universal" and the most grounded and straightforward romance in Takahashi's oeuvre, where, although it is clear from the start who the main couple is and that they will fall in love by the end, it is not clear how that will happen. With Kyoko a widow, she called the manga one of the best portrayals of the slow and messy nature of the grieving process. Although she noted the art as dated, Moore felt it still holds up well with its simple but expressive designs, and that the suburban Tokyo setting gives a timeless feeling. Calling Viz's older translation "punchy, but not super faithful", she called the new one a good balance between faithful to the Japanese and natural-reading English. Moore finished her review with "I have long considered Maison Ikkoku one of the greatest love stories of all time, but it's so much more than that. It's a romance, a comedy, a coming-of-age story, a story of loss and recovery." Right Stuf Inc. called Maison Ikkoku a classic rom-com that has many of the strengths of modern sitcoms and praised the back-and-forth between characters as always hilarious and the romance between Godai and Kyoko as both nuanced and sweet. They described the art as giving the characters "a comedic whimsy", and opined that "good art is never dated, because good art is timeless."

ANN's Allen Divers wrote positive reviews of the anime, saying "The beauty of Maison Ikkoku is the fact that the entire cast feels dynamic enough that each could be the center of an episode without pulling away from the main idea of the series." and called it a must-see for fans of romantic comedies. Melissa Sternenberg of THEM Anime Reviews gave the show a perfect five star rating, calling the development between the two main characters refreshing and praising the supporting cast for reacting to what happens around them. Although she did point out the music and sound effects might seem dated. She finished saying "There may never be 'the greatest anime series of all time,' but I would bet a good amount of money that this series would be on most (respected) anime viewers' top five lists." TV Asahi released two Top 100 Anime lists in 2005; Maison Ikkoku came in 80 on the nationwide survey of multiple age-groups, and 89 on the web poll. A 2019 NHK poll of 210,061 people saw Maison Ikkoku named Takahashi's third best animated work.
