= Urusei Yatsura (1981 TV series) =

Japanese anime television series

- Promotional Fuji TV poster that features the main characters, with Lum, Ataru Moroboshi, and Ten in a lead
- Based on: Urusei Yatsura by Rumiko Takahashi
- Developed by: Takao Koyama; Hizakasu Sou; Kazunori Itō; Michiru Shimada
- Directed by: Mamoru Oshii; Kazuo Yamazaki
- Music by: Fumitaka Anzai; Katsu Hoshi; Shinsuke Kazato; Izumi Kobayashi; Kouji Nishimura
- Country of origin: Japan
- Original language: Japanese
- No. of seasons: 4
- No. of episodes: 194 (Note: Not including episode 193.5, which is a repeat of episode 44) (213 segments)

Production
- Executive producer: Hidenori Taiga
- Producers: Takao Inoue; Tadashi Oka; Yuji Nunokawa; Hiroshi Hasegawa; Makoto Kubo
- Animators: Studio Pierrot (episodes 1–106); Studio Deen (episodes 107–194)
- Editor: Seiji Morita
- Running time: 25 minutes
- Production companies: Kitty Films (Note: Credited as Kitty Enterprises until episode 21.5); Fuji Television

Original release
- Network: Fuji Television
- Release: October 14, 1981 – March 19, 1986

Related
- Urusei Yatsura (2022)

Urusei Yatsura is a Japanese anime television series that aired on Fuji TV from October 14, 1981, to March 19, 1986. Based on the manga series of the same name by Rumiko Takahashi, it was produced by Kitty Films and Fuji TV, and animated by Studio Pierrot (episodes 1–106) and Studio Deen (episodes 107–191). It was licensed in North America by AnimEigo, who released the series English subbed on VHS in October 1992. Their license expired in 2011, and is currently licensed by Discotek Media.

== Production and release ==
Animation production was done by Studio Pierrot for episodes 1–106 before moving to Studio Deen for episodes 107–194. With the exceptions of episodes 10 and 11, the first 21 episodes were composed of two 11-minute segments. Mamoru Oshii served as head director for the first 106 episodes, while the remainder is head directed by Kazuo Yamazaki. Episode 193.5 "Urusei Yatsura Immediate Farewell Special - Shine!! Planet Uru Award" is a repeat of episode 44 "After You've Gone" with a special introduction and best episode countdown before the episode.

=== Broadcast and release ===
Urusei Yatsura aired on Fuji Television and its affiliates from October 14, 1981, to March 19, 1986. On December 10, 1983, the first VHS release of the series was made available in Japan. The series was also released on fifty LaserDiscs. Another VHS release across fifty cassettes began on March 17, 1998, and concluded on April 19, 2000. In 1987, 6,000 LaserDisc box sets of the anime series costing ¥330,000 each were sold out, generating ¥1.98 billion ($13 million) in retail sales. Two DVD box sets of the series were released between December 8, 2000, and March 9, 2001. These were followed by fifty individual volumes between August 24, 2001, and August 23, 2002. To celebrate the 35th anniversary of the anime a new HD transfer was created and released on Blu-ray in Japan. The first Blu-ray box set of the series was released on March 27, 2013, with the fourth box set released on March 26, 2014. To promote the Blu-ray, the anime was rebroadcast in high definition on Kids Station.

During 1992, the series was licensed for a North American release by AnimEigo. Their VHS release began in October of the same year and was among the first anime titles to receive a subtitled North American release. However the release schedule was erratic. An improvisational gag dub of the first and third episodes was broadcast on now-defunct BBC Choice channel on 5/6 August 2000, as part of a Japan TV Weekend block special as "Lum the Invader Girl". AnimEigo later released the series on DVD. The series was available in box set form as well as individual releases. A total of 10 box sets and 50 individual DVDs were released between March 27, 2001, and June 20, 2006. Each DVD and VHS contained Liner notes explaining the cultural references and puns from the series. In February 2011, AnimEigo announced that it would not renew their license to the series and that their DVDs would fall out of print on September 30, 2011. A fan group known as "Lum's Stormtroopers" convinced the San Jose public television station KTEH to broadcast subtitled episodes of the series in 1998. On July 31, 2022, during their panel at Otakon 2022, Discotek Media announced that they licensed the anime series. The first season was released on Blu-ray on April 25, 2023, with the second season released on July 25, 2023, and the third season was released on October 31, 2023. The fourth and final season was released as well on January 30, 2024.

Crunchyroll added the series in Japanese audio with English subtitles on March 28, 2024.

== Music ==
Six opening themes and nine ending themes were used during the series. "Lum's Love Song" (ラムのラブソング, Lum no Love Song) was used as the opening theme for the first 77 episodes. It was replaced by "Dancing Star" for episodes 78 to 106. "Pajama Jama da!" (パジャマ・じゃまだ!) was used for episodes 107 to 127, and "Chance on Love" was used for episodes 128 to 149. The final two opening themes were "Rock the Planet" for episodes 150 to 165 and "Gentlemen, I'm Sorry" (殿方ごめん遊ばせ, Tonogata Gomen Asobase) for the remaining episodes. The first ending theme was "Uchū wa Taihen da!" (宇宙は大ヘンだ) which was used for the first 21 episodes. It was replaced by "Kokorobosoi na" (心細いな) for episodes 22 to 43 and by "Hoshizora Cycling" (星空サイクリング) for episodes 44 to 54 and later 65 to 77. "I, I, You and Ai" was used for episodes 55 to 64, and "Yume wa Love Me More" (夢は Love Me More) was used for episodes 78 to 106. "Koi no Mobius" (恋のメビウス) was used for episodes 107 to 127, and "Open Invitation" was used for episodes 128 to 149. The final two ending themes were "Every Day" for episodes 150 to 165, and "Good Luck" for the remainder of the series.

== Series overview ==
Season (Note: The "seasons" that comprise the episode list correspond to the series' international release outside Japan. In Japan, Urusei Yatsura was aired year-round continuously, with regular preemptions for sporting events and television specials taking place, not split into standard seasonal cycles.)	Episodes	Original run	Series Director	Series Composition	Animation studio	Theme songs	
Season	Episodes	Original run	Series Director	Series Composition	Animation studio	Opening	Ending
1	54	October 14, 1981 − December 22, 1982	Mamoru Oshii	Takao Koyama	Studio Pierrot	"Lum no Love Song" by Yuko Matsutani	"Uchū wa Taihen da!" by Yuko Matsutani
1	54	October 14, 1981 − December 22, 1982	Mamoru Oshii	Kazunori Itō	Studio Pierrot	"Lum no Love Song" by Yuko Matsutani	"Kokorobosoi na" by Helen Sasano
1	54	October 14, 1981 − December 22, 1982	Mamoru Oshii	Kazunori Itō	Studio Pierrot	"Lum no Love Song" by Yuko Matsutani	"Hoshizora Cycling" by Virgin VS
2	52	January 5, 1983 − March 28, 1984	Mamoru Oshii	Kazunori Itō	Studio Pierrot	"Lum no Love Song" by Yuko Matsutani	"I, I, You and Ai" by Izumi Kobayashi
2	52	January 5, 1983 − March 28, 1984	Mamoru Oshii	Kazunori Itō	Studio Pierrot	"Lum no Love Song" by Yuko Matsutani	"Hoshizora Cycling" by Virgin VS
2	52	January 5, 1983 − March 28, 1984	Mamoru Oshii	Kazunori Itō	Studio Pierrot	"Dancing Star" by Izumi Kobayashi	"Yume wa Love Me More" by Izumi Kobayashi
3	43	April 11, 1984 − March 27, 1985	Kazuo Yamazaki	Michiru Shimada	Studio Deen	"Pajama Jama da!" by Kanako Narikiyo	"Koi no Mobius" by Rittsu
3	43	April 11, 1984 − March 27, 1985	Kazuo Yamazaki	Michiru Shimada	Studio Deen	"Chance on Love" by Cindy	"Open Invitation" by Cindy
4	45	April 3, 1985 − March 19, 1986	Kazuo Yamazaki	Michiru Shimada	Studio Deen	"Rock the Planet" by Steffanie Borges	"Every Day" by Steffanie Borges
4	45	April 3, 1985 − March 19, 1986	Kazuo Yamazaki	Michiru Shimada	Studio Deen	"Tonogata Gomen Asobase" by Shoko Minami	"Good Luck" by Shoko Minami

== Episodes ==
=== Season 1 (1981–82) ===
No. overall	No. in season	Title	Directed by	Written by	Animation directed by	Original release date	Prod. code	Japanese viewers (millions)
1	1	"I'm Lum-chan the Notorious!"; Transliteration: "Uwasa no Ramu-chan Datcha!" (Japanese: うわさのラムちゃんだっちゃ！)	Mamoru Oshii	Hiroyuki Hoshiyama	Asami Endo	October 14, 1981	101	17.8
1	1	"It's Raining Oil All Over Town"; Transliteration: "Machi ni Sekiyu no Ame ga Furu" (Japanese: 町に石油の雨がふる)	Mamoru Oshii	Hiroyuki Hoshiyama	Asami Endo	October 14, 1981	102	17.8
Ataru is kidnapped by men dressed in black and escorted to his house where he meets an Oni named Mr. Invader, who comes from beyond the Galaxy to take over Earth. One of the men in black explains to Ataru that he has been randomly selected from Earth's population to duel against the alien: winning the duel is the only chance to stop the alien invasion. Ataru refuses despite the man in black is begging him to save the Earth. Suddenly, a giant spaceship appears and a lightning hits Moroboshi's house. A sexy girl named Lum appears after the flash: she's going to be Ataru's opponent. Mr. Invader says that Ataru would win if he can grab Lum by her horns. Excited by the opportunity to touch her, Ataru changes his mind and agrees to take part in the duel. Lum says she is not easy to catch though. The next day, Ataru and Lum are both going to play a game of tag. When the game starts, Ataru tries to grab Lum's body but he fails as Lum can fly. Ataru is about to catch Lum during multiple attempts but he fails every time. Later on, TV news informs its viewers there is only one more day left to catch Lum; if Ataru fails he and his family will be lynched. Later that night, Shinobu says to Ataru that she would marry him if he wins. On the final day, Ataru uses a suction cup gun to get Lum's bra. While Lum is trying to get her bra back, Ataru grabs her by the horns. Ataru's delighted that this means he can finally marry Shinobu, but Lum, misunderstanding his claim, thinks Ataru wants to marry her instead, angering Shinobu. Taking place a week after the previous episode, a group of Tomobiki High School boys (later known as Lum's Stormtroopers) want Lum to come back to Earth, and capture Ataru (who also failed in his attempt to flee the country). These knuckleheads want to summon Lum back to Earth, and end up summoning an alien taxi driver. Too bad his prices are absolutely massive, so he decides to claim his fee by taking every drop of oil on Earth. Now without any gasoline or heat, the entire populace of Earth wants Ataru's head on a platter. Can Lum save the day? Sure, if Ataru can swallow his pride and ask her for help.
2	2	"Mail from Space - Ten-chan Arrives!"; Transliteration: "Uchū Yūbin - Ten-chan Tōchaku!" (Japanese: 宇宙ゆうびん テンちゃん到着！)	Directed by : Masuji Harada; Storyboarded by : Yuzo Aoki	Shusuke Kaneko	Yuji Yatabe	October 21, 1981	103	18.6
2	2	"Mrs. Swallow and Mrs. Penguin"; Transliteration: "Tsubame-san to Pengin-san" (Japanese: つばめさんとペンギンさん)	Tamiko Kojima	Shusuke Kaneko	Asami Endo	October 21, 1981	104	18.6
During a thunderstorm, a peach falls from the sky in form of a lightning bolt and is delivered to the Moroboshi family. Ataru and his mom both crack open the peach together and inside it is Lum's cousin, Ten. Lum is thrilled that her little cousin dropped in for a visit, but Ten can't stand Ataru, as he thought Lum found a good husband, and the feeling is mutual. Ataru tries to kick Ten out of the house, only for the house to explode after Ten fires the propane. Ten feeds alien candy to a swallow, making it grow massively in size. And all further attempts to circumvent this problem only invite bigger disasters.
3	3	"The Coming of Rei the Handsome Shapechanger!"; Transliteration: "Henshin Bidan Rei ga Kita!" (Japanese: 変身美男レイが来た)	Keiji Hayakawa	Ichirô Izumi	Hayao Node	October 28, 1981	105	19.0
3	3	"Die Dreamy-Man!"; Transliteration: "Kutabare Iro-Otoko!" (Japanese: くたばれイロ男！)	Mamoru Oshii	Ichirô Izumi	Asami Endo	October 28, 1981	106	19.0
Lum's ex-fiancé, Rei, a handsome yet laconic and gluttonous Oni with an unusual transformational ability, arrives on earth to win her back but succeeds only in winning the attention of every other woman on Earth (including Ataru's mother). While visiting a gyūdon, Ataru, Megane, Chibi and Kakugari encounter a distraught Rei unable to shirk his obsession towards Lum.
4	4	"Kintaro from the Autumn Sky!"; Transliteration: "Aki no Sora Kara Kintarō!" (Japanese: 秋の空から金太郎！)	Tamiko Kojima	Yū Yamamoto	Hayao Node	November 4, 1981	107	19.8
4	4	"Gonna Live Like a Man!"; Transliteration: "Takumashiku Ikirun yā!" (Japanese: たくましく生きるんやっ)	Masuji Harada	Yū Yamamoto	Yuji Yatabe	November 4, 1981	108	19.8
The cast meets Kintaro, the legendary mighty boy who is lost on earth. Lured by the attractiveness of Kintaro's teacher, Ataru convinces Kintaro - with his alien classmates in tow - to visit Earth on a field trip.
5	5	"Sakura - Raving Beauty of Mystery"; Transliteration: "Nazo no Oiroke Bijo - Sakura" (Japanese: 謎のお色気美女 サクラ)	Mamoru Oshii	Yū Yamamoto	Hayao Node	November 18, 1981	109	22.0
5	5	"Virus in Distress"; Transliteration: "Nayameru Uirusu" (Japanese: 悩めるウィルス)	Motosuke Takahashi	Yū Yamamoto	Asami Endo	November 18, 1981	110	22.0
Ataru runs away from home, unable to stand the pressure of living with Lum. Unfortunately, he subsequently runs into Sakura, a gorgeous-but-sickly woman, and is tasked with returning her to a local temple to exorcise the demons possessing her. Sakura finds employment in Ataru's school as the school nurse, yet Ataru is remarkably the only male student to not express any lustful interest in her, leading Sakura and Lum to suspect a possession.
6	6	"Black Hole Love Triangle"; Transliteration: "Koi no Sankaku Burakku Hōru" (Japanese: 恋の三角ブラックホール)	Masuji Harada	Takao Koyama	Yuji Yatabe	November 25, 1981	111	17.3
6	6	"It's a Lovesick Little Demon!"; Transliteration: "Horehore Ko Akuma Dakkya!" (Japanese: ホレホレ小悪魔だっきゃ！)	Keiji Hayakawa	Hiroyuki Hoshiyama	Hayao Node	November 25, 1981	112	17.3
Lum blocks Ataru and Shinobu's phone call using equipment in her UFO, inadvertently creating a black hole that causes aircraft to vanish, leaving Ataru to stop her and reassert his relationship with Shinobu against undesirably high stakes. Ataru puts two mirrors together on Friday the 13th and accidentally makes a clingy, lecherous demon appear from another dimension, who immediately falls for both Shinobu and Ataru's mother.
7	7	"Electric Shocks Scare Me!"; Transliteration: "Dengeki Shokku ga Kowai!" (Japanese: 電撃ショックがこわい！)	Tamiko Kojima	Akira Nakahara	Asami Endo	December 2, 1981	113	22.7
7	7	"Voodoo Dolls of Vengeance"; Transliteration: "Nenriki Urami no Ayatsuri Ningyō" (Japanese: 念力ウラミのあやつり人形)	Tamiko Kojima	Takao Koyama	Hayao Node	December 2, 1981	114	22.7
Cherry gives Ataru some magical yellow ribbons which, when tied on Lum's horns, render her unable to fire electric shocks. Lum makes a voodoo doll of Shinobu, and Ataru tries to stop her from using it to hurt Shinobu.
8	8	"Neptune is Beyond My Closet"; Transliteration: "Oshi-ire no Mukō wa Kaiōsei" (Japanese: おし入れの向うは海王星)	Mamoru Oshii	Yuji Amemiya	Hayao Node	December 9, 1981	115	17.7
8	8	"That Crazy Age of the Dinosaurs"; Transliteration: "Hachamecha Kyōryū Jidai" (Japanese: ハチャメチャ恐竜時代)	Keiji Hayakawa	Yū Yamamoto	Asami Endo	December 9, 1981	116	17.7
The gang discovers a portal to the ice-covered planet Neptune in Ataru's closet and meet Lum's aloof and elegant high school friend, Oyuki, the queen of Neptune. An accident sends Lum, Ataru, Ten and Kintaro back to the time of the dinosaurs.
9	9	"Princess Kurama, Sleeping Beauty"; Transliteration: "Nemureru Bijo Kurama Hime" (Japanese: 眠れる美女クラマ姫)	Keiji Hayakawa	Akira Nakahara	Asami Endo	December 16, 1981	117	22.4
9	9	"Athletics in Women's Hell!"; Transliteration: "Asurechikku Onna Jigoku!" (Japanese: アスレチック女地獄！)	Tameo Kohanawa	Akira Nakahara	Yuji Yatabe	December 16, 1981	118	22.4
Having been awakened from her long sleep by Ataru's kiss, Kurama, a temperamental crow demon, tries her best to reform him by making him undergo strenuous training to be her husband and trying to cure his lechery. Still trying to cure Ataru's lechery, Kurama uses a dimensional door where Ataru faces hostile versions of the girls he loves.
10	10	"Pitter Patter Christmas Eve"; Transliteration: "Toki Meki no Seiya" (Japanese: ときめきの聖夜)	Mamoru Oshii	Yū Yamamoto	Asami Endo	December 23, 1981	119	23.2
10	10	"Pitter Patter Christmas Eve"; Transliteration: "Toki Meki no Seiya" (Japanese: ときめきの聖夜)	Mamoru Oshii	Yū Yamamoto	Asami Endo	December 23, 1981	120	23.2
Lum's Stormtroopers, outraged by Ataru's dismissal of Lum's affection, attempt to stage a humiliating false date for Ataru, a scheme ultimately thwarted by Lum.
11	11	"Ataru Genji Goes to the Heian Capital"; Transliteration: "Ataru Genji Heian Kyō ni Yuku" (Japanese: あたる源氏平安京にゆく)	Tamiko Kojima	Shusuke Kaneko	Hayao Node	January 6, 1982	121	24.7
11	11	"Ataru Genji Goes to the Heian Capital"; Transliteration: "Ataru Genji Heian Kyō ni Yuku" (Japanese: あたる源氏平安京にゆく)	Tamiko Kojima	Shusuke Kaneko	Hayao Node	January 6, 1982	122	24.7
In an episode that parodies The Tale of Genji, Shutaro Mendou ("soon to become a regular character on this series") tells a tale about ancient Japan featuring the normal cast in a slightly different alien invasion story. This time the aliens all look like a bunch of odd barbarians, except for a pretty girl and her young boy cousin.
12	12	"Battle Royal of Love"; Transliteration: "Koi no Batoru Roiyaru" (Japanese: 恋のバトルロイヤル)	Keiji Hayakawa	Takao Koyama	Asami Endo	January 13, 1982	123	20.0
12	12	"Father You Were Strong"; Transliteration: "Chichi yo Anata wa Tsuyokatta" (Japanese: 父よあなたは強かった)	Motosuke Takahashi	Takao Koyama	Asami Endo	January 13, 1982	124	20.0
Lum, Ataru and the gang go out to a disco, and chaos ensues when Sakura's boyfriend Tsubame starts to demonstrate his magic abilities. Kurama takes Ataru back in time to a fictionalized analogue of feudal Japan in a desperate attempt to remodel Ataru's lecherous personality to mirror that of her aloof and 'chivalrous' father, whom she idolizes as her 'ideal man'.
13	13	"Hawaiian Swimsuit Thief"; Transliteration: "Hawaian Mizugi Dorobō" (Japanese: ハワイアン水着ドロボウ)	Masuji Harada	Hiroyuki Hoshiyama	Yuji Yatabe	January 20, 1982	125	22.1
13	13	"Full Course From Hell"; Transliteration: "Jigoku no Furu Kōsu" (Japanese: 地獄のフルコース)	Tamiko Kojima	Hiroyuki Hoshiyama	Hayao Node	January 20, 1982	126	22.1
The girls' swimsuits are stolen during a Hawaiian vacation, and everyone suspects Cherry. Sakura, Ataru, and Cherry compete in an eating contest at a restaurant near their resort, during which the immensity of Sakura's culinary capacity is brought to the forefront.
14	14	"Mendo Brings Trouble!"; Transliteration: "Mendō wa Toraburu to Tomo ni!" (Japanese: 面堂はトラブルとともに！)	Mamoru Oshii	Yū Yamamoto	Asami Endo	January 27, 1982	127	20.4
14	14	"Constellation is Spinning"; Transliteration: "Seiza wa Meguru" (Japanese: 星座はめぐる)	Tameo Kohanawa	Yū Yamamoto	Yuji Yatabe	January 27, 1982	128	20.4
Shutaro Mendo, the adolescent heir to the wealthiest corporation in Japan, enrols at Tomobiki High and proceeds to woo every girl (with the notable exception of Lum) in Class 2B with his suave and 'chivalrous' demeanor, much to Ataru's ire. After a computer calculates Lum's perfect matchmade partner to be Shutaro instead of Ataru, she employs an interactive horoscope-based 'personality test' to determine the 'more eligible' partner.
15	15	"The Great Spring War"; Transliteration: "Setsubun Dai Sensō" (Japanese: せつぶん大戦争)	Keiji Hayakawa	Takao Koyama	Hayao Node	February 3, 1982	129	22.1
15	15	"The Benten Gang's Return Match"; Transliteration: "Benten Gundan no Ritān Matchi" (Japanese: 弁天軍団リターンマッチ)	Keiji Hayakawa	Takao Koyama	Asami Endo	February 3, 1982	130	22.1
Lum brings Ataru against his will to her home planet to take part in a Setsubun ball-throwing competition between her race the Oni and the 'Cosmic Gods', represented by the headstrong Benten, whom Ataru, to the detriment of the competition, immediately falls for. Benten and her motorcycle gang come to Earth and end up in a fight with Lum.
16	16	"Ah Lone Teacher!"; Transliteration: "Ā Kojin Kyōju" (Japanese: あゝ個人教授！)	Tamiko Kojima	Shusuke Kaneko	Asami Endo	February 10, 1982	131	23.1
16	16	"Terrifying Visiting Day"; Transliteration: "Senritsu no Sankan Bi" (Japanese: 戦りつの参観日)	Motosuke Takahashi	Shusuke Kaneko	Asami Endo	February 10, 1982	132	23.1
A new teacher, Sanjuro Kuribayashi, arrives at Tomobiki High and has been tasked with bringing order to Ataru's class, only to develop an infatuation towards Lum (and a resultant dislike of Ataru's relationship with her). During parents' visiting day, a misunderstanding between Mrs. Mendo and Lum's mother Mrs. Invader rapidly escalates into potential warfare, which Ataru's mother is tasked with settling.
17	17	"The Fourth Dimension Camera"; Transliteration: "Yojigen Kamera" (Japanese: 四次元カメラ)	Masuji Harada	Hiroyuki Hoshiyama	Yuji Yatabe	February 24, 1982	133	21.9
17	17	"Demonic Running"; Transliteration: "Ma no Ranningu" (Japanese: 魔のランニング)	Mamoru Oshii	Hiroyuki Hoshiyama	Hayao Node	February 24, 1982	134	21.9
Shutaro brings in an antique camera to Tomobiki High that, upon taking a photo of Ataru, transports him to a different dimension. Ataru suddenly becomes amazingly lucky for a day and turns out to have accidentally made a pact with a devil.
18	18	"Girls' Day! Introducing Ran-chan"; Transliteration: "Hina Matsuri! Ran-chan Tōjō" (Japanese: ひな祭り！ランちゃん登場)	Mamoru Oshii	Yū Yamamoto	Hayao Node	March 3, 1982	137	23.0
18	18	"Ran-chan's Invitation"; Transliteration: "Ran-chan no Goshōtai" (Japanese: ランちゃんの御招待)	Keiji Hayakawa	Yū Yamamoto	Asami Endo	March 3, 1982	138	23.0
Lums' childhood friend Ran arrives and attempts to suck out Ataru's youth to exact 'revenge' upon Lum for romantically 'stealing' her object of affection Rei. Ran makes a duplicate of Ataru to switch it with the real one so that she could suck up his youth.
19	19	"The Tearful Diary of Tomorrow"; Transliteration: "Namida no Ashita Nikki" (Japanese: 涙のあした日記)	Tamiko Kojima	Akira Nakahara	Hayao Node	March 10, 1982	135	16.5
19	19	"Whose Kid Is This?"; Transliteration: "Kono Ko wa Dāre?" (Japanese: この子はだあれ？)	Keiji Hayakawa	Akira Nakahara	Asami Endo	March 10, 1982	136	16.5
Lum time travels to the next day and brings back Ataru's diary, enabling her to anticipate the events of Ataru's day in advance. Mendou finds an alien resembling an abandoned infant in his locker and is tasked with the increasingly ludicrous proportions of care it requires.
20	20	"Sleepy Serene Springtime Classroom"; Transliteration: "Haru Urara Inemuri Kyōshitsu" (Japanese: 春うらら居眠り教室)	Mamoru Oshii	Ichirô Izumi	Asami Endo	March 17, 1982	139	20.5
20	20	"Peach Blossom Song Contest"; Transliteration: "Momo no Hana Uta Gassen" (Japanese: 桃の花歌合戦)	Keiji Hayakawa	Ichirô Izumi	Asami Endo	March 17, 1982	140	20.5
The gang meet Shunmin, a spirit-in-training whose assignment is to put everyone in Ataru's class to sleep. Mendou, Ataru, Cherry, Sakura, Shinobu, Ran, Lum, and Ten go on a peach blossom viewing picnic.
21	21	"Duel! Ataru vs Ataru"; Transliteration: "Kettō! Ataru tai Ataru" (Japanese: 決斗！あたるvsあたる)	Tamiko Kojima	Akira Nakahara	Hayao Node	March 24, 1982	141	22.3
21	21	"Wake up to a Nightmare"; Transliteration: "Mezamereba Akumu" (Japanese: 目ざめれば悪夢)	Tamiko Kojima	Akira Nakahara	Asami Endo	March 24, 1982	142	22.3
After eating a lollipop that Lum makes for him and a bun Cherry intended to bury as it is evil, Ataru splits into two beings, one representative of his more chivalrous and moral traits and the other an abstraction of his impulsivity and lechery. As Ataru sleeps in class after losing to Lum in a gambling many times the night before, he becomes trapped in a sequence of nightmare ultimately rectified by the dream lord Mujaki and his nightmare-devouring baku accomplice.
SP1	21.5	"Urusei Yatsura All-Star Bash"; Transliteration: "Urusei Yatsura ōru stā daishingeki" (Japanese: うる星やつら オールスタア大進撃)	Mamoru Oshii, etc	Kazunori Itō, etc	Asami Endo, etc	March 31, 1982	–	N/A
SP1	21.5	"Grade School Excursion! Run For It!"; Transliteration: "Shūgaku Ryokō! kunoichi yo hashire" (Japanese: 修学旅行！くの一よ走れ)	Keiji Hayakawa	Yū Yamamoto	Hayao Node	March 31, 1982	–	N/A
A clipshow which is a recap of the series so far. Mrs. Moroboshi is the narrator. During a field trip about the capital of Nara, Ataru meets a ninja named Kaede, who wishes to have a better life, as her grandma makes her miserable.
22	22	"Great Space Matchmaking Operation"; Transliteration: "Supēsu Omiai Dai Sakusen" (Japanese: スペースお見合い大作戦)	Mamoru Oshii	Masaki Tsuji	Asami Endo	April 7, 1982	201	17.8
Lum returns to her home planet unaware that her father is throwing her a matchmaking party. Through Freudian slip, Ten alerts a disheartened Ataru to the event, leading him to embark on an intergalactic mission to retrieve Lum.
23	23	"Big Springtime Picnic Uproar!"; Transliteration: "Haru Ranman Pikunikku Daisōdō!" (Japanese: 春らんまんピクニック大騒動！)	Directed by : Masuji Harada & Sachihiko Kawai; Storyboarded by : Mamoru Oshii & Sachihiko Kawai	Yū Yamamoto	Hayao Node & Yuji Yatabe	April 14, 1982	202	N/A
During a Spring class field trip, Ataru journeys to an underwater kingdom and then he, Lum, Shinobu and Mendou get lost in a cave (exposing Mendou's legendary fear of the dark).
24	24	"Beware of Earmuffs!"; Transliteration: "Iyāmaffuru ni Goyōjin!" (Japanese: イヤーマッフルに御用心！)	Tamiko Kojima	Masaki Tsuji	Asami Endo	April 21, 1982	203	N/A
Ataru and Ten switch bodies after wearing earmuffs sold by a shady alien vendor.
25	25	"Fly Imo-chan!"; Transliteration: "Tobe yo Imo-chan!" (Japanese: 翔べよイモちゃん！)	Directed by : Keiji Hayakawa; Storyboarded by : Shunji Ôga	Yū Yamamoto	Hayao Node	April 28, 1982	204	N/A
Owing to its monstrous appetite, the Stormtroopers donate a large, ungainly 'caterpillar', 'Imo', to Ataru, who proceeds to protect it from the wrath of his classmates following the disappearance of their lunches.
26	26	"Ten-chan's Love"; Transliteration: "Ten-chan no Koi" (Japanese: テンちゃんの恋)	Directed by : Mamoru Oshii; Storyboarded by : Mizuho Nishikubo	So Hisakazu & Kazunori Itō	Yuichi Endo	May 5, 1982	205	N/A
Ten develops an unrequited crush on Sakura and, with Kintaro's aid, attempts to 'win her heart' via a date, sparking Ataru's ire.
27	27	"What a Dracula"; Transliteration: "Tonda Dorakyura" (Japanese: 翔んだドラキュラ)	Directed by : Keiji Hayakawa; Storyboarded by : Kazufumi Nomura	So Hisakazu & Kazunori Itō	Noboru Furuse	May 12, 1982	206	N/A
A washed-up and incompetent Count Dracula, aspiring to drain the blood of a beauteous young maiden, targets Lum, only to be obstructed by his own ineptitude.
28	28	"Lum's Education Lecture Course for Boys"; Transliteration: "Ramu-chan no Otoko no Ko Kyōiku Kōza" (Japanese: ラムちゃんの男のコ教育講座)	Directed by : Tamiko Kojima; Storyboarded by : Motosuke Takahashi	Masaki Tsuji	Asami Endo	May 19, 1982	207	N/A
Lum travels back in time in order to meet a younger Ataru and cure his libido.
29	29	"From the Gardenia with Love"; Transliteration: "Kuchinashi Yori Ai wo Komete" (Japanese: クチナシより愛をこめて)	Keiji Hayakawa	Kazunori Itō	Asami Endo	May 26, 1982	208	N/A
Ataru and Ten compete for the attention of the pretty female proprietor of a flower shop through buying a gardenia, which, upon Ten attempting to accelerate its growth through use of alien fertilizer, balloons to gigantic proportions.
30	30	"A Beautiful Girl Brings Rain"; Transliteration: "Bishōjo wa Ame to Tomo ni" (Japanese: 美少女は雨とともに)	Tamiko Kojima	Kazunori Itō	Asami Endo	June 2, 1982	209	N/A
Ataru meets Tsuyuko, a cursed girl who seems to bring torrential rain wherever she goes, and agrees to date her to alleviate her of the curse.
31	31	"Gimme Back My Horn!"; Transliteration: "Wai no Tsuno wo Kaeshitekure!" (Japanese: わいのツノを返してくれ！)	Kazuo Yamazaki	Yū Yamamoto	Hayao Node	June 9, 1982	210	N/A
Ten's horn falls off during a fight with Ataru, leaving him weakened and unable to breathe fire. Ataru wastes no time in taking advantage of the situation, while Ran, upon discovered Ten's disembodied horn, assumes the horn to be Lum's and subsequently plots to exploit Lum's 'weakened' state to exact 'revenge'.
32	32	"Shock Library - Quiet Please!"; Transliteration: "Dokkiri Toshokan - Oshizuka ni!" (Japanese: ドッキリ図書館 お静かに！)	Keiji Hayakawa	Yukiyoshi Ohashi	Asami Endo	June 16, 1982	211	N/A
Chaos ensues at the library after the characters in the books start coming to life. Wendy Darling (from J.M. Barrie's Peter Pan novel) enlists Ataru and Lum's help in restoring order.
33	33	"Teacher Hanawa Arrives! It's the Youth"; Transliteration: "Hanawa Sensei Tōjō! Kore ga Seishun da ne" (Japanese: 花和先生登場！これが青春だね)	Directed by : Mamoru Oshii; Storyboarded by : Shunji Oga	Kazunori Itō	Hayao Node	June 23, 1982	212	N/A
Mr. Hanawa, a naively righteous young teacher, finds employment in Ataru's school simultaneous with Lum's enrolment as a student.
34	34	"Goblin in Distress - Wonderful People"; Transliteration: "Kanashiki Yōkai - Hito Koishikute" (Japanese: 悲しき妖怪 人恋しくて)	Tamiko Kojima	Tadashi Fukui	Asami Endo	June 30, 1982	213	N/A
A cordial goblin is displaced from his home in a Mendou Conglomerate-owned resort pool, thus seeking refuge in Ataru's bathtub.
35	35	"Darling Had It This Time!"; Transliteration: "Dārin Zettai Zetsumei!" (Japanese: ダーリン絶体絶命！)	Kazuo Yamazaki	Kazunori Itō	Kazuo Yamazaki	July 14, 1982	214	N/A
Remembering how Lum always got her in trouble when they were younger, Ran devises a new scheme to suck away Ataru's youth.
36	36	"Rei Returns! The Big Study Hall Uproar!!"; Transliteration: "Rei Fukkatsu! Jishū Dai Sōdō!!" (Japanese: レイ復活！自習大騒動！！)	Mamoru Oshii	Kazunori Itō	Hayao Node	July 21, 1982	215	N/A
Rei appears and causes an uproar by eating everyone's lunch, and Ran tries her best to win him back.
37	37	"The Coming of The Phantom Red Mantle!"; Transliteration: "Kaijin Aka Manto Arawaru!" (Japanese: 怪人赤マントあらわる！)	Keiji Hayakawa	Kazunori Itō	Asami Endo	July 28, 1982	216	N/A
On an evening disco dance held by the students at Tomobiki High School during summer break, Class 2B's teacher, Onsen-Mark, warns the students of a demonic and enigmatic man known as the 'Red Mantle' notorious for the abduction of one of Onsen's own peers. Upon the night of the dance, however, the Mantle himself is revealed to be an overweight and incompetent has-been, obstructing his 'schemes'.
38	38	"Steal Darling! Copy Operation!!"; Transliteration: "Dārin wo Ubae! Kopī Sakusen!!" (Japanese: ダーリンを奪え！コピー作戦！！)	Directed by : Tamiko Kojima; Storyboarded by : Motosuke Takahashi	Tadashi Fukui	Asami Endo	August 4, 1982	217	N/A
Lum tries to make copies of Ataru in order to protect him from Ran's vengeance, to disastrous results.
39	39	"Thrilling Summer Date"; Transliteration: "Dokidoki Samā Dēto" (Japanese: どきどきサマーデート)	Directed by : Mamoru Oshii; Storyboarded by : Mitsugu Kanzaki	Hiroyuki Hoshiyama	Hayao Node	August 11, 1982	218	N/A
Lum and Ataru go on their first date together after Lum watches a television program that makes her realize her relationship with Ataru is abnormal. Ataru, although hesitant at first, shows that he does actually have feelings for Lum, but feels uncomfortable expressing them.
40	40	"So long Byebye Summer Days"; Transliteration: "Sayonara Baibai Natsu no Hibi" (Japanese: さよならバイバイ夏の日々)	Directed by : Keiji Hayakawa; Storyboarded by : Mitsugu Kanzaki	Yukiyoshi Ohashi	Hayao Node	August 18, 1982	219	N/A
Lum, Ataru, Shinobu and Mendo spend their summer vacation at the seaside. First they provoke the wrath of a watermelon god, then they are visited by a crying yōkai.
41	41	"Panic in Typhoon!"; Transliteration: "Panikku in Taifū!" (Japanese: パニックイン台風！)	Keiji Hayakawa	Kazunori Itō	Asami Endo	September 1, 1982	220	N/A
A typhoon strikes Tomobiki and floods the Moroboshi household, but Lum has some inventive ways of helping her Darling and his parents cope with the flood waters.
42	42	"Drunkard's Boogie"; Transliteration: "Yopparai Bugi" (Japanese: 酔っぱらいブギ)	Tamiko Kojima	Tomoko Konparu	Asami Endo	September 8, 1982	221	N/A
Lum and Ten get drunk from eating umeboshi, and Lum begins flying around terrorizing Ataru's classmates in order to get more umeboshi.
43	43	"The Terror of Meow"; Transliteration: "Nyaon no Kyōfu" (Japanese: ニャオンの恐怖)	Mamoru Oshii	Mamoru Oshii	Hayao Node	September 22, 1982	222	N/A
During one of the cats' mating season, Ataru, Lum and Ten meet a beautiful female cat-like humanoid named Misuzu (voiced by Eiko Masuyama)
44 193.5	44	"After You've Gone"; Transliteration: "Kimi Sarishi Nochi" (Japanese: 君去りし後)	Directed by : Junji Nishimura; Storyboarded by : Kazuo Yamazaki	Kazunori Itō	Kazuo Yamazaki	October 13, 1982	301	N/A
44 193.5	44	"After You've Gone"; Transliteration: "Kimi Sarishi Nochi" (Japanese: 君去りし後)	Directed by : Junji Nishimura; Storyboarded by : Kazuo Yamazaki	Kazunori Itō	Kazuo Yamazaki	October 13, 1982	1129	N/A
Lum's Stormtroopers throw Lum a party, but Ataru spoils it by yelling at Lum and accusing her of ruining his life. Lum leaves for her home planet, and when she doesn't return, Ataru, believing she has gone for good, begins to miss her and tearfully wishes she would return. However, it turns out Lum merely left to renew her passport. Note: Episode 193.5 ("Immediate Farewell Special – Shine!! Planet Uru Awards" ("Urusei Yatsura Owakare Chokuzen Supesharu – Kagayake!! Urusei Taishō", うる星やつらお別れ直前スペシャル — 輝け！！うる星大賞)), originally airing on March 12, 1986, is a repeat of this episode with a special introduction and a best episode countdown before the episode.
45	45	"Lum-chan's Class Reunion"; Transliteration: "Ramu-chan no Kurasu Kai" (Japanese: ラムちゃんのクラス会)	Directed by : Tamiko Kojima; Storyboarded by : Motosuke Takahashi	Kazunori Itō	Asami Endo	October 20, 1982	302	N/A
Lum's friends from outer space plan a surprise class-reunion party for her, but an unaware Lum can't understand why her friends are avoiding her and is hurt.
46	46	"Those Buy-Eaters Gather Round!"; Transliteration: "Kai-Gui Surumono Yottoide!" (Japanese: 買い食いするものよっといで！)	Keiji Hayakawa	Kazunori Itō	Hayao Node	October 27, 1982	303	N/A
Lum, Ataru, Shinobu and the rest of the Tomobiki student body - except for Mendo and his small gang of "good kids" - fight a new school rule which forbids students to leave the campus to eat lunch at fast-food joints.
47	47	"Terror! The Deserted Fossil Grounds Mystery"; Transliteration: "Senritsu! Kaseki no Hekichi no Nazo" (Japanese: 戦りつ！化石のへき地の謎)	Directed by : Takashi Ano; Storyboarded by : Mitsugu Kanzaki	Kazunori Itō	Asami Endo	November 3, 1982	304	N/A
Ataru, Lum, Mendo, Shinobu, and Jariten all go on a picnic to a remote part of Japan which has some fossils. A group of archaeologists are also exploring this area and using a lot of fancy tricks to make the exploration seem more dramatic than it is.
48	48	"Princess Kurama - A New Challenge!"; Transliteration: "Kurama Hime - Arata Naru Chōsen!" (Japanese: クラマ姫 新たなる挑戦！)	Tamiko Kojima	Kazunori Itō	Asami Endo	November 10, 1982	305	N/A
A slumbering Kurama is discovered and re-awakened (much to her ire) by Ataru; upon encountering Mendou, Kurama immediately targets him as an 'eligible' husband despite her technical (as per Tengu law) betrothal to Ataru.
49	49	"The Terrifying Cavity Wars!"; Transliteration: "Kyofu no Mushiba Uōzu!" (Japanese: 恐怖のムシ歯WARS！)	Keiji Hayakawa	Mamoru Oshii	Hayao Node	November 17, 1982	306	N/A
Ten has gotten cavities. However, these cavities can be cured by biting 10 people and spreading the cavities to others. To relieve himself, he pays Ataru's class a visit.
50	50	"The Mendo Siblings!"; Transliteration: "Za Mendō Kyōdai!" (Japanese: ザ・面堂兄妹！)	Directed by : Keiji Hayakawa; Storyboarded by : Tori Nano	Kazunori Itō	Asami Endo	November 24, 1982	307	N/A
Ataru gets to meet Mendō's stunning-yet-manipulative younger sister, Ryōko, who offers him to visit her for a Romeo and Juliet rendezvous, but Mendō and Lum won't allow it.
51	51	"A Cat with a Grudge on the Stairs"; Transliteration: "Kaidan ni Neko ga Onnen" (Japanese: 階段に猫がおんねん)	Directed by : Junji Nishimura; Storyboarded by : Kazuo Yamazaki	Kazunori Itō	Kazuo Yamazaki	December 1, 1982	308	N/A
After encountering Kotatsu-Neko, the silent, monolithic spirit of a kotatsu-loving cat, in a derelict district of Tomobiki one winter afternoon, Ten shelters the spectre in the Moroboshi household to the result of obstructing the stairway, thereby barricading Ataru upstairs with an amorous Lum and inciting a feud between the Moroboshi parents.
52	52	"Can a Raccoon Repay a Favor!?"; Transliteration: "Tanuki wa Ongaeshi Dekiru ka!?" (Japanese: タヌキは恩返しできるか！？)	Directed by : Mamoru Oshii; Storyboarded by : Motosuke Takahashi	Hiroyuki Hoshiyama	Asami Endo	December 8, 1982	309	N/A
Ataru helps a wounded bird who transforms itself into a raccoon and moves in to repay the service to Ataru.
53	53	"The Suicide Subspace Parttime Job"; Transliteration: "Kesshi no Akūkan Arubaito" (Japanese: 決死の亜空間アルバイト)	Keiji Hayakawa	Kazunori Itō	Hayao Node	December 15, 1982	310	N/A
Ataru finds the perfect part-time job - a washing attendant at a bathhouse - which he excitedly anticipates as being an opportunity to ogle and grope naked women. However, it doesn't turn out the way he expected.
54	54	"The Big Year-End Party that Lum-chan Organized!"; Transliteration: "Ramu-chan Shusai Dai Bō-Nen Kai!" (Japanese: ラムちゃん主催大忘年会！)	Keiji Hayakawa	Kazunori Itō	Asami Endo	December 22, 1982	311	N/A
When Lum plans the class's end-of-year party, Ataru explains that New Year's is when you forget who you are. He's a bit worried she took it a bit literally...

=== Season 2 (1983–84) ===
No. overall	No. in season	Title	Directed by	Written by	Animation directed by	Original release date	Prod. code
55	1	"Badboy Musashi - A Success Story"; Transliteration: "Damekko Musashi Fū Un Roku" (Japanese: ダメッコ武蔵 風雲録)	Directed by : Junji Nishimura; Storyboarded by : Tori Nano	Kazunori Itō	Hayao Node	January 5, 1983	401
The normal cast is again put into an ancient Japanese story with Ataru as a food thief with Onsen-Mark and Cherry as his occasional companions.
56	2	"We'll Risk Our Lives During Classtime!"; Transliteration: "Inochi Kake Masu Jugyōchū!" (Japanese: 命かけます授業中！)	Directed by : Keiji Hayakawa; Storyboarded by : Mitsugu Kanzaki	Kazunori Itō	Asami Endo	January 12, 1983	402
After he's pelted by snowballs by Ataru and his friends, Ten plans revenge on Ataru during class after Onsen-Mark threatens the class should any of them make noise.
57	3	"Domestic Quarrel – To Eat or Be Eaten?!"; Transliteration: "Fūfugenka - Kū ka Kuwareru ka!?" (Japanese: 夫婦げんか 食うか食われるか！？)	Directed by : Junji Nishimura; Storyboarded by : Kazuo Yamazaki	Kazunori Itō	Kazuo Yamazaki	January 26, 1983	403
Lum's mother boots father out of the house, so he comes to stay with Lum.
58	4	"Steal the Kiss of Miss Snow Queen!"; Transliteration: "Misu Yuki no Jō Kissu wo Ubae!" (Japanese: ミス雪の女王キッスを奪え！)	Keiji Hayakawa	Kazunori Itō	Yuichi Endo	February 2, 1983	404
Lum gets Ataru to go on a ski trip with her, but Mendo, Shinobu, and Lum's guards find out and tail along to cause static, Ataru enters a ski contest.: Note: This is the last episode to air before the theatrical release of the first film Urusei Yatsura: Only You.
59	5	"St. Valentine Day Horror"; Transliteration: "Kyōfu no Sei Barentain Dē" (Japanese: 恐怖の聖バレンタインデー)	Directed by : Junji Nishimura; Storyboarded by : Motosuke Takahashi	Kazunori Itō	Asami Endo	February 16, 1983	405
Ten becomes the new Ataru when he mistakenly gets another girl to marry him, but tries to escape so he could see other older women.
60	6	"Love Love Catchball!"; Transliteration: "Rabu Rabu Kyacchiboru!" (Japanese: ラブラブキャッチボール！)	Keiji Hayakawa	Kazunori Itō	Yuji Moriyama	February 23, 1983	406
Ten orders two special balls called Love-Love Catchballs that supposedly show a person's future love, one for each gender. When Ataru finds the one for guys that show their future wives, things quickly get chaotic.
61	7	"The Mendo Family... Masquerade War"; Transliteration: "Mendō Ke... Kamen Butōkai" (Japanese: 面堂家。。。 仮面ぶとう会)	Mamoru Oshii	Kazunori Itō	Asami Endo	March 2, 1983	407
Ryoko plans a masquerade "party" (which is actually a tournament of sorts) to get closer to Ataru, but her brother Shutaro is dead-fast against this, hiring all of Ataru's rivals to fight him.
62	8	"Space Cold Panic!"; Transliteration: "Uchū Kaze Panikku!" (Japanese: 宇宙かぜパニック！)	Directed by : Osamu Sekita; Storyboarded by : Tamiko Kojima	Kazunori Itō	Noboru Furuse	March 9, 1983	408
Lum catches a cold from her father, which soon spreads across the entire male student body at Tomobiki High.
63	9	"Ryunosuke Arrives! I Love the Sea!"; Transliteration: "Ryūnosuke Tōjō! Umi ga Suki!!" (Japanese: 竜之介登場！海が好きっ！！)	Directed by : Mamoru Oshii; Storyboarded by : Motosuke Takahashi	Kazunori Itō	Asami Endo	March 16, 1983	409
After their beach shop is ruined by their fighting due to Ataru and co.'s interference, a father and his "son" Ryunosuke move into Tomobiki High and set up a shop in-school.
64	10	"Goodbye Season"; Transliteration: "Sayonara no Kiseki" (Japanese: さようなら季節)	Mamoru Oshii	Mamoru Oshii	Yuji Moriyama	March 23, 1983	410
Ataru talks to Megane one day about handing over a "position", which Shinobu overhears, thinking that he's planning to give up on Lum. Not wanting to lose Mendou, she takes manners into her own hands..
65	11	"Ran-chan's Great Date Plan!"; Transliteration: "Ran-chan no Dēto Dai Sakusen!" (Japanese: ランちゃんのデート大作戦！)	Directed by : Junji Nishimura; Storyboarded by : Kazuo Yamazaki	Keiji Hayakawa	Kazuo Yamazaki	April 13, 1983	501
Admiring Ran's feminine beauty, Ryunosuke goes out with her in an attempt to become more feminine, but everyone else except Ran (who doesn't know Ryunosuke's true gender and thinks she's going on a date with a guy) thinks this means she's interested in girls when she claims she has no interest in boys. Lum and Ataru decide to intervene with Ran and Ryunosuke's "date".
66	12	"Happy Birthday My Darling"; Transliteration: "Happi Bāsudē Mai Dārin" (Japanese: はっぴいバースデーマイダーリン)	Directed by : Norio Kashima; Storyboarded by : Tamiko Kojima	Kazunori Itō	Asami Endo	April 20, 1983	502
When Ataru flips out over Lum for forgetting his upcoming birthday, she goes absent from school for days and only comes home late at night. This causes both Ataru and Lum to become upset, as well as separately confine in Miss Sakura.
67	13	"Seeing Togenkyo as a Hell Camp!"; Transliteration: "Jigoku no Kyanpu ni Tōgenkyō wo Mita!" (Japanese: 地獄のキャンプに桃源郷を見た！)	Directed by : Junji Nishimura; Storyboarded by : Mitsugu Kanzaki	Kazunori Itō	Akemi Takada	April 27, 1983	503
After enduring Lum's ultra-spicy dinner on a camping trip, Ataru, Mendou, Megane, and Perm head off to find food (with Lum and Ten not far behind). They eventually end up fighting against the Evil Peach after they're tipped off by Cherry of a village that produces giant peaches, wanting to save a beautiful girl from being sacrificed.
68	14	"The Muco Flower's Name is Ryunosuke"; Transliteration: "Hana Muko no Na wa Ryūnosuke" (Japanese: 花ムコの名は竜之介)	Directed by : Mamoru Oshii; Storyboarded by : Takashi Ano	Kazunori Itō	Toshiki Hirano	May 11, 1983	504
Ataru is changed into a girl by Kurama's tengu henchmen after they try to use a cannon to change Ryunosuke into a man for their princess.
69	15	"Bottled Letter Seashore Mystery!"; Transliteration: "Binzume Retā Umibe no Kai!" (Japanese: ビンづめレター海辺の怪！)	Junji Nishimura	Kazunori Itō	Kazuo Yamazaki	May 25, 1983	505
After Ataru, Ten, and Mendo fall for a beautiful woman's love letters - which end up luring them (along with Lum and Shinobu) to the inn she works in - they stay at a creepy inn, where the residents quite literally want them for dinner.
70	16	"Dramatic Appearance! Mizunokoji Ton-chan!!"; Transliteration: "Gekiretsu Tōjō! Mizunokōji Ton-chan!!" (Japanese: 激烈登場！水乃小路トンちゃん！！)	Directed by : Osamu Sekita; Storyboarded by : Motosuke Takahashi	Hiroyuki Hoshiyama	Asami Endo	June 1, 1983	506
Mendo's rival Tobimaro Mizunokoji returns, and the two decide to settle their baseball rivalry once and for all.
71	17	"Shinobu's Cinderella Story"; Transliteration: "Shinobu no Shinderera Sutōrī" (Japanese: しのぶのシンデレラストーリー)	Directed by : Junji Nishimura; Storyboarded by : Mamoru Oshii	Kazunori Itō	Asami Endo	June 8, 1983	507
Shinobu gets involved with the rich Kobayakawa family's youngest son, the adopted Makoto, whose father recently died. But his older siblings want to bump him off so that they don't have to share their late father's wealth with him.
72	18	"Lum-chan the Ruthless Rebel"; Transliteration: "Ramu-chan no Riyūnaki Hankō" (Japanese: ラムちゃんの理由なき反抗)	Directed by : Osamu Sekita; Storyboarded by : Tamiko Kojima	Kazunori Itō	Asami Endo	June 15, 1983	508
Ataru is the producer/director of a film for school. At first it only involves him, Lum, and the Stormtroopers, but it soon involves most of the student body after Ataru gets funding by Mendo.
73	19	"Big Showdown! Sakura vs Sakuranbo!!"; Transliteration: "Dai Shōbu! Sakura tai Sakuranbō!!" (Japanese: 大勝負！サクラvs錯乱坊！！)	Junji Nishimura	Kazunori Itō	Takafumi Hayashi	June 22, 1983	509
Ataru and Lum are left home alone when his parents leave for three days, and Lum locks Ataru inside of his own house. When a botched-up meal causes planes and tanks to appear instead of food, it attracts the attention of Sakura and Sakuranbo, who try to fight them off, but end up fighting against each other's summoned creatures instead.
74	20	"Ghost Story! Old Man Willow!!"; Transliteration: "Kai Dan! Yanagi no Oji Ji!!" (Japanese: 怪談！柳のオジジ！！)	Naoyuki Yoshinaga	Hiroyuki Hoshiyama	Asami Endo	June 29, 1983	510
Onsen-Mark tells the class a story of a cursed willow tree, which Ataru finds a load of fluff and ends up releasing an old man after Mendou after he carved his company's symbol with a knife on said tree. The old man drops a map to a possible treasure, while Mendou plans to see him at midnight to settle a score regarding the mockery of his company logo Ataru carved on the back of his robe. Meanwhile, Onsen-Mark is forced to do guard duty across the school by himself at night.
75	21	"And Then There was Nobody!?"; Transliteration: "Soshite Dare mo Inakunattaccha!?" (Japanese: そして誰もいなくなったっちゃ！？)	Directed by : Junji Nishimura; Storyboarded by : Kazuo Yamazaki	Kazunori Itō	Kazuo Yamazaki	July 6, 1983	511
In this take of the novel And Then There Were None, Ataru, Lum, Shinobu, Mendo, Onsen-Mark, Sakura, Cherry, and the Stormtroopers have a stay at a mansion, where they are slowly picked off one by one in a manner similar to the nursery rhyme Cock Robin.
76	22	"Firefighter Mama Visits!"; Transliteration: "Hikeshi Mama Sanjō!" (Japanese: 火消しママ参上！)	Mamoru Oshii	Hiroyuki Hoshiyama	Yuji Moriyama	July 13, 1983	512
Ten's mother, a firefighter, comes to visit her son on Earth. Ten must keep his fire-breathing a secret from his mother as she hates pyromaniacs and will send all those who are to Hell. Unfortunately for him, Ataru - taking full advantage of Ten's mother's position - isn't going to make it easy on him.
77	23	"Darling's Dying!?"; Transliteration: "Dārin ga Shinjau!?" (Japanese: ダーリンが死んじゃう！？)	Directed by : Mamoru Oshii; Storyboarded by : Makoto Moriwaki	Kazunori Itō	Asami Endo	July 20, 1983	513
When Ataru gets poisoned by one of Ran's cupcakes, Lum rushes into a magical world to find an antidote for him before he dies.
78	24	"Pitiful! Mother of Love and Banishment!?"; Transliteration: "Mijime! Ai to Sasurai no Haha!?" (Japanese: みじめ！愛とさすらいの母！？)	Junji Nishimura	Mamoru Oshii	Kazuo Yamazaki	July 27, 1983	601
An accident at the mall causes Ataru's mother to become unconscious. During this time she begins to have nightmares.
79	25	"Mendo Family - Summer Christmas"; Transliteration: "Mendō Ke - Samā Kurisumasu" (Japanese: 面堂家 サマークリスマス)	Directed by : Osamu Uemura; Storyboarded by : Mamoru Oshii	Hiro Iwasaki	Takafumi Hayashi	August 3, 1983	602
Ryoko holds a "Summer Xmas" party, where everyone must come in male-female pairs. And the main attraction is a gigantic Christmas tree, which they must climb in order to get to the dance floor above. The male winner will receive a kiss from Ryoko, and the female Mendou.
80	26	"Panic in the Haunted Inn"; Transliteration: "Panikku in Yūrei Minshuku" (Japanese: パニックイン幽霊民宿)	Directed by : Junji Nishimura; Storyboarded by : Tameo Kohanawa	Hiroshi Konishikawa	Kazuo Yamazaki	August 10, 1983	603
Ataru, Lum, Mendo, and Shinobu stay at an inn and meet Otama, a scaredy-cat ghost who tries (and fails) to out-scare an old couple each year around the summer. But the old couple are far scarier than she is (though not on purpose).
81	27	"Ah The Eyelid of Mother"; Transliteration: "Ā Mabuta no Haha" (Japanese: ああまぶたの母)	Directed by : Osamu Uemura; Storyboarded by : Mamoru Oshii	Kazunori Itō	Yuji Moriyama	August 17, 1983	604
Ryunosuke tries to recall what her mother was like, and her father doesn't help her at all in this endeavor. Note: Another new eyecatch featuring Lum and Ataru is introduced this episode.
82	28	"Full of Sunshine - Full of Amours"; Transliteration: "Taiyō ga Ippai - Uwaki ga Ippai" (Japanese: 太陽がいっぱい 浮気がいっぱい)	Directed by : Junji Nishimura; Storyboarded by : Tameo Kohanawa	Kazunori Itō	Katsuhiko Nishijima & Asami Endo	August 24, 1983	605
Thanks to Ten's Core technology, he, Ataru, and Mendo make three Sakura sand dolls come to life. Frustrated, Lum goes out with another guy to make Ataru jealous.
83	29	"Big Clash! Ten VS Ataru"; Transliteration: "Dai Gekitotsu! Ten TAI Ataru" (Japanese: 大激突！テンVSあたる)	Directed by : Osamu Uemura; Storyboarded by : Mamoru Oshii	Mamoru Oshii	Takafumi Hayashi	September 7, 1983	606
Tired of being defeated recently by Ataru, Ten goes into training with the help of Cherry and Lum to defeat his arch-nemesis.
84	30	"Terror! Tororo has Come to Attack!!"; Transliteration: "Kyōfu! Tororo ga Semete Kuru!!" (Japanese: 恐怖！トロロが攻めてくる！！)	Directed by : Osamu Sekita; Storyboarded by : Motosuke Takahashi	Kazunori Itō	Motosuke Takahashi	September 14, 1983	607
In a spoof of Matango, during a holiday at Mendo's family's mountain lodge, Lum, Shinobu, Ataru and Mendou are attacked by crazed Tororo yam filling (torojiru).
85	31	"Galactic Teacher CAO-2's Revenge"; Transliteration: "Wakusei Kyōshi Shī Ei O-Tsū no Fukushū" (Japanese: 惑星教師CAO－2の復讐)	Directed by : Osamu Sekita; Storyboarded by : Tori Nano	Kazunori Itō	Toshiki Hirano	September 21, 1983	608
Lum, Ran, Benten, and Oyuki find out that their old teacher, a giant, robot chalkboard eraser named CAO-2, has come to Earth after being trapped on a deserted planet for years. And the former three are not pleased with the news.
86	32	"Outraged! Piteous Kid Shutaro!!"; Transliteration: "Gyakujō! Mijime Ko Shūtarō!!" (Japanese: 逆上！みじめっ子終太郎！！)	Directed by : Toshiyuki Sakurai; Storyboarded by : Tamiko Kojima	Kazunori Itō	Yuji Moriyama	October 12, 1983	609
Ataru, Lum, Shinobu, Mendo, and Ryunosuke go back in time to when Mendou was an obnoxious, violent kid to cure him of both his nyctophobia and claustrophobia.
87	33	"Grand! The Mysterious Matsutake Pot!!"; Transliteration: "Sōzetsu! Nazo no Matsutake Nabe!!" (Japanese: 壮絶！謎のまつたけなべ！！)	Directed by : Osamu Sekita; Storyboarded by : Motosuke Takahashi	Kazunori Itō	Takafumi Hayashi	October 26, 1983	610
A batch of matsutake mushrooms from Cherry turn the Tomobiki High student body and staff alike (except Lum and Cherry himself) into a bunch of high weirdos desperate for entertainment.
88	34	"Enraged Lum-chan!"; Transliteration: "Ikari no Ramu-chan!" (Japanese: 怒りのラムちゃん！)	Directed by : Osamu Sekita; Storyboarded by : Motosuke Takahashi	Kazunori Itō	Motosuke Takahashi	November 2, 1983	611
After Ten burns Lum's scarf she made especially for Ataru, he's forced to do something he's never really done before - apologize. And Ataru is making sure to drag this out as much as possible, even convincing Lum to get angry at him.
89	35	"Lum and Ataru – A Night only for Two"; Transliteration: "Ramu to Ataru - Futari Dake no Yoru" (Japanese: ラムとあたる・二人だけの夜)	Directed by : Osamu Sekita; Storyboarded by : Tamiko Kojima	Kazunori Itō	Noboru Furuse	November 9, 1983	612
Ataru's parents head away for an overnight trip to Atami, leaving Lum and Ataru in the house together. Ataru dreads the prospect of a Lum-cooked dinner, while a horrified Mendo and Lum's Stormtroopers storm the Moroboshi home to protect Lum from Ataru. Ataru tries to kiss her at the last moment, but as a precaution, puts an armor that prevents electricity, in the last frames...he begins to cry.
90	36	"Lady Ryunosuke!"; Transliteration: "Redī Ryūnosuke!" (Japanese: レディー竜之介！)	Directed by : Osamu Sekita; Storyboarded by : Mamoru Oshii	Kazunori Itō	Toshiki Hirano	November 23, 1983	613
Onsen-Mark is given the task of making "a woman" out of Ryunosuke.
91	37	"Document - Who Will Be Miss Tomobiki!?"; Transliteration: "Dokyumento - Misu Tomobiki wa Dare da?" (Japanese: ドキュメント・ミス友引は誰だ！？)	Directed by : Takashi Ano; Storyboarded by : Motosuke Takahashi	Kazunori Itō	Motosuke Takahashi	November 30, 1983	614
A contest is held in Tomobiki for Miss Tomobiki, with a reward of 150,000 yen for the winner. Candidates include Lum, Shinobu, Ran, Sakura, and Ryunosuke.
92	38	"Bizarre! The Medicine of Selflessness!!"; Transliteration: "Kikai! Muga no Myōyaku!!" (Japanese: 奇怪！無我の妙薬！！)	Directed by : Osamu Sekita; Storyboarded by : Keiji Hayakawa	Keiji Hayakawa	Takeshi Ôsaka	December 7, 1983	615
Ataru has a literal out-of-body experience when he eats a strange potion shaped like a fish cookie from Cherry.
93	39	"Shutaro - Jinxed Morning"; Transliteration: "Shūtarō - Fukō no Asa" (Japanese: 終太郎・不幸の朝)	Directed by : Mamoru Oshii, Keiji Hayakawa, Osamu Sekita & Tamiko Kojima; Storyboarded by : Tameo Kohanawa, Masuji Harada & Tamiko Kojima	Yū Yamamoto, Hiroyuki Hoshiyama, Akira Nakahara & Masaki Tsuji	Asami Endo, Hayao Node & Noboru Furuse	December 14, 1983	616
Mendo talks to Sakuranbo about Ataru's possible weaknesses in this clip show episode.
94	40	"The Story of a Traveling Snow Dharma"; Transliteration: "Tabi no Yuki Daruma Jōwa" (Japanese: 旅の雪ダルマ情話)	Osamu Uemura	Takashi Ano	Takafumi Hayashi	December 21, 1983	617
After saving its life three times from Ten's antics, a snowman spirit awards Ataru with a late night dinner, taking the form of a cute pink-haired girl that only he can see.
95	41	"Lum-chan's Ancient Japanese Fairytales"; Transliteration: "Ramu-chan no Nihon Mukashi Banashi" (Japanese: ラムちゃんの日本昔話)	Directed by : Tetsurō Amino; Storyboarded by : Keiji Hayakawa	Keiji Hayakawa	Takeshi Ôsaka	January 11, 1984	618
Cherry tells Ten a fairytale that's basically a giant mishmash of Japanese children's stories, featuring Ataru and Lum as an old couple and Ten as their "son".
96	42	"Shine! The Blessed Bra!!"; Transliteration: "Kagayake! Akogare no Bura!!" (Japanese: かがやけ！あこがれのブラ！！)	Directed by : Iku Suzuki; Storyboarded by : Tamiko Kojima	Michiru Shimada	Noboru Furuse	January 18, 1984	701
Ryunosuke is blackmailed into going on a date with Shinobu to obtain a bra, which she's always wanted to wear.
97	43	"Duel! Benten VS the Three Daughters"; Transliteration: "Kettō! Benten TAI Sannin Musume!!" (Japanese: 決斗！弁天VS三人娘！！)	Osamu Uemura	Kazunori Itō	Takeshi Ôsaka	January 25, 1984	702
A trio of middle-school space girls steal Benten's chain and then challenge her, Lum, and Oyuki to fight them.
98	44	"Lum-chan is Full!"; Transliteration: "Ramu-chan ga Ippai!" (Japanese: ラムちゃんがいっぱい！)	Directed by : Tetsurō Amino; Storyboarded by : Keiji Hayakawa	Minoru Shinbayashi	Takeshi Ôsaka	February 1, 1984	703
Ran tries to clone Lum to get revenge on her, but it doesn't work quite as planned.
99	45	"Deadly! Standup Eating Wars!!"; Transliteration: "Hissatsu! Tachi Gui Uōzu!!" (Japanese: 必殺！立ち食いウォーズ！！)	Iku Suzuki	Kazunori Itō	Noboru Furuse	February 8, 1984	704
Megane deals with a tough, fast-eating "fast-food costumer dragon" named Ryuu at the noodle shop he works at, who criticizes others' inferior foods and eats for free if not satisfied. But soon other fast-food fighters start hitting the scene in Tomobiki, and Megane only worries even more. Turns out that Mendou, who's thinking of opening a supermarket in town in an attempt to bankrupt the small-time family restaurants, is the cause of this, starting a contest between Ataru and co. and the fast-food fighters to determine if Tomobiki gets the supermarket.: Note: This is the last episode to air before the theatrical release of the second film Urusei Yatsura 2: Beautiful Dreamer.
100	46	"Great Vault! Courageous Survival!!"; Transliteration: "Dai Kinko! Kesshi no Sabaibaru!!" (Japanese: 大金庫！決死のサバイバル！！)	Directed by : Osamu Uemura; Storyboarded by : Takashi Ano	Takashi Ano	Noboru Furuse	February 15, 1984	705
Ataru and Mendou get locked in the latter's giant safe, where they slowly go mad when the place starts flooding and they try to out-survive each other. NOTE: This is the only episode which doesn't contain Lum throughout.
101	47	"Operation - Peek in the Woman's Bath"; Transliteration: "Maruhi Sakusen - Onnayu wo Nozoke!" (Japanese: ㊙作戦・女湯をのぞけ！)	Directed by : Iku Suzuki; Storyboarded by : Motosuke Takahashi	Kazunori Itō	Motosuke Takahashi	February 22, 1984	706
Ataru takes a bath at an old-fashioned sento (along with Cherry), where he tries to peek on the girls' side, where Lum, Shinobu, Sakura, Ran, Ryoko, Ryunosuke, Benten, and Oyuki are having a private party. But soon the Stormtroopers and even Mendo find out about Ataru's plan.
102	48	"Sakura - Melancholy of a Youth Time"; Transliteration: "Sakura - Aishū no Yōnen Ki" (Japanese: サクラ・哀愁の幼年期)	Directed by : Tetsurō Amino; Storyboarded by : Tamiko Kojima	Tamiko Kojima	Takeshi Ôsaka	February 29, 1984	707
Sakura literally re-meets her childhood when Cherry slips her a pill that makes her childhood self appear, who wants to play. But everyone else thinks it's her illegitimate child.
103	49	"Burning Ran's Emotional Video Mail"; Transliteration: "Moeyo Ran Ikari no Bideo Mēru" (Japanese: 燃えよラン怒りのビデオメール)	Directed by : Osamu Uemura, Mamoru Oshii, Keiji Hayakawa, Kazuo Yamazaki & Tamiko Kojima; Storyboarded by : Osamu Uemura, Kazuo Yamazaki & Motosuke Takahashi	Kazunori Itō, Yū Yamamoto & Tadashi Fukui	Noboru Furuse, Kazuo Yamazaki, Asami Endo & Hayao Node	March 7, 1984	708
Ran gets video tapes "highlighting" her unhappy childhood, as well as previous episodes' events, via clips. NOTE: Ran is the only character who appears in new animation.
104	50	"Sakura-san is My Youth!"; Transliteration: "Waga Seishun no Sakura-san!" (Japanese: わが青春のサクラさん！)	Directed by : Mamoru Oshii, Keiji Hayakawa, Tamiko Kojima, Junji Nishimura, Osamu Uemura & Takashi Ano; Storyboarded by : Mamoru Oshii, Keiji Hayakawa, Mizuho Nishikubo, Tamiko Kojima, Motosuke Takahashi, Mitsugu Kanzaki & Kazuo Yamazaki	Kazunori Itō, Yū Yamamoto, Takao Koyama, Hiroyuki Hoshiyama, Tadashi Fukui & Mamoru Oshii	Hayao Node, Asami Endo, Yuji Yatabe, Kazuo Yamazaki, Takafumi Hayashi & Motosuke Takahashi	March 14, 1984	709
Ataru recounts how he met Sakura, and how she ended up as the school nurse of his school. This is intermixed with clips from previous episodes.
105	51	"Scramble! Recapture Lum!!"; Transliteration: "Sukuranburu! Ramu wo Dakkai se yo!!" (Japanese: スクランブル！ラムを奪回せよ！！)	Osamu Uemura	Kazunori Itō	Noboru Furuse	March 21, 1984	710
Ataru and Lum get into an argument, with Lum going to her UFO to sleep that night. But in her sleep it crashes on Mendou's property, with Lum losing her memory in the process. Mendou, disgusted by Ataru's lack of sympathy about Lum's missing, informs Ataru that she's on his property. He also tells him that if he wants her back, he'll have to go on his property and deal with him and his army. After some nudging by Lum's Stormtroopers, Ataru works together with them to save her.
106	52	"Deathmatch! Ataru VS Mendo Brigade!!"; Transliteration: "Shitō! Ataru TAI Mendō Gundan!!" (Japanese: 死闘！あたるVS面堂軍団！！)	Directed by : Mamoru Oshii & Osamu Sekita; Storyboarded by : Yuji Moriyama	Kazunori Itō	Yuji Moriyama	March 28, 1984	711
Continuing from "Scramble! Recapture Lum!!", despite their best efforts, all of Lum's Stroomtroopers except Megane have been kidnapped. Ataru is saved from captivity by Mendou's little sister Ryoko, who gives him supplies and even a motorcycle to save Lum with.

=== Season 3 (1984–85) ===
No. overall	No. in season	Title	Directed by	Written by	Animation directed by	Original release date	Prod. code
107	1	"Different Dimension Switch - Where is Darling!?"; Transliteration: "I Jigen Kūkan - Dārin wa Doko Datcha!?" (Japanese: 異次元空間 ダーリンはどこだっちゃ！？)	Kazuo Yamazaki	Yumi Asano	Yuji Moriyama	April 11, 1984	801
During Hanami, Ataru snaps a tree branch and somehow causes a rip in dimensions, sending Lum to a parallel world. Here Ataru lost the game of tag in the first episode, his family living in poverty. And he refuses to talk to Lum because he is upset that she ruined his life, as well as his parents'. Lum hops dimensions in hopes of finding the real Ataru.
108	2	"Clash!! Queen Majesty and Ragaman's Love"; Transliteration: "Gekitotsu!! Jō Heika to Ai no Ragāman" (Japanese: 激突！！女王陛下と愛のラガーマン)	Junji Nishimura	Keiko Maruo	Masami Abe	April 25, 1984	802
Ryunosuke loses the cloth that wraps up her breasts, but decides to not buy a new wrap when she's finally treated like a girl by everyone around her. But when it comes time to play rugby at gym class, the boys are more interested in Ryunosuke's large chest than they are in playing the actual game. At the same time, an evil space queen and her all-male henchmen are plotting to overtake Earth, their ship the size (and shape) of a rugby ball.
109	3	"Ran-chan - First Kiss Tastes Tears of Love"; Transliteration: "Ran-chan - Hatsu Kissu Namida no Koi no Aji" (Japanese: ランちゃん・初キッス涙涙の恋の味)	Naoyuki Yoshinaga	Yoshiyuki Suga	Setsuko Shibuichi	May 2, 1984	803
Ran tries to win Rei's heart literally through his stomach. And while she doesn't succeed, she does manage to get an indirect kiss from him when he licks bean paste from her face. Lum is happy to see Rei and Ran paired up, ecstatic at the idea that Ran will no longer bother her. Or is she...?
110	4	"Un-re-mov-ab-le Rouge Magic"; Transliteration: "Ki-e-na-i Rūju Majikku" (Japanese: き・え・な・いルージュマジック)	Iku Suzuki	Michiru Shimada	Takafumi Hayashi	May 9, 1984	804
Lum is sad that she's never kissed Ataru, so she invents a lipstick that makes whoever wears it to kiss anyone else who's also wearing it.
111	5	"Deathmatch!! The Mendo Family Flower Display Death Match"; Transliteration: "Shitō!! Mendō Ka Hana Mi Desu Matchi" (Japanese: 死闘！！面堂家花見デスマッチ)	Directed by : Junji Nishimura; Storyboarded by : Motosuke Takahashi	Yumi Asano	Takafumi Hayashi	May 16, 1984	805
A mysterious monster is causing strange events in town. Mendo figures out what the monster is when all of his octopuses are turned to heptapuses.
112	6	"Benten & Ryunosuke - Run Toward Tomorrow!"; Transliteration: "Benten ando Ryūnosuke - Asu ni Mukatte Hashire!" (Japanese: 弁天&竜之介 明日に向って走れ！)	Kazuo Yamazaki	Keiko Maruo	Masami Abe	May 23, 1984	806
Benten drops in to Tomobiki High, making friends with Ryunosuke, leading to crime-fighting, kitten-saving adventures.
113	7	"Great Horrors! Oyuki is Finally Angered!!"; Transliteration: "Dai Kyōfu! Oyuki Tsui ni Okoru!!" (Japanese: 大恐怖！おユキついに怒る！！)	Junji Nishimura	Yoshiyuki Suga	Yuji Moriyama	May 30, 1984	807
Ran upsets Oyuki and relives a traumatizing childhood experience with an angry Oyuki. The song "Magical Mystery Tour" by The Beatles seems to be featured as well. NOTE: This is the only episode which doesn't contain Ataru throughout.
114	8	"Ten-chan's Strange Love Story"; Transliteration: "Ten-chan no Fushigi na Koi no Monogatari" (Japanese: テンちゃんの不思議な恋の物語)	Naoyuki Yoshinaga	Toshiki Inoue	Yuichi Endo	June 6, 1984	808
Ten meets a lovely little girl, only to find their time together is all too brief. Also in this episode: sumo wrestling and puppies.
115	9	"Haunted Special! Search for Mendo Mansion's Treasure!!"; Transliteration: "Makyō supesharu! Mendō Tei no Zaihō wo Sagase!!" (Japanese: 魔境スペシャル！面堂邸の財宝を探せ！！)	Iku Suzuki	Keiko Maruo	Takafumi Hayashi	June 13, 1984	809
Mendo's elderly grandfather requests Shutaro find the secret family treasure. Unfortunately for Shutaro, his classmates decide to join. Unfortunately for his classmates, is it hidden in the extensive Mendo Estate.
116	10	"Love and War! Battle of Glove VS Pants!!"; Transliteration: "Ai to Tōkon! Gurōbu TAI Pantsu no Kettō!!" (Japanese: 愛と闘魂！グローブVSパンツの決闘！！)	Yumiko Suda	Yoshiyuki Suga	Kyoko Kato	June 20, 1984	810
Possessed accessories bring three of our heroes to a spiritual fight to the... nap time.
117	11	"Lum-chan's Becoming a Cow?"; Transliteration: "Ramu-chan ushi ni naru!?" (Japanese: ラムちゃん牛になる！？)	Directed by : Iku Suzuki; Storyboarded by : Tamiko Kojima	Toshiki Inoue	Setsuko Shibuichi	June 27, 1984	811
Lum and Ataru are both bitten by a cow in a pet shop. Shortly afterward, Lum's horns begin to grow and resemble a cow's horns, and a horrified Lum believes she is turning into a cow.
118	12	"Great Achievement! This is Lum-chan's Youth Film"; Transliteration: "Dōdō Kansei! Kore ga Ramu-chan no Seishun Eiga" (Japanese: 堂々完成！これがラムちゃんの青春映画)	Junji Nishimura	Yumi Asano & Yoshiyuki Suga	Yuichi Endo	July 11, 1984	812
Megane convinces everyone to help him make a film starring Lum.
119	13	"Scaring Ghosts! Pretty Sakura's Oharai!!"; Transliteration: "Yōkai Taisan! Adesugata Sakura no Oharai!!" (Japanese: 妖怪退散！艶姿サクラのおはらい！！)	Naoyuki Yoshinaga	Tokio Tsuchiya	Yuji Moriyama	July 18, 1984	813
Sakura's wand needs a recharge, leaving an opening for all the ghosties!
120	14	"Counterattack of the Primeval Animals! Panic at the Poolside"; Transliteration: "Gensei Dōbutsu no Gyakushū! Pūrusaido wa Ōsawagi" (Japanese: 原生動物の逆襲！プールサイドは大騒ぎ)	Iku Suzuki	Toshiki Inoue	Takafumi Hayashi	July 25, 1984	814
Ten gets a lesson once again about Oni candy and Earthlings while Ataru and Mendou's relationship develops to new levels.
121	15	"Appeared Again! Hunter of Love Princess Kurama"; Transliteration: "Matamata Tōjō! Ai no Kariudo Kurama Hime" (Japanese: またまた登場！愛の狩人クラマ姫)	Mamoru Hamatsu	Shigeru Yanagawa	Tsukasa Dokite	August 1, 1984	815
Kurama returns to find her mate. Instead she meets her match.
122	16	"The Fox's Hard Feelings of Painful Love..."; Transliteration: "Kitsune no Kata Omoi Koisuredo Setsunaku..." (Japanese: キツネのかた想い恋すれどせつなく…)	Kazuo Yamazaki	Michiru Shimada	Yuichi Endo	August 15, 1984	816
How can little Kitsune repay Shinobu's good deed?
123	17	"Ryunosuke Stunned! My Young Child Loves Rock Mother!!"; Transliteration: "Ryūnosuke Bōzen! Waga Ko Koishi ya Ganseki no Haha!!" (Japanese: 竜之介ボー然！わが子恋しや岩石の母！！)	Junji Nishimura	Hirohisa Soda	Takafumi Hayashi	August 22, 1984	817
A beach town frantically searches for the food-thieving goblin as Ryunosuke is once again plagued by her past... and her dramatic father.
124	18	"Thriller! Curra~n Collo~n Womens Dorm!!"; Transliteration: "Kaidan! Kara~n Koro~n Joshi Ryō!!" (Japanese: 怪談！カラ〜ンコロ〜ン女子寮！！)	Iku Suzuki	Keiko Maruo	Yuji Moriyama	August 29, 1984	818
Ataru's ghost story becomes all too real when no matter how hard Lum tries to stop it.
125	19	"Pool Spooks! Burning with Forbidden Love!!"; Transliteration: "Pūru Yōkai! Yurusarenu Koi ni Moete!!" (Japanese: プール妖怪！許されぬ恋に燃えて！！)	Tomokazu Kougo	Tokio Tsuchiya	Kyoko Kato	September 12, 1984	819
The gang helps Pochi rescue his beloved blowfish from the sharky kidnapper.
126	20	"Ran-chan Panic: There is No Tomorrow for Tomobiki Town"; Transliteration: "Ran-chan Panikku: Tomobiki Machi ni Ashita wa Nai" (Japanese: ランちゃんパニック 友引町に明日はない)	Directed by : Iku Suzuki; Storyboarded by : Motosuke Takahashi	Yumi Asano	Naoko Yamamoto	September 19, 1984	820
Ran's lost konpeito-like supernova fragment causes quite a ruckus for Tomobiki High. The song The Fool on the Hill by The Beatles seems to be featured as well.
127	21	"Where is Love's Room? Kuriko and Chojuro"; Transliteration: "Ai no Sumika wa Izuko? Kuriko to Chōjūrō" (Japanese: 愛のすみかはいずこ？栗子と長十郎)	Naoyuki Yoshinaga	Shigeru Yanagawa	Yuichi Endo	September 26, 1984	821
Pear-consciousness brings everyone in class closer to Ataru.
128	22	"Man or Bird? Gokakenran Ally of Justice!"; Transliteration: "Hito ka Tori ka? Gōkakenran Seigi no Mikata!" (Japanese: 人か鳥か？豪華けんらん正義の味方！)	Junji Nishimura	Toshiki Inoue	Takafumi Hayashi	October 17, 1984	901
Ten learns the difficulties of being the righteousness of the universe when he gets powers from a salary-man superhero, whom Ran and Lum have a grudge against.: Note: Another new eyecatch is introduced in this episode.
129	23	"Attack the Seniors! Revenge of the Knowing Three Daughters"; Transliteration: "Senpai wo Yattsukero! Gozonji Sannin Musume no Gyakushū" (Japanese: 先輩をやっつけろ！ご存知三人娘の逆襲)	Norio Kashima	Tokio Tsuchiya	Tsukasa Dokite	October 24, 1984	902
The Planet Middle School Girl Gang is back to get revenge on Lum. However, she's too distracted by Ataru's proposition; if she can go three days without shocking him, he'll go on a date with her.
130	24	"Blazing Hidden Trick! This Straight Line Road"; Transliteration: "Moe yo Kakushi Gei! Kono Michi Itchoku Sen" (Japanese: 燃えよかくし芸！この道一直線)	Yumiko Suda	Hirohisa Soda	Kyoko Kato	October 31, 1984	903
Lum finds an alien way to motivate everyone to do their best at the talent show.
131	25	"Don't Die! Ryoko's Special Straw Doll!!"; Transliteration: "Shindara Akan! Ryōko no Tokusei Wara Ningyō!!" (Japanese: 死んだらあかん！了子の特製ワラ人形！！)	Directed by : Naoyuki Yoshinaga; Storyboarded by : Kazuo Yamazaki	Toshiki Inoue	Yuichi Endo	November 7, 1984	904
Ryoko harnesses the power of voodoo and gives Ataru a voodoo doll effigy of her brother Shutaro, who unintentionally hurts him without realizing it. Shutaro now must do everything to prevent Ataru from finding out that the voodoo doll is of him, while trying to avoid himself in the process.
132	26	"Matchmaking Hell! Is the Armored Daughter a Beauty? Beast?"; Transliteration: "Omiai Jigoku! Yoroi Musume wa Bijo? Kaijo?" (Japanese: お見合地獄！ヨロイ娘は美女？怪女？)	Iku Suzuki	Shigeru Yanagawa	Tsukasa Dokite	November 14, 1984	905
Shutaro is forced into an arranged marriage with the heavily armored Asuka Mizunokoji of the Mizunokoji clan, who've been mortal enemies with the Mendou clan for generations. While Shutaro wants nothing to do with Asuka, Ataru (of course) wants this armored girl for himself. A girl who, apparently, has never met a man before, much less one outside of her armor. At episode's end her armor is removed via Lum shocking her with Ataru clinging to her, revealing her true appearance. Cherry, breaking the fourth wall as he tells the audience to turn in next time for the conclusion.
133	27	"Love of the Armored Daughter! Maiden Heart is Shaky Wobbling"; Transliteration: "Yoroi Musume no Koi! Otome Kokoro wa Guragura Yurete" (Japanese: ヨロイ娘の恋！乙女心はグラグラゆれて)	Directed by : Iku Suzuki; Storyboarded by : Yuji Moriyama	Shigeru Yanagawa	Yuji Moriyama	November 21, 1984	906
Continuing from "Matchmaking Hell! Is the Armored Daughter a Beauty? Beast?", Asuka's armor now gone, and runs away from Ataru, Shutaro, and even her own brother Tobimaro. It's also revealed why Asuka is in the armor; no male from the Mizunokoji clan is allowed to see their daughter until she turns 15. Shutaro, initially against the idea of the arranged marriage, is now all for it when he hears from Ataru that Asuka is cute, despite her being scary powerful due to 15 years in armor. Ryoko, however, plans to put a stop to the arranged marriage with a giant army and later an armored suit. The marriage is soon after called off.
134	28	"Meeting Even in Death! Pure Fox Returns!!"; Transliteration: "Shinuhodo Aitakute! Junjō Kitsune Futatabi!!" (Japanese: 死ぬほど会いたくて！純情キツネ再び！！)	Naoyuki Yoshinaga	Michiru Shimada	Yuichi Endo	November 28, 1984	907
Inspired by a movie about a fox using a spell to turn a human girl he loves into a fox like himself for one night, Kitsune looks for Shinobu to find his missing gingko nuts, which he wants her to eat under a full moon to do the same. Ataru and Lum help them. Kitsune eventually finds them, turning Lum, Ataru, Cherry, Shinobu, and Kotatsu-Neko all into foxes, as well as many of the people in town partially into foxes as well. A half-fox Shinbou and Kitsune dance together under the full moon, happy together.
135	29	"What Do I Care for Talking Flowers!"; Transliteration: "Oshaberi Hana Nanka dō wa Ikkirai!" (Japanese: おしゃべり花なんかどうわいっきらい！)	Junji Nishimura	Yumi Asano	Takafumi Hayashi	December 5, 1984	908
Ran and Lum learn a valuable lesson about spreading rumors after Ran's talking flowers (named Ryuugenvillias) spread rumors about them to the entire town, soon affecting/hurting everyone's lives. (Aside from Ataru, oddly enough, who is mostly unaffected due to one growing on his head and Shinobu, one grows on her shoulder until their weakness is the wind, which blows the petals away.)
136	30	"The Birth of Ten-chan's Son!? I Dunno"; Transliteration: "Ten-chan no Musuko Tanjō!? Wai wa Shirando" (Japanese: テンちゃんの息子誕生！？わいは知らんど)	Tomokazu Kougo	Tokio Tsuchiya	Kyoko Kato	December 12, 1984	909
An accident causes an egg to be attached to Ten's body. The egg hatches and reveals a strange bee-like creature who proceeds to harass Ten constantly, claiming Ten is his father.
137	31	"Lum's Courageous Duel! Victory is a Nitpicky Hand"; Transliteration: "Ramu no Yūkiaru Kettō! Shōri wa Sekoi Te de" (Japanese: ラムの勇気ある決闘！勝利はせこい手で)	Iku Suzuki	Shigeru Yanagawa	Yuichi Endo	December 19, 1984	910
Lum learns just how much she needs her powers.
138	32	"Big Employment Aspiration! Return of Missing Ninja Kaede!!"; Transliteration: "Shūshoku Dai Ganbō! Kaettekita Nuke Nin Kaede!!" (Japanese: 就職大願望！帰ってきた抜け忍かえで！！)	Junji Nishimura	Shigeru Yanagawa	Takafumi Hayashi	January 9, 1985	911
Ninja Kaede seeks a new life in the city.
139	33	"Tomobiki Highschool Survival! Who Are the Survivors!"; Transliteration: "Tomobiki Kōkō Sabaibaru! Ikinokoru no wa Dare da" (Japanese: 友引高校サバイバル！生き残るのは誰だ！)	Naoyuki Yoshinaga	Toshiki Inoue	Yuichi Endo	January 16, 1985	912
Texas Chainsaw Tomato Massacre at its finest.
140	34	"The Mysterious Giant Cake! Love's Escape Panic!!"; Transliteration: "Nazo no Kyodai Kēki! Koi no Tōhikō Panikku!!" (Japanese: 謎の巨大ケーキ！恋の逃避行パニック！！)	Yumiko Suda	Shigeru Yanagawa	Kyoko Kato	January 23, 1985	913
Mendo's New Year's party takes a delicious, spongy turn when Ryoko hears about it.: Note: This is the last episode to air before the theatrical release of the third film Urusei Yatsura 3: Remember My Love.
141	35	"Underground Reincarnation! What's Darling Thinking!?"; Transliteration: "Makyō Tensei! Dārin wa Nani wo Kangaeterutcha!?" (Japanese: 魔境転生！ダーリンはなにを考えてるっちゃ！？)	Junji Nishimura	Toshiki Inoue	Takafumi Hayashi	January 30, 1985	914
The gang lands on an island where "poison" literally makes one's dreams come true.
142	36	"Snow Panic! The Mendo Family Hanami Banquet!!"; Transliteration: "Oshibai Panikku! Mendō Ka Hanami no Utage!!" (Japanese: お芝居パニック！面堂家花見のうたげ！！)	Iku Suzuki	Tokio Tsuchiya	Yuichi Endo	February 6, 1985	915
Once again, everyone is taught that Oni eating human food and humans eating Oni food is a drunken disaster.
143	37	"Far Spring! Tale of the Lonely Fairy!!"; Transliteration: "Haru Tōkaraji! Sabishigari ya no Yōsei Monogatari!!" (Japanese: 春遠からじ！さびしがり屋の妖精物語！！)	Naoyuki Yoshinaga	Michiru Shimada	Takafumi Hayashi (as Shinkuro Date)	February 13, 1985	916
Ataru learns the importance of happy thought thanks to a fairy.
144	38	"To Dream Land! Darling Battle Royal Abduction"; Transliteration: "Yume no Naka he! Dārin Sōdatsu Batoru Roiyaru" (Japanese: 夢の中へ！ダーリン争奪バトルロイヤル)	Tomokazu Kougo	Shigeru Yanagawa	Kyoko Kato	February 20, 1985	917
Everyone learns about eating other people's dreams.
145	39	"Three Daughters Again! The Great Mission Tempting Darling!!"; Transliteration: "Matamoya Sannin Musume! Dārin Yūwaku Dai Sakusen!!" (Japanese: またもや三人娘！ダーリン誘惑大作戦！！)	Junji Nishimura	Tokio Tsuchiya	Yuichi Endo	February 27, 1985	918
Ginger, Pepper, and Sugar return to their old tricks to break up Lum and Ataru.
146	40	"The Scampering Kotatsu Cat! Anything to Get Warm"; Transliteration: "Kake Meguru Kotatsu Neko! Nani ga Nandemo Atatamaru" (Japanese: 駆けめぐるコタツ猫！何が何でも暖まる)	Iku Suzuki	Toshiki Inoue	Takafumi Hayashi	March 6, 1985	919
Kotatsu Cat proves himself to be true to his name by catching the ever-running Kotatsu.
147	41	"Ryunosuke's Naïve Father! A Wife is in Vestiges!!"; Transliteration: "Ryūnosuke no Chichi Junjō su! Tsuma wa Omokage no Naka ni!!" (Japanese: 竜之介の父・純情す！妻は面影の中に！！)	Naoyuki Yoshinaga	Shigeru Yanagawa	Masami Abe	March 13, 1985	920
Ryunosuke's father tries to bring Masako to Ryunosuke's life with lies and trickery.
148	42	"Spring Full Bloom!? Frozen by Oyuki's Cold!!"; Transliteration: "Haru Ran Man!? Oyuki no Kaze de Kōri Zuke!!" (Japanese: 春らんまん！？おユキのカゼで氷づけ！！)	Junji Nishimura	Shigeru Yanagawa	Hidetoshi Ōmori	March 20, 1985	921
Oyuki's cold is unlike anyone's on Earth. It's far more literal. The only cure can come from a cat.
149	43	"Friendship Panic! I Love to Eat Blowfish"; Transliteration: "Yūjō Panikku! Wai wa Fugu ga Suki ya Nen" (Japanese: 友情パニック！わいはフグが好きやねん)	Tomomi Mochizuki	Shigeru Yanagawa	Kyoko Kato	March 27, 1985	922
Ten finds a new friend in a blowfish and brings havoc to Tomobiki with a blowfish and Oni candy.

=== Season 4 (1985–86) ===
No. overall	No. in season	Title	Directed by	Written by	Animation directed by	Original release date	Prod. code
150	1	"The Armored Girl Returns! Older Brother is Full"; Transliteration: "Kaettekita Yoroi Musume! Onī-sama ga Ippai" (Japanese: 帰ってきたヨロイ娘！お兄様がいっぱい)	Iku Suzuki	Hirohisa Soda	Yuji Moriyama	April 3, 1985	1001
At the demand of her mother, Asuka faces her fear of men in a visit to Tomobiki High School after her love crushes her brother. It goes about as well as expected.
151	2	"Boredom Syndrome! Is Tomobiki Town Wasting Away!?"; Transliteration: "Taikutsu Shindorōmu! Tomobiki Chō wa Izu ko he!?" (Japanese: 退屈シンドローム！友引町はいずこへ！？)	Directed by : Iku Suzuki; Storyboarded by : Kazuo Yamazaki	Toshiki Inoue & Kazuo Yamazaki	Tsukasa Dokite	April 10, 1985	1002
Ataru drinks a can of eye drops Lum left in his room, thinking it was juice. Because of this, everyone ends up having weird dreams.
152	3	"Look Out Ran! Kotatsu Neko's First Love Oden!?"; Transliteration: "Ayaushi Ran! Kotatsu Neko no Hatsu Koi Oden!?" (Japanese: あやうしラン！コタツ猫の初恋オデン！？)	Naoyuki Yoshinaga	Tokio Tsuchiya	Masami Abe	April 17, 1985	1003
Ran cooks an Oden with love mushrooms to Rei, but Kotatsu Neko eats it.
153	4	"The Armored Girl Appears Again! The Storm Called Date"; Transliteration: "Matamata Yoroi Musume Tōjō! Arashi wo Yobu Dēto" (Japanese: またまたヨロイ娘登場！嵐をよぶデート)	Yuji Moriyama	Michiru Shimada	Yuji Moriyama	April 24, 1985	1004
Mrs. Mizunokoji has Mendo and Asuka go on a date on their estate, but Ataru interferes to scare Asuka. Asuka goes on a rampage.
154	5	"The Mystery Priest Appears! Luck Bell Battle Royal"; Transliteration: "Nazo no Bōsan Tōjō! Kane Tsuki Batoru Roiyaru" (Japanese: 謎の坊さん登場！鐘つきバトルロイヤル)	Tomomi Mochizuki	Toshiki Inoue	Kyoko Kato	May 1, 1985	1005
A priest shows up and rings Ataru, Shinobu, Ryu, Lum, Mendo, and Sakura to a great bell in a shrine.
155	6	"First Love Again!? A Return to the Past for Lum and Rei!!"; Transliteration: "Hatsu Koi Futatabi!? Mukashi ni Modoru ka Ramu to Rei!!" (Japanese: 初恋ふたたび！？昔に戻るかラムとレイ！！)	Iku Suzuki	Toshiki Inoue	Hidetoshi Ōmori	May 8, 1985	1006
Jariten finds part of a love locket Lum and Rei got when they were going together. At a birthday party for Mendo's favorite octopus, Lum tries to hide this fact, especially from Ataru.
156	7	"Youthful Old Man Appears! Shine Great Tearoom of Dreams!!"; Transliteration: "Seishun Oji-san Tōjō! Kagayake Yume no Dai Kissaten!!" (Japanese: 青春おじさん登場！輝け夢の大喫茶店！！)	Yumiko Suda	Shigeru Yanagawa	Masami Abe	May 15, 1985	1007
A middle-aged man and his daughter opens up a teahouse which constantly becomes the scene of many fights between Tomobiki High School students and staff.
157	8	"I Love Darling's Kindness..."; Transliteration: "Dārin no Yasashisa ga Suki Datcha..." (Japanese: ダーリンのやさしさが好きだっちゃ…)	Naoyuki Yoshinaga	Tokio Tsuchiya	Tsukasa Dokite	May 22, 1985	1008
A ghost girl who fell in love with Ataru while she was alive wants to have a date with him. She spent most of her life in the hospital and made a scarf, mittens, and most of a sweater before dying; all of which she wanted to give to the handsome boy she saw from her window, Ataru.
158	9	"Pure Fox Again! Shinobu-san is Love"; Transliteration: "Matamata Junjō Gitsune! Shinobu-san ga suki" (Japanese: またまた純情ギツネ！しのぶさんが好き)	Kazuo Yamazaki	Kazuo Yamazaki	Hidetoshi Ōmori & Masahito Sawada	May 29, 1985	1009
Kitsune goes to Tomobiki High School and bring the class back to his class in the woods on a flying bus. NOTE: Kenshiro from Fist of the North Star makes a cameo appearance.
159	10	"I Love the Sea~! Prosperity Record's Thriving Hamajaya!?"; Transliteration: "Umi ga Suki~! Higan no Hamajaya Hanjō Ki!?" (Japanese: 海が好き〜っ！悲願の浜茶屋繁盛記！？)	Iku Suzuki	Michiru Shimada	Masaaki Kannan	June 5, 1985	1010
At the beach, Ataru, Mendo, Shinobu, Lum, and Ryu are trying to attract customers for the Hamajaya restaurant, but Mr. Fujinami keeps scaring away the customers.
160	11	"Ryunosuke VS Benten! Great Fruitless Amorousness Duel"; Transliteration: "Ryūnosuke Tai Benten! Munashiki Oiroke Dai Kettō" (Japanese: 竜之介VS弁天！むなしきお色気大決闘)	Directed by : Osamu Sekita; Storyboarded by : Kazuo Yamazaki	Hirohisa Soda	Katsuhiko Nishijima	June 12, 1985	1011
Benten comes to visit Lum and again meets Ryunosuke, but Mr. Fujinami is trying to convince Benten that Ryu is a boy.
161	12	"Small Magic Bin! What's to Become of Me!?"; Transliteration: "Mahō no Ko Bin! Uchi wa Dō Narutcha!?" (Japanese: 魔法の小ビン！うちはどうなるっちゃ！？)	Iku Suzuki	Shigeru Yanagawa	Masami Abe	June 19, 1985	1012
Jariten buys a magic bottle that can shrink anything down to fit inside it.
162	13	"Great Devil's Debut! Lum's Dangerous Purchase!?"; Transliteration: "Dai Mashin Arawaru! Ramu no Kiken na Okaimono!?" (Japanese: 大魔神現わる！？ラムの危険なお買物！？)	Directed by : Naoyuki Yoshinaga; Storyboarded by : Seicho Hisajima	Tokio Tsuchiya	Masaaki Kannan	June 26, 1985	1013
Discipline in school raises to a new peak because of the disturbances caused by the arrival of packages from space for Lum.
163	14	"Goodness! Words Aren't Getting to Darling"; Transliteration: "Taihen! Dārin ni Kotoba ga Tsūji Naitcha" (Japanese: 大変！ダーリンに言葉が通じないっちゃ)	Kazuo Yamazaki	Toshiki Inoue	Tsukasa Dokite	July 3, 1985	1014
During a fight between Ataru and Ten at breakfast, Ataru misses Ten and hits Lum with a rice cooker, causing her to forget how to understand or speak Japanese.
164	15	"Devil's Summer! Ten-chan's Great Unaju Mission!!"; Transliteration: "Akumu no Natsu! Ten-chan no Unajū Dai Sakusen!!" (Japanese: 悪夢の夏！テンちゃんのうな重大作戦！！)	Directed by : Tsuneo Tominaga; Storyboarded by : Takehito Hobara	Shigeru Yanagawa	Setsuko Shibuichi	July 10, 1985	1015
Jariten gets a fever from staying in the sun too long and the cure is to be made very cold.
165	16	"Omimai Panic!? I Didn't Mean Any Harm"; Transliteration: "Omimai Panikku!? Warugi wa Naitcha yo" (Japanese: お見舞パニック！？悪気はないっちゃよ)	Naoyuki Yoshinaga	Tokio Tsuchiya	Masahito Sawada	July 17, 1985	1016
Ran gets sick and asks Lum to come over by sending Lum exploding dolls, missiles and the like.
166	17	"Scary!! There is an Octopus on Shutaro's Head!?"; Transliteration: "Kowai!! Shūtarō no Atama ni Tako ga Irutcha!?" (Japanese: 怖い！！終太郎の頭にタコがいるっちゃ！？)	Directed by : Osamu Sekita; Storyboarded by : Futa Morita	Toshiki Inoue	Masami Abe	July 24, 1985	1101
An apparition of one of Shutaro's favorite octopuses appears on his head and cannot be removed.
167	18	"Invader From Space! Lum's Dangerous Lips!!"; Transliteration: "Uchū Kara no Shinryakusha! Ayaushi Ramu no Kuchibiru!!" (Japanese: 宇宙からの侵略者！あやうしラムの唇！！)	Iku Suzuki	Michiru Shimada	Masaaki Kannan	July 31, 1985	1102
A space centaur comes to Earth where he takes the guise of Ataru and tries to kiss every girl in school, but fails.
168	19	"Space Survival! They are the Eaters"; Transliteration: "Supēsu Sabaibaru! Kū no wa Yatsura da" (Japanese: スペースサバイバル！食うのは奴らだ)	Directed by : Osamu Sekita; Storyboarded by : Kazuo Yamazaki	Tokio Tsuchiya	Tsukasa Dokite	August 7, 1985	1103
On a spaceship near Earth, an alien is cleaning a special food bowl and drops it.
169	20	"It's Stimulating! Overhead Cooler of Terror!!"; Transliteration: "Shigekiteki Datcha! Kyōfu no Zujō Kūrā!!" (Japanese: 刺激的だっちゃ！恐怖の頭上クーラー！！)	Naoyuki Yoshinaga	Toshiki Inoue	Masami Abe	August 14, 1985	1104
It's a hot summer day, and the heat is bothering everyone except Lum.
170	21	"Love Raid! Romantic has Not Stopped!!"; Transliteration: "Ai no Shūgeki! Romanchikku ga Tomara Nai!!" (Japanese: 愛の襲撃！ロマンチックがとまらない！！)	Directed by : Osamu Sekita; Storyboarded by : Kazuo Yamazaki	Shigeru Yanagawa	Takafumi Hayashi	August 21, 1985	1105
Lum buys a plant that grows a little cupid. She then gets the cupid to try hitting Ataru with an arrow.
171	22	"Long-Time Appearance! Worries for Firefighter Mother!!"; Transliteration: "Hisa-Bisa Tōjō! Hikeshi no Haha ni Nayami Ari!!" (Japanese: ひさびさ登場！火消しの母に悩みあり！！)	Yoshihide Kuriyama	Shigeru Yanagawa	Masaaki Kannan	August 28, 1985	1106
Ten's mother visits and Jariten wants to give her a bouquet of carnations to show his love for her.
172	23	"Hardsell Happiness! Out of Pint Bluebird!!"; Transliteration: "Kōfuku Oshiuri! Pinto Hazure no Aoi Tori!!" (Japanese: 幸福押し売り！ピントはずれの青い鳥！！)	Iku Suzuki	Shigeru Yanagawa	Masahito Sawada	September 4, 1985	1107
An escaped alien convict, a bluebird, come to Tomobiki and begins to grant people's wishes.
173	24	"Great Storm! Ryunosuke's First Time Wearing a Swimsuit!!"; Transliteration: "Dai Haran! Ryūnosuke ga Hajimete Mizugi wo Kiru Toki!!" (Japanese: 大波乱！竜之介が初めて水着を着る時！！)	Naoyuki Yoshinaga	Michiru Shimada	Tsukasa Dokite	September 11, 1985	1108
Ryunosuke has a final showdown with her father. If she wins, she gets to wear her mother's bathing suit.
174	25	"I Want a Bride!! The Fox's Big Love Adventure!!"; Transliteration: "Hanayome ga Hoshī!! Kitsune no Koi no Dai Bōken!!" (Japanese: 花嫁がほしい！！キツネの恋の大冒険！！)	Iku Suzuki	Tokio Tsuchiya	Masaaki Kannan	September 18, 1985	1109
Kitsune comes to Tomobiki High School during a costume festival to see Shinobu.
SP2	25.5	"Ryoko's September Tea Party"; Transliteration: "Ryōko no 9-gatsu no Ochakai" (Japanese: 了子の9月のお茶会)	Directed by : Keiji Hayakawa, Mamoru Oshii, Junji Nishimura, Osamu Uemura, Kazuo Yamazaki, Naoyuki Yoshinaga & Iku Suzuki; Storyboarded by : Mamoru Oshii, Junji Nishimura, Osamu Uemura, Kazuo Yamazaki, Naoyuki Yoshinaga & Iku Suzuki	Kazunori Itō, Hiro Iwasaki, Michiru Shimada, Toshiki Inoue, Shigeru Yanagawa & Tokio Tsuchiya	Asami Endo, Kazuo Yamazaki, Takafumi Hayashi, Yuichi Endo, Tsukasa Dokite & Masahito Sawada	September 24, 1985	-
A special combining flashback footage with 15 minutes of new animation. This was originally released in fan conventions and was labeled in the United States as part of the OAV series.
175	26	"How Persistent! The Three Daughters' Great Animal Mission!!"; Transliteration: "Shitsuko Itcha! Sannin Musume no Dōbutsu Dai Sakusen!!" (Japanese: しつこいっちゃ！三人娘の動物大作戦！！)	Yoshihide Kuriyama	Hirohisa Soda	Takafumi Hayashi	September 25, 1985	1110
The three scamps from Lum's old school are trying to one-up Lum's gang again. This time, they choose animals to match each of the gang's individual weaknesses.
176	27	"Fast Money in Fast Fighting! Hamajaya's Forbidden Business"; Transliteration: "Osakana Tsuka Midori! Hamajaya no Ikenai Shōbai" (Japanese: お魚つかみどり！浜茶屋のイケナイ商売)	Osamu Sekita	Tokio Tsuchiya	Masahito Sawada	October 2, 1985	1111
Ryunosuke's father hatches a scheme to solve Hamachaya's finances while Mendou accidentally invites everyone to a beach outing.
177	28	"Wish Upon a Star! Ataru Family is Desire Panic"; Transliteration: "Hoshi ni Negai wo! Ataru Ikka wa Yokubō Panikku" (Japanese: 星に願いを！あたる一家は欲望パニック)	Naoyuki Yoshinaga	Shigeru Yanagawa	Naoyuki Yoshinaga	October 16, 1985	1112
After Ataru's father is hit by a semi, the Moriboshi family's financial situation grants them three wishes by a falling star.
178	29	"Kiss Courier! Darling's First Jealousy!"; Transliteration: "Kuchizuke Takkyūbin! Dārin Hajimete no Yakimochi!!" (Japanese: くちづけ宅急便！ダーリン初めてのヤキモチ！！)	Directed by : Iku Suzuki; Storyboarded by : Tatsuo Asuka	Shigeru Yanagawa	Masami Abe	October 23, 1985	1113
Lum receives a frog via special delivery, and intends to kiss him despite Ataru's objections.
179	30	"Osake is Scary! Sakura's Oharai Big Failure"; Transliteration: "Osake wa Kowai! Sakura no Oharai Dai Shippai" (Japanese: お酒はコワイ！サクラのおはらい大失敗)	Yoshihide Kuriyama	Shigeru Yanagawa	Taro Chokan	October 30, 1985	1114
Sakura is possessed by a spirit spirit in order to properly exorcise it, but is tempted to go binge drinking before she has the chance.
180	31	"It's Strange! Sakuranbo Yoga School!!"; Transliteration: "Bukimi Datcha! Sakuranbō Yoga Sukūru!!" (Japanese: 不気味だっちゃ！錯乱坊ヨガスクール！！)	Directed by : Osamu Sekita; Storyboarded by : Tsukasa Abe	Tokio Tsuchiya	Masaaki Kannan	November 6, 1985	1115
Sakura starts a yoga class, and the main characters all attend. They engage in "multiple-person yoga" to cleanse their souls, but it becomes a competition to see who'll "win."
181	32	"Farewell Onsen Sensei!? Tearful Farewell Marathon Tournament"; Transliteration: "Saraba Onsen Sensei!? Namida no Sōbetsu Marason Taikai" (Japanese: さらば温泉先生！？涙の送別マラソン大会)	Iku Suzuki	Shigeru Yanagawa	Masaaki Kannan	December 4, 1985	1116
Onsen is leaving, and Lum organizes a goodbye ceremony. Before he goes, he has unfinished business to attend to... namely revenge for all the students' hijinks over the years.
182	33	"Pure Love Sakura! Slippery Soap of Separation!?"; Transliteration: "Jun Ai Sakura! Wakare no Tsurutsuru Sekken!?" (Japanese: 純愛サクラ！別れのつるつるセッケン！？)	Osamu Sekita	Shigeru Yanagawa	Toshiko Sasaki	December 11, 1985	1117
Sakura must overcome Lum's home-made soap in order to be with her true love. He mistakes her slippery nature for disinterest in him.
183	34	"Asuka VS Big Brother! It's Battle for Certain Love!"; Transliteration: "Asuka TAI Onī-sama! Aru Ai no Tatakai Datcha!" (Japanese: 飛鳥VSお兄様！ある愛の闘いだっちゃ！)	Directed by : Yoshihide Kuriyama; Storyboarded by : Tsukasa Abe	Tokio Tsuchiya	Tsukasa Dokite	December 18, 1985	1118
Asuka will not stop flirting with her brother, so her mother makes a desperate wager with her: if he defeats in Asuka in combat, Asuka must give up on marrying him. Unfortunately, their respective martial abilities mean she's almost guaranteed a victory. Lum's help is employed. It gets weird.
184	35	"Darling Great Misfortune! Four Dimension Fortune of Fear!!"; Transliteration: "Dārin Dai Kyō! Kyōfu no Yon Jigen Omikuji!!" (Japanese: ダーリン大凶！恐怖の四次元おみくじ！！)	Makoto Moriwaki	Shigeru Yanagawa	Masaaki Kannan	December 25, 1985	1119
Lum and Ataru visit the shrine and make very different wishes, which both come true, in a way. Different dimensions are involved.
185	36	"New Years Panic! Mendo Family Human Sugoroku Tournament"; Transliteration: "Shin Shun Panikku! Mendō Ka Ningen Sugoroku Taikai" (Japanese: 新春パニック！面堂家人間すごろく大会)	Iku Suzuki	Tokio Tsuchiya	Kazuhiro Furuhashi	January 8, 1986	1120
The Mendo family uses the main characters as unwilling pawn-like pieces for a family game.
186	37	"Dreaming Ten-chan! Great Adventure at the End of the Rainbow!!"; Transliteration: "Yumemiru Ten-chan! Niji no Hate ni Dai Bōken!!" (Japanese: 夢みるテンちゃん！虹のはてに大冒険！！)	Directed by : Osamu Sekita; Storyboarded by : Tsukasa Abe	Toshiki Inoue	Masami Abe	January 15, 1986	1121
Ten is asked to retrieve an umbrella by a creature that lives in another dimension.
187	38	"Wanting to Date! Ataru's Great Test Mission"; Transliteration: "Dēto ga Shitai! Ataru no Tesuto Dai Sakusen" (Japanese: デートがしたい！あたるのテスト大作戦)	Directed by : Tomomasa Yamazaki; Storyboarded by : Koichiro Nakamura	Shigeru Yanagawa	Masaaki Kannan	January 22, 1986	1122
Shinobu makes a deal with Ataru that she'll go on a date with him if he comes in first on one of the upcoming exams. However, Ataru and studying don't mix, so he comes up with a crazy scheme to help him pass...
188	39	"Darling Said He Loved Me"; Transliteration: "Dārin ga Uchi wo Suki da to Ittatcha" (Japanese: ダーリンがうちを好きだと言ったっちゃ)	Iku Suzuki	Toshiki Inoue	Masahiko Imai	January 29, 1986	1123
Sakura makes medicine that Lum and Shinobu give to Mendo and Ataru. The medicine makes them delusional, but very creative.
189	40	"Death-Defying House Call! A Teacher Occupation Desperate too!!" Transliteration: "Kesshi no Katei Hōmon! Kyōshi Kagyō mo Inochigake!!" (Japanese: 決死の家庭訪問！教師稼業も命がけ！！)	Directed by : Osamu Sekita; Storyboarded by : Norio Kashima	Michiru Shimada	Hidetoshi Ōmori	February 5, 1986	1124
Onsen-mark must brave the families of some of his worst students in a round of home visits.
190	41	"Nonsense! Ran-chan's Huge Doll!!"; Transliteration: "Hachamecha! Ran-chan no Kyodai Ningyō!!" (Japanese: ハチャメチャ！ランちゃんの巨大人形！！)	Tsukasa Abe	Tokio Tsuchiya	Masaaki Kannan	February 12, 1986	1125
The main characters are forced to undergo meditation as punishment for their classroom disruption. Ran creates a giant doll that rampages through Tokyo like Godzilla.
191	42	"Love Ray! Bet Life Honest Fox!!"; Transliteration: "Koi Hitosuji! Inochi Kake Masu Junjō Kitsune!!" (Japanese: 恋ひとすじ！命かけます純情キツネ！！)	Jun'ichi Sakata	Shigeru Yanagawa	Atsushi Matoba	February 19, 1986	1126
The little fox that loves Shinobu hears a tale that implies that if you grab an Oni's horn, you will win your true love's heart.: Note: This is the last episode to air before the theatrical release of the fourth film Urusei Yatsura 4: Lum the Forever.
192	43	"Hurry Come Darling! Lum's Dangerous Marriage Story"; Transliteration: "Hayaku Kite Dārin! Ramu no Kiken na Kekkon Banashi" (Japanese: 早くきてダーリン！ラムの危険な結婚話)	Iku Suzuki	Michiru Shimada	Atsuko Nakajima	February 26, 1986	1127
Another suitor has swung in to Lum's life, and he's immune to electric shock.
193	44	"Not Bearable! Ran's Great Malicious Mission"; Transliteration: "Tamara Naitcha! Ran no Ijiwaru Dai Sakusen" (Japanese: たまらないっちゃ！ランの意地悪大作戦)	Directed by : Tomomasa Yamazaki; Storyboarded by : Tsukasa Abe	Toshiki Inoue	Kazuhiro Furuhashi	March 5, 1986	1128
Ran's latest revenge scheme involves a control button in an attempt to take over Ataru's life.
194	45	"Great All Star Banquet! We are Immortal!!"; Transliteration: "Ōru Sutā Dai Enkai! Uchira wa Fumetsu Datcha!!" (Japanese: オールスター大宴会！うちらは不滅だっちゃ！！)	Iku Suzuki	Shigeru Yanagawa & Iku Suzuki	Tsukasa Dokite	March 19, 1986	1130
Every character from the show makes an appearance as the school attempts a retelling of a classic Japanese tale.
SP3	-	"Memorial Album - I'm the Shuu-chan"; Transliteration: "Aimu za Shū-chan" (Japanese: アイム THE 終ちゃん)	Kazuo Yamazaki, Mamoru Oshii, Motosuke Takahashi, Osamu Uemura, Naoyuki Yoshinaga, Iku Suzuki & Junji Nishimura	Kazuo Yamazaki, Kazunori Itō, Hiroyuki Hoshiyama, Shigeru Yanagawa, Toshiki Inoue & Michiru Shimada	Kazuo Yamazaki, Asami Endo, Yuji Moriyama, Tsukasa Dokite, Takafumi Hayashi, Yuichi Endo, Noboru Furuse & Nobuyoshi Habara	September 15, 1986	-
The Mendou family's personal satellite narrates an overview of the family. Like the last special, this is also released in fan conventions originally and labeled in the United States as part of the OAV series.

== Reception ==
In 1982, the anime series ranked sixth in Animage magazine's reader-voted Anime Grand Prix. The following year, the show climbed to fourth place. In 1984, the film Urusei Yatsura: Only You took fifth and the TV anime took sixth. While the TV series did not appear in the 1985 Anime Grand Prix, the film Beautiful Dreamer came in third. In 1986, the show reappeared in sixth place and the third film Remember My Love took third place. In 1987, the series went down to eighth place. The series received two additional awards as part of the Anime Grand Prix. In 1982, its theme song "Lum no Love Song" was voted best anime song. In 1983, the sixty-seventh episode was voted best episode. In 2001, the staff of Animage listed the series as the thirtieth most important anime of all time. A 2019 NHK poll of 210,061 people saw Urusei Yatsura named Takahashi's fourth best animated work, with Beautiful Dreamer in fifth.

Christina Carpenter of THEM Anime Reviews praised the anime adaptation's characters and humor and noted the influence the series had on other series over the years. Carpenter summarized the series as an "Original and unapologetically Japanese classic that earns every star we can give" and awarded the series five stars out of five. In The Anime Encyclopedia: A Guide to Japanese Animation Since 1917, Jonathan Clements and Helen McCarthy viewed the anime as "a Japanese Simpsons for its usage of domestic humor and made note of AnimEigo's attention to providing notes for those unfamiliar with Japanese culture. They summarized the series as "a delight from beginning to end" that "absolutely deserves its fan favorite status." In reviewing AnimEigo's home video releases, Peter Nichols of The New York Times thought that the series was "relatively restrained" compared to their other releases. In a feature on the series for Anime Invasion, McCarthy recommended it as being "the first, the freshest and the funniest" of Takahashi's works and for its large cast, stories and use as a cultural and historical resource.

Writing in Anime from Akira to Princess Mononoke: Experiencing Contemporary Japanese Animation, Susan J. Napier dedicated several pages to discussion of the series, regarding it as "a pioneering work in the magical girlfriend genre." Napier contrasted the series to Western shows such as Bewitched and I Dream of Jeannie, highlighting their harmonious resolution to the chaos in comparison to Urusei Yatsura's "out of control" ending to each episode. Napier later compared the series to other magical girlfriend series such as Ah! My Goddess and Video Girl Ai. Fred Patten writing in Watching Anime, Reading Manga: 25 Years of Essays and Reviews credited the series with being the first program to inspire translations from fans. Patten also credited the series for introducing the phenomenon of using anime to advertise pop songs, claiming it was a deliberate decision by Kitty Films. Writing further about the series for the website Cartoon Research, Patten noted that the series was aimed at adults who could buy their own merchandise, as opposed to being subsidized by toy sales like many other shows at the time. Like Napier, Patten compared the series to Bewitched, but also to Sabrina the Teenage Witch.

== See also ==
- Urusei Yatsura (film series)
