= Lum's Love Song =

Single by Yuko Matsutani
- A-side: "Lum's Love Song"
- B-side: "Uchū wa Taihen da!"
- Released: October 21, 1981
- Genre: Anison
- Label: Canyon

Lum's Love Song (ラムのラブソング, Ramu no Rabu Songu) is the debut single of Japanese pop singer Yuko Matsutani. The single was released on October 21, 1981, and was created as the theme song for the anime series Urusei Yatsura. The song was used as the theme song from its debut on October 14, 1981, until the 77th episode released on July 20, 1983.

The song is also credited as "Urusei Yatsura's Theme" (うる星やつらのテーマ, Urusei Yatsura no Tēma), as it is registered by JASRAC. It has become an iconic anime theme and has been covered by various artists throughout both Japan and South Korea.

== Information ==
Lum no Love Song is the debut single by Japanese artist Yuko Matsutani. The single debuted as the theme song for the anime series Urusei Yatsura on October 14, 1981, and was released physically on record on October 21, 1981. The song was used for the anime until the 77th episode, released on July 20, 1983.

Both "Lum no Love Song" and the b-side, "Uchū wa Taihen da!" (宇宙は大ヘンだ!; lit. 'Space is Trouble!'), were written by composer Izumi Kobayashi. The lyrical portions of both tracks were written by Akira Itou.

"Lum's Love Song" is also credited as "Urusei Yatsura's Theme ~Lum's Love Song~" by JASRAC.

Various artists have covered the title track, including Tomoya Nagase, Koda Misono, Nana Kitade and South Korean girl group Orange Caramel. Koda Misono's cover version peaked at #10 on the Oricon Singles Chart.

== Track listing ==
CD
No.	Title	Lyrics	Music	Arranger(s)	Length
1.	"Lum no Love Song" (ラムのラブソング / Love Song of Lum)	Akira Itou	Izumi Kobayashi	Izumi Kobayashi	2:44
2.	"Uchuu wa Taihen da!" (宇宙は大ヘンだ! / Space is Trouble!)	Akira Itou	Izumi Kobayashi	Izumi Kobayashi	3:25
