= Tsukasa Dokite =

Japanese animator and character designer

Tsukasa Dokite (土器手 司), is a Japanese animator and character designer. He is particularly known for his work on 1980s anime, including Dirty Pair, Urusei Yatsura, Giant Gorg and Project A-ko.
