= Izumi Kobayashi (musician) =

Japanese musician and businesswoman (born 1957)

- 小林 泉美
- Born: 25 March 1957 (age 69); Funabashi, Japan
- Occupations: Singer; keyboardist; composer; record producer; business executive
- Children: 1
- Musical career
- Genres: City pop; fusion
- Instrument: Vocal
- Years active: 1977–present
- Labels: CBS/Sony; Nippon Phonogram; Kitty Records
- Formerly of: ASOCA; Parachute

Izumi Kobayashi (Japanese: 小林 泉美, Hepburn: Kobayashi Izumi; born 25 March 1957) is a Japanese musician, record producer, and business executive. Originally working for a funk band at a US military base, she formed the band ASOCA and won the EastWest '76 Best Keyboardist award, and she performed as a keyboardist for other musicians and bands. Working for CBS/Sony, she released several solo albums, either with the Mimie-Chan Super Band and its later iteration Izumi Kobayashi & Flying Mimi Band or solely with her own name. She also worked as a composer for Japanese media, including "Lum's Love Song" (the theme song for the Urusei Yatsura anime), and hosted TV Tokyo late-night show Rock in Japan. She later moved to London in 1985 and worked as a record producer and industry executive in Europe, serving as president of Cisco Records London.

== Biography ==
=== Early life and career ===
Izumi Kobayashi, a native of Funabashi, was born on 25 March 1957. She began taking piano lessons at the age of ten. She earned her first professional gig after performing at a Funabashi dance hall, and learning to play the Yamaha Electone, started securing performance gigs at restaurants, clubs, and similar venues. She also played for a funk band at a US military base, with its members including American musicians. She also studied at the Tokyo College of Music, graduating from the Department of Piano.

While studying at university, Kobayashi was a backing band member for Masatoshi Nakamura and a recording artist for artists like Hiroshi Tachi. In 1976, at the invitation of Yuichi Tokashiki—a fellow bandmate from the military base—she formed the band ASOCA. They competed in the Yamaha Music Foundation's EastWest '76 contest, where they won the Grand Prix and where she received the award for Best Keyboardist. As a keyboardist, she performed with fusion bands such as the Masayoshi Takanaka Band, Parachute, and T-Square, and has participated in live performances and studio recordings for artists including Miyuki Nakajima and Yumi Matsutoya. She also received offers to joined Parachute and T-Square full-time, doing so for only the former.

=== Solo career in Japan ===
Kobayashi was scouted by CBS/Sony music producer Yukitaka Mashimo and subsequently made her record debut with them in 1977. That same year, Kobayashi released her first album Orange Sky; she did the arranging in the album, a rare feat for debut artists. She was leader of the Mimie-Chan Super Band, which was renamed Izumi Kobayashi & Flying Mimi Band in 1978. Placed in CBS/Sony's idol division under producer Muneo Wakamatsu, she had her recordings there retracted from the company and sent to Nippon Columbia. She released four of her albums under her own name alone.

Kobayashi also worked in television dramas, films, and anime. One of the songs she composed was "Lum's Love Song", the theme song for the Urusei Yatsura anime; it subsequent went on to have numerous song covers and enjoy "popularity beyond the realm of anime songs". She performed "Dancing Star", one of the theme songs of the anime, and she performed "I, I, You & AI", the theme song of Urusei Yatsura: Only You; she had been signed to the anime's producer Kitty Records. While working as composer for one of the Ganbare!! Tabuchi-kun!! anime films, she had to write "as many as twenty songs in a single day". In addition to composition and arrangement for other artists, she has also worked in creating scores for orchestras. She was so busy with music that at one point she only had "one hour of sleep a night ... there were times when [she] was absolutely thrilled just to get three hours of sleep".

Outside of music, Kobayashi served as the host of TV Tokyo late-night show Rock in Japan, and was a columnist for magazines such as Keyboard Magazine and Sound & Recording Magazine.

=== Career in Europe and subsequent later career ===
In 1985, Kobayashi moved to London. She had decided to work in Europe at the advice of Holger Hiller, who later produced her 1989 album I-Ki. After her son's birth in 1988, she became less involved with performing as a musician due to the demands of raising a child. Her work subsequently included Mathilde Santing's album Breast and Brow, Swing Out Sister's singles Blue Mood and Breakout, and at least one German film, and she also worked with Depeche Mode and Stephen Duffy. She worked as an international business coordinator between Japanese and British record labels. She also worked as president of Cisco Records London, where she promoted the presence of Japanese artists in Europe; Mantanweb described her as "a bridge between the club music scenes of the United Kingdom and Japan".

Kobayashi spoke of her experiences on being an Asian expatriate in the United Kingdom:

To be honest ... I originally wanted to go to New York, not the UK. But I never received an invitation from New York. The great thing about the UK is that it values individuality; even if your technical skills aren't perfect, as long as you're unique—one of a kind—that's enough. Back then in the UK, being an Asian woman in that scene might have been considered something of a rarity. I don't think I would have been able to make a career in music if I had gone to New York; they tend to demand a much higher level of technical proficiency there"

Despite being busy working in Europe, Kobayashi still worked with Japanese media, serving as composer for the dramas Waru (1992) and Joi (1999). In the 2010s, she did studio scouting for a music project during her trips to Cuba. She returned to being a musician in 2016, performing for the African band The Scorpios. She also returned to anime music, composing a theme song for the 2020 anime Tokyo Gambo and covering a remix of "Lum's Love Song" as a vocalist.

=== Legacy and personal life ===
Kobayashi's work has also regained popularity due to the city pop wave, including both her solo work and Flying Mimi Band work. Her song "Coffee Rumba" appeared on the 2019 city pop compilation Pacific Breeze: Japanese City Pop, AOR and Boogie 1976–1986; Chris Ingalls of PopMatters called it an "eclectic mini-epic [which] bridges the gap between Prince-inspired funk and vintage synth-heavy Thomas Dolby". In November 2020, she held a concert at Blues Alley Japan in Meguro as part of Takashi Ikegami's City Pop Connection concert series; this was the first time in over three decades she had performed her own songs in Japan alongside her band. Her song appeared in the 2025 compilation album Crossover City: Mint Breeze; the album's producer Hitoshi Kurimoto explained that the "musical foundation of her song 'Palm St.' is rooted in authentic Latin fusion".

Kobayashi has a son with Hiller, musician Ken Kobayashi.

== Discography ==
=== Albums ===
Title	Details
Orange Sky (as Izumi Kobayashi & Flying Mimi Band)	Released: 1978; Label: Nippon Phonogram
Spoon Dance (as Izumi Kobayashi & Flying Mimi Band)	Released: 1978; Label: Nippon Phonogram
Sea Flight (as Izumi Kobayashi & Flying Mimi Band)	Released: October 1978
Coconuts High	Released: 1981; Label: Kitty Records
Nuts, Nuts, Nuts	Released: 1982; Label: Kitty Records
Tropicana	Released: 1983; Label: Kitty Records
Iki (stylized as i.Ki)	Released: 1989

=== Singles ===
Title	Details
My Beach Samba' 78	Released: 25 April 1978; Label: Nippon Phonogram
I, I, You & Ai	Released: 1982; Label: Kitty Records
Dancing Star	Released: 1983; Label: Kitty Records
Lazy Love (as Izumi "Mimi" Kobayashi & Tokyo Riddim Band; featuring Ras Tavaris)	Released: 14 August 2024; Label: Time Capsule

== Filmography ==
Year	Title	Role(s)	Ref(s)
1980	Ganbare!! Tabuchi-kun!!	Composer	
1980	Tonda Couple	Composer	
1983	Urusei Yatsura: Only You	Composer (with Masamichi Amano, Fumitaka Anzai, and Kōji Nishimura)	
