= Uru in Blue =

Film project by Gainax

Cover art of the 1998 Aoki Uru Frozen Designs Collection CD-ROM from Gainax, containing visual materials created for the uncompleted film project before production was put on hold in 1993. Cover illustration by the film's planned character designer and chief animation director, Yoshiyuki Sadamoto.

Uru in Blue (Japanese: 蒼きウル, Hepburn: Aoki Uru), also known as Blue Uru, is an unproduced Japanese animated science fiction film project by Gainax intended as a sequel to their 1987 film Royal Space Force: The Wings of Honnêamise. Aoki Uru was originally planned to be directed by Hideaki Anno and scripted by Hiroyuki Yamaga, with Yoshiyuki Sadamoto serving as its chief animation director and character designer. During 1992–93, the Aoki Uru creative team produced a complete storyboard, a partial script, and a large collection of designs and pre-production art for the film; however, the project had been initiated without a secured budget, and its development occurred within a period of personal, financial, and managerial crises at Gainax that contributed to the indefinite suspension of work on Aoki Uru in July 1993.

Aoki Uru co-producer Yasuhiro Takeda has argued that the themes and circumstances surrounding the film project influenced the creation of Anno's TV anime series Neon Genesis Evangelion, the planning for which began in the same month that Aoki Uru was put on hold. In the years following 1993, Gainax has made occasional announcements regarding a revival of the Aoki Uru concept, this time to be directed by Yamaga, with Sadamoto remaining attached to the project, including a multimedia proposal in the late 1990s, and the formal announcement of an English name for the film, Uru in Blue, at the 2013 Tokyo Anime Fair. In 2018, the Uru in Blue project was transferred from Gainax to Gaina, a different corporate entity and subsidiary of the Kinoshita Group, with the aim of a worldwide release of the film in 2022; an essay published at the end of 2022 described Yamaga as currently working on the project.

== Original proposal (1992–93) ==
Aoki Uru, a film proposal envisioned as a sequel to Royal Space Force, was first developed during a difficult period of transition for Gainax between 1991's Otaku no Video and the debut of Neon Genesis Evangelion in 1995; Hideaki Anno described this time in his life as being that of "a broken man who could do nothing for four years; a man who ran away for four years, one who was simply not dead." Although original company president Toshio Okada's involvement with his studio's creators stretched back more than a decade, as co-founder of both Gainax and its associated merchandising company General Products, as well as having personally provided the startup funding for Gainax predecessor Daicon Film, Yasuhiro Takeda described him as by 1991 having become a "hindrance" to Gainax creating "new and better anime." Okada had suggested that Gainax stop making anime in favor of its profitable PC games, whereas Takami Akai argued that it was Gainax's involvement with anime that gave it its foothold in the gaming industry. Takeda related an occurrence where Hiroyuki Yamaga had stormed out of a planning session on the studio's future after Okada arrived at the meeting to announce he would not resign, saying, "I can't even talk with him in the same room."

In a 1995 interview, Okada recalled having discussed with Yamaga a different sequel concept from Aoki Uru while attending the 1987 Star Quest event in Los Angeles; the idea involved a starship from the world of Royal Space Force—indicated by Okada to be in the Alpha Centauri system—that makes a journey to present-day Earth 100 years after the events of the first film. (Note: A sidebar in the Animerica interview with Okada noted there is no appearance of "extra" suns in Royal Space Force to suggest its world exists in a multiple star system as does Alpha Centauri, but nevertheless called the idea that the film took place around Earth's neighbor "truly intriguing.") (Note: In a 2010 memoir, Okada refers to this early sequel concept as Honneamise 2, with additional and slightly different details, describing Earth and the world of Royal Space Force as existing about six light years apart. A faction among Bandai's executives had remained interested in the project after the original film's release in Japan, and suggested to Gainax the possibility of a spinoff TV series. Yamaga and Okada discussed a plan for a 52-episode show, but Okada noted that a sequel film with the same budget as the original would be a considerably cheaper option than a year-long anime series. Bandai responded with the suggestion that 200 million yen could be allocated for such a movie sequel, much less than the original but taking into account the visual and soundtrack assets already developed for the first film that could be repurposed for a second. Okada relates that Bandai later asked if not one but two new Honneamise films could be made for 200 million yen; although regarding this proposal as mucha (completely unreasonable), he and Yamaga nevertheless liked the concept of making two movies at once, with Okada's idea that one film would show the events of the "first contact" from the perspective of the world of Royal Space Force, and the other film would show those events from the perspective of Earth. The story would end with a battle between the two sides; Okada was interested in the idea of depicting what a space war against aliens might look like if were to suddenly be fought today, using existing military technology rather than any futuristic weapons. As there was no actual budget ever forthcoming for Honneamise 2, no concept art or storyboards were made for the sequel concept, and Okada remarked that a day came when Bandai stopped talking about either a new film or TV series.) Gainax's next main anime projects, however, were Gunbuster (1988–89), Nadia: The Secret of Blue Water (1990–91), and Otaku no Video (1991); storyboarding work on the Aoki Uru concept did not commence until March 1992, the same month Okada, under continuing internal pressure, departed Gainax. Yamaga replaced Okada in his previous role within Gainax's co-presidency, now to be exercised between Yamaga and Takeshi Sawamura; in his memoir, Takeda characterized Yamaga's position as being the public face of the studio, while actual day-to-day operations were run by Sawamura, (Note: Takeda indicates this co-presidency arrangement with Sawamura predated the departure of Okada, whom he described in similar terms to Yamaga as having been "the company president...the face that we present to the public." Sawamura, however, had already assumed his own role as co-president in 1990, and Takeda notes an order by Sawamura to cut Okada's salary, shortly before the latter's resignation.) with final approval of projects controlled by Akai, whose Princess Maker had proved a major source of income for the company. Takeda noted the leadership conflict during this period continued even after Okada's departure, but now between Sawamura and Akai; Akai himself would resign in September 1994, a little over a year before the debut of Evangelion, although he would return to Gainax's board of directors in 2001.

Yoshiyuki Sadamoto, whose role on Aoki Uru was to be both character designer and chief animation director, commented that the 1992 origins of the sequel project followed the collapse of plans for Olympia, an anime Takeda describes as a "phantom project" for which Akai was the main creator, with Hideaki Anno slated as director. Yamaga felt that the difficulties the staff had found in drawing together around Olympia necessitated a return to the world of the original project for which the studio had been founded, in order to rediscover in it the qualities they wished to carry forward into a new generation of Gainax anime. Aoki Uru was to be set 50 years after Royal Space Force, on the reasoning that avoiding recurring characters or storylines from the original film would make the pitch easier for investors to understand. In a description by Sadamoto of the plot published in 1993, "Uru" was to be the name of the anime's protagonist, a former military pilot who had abandoned the armed forces and gone into hiding. Once the lover of a princess of Honnêamise's royal family, her abduction leads him to join a rescue team of four other elite pilots, each equipped with VTOL fighter jets and with their own individual reasons for taking on the mission. Sadamoto related that the anime would attempt to emphasize a visual experience of speed and intense aerial action scenes.

Aoki Uru was to be directed by Anno and written by Yamaga, who had completed the first of the planned four acts in the script; its primary mecha designs were drawn by Shirow Masamune, creator of Ghost in the Shell, and Kazutaka Miyatake of Studio Nue; although well known for his work on Macross, Miyatake had also designed several of the space battleships in Gunbuster. Aoki Uru was to use the same team of art directors as Gunbuster, Masanori Kikuchi and Hiroshi Sasaki; the later Aoki Uru Frozen Designs Collection contained a listing of staff who had been confirmed to work on Aoki Uru as of the end of 1992, including Kazuya Tsurumaki and Takeshi Honda as animation directors working under Sadamoto, while Aoki Uru's four technical directors included two of the three assistant directors of Royal Space Force (Shoichi Masuo and Shinji Higuchi), Otaku no Video director Takeshi Mori, and manga artist and illustrator Kenji Tsuruta, who would later make the character designs for Yamaga's 2002 Gainax TV series Magical Shopping Arcade Abenobashi. The task of drawing settei (design models) to guide the animators was to be assigned to Satoshi Kon, whose first work in the anime industry had been two years before as a background designer on 1991's Roujin-Z, directed by Royal Space Force veteran Hiroyuki Kitakubo; Kon had also served as background and layout artist on Mamoru Oshii's 1993 Patlabor 2. Following Patlabor 2, Kon had been sketching out a manga project, but to help meet his living expenses decided to join Gainax, who paid him a special retainer to reserve his services part-time to work on Aoki Uru. Kon recalled in 1999 that he had been told by those around him that he would be most unsuited to working at Gainax, but remarked that to his surprise he enjoyed working there.

The 1998 CD-ROM release of the designs from the 1992–93 Aoki Uru project affirmed Takeda's later statement that work began before the script was completed. The storyboard was created through a process that involved all the main staff going on a training retreat, where, in a series of meetings, they worked out a sequence of scenes for the entire film, from which Sadamoto then drew the complete storyboard. The exception to the process were the film's aerial action scenes, which were choreographed and then drawn for the storyboard by Anno. "Full-scale production work" on Aoki Uru was described as having begun in January 1993; by the end of the next six months Gainax had created over a thousand pieces of design art. In addition to the 338 images made for the film's storyboard, 50 pages of drawings were produced for the film's characters, 120 on its mecha, 30 on its "props" (small devices), 90 on its "art settings" (line drawings of an anime's "set designs" from which the actual background paintings are made), 21 "image boards" of concept art, and 370 "color boards," paintings representing concepts for how scenes should be colored. The CD-ROM introduction noted that the 370 color board total included two choices for each scene, one from each of Aoki Uru's two art directors, Kikuchi and Sasaki, who approached the task as a competition between themselves.

Takeda and Yamaga were listed as co-producers for Aoki Uru; however, Yamaga would later state that it was his intention to begin the project, then "hand it over to Anno to direct and Yasuhiro Takeda to produce." "I didn't know how to act, and to tell the truth, Aoki Uru had become something of a burden. I lacked motivation..." Takeda recalled. "I was just doing as I was told. Overall, I think I found producing Aoki Uru to be more of a chore than anything." The lack of progress on the project led Akai to threaten Takeda with severing "all ties with me, public and private," which led to a burst of effort toward satsfying Akai that Takeda compared to a mother and her grade school child "who'd barely finished his summer homework on the very last day of vacation." Takeda characterized a fundamental problem in that Aoki Uru was intended as a feature film on which Gainax had begun work without having yet secured the financing to actually finish it; even as they attempted to raise capital, Takeda was himself obliged to "take out a few poor man's loans" in order to cover staff salaries: "I went to I don't know how many loan sharks, and ended up securing some 8 million yen. As a result of borrowing money, however, my day-to-day existence would end up becoming rather pathetic..."

Aoki Uru was put on an indefinite production hold in July 1993. (Note: In contrast to Takeda's memoir, the 1998 Aoki Uru CD-ROM refers only to "various circumstances" that halted the production.) "We couldn't raise any more capital, and the staff just wasn't making any progress. Even Anno had lost his motivation. Anno, myself, and all the rest of the staff had worked so hard on this project, but we had nothing to show for it," recalled Takeda, who himself considered resigning over the situation, but was dissuaded by Sawamura. The financial crisis associated with the halt on Aoki Uru led to what Takeda described as a "mass exodus" of staff from Gainax after Sawamura announced to employees that in the near-term future he could not guarantee meeting their payroll; during this period Takeda's own salary was cut to the point where he could no longer afford an apartment, sending his wife, SF author Hiroe Suga, back to live with her parents while he slept in a small company bunkroom.

"For Anno," Takeda later wrote, "I think Aoki Uru being put on hiatus was a weight off his shoulders. I'm sure he'd been just as anxious about it as I was, tormented by the thought that as the director he needed to be doing something to fix things, even though he didn't know what to do." (Note: In 2002, Anno remarked of Takeda, "We all know we can rely on him...he's like our ultimate weapon. If Takeda can't do anything to help, then there's nothing that can be done. Whatever problem you've got, it's unsolvable.") During this time, Anno agreed to a sudden offer from Toshimichi Otsuki of King Records to produce a TV anime together, a proposal that would eventually be developed into the series Neon Genesis Evangelion. (Note: "Anno knew a guy from King Records named Otsuki, and as the story goes, the two were out drinking one day when Otsuki suggested to Anno that they work on an anime television project together. Anno agreed on the spot, came back to the office and promptly announced it to everyone. Nobody even batted an eyelash. We just accepted it without further thought.") Takeda speculated,

One of the key themes in Aoki Uru had been 'not running away.' In the story, the main character is faced with the daunting task of saving the heroine...He ran away from something in the past, so he decides that this time he will stand his ground. The same theme was carried over into Evangelion, but I think it was something more than just transposing one show's theme onto another. I really think Anno inherited something from Aoki Uru—the determination not to run away from problems—and what we saw in Evangelion was maybe just a reflection of those feelings. (Note: When asked in 2004 to state what had been "the biggest thing that happened" to him at Gainax, Anno cited two things: "the company managing to stay together" after the production of Royal Space Force, and "resisting the urge to resign from my job even after the Aoki Uru project was put on indefinite hold.)

== Multimedia plan (later 1990s) ==
In the years since the initial attempt to make Aoki Uru, Gainax has made periodic efforts to relaunch the project. Visiting the United States for Anime Expo 1996 shortly after Evangelion first aired on Japanese television, Hideaki Anno remarked, "Hiroyuki Yamaga is pretty serious as a matter of character, certainly—so he doesn't really think of compromising with the audiences. Therefore [Royal Space Force] wasn't a radical film from Yamaga's perspective. There's something like a sequel planned, but it's been stopped for now. Yamaga wants to make it 'the final anime of this century.' He wants to make it happen."

Although Okada and Yamaga had worked closely together to make Royal Space Force, its unproduced sequel became a point of argument between them in successive interviews with Animerica. The magazine's four-part discussion with Okada, conducted in 1995 at Otakon, concluded with an assertion that while still at Gainax, Okada had discussed and rejected the idea of making Yamaga's concept for Aoki Uru, on the grounds that "the story was almost exactly the same as [the 1984 film] Streets of Fire...Yamaga is a very clever and talented man. But even he couldn't come up with an idea he was really interested in, so instead he proposes this parody film." Okada maintained that this was the reason he had advocated that Gainax not make another anime film "for at least two years," until they had "the right emotion" behind it. Okada suggested during the interview that Animerica "some day" ask Yamaga himself about the issue; the magazine did so two years later during a talk conducted with Yamaga at FanimeCon in 1997.

Yamaga characterized Okada's view of Aoki Uru (translated in the interview as Blue Uru) as a misinterpretation: "As an otaku, he's the type of person who tries to get as much information as he can. He tries to find the minute details of a thing, and based on those details, he makes assumptions. That's where his mistakes come out." Streets of Fire was described by Yamaga as a conceptual inspiration for Aoki Uru, based on Takeda's fondness for the American movie and Yamaga's desire to motivate him as a producer, but only in the basic terms, said Yamaga, of "a cool hero goes to rescue the girl he loves...that was something Anno and Takeda were going to do. But now things have changed, and I'm doing Blue Uru, and that idea has been sort of swept away. From all that, I realize that a simple plotline, a guy rescuing a girl—from that baseline, you're allowed a lot of freedom. So the concept will probably remain in what I do, but it's not like it was based on any movie in particular."

Affirming Sadamoto's 1993 description of a film with an emphasis on speed, Yamaga contrasted Aoki Uru with his earlier movie project:

When I created [Royal Space Force], my goal was to make a world: You're there. You're walking through it. See all the details...20 people spent two years of work creating details of a world that could exist. This time around, I want to concentrate on speed. I mean, to the point you're going to be dizzy from how fast things are moving... (Note: Asked about future film projects in 1987 after the release of Royal Space Force, Yamaga had remarked, "I'd like to make films that make people dizzy. It's an intellectual kind of dizziness. If riding a roller coaster gives you vertigo of the physical kind, I feel that film can deliver entertainment through a sense of ideological vertigo," suggesting that whereas the ideas of Royal Space Force had been presented as a carefully constructed kaleidoscope, "I'd like to make a film that's more artsy and playful at the same time. The worlds depicted in films are organized and neat, but real life is more complicated and confused.")A rocket slowly climbed to the heavens, and there were all the details that were involved with that. This time, by contrast, things are going to be so fast...Speed is the focus of Blue Uru. I want to express everything in language that's skirting the boundaries of logic, yet gets the story across. What I want to do in Blue Uru is to take made-up words, slang, and line them up in an almost haiku way. I want to test the boundaries, the possibilities, of the Japanese language. It's kind of like the stuff Quentin Tarantino would spew out...it's profound in its own way. It's a bit difficult to explain.

The 1997 discussion with Yamaga appeared in Animerica over a year later in the May 1998 issue; the interview was accompanied by an additional sidebar featuring Yamaga's comments on the current status of Blue Uru, described by the magazine as one of Gainax's "new projects...nearing launch readiness." Yamaga further detailed Blue Uru as a multimedia project to be done in successive stages: first as a PlayStation video game, second, as a serialized web novel to be written by Yamaga, and third, as a manga adaptation to be done by the project's longtime concept artist, Yoshiyuki Sadamoto. The anime film itself would follow after the three stages; Yamaga cited a budget of two billion yen would be needed for extensive computer graphics, "mostly for 3-D backgrounds...The animation itself, its movement and design, will come out of the traditional anime industry. I plan to preserve the traditional look of anime in the film." Yamaga maintained his goal was not to make an anime that looked 3-D, but rather to use the approach for "emphasizing a sense of depth in a two-dimensional format," mentioning that he was researching the programs PowerAnimator and LightWave 3D to develop Blue Uru. Yamaga characterized the staged nature of the Blue Uru plan as "to a certain extent" a financing tactic:

In Japan—and I think this is true in a great many other countries as well, such as the United States—a great percentage of the rights to a project accrue to the people who are putting up the funds for it. (Note: In an interview conducted in 2003, Takeda remarked that when Gainax was planning Royal Space Force, there were people who asked whether they intended to secure rights in the work, but at the time it was more of a priority for Gainax to get the film made the way they wanted to than to insist on rights. Although Yamaga did retain the right to supervise the film, and Gainax was credited by Bandai for making it, Royal Space Force was financed through Bandai, to whom the contract gave 100% of the copyright; Takeda commented, "Contractually, [Royal Space Force] is not 'our thing.'") So by funding the project at any level by ourselves, that helps us secure the general rights to the material. We think it's important for us to keep as many rights as we can. If we begin with a project that we fund, then we have more say over what's done with it, and then if the project generates new funds, we can use those to create a larger project, and again, have more say in it.

In July 1998, Gainax released a CD-ROM entitled Aoki Uru Frozen Designs Collection containing the visual and script content created during the 1992–93 project, with a new commentary added as a QuickTime file. The commentary, in the form of a conversation between Yamaga and one of the intended technical directors of the earlier version of Aoki Uru, Kenji Tsuruta, expanded on Yamaga's reasoning behind the original film concept; as he had created a hero that suited Takeda as producer, he wished to have the film also suit Anno as director. Yamaga believed that Anno's personal template for a hero was Ultraman; in 1983 the two had made an amateur Ultraman movie together while at Daicon Film. (Note: Work on the film, Kaettekita Ultraman [The Return of Ultraman] had begun in May 1982 before production was temporarily halted in July of that year; the film was eventually completed in March 1983.) However, Yamaga also viewed Takeda's "cool hero" approach as not a good fit with the Ultraman ethic, so to make Aoki Uru compatible for Anno, Yamaga turned instead to the physical mode of the film's events, deciding to make Aoki Uru an aeronautic action story so that Anno could express his particular sensibility as an animator of objects at high speed and in mid-air.

In December 1998, Gainax released a compact disc EP featuring mixes of an instrumental Aoki Uru theme by Joujouka, an electronic group consisting at the time of DJ Tsuyoshi (Tsuyoshi Suzuki), Takeshi Isogai, and Minoru Tsunoda. Yamaga, a fan of Tsuyoshi's Goa trance music style, felt that it had the ideal "sense of speed and rapturousness" for the planned Aoki Uru PlayStation game, (Note: Although the Aoki Uru PlayStation game would not materialize, the following year Joujouka would contribute music to the PlayStation 2 game Rez.) and traveled to London to recruit the artist, who was then DJing at the club Return to the Source. In February and September 2000, Gainax released a first and second Aoki Uru Combat Flight Simulator Plane And Mission Module add-on for Microsoft Combat Flight Simulator utilizing plane designs from the staff of the 1992–93 anime project, as well as new ones contributed by artists including Neon Genesis Evangelion mecha designer Ikuto Yamashita, as well as Akira creator Katsuhiro Otomo and Maschinen Krieger creator Kow Yokoyama.

The year following the release of the Aoki Uru add-ons for Microsoft Combat Flight Simulator, Gainax announced that Yamaga's next projects would be the TV anime series Mahoromatic and Abenobashi, stating, "Hiroyuki Yamaga, as our director, has lurked for 14 years since his last great work, The Wings of Honnêamise." Two months later, however, a report on Gainax from the 40th annual national Japan Science Fiction Convention by Anime News Network indicated that in addition to Gainax having "all but confirmed" rumors at the event of a sequel to their 1988–89 anime Gunbuster, "Hiroyuki Yamaga's follow-up to The Wings of Honnêamise, Blue Uru, which has been in a state of limbo for 8 years now, seems set to be produced. Do not misunderstand, Gainax has not confirmed either of these sequels, but it would seem that they are seriously intent on producing them both." The Gunbuster sequel, Diebuster, would be released by Gainax three years later, in 2004.

== Uru in Blue (2013–) ==
On March 20, 2013, the opening day of that year's Tokyo International Anime Fair, Gainax displayed a teaser poster for the Aoki Uru film listing Hiroyuki Yamaga as director and screenwriter and Yoshiyuki Sadamoto as character designer. Joined by artist Range Murata, Yamaga and Sadamoto discussed the project during a talk that evening hosted by Osamu Kobayashi at the event space Asagaya Loft A. The following September, Gainax announced on their Facebook page that a pilot film for Aoki Uru would be released in 2014; during his guest appearance in San Mateo, California at the 2013 Japan Expo USA, Sadamoto commented in an interview with Anime News Network, "I'd like it to become as great a movie as Honnêamise. The film's main staff may also work on a manga adaptation that will be different from the movie. We're currently looking for business partners for the film."

In May 2014, during the Cannes Film Festival, Gainax promoted the film under the English-language title Uru in Blue, as an exhibitor at the Japan External Trade Organization booth. The following December at the Anime Festival Asia event in Singapore, Yamaga indicated that the pilot film, to be called "Overture," would be released in 2015 rather than 2014 as previously announced, and that the project was seeking to partner with possible production companies in Taiwan, South Korea, Singapore and the Middle East as well as Japan. Yamaga further related that Uru in Blue would not use the production committee system common to anime, but would instead pursue investors through a limited liability partnership based in Singapore; a budget of US$40 million was projected for the film, on which Yasuhiro Takeda would return to his original role as producer.

During a 2015 return visit to FanimeCon, Yamaga detailed the state of Uru in Blue, as well as its changes over time and his perspective on its protracted development: "You could almost say the longest part of this process was me finding myself in order to produce this movie...While many people have told me 'you've taken way too long on this project,' I feel like I've put in the perfect amount of time to make the best possible project," although the director also cited the success of Neon Genesis Evangelion as an explanation: "I would have liked to have started this project earlier, but the insane popularity of Evangelion spanning across two decades has kept delaying [it]." The director exhibited images from the "rebooted" version of the project; whereas the storyboards of the 1992–93 Aoki Uru proposal had been drawn by Sadamoto and Hideaki Anno, Yamaga displayed new storyboards drawn by himself, in addition to revised designs of the main character drawn by Sadamoto; Yamaga remarked that this protagonist had "changed dramatically since the original conception back in 1992."

The original Aoki Uru concept was intended to have no characters from Royal Space Force; Yamaga however suggested the possibility of their making cameos in Uru in Blue's future setting, although the film would be set in an "entirely different nation" from the first movie's Kingdom of Honnêamise. Yamaga described a "core concept" of Uru in Blue being that its main characters "are not noble knights, they're ruffians and thugs that come from pretty poor backgrounds" who conduct duels on behalf of gambling syndicates using fighter jets acquired as military surplus. The protagonist of the film is a 32 year-old professional duelist; Yamaga related that the character is modeled upon contemporary professionals in the anime industry itself, who "sacrifice a lot in their youth and 20s. They break their bodies trying to make anime, and once they start hitting their 30s, they reconsider if it's really worth being paid such a pittance and committing their life's blood, if it's worth doing this for the rest of their life."

At the 2015 Fanime panel, Yamaga had characterized traditional methods of anime funding as unprofessional and lacking in standards, and that the inability of Uru in Blue to find financing in Japan had prompted him to seek it in Singapore, as announced there in 2014. During a 2016 appearance at FicZone in Spain, Sadamoto acknowledged that the 2015 release date for Uru's "Overture" pilot film had already passed: "As I said before, it's something that depends on money. In this case, I'm really committed to the movie, I just love it. It is a slow process and lack of money is a real problem. Anyway, although I can not say anything about it right now, even if the current director leaves the project, I will stay involved in it."

In June 2017, following the loss by Gainax of a lawsuit for delayed royalties brought by Khara, a studio established by former Gainax director Hideaki Anno, Yamaga stated both that Gainax was undergoing restructuring, and that production work had begun on Uru in Blue. In July and August 2018, Gainax's Fukushima branch was acquired by the Kinoshita Group, a conglomerate known largely for its housing and real estate business, but which currently manages the festival Tokyo Filmex, and whose distribution arm, Kino Films, releases around 15 movies yearly. Renamed Gaina, (Note: Gaina means "big" in the local dialect of Yonago, the hometown of Gainax co-founder Takami Akai; in his memoir, Yasuhiro Takeda remarks that upon establishing the original Gainax in 1984, Akai and Yamaga had independently decided to use the Yonago expression in the company name, adding an "x" at the end "to make [it] look more like 'the name of an anime robot.'" Takeda noted however that as used in Aichi, "gaina means 'rowdy' or 'loose cannon'...Rather funny, because that's not too far from the mark, either...") the anime division of the former Fukushima Gainax was relocated to Koganei in Tokyo. The following September, Gaina announced that it would take over production on Uru in Blue, "aiming for a worldwide release for the anime in 2022". An essay on the topic of civilization by Yamaga appearing in the December 22, 2022, issue of Niigata Keizai Shimbun described him as "currently working" on the project.

Gainax filed for bankruptcy in 2024 and was officially dissolved on December 11, 2025. Gigazine stated the film "may never be released" as a result.
