= Neon Genesis Evangelion =

Japanese anime television series

Japanese name
- Kana: 新世紀エヴァンゲリオン
Transcriptions
- Revised Hepburn: Shin Seiki Evangerion
- Type: TV series
- Genre: Apocalyptic; Mecha; Psychological drama
- Created by: Gainax (Note: Planning and original story. As of 2025, the show's director Hideaki Anno is credited in that position and all references to Gainax are removed in current Japanese rebroadcasts.)
- Directed by: Hideaki Anno
- Character designer: Yoshiyuki Sadamoto
- Music by: Shirō Sagisu
- Country of origin: Japan
- Original language: Japanese
- No. of episodes: 26 (list of episodes)

Production
- Studios: Tatsunoko Production; Gainax
- Producers: Noriko Kobayashi (TV Tokyo); Yutaka Sugiyama (NAS)
- Production companies: TV Tokyo; NAS

Original release
- Network: TXN (TV Tokyo)
- Release: October 4, 1995 – March 27, 1996

Neon Genesis Evangelion (Japanese: 新世紀エヴァンゲリオン, Hepburn: Shin Seiki Evangerion; lit. 'New Century Evangelion' in Japanese and lit. 'New Beginning Gospel' in Greek), also known as simply Evangelion or Eva, is a Japanese anime television series produced by Gainax and Tatsunoko Production, and directed by Hideaki Anno. It was broadcast on TV Tokyo and its affiliates from October 1995 to March 1996. The story, set in 2015, fifteen years after a worldwide cataclysm in the futuristic fortified city of Tokyo-3, follows Shinji Ikari, a teenage boy who is recruited by his father Gendo Ikari to the mysterious organization Nerv. Shinji is tasked to pilot an Evangelion, a giant biomechanical mecha, to fight and destroy beings known as Angels.

The series has been described as a deconstruction of the mecha genre; it delves into the experiences, emotions, and mental health of the Evangelion pilots and Nerv members as they are called upon to understand the ultimate cause of events and the motives behind human action. The series features archetypal imagery derived from Shinto cosmology and mystical Judeo-Christian religions and traditions, including Midrashic tales and Kabbalah. The psychoanalytic accounts of human behavior put forward by Sigmund Freud and Carl Jung are also prominently featured.

Neon Genesis Evangelion received acclaim from critics and audiences and is regarded as one of the greatest animated series of all time; however, its final two episodes drew controversy, as many viewers found the ending confusing and abstract. Gainax attributed the episodes' abstract style both to the severe time constraints imposed by the production schedule and to Anno's deliberate artistic choice. In 1997, Gainax released a remake of the last two episodes in the feature film The End of Evangelion, written and co-directed by Anno. A series of four films, Rebuild of Evangelion, retelling the events of the series with different plot elements and a new ending, were released between 2007 and 2021. Evangelion has had a profound influence on the anime industry and influenced numerous future works. Films, manga, home video releases, and other products in the franchise have achieved record sales in Japanese markets and strong sales in overseas markets, with related goods earning over ¥150 billion by 2007 and Evangelion pachinko machines generating ¥700 billion by 2015.

== Plot ==
In 2015, 15 years after a global cataclysm known as the Second Impact, teenager Shinji Ikari is summoned to the futuristic city of Tokyo-3 by his estranged father Gendo Ikari, who is the director of the special paramilitary organization Nerv. Shinji witnesses United Nations forces battling a giant creature named Sachiel, one of a race of monstrous beings known as Angels whose awakening was foretold in the Dead Sea Scrolls. Because of the Angels' near-impenetrable force fields known as Absolute Terror Fields, or simply AT Fields, Nerv's Evangelion bio-mechanical mechas, which are synchronized to their pilots' nervous systems and possess their own force fields, are the only weapons capable of combating and destroying the Angels. Nerv officer Misato Katsuragi escorts Shinji into the Nerv complex beneath Tokyo-3, where Gendo pressures him into piloting Evangelion Unit-01 to fight the Angel. Without training, Shinji is unable to destroy it, and Unit-01 suffers cranial damage. Because of the nervous system synchronization, Shinji is overwhelmed by the pain and loses consciousness, causing the Evangelion to go berserk and savagely kill the Angel on its own.

Following hospitalization, Shinji moves in with Misato and settles into life in Tokyo-3. In his second battle, Shinji defeats the Angel Shamshel but runs away afterward, distraught. Misato confronts Shinji, and he decides to remain a pilot. Shinji and Nerv's crew must defeat the remaining fourteen Angels to prevent the Third Impact, a global cataclysm that would destroy the world. Evangelion Unit-00 is repaired shortly afterward, and Shinji tries to befriend its pilot Rei Ayanami, a mysterious and socially isolated teenage girl. With Rei's help, Shinji defeats the Angel Ramiel. They are joined by Evangelion Unit-02's pilot, the multitalented, fiery-tempered teenager Asuka Langley Soryu, who is German-Japanese-American. The three of them manage to defeat several Angels, and as Shinji adjusts to his new role as a pilot, he gradually becomes more confident and self-assured. Asuka moves in with Shinji, and they develop a complicated relationship with each other, which includes confused romantic attraction and a kiss at Asuka's provocation.

After being absorbed by the Angel Leliel, Shinji breaks free thanks to Eva-01 acting on its own. He is later forced to fight Evangelion Unit-03, which has become infected by the Angel Bardiel, and its pilot, his friend and classmate Toji Suzuhara, becomes incapacitated and permanently disabled. Asuka loses her self-confidence following a defeat, which is worsened by her next fight against the Angel Arael, who psychologically attacks her mind. It forces her to relive her worst fears and childhood trauma, resulting in a severe mental breakdown. In the next battle, Rei sacrifices herself to self-destruct Unit-00 and save Shinji. Misato and Shinji visit the hospital, where they find Rei alive, but claiming she is "the third Rei". Misato forces the scientist Ritsuko Akagi to reveal the dark secrets of Nerv, the Evangelion boneyard, and the Dummy Plug system, which operates using clones of Rei, who was created using the DNA of Shinji's mother, Yui Ikari. Kaworu Nagisa replaces the catatonic Asuka as Unit-02's pilot and befriends Shinji, gaining his trust. He is revealed to be the final foretold Angel, Tabris, and fights Shinji, realizing that he must die to allow humanity to survive. He asks Shinji to kill him, who hesitates but eventually kills Kaworu. This succession of events causes Shinji to be overwhelmed with guilt, leaving him emotionally scarred and alienated from the rest of the characters.

After the final Angel is defeated, Gendo triggers the "Human Instrumentality Project", a forced evolution of humanity in which the souls of humankind are merged for benevolent purposes. He believes that if unified, humanity could overcome the loneliness and alienation that have plagued them. Shinji's soul grapples with the reason for his existence and experiences an epiphany that he needs others to thrive and to accept himself by seeing a potential Shinji in another reality. This enables him to destroy the wall of negative emotions that torment him and unite with the others, who congratulate him.

== Characters ==
In the development of Evangelion, Hideaki Anno attempted to create characters that reflected parts of his own personality. The characters of Evangelion struggle with interpersonal relationships, personal problems, and traumatic events in their past. The human qualities of the characters have enabled some viewers of the show to identify with the characters on a personal level, while others interpret them as historical, religious, or philosophical symbols.

Shinji Ikari is the series protagonist and the designated pilot of Evangelion Unit-01. After witnessing his mother Yui Ikari's death as a child, Shinji is abandoned by his father, Gendo Ikari. He is emotionally hypersensitive and sometimes does as expected out of fear of rejection, but he has often rebelled and refused to pilot the Eva because of the excruciating harm that has been done to him or to his friends. Throughout the series, he says to himself "I mustn't run away" as a means of encouraging himself to face the imminent threat, and this sometimes actually gives him bravery in battle; however, he has a lingering habit of withdrawing in response to traumatic events. Anno has described Shinji as a boy who "shrinks from human contact" and has "convinced himself that he is a completely unnecessary person". In an interview, Anno further clarified that Shinji's motto, "I mustn't run away", should not be understood as either the series' theme or a positive exhortation. According to Anno, the series does not advocate refusing to run away, as the final episodes explicitly tell Shinji that it is acceptable to flee from unpleasant situations; instead, its central theme is making a choice rather than remaining in a state of limbo akin to death. Assistant director Kazuya Tsurumaki also concluded Shinji is not as weak as is commonly perceived; he is obstinate and "doesn't really pay attention to other people", just like Anno.

The cast of Neon Genesis Evangelion as depicted on the Japanese "Genesis" (volume) 14 LaserDisc and VHS cover

The withdrawn and mysterious pilot of Evangelion Unit-00, Rei Ayanami, is a clone made from the salvaged remains of Yui and is plagued by a sense of negative self-worth stemming from the realization that she is an expendable asset. She at first despises Shinji for his lack of trust in his father Gendo, with whom Rei is very close. However, after Shinji and Rei successfully defeat the Angel Ramiel, she takes a friendly liking to him. Towards the end of the series, it is revealed that she is one of many clones, whose use is to replace the currently existing Rei if she is killed.

Asuka Langley Soryu is a child prodigy who pilots Evangelion Unit-02 and possesses a fiery temper and an overabundance of pride and self-confidence, which often gets her in trouble and difficulty, especially during battles. As a little girl, Asuka discovered the body of her mother shortly after she committed suicide, leading the child to repress her emotions and vow never to cry. Asuka and Shinji develop intense but ambiguous feelings toward each other and have difficulty reaching out to others. Their relationship was initially modeled on the one between Jean and Nadia in the earlier anime series Nadia. Similarly to Shinji, Asuka and Rei are presented with their own flaws and difficulty relating to other people.

Misato Katsuragi is the caretaker and commanding officer for Shinji and Asuka. Her professional demeanor at Nerv contrasts dramatically with her carefree and irresponsible behavior at home. Character designer Yoshiyuki Sadamoto conceived her as an older "girl next door" and promiscuous loser who failed to take life seriously. Hideaki Anno described Shinji and Misato as "afraid of being hurt" and "unsuitable—lacking the positive attitude—for what people call heroes of an adventure."

The teenage Evangelion pilots are ordered into battle by the steely Gendo Ikari, Shinji's father and the commander of Nerv. He abandoned Shinji and recalled him only to serve as an Evangelion pilot. Gendo salvaged the remains of his dead wife's body to create Rei, whom he viewed as a mere tool at his disposal to defeat the Angels and enact Instrumentality. Similar to Shinji, he is somewhat asocial and is afraid of being insulted by others and often runs away from such, often committing immoralities in the process. This fear is also what drove him to abandon Shinji. He is depicted as relentless in his drive to win, a man who "takes drastic and extreme measures, by fair means or foul, or by hook or by crook, in order to accomplish his own purpose." According to character designer Yoshiyuki Sadamoto, the characters of Gendo and Fuyutsuki are based on Ed Straker and Alec Freeman of the television series UFO. Sadamoto designed the visual appearance of the characters so that their personalities "could be understood more or less at a glance". The distinctive aesthetic appeal of the female lead characters' designs contributed to the high sales of Neon Genesis Evangelion merchandise. The design of Rei, in particular, became so popular that the media referred to the character as "Premium Girl" due to the high sales of books with Rei on the cover.

== Production ==
Director Hideaki Anno fell into a depression following the completion of work on Nadia: The Secret of Blue Water and the 1992 failure of the Royal Space Force: The Wings of Honnêamise sequel project, Uru in Blue. According to Gainax co-founder and director Yasuhiro Takeda, after the failure of Uru in Blue, Anno agreed to a collaboration between King Records and Gainax as he drank with King representative Toshimichi Ōtsuki; King Records guaranteed Anno a time slot for "something, anything". Anno began the development of the new series in 1993 around the notion of not running away, the underlying theme of Uru in Blue, focusing on a protagonist accustomed to avoiding personal responsibility who finds himself trying to save the heroine of the story. Early into the production, he stated his intent was to have Evangelion increase the number of anime fans, named otaku in Japanese, and attract interest in the anime medium, along with bringing a breath of fresh air to the mecha genre. In the early design phase of the Evangelion project, several formats were considered, including a film, a television series, and an original video animation (OVA) series. The producers finally opted for the television series, as it was the most widely accessible medium in Japan at that time. Anno also originally proposed the title Alcion for the new series, but this was rejected due to its lack of hard consonant sounds. He conceived the series as a metaphor of his four-year depression, as he tried to put his whole self and imprint his own feelings into the work.

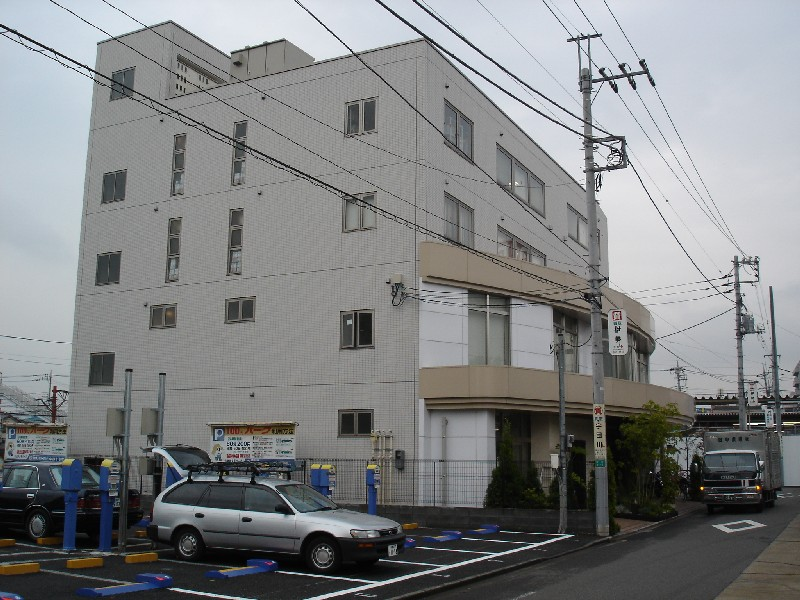
Former Gainax studio in Koganei, Tokyo

Critics noted how Evangelion borrowed certain scenarios and the use of introspection as a narrative device from a previous Anno project, the OVA series Gunbuster. Anno also incorporated the narrative structure of Nadia and multiple frames of reference, leaving the story open to interpretation. The production was complex and saw several changes to the scenario initially conceived by Gainax. Anno initially suggested that the series featured a girl as the main protagonist, but the idea was rejected by character designer Yoshiyuki Sadamoto, who felt that a male lead would make it more believable for the mecha genre. In the first scenario, the first episode presented the battle between an Angel and Rei, while the character of Shinji was only introduced after the Angel had been temporarily defeated. Further changes to the plot were made following the Aum Shinrikyo sect's sarin gas attack on the Tokyo subway in March. Cultural critic Hiroki Azuma has said that the original Evangelion story was "too close to reality" from Anno's point of view. Anno thought that the original scenario was not suitable for broadcasting, and he feared censorship. However, he also criticized Aum Shinrikyo, because "they lost any contact with reality". For this reason, Azuma stated that Evangelion "is an intrinsic critique of Aum".

The final version of the story reflects inspiration drawn from numerous other anime and media. Chief among these are Space Battleship Yamato, Mobile Suit Gundam, Devilman and Space Runaway Ideon. The series also incorporates tributes to Childhood's End, the novels of Ryū Murakami, The Andromeda Strain, The Divine Invasion, the poem Pippa Passes, the film The Hitcher, and several television series including The Prisoner, Thunderbirds, Ultraman, and Ultraseven. Director Anno himself stated he took inspiration from Hayao Miyazaki's movie Nausicaä of the Valley of the Wind (1984). He had worked on the film as an animator for the God Warrior scene and also mentioned the manga as a significant influence on Neon Genesis Evangelion. For the concept of organic robots with a capsule-shaped cockpit filled with liquid, the creators instead drew inspiration from Fight! Iczer One.

The development of the Neon Genesis Evangelion series ran close to deadlines throughout its production run. The initial cuts of the first two episodes were screened at the second Gainax festival in July 1995, only three months before they were aired on television. From the very first episode, Gainax worked under constant time pressure because of repeated production delays. By the time the series premiered on TV Tokyo, the staff had completed only twelve episodes in nearly two years and therefore had to produce the remaining fourteen in roughly one-third of that time. By the thirteenth episode, "Lilliputian Hitcher", the series began to deviate significantly from the original story, and the initial project was abandoned. The number of Angels was reduced to seventeen from the original twenty-eight. The writers also changed the story's ending, originally describing the failure of the Human Instrumentality Project after an Angel attack from the Moon. Not only did the series suffer from scheduling issues, but according to Anno, despite Gainax being the lead studio for the series, the company itself had inadequate materials and staff for the full production of the series. Only three staff members from Gainax were working on the series at any given time, and most of the series's production was outsourced to Tatsunoko Production.

Starting with the sixteenth episode, "Splitting of the Breast", the show undergoes a drastic change, discarding the grand narrative concerning salvation for an intricate exploration of the lead characters' psyches. This change coincided with Anno's development of an interest in psychology after a friend lent him a book on mental illness. This focus culminated in the two final episodes filmed from a completely introspective perspective. Limits of time due to the production schedule forced Anno to abandon the script of the twenty-fifth episode to work with a new one. Assistant director Masayuki created the twenty-fourth episode in just three weeks amid chaotic production conditions, while the final two episodes were completed in only a few days. These episodes feature heavy use of abstract animation, flashbacks, simple line drawings, photographs, and still image scenes with voice-over dialogue. Some critics speculated that these unconventional animation choices resulted from budget cuts, but Toshio Okada stated that it was not only a problem of schedule or budget, since Anno "couldn't decide the ending until the time came. That's his style". These two episodes sparked controversy and criticism among fans and critics of the series alike; In 1997, Hideaki Anno and Gainax thus released two animated feature films providing a remake of the last two episodes named Death & Rebirth and The End of Evangelion, the latter being a more traditional, narrative-based ending. Over the years, Gainax has repeatedly defended the series' original ending, arguing that the theatrical conclusion was unnecessary. The staff has also emphasized that The End of Evangelion, with its dark and violent tone, was conceived that way from the outset rather than as a response to criticism of the original ending.

== Themes ==
The cross-shaped explosion caused by the destruction of the third Angel in "The Beast" exemplifies the use of Christian imagery in Evangelion.

References to mystical traditions in Judaism and Christianity, including Midrashic literature and Kabbalah, are threaded liberally through the series. Complicating viewers' attempts to form an unambiguous interpretation, the series reworks Midrash stories, Zohar images and other Kabbalistic ideas developed from the Book of Genesis to create a new Evangelion-specific mythology. The plot also combines elements of esotericism and mysticism of the Jewish Kabbalah, including the Angels, which have common and individual features with the angels of the religious tradition, such as Sachiel, Sandalphon and Ramiel. Assistant director Kazuya Tsurumaki stated the religious visual references were intended to make the series more "interesting" and "exotic" for a Japanese audience, denying the existence of a religious meaning for the use of Christian visual symbols in the show. According to Anno, "as the symbols are mixed together, for the first time something like an interrelationship or a meaning emerges". According to scholar Gavin McDowell, Tsurumaki's remarks, which have often been quoted out of context in Evangelion fandom, do not imply that the individual references are devoid of meaning.

According to writer Patrick Drazen, numerous allusions to the Kojiki and the Nihongi play a prominent role in Evangelion, along with the Shinto vision of the primordial cosmos and the mythical lances of the Shinto deities Izanagi and Izanami. Elements of the Judeo-Christian tradition also feature prominently throughout the series, including references to Adam, Lilith, Eve, the Lance of Longinus, the Dead Sea Scrolls, the Kabbalistic concept of Adam Kadmon, and the Tree of Life. The merging of all human souls into one through the Human Instrumentality Project at the end of the series has been compared to the Kabbalistic concept of tikkun olam. The Evangelions have been likened to the golem of Jewish folklore, and their visual design resembles the traditional depictions of oni, Japanese demons or ogres.

Neon Genesis Evangelion has been interpreted as a deeply personal expression of Hideaki Anno's own emotional struggles with depression. During the production of the series, he became interested in mental illness and psychology. According to Anno himself, his original plan envisioned Rei as a schizophrenic character and the "unconscious Shinji". Shinji has an Oedipus complex towards her and is characterized by a libido-destrudo conflict. Similarly, Ritsuko has an Electra complex, in which she loves Gendo, a sort of substitute for her father figure. Anno himself stated that he identifies with Shinji in both a conscious and unconscious manner, while Rei is Anno's "deepest part" and Kaworu his Jungian shadow. Shinji's entering into Unit-01 has been interpreted as a Freudian "return to the womb", and his struggle to be free of the Eva as his "rite of passage" into manhood. The series also contains references to philosophical and psychoanalytic concepts, such as the oral stage, introjection, oral personality, ambivalence, and the death drive, including elements of the works of Sigmund Freud, Arthur Schopenhauer, and Søren Kierkegaard.

== Related media ==
=== Films ===
In May 1996, Gainax announced an Evangelion film in response to fan dissatisfaction with the series finale. On March 15, 1997, Gainax released Neon Genesis Evangelion: Death & Rebirth, consisting of sixty minutes of clips taken from the first twenty-four episodes of the series for the segment Death, while Rebirth served as a preview of the theatrical finale, a remake of the series' final two episodes. The second film, The End of Evangelion, which premiered on July 19, 1997, provided the complete theatrical ending as a retelling of the final two episodes of the television series. Rather than depicting the series's climax within the characters' minds, the film provides a more conventional, action-based resolution to the series's plot lines. The film won numerous awards and grossed ¥1.45 billion within six months of its release. Ex.org ranked the film in 1999 as the fifth best "All-Time Show", with the television series ranked second. In 2009, CUT magazine ranked it the third greatest anime film of all time. In July 1998, the films were re-released as Revival of Evangelion, which combined with a new version of Death, named Death (True)², with The End of Evangelion.

In February 2003, ADV and Gainax signed a contract that allowed for the potential development, production, financing, and exploitation of at least three live-action theatrical films, five television programs, and three direct-to-video movies. In 2010, ADV paid US$100,000 to acquire the series's copyright for the purpose of producing a live-action film. Gainax later attempted to modify the agreement. On July 27, 2011, ADV sent a letter to Gainax requesting a refund, but Gainax argued that it retained the right to veto any financing it deemed unacceptable. In August 2011, ADV filed a lawsuit against Gainax. In 2015, Evangelion: Another Impact, a 3D-rendered short film directed by Shinji Aramaki that served as a collaboration between the Khara studio and the media company Dwango, was released and streamed as the twelfth anime short from the Japan Animator Expo on February 8. It depicts "the story of an Evangelion's activation, rampage and howling in another world".

A new animated film series called Rebuild of Evangelion by Gainax was also made, consisting of four films. The first film retells the first six episodes from the series, but from the second film onward, the story changes, introducing new characters, Evas and Angels. The first film, Evangelion: 1.0 You Are (Not) Alone, was released in Japan on September 1, 2007, with Evangelion: 2.0 You Can (Not) Advance released on June 27, 2009, and Evangelion: 3.0 You Can (Not) Redo released on November 17, 2012. The final film, titled Evangelion: 3.0+1.0 Thrice Upon a Time, was released on March 8, 2021, after two delays. On August 13, 2021, Prime Video streamed Evangelion: 3.0+1.01 Thrice Upon a Time for the first time outside of Japan, together with the three previous Rebuild films. According to Hideaki Anno, the movie was released overseas on streaming as an alternative to movie theaters due to the COVID-19 pandemic. The movies were dubbed in 10 languages and released in over 240 countries, and it became the most viewed first-day release for the platform in Japan.

=== Manga and books ===
Ten months prior to the television broadcast of Evangelion, character designer Yoshiyuki Sadamoto illustrated a manga version of the story, initially a supplement meant to promote the anime series. The first installment of the manga was published in the February issue of Shōnen Ace in December 1994, with subsequent installments produced on an irregular basis over an eighteen-year period. The final installment was published in June 2013. Several publishers were initially concerned at the selection of Sadamoto to develop the manga adaptation, viewing him as "too passé to be bankable". The first ten volumes sold over 15 million copies, and the eleventh volume reached number one on the Tohan charts, selling an additional two million copies. The manga series won the 1996 Comicker fan manga poll. The story has been adapted into several other manga series in addition to the original Sadamoto project, including Campus Apocalypse, a mystery story that omits the Evangelion units, and Petit Eva: Evangelion@School, a parody series which received its own original net animation serial show.

=== Music and soundtracks ===
Shirō Sagisu composed most of the original music for the series. The soundtracks released to high rankings on the Oricon charts, with Neon Genesis Evangelion III reaching the number one slot for highest sales in 1997; that same year, Sagisu received the Kobe Animation award for "Best Music Score" for his work on Evangelion. Classical music by Ludwig van Beethoven, Johann Sebastian Bach, Giuseppe Verdi and George Frideric Handel is also featured throughout the series and the movies.

Additional classical works and original symphonic compositions were used to score later movies produced within the Neon Genesis Evangelion franchise. In total, the series's discography includes twenty-one full studio, live, compilation and soundtrack albums and six CD singles. The series's opening theme is "A Cruel Angel's Thesis", performed by Yoko Takahashi. It ranked on two TV Asahi polls, reaching the 55th spot for best anime theme songs of all time, and 18th for best anime theme songs of the 1990s. Fifteen years after its release, the theme won JASRAC's annual award for the royalties it continues to generate from its usage in pachinko, pachislo, karaoke and other venues. The ending theme of the series is "Fly Me to the Moon", sung by Claire Littley and various other singers from the main vocal cast.

=== Video games ===
Several video games based on the series have been developed, ranging from RPG and adventure games to mahjong and card games. The series has also spawned visual novels, two of which inspired the romance and comedy-focused manga series Angelic Days and Shinji Ikari Raising Project.

== Releases ==
=== Japan ===
The original home video releases in Japan included VHS and LaserDisc sets using a release structured around "Genesis 0:(volume number)", with each of the first twelve releases containing two episodes each. Each of the episodes received minor changes and episodes from the twenty-first to the twenty-fourth were extended with new scenes. "Genesis 0:13" and "Genesis 0:14" contained the original and the alternate versions of the last two episodes first presented in Neon Genesis Evangelion: The End of Evangelion. A fifteenth and final release for LaserDisc, entitled "Genesis 0:X", contained the broadcast versions of the episodes from the twenty-first to the twenty-fourth and was a special mail-in offer for fans who purchased all fourteen discs. The first Japanese DVD release was spread across seven volumes; all contained four episodes, with the seventh volume containing both the original and alternate versions of the last two episodes. This version was identical to the previous LaserDisc and VHS release. The movies were also released as a special set, just like before. In 2000 and 2001, three box sets were released to commemorate the fictional Second Impact, which occurred in the year 2000 in the series. The Second Impact Box contained the original episodes and both movies on nine DVDs – three per Box. The versions were the original broadcast and theatrical versions respectively and therefore differed from the previous DVD release. In addition, the video game Girlfriend of Steel was included in the third box set.

The Japanese-only, nine-volume "Renewal of Evangelion" DVDs were released on June 25, 2003, with improved acoustic effects, remixed dialogue and a remastered soundtrack for 5.1 stereo sound. The first eight volumes covered the original twenty-six episodes, including two versions of episodes from the twenty-first to the twenty-fourth: the extended video version that was available in previous releases, and a reconstruction of the shorter broadcast version, which was made available for the first time since the Genesis 0:X LaserDisc. The ninth volume contained Death (True)², while the tenth included End of Evangelion (omitting Rebirth). The Renewal Project release formed the basis for the Western "Platinum Edition". On December 1, 2014, Studio Khara announced a Blu-ray boxset containing a new HD-remastering of the television series, the video versions of the episodes from the twenty-first to the twenty-fourth, as well as the two movies, both as Revival of Evangelion, the director's cut, which was available in the Renewal DVDs, and as their original theatrical versions Death and Rebirth and The End of Evangelion. Another DVD set, titled Archives of Evangelion, was announced. It contains the original unaltered broadcast version of the television series as well as the broadcast version of Death (True) & Rebirth that aired on January 2, 1998. Both sets were released on August 26, 2015, to commemorate the twentieth anniversary of the TV series. Following the bankruptcy and closure of Gainax between May and June 2024, Anno's current animation company, Studio Khara, officially gained the full copyright of the Evangelion franchise.

=== International ===
==== ADV Films ====
The series was distributed in North America and Europe by ADV Films. The thirteen English VHS tapes, released from August 20, 1996, to July 7, 1998, contained two episodes each and were released using the same "Genesis 0:(volume number)" naming convention as the first Japanese home video release. Two LaserDisc collections were released as Collection 1 Deluxe Edition and Collection 2 Deluxe Edition, containing episodes one to four and five to eight, respectively. The first DVD release by ADV Films was the eight-disk Perfect Collection in 2002, containing the original installments. In 2004, ADV released two DVD compilations titled Neon Genesis Evangelion: Resurrection and Neon Genesis Evangelion: Genesis Reborn, encompassing the directors' cuts of episodes from the twenty-first to the twenty-fourth, and additionally including the original versions of episodes from the twenty-first to the twenty-sixth.

The Platinum Edition release was announced by ADV in 2004, consisting of seven DVDs released between July 27, 2004, and April 19, 2005. The Platinum Edition contained the original twenty-six episodes and the four "Director's cut" versions of episodes from the twenty-first to the twenty-fourth. A six-disc version of the Platinum Edition, the Platinum Complete Edition, was released on November 22, 2005, and omitted several extras included in other versions, including commentary and trailers. A seven-disc Platinum Perfect Collection tin case version was released on November 27, 2007, and included the extras that were omitted from the Platinum Complete Edition. On November 18, 2008, a seven-disc Holiday Edition DVD was released; this would be the final DVD release of the series from ADV Films. In late November 2011, it was announced the series was going out of print.

==== Madman Anime ====
Madman has held the rights to the series since 1998 in New Zealand and Australia, where Evangelion was broadcast in 1999 by the Special Broadcasting Service. Madman Anime also holds the home video licenses for the Rebuild of Evangelion films.

==== Netflix ====
On November 26, 2018, streaming company Netflix announced that it had acquired the worldwide streaming rights to the original anime series, as well as Evangelion: Death (True)² and The End of Evangelion, for release in Q2 2019. On March 22, 2019, Netflix announced a June 21, 2019, premiere date for the titles. Following the dissolution of ADV Films in late 2009, the Netflix release includes a re-translated script from Studio Khara's in-house translator Dan Kanemitsu and a new English-language cast chosen by Khara. The new dub received praise for the actors' performances, but the new script received some criticism for straightwashing the relationship between the characters Shinji and Kaworu. The Netflix release omits "Fly Me to the Moon" in regions outside of Japan due to licensing issues.

==== Anime Limited and GKIDS ====
On May 30, 2020, British anime distributor Anime Limited announced it had acquired home video distribution rights for the original series, Evangelion: Death (True)² and The End of Evangelion in the United Kingdom and Ireland, with an Ultimate Edition Blu-ray release scheduled for 2021, marking the international release of the original series on Blu-ray. On October 3, 2020, North American anime distributor GKIDS announced it had licensed the original TV series, Death (True)² and The End of Evangelion for home video, theatrical, and digital download release with an Ultimate Edition to be released in 2021, making this the first Blu-ray release of the franchise in North America. On August 30, 2021, GKIDS announced a Collector's Edition and a Standard edition release in addition to the Ultimate Edition. The Collector's/Ultimate edition had the "Classic Dub and Subtitled Version", including the ADV and Manga English dubs and subs, while the standard edition only included the Netflix English dub and sub. "Fly Me to the Moon" was not included in any of the GKIDS/All the Anime releases due to licensing issues. The Standard edition was released on November 9, 2021, while the Collector's/Ultimate edition was released on December 8, 2021. On November 2, 2021, GKIDS released the TV series, Death (True)² and The End of Evangelion on all major digital download services six days ahead of the Standard Blu-ray release. This release, like the Standard BD, only contains the Netflix dub and sub.

==== The Criterion Channel ====
The Criterion Collection announced on July 30, 2026, that the series, alongside the films Death (True)² and The End of Evangelion, would appear on their streaming service, The Criterion Channel, starting September 1 of that year. This release includes both the Japanese version, as well as the English dub recorded by ADV Films.

== Reception ==
Neon Genesis Evangelion received widespread acclaim both domestically and internationally during its initial broadcast and in the decades since. On review aggregator Rotten Tomatoes, the series has an approval rating of 100% based on 32 reviews, with an average rating of 8.3/10. The website's critical consensus reads, "Neon Genesis Evangelion, both a cultural touchstone for Japan and an uncompromising auteurist vision by creator Hideaki Anno, doubles as an enthralling apex for the mecha anime genre and as a harrowing exploration of depression – making for a wholly singular epic about angels and inner demons." Paste and IGN named it as one of the best anime series of all time. The "richness" of the characters and "complex and layered" narrative has received praise by critics. In 1998, Max Autohead of Hyper rated it 10 out of 10, praising the "brilliant and fantastic storyline, with amazing characters who pull you not only into their world, but into their psyche as well". The same year, Shidoshi of GameFan gave it an A rating, calling it an "awesome" series. Mike Hale of The New York Times described it in 2009 as "a superior anime, a giant-robot tale of unusual depth, feeling and detail."

Following the conclusion of the series's original television broadcast, the public and critical reception to Neon Genesis Evangelion was polarized, particularly with regard to the final two episodes. The experimental style of the finale confused or alienated many fans and spawned debate and controversy; the criticism was largely directed toward the lack of storyline resolution in the final two episodes. As such, opinion on the finale was deeply mixed, with the audience broadly divided between those who considered the episodes successfully introspective and those who felt their meaning was "more apparent than real". The English voice actors admitted that they also had trouble understanding the series's conclusion. The Mainichi Times wrote that after the broadcast of the penultimate episode, "nearly all viewers felt betrayed ... When commentator Eiji Ōtsuka sent a letter to the Yomiuri Shimbun, complaining about the end of the Evangelion series, the debate went nationwide." Despite the criticism, Anno stood by his artistic choices for the series's conclusion. Critic Zac Bertschy remarked in 2003 that "Most of the backlash against Evangelion existed because people don't like to think". The initial controversy surrounding the end of Evangelion has had no lasting negative influence on the popularity of the series.

Evangelion has developed into a social phenomenon beyond its primary fan base, generating national discussion in Japan. The series has also been the subject of numerous media reports, debates, and research studies worldwide. The show has received reviews by critics, academics and sociologists alike, including by Susan J. Napier, William Rout, Mick Broderick, Mari Kotani, Shinji Miyadai, Hiroki Azuma, Yuriko Furuhata, and Marc Steinberg. The series has been described as both a critique and deconstruction of the mecha genre. Japanese critic Manabu Tsuribe considered that Evangelion was "extremely interior and is lacking in sociality, so that it seems to reflect pathology of the times." Anime News Network's Theron Martin described the character design as "distinctive, designed to be sexy rather than cutesy", and the mecha designs as "among the most distinctive ever produced for an anime series, with sleek, lithe appearances that look monstrous, fearsome, and nimble rather than boxy and knight-like". Mike Crandol stated, "It no longer seems contrite to say that Evangelion is surely one of the all-time great works of animation". In February 2004, Cinefantastique listed the anime as one of the "10 Essential Animations".

=== Awards ===
Neon Genesis Evangelion has scored highly in popularity polls. In 1996, the series won first place in the "Best Loved Series" category of the Anime Grand Prix, a reader-polled award series published in Animage magazine. The show was again awarded this prize in 1997 by a large margin. The End of Evangelion won first place in 1998, making Neon Genesis Evangelion the first anime franchise to win three consecutive first place awards. The website IGN ranked Evangelion as the tenth best animated series in its "Top 100 Animated TV Series" list. The series also placed third in Animage's "anime that should be remembered in the 21st Century" list. In 1998, EX.org's readers voted Neon Genesis Evangelion the best US anime release and in 1999, the second-best show of all time. In 2007, a large-scale survey poll by TV Asahi voted Evangelion as the second most appreciated anime in Japan. The series was also ranked as the most popular of all time in a 2006 survey of 80,000 attendees at the Japan Media Arts Festival.

Evangelion won the Animation Kobe award in 1996, and 1997. The series was also awarded the eighteenth Nihon SF Taisho Award and the Excellence Award at the first Japan Media Arts Festival in 1997, while The End of Evangelion ranked sixth on Wizard's Anime Magazine's list of the "Top 50 Anime released in North America". In the August 1996 issue of Animage, Evangelion characters placed high in the rankings of best characters with Rei Ayanami ranked first, Asuka Langley Soryu third, Kaworu Nagisa, fourth and Shinji Ikari sixth. Rei won in the Female Character category in 1995 and 1996 and Shinji Ikari won the Male Character category in 1996 and 1997. In 2010, Newtype magazine recognized Rei as the most popular character of the 1990s in the female category, and Shinji in the male category. "A Cruel Angel's Thesis" won the Animage award in the Best Song category in 1996, and TV Asahi recognized it as the eighteenth best anime song since 1990. TV Asahi also recognized the "suicide of Ayanami Rei" in the twenty-third episode, "Rei III", as the ninth most touching anime scene ever.

== Influence and legacy ==
Evangelion has had a profound and lasting impact on the anime industry and Japanese popular culture. The series, airing at a time when the anime industry and its televised series were in a slump period, is credited with revitalizing the industry and raising the standard for high-quality Japanese animation. CNET reviewer Tim Hornyak credits the series with revitalizing and transforming the giant mecha genre. In the 1980s and 1990s, Japanese animation saw decreased production following the economic crash in Japan. This was followed by a crisis of ideas in the years to come. Against this backdrop, Evangelion imposed new standards for the animated series, ushering in the era of the "new Japanese animation serial", characterized by innovations that allowed a technical and artistic revival of the industry. The production of anime serials began to reflect greater artistic control, the concentration of resources in fewer but higher quality episodes, typically ranging from thirteen to twenty-six, a directorial approach similar to live film, and greater freedom from the constraints of merchandising. According to TV Tokyo's Keisuke Iwata, the global spread of Japanese animation expanded dramatically due to the popularity of Evangelion. In Japan, Evangelion prompted a review of the cultural value of anime, and its success, according to Roland Kelts, made the medium more accessible to the international youth scene. With the interest in the series, otaku culture became a mass social phenomenon. The show's regular reruns increased the number of otaku, while John Lynden links its popularity to a boom in interest in literature on the Dead Sea Scrolls, Kabbalah and Christianity.

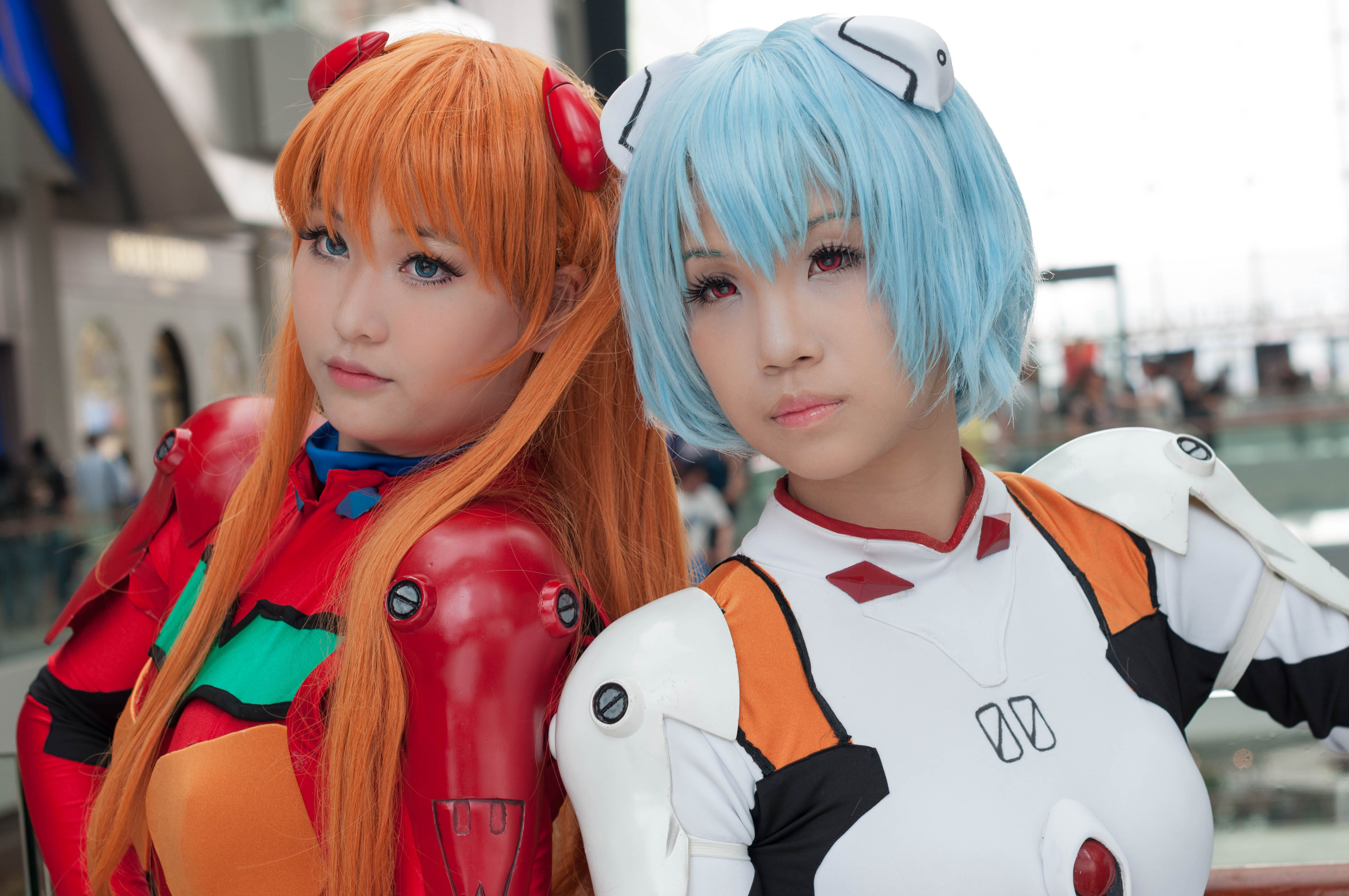
Two cosplayers portraying Asuka Langley Soryu and Rei Ayanami. The franchise has been credited as a conduit for making cosplay a worldwide phenomenon.

Critics have noted Evangelion's influence on subsequent anime series, such as Serial Experiments Lain, RahXephon, Texhnolyze, Gasaraki, Guilty Crown, Boogiepop Phantom, Blue Submarine No. 6, Martian Successor Nadesico, Rinne no Lagrange, Gurren Lagann, Dual! Parallel Trouble Adventure, Argento Soma, Pilot Candidate, Generator Gawl, and Dai-Guard. References, homages and tributes to the series are also featured in Japanese and Western media such as Magical Shopping Arcade Abenobashi, Koi Koi Seven, Hayate the Combat Butler, Baka and Test, Regular Show, My Little Pony: Friendship is Magic, Gravity Falls, Sgt. Frog, Rick and Morty, One Hour Photo, Steven Universe, Kong: Skull Island, and Nope. The show's mixture of religion and mecha also influenced Japanese video games, including Xenogears and El Shaddai: Ascension of the Metatron.

The design and personality traits of the character Rei Ayanami were emulated for many anime and manga characters of the late 1990s, such as Ruri Hoshino (Nadesico), Ruriko Tsukushima (Droplet), Miharu (Gasaraki), Anthy Himemiya (Revolutionary Girl Utena), and Lain Iwakura (Serial Experiments Lain). The character of Asuka was parodied by Excel (Excel Saga), and some of her traits were used to create the character of Mai in Gunparade March. According to Italian critic Guido Tavassi, Evangelion's mecha design, characterized by a greater resemblance to the human figure, and the abstract designs of the Angels, also had a significant impact on the designs of future anime productions. Nobuhiro Watsuki designed several characters in Rurouni Kenshin based on characters from Neon Genesis Evangelion, namely Uonuma Usui, Honjō Kamatari and Fuji. Other artists have cited the series as an inspiration, including film director Makoto Shinkai, W.I.T.C.H. series director Marc Gordon and manga artist Gege Akutami on the Jujutsu Kaisen manga series. In the aftermath of Evangelion, Anno reused stylistic conceits from the series in the live-action film Love & Pop and the anime romance series Kare Kano. Neon Genesis Evangelion also influenced music artists, such as the British band Fightstar and its debut album, Grand Unification, and the Japanese band Rey, which derived its name from Rei Ayanami.

== Merchandising ==
In Japan, Evangelion is an enormous content and merchandise industry with hundreds of millions of dollars in revenue. Images of its biomechanical Eva robots are on everything from coffee mugs to smartphones and even airplane wraps.

— Tim Hornyak, CNET (July 16, 2013)

The popularity of Neon Genesis Evangelion extends to its merchandising, which exceeded $400 million within two years of its release. The series has generated a wide range of merchandise products for consumers of various age groups, such as cell phones, laptops, soundtracks, DVDs, action figures, telephone cards and an official set of Japanese coins. However, its stylized mecha designs were initially criticized by certain toy companies as being too difficult to manufacture, with some expressing concern that models of the Evangelions "would never sell." Eventually, Sega agreed to license all toy and video game sales. At the time of the release of the films Death & Rebirth and The End of Evangelion, estimated sales of Evangelion merchandise topped $300 million, of which 70% derived from sales of video and laser discs, soundtrack and single CDs, computer software and the three-volume manga.

The commercial exploitation of the series for the home video market achieved record sales and remained strong over a decade later. The fame of the show has grown through home video sales, which exceeded two or three times the sales of other contemporary anime series and films. According to anime critic Guido Tavassi, the series contributed significantly to the spread of the DVD format in Japan and had a considerable impact on the Japanese economy, calculated in billions of yen. In 2006, Matt Greenfield stated that the franchise had earned over $2 billion. A 2007 estimate placed total sales of 6,000 related goods at over ¥150 billion. By 2015, more than two million Evangelion pachinko and pachislot machines had been sold, generating ¥700 billion in revenue.

== See also ==
- Future history
- Near future in fiction
