= Screenplay of Royal Space Force: The Wings of Honnêamise =

Screenplay of the 1987 anime film

Gainax's proposal to make their debut anime work Royal Space Force was given interim approval in April of 1985 by lead financial backer Bandai after a presentation by planner Toshio Okada and director Hiroyuki Yamaga of a four-minute "pilot film" version at Bandai's Tokyo corporate headquarters, following which Yamaga returned to his hometown of Niigata to begin to write the screenplay, taking inspiration from both the city's urban geography and by observing its passing street traffic. A further real-world influence on the screenplay was a trip taken in August of that year by Yamaga and other film crew members to New York City, Washington, D.C., and the Space Coast of Florida to research postmodern architecture and aerospace history as well as witness a launch of the Space Shuttle Discovery.

Noriaki Ikeda, winner of the Seiun Award for nonfiction, argued that Royal Space Force brought to anime the sensibilities that the works of the American New Wave had brought to the live-action movies of Hollywood in the 1960s; remarking on the screenplay's particular attention to dialogue and its nuance, suggesting that unlike other contemporary anime the film did not "scream its message". Yamaga asserted that in the service of realistic worldbuilding, he had deliberately attempted to create dialogue that was "meaningless" in terms of plot but that instead suggested a dimension of depth existing independently of the narrative.

Yamaga and Okada had agreed that the script acknowledged the full range of human nature; the director stated moreover that the film's characters have only occasional "glimpses of understandings" towards each other, based on Yamaga's own belief that in real life it is impossible to truly understand others, but that relationships are possible even without such an understanding. Yamaga remarked that his intent to depict a meaningful but non-romantic relationship between the film's male and female leads created a challenge for audiences to comprehend and that the film's highly controversial (Note: In 2023, Daryl Surat remarked of Royal Space Force in Otaku USA magazine that "it has been regarded as the single greatest anime film of all time, such that its omission from lists of 'best anime ever made' warrants scorn and scrutiny. It has also been summarily dismissed as unworthy of acknowledgment or discussion due to its depiction of a very realistic attempted sexual assault by the protagonist, such that its inclusion on lists of 'best anime ever made' warrants scorn and scrutiny; truly a 'problematic fave.'") depiction of an attempted rape and its aftermath had been "very difficult" to explain even to the production crew. Following his departure from Gainax, Okada expressed criticism of the screenplay, feeling that at times it made the protagonist's actions confusing for most audiences; while Okada had originally supported the concept of Royal Space Force as an art film whose goal of realism meant that it could not have a strongly constructed "Hollywood" script, upon looking back Okada considered that the film's expensive production classified it as a "major motion picture" and that with some changes to the script "it could have met the mainstream."

== Screenplay ==
"The film was Gainax's call to the world, of how we would be. The story of the anime is explaining why we are making anime in the first place. The lift-off of the rocket was only a preview of our future, when we were saying to ourselves, 'Oh, we will do something!' But those feelings are mostly gone, just like memories, just like the person you were when you were young. It has almost gone away. But there is still the real thing, the film we made, that tells our story."—Toshio Okada, 1995

=== Location influences on script ===
Following the presentation of the pilot film, Yamaga returned to his hometown of Niigata to begin to write the screenplay and draw up storyboards, using a coffeehouse in which to work, taking glances out the window. (Note: In a November 2004 interview (published in 2005), Shinji Higuchi recalled that Yamaga began explaining his film theory to his assistant directors through the metaphor of a mirrored wall in a coffeehouse, which, like a movie, had the purpose of making the space one was present in appear bigger; Yamaga would also use the image of "the world through a coffeehouse mirror" to describe Royal Space Force in a 1997 interview with Animerica.) The opening scene of Royal Space Force, narrated by an older Shirotsugh considering his past, depicts a younger Shiro witnessing the takeoff of a jet from an aircraft carrier; the look of the scene is directly inspired by the winter damp and gloom of Niigata's coastline along the Sea of Japan. Yamaga envisioned the fictional Honnêamise kingdom where most of the events of Royal Space Force took place to have the scientific level of the 1950s combined with the atmosphere of America and Europe in the 1930s, but with characters who moved to a modern rhythm. The inspiration he sought to express in anime from Niigata was not the literal look of the city, but rather a sense of the size and feel of the city and its environs, including its urban geography; the relationships between its old and new parts, and between its denser core and more open spaces.

In August 1985, six members of the Royal Space Force crew, Yamaga, Okada, Inoue, Sadamoto, and Anno from Gainax, accompanied by Shigeru Watanabe from Bandai, traveled to the United States for a research trip, studying postmodern architecture in New York City, aerospace history at the National Air and Space Museum in Washington, D.C., and witnessing a launch of the Space Shuttle Discovery at Kennedy Space Center in Florida. Documentary footage of the research trip was shot by Watanabe and incorporated into a promotional film released two weeks before the Japanese premiere of Royal Space Force. Yamaga made revisions to the script during the American research tour. While staying in the US, the group was surprised and amused to see an English-dubbed version of Macross showing on their hotel room TV, a series which Yamaga, Anno, and Sadamoto had all worked upon; the scenes were from a rerun of Robotech, which had completed its initial run on American television earlier that summer.

=== Approach to dialogue and character relationships ===
Noriaki Ikeda, winner of the 1986 Seiun Award for nonfiction, began a series of articles on the film's production that year for Animage. After watching a rough edit of the film, Ikeda wrote that Royal Space Force was an anime that reminded him of what the works of the American New Wave had brought to the live-action movies of Hollywood in the 1960s; perceiving in the film an effort by Gainax to create a work with their own sense of words and rhythm, employing natural body language, raw expressions, and timing, and an overall "texture" that made a closer approach to human realities. Reviewing the completed film five months later, Ikeda made extensive comment on the scriptwriting: "It's been some time since I've seen an original work that pays so much attention to dialogue, and features such subtle nuance," contrasting it to "the anime we're used to seeing these days, that scream their message at you." Ikeda remarked in particular on how supporting characters were given dialogue to speak that was independent of the main storyline, which gave a sense that they were real human beings, and how this was further expressed in scenes that managed to convey "dialogue without dialogue," such as the sequence in the rocket factory where characters are seen to converse although only music is heard on the audio track. Yamaga suggested the idea of a film as the creation of an auteur was in conflict with the goal of depicting of a truly realistic world. He asserted that particularly since in animation, unlike in live-action, whatever appears in a scene is considered to have been "intentional," his objective with Royal Space Force was to deliberately seek to erase directorial authorship of this kind from the film as much as possible through dialogue and scenes that were "meaningless" in a strict narrative sense, but were intended instead to add a dimension of depth existing behind the story.

In a roundtable discussion with the anime magazine OUT following the film's theatrical release, Yamaga remarked, "I wanted to taste the sense of liberation I could get if I recognized everything [about human nature] and included it," a view with which Okada had concurred, saying, "this is a film that acknowledges people in their every aspect". On the 2000 DVD commentary, Yamaga stated of the character relationships in Royal Space Force that "A critic once said that none of the characters in this film understand each other. That there's no communication between the characters. He was exactly right. The characters don't understand each other at all. But throughout the film, there are moments where there are glimpses of understanding between [Shirotsugh] and the other characters ... In reality, it's okay not to understand each other. People all live their individual lives—it's not necessary to feel the same way another feels. And in fact you will never understand anybody anyway. This is how I feel about the relationships I have with the people in my life." (Note: In the 2000 director's commentary, Yamaga and Akai made extensive discussion on the portrayal of Riquinni; Yamaga remarked on the viewer misconception that she made her money as a prostitute, whereas Akai commented that he didn't think the film's staff themselves fully understood Riquinni: "I think it was our lack of ability that we couldn't make [her] a more prominent character.")

=== Okada and Yamaga's retrospective ===
Three years after his 1992 departure from Gainax, Okada reflected on the film's screenplay in an interview with Animerica: "Our goal at first was to make a very 'realistic' film. So we couldn't have the kind of strong, dramatic construction you'd find in a Hollywood movie. [Royal Space Force] is an art film. And at the time, I thought that was very good, that this is something—an anime art film. But now when I look back, I realize ... this was a major motion picture. Bandai spent a lot of money on it. It was our big chance. Maybe if I'd given it a little stronger structure, and a little simpler story—change it a little, make it not so different—it could have met the mainstream." "I think the audience gets confused at three points in the film: the first scene, which is Shiro's opening monologue, the rape scene, and the prayer from space. Why? The film needed a stronger structure. A little more. A few changes, and the audience would be able to follow Shiro's thoughts. But right now, they miss it, and that's a weakness. It's true that there will be ten or twenty percent of the audience who can follow it as is, and say, 'Oh, it's a great film! I can understand everything! ' But eighty percent of the audience is thinking, 'I lost Shiro's thoughts two or three times, or maybe four or five.' Those are the kind of people who will say, 'The art is great, and the animation is very good, but the story—mmmm...'" Okada remarked however that the decentralized decision-making creative process at Gainax meant there were limits to how much control could be asserted through the script; Akai would later comment that "the staff were young and curious, not unlike the characters in the film. If you tried to control them too much, they would have just walked out."

Yamaga asserted that a "discrepancy between who [Riquinni] wanted to be and who she really was...is evident in her lifestyle and dialogue," and that "on the outside," she carries an image of Shiro as "'an extraordinary being who travels through space into this peaceful and heavenly place'... But deep down inside she knows the truth. She's not stupid." The director remarked that Riquinni's actions and dialogue in the film's controversial scenes of assault and the morning after reflect the dissonances present in both her self-image and her image of Shiro, and that the scene "was very difficult to explain to the staff" as well; that she is signaling her strength to go on living according to her beliefs, and without Shiro in her life any longer. "There's no simple explanation for that scene, but basically, I was depicting a human situation where two people are moving closer and closer, yet their relationship isn't progressing at all...[Shiro resorts] to violence in an attempt to close that gap, only to find that was also useless. The two of them never came to terms, never understood each other, even to the end of the movie. However, even though they never understood each other, they are in some way linked together..." Yamaga affirmed that the scene where Riquinni looks up from her farm labor at the jet overhead was meant to be a match with the young Shiro doing the same in the opening monologue, yet at the same time showing that she and Shiro lived their lives in different worlds. "Whereas [in the final scene] with the snow, it's actually touching her, so there is a small intimacy in that image. But the snow is very light—it melts the moment it falls. So then, are they touching, or aren't they touching? I wanted to depict an ambiguous relationship between them at the very end." "When there's a man and a woman in a film, you automatically think that there's going to be a romance between them, but I didn't mean for it to be that way. Looking back now, I realize that it's difficult to comprehend a story about a man and a woman without romance, but at the time I made this film, I felt that a relationship between a man and a woman did not have to be a romantic one."
