= Daicon III and IV Opening Animations =

1981 and 1983 anime short films

- Daicon III & IV Opening Animation
- Promotional artwork for Daicon IV
- Anime film
- Directed by: Hiroyuki Yamaga
- Music by: Koichi Sugiyama; Yuji Ohno; Bill Conti; Kitarō; Electric Light Orchestra
- Studio: Daicon Film
- Released: 1981 (III); 1983 (IV)
- Runtime: Approximately 5½ mins (III); Approximately 6 mins (IV)

The Daicon III and IV Opening Animations are two 8 mm film anime short films that were produced for the 1981 Daicon III and 1983 Daicon IV Nihon SF Taikai conventions. They were produced by a group of amateur animators known as Daicon Film, who would later go on to form the animation studio Gainax. The films are known for their unusually high production values for amateur works and for including numerous references to otaku culture, as well as its unauthorized appropriations of the Playboy Bunny costume. Usage of the songs "Runaway" by Bill Conti (from the soundtrack to the 1981 James Bond film For Your Eyes Only) as well as "Twilight" and "Hold On Tight" by English rock band Electric Light Orchestra were also unauthorized.

Daicon III was made by Hideaki Anno, Hiroyuki Yamaga and Takami Akai and Daicon IV credits twelve people, including Yamaga as the director and Anno and Akai as animation supervisors. Despite the questionable legal status of the works, the production of Daicon III resulted in debts that were repaid by selling video tapes and 8 mm reels of the production, the profits of which went to the production of Daicon IV, which later received the "Local Works" award in the Minor Anime Grand Prix section of the 1983 Anime Grand Prix, organized by the anime magazine Animage. In 2001, Animage ranked the Daicon animations as the 35th of the "Top 100" anime of all time.

== Summary ==
=== Daicon III Opening Animation ===
The Jet VTOL ship from Ultraman's Science Patrol descends out of the sky toward Earth, as a school girl, carrying her randoseru, observes from behind a tree. The Science Patrol offer the girl a cup of water and ask her to deliver it to "DAICON". The girl salutes and races away, but she quickly experiences trouble as Punk Dragon blocks her path. He summons a mecha from Starship Troopers, and it and the girl begin battling. The girl tosses the mecha aside and Gomora rises from the earth. Using a booster concealed in her backpack, the girl flies up into the sky and evades Gomora's blast, with the mecha flying after her. They continue their battle in mid-air. A blow from the mecha sends the girl falling, imperiling her cup of water. At the last moment, she has a vision of the Science Patrol and regains consciousness. She snatches the cup before it crashes to the ground.

Resuming her battle with the mecha, she catches one of its missiles and hurls it back at it, causing a huge explosion. The destroyed mecha launches a rocket, summoning Godzilla with the Ideon symbol. The song "Runaway" by Bill Conti (from the soundtrack to the 1981 James Bond film For Your Eyes Only) emphasizes the action as King Ghidorah and Gamera chase the girl while she flies through the air with her jet-propelled backpack. A Star Destroyer, a TIE fighter, and Martian fighting machines from the film The War of the Worlds (1953) cross the background. Reaching into her backpack, the girl pulls out a bamboo ruler, which magically becomes a beam saber from Gundam (1979). After slicing an Alien Baltan in half, the girl launches a number of miniature missiles from her backpack. Hit by one of the missiles, a Maser Tank from the Godzilla series catches fire. The Atragon breaks in two as the Yamato, the USS Enterprise, an X-wing fighter and Daimajin explode in complete chaos.

The girl pours her cup of water on a shriveled daikon buried in the ground. As the daikon absorbs the water, it turns into the spaceship Daicon. Bathed in light, and now wearing a naval uniform, the girl boards the ship, where the film's producers, Toshio Okada and Yasuhiro Takeda, sit at the controls. As the landing gear retracts, Daicon departs for the far reaches of the universe.

=== Daicon IV Opening Animation ===
The Daicon IV Opening Animation begins with an abridged, 90-second retelling of the Daicon III Opening Animation set to "Noah's Ark" by Kitarō from the album, Silver Cloud. After this, "Prologue" by Electric Light Orchestra is heard, while the lyrics appear against a starfield and an outline of the spaceship Daicon passes in the background. The film proper begins as "Prologue" segues into "Twilight", the song which follows it on the album Time.

The girl from the previous animation is now an adult, wearing a bunny costume. She fights off a multitude of Ultra Series monsters and aliens (Note: Arstron, Jamila, Alien Zarab, Sartan, Alien Cool, King Joe, Seabozu, Twin Tail, Guesra, Dada, Alien Spell, Alien Poll, Muruchi, Telesdon, Pandon, Hanuman and the severed head of Eleking) and mobile suits then jumps into a throng of Alien Metron and tosses them aside. (Note: She races past Gango, Red King, Alien Baltan, Takkong, Alien Poll, Zetton, Alien Mefilas, and Seagorath, tossing them all aside, and then passing Gudon, Gandar, King Ghidorah, Giradorus and Crazygon before delivering a kick to Eleking) She is then in a lightsaber duel with Darth Vader, with Stormtroopers sitting in the background and the Death Star enshrined in one corner. From atop a cliff, a xenomorph with artificial legs, a reference to Dai Sentai Goggle V's monsters who when grown giant, have the same metallic legs, wielding the Discovery One, knocks the girl down with an energy burst and the Dynaman robot (Dyna Robo) attempts to crush her. The girl lifts Dyna Robo off her with superhuman strength and smashes it against a cliff. The Stormbringer suddenly appears in the sky, and the girl jumps on it, riding it like a surfboard. A few scenes unconnected to the main plot are shown, such as Yoda as Yū Ida given a Japanese comedy routine with various characters in the audience. (Note: C-3PO and Chewbacca from Star Wars, Dr. Nazo from Ōgon Bat, and a Pira Seijin with a nametag reading "Tarō the Blaster" (Bakuhatsu Tarō) on his chest are all in the audience.) The girl is still riding the Stormbringer when she runs into a formation of Ultrahawk 1's. Then the Yamato, the Arcadia attached to the transformed SDF-1 Macross appear, along with an exploding VF-1 Valkyrie variable fighter from Macross armed with a Gundam-style beam saber. An air battle unfolds in an otaku coffee shop. The girl is then seen in a world filled with American comic superheroes. (Note: Shown are Captain America, Robin, Batman, Spider-Man, Superman, and Wonder Woman.) A host of machines and characters (from The Lord of the Rings, Conan, Narnia, Pern, and others) fly past her into space, including a Klingon battle cruiser, the moon ship from H. G. Wells' First Men in the Moon, the Millennium Falcon, Lord Jaxom and the Thunderbirds. (Note: Such as Thunderbird 3, a TIE fighter, and the Millennium Falcon. Kamen Rider, Jumborg Ace, the Shooting Star, nurses, an Ohmu from Nausicaä of the Valley of the Wind, Nausicaä herself, Lynn Minmay, Mazinger Z, Kool Seijin, Cutie Honey, Lord Jaxom and Ruth, and others.) Once back on land, the girl jumps off the Stormbringer and it splits into seven parts, which fly through the sky spewing smoke in seven colors. A sequence of famous spaceships crashing into each other is shown. Then, suddenly, "what could only be described as an atomic bomb" explodes over an unpopulated city, leaving behind a flurry of sakura petals. Successive upheavals of the Earth give birth to new worlds. As a beam launched by the Daicon traverses the sky, lush greenery sprouts and grows. The camera then pans over a massive crowd of fictional characters, (Note: Some of the many characters shown in the crowd scene are Anna, Apollo Geist, Ātman, Alien Vandel, Barom One, Bat, Bert, Big X, Boss Borot, a Brutishdog, Captain Dyce, Char Aznable, Cobra, Cornelius, Cyborg 009, Densen Man, Doruge (a Toei kaijū), Fighters, Doraemon, Space Sheriff Gavan, Gill-man, Go Mifune, Gort, Hack, Hakaider, Hell Ambassador, the Invisible Man, Inspector Zenigata, Kamen Rider V3, Kanegon, Kemur, King Joe, Lum, Lupin III, Maria from Metropolis, Metalinom, Metaluna Mutant, Martian from the 1953 War of the Worlds, Ming the Merciless, Moonlight Mask, Q-tarō, Pris, Robby the Robot, Robocon, the Robot Gunslinger from Westworld, Robot Santōhei, Snake Plisskin, Space Boy Soran, Space Ace, Spock, Superman, Super Sentai, Derek Wildstar, Gigantor, Triton, and a Xilien.) the sun rises, the camera zooms out to the Solar System, and the film ends with an image of the Daicon logo.

Afterwards, a short behind the scenes clip is presented (with another Electric Light Orchestra song playing, "Hold On Tight") showing the character designs, storyboards, early rough animation, backgrounds, effects animation, and the finished cut. The film ends proper with the girl bowing to the audience as "The End" is displayed on the screen.

== Production ==
Originally, the productions were intended to be shot in 16mm film, but both were shot in 8 mm film instead and were completed only the morning before their debut. In order to pay off the debts of the productions, video copies of the animation were sold. Lawrence Eng declares this as the first example of original video animation (OVA) predating Dallos. Kazutaka Miyatake of Studio Nue originally designed the mecha that appears in the Daicon III clip chasing the little girl for a Japanese edition of the military science fiction novel Starship Troopers in the early 1980s.

=== Daicon III ===
In 1981, at the 20th Nihon SF Taikai (nicknamed "Daicon III" because it was held for the third time in Osaka), an 8 mm animation was shown. Nihon SF conventions are usually organized by university students in the vicinity of the host city, and Daicon III was also organized by university students in the vicinity of Osaka, including Toshio Okada and Yasuhiro Takeda. At the request of Okada and Takeda, the animation was actually produced by Hideaki Anno, Hiroyuki Yamaga and Takami Akai, all of whom were students at Osaka University of Arts at the time and would later become professionals. Anno and his team were not so enthusiastic, but Yamaga took the initiative to promote the project. Takeda explains in Notenki Memoirs that Anno had experience in paper animation, but never worked with animation cels. Since they had no professional skills or know-how, they went to professional animation studios to learn the techniques, and in order to reduce costs, they tried to use inexpensive industrial celluloid, which is not normally used. They were referred to Animepolis Pero, an anime hobby store chain, but they found that the cost of the cels were too expensive, so a single cel was purchased and taken to a vinyl manufacturer in east Osaka, where they purchased a roll for 2000 yen. After cutting and preparing the vinyl cels, they discovered that the painted cels would stick together when stacked and dry paint would peel off the cels. To keep costs low, they made their own tap to punch holes in the B5 animation paper used in the production.

The work was carried out in an empty room of Okada's house where their business was also operated. While other people were present, the work was shared and Anno, Akai and Yamaga worked full-time on the production, the direction was not professional, but Takeda attributed Okada as the producer, with Yamaga directing, Akai doing character animation and Anno as the mecha animator. Takeda also said other individuals were involved and were used to trace cels or paint cels as needed, but still credits Yamaga, Akai and Anno with the production itself. Filming was done by a camera on a tripod and frames were called out by Anno because the production lacked timing sheets.

Osamu Tezuka did not see the opening film at Daicon III, but was shown the film by Akai and Yamaga later that night. After watching the film, Tezuka remarked "Well, there certainly were a lot of characters in the film. ... [T]here were also some that weren't in the film". Akai and Yamaga later realized the omission of Tezuka's characters; they were subsequently used in the Daicon IV animation. According to Toshio Okada, the theme of water in the opening represented "opportunity" and Lawrence Eng, an otaku researcher, describes the theme as, "... making the best use of one's opportunities while fighting against those who would seek to steal such opportunity away."

The team behind the animation that gathered for the SF convention was supposed to disband and cease its activities at the end of Daicon III. However, they regretted the loss of the experience, skills, and teamwork they had cultivated in running the event, and started an independent film project to cultivate a well-trained staff with the goal of holding another Nihon SF convention, Daicon IV, in Osaka two years later in 1983. Daicon Film was formed at that time. Okada sold Daicon Film's video and goods at his science fiction goods store "General Products", and sold more than 3000 videos that cost more than 10,000 yen. The profits were used to pay for the production of the next film. Daicon Film went on to produce the 8 mm tokusatsu films Aikoku Sentai Dai Nippon, Kaiketsu Noutenki, and Kaettekita Ultraman. These films, as well as Daicon III Opening Animation, were widely featured in the anime magazine Animec, and Daicon Film gradually gained recognition.

=== Daicon IV ===
In 1983, Nihon SF Taikai was to be held in Osaka again, and it was the fourth SF convention in Osaka overall, Daicon IV. Daicon IV Executive Committee and Daicon Film, the organizing body of Daicon IV, were practically the same organization.

Originally, Daicon IV was supposed to be fifteen minutes long, but the difficult production resulted in the cut time. The film officially credits a production crew of twelve people. Yamaga directed the production, with Anno and Akai as animation directors. Tōru Saegusa did the artwork and the animations were done with Yoshiyuki Sadamoto, Mahiro Maeda, and Norifumi Kiyozumi. Professional animators from the animation production company Artland, including Ichiro Itano, Toshiki Hirano, Narumi Kakinouchi, Sadami Morikawa, and Kazutaka Miyatake, also collaborated. Anno and Yamaga were invited to Tokyo by Studio Nue, a science fiction planning group that had taken notice of the quality of Daicon III's opening animation, and introduced them to Artland, which led them to join the staff of the TV animation Super Dimension Fortress Macross that was being produced by them. Their activities in Tokyo became a stepping stone to their later professional careers. In addition, Akai's hometown friend Maeda, and Sadamoto, Maeda's senior at university, joined Daicon Film, and the core members of Gainax came together here.

The production facility for Daicon IV was in a dedicated studio in a building called the Hosei Kaikan that was owned by a textile union. Takeda defined it as a literal anime sweatshop, the building was shut down at 9:00 pm and a majority of the staff would be locked inside and working through the night without air conditioning. Later, in 1984, Daicon Film made a tokusatsu film called Yamata no Orochi no Gyakushū using 16mm film, which was rare for an independent film at the time. This film was sold by Bandai in 1985. At the end of 1984, with the project of Royal Space Force: The Wings of Honnêamise, Daicon Film was dissolved and established as an animation production company Gainax. The process from Daicon Film to the establishment of Gainax can be seen in detail in the Wings of Honnêamise production progress series that was exclusively serialized in the monthly magazine Model Graphix at the time.

== Reception and release ==
The Daicon III film was reported on in Animec magazine which resulted in requests for the film to be released publicly. In order to pay off the debts from producing the film, the decision was made to sell 8 mm reels of the film and videos. Additional original artwork and the storyboards were included in the release. The sale paid the debts and the profit would be used to produce Daicon IV.

Due to copyright problems, an official release of the animations has proven impossible. For the American release of the film, the rights to use of the Playboy bunny costume were denied, and the rights to the copyrighted music were consequently not sought. However, a LaserDisc featuring both shorts was unofficially released in Japan as bonus material to a ¥16,000 art book of the animations. This is considered rare and highly valuable among collectors, easily fetching prices over $1,000 on online auctions.

== Legacy ==
Since its release the animations have been referenced several times in Japanese media productions, especially those focused on otaku culture. Clips and characters from the animations appear in the 1991 Gainax OVA Otaku no Video. The opening sequence of the Train Man Japanese TV drama series from 2005 was inspired by and uses the Electric Light Orchestra theme and the lead character from the Daicon IV film. In episode 5 of Gainax's FLCL, titled "Brittle Bullet", Haruko, wearing a red bunny suit, flies in on her Rickenbacker 4001 bass guitar and yells "Daicon V!" before attacking a giant robot with a slingshot. Since 2008, Otakon's AMV contest opened with a video inspired by and using clips from the Daicon IV film (with the sole exception of the 2017 iteration).

At Fanimecon, Yamaga said, "[The openings are] a source of pride and something you want to strangle." Akai, who wants to produce better films, stated, "I don't want to see them for a long time. Just thinking about them sends shivers down my spine." Lawrence Eng stated that without the Daicon animations, Gainax might never have existed. In 2001, the anime magazine Animage ranked the Daicon animations as the 35th of the "Top 100" anime of all time. In August 2023, Wonder Festival Summer convention featured a special exhibition to commemorate the 40th anniversary of Daicon IV.

=== Daicon 33 ===
Gainax revealed the details of a new campaign to celebrate Daicon Film's 33rd anniversary. The new project is named "DAICON FILM 33" and was announced on January 8, 2014. The basis of the project is a "revival of DAICON FILM" and includes the release of several goods inspired by the original films from the eighties. The project's official site has started accepting pre-orders for the first lineup of memorial goods. A new illustration of the "Daicon Bunny Girl" has been drawn by Takami Akai, the original character designer of the opening animation films and one of the founders of Gainax. The art was displayed on the top page of Gainax's official site.

=== Daicon III restoration ===
In 2021, Daicon Film regrouped to produce a remaster of Daicon III, featuring involvement from an unspecified member of the short's original staff. The announcement was first published on Twitter by Kineko Video (then known as FemboyFilms), a fan group who had previously received a cease and desist notice for their own restoration attempt of the short from an 8 mm print; the announcement was made with the permission of Daicon Film.
