= Hiroe Suga =

Japanese writer

Hiroe Suga (菅浩江, Suga Hiroe; born April 21, 1963 in Kyoto) is a Japanese science fiction and mystery writer. She was first published in 1981. She has won four Seiun Awards – in 1992 and 2001 for best novel of the year, and in 1993 and 2020 for best short story of the year.

She is also a musician and a qualified dancer in the Wakayagi school of Japanese traditional dance. Music and dance have figured in her fiction. Suga has taught at a story writing course at the Kyoto College of Graphic Studies for Informatics (KCGI).

In November 1990, Suga married Gainax founder Yasuhiro Takeda.

== Awards ==
- 1992: Seiun Award Japanese Long Story for Merusasu no shōnen
- 1993: Seiun Award Japanese Short Story for "Sobakasu no figyua"
- 2001: Seiun Award Japanese Long Story for Eien no mori Hakubutsukan wakusei
- 2001: Mystery Writers of Japan Award Best Novel for Eien no mori Hakubutsukan wakusei
- 2013: Sense of Gender Awards Grand Prize Winner for To Whom Should This Be (Dare ni mi sho tote)
- 2020: Seiun Award Japanese Short Story for "Mizu no Tsuki"
- 2021: Nihon SF Taisho Award for Kanki no uta Hakubutsukan wakusei III

== Works ==
English translation

- "Freckled Figure" (1999), translation of "Sobakasu no figyua" (そばかすのフィギュア) (1992)
- "Five Sisters" (2012), translation of "Go nin shimai" (五人姉妹) (2000)
