= Yoshiyuki Sadamoto =

Japanese artist (born 1962)

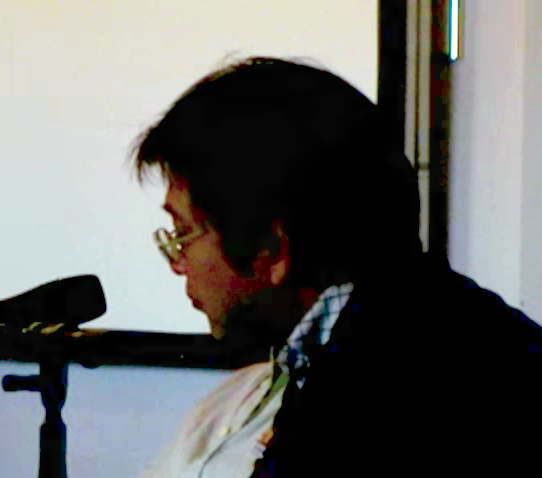
- Yoshiyuki Sadamoto at J-Popcon in Copenhagen, 2007
- Born: January 29, 1962 (age 64); Tokuyama (now Shūnan), Yamaguchi Prefecture, Japan
- Occupations: Character designer, manga artist
- Known for: Neon Genesis Evangelion (manga)

Sample of Sadamoto's art, featuring Rei Ayanami of Neon Genesis Evangelion

Yoshiyuki Sadamoto (貞本 義行, Sadamoto Yoshiyuki; born January 29, 1962, in Tokuyama (now Shunan), Yamaguchi Prefecture, Japan) is a Japanese character designer, manga artist, and one of the founding members of the Gainax anime studio.

== Career ==
When Gainax was originally founded as Daicon Film, Sadamoto served as animator on the second animated project, the Daicon IV opening animation. His first assignment as a character designer for Gainax was the film Royal Space Force: The Wings of Honnêamise, released in 1987, he continued to design characters for Gainax with the series Nadia: The Secret of Blue Water, Neon Genesis Evangelion, FLCL, and Diebuster. The official manga adaptation of Evangelion, published between 1994 and 2013, was fully written and illustrated by Sadamoto. He also collaborated with director Mamoru Hosoda to provide character designs for the films The Girl Who Leapt Through Time, Summer Wars, and Wolf Children.

According to Yasuo Otsuka, who guided Sadamoto as a newcomer, there are only three people whom he regarded as more skillful than himself that he has met during his career. One of them is Yoshiyuki Sadamoto. The other two are Sadao Tsukioka who became a visual creator, and award-winning director Hayao Miyazaki. When Otsuka met the three men, he seems to have felt that he was taking off his hat to them at once. However, he thinks that only Miyazaki completely mastered a genuinely superior animation technique at present. He guesses, "A too excellent person might despair in the group work".

In a 2013 interview with Japanese Entertainment website Nihongogo, it was revealed that Sadamoto is a stickler for details and wouldn't feel comfortable illustrating anything too unfamiliar to him. "In general, I don't want to draw something that I have to study further in order to draw. For example, I could not draw a medical manga because it's impossible for me to make a lie about medicine. Also things like Soccer and Baseball. I am unfamiliar with these worlds so it would be too difficult to show the actual plays." When asked about dream collaborations he revealed an interest in working with Robert Westall and Philip K. Dick but apologized "These are all deceased people, sorry."

=== Accusations of comfort women denial ===
On August 9, 2019, Sadamoto criticized on Twitter a statue featured in the "After 'Freedom of Expression'?" historical art exhibition at the Aichi Prefecture Museum of Art, Statue of Peace (2011), by Kim Seo-kyung and Kim Eun-sang memorializing comfort women, girls who worked in wartime brothels in World War II for the Japanese military. The statue was first installed by its creators in front of the Japanese embassy in Seoul as a form of political protest. He also criticized a movie in the exhibition that showed a picture of the Emperor of Japan being burned and then stomped underfoot, he referred to it as "indistinguishable from a certain country's style of propaganda". Sadamoto said "I wanted it to be an art event with academic contemporary art at its core...Remove the crazy [propaganda]-affirming media and the exhibition could still be redeemed." he follows "I'm not going to completely reject the act of turning propaganda into art, but honestly speaking, it did not speak to me at all on an artistic level." His comments have been criticized by some Koreans and English speakers who replied to his tweet with displeasure of his views.

Later, Sadamoto claimed he merely disliked the statue's design, but liked Korean idols and even had Korean friends.

After 3.0, Sadamoto did not return to work on the final Rebuild movie, Evangelion: 3.0+1.0 Thrice Upon A Time, and has had a diminishing role in the tetralogy. Character design, as well as authorship for the spin-off manga Evangelion 3.0 (-120 min.), was instead handed to Hidenori Matsubara for most of the Rebuilds, with Sadamoto being credited instead as "original character design" in 2.0, 3.0 and 3.0+1.0, with diminishing involvement in a supervisory role for 2.0 and 3.0. He was also not interviewed for the last two films. Many fans, primarily Korean ones, protested at Sadamoto's statements, and asked if he was still involved with the new Eva movie. Sadamoto denied this and stated he had completely resigned from Khara and had "no involvement whatsoever".

== Works ==
Year	Title	Role	Media	Source
1981	FINAL STRETCH	Artist/Story	Manga	
1981	LONELY LONESOME NIGHT	Artist/Story	Manga	
1981	CRAZY RIDER	Artist/Story	Manga	
1983	Daicon IV	Animator	Short film	
1987	Royal Space Force: The Wings of Honnêamise	Character designer	Film	
1988	Gunbuster	Animation director	OVA	
1990–1991	Nadia: The Secret of Blue Water	Character designer	Anime	
1993	ROUTE20	Artist/Story	Manga	
1994–2013	Neon Genesis Evangelion	Artist/Story	Manga	
1995–1996	Neon Genesis Evangelion	Character designer	Anime	
1997	Neon Genesis Evangelion: Death & Rebirth	Design director	Film	
1997	The End of Evangelion	Character designer	Film	
1997	DIRTY WORK	Artist	Manga	
1998	Pilgrim	Artist	Album	
2000	System of Romance	Artist	Manga	
2000	FLCL	Character designer	OVA	
2002	.hack//Sign	Character designer	Anime	
2002–2005	.hack (video game series)	Artist	Video game	
2004–2006	Diebuster	Character designer	OVA	
2006	Gunbuster vs Diebuster: Aim for the Top	Character designer	Film	
2006	The Girl Who Leapt Through Time	Character designer	Film	
2007–2021	Rebuild of Evangelion	Character designer	Film	
2009	Summer Wars	Character designer	Film	
2012	Wolf Children	Character designer	Film	
2013	Short Peace (Gambo)	Character designer	Film	
2014	The Breeze: An Appreciation of JJ Cale	Artist	Album	
2018	Starwing Paradox	Character designer	Video game	
2020	Great Pretender	Character designer	Anime	
2024	Grendizer U	Character designer	Anime	
	Akubi o Suru ni wa Wake ga Aru	Character designer	Anime	
	Aoki Uru	Character designer	Film	

=== Artbooks ===
- Sadamoto Yoshiyuki Art Book ALPHA (Published April 1, 1993) ISBN 4-04-852385-6
- Sadamoto Yoshiyuki Art Book DER MOND [Limited Edition] (Published September 30, 1999) ISBN 4-04-853048-8
- Sadamoto Yoshiyuki Art Book DER MOND [Popular Edition] (Published January 31, 2000) ISBN 4-04-853031-3
- Sadamoto Yoshiyuki Art Book CARMINE [Limited Edition] (Published March 26, 2009) ISBN 978-4-04-854275-3
- Sadamoto Yoshiyuki Art Book CARMINE [Regular Edition] (Published August 26, 2010) ISBN 978-4-04-854480-1
- Yoshiyuki Sadamoto CD-ROM art collection (GAINAX sale in 1993)
