= Yamata no Orochi no Gyakushū =

- Directed by: Takami Akai
- Written by: Takami Akai; Aiko Ito
- Produced by: Takeshi Sawamura
- Starring: Kakumi Takahashi; Tatsuto Nagayama; Kenichiro Mera
- Release date: December 1985
- Running time: 72 minutes
- Country: Japan
- Language: Japanese

Yamata no Orochi no Gyakushū (Japanese: 八岐之大蛇の逆襲; Eight-Headed Giant Serpent's Counterattack) is a tokusatsu kaiju fan film shot on 16mm by Daicon Films (later Gainax). It was released in December 1985 and runs at 72 minutes. This was the most heavily promoted of Daicon's fan films. It was so successful that it was released on video by Bandai/Emotion. This film was also a turning point for the career of special effects director Shinji Higuchi.

This film was Daicon's epic parody of the many classic daikaiju (giant monster) films, and featured a more biomechanical-looking version of the mythical eight-headed serpent, the Orochi. This one was created by aliens, which had invaded Earth in ancient times. 2000 years later, they dispatch the Orochi again to destroy Japan and the rest of the world. Only a team of the Japan Self-Defense Forces and a scientist (two other staples in the daikaiju genre), can destroy it.

== Cast ==
- Akiko Kirihara - Kakumi Takahashi
- Shunsaku Tako - Tatsuto Nagayama
- Tank Corps General Yoshikawa - Kenichiro Mera
- Captain Mouri - Yasuhiro Takeda

== Staff ==
- Producer: Takeshi Sawamura
- Director: Takami Akai
- Director of Special Effects: Shinji Higuchi
- Writers: Takami Akai, Aiko Ito
- Miniatures design: Hideaki Anno
