= Money Wars =

Japanese original video animation

マネーウォーズ 狙われたウォーターフロント計画 (Manē Wōzu Nerawareta Wōtā Furonto Keikaku)
- Original video animation
- Directed by: Yusaku Saotome
- Written by: Shuichi Miyashita
- Studio: Gainax
- Released: September 21, 1991
- Runtime: 45 minutes

Money Wars (マネーウォーズ 狙われたウォーターフロント計画, Manē Wōzu Nerawareta Wōtā Furonto Keikaku) is a Japanese manga series by Soichiro Miyagawa, serialized in Business Jump. It was adapted into an OVA by Gainax. It is a story about a battlefield in the stock market.
