= Otaku no Video =

1991 original video animation

- DVD cover of North American release of Otaku no Video

おたくのビデオ (Otaku no Bideo)
- Created by: Gainax
- Original video animation
- Directed by: Takeshi Mori; Shōichi Masuo (unit director)
- Written by: Toshio Okada
- Music by: Kohei Tanaka
- Studio: Gainax
- Licensed by: AnimEigo
- Released: September 27, 1991 – December 20, 1991
- Episodes: 2

Otaku no Video (おたくのビデオ, Otaku no Bideo; lit. "Otakus' Video") is a 1991 Japanese original video animation (OVA) produced by Gainax. The anime spoofs the life and culture of otaku, individuals with obsessive interests in media, particularly anime and manga, as well as the history of Gainax and its creators. It is noted for its mix of conventional documentary film styles with a more traditional anime storytelling fashion. It is licensed in the United States by AnimEigo. The DAICON III and IV Opening Animations from the early 1980s are also featured in this OVA.

== Plot ==
The story begins in Otaku no Video 1982, where the main character is an everyman character, Ken Kubo, living with his girlfriend Yoshiko and as a member of his college's tennis team, until introduced by his former friend Tanaka to a club of enthusiasts: a female illustrator, an information geek, a martial artist, and a weapons collector. Kubo soon joins them; and when Yoshiko, who hates otaku, abandons him, makes the wish to become the supreme enthusiast, under the name of Otaking.

Kubo's quest continues in More Otaku no Video 1985, set three years later, in which he creates his model kits, opens shops, and builds a factory in China. Later, he loses his fortune when one of his rivals (now married to Yoshiko) takes control of his enterprise; but Kubo and Tanaka, with hard-working artist Misuzu, gradually take over the anime industry with a 'magical girl' show, "Misty May". At the peak of their ambitions, Ken and Tanaka create Otakuland in 1999: the equivalent of Disneyland for otaku (the story suggests Otakuland to be located in the same city of Urayasu, Chiba Prefecture, as the original Tokyo Disneyland.)

Many years later, Ken and Tanaka return to Otakuland in a post-apocalyptic submerged Japan and find its central structure, a giant robot, converted into a functional spaceship piloted by their old friends. Miraculously rejuvenated, they fly into space in search of "The Planet of Otaku".

Part of Otaku no Video was the inclusion of live-action documentary excerpts, titled "A Portrait of an Otaku". In these segments, the documentary crew would interview an anonymous otaku, typically ashamed at being a fan and whose face are censored with a mosaic and have their voices digitally masked. The mock documentary segments serve as a counterpoint to the anime: while the anime emphasizes the camaraderie, creativity, and dreams of mainstream acceptance of otaku, the mock interviews exaggerate its negative qualities. The subjects run the gamut of the otaku subculture: the interviews cover a cosplayer who now works as a computer programmer and evasively denies his cosplay days until presented with photographic evidence, but keeps his Char Aznable helmet in his desk drawer, an airsoft otaku, a garage kit otaku, and a shut-in who video-records television programs for trade, but has not actually watched anything that he recorded. The interviews also contain fans who engage in a range of illicit or unsavory activities, such as cel thieves, a pornography fan attempting to manufacture glasses to defeat the mosaic censorship common in Japanese porn videos and who is shown masturbating during the interview, and a computer gamer obsessed with a character in a hentai computer game (Hiroko from Gainax's own hentai game, Cybernetic High School).

== Production ==
Otaku no Video is based on the experiences of Gainax employees which started as a sci-fi and anime fanclub. Staff involved in the OVA include Shinji Higuchi, Takeshi Mori, Kohei Tanaka, Yu Honda, Hidenori Matsubara, and Toshio Okada.

Since Otaku no Video was partially based in the personal life of the original creators of Gainax, who started their careers as otaku during the late seventies and the beginning of the eighties, many anime titles from that period are shown as footage or referenced in the OVA (in costumes, cosplay or other related material). Among them are Gatchaman, Uchuu Senkan Yamato, Urusei Yatsura, Captain Harlock, Mobile Suit Gundam, Dirty Pair, Space Adventure Cobra, Lupin the Third, Phoenix 2772, Silent Möbius, Magical Princess Minky Momo, The Super Dimension Fortress Macross, Macross: Do You Remember Love?, Genesis Climber Mospeada, Royal Space Force: The Wings of Honneamise, Gunbuster, and the Daicon III and IV Opening Animations.

It is believed that all the subjects in the Portrait of an Otaku segments were Gainax employees or connected to Gainax at the time of filming. The first otaku interviewed bore a remarkable resemblance to Toshio Okada, a principal founder in Gainax, in both background and physical appearance. The gaijin otaku, Shon Hernandez, has been confirmed to have been Craig York, who with Shon Howell and Lea Hernandez, whose names were borrowed for the character, were the main staff of General Products USA, an early western branch of Gainax's merchandising enterprise in the early 1990s. The interview with "Shon Hernandez" has been a point of contention with Lea Hernandez, who, in an interview with PULP magazine, noted that the interview was unscripted and that Craig York had been fairly sincere in his thoughts and had felt that Gainax insulted their American members. In the interview, the words spoken by Shon Hernandez in the background are noticeably different from what is shown on screen via subtitle (which is based on the Japanese voice-over "translation").

At FanimeCon 2003, Hiroki Sato, an animator and another Gainax member, mentioned that he had been in one of the interviews in Otaku no Video. In Otaku no Video, the garage kit otaku was given the pseudonym "Sato Hiroshi" for the interview.

== Characters ==
=== Animated version ===
Ken Kubo (久保 健, Kubo Ken)
The main character. Voiced by: Kōji Tsujitani

Tanaka (田中)
Voiced by: Toshiharu Sakurai

Hino (日野)
Voiced by: Shigeru Nakahara

Misuzu Fukuhara (福原 美鈴, Fukuhara Misuzu)
Voiced by: Yūko Kobayashi

Yoshiko Ueno (上野 美子, Ueno Yoshiko)
Voiced by: Kikuko Inoue

Yuri Satō (佐藤 由梨, Satō Yuri)
Voiced by: Yuri Amano

Miyoshi (三善)
Voiced by: Masami Kikuchi

Iiyama (飯山)
Voiced by: Toshiyuki Morikawa

Yamaguchi (山口)
Voiced by: Nobuo Tobita

Kitajima (北島)
Voiced by: Wataru Takagi

Yoshida (吉田)
Voiced by: Hideyuki Umezu

Inoue (井上)
Voiced by: Jun'ichi Kanemaru

Murata (村田)
Voiced by: Kiyoyuki Yanada

Yōko Nakamaru (中丸陽子)
Voiced by: Rena Kurihara

Ryū Kohaku (小白 龍)
Voiced by: Hideyuki Umezu

Bankman Kanda (バンクマン神田, Bankuman Kanda)
Voiced by: Akio Ōtsuka

Narrator (ナレーション, Narēshon)
Voiced by: Akio Ōtsuka

=== Live-action version ("A Portrait of an Otaku") ===
Junichi Tamaya (玉谷 純一, Tamaya Junichi)
Portrayed by: Jun Tamaya

Yūta Ikuta (生田 雄大, Ikuta Yūta)
Portrayed by: Himself

Harold Shiota (ハロルド 潮田, Harorudo Shiota)
Portrayed by: Kazuya Shioiri

Kenji Mamiya (間宮 健児, Mamiya Kenji)
Portrayed by: Shūichi Miyagawa

A
Portrayed by: Takayuki Masuda

Hiroshi Satō (佐藤 宏, Satō Hiroshi)
Portrayed by: Hiroki Sato

Shon Fernandez (ショーン・フェルナンデス, Shōn Ferunandesu)
Portrayed by: Craig York

Osamu Akahori (赤堀 修, Akahori Osamu)
Portrayed by: Osamu Akahagi

Shō Murayama (村山 章, Murayama Shō)
Portrayed by: Shōji Murahama

Hidehiko Kamisaka (上坂 英彦, Kamisaka Hidehiko)
Portrayed by: Hidehiko Kuroda

== Release ==
The OVA consists of two episodes: "1982 Otaku no video" and "1985 More Otaku no Video". The first episode of Otaku no Video had its world premiere at AnimeCon ‘91 on September 1, 1991, where it was shown on 16mm with an audience of 9 people. The OVA was a commercial failure, which has in part been attributed to the bubble economy at the time as well as the content of the anime.

In Japan the OVA was released on Blu-ray Disc in 2014 by TC Entertainment with a new audio commentary track by staff, as well as the creation of a new master.

It was later released with English subtitles on VHS in North America on March 17, 1993, on DVD on April 2, 2002, and on Blu-ray Disc on June 24, 2016, and a future release on October 8, 2024, all by AnimEigo.

== Reception ==
The OVA was largely praised by critics. Carl Gustav Horn of J-pop.com praised the anime saying "ONV's been known to offend fans in America as much as those in Japan. And you know that may be a mark of quality." David Smith at IGN recommended it for fans of the anime Genshiken and said "If you look closely, you can also see some of the secret history of Gainax in there, but you may be laughing too hard to pick up on those subtle details."

== See also ==
- Comic Party
- Cosplay Complex
- DAICON III and IV Opening Animations
