= Gigazine =

Japanese news website

GIGAZINE
- Website type: News website, blog
- Available in: Japanese, English
- Headquarters: Osaka, Japan
- Owner: OSA Inc.
- Founder: Keito Yamazaki
- Website: gigazine.net
- Launched: 1 April 2000; 26 years ago
- Current status: Active

Gigazine (stylised GIGAZINE; Japanese: ギガジン) is a Japanese tech news website published in blog format that launched on April 1, 2000. It covers technology, science, internet culture, anime, food, and product reviews, and also runs translations of articles from foreign websites. The name is a portmanteau of "giga" and "magazine", coined to suggest a gigabyte-class site as an online magazine.

== History ==
The site was founded by Kwansei Gakuin University alumnus and current editor-in-chief Keito Yamazaki (Japanese: 山崎恵人). He incorporated the Gigazine editorial department in 2006. An English-language edition was launched on March 31, 2008.

In 2008, The Guardian and Time recognized GIGAZINE as a very popular blog in Japan and globally influential in general. In 2010, to mark the site's tenth anniversary, Asahi Shimbun Publications published a book by Yamazaki based on the site. In 2021, all Gigazine content was removed from the Internet Archive.

== Warehouse demolition ==
In February 2019, a Gigazine warehouse in Nishiyodogawa-ku, Osaka was partially demolished amid a dispute with the landowner, an incident the site documented extensively and which became known in Japanese media as the "Gigazine warehouse destruction incident" (Japanese: GIGAZINE倉庫破壊事件). In the ensuing civil litigation over the land, the Osaka District Court ruled against Gigazine in March 2021, and the Osaka High Court dismissed its appeal in September 2021, after which the judgment became final. The warehouse was fully demolished under court-ordered execution in November 2021.
