= Gainax =

Japanese animation studio (1984–2025)

Gainax Co., Ltd.
- Logo used from 1995 to 2025
- Native name: 株式会社ガイナックス
- Romanized name: Kabushiki-gaisha Gainakkusu
- Type: Kabushiki-gaisha
- Industry: Animation (anime)
- Predecessor: Daicon Film
- Founded: December 24, 1984; 41 years ago
- Founders: Hideaki Anno; Yoshiyuki Sadamoto; Hiroyuki Yamaga; Takami Akai; Toshio Okada; Yasuhiro Takeda; Shinji Higuchi
- Defunct: December 1, 2025; 11 months ago
- Fate: Bankruptcy
- Successors: Khara (owner of Gainax trademark)
- Headquarters: Musashino, Tokyo, Japan
- Key people: Yasuhiro Kamimura; Yuko Takaishi; Atsushi Moriyama; Yoshiki Usa; Nobuhiko Hayashi
- Number of employees: 18
- Website: gainax.co.jp

Gainax Co., Ltd. (株式会社ガイナックス, Kabushiki-gaisha Gainakkusu; stylized in all caps) was a Japanese animation studio based in Musashino, Tokyo. It is famous for its original anime productions such as Neon Genesis Evangelion, Royal Space Force: The Wings of Honnêamise, Gunbuster, Nadia: The Secret of Blue Water, FLCL, Magical Shopping Arcade Abenobashi, Gurren Lagann, and Panty & Stocking with Garterbelt, which have garnered critical acclaim (Note: The studio's works garnered them Animage's coveted Anime Grand Prix award over ten times since 1990.) and commercial success, as well as for their association with award-winning anime director and studio co-founder Hideaki Anno. Evangelion has reportedly grossed over ¥150 billion (approximately US$1.2 billion). In a discussion at the 2006 Tekkoshocon, Matt Greenfield claimed that Evangelion had grossed over US$2 billion; Takeda reiterated in 2002 that "It sold record numbers of laserdiscs in Japan, and the DVD is still selling well today". The company was headquartered in Koganei, Tokyo.

From its inception, Gainax worked on stories created in-house, such as Nadia and Evangelion, but also adapted existing manga like Kare Kano, Medaka Box and Mahoromatic. The Animage Anime Grand Prix was awarded to Gainax for Nadia: The Secret of Blue Water in 1991, Neon Genesis Evangelion in 1995 and 1996, and The End of Evangelion in 1997. The studio's last production was in 2015.

On May 29, 2024, Gainax filed for bankruptcy with the Tokyo District Court, which was publicly announced on June 7, 2024, the same day it ceased operations; the company was officially dissolved on December 1, 2025.

== History ==
=== Beginnings ===
DVD cover of North American release of Otaku no Video

The studio was formed in the early 1980s as Daicon Film by university students Hideaki Anno, Hiroyuki Yamaga, Takami Akai, Toshio Okada, Yasuhiro Takeda, Yoshiyuki Sadamoto, and Shinji Higuchi. Their first project was an animated short for the 20th Annual Japan National SF Convention, also known as Daicon III, held in 1981 in Osaka, Japan. The short film is about a girl who fights monsters, robots, and spaceships from early science fiction TV shows and films (including Ultraman, Gundam, Space Runaway Ideon, Space Battleship Yamato, Star Trek, Star Wars, and Godzilla) until she finally reaches a desert plain and pours a glass of water on a dried-out daikon radish, which immediately resurrects itself, grows into a huge spaceship, and beams her aboard. Though the short had an ambitious scope, the animation was rough and low-quality.

The group made a much bigger splash with the short they produced for the 22nd Annual Japan National SF Convention, Daicon IV, in 1983. Starting with a better animated recap of their original 1981 short, the short then moves to the girl as a grown woman, wearing a bunny suit and fighting an even wider range of science fiction creatures (including various Mobile Suits from the Gundam series, Darth Vader, a Xenomorph, a Macross Valkyrie, a Pern dragon, Aslan, a Klingon battle cruiser, Spider-Man, and a pan across a vast array of hundreds of other characters) while surfing through the sky on the sword Stormbringer. The action was all set to the Electric Light Orchestra song "Twilight", though the group's failure to properly license the song would prevent the short's official release on DVD (and make the limited laserdisc release of the Daicon shorts very rare and highly sought after items). The Daicon IV short firmly established Daicon Film as a talented new anime studio; albeit small and with only ¥20 million (about US$200,000). The studio changed its name to Gainax in 1985, basing the term "Gainax" on an obscure Tottori Prefecture (Note: Takami Akai is from Tottori and suggested it.) term for "giant", with the English suffix -x added because it sounded "good and was international".

Gainax's first work as a commercial entity was Royal Space Force: The Wings of Honneamise, released in 1987. Although critically acclaimed, Honneamise had a tepid commercial reaction (Gainax attempted to develop a sequel beginning in March 1992, but was unable to do it due to lack of funds). The next release, the 1988 OVA Gunbuster, was a commercial success and put Gainax on a stabler footing to produce works like Nadia and Otaku no Video. During this period, Gainax also produced a number of items such as garage kit and adult video games (a major earner which kept Gainax afloat on occasion, though they were sometimes banned).

=== Evangelion ===
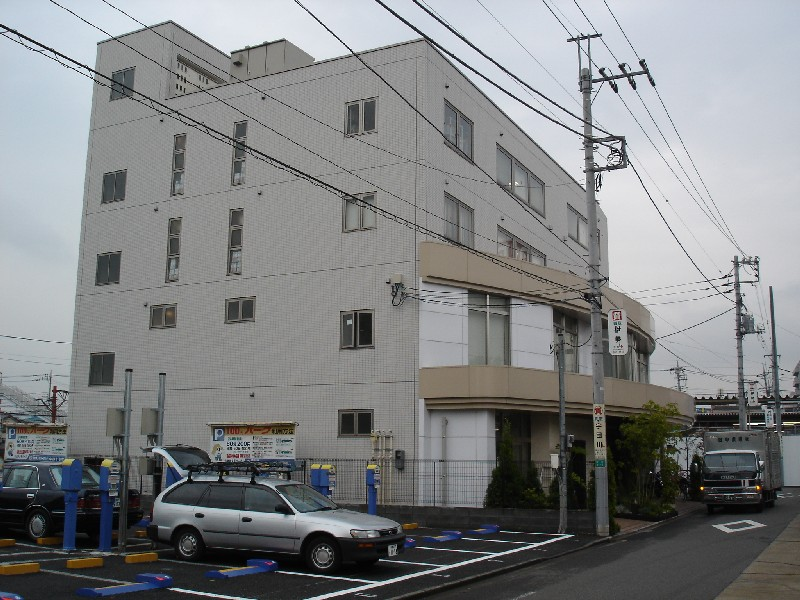
Gainax's offices in Koganei, Tokyo, c. 2004. The studio since moved to a modest two-story premises in Mitaka, before moving again to another premises.

In 1995, Gainax produced perhaps their best known series, the commercially successful and critically lauded Neon Genesis Evangelion. In the wake of Evangelion's success, however, Gainax was audited by the National Tax Agency at the urging of the Tokyo Regional Taxation Bureau on suspicion of committing tax evasion on the massive profits accruing from various Evangelion properties. It was later revealed that Gainax had concealed ¥1.56 billion worth of income (thereby failing to pay ¥560 million due in corporate taxes) which it had earned between the release of Evangelion and July 1997 by paying closely related companies various large fees, ostensibly to pay for animation expenses, but then immediately withdrawing 90% of the sums from the other company's accounts as cash and storing it in safe deposit boxes (leaving 10% as a reward for the other company's assistance).

Gainax president Takeshi Sawamura and tax accountant Yoshikatsu Iwasaki were arrested on July 13, 1999, and later jailed for accounting fraud. Yasuhiro Takeda later defended Sawamura's actions as being a reaction to Gainax's perpetually precarious finances and the shaky accounting procedures internally:

Sawamura understood our financial situation better than anyone, so when Evangelion took off and the money really started rolling in, he saw it as possibly our one and only opportunity to set something aside for the future. I guess he was vulnerable to temptation at that point, because no one knew how long the Evangelion goose would keep laying golden eggs. I don't think he purposely set out with the goal of evading taxes. It was more that our level of accounting knowledge wasn't up to the task of dealing with revenues on such a large scale.

=== 21st century ===
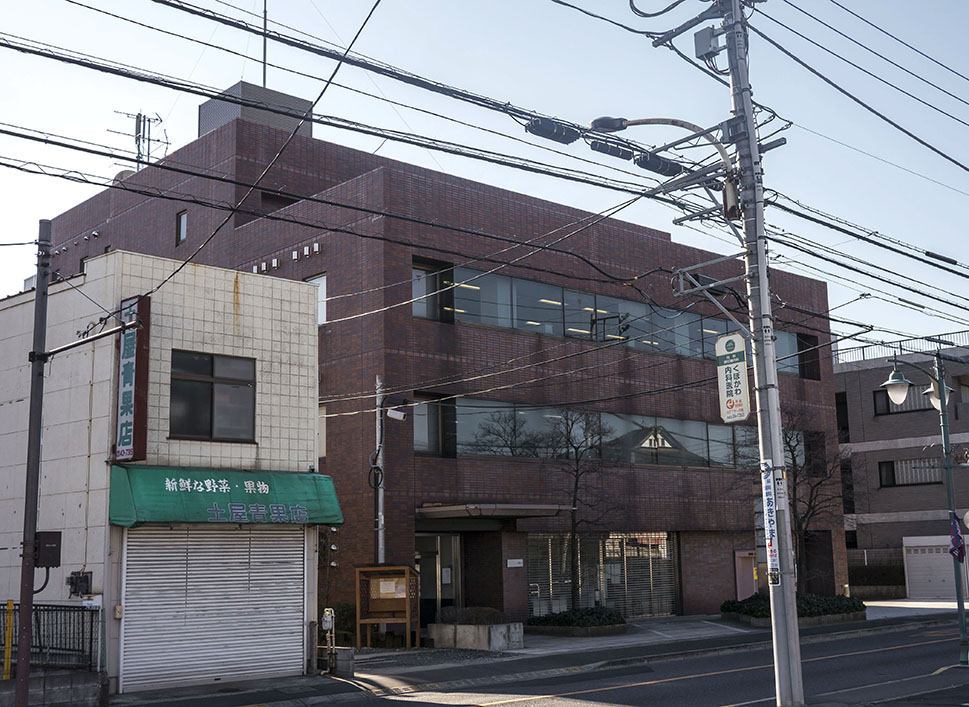
Former Gainax headquarters in Mitaka, Tokyo since 2013. In 2016, Gainax moved to a room in an apartment in Musashino, Tokyo.

In 2004, Gainax marked their 20th anniversary with the production of Diebuster, the sequel to Gunbuster. Gainax had later success with the television anime series Gurren Lagann (2007) and Panty & Stocking with Garterbelt (2010). In August 2011, Gainax was sued by A.D. Vision, which claimed Gainax's refusal to accept an option payment for the perpetual live-action rights to Evangelion was a breach of contract and had resulted in losing an opportunity to produce the film with a major studio. A.D. Vision asked to be awarded the live-action rights to Evangelion and any accruing legal fees.

In 2012, Gainax announced it would be producing its first live-action television series, EA's Rock, with director Nobuhiro Yamashita. At the 2013 Tokyo Anime Fair, Gainax announced that they would be producing the film Blue Uru, with Hiroyuki Yamaga as director and screenwriter and Yoshiyuki Sadamoto as character designer. In March 2015, a new studio and museum called Fukushima Gainax was opened in Miharu, Fukushima.

In 2016, Gainax was sued by Studio Khara for ¥100 million in unpaid royalties from an agreement that Khara would earn royalties from income received on works and properties that founder Hideaki Anno had worked on. The suit alleged that Gainax delayed on paying royalties and incurred a large debt with Khara, which had loaned ¥100 million in August 2014, but had yet to receive payment on the loan. In 2017 the suit was ruled on by a judge at the Tokyo District Court which ordered Gainax to pay the full amount in debt owed to Khara. Further, it was reported that Gainax was not expected to appeal the ruling. Gainax president Hiroyuki Yamaga posted a public apology on the Gainax website stating the company was now undergoing restructuring. In December 2019, Anno claimed no one from Gainax had yet contacted him personally with any kind of apology or explanation.

In August 2018, it was announced that Fukushima Gainax had been acquired by Kinoshita Group Holdings on July 26, making it Kinoshita's new subsidiary. Fukushima Gainax changed its studio name to Gaina and relocated to Koganei, Tokyo on August 9. In December 2019, representative director Tomohiro Maki was arrested on allegations of quasi-forcible indecency on an aspiring voice actress. Maki had been appointed representative director in October, but had been a board director of the company since 2015 and previously served as head of Gainax International, a separate company that trained voice actors and other talents, at the time of the alleged incidents.

=== Decline, bankruptcy and dissolution ===
Maki's arrest caused Gainax to cease production while still being saddled with debt. Gainax's largest creditor, Hideaki Anno's Khara, arranged to restructure the company's board and audit its finances. In February 2020, Groundworks representative director Yasuhiro Kamimura was appointed the company's new representative director and a new board of directors was hired on to the company with Yuko Takaishi (Kadokawa Anime Business Department Anime Production Division head), Atsushi Moriyama (King Records Rights Division senior operating officer), and Yoshiki Usa (Trigger representative director vice president) chosen to serve on the board. In December 2020, it was reported that Tomohiro Maki has been sentenced to 2.5 years in prison for committing indecent acts.

In the midst of the restructuring work, Gainax was sued by a debt collection company which had purchased debt from other creditors. On June 7, 2024, Gainax announced that it had filed for bankruptcy on May 29 and ceased all of its operations, citing financial mismanagement decisions and substantial debt accumulation (which as of 2020 was over ¥380 million). The Gainax trademark was transferred to Khara, who instructed the company to transfer the remaining Gainax properties to their owners. The company was formally dissolved on December 11, 2025. In a statement, Hideaki Anno recapitulated the mismanagement by Gainax's co-founders and thanked Yasuhiro Kamimura for his meticulous handling of financial issues which allowed the studio's works to be transferred to their "rightful owners" instead of being scattered among debt collection companies.

== Filmography ==
=== TV series ===
Title	Year(s)	Director(s)	Broadcast network(s)	(Co-)animated by
Nadia: The Secret of Blue Water	1990–1991	Hideaki Anno	NHK	Group TAC; Sei Young Animation
Neon Genesis Evangelion	1995–1996	Hideaki Anno	TV Tokyo	Tatsunoko
Kare Kano	1998–1999	Hideaki Anno; Hiroki Sato (16–26)	TV Tokyo	J.C.Staff
Modern Love's Silliness	1999	Issei Kume	DirecTV	Group TAC
Oruchuban Ebichu	1999	Makoto Moriwaki	DirecTV, tvk	Group TAC
Mahoromatic	2001–2003, 2009	Hiroyuki Yamaga; Shouji Saeki (Specials)	BS-i	Shaft
Magical Shopping Arcade Abenobashi	2002	Hiroyuki Yamaga	Kids Station, Sun TV, KBS, tvk, TV Saitama	Madhouse
Petite Princess Yucie	2002–2003	Masahiko Otsuka	NHK	AIC
This Ugly yet Beautiful World	2004	Shouji Saeki	BS-i	Shaft
He Is My Master	2005	Shouji Saeki	BS-i	Shaft
Gurren Lagann	2007	Hiroyuki Imaishi	TV Tokyo	
Corpse Princess	2008–2009	Masahiko Murata	AT-X	Feel
Hanamaru Kindergarten	2010	Seiji Mizushima	TV Tokyo	
Panty & Stocking with Garterbelt	2010	Hiroyuki Imaishi	BS Nittele	
The Mystic Archives of Dantalian	2011	Yutaka Uemura	TV Tokyo	
Medaka Box / Medaka Box Abnormal	2012	Shouji Saeki	TV Tokyo, TV Aichi, TV Osaka	
Stella Women's Academy, High School Division Class C³	2013	Masayoshi Kawajiri	TBS, Sun TV, CBC, BS-TBS	
Magica Wars	2014	Ayano Ohnoki	Tokyo MX, BS11	
Wish Upon the Pleiades	2015	Shouji Saeki	ABC, Tokyo MX, GTV, GYT, BS Fuji, AT-X	

=== Films ===
Title	Year(s)	Director(s)	Co-production companies	Notes
Royal Space Force: The Wings of Honnêamise	1987	Hiroyuki Yamaga		
Nadia: The Movie	1991	Sho Aono	Sei Young	
Evangelion: Death and Rebirth	1997	Hideaki Anno; Masayuki; Kazuya Tsurumaki	Tatsunoko (Death); Production I.G (Rebirth)	
The End of Evangelion	1997	Hideaki Anno; Kazuya Tsurumaki	Production I.G	
Revival of Evangelion	1999	Hideaki Anno	Production I.G	
Cutie Honey	2004	Hideaki Anno		Opening animation
Gunbuster vs. Diebuster	2006	Hideaki Anno; Kazuya Tsurumaki		
Gekijōban Tengen Toppa Gurren Lagann (Two-part movie series)	2008–2009	Hiroyuki Imaishi		
Zero Century (Three-part movie series)	Cancelled	Hiroyuki Yamaga	Production Good Book	A film trilogy based on Leiji Matsumoto's works Gainax Kyoto

=== OVAs and ONAs ===
Title	Year	Director	Co-production	Notes
Appleseed	1988	Kazuyoshi Katayama		
Mahjong Hishō-den: Naki no Ryū	1988–1990	Satoshi Dezaki	Magic Bus	
Gunbuster	1988–1989	Hideaki Anno		
Beat Shot	1989	Takashi Akimoto		
Circuit no Ohkami 2 Modena no Tsurugi	1990	Yoshihide Kuriyama		
Honō no Tenkōsei	1991	Katsuhiko Nishijima		
Mahjong Hishō-den – Naki no Ryū: Hiryū no Shō	1991	Satoshi Dezaki	Magic Bus	
Money Wars	1991	Yusaku Saotome		
Otaku no Video	1991	Takeshi Mori		
FLCL	2000	Kazuya Tsurumaki	Production I.G	
Anime Tenchou	2002	Hiroyuki Imaishi		
Re: Cutie Honey	2004	Hideaki Anno	Toei Animation	
Diebuster	2004	Kazuya Tsurumaki		
.hack//Quantum	2011-2012	Masaki Tachibana	Kinema Citrus	Production cooperation only
Wish Upon the Pleiades	2011	Shouji Saeki		

=== Video games ===
Title	Year	Animation	Game developed	Platform
Magic Pengel: The Quest for Color	2002	Studio Ghibli	Taito; Garakuta-Studio; Agetec	PlayStation 2
.hack	2002-2003 2006-2007		CyberConnect2	PlayStation 2

=== Daicon tokusatsu fan films ===
Title	Year	Synopsis
Patriotic Squadron Dai-Nippon (愛国戦隊大日本, Aikoku Sentai Dai-Nippon)	1982	Parody of the popular Super Sentai shows (mostly from footage in Taiyo Sentai Sun Vulcan) and the Russo-Japanese War, with the members of the title team (AiKamikaze, AiHarakiri, AiSukiyaki, AiGeisha, and AiTenpura) fighting the evil plan of the Red Bear Empire (led by "Death Kremlin") to brainwash the children of Japan by replacing the pages of their textbooks with red paper in this "episode".
Swift Hero Noutenki (快傑のーてんき, Kaiketsu Nōtenki)	1982	Parody of Shotaro Ishinomori's Kaiketsu Zubat
Return of Ultraman (帰ってきたウルトラマン, Kaettekita Urutoraman)	1983	Parody of a title of the same name, with New Ultraman/Ultraman Jack portrayed by Hideaki Anno wearing a jacket with Ultraman's signature red and silver pattern.
Kaiketsu Nōtenki 2 – Pure Love in Minato City (快傑の-てんき2 純愛港町篇, Kaiketsu Nōtenki 2 – Junai Minato-cho Hen)	1984	Parody of Shotaro Ishinomori's Kaiketsu Zubat, in which the titular hero faces off against Mecha Noutenki, a mechanical clone of himself.
Kaiketsu Nōtenki in USA (快傑の-てんき in USA)	1984	Parody of Shotaro Ishinomori's Kaiketsu Zubat, in which the titular hero sightsees in San Francisco, California (while in costume)
The Eight-Headed Giant Serpent Strikes Back (八岐之大蛇の逆襲, Yamata no Orochi no Gyakushū)	1985	A 72-minute sendup of daikaiju (giant monster) movies and the most heavily promoted of the Daicon tokusatsu short films.
Roleplaying Nōtenki in Seoul (ロールプレイングの-てんき in ソウル)	1988	Role-playing parody of Shotaro Ishinomori's Kaiketsu Zubat, in which the titular hero sightsees in San Francisco, California (while in costume)

== Other works ==
Gainax had some involvement with K.O. Beast directed by Hiroshi Negishi. It teamed with other groups to create various works, such as a 1987 promotional video for the song "Marionette" by Boøwy and the 2006 Momoko-based "Gainax Girls" fashion dolls created in collaboration with a Japanese fashion doll. Gainax also collaborated with Game Arts in 1992, resulting in the video game Alisia Dragoon. In 2004, Gainax penned Melody of Oblivion for J.C.Staff. Gainax has also produced a number of computer games, including a strip mahjong game featuring Evangelion characters and its most famous, the Princess Maker series (later adapted as Puchi Puri Yūshi). It collaborated with Saudi Arabian media content company ARiNAT on a three-minute anime trailer titled "Desert Knight" (Sabaku no Kishi), which debuted at the "ANI:ME" Japanese pop culture festival in Abu Dhabi in the United Arab Emirates. Gainax also created the Mahoromatic Digital Maiden 1–3 PC game series in 1998 which allowed Konami to publish the PS2 game exclusive Mahoromatic in Japan that is lesser known to the public.
