= Toshio Okada =

Japanese producer, author, and lecturer

- 岡田 斗司夫
- Born: July 1, 1958 (age 68); Sumiyoshi-ku, Osaka, Japan
- Occupations: Producer, essayist, businessman, critic, planner
- Spouse: Kazumi Okada (1989–1999)
- Children: Shizuka Okada
- Writing career
- Pen name: Otaking (オタキング)
- Language: Japanese
- Genres: Biography; Essay; Assessment
- Subjects: Subculture; Science fiction Film; Humanities; Social science
- Notable works: Introduction to Otakuology; Japan Otaku Award; Don't Think You Have To Be Fat Forever
- Website: blog.livedoor.jp/okada_toshio/

Toshio Okada (岡田 斗司夫, Okada Toshio; born July 1, 1958) is an anime producer, author, and lecturer. He is a co-founder and former president of the production company Gainax. He is portrayed by actor Gaku Hamada in the 2014 J-drama Aoi Honō based on the autobiographical manga by his fellow Kazuhiko Shimamoto. He is representative director of Otaking Inc. and Cloud City Inc., as well as the founder of FREEex Inc. He also served as a part-time lecturer at the University of Tokyo's college of art and sciences and as a visiting scholar at Osaka University of Arts' character creative arts department.

== Biography ==
=== Childhood ===
Okada was born on July 1, 1958, in Osaka, Japan. He has written several Japanese-language books on otaku culture, and lectured on the topic as an adjunct instructor at University of Tokyo from 1996 to 1997. He is considered the foremost authority on otaku and in addition, in a tribute to his own otaku-ness (Note: "In those days, we didn't have the word "otaku" yet, but my first impression of Okada was, Here's a geek if I've ever seen one.' With his girly long hair and his freakishly excited way of speaking, all I could think was, This guy is exactly like me?") has been called "Otaking" amongst his colleagues and fellow otaku.

=== University, Daicon Film and General Products ===
Okada was admitted to Osaka Electro-Communication University to learn to use computer in 1978, but he could not obtain any credits in the first year because he had forgotten to hand in his course registration form. For this reason, he stopped completing all the courses necessary for a university degree, and he joined a group of SF fans and went into its activity. He lived on a monthly allowance from his parents who did not know of his dropping out. In the same year, he saw Star Wars as he was dressed as Darth Vader.

In 1981, his group promoted 20th Japanese SF convention (aka Daicon III), and he put DAICON III Opening Animation on the screen. Okada and Yasuhiro Takeda and their group established "Daicon Film" as an anime producing team and commissioned undergraduates of Osaka University of Arts to produce DAICON III and IV Opening Animations for the SF convention. Hideaki Anno, Takami Akai, and Hiroyuki Yamaga who were undergraduates of that university worked on those animations.

Okada realized that he could make a business out of selling SciFi products because he made a large profit selling garage kits and videos of opening animations at this convention. In 1981, he was formally expelled from his university. On February 14, 1982, he opened General Products as a part of his parents company to sell SF Goods in Osaka. Before opening his shop, he borrowed money from his parents and got permission to use term of general products from Larry Niven. In this year, he got married.

=== Gainax ===
In 1986, he established Gainax as an Anime studio and isolated General Products from his parents company. Okada assumed office as CEO of Gainax and Yasuhiro Takeda assumed office as CEO of General Products. In 1989, Okada's first child was born, a daughter. In 1992, Okada retired from Gainax.

== Works ==
=== Anime ===
Title	Year	Post
Daicon III Opening Film	1981	Planner
Daicon IV Opening Film	1983	Planner
Royal Space Force: The Wings of Honnêamise	1987	Planner
Gunbuster	1988	Scriptwriter
Otaku no Video	1991	Scriptwriter; Planner

=== Books ===
Japanese Title	English Title	Year	ISBN
ぼくたちの洗脳社会; Bokutachi No Sennou Shakai	Our Brainwashing Society	1995	4-02-261244-4
オタク学入門; Otaku-gaku Nyumon	Introduction to Otakuology	1996	4-10-290019-5
東大オタク学講座; Toudai Otaku-gaku Kouza	University of Tokyo Otaku Studies Course	1997	4-06-208292-6
国際おたく大学 1998年 最前線からの研究報告; Kokusai Otaku-gaku 1998-nen Saizensen Kara No Kenkyuuhoukusha	International Otaku Studies: 1998 Report From The Front Line	1998	4-334-97182-2
失われた未来; Ushinawareta Mirai	Lost Future	2000	4-620-31450-1
フロン 結婚生活・19の絶対法則; Furon Kekkon Seikatsu: 19 No Zettai Housoku	Furon Married Life: 19 Absolute Rules	2001	4-907727-19-4
日本オタク大賞; Nippon Otaku Taishou	Japan Otaku Award	2003	4-594-03900-6
恋愛自由市場主義宣言!—確実に「ラブ」と「セックス」を手に入れる鉄則; Renai Jyuushijyou Shuki Senken! Kakujitsu Ni "Rabu" To "Sekkusu" Wo Te Ni Ireru Tessoku	Declaration of Love's Free-market Principles! Absolute Rules Certain To Obtain "Love" and "Sex"	2003	4-8211-0842-9
プチクリ!—好き=才能! Puchikuri Suki = Sainou!	Little Creator: Love = Talent!	2005	4-344-01082-5
世界征服」は可能か? Sekaiseifuku Wa Kanouka?	Is World Conquest Possible?	2007	4-480-68762-9
いつまでもデブと思うなよ; Itsu Made Mo Debu To Omou Na Yo	Don't Think You Have To Be Fat Forever	2007	4-10-610227-7
オタクはすでに死んでいる; Otaku Wa Sude Ni Shindeiru	You Otaku Are Already Dead	2008	4-10-610258-7

=== Video games ===
Title	Year	Post
Cybernetic Hi-School	1989	Planner
Cybernetic Hi-School Scenario I Ver2.0	1989	Planner
Cybernetic Hi-School II	1989	Planner
Cybernetic Hi-School III	1990	Planner
Cybernetic Hi-School IV	1991	Planner

=== Movie ===
Title	Year	Post
Aikoku Sentai Dai Nippon	1982	Scriptwriter
Kaiketsu Noutenki	1982	Actor (as Goro Asuka)
The Return of Ultraman	1983	Scriptwriter
Noutenki in USA	1984	Director

== Career ==
Post	Period	Organization
Shop manager	1982–1984	General Products
President	1984–1992	Gainax Company, Limited
Visiting scholar	2005–2015	Character Creative Arts Department, Osaka University of Arts
Lecturer	2003	Massachusetts Institute of Technology
President	1997–current	Otaking Co., Ltd
Part‐time teacher	1994–1995	College of Arts and Sciences, University of Tokyo
President	2011–current	Cloud City Co., Ltd
