= Yasuhiro Takeda =

Japanese anime director

The Gainax employee Yasuhiro Takeda should not be confused with the professor of the same name at National Defense Academy of Japan.

Yasuhiro Takeda (武田 康廣, Takeda Yasuhiro; born 12 September 1957 in Tadaoka, Osaka) is a Japanese anime director and founding member of Gainax; for most of his career, he was General Manager. He is also a two-time chair of the Nihon SF Taikai (DAICON III and the 1988 Mig.Con).

In April 1976, he enrolled in Kinki University for nuclear engineering, but began neglecting studies (repeating his sophomore year) when he joined the sci-fi club in April 1977 and became active in organizing clubs, founding the "Confederation of Kansai Student Sci-Fi Clubs". It was through these early activities that Takeda met many other fans, some who would become more involved: at his first convention, Seto-Con ("Sci-Fi Festival 78"), Takeda met Toshio Okada. In November 1990, he married the Japanese writer Hiroe Suga.

In 2002, he published a memoir/autobiography about his life (particularly focusing on his college life, involvement in science fiction conventions, and his subsequent career) named The Notenki Memoirs; the name Notenki is an old nickname of Takeda's, derived from his part in Kaiketsu Noutenki.

He is portrayed by actor Gitaro in the 2014 TV Drama Aoi Honō based on the autobiographical manga by Kazuhiko Shimamoto, which follows the college years of the future Gainax team.
