= Diebuster =

Japanese original video animation series

- Official DVD cover from Discotek

トップをねらえ 2! (Toppu o Nerae TSŪ!)
- Genre: Mecha; Yuri
- Created by: Gainax (Note: Original Work (原作)); Kazuya Tsurumaki (Note: Original Plan (原案))
- Prequel
- Gunbuster
- Original video animation
- Directed by: Kazuya Tsurumaki
- Produced by: Shirō Sasaki; Hisanori Kunisaki; Yasuhiro Takeda; Takeshi Yasuda
- Written by: Yōji Enokido
- Music by: Kohei Tanaka
- Studio: Gainax
- Licensed by: EU: Beez Entertainment; NA: Bandai Visual USA (former) Discotek Media
- Released: November 26, 2004 – August 25, 2006
- Runtime: 27–31 minutes
- Episodes: 6
- Anime film

Diebuster: The Movie
- Directed by: Kazuya Tsurumaki
- Written by: Yoji Enokido
- Music by: Kohei Tanaka
- Studio: Gainax
- Licensed by: EU: Beez Entertainment; NA: Bandai Visual USA (former) Sentai Filmworks
- Released: October 1, 2006
- Runtime: 95 minutes
- Manga
- Written by: Kazuya Tsurumaki
- Published by: Fujimi Shobo
- Magazine: Dragon Age Pure
- Original run: 2006 – 2007
- Volumes: 1

Diebuster, also known as Aim for the Top 2! (トップをねらえ 2!, Toppu o Nerae Tsū!) and Gunbuster 2, is a Japanese original video animation (OVA) series directed by Kazuya Tsurumaki, written by Yōji Enokido, and animated by Gainax. It was created to commemorate the studio's 20th anniversary in 2004, and is a sequel to their 1988 OVA Gunbuster.

A compilation film, titled Gunbuster vs. Diebuster: Aim for the Top! - The Gattai!! Movie (トップをねらえ!&トップをねらえ2! 合体劇場版!!, Toppu wo Nerae! & Toppu wo Nerae 2! Gattai Gekijōban!!), which condenses Gunbuster and Diebuster into two feature-length films, was released on October 1, 2006.

It was licensed for American release by Bandai Visual USA as Gunbuster 2. Discotek Media has since re-licensed Diebuster as Gunbuster 2: Diebuster, which was released on May 21, 2013. A manga adaptation of the series is available in Japan.

== Story ==
Top o Nerae 2! Diebuster follows the story of Nono, a country girl who dreams of becoming a space pilot (or, to be more precise, "like Nonoriri", the meaning of which is revealed as the series progresses) and who, due to a chance encounter with an actual space pilot, finds herself becoming part of the elite Fraternity. Made up of teenage pilots called Topless, and armed with quasi-humanoid weapons called Buster Machines, the Fraternity's mission is to protect the people of the Solar System from attack by swarms of space monsters.

After dealing with the swarms of space monsters, and the personal conflicts of the Topless themselves, the empire discovers the threat of another space monster when the Serpentine Sisters attempt to awaken something they call "an eternal Topless", which could destroy the space monsters for them and provide them with a way to keep from ever losing their Topless power. This so-called "Topless" is a true space monster, as Lal'C learns when she witnesses its vicious attacks against her comrades. During these events, Nono's potent powers as Buster Machine no. 7 awaken, and she and the Topless defeat the real space monster. They encounter the last of the space monsters carrying a black hole and using it as a method for warping space.

The Space Monster warps closer to Earth, and Nono suddenly departs with the Solar Defence Force, seemingly vanishing from the system. The empire decides to use Earth as a weapon to destroy the final Space Monster to ensure their survival. She and the remainder of the Topless prepare for the Space Monster's arrival and the timely intervention of Nono, who now becomes the mega-android Diebuster. Just as she is about to land a finishing blow using Douze-Mille's reformed components as a Buster Machine, her Topless powers suddenly expire. "Diebuster" attempts to attack the Space Monster, but to no effect, and the monster vaporizes Diebuster's hands. Dix-Neuf moves on his own to help Lal'C access the cockpit in his brain, activating his true form and coaxing Nono to come out of the disintegrating "Diebuster" and fight with her. With the two girls together once more and Dix-Neuf's new powers, they defeat the final Space Monster with a Double Inazuma Kick.

The black hole tears open due to the Space Monster's death. Nono and Lal'C share one last moment, their hopes, dreams, and futures if they had survived. Nono finally gives Lal'C a piece of her generator, or singularity, in the form of an origami crane, before using the remnants of the Alternate Buster Machines that comprised "Diebuster" to warp the black hole and herself away from Earth. Dix-Neuf saves Lal'C and brings her back to civilization, where she weeps at the loss of Nono.

Ten years later, Lal'C becomes an environmentalist and her Topless comrades have moved on from their previous life. She stays on a hilltop on the Okinawan coastline, musing about Nono before the city's lights shut off. She stares into the starry sky, and it is revealed all along that Nono and Lal'C's timeline is the setting of the last episode of the first Gunbuster OVA, as told by Lal'C when she first muses about Nono. Its two pilots, Noriko Takaya and Kazumi Amano, descend from the remnants of the first-ever Buster Machine, and Lal'C vows to tell Noriko about Nono's life and her sacrifice.

=== Episode list ===
| No. | Title | Original release date |
|---|---|---|
| 1 | "Please Let Me Call You Big Sister!"; Transliteration: "Onee-sama to Yobasete Kudasai!" (Japanese: お姉さまと呼ばせてください!) | November 26, 2004 |
| 2 | "Don't Call Me Big Sis!"; Transliteration: "Onee-sama Nanka ni Naritakunai!" (Japanese: お姉さまなんかになりたくない) | February 24, 2005 |
| 3 | "I Hate Topless!"; Transliteration: "Topless Nante Daikirai!" (Japanese: トップレスなんて大嫌い) | June 24, 2005 |
| 4 | "Resurrection! The Legendary Buster Machine!"; Transliteration: "Fukkatsu! Densetsu no Buster Machine!" (Japanese: 復活!! 伝説のバスターマシン!) | October 28, 2005 |
| 5 | "Mover of Planets"; Transliteration: "Hoshi wo Ugokasumono" (Japanese: 星を動かすもの) | March 24, 2006 |
| 6 | "The Story of Your Life"; Transliteration: "Anata no jinsei no Monogatari" (Japanese: あなたの人生の物語) | August 25, 2006 |

== Characters ==
Nono, Lal'C, and Buster Machine Dix Neuf

=== Nono (ノノ, Nono) ===
Voiced by: Yukari Fukui

Hailing from a rural community in the Martian countryside, Nono is a simple and clumsy girl with a big dream: she wants to be a space pilot, who can rival "Nonoriri". Of course, dreaming of being a pilot and actually becoming one are two entirely different things, as she soon finds out upon reaching the city. Even after landing a somewhat dead-end job as a waitress in one of the city's bars, Nono stubbornly holds on to her dream, despite the chiding of her boss and the bar's regular patrons. Her persistence pays off when she encounters a real space pilot in the person of Lal'C Mellk Mal, a member of the elite Fraternity and current pilot of Buster Machine Dix-Neuf. It is through Lal'C (whom she impulsively dubs her onee-sama, or big sister) that Nono finally finds the means to make her dream a reality. Possessing a bubbly personality and a near-endless supply of optimism, Nono seems to be a normal, if clumsy, country girl. Nono is anything but normal; she is not even human, but an android, who cannot quite remember the reason why she was built (though much of her past is revealed later in the series). She idolizes Lal'C, even though the latter seems to regard her with mild annoyance, but will do anything to please her. Nono has traced the recorded history of Noriko Takaya and Kazumi Amano (the pilots of Buster Machines 1 and 2) in her memory. The very person she idolizes and wants to become is Noriko. Due to her damaged memory, Nono cannot remember Noriko's actual name and thus pronounces it Nonoriri. Nono's memory of Kazumi is referenced when she calls Lal'C Onee-sama and when Nono makes origami cranes. The final reference to Top o Nerae! from Nono's memory is the catchphrase that she has memorized, "With guts, and effort", spoken in Japanese. Nono sacrifices her life in the last episode by using her generator and the remaining artificial Buster machines to seemingly warp a fatal black hole left in the wake of her climactic battle with Lal'C and the final Space Monster, leaving her legacy in the form of a badly done origami crane.

=== Lal'C Mellk Mal (ラルク・メルク・マール, Raruku Meruku Māru) ===
Voiced by: Maaya Sakamoto

The current holder of the top kill score among Topless pilots, Lal'C, along with fellow pilots Nicola and Tycho, is part of the so-called "Idol" group (pilots with exceptionally high kill rates). She is also the current pilot of Buster Machine Dix-Neuf, the oldest Buster machine still in operation. Nicknamed "princess" by her teammates, Lal'C is outwardly cool and self confident, traits that win Nono's admiration, much to her initial annoyance. It is Lal'C who helps induct Nono (with some indirect assistance from Nicola) into the Fraternity as an "auxiliary member", even though Nono manifests none of the traits associated with being a Topless. While initially bothered by Nono's hero-worship of her, Lal'C quickly gets used to her company, to the point where she can talk about things she would not normally tell anyone. She senses some potential in Nono and admires the girl's never-give-up attitude (though she might act otherwise), but doubts if guts and perseverance alone can make the girl's dream come true. In the epilogue, she is one of the many inhabitants of Earth to welcome Noriko Takaya and Kazumi Amano and presumably passes Nono's legacy and gift to Noriko.

=== Nicola Vacheron (ニコラス・バセロン, Nikorasu Baseron) ===
Voiced by: Mitsuo Iwata

The only male Topless on the 'Idol' team, Nicola is the pilot of Buster Machine Vingt-Sept and, before Lal'C's inclusion into the ranks of the Topless, was considered one of the most powerful Topless of his generation. He is Lal'C's inspiration (inasmuch as Lal'C is Nono's inspiration), and seems to have a relationship with her, though it is debatable whether it is of a romantic nature or not. He is interested in Nono and sees potential in her to be a Buster Machine pilot, Nono has never manifested any kind of Topless reaction (something that, according to their minder Casio, may not be possible in artificial beings), and secretly helps Nono join the Fraternity as an auxiliary member. Considered old among the current Topless (as he is nearing late adolescence), Nicola is already having a hard time manifesting the Exotic Maneuvers needed to power his machine. As such, he seems to secretly be seeking a way to extend his tenure as a Topless, to the point of joining the Serpentine Sisters' inner circle and acting as their watcher over Nono's activities. He ultimately loses his ability to pilot the Buster Machine and attempts to sexually assault Nono in the belief that she is close enough to a Buster Machine. He soon becomes a lieutenant in the empire. His fate in the final episode is unknown.

=== Tycho Science (チコ・サイエンス, Chiko Saiensu) ===
Voiced by: Miyuki Sawashiro

The final member of the Idol team, Tycho is brash, impulsive, and utterly determined (at least in the beginning) to best Lal'C's longstanding kill record, seeing it as a chance to wipe the normally smug look off the face of the teacher's pet (another of Lal'C's nicknames among the members of the Fraternity). She has a low opinion of Topless in general (even though she is Topless herself) due to an event in her childhood where, despite her powers, she was unable to cure the illness of a close friend and is annoyed by Nono's constant attempts to prove herself worthy to become a Buster Machine pilot. Ironically, it is Nono who later helps her change thinking for the better. While it is not outwardly implied, the two become friends, though not on the same level as Nono and Lal'C. Initially, Tycho pilots the Buster Machine No.66: Soixante-Six, but it is destroyed when (against orders) she uses it to impulsively attack the Jupiter Express (a massive swarm of space monsters that roamed the space between Jupiter and Saturn). After a period of self-doubt, she awakens Buster Machine Quatre-Vingt-Dix, and it remains her machine for the rest of the series. In the epilogue, Tycho becomes an emissary of Earth and travels to various systems with the corps. She is not present during the homecoming of Noriko and Kazumi.

=== Casio Takashiro (カシオ・タカシロウ, Kashio Takashirō) ===
Voiced by: Takumi Yamazaki

The only adult member of the Idol team, Casio is their guardian, technician, and confidant. A former Topless himself (he was a pilot of Dix-Neuf before Lal'C joined the Fraternity), Casio possesses an intimate understanding of the workings of the Buster Machines, as well as the people who pilot them. That is part of why he was one of the first to express his doubts of Nicola's assertion that Nono had the potential to become a pilot. Despite his initial misgivings, he joins Lal'C in welcoming Nono onto their team. Despite being a lech and a joker, Casio can be surprisingly serious when the situation merits it. He secretly yearns to pilot a Buster Machine again but is resigned to the fact that he can only be near them, due to his advanced age. He is aware of the shady activities of the Serpentine Sisters, but not the exact details of their "project". Casio's fate at the end of the series is unknown, but he presumably remains an engineer in the empire.

=== The Serpentine Sisters (サーペンタイン姉妹, Sāpentain Shimai) ===
Voiced by: Sanae Kobayashi and Yuki Matsuoka

Two highly mysterious members of Topless, the Serpentine Sisters are the oldest living Topless. They plan to awaken something inside the moon Titan that will give them the secret to eternal Topless powers and are revealed to consume its meat to prolong their powers until they can awaken the "fluctuating gravity well", as they call it. Their true motivation for needing these powers is the fact that without them, they might lose their close connection.

== Production ==
In 2004, Kazuya Tsurumaki directed Diebuster. Before coming to Gainax, he was a fan of Gunbuster. When it came time to create the second part of the story, he decided to offer his assistance. When Yūichirō Oguro interviewed Tsurumaki on August 15, 2006, Tsurumaki told Oguro that it is not that he genuinely believed in "hard work and guts" (努力と根性, doryoku to konjō), but that he enjoyed humorous parts being included with serious parts. Tsurumaki said the Science Lesson segments depicted Noriko as an otaku; conversely, Diebuster did not have such a connection. Moreover, when he worked on Neon Genesis Evangelion, he was not thought of as an otaku. He thought that it was acceptable not to be an otaku and was working for other people who were not otaku. Additionally, he believed the Science Lessons segments exemplified otaku pride and appreciated Hiroyuki Yamaga and Hideaki Anno's shift of the story.

The anime was created to commemorate the 20th anniversary of the founding of Gainax. Tsurumaki previously worked on FLCL and provided his plan and direction. Yoshiyuki Sadamoto designed the characters, Yoshitsune Izuna designed the Buster Machines, Yōji Enokido wrote the screenplay, and Anno provided supervision.

== Music and theme songs ==
The music was composed and conducted by Kōhei Tanaka, the composer of Gunbuster.

Opening Theme

- "Groovin' Magic", by Round Table feat. Nino

- Lyrics: Reiko Itō
- Music: Reiko Itō
- Arrangement: Round Table feat. Nino

Ending Theme

- "Hoshikuzu Namida" (星屑涙; "Stardust Tears"), by Acko

- Lyrics: Acko
- Music: Rui Nagai
- Arrangement: Rui Nagai

== Reception ==
Joseph Luster of Otaku USA Magazine stated that Kazuya Tsurumaki's work on FLCL strongly influenced the presentation of Diebuster and that fans of FLCL would therefore appreciate Diebuster. He also said that Diebuster is "unlike any children-pilot-mechs-and-fight-aliens show before it." He praised the visual designs and motion of the anime and compared this anime to Gunbuster and Gad Guard. Niels Matthijs of Screen Anarchy said that Diebuster is "an update of the source material to match the need of [more recent] anime viewer[s]". He compared the appearance of Diebuster to that of FLCL and Magical Shopping Arcade Abenobashi, thought Diebuster's story was typical for an anime, criticized the decline in quality of the animation, called the soundtrack "quite forgettable", and considered the voice-acting lackluster. THEM Anime Reviews's Bradley Meek wrote that only people who have seen Gunbuster would understand a plot twist that happens in Diebuster, and he wondered if Diebuster could have been better had it been a standalone story. He commended the presentation of the battles, the appearance of Nono, and Nono's connection to Lal'C. Conversely, he said much of the story was confusing.

Theron Martin of Anime News Network called the series a "reimagining" of its predecessor; commended the boldness, diversion, and animation of the series; and wrote that the series looks similar to FLCL. He wrote that the final episode seemed preposterous, illustrating his example with a traffic accident; and said that without knowledge of Gunbuster, key plot points make little sense. According to him, the last two episodes connect with the original series the most. When he reviewed Gunbuster vs. Diebuster Aim for the Top! The Gattai Movie, he remarked that the omission of some of the content in the Diebuster segment may exasperate some viewers, but viewers may notice similarities with FLCL. He wrote that unlike the Gunbuster segment that focuses on "the Rip Van Winkle effect", the Diebuster segment focuses on conflict and growth among characters.
