= Royal Space Force: The Wings of Honnêamise =

1987 animated film by Hiroyuki Yamaga

- Theatrical release poster

Japanese name
- Kanji: 王立宇宙軍~オネアミスの翼
Transcriptions
- Revised Hepburn: Ōritsu Uchūgun: Oneamisu no Tsubasa
- Directed by: Hiroyuki Yamaga
- Written by: Hiroyuki Yamaga
- Produced by: Hirohiko Sueyoshi; Hiroaki Inoue
- Starring: Leo Morimoto; Mitsuki Yayoi
- Cinematography: Hiroshi Isakawa
- Edited by: Harutoshi Ogata
- Music by: Ryuichi Sakamoto; Yuji Nomi; Koji Ueno; Haruo Kubota
- Production companies: Gainax; Bandai Home Video
- Distributed by: Toho-Towa
- Release dates: February 19, 1987 (Los Angeles); March 14, 1987 (Japan)
- Running time: 119 minutes
- Country: Japan
- Language: Japanese
- Budget: ¥800 million
- Box office: ¥347 million (Note: Toshio Okada has stated that movie theater ticket sales were "only about 120 or 150 million" yen.)

Royal Space Force: The Wings of Honnêamise (Japanese: 王立宇宙軍~オネアミスの翼, Hepburn: Ōritsu Uchūgun: Oneamisu no Tsubasa) is a 1987 Japanese animated science fiction film written and directed by Hiroyuki Yamaga, co-produced by Hiroaki Inoue and Hiroyuki Sueyoshi, and planned by Toshio Okada and Shigeru Watanabe, with music by Ryuichi Sakamoto. The story takes place in an alternate world where a disengaged young man, Shirotsugh, inspired by an idealistic woman, Riquinni, volunteers to become the first astronaut. The film was the debut by the studio Gainax, and the first anime produced by Bandai. (Note: A 1995 New York Times article remarked that Bandai was the sponsor of 18 out of the 35 half-hour anime TV series then airing on Japanese television.)

Royal Space Force was produced over four years and involved many creators, including some from outside the anime industry, to construct a detailed alternate world. Its collective approach to filmmaking, rejection of anime motifs, visual complexity, and inexperienced staff were all factors in its chaotic production. Its investors changed the name The Wings of Honnêamise and created lavish but deceptive marketing, with a premiere at Mann's Chinese Theatre.

Royal Space Force was released in Japan on March 14, 1987, by the Toho subsidiary Toho-Towa. It received some support from domestic anime fans and industry figures including Hayao Miyazaki, and Mamoru Oshii. The science fiction writer Ted Chiang described Royal Space Force as the most impressive example of worldbuilding in fiction. It failed to make back its costs at the box office, but eventually became profitable through home video sales. The anime director Hideaki Anno said the response had a major impact on him personally and professionally.

Royal Space Force did not receive an English-language release until 1994, when Bandai licensed it to Manga Entertainment. A dubbed 35 mm version toured theaters in North America and the United Kingdom, and received coverage in major newspapers but mixed reviews. It was released several times in English on home video. Various surveys of anime have regarded the film more positively; Yamaga said in retrospect that the elements which made Royal Space Force unsuccessful made possible the later successes of Studio Gainax. (Note: When asked in 2004 to state what had been "the biggest thing that happened" to him at Gainax, Neon Genesis Evangelion director Hideaki Anno cited two things: "the company managing to stay together" after the production of Royal Space Force, and "resisting the urge to resign from my job even after the Aoki Uru project [the sequel to Royal Space Force] was put on indefinite hold.")

== Plot ==
In the Kingdom of Honnêamise, on an alternate version of Earth, Shirotsugh Lhadatt is an unmotivated young man who once aspired to be a fighter pilot. He instead joined the Royal Space Force, his nation's fledgling space program, which has been demoralised by numerous failures. After a fellow astronaut dies in training, Lhadatt befriends a young religious woman named Riquinni Nonderaiko, who spends her days street preaching and lives with a sullen child named Manna. Seeing the groundbreaking nature of his work, Riquinni inspires Lhadatt to volunteer for the Space Force's last attempt to send the world's first astronaut into orbit.

Lhadatt's training as an astronaut parallels his coming of age, as he and the rest of the space project members overcome technological difficulties, doubt, overwhelming public attention, and the machinations of their corrupt government. Lhadatt frequently visits Riquinni, who sees the world has succumbed to selfishness and sin, and becomes destitute when her house is foreclosed by a power company, forcing Riquinni and Manna to live in a small shack provided by a local church. Lhadatt studies a holy book Riquinni gifts to him, which asserts that humanity is eternally cursed for having stolen the "fire" of knowledge.

General Khaidenn, commander of the Royal Space Force, rallies public support for the project by lying that they are building a "space warship". The project’s chief engineer, Dr. Gnomm, is killed during an engine test accident, and controversy sparks regarding the project's expense and how it exacerbates the Kingdom's poverty epidemic. Disenchanted and depressed, Lhadatt suddenly goes AWOL and stays with Riquinni for a while. One night, Lhadatt sexually assaults Riquinni while catching her undressing, but he stops himself just before Riquinni knocks him unconscious. Lhadatt begs forgiveness the next day, but Riquinni blames herself before running off. Returning to the city, Lhadatt barely survives an assassination attempt by the Republic, a neighboring nation that is at war with the Kingdom. Before departing for the launch site, Lhadatt finally befriends Manna and says farewell to Riquinni.

The launch site is in a demilitarized zone, where the government hopes that the rocket will provoke the Republic into attacking. Though Khaidenn pushes the launch time forward, the Republic launches an invasion. Lhadatt — already in the space capsule and determined to finish what he started — refuses to abort the launch, and convinces the vulnerable ground crew to complete it. The spectacular launch stuns both sides into inaction.

As his capsule orbits the earth, Lhadatt broadcasts a prayer for humanity's forgiveness. Lhadatt's capsule is suddenly bathed in sunlight, and a montage of his own life and his world's history and achievements are shown. On the planet's surface, Riquinni witnesses the first snow fall and gazes into the sky.

== Cast ==
Character	Japanese	English
Shirotsugh Lhadatt	Leo Morimoto	David A. Thomas
Riquinni Nonderaiko	Mitsuki Yayoi	Heidi Lenhart
Manna Nonderaiko	Aya Murata	Wendee Lee
Marty Tohn	Kazuyuki Sogabe	Bryan Cranston
General Khaidenn	Minoru Uchida	Steve Bulen
Dr. Gnomm	Chikao Ōtsuka	Michael Forest
Kharock	Masato Hirano	Tom Konkle
Yanalan	Bin Shimada	Richard Epcar
Darigan	Hiroshi Izawa	Stephen Apostolina
Domorhot	Hirotaka Suzuoki	Jan Rabson
Tchallichammi	Kouji Totani	Christopher de Groot
Majaho	Masahiro Anzai	Tony Pope
Nekkerout	Yoshito Yasuhara	Dan Woren
Prof. Ronta	Ryūji Saikachi	Steve Blum

== Production ==
The film had a budget of ¥800 million, at the time equivalent to $5,531,000 (equivalent to $16,000,000 in 2025), making it the most expensive anime film up until then. It surpassed the budget records of Hayao Miyazaki's Castle of Cagliostro (1979) and Castle in the Sky (1986).

=== Development ===
Royal Space Force developed out of an anime proposal presented to Shigeru Watanabe of Bandai in September 1984 by Hiroyuki Yamaga and Toshio Okada from Daicon Film, an amateur film studio active in the early 1980s associated with students at the Osaka University of Arts and science fiction fandom in the Kansai region. Okada had first met Watanabe in August 1983 at a convention for tokusatsu fans in Tokyo at which Daicon Film screened their live-action short The Return of Ultraman and ran a sales booth for Daicon's related fan merchandise company, General Products. (Note: In a 2004 interview, Watanabe recalled this meeting as having taken place at the event in 1982 rather than in 1983: "At that same time, the second Special Effects Convention was being held at Suginami Public Hall, and General Products had a booth at the event selling garage kits. I learned a lot from the products they were selling there. It was there that I met Mr. Okada and Mr. Takeda … That was in '82, I think." A contemporary report on the 1982 event thanked General Products for their support of the convention programming.) In a 1998 interview, Yamaga asserted that the success of the company was an impetus that led to the creation of Gainax and the Royal Space Force proposal, as Okada had co-founded General Products with Yasuhiro Takeda but Takeda was now managing it well on his own, leaving Okada to feel he had nothing to do. "I approached Okada, who was feeling a bit down. I was thinking every day about how [Daicon Film's] Sadamoto and Maeda (Note: Maeda, a high school classmate of Daicon Film director and character designer Takami Akai, had attended Tokyo Zokei University with Sadamoto; Maeda and Sadamoto had also worked on the Macross TV series, and both were subsequently recruited into Daicon Film.) are great geniuses. Of course, Anno is a genius, as is Akai. To have one genius in your group is incredible enough, but here we have four of them. I told [Okada] that he would be a fool not to take action. I said that we should do something. We had sacrificed quite a lot for the sake of our independent films as students—we had dropped out of school, we'd lost jobs. So there had always been a desire within us all to see those sacrifices pay off at some point."

Watanabe had been involved with product planning for Bandai's "Real Hobby Series" figurines. The position had also led Watanabe into Bandai's then-new home video label Emotion, where he helped to develop Mamoru Oshii's Dallos. Released at the end of 1983, Dallos would become the first anime original video animation (OVA), an industry event later described as the beginning of a new "third medium" for anime beyond film or television, offering the prospect of "a medium in which [anime] could 'grow up,' allowing the more mature thematic experiments of creators". Okada and Yamaga's pitch to Watanabe had followed the recognition Daicon Film received earlier that year in Animage magazine through a special secondary Anime Grand Prix award given to their 8 mm short Daicon IV Opening Animation. (Note: The award was part of the "Minor Anime Grand Prix" section, in which the Anime Grand Prix's sponsors, Animage, recognized achievements outside the major categories of the main award. The Daicon IV Opening Animation was given that year's prize for the "Local Works" category; the award was made alongside a prize in the "Foreign Works" category for Yuri Norstein's Hedgehog in the Fog, originally released in the Soviet Union in 1975.) (Note: Yamaga perceived an affinity in method between his 1983 short film and his 1987 full-length motion picture: "By the time we made Daicon IV, we had down the basics of the approach we used in Royal Space Force. Daicon IV was an experiment that I had wanted to make, in order to see what the effect would be if I condensed the [creative] wills of many people into a unit of time, and presented that information in a way that the audience could feel it. So most of the things that were quite adventurous in Royal Space Force had already been experimented with in Daicon IV, at least to my mind and Okada's.") Their September 1984 proposal gave the outline for an anime to be entitled Royal Space Force, to be produced under the heading of a new, professional studio to be named Gainax. The proposal listed five initial core staff for the anime. Four had been previously associated with Daicon Film: Yamaga was to be the anime's concept creator and director and Okada its producer, (Note: Although the original 1984 proposal for Royal Space Force listed Okada as its producer, the film as released in 1987 listed Okada, together with Shigeru Watanabe, under the credit kikaku (企画; "planning"), a job described as assisting with the "herculean task" of assisting the producer with all aspects of production management. Okada has however described his role as that of producer in later discussions of Royal Space Force: "But we didn't get back the money. No, I mustn't say we. Bandai didn't get back the money. And of course, it was my responsibility. I was the producer of that film." "From my point of view, I'm the producer, the only one who can be that final breakwater. I'm the president of Gainax, the producer of this film. The buck stops here.") Yoshiyuki Sadamoto its chief character designer, and Hideaki Anno its chief mechanical designer. The fifth, Kenichi Sonoda, listed as responsible for the anime's settei (model sheets, drawn up to give the key animators their guides as to how the objects and people to be animated should look) had previously assisted with product development at General Products. (Note: Okada recalled in 1995, "He made lots of designs for [Royal Space Force]. At first, he was supposed to be one of the main mechanical designers. But I couldn't use his mecha designs because they were too fantastic." Yamaga suggested he instead work on creating the movie's red-light district; Sonoda's designs for it appear in the finished film.)

=== Writing ===
The Royal Space Force proposal, subheaded "Project Intentions: A New Wave in a Time of Lost Collaborative Illusions," began with a self-analysis of "recent animation culture from the perspective of young people". (Note: Gainax's proposal referred to their own generation using both the term wakamono, "young people," and the term yangu (ヤング), "[the] young," a loan word that had become associated with Japanese youth pop culture, as reflected in the launch of such manga magazines in the late 1970s and early 1980s as Weekly Young Jump or Weekly Young Magazine.) At the time of the proposal, Yamaga was 22 years old and had directed the opening anime films for Japan's 1981 and 1983 national science fiction conventions, Daicon III and IV, which through their sale to fans on home video through General Products were themselves regarded as informal precursors of the OVA concept. At age 20 and while still in college, Yamaga had been chosen by the series director of the original Macross TV series, Noboru Ishiguro, to direct episode 9 of the show, "Miss Macross," as Ishiguro wished "to aim for a work that doesn't fit the conventional sense of anime." Yamaga commented in a contemporary Animage article that it had taken him two months to create the storyboards for "Miss Macross" and wryly remarked he had thus already used himself up doing so; the magazine noted however that the episode was well received, and judged the creative experiment a success. (Note: Yamaga had used an old idiomatic expression,「刀折れ矢尽きて」, that refers to reaching the point in battle of having shot one's last arrow, and broken one's sword.)

Okada and Yamaga argued in their proposal for Royal Space Force that what prevented the anime industry from advancing beyond its current level was that it had fallen into a feedback loop with its audience, producing for them a "cul-de-sac" of cute and cool-looking anime content that had the effect of only further reinforcing the more negative and introverted tendencies of many fans, (Note: The word used in the proposal to describe this personality trend was nekura (ネクラ; "gloomy"). A term in popular use within Japan during the 1980s, nekura had connotations that would later be associated with the word otaku. In a 2016 commentary track for the Otaku no Video Blu-ray, Yamaga remarked that the term nekura was in use as far back as his high school days [in the late 1970s]. Gainax producer and publicist Hiroki Sato gave its meaning as "dark root" or "creep," and described it as one of two different Japanese terms to describe hardcore fans that predated the use of otaku. First came mania (マニア; "maniac," "fanatic," "enthusiast") a loan word used in Japanese to refer to the obsessed person, rather than to the obsession as mania would be used in English. Yamaga commented that mania literature often affected a professorial mien and was a word that lent such fans "a sort of air of dignity...It gave the impression of somebody intelligent, a person of multifacted knowledge." Sato remarked that the label nekura rather than mania came into use later, once "things got focused on the negative aspects.") without making a real attempt to connect with them in a more fundamental and personal way:

"In modern society, which is so information-oriented, it becomes more and more difficult even for sensational works to really connect with people, and even so, those works get forgotten quickly. Moreover, this flood of superficial information has dissolved those values and dreams people could stand upon, especially among the young, who are left frustrated and anxious. It could be said that this is the root cause of the Peter Pan syndrome, that says, 'I don't want to be an adult' ... If you look at the psychology of anime fans today, they do interact with society, and they're trying to get along well in that society, but unfortunately, they don't have the ability. So as compensatory behavior, they relinquish themselves to mecha and cute young girls. However, because these are things that don't really exist—meaning, there's no interaction in reality happening between those things and the anime fans—they soon get frustrated, and then seek out the next [anime] that will stimulate them ... If you look into this situation, what these people really want, deep down, is to get along well with reality. And what we propose is to deliver the kind of project that will make people look again at the society around them and reassess it for themselves; where they will think, 'I shouldn't give up yet on reality.'" (Note: In a 2004 essay on Akihabara and the history of otaku culture, professor Kaichiro Morikawa wrote in similar terms: "...as shadows of reality descended upon the 'future' and 'science,' dreams of youth raced off into the realm of fantasy. Objects of fascination veered from science toward science fiction and on to SF anime, whose two leading lights have characteristically been 'robots' and bishōjo 'nymphs.'")

The proposal described Royal Space Force as "a project to make anime fans reaffirm reality". Gainax asserted that the problem was not unique to anime fans, who were only "the most representative example" of the increasing tendency of younger people not to experience reality directly, but as mediated through "the informational world". "We live in a society mired in a perpetual state of information overload. And the feeling of being overwhelmed by the underwhelming isn't something limited to just young people, but everyone" ... "However, this doesn't mean that people want to live alone and without contact, but instead they want to establish a balance with the 'outside' that is psychologically comfortable for them." Yamaga and Okada believed that this sensibility among some fans explained why anime often combined plots that "symbolize modern politics or society" with characters whose age and appearance was "completely incongruent with reality". (Note: The proposal commented several times on what it described as the "pervasive cultural presence" in anime of the lolicon aesthetic; the same Animage article profiling Yamaga's direction of "Miss Macross" had noted that the three alien spies who later infiltrate the space battleship after watching a broadcast of the titular beauty contest were named Warera, Rorii, and Konda, of which the magazine remarked, "Start from the left and keep reading…" i.e., warera lolicon da, meaning in Japanese, "we're lolicon(s)." Animage itself, less than a year before in its April 1982 issue, whose cover story was devoted to the Mobile Suit Gundam III compilation film and which featured the third chapter of Hayao Miyazaki's then-new manga Nausicaä, had given away as a furoku (free gift item), a pack of "Lolicon Cards," playing cards that each featured a different anime girl character, with the exception of the aces, which in all four suits was Clarisse from The Castle of Cagliostro, a favorite heroine of Animage reader polls.) The Royal Space Force plan proposed to use the creative techniques of anime for a radically different aim, to make "the exact opposite of the 'cool,' castle-in-the-sky anime (Note: The phrase esoragoto (絵空事) used in the proposal for "castle-in-the-sky" is different from that used in the title of Hayao Miyazaki's Tenkū no Shiro Laputa (Castle in the Sky), whose production would partially overlap with that of Royal Space Force. Toshio Okada maintained that "during the production stage of [Royal Space Force] Miyazaki would often appear in the dead of night...and talk members of Gainax's crew into leaving to work instead on his own movie.") that is so prevalent these days ... It's on our earth now, in this world of ours now, that we feel it's time for a project that will declare there's still something valuable and meaningful in this world."

One of the "image sketch" paintings by Yoshiyuki Sadamoto and Mahiro Maeda that accompanied the original proposal for Royal Space Force

"It is essential to pay close attention to the smallest design details of this world. It's because it is a completely different world that it must feel like reality. If you ask why such an approach—when the goal is to get anime fans to reaffirm their reality—it's because if you were to set this anime in our actual world to begin with, that's a place which right now they see as grubby and unappealing. By setting it in a completely different world, it becomes like a foreign film that attracts the attention of the audience. The objects of attraction are not mecha and cute girls, but ordinary customs and fashions. If normal things now look impressive and interesting because they've been seen through a different world, then we'll have achieved what we set out to do in the plan; we'll be able to express, 'Reality is much more interesting than you thought.'"

The September 1984 proposal for Royal Space Force was unusual for an anime pitch in that it described the setting and story, but never named the main characters. Okada and Yamaga requested that Maeda and Sadamoto prepare a set of over 30 "image sketches" in watercolor to support the written proposal, depicting the world to be designed for the anime. That same month, Watanabe brought the pitch to Bandai company president Makoto Yamashina, who himself represented a younger corporate generation; Yamashina's response to reading Gainax's proposal was, "I'm not sure what this is all about, but that's exactly why I like it." Yamashina would later state in an interview with the comics and animation criticism magazine Comic Box shortly before the film's release that this viewpoint represented a "grand experiment" by Bandai in producing original content over which they could have complete ownership, and a deliberate strategy that decided to give young artists freedom in creating that content: "I'm in the toy business, and I've always been of the mind that if I understand [the appeal of a product], it won't sell. The reason is the generation gap, which is profound. Honneamise just might hit the jackpot. If so, it will overturn all the assumptions we've had up till now. I didn't want them to make the kind of film that we could understand. Put another way, if it was a hit and I could understand why, it wouldn't be such a big deal. I did want it to be a hit, but from the start, I wasn't aiming for a Star Wars. In trying to make it a success, it had to be purely young people's ideas and concepts; we couldn't force them to compromise. We had to let them run free with it. In the big picture, they couldn't produce this on their own, and that's where we stepped in, and managed to bring it all this way. And in that respect, I believe it was a success."

=== Pilot film ===
Royal Space Force was initially planned as a 40-minute long OVA project; however, resistance within Bandai to entering the filmmaking business resulted in the requirement that Gainax first submit a short "pilot film" version of Royal Space Force as a demo to determine if the project would be saleable. Work on the pilot film began in December 1984; in addition to the principal staff listed in the initial proposal, Mahiro Maeda worked on the pilot's layouts and settei and was one of its key animators together with Sadamoto, Anno, Hiroyuki Kitakubo, Yuji Moriyama, Fumio Iida, and Masayuki. A further addition to the staff was co-producer Hiroaki Inoue, recruited as a founding member of Gainax by Okada. Inoue had already been in the anime industry for several years, beginning at Tezuka Productions. Takeda noted that while a number of the other Royal Space Force personnel had worked on professional anime projects, none possessed Inoue's supervisory experience, or the contacts he had built in the process. Inoue would leave Gainax after their 1988–1989 Gunbuster, but continued in the industry and would later co-produce Satoshi Kon's 1997 debut film Perfect Blue.

The more "Ghiblish" look of Riquinni in the 1985 Royal Space Force pilot film; the character was depicted with an appearance and behavior noticeably different from the actual 1987 movie.

In an effort to get the project green-lit by Bandai's executive board, Shigeru Watanabe of Bandai would show the pilot film to established anime directors Mamoru Oshii and Hayao Miyazaki, both of whom expressed support. In April 1985, Gainax formally presented the finished pilot film to a board meeting at Bandai, together with a new set of concept paintings by Sadamoto. The four-minute pilot film began with a 40-second prelude sequence of still shots of Shirotsugh's early life accompanied by audio in Russian depicting a troubled Soviet space mission, leading into the main portion of the pilot, depicting the story's basic narrative through a progression of animated scenes without dialogue or sound effects, set to the overture of Wagner's Die Meistersinger von Nürnberg.

Okada addressed the board with a speech described as impassioned, speaking for an hour on Gainax's analysis of the anime industry, future market trends, and the desire of the young for "a work called Royal Space Force". Bandai gave interim approval to Royal Space Force as their company's first independent video production; however, the decision to make the project as a theatrical film would be subject to review at the end of 1985, once Gainax had produced a complete storyboard and settei. Yamaga would later acknowledge the pilot film to have been "very Ghiblish," asserting that it had been made by Gainax with a subconscious "consensus" at first to use Hayao Miyazaki's films as a model for success. Yamaga felt that had the actual feature-length version of Royal Space Force been like the pilot, "it would have been easier to grasp and express," yet argued his decision to change course after the pilot film and not attempt to emulate Miyazaki laid the groundwork for Gainax's creative independence that would, in their later works, lead to success on their own terms.

=== Screenplay ===
Following the presentation of the pilot film, Yamaga returned to his hometown of Niigata to begin to write the screenplay and draw up storyboards. Yamaga envisioned the fictional Honnêamise kingdom where most of the events of Royal Space Force took place to have the scientific level of the 1950s combined with the atmosphere of America and Europe in the 1930s, but with characters who moved to a modern rhythm. The inspiration he sought to express in anime from Niigata was not its literal look, but rather a sense of the size and feel of the city and its envrions, including its urban geography; the relationships between its old and new parts, and between its denser core and more open spaces. In August 1985, six members of the crew, Yamaga, Okada, Inoue, Sadamoto, and Anno from Gainax, accompanied by Shigeru Watanabe from Bandai, traveled to the United States for a research trip, studying postmodern architecture, aerospace history, and witnessing a launch of the Space Shuttle Discovery. Documentary footage of the trip was shot by Watanabe and incorporated into a promotional film released two weeks before the Japanese premiere of Royal Space Force. Yamaga made revisions to the script during the American research tour.

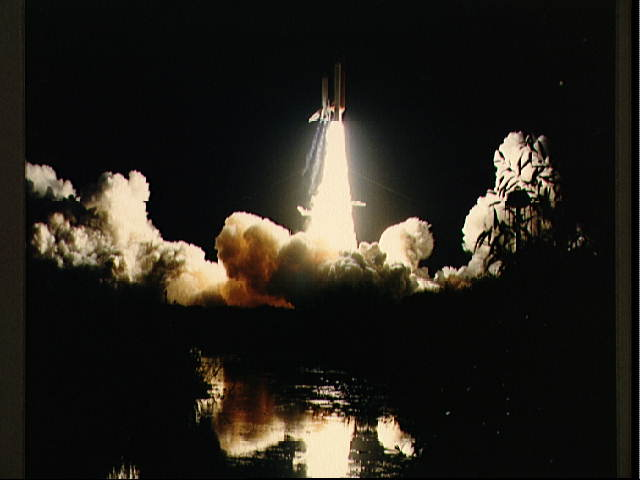
Launch of Space Shuttle Discovery seen by Royal Space Force staff on August 27, 1985. Yamaga spoke of the impression of tremendous light and sound he received from witnessing the event.

Gainax examines the F-1 engines used for the Saturn V rocket on display at the National Air and Space Museum during the August 1985 research trip to the US. From left to right: Hideaki Anno, Yoshiyuki Sadamoto, Toshio Okada, and Hiroaki Inoue. Anno remarked of his work on Royal Space Force: "My aim was to avoid the symbolic approach that has been used in previous animation, and make an effort to retain the impression of what I had actually seen and touched as much as possible...I think what I saw at NASA helped me a lot with the actual film."

Noriaki Ikeda, winner of the 1986 Seiun Award for nonfiction, began a series of articles on the film's production that year for Animage. After watching a rough edit of the film, Ikeda wrote that Royal Space Force was an anime that reminded him of what the works of the American New Wave had achieved in the 1960s; perceiving in the film an effort by Gainax to create a work with their own sense of words and rhythm, employing natural body language, raw expressions, and timing, and an overall "texture" that made a closer approach to human realities. Reviewing the completed film five months later, Ikeda made extensive comment on its use of dialogue, including its nuance as opposed to "the anime we're used to seeing these days, that scream their message at you," spoken lines that were independent of the main narrative, or even lines spoken inaudibly behind a music track, which gave a sense the characters existed as real human beings rather than only as roles to advance a plot.

In a roundtable discussion following the film's theatrical release, Yamaga commented, "I wanted to taste the sense of liberation I could get if I recognized everything [about human nature] and included it," a view with which Okada had concurred, saying, "this is a film that acknowledges people in their every aspect". Yamaga remarked, "A critic once said that none of the characters in this film understand each other. That there's no communication between the characters. He was exactly right. The characters don't understand each other at all. But throughout the film, there are moments where there are glimpses of understandings between [Shirotsugh] and the other characters ... In reality, it's okay not to understand each other. People all live their individual lives—it's not necessary to feel the same way another feels. And in fact you will never understand anybody anyway. This is how I feel about the relationships I have with the people in my life."

Three years after his 1992 departure from Gainax, Okada reflected on the film's screenplay: "Our goal at first was to make a very 'realistic' film. So we couldn't have the kind of strong, dramatic construction you'd find in a Hollywood movie. [Royal Space Force] is an art film. And at the time, I thought that was very good, that this is something—an anime art film. But now when I look back, I realize ... this was a major motion picture. Bandai spent a lot of money on it. It was our big chance. Maybe if I'd given it a little stronger structure, and a little simpler story—change it a little, make it not so different—it could have met the mainstream." "It's true that there will be ten or twenty percent of the audience who can follow it as is, and say, 'Oh, it's a great film! I can understand everything! ' But eighty percent of the audience is thinking, 'I lost Shiro's thoughts two or three times, or maybe four or five.' Those are the kind of people who will say, 'The art is great, and the animation is very good, but the story—mmmm...'" Okada remarked however that the decentralized decision-making creative process at Gainax meant there were limits to how much control could be asserted through the script; Akai would later comment that "the staff were young and curious, not unlike the characters in the film. If you tried to control them too much, they would have just walked out."

Yamaga asserted that a "discrepancy between who [Riquinni] wanted to be and who she really was...is evident in her lifestyle and dialogue," and that "on the outside," she carries an image of Shiro as "'an extraordinary being who travels through space into this peaceful and heavenly place'... But deep down inside she knows the truth. She's not stupid." The director remarked that Riquinni's actions and dialogue in the film's controversial scenes of assault and the morning after reflect the dissonances present in both her self-image and her image of Shiro, and that the scene "was very difficult to explain to the staff" as well; that she is signaling her strength to go on living according to her beliefs, and without Shiro in her life any longer. "There's no simple explanation for that scene, but basically, I was depicting a human situation where two people are moving closer and closer, yet their relationship isn't progressing at all...[Shiro resorts] to violence in an attempt to close that gap, only to find that was also useless. The two of them never came to terms, never understood each other, even to the end of the movie," yet remained "in some way linked together..." however, the film was not intended to depict their relationship as a romantic one.

=== Design ===
In May 1985, Gainax transferred their operations to a larger studio in Takadanobaba, where the existing staff gathered in friends and acquaintances to help visualize the setting of Royal Space Force. Among those joining the crew at this time were two of the film's most prolific world designers: Takashi Watabe, whose designs would include the train station, rocket factory, and Royal Space Force lecture hall and Yoichi Takizawa, whose contributions included the rocket launch gantry, space capsule simulator, and rocket engine test facility. Yamaga decided the alternate world depicted in the pilot film did not have the kind of different realism he was hoping to achieve in the completed work and started over again, creating a new series of "image board" paintings to visualize the look of Royal Space Force. The total worldbuilding process went on for roughly a year, and was described as a converse process between Yamaga and the team of designers; expressing his ideas into concrete terms, but also bringing their concrete skills to bear toward the expression of abstract ideas. This reciprocal process influenced Yamaga's writing on the film: "My style is not 'I have a story I created, so you help me make it.' Creators come first, and this is a story I created thinking what story those creators would shine at the most."

In the decade following Royal Space Force, the Sadamoto-designed Nadia La Arwall and Rei Ayanami would each twice win the Anime Grand Prix fan poll for favorite female character; Sadamoto's Shinji Ikari would also win twice for favorite male character. By contrast, his male and female leads designed for Royal Space Force, Shirotsugh and Riquinni, ranked ninth and twentieth respectively for their categories in the Grand Prix poll of 1987 releases. In a roundtable discussion on the film, it was pointed out that neither Shirotsugh nor Riquinni look like typical anime lead characters. Yamaga remarked that one of the design changes made from the pilot film was Shirotsugh, who "used to look like a boy", but in the full-length movie "has become like a middle-aged man." Sadamoto used for the final version of Shirotsugh a model reference significantly older than the 21-year old character's age, the American actor Treat Williams. For Manna, Yamaga referred Sadamoto to actress Tatum O'Neal as she appeared in the first half of the film Paper Moon. Regarding Riquinni herself, Sadamoto commented that there seemed to be a model for her, but Yamaga did not tell him who it was. In a 2018 interview session with Niigata University, Yamaga remarked, "What I see now is surprisingly the character Riquinni is nothing but me. At any rate, Shirotsugh is not me. If you ask me where I would position myself in the film, I would identify myself as Riquinni in many aspects, in terms of the way I think. I was probably someone weird [and] religious, ever since my childhood."

Still image from a four-second sequence in Royal Space Force demonstrating the film's design emphasis on "ordinary" objects seen through a different world. A weather report glimpsed while the protagonist is channel surfing conveys a simultaneous impression of the Honnêamise kingdom's 1950s technology (black-and-white television using a round cathode-ray tube), its physical layout, and its numeral and writing systems.

On the premise that the real world itself was a product of mixed design, Yamaga believed that the sense of alternate reality in Royal Space Force would be strengthened by inviting as many designers as possible to participate in the anime. By September, the worldbuilding of Royal Space Force proceeded forward by a system where designers were free to draw and submit visual concepts based on their interpretation of Yamaga's script; the concept art would then be discussed at a daily liaison meeting between Yamaga and the other staff. Yamaga used "keywords" given to the designers as a starting point, divided into what he termed "symbolic" and "non-symbolic" categories. The director sought to avoid "symbolic" premises where possible; as an example of the difference, Yamaga stated that a "symbolic" way to describe a "cup" would be to call it a "cylindrical object", whereas he preferred the designers start from "non-symbolic" terms that described a cup's function or sensory impressions from use, such as "it holds water," or "it's cold and sweats when filled with water."

Assistant director Shinji Higuchi had overall responsibility for coordinating the design work with Yamaga's intentions through overseeing the output of the designers. Although his aim was to give a unified look to the kingdom of Honnêamise as the film's main setting, Higuchi also attempted to take care to make it neither too integrated nor too disjointed, remarking that just as the present day world is made from a mixing of different cultures, this would have also been true of a past environment such as the alternate 1950s world of Honnêamise. Yamaga commented that the film also portrayed the idea that different levels of technology are present in a world at the same time depending upon particular paths of development, such as the color TV in use by the Republic, or the air combat between jet and prop planes at the end, which Yamaga compared to similar engagements during the Korean War.

A deliberate exception to Royal Space Force's general design approach was the rocket itself, which was adapted from a real-world Soviet model. This exception was later noticed by Hayao Miyazaki, for whom it formed one of his two criticisms of the anime; he was surprised that a film which had changed even the shape of money did not make the rocket more unusual. Yamaga argued that although the anime reaches its eventual conclusion through a process of different design paths, it was necessary to end the film with a rocket inspired by reality, lest the audience see it as a story about a different world that has nothing to do with them. He described the rocket as also emblematic of the film's approach to mecha; despite its many mecha designs, they all play supporting roles, and even the rocket is not treated as a "lead character".

=== Art direction ===
Although later noted for creating much of the aesthetic behind the influential 1995 film Ghost in the Shell, Hiromasa Ogura in a 2012 interview named his first project as an art director, Royal Space Force, as the top work of his career. Ogura had entered the anime industry in 1977 as a background painter at Kobayashi Production, where he contributed art to such films as Lupin III: The Castle of Cagliostro; at the time work began on Royal Space Force, Ogura was at Studio Fuga, a backgrounds company he had co-founded in 1983. On temporary transfer to Gainax after he was recruited for the project by Okada and Inoue, Ogura recalled he did not at first realize he was working with the same amateur filmmakers who had made the Daicon opening animations. Ogura oversaw a team of 16 background painters on Royal Space Force, including the future art director of Spirited Away, Yōji Takeshige, then still a student attending Tama Art University. A majority of the film's background paintings were created in Gainax's studio rather than outsourced, as Ogura felt the film's worldview was easier for him to communicate to artists in person; as the color scheme in Royal Space Force was subdued; if a painting needed more of a bluish cast to it, he could not simply instruct the artist to "add more blue."

Yamaga and Akai singled out this background painting as marking a turning point in Royal Space Force's art direction. Created for General Khaidenn's office, it appeared 24 minutes into the film, prior to which "we had to be very specific in asking for everything we wanted in the [paintings] ... We weren't communicating with the artists as effectively as we would have liked." However, from this scene forward, they felt the background painters "seemed to grasp what we wanted ... and started coming up with ideas of their own without [needing] specific direction." Ogura had concurred in remarks published in early 1987 that he found it difficult at first to grasp the aesthetic the director intended for the film's world, joking that he would be thinking something looked "cool," but that Yamaga would respond by saying that cool was not precisely what he intended it to be, leaving Ogura to ponder the difference.

Toshio Okada described the aesthetics of the world in which Royal Space Force takes place as having been shaped by three main artists: first, its major color elements (blue and brown) were determined by Sadamoto; then its architectural styles and artistic outlook were designed by [Takashi] Watabe, and finally Ogura gave it "a sense of life" through depicting its light, shadow, and air. It was noted also that the film's world displays different layers of time in its designs; the main motifs being Art Deco, but with older Art Nouveau and newer postmodern elements also present. Ogura commented that although the film depicted a different world, "there's nothing that you'd call sci-fi stuff, it's everyday, normal life like our own surroundings. I wanted to express that messy impression." He laid particular emphasis on attempting to suggest the visual texture of the world's architecture and interior design; following Watabe's detailed notes, Ogura worked to convey in his paintings such aspects as the woodwork motifs prominent in the Space Force headquarters, or by contrast the metallic elements in the room where the Republic minister Nereddon tastes wine. Watabe and Ogura would collaborate again in 1995 on Ghost in the Shell.

Critiquing his own work on Royal Space Force, Ogura expressed a wish that he had been able to convey more emphasis on the effects of light and shadow in addition to color, but joked that it was hard to say exactly how things would turn out until he actually painted them, something he said was true of the entire film. Ogura remarked that many of his team were veterans of Sanrio's theatrical films unit, which gave him confidence in their abilities; mentioning the role of former Sanrio artist, future Gankutsuou art director Hiroshi Sasaki, in the visionary sequence occurring after Shirotsugh's orbiting spacecraft crosses from the world's nightside to its dayside, referred to in production as its "image scene." Akai discusses the involvement as well in this sequence of the future director of Gankutsuou, Mahiro Maeda. Okada judged that the image scene was the only place in the film appropriate to the talent of Maeda, whom he called a "true artist." Anime, Okada argued, was like a reactor that harnessed Maeda, whose artistic talent Okada compared to that of a nuclear blast, for the mundane purpose of boiling water; he asserted that when Maeda had worked before Royal Space Force on Castle in the Sky, not even Hayao Miyazaki had been able to employ his talent properly.

The artist Nobuyuki Ohnishi, a contemporary illustrator whose work Yamaga knew from the music magazines Swing Journal and ADLIB, was picked by Yamaga to create the film's title sequence and closing credits. Yamaga believed using contributions only from artists inside the anime industry set limits on the creative potential of an anime project, and compared Ohnishi's involvement to Ryuichi Sakamoto serving as the film's music director or Leo Morimoto as its lead voice actor. Although his illustrations used a sumi-e ink wash painting technique associated with classical East Asian art, Ohnishi preferred to use the style to depict modern subjects; Yamaga felt the method would convey an alternate perspective and suggest the film's exercise in worldbuilding included a conceptual past and future, rather than a world brought into existence only to tell one particular narrative in time. In creating the credits, Ohnishi made frequent use of photographs of real people and historical events, which he would then modify when adapting it into a painting: "exchanging and replacing the details of, for example, a European picture with Asian or Middle-Eastern elements and motifs. In this way, the credits would reflect both the cultural mixing that gives the film as a whole its appearance, and symbolize the blurring between our world and the film's world, thus serving [Royal Space Force's] function as a 'kaleidoscopic mirror.'"

=== Animation ===
After the completion in December 1985 of Daicon Film's final project, Orochi Strikes Again, its director Takami Akai and special effects director Shinji Higuchi moved to Tokyo to join the production of Royal Space Force as two of its three assistant directors, alongside Shoichi Masuo. At age 20, Higuchi was the very youngest of the main crew; his previous creative experience had been in live-action special effects films rather than anime. As someone who did not "think like an animator," he would bring unorthodox and interesting ideas and techniques to the project. Shoichi Masuo was an associate of Hideaki Anno, whom he had met when the two worked together on the 1984 Macross film. Having more experience than Akai or Higuchi in anime, Masuo would explain Yamaga's abstract directives to animators in concrete terms. Higuchi had overall charge regarding the design aspects of the settei, Masuo was in charge over the color aspects of the settei, including backgrounds, whereas Akai monitored the work as a whole as general assistant to Yamaga. These roles were not fixed, and the three did not confer on a daily basis, but rather would have meetings on how to shift their approach whenever changes in the production situation called for it.

A tank is bombed from above during the climactic battle to capture the launch site, in an explosion animated by the film's special effects artist, Hideaki Anno. Hiroyuki Yamaga and Anno were film students together at the Osaka University of Arts; Anno was the first animator he had ever met, and it was witnessing the "bodily sensation residing" within Anno's explosions that first made Yamaga interested in anime. Even before determining a theme for the project that became Royal Space Force, Yamaga decided the story's climax would feature "Anno's shrapnel".

Masuo remarked that the animation style of Royal Space Force was generally straightforward, without the characteristic quirky techniques to create visual interest or amusement often associated with anime, but that "there's nothing else [in anime] like this where you can do proper acting and realistic mechanical movements. That's why its impression is quite cinematic...In animation, it's very difficult to do something normal. When you consider [the film], there are many scenes where the characters are just drinking tea or walking around. You don't take notice of [such actions], yet they're very difficult to draw, and I think it required a lot of challenging work for the key animators." Anno, who served as the film's special effects artist, likewise remarked that two frequent criticisms of Royal Space Force were that "it could have looked more like a [typical] anime" but also contrariwise that it would have been more appropriate for it to be made in live-action. Anno felt these views failed to apprehend the advantage of using animation for filmmaking as a precise transmission of directorial intent, and the film's aim to convey a sense of reality rather than a look of live-action as such: "All I can say to people who want to see something more anime-like on their screen is that they should watch other anime."

Although Royal Space Force was essentially a pre-digital animated work using layers of physical cels and backgrounds painted by hand, computer-assisted animation was used for certain difficult motion shots, including the contra-rotating propellers of the Honnêamise air force plane, the rotation of the space capsule while in orbit, the tilted wheel turn of the street sweeper, and the swing of the instrument needle in the launch control bunker. The motions themselves were rendered using ASCII 3D software, and then traced onto cels. By contrast, Ryusuke Hikawa noted that the flakes of frost falling from the rocket at liftoff, which might be assumed to be a CG effect, were done entirely by hand under the supervision of Hideaki Anno.

As 1985 drew to a close, Bandai had still not formally committed to Royal Space Force as a feature-length film release, as a distributor for the movie had not yet been secured. Yamaga was also late in finalizing the storyboard, which would not be completed in its entirety until June 1986. However, its third, or C part was nearly finished, and the decision was made to start production there, on the reasoning that the sober tone of many scenes in the third quarter of the film required precision in expression; as there was no release date yet, it was better to work on them while the schedule was still relatively loose. Higuchi remarked that because Yamaga's storyboards were minimalist, containing only the field size, the number of characters in the frame, and the placement of the dialogue, Royal Space Force was not made in a typical fashion for an anime, where the animators would be given directives to "draw this picture." Instead they were asked to "think out the performance in this scene," with meetings where the animators themselves determined how scenes would move by first physically acting them through as if they were attempting to convey it to an audience; the camera angles to be used were also decided through discussion. He described the process in retrospect as having been "a lot of fun," yet noted there were some animators who had refused to work in such a fashion, and backed away from the production.

In January 1986, Toho-Towa agreed to distribute Royal Space Force as a feature film, and production assumed a more frantic pace, as the process of in-betweening, cel painting, and background painting began at this time; additional staff was recruited via advertisements placed in anime magazines. The daily exchange of ideas between Yamaga and the other staff at Gainax continued during production, as the artists attempted to understand his intentions, and Yamaga requested that animation drawings, designs, and background paintings to be re-done in order to get closer to the "image in his head;" the film's artists also exchanged opinions on the images between themselves. Yamaga would later say of the making of Royal Space Force, "it was like we were all swinging swords with our eyes blindfolded". Akai and Yamaga remarked that since they were not "animation purists," they altered the animation drawings, cels, and timesheets in ways that were not traditional industry practice, to the extent that "the young people who followed in our footsteps in creating anime thought that was how it was done," speculating that they may have created new traditions for anime by breaking the old on the production of Royal Space Force.

=== Cinematography ===
As a pre-digital anime, the scenes in Royal Space Force were created by using a camera to photograph the animation cels and backgrounds onto movie film. A scene would typically consist of a series of separate individual shots known as "cuts," with each cut being prepared for the photographer by collecting into a bag all animation cels and background elements to be used in that particular cut. Many of the scenes in the film would be realized through special techniques applied to the underlying animation; an example was the analog television screen in the Space Force barracks, created by photographing the animation cels through a clear acrylic panel cover from a fluorescent lamp. Besides the technical necessity to photograph the animation, Gainax's experience in filming amateur live-action works had an influence on the construction of the animated scenes themselves. Akai and Yamaga remarked that it had not been their intent to "emulate" live-action films, but to make animation with a realism based on their experience of "look(ing) through the camera lens to see what it sees ... It's difficult to express animated films realistically. The camera doesn't really exist." Another reflection of their live-action experience involved building scale models of vehicles and buildings appearing in the film as models for the animators, but also to choose which angles and viewpoints to use in scenes where the modelled objects would appear; in the figurative sense, to "decide where the cameras should be."

The director of photography on Royal Space Force was Hiroshi Isakawa of Mushi Production, where the animation for the pilot film had been shot. Isakawa remarked that he was originally assured photography could begin in April 1986, but received no cuts to film until August, and then "only the easy work," with Gainax putting off more difficult scenes until later. The most intense work period occurred in January 1987, with the filming completed at the end of that month; with the off-and-on nature of the task, the photography had taken three months of actual time. Isakawa described the technical challenges he faced in filming Royal Space Force, with some individual cuts created by using as many as 12 photographic levels consisting of cels, superimposition layers, and sheets of paper masks designed to capture isolated areas of different colored light. Another challenging aspect involved motion, such as conveying the heavy vibrations of Marty's motorcycle, or the air force plane cockpit; whereas ordinarily such scenes would be filmed while shaking the cels and the backgrounds as a unit, Gainax insisted that the elements be shaken separately.

Yamaga and Shinji Higuchi, who also served as assistant director of photography on the film, had Isakawa watch The Right Stuff and showed him NASA photos as a reference for the look they wished to achieve in certain shots. To convey a sense of the visual mystery of the film's world from space, Isakawa photographed the art through masks with such tiny holes that he felt the images were hardly lit at all; he was unable to judge the light levels in advance, having to make adjustments afterwards based on examining the developed film. Isakawa mentioned that he would get tired and angry after being asked to shoot five or six different takes of a cut, not seeing the necessity for it, but gave up resisting when he realized it was a work "in pursuit of perfection," and felt that the final achievement was "realistic without using the imagery of live action, a work that made full use of anime's best merits."

== Voice acting ==
The voice performances in Royal Space Force were supervised by Atsumi Tashiro of the anime studio Group TAC, who had been sound director for the highly influential 1974 TV series Space Battleship Yamato. Gainax had been enthusiastic in pursuing Tashiro's involvement, even though Tashiro had not worked outside his own company in over 20 years, sending him the film's script, followed by a personal visit from Yamaga and Okada. Despite his initial difficulty in grasping the project, Tashiro was struck by the passion and youth of the filmmakers, and felt that working with them on Royal Space Force would represent an opportunity to "revitalize" himself professionally.

Yamaga remarked that he "wanted the dialogue to be natural," which he maintained was "a first in Japanese animation." Akai felt a tone had been set for Royal Space Force by the decision to cast Leo Morimoto in the lead role as Shirotsugh: "The other actors [then] knew that this was going to be a different kind of animated film." Morimoto was a 43-year old veteran actor of live-action films and TV but had very limited experience in anime, whereas Mitsuki Yayoi, cast as Riquinni after Gainax had heard her on the radio, was a stage actor and member of the Seinenza Theater Company with some voice-over experience, but who had never before played an anime role. Tashiro saw the casting as a great opportunity for him, asserting that the apprehension Morimoto and Yayoi felt due to their mutual unfamiliarity with the field meant that they approached their roles as an actual encounter, with genuine emotion and reactions that were honest and fresh, a spirit that Tashiro said he had forgotten within the world of anime.

Morimoto remarked during a recording session for the film in late November 1986 that Tashiro directed him not to play the role of Shirotsugh as if it were an anime, but rather to attempt the flavor of a live performance, and that Yamaga had given him the same instructions. He commented that it was a difficult role for him, as unlike a live-action drama, "you can't fake the mood, you have to express yourself correctly with just your voice," and viewed his work on Royal Space Force as "scary" but "fulfilling." Although evaluating the character himself as "not a great hero," at the same time he found much that was convincing in Shirotsugh's growth, feeling that it somehow came to assume the role of history's own progression: "What is to be found at the end of that maturation is gradually revealed, arriving at a magnificent place." He added he was "shocked that a 24-year old could make such a film ... I'm glad to know that [creators] like this are making their debut, and I hope that more of them do."

Yayoi commented that Yamaga had described Riquinni to her as "uncompromising in her beliefs, and this could be seen as hardheadedness and causing problems or discomfort to those around her. But also that she could look upon something truly beautiful, yet not respond simply by thinking that yes, it is beautiful, but might ponder it, and wonder if it genuinely is. It's not a disability or a deliberate obstacle [in her character], but just that people around her would honestly think that this girl is a little bit weird." Yayoi understood Riquinni as a "normal girl" who, to the extent she was out of step with everyday life, was not so much because she was strange on the inside, but because her relationships with the exterior world were governed by her strong will; Yayoi suggested that the film is her coming-of-age story as well.

== Music ==
In April 1986, Ryuichi Sakamoto was selected as the musical director of Royal Space Force. Sakamoto was already regarded for his work in the pioneering electronic band Yellow Magic Orchestra and his soundtrack for the 1983 Nagisa Oshima film Merry Christmas, Mr. Lawrence; the year following the release of Royal Space Force, Sakamoto would share the Academy Award for Best Original Score for the soundtrack to The Last Emperor. In 1986 Sakamoto was prominent also in the Japanese domestic film market for his soundtrack to its top-grossing movie of that year, Koneko Monogatari. Ryusuke Hikawa commented that in fact the musical director was the only member of Royal Space Force's main staff known to the general public at the time of the film's production; Yamaga recalled that asking Sakamoto to do the music for Royal Space Force required a special increase of 40 million yen above its previous 360 million yen budget. Sakamoto's first commercial release of music for the project occurred three months before the Japanese debut of the film itself, in the form of a 12" maxi single entitled The Wings of Honnêamise: Image Sketch, containing early mixes of four key initial pieces he had composed for the film's soundtrack, referred to on Image Sketch only under the names "Prototype A", "Prototype B", "Prototype C", and "Prototype D". In its liner notes Sakamoto commented that one of the main reasons he accepted the job was that he saw a resemblance between the meticulous care he put into his music and the efforts the filmmakers were taking with Royal Space Force. Yamaga wrote in Image Sketch that he saw Sakamoto as a composer who, like the other creators working on the film, rejected "fill-in-the-blank" styles and instead expressed a deep personal sensibility.

Sakamoto brought into the Royal Space Force project his prior collaborators on Koneko Monogatari, musicians Koji Ueno, Yuji Nomi, and Haruo Kubota. Ueno, Kubota, and Nomi took as their starting points Sakamoto's four prototypes as well as a set of "keywords" that Yamaga had given them for guidance. The team worked from a "chart table" prepared by Sakamoto and sound director Atsumi Tashiro listing each scene in the film requiring music, with notes on length, the kind of music to be used, and which of the four prototypes to use as a basis for their arrangements. Ueno, Kubota, and Nomi then decided which scenes in the film they would each arrange, and then made their pieces separately, neither working on them in the studio together, or with Sakamoto. After arranging a piece, they would reassemble as a group and listen to each other's work, and then go their separate ways once again to continue the process. 47 musical arrangements were made for the film based on the chart, of which 15 were later selected to be featured on The Wings of Honnêamise~Royal Space Force Original Soundtrack album released in March 1987, most were developed as variations on one of Sakamoto's original four prototypes; for example, "Prototype A" would become the basis of the film's opening credits theme. A few were created based on arrangements combining two of the four prototypes; 13 of the 47 pieces, however, were not based on any of the four, but were instead new original compositions created later in the soundtrack process by Ueno, Kubota, Nomi, or Sakamoto himself; several of these were featured on the Original Soundtrack. The background music pieces not included on the Original Soundtrack would eventually be collected as a bonus feature on the 1990 Royal Space Force~The Wings of Honnêamise Memorial Box LaserDisc edition; this bonus feature would also be included as an extra on the 2000 Manga Entertainment DVD.

Toshio Okada remarked in 1995, "I didn't really like Sakamoto's [musical] style back then, or even now. But I know his talent, his ability to construct a strong score, and write an entire orchestration. That's why I chose him," stating that "at that time, he was the only choice for an original movie soundtrack." Asked if he had considered Joe Hisaishi, Okada replied, "Hisaishi always writes one or two melodies, and the rest of the soundtrack is constructed around them ... But his kind of style wouldn't have worked for [Royal Space Force] ... for better or worse, the film has a very differentiated structure, and we needed a score to match that." In 2018, Sakamoto's film score for My Tyrano: Together, Forever was reported by media outlets as his first time composing for animation. The composer remarked in an interview earlier that year that he had been in charge of the music for an anime film "35 [sic] years ago, but I didn't like it very much (so I can't say the title)." Commenting on Sakamoto's remarks, Okada recalled that the composer had been sincerely excited about creating the music for Royal Space Force early on in the project, and had studied its storyboards closely for inspiration; the liner notes for the 1987 Original Soundtrack album noted a music planning meeting where the enthusiasm was so great participants ended up staying for 12 hours. Okada theorized Sakamoto may have seen the exactly timed scenes as a chance to achieve a perfect sync between his music and the images; however, Okada noted, the actual length of a finished cut of animation may vary slightly, and ultimately the sound director has the prerogative to edit the music accordingly. Okada believed such issues could have been resolved if he had the opportunity to speak directly with Sakamoto and make adjustments, but after a point communications became relayed through his management, Yoroshita Music. The composer himself had been away from Japan during the final months of Royal Space Force's production, which overlapped with the shooting schedule of The Last Emperor. Okada asserted that although Sakamoto and Yamaga themselves never came into conflict, the situation led to frustration among the film's staff, and in particular between Yoroshita and sound director Tashiro; Tashiro eventually asked Okada to make the call as to whether he or Sakamoto would have final say on placing the music. Okada chose Tashiro, remarking that he accepted responsibility for the decision although he believed it was what soured Sakamoto on Royal Space Force, to the extent of not discussing it as part of his history as a film composer.

== Marketing and release ==
=== Marketing ===
By late 1986, signs of nervousness had appeared among sponsors and investors in the film, as "the footage of Royal Space Force neared completion … and was found to be inconveniently free of many merchandising spin-off opportunities," prompting what Jonathan Clements describes as "outrageous attempts" by its financial backers to "fix" the film that began with "prolonged arguments over a sudden perceived need to rename it." The project had been pitched, developed, and approved for production under the name Royal Space Force; Okada remarked that, to Gainax, it was "its one and only title". All Nippon Airways, one of the film's sponsors, however desired that the title include the word "wings", while Bandai favored that the title should use the form "Something of Something," on the reasoning that the last big anime hit had been called Nausicaä of the Valley of the Wind. As Royal Space Force "was 'not sexy enough'" and Riquinni was "conveniently female," the initial push was to use the title (The) Wings of Riquinni.

Although the plan to make Royal Space Force had been known around the anime industry since mid-1985, the official announcement of the film was not made until June 4, 1986, in a press conference held at the prestigious Imperial Hotel in Tokyo. The announcement used Royal Space Force as the main title of the film, with (The) Wings of Riquinni as a smaller subtitle; privately, Yamaga objected strongly to the subtitle, pointing out the purpose of the film was to expand the audience's view of the world, and that he did not want a title that focused on one character; therefore, if a second title was absolutely required, he suggested it use Honnêamise after the name of the kingdom in which most of the film's events takes place. As 1986 drew to a close, publicity for the film gradually relegated Royal Space Force to the status of a smaller subtitle beneath The Wings of Honnêamise.

In a 2010 memoir, Okada reflected that the conflict had involved not only the film's title, but also its length. Okada acknowledged a shorter movie could have potentially increased ticket sales by allowing the film to be shown more times per day; at the time, however, Okada had refused, arguing that the box office was not part of his job, saying in a meeting that if they wanted to cut the film by even 20 minutes, they might as well cut off Okada's arm. In retrospect, Okada felt that he had acted like a child, but that "creators are all children." Bandai company president Makoto Yamashina affirmed shortly before the film's release that during a three week period he and distributor Toho-Towa had thought of cutting 20 minutes from the film: "but the process of deciding what [scenes] to cut began with conversations about why they shouldn't be cut. And afterwards, I thought, 'Ah, I get it now' and felt that I couldn't ... For the sake of the box office, it could have worked at around 100 minutes, but if we cut the film at this stage, the whole objective of the movie flies out the window, and the hundreds of millions of yen spent on it have no meaning." Yamashina told Toho he would accept responsibility if his decision meant the film was not a hit.

Okada wrote of having later heard how "emotions were running high" on the Bandai side as well, to the extent of considering taking the project away from Gainax and giving it to another studio to finish, or even cancelling the film's release, despite the 360 million yen already spent on producing it. However, this would have required someone's "head to roll" at Bandai to take responsibility for the loss, which could mean Makoto Yamashina himself, who had announced Royal Space Force as his personal project durung the official press conference in June. Okada noted that the person caught in the middle was Shigeru Watanabe, who had supported the project from the beginning but now found himself "forced into a very difficult position," becoming so depressed by the conflict that following the film's release, he took a year's leave of absence. Okada expressed great regret for what he described as his lack of kindness at the time toward Watanabe, but nevertheless did not regret his lack of compromise, believing that if he had given any ground, the film might have not been completed.

In one of the trailers made to promote the film, the standing stone seen briefly in the movie was presented as having an iconic and supernatural role in the film's plot. In the marketing push to position the film as reminiscent of Nausicaä, giveaway posters were placed in Animage, which was still serializing the Nausicaä manga at the time.

Okada asserted in a 1995 interview that as Nausicaä had been "the last 'big anime hit,'" the marketing staff at Toho-Towa modeled their thinking upon it, and after realizing the film was not going to be like Nausicaä, decided to advertise it as if it was. Yamashina had himself acknowledged that the film's sales target was based on Nausicaä even though "the content of this work isn't like Nausicaä ... No one's ever done something like this before, so it's a great risk in that respect." In 2000, Akai recalled, "The PR department didn't really seem to understand the film. They have a tendency to make a new release interesting by making it appear similar to a film that was previously a hit." Yamaga commented, "There was no precedent in advertising a film like ours at the time ... they can only compare it to something like Nausicaä. It's actually completely different." Yamaga however felt that Nausicaä "at least served as a reference when we were asked to describe our film. If it wasn't for that precedent, there would have been no reference point at all." Clements remarked, "the promotions unit did everything in their power to make Honnêamise appeal to precisely the same audience as Nausicaä, even if that meant misleading advertising," citing an "insect incident" where Yoshiyuki Sadamoto was asked to draw an image of Manna's pet bug as if it were a giant creature attacking the city in the film, in the manner of the giant ohmu in Nausicaä.

The national publicity campaign for the film now being promoted under the title The Wings of Honnêamise~Royal Space Force began on New Year's Day, 1987, including full-color newspaper and magazine ads, as well as TV commercials, with eventual placements in over 70 media outlets. As with the "insect incident," a frequent aspect of the marketing push involved taking images from the film and presenting them as fantastical, such as a steam train from the movie relabeled as a "bio-train" in ads. The film's official press kit described its story premise as: "'... Through the guidance of a lass with a pure and untainted soul, those who are awakened shall take wing and rise to Heaven, taking in hand the Honnêamise holy book' ... Shirotsugh grew up to join the Royal Space Force, as did other youths as hot blooded and energetic as he. It was then that work began on a grand project to search space for the envisioned holy book that promises eternal peace to Honnêamise." The standing stone seen briefly in the story, while given no particular meaning in the film itself, was repurposed into a major feature of the film's advertising, labeled as a "Symbol Tower" that shines due to what ads described as a secret telepathic link born from the "passionate love" between Shirotsugh and Riquinni. The only dialogue spoken in the trailer, "Do you believe in the miracle of love?" said by Riquinni's voice actor, Mitsuki Yayoi, was not a line from the actual film, but referenced a catchphrase used in the advertising campaign.

=== Release ===
==== Japanese release ====
Shortly before the release of the film, Makoto Yamashina stated his considerable uncertainty over how the film would be received, with the fear that "the theaters will be deserted." He also however expressed anxiety over the implications for the industry if it succeeded: "If it turns out that young people today are thinking along Yamaga's lines, at that level of sophistication, it's going to be very difficult [for other filmmakers] ... It's hard for me to talk about the film like this, but regardless of whether or not it succeeds, it's a movie that I don't understand." In an attempt to build publicity for the film's March 1987 release in Japan, a world premiere event was held on February 19, 1987, at Mann's Chinese Theatre in Hollywood. The one-night showing was arranged for the Japanese media, with all Tokyo TV news shows covering the premiere; Bandai paid for 200 anime industry notables to attend as well. Footage from the Hollywood event was incorporated into a half-hour promotional special that aired March 8 on Nippon TV, six days before the film's release in Japan. Americans invited to the showing included anime fans and several figures associated with U.S. science fiction cinema including The Terminator and Aliens actor Michael Biehn, as well as Blade Runner designer Syd Mead. Although referred to in Japanese publicity materials as The Wings of Honnêamise~Royal Space Force's "American prescreening," the film was shown under the name Star Quest, and presented in an English dub remarked upon by both U.S. and Japanese anime magazines covering the event for its significant differences from the original film; in 2021 Bandai's Ken Iyadomi recalled, "it was localized in a totally American way, and everyone hated it."

The Wings of Honnêamise~Royal Space Force was released nationwide in Japan on March 14, 1987. In a late spring discussion following the film's release, co-producer Hiroaki Inoue asserted that the film "put up a good fight," arguing that the average theater stay for original anime films was four weeks; in one theater, Royal Space Force had managed a seven-week engagement. Takeda recalled, "Not a single theater cancelled its run, and in some locations, it actually had a longer run than initially planned ... The budget scale meant that reclaiming all the production costs (Note: Okada remarked that of the 800 million yen budget for the film, 360 million had been spent on the direct production costs; the remainder was for indirect costs including advertising (senden) expenses and distribution costs (kōgyō, "entertainment," a term here referring to booking advance blocs of screening dates for the film in theaters).) at the box office simply wasn't feasible." Clements however presents an argument that the film was overinvested in as part of the "goldrush tensions" of Japan's bubble economy, and that the original plan to release it as an OVA might have been more financially sensible. Beginning with its 1990 Japanese laserdisc box set release, the film's main title was changed back to Royal Space Force, with The Wings of Honnêamise as a smaller subtitle. Although Gainax itself was nearly bankrupted by the project, Bandai recouped its investment in September 1994, seven and a half years after its Japanese theatrical release; the film has continued to generate profit for them since. (Note: In an interview conducted in April 2003 (published in 2005), Yasuhiro Takeda remarked that when Gainax was planning Royal Space Force, there were people who asked whether they intended to secure rights in the work, but at the time it was more of a priority for Gainax to get the film made the way they wanted to than to insist on rights. Although Yamaga did retain the right to supervise the film, and Gainax was credited by Bandai for making it, Royal Space Force was financed through Bandai, to whom the contract gave 100% of the copyright; Takeda commented, "Contractually, [Royal Space Force] is not 'our thing.'")

==== English-language release ====
An English-subtitled 16 mm film version of the film authorized by Bandai screened at the 1988 Worldcon; a contemporary report linked it to a possible home video version in the United States. However, it was not until 1994 that the film received an actual commercial English-language release, when a new English dub, using its original Japanese theatrical release title The Wings of Honnêamise: Royal Space Force was recorded at Animaze and released by Manga Entertainment. The new English dub showed in over 20 movie theaters during 1994–95 as a 35 mm film version and was subsequently released in both dubbed and subtitled form on VHS and LaserDisc. Animerica, in a contemporary review, assessed the dub as "admirable in many respects," but argued that changes to the dialogue meant the subtitled version represents "a clearer presentation of the original ideas and personalities created by Hiroyuki Yamaga." In a later interview however, Yamaga, while confirming he had not approved the dub script beforehand, was more ambivalent, stating that he himself had enjoyed foreign films whose translations had been changed: "What I think is that everyone has their own areas of tolerance as you shift from the original work ... It comes down to what you're willing to accept."

The 2000 release by Manga Entertainment on DVD, although praised for its commentary track with Hiroyuki Yamaga and Takami Akai, was at the same time severely criticized for its poor visual quality. In 2007, Bandai Visual released a Blu-ray/HD DVD version to mark the film's 20th anniversary; this release used the audio of the 1997 Japanese edition of the film in which its sound effects were re-recorded in Dolby 5.1. Although containing a 20-page booklet with essays by Hiroyuki Yamaga and Ryusuke Hikawa, it lacks the commentary track of the 2000 Manga DVD release, and is now out of print. Maiden Japan re-released the movie separately on Blu-ray and DVD in 2013. In August 2022, Section23 Films announced a concurrent home video release with Bandai Namco Filmworks of a 4K remaster of the film supervised by director Hiroyuki Yamaga, containing as extras the 1987 Japanese production documentary Oneamisu no Tsubasa: Ōritsu Uchūgun—Document File, a version of the pilot film with an alternate audio track, and a collection of the film's background music. The film's initial release in the United Kingdom on VHS in 1995 by Manga Entertainment was cut to remove the attempted rape scene; in a contemporary interview, BBFC examiner Imtiaz Karim indicated this was done voluntarily by Manga, so that the film, which had been certified for audiences 15 and up when shown in UK theaters, could receive the lower PG certificate when released on home video. The 2015 Blu-ray and DVD UK edition of the film from Anime Limited was released uncut with a 15 certificate.

== Reception ==
=== Critical response in Japan ===
The Yomiuri Shimbun, Japan's largest daily newspaper, published a mixed review of the film the day before its Japanese premiere, characterizing the film as scattered and boring at times, and stating a certain "resentment at its lack of excitement," but concluded by expressing its admiration for the film on the grounds of its effort and expense, honest and personal vision, and for not clinging to the patterns of previous anime works. A contemporary review in Kinema Junpo, Japan's oldest film journal, saw the film as not truly about the "well-worn subject" of space travel, but rather about reaching a point where "the whole Earth can be seen ... taking full advantage of the unique medium of animation," the creators "observe civilization objectively first and then disassemble it to eventually restructure it ... Stories that feature cool machines, robots, and attractive characters, with the plot unfolding while drifting through space, already reached their peak in a sense with the [1984] Macross movie. Rather than trying to go beyond Macross, I think the creators of this film believed that they could find a new horizon for anime by creating a different world in a way that draws the story closer to Earth again."

Royal Space Force ranked high in major annual retrospectives awarded by the Japanese anime press. The film won the Japan Anime Award for best anime release of 1987, while making two of the top ten lists in the Anime Grand Prix fan poll, as #4 anime release of the year, with Shirotsugh Lhadatt as #9 male character. In 1988, Royal Space Force won the Seiun Award, Japan's oldest prize for science fiction, for Best Dramatic Presentation of the previous year. At the beginning of 1989, an Animage retrospective on the first 70 years of anime film compared Royal Space Force to Isao Takahata's 1968 directorial debut The Great Adventure of Horus, Prince of the Sun as a work that, like Horus, seemed to have emerged onto the scene unrelated to any previous commercial release: "an anime movie with a different methodology and message ... It's uncertain what influence it will have on anime in the future, but what is certain is that this was a work filled with the tremendous passion of its young staff."

Hayao Miyazaki praised Royal Space Force, calling it "an honest work, without any bluff or pretension ... I thought the movie is going to be a great inspiration to the young people working in this industry. They may be intensely divided over whether they like it or not, but either way it's going to serve as a stimulus." Miyazaki expressed two criticisms of the film: the design of the rocket, which he saw as too conventional and reminiscent of "big science like NASA," and the fact Shirotsugh was positioned as having to rally the older members of the Space Force into not giving up on the launch, which Miyazaki found unconvincing given that they had dreamed of space travel far longer than he. Yamaga did not deny that he wrote the script in a way he thought would appeal to young people, but felt it very important to note the contributions of the older and younger generation to both the launch of the rocket, and to the making of the film itself. Miyazaki felt that since it was young people like Yamaga who had "actively sown the seeds of improvement [in anime]" with Royal Space Force, it would have been better in the movie if the young told the old, "'Stand back, old men.'" Yamaga remarked in response that the film showed a reality where neither generation of the Space Force saw their personal visions prevail, as the construction of the rocket and its launch only happened because of support from a government that had a different agenda from their own. "It's not about making a leap, even though from the beginning it seems that way. More than going somewhere new in a physical sense, my aim was to show something worthy in the process."

In a 1996 interview shortly after the original broadcast of Neon Genesis Evangelion, Hideaki Anno traced his preceding period of despair and sense of creative stagnation back to the commercial failure of Royal Space Force, which had "devastated" him, asserting that his own directorial debut, Gunbuster, was an ironic response to the reception Royal Space Force had received: "Right, so [instead] send into space a robot and a half-naked girl." Three years earlier Mamoru Oshii had expressed the view that Anno had not yet made an anime that was truly his own as a creator, whereas he believed Yamaga had already done so on Royal Space Force. Oshii felt it therefore necessarily revealed all of Yamaga's shortcomings as well, and that he "had a lot of problems" with the movie, but nevertheless felt that Royal Space Force had a certain impact on the idea of making an anime film, simply because no one had ever made one like it before: "It's the kind of work that I want to see." Oshii admired most the film's "rejection of drama." " ... The more I saw it, the more I only realized that Yamaga was a man who had no intention of making drama. And I thought that was a very good thing." Oshii asserted it was not necessary for films to be based in a dramatic structure, but that they could instead be used to create a world filled with mood and ideas.

=== Critical response internationally ===
Critical response to the English-dubbed version of the film during its 1994–1995 theatrical release was greatly divided, with reviews differing widely on the film's plot, themes, direction, and designs. The San Jose Mercury News gave a one-star review, writing that the film was misogynistic, lacked originality, conflict, and resolution; also perceiving in its character designs "self-loathing stereotypes" of Japanese people, a view advanced as well in a negative review of the film by LA Village View. The Salt Lake Tribune described it as "plodding" and "a dull piece of Japanese animation ... The filmmakers create precisely drawn images, but there's no life or passion behind them." The Dallas Morning News felt that Hiroyuki Yamaga's "trying to appeal to a broader audience" was by itself a fundamentally mistaken approach to making anime, comparing it to trying to "commercialize punk music"; the review instead recommended that audiences see "a far more representative anime, Fist of the North Star ... Fist has few of the pretensions of Wings and it's driven along with an energy its better-dressed cousin never attains."

More favorable reviews tended to regard the film as unconventional while nevertheless recommending the film to audiences. The Fort Worth Star-Telegram wrote it "blends provocative ideas and visual beauty", comparing its worldbuilding to that of Blade Runner. LA Weekly commented, "These strange, outsize pieces fuse and add a feeling of depth that cartoon narratives often don't obtain ... Technical brilliance aside, what gives [the film] its slow-building power is the love story—a mysterious and credible one." The Washington Post viewed its two-hour length as "a bit windy" but also asserted, "Hiroyuki Yamaga's The Wings of Honnêamise is a spectacular example of Japanimation, ambitious and daring in its seamless melding of color, depth and detail." Roger Ebert of the Chicago Sun-Times gave the film three stars out of four, praising Yamaga's visual imagination and remarked on the director's "offbeat dramatic style," recommending "If you're curious about anime, The Wings of Honnêamise ... is a good place to start." In the United Kingdom, The Guardian regarded it as the standout of an anime festival at London's National Film Theatre: "One film in the season, though, proves that anime can be complex and lyrical as well as exciting. Hiroyuki Yamaga's Wings of Honnêamise ... " In Australia, Max Autohead of Hyper magazine rated it 10 out of 10, calling it "a cinematic masterpiece that will pave the way for more" anime of its kind.

Following its initial English-language release in the mid-'90s, later retrospectives on anime have had a positive view of Royal Space Force: The Wings of Honnêamise. In a 1999 issue of Time, former Film Comment editor-in-chief Richard Corliss wrote an outline on the history of anime, listing under the year 1987 the remark, "The Wings of Honnêamise is released, making anime officially an art form." In the 2006 edition of The Anime Encyclopedia, Jonathan Clements and Helen McCarthy characterized the film as "one of the shining examples of how cerebral and intelligent anime can be". Simon Richmond, in 2009's The Rough Guide to Anime, wrote that the film's "reputation has grown over time to the point where it is justly heralded as a classic of the medium". whereas in 2014's Anime, Colin Odell and Michelle Le Blanc described the film as "an example of science-fantasy anime as art-film narrative, combined with a coming-of-age drama that is intelligent and thought-provoking". Jason DeMarco, current senior vice president at Warner Discovery and co-creator of Toonami, ranked it as the #11 anime movie of all time, stating "If The Wings of Honnêamise is a 'noble failure,' it's the sort of failure many filmmakers would kill to have on their résumé." During a 2021 interview with the New York Times, science fiction author Ted Chiang, whose Nebula Award-winning "Story of Your Life" was the basis for the Denis Villeneuve movie Arrival, cited Royal Space Force as the single most impressive example of worldbuilding in book or film. On the review aggregator website Rotten Tomatoes, 100% of 8 critics' reviews are positive, with an average rating of 6.9/10.

== Academic analysis ==
Royal Space Force attracted a broader academic analysis as early as 1992, when Takashi Murakami referenced the film through Sea Breeze, an installation created during his doctoral studies in nihonga at Tokyo University of the Arts. The installation piece was described as "a ring of enormous, 1000-watt mercury spotlights that emitted a powerful blast of heat and blinding light when a roller shutter was raised ... the circular of lights was based on a close-up of rocket engines firing during a space launch in the anime Royal Space Force: [The] Wings of Honneamise." Hiroyuki Yamaga's remark, "We wanted to create a world, and we wanted to look at it from space" would be quoted as an epigram in My Reality—Contemporary Art and the Culture of Japanese Animation, where Murakami was described as a "pivotal figure" among contemporary artists "inundated with manga and anime—and with concepts of the new Japan, which was wrestling with a sense of self-identity as an increasingly strong part of the modern capitalistic world, yet was tied to a long and distinguished past." In a discussion with the Japanese arts magazine Bijutsu Techō, Murakami "... found it commendable that otaku were dedicated to 'the invention of a new technique, especially through the use of overlooked elements, finding an "empty space".' He maintained that art must find the same 'empty space' to revolutionize itself." "Gainax represented, for Murakami, a model of marginalized yet cutting-edge cultural production ... At the same time, the fact that the burning wheel was contained inside a box signified passion confined within a conventional frame, evoking the failure of Honneamise to present a uniquely Japanese expression as it remained under the influence of Western science-fiction films."

Murakami would express a specific historical conception of otaku during a discussion with Toshio Okada conducted for the 2005 exhibition Little Boy: The Arts of Japan's Exploding Subculture: "After Japan experienced defeat in World War II, it gave birth to a distinctive phenomenon, which has gradually degenerated into a uniquely Japanese culture ... [you] are at the very center of this otaku culture", further asserting in an essay for the exhibit catalog that therefore "otaku ... all are ultimately defined by their relentless references to a humiliated self". This historical positioning of otaku culture would itself be challenged through an analysis of Royal Space Force by Viktor Eikman, who cites Murakami's statement that the studio that made the film occupied "a central place in the current anime world... [they were] professionally incorporated as Gainax in 1984 upon production of the feature-length anime The Wings of Honneamise (released in 1987)" but that the two Gainax works discussed by Murakami in his theory of otaku were the Daicon IV Opening Animation and Neon Genesis Evangelion. Eikman argues that the theory should be tested also against "other works by the same studio, made by the same people for the same audience, but not analysed [in the essay] by Murakami". Of Royal Space Force, Eikman contended, "At most we may view the humiliated Shiro's mission as symbolic of Japan's desire to join the Space Race in particular and the 'big boy' struggles of the Cold War in general, a desire which plays into the sense of childish impotence described by Murakami, but even that is a very speculative hypothesis," arguing that "it is remarkably hard to find parallels to World War II" in the film.

In 2004's The Cinema Effect, examining film through "the question of temporality", Sean Cubitt presents an argument grouping Royal Space Force together with 1942: A Love Story and Once Upon a Time in China as examples of "revisionary" films that "displace the fate of the present, opening instead a vista onto an elsewhere...ready to forsake the Western ideal of realism [for] the possibility of understanding how they might remake the past and so make the present other than it is." Cubitt, like Murakami, references the historical consequences of World War II, but in citing a speech by Japan's first postwar prime minister on the need for "nationwide collective repentance," suggests that such repentance is "the theme that seems to resonate in the curious, slow budding" of Royal Space Force through Riquinni's "homemade religion of renunciation and impending judgment" arguing that such a philosophy is evoked also through the film's animation style: "Like the zero of the Lumières' flickering views, the action of [Royal Space Force] sums at nothingness, a zero degree of the political that removes its resolution from history ... into the atemporal zone denoted by Shirotsugh's orbit ... an empty place from which alone the strife of warfare and suffering sinks into pure regret, not so much an end as an exit from history."

In contrast, Shu Kuge, in a 2007 essay in the journal Mechademia, sees Shiro's position in space at film's end as "not the denial of history but the empathetic move to accept the cruel world without translating it into a metaphysical meaning". Kuge groups the connection between Shiro and Riquinni with Makoto Shinkai's Voices of a Distant Star as examples of a personal connection that is in either case a relationship sustained by the spatial distance between two people: "[they] sustain the distance rather than shrink it because sustaining ... is crucial for their relationships to be vast and generous. The topological relationship between the floating and the remaining is actually a mimesis of a stellar relationship, such as the moon and the earth, the earth and the sun." Noting the struggle between the armed forces of Honnêamise and the Republic to control the same territory, Kuge comments that by contrast the Royal Space Force does not in fact "possess any military force," and suggests that likewise the personal nature of Shiro and Riquinni's relationship depends upon respecting the physical separation and boundaries that she seeks to maintain and which he seeks to violate, and does violate, before they are reaffirmed in the latter part of the film.

== Sequel ==
During 1992–93, Gainax developed plans for a sequel to Royal Space Force to be entitled Aoki Uru (also known under the titles Uru in Blue and Blue Uru); an anime film project to be directed by Hideaki Anno and scripted by Hiroyuki Yamaga, with Yoshiyuki Sadamoto serving as its chief animation director and character designer. Although a full storyboard, partial script, and an extensive collection of design illustrations were produced for Aoki Uru, the project had been initiated without a secured budget, and its development occurred within a period of personal, financial, and managerial crises at Gainax that contributed to the indefinite suspension of work on Aoki Uru in July 1993; the studio instead shifted to producing as their next anime project the TV series Neon Genesis Evangelion. In the years following 1993, Gainax has made occasional announcements regarding a revival of the Aoki Uru concept, including a multimedia proposal in the late 1990s, and the formal announcement of an English name for the film, Uru in Blue, at the 2013 Tokyo Anime Fair. In 2018, the Uru in Blue project was transferred from Gainax to Gaina, a different corporate entity and subsidiary of the Kinoshita Group, which aimed for a worldwide release of the film in 2022. However, in an essay about civilization made by Yamaga in the December 22, 2022, issue of Niigata Keizai Shimbun, it was stated that he was still "currently working" on the project.
