= Gunbuster =

Japanese original video animation series

- Official Blu-ray cover from Discotek Media featuring Kazumi Amano (left), Noriko Takaya (middle), and Jung Freud (right)

トップをねらえ! (Toppu o Nerae!)
- Genre: Mecha; Science fiction; Space opera
- Created by: Toshio Okada
- Original video animation
- Directed by: Hideaki Anno; Shoichi Masuo
- Produced by: Hiroaki Inoue; Minoru Takanashi; Shirō Sasaki
- Written by: Hideaki Anno; Toshio Okada; Hiroyuki Yamaga (uncredited)
- Music by: Kohei Tanaka
- Studio: Gainax
- Licensed by: EU: Kiseki Films (former) Beez Entertainment (former) Anime Limited (current); NA: U.S. Renditions (former) Manga Entertainment (former) Bandai Visual USA (former) Discotek Media (current)
- Released: October 7, 1988 – July 7, 1989
- Runtime: 25–29 minutes
- Episodes: 6
- Anime film

Gunbuster: The Movie
- Directed by: Hideaki Anno; Shoichi Masuo
- Written by: Toshio Okada; Hideaki Anno; Hiroyuki Yamaga (uncredited)
- Music by: Kohei Tanaka
- Studio: Gainax
- Licensed by: EU: Beez Entertainment (former); NA: Bandai Visual USA (former) Sentai Filmworks (current)
- Released: October 1, 2006
- Runtime: 95 minutes
- Manga
- Written by: Kabocha
- Published by: Kadokawa Shoten
- Magazine: Young Ace
- Original run: December 4, 2010 – June 4, 2013
- Volumes: 5
- Sequel
- Diebuster
- icon

Gunbuster, known in Japan as Top o Nerae! (トップをねらえ!, Toppu o Nerae!; Aim for the Top!), is a Japanese original video animation (OVA) series produced by Bandai Visual, Victor Entertainment, and Gainax. It was released from October 1988 to July 1989. It was the directorial debut of Hideaki Anno, best known as the creator and director of Neon Genesis Evangelion. The title is a combination of the titles of classic tennis manga and anime Aim for the Ace! and hit action drama film Top Gun, whose plots inspired Gunbuster's.

The series focuses on a teenage girl named Noriko Takaya, who grows to be a master mecha pilot alongside her senior and inspiration, Kazumi Amano, and helps defend Earth from large extraterrestrials called space monsters. To celebrate Gainax's 20th anniversary, a sequel to Gunbuster, Diebuster (or Gunbuster 2), was released as an OVA. The sequel features new characters and mecha but retains the format and many of the concepts of the original series.

The anime has had several releases on home video since it was first released. It received an English dub in 2022. It has also had soundtrack albums, a manga series, and merchandise such as toys, model kits, and video games. Characters and technology appeared in crossover video games such as games in the Super Robot Wars series and two Neon Genesis Evangelion video games. It received mostly positive reviews and won the Seiun Award for Best Dramatic Presentation in 1990.

== Plot ==
In 2015, a space expedition fleet led by Admiral Yuzo Takaya is destroyed by space monsters. Six years later, Takaya's daughter Noriko, a freshman student, enlists in the Okinawa Girls' Space Pilot High School (沖縄女子宇宙高等学校, Okinawa Joshi Uchū Kōtō-Gakkō; lit. "Okinawa Girls' Space High School") in Okinawa. She is selected with senior student Kazumi Amano to represent Japan in an upcoming space expedition. When the students know Noriko is the daughter of Yuzo and that Coach Koichiro Ohta was one of the survivors of the 2015 space attack, Noriko is subjected to bullying and harassment. Ohta, however, believes Noriko has the same potential as Kazumi, and through "hard work and guts" (努力と根性, Doryoku to konjō), she strives to become the best Machine Weapon pilot and take control of the experimental giant robot Gunbuster (ガンバスター, Ganbasutā) to help Earth win the war against the space monsters. Senior student Reiko Kashiwara challenges Noriko to a Machine Weapon duel, but Noriko defeats Kashiwara. Noriko, Kazumi, and Ohta fly off to the Silver Star orbital base.

Noriko, Kazumi, and Ohta meet Captain Tatsumi Tashiro and Soviet pilot Jung Freud. Kazumi and Jung duel with each other until the duo and Noriko find the remains of a space monster, triggering memories of Noriko's father's death. When the Silver Star detects an unidentified object speeding near Neptune's orbit, Ohta has Noriko and Kazumi investigate the object, later discovered to be Luxion, as part of their sub-light-speed training. Noriko unsuccessfully tries to search for her father. She, Ohta, and Kazumi return to the Silver Star, with six months having passed in the space battleship Exelion's non-relativistic frame, and its construction having just been finished.

On the Exelion, Noriko meets American pilot Smith Toren and develops feelings for him. Noriko pairs up with Smith on her first battle against space monsters after Kazumi dissolves their partnership out of fear for Noriko's safety. Smith is killed, and Noriko feels bad for being unable to help him. She begs Ohta to train her further to prove herself to Kazumi.

Jung challenges Noriko to a duel, but Noriko breaks down when space reminds her of Smith's death. On the Exelion fleet's way back to Earth, space monsters attack it. Tashiro orders the Exelion to perform a kamikaze run on the enemy flagship, but Noriko launches in the uncompleted Gunbuster to deal with the alien threat. Noriko single-handedly destroys the flagship, allowing the Exelion to return to Earth.

Ten years pass, Noriko and Kazumi graduate high school, and the Top Squadron disbands. Ohta sends Noriko and Kazumi to escort the decommissioned Exelion to the center of the space monsters' gathering and detonate its degeneracy reactor. Kazumi breaks down, as Ohta has been diagnosed with space radiation syndrome and has less than six months to live. Noriko and Kazumi combine their ships to form Gunbuster to protect the Exelion from oncoming attacks. They retreat before the Exelion explodes, creating a black hole that takes out the entire space monster army and parts of the Solar System. Gunbuster returns to Earth more than six months later, and Kazumi discovers that Ohta is still alive.

Sixteen years later, Kazumi pays her respects to Ohta after he dies. She goes to Hawaii to see an officer for Project Carneades. She warps to Sagittarius A* to rendezvous with the Eltreum fleet to deliver Buster Machine 3, which is the planet Jupiter compressed into a bomb powerful enough to destroy the space monsters' star system. The fleet and Gunbuster protect the bomb from waves of space monster fleets. The bomb is activated, but fails to detonate, as heavy damage during the battle reduced its energy output to 98%. Noriko and Kazumi go into the bomb and use Gunbuster's main degeneracy reactor to trigger its detonation. The Eltreum fleet warps back to Earth, leaving Gunbuster behind as it outruns the bomb's massive explosion. Gunbuster escapes the black hole and returns to the Solar System on July 6, 14,292. Noriko and Kazumi see that the Earth is dark, but a light pattern appears, saying: "WELCOME HOMƎ!" (オカエリナサイ, Okaerinasai). (Note: The final katakana "イ" is reversed.) Noriko and Kazumi eject from Gunbuster and fall back onto Earth.

=== Episode list ===
No.	Title	Directed by	Written by	Original release date
1	"Whoa! Big Sis and I Are Going to Be Pilots Together?!"; Transliteration: "Shokku! Watashi to Oné-sama ga Pairotto!?" (Japanese: ショック!私とお姉様がパイロット!?)	Hideaki Anno	Toshio Okada (Note: Okada is credited for the entire series's scripts, but in reality only wrote the first two episodes. The rest that were written under his name were actually written by Hiroyuki Yamaga. Yamaga himself is uncredited as a scriptwriter.); Hiroyuki Yamaga	October 7, 1988
2	"Daring! The Genius Girl's Challenge!!"; Transliteration: "Futeki! Tensai Shōjo no Chōsen!!" (Japanese: 不敵!天才少女の挑戦!!)	Hideaki Anno	Toshio Okada; Hiroyuki Yamaga	October 7, 1988
3	"First Love☆First Sortie"; Transliteration: "Hajimete no Tokimeki☆Hajimete no Shutsugeki" (Japanese: 初めてのときめき☆初めての出撃)	Hideaki Anno	Hiroyuki Yamaga	December 30, 1988
4	"Launch!! The Unfinished Ultimate Weapon!"; Transliteration: "Hasshin!! Mikan no Saishū Heiki!" (Japanese: 発進!!未完の最終兵器!)	Hideaki Anno	Hiroyuki Yamaga	December 30, 1988
5	"Please!! There's Time Enough For Love!"; Transliteration: "Onegai!! Ai ni Jikan wo!" (Japanese: お願い!!愛に時間を!)	Hideaki Anno	Hiroyuki Yamaga; Hideaki Anno	July 7, 1989
6	"At the End of Eternity..."; Transliteration: "Hateshi naki, Nagare no Hate ni..." (Japanese: 果てし無き、流れのはてに...)	Hideaki Anno	Hiroyuki Yamaga; Hideaki Anno	July 7, 1989

== Characters ==
Main characters from the series' opening. From left to right: Jung Freud, Koichiro "Coach" Ohta, Kazumi Amano, Noriko Takaya, Kimiko Higuchi, and Captain Tatsumi Tashiro

Noriko Takaya (タカヤ・ノリコ, Takaya Noriko)

Voiced by: Noriko Hidaka (Japanese); Kiane Chula King (English)
Noriko enlists in the Okinawa Girls' Space Pilot High School to follow in the footsteps of her father, Yuzo. Because Yuzo was the captain of the Luxion fleet that was attacked by the space monsters (宇宙怪獣, Uchū Kaijū), Noriko has been nicknamed the "Daughter of Defeat" (全滅娘, Zenmetsu Musume) by other students at the Space Pilot High School, who accuse her of nepotism. She is further subjected to bullying when Koichiro "Coach" Ohta selects her with senior student Kazumi Amano to represent Japan as part of the Top Squadron program. When Ohta convinces her that she has the same potential as Kazumi, Noriko undergoes intense training to improve her piloting skills and prove her peers wrong before venturing to space with Kazumi. Noriko was named after the wife of Gainax storyboard artist Shinji Higuchi.

Kazumi Amano (アマノ・カズミ, Amano Kazumi)
Voiced by: Rei Sakuma (Japanese); Melissa Sternenberg (English)
Nicknamed the "Big Sister" (お姉様, Onēsama) by her peers, Kazumi is the top Machine Weapon pilot of the Okinawa Girls' Space Pilot High School. She quickly becomes friends with Noriko but questions Ohta's decision to pair her with the freshman Noriko. Kazumi was named after Kazumi Okada (née Amano), who was the wife of Gainax CEO Toshio Okada at the time.

Koichiro "Coach" Ohta (オオタ・コウイチロウ / 太田 浩一郎 (コーチ), Ōta Kōichirō (Kōchi))
Voiced by: Norio Wakamoto (Japanese); Bradley Gareth (English)
The Machine Weapon coach of the Okinawa Girls' Space Pilot High School and head of the Gunbuster development program. Ohta was a survivor of the space monsters' attack on the Luxion fleet, having lost sight in his right eye and sustained injuries to his right leg that require him to use a cane. He is always seen wearing aviator sunglasses to conceal the scar across his right eye. Because Captain Yuzo Takaya helped him escape during the attack, Ohta selects Noriko and trains her as a debt of honor to the captain. Ohta was named after manga artist Nao Minda (眠田 直, Minda Nao), whose real name is Kōichirō Ōta. The cane Ohta uses is an homage to Dan Moroboshi, based on his appearance in the 1974 TV series Ultraman Leo.

Jung Freud (ユング・フロイト, Yungu Furoito)
Voiced by: Maria Kawamura (Japanese); Alexandra Yastishock (English)
A Machine Weapon pilot based on the Soviet Union's moon base, Jung Freud develops a fierce rivalry with Kazumi over their piloting skills. Her name is derived from Swiss psychiatrist Carl Jung and Austrian neurologist Sigmund Freud.

Captain Tatsumi Tashiro (タシロ・タツミ, Tashiro Tatsumi)
Voiced by: Tamio Ōki (Japanese); Bill Jenkins (English)
Captain of the space naval ship Exelion (ヱクセリヲン, Ekuserion). After the decommissioned Exelion is detonated to destroy a massive space monster fleet outside the Solar System, Tashiro becomes admiral of the new flagship Eltreum (ヱルトリウム, Erutoriumu). He was named after Atsumi Tashiro (田代 敦巳, Tashiro Atsumi), president of animation studio Group TAC.

Deputy Chief (副長, Fukuchō)
Voiced by: Tomomichi Nishimura
Tashiro's second-in-command aboard the Exelion. His real name is never mentioned throughout the series.

Smith Toren (スミス・トーレン, Sumisu Tōren)
Voiced by: Kazuki Yao (Japanese); Jason Liebrecht (English)
An American Machine Weapon pilot, Smith, meets Noriko after they are dared by their respective dormitories to wander around the Exelion during warp. Smith and Noriko initially do not get along with each other due to differing personalities, but after Kazumi dissolves her partnership with Noriko out of fear for Noriko's safety, Noriko and Smith become partners. During the Top Squadron's first sortie at the Leaf 64 star system, Smith is killed, leaving Noriko with the guilt of not being able to help him during battle. Smith was named after Canadian translator Toren Smith.

Kimiko Higuchi (ヒグチ・キミコ, Higuchi Kimiko)
Voiced by: Yuriko Fuchizaki (Japanese); Lisa Ortiz (English)
Noriko's best friend at the high school. By the time Noriko returns to Earth, Kimiko is married and has a daughter. Kimiko was named after the wife of Gainax animator Takami Akai.

Takami Akai (アカイ・タカミ, Akai Takami)
Voiced by: Yui Makino (Japanese); Cristina Vee (English)
Kimiko's daughter. When Noriko first meets her, Takami is three years old. By 2048, she is a senior student at the high school.

Reiko Kashiwara (カシハラ・レイコ, Kashihara Reiko)
Voiced by: Masako Katsuki (Japanese); Krystal LaPorte (English)
Kazumi's classmate and the second-best Machine Weapon pilot in the Okinawa Girls' Space Pilot High School. Kashiwara is so furious over Ohta's decision to pair Noriko with Kazumi that she challenges Noriko to a duel. Despite being more experienced, Kashiwara loses the duel after Noriko executes the "Inazuma Kick" (イナズマキック, Inazuma Kikku; lit. "Lightning Kick"). By 2032, Kashiwara becomes the school's coach and eventually the principal by 2048.

Yuzo Takaya (タカヤ・ユウゾウ, Takaya Yūzō)
Voiced by: Masashi Hirose (OVA); Katsunosuke Hori (film) (Japanese); Brett Weaver (English)
Noriko's father and admiral of the ship Luxion (るくしおん, Rukushion). He was killed when the space monsters attacked his fleet at the Perseus Arm.

== Production ==
Gunbuster is Hideaki Anno's directorial debut. Because Gainax originally intended to make Royal Space Force: The Wings of Honnêamise and break up, but Wings of Honnêamise consequently performed poorly, Gainax made Gunbuster to help recuperate the losses from Wings of Honnêamise. Taking into account the same work's bad reputation of simply being shown to anime fans, this work has works originally planned by Haruhiko Mikimoto, who worked on Super Dimension Fortress Macross and was popular for beautiful girl characters. The title appears to begin as a parody of the anime Aim for the Ace! and the film Top Gun, is a homage to Shōwa era anime and tokusatsu, and completely changes in a clearly approachable style. The plots of Aim for the Ace! and Top Gun inspired the plot of Gunbuster.

This work starts as a parody at the core, but later, the story has serious content, getting concepts from Joe Haldeman's science fiction novel The Forever War, actively inserting time dilation. The sixth and last episode is shot in black-and-white and has the last scene show minimal coloring. In the remastered version, that part is black-and-white. Regarding planning for the last step, Anno and Okada said, "If that is it, it is good".

The characters' names come from staff members and people with whom Gainax was closely involved. The protagonist Noriko Takaya is named after this work's art staff member Noriko Takaya. Koichiro Ohta is named after Toshio Okada's friend and manga artist Nao Minda's real name. (Note: Although he does not use his real name in public, in the "Sizzler Project" special segment of the Gunbuster Remaster DVD, his ending illustration is credited as Koichiro Ohta.)

=== Themes ===
One theme of Gunbuster is personal relationships. Noriko, characterized as a plucky and emotional girl, looks up to Kazumi, her mature and confident senior. She also has a friendship with Kimiko, but Kimiko ages normally on Earth as opposed to Noriko's slower aging in space because of time dilation.

The effect of time dilation is a theme of Gunbuster.

The feeling of the world aging faster than Noriko instills a sense of loss. In Gunbuster, when a character approaches the speed of light in space, time slows down for that character. Aspirations and relationships become lost because of the priority to rescue humanity in space. Most science fiction stories do not address this problem, and Gunbuster shows the consequences of this dilemma.

The importance of hard work and will resonates in Gunbuster, as it starts with this theme and continues throughout the series. Although Noriko makes mistakes in the series, she deals with the weight of the consequences of these mistakes, along with the weight of trauma, in her interactions with other characters and grows as a character. Because of how rigorously Ohta trains Noriko, she grows into a master pilot.

=== Music ===
Kohei Tanaka, who graduated from the Department of Composition of Tokyo University of the Arts' School of Music, worked for Victor Entertainment for three years, attended Berklee College of Music, and would later compose music for anime such as Otaku no Video and One Piece, composed the music for Gunbuster. The first soundtrack album, Top wo Nerae! Ongaku Daizukan (トップをねらえ!音楽大図鑑; lit. Aim for the Top! Music Encyclopedia), was released in Japan through Victor Entertainment on June 7, 1989. It features the opening theme "Active Heart" (アクティブ・ハート, Akutibu Hāto) and ending theme "Try Again...!" (トライ Again・・・!, Torai Again...!) by Noriko Sakai, plus the insert song "Top wo Nerae! Fly High" (トップをねらえ! 〜Fly High〜) by Noriko Hidaka and Rei Sakuma, Tanaka's score for the series' first four episodes, and two original radio dramas. The CD release also includes "Kimi mo Onkyō Kantoku! Top wo Nerae! Naserifu Dai Kōshin" (キミも音響監督!トップをねらえ!名セリフ大行進; lit. "You Can Also Be the Sound Director! Aim for the Top! Parade of Famous Lines"), a collection of sound clips by the voice cast. The album was reissued on December 18, 1996.

The second soundtrack album, Top wo Nerae! Ultra Sound Collection: Tanaka Kohei no Sekai (トップをねらえ!ウルトラ・サウンド・コレクション 〜田中公平の世界〜; lit. Aim for the Top! Ultra Sound Collection: The World of Kohei Tanaka), was released on March 21, 1990. It features more of Tanaka's score for all six episodes, plus the image song "Tobe! Gunbuster" (翔べ!ガンバスター; lit. "Fly! Gunbuster") by Kazuki Yao, one radio drama, and the symphonic suite "Kōkyōshi Gunbuster" (交響詩「GUNBUSTER」; lit. "Symphonic Poem Gunbuster"). Like the first soundtrack, this album was reissued on December 18, 1996.

A box set titled Sound Collection of Gunbuster (トップをねらえ!響綜覧, Top wo Nerae! Kyōsōran) was released on August 24, 1994. The three-disc set compiles the first two soundtracks and adds more background music and dialogue tracks, as well as new songs and karaoke tracks.

FlyingDog released the soundtrack Top wo Nerae! Ongaku-shū (トップをねらえ!音楽集; lit. Aim for the Top! Music Collection) on March 26, 2013, exclusively on music download and streaming media platforms. The album compiles the first two soundtracks, omitting the opening and ending themes, radio dramas, and character voice clips.

== Releases ==
=== Japan ===
Gunbuster was originally released in Japan by Bandai over three volumes on VHS and LaserDisc, with two episodes per volume. It was then re-released on a LaserDisc box set in 1995, featuring two new Science Lesson episodes. The series was released on Region 2 DVD in 2001. A remastered four-disc DVD set was released three years later with dramatically improved image quality and new extras such as three short animations, a rough cut of episode five, and an unmatted version of episode six. In addition, a supplemental DVD titled Gunbuster Perfect Guide was released, featuring exclusive interviews with the staff and voice cast, plus a 161-page book with original artwork and production notes.

In 2006, a theatrical version of Gunbuster was released in Japan, featuring a 5.1 soundtrack containing new sound effects, the original score, and re-recorded dialogue by the original Japanese voice actors. The feature-length film is an abridged version of the original OVA series, using the same animated footage as the original. It was released as a double feature with a condensed version of Diebuster as Gunbuster vs. Diebuster: Aim for the Top! - The Gattai!! Movie (トップをねらえ!&トップをねらえ2! 合体劇場版!!, Toppu wo Nerae! & Toppu wo Nerae 2! Gattai Gekijōban!!).

Bandai Visual released a Blu-ray set of the OVA series with extras. It was released in Japan on February 24, 2012, in regular and complete limited edition sets. Both sets feature the newly re-recorded 5.1 audio (that was used for the theatrical compilation), along with the original 2.0 mix, remastered video, a brand new short, audio commentary, video shorts, and a 16-page booklet. The complete edition also included a bonus disc, full of production materials, previously unseen video footage, and a 100-page booklet.

=== North America ===
Gunbuster was first released with English subtitles in North America starting on February 1, 1990, on VHS by U.S. Renditions as their first release. It was later re-released by Manga Entertainment. On November 24, 2006, Bandai Visual USA released a limited, region-free reprint of the 2004 Region 2 remastered DVD set exclusively at Kinokuniya Bookstores. On February 20, 2007, Bandai Visual USA officially released the remastered Region 1 DVD box set under their Honneamise label, with the series spanning over three discs.

Gunbuster: The Movie was released on Blu-ray in the U.S. by Honneamise. It was initially released on DVD as the box set Gunbuster vs. Diebuster: Aim for the Top! The GATTAI!! Movie. Following the liquidation of Bandai Visual USA and Bandai Entertainment's acquisition of the Honneamise label, a high-definition Blu-ray version was released in November 2008 by Bandai Entertainment. Maiden Japan later licensed Gunbuster: The Movie on Blu-ray and DVD on May 17, 2016. It was re-released by Sentai Filmworks on September 13, 2022.

In an interview with Anime on DVD, Jonathan Clements stated that "the Music & Effects track has been lost, and [an English dub] would need to be reconstructed from the ground up". Discotek Media released Gunbuster on Blu-ray on May 30, 2023, with a dub produced by Sound Cadence Studios, marking the first time the OVA series was dubbed in English.

=== United Kingdom and Europe ===
Gunbuster was released for the European market by Kiseki Films on a region 2 DVD, but this release suffered from poor video quality and inconsistent subtitles. In addition, the bath scene in episode two was heavily edited, with the footage replaced with slowed-down mecha scenes while retaining the audio track.

Gunbuster: The Movie was released on Blu-ray by Beez Entertainment in the United Kingdom in 2008. Anime Limited released the OVA series on Blu-ray in August 2023 in two editions: standard Blu-ray and Collector's Edition; the latter includes a 48-page art book and a double-sided A3 poster. The Blu-ray includes Discotek Media's English dub.

== Manga ==
In 1989, Bandai published Comic Gunbuster (コミックガンバスター, Komikku Ganbasutā), an anthology manga featuring side stories of the OVA's characters. The manga ran for two volumes.

In 2010, Kadokawa Shoten published a new manga adaptation of Gunbuster, with artwork by Kabocha. The manga ran for five volumes, with the final volume released three years later.

== Merchandise ==
=== Toys ===
In the mid-1990s, Kaiyodo, in association with Xebec, released a PVC figure of Gunbuster. Though limited in posability, the figure featured an extra set of arms and hands, as well as the weapons Buster Tomahawk and Buster Home Run from the radio dramas. In 2005, Kaiyodo released a newer figure sculpted by Katsuhisa Yamaguchi (of Revoltech fame). Although shorter than the original, this newer figure was more detailed and poseable than its predecessor. A newer version of Gunbuster was released in the Revoltech line as Figure No. 101 six years later. Once again sculpted by Yamaguchi, it is capable of transforming into both Buster Machines and has parts to replicate, tearing out the power generator core.

In November 2006, Bandai released a large die-cast toy replica of Gunbuster under the Soul of Chogokin line. Just like in episode five of the series, the toy is a combination of Buster Machines 1 and 2. It includes an array of weapons that were used in both the anime and radio drama, as well as a miniature of Kazumi's RX-7 Machine Weapon and a display stand designed to resemble a launchpad. Also included are accessories that can be used to replicate the final scene in episode 6, where Gunbuster removes its degeneracy generator core from its chest. The toy was re-released in September 2015 as "GX-34R Gunbuster (Buster Alloy Color Ver.)", featuring a dark blue metallic finish. Two years earlier, Bandai released a smaller, more affordable Gunbuster figure under the Super Robot Chogokin line. Despite lacking the transformation feature of the Soul of Chogokin toy, this figure features extreme poseability and comes with two Buster Home Runs and parts for the Double Buster Collider, as well as the power generator core parts. A Tamashii Web exclusive "Hard Work and Guts" Armament Set (努力と根性の武装セット, Doryoku to Konjō no Busō Setto), released in July 2013, included the Buster Shield, Buster Missile arms, two Buster Tomahawks, and effect parts for the Buster Colliders and Super Inazuma Kick.

Studio HalfEye also released a transformable replica of Gunbuster in 2006. In contrast to Bandai's die-cast toy, this figure is made of resin plastic and is priced higher.

Hong Kong–based toy company CCS Toys released a premium Gunbuster figure in February 2024 under the Mortal Mind line to commemorate the 35th anniversary of the OVA series.

Figures of Noriko have also been manufactured. Yellow Submarine (a division of Takara) released a poseable doll, while Kotobukiya and Kaiyodo sold non-poseable figures. Bandai had a limited-edition Noriko & Nono figure set bundled with the North America and Japan DVD release of Gunbuster vs. Diebuster Aim for the Top! The GATTAI!! Movie. Good Smile Company released a Nendoroid figure of Noriko in June 2024.

=== Model kits ===
In November 2019, Aoshima Bunka Kyozai released a 1/1000 scale Gunbuster model kit. The kit was reissued in August 2020 as the "Black Hole Starship Edition" (縮退炉エディション, Shukutairo Edishon), featuring additional weapons and accessories. Three years and two months later, the kit was reissued as the "Super Inazuma Kick Ver." (スーパーイナズマキックver., Sūpā Inazuma Kikku ver.), which features a redesigned waist and hip assembly and includes effect parts and a display stand to replicate Gunbuster's signature attack.

In November 2021, Bandai released a Gunbuster kit from their Shokugan Modeling Project (SMP) Alternative Destiny line. Three months later, an online-exclusive expansion kit called the "Infinite Super Inazuma Kick Set" (∞スーパーイナズマキックセット, Infinito Sūpā Inazuma Kikku Setto) was released, featuring additional weapons and accessories.

Kaiyodo released a Gunbuster model kit in November 2023. The kit includes figurines of Noriko and Kazumi.

In February 2025, Good Smile Company released the Moderoid Miniature Combining & Transforming Gunbuster model kit. At 115 mm in height, it is the smallest Gunbuster figure to fully transform into Buster Machines 1 and 2 without removing or changing parts. Bandai will release a new Gunbuster kit from their SMP line in August 2025. Like the Moderoid Miniature Gunbuster, this kit features perfect transformation. An expansion kit will also be released exclusively on the Premium Bandai website, featuring parts to make the kit anime-accurate and all of Gunbuster's weapons and accessories.

=== Video games ===
In February 2005, Bandai released Top wo Nerae! Gunbuster for the PlayStation 2 console, developed by Shade. It expanded the series with a game that played out as an entirely new third edition that added to the themes of the original two animated series. The 25-episode story featured both roaming adventure scenes where defense pilot Noriko Takaya converses with characters and collects items to develop the story, as well as action scenes that put Noriko and co-pilot Kazumi Amano into the cockpit of Gunbuster to battle in heated combat. The action parts allow the player to perform all the trademark moves, such as the Buster Beam, Homing Laser, and Super Lighting Kick, with Noriko shouting out the commands with just as much enthusiasm as Noriko does in the show. Kara Dennison, a writer for Otaku USA Magazine, said the game provides recap sequences, something she noted video games generally do not have when a player takes a break from a video game for some time and forgets what happened after the player returns.

In March 2010, Heiwa Corporation released the pachinko game CR Top wo Nerae!

Cybernetic Hi-School, the third installment of Gainax's eroge strip-quiz video game series for the PC-9801 and MSX, focused on characters from Gunbuster.

==== Crossover video games ====
Gunbuster has appeared in the Super Robot Wars franchise since its debut in Super Robot Wars F Final in 1997.

The characters also appear in the Gainax video games Neon Genesis Evangelion: Eva and Good Friends and Neon Genesis Evangelion: Battle Orchestra.

== Reception ==
Reception for the anime has generally been positive. A writer for Anime News Network stated that Gunbuster conveys a message to courageously face fears and that Noriko is the most developed character. The writer called Gunbuster "enriching and heartwarming" but said that some of the things in the first episode were unnecessary and could have been cut for time constraints. That writer also commented that the story could have allowed more character development for other characters but overall praised Gunbuster. Michael Toole, who also wrote for Anime News Network, said the anime starts as a parody, but it later alternates between fan service and existential horror because of time dilation and the need to fight space monsters. He noted that the series makes humorous references and praised its brilliance. He previously saw the series in the mid-1990s and called it a "masterpiece", but after watching it again, he remarked on its cohesion. Jason Huff of The Anime Review stated that Gunbuster's story is cohesive and praised its music. A writer for THEM Anime Reviews praised the quality of the series and favored the ending of this anime. Kara Dennison of Otaku USA Magazine called the series "a fun mash-up of Aim for the Ace! and Top Gun" and stated the ending would sadden viewers. She also said this series inspired other mecha series such as GaoGaiGar and Gurren Lagann. Joseph Luster, also of Otaku USA Magazine, called Gunbuster a "total classic". Max Covill of Polygon credits Gunbuster as a foundational work for its creators, without which the highly successful anime series Neon Genesis Evangelion and its successors could not have been made.

A writer for Anime News Network favored the anime's appearance and stated that frames avoided being reused. That writer also praised the detail in the animation of the mecha, the lighting, the particle effects, and the characters. Jason Huff of The Anime Review praised the animation of Gunbuster and Haruhiko Mikimoto's designs, but he remarked that the moments of nudity, although not sexual in any context, were unnecessary. He also said that female characters have their bodies "strictly obeying the laws of physics" and that it could potentially turn some people away from a show that celebrates women. A writer for THEM Anime Reviews remarked that despite the last episode being in black and white, the animation quality increased near the end of the series.

In 1990, Gunbuster won the Seiun Award for Best Dramatic Presentation.

In a collaboration with Ikemen Gallery, D2's Kenki Yamaguchi cosplayed as Ohta.
