= Noriko Takaya =

Fictional character from Gunbuster

- Gunbuster character
- Noriko Takaya as she appears in episode 1
- First appearance: Gunbuster episode 1: "Whoa! Big Sis and I Are Going to Be Pilots Together?!" (1988)
- Created by: Gainax
- Designed by: Haruhiko Mikimoto
- Voiced by: Japanese: Noriko Hidaka; English: Kiane Chula King

In-universe information
- Full name: Noriko Takaya
- Nickname: Daughter of Defeat
- Gender: Female
- Relatives: Yuzo Takaya (father)
- Nationality: Japanese
- Birthday: September 12, 2006
- Age: 15 (Note: Gunbuster episodes 1 and 2); 16 (Note: Gunbuster episodes 2–4); 26 (Note: Gunbuster episode 5, due to time dilation); 42 (Note: Beginning of Gunbuster episode 6, due to time dilation); 12,285 (Note: End of Gunbuster episode 6, due to time dilation)

Noriko Takaya (Note: Known in Japanese as タカヤ・ノリコ (Takaya Noriko)) is the protagonist of Gunbuster, an anime series created by Gainax. Named after an animator at Studio Ghibli and voiced by Noriko Hidaka in Japanese and Kiane Chula King in English, the role significantly furthered the voice acting careers of both Noriko Hidaka and Kiane Chula King. Critics have praised Noriko's appearance and character arc of growing from an inexperienced pilot through hard work and will. She influenced the development of characters such as Shinji Ikari of Neon Genesis Evangelion and popularized the "Gainax Pose", an arm fold commonly seen in anime and other media.

== Conception ==
Gainax created Gunbuster as an ironic response to the financial losses of Royal Space Force: The Wings of Honnêamise, their previous film. The firm's staff designed the characters with Haruhiko Mikimoto, a character designer for Super Dimension Fortress Macross, and were influenced by Aim for the Ace! and Top Gun. Noriko Hidaka, who voiced Noriko, said that the concept of Gunbuster was taking the average of Aim for the Ace! and Top Gun. Gunbuster was the first anime to combine sports drama, typically aimed at female audiences, with super robot action, typically aimed at male audiences.

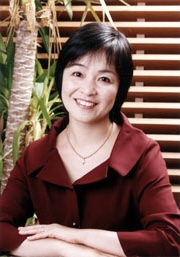
Noriko Hidaka, the actress for Noriko Takaya

Noriko's name comes from an animator named Noriko Takaya, the wife of Gainax co-founder Shinji Higuchi. She worked at Studio Ghibli, where some of Gainax's staff previously worked with her, and worked on animations for Nausicaä of the Valley of the Wind and Akira. She also worked on Gunbuster. Noriko Hidaka voiced Noriko in the original Japanese version of the anime, the film Gunbuster vs. Diebuster, and in the video games. Kiane Chula King voiced her in the English dubbed version.

== Appearances ==
=== Gunbuster ===
The character of Noriko Takaya first appears in the anime Gunbuster. Noriko was born on September 12, 2006, to Yuzo Takaya, a space pilot and captain of the Luxion. She is from Osaka. In 2015, space monsters attack the Luxion, and Yuzo dies. Noriko joins the Okinawa Girls' Space Pilot High School to become a mecha pilot, so she follows in her father's footsteps. At school, she is close friends with Kimiko Higuchi. Noriko starts training to be a mecha pilot by jumping rope. She meets Kazumi Amano, becomes infatuated with her, and treats her like an older sister. Then, Coach Koichiro Ohta tells the students piloting mecha to start their training. Noriko tries to pilot her mecha but is very clumsy. Reiko Kashiwara and her allies bully Noriko because she is selected to go to space. Noriko cries and approaches Ohta. Ohta tells her to train more, so she does. One night, Reiko and Noriko have a mecha duel. Initially, the students thought Reiko would win, but Noriko performs an Inazuma Kick on Reiko's mecha and wins. Ohta, Kazumi, and Noriko board a jet to the Silver Star orbital base.

From the jet, they see a Soviet mecha and work being done on the Exelion. They later meet the pilot of the Soviet mecha, Jung Freud, on the Silver Star. During training, Kazumi and Jung challenge each other while Noriko is looking for them. Kazumi, Noriko, and Ohta fly to the unidentified object approaching Neptune's orbit. Noriko finds out it is the Luxion. Knowing that her father is on the Luxion, Noriko goes to the Luxion and tries to look for him but finds that he is gone, which emotionally affects Noriko. Ohta finds her and returns with Kazumi to the Exelion, where they discover it is finished. At the Exelion opening ceremony (which also served as a joint birthday party for both Noriko and Jung), Noriko cries and runs out of the room where the ceremony is being held.

Noriko overhears Kazumi claiming that Noriko is a liability. Noriko meets an American named Smith Toren. They initially do not get along but later fall for each other. Noriko pairs up with him to fight, but Toren is killed in battle, which weighs on her. During warp, the crew of the Exelion finds space monsters, and Captain Tatsumi Tashiro orders a kamikaze run, but Noriko cries in a room as the battle goes on. She decides against crying and resolves to fight with her strength instead. She then pilots an unfinished Gunbuster and single-handedly fights the space monsters, stopping the space monsters from further attacking the Exelion and demonstrating that she grew to become a master pilot.

Noriko, Kazumi, and Ohta return to Earth. Noriko and Kazumi graduate from the Okinawa Girls' Space Pilot High School and see Kimiko, an adult with a child. Later, Noriko sees Kazumi and Ohta, now married, fighting each other. Noriko goes to a beach to sunbathe and talks with Jung. She contemplates her recent experiences with Kimiko, Kazumi, and Ohta. Noriko and Kazumi later pilot Buster Machine 1 and Buster Machine 2, respectively. They fly the Buster Machines into space with the Exelion. As they pass Jupiter, they find space monsters. Kazumi cries at the thought of losing Ohta because he was diagnosed with space radiation syndrome and has less than six months to live, and due to time dilation for Noriko and Kazumi, they will not get back before then. Noriko snaps Kazumi out of crying and backing out, and they combine their Buster Machines into Gunbuster. After working together to defeat the space monsters by the Exelion's explosion, they return to Earth, and Kazumi cries when she finds Ohta alive. Noriko tries not to cry, so she runs out.

Noriko, Kazumi, and Jung are on the Eltreum in the last episode. They are in a fleet to deliver Buster Machine 3, a black hole bomb with Jupiter condensed. The fleet protects the bomb from space monsters before detonation. Noriko and Kazumi go into Buster Machine 3 to use Gunbuster's main degeneracy reactor to start the detonation. They fly out quickly and find themselves above Earth on July 6, 14,292, where they see a "WELCOME HOMƎ!" (Note: The final katakana "イ" in the original message, オカエリナサイ (Okaerinasai), is reversed.) message on the Earth. Noriko and Kazumi leave the Gunbuster and fall back to Earth.

=== Other appearances ===
Noriko Takaya, right, as she appears in the first Gunbuster Science Lesson. The Science Lessons depict her as a shorter, stubbier, and more exaggerated version of how she appears in the main Gunbuster series.

In the Science Lessons, Noriko, Kazumi, and Ohta appear as chibi versions of themselves discussing the science behind concepts in Gunbuster, such as the speed of light. In later episodes, the chibi versions become more expressive but slimmer. Noriko's expressions in the Science Lessons are more exaggerated than in the main Gunbuster series, including the appearance of a V-shaped mouth when scared. In the sequel OVA, Diebuster, the protagonist, Nono, admires Noriko's legacy and wishes to be like her. Nono refers to Noriko as Nono-Riri because her memory of Noriko is disorganized, so she mutters the syllables of her name. The last episode of Diebuster shows Noriko and Kazumi descending to Earth from the Earth's point of view.

Bandai published two volumes of Comic Gunbuster in 1989 and 1991. These volumes show Noriko in various situations, such as chibi and four-panel strips. Kabocha's manga adaptation of Gunbuster follows the anime with some slight differences. Noriko has also appeared in some video games, such as the video games based on Gunbuster, the games in the Super Robot Wars series, Neon Genesis Evangelion: Eva and Good Friends, and Neon Genesis Evangelion: Battle Orchestra.

=== Merchandise ===
Merchandise featuring the character has been released many times since Gunbuster was released. General Products, an anime goods store, was selling Noriko HG and Noriko EX figures as of April 1990. She also had keyrings, art prints, and a photographic bromide with her and three other characters. In 2004, Kotobukiya Co., Ltd. released a 1/6 scale PVC figure of Noriko. In 2006, Kaiyodo released a 22 cm (8 1/2 in) tall figure of her sculpted by Bome. In 2012, CM's Corporation released a 20 cm (8 in) tall Gutto-Kuru figure of her. In June 2024, Good Smile Company released a Nendoroid of her sculpted by Udono Kazuyoshi.

== Characterization and themes ==
In Gunbuster, Noriko shows determination in her rigorous training and striving for excellence through "hard work and guts". Dan Casey, a contributor to Nerdist, states that she starts the story as a clumsy adolescent. Tamaki Saitō and Hiroki Azuma say that under the rigorous training of her coach, Noriko became a master pilot. Via Erhard, a writer for Game Rant, states that although Noriko is generally calm, she ruthlessly kills her enemies. An editor for Anime News Network notes that Noriko has moments of doubting herself throughout the story, but as she becomes a master, she understands that her position carries a lot of weight.

Noriko admires Kazumi and looks up to her as if she were her older sister and praises Kazumi's skill in operating mecha, but Kazumi says it was her hard work. Zach Godin, a contributor to Crunchyroll News, states that Kazumi supports Noriko throughout Gunbuster despite being her senior. Peter Laliberte of MAHQ wrote that Kazumi was initially portrayed as elegant but wanted to back out because of the possibility of losing Ohta, causing Noriko to tell her to snap out of this behavior and work together to stop the space monsters. Tamaki Saitō and Hiroki Azuma note that Noriko and Kazumi could be seen as phallic mothers, women who have a sense of authority and perfection.

Loss and trauma are defining themes in Gunbuster. They are prominent in Noriko through traveling at lightspeed and consequently losing touch with the world she knew and dealing with unresolved trauma. Loss because of traveling at lightspeed causes someone to think of time differently and can become emotionally difficult for the person, as Noriko's growth showed. According to Anime News Network, because of time dilation, fighting to protect Earth and then coming back to see it significantly changed can make one feel as though they are not part of the lives of those they care about.

Noriko also shows behaviors of an otaku, as animators who enjoyed anime and became professionals founded Gainax. An otaku scholar, Lawrence Eng, said that Gunbuster could have been the earliest anime with a character demonstrating otaku behavior, as Kazumi teases Noriko "about her knowledge of anime and science fiction." This anime was also one of the first released in the United States to keep its Japanese-language track, with an English dub not released until 2022. Western viewers learned about the word otaku through this anime. In the main Gunbuster series, Noriko's otaku behavior is hinted at, but the Science Lessons episodes show her otaku behavior more clearly. In a later Science Lessons episode, Noriko is shown to be a fan of Sailor Moon. The Film Comic books published by Bandai in 1988 and 1989 describe Noriko's hobbies as building plastic model kits and watching tokusatsu.

== Reception and cultural impact ==
Tamaki Saitō, Hiroki Azuma, and Patrick Galbraith, a professor at Senshu University, as well as others, have described Noriko as having a kawaii appearance. Max Covill, a writer for Polygon, wrote that the struggles Noriko had to go through make her into a heroine, including the Rocky-style training and an awareness of time dilation every time she goes to space up until the end of Gunbuster, made it "hard to imagine anyone not tearing up at the end." In addition, Via Erhard notes that Noriko is one of the most merciless female characters with one of the highest kill counts because of her determination in battle. Fullmetal Alchemist author Hiromu Arakawa stated that she was affected by time slipping away from Noriko because of time dilation, especially at the concept of Kimiko Higuchi marrying and having a child on Earth in a short amount of time for Noriko in space. She believed Noriko's return after about 12,000 years in space was unthinkable.

Noriko contributed to the pairing of a giant robot with a beautiful girl. Toshio Okada, the writer of Gunbuster, stated that he thought such a pairing was necessary for success in media because he believed that people find "catharsis in the fighting of the weak." She also contributed to the trope known as the "beautiful fighting girl" and laid the foundation for characterizing girls perceived to be lovable and moe in the 1990s. Specifically, the term moeru, (Note: 萌える (moeru)) meaning "to love", would later be applied to such characters. Regarding this term, Tamaki Saitō states, "To love an anime is ... to love (moeru) the beautiful girls in anime. An anime creator is born from the experience of moe as a trauma, and the next generation of anime fans finds moe in the heroines he creates." Noriko is also remembered for popularizing the Gainax Pose, an arm fold typically done with a scowl or authoritative look. Max Covill notes that Noriko plans to cause her enemy significant trouble when she crosses her arms. The Gainax Pose is typically made at a turning point in an anime that needs a compelling image to set the scene. Later series created by Gainax, such as Diebuster and Gurren Lagann, and produced by others, such as Kill la Kill and Cyberpunk: Edgerunners, use this pose, and it has appeared in other media, such as Gravity Rush 2. Isaiah Colbert of Gizmodo wrote that even though the pose originally appeared in Getter Robo G, Noriko made this pose popular. He described the pose as "the person doing it is closing themselves off to the world on some Sigma grindset type beat" because of Gainax's choice to have a character stand in a notable way. He cited Joe Navarro, a former FBI agent and body language expert, when Navarro said that crossing one's arms is a "self-hug" and a way to comfort oneself. Colbert applied Navarro's statement to the suffering she had to endure, compared Noriko's suffering to that of Matthew McConaughey's character in Interstellar and Shinji Ikari in Neon Genesis Evangelion, and said that she makes the Gainax pose in response to the burden she must shoulder.

Noriko's character influenced Shinji Ikari of Neon Genesis Evangelion and Simon of Gurren Lagann. Noriko's early portrayal in Gunbuster influenced Shinji's portrayals in Neon Genesis Evangelion, as her character arc in the first four episodes shows that her failures and losses compound when she has to deal with more significant threats. Noriko's moments of self-doubt and anxiety contributed to the development of Shinji. Just as Noriko was trained by Ohta, in Gurren Lagann, Simon grows under the training of Kamina and becomes a powerful pilot.
