= Hiroyuki Yamaga =

Japanese anime director and producer

Hiroyuki Yamaga 山賀 博之
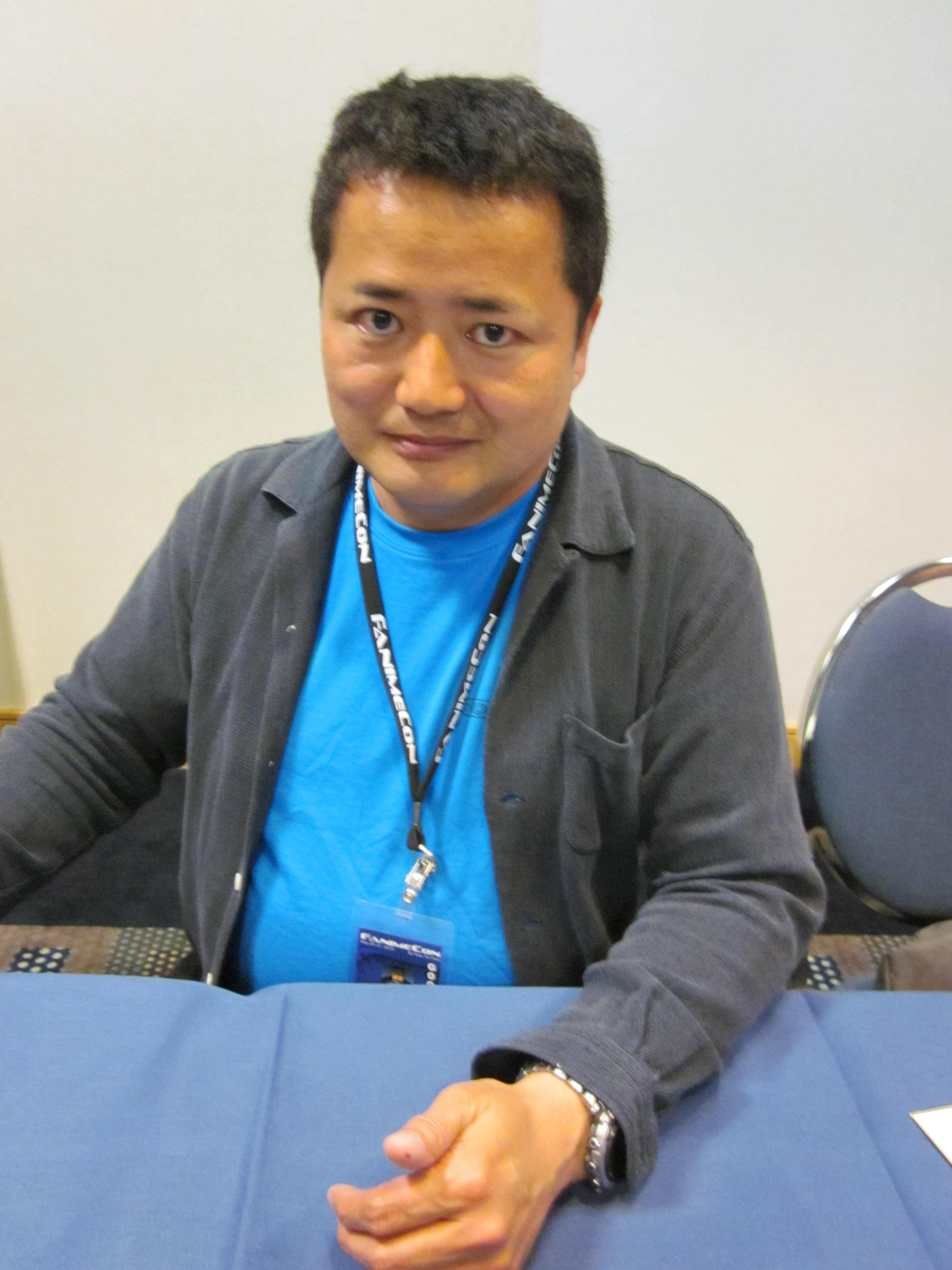
- Yamaga at FanimeCon 2010
- Born: March 23, 1962 (age 64); Niigata, Niigata, Japan
- Occupations: Anime director, producer

Hiroyuki Yamaga (山賀 博之, Yamaga Hiroyuki) is a Japanese anime director and producer, and a founding member of the animation studio Gainax. He is best known for directing the film Royal Space Force: The Wings of Honnêamise (1987) at age 24, directing Mahoromatic (2001), Magical Shopping Arcade Abenobashi (2002), and an episode of Gurren Lagann (2007). Yamaga also wrote the screenplay for Gundam 0080 (1989).

He is portrayed by actor Tsuyoshi Muro in the 2014 TV Drama Aoi Honō based on the autobiographical manga by his fellow Osaka University of Arts alumnus Kazuhiko Shimamoto. Yamaga himself cameos in Episode 7 of the series, playing the owner of a restaurant where his fictional counterpart faints.

== Filmography ==
Year	Film	Director	Writer	Producer	Notes
1981	Daicon III	Yes		Yes	Short, Opening animation
1983	Daicon IV	Yes		Yes	Short, Opening animation
1987	Wings of Honneamise	Yes	Yes		
1988	Gunbuster		Yes		Mini-Series
1989	Mobile Suit Gundam 0080: War in the Pocket		Yes		Series
1989	Komatsu Sakyo Anime Gekijo		Yes		
1991	Otaku no Video		Yes		Mini-series
1995	Neon Genesis Evangelion				Series
1997	Neon Genesis Evangelion: The End of Evangelion				
2000	FLCL				Mini-Series
2001	Mahoromatic	Yes	Yes		Series
2002	Petite Princess Yucie		Yes		Series
2002	Magical Shopping Arcade Abenobashi	Yes	Yes		Series
2004	This Ugly Yet Beautiful World		Yes		Series
2005	He Is My Master				Series
2006	Gunbuster: The Movie		Yes		
2007	Gurren Lagann				Series
2008	Corpse Princess: Aka/Kuro			Yes	
2011	The Mystic Archives of Dantalian		Yes		Screenplay
2016	Omoi no Kakera				Short
