= Ryūsuke Hikawa =

Japanese anime critic and writer (born 1958)

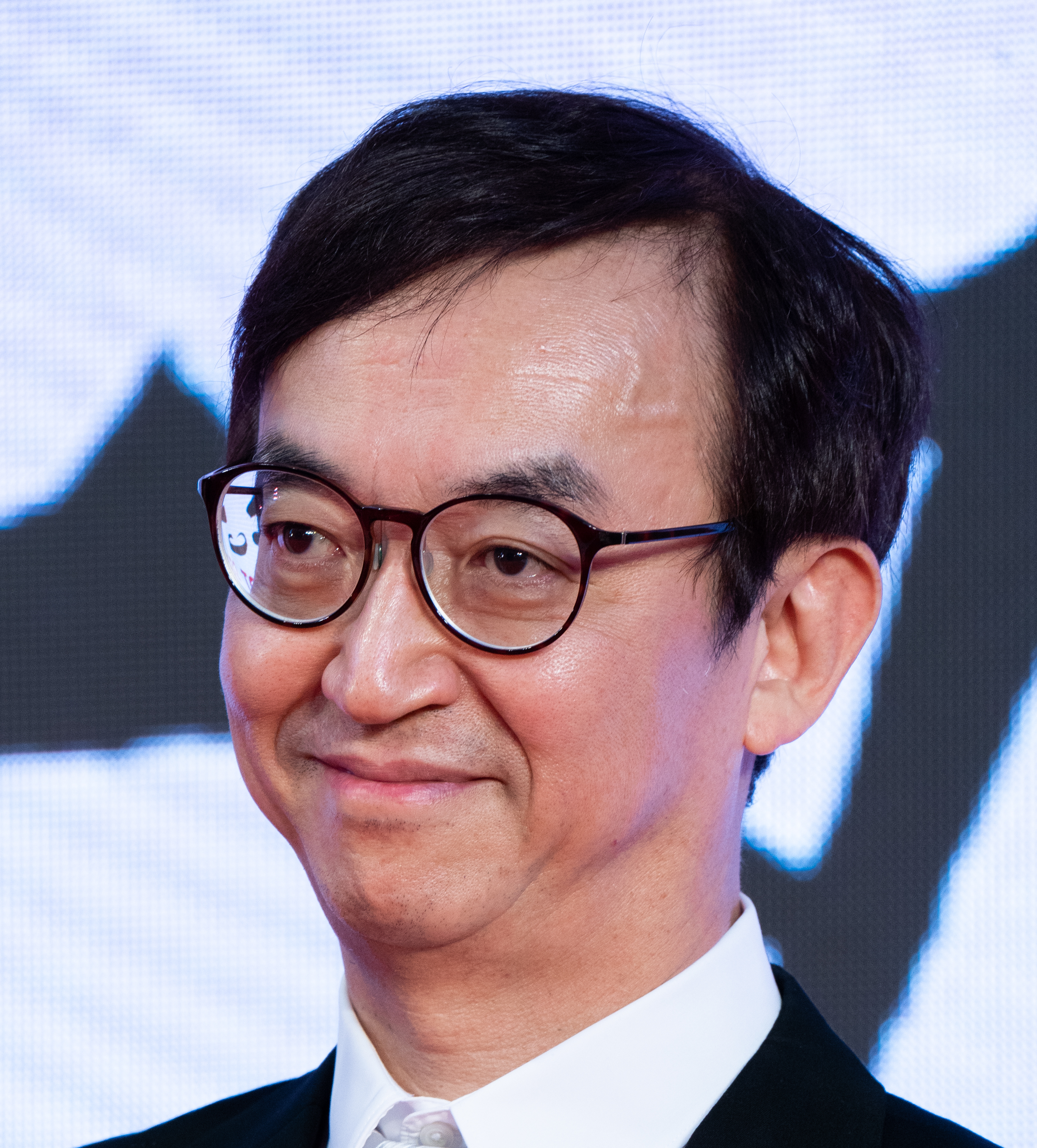
Hikawa in 2019

Ryūsuke Hikawa (氷川竜介, Hikawa Ryūsuke) (born 1958 in Himeji) is a Japanese anime critic and writer.

== Overview ==
He has hosted the TV program Anime Maestro (アニメマエストロ) on NHK, and the Totte Oki A-News anime news program on Animax.
