= Noriko Hidaka =

Japanese actress (born 1962)

- 日髙 のり子
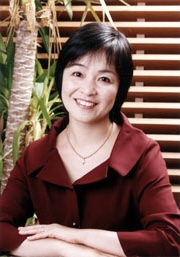
- Hidaka in 2007
- Born: Noriko Itō; May 31, 1962 (age 64); Chiyoda, Tokyo, Japan
- Other names: Noriko Nagai (永井 範子); Nonko (ノン子)
- Occupations: Actress; voice actress; singer; narrator
- Years active: 1980–present
- Agent: Big Mount
- Children: 2
- Website: https://norikohidaka.com/

Noriko Itō (伊東 範子, Itō Noriko; born May 31, 1962), better known by the stage name of Noriko Hidaka (日髙 のり子, Hidaka Noriko), is a Japanese actress, voice actress, singer and narrator. She played Minami Asakura in Touch, Akane Tendo in Ranma ½, Satsuki Kusakabe in My Neighbor Totoro, Near in Death Note, Jean Roque Raltique in Nadia: The Secret of Blue Water, Kikyō in Inuyasha,Yuki Tsukumo in Jujutsu Kaisen, Patricia O'Sullivan in Mischievous Twins: The Tales of St. Clare's, Erica Fontaine in Sakura Wars and Masumi Sera in Detective Conan. She is also the dub actress for Jayma Mays in the American TV series Glee, as well as in The Smurfs film series.

== Biography ==
Hidaka was born in the Kudan area of Chiyoda, Tokyo, Japan, where she attended Fujimi Elementary School. Her parents owned a Western-style clothing store named "Tailor Itō". She began her career as an idol star, but switched to voice acting, and was employed by the talent management firm 81 Produce until 2006. Hidaka used to use the kanji variant 日髙 (note that the second kanji is different). She switched to the current usage (日高) around 1995 when she found that it was written that way already on many things and after friends recommended the kanji with the lower stroke count. Her fans have given her the affectionate name "Nonko" (ノン子). In 1982, during her time as an idol star, Hidaka appeared in the commercial for Nivea skin milk. She has also done voice-over commercials for programs and games, in which she plays a role for 3rd Super Robot Wars Alpha: To the End of the Galaxy.

== Filmography ==
=== Anime television ===
- Super Dimension Cavalry Southern Cross (1984, Musicaa)
- Kaminari no Densetsu Shuu (1984–1985, Shuuichi Yamamura)
- Touch (1985–1987, Minami Asakura)
- City Hunter (1987–1988, Megumi)
- Tsuide ni Tonchinkan (1987–1988, Amago Shirai)
- Anime Sanjushi (1987–1989, Constance)
- City Hunter 2 (1988–1989, Mitsuko Shimizu)
- Patlabor (1989–1994, Prince Uru)
- Parasol Henbē (1989–1991, Megeru)
- The Adventures of Peter Pan (1989, Peter Pan)
- T.P. Pon (1989, Yumiko Yasugawa)
- Ranma ½ (1989–1992, Akane Tendo, Kanna)
- Nadia: The Secret of Blue Water (1990–1991, Jean Roque Raltique)
- Ochame na Futago: Kurea Gakuin Monogatari (1991, Patricia Sullivan)
- Honō no Tōkyūji: Dodge Danpei (1991–1992, Danpei Ichigeki)
- Aoki Densetsu Shoot! (1993–1994, Kazumi Endō)
- Akazukin Chacha (1994–1995, Shiine)
- Omakase Scrappers (1994–1995, Sayuri Tachibana)
- Soar High! Isami (1995–1996, Sōshi Yukimi)
- Harimogu Harley (1996–1997, Harley)
- Rurouni Kenshin (1996–1998, Seta Sōjirō)
- Bakusō Kyōdai Let's & Go!! MAX (1998, Retsuya Ichimonji)
- Pocket Monsters (1999, Kaoruko)
- Zoids: Guardian Force (1999–2000, Riize)
- Ojarumaru (1998-ongoing, Bispaniora-go)
- One Piece (1999-ongoing, Belle-Mère)
- Inuyasha (2000–2004, 2009–2010, Kikyō)
- Rockman EXE (2002–2003, Ms. Mariko Ōzono, Shuryou)
- Sonic X (2003–2004, Helen)
- Di Gi Charat Nyo! (2003–2004, Di Gi Charat's Mama)
- Rockman EXE AXESS (2003–2004, Ms. Mariko Ōzono, Yuriko Ōzono)
- Croket! (2003–2005, Anchovie)
- Rockman EXE Stream (2004–2005, Ms. Mariko Ōzono, Yuriko Ōzono)
- Samurai Champloo (2004–2005, Yatsuha)
- Major (2004, Chiaki Honda)
- Nanami-chan (2004, Yōko Aoba)
- The Snow Queen (2005–2006, Nina)
- Death Note (2007, Near)
- Chi's Sweet Home (2008–2009, Mom)
- Star Driver (2010, Fujino Yō)
- Suite PreCure (2011–2012, Aphrodite)
- Pretty Rhythm Aurora Dream (2011–2012, Omi Harune / Bear-chi)
- Detective Conan (2012, Masumi Sera)
- Hunter × Hunter (second series) (2012, Shalnark)
- Psycho-Pass (2012, Dominator's voice)
- Love Live School Idol Project (Principal Minami / Kotori's mom)
- Wake Up, Girls! (2014–2018, Junko Tange)
- Seiyu's Life! (2015, Herself)
- Garo: Guren no Tsuki (2015–2016, Izumi Shikibu)
- Little Witch Academia (2017, Shiny Chariot / Professor Ursula)
- Pop Team Epic (2018, Pipimi (Episode 1-A))
- Shinya! Tensai Bakabon (2018, Bakabon's mother)
- Bermuda Triangle: Colorful Pastrale (2019, Arudi)
- Mix (2019, narrator)
- Symphogear XV (2019, Shem-Ha Mephorash)
- Oda Cinnamon Nobunaga (2020, Ichiko's mother)
- Keep Your Hands Off Eizouken! (2020, Tsubame's mother)
- Higurashi: When They Cry – Gou (2021, Eua)
- Jujutsu Kaisen (2021-present, Yuki Tsukumo)
- Komi Can't Communicate (2021–2022, narrator)
- The Apothecary Diaries (2023, Fengming)
- Ranma ½ (2024, Akane Tendō)
- Witch Watch (2025, Riro Takumi)
- Turkey! Time to Strike (2025, Sumomo)
- Draw This, Then Die! (2026, Pokota)

=== Original video animations (OVAs) ===
- Salamander (1988, Stephanie)
- Gunbuster (1988, Noriko Takaya)
- Baoh (1989, Sumire)
- Blazing Transfer Student (1991, Yukari Takamura)
- Spirit of Wonder: Chaina-san no Yūutsu (1992, China)
- The Hakkenden (1993–1995, Shinbei Inue)
- Ranma ½ (1993–2008, Akane Tendō)
- Special Duty Combat Unit Shinesman (1996, Riko Hidaka / Shinesman Salmon Pink)
- Spirit of Wonder (2001, China)
- Sakura Wars: Ecole de Paris (2003, Erica Fontaine)
- Sakura Wars: Le Nouveau Paris (2003, Erica Fontaine)
- Little Witch Academia (2013, Shiny Chariot / Professor Ursula)

=== Films ===
- Touch: Sebangō no Nai Ace (1986, Minami Asakura)
- Touch 2: Sayonara no Okurimono (1986, Minami Asakura)
- Doraemon: Nobita and the Knights on Dinosaurs (1987, Low)
- Touch 3: Kimi ga Tōri Sugita Ato ni (1987, Minami Asakura)
- My Neighbor Totoro (1988, Satsuki Kusakabe)
- Nadia: The Motion Picture (1991, Jean Roque Raltique)
- Ranma ½: Big Trouble in Nekonron, China (1991, Akane Tendo)
- Ranma ½: Nihao, My Concubine (1992, Akane Tendo)
- Ranma ½: Super Indiscriminate Decisive Battle! Team Ranma vs. the Legendary Phoenix (1994, Akane Tendo)
- Galaxy Express 999: Eternal Fantasy (1998, Iselle)
- Hunter × Hunter (1998, Kurapika)
- Touch: Miss Lonely Yesterday (1998, Minami Asakura)
- Touch: Cross Road (2001, Minami Asakura)
- Inuyasha the Movie: Affections Touching Across Time (2001, Kikyo)
- Inuyasha the Movie: The Castle Beyond the Looking Glass (2002, Kikyo)
- Pokémon: Destiny Deoxys (2004, Tory Lund)
- Inuyasha the Movie: Fire on the Mystic Island (2004, Kikyo)
- Pokémon: Lucario and the Mystery of Mew (2005, Mother)
- Gunbuster vs. Diebuster (2006, Noriko Takaya)
- Detective Conan: Dimensional Sniper (2014, Masumi Sera)
- Psycho-Pass: The Movie (2015, Dominator's voice)
- Love Live! The School Idol Movie – Principal Minami/Kotori's mom
- Little Witch Academia: The Enchanted Parade (2015, Professor Ursula)
- Detective Conan: The Scarlet Bullet (2021, Masumi Sera)
- My Oni Girl (2024, Shion)
- Crayon Shin-chan the Movie: Super Hot! The Spicy Kasukabe Dancers (2025, Sugoicube)

=== Dubbing roles ===
==== Live-action ====
- Jayma Mays
  - Glee – Emma Pillsbury
  - The Smurfs – Grace Winslow
  - The Smurfs 2 – Grace Winslow
- 9-1-1 – Maddie Buckley Kendall (Jennifer Love Hewitt)
- The Birdcage (2000 Fuji TV edition) – Barbara Keeley (Calista Flockhart)
- Charlie and the Chocolate Factory (2008 NTV edition) – Augustus Gloop (Philip Wiegratz)
- Clifford the Big Red Dog – Maggie Howard (Sienna Guillory)
- Edge of Darkness – Emma Craven (Joanne Whalley)
- Eighteen, Twenty-Nine – Yoo Hye-chan (Park Sun-young)
- Elementary – Tara Parker (Sutton Foster)
- Kingpin – Rebecca (Michele Matheson)
- The Last of the Mohicans (2001 Fuji TV edition) – Cora Munro (Madeleine Stowe)
- Link – Jane Chase (Elisabeth Shue)
- Moms' Night Out – Allyson (Sarah Drew)
- Monrak Transistor – Sadao (Siriyakorn Pukkavesh)
- Night Watch (1999 Fuji TV edition) – Myra Tang (Irene Ng)
- Shane (2016 Star Channel edition) – Marian Starrett (Jean Arthur)
- Super Mario Bros. – Daisy (Samantha Mathis)
- Weekend at Bernie's – Gwen Saunders (Catherine Mary Stewart)

==== Animation ====
- The Garfield Movie – Ethel
- The Iron Giant – Annie Hughes
- Miffy the Movie – Mother Bunny
- The Oz Kids – Dot Hugson (Until episode 23 before changing by Sayuri Ikemoto)

== Video games ==
- Wonder Project J: Kikai no Shōnen Pīno (1994) (Pīno)
- Grandia (1997) (Feena)
- Black Matrix (1998) (Domina)
- Yukiwari no Hana (1998) (Kaori Sakuragi)
- Inuyasha (2001) (Kikyō)
- Rumble Roses (2005) (Reiko Hinomoto / Rowdy Reiko)
- Rumble Roses XX (2006) (Reiko Hinomoto / Rowdy Reiko)
- Project X Zone (2012) (Erica Fontaine)
- Project X Zone 2 (2015) (Erica Fontaine)
- Root Letter (2016) (Aya Fumino)
- Little Witch Academia: Chamber of Time (2017) (Ursula Callistis / Shiny Chariot)
- Our World is Ended (2019) (Nichol Shorter)
- Fate/Grand Order (2020) (Aphrodite)
- Final Fantasy VII Remake (2020) (Claudia Strife)
- Senjin Aleste (2021) (Wise-N)
- Super Monkey Ball Banana Mania (2021) (AiAi, MeeMee, Baby, YanYan)
- Girls Frontline 2 : Exilium (2024) (Peritya, Caldwel Scarlett)

Unknown date

- Aoi Shiro (Syouko)
- Croquette! 2: Yami no Bank to Ban Joō (Anchovie)
- Croquette! 3: Guranyū Ōkoku no Nazo (Anchovie)
- Croquette! Great: Jikū no Bōken-tachi (Anchovie)
- Croquette! DS: Tenkū no Yūsha-tachi (Anchovie, Sardine)
- Evil Zone (aka Eretzvaju) (Midori Himeno)
- Minna no Golf Portable (Sagiri)
- Idol Janshi Suchie Pai (series) (Kotori Ninomiya)
- Neon Genesis Evangelion: Battle Orchestra (Noriko Takaya)
- Panther Bandit (Kasumi)
- Puyo Puyo CD (Panotti)
- Puyo Puyo CD Tsū (Panotti)
- Ranma ½ (Akane Tendo)
- Rurouni Kenshin: Enjō! Kyoto Rinne (Sojiro Seta)
- Sakura Wars (series) (Erica Fontaine)
- Super Robot Wars (series) (Noriko Takaya, Mina Likering, Lenii Ai, Makibi Hari)
- Tales of the World: Narikiri Dungeon 2 (Thanatos)
- Tengai Makyou III: Namida (Iyo)
- TwinBee RPG (Molte)
- Ultima: Kyōfu no Exodus (game character introduction voice)
- VitaminR (Board Chairman)
- Wonder Project J2: Koruro no Mori no Josette (Josette)
- Zoids vs. (Atorē Arcadia, Riize)

== TV shows ==
=== Regular appearances ===
- Bakeruno Shōgakkō Hyūdoro-gumi
- Battle Fever J – Keiko Nakahara
- Cool Japan – Narrator
- Let's Go Young
- Minna Ikiteiru
- Ohayou Studio
- Shin Afternoon Show 1987
- Tamiya RC Car Gran Prix
- Zawa Zawa Mori no Ganko-chan
- Ressha Sentai ToQger – Miiss Glitta/Empress of Darkness Glitta
- Ressha Sentai ToQger the Movie: Galaxy Line S.O.S. Miiss Glitta
- Koe Girl! (2018) – Mari Kikuchi
- Kamen Rider Zero-One – That

=== Guest appearances ===
- Quiz Nattoku Rekishikan (xxxx)
- Run Run Asa 6-sei Jōhō (xxxx)
- Sumai no 110-ban (xxxx)
- Tochūgesha Junjō (xxxx)
- Voice II (2021)

== Radio ==
- Asakura Minami no All Night Nippon – September 29, 2004
- Clair de Lune (Banana Fritters)
- Earth Conscious Dream
- Hidaka Noriko no Happy @
- Hidaka Noriko no Tokyo Wonder Jam: Uri! Uri! Urihō!
- KBS Kyoto Hyper Night
  - Hidaka Noriko no Aromatic Night
  - Hidaka Noriko no Hyper Night Getsuyōbi
  - Hidaka Noriko no Hyper Night Kinyōbi
- Nisseki Doyō Omoshiro Radio
- Nonko to Nobita no Anime Scramble
- Nonko's Cheerful Mind "Urara"
- Saturday Tokimeki Station
- Shōfukutei Tsuruko no All Night Nippon

== Theatrical roles ==
- Play a Song
- Sakura Taisen Dinner Show (Erica Fontaine)
- Sakura Taisen Kayō Show (Erica Fontaine)
- The Star Spangled Girl

== CDs ==
=== Albums ===
- Breath of Air
- Hidaka Noriko Best
- Kazumi (as Kazumi Endō)
- Mega Babe
- Minami no Seishun
- Minamikaze ni Fukarete
- Nonko
- Otakara Song Book
- Paradise
- Personal
- Personal 2
- Ranma ½ Utagoyomi Heisei 3 Nendoban (as Akane Tendo, includes Yasashii, ii Ko ni Narenai (a.k.a. the "Baka Song"))
- Time Capsule
- Touch in Memory (as Minami Asakura)

=== Singles ===
- Anata ga Uchū ～By My Side～
- Ashita he no Tsubasa / Niji no Kanata
- Be Natural / Megami ga Kureta Ichibyō
- Watashi Datte (as Kazumi Endō)

== Books ==
- Nonko (ISBN 4-07-225667-6)
