= Design of Royal Space Force: The Wings of Honnêamise =

Design of the 1987 anime film

Gainax's 1987 debut work Royal Space Force: The Wings of Honnêamise has been particularly noted for its design work; during a 2021 interview with the New York Times, science fiction author Ted Chiang, whose Nebula Award-winning "Story of Your Life" was the basis for the Denis Villeneuve movie Arrival, cited Royal Space Force as the single most impressive example of worldbuilding in book or film. Chiang remarked on details such as the film's distinct depiction of money, television, and newspapers: "I just really was impressed by the way that the animators for that film, they invented an entirely new physical culture for this movie. The movie is not about those things, but they really fleshed out this alternate world just as the backdrop for the story that they wanted to tell."

Although Royal Space Force had been green-lit based in large part on the content of a short 1985 "pilot film" version depicting a summary of the story's plot events, writer and director Hiroyuki Yamaga decided afterwards to "destroy" the work the pilot film represented and start over when making the full-length feature film version, in pursuit of a different kind of worldbuilding and character design. This process, described variously as having taken from a year to as much as two years, involved as many as 20 design staff, including art students from outside the anime industry working on the film part-time. This re-design extended beyond the objects depicted in the film to its characters as well, with Yoshiyuki Sadamoto, later to become known for his character designs on the popular anime Nadia: The Secret of Blue Water, Neon Genesis Evangelion, and FLCL designing for Royal Space Force main characters who were recognized at the time as having an atypical look for anime protagonists.

Shinji Higuchi, who in 2017 would share the Director of the Year award with Hideaki Anno for Shin Godzilla at the Japan Academy Film Prize ceremony reflected on both the problems and the personal influence on his career of Royal Space Force's design process, which he coordinated as an assistant director on the film. Higuchi recalled the work as having been done in a "horribly inefficient" manner, where far more production time was spent on designing tableware than on animating the climactic rocket launch, yet he regarded the experience as having left him with the "vital asset" of thinking that any obstacles to a production could be overcome through continuing to move ever forward with passion, a philosophy he remarked that he still believed in as a creator.

== Design ==
=== Starting over from the pilot film ===
In December 1984, Gainax had set up their first studio as a newly incorporated company in the Takadanobaba neighborhood of Shinjuku to produce a short "pilot film" version of Royal Space Force, with the aim of convincing Bandai to support the making the project as a full-length feature film. After the successful presentation of the pilot film to Bandai in April 1985, Gainax moved their operations to another location in Takadanobaba that offered twice the space of their previous studio, where the existing staff gathered in friends and acquaintances to help visualize the setting of Royal Space Force. Among those joining the crew at this time were two of the film's most prolific world designers: Takashi Watabe, whose designs would include the train station, rocket factory, and Royal Space Force lecture hall and Yoichi Takizawa, whose contributions included the rocket launch gantry, space capsule simulator, and rocket engine test facility.

Yamaga decided that the imagery of the alternate world depicted in the pilot film did not have the kind of different realism he was hoping to achieve in the feature film version. Rather than use the design work of the pilot as a foundation for the full-length anime, it was decided to "destroy" the world of the pilot film and start over again, creating a new series of "image board" paintings to visualize the look of Royal Space Force. The total worldbuilding process went on for roughly a year, and was described as a converse process between Yamaga and the gradually assembled team of designers; expressing his ideas into concrete terms, but also bringing their concrete skills to bear toward the expression of abstract ideas. (Note: A chronology of the film's production published in 1987 listed the process of developing Yamaga's abstract ideas into the actual visual designs used in the film as having taken "about a year". Yamaga however in a 1997 interview described the process as having taken two years.) Yamaga reflected in 2007 that this reciprocal process influenced his writing on the film: "My style is not 'I have a story I created, so you help me make it.' Creators come first, and this is a story I created thinking what story those creators would shine at the most."

=== Character design ===
In the decade following Royal Space Force, the Sadamoto-designed Nadia La Arwall and Rei Ayanami would each twice win the Anime Grand Prix fan poll for favorite female character; Sadamoto's Shinji Ikari would also win twice for favorite male character. By contrast, his male and female leads designed for Royal Space Force, Shirotsugh and Riquinni, ranked ninth and twentieth respectively for their categories in the Grand Prix poll of 1987 releases. In a roundtable discussion on Royal Space Force following its release, it was pointed out that neither Shirotsugh nor Riquinni look like typical anime lead characters. Yamaga remarked in his 2007 retrospective that, "One of the changes you can easily see from the pilot version is the character modeling of the protagonist. He used to look like a boy, but has become like a middle-aged man. As you can see in Evangelion later on, characters that Yoshiyuki Sadamoto creates are more attractive when they look young. But of course, he's really skilled, so even if he challenges the area that's not his specialty, he can give us what we're asking for."

Sadamoto in fact did use for the final version of Shirotsugh a model reference significantly older than the 21-year old character's age, the American actor Treat Williams, although the character designer remarked that Yamaga's instructions to make the face square and the eyebrows thicker had him thinking the redesign would look like the director himself. As a reference for Manna, Yamaga referred Sadamoto to actress Tatum O'Neal as she appeared in the first half of the film Paper Moon. Takami Akai remarked that "Sadamoto drew Manna so perfectly that we were sort of intimidated," adding she was "a sidekick who brought out the darker aspects" of Riquinni. Regarding Riquinni herself, Sadamoto commented in 1987 that there seemed to be a model for her, but Yamaga did not tell him who it was. In a 2018 interview session with Niigata University, Yamaga remarked, "What I see now is surprisingly the character Riquinni is nothing but me. At any rate, Shirotsugh is not me. If you ask me where I would position myself in the film, I would identify myself as Riquinni in many aspects, in terms of the way I think. I was probably someone weird [and] religious, ever since my childhood." (Note: Yamaga noted that he personally drew the tract that Riquinni is seeking to give to passersby at the end of the film. Akai suggested to Yamaga that in deciding to go to space, Shirotsugh "deep down inside thinks that he has done [this] for" Riquinni, and comes to realize "there's a part of her in him", yet at the end Riquinni herself now has doubts about the mission, and can no longer give her wholehearted support to Shirotsugh. Yamaga agreed with this interpretation.) The appearance of several minor characters in Royal Space Force was based on Gainax staff members or crew on the film, including Nekkerout (Takeshi Sawamura), the Republic aide who plans Shirotsugh's assassination (Fumio Iida), and the director who suggests what Shiro should say before he walks out of his TV interview (Hiroyuki Kitakubo).

Commenting on the character designs in Royal Space Force, Sadamoto remarked that in truth they more reflected the tastes of Gainax than his own personal ones, although at the same time, as the artist, his taste must be reflected in them somehow. Sadamoto discussed the issue in terms of anime character design versus manga character design: "Manga can afford such strong and weird characters, but it's difficult to make good moving characters out of them in anime. The moment I draw a character, for example, you can see how it is going to behave, really ... but I was asking myself what I should be doing. 'Should I make their facial expressions more like those you see in a typical anime?' and so on. I feel that the audience reaction was pretty good, or at least that I managed to get a passing grade."

=== Design process and philosophy ===
On the premise that the real world itself was a product of mixed design, Yamaga believed that the sense of alternate reality in Royal Space Force would be strengthened by inviting as many designers as possible to participate in the anime. By September, the worldbuilding of Royal Space Force proceeded forward by a system where designers were free to draw and submit visual concepts based on their interpretation of Yamaga's script; the concept art would then be discussed at a daily liaison meeting between Yamaga and the other staff. Yamaga used "keywords" given to the designers as a starting point for the film's world building; the words were divided into what he termed "symbolic" and "non-symbolic" categories. The director sought to avoid "symbolic" premises where possible; as an example of the difference, Yamaga stated that a "symbolic" way to describe a "cup" would be to call it a "cylindrical object", whereas he preferred the designers start from "non-symbolic" terms that described a cup's function or sensory impressions from use, such as "it holds water," or "it's cold and sweats when filled with water." Yamaga expressed a concern, however, that relying entirely on this "non-symbolic" approach would have risked making the designs into "abstract paintings," and so decided to retain a certain degree of "symbolic" information in the keywords.

Assistant director Shinji Higuchi had overall responsibility for coordinating the design work with Yamaga's intentions through overseeing the output of its multiple designers. Higuchi gave the example of spoons to describe the design process: he would converse with a group of art students doing part-time design work on the film and consider the shape of the human mouth, the material of the spoon, the structure of its handle, and so forth. Higuchi joked that in this way they spent two months on designing Riquinni's tableware and had only one week to animate the rocket launch, yet those were the priorities. He described the time management on the film as a "mess" and the work as "horribly inefficient" with a sense that there was no end in sight to their endeavors, and yet Higuchi considered the experience to have left him with a "vital asset" as an artist, giving him the "passion to break down all the obstacles that stand in the way of creating something...It's beautiful to have the attitude of 'just keep moving forward'...Maybe there's a smarter way of doing things, but in my case, because I first experienced Royal Space Force: The Wings of Honnêamise, I can't go back."

Higuchi noted moreover that the film's main mecha were designed in a collaborative fashion, citing as an example the Honnêamise air force plane, for which Sadamoto first created a rough sketch, then Takizawa finished up its shape, with its final touches added by Anno. Although his aim was to give a unified look to the kingdom of Honnêamise as the film's main setting, Higuchi also attempted to take care to make it neither too integrated nor too disjointed, remarking that just as the present day world is made from a mixing of different cultures, this would have also been true of a past environment such as the alternate 1950s world of Honnêamise. Yamaga commented that the film also portrayed the idea that different levels of technology are present in a world at the same time depending upon particular paths of development, such as the color TV in use by the Republic, or the air combat between jet and prop planes at the end, which Yamaga compared to similar engagements during the Korean War.

A deliberate exception to Royal Space Force's general design approach was the rocket itself, which was adapted from a real-world Soviet model. This exception was later noticed by Hayao Miyazaki, for whom it formed one of his two criticisms of the anime; (Note: Miyazaki's other criticism involved the way Yamaga presented the relationship between the older and younger generations working on the spaceflight project. Miyazaki in fact made frequent reference to the design of the film's rocket as having a NASA look, even after Yamaga stated to him that the inspiration for the rocket was from the Soviet space program rather than from NASA.) he was surprised that a film which had gone so far as to change the shape of money did not make the rocket more unusual. (Note: Anno suggested that the tall, cylindrical look of the Space Race-era rockets he had grown up watching on TV would by itself seem somewhat exotic to contemporary high school audiences in 1987, who associated human spaceflight with the appearance of the Space Shuttle. On the choice of using either an early US or Soviet rocket as a model for the Royal Space Force launcher, Anno explained that he chose the Soviet because it was novel to him personally, and because he felt the Vostok's use of boosters that separated horizontally (rather than vertically as with American rockets of the period) would create more visual interest. An aesthetic touch Anno added to the final rocket design was its copper appearance, which was inspired by the Japanese 10 yen coin.) Yamaga argued that although the anime reaches its eventual conclusion through a process of different design paths, it was necessary to end the film with a rocket inspired by reality, lest the audience see it as a story about a different world that has nothing to do with them. In their roundtable discussion with OUT, Yamaga described the rocket as also emblematic of the film's approach to mecha; despite its many mecha designs, they all play supporting roles, and even the rocket is not treated as a "lead character".
