= Karaoke Crazies =

2016 South Korean film by Kim Sang-chan

- Theatrical release poster
- Hangul: 중독노래방
- RR: Jungdok noraebang
- MR: Chungdok noraebang
- Directed by: Kim Sang-chan
- Written by: Park Ji-hong
- Produced by: Hwang Phil-seon
- Starring: Lee Moon-sik
- Cinematography: Jang U-young
- Edited by: Moon In-dae
- Music by: Lee Hyo-jeong
- Production companies: Aram Pictures; Redhill Pictures
- Distributed by: Little Big Pictures
- Release dates: March 12, 2016 (SXSW); June 15, 2017 (South Korea)
- Running time: 106 minutes
- Country: South Korea
- Language: Korean
- Box office: US$60,327

Karaoke Crazies is a 2016 South Korean fantasy comedy-drama film directed by Kim Sang-chan.

== Cast ==
- Lee Moon-sik as Sung-wook
- Bae So-eun as Ha-sook
- Kim Na-mi as Na-joo
- Bang Jun-ho as Birthmark
- Myung Kye-nam as Tweezers
- Jung Seung-gil as Police officer
- Park Seon-woo as Killer
- Kim Si-eun as Sung-wook's wife
- Park Ye-won as Min-ji
