= Lee Moon-sik =

South Korean actor

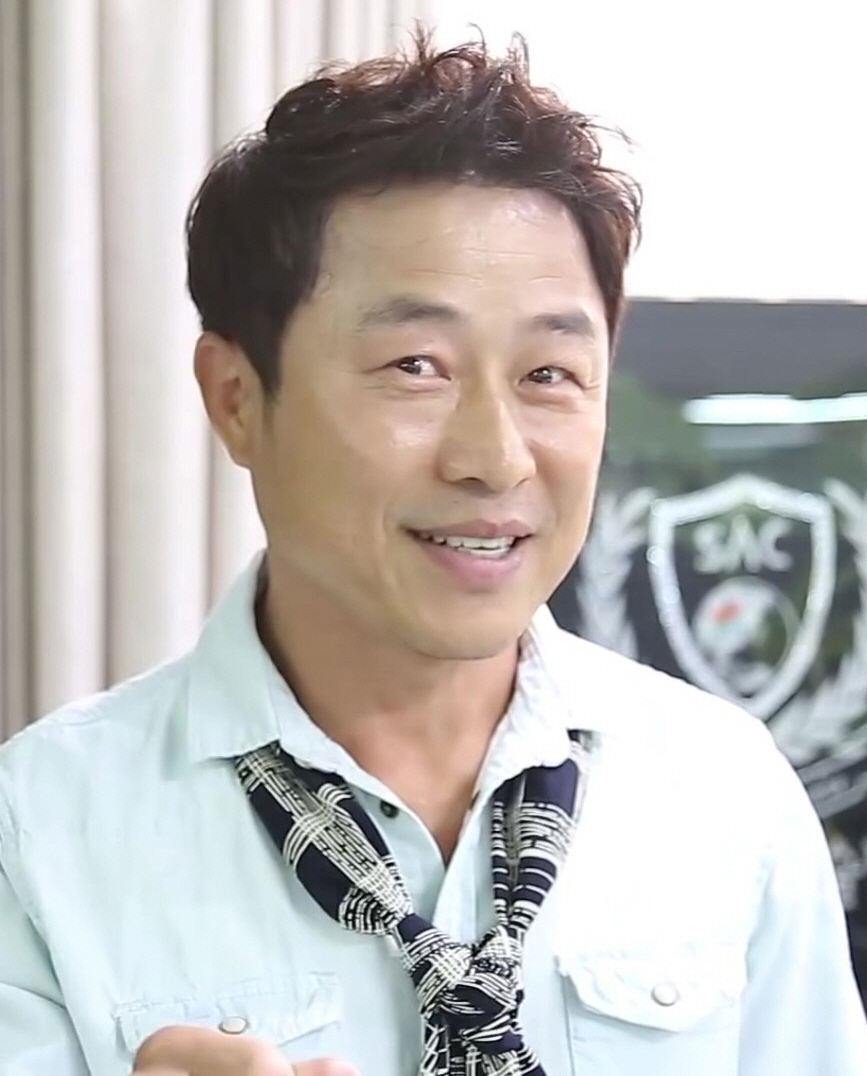
- Lee in 2015
- Born: November 13, 1967 (age 58); Sunchang, North Jeolla Province, South Korea
- Other name: Lee Mun-shik
- Education: Hanyang University
- Occupation: Actor
- Years active: 1996–present

Korean name
- Hangul: 이문식
- Hanja: 李文植
- RR: I Munsik
- MR: I Munsik

Lee Moon-sik (born November 13, 1967) is a South Korean actor. Lee Moon-sik debuted in Jang Jin films of the late 1990s after an illustrious career in Daehak-ro (considered the "Korean Broadway"), where he learned great comic timing, ad-lib prowess, and dramatic acting. He has since become one of South Korea's most prolific supporting actors, appearing in numerous films and television series throughout his career. Among Lee's leading roles are in Mapado, The 101st Proposal, Detective Mr. Gong, A Bloody Aria, Fly, Daddy, Fly, and Here He Comes.

== Filmography ==
=== Film ===
Year	Title	Role	Notes/Ref.
1995	Millions in My Account	Dal-soo's friend 2	
1996	Love Story	young man in video shop	
1996	Ambiguous Man	taxi driver	
1997	Green Fish	thug on train	
1997	Beat	Ward Office staff	
1997	Bad Movie	convenience store owner	
1999	The Spy	flimsy taxi robber	
2000	Happy Funeral Director	Ma Seong-goo	
2001	Last Present	Yeong-man	
2001	One Fine Spring Day	recording studio senior	
2001	Hi! Dharma!	Monk Dae-bong	
2002	Public Enemy	Lee Ahn-soo	
2002	No Blood No Tears	middle-aged drunk	
2002	Make It Big	thief	
2002	No Comment Family	art teacher / station attendant	
2002	Break Out	steamer	
2002	Lovers' Concerto	sleeping man on the bus	
2003	The First Amendment of Korea	Baek Seong-ki	
2003	Mr. Butterfly	Do-cheol	
2003	Reversal of Fortune	Ma Kang-sung	
2003	Oh! Brothers	Squad leader Jeong	
2003	Once Upon a Time in a Battlefield	Geoshigi	
2004	Who's Got the Tape?	Desperate (Detective Park)	
2004	The Big Swindle	Eol-mae	
2004	Hi! Dharma 2: Showdown in Seoul	Monk Dae-bong	
2005	Another Public Enemy	Ahn-soo	
2005	Mapado	Na Chung-soo	
2006	Art of Fighting	Martial Arts Master	(special appearance)
2006	Detective Mr. Gong	Detective Gong Pil-doo	
2006	A Bloody Aria	Bong-yeon	
2006	Fly, Daddy, Fly	Jang Ga-pil	
2007	Mapado 2: Back to the Island	Na Chung-soo	
2007	Bank Attack	Bae Ki-ro	
2008	Public Enemy Returns	Ahn Soo	
2008	Baby and I	subway attendant	(special appearance)
2008	Romantic Island	Joong-sik	
2010	Looking for My Wife	Yu Kwak	
2011	Battlefield Heroes	Geoshigi	
2011	Late Blossom	Scratch	
2011	Miracle	Jo Duk-soo	
2012	Miss Conspirator	Sa Yeong-cheol	
2012	Two Weddings and a Funeral	priest	(cameo)
2012	The Grand Heist	Mr. Yang	(cameo)
2014	One Day My First Love Came In	pickpocket	(cameo)
2014	Big Deal (Hantang)		
2015	Goodbye and Hello	Guitar bag	(cameo)
2016	Proof of Innocence	Red Nametag	(cameo)
2016	Karaoke Crazies	Sung-wook	
2018	Gate	Cheol-soo	
2018	Memento Mori	detective	(cameo)
2018	The Negotiation	Capt. Jung	(cameo)
2021	Night in Paradise	S.U Park	(cameo)
2022	Birth	Jo Shin-cheol	
2023	The Assassin	Lee Bang	

=== Television series ===
Year	Title	Role	Notes/Ref.
2000	Tough Guy's Love (Kkokji)	Trafficker	
2003	Forever Love	Nam Cheol-ho	
2003	Damo	Ma Chook-ji	
2006	The 101st Proposal	Park Dal-jae	
2007	War of Money	Boss of securities company	
2008	Iljimae	Soe-dol	
2008	Here He Comes	Father	
2009	The Slingshot	Park Moon-ho	
2009	Queen Seondeok	Jook-bang	
2010	Giant	Park So-tae	
2011	The Duo	Jang Kkok-ji	
2011	Glory Jane	Heo Young-do	
2012	Rooftop Prince	Pyo Taek-soo	
2012	Ji Woon-soo's Stroke of Luck	Company president Baek	
2012	The Great Seer	Hong Jong-dae	
2012	Sangkwoni (Business District)	Sang-kwon	Drama Special
2012	Blue Tower	Lee Moon-sik	Special appearance
2013	Incarnation of Money	Park So-tae	Cameo, ep 9
2013	Empress Ki	Bang Shin-woo	
2014	Steal Heart	Han Man-bok	
2014	Discovery of Love	Taxi driver	Cameo
2014	Mr. Back	Sung Kyung-bae	
2014	Healer	Ko Sung-chul	Cameo, ep 1
2015	Stay Still	Park Chan-soo	Drama Special
2015	The Man in the Mask	Jang Ho-sik	
2015	My Mom	Heo Sang-soon	
2016	Moorim School: Saga of the Brave	Shim Bong-san	
2016	Come Back Mister	Pilot	
2016	The Royal Gambler	Baek Man-geum	
2016	Wanted	Choi Joon-goo	
2016	Love in the Moonlight	Eom-gong	Cameo, ep 1
2017	Judge vs. Judge	Oh Ji-rak	
2018	Yeonnam-dong 539	Jordan	
2018	The Undateables	Yoo Seung-ryul	
2018	Big Forest	Man-soo	Cameo
2019	The Fiery Priest	Ki Yong-moon	
2019	The Secret Life of My Secretary	Goo Seok-chan's face that Do Min-ik saw wrong	
2019	The Tale of Nokdu	Hwang Jang-gun	
2022	The Empire	Jang Il	

=== Web series ===
Year	Title	Role	Ref.
2021	Move to Heaven	Park Ju-taek	
2022	Rookie Cops	Go Yang-chul	
2022	A Model Family	Gang Wook	
2022	Rose Mansion	Choi Pyo-chang	
2022	Big Bet	Park Jong-hyun	

=== Television shows ===
Year	Title	Role	Ref.
2021	Dinga Dinga	Host	
2022	Romantic Doctor Im Chae-moo	Host	

== Awards ==
- 2013 Seoul International Drama Awards: Best Actor (Sangkwoni)
- 2011 Golden Cinematography Awards: Most Popular Actor (Battlefield Heroes)
- 2008 SBS Drama Awards: Best Supporting Actor in a Drama Special (Iljimae)
- 2008 MBC Entertainment Awards: Top Excellence Award, Actor in a Comedy/Sitcom (Here He Comes)
- 2004 Korean Film Awards: Best Supporting Actor (The Big Swindle)
