= Ranma ½ (1989 TV series) =

Japanese anime television series

Cover of the first North American DVD box set by Viz Media

Ranma ½ (らんま1/2) is a Japanese anime series adapted from the manga of the same name by Rumiko Takahashi. It was created by Studio Deen and aired weekly between April 15, 1989, and September 16, 1989, on Fuji TV before being canceled after 18 episodes due to low ratings. Shortly after, the series was reworked by most of the same staff, retitled Ranma ½ Nettōhen (らんま1/2 熱闘編), and launched in a different time slot, running between October 20, 1989, and September 25, 1992, for 143 episodes.

Three movies were produced, The Battle of Nekonron, China! A Battle to Defy the Rules! on November 2, 1991; Battle at Togenkyo! Get Back the Brides on August 1, 1992; and Super Indiscriminate Decisive Battle! Team Ranma vs. the Legendary Phoenix on August 20, 1994. The first two movies are feature length, but the third was originally aired in theaters with two other movies: Ghost Sweeper Mikami and Heisei Dog Stories: Bow. Following the ending of the TV series, 12 OVA episodes were released directly to home video, the earliest on December 7, 1993, and the twelfth on October 20, 2010. In celebration of Rumiko Takahashi's 35th anniversary as a manga artist, the TV series was released on Blu-ray for the first time in three box sets between May 24, 2013, and January 24, 2014.

Viz Media licensed both anime, the films and the first 11 OVAs for English dubs in North America. They labeled both anime as one series and first released it on subtitled and dubbed VHS, later combining it into seven DVD collections they call "seasons". Besides changing the ordering of many of the anime episodes, Viz also added the third film to their set of the OVAs. They began re-releasing the show on Blu-ray and DVD in 2014. Madman Entertainment released part of the anime series and the first two movies in Australasia, before their license expired, and MVM Films released the first two movies in the United Kingdom.

== Series overview ==
Season	Episodes	Originally released	
Season	Episodes	First released	Last released
1	18	April 15, 1989	September 16, 1989
2	22	October 20, 1989	April 13, 1990
3	23	April 20, 1990	September 21, 1990
4	24	October 5, 1990	March 29, 1991
5	25	April 5, 1991	September 20, 1991
6	24	September 27, 1991	April 3, 1992
7	25	April 10, 1992	September 25, 1992

== Episode list ==
A note on the "Season" nomenclature:

The "seasons" that comprise the following list correspond to the box sets released in North America by Viz Media, which combined both the first Ranma ½ anime and Ranma ½ Nettōhen (らんま½ 熱闘編) into one series and changed the order of many episodes. In Japan, each Ranma ½ anime was aired continuously, with regular pre-emptions for sporting events and television specials, and not split into standard seasonal cycles. The new Viz releases issued throughout 2014 and 2015 come in revised sets that are compiled in original production order and contain 23 episodes per set.

=== Season 1 "Digital Dojo" (1989) ===
No. overall	No. in season	Title	Directed by	Written by	Storyboarded by	Animation directed by	Original release date
1	1	"Here's Ranma" "The Strange Stranger from China"; Transliteration: "Chūgoku kara Kita Aitsu! Chotto Hen!!" (Japanese: 中国からきたあいつ!ちょっとヘン!!)	Tomomi Mochizuki	Yoshio Urasawa	Tomomi Mochizuki	Atsuko Nakajima	April 15, 1989
2	2	"School Is No Place for Horsing Around"; Transliteration: "Asobi Janai no Yo Gakkō wa" (Japanese: 遊びじゃないのよ学校は)	Takeshi Mori	Yoshio Urasawa	Takeshi Mori	Masako Gotō	April 22, 1989
3	3	"A Sudden Storm of Love"; Transliteration: "Ikinari Ai no Arashi Chotto Matte Yo" (Japanese: いきなり愛の嵐ちょっと待ってョ)	Yamauchi Shigeyasu	Hashimoto Hiroshi	Yamauchi Shigeyasu	Asami Endo	April 29, 1989
4	4	"Ranma and... Ranma? If It's Not One Thing, It's Another"; Transliteration: "Ranma to Ranma? Gokai ga Tomaranai" (Japanese: 乱馬とらんま?誤解がとまらない)	Tomomi Mochizuki	Hashimoto Hiroshi	Tomomi Mochizuki	Atsuko Nakajima	May 6, 1989
5	5	"Love Me to the Bone! The Compound Fracture of Akane's Heart"; Transliteration: "Kotsu Made Aishite? Akane Koi no Fukuzatsu Kossetsu" (Japanese: 骨まで愛して?あかね恋の複雑骨折)	Kazuhiro Furuhashi	Yoshio Urasawa	Tamiko Kojima	Masako Gotō	May 13, 1989
6	6	"Akane's Lost Love... These Things Happen, You Know"; Transliteration: "Akane no Shitsuren Datte Shōganai Janai" (Japanese: あかねの失恋だってしょうがないじゃない)	Shinji Takagi	Hashimoto Hiroshi	Tomomi Mochizuki	Asami Endo	May 20, 1989
7	7	"Enter Ryoga! The Eternal 'Lost Boy'"; Transliteration: "Tōjō! Eien no Mayoigo - Ryōga" (Japanese: 登場!永遠の迷い子·良牙)	Takeshi Mori	Yoshio Urasawa	Takeshi Mori	Atsuko Nakajima	May 27, 1989
8	8	"School Is a Battlefield! Ranma vs. Ryoga"; Transliteration: "Gakkō wa Senjō da! Taiketsu Ranma Buiesu Ryōga" (Japanese: 学校は戦場だ!対決 乱馬VS良牙)	Kazuhiro Furuhashi	Toshiki Inoue	Kazuhiro Furuhashi	Masako Gotō	June 3, 1989
9	9	"True Confessions! A Girl's Hair Is Her Life!"; Transliteration: "Otome Hakusho—Kami wa Onna no Inochi Nano" (Japanese: 乙女白書·髪は女のいのちなの)	Shinji Takagi	Toshiki Inoue	Shinji Takagi	Asami Endo	June 17, 1989
10	10	"P-P-P-Chan! He's Good For Nothin'"; Transliteration: "Pi-pi-P-chan Roku Namonjanē" (Japanese: ピーピーPちゃん ろくなもんじゃねェ)	Takeshi Mori	Yoshiyuki Suga	Takeshi Mori	Atsuko Nakajima	July 1, 1989
11	11	"Ranma Meets Love Head-On! Enter the Delinquent Juvenile Gymnast!"; Transliteration: "Ranma o Gekiai! Shintaisō no Sukeban Tōjō" (Japanese: 乱馬を激愛!新体操のスケバン登場)	Kazuhiro Furuhashi	Hiroyuki Kawasaki	Kazuhiro Furuhashi	Masako Gotō	July 15, 1989
12	12	"A Woman's Love Is War! The Martial Arts Rhythmic Gymnastics Challenge!"; Transliteration: "Onna no Koi wa Sensō yo! Kakutō Shintaisō de Iza Shōbu" (Japanese: 女の恋は戦争よ!格闘新体操でいざ勝負)	Shinji Takagi	Katsuyuki Sumisawa	Yo Arisako	Asami Endo	July 22, 1989
13	13	"A Tear in a Girl-Delinquent's Eye? The End of the Martial Arts Rhythmic Gymnastics Challenge!"; Transliteration: "Sukeban no Me ni Namida? Rūru Muyō no Kakutō Shintaisō Kecchaku" (Japanese: スケバンの目に涙?ルール無用の格闘新体操決着)	Tomomi Mochizuki	Hideo Takayashiki	Tomomi Mochizuki	Atsuko Nakajima	July 29, 1989
14	14	"Pelvic Fortune-Telling? Ranma Is the No. One Bride in Japan"; Transliteration: "Kotsuban Uranai! Ranma wa Nippon-ichi no Oyomesan" (Japanese: 骨盤占い!らんまは日本一のお嫁さん)	Takeshi Mori	Hiroyuki Kawasaki	Tsutomu Shibayama	Masako Gotō	August 19, 1989
15	15	"Enter Shampoo, the Gung-Ho Girl! I Put My Life in Your Hands"; Transliteration: "Gekiretsu Shōjo Shanpū Tōjō! Watashi Inochi Azukemasu" (Japanese: 激烈少女シャンプー登場!ワタシ命あずけます)	Takeshi Mori	Katsuyuki Sumisawa	Takeshi Mori	Asami Endo	August 26, 1989
16	16	"Shampoo's Revenge! The Shiatsu Technique That Steals Heart and Soul"; Transliteration: "Shanpū no Hangeki! Hissatsu Shiatsu Kobushi wa Mukuro mo Kokoro mo Ubau" (Japanese: シャンプーの反撃!必殺指圧拳は身も心も奪う)	Kazuhiro Furuhashi	Katsuyuki Sumisawa	Kazuhiro Furuhashi	Atsuko Nakajima	September 2, 1989
17	17	"I Love You, Ranma! Please Don't Say Goodbye"; Transliteration: "Ranma Daisuki! Sayonara wa Iwanaide!!" (Japanese: 乱馬大好き!さよならはいわないで!!)	Shinji Takagi	Aya Matsui	Shinji Takagi	Masako Gotō	September 9, 1989
18	18	"I Am a Man! Ranma's Going Back to China!?"; Transliteration: "Ore wa Otoko da! Ranma Chūgoku e Kaeru?" (Japanese: オレは男だ!らんま中国へ帰る?)	Kazuhiro Furuhashi	Taku Nomoto	Kazuhiro Furuhashi	Atsuko Nakajima, etc	September 16, 1989

=== Season 2 "Anything-Goes Martial Arts" (1989–1990) ===
Note: This is the beginning of Ranma ½ Nettōhen (らんま½ 熱闘編).

No. overall	No. in season	Title	Directed by	Written by	Storyboarded by	Animation directed by	Original release date
19	1	"Clash of the Delivery Girls! The Martial Arts Takeout Race"; Transliteration: "Gekitotsu! Demae Kakutō Rēsu" (Japanese: 激突!出前格闘レース)	Tomomi Mochizuki	Toshiki Inoue	Koji Sawai	Atsuko Nakajima	October 20, 1989
20	2	"You Really Do Hate Cats!"; Transliteration: "Yappari Neko ga Kirai?" (Japanese: やっぱり猫が嫌い?)	Noriyuki Nakamura	Hiroshi Toda	Tamiko Kojima	Asami Endo	November 3, 1989
21	3	"This Ol' Gal's the Leader of the Amazon Tribe!"; Transliteration: "Watashi ga Joketsuzoku no Obaba!" (Japanese: 私が女傑族のおばば!)	Shinji Takagi	Hiroshi Toda	Shinji Takagi	Atsuko Nakajima	November 10, 1989
22	4	"Behold! The 'Chestnuts Roasting on an Open Fire' Technique"; Transliteration: "Deta! Hissatsu Tenshin Amaguriken" (Japanese: 出た!必殺天津甘栗拳!!)	Kazuhiro Furuhashi	Yoshiyuki Suga	Kazuhiro Furuhashi	Masaki Kudo	November 17, 1989
23	5	"Enter Mousse! The Fist of the White Swan"; Transliteration: "Hakushōken no Otoko Mūsu Tōjō!" (Japanese: 白鳥拳の男ムース登場!)	Takashi Kobayashi	Hisashi Tokimura	Tamiko Kojima	Asami Endo	November 24, 1989
24	6	"Cool Runnings! The Race of the Snowmen"; Transliteration: "Bakusō! Yukidaruma Hakobi Rēsu" (Japanese: 爆走!雪だるま運びレース)	Noriyuki Nakamura	Kazuhito Hisajima	Koji Sawai	Atsuko Nakajima	December 1, 1989
25	7	"The Abduction of P-Chan"; Transliteration: "Sarawareta P-chan" (Japanese: さらわれたPちゃん!)	Kazuhiro Furuhashi	Toshiki Inoue	Kazuhiro Furuhashi	Asami Endo	December 8, 1989
26	8	"Close Call! The Dance of Death... On Ice!"; Transliteration: "Kikiippatsu! Shiryō no Bonodori" (Japanese: 危機一髪!死霊の盆踊り)	Shinji Takagi	Aya Matsui	Shinji Takagi	Atsuko Nakajima	December 15, 1989
27	9	"P-Chan Explodes! The Icy Fountain of Love!"; Transliteration: "P-chan Bakuhatsu! Ai no Mizubashira" (Japanese: Pちゃん爆発!愛の水柱)	Tomomi Mochizuki	Hiroyuki Kawasaki	Tomomi Mochizuki	Masako Gotō	December 22, 1989
28	10	"Ranma Trains on Mt. Terror"; Transliteration: "Ranma Kyōfu no Yama Gomori" (Japanese: 乱馬恐怖の山ごもり)	Shinji Takagi	Yoshiyuki Suga	Shinji Takagi	Masaki Kudo	January 12, 1990
29	11	"The Breaking Point!? Ryoga's Great Revenge"; Transliteration: "Bakusai Tenketsu to wa? Ryōga Daigyakushū" (Japanese: 爆砕点穴とは?良牙大逆襲)	Kazuhiro Furuhashi	Yoshiyuki Suga	Kazuhiro Furuhashi	Asami Endo	January 19, 1990
30	12	"Danger at the Tendo Dojo!"; Transliteration: "Ayoushi! Tendō Dōjō" (Japanese: 危うし!天道道場)	Chisato Shigeki	Hisashi Tokimura	Chisato Shigeki	Atsuko Nakajima	January 26, 1990
31	13	"The Abduction of Akane!"; Transliteration: "Sarawareta Akane!" (Japanese: さらわれたあかね!)	Takashi Kobayashi	Hiroko Naka	Masahisa Ishida	Masaki Kudo	February 2, 1990
32	14	"Ranma vs. Mousse! To Lose Is To Win"; Transliteration: "Taiketsu Mūsu! Makeru ga Kachi" (Japanese: 対決ムース!負けるが勝ち)	Noriyuki Nakamura	Hiroshi Toda	Masahisa Ishida	Asami Endo	February 9, 1990
33	15	"Enter Happosai, the Lustful Lecher!"; Transliteration: "Kyūkyoku no Ero Yōkai Happōsai" (Japanese: 究極のエロ妖怪八宝斉)	Shinji Takagi	Yoshiyuki Suga	Tamiko Kojima	Atsuko Nakajima	February 16, 1990
34	16	"Assault on the Girls' Locker Room"; Transliteration: "Joshi Kōishitsu wo Osoe?" (Japanese: 女子更衣室を襲え?)	Kazuhiro Furuhashi	Hiroshi Toda	Kazuhiro Furuhashi	Masaki Kudo	February 23, 1990
35	17	"Kuno's House of Gadgets! Guests Check In, But They Don't Check Out"; Transliteration: "Oni mo Nigedasu Karakuri Yashiki" (Japanese: 鬼も逃げだすカラクリ屋敷)	Chisato Shigeki	Kazuhito Hisajima	Koji Sawai	Asami Endo	March 2, 1990
36	18	"Goodbye Girl-Type"; Transliteration: "Kore de Onna to Osaraba?" (Japanese: これで女とおさらば?)	Takashi Kobayashi	Hiroshi Toda	Tamiko Kojima	Atsuko Nakajima	March 9, 1990
37	19	"It's a Fine Line Between Pleasure and Pain"; Transliteration: "Ai to Nikushimi no Okurimono" (Japanese: 愛と憎しみの贈物)	Noriyuki Nakamura	Hiroko Naka	Kazuhiro Furuhashi	Masaki Kudo	March 16, 1990
38	20	"S.O.S.! The Wrath of Happosai"; Transliteration: "SOS Ero Yōkai Happōsai" (Japanese: SOSエロ妖怪八宝斉)	Shinji Takagi	Yoshiyuki Suga	Koji Sawai	Asami Endo	March 23, 1990
39	21	"Kissing is Such Sweet Sorrow! The Taking of Akane's Lips"; Transliteration: "Akane no Kuchibiru wo Ubae" (Japanese: あかねの口びるを奪え)	Takashi Kobayashi	Hiroshi Toda	Masahisa Ishida	Atsuko Nakajima	April 6, 1990
40	22	"Bathhouse Battle! We're in Some Hot Water Now"; Transliteration: "Ii Yu da na? Sentou de Sentou" (Japanese: いい湯だな?銭湯で戦闘)	Kazuhiro Furuhashi	Hiroko Naka	Kazuhiro Furuhashi	Hiroko Kazui	April 13, 1990

=== Season 3 "Hard Battle" (1990) ===
No. overall	No. in season	Title	Original release date
23	1	"Ranma Gains Yet Another Suitor"; Transliteration: "Mata Hitori Ranma wo Aishita Yatsu" (Japanese: また一人乱馬を愛したヤツ)	April 20, 1990
24	2	"Ryoga & Akane: 2-Gether, 4-Ever"; Transliteration: "Netsuai? Ryōga to Akane" (Japanese: 熱愛?良牙とあかね)	April 27, 1990
25	3	"Sneeze Me, Squeeze Me, Please Me! Shampoo's Recipe For Disaster"; Transliteration: "Kushami Ippatsu Aishite Naito" (Japanese: くしゃみ一発愛してナイト)	May 4, 1990
26	4	"Rub-a-Dub-Dub! There's a Pervert in the Tub"; Transliteration: "Maboroshi no Happōdaikarin wo Sagase" (Japanese: 幻の八宝大華輪を探せ)	May 11, 1990
27	5	"I Love You! My Dear, Dear Ukyo"; Transliteration: "Daisuki! Watashi no Ucchan" (Japanese: 大好き!私のうっちゃん)	May 18, 1990
28	6	"The Witch Who Loved Me: A Japanese Ghost Story"; Transliteration: "Majo ga Aishita Shitagi Dorobō" (Japanese: 魔女が愛した下着ドロボー)	May 25, 1990
29	7	"Transform! Akane the Super-Duper Girl"; Transliteration: "Henshin! Mukimuki-man Akane" (Japanese: 変身!ムキムキマンあかね)	June 1, 1990
30	8	"The Killer From Jusenkyo"; Transliteration: "Jusenkyō kara Kita Koroshiya" (Japanese: 呪泉郷から来た殺し屋)	June 8, 1990
31	9	"Am I... Pretty? Ranma's Declaration of Womanhood"; Transliteration: "Watashi Kirei? Ranma Onna Sengen" (Japanese: 私ってきれい?乱馬女宣言)	June 15, 1990
32	10	"Final Facedown! Happosai vs. The Invisible Man"; Transliteration: "Taiketsu! Happōsai Buiesu Tōmeiningen" (Japanese: 対決!八宝斉VS透明人間)	June 22, 1990
33	11	"Les Misérables of the Kuno Estate"; Transliteration: "Kunōke no Re Miseraburu" (Japanese: 九能家のレ·ミゼラブル)	June 29, 1990
34	12	"Ghost Story! Ranma and the Magic Sword"; Transliteration: "Kaidan! Ranma to Mashō no Ken" (Japanese: 怪談!乱馬と魔性の剣)	July 6, 1990
35	13	"All It Takes is One! The Kiss of Love is the Kiss of Death"; Transliteration: "Hitotsubu Korori – Zetsurin Hore Gusuri" (Japanese: 一粒コロリ·絶倫ホレ薬)	July 13, 1990
36	14	"The Ultimate Team-up!? The Ryoga/Mousse Alliance"; Transliteration: "Shijō Saikyō? Ryōga to Mūsu Dōmei" (Japanese: 史上最強?良牙とムース同盟)	July 20, 1990
37	15	"Back to the Happosai!"; Transliteration: "Bakku Tu Za Happōsai" (Japanese: バック·トゥ·ザ·八宝斉)	July 27, 1990
38	16	"Kodachi the Black Rose! The Beeline to True Love"; Transliteration: "Kurobara no Kodachi! Jun'ai Icchokusen" (Japanese: 黒バラの小太刀!純愛一直線)	August 3, 1990
39	17	"The Last Days of Happosai...?"; Transliteration: "Happōsai Saigo no Hi?" (Japanese: 八宝斉 最期の日?)	August 10, 1990
40	18	"Two, Too Violent Girls: Ling-Ling & Lung-Lung"; Transliteration: "Abarenbō Musume Rinrin Ranran" (Japanese: 暴れん坊娘リンリンランラン)	August 17, 1990
41	19	"Ranma and the Evil Within"; Transliteration: "Ranma wo Osō Kyōfu no Tatari" (Japanese: 乱馬を襲う恐怖のタタリ)	August 24, 1990
42	20	"Enter Ken and His Copycat Kerchief"; Transliteration: "Toujou! Monomane Kakutōgi" (Japanese: 登場!ものまね格闘技)	August 31, 1990
43	21	"Ryoga's Miracle Cure! Hand Over That Soap"; Transliteration: "Ryōga no Taishitsu Kaizen Sekken!" (Japanese: 良牙の体質改善セッケン!)	September 7, 1990
44	22	"Fight! The Anything-Goes Obstacle Course Race"; Transliteration: "Kakutō! Shōgaibutsu Rēsu" (Japanese: 格闘!障害物レース)	September 14, 1990
45	23	"Ranma Goes Back to Jusenkyo at Last"; Transliteration: "Ranma, Tsuini Jusenkyō e Iku" (Japanese: 乱馬, ついに呪泉郷へ行く)	September 21, 1990

=== Season 4 "Outta Control" (1990–91) ===
Note: Episode 51 was not included in Viz's season 4 release, but in season 3. It is shown below for proper chronological purposes.

No. overall	No. in season	Title	Original release date
46	65	"The Return of the Hawaiian Headmaster from Hell"; Transliteration: "Kaettekita Hentai Kōchō" (Japanese: 帰ってきた変態校長)	October 5, 1990
47	66	"Enter Kuno, the Night-Prowling Knight"; Transliteration: "Tōjō! Shijō Saikyō ni Kunō" (Japanese: 登場!史上最強の九能)	October 12, 1990
48	67	"Ranma Gets Weak!"; Transliteration: "Ranma ga Yowaku Nacchatta!" (Japanese: 乱馬が弱くなっちゃった!)	October 19, 1990
49	68	"Eureka! The Desperate Move of Desperation"; Transliteration: "Kansei! Tondemonai Hissatsuwaza" (Japanese: 完成!とんでもない必殺技)	October 26, 1990
50	69	"Showdown! Can Ranma Make a Comeback?"; Transliteration: "Kessen! Ranma Fukkatsu Naru ka?" (Japanese: 決戦!乱馬復活なるか?)	November 2, 1990
51	63	"Ukyo's Skirt! The Great Girly-Girl Gambit"; Transliteration: "Ukyō no Sukāto Daisakusen" (Japanese: 右京のスカート大作戦!)	November 9, 1990
52	70	"Here Comes Ranma's Mom!"; Transliteration: "Ranma no Mama ga Yattekita!" (Japanese: 乱馬のママがやってきた!)	November 16, 1990
53	71	"From Ryoga with Love"; Transliteration: "Ryōga, Ai to Kunō wo Koete" (Japanese: 良牙, 愛と苦悩を越えて)	November 23, 1990
54	72	"My Fiancé, the Cat"; Transliteration: "Fianse wa Bakeneko" (Japanese: フィアンセは化け猫)	November 30, 1990
55	73	"Blow, Wind! To Be Young is to Go Gung-Ho"; Transliteration: "Fukeyo Kaze! Seishun wa Nekketsuda" (Japanese: 吹けよ風!青春は熱血だ)	December 7, 1990
56	74	"A Formidable New Disciple Appears"; Transliteration: "Osorubeki Shindeshi Arawaru" (Japanese: 恐るべき新弟子現わる)	December 14, 1990
57	75	"Step Outside!"; Transliteration: "Omote ni Deyagare!" (Japanese: おもてに出やがれ!)	December 21, 1990
58	76	"Ryoga's "Tendo Dojo Houseguest" Diary"; Transliteration: "Ryōga no Tendō Dōjō Isōrō Nikki" (Japanese: 良牙の天道道場居候日記)	January 11, 1991
59	77	"Happosai's Happy Heart!"; Transliteration: "Happōsai no Koi!" (Japanese: 八宝斉の恋!)	January 18, 1991
60	78	"Extra, Extra! Kuno & Nabiki: Read All About It!"; Transliteration: "Kunō Bōzen! Koi no Daiyogen" (Japanese: 九能ボー然!恋の大予言)	January 25, 1991
61	79	"Ryoga the Strong... Too Strong"; Transliteration: "Tsuyoku Narisugita Ryōga" (Japanese: 強くなりすぎた良牙)	February 1, 1991
62	80	"Close Call! P-chan's Secret"; Transliteration: "Ayaushi! P-chan no Himitsu" (Japanese: あやうし!Pちゃんの秘密)	February 8, 1991
63	81	"The Egg-Catcher Man"; Transliteration: "Tamago wo Tsukamu Otoko" (Japanese: たまごをつかむ男)	February 15, 1991
64	82	"Ranma and Kuno's... First Kiss"; Transliteration: "Ranma to Kunō no Hatsu Kisu?!" (Japanese: らんまと九能の初キッス?!)	February 22, 1991
65	83	"Shampoo's Red Thread of Dread!"; Transliteration: "Shanpū no Akai Ito" (Japanese: シャンプーの赤い糸)	March 1, 1991
66	84	"Mousse Goes Home to the Country!"; Transliteration: "Mūsu Kokyō ni Kaeru" (Japanese: ムース故郷に帰る)	March 8, 1991
67	85	"The Dumbest Bet in History!"; Transliteration: "Shijō Saite no Kake" (Japanese: 史上サイテーの賭け)	March 15, 1991
68	86	"Kuno Becomes a Marianne!"; Transliteration: "Mariannu ni Natta Kunō" (Japanese: マリアンヌになった九能)	March 22, 1991
69	87	"Ranma, You Are Such A Jerk!"; Transliteration: "Ranma Nanka Daikirai!" (Japanese: 乱馬なんか大キライ!)	March 29, 1991

=== Season 5 "Martial Mayhem" (1991) ===
Note Episode 72 was not included in Viz's season 5 release, but in season 4. It is shown below for proper chronological purposes.

No. overall	No. in season	Title	Original release date
70	89	"Gimme That Pigtail"; Transliteration: "Sono Osage Moratta!" (Japanese: そのおさげもらったぁ!)	April 5, 1991
71	90	"When a Guy's Pride and Joy is Gone"; Transliteration: "Otoko no Yabō ga Tsukiru Toki..." (Japanese: 男の野望が尽きる時...)	April 12, 1991
72	88	"Ling-Ling & Lung-Lung Strike Back!"; Transliteration: "Rinrin Ranran no Gyakushū" (Japanese: リンリン·ランランの逆襲)	April 19, 1991
73	91	"Ryoga's Proposal"; Transliteration: "Ryōga no Puropōsu" (Japanese: 良牙のプロポーズ)	April 26, 1991
74	92	"Genma Takes a Walk"; Transliteration: "Genma, Iede Suru" (Japanese: 玄馬, 家出する)	May 3, 1991
75	93	"The Gentle Art of Martial Tea Ceremony"; Transliteration: "Kore ga Kakutō Sadō de Omasu" (Japanese: これが格闘茶道でおます)	May 10, 1991
76	94	"And the Challenger is... A Girl?!"; Transliteration: "Dōjō Yaburi wa Onna no Ko?" (Japanese: 道場破りは女の子?)	May 17, 1991
77	95	"Hot Springs Battle Royale!"; Transliteration: "Zekkyō! Onsen Batoru" (Japanese: 絶叫!温泉バトル)	May 24, 1991
78	96	"Me is Kuno's Daddy, Me is" Transliteration: "Mī ga Kunō no Dadi Desu" (Japanese: ミーが九能のダディです)	May 31, 1991
79	97	"The Matriarch Takes a Stand"; Transliteration: "Kakutō Sadō Iemoto Tatsu!" (Japanese: 格闘茶道·家元立つ!)	June 7, 1991
80	98	"A Leotard is a Girl's Burden"; Transliteration: "Reotādo wa Otome no Noroi" (Japanese: レオタードは乙女の呪い)	June 14, 1991
81	99	"The Mixed-Bath Horror!"; Transliteration: "Kyōfu no Kon'yoku Onsen" (Japanese: 恐怖の混浴温泉)	June 21, 1991
82	100	"The Frogman's Curse!"; Transliteration: "Kaeru no Urami Harashimasu" (Japanese: カエルのうらみはらします)	June 28, 1991
83	101	"Revenge! Raging Okonomiyaki...!"; Transliteration: "Gyakushū! Ikari no Okonomiyaki" (Japanese: 逆襲!怒りのお好み焼き)	July 5, 1991
84	102	"Ranma the Lady-Killer"; Transliteration: "Nanpa ni Natta Ranma" (Japanese: ナンパになった乱馬)	July 12, 1991
85	103	"Shogi Showdown"; Transliteration: "Kakutō Shogi wa Inochi Gake" (Japanese: 格闘将棋は命懸け)	July 19, 1991
86	104	"Sasuke's 'Mission: Improbable'"; Transliteration: "Sasuke no Supai Daisakusen" (Japanese: 佐助のスパイ大作戦)	July 26, 1991
87	105	"Bonjour, Furinkan!"; Transliteration: "Bonjūru de Gozaimasu" (Japanese: ボンジュールでございます)	August 2, 1991
88	106	"Dinner at Ringside!"; Transliteration: "Dinā wa Ringu no Uede" (Japanese: ディナーはリングの上で)	August 9, 1991
89	107	"Swimming with Psychos"; Transliteration: "Akane, Namida no Suiei Daitokkun" (Japanese: あかね, 涙の水泳大特訓)	August 16, 1991
90	108	"Ryoga, Run Into the Sunset"; Transliteration: "Ryōga! Yūhi ni Mukatte Hashire" (Japanese: 良牙!夕日に向かって走れ)	August 23, 1991
91	109	"Into the Darkness"; Transliteration: "Yume no Naka e" (Japanese: 夢の中へ)	August 30, 1991
92	110	"Nabiki, Ranma's New Fiancée!"; Transliteration: "Ranma wa Nabiki no Iinazuke?" (Japanese: 乱馬はなびきの許婚?)	September 6, 1991
93	111	"Case of the Missing Takoyaki!"; Transliteration: "Tendo-ke Kieta Takoyaki no Nazo" (Japanese: 天道家消えたたこ焼きの謎)	September 13, 1991
94	112	"Ranma vs. Shadow Ranma!"; Transliteration: "Taiketsu! Ranma vs. Kage Ranma" (Japanese: 対決!乱馬vs.影乱馬)	September 20, 1991

=== Season 6 "Random Rhapsody" (1991–92) ===
No. overall	No. in season	Title	Original release date
95	113	"Dear Daddy... Love, Kodachi!"; Transliteration: "Kodachi no Mai Raburī Papa" (Japanese: 小太刀のマイラブリーパパ)	September 27, 1991
96	114	"Enter Gosunkugi, The New Rival!?"; Transliteration: "Kyōteki? Gosunkugi-kun Tōjō" (Japanese: 強敵?五寸釘くん登場)	October 4, 1991
97	115	"Ranma's Calligraphy Challenge"; Transliteration: "Ranma wa Hetakuso? Kakutō Shodō" (Japanese: 乱馬はヘタクソ?格闘書道)	October 11, 1991
98	116	"The Secret Don of Furinkan High"; Transliteration: "Furinkan Kōkō, Kage no Don Tōjō" (Japanese: 風林館高校, 影のドン登場)	October 18, 1991
99	117	"Back to the Way We Were... Please!"; Transliteration: "Higan! Futsū no Otoko ni Modoritai" (Japanese: 悲願!普通の男に戻りたい)	October 25, 1991
100	118	"Ryoga Inherits the Saotome School?"; Transliteration: "Saotome Ryū no Atotsugi wa Ryōga?" (Japanese: 早乙女流の跡継ぎは良牙?)	November 1, 1991
101	119	"Tendo Family Goes to the Amusement Park!"; Transliteration: "Tendō-ke, Yūenchi e Iku" (Japanese: 天道家, 遊園地へ行く)	November 15, 1991
102	120	"The Case of the Furinkan Stalker!"; Transliteration: "Furinkan Kōkō: Toorima Jiken" (Japanese: 風林館高校·通り魔事件)	November 29, 1991
103 104	122 123	"The Demon from Jusenkyo"; Transliteration: "Jusenkyō Kara Kita Akuma" (Japanese: 呪泉郷から来た悪魔)	December 6, 1991 December 13, 1991
105	125	"A Xmas Without Ranma"; Transliteration: "Ranma ga Inai Xmas" (Japanese: 乱馬がいないXmas)	December 20, 1991
106	126	"A Cold Day in Furinkan"; Transliteration: "Yukinko Fuyu Monogatari" (Japanese: 雪ん子冬物語)	January 10, 1992
107	128	"Curse of the Scribbled Panda"; Transliteration: "Rakugaki Panda no Noroi" (Japanese: らくがきパンダの呪い)	January 17, 1992
108	121	"The Date-Monster of Watermelon Island"; Transliteration: "Suikatō no Kōsaiki" (Japanese: スイカ島の交際鬼)	January 24, 1992
109	129	"Legend of the Lucky Panda!"; Transliteration: "Shiawase no Panda Densetsu" (Japanese: 幸せのパンダ伝説)	January 31, 1992
110 111	131 132	"Ukyo's Secret Sauce"; Transliteration: "Ranma to Ukyo ga Sōsu Sōai?/Itsuwari Fūfu yo Eien ni..." (Japanese: 乱馬と右京がソース相愛?/偽り夫婦よ永遠に...)	February 7, 1992 February 14, 1992
112	124	"The Missing Matriarch of Martial Arts Tea!"; Transliteration: "Kakutō Sadō! Sarawareta Iemoto" (Japanese: 格闘茶道!さらわれた家元)	February 21, 1992
113	127	"Akane Goes to the Hospital!"; Transliteration: "Taihen! Akane ga Nyūin Shita" (Japanese: 大変!あかねが入院した)	February 28, 1992
114	130	"Mystery of the Marauding Octopus Pot!"; Transliteration: "Nazono Abare Takotsubo Arawareru?!" (Japanese: 謎の暴れタコツボ現る?!)	March 6, 1992
115	134	"Gosunkugi's Paper Dolls of Love"; Transliteration: "Gosunkugi! Ah Koi no Kaminingyō" (Japanese: 五寸釘!あぁ恋の紙人形)	March 13, 1992
116	135	"Akane's Unfathomable Heart"; Transliteration: "Akane no Kokoro ga Wakaranai" (Japanese: あかねの心がわからない)	March 20, 1992
117	133	"A Teenage Ghost Story"; Transliteration: "Tsuiseki! Temari Uta no Nazo" (Japanese: 追跡!手まり唄の謎)	March 27, 1992
118	136	"Master and Student... Forever!?"; Transliteration: "Mou Anata kara Hanarenai" (Japanese: もうあなたから離れない)	April 3, 1992

=== Season 7 "Ranma Forever" (1992) ===
No. overall	No. in season	Title	Original release date
119	137	"Tatewaki Kuno, Substitute Principal"; Transliteration: "Kunō Tatewaki, Dairi Kōchō wo Meizu" (Japanese: 九能帯刀, 代理校長を命ず)	April 10, 1992
120	138	"Ranma's Greatest Challenge!?"; Transliteration: "Ranma, Tsukiyo ni Hoeru" (Japanese: 乱馬, 月夜に吠える)	April 17, 1992
121	139	"Nihao! Jusenkyo Guide"; Transliteration: "Nihao! Jusenkyō no Gaido-san" (Japanese: 你好(ニーハオ)!呪泉郷のガイドさん)	April 24, 1992
122	140	"Pick-a-Peck o' Happosai"; Transliteration: "Meiwaku! Rokunin no Happōsai" (Japanese: 迷惑!六人の八宝斉)	May 1, 1992
123 124	141 142	"From the Depths of Despair"; Transliteration: "Kibun Shidai no Hissatsuwaza" (Japanese: 気分しだいの必殺技)	May 8, 1992 May 15, 1992
125	143	"Shampoo's Cursed Kiss"; Transliteration: "Shanpū Toraware no Kissu" (Japanese: シャンプー囚われのキッス)	May 22, 1992
126	144	"Run Away With Me, Ranma!"; Transliteration: "Boku to Kakeochi Shite kudasai" (Japanese: ボクと駆け落ちして下さい)	May 29, 1992
127	145	"Let's Go to the Mushroom Temple"; Transliteration: "Kinoko Dera e Ikō" (Japanese: キノコ寺へ行こう)	June 5, 1992
128	146	"The Cradle from Hell"; Transliteration: "Hissatsu! Jigoku no Yurikago" (Japanese: 必殺!地獄のゆりかご)	June 12, 1992
129	147	"Madame St. Paul's Cry for Help"; Transliteration: "Aoi Kyōfu ni Bonjūru" (Japanese: 青い恐怖にボンジュール)	June 19, 1992
130	148	"Meet You in the Milky Way"; Transliteration: "Orihime wa Nagareboshi ni Notte" (Japanese: 織姫は流れ星に乗って)	June 26, 1992
131	149	"Wretched Rice Cakes Of Love"; Transliteration: "Hitotsu Meshimase Koi no Sakuramochi" (Japanese: 一つ召しませ恋の桜餅)	July 3, 1992
132	150	"The Horrible Happo Mold-Burst"; Transliteration: "Dekita! Happō Dai Kabin" (Japanese: できた!八宝大カビン)	July 10, 1992
133	151	"The Kuno Sibling Scandal"; Transliteration: "Kunō Kyōdai Sukyandaru no Arashi" (Japanese: 九能兄妹スキャンダルの嵐)	July 17, 1992
134	152	"Battle for the Golden Tea Set"; Transliteration: "Ougon no Chaki, Gojōnotō no Kessen" (Japanese: 黄金の茶器, 五重塔の決戦)	July 24, 1992
135	153	"Gosunkugi's Summer Affair"; Transliteration: "Gosunkugi Hikaru, Hito Natsu no Koi" (Japanese: 五寸釘光, ひと夏の恋)	July 31, 1992
136 137	155 156	"Bring It On! Love as a Cheerleader"; Transliteration: "Ai no Kakutō Chiagāru" (Japanese: 愛の格闘チアガール)	August 7, 1992 August 14, 1992
138	154	"Battle for Miss Beachside"; Transliteration: "Kettei! Misu Bīchisaido" (Japanese: 決定!ミス·ビーチサイド)	August 21, 1992
139	157	"The Musical Instruments of Destruction"; Transliteration: "Bakuretsu! Haipā Tsuzumi" (Japanese: 爆裂!ハイパーツヅミ)	August 28, 1992
140	158	"A Ninja's Dog is Black and White"; Transliteration: "Shinobi no Inu wa Shiro to Kuro" (Japanese: 忍の犬は白と黒)	September 4, 1992
141	159	"The Tendo Dragon Legend"; Transliteration: "Tendō-ke: Ryūjin Densetsu" (Japanese: 天道家·龍神伝説)	September 11, 1992
142 143	160 161	"Boy Meets Mom"; Transliteration: "Ranma, Mītsu Mazā/Itsu no Hi ka, Kitto..." (Japanese: 乱馬, ミーツ·マザー/いつの日か, きっと...)	September 18, 1992 September 25, 1992

== Films (1991–1994) ==
Number	Title	Release date
1	Ranma ½: The Battle of Nekonron, China! A Battle to Defy the Rules! (らんま1/2 中国寝崑崙大決戦! 掟やぶりの激闘篇!!, Ranma Nibunnoichi Chūgoku Nekonron Daikessen! Okite Yaburi no Gekitō Hen!) (Viz title: Ranma ½: Big Trouble in Nekonron, China)	November 2, 1991
It's just another day at the Tendo Anything-Goes Martial Arts Training Hall, that is, until a strange girl named Lychee and her giant elephant Jasmine arrive to settle a score with lecherous martial arts master Happosai. Apparently, a very long time ago, Happosai gave Lychee's great-grandmother half of a legendary scroll guaranteed to bring happiness to whoever was holding it. The women of Lychee's family have been waiting for three generations now, and the prince still has not come. But of course, the moment Lychee lets the scroll out of her hands, the prince finally appears. Only now it's the reluctant fiancée Akane Tendo who is holding the scroll, and the long-awaited prince is only too ready to sweep his lucky bride off her feet. Ranma Saotome and the others currently have no choice but to follow Prince Kirin's majestic flying barge all the way to Nekonron, China, where they find themselves in a showdown with the seven lucky gods of martial arts.
2	Ranma ½: Battle at Togenkyo! Get Back the Brides (らんま1/2 決戦桃幻郷! 花嫁を奪りもどせ!!, Ranma Nibunnoichi Kessen Tōgenkyō! Hanayome wo Torimodose!) (Viz title: Ranma ½: Nihao, My Concubine)	August 1, 1992
When poetry-spouting swordsman Tatewaki Kuno invites Ranma and the others for a jaunt on his new luxury yacht, the last thing the group expects is a sudden storm to shipwreck them all on a deserted island. However, fixing the boat to get home soon becomes the least of their worries, as all the young girls in the group begin to disappear. They have been bride-napped by Prince Toma, the youthful ruler of a floating island, Togenkyo. Because of a magical spring which turns anything it touches instantly male, would-be bridegrooms kidnap girls.
3	Ranma ½: Super Indiscriminate Decisive Battle! Team Ranma vs. the Legendary Phoenix (らんま1/2 超無差別決戦! 乱馬チームVS伝説の鳳凰, Ranma Nibunnoichi Chō Musabetsu Kessen! Ranma Team tai Densetsu no Hōō) (Viz title: "One Grew Over the Kuno's Nest")	August 20, 1994
The short film was shown together with Heisei Dog Stories (平成イヌ物語バウ) and the movie Ghost Sweeper Mikami at the Toei Film Festival. Later it was first released in Japan on VHS and Laserdisc and get an Opening Owaranai Natsu Yasumi (終わらない夏休み) by DoCo and an Ending Usotsuki (うそつき) by DoCo, present in Fullscreen. The movie itself is produced in widescreen. When released in North America by Viz, it was labeled as OVA number 9 and released with the 11 OVAs. The DVD release of the third film in Japan is also released together with the 11 OVAs.

== OVAs (1993–2008) ==
Following the ending of the TV series, 11 OVAs were released directly to home video, the earliest on October 21, 1993, and the eleventh on June 4, 1996. All but three are based on stories originally in the manga.

Viz Media released all 11 OVAs in North American in one set. It also includes the third film, Super Indiscriminate Decisive Battle! Team Ranma vs. the Legendary Phoenix, added as the ninth episode, bringing the set's episode count to 12.

Twelve years after the eleventh OVA was released, a new piece of Ranma ½ animation was made for the "It's a Rumic World" exhibition of Rumiko Takahashi's artwork. It is based on the "Nightmare! Incense of Deep Sleep" manga story from volume 34, and was shown on odd numbered days at the exhibition in Tokyo from July 30 to August 11, 2008. This half-hour special was directed by Takeshi Mori (an episode director on the first season of the TV series) with animation direction by Ranma veteran animator and character designer Atsuko Nakajima. But it was not released until January 29, 2010, when it was put in a DVD box set with the Urusei Yatsura and InuYasha specials that premiered at the same exhibit. It was then released on DVD and Blu-ray by itself on October 20, 2010.

Number	Title	Release date
1	"Shampoo's Sudden Switch – The Curse of the Contrary Jewel"; Shampoo Hyōhen! Hanten Hōju no Wazawai (シャンプー豹変！反転宝珠の禍)	October 21, 1993
2	"Tendo Family Christmas Scramble"; Tendō-ke Scramble Christmas (天道家すくらんぶるクリスマス)	December 17, 1993
3	"Akane vs. Ranma! I'll Be the One to Inherit Mother's Recipes!"; Akane vs Ranma: Okā-san no Aji wa Watashi ga Mamoru! (あかねVSらんま お母さんの味は私が守る！)	February 18, 1994
4	"Stormy Weather Comes to School! Growing Up With Miss Hinako"; Gakuen ni Fuku Arashi! Adult Change Hinako-sensei (学園に吹く嵐！アダルトチェンジひな子先生)	April 21, 1994
5	"The One to Carry On (1)"; Michi o Tsugu Mono – Zenpen (道を継ぐ者・前編)	June 17, 1994
6	"The One to Carry On (2)"; Michi o Tsugu Mono – Kōhen (道を継ぐ者・後編)	August 19, 1994
7	"Reawakening Memories (1)"; Yomigaeru Kioku – Jōkan (よみがえる記憶・上巻)	December 16, 1994
8	"Reawakening Memories (2)"; Yomigaeru Kioku – Gekan (よみがえる記憶・下巻)	February 17, 1995
9	"Oh, Cursed Tunnel of Lost Love! Let My Love Be Forever"; Aa! Noroi no Harendō! Waga Ai wa Eien ni (ああ呪いの破恋洞！我が愛は永遠に)	September 21, 1995
10	"The Evil Ogre! Hell Hath No Fury Like Kasumi Scorned"; Jāku no Oni (邪悪の鬼)	November 17, 1995
11	"The Two Akanes! 'Ranma, Look at Me!'"; Futari no Akane: "Ranma, Atashi o Mite!" (二人のあかね『乱馬、私を見て！』)	January 19, 1996
12	"Nightmare! Incense of Deep Sleep"; Akumu! Shunminkō (悪夢!春眠香)	July 31, 2008

Theme songs

Many of the theme songs are sung by DoCo, a band formed by the five of the voice actress. DoCo USA is the name used by their corresponding English voice actors.

Opening themes:

- "It's Love! Panic!" (恋だ!パニック Koi da! Panikku) by Yawmin (1–6)
- "Us from Now On" (僕たちはこれから Bokutachi wa Kore Kara) by DoCo (7)
- "In the Middle of Elementary School" (授業中の小学校 Jugyōchū no Shōgakkō) by DoCo (8)
- "Neverending Summer Vacation" (終わらない夏休み Owaranai Natsu Yasumi) by DoCo (9, AKA Movie 3)
- "The Sparkling Sky & Your Voice" (かがやく空ときみの声 Kagayaku Sora to Kimi no Koe) by DoCo (10)
- "Full of Memories" (思い出がいっぱい Omoide ga Ippai) by DoCo (11)
- "Mutual Love is Complex (Live)" (フクザツな両想いLive Version Fukuzatsu na Ryōomoi Live Version) by DoCo (12)

Ending themes:

- "The Ballad of Ranma & Akane" (乱馬とあかねのバラード Ranma to Akane no Barādo) by Kappei Yamaguchi and Noriko Hidaka (1–6)
- "A Pure and Honest Christmas" (清く正しいクリスマス Kiyoku Tadashii Kurisumasu) by DoCo (7)
- "Red Shoe Sunday" (赤い靴のSUNDAY Akai Kutsu no Sunday) by DoCo (8)
- "Liar" (うそつき Usotsuki) by DoCo (9, AKA Movie 3)
- "A Slightly Hilly Road" (少しだけ坂道 Sukoshi Dake Sakamichi) by DoCo (10)
- "Love Vanished Once, Regrettably" (恋がひとつ消えてしまったの Koi ga Hitotsu Kiete Shimatta no) by DoCo (11)
- "Boyfriend" (彼 Kare) by DoCo (12)

Opening themes, Western release:

- "Love Panic! (English Version)" by Connie Lavigne (1–6)
- "Where Do We Go From Here (You and Me) (English Version)" by DoCo USA (7–12)

Ending themes, Western release:

- "The Ballad of Ranma & Akane" (乱馬とあかねのバラード Ranma to Akane no Barādo) by Kappei Yamaguchi and Noriko Hidaka (1–6)
- "Red Shoe Sunday (English Version)" by DoCo USA (7–12)

== Specials (1990–2011) ==
Ranma ½ had a handful of specials that were only available through home videos, or being a member of the Kitty Animation Circle, the fanclub for the production team that created Rumiko Takahashi's anime. These specials are extremely rare for the most part. With the exception of TV Titles (which was released in North America as The Ranma ½ Video Jukebox), none of the specials have been released outside Japan.

Title		Medium	Release date
Japanese	English (unofficial)	Medium	Release date
熱闘歌合戦 (Nettō Uta Gassen)	Hot Song Contest	VCD	7 November 1990
?	Ranma ½: Chuugoku Nekonron Daikessen! Preview	VHS	1991
天道家のおよびでない奴ら! (Tendō-ke no Oyobidenai Yatsura!)	Tendo Family's Annoying Acquaintances	VHS	30 August 1992
らんま1/2 1994年ミュージックカレンダー	Ranma ½: 1994 Music Calendar	VHS	early 1993
TVタイトルズ	TV Titles (Note: Viz Video reissued TV Titles on VHS in North America as The Ranma ½ Video Jukebox (1999))	VCD	21 April 1993
らんま1/2 とっておきトーク ベスト・オブ・メモリーズ	Ranma ½ Totteoki Talk: Best of Memories	VHS	1 May 1993
スペシャルビデオ バトルがいっぱい29人の懲りないやつら; Special Video: Battle ga Ippai 29-nin no Korinai Yatsura	Huge Battle! 29 Unteachable Fools	VCD	3 March 1995
DoCoミュージックビデオ	DoCo Music Video	VCD	19 August 1995
乱馬½	Ranma ½ Live-action Special	TV	9 December 2011

Opening Theme:

- "Tendo Family's Annoying Acquaintance": "Don't Make Me Wild Like You (Don't Make Me Be a Violent Girl)" (じゃじゃ馬にさせないで Jajauma ni Sasenaide) by Etsuko Nishio
- "Huge Battle! 29 Unteachable Fools": None

Ending Theme

- "Tendo Family's Annoying Acquaintance": "Friends" (フレンズ Furenzu) by YAWMIN
- "Huge Battle! 29 Unteachable Fools": "Hill of the Rainbow and the Sun" (虹と太陽の丘 Niji to Taiyō no Oka) by Piyo Piyo
- "Ranma 1/2 Live-action Special": "Chikutaku 2Nite" (チクタク☆2NITE) by 9nine
