= Fly, Daddy, Fly =

- Hangul: 플라이대디
- RR: Peullai daedi
- MR: P'ŭllai taedi
- Directed by: Choi Jong Tae
- Produced by: Jonathan Kim
- Starring: Lee Joon-gi; Lee Moon-sik
- Edited by: Kim Chang-ju
- Distributed by: CJ Entertainment
- Release date: August 3, 2006
- Country: South Korea
- Language: Korean
- Box office: $5,823,730

Fly, Daddy, Fly (Korean: 플라이대디) is a 2006 South Korean drama film. It is based upon a novel of the same name by Japanese author Kaneshiro Kazuki, where the Japanese version of the book was made into a Japanese film in 2005.

It was directed by Choi Jong-tae and produced by Dyne Film-Guardtec. Lee Joon-gi was reportedly paid ₩100 million, which is relatively low compared with his rising popularity following King and the Clown. This is because the contract was signed in early December before King and the Clown was released when Lee was an unknown actor.

== Synopsis ==
The film revolves around Jang Ka-pil (Lee Moon-sik) in his 40s, who leads an ordinary life with his adorable wife and their 17-year-old daughter, Dami (Kim So-eun). He faces a crisis when his daughter is sexually assaulted by a high school boxing star from a rich, well-connected family and he finds no help from the school or police authorities.

To prove that he is not a coward and will do anything for his family, he decides to take revenge and physically beat up his daughter's tormentor. For the seemingly impossible task, he asks Go Seung-suk (Lee Joon-gi), a rebellious high school student with a talent for fighting, to train him.

== Cast ==
- Lee Joon-gi as Go Seung-suk
- Lee Moon-sik as Jang Ga-pil
- Nam Hyun-joon as Oh Se-jung
- Kim Ji-hoon as Chae Su-bin
- Lee Yeon-su
- Kim So-eun as Jang Da-mi
- Hyun Woo
- Jo Sung-ha as Cha Joo-oh
- Lee Jae-yong
- Ahn Nae-sang (cameo)
- Woo Hyun (cameo)

== Reception ==
The two actors Lee Joon-gi and Lee Moon Shik met with the viewers August 3, 2006 for the movie's preview screening at the Daehan Theater and the Seoul Theater. Tickets that went on sale via the Internet on July 21 were sold out immediately, and box-office sales that began the following day closed in two hours.
