= The 101st Proposal =

2006 South Korean television drama

- Also known as: My Perfect Girl
- Hangul: 101번째 프로포즈
- RR: 101beonjjae peuropojeu
- MR: 101pŏntchae p'ŭrop'ojŭ
- Genre: Romantic comedy
- Based on: 101st Marriage Proposal (1991 Japanese TV series)
- Written by: Yoon Young-mi; Choi Wan-kyu
- Directed by: Jang Tae-yoo
- Starring: Lee Moon-sik; Park Sun-young
- Country of origin: South Korea
- Original language: Korean
- No. of episodes: 15

Production
- Producer: Kim Young-sup
- Running time: 60 minutes

Original release
- Network: SBS TV
- Release: May 29 – July 25, 2006

The 101st Proposal (Korean: 101번째 프로포즈; also known as My Perfect Girl) is a 2006 South Korean television series starring Lee Moon-sik and Park Sun-young. It aired on SBS from May 29 to July 25, 2006, on Mondays and Tuesdays at 21:55 (KST) for 15 episodes.

It is a remake of the Japanese drama 101st Marriage Proposal (Japanese: 101回目のプロポーズ, Hepburn: 101 kaime no Puropozu) which aired on Fuji TV in 1991.

== Plot ==
Perennial bachelor Park Dal-jae (Lee Moon-sik) has gone on more marriage blind dates than he can count, but he still can't find a wife. It's a tough market since he's not young, good-looking, or rich, but he's got his heart in the right place. On his 100th date, he finally meets the perfect girl, 29-year-old announcer Han Soo-jung (Park Sun-young).

The death of her first love, Chan-hyuk, has put Soo-jung's life at a standstill. Her aunt badgers her into going on a blind date with Dal-jae, and Soo-jung is amazed that he says exactly the same words Chan-hyuk had said when he proposed to her.

She gets angry when she later learns that he'd been coached by his younger brother. Soo-jung tries to keep treating him coldly, but Dal-jae's pure-hearted naivete makes her smile. As Soo-jung gradually opens up to him, Dal-jae becomes hopeful that she'll someday return his feelings. But then Woo-suk (Jung Sung-hwan), who looks exactly like Chan-hyuk, suddenly appears in Soo-jung's life.

== Cast ==
=== Main ===
- Lee Moon-sik as Park Dal-jae
- Park Sun-young as Han Soo-jung
- Song Chang-eui as Seo Hyun-joon
- Jung Sung-hwan as Jung Woo-suk

=== Supporting ===
- Im Hyun-sik as Park Chang-man
- Lee Joong-moon as Park Min-jae
- Hong Soo-ah as Han Geum-jung
- Choi Ran as Jang Eun-im
- Kim Hyung-ja as Yeom Sun-ja
- Jo Eun-sook as Noh Jung-soon
- Kim Ji-hye as Noh Chae-young
- Jung Kyung-ho as Oh Yong-pil
- Lee Joon-gi as himself (cameo)
