= Eighteen, Twenty-Nine =

2005 South Korean television series

- Also known as: 18, 29; 18:29; 18 vs. 29
- Hangul: 열여덟, 스물아홉
- RR: Yeoryeodeol, seumurahop
- MR: Yŏryŏdŏl, sŭmurahop
- Written by: Go Bong-hwang; Kim Kyung-hee
- Directed by: Kim Won-yong; Ham Young-hoon
- Starring: Park Sun-young; Ryu Soo-young
- Country of origin: South Korea
- No. of episodes: 16

Production
- Running time: Mondays and Tuesdays at 21:55 (KST)

Original release
- Network: KBS2
- Release: March 7 – April 26, 2005

Eighteen, Twenty-Nine (Korean: 열여덟, 스물아홉; RR: Yeoryeodeol, seumurahop; also known as 18 vs. 29) is a 2005 South Korean television series starring Park Sun-young and Ryu Soo-young. Based on the Internet novel The 4321 Days We Shared, the romantic comedy series aired on KBS2 from March 7 to April 26, 2005 on Mondays and Tuesdays at 21:55 for 16 episodes.

== Plot ==
Yoo Hye-chan (Park Sun-young) is a 29-year-old housewife who's unhappily married to a top acting star, Kang Sang-young (Ryu Soo-young). While on her way to court to file for divorce, a car accident drastically changes her life. Though she physically recovers, retrograde amnesia causes Hye-chan to mentally revert to that of an 18-year-old girl, and she finds everything around her unfamiliar.

In high school in the 1990s, Hye-chan considered Kang Bong-man, the most popular boy at school and nicknamed "Ice Prince," as her nemesis. Though seemingly shallow and callous, Bong-man hides his vulnerability due to his infamous family background. But little did Hye-chan know that her despised and hated classmate would become an actor one day, change his name to Kang Sang-young and become her future husband. For Sang-young, seeing his wife reliving their high school days rekindles their lost love, and he strives to mend their shattered marriage and help her recover her memory. Meanwhile, Hye-chan begins to fall for him all over again. The only obstacle is Shin Ji-young (Park Eun-hye), an actress who wants Sang-young for herself.

== Cast ==
- Park Sun-young - Yoo Hye-chan
  - Park Min-ji - young Yoo Hye-chan
- Ryu Soo-young - Kang Sang-young (Kang Bong-man)
  - Choi Si-won - young Kang Bong-man
- Park Eun-hye - Shin Ji-young
- Lee Joong-moon - Kim Noon
- Shin Goo - Kang Chi-soo
- Jo Eun-ji - Yoo Hye-won
  - Jung Ji-ahn - young Yoo Hye-won
- Kim Ji-young - tteokbokki-selling grandma
- Lee Sang-woo - Kang Bong-kyu
- Ahn Nae-sang - Seo Yoon-oh
- Lee Dae-yeon - Choi Ki-ja
- Jeong Da-hye - Lee Eun-ji
- Jo Yang-ja - Park Soon-nyeo
- Kim Da-rae - Lee Sun-mi
- Lee Han-wi - Director Bang

== Original soundtrack ==
1. Love Song - Jo Won-seon
2. 사랑은 유리같은 것 (Love Is Like Glass) - Park Sun-young
3. 예감 (Presentiment)
4. Memory
5. 나를 잊지 말아요 (Don't Forget Me) - Natural
6. Flown Away
7. 단 한번이라도 (Just Once)
8. So Good Bye
9. 오늘 하루 (Today Is the Day)
10. 스물아홉 혜찬 (29-year-old Hye-chan)
11. Run
12. 열여덟 혜찬 (18-year-old Hye-chan)
13. Snowy
14. Sang-young Story (Guitar ver.)
15. Hye-chan 2
16. Hye-chan 3
17. Love Song (Inst.)
