= List of Nadia: The Secret of Blue Water characters =

This is a list of fictional characters from Nadia: The Secret of Blue Water.

== Nadia ==
Full Name: Nadia La Arwall (ナディア・ラ・アルウォール, Nadia Ra Aruwōru)
Age: 14 (15 toward the end of the series), 18 (movie), 27 (in epilogue)
Born: May 31, 1875
Species: Atlantean (a race that came from M78 to Earth thousands of years ago)
Origin: Tartessos, forgotten city between Europe and Africa now Andalucía Iberia Spain.
Voiced by: Yoshino Takamori (Japanese), Wendee Lee (English, Streamline dub), Meg Bauman (English, ADV Films dub)

Nadia is a 14-year-old (15 toward the end of the series) who works in a circus as an acrobat to survive, since she is an orphan and of unknown origins. She is chased by Grandis and her associates Sanson and Hanson, who are looking for the jewel that Nadia possesses, the Blue Water. While escaping from them, she meets Jean, and from that moment the two of them will be together in the series, where she tries to discover her origins and find out the truth about her past and the Blue Water, the jewel that seems to have an enormous intrinsic power.

Nadia is quite stubborn, easily irritable, socially inept, and has the ability to talk with animals. For example, she is able to communicate easily with her pet lion cub, King. Nadia is also known among those who have knowledge of the Blue Water for being its possessor. Despite her flaws, Nadia is highly moralistic and ethical, frequently calling others out on acts of violence towards other humans or animals, even when it is essential. She even happens to be a strict vegetarian and believes that there is no excuse for eating meat or killing (although her friends attempt to justify their reasons for doing so). Because of her unhappy past, Nadia is even extremely suspicious of all grown-ups—particularly Nemo. As such, she does not know how to act around other people, and sometimes treats them very badly. She misjudges her friends' motivations as well. As a result of her growing love for Jean, however, she comes to learn valuable lessons about friendship, respect, and trust for those around her. On several occasions she is prepared to sacrifice either her life or her freedom to protect her friends.

It turns out the Nadia is the rightful heir to the throne of Atlantis, and that her Blue Water has the power to destroy the world, if it is misused. Ashamed of her fate and regretting both her resentment of Nemo and bad calls of judgment, Nadia impulsively decides to throw her life away... only to be spared by the power of the Blue Water. Jean touches Nadia's heart by telling her that he loves her regardless of who she is, where she is from, and her fate. Inspired, Nadia decides to embrace her fate and is rewarded when she discovers that she can choose how to use the Blue Water's power.

In the epilogue told by a grown-up Marie in the last episode, Nadia has married Jean and they have a child. While Nadia is still a dedicated vegetarian, she is no more aggressively so (as evidenced from her meals of meat and fish for Jean and their son).

== Jean ==
Full Name: Jean Roque Lartigue (ジャン・ロック・ラルティーグ, Jan Rokku Rarutīgu)
Age: 14-15, 18 (movie), 27 (in epilogue)
Species: Human
Origin: Le Havre, France
Born: March 28, 1875
Voiced by: Noriko Hidaka (Japanese), Ardwight Chamberlain (English, Streamline dub), Nathan Parsons (English, ADV Films dub)

Jean is a young 14-year-old orphan who fell in love with Nadia ever since he first laid eyes on her; unlike her, however, Jean has a completely different personality and interests. He is very generous, patient, friendly, and devoted to the things he loves, which are his friends and the love for science. He is also a genius inventor, in fact he is capable of creating complex machines at a very young age. Jean's father is a wealthy trader and ship's captain, but was recently lost at sea and is presumed dead. (We later find out that there has been a rash of mysterious disappearances of ships lately and the rumors are that a sea monster has been attacking them) Jean, however, chooses to deny them and is determined to finally find his father along with his big adventure with Nadia to find about the Blue Water. Despite being somewhat awkward when it comes to social graces around the opposite sex (such as giving compliments or lack of awareness in some cases where he is inventing and/or reading when Nadia wants his attention), Jean is genuinely well-behaved and is nice to everyone; even Gargoyle finds something to admire about his courage and cleverness. He is openly honest and brave as well. Jean continually looks on the bright side of things; for example, when his only pair of glasses are broken when Nadia accidentally steps on them, Jean immediately tells her not to worry, that it is God's way of teaching him detachment.

His relationship with Nadia is one of the more central aspects of the show. When they first meet on the Eiffel Tower, Nadia refuses his overtures, but when Jean rescues her, he earns her trust. A close friendship forges between the two of them—Jean is consistently loyal to her and vows to take her to Africa someday. Nadia genuinely appreciates his company and attention to the point where she feels lonely when he gets involved in a project. Later their relationship begins to turn romantic, but Nadia does not know how to express her feelings to him. Nor is she capable of conveying what she wants from him (a compliment for a dress, for instance). This leads to outbursts of anger often misdirected at Jean (in reality cries of frustration at her inability to declare her desires), yet he continually forgives her. Subsequent scenes following rages involve Nadia feeling bad for her actions. For instance, in episode 10, after unfairly laying into Jean when they have to switch rooms, she apologizes to him. When she is not brooding over their relationship, Nadia often goes out of her way to do something nice for him, such as cooking, encouraging him to build a gyrocopter, or comforting him when he grieves about his father (in Episode 16). She is also seen to passionately defend Jean in several instances, such as when she verbally attacks Nemo and his crew for reprimanding Jean for endangering the Nautilus due to an accident with one of his inventions, or even more when she allows herself to be captured by Gargoyle on Marie's Island so that an injured Jean can escape. Likewise, each time Nadia gets into trouble, Jean continually rescues her. Occasionally a disagreement will occur between them about certain issues (notably eating meat or the use of technology vs. nature), but they do not last long. As a result of Jean's love, Nadia is gradually transformed as a person; his optimism overcomes her pessimism, and she becomes more trusting, respectful, and caring of others.

That said, Jean also undergoes some growth as well during the show. For instance, he believes that technology can do no wrong, and is quite disturbed by Nemo's description of the Nautilus being a "killing machine." His faith in technology is crushed when a friend of his sacrifices his life in a contaminated engine room. Furthermore, he learns that his father is gone and there is no point searching for him. At that point, Jean begins to consider quitting inventing until Nadia suggests him to build a gyrocopter. He determines to do so without the aid of grown-ups, straining his friendship with Hanson in the process. Jean eventually realizes that receiving help from grown-ups is just as valuable, and, working together with Hanson, he completes his flying machine and manages to impress Nadia. Furthermore, he is forced to take responsibility for keeping Nadia and Marie alive when they become stranded on a deserted island, going out of his way to provide food, shelter, and care. Jean does not understand why Nadia is so adamant against eating meat, particularly when she mistreats him and Marie for doing so; as such, he is quite confused by her mood swings. It is not until Nadia finally confesses the real reason behind her hatred of meat that he gains a new understanding of her different view of the world. Even when Nadia later admits her true identity and acknowledges her faults, Jean still accepts her as a person.

== Nemo ==
Full Name: Eleusis La Arwall (エルシス・ラ・アルウォール, Erushisu Ra Aruwōru)
Age: 46
Species: Atlantean
Origin: Tartessos, Africa
Born: October 28, 1843
Died: May 31, 1890
Voiced by: Akio Otsuka (Japanese) Jeff Winkless (English, Streamline dub), Ev Lunning, Jr. (English, ADV Films dub)

Nemo is the captain of the submarine called Nautilus, whose purpose is to destroy the Neo-Atlanteans at all costs. He is a mysterious man with a dark past; in fact only step by step we discover that he is Nadia's father and was the king of Tartessos. Though he could have all mankind under his command, he chooses to live peacefully along with them on Earth, as he believes in humans and in their ability to love. While he acts cold and aloof when he first meets Jean, he nonetheless warms up to his outgoing cheerfulness and enthusiasm. Nadia, meanwhile, is very distrustful of him and is quick to accuse him of murder when he shoots a Neo-Atlantean to save her from death. However, she eventually learns to respect Nemo, and, at the end, at last acknowledges him as her father. Nemo then dies after overloading the Neo Nautilis's reactors to blow a passage out of Red Noah, permitting the rest of the cast to return to Earth.

Nemo's name is a reminiscence of the Greek city Eleusis, the place in Greece where the followers of Demeter met annually to initiate members into the ways of the Earth-goddess, and Ra, the sun-god of Heliopolis in ancient Egypt. He is based on Captain Nemo (literally meaning "no man" in Latin). He also bears a striking resemblance to another famous anime captain, Bruno J. Global/Henry J. Gloval of the SDF-1 Macross in Macross/Robotech. Additionally, he wears a uniform similar to Captain Junzo Okita from Space Battleship Yamato/Star Blazers.

== Marie ==
Full Name: Marie en Carlsberg / Marie en Löwenbräu
Age: 4-5, 8 (movie), 17 (in epilogue)
Species: Human
Origin: Marseille, France
Born: April 10, 1885
Voiced by: Yuko Mizutani (Japanese), Cheryl Chase, (English, Streamline dub), Margaret Cassidy (English, ADV Films dub)

Marie is a 4-year-old French child living in the Cape Verde Islands who is orphaned by the hands of Gargoyle and the Neo-Atlantean troops, who killed her parents. She is soon found by Nadia and Jean, who decide to keep her and to take good care of her. Although she is a kid, Marie is a very strong character, who is at the same time a child but also acts like an adult in difficult situations. She has a good relationship with King, her playmate; in fact, she later comes to see themselves as husband and wife, and Nadia and Jean as her new parents. Later on, however, she develops an interest in Sanson; in fact, in the epilogue, when a 17-year-old Marie tells what has happened to all the characters, she finishes her story by telling that she has married him and is expecting their first child.

The spelling of her name is uncertain. In the episode guide she appears as "Marie", in the Japanese series books she is "Mary", Streamline Pictures calls her "Mari", and in episode 24 she signs one of her drawings as "Marry" (though this could simply be that as a four-year-old she does not know how to spell her name). Even so, Marie is probably the most accurate spelling, as it is the French one.

In the CD audio dramas, her full name was revealed to be "Marie en Carlsberg" (マリー・エン・カールスバーグ, Marī en Kārusubāgu), whereas in the anime's epilogue, it is "Marie en Löwenbräu" (マリー・エン・レーヴェンブロイ, Marī en Rēvenburoi). (Both Carlsberg and Löwenbräu are, incidentally, names of two famous German brewery brands.)

== King ==
Species: Lion
Origin: Africa
Voiced by: Toshiharu Sakurai (Japanese), Carl Macek (English, Streamline dub), Shawn Sides (English, ADV Films dub)

King is a small lion, and he is Nadia's best friend before she meets Jean and the others. He eventually becomes Marie's playmate during the series, playing with her all day. He is very jealous, especially when Nadia and Jean become more intimate.

In the epilogue, King is still living with a now married Nadia and Jean, and has several cubs of his own.

== Grandis ==
Full Name: Grandis Granva (グランディス・グランバァ, Gurandisu Guranbā)
Age: 28-29, 32 (movie), 41 (in epilogue)
Born: 1861
Species: Human
Origin: Italy
Voiced by: Kumiko Takizawa (Japanese), Melanie MacQueen (English, Streamline dub), Sarah Richardson (English, ADV Films dub)

Grandis is a 28-year-old who grew up in a royal Italian family. At first she was a rather rich, spoiled and powerful young woman, but later when she was tricked by her first husband, who married her just for her money until he leaves her broke and alone. After her frail mistake she is exiled by her relatives and the only people who remained faithful and loyal to her were Hanson and Sanson, with whom she then formed the Grandis Gang, a group of jewel thieves. Her life and behavior change dramatically when she meets Nadia and the others; having to first steal the Blue Water, then wanting to protect the children after finding out she has a soft spot for them after learning about their troubles with Gargoyle. Once aboard the Nautilus she falls hopelessly in love with Captain Nemo, sparking a strict rivalry with Electra. She tries to seduce Nemo with any power she has until the very end, but her love for him is never returned.

In the epilogue, a grown-up Marie tells us that Grandis is alive and well, but still looking for a serious and stable love. Yet, she is quite popular though with men and is seen at the end in a golf court surrounded by a large group of ardent admirers. Every man there offers her to use their club, and according to Marie, "Grandis is always gallivanting around."

== Sanson ==
Species: Human
Age: 27-28, 31 (movie), 40 (in epilogue)
Born: February 22, 1862
Origin: Nice, France
Voiced by: Ken'yû Horiuchi (Japanese), Tom Wyner (English, Streamline dub), Martin Blacker (English, ADV Films dub)

Sanson (サンソン, Sanson) is the brawn side of the team and serves as the Gratan's navigator/ pilot. Despite his slight yet muscular build, his strength overcomes even the most powerful of mecha. When he was younger, he was slimmer and girls made fun of him; as he trained day by day, he became stronger but incredibly vain. Sanson also is an outstanding marksman. He was the chauffeur to Granva's family before they lost their fortune, and he remains faithful to her until the end of the series. In the epilogue, he has married a 17-year-old Marie and they are expecting their first child.

His name is reminiscent of the biblical figure Samson, who appears in The Book of Judges Chapter 13 - 16., which tells the story of an unusually strong man, but if he were to cut his hair he would be breaking his promise with God and therefore lose all his strength. The Sanson in the series is very vain and pays particular attention to his hair.

== Hanson ==
Species: Human
Age: 26-27, 31 (movie), 40 (in epilogue)
Born: September 30, 1862
Origin: Nice, France
Voiced by: Toshiharu Sakurai (Japanese), Steve Kramer (English, Streamline dub), Corey Gagne (English, ADV Films dub)

Hanson (ハンソン, Hanson) is the mechanic of the Grandis Gang. He has exceptional skills; he built the Gratan and many other devices. He is in love with Electra, but alas, his love is not returned. Jean and Hanson become close friends thanks to their mutual fascination with technology, they spend a lot of time together discussing technical details and ideas about mecha.

In the epilogue, Hanson has become a rich and respected industrial giant and lives in the fictional world's equivalent of the Chrysler Building. Having made his fortune as a manufacturer of automobiles, he still claims that he will find a girlfriend someday.

== Electra ==
Full Name: Medina La Lugensius Electra (メディナ・ラ・ルゲンシウス・エレクトラ, Medina Ra Rugenshiusu Erekutora)
Age: 26-27, 30 (movie), 39 (in epilogue)
Species: Human
Born: 1863
Origin: Tartessos, Africa now Andalucía Iberia Spain
Voiced by: Kikuko Inoue (Japanese), Edie Mirman (English, Streamline dub), Jennifer Stuart (English, ADV Films dub)

Electra is 26 years old and was orphaned in the destruction of her hometown. She was saved by Captain Nemo and is his first officer and second-in-command on the Nautilus. She and Nemo share a past experience that is never fully explained. Electra is deeply in love with Nemo, although she also harbors a deep grudge towards him for the deaths of her family. She becomes extremely jealous of Grandis' infatuation for the Captain, igniting a heated rivalry between them for his love. She grows fond of Jean and his determination to learn about technology, seeing something of her long lost brother in him. Nadia, on the other hand, detests Electra and becomes increasingly (and irrationally) jealous of Jean's friendship with the First Officer (her inability to express her concern to Jean nearly ruins their own relationship); likewise, Electra fears that Nadia will somehow steal Nemo's heart away from her. Eventually, however, both girls open up to one another and become friends.

At the end of the series, Electra is revealed to be pregnant with Nemo's child, and Marie reveals in the epilogue that she gave birth to a son and raised him with love, like Nemo asked her.

== Gargoyle ==
Full Name: Nemesis La Algol (ネメシス・ラ・アルゴール, Nemeshisu Ra Arugōru)
Age: 45-46
Species: Human
Born: July 21, 1843
Died: May 31, 1890
Origin: Tartessos, Africa
Voiced by: Motomu Kiyokawa (Japanese), Steve Bulen (English, Streamline dub), David Jones (English, ADV Films dub)

Gargoyle is the head of the Neo-Atlantean forces. He was the prime minister of Tartessos, and his main objectives are:

1. Destroy Nemo and the Nautilus,
2. Take possession of the Blue Water
3. Dominate over the entire world and humans, whom he considers inferior.

He considers himself an Atlantean, and is not aware that he was created by Atlantean technology and is in fact one of the humans whom he despises. He is a cunning and brutal villain who speaks in a soft voice and taps into other people's weaknesses to make them comply with his wishes. His face remains behind the mask he wears until the final episode (and even then, his face is only briefly shown before he dies, disintegrating to salt).

His name, like Nemo and Electra, is taken from Latin and Greek mythology. In the first Italian dub, he is called Argo.

== Emperor Neo ==
Full Name: Benusis La Arwall (ビナシス・ラ・アルウォール, Binashisu Ra Aruwōru); aka Neo Icon Epiphanes (ネオ・イコン・エピファネス, Neo Ikon Epifanesu)
Age: 19
Species: Atlantean, Mecha
Born: December 29, 1870
Died: May 31, 1890
Origin: Tartessos, Africa
Voiced by: Kaneto Shiozawa (Japanese), Dan Dietz (English, ADV Films dub)

Emperor Neo is apparently the leader of the Neo-Alanteans. Later in the story we discover that he is Nemo's son and Nadia's brother who was placed as Emperor of Neo Atlantis through a coup d'état perpetrated by Gargoyle to dethrone Nemo; his body was destroyed in the collapse of Tartessos, and was mechanically recreated by Gargoyle. Gargoyle is able to control him like a puppet. Under Gargoyle's control, and against his own will, he is forced to try to take over the world using his psychic powers and technology and eventually shoot his own father. In the end he is able to regain his free will and, in a final act of love for his family, sacrifices himself to save Nadia.

== Ayerton ==
Full Name: Ayerton Grenavan (エアトン・グレナバン, Eaton Gurenaban)
Age: 28-29, 33 (movie), 42 (in epilogue)
Species: Human
Born: November 15, 1860
Origin: London, United Kingdom
Voiced by: Kôichi Yamadera (episode 3), Kôji Tsujitani (episodes 15-39) (Japanese), Bob Bergen (English, Streamline dub), Jason Phelps (English, ADV Films dub)

Ayerton is first seen in the series as a scientific officer aboard US warship Abraham; he states he has been sent on a secret mission to investigate the sea monsters phenomena. Later in the series, Jean and Nadia meet him again partially buried on a mysterious moving island, completely drunk and telling stories about a strange witch who inhabits the island (who naturally turns out to be Grandis). While on the island, Ayerton falls in love with Grandis and pretends to be an English nobleman who's going to inherit a large wealth from his family to impress her.

Ayerton is quite a weird, loudmouthed character, who is never really able to completely grasp the reality around him, or to tell good from evil. In the epilogue, Marie says that Ayerton really was a noble and wealthy, and eventually he returned to his homeland.

== Eiko Villan ==
Full Name: Eiko Villan (エーコー・ウィラン, Ēkō Wiran)
Age: 20, 24 (movie), 33 (in epilogue)
Species: Human
Born: June 12, 1869
Origin: Le Havre, France
Voiced by: Yasunori Matsumoto (Japanese), Kerrigan Mahan (English, Streamline dub), Greg Gondek (English, ADV Films dub)

Eiko is Nautilus' sonar operator and founder of Ikolina's fan club. In episode 16, Eiko reveals that he is the sole survivor of the shipwreck of Elise Le Havre, Jean's father's ship.

== Mecha ==
=== Gratan / Catherine ===
Designed and built from scratch by skilled mechanic Hanson, Gratan is a small multi-purpose vehicle: it has wheels for ground movement, but may also fly using a hot-air balloon and propellers, and even travel underwater. Its configuration can be switched by the pilot using a piano keyboard in the cockpit. Gratan, whose original meaning is "Grandis' tank", is the common name for the vehicle, while Grandis prefers to call it Catherine. After being damaged and repaired countless times during the series, Gratan is eventually crushed by the igniter of Red Noah's Light of Babel, a sacrifice necessary to avoid destruction of a defenseless Excelion.

=== Nautilus (Eltreum) ===
An Atlantean space-ship converted to submarine, Nautilus is Nemo's main weapon against Gargoyle and his minions. Notable features of this ship are: ability to withstand high pressures and depths, exceptionally resistant Space Titanium armoured hull (the clear ports are made from Tektite), and water-jet magnetic propulsion.

The name of the original spaceship was Eritrium, as is discovered by Jean and Nadia in episode 15, while the origin of the Nautilus is explained at the end of the series. Eritrium (sometimes spelled Elitrium or Eltrium) is also the name of a space ship in Gunbuster, and the robot-ship that blast off at the end of Otaku no Video.

=== New Nautilus (Excelion) ===
One of Atlantis' most powerful warships, it was reactivated by Nemo's crew (after 12,000 years of disuse) after the demise of Nautilus in episodes 21 and 22. New Nautilus' Orpheus engine draws power from aberrations in the gravitational field of two black holes orbiting one around the other. The ship has other weapon systems which were damaged in previous battles, and cannot be repaired. (Excelion is also the name of one of the most powerful ships in Gunbuster.)

=== Red Noah ===
One of the three space-arks used by Atlanteans to leave their home in Nebula M78 and come to the Earth. It is disguised as a moving island on which episodes 27-31 take place. Red Noah finally reveals its nature as a giant flying saucer operated by a sentient android, when Nadia and Jean enter the ship in episodes 30-31. Eventually Red Noah is retrieved by Gargoyle who intends to use it as a final weapon for the restoration of Neo Atlantis and the subjugation of the human race.

Nebula M78 is likely a reference to the Ultraman franchise. Red Noah's analogy to the Blue Water is very similar to a similar quote from Go Nagai's Mazinger Z. Series director Hideaki Anno has claimed he was a fan of both franchises.
