= Petite Princess Yucie =

Japanese anime television series

- Box art of Petite Princess Yucie

ぷちぷり＊ユーシィ (Puchi Puri Yūshī)
- Created by: Takami Akai
- Anime television series
- Directed by: Masahiko Otsuka
- Written by: Hiroyuki Yamaga; Jukki Hanada
- Studio: Gainax, AIC
- Licensed by: NA: AEsir Holdings
- Original network: NHK
- Original run: September 30, 2002 – March 24, 2003
- Episodes: 26
- Manga

Puchi Puri Yuushi
- Written by: Ramyu Ryuki
- Published by: Kadokawa Shoten
- Imprint: Asuka Comics
- Published: November 16, 2002
- Volumes: 1
- Manga

Kanzenban Puchi Puri Yuushi
- Written by: Ramyu Ryuki
- Published by: Kadokawa Shoten
- Imprint: Kadokawa Comics Ace
- Published: November 1, 2004
- Volumes: 1

Petite Princess Yucie (ぷちぷり＊ユーシィ, Puchi Puri Yūshī) is an anime series, which was produced by Gainax, aired from 2002 to 2003, and ran for 26 episodes. The story centers on Yucie, a 17-year-old who is trapped in a 10-year-old's body, and follows her and her friends, all of whom are designated as Platinum Princess candidates. A Platinum Princess receives the Eternal Tiara, which grants any wish, but only to the one it judges worthy and only one wish. The anime was licensed by ADV Films in North America. As of September 1, 2009, the series is now licensed by ADV's successor, AEsir Holdings; with distribution from Section23 Films.

The show is loosely based on Princess Maker franchise, sharing the same character designer (Takami Akai) and many of the plot elements, such as franchise regular Cube (serving as the player's butler in each game) also appearing as the butler of Yucie.

== Plot summary ==
Country-girl Yucie is admitted by chance to the prestigious Princess Academy, where the daughters of royalty and nobles attend to learn magic, dance, etiquette, defense, art and music. She embarks on a quest to collect the "fragments" of the Eternal Tiara in hopes that she may become the legendary Platinum Princess, who is chosen every 1,000 years. Yucie, along with the four other rivaling Princess candidates, must grow in heart to become worthy of the Tiara. Yucie is a spunky heroine who, despite her common lifestyle, is actually the daughter of a noble and former hero who has retreated from courtly life and lives in the countryside. She was discovered as a baby when Gunbard, the former Hero, found her during a battle.

The fragments take the form of Crystal Flowers and are scattered throughout the five worlds; Human, Demon, Heaven, Spirit, and Fairy. Strangely enough, the five candidates Yucie, Glenda, Elmina, Cocoloo and Beth are representatives of these five existing worlds. As the legend goes, once the Eternal Tiara is complete, it will select the Princess from the worthy candidates and grant her one wish.

Blindly pursuing her lifelong desire to grow up and be treated like an adult, Yucie must prove her worthiness to the Tiara and sets out to do community service as part of the academy's special Curriculum for the candidates, such as tending flowers, babysitting a giant fluff ball, helping to run an old church, helping to run a bakery, and overseeing a kindergarten picnic. Each task seems easy at first, but problems abound. It is later discovered that all the candidates are under the same 10-year-old "curse" and their rivalry quickly turns into admiration for one another's determination in reaching their common goal. Yucie and her friends each have a reason for desperately wanting to become the Platinum Princess.

In a side-story arc, Yucie is also hoping to find clues about the lost prince of the Human realm, who once saved her life while she was lost in the forest, looking for Sunset Blossoms, and whom she wishes to meet in person some day to thank him. Her memory of him is vague, and he was an adolescent at the time, so she has no idea what he may look like now or what kind of person he has become. When she encounters a young man named Arc during one of her odd jobs who looks so familiar; she has conflicted feelings. Arc is rude, patronizing, unfeeling and insensitive, yet she feels drawn to him. The prince was her childhood romantic ideal, but her seventeen-year-old heart falls for Arc. However, Arc is actually Prince Arrow in disguise.

As the girls continue to grow emotionally, their Platinum Princess candidate pendants grow in beauty and brightness as well, reflecting how much wisdom they have obtained. Yucie and the others finally realize why the Fairy World princess was so troubled and uncooperative when Beth reveals that her father, King of the Fairy Realm, is dying. The girls are resolved in helping their friend and saving the Fairy Realm by defeating the ancient evil Diablo who threatens the existence of all the worlds. With the combined help of their stewards and friends, the girls succeed with the power they obtained as candidates, but the prince is badly injured.

The final test begins, in which a magical judge will oversee the Tiara's choice. Yucie's only wish now is to save the prince with the power of the Tiara.

Upon entering the place of judgment, Yucie and her friends meet a mysterious figure. Out of friendship for Yucie, and to support her wish to save Prince Arrow, Glenda, Cocoloo, Elmina, and Beth all renounce their candidacy, making Yucie the only choice. The Tiara accepts Yucie as its new master. However, the girls realize that those not chosen by the Tiara will vanish. Yucie refuses to accept the Tiara when she learns this and tells the others she is determined to save the Prince some other way.

After careful thought, Glenda, Cocoloo, Elmina, and Beth ask the judge to erase Yucie's memories of them, so that she can return to the Human Realm in time to save the prince. In a tearful final goodbye, Glenda, perhaps Yucie's strongest rival, tells her to never forget to be her cheerful self. After Yucie leaves, the remaining four sketch a portrait of themselves and Yucie on a stone slab, in remembrance of their friendship, and disappear.

Yucie returns to save Prince Arrow and collapses from exhaustion. The Eternal Tiara disappears after its owner makes her wish, its power quelled by Yucie's strength of heart. Yucie awakens to the keen sense that she has lost something of great importance to her, but cannot remember what. Her father, Gunbard, feels responsible for her misery, since he was the one who put the Tiara together and restarted the Legend in their lifetime. With the help of the fathers of the missing girls, he opens the gateway to the place of judgment so Yucie and Prince Arrow can retrieve what was lost.

Yucie faces the cloaked figure once more and demands that what was lost be returned. The ruined empty world that was the place of judgment is actually the lost Magic World, a sixth realm. The judge was actually a Platinum Princess Candidate 1,000 years ago, a princess of the Magic Realm, who refused the Tiara to save her friends, but lost her friends and her world to destruction as a result.

Yucie finds Cocoloo's drawing, which breaks the judge's spell and unlocks her memories. The princess of the Magic Realm chides Yucie for not accepting her fate, but Yucie tells her how important friends are, as they are her true strength. With her power as the Platinum Princess, her tears shine brightly on the ground, causing a miracle.

All the spirits of the Magic Realm rush to Yucie, who can now hear them. She tells the princess of the Magic Realm that all who died there still love her, and that they have always been with her these 1,000 years, and they never regretted fighting alongside her to the very end. The judge realizes that she had never been alone and that she had made the right choice in trying to save her friends. Yucie's power covers the ground with Sunset Blossoms, and a Crystal Flower emerges from the ground to the hands of the Princess of the Magic Realm. The sixth and final fragment is added to the Eternal Tiara. Together, the former and present Plantinum Princess combine their strength to make Yucie's wish come true. The Magic Realm finally collapses after its last princess, smiling with joy, disappears.

In the end, Yucie and her friends are readmitted into the academy. With the curse lifted, and the Eternal Tiara again fragmented and sealed, they can finally grow up and enjoy their mutual friendship.

== Characters ==
=== Platinum Princess Candidates ===
Yucie (ユーシィ, Yūshii)
Voiced by: Maria Yamamoto (Japanese); Rachel Rivera (English)
Similar to the classic Princess Maker tradition, Yucie was found as an infant by the knight Gunbard after a battle, and became his adopted daughter. Due to an unknown curse, she stopped growing at the age of ten, and looks like a child although she is now seventeen. Yucie is very cheerful and gregarious, but she has a very strong desire to break her curse and become an adult. One of the reasons is that she often feels that being small in size is a hindrance to others, thus wishing to grow up. Yucie becomes a Platinum Princess candidate after she sees the light of the Eternal Tiara, which is not visible to others. It is also said that she is the princess of the Human World, as shown in the last episode. Although there is no evidence to prove it, her adoptive father, Gunbard, recognizes her as the princess of the collapsed castle during the battle he was last involved in, as he saw Yucie descending on a forest near the ruins. When she met Arc, she got mad at him for calling her huge forehead but falls in love with him later on. She starts to recognize Arc as the prince who saved her as a child. Her theme color is orange.
Glenda (グレンダ, Gurenda)
Voiced by: Yuki Matsuoka (Japanese); Kelley Huston (English)
As Princess of the Demon World (Underworld), Glenda was fiercely competitive and has strong magical powers. She immediately butted heads with Yucie, her rival to become the Platinum Princess. Glenda was a bragger who frequently proclaims herself as"fantastic" and "elegant", and was also often selfish, jealous, and temperamental. But she has a sweet side which she tries to hide, when they went to Underworld when the Kobolds welcomed them, and eventually becomes very close friends with Yucie (perhaps, even overly protective of her), even though she denies to admit it. Throughout her friendship with her new friends, she changes to more honestly enjoy friendship and have fun with her friends. She is seventeen, but like the others, has the body of a ten-year-old, although she looks rather developed. She desires to be the platinum princess because she wishes to become an adult. She believes if she becomes an adult, her dad will do his job as lord of the Demon World properly, her mother would return, and she would have the power to protect all of the demons living in the demon world. Her theme color is red.
Cocoloo (ココルー, Kokorū)
Voiced by: Yukari Fukui (Japanese); Monika Bustamante (English)
Cocoloo is a soft-spoken young woman who becomes Yucie's friend very early in the series. She is a fellow student at the Princess Academy (later revealed to be the Princess of the Spirit World), who wears tiny spectacles at the end of her nose, with her chief characteristics being self-effacing, self-humiliating and gentle. Cocoloo is so gentle that she is often ignored and talked-over by the much louder Yucie and Glenda, which causes Cocoloo to lament that she "has no presence after all" (Which is rather ironic, as Cocoloo is the princess of the Spirit World). However, Cocoloo is amazingly kind and encouraging towards her friends, which makes an impression on everyone who gets to know her. She also suffers from a curse that makes her look ten, even though she is seventeen. Due to her being a Spirit, almost all physical attacks are useless on her, just as shown when Diabolos' tentacle tried in vain to impale her. Her theme color is blue.
Elmina (エルミナ, Erumina)
Voiced by: Ayako Kawasumi (Japanese); Leigh Anderson Fisher (English)
As the Princess of Heaven (Celestial Realm), Elmina wears white robes and has wings. Elmina is very studious and fastidious, even emotionless and monotonous voice, and a bit of a humorless goody-two-shoes. When she was younger, her stern father (who is the King of Heaven) would not tolerate imperfection. Elmina tries very hard to be perfect, and she is also very hard on herself whenever she makes a mistake. Once she makes a mistake or believes she failed, she will be depressed and lose her confidence to keep going, because of her sad memories with her father in the past, leading her to have an emotionless expression. With her new friends at the Princess Academy, Elmina slowly learns to be more secure and not to give up, even when she fails. Elmina is also the tallest of the 5 candidates. Looks ten, but is actually seventeen as a result of the same curse. Her theme color is pink.
Beth (ベス, Besu)
Voiced by: Fumiko Orikasa (Japanese); Lee Eddy (English)
Beth is the princess of the fairy world. She is very athletic, stubborn, and has strong magical powers (The helmet she wears acts as an amplifier for her magic). Although she is also a Platinum Princess candidate, she left the Princess Academy after an evil force named Diabolos attacked her world. She is so determined to become the Platinum Princess that she once kidnapped Cocoloo and tries to force her to give up on her candidacy. As a result of difficulties she is suffering in her world, she refuses the offers of friendship from the other girls and regards them as her enemies. Due to this attitude, the residents of the fairy world regard her as dangerous. However, after many meetings with the other girls, Beth learns to open up and accepts the other candidates' friendship, for which the most thanks can go to Cocoloo. Diabolos was later defeated by the power of the heart of Yucie, Elmina, Cocoloo, Glenda and herself. Her father in a form of tree which supports the fairy world and trapped Diabolos inside him before the girls came to help defeat it, with Arc hurt. She also suffers from a curse that traps her in a ten-year-old's body, even though she is actually seventeen. Her theme color is green.

=== Supporting ===
Gunbard (ガンバード, Ganbādo)
Voiced by: Kenyuu Horiuchi (Japanese); Robert Matney (English)
Gunbard was the person who found Yucie as an infant after a battle in which he led personally and raised her as his own daughter. He was once a legendary knight who completed an impossible task, and is often referred to as "the Hero Gunbard". But now he spends all his time doting and spoiling Yucie and is always cooking her large amounts of food which she does not always appreciate. Gunbard, fondly called "Papa" by Yucie, may have a mysterious connection with Queen Ercell as well as one to the Eternal Tiara itself. It is found out later that he is the one to have completed the Eternal Tiara, which was then separated in different parts and scattered around the different worlds, which he conquered the challenges and assembled it. At the same time, it was found out later that he was the first lover of Queen Ercell. This is also the reason why he wanted to complete the Eternal Tiara, so that he can gain a title, enough estate and knighthood in order to propose to Ercell. However, when he returned upon the completion of the Tiara, he found out that Ercell has already married (to the man who became King) and already had a son. Disheartened, he left Ercell's armor and sword in the palace and he continues to serve the kingdom until he met Yucie in the middle of a forest during a battle and quits his career to raise her. Gunbard may be Arc's biological father, which the old man denies, but may have simply wanted Arc to remember the King as his "real" father, since he was the one who raised and cared for him, just as Gunbard is Yucie's "real" father. Contrary to popular belief, he is not blind, just he was never shown opening his eyes, except when he found Yucie. He owns the house near the lake on the edge of a forest, which he built for him and Ercell. He also has a very cheerful and positive attitude, even though Yucie hates his caring attitude. He only shows his serious attitude, when he was informed about his daughter's problem.
Cube (キューブ, Kyūbu)
Voiced by: Tomo Saeki (Japanese); Josh Meyer (English)
A demon and a loyal steward to both Yucie and her father, Gunbard, Cube is able to summon magical items through sorcery and paying a magic hand with gold coins, with which he helps Yucie out in several occasions. He is one of Yucie's best friends. During the story, we learn that Cube was formerly Glenda's steward, but has been banished from the Demon World by her (Glenda's) mother for unknown reason. He was found by Gunbard and he serves his family as a steward, especially to Yucie which he serves loyally.
Queen Ercell (エルセル女王, Eruseru Ojōu)
Voiced by: Kikuko Inoue (Japanese); Cyndi Williams (English)
Queen Ercell, in addition to being queen, is also the principal of the Princess Academy, and the keeper of the Eternal Tiara. She is in charge of finding the Platinum Princess candidates and guiding them through their tasks, as well leading other princesses and noble's daughters. She clearly seems to recognize Gunbard by the gasp she makes when Yucie announces she is his daughter to Queen Ercell, but what connection Queen Ercell might have remains is kept somewhat mysterious for much of the series. But Gunbard was actually Ercell's former lover many years ago. Gunbard went to gather the parts of the Eternal Tiara in all 5 worlds so that he becomes a knight would be able to marry Ercell, as he was just a commoner with a small patch of land, to his dismay, when he returned, Ercell was already married and has a child.
Arc (アルク, Aruku)
Voiced by: Takayuki Yamaguchi (Japanese); Joey Hood (English)
Arc is a mysterious young man dressed in a cape and fedora. He first meets Yucie when he seeks shelter at a church at which she is temporarily working. It turns out that he is being sought by the castle guards, which alarms Yucie. Although Yucie is very saucy towards Arc, she finds herself drawn to him. Arc heroically saves Yucie when they encounter a demon from the Demon World. He also calls her "Huge Forehead" to tease her about her big forehead, much to her consternation. After kissing her on her forehead a few times, he finally gives her a real kiss, which is witnessed by her friends. Arc is also hunting for the one that first put together the Eternal Tiara, which he feels will lead him to his real father. In reality, he is Prince Arrow, son of Queen Ercell. This is in fact the reason he is being sought by guards, as he escaped from the castle to find his 'biological father'. At the same time, he is the prince that once saved Yucie when she was in danger when they were small. Later on, it was shown that Arc also has feelings for Yucie. He defeated what the Magic World failed and Fairy King failed to seal, but not being corrupted by it. Yucie used the Eternal Tiara to cure him of the curse.
Gaga (ガガ)
Voiced by: Kouji Ishii (Japanese); Jason Liebrecht (English)
Gaga is Glenda's steward. He is a seven-foot-tall black-bodied cat-like demon with long, silver hair. This very old man demon has occasional accidents when his hip goes out and can make long-winded lectures that can put anyone listening to sleep, much to his annoyance, which Cube got the most number of punishments. Always loyal without question, Gaga takes great pride in being a steward. He also has the ability to transform into a black, red-eyed cat with bat-like wings. He replaced Cube as Glenda's steward earlier when the former was banished by the Demon Queen. He also neither hates nor likes Cube for the latter's absence in the Demon World and sees him serving a lowly Human.
Chawoo (チャウ, Chau)
Voiced by: Chiaki Maeda (Japanese); Shawn Sides (English)
Cocoloo's steward. Chawoo is a ghost who often hides in her shadow, so the other characters do not meet him until well into the series. He is very devoted to Cocoloo and will always defend her. However, being too devoted to Cocoloo, he is often seem extremely exaggerating events to others, even to much of the extent of lying, and always transforming as Cocoloo, trying to fool Nikolai and fooling the denizens of the Spirit World of his master's experiences in the Human World. He speaks with a heavy Kansai dialect.
Belbel (ベルベル, Beruberu)
Voiced by: Tomoko Kaneda (Japanese); Larissa Wolcott (English)
Belbel is a very cute little Tinkerbell-like fairy who is Beth's steward. While she is obedient to Beth, she also tries to talk Beth into giving the other girls a chance which actually ends up working in the end. Most of her sentences end with "desu" (です, "yes" in the English dub).
Balizan (バリザん, Barizan)
Voiced by: Tomohiro Nishimura (Japanese); Robert Fisher (English)
Balizan is a golden-colored robot who is charged bring Elmina's steward. He also acts like a parent on Elmina, due to the King of the Heaven strives his daughter to be perfect and his duty to be a perfect being.
Drago (ドラゴ, Dorago)
Voiced by: Kousei Yagi (Japanese); Guy Harvey (English)
A very old and wise dragon, that lives in the lake near Yucie's home. He is a friend to Yucie. It was revealed that he was formerly a resident from Hell, but left and settled on a lake near Gunbard's estate. His whole body was revealed while holding Diabolos along with Arc/Arrow while the princesses made an idea to defeat the curse. Has a dragon hatchling alongside him named Jing.
Demon King (魔王, Maō)
Voiced by: Kenji Utsumi (Japanese); David Frank Jones (English)
Glenda's father, he is pleasant and cheerful. He is an extremely doting father, much to the disgust of Glenda, which wants her father to be the Demon King he is, a strict and powerful leader. He also has a collection of orbs that contains recorded scenes from his daughter's achievements, in which he obsessively cherishes. He doesn't even know Cube was banished in Hell. Always suffers back pains, which Cube massages.
King of Heaven (天界王, Tenkaiō)
Voiced by: Iemasa Kayumi (Japanese); Ev Lunning, Jr. (English)
Elmina's father, he is strict. He wants his daughter to be perfect, to the point of being disappointed seeing her failure. But he smiled when reading a letter from Elmina, revealing that he cares for his daughter.
Fairy King (妖精王, Yōseiō)
Voiced by: Yoshito Yasuhara (Japanese); Christopher Loveless (English)
Beth's father. To protect Fairy World from Diabolos, the Fairy King turned himself into a giant tree to seal it. He is also a handsome, green-haired man. Reveals his true form during Yucie's dream.
Spirit King (霊界王, Reikaiō)
Spirit King
Leader of the Spirit World and Cocoloo's father. He was shown in Yucie's dream and seen always covering his face with a book.
Frederick
Voiced by: Hiroaki Hirata (Japanese); Jose Hernandez (English)
Queen Ercell's personal bodyguard, currently in charge of searching for the Prince, who turns out to be Arc/Arrow. Loyal and reliable, he even let the prince do what he wants, even letting him and Yucie escape.
Maga Selent
Voiced by: Chisa Yokoyama (Japanese); Ellie McBride (English)
A mysterious identity that watches the Platinum Princess Candidates and maintains Queen Ercell's mediator. But it was later revealed that she was a Platinum Princess and she is the last survivor of an ancient kingdom, centered in magic that was destroyed by the same corruption called Diabolos more than a thousand that almost befell Beth's kingdom. She was cursed to live until the next Princess will be revealed. She blamed herself over the loss of her friends and her world, but comforted by the very same souls of her friends that never blame her for their demise. For that, she was released in her cursed kid's body.
Diabolos
The series' main antagonist. Causes Maga Selent's kingdom to collapse when he corrupts it. The Fairy King seals him in a tree when he tried to corrupt the Fairy World. Dies when Arrow/Arc defeats him, but not making him suffer a corrupting wound.

== Production ==
Takami Akai, the character designer for the Princess Maker series of games (also by Gainax), was the character designer and original creator for Yucie. Thus, there are many similarities between characters in the Princess Maker games and this series. Of note, Yucie's appearance is based on Lisa, the daughter from Princess Maker 3; the judge in the final episode has the same appearance as Maria, the daughter from Princess Maker 1; and the young Queen Ercell has the same appearance as Olive, the daughter from Princess Maker 2.

In addition, 'Cube' is the player's butler in Princess Maker 2, Princess Maker 4, and Princess Maker 5. In the anime, Cube is also Yucie's butler and has a nearly identical design.

=== List of episodes ===
No.	Title	Original release date
1	"A New Platinum Princess Candidate" "Tanjō! Purachina Purinsesu kōho" (誕生！プラチナプリンセス候補)	September 30, 2002
2	"A Rival? Yucie Goes to School" "Raibaru toujou! Yuushi, gakkou e iku" (ライバル登場！ユーシィ、学校へ行く)	October 7, 2002
3	"Exciting First Job" "Dokidoki! Hajimete no arubaito!" (ドキドキ！初めてのアルバイト！)	October 14, 2002
4	"What'll I Do?! Hairball Panic" "Dōshiyō? Kedama panikku!" (どうしよう？毛玉パニック！)	October 21, 2002
5	"Memories... A Garden from a Time Far Away" "Memorii... Tooi hi no kaen" (メモリー･････遠い日の花園)	October 28, 2002
6	"Could It Be Him? The Encounter Comes Without Notice" "Moshikashite!? Deai wa totsuzen yattekita" (もしかして！？出会いは突然やってきた)	November 11, 2002
7	"Oh, Meow? The Demon World is Full of Cats" "Nyanto? Makai wa neko bakari" (ニャンと？魔界はネコばかり)	November 18, 2002
8	"Sparkle, the Me Within Myself" "Kirameite, watashi no naka watashi" (きらめいて、私の中のワタシ)	November 25, 2002
9	"Perfection? Enter the Princess of Heaven" "Pāfekuto? Tenkai no hime genru!" (パーフェクト？天界の姫現る!)	December 2, 2002
10	"Is it Destiny? The Library Re-Encounter" "Unmei? Saikai no raiburarii" (運命？再会のライブラリー)	December 9, 2002
11	"Thoughts Will Get There - The Girl I Met at the Beach" "Omoi wa todoku nagisa de deatta shōjo" (思いは届く 渚で出会った少女)	December 16, 2002
12	"Challenge! Heaven Triathlon" "Chōsen! Tenkai toraiasuron" (挑戦！天界トライアスロ)	December 23, 2002
13	"Romance! The Magic of Love Arrives Without Notice" "Romansu! Koi no mahou wa totsuzen ni" (ロマンス！恋の魔法は突然に)	December 30, 2002
14	"One Mystery After Another! The Fairy World Princess" "Nazo mata nazo! Yoseikai no purinsesu" (謎また謎！妖精界のプリンセス)	January 6, 2003
15	"Petite Princesses Reborn! New Tasks" "Shinsei puchipuri! Aratanaru kadai" (新生ぷちぷり！新たなる課題)	January 13, 2003
16	"Harvest Festival - Yucie's Decision" "Shūkakusai Yūshī no ketsui!" (収穫祭 ユーシィの決意)	January 20, 2003
17	"How Annoying! The Fairy World is Full of Lies" "Daimeiwaku! Yoseikai wa uso darake" (大迷惑！妖精界はウソだらけ)	January 27, 2003
18	"Blazing Souls of Stewards! Save Balizan" "Moero shitsuji tamashī! Barizan o suku" (燃えろ執事魂！バリザンを救え)	February 3, 2003
19	"We're Here to Serve You! The Master is a Mr. Stubborn" "Go hōshi shimasu! Goshujin wa henkutsu-sama" (ご奉仕します！ご主人様はヘンクツ様)	February 10, 2003
20	"Confession! A Ball for Two" "Kokuhaku! Futarikiri no budōkai" (告白！二人きりの舞踏会)	February 17, 2003
21	"All Together! A Song to Join Their Hearts" "Zenin shuugou! Kokoro wo tsunagu utagoe" (全員集合！心をつなぐ歌声)	February 24, 2003
22	"Visible? Invisible? Welcome to the Haunted House" "Mieru? Mienai? Yūrei yashiki e irasshai" (見える？見えない！幽霊屋敷へいらっしゃい)	March 3, 2003
23	"To the Fairy World... Light Up Those Five Souls" "Yoseikai e...Kagayake itsu!" (妖精界へ... 輝け5つの心)	March 10, 2003
24	"Graduation... Thoughts Kept Within" "Sotsugyo...Mune ni himeta omoi!" (卒業…… 胸に秘めた思い！)	March 17, 2003
25	"Final Scene! Princess Selection" "Saigo no sēnu! Purinsesu no sentaku" (最後のセーヌ！プリンセスの選択)	March 24, 2003
26	"To the Me Who Will Eventually Be an Adult" "Itsuka otona ni naru watashi e" (いつか大人になる私へ)	March 24, 2003

=== Titles ===
Around episode 14, the ending imagery begins showing images of all five girls instead of images of just Yucie, and while the ending theme title doesn't change, the wording does change slightly. This reverts briefly for episode 19 with the ending imagery returning to what it was before, while the wording remains slightly changed.

== Music ==
Opening theme

- Egao no Tensai by Petite Princesses (Maria Yamamoto, Yuki Matsuoka, Yukari Fukui, Ayako Kawasumi and Fumiko Orikasa)

Ending theme

- Ienai Kara by Yoko Ishida
