= Princess Maker: Faery Tales Come True =

1997 video game

- Box art for the PlayStation release
- Developer: Gainax
- Writer: Takami Akai
- Series: Princess Maker
- Platforms: PlayStation, Windows, Sega Saturn, Dreamcast
- Release: PlayStation; JP: January 24, 1997 Windows 95; JP: May 14, 1998 Sega Saturn; JP: June 18, 1998 Dreamcast; JP: July 19, 2001 Nintendo Switch; JP: December 19, 2019; WW: December 23, 2019 Steam; WW: December 23, 2019
- Genre: Life simulation game

Princess Maker: Faery Tales Come True (プリンセスメーカー ゆめみる妖精, Purinsesu Mēkā Yumemiru Yōsei), also known as Princess Maker 3, is a life simulation video game developed by Gainax and released in Japan in 1997.

The game is the third main entry in the Princess Maker series and departs from earlier titles by centering on the upbringing of a young faery who aspires to become a human princess.

Faery Tales Come True was originally announced during the early months of the PlayStation, with development extending over a prolonged period before release.

Contemporary coverage reported strong sales in Japan, while noting that Western publishers declined localization due to unease with the game's premise. An official English-language release did not arrive until 2017.

== Gameplay ==
=== Premise and structure ===
Faery Tales Come True shifts the series' premise by having the player raise a young faery who desires to become a human princess, rather than a divinely gifted human child. The game removes the RPG-style adventuring segments present in earlier entries and focuses entirely on life simulation. Time is scheduled in 15-day increments rather than monthly, giving finer control over training, work, and stress. The player also selects the father's profession at the start, which affects starting conditions such as income, living environment, and the daughter's initial personality traits. Random events during school and work can significantly affect stress, pride, and other stats.

In this game, everything said to the player's daughter and done will help determine the daughter's attitude, social status, and outlook on life. Unlike the previous games where she was either happy, sick, or rebellious, the daughter's attitude can range from happy, to average, to worried, to spoiled. There are 60 endings in this game ranging from the typical ones like General and Hero, to some more distinctive like Gambler and Freelancer. There are also many "magical" endings, with not only the princess ending, but princess of darkness, cats, etc. She can also marry a variety of people.

=== Education and courses ===
The game offers a total of nine study courses, including regular school, church, martial arts, dance, cooking, music, painting, and etiquette, each with distinct costs, skill improvements, and effects on stress and personality. Church, which had previously been a part-time job in earlier titles, is reclassified as a course.

All courses, save for church and fasting sessions, will challenge the daughter with a test/exam based on her status and how long she has dedicated herself to the course. The result of the test/exam will be directly proportional to the daughter's status. Once the result is announced, her reaction will depend on her overall status. The daughter's reactions vary, and it may or may not have effect on status for better or for worse.

All courses, save for church and fasting sessions, will offer a unique rival female character. If the status related to the course is high enough, the rival may offer her friendship. Once the friendship is forged, the rival character will bring present on the character's birthday that would boost up some of her status depending on what kind of gift it is. They also would occasionally visit the player's daughter and hang out, which reduces her stress level and boosts certain personality status. School course is rather unusual as she may get a scholarship offer depending on her academic status.

=== Work and progression ===
In addition to courses, the daughter can take part-time jobs from an early age to earn money. The range of available jobs is initially limited, but expands as her abilities increase, with some jobs only unlocking when specific conditions are met. Job performance influences earnings and character development.

Part-time jobs also expand beyond the early-game options, with opportunities at farms, markets, mines, daycares, carpentry, and bars. Success in these jobs depends on the daughter's relevant abilities, stamina, and temperament, and each job provides variable monetary rewards while influencing her growth.

Studying generally consumes money but provides a reliable way to improve abilities efficiently, while part-time work offers pay but requires consideration of her stamina, skills, and success rates. Some courses and jobs also introduce rivals, mentorship, or specialized instructors. The game emphasizes balancing work and study with stress management, and frequent interactions through talking or observing her reactions allow players to adjust her schedule according to her mood and social development.

== Development ==
Faery Tales Come True was originally revealed in 1994 for a summer 1995 release on PlayStation. Development of the game began in earnest in October 1994, when the production staff was formally assembled. Although the title was announced around the launch period of the PlayStation, development extended for more than two years. According to Takami Akai, the game was originally planned as a comparatively small-scale project intended to take approximately ten months to complete and to occupy a position among early PlayStation releases.

Development was prolonged by changes in the production structure and the decision to produce a Princess Maker title for the PlayStation before the game's concept was fully defined, leading to later course corrections and delays.

Speaking in 2021, Akai explained that the game required a prolonged development period largely because he left Gainax during production, and because the team struggled with adapting the franchise to Sony's console ecosystem, which at the time was seen as mass-market rather than otaku-focused.

Akai wrote the game's scenario himself, which accounted for most of the development workload, while artwork duties were partially delegated to staff, with Akai still drawing most character illustrations and staff handling backgrounds and costume variations. Akai had his illustrations directly digitized and reproduced at what was described as near-original artwork quality at the time, a process emphasized by the staff as a major artistic goal during development.

According to a 1996 developer commentary, the numeral 3 was deliberately omitted to express the staff's belief that the game was the "true Princess Maker". Akai also stated that the spelling "faery" used in the game's English title was intended to emphasize the concept of an actual fairy, whereas "fairy" is more commonly associated with fairy tales as a genre.

According to a 1997 article in Virtual Idol magazine, Akai explained that while the characters in previous games were intentionally neutral to allow for greater player imagination, Faery Tales Come True aimed for more distinct and lively traits, such as slightly slanted eyes, to make the characters feel more dynamic.

Faery Tales Come True was publicly unveiled at Tokyo Game Show 1996. The game features narration by Maria Kawamura as the Fairy Queen, with the daughter character voiced by Yukana Nogami.

== Releases ==
The game was released for the PlayStation, Windows, Dreamcast (as a collection with Princess Maker 2) and Sega Saturn.

The technology magazine Wired reported in November 1997 that Faery Tales Come True sold well on the PlayStation in Japan, but a North American release stalled because publishers saw consoles as a family market and were uneasy with the game's premise.

Faery Tales Come True was officially released in English on Steam in 2017. The English release has been criticized for poor translation quality, including grammatical errors, awkward text formatting, unclear terminology, and font legibility issues.

In 2019, the HD remake of the game was released on Nintendo Switch and PC.

== Reception ==
Reception

Review score
Publication	Score
Famitsu	8/10, 6/10, 6/10, 6/10 (PS)

Faery Tales Come True was released on January 24, 1997, and achieved strong initial commercial performance, ranking first in weekly sales during its release week. However, the following week saw the release of Final Fantasy VII, which quickly overwhelmed the market and came to dominate both sales charts and media coverage. Developers involved later reflected that the timing of the release made it difficult for the game to maintain long-term visibility.

In an April 1997 review, Game Criticism wrote that while Faery Tales Come True was polished and well balanced, longtime fans might see it as a conservative entry that failed to provide the same sense of novelty as earlier games. The magazine characterized it as incremental sequel despite its high overall quality.

In a June 1998 review of the Sega Saturn version, Faery Tales Come True was received favorably by Saturn Fan, which praised the game's daughter-raising systems, accessibility for newcomers, and the emotional satisfaction derived from long-term character growth and plentiful events. Reviewers also criticized the absence of certain training elements present in earlier entries and questioned the value of the Saturn release due to its delayed timing.

== Music releases ==
An official soundtrack arrangement album specific to Faery Tales Come True was released under the title Princess Maker: Yumemiru Yōsei on 4 September 1996. The album features arranged music from the game and includes a mini drama segment performed by voice actress Yukana Nogami.
