= Princess Maker (video game) =

1991 video game

- PC-98 cover art
- Developer: Gainax
- Publisher: Gainax
- Director: Takami Akai
- Designer: Toshio Okada
- Artist: Takami Akai
- Composer: Masahiro Kajiwara
- Series: Princess Maker
- Platforms: PC-9801; IBM PC; MSX2; X68000; PC Engine CD-ROM²; PlayStation 2; Windows
- Release: JP: May 24, 1991
- Genre: Raising simulation
- Mode: Single-player

Princess Maker (Note: Japanese: プリンセスメーカー, Hepburn: Purinsesu Mēkā) is a child-raising simulation video game created by Gainax and the first entry in the Princess Maker series, first released in Japan in 1991.

Set in a medieval fantasy world, the game centers on the long-term upbringing of a young girl entrusted to the player. The gameplay centers on managing her education and moral development from childhood to adulthood.

Gameplay unfolds over a span of eight in-game years, during which the player manages the daughter's work, rest, and leisure activities. These choices determine events, character development, and the eventual outcome of her life.

At the time of release, Princess Maker drew attention for its unusual focus on parenting. The game is widely regarded as a foundational work in the child-raising simulation genre.

== Plot ==
In the past, a peaceful kingdom was invaded by demonic forces led by the Demon King. One hero was able to defeat the army, forcing the Demon King into exile. The king offers the hero a reward, but he refuses, choosing to live quietly, taking in a human girl orphaned by the war.

== Gameplay ==
The daughter at age 10 with her stats and event artwork

The player raises the daughter, with her future determined by how her time is managed during this period. The daughter possesses numerous parameters (abilities and personality traits) which directly influence her eventual outcome. The girl's future is determined by a dense network of parameters managed over the course of play. These include physical and mental attributes such as stamina, strength, intelligence, refinement, grit, fatigue, sex appeal, and morality, all of which interact to influence events, behavior, and endings.

Schedulable commands are divided into four primary categories: education, part-time work, rest, and vacation. Education and part-time work are further subdivided into more specific options. Education generally requires payment, while part-time work provides wages. Although the daughter does not require money for food, she must earn funds herself to pay for education and to purchase items. Excessive work or education increases fatigue, and if fatigue becomes too high the daughter may fall ill. A decline in morality can cause her to engage in delinquent behavior.

Additional systems govern combat-related abilities, experience and leveling, health indicators such as height and weight, and overall scoring derived from accumulated stats. Players directly control only a few fixed elements, while nearly all other outcomes depend on how these parameters are shaped through education, work, training, and rest. Education, work, and other activities must be carefully balanced.

The daughter character features a wide range of facial expressions, clothing, and seasonal artwork, which change dynamically based on age, time of year, and circumstances. These visual variations were considered one of the game's most striking features at the time of release.

The game features a total of 30 possible endings, and the player's accumulated decisions are evaluated at the end of the game. Ending determination is based primarily on the daughter's highest parameter and an overall evaluation score. An evaluation score of 1200 or higher results in a queen ending without exception, while a score between 800 and 1200 results in a princess ending. Beyond these outcomes, the remaining endings are determined by dominant attributes. High sex appeal results in endings such as concubine or prostitute, while high physical strength results in occupations such as general or lumberjack.

== Development ==
The concept for Princess Maker was developed at Gainax under the proposal of Toshio Okada and the direction and visual design of Takami Akai.

In a 2012 interview, Okada explained that Princess Maker originated from a combination of Akai's interest in the training mechanics of Nobunaga's Ambition and Okada's desire to create a game that simulates a woman's life from childhood to adulthood.

Initially, the project was titled My Fair Child, but it eventually became Princess Maker to reflect the goal of raising a girl to become a princess. To make the premise approachable for a male audience, the team decided the player would assume the role of a father figure who adopts a girl, rather than directly playing as the girl herself.

According to a 2018 interview with DenfamiNicoGamer, Okada proposed creating a game that would make the player cry. Akai responded by framing the project as a character-raising simulation, which would emphasize emotional attachment and long-term growth instead of more conventional gameplay elements.

A key design goal was allowing the daughter's personality and future to branch naturally based on player decisions, rather than forcing a single correct outcome.

Influences explicitly referenced during development included simulation games such as SimCity and AquaZone. Adventure, puzzle, and combat elements were considered but ultimately subordinated to the central raising system.

The developers felt that raising a girl inside a computer could feel "dangerous" if presented directly, so they relocated the concept to a fantasy setting. They explicitly compared this framing to The Tale of the Bamboo Cutter, citing Kaguya-hime as a model.

Akai explained that the age range of 10 to 18 years old was selected intentionally. He stated that if the girl were younger, the game would become pure childcare and would not be playable, while starting at around 18 years old would turn the game into a dating simulation rather than a child-raising game.

In a 2004 retrospective interview collected in Yomigaeru PC-9801 Densetsu, Toshio Okada and Takami Akai outlined their commercial strategy leading up to Princess Maker. Okada described a three-step plan in which early titles emphasized erotic appeal to build sales, followed by more conventional adventure games such as Silent Möbius, and finally an original work (Princess Maker) once the studio had the resources to attempt something larger. He argued that the goal was not only titillation but to emotionally move players, stating that surprising players with a heartfelt ending after they expected erotic content was a deliberate tactic.

Okada and Akai further explained that Princess Maker's core design drew inspiration from Dragon Quest, but with most RPG elements stripped away. Akai characterized it as a game about "reducing" mechanics, likening it to tending bonsai. Okada emphasized simulating the sadness and weight of an entire life through small touches such as the daughter's final letter to the player. Together, they framed the finished work as what Okada called a "non-moving RPG", combining simulation systems with literary suggestion.

Princess Maker was priced at ¥14,800 at the time of release, equivalent to $110 in 1991 US dollars. Akai said in 2021 that Princess Maker was deliberately priced at the same premium level as Koei titles because the team believed lowering the price would not substantially increase sales. The large box size and the lavish supplementary booklet were also modeled after Koei's releases.

Before Princess Maker, games featuring anime-style girls were commonly assumed to be sexually explicit, so retailers often treated such packaging as adult material by default. Gainax had to repeatedly explain to distributors and stores that Princess Maker was not an erotic title.

== Development ==
Princess Maker was widely regarded as the most anticipated computer game of spring 1991 in Japan. Its popularity was driven by the novelty of its child-raising simulation concept and the reputation of Gainax for high graphical standards.

The game's artwork was supervised and largely illustrated by Akai, who was already well known for his work on Denno Gakuen. Akai personally reviewed each completed CG image. During development, Akai and his team faced challenges in creating dynamic character art. As the girl grew, her appearance had to change based on player choices, demanding an exponentially greater amount of artwork.

Designer and illustrator Jun Tamatani worked on Princess Maker, contributing costume, weapon, and item designs for the series.

== Release ==
The game was first released for the PC-9801 on 24 May 1991, and later received numerous ports across Japanese computer and console platforms. Although the core gameplay remained consistent, versions differed in visual presentation, system adjustments, and the inclusion of voiced dialogue.

An IBM PC version was released on 13 December 1991, faithfully reproducing the PC-9801 content despite the platform's relatively small user base in Japan.

The MSX2 version followed on 31 May 1992 and was notable for being the first entry in the series to feature voiced dialogue for the daughter character, performed by Chisa Yokoyama. It is one of the later commercial releases for the MSX2, contributing to its rarity. Recording was constrained by the MSX2's technical limits, with dialogue delivered in short clips lasting only a few seconds. At the time, game voice acting was often discouraged within the voice acting industry, and Yokoyama was advised to avoid such roles to preserve her public image; nevertheless, she chose to accept the part.

A version for the X68000 was announced for release in January 1997 as a mail-order exclusive. The release was reportedly limited to 500 copies, and employed an unusual copy-protection method in which purchaser information was embedded in the game data, making resale or unauthorized copying impractical.

The series was later adapted for console hardware. Princess Maker was released for the PC Engine CD-ROM² on 13 January 1995, featuring voiced dialogue, an official guidebook, and a bundled drama CD.

Princess Maker was not selected for English localization in the 1990s due to platform constraints. According to Tim Trzepacz of SoftEgg, one contributing factor was that the game was not available in a DOS/V format, which was required by Western publishers for localization at the time. Although an IBM PC release existed for limited systems such as the Teradrive, it was not considered suitable for English translation.

A revised edition titled Princess Maker Refine was announced by Gainax in November 2002. The Refine Version changed in-game graphics from the original 16-color palette to 32,000-color visuals, and all voice audio was newly recorded. The daughter character was voiced by Kyoko Tsuruno, replacing the earlier recordings. A PlayStation 2 version of Princess Maker was released in Japan in 2004 by GeneX as a budget-priced title.

A mobile phone version of Princess Maker, titled Princess Maker i, was released in the early 2000s through TinMachine, Inc. for Japanese feature phones. TinMachine also offered related mobile-exclusive titles, including a poker game featuring characters from the Princess Maker series.

== Music ==
Music from Princess Maker received an official arranged soundtrack release produced by members of the game's original music staff, including Masahiro Kajiwara.

The album, titled Princess Maker, was released on 21 June 1992, and features full arrangements of all 14 tracks from the game in picture CD format.

== Reception ==
=== Original ===
In a reader poll conducted by Technopolis magazine, the game won first place in the 1991 General Software Division, winning by a wide margin. The magazine noted that the game attracted a broad demographic, ranging from younger players to adult office workers.

Princess Maker likewise dominated Comptiq's 1991 reader poll, earning first place with what editors described as an overwhelming margin of votes. The magazine credited the game's appeal to the novelty of its child-raising premise.

In September 1992, micomBASIC reported that Princess Maker remained popular in Japan following the release of a Kanji-ROM–free MSX2 edition. The magazine described the title's success as genuine, praising its innovative child-raising concept and multiple endings, crediting Gainax's presentation for turning isolated events into a cohesive narrative of a girl's growth.

A December 1992 article in MSX FAN magazine highlighted the game's growing Japanese fan community through a reader-participation column titled Princess Maker Club, featuring a contest for the "strongest daughter", fan illustrations and promotional giveaways.

In February 1995, Famitsu magazine's Reader Cross Review gave the PC Engine version of the game an 8 out of 10.

In 2021, Akai recalled that he personally went to Akihabara on the day of the game's release, fearing that copies might still be sitting unsold on store shelves, only to find that it had completely sold out by midday.

=== Remaster ===
In December 2002, Comptiq celebrated the upcoming release of Princess Maker Refine, a remastered version of the original, framing it as a welcome return to the series' origins. The magazine praised the full-color overhaul of the original 16-color graphics and Akai's continued involvement as director and character designer, arguing that the remake successfully refreshed the title for modern PCs while appealing to both longtime fans and newcomers.

4Gamer.net's coverage of Princess Maker Refine in 2005 characterized the remaster as a faithful revival of the original, praising its full-color graphics and added voice acting by Kyoko Tsuruno. The article noted the austere visuals and demanding balance, but argued that this difficulty encouraged repeated play.

== Legacy ==
Manga artist Tamiki Wakaki, author of 16bit Sensation, explicitly names Princess Maker alongside Dōkyūsei as one of the two works to which "all games up to now ultimately come down," describing it as a prior masterpiece that helped establish the form refined by later bishojo games.

In 2025, the source code for the original NEC PC-9801 versions of Princess Maker 1 and 2 was publicly released with the cooperation of the rights holders. The 8086 assembly code was made public in a partial form, with character dialogue and key ending content withheld.
