= Skull Man =

Japanese manga series by Shotaro Ishinomori

- Cover of the first tankōbon volume

スカルマン (Sukaru Man)
- Genre: Superhero
- Manga
- Written by: Shotaro Ishinomori
- Published by: Kodansha
- English publisher: NA: Ishimori Productions
- Magazine: Weekly Shōnen Magazine
- Published: January 1970
- Volumes: 1
- Manga
- Written by: Kazuhiko Shimamoto
- Published by: Media Factory
- English publisher: NA: Tokyopop
- Magazine: Comic Alpha; Monthly Comic Flapper
- Original run: April 7, 1998 – May 2001
- Volumes: 7
- Live-action television film
- Directed by: Makoto Yokoyama
- Studio: Ishimori Productions
- Original network: Fuji TV
- Released: April 21, 2007
- Runtime: 30 minutes
- Anime television series
- Directed by: Takeshi Mori
- Produced by: Kōji Yamamoto; Yūki Mori; Masahiro Yoshida; Makoto Watanabe; Jinichirō Koyama
- Written by: Yutaka Izubuchi
- Music by: Shirō Sagisu
- Studio: Ishimori Productions; Bones
- Licensed by: NA: Sentai Filmworks
- Original network: Fuji TV
- English network: US: Anime Network
- Original run: April 28, 2007 – July 22, 2007
- Episodes: 13
- Manga
- Written by: Meimu
- Published by: Kodansha
- Magazine: Magazine Z
- Original run: May 2, 2007 – October 24, 2007
- Volumes: 2

Skull Man (Japanese: スカルマン, Hepburn: Sukaru Man) is a Japanese manga series written and illustrated by Shotaro Ishinomori. It first appeared in Weekly Shōnen Magazine in 1970. The hero of the story, whose parents have been murdered, grows up to use his peculiar powers to take revenge. The original Skull Man was one of the first antiheroes to be seen in manga, someone who would sacrifice the lives of innocents in his quest for vengeance.

While developing the Kamen Rider (Masked Rider) TV series along with producer Toru Hirayama, Ishinomori created this manga as his own personal version, which the producers at Toei Company Ltd. used as the basis for the show. They made several changes to the content, as Ishinomori's original 100-page one-shot story was too dark and gruesome (even cerebral) for a show for all ages at the time.

In the late 1990s, after he had fallen ill, Ishinomori contacted manga artist Kazuhiko Shimamoto to do a remake of his original one-shot manga. This remake boasted an extensive, continuing storyline and more complex artwork (along with a tribute to Ishinomori in the final issue, with several of his famous characters gathered together). This was the manga that was presented in the US by Tokyopop. The original 1970 version was digitally released in English by Ishimori Productions in 2012. An animated TV series adaptation, produced by Ishimori Productions and animated by Bones, was broadcast on Fuji TV from April 28, 2007, to July 22, 2007.

== Plot ==
=== 1970 manga (one-shot) ===
There are mass murders and catastrophes all over Japan, committed by a masked/caped psychic madman called the Skull Man, and his shapeshifting aide Garo (named after the manga ninja Garo created by Sanpei Shirato), who can mutate into various powerful monsters. The calamities caused by the Skull Man are investigated by the Tachiki Detective Agency, with the help of a young man named Tatsuo Kagura, the son of a yakuza in the Kagura Clan.

Police Chief Tachiki, who heads the Tachiki Detective Agency, suspects that Tatsuo is the Skull Man. Tatsuo, in turn, suspects that the detective is a part of a public conspiracy that has been after him for fifteen years. It turns out that Tatsuo's parents were murdered and he was adopted by the Kagura Clan. For fifteen years, Tatsuo has been hunting for the mastermind, who manipulates all industry, finance and even politics. Tatsuo, the Skull Man, threateningly demands Tachiki that he tell him the name of the mastermind. After muttering the culprit's family name, Chisato, the Skull Man shoots him in the head.

Skull Man and Garo then race to the estate of a reclusive old man named Kogetsu Chisato, who lives with a girl named Maya, who is mute and blind (she is always seen with her eyes closed). Overcome with psychotic rage, Skull Man threatens to kill Chisato, who not only kindly welcomes him, but has been looking forward to his arrival. Maya, however, telepathically persuades him not to kill Chisato, and reveals a shocking secret: Chisato is Skull Man's grandfather and Maya is his younger sister.

Chisato tells his shocked grandson the whole story: his own son, Tatsuo's father, was a scientific genius beyond geniuses. In fact, he was so intelligent and unearthly that he was a mutant, a being of Newmanity (Shinjinrui - similar to that in Ishinomori's later creation, Inazuman). His wife, whom he married and had Tatsuo with, was a mutant as well. The couple conducted bizarre experiments that were capable of destroying humanity. Chisato feared this greatly, so, when Maya was born, he killed his own son and daughter-in-law, and sought to kill his grandson Tatsuo, who ended up being rescued and raised by Garo. He could not bring himself to kill Maya, however, and raised her to be his faithful servant. Maya then tells Skull Man that Chisato wanted to bring him back before he could do anything.

Chisato traps himself, Skull Man, Garo and Maya in glass walls, and sets himself and all the others ablaze, sadly stating that "We were born in the wrong era!" Along with his entire "family", Tatsuo dies a tragic, horrible death in the inferno.

== Characters ==
Skull Man (スカルマン, Sukaru Man)
Voiced by: Hiroshi Tsuchida
A mysterious man in a skull-shaped mask making appearances in Ōtomo City and rumored to have been killing numerous victims in the city, especially those roaming at night. He is believed to be the missing Tatsuo Kagura at first, but later in the series, Father Yoshio Kanzaki, a close friend of Hayato's, reveals himself as the true Skull Man and explains that the only people he has been killing are those who are members of a new cult who mutate into monsters. After Yoshio's death, Hayato becomes Skull Man himself and saves Maya from the ritual, for Yoshio's sake. The Skull Man is actually not a person, but an ancient helmet that grants the user supernatural abilities and deadly weapons. At one point, Kiriko's brother Jin dresses up in a fake Skull Man suit and uses it to commit murders, but the real Skull Man shows up later and confronts him.
Hayato Mikogami (御子神 隼人, Mikogami Hayato)
Voiced by: Makoto Yasumura
Hayato Mikogami once lived in the orphanage in Ōtomo City. After being adopted and raised, he left Ōtomo to move to Tokyo so he can work for a famous newspaper. Years later at 23 years old, he is working for a second rate newspaper and with permission leaves to go back to Ōtomo City to search for the legendary figure, Skull Man who by rumors had recently killed an actress. While on the train trip, he meets a young Kiriko who doesn't have the correct passport to get into the city and he helps her in by presenting a business card of Gōzō. Later, after getting comfortable into his old house, he gets locked outside due to Kiriko's tantrum. Without realizing, he breaks the midnight curfew and witnesses a man who is running away from someone. The man injures Hayato after he tries to help him but the man is killed by the Skull Man. Hayato collapses on scene, pinning him to the murder but is let off due to his ties with Gōzō.
Hayato is a care-free guy who smokes and is constantly annoyed by Kiriko. Later he develops a close friendship with her. At the end of the series, Hayato takes up the mantle of the Skull Man against the original's warning, mortally wounding himself when he overuses the mask's powers. For reasons unexplained, the white mask turns black in the rising sunlight before a mysterious group, later revealed to be Black Ghost, picks him up and converts him into a cyborg.

== Media ==
=== 1970 manga ===
Although the original Skull Man is not yet in printed in the U.S., Comixology obtained the license rights to the title and has released an English-language digital version of the manga in 2012.

=== 1998 manga ===
The 1998 manga is a remake of the original manga. While based on Ishinomori's original manga story, the 1990s version was put together by manga artist Kazuhiko Shimamoto, who had been a fan of Ishinomori's work since childhood. Ishinomori contacted Shimamoto towards the end of the former's life, requesting him to work with him on reviving the story of Skull Man. In accomplishing this, Ishinomori faxed Shimamoto the story premise and plot notes, while Shimamoto put it all together and did the artwork. A few years earlier, Shimamoto worked on a manga adaptation of the movie Kamen Rider ZO, which included a short story about a struggling manga artist who completely idolized a fictional version of Ishinomori. This manga features a myriad of cameos of other famous Ishinomori heroes, although this is mainly contained in the final pages of the manga's last chapter.

=== Anime ===
An anime TV series adaptation was broadcast on Fuji TV stations for three months from April 28, 2007, to July 21, 2007, for a total of 13 episodes. Produced by Geneon Entertainment, Fuji TV, ToyoKasei, Ishimori Entertainment, and animated by Bones, the series was directed by Takeshi Mori, with Yutaka Izubuchi handling series scripts and designing Skull Man and GRO, Jun Shibata designing the characters, Yoshinori Sayama designing the mechanical elements and Shirō Sagisu composing the music. A live-action "Episode Zero" was shown on April 21, titled Skull Man: Prologue of Darkness, starring Ami Suzuki, Kamen Rider Hibiki and Death Note's Shigeki Hosokawa, and Makoto Itō. It was also set up to be a pseudo prequel to Cyborg 009.

Logo for the 2007 anime series

Unlike the Skull Man manga, the story focuses on a journalist named Hayato Mikogami who returns to his hometown of Otomo to investigate strange rumors of killings done by a man wearing a skull mask. Tailed tightly by a young photographer, Kiriko Mamiya, the two soon uncover the many strings of connections between the victims, a local pharmaceutical company, a mysterious new religious sect and strange half-human, half-animal creatures, which roam the night streets for blood. Many of the characters are taken from Ishinomori's works other than Skull Man.

The series opening theme is TOKIO's "Hikari no Machi" (ひかりのまち; "City of Light") and the ending theme is Chocolove from AKB48's "Ashita wa Ashita no Kimi ga Umareru" (明日は明日の君が生まれる; 'A New You Is Born Tomorrow').

==== Episodes ====
No.	Title	Directed by	Written by	Original release date
0	"Skull Man: Prologue Of Darkness"; Transliteration: "Sukaru Man ~Yami no joshō~" (Japanese: スカルマン〜闇の序章〜)	Yūsuke Fujikawa	Masaaki Sakai	April 21, 2007
Live-action prequel episode.
1	"City of the Dancing Mask"; Transliteration: "Kamen ga odoru machi" (Japanese: 仮面が踊る街)	Katsumi Terahigashi	Yutaka Izubuchi	April 28, 2007
Journalist Hayato Mikogami arrives in his hometown and begins investigating the enigmatic Skull Man. However, he runs into his target sooner than expected.
2	"The Man From the Past"; Transliteration: "Kako kara kita otoko" (Japanese: 過去からきた男)	Yasushi Muroya	Seishi Minakami	May 5, 2007
Hayato, temporarily a murder suspect, is released from police custody due to his connections. His further investigations reveal a possible connection between the Skull Man and an arson case ten years ago.
3	"Crimson Rain Falls in the Afternoon"; Transliteration: "Shinku no ame wa gogo ni furu" (Japanese: 深紅の雨は午後に降る)	Hirokazu Yamada	Hiroshi Ōnogi	May 12, 2007
Yui receives a threatening letter and later becomes the target of blackmail. Kiriko follows Yui and Sayoko to the theater. However, the real target of the Skull Man is Sayoko, who turns out to be a mutant.
4	"The Ghost That Goes For a Stroll"; Transliteration: "Sanpo suru yūrei" (Japanese: 散歩する幽霊)	Shigeru Ueda	Hiroshi Ōnogi	May 19, 2007
A dead body hung from a railroad bridge makes Hayato investigate the legend of the Phantom Monorail. However, once on board, he becomes the target of the Skull Man.
5	"The False Blind Spot"; Transliteration: "Itsuwari no shikaku" (Japanese: 偽りの死角)	Yasushi Muroya	Seishi Minakami	May 26, 2007
Usami, the Skull Man impostor, tries to eliminate the original. Meanwhile, Kiriko discovers a person from her past among the Byakureikai members.
6	"Banquet of the Grim Reaper"; Transliteration: "Shinigami-tachi no utage" (Japanese: 死神たちの宴)	Katsumi Terahigashi	Yutaka Izubuchi	June 2, 2007
Hayato and Kiriko run across yet another Skull Man killing the town mayor. With other trails getting cold, the two decide to investigate the Byakureikai from the inside.
7	"Master of the Beasts"; Transliteration: "Jinjū tsukai-shi" (Japanese: 人獣使い師)	Yasuhiro Minami	Seishi Minakami	June 9, 2007
Hayato and Kiriko are discovered and kicked out of Byakureikai, but Hayato discovers that one of the disciples there is an old acquaintance of Kiriko and the reason for her entering the town. That person - Jin - is masquerading as the Skull Man in order to carry out assassinations for Gōzō Kuroshio.
8	"The Maiden Whispers in the Moonlight"; Transliteration: "Gekkō ni otome wa sasayaku" (Japanese: 月光に乙女はささやく)	Junichi Yokoyama	Hiroshi Ōnogi	June 16, 2007
Kiriko and Hayato, fresh off a lead left by Jin, work together to investigate photographs left by him of the White Bell compound. His legacy draws them deeper into the events surrounding the White Bell cult. Meanwhile, coming out of cathartis, Kiriko runs into Maya again after the previous episodes' developments, Hayato warms up to an old flame by the name of Nami that returns to the village after him, and learns about his old school crush's unfortunate history after he left Otomo.
9	"Blessed Are the Impure"; Transliteration: "Kegareshi mono ni shukufuku o" (Japanese: 穢れしものに祝福を)	Hirokazu Yamada	Yutaka Izubuchi	June 23, 2007
The police step up patrols in the city in response to the escalating violence and wind up with more victims as a result, due to a monster lurking about. At the same time Nami is having recurring nightmares, driving her to the brink of desperation, while her unknowing admirer Detective Shinjou gets high hopes after being promised a date with her. In the mix of encircling circumstances, Hayato tries to support Nami and is rejected, just as events unfold which change everything for the three of them.
10	"The Circus Laughs at Midnight"; Transliteration: "Sākasu wa mayonaka ni warau" (Japanese: サーカスは真夜中に嗤う)	Satoshi Nakagawa	Shingo Takeba	June 30, 2007
Hayato and Kiriko hide out in the woods, since Hayato is now a wanted criminal. The Company has brought in a group of elite mercenaries - all cyborgs actually - via the Phantom Monorail, to flush out the Skull Man. In the battle between them and the Skull Man and his "Lost Numbers" (two mutants he rescued and who follow him), many of the cyborgs are killed, but the Skull Man is mortally wounded. Hayato follows the blood trails back to the church, and it is finally that his identity is really Father Kanzaki.
11	"Darkness Take My Hand"; Transliteration: "Yami yo, wa ga te o tori tamae" (Japanese: 闇よ、我が手を取りたまえ)	Keisuke Ōnishi	Hiroshi Ōnogi	July 7, 2007
After the battle between the Skull Man and the cyborgs in the forest subsides, Hayato, Kiriko, and Detective Shinjou descend on Yoshio Kanzaki's church to finally learn the truth about the Skull Man, but they are not alone.
12	"Bloody Eve"; Transliteration: "Chi no seiya" (Japanese: 血の聖夜)	Katsumi Terahigashi	Seishi Minakami	July 14, 2007
Taking up the dying wishes of his close friend, Hayato returns to the city to stop Masaki Kuroshio's evil machinations from unfolding. In the meantime, all hell breaks loose in the city as the fighting mutants and the army are also attacked by the Corporation's mechanical war machines and cyborgs.
13	"Black Fable: All That I Love Leaves Me"; Transliteration: "Kuroi gūwa ~ itoshiki mono wa subete sari yuku" (Japanese: 黒い寓話～愛しきものは全て去りゆく)	Yasushi Muroya	Yutaka Izubuchi	July 21, 2007
Having succeeded in achieving his objective Masaki Kuroshio announces the birth of a new humanity, and the new Skull Man is the only one who can stop him. But this will cost him everything he has yet to give.

==== Broadcasting ====
Several television stations and satellite channels in Japan have broadcast the anime series. These include: Tokai TV, Kansai TV, BS Fuji and Animax.

In the Philippines, Hero TV started its Tagalog-dubbed broadcast on November 11, 2012.

==== DVD release ====
On July 25, 2007, the full series has been available monthly on Region 2 DVD, with individual episodes released by Geneon Entertainment in Japanese-language audio with no subtitles. All DVDs have 7 volumes, and each volume contains two episodes (including only one episode for Volume 1). In addition, the live-action special "Skull Man: Prologue of Darkness" DVD was released on September 21, 2007.

In Spain, it has been distributed on DVD by Selecta Visión from January 24, 2009. The audio soundtracks include Japanese and Spanish (Castilian) with Spanish (Castilian) subtitles which automatically appear. On March 24, 2010, Selecta Visión has re-released the series as the Integralized Version DVD with the same audio tracks but with newly enhanced features such as the same content from the Japan DVD release, but in 5.1 quality instead of stereo. All DVDs have 3 Volumes in one disc each (Volumes 1 & 2 have 4 episodes and Volume 3 has 3 episodes) which are individually available or coming with a collector's box set.

In Canada and the United States, it was licensed by Sentai Filmworks and distributed by Section23 Films, who released the complete collection on Region 1 DVD on February 2, 2010. For legal reasons, the original opening, "Hikari no Machi", has been replaced with an instrumental opening and footage from an earlier trailer for the series.

=== 2007 manga ===
The 2007 manga is based on the anime series adaptation of the same year and drawn by the manga artist Meimu. Set in an alternate history of Japan, freelance journalist Hayato Mikogami returns to his hometown of Otomo to investigate rumors of a man wearing a skull mask committing murders there. Once in the city, he discovers connections between the victims and a local pharmaceutical company, a new religious sect, and strange half-human, half-animal creatures. Along with a young photographer, he decides to find out who the Skull Man really is.

=== Audio CD soundtrack ===
- On July 25, 2007, Geneon Entertainment released their first original score anime soundtrack album entitled "The Skull Man Original Soundtrack from the TV Anime" and on January 25, 2008, the second original soundtrack was also released entitled "The Skull Man Original Soundtrack 2". All albums and music are composed by Shirō Sagisu.

== China ban ==
On June 12, 2015, the Chinese Ministry of Culture listed Skull Man among 38 anime and manga titles banned in China. The reason for this is likely due to the way that skulls and other skeletal material were considered taboo in that country.

== See also ==
- Kamen Rider Skull of Kamen Rider W, whose design is meant to homage Skull Man.
- Flying Phantom Ship, an anime film in which the characters Gozo Kuroshio and Gisuke Haniwa made their debut.
- Black Ghost of Cyborg 009, whose design is reportedly based on Skull Man.
