= Monika Bustamante =

American actress

Monika Bustamante is an American voice actor who has performed in various anime productions, including Happy Lesson (OAV) as Kisaragi Ninomai, and Petite Princess Yucie (TV) as Cocoloo.

== See also ==
- Dubbing
- Voice-over
