= Honō no Tenkōsei =

Japanese manga series and its adaptations

- First tankōbon volume cover, featuring Noboru Takizawa

炎の転校生
- Genre: Comedy, parody, sports
- Manga
- Written by: Kazuhiko Shimamoto
- Published by: Shogakukan
- Imprint: Shōnen Sunday Comics
- Magazine: Weekly Shōnen Sunday
- Original run: July 20, 1983 – November 13, 1985
- Volumes: 12
- Original video animation
- Directed by: Katsuhiko Nishijima
- Produced by: Shouji Murahama
- Written by: Toshio Okada
- Music by: Kohei Tanaka
- Studio: Gainax
- Released: May 21, 1991
- Runtime: 25 minutes
- Episodes: 2
- Television drama

Blazing Transfer Students
- Directed by: Toshio Lee
- Written by: Yuko Kawabe
- Music by: Toshihiko Sahashi
- Original network: Netflix
- Original run: November 10, 2017
- Episodes: 8
- icon

Honō no Tenkōsei (炎の転校生; 'Blazing Transfer Student') is a Japanese manga series written and illustrated by Kazuhiko Shimamoto. It was serialized in the Shogakukan manga magazine Weekly Shōnen Sunday from 1983 to 1985. Honō no Tenkōsei was adapted into a two-episode original video animation (OVA) anime series in 1991 by Gainax. A live-action series, titled Blazing Transfer Students, premiered on Netflix in 2017.

== Plot ==
Noboru Takizawa transfers to a school where all disputes are settled through fighting. He quickly runs afoul of the school bully, Saburō Ibuki, who has a boxing match with "God's Hall Monitor", Kōichi Jōnouchi, to determine who will date the lovely Yukari. Takizawa is enraptured with Yukari, and decides to intervene in the fight which Ibuki won by bending the rules. Takizawa loses the fight in the first OVA to Ibuki's deadly finishing punch, but in the second OVA Takizawa develops his own finishing punch and eventually wins the day.

== Characters ==
Noboru Takizawa (滝沢 昇, Takizawa Noboru)
Voiced by: Toshihiko Seki
Yukari Takamura (高村 友花里, Takamura Yukari)
Voiced by: Noriko Hidaka
Saburō Ibuki (伊吹 三郎, Ibuki Saburō)
Voiced by: Tesshō Genda
Kōichi Jōnouchi (城之内 考一, Jōnouchi Kōichi)
Voiced by: Shō Hayami
Chiaki Takano (高野 千明, Takano Chiaki)
Voiced by: Toshiyuki Morikawa (credited as Schoolboy A)
Jun Namekata (行方 純, Namekata Jun)
Voiced by: Shin-ichiro Miki (credited as Schoolboy C)

== Media ==
=== Manga ===
Honō no Tenkōsei, written and illustrated by Kazuhiko Shimamoto, was serialized in the Shogakukan magazine Weekly Shōnen Sunday from July 20, 1983, to November 13, 1985. The individual chapters were collected in twelve tankōbon volumes, released from February 18, 1984, to January 18, 1986.

=== OVA ===
Honō no Tenkōsei was adapted into a two-episode original video animation (OVA) anime produced by Gainax. The anime reunites director Katsuhiko Nishijima and character designer Yuji Moriyama of the original Project A-ko and features storyboards by Sumio Watanabe. The OVA features an opening vocal theme written by Shimamoto Kazuhiko, arranged by Kohei Tanaka, and performed by Toshihiko Seki. The ending theme, Yumemiru Ki Mo Chi Dreaming Heart (夢みるキ・モ・チ 〜Dreaming Heart〜), was composed and arranged by Tanaka and performed by Noriko Hidaka. The Honō no Tenkōsei OVA parodies anime of the 1970s, particularly Tomorrow's Joe, and is complete with intentionally jerky animation, dirty-looking cels, thick black lines, and retro character designs, much like Shimamoto's drawing style.

According to Chris Beveridge of The Fandom Post, Honō no Tenkōsei was released on both VHS and laserdisc, but not DVD. It was released on Blu-ray by Pony Canyon on March 19, 2014.

=== Live-action series ===
A Netflix original live-action series called Blazing Transfer Students or Honō no Tenkōsei Reborn was released as a sequel set years after the original story. The story revolves around seven students all named Kakeru who transfer into the school. It was released on November 10, 2017, and was directed by Toshio Lee.

== Reception ==
As of March 2017, the manga had over 1.6 million copies in circulation.

Anime News Network's Justin Sevakis, commenting on the anime, said that "while the animation has that slightly soft shot-on-film look, the heightened contrast and angular designs that were meant to evoke the past have instead kept it looking modern."
