= Princess Maker 5 =

2007 video game

- Developer: Gainax
- Publishers: JP: CyberFront Corporation; TW: TTIME Technology; WW: CFK Co., Ltd.
- Designer: Takami Akai
- Series: Princess Maker
- Platforms: Microsoft Windows, PlayStation 2, PlayStation Portable
- Release: 2007
- Genres: Social simulation game, Raising simulation
- Mode: Single-player

Princess Maker 5 is the fifth game from the main Princess Maker series originally released for Microsoft Windows in 2007. A PlayStation 2 version of the game followed in 2008 which included various Gainax references, such as the use of Neon Genesis Evangelion and Gurren Lagann costumes. A PlayStation Portable version was also released in 2008.

== Gameplay ==
The game is set in modern times and takes place over the course of eight in-game years. Players take on the role of a parent – mother or father, in contrast to previous games in the series – raising a girl of royal descent, and a potential princess candidate. Players must protect the girl after other candidates are killed and she could be the next target. Players manage the girl's education, activities, and personal growth.
