= Aoi Honō =

Japanese manga series by Kazuhiko Shimamoto

- First tankōbon volume cover, featuring Moyuru Honō

アオイホノオ
- Genre: Coming-of-age
- Manga
- Written by: Kazuhiko Shimamoto
- Published by: Shogakukan
- Imprint: Shōnen Sunday Comics Special (Note: Only the first volume was published under the Young Sunday Comics imprint.)
- Magazine: Weekly Young Sunday; (March 8, 2007 – July 31, 2008); YS Special; (October 2008); Monthly Shōnen Sunday; (May 12, 2009 – present)
- Original run: March 8, 2007 – present
- Volumes: 33
- Television drama

Blue Fire
- Directed by: Yuichi Fukuda
- Produced by: Junpei Nakagawa
- Written by: Yuichi Fukuda
- Music by: Eishi Segawa
- Studio: TV Tokyo
- Original network: TV Tokyo
- Original run: July 19, 2014 – September 27, 2014
- Episodes: 11
- icon

Aoi Honō (Japanese: アオイホノオ; lit. 'Blue Blazes') is a Japanese manga series written and illustrated by Kazuhiko Shimamoto. It was serialized in Shogakukan's seinen manga magazine Weekly Young Sunday from March 2007 to July 2008, when the magazine ceased its publication; a chapter was published in YS Special in October 2008, before being transferred to Shogakukan's then-brand-new shōnen manga magazine Monthly Shōnen Sunday in May 2009. Aoi Honō is a fictionalized account of Shimamoto's time as a student at the Osaka University of Arts, which he attended alongside Hideaki Anno, Hiroyuki Yamaga, and Takami Akai.

It was adapted into a television drama series, titled Blue Fire in English, that aired from July to October 2014. The drama was streamed on Viki with English subtitles. The real Takami Akai and Hiroyuki Yamaga make cameos in the television series: Akai plays a bathhouse manager in episode 10, while Yamaga plays the bartender at a restaurant where his counterpart passes out (which, according to Yamaga, is based on an actual incident) in episode 7.

== Cast ==
- Yūya Yagira – Moyuru Honō
- Ken Yasuda – Hideaki Anno
- Tsuyoshi Muro – Hiroyuki Yamaga
- Tomoya Nakamura – Takami Akai
- Mizuki Yamamoto – Tonko Morinaga
- Yuina Kuroshima – Hiromi Tsuda
- Kaname Endō – Masahiko Minami
- Gaku Hamada – Toshio Okada
- Kenji Urai – Kentarō Yano
- Yui Ichikawa – Jun Iwase
- Haruna Kojima – Masumi
- Seika Taketomi – Miyuki
- Jirō Satō – MAD Holy
- Anna Kon'no – Rumiko Takahashi
- Toshio Okada – Osamu Tezuka

=== Voice ===
- Tōru Furuya – Narrator and Katsuya Niimi (Nine)
- Hiromi Tsuru – Yuri Nakao (Nine)
- Makio Inoue – Captain Harlock (manga) (Space Pirate Captain Harlock)
- Masako Nozawa – Tetsuro (Galaxy Express 999)
- Masako Ikeda – Maetel (Galaxy Express 999)
- Teruhiko Aoi – Joe Yabuki (Ashita no Joe)
- Hiroko Ushida – Yōko Shiraki (Ashita no Joe)
- Kōichi Yamadera – Captain Juzo Okita, Susumu Kodai and Ryu Hijikata (Space Battleship Yamato)
- Katsumi Toriumi – Masato Wakamatsu (Miyuki)
- Ryōtarō Okiayu – Jun Kenzaki (Ring ni Kakero)
- Kappei Yamaguchi – Nobotta Ōyama (Otoko Oidon)

== Media ==
=== Manga ===
Aoi Honō is written and illustrated by Kazuhiko Shimamoto. The manga debuted in Shogakukan's seinen manga magazine Weekly Young Sunday on March 8, 2007. After the magazine ceased publication on July 31, 2008, a chapter of Aoi Honō was published the Big Comic Spirits special supplementary issue YS Special in October 2008. The series was then transferred to the brand new shōnen manga magazine Monthly Shōnen Sunday on May 12, 2009. Shogakukan has collected its chapters into individual tankōbon volumes. The first volume was released on February 5, 2008. As of August 10, 2026, 33 volumes have been released.

==== Volumes ====
No.	Japanese release date	Japanese ISBN
1	February 5, 2008	978-4-09-151268-0
2	May 11, 2009	978-4-09-121650-2
3	December 12, 2009	978-4-09-122109-4
4	June 11, 2010	978-4-09-122389-0
5	November 12, 2010	978-4-09-122578-8
6	June 10, 2011	978-4-09-122828-4
7	November 11, 2011	978-4-09-123278-6
8	May 11, 2012	978-4-09-123249-6
9	November 12, 2012	978-4-09-123880-1
10	June 12, 2013	978-4-09-124257-0
11	December 12, 2013	978-4-09-124440-6
12	July 11, 2014	978-4-09-125126-8
13	January 9, 2015	978-4-09-125517-4
14	July 10, 2015	978-4-09-126254-7
15	May 12, 2016	978-4-09-127249-2
16	October 12, 2016	978-4-09-127435-9
17	May 12, 2017; May 10, 2017 (SE)	978-4-09-127623-0; 978-4-09-941891-5 (SE)
18	November 10, 2017; November 8, 2017 (SE)	978-4-09-128014-5; 978-4-09-943001-6 (SE)
19	May 11, 2018; May 9, 2018 (SE)	978-4-09-128288-0; 978-4-09-943015-3 (SE)
20	December 12, 2018	978-4-09-128725-0
21	July 12, 2019	978-4-09-129346-6
22	December 12, 2019	978-4-09-129524-8
23	June 12, 2020	978-4-09-850138-0
24	December 11, 2020	978-4-09-850345-2
25	August 11, 2021	978-4-09-850680-4
26	March 11, 2022	978-4-09-851015-3
27	August 10, 2022	978-4-09-851269-0
28	May 12, 2023	978-4-09-852052-7
29	November 10, 2023	978-4-09-853028-1
30	July 11, 2024	978-4-09-853510-1
31	January 10, 2025	978-4-09-853819-5
32	September 18, 2025	978-4-09-854260-4
33	August 10, 2026	978-4-09-854765-4

== Reception ==
Volume 2 sold 24,521 copies by May 17, 2009, volume 9 sold 20,415 copies by November 18, 2012, and volume 10 sold 17,068 copies by June 16, 2013.

Aoi Honō was one of the Jury Recommended Works in the Story Manga division at the 13th Japan Media Arts Festival Awards in 2009. In 2010, the manga received 23 points in the 3rd Manga Taishō, placing last among the ten nominees. The manga received Excellence Award of the Manga Division at the 18th Japan Media Arts Festival Awards in 2014. In 2015, along with Asahinagu, it won the 60th Shogakukan Manga Award in the General category. In February 2015, Asahi Shimbun announced that Aoi Honō was one of nine nominees for the nineteenth annual Tezuka Osamu Cultural Prize.
