= Princess Maker =

Video game franchise

- PC-98 cover art
- Genre: Raising simulation
- Developers: Gainax; GeneX; CFK
- Publishers: Gainax; CyberFront; CFK
- Platforms: PC-98, MSX2, MS-DOS, FM Towns Marty, PC Engine, Saturn, 3DO, Mac, PlayStation, X68000, Dreamcast, PlayStation 2, Windows, PlayStation Portable, Nintendo Switch, Mobile phones
- First release: Princess Maker; May 24, 1991

Princess Maker (プリンセスメーカー, Purinsesu Mēkā), commonly abbreviated in Japanese fan usage as PuriMe (プリメ), is a series of raising simulation bishōjo games in which the player assumes the role of a parental figure raising a young girl. The series was produced by the video game and anime production company Gainax.

Gameplay across the series centers on scheduling the daughter's activities over a fixed span of in-game years, from childhood to adulthood. Players allocate time and money to activities, which in turn shape her abilities. At the conclusion of the game, these accumulated choices determine one of many possible endings, ranging from royalty to ordinary professions or more troubled futures.

Following the release of the original Princess Maker in 1991, the franchise expanded widely across many different platforms and formats. Later entries were produced by studios other than Gainax under license, while original series creator Takami Akai continued to participate in a supervisory capacity on several projects.

The series has been translated and released in Korea (Fujitsu) and Taiwan (Kingformation). An official English release of the series did not materialize until 2016, with the release of Princess Maker 2 Refine.

Princess Maker has been cited for its cultural influence in East Asia and beyond. The series achieved notable commercial success in Japan during the 1990s, selling 200,000 copies by 1996, and over 1 million by 2005.

== Main series ==
Release timeline Mainline entries in bold
1991	**Princess Maker**
1992
1993	**Princess Maker 2**
1994
1995	Princess Maker: Legend of Another World
1996
1997	**Princess Maker: Faery Tales Come True**
1998	Princess Maker: Pocket Daisakusen
1999	Princess Maker Go!Go! Princess
1999	Princess Maker Q
2000–2002
2003	Princess Maker Refine
2004	Princess Maker 2 Refine
2005	**Princess Maker 4**
2006
2007	**Princess Maker 5**
2008–2011
2012	Princess Maker Social
2013
2014	Princess Maker for Kakao
2015–2018
2019	Princess Maker: Faery Tales Come True (HD Remake)
2020–2023
2024	Princess Maker 2 Regeneration
2025
2026	**Princess Maker: Children of Revelation**

=== Princess Maker ===
Princess Maker is a child-raising simulation game set in a medieval fantasy world. The player takes the role of a hero who has saved the kingdom and is entrusted with raising an orphaned girl. The girl dreams of becoming a princess, and the player is responsible for guiding her upbringing from ages 10 to 18. Through the player's decisions, her future branches into many possible paths, reflecting the game's central theme that her destiny depends on how she is raised.

=== Princess Maker 2 ===
The second game in the series, Princess Maker 2, was released in 1993.

=== Princess Maker 3: Faery Tales Come True ===
Princess Maker: Faery Tales Come True shifts the series' premise by having the player raise a young faery who desires to become a human princess, rather than a divinely gifted human child. The game removes the RPG-style adventuring segments present in earlier entries and focuses entirely on life simulation.

=== Princess Maker 4 ===
Unlike past installments, Princess Maker 4 was developed by GeneX, although Takami Akai (original series creator) remained on hand as a supervisor. This time, character illustrations were handled by Tenhiro Naoto, the creator of Sister Princess. It was released in 2005 on the PlayStation 2.

Structurally, Princess Maker 4 draws much inspiration from Princess Maker 2, although an adventure mode does not exist anymore. As with PM3, full voiceovers have been recorded, including contributions from famous voice actors like Sakurai Takahiro (Prince Sharul/Charles). PM4 is highly drama-oriented. Throughout the game, there are various event scenes that offer clues about the player's daughter's past, not to mention the war between humans and non-humans and her demonic roots. This is probably what differentiates it the most from previous PM games. Another change is that most of the vice-related jobs are less "adult-oriented" as it is impossible for the daughter to receive less reputable jobs such as Cabaret Dancing or as an assassin.

The story begins when the player, a soldier, falls in love with a mysterious woman. However, she disappears, only to be found by him a few years later. She hands him the child, whose default name is Patricia, along with Cube the butler, and so his quest to fatherhood begins.

A Japanese PC version of Princess Maker 4 was released on July 28, 2006. It contains many more endings and events compared to the original. A PlayStation Portable version of Princess Maker 4 was released in Japan on October 12, 2006. A Nintendo DS version of it was released with a few more endings and "extras" not released in the PC version. These extras are, like ending galleries, only accessible after finishing the first ending and credit sequence.

=== Princess Maker 5 ===
Princess Maker 5 released for Windows in 2007. Akai participated only in planning and character supervision. The PlayStation 2 version appeared in 2008.

=== Princess Maker: Children of Revelation ===
Princess Maker: Children of Revelation was released into early access on Steam on July 3, 2025. Developed by D-ZARD under a licensing agreement with Yonago Gainax, it is the first mainline Princess Maker game to be released since Princess Maker 5 in 2007. D-ZARD expects to fully release the game in the first half of 2026.

The player's daughter is Karen Daidoji, who previously appeared as the protagonist of Princess Maker Q.

The project originated from fan activity within the Korean studio and reflects the continued popularity of the series in South Korea, where Princess Maker 2 achieved broad recognition beyond niche audiences.

Development was disrupted after D-ZARD underwent major restructuring in mid-2025, resulting in the departure of most of the production staff. In January 2026, D-ZARD announced that development had resumed through a new partnership with South Korean studio GEAR2.

== Related games ==
- Princess Maker: Legend of Another World: a Super Famicom title released on 15 December 1995. This entry featured an original science fiction setting and protagonist, while retaining a growth system largely based on Princess Maker 2, with combat redesigned as an action-based system. The game shares many similarities with Princess Maker 2 and was released for the Super NES by Takara. Unlike the other games, the daughter does not have a default name, but is named Melody Blue in Go! Go! Princess.
- Princess Maker Pocket Daisakusen, a puzzle game using Princess Maker characters.
- Princess Maker Go! Go! Princess, a board game using Princess Maker characters.
- Princess Maker Q, a quiz adventure game using Princess Maker characters.
- Princess Maker Social, an online version of Princess Maker developed by MGAME Korea.
- Princess Maker for KAKAO, a mobile app version of Princess Maker featuring previous characters and clothes. Originally released in South Korea and Japan on May 2, 2014 and September 18, 2015 respectively, the game has ended service since April 30, 2022.

== Unreleased titles ==
=== Unreleased in-house Princess Maker 4 ===
2003 screenshots from the unreleased Princess Maker 4

In Summer 2002, Akai discussed a version of Princess Maker 4 that was then planned for release in winter 2002 for Windows. Unlike the later outsourced title that ultimately bore the same name, this project was being produced internally.

The game was intended to depart sharply from the traditional schedule-driven structure of earlier entries. Rather than tightly directing the heroine's life month by month, this Princess Maker 4 was conceived as a more observational experience, in which events would flow on their own and the player would intervene only lightly. The setting was also shifted from a fantasy kingdom to the contemporary world, with a girl arriving from a magical realm to live in the player's environment.

Akai also commented on the heroine's visual design for this planned Princess Maker 4, explaining that she was experimenting with a straighter hairstyle inspired by Kaguya-hime imagery and long side locks.

This project was eventually abandoned due to Akai's health issues. However, the concept went on to be the basis of Princess Maker 5, including the modern Japan setting and the fact that Cube can transform himself into a dog.

=== Other projects ===
At the Tokyo Game Show in September 1999, Princess Maker was showcased as an upcoming online version, tentatively titled Princess Maker Online. According to PC Watch, no gameplay was demonstrated, and details were sparse.

== Merchandise and related media ==
=== Music releases ===
Several official soundtrack arrangement albums were released for titles in the Princess Maker series. The arrangements were handled by members of the original game music staff, including Masahiro Kajiwara.

The first album, Princess Maker, was released on 21 June 1992, and features full arrangements of all 14 tracks from the game in picture CD format. Princess Maker 2 followed on 21 February 1995, containing arranged versions of 12 background music tracks from the game. A third album, Princess Maker: Yumemiru Yōsei, was released on 4 September 1996, and includes a mini drama featuring voice actress Yukana Nogami.

=== Manga adaptations ===
The Princess Maker series was adapted into manga on several occasions. Kimiko Higuchi, the wife of Takami Akai, played a prominent role in these adaptations.

Published manga works include Princess Maker (released 22 June 1993 by ASCII Comics), another Princess Maker volume released by Wani Books on 10 October 1995, and Princess Maker: Yumemiru Yōsei, published by Futabasha on 28 December 1996. Additionally, Ganbare! Princess-chan, a related manga by Kimiko Higuchi, was released on 25 May 1995.

=== Anime ===
The anime Petite Princess Yucie is loosely based on all the Princess Maker games, has the character of Cube from Princess Maker 2 appearing as Yucie's steward in the anime, looking nearly identical in style and design to how he appears in the game. Yucie herself looks almost identical to the character of Lisa from Princess Maker 3, including the hairstyle and unusually large forehead. The final "villain" of the anime shares the appearance of Maria, the daughter from Princess Maker 1. Ket Shi the demon cat, a minor villain in one episode, is also from Princess Maker 2, although in the game he is the god of the Wildcat tribe, and can be helpful to the player rather than harmful. Other characters in Petite Princess Yucie can undoubtedly also be found in other Princess Maker games.

=== Books and collectibles ===
Several official strategy guides were published for the Princess Maker series, primarily by ASCII and related publishers, including guides for later console releases.

Official character figures for the Princess Maker series were reportedly limited. One notable release was a resin garage kit titled Princess Maker 2 Girl, produced at 1/8 scale and released in August 1995. In 2003, Princess Street released a limited-edition Princess Maker 2 character doll based on the daughter's appearance after age 17. The hand-finished doll was limited to 100 units and included multiple outfits and accessories inspired by in-game scenes.

In 2016, a Princess Maker 25th anniversary merchandise project was launched, with commemorative goods sold at the Comiket 90 corporate booth, including tenugui hand towels, bamboo fans, and clear files featuring illustrations of past daughter characters.

== Reception and legacy ==
Princess Maker is recognized as the progenitor of the "raising simulation" genre, sparking a wave of games focused on nurturing virtual characters. In 1995, Game Conference highlighted how the game's premise of raising a child in a simulation format resonated with societal shifts, especially in the context of Japan's declining birth rate and the growing sense of loneliness in modern households.

In Taiwan, Princess Maker is described as having left a lasting impression on players of the 1990s. In South Korea, Princess Maker is described as an early PC game that also attracted a significant female audience during the 1990s. The series was popular at the time. The series has had a lasting impact in Chinese-speaking regions, where Princess Maker gained popularity and continues to influence titles such as the Nikki series and Volcano Princess.

Speaking in 2021, Akai explained that while new Princess Maker titles in Japan slowed after the early 2000s, overseas interest remained comparatively strong, particularly in Korea, China, and Taiwan, where the series was often regarded as a game primarily played by women. In South Korea, he recounted being told that nearly every woman over thirty had played a Princess Maker game.

DenFamiNicoGamer credited the Princess Maker series, alongside Sotsugyo, with helping spark the 1990s bishojo game boom.

Although the Princess Maker franchise had no official US releases during the 1990s, it nonetheless drew criticism from Western feminist commentators. A February 1997 article in the feminist publication Off Our Backs characterized the game as allowing Japanese men to "fantasize about having control in the home," focusing on elements it viewed as provocative or troubling, such as the option for the daughter character to sunbathe nude and the possibility that poor player performance could lead to endings in which the daughter becomes a bar hostess.

Academic literature on human-computer interaction from the early 2000s grouped Princess Maker with other forms of animated, personified software, treating its daughter character as part of the same category as Microsoft's Office Assistants or the Tamagotchi.

== See also ==
- Angelique
- Cute Knight
- Long Live the Queen
- Volcano Princess
- Neon Genesis Evangelion: Ayanami Raising Project
