= Kazuhiko Shimamoto =

Japanese manga artist

Hidehiko Tezuka (Japanese: 手塚 秀彦, Hepburn: Tezuka Hidehiko; born April 26, 1961, in Ikeda), better known as Kazuhiko Shimamoto (島本 和彦, Shimamoto Kazuhiko), is a Japanese manga artist. He attended college at the Osaka University of Arts in the fine arts department. While in college in February 1982, he debuted in the spring special issue of Weekly Shōnen Sunday with Hissatsu no Tenkōsei. At this point, he dropped out of college and devoted his energy to becoming a manga artist.

Shimamoto is responsible for several long-running and well-known manga series. He drew Honō no Tenkōsei from 1983 to 1985, as well as the Moeyo Pen saga, which began as a one-volume manga published in 1990 but was continued in two more series totaling 24 volumes. He also worked with Shotaro Ishinomori on a Skull Man manga based on Ishinomori's intended storyline, which was licensed in the US by Tokyopop. His baseball manga Gyakkyō Nine was adapted into a live-action Japanese film in 2005.

His past assistants include Katsu Aki, Masaaki Fujihara, Eisaku Kubonouchi, and Tetsuo Sanjō. Some of his college classmates include Gainax founders Hideaki Anno and Hiroyuki Yamaga, among others. They later appeared as characters in his manga Aoi Honō.

== Works ==
- Honō no Tenkōsei (炎の転校生)
- Kaze no Senshi Dan (風の戦士ダン) (written by Tetsu Kariya)
- Gyakkō Nine (逆境ナイン Nine in Adversity, Gyakkō Nain)
- Mubō Captain (無謀キャプテン)
- Otoko no Ichimai Red Card (男の一枚 レッド・カード)
- Gekitō (ゲキトウ)
- Moeru V (燃えるV)
- Insider Ken (インサイダーケン)
- Wonder Bit (ワンダービット)
- Chōsensha (挑戦者)
- Onsen Man (オンセンマン)
- Brazil Kara no Tegami (ブラジルからの手紙)
- Totsugeki Wolf (とつげきウルフ)
- Battle Thunder (バトルサンダー)
- Moeyo Pen (燃えよペン)
- Hoero Pen (吼えろペン)
- Shin Hoero Pen (新・吼えろペン)
- Shinseiden Megashiddo (神聖伝メガシード)
- Kamen Rider ZO (仮面ライダーZO)
- Kamen Rider Black Part X Imitation 7 (仮面ライダーBlack PART X イミテーション7)
- Moeru!! Joshi Pro-Wrestling (燃える!! 女子プロレス)
- The Shimamoto (ザ・島本)
- Dainetsugen (大熱言)
- Despai (デスパイ)
- Mega Mega Miina (メガMEGAみーな)
- Hōno no Ninja Man (炎のニンジャマン)
- Hōno no Nobunaga Sengoku Gaiden (炎の信長・戦国外伝)
- Kamen Boxer (仮面ボクサー)
- Nagareboshi no Jackel (流れ星のジャッカル)
- Hōno no Fudekon (炎の筆魂)
- Hōno no Fudekon Nino Kobushi (炎の筆魂 弐之拳)
- Insider Ken (インサイダーケン)
- Skull Man (スカルマン) (based on the original Shotaro Ishinomori manga)
- Manga Nihon no Keizai (マンガ日本の経済) (collaboration with Shotaro Ishinomori)
- Anime Tenchou (アニメ店長)
- Takyū Shachō (卓球社長)
- Moero!! King of Heart Kidō Butō Den G Gundam (燃える!! キング・オブ・ハート 機動武闘伝Gガンダム)
- Battlefield (Battleフィールド)
- Samurai Spirits (サムライスピリッツ)
- Samurai Spirits 4 Koma Daikoushin (サムライスピリッツ4コマ大行進)
- Aoi Honō (アオイホノオ)

=== Character designs ===
- BS Anime Yobanashi (BSアニメ夜話) (title design)
- Ashita no Joe no Houteishiki (あしたのジョーの方程式) (Go Sasakibara)
- Mobile Fighter G Gundam (機動武闘伝Gガンダム) (character cooperation)
- Sangokushi Taisen (三国志大戦)
- Rival Schools (ジャスティス学園) (Hayato Nekketsu)
- Live A Live (ライブ・ア・ライブ) (Near Future setting design)
- Honō no Takuhaipin (炎の宅配便) (character design and scenario supervision)
