= Takami Akai =

Japanese illustrator

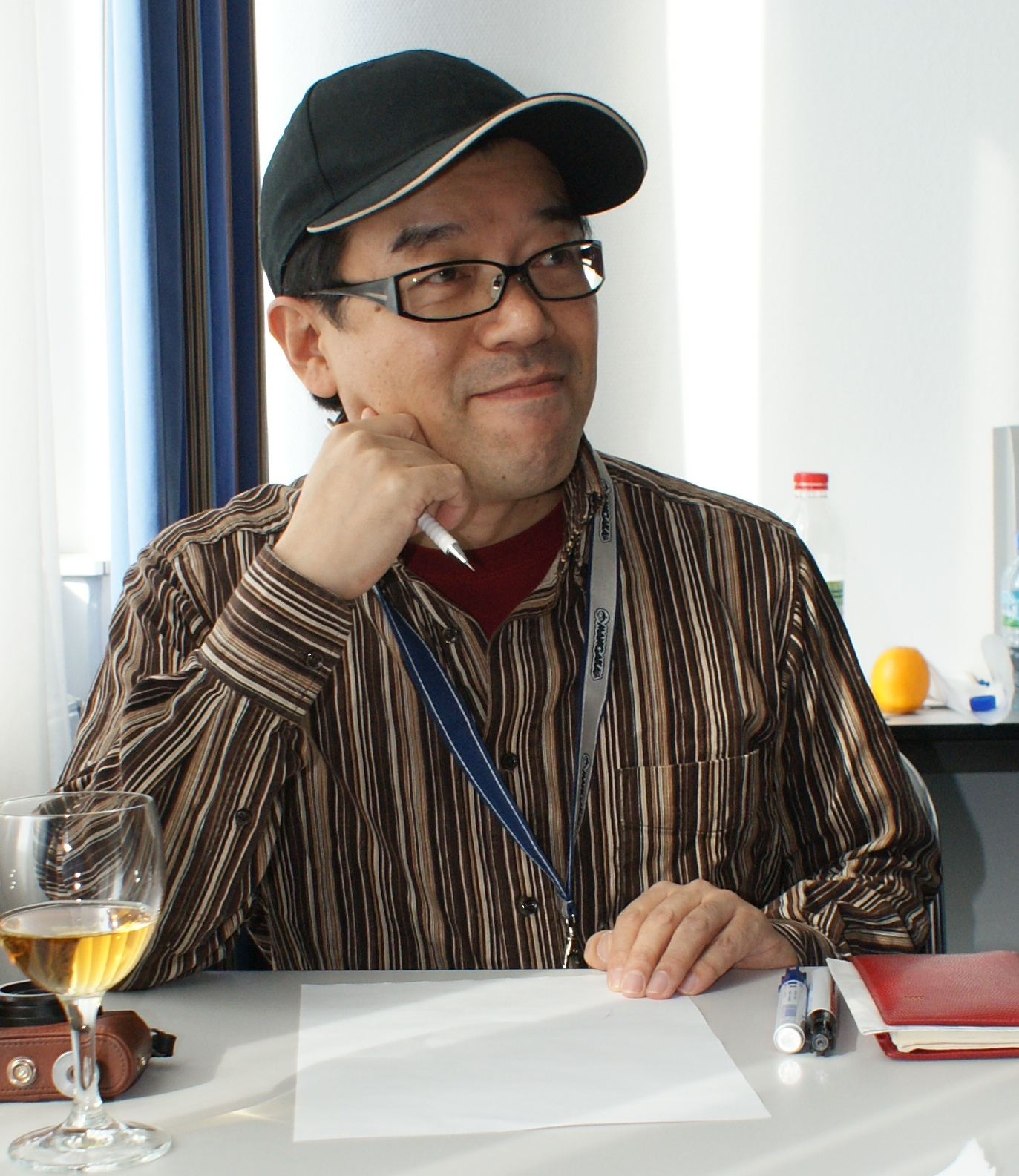
- Takami Akai at the Connichi 2008 in Kassel
- Born: November 21, 1961 (age 64); Yonago, Tottori, Japan
- Occupations: Illustrator, video game creator, character designer and animator

Takami Akai (赤井 孝美, Akai Takami; born November 21, 1961) is an illustrator, game creator, character designer and animator.

== Career history ==
"There are so many shoot-out games. You kill the bad guys and score points. It's been done, and people expect something totally different. This is a long-term game where you make a commitment and create your own world."

— Takami Akai in 1994 on Princess Maker 2 video games.

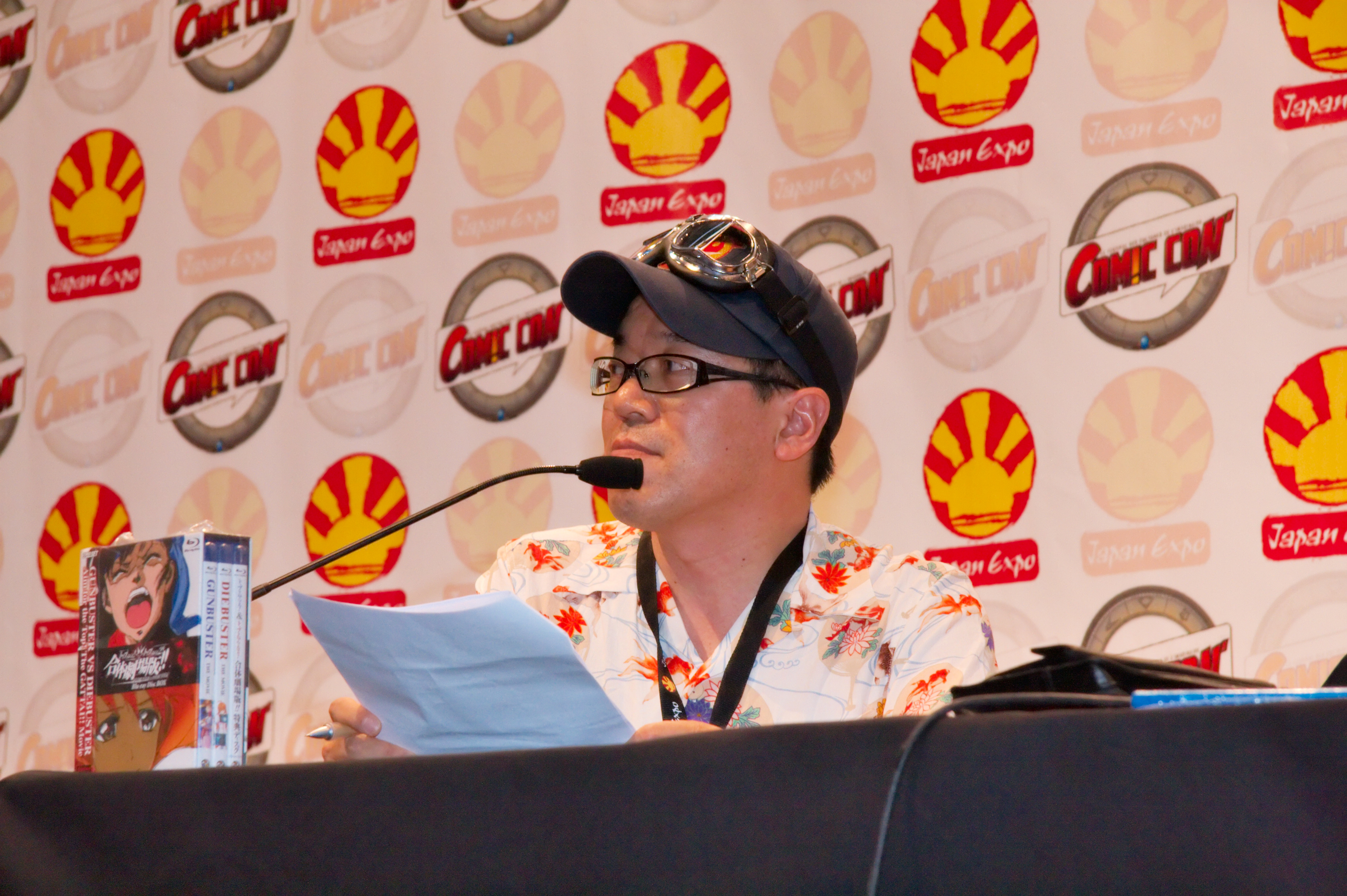
2009

Akai attended Osaka University of Arts majoring in fine art. While studying there, Akai created the character designs for the Daicon III opening animation. The main staff for the Daicon III and Daicon IV opening animations went on to create the animation studio Gainax. Akai was in the same class as Hiroyuki Yamaga and Hideaki Anno.

He was a board member of Gainax. His wife is Kimiko Higuchi. He stepped down from Gainax board after an incident in which he and another employee made disparaging remarks about fan criticisms made on the Japanese Internet forum 2channel. He runs his own company titled NineLives.

He is portrayed by actor Tomoya Nakamura in the 2014 TV Drama Aoi Honō based on the autobiographical manga by his fellow Osaka University of Arts alumnus Kazuhiko Shimamoto. Akai himself cameos in the series as a bathhouse manager in Episode 10.

== Works ==
- Aikoku Sentai Dai-Nippon
- Akai Takami Works
- Banner of the Stars (anime, character designs)
- Crest of the Stars (anime, character designs)
- Dennō Gakuen
- Magical Pop'n (package artwork)
- Kaettekita Ultraman (Daicon Film)
- Petite Princess Yucie (anime, original story, character design)
- Princess Maker (game, character design, director)
- Royal Space Force: The Wings of Honneamise
- Tengen Toppa Gurren Lagann
- Yamata no Orochi no Gyakushū

== See also ==
- Ath (alphabet)
- Baronh
- Gainax
