= Princess Maker 2 =

1993 video game

- PC-98 box art for Princess Maker 2
- Developer: Gainax
- Publishers: Gainax; Microcabin (3DO, Saturn)
- Designers: Takami Akai; Masato Kato
- Composer: Masahiro Kajihara
- Series: Princess Maker
- Platforms: PC-98, FM Towns, PC Engine, Saturn, 3DO, MS-DOS, Windows, Mac, GP32, PlayStation 2
- Release: June 15, 1993: PC-98; JP: June 15, 1993 MS-DOS; JP: December 16, 1993; US: Unreleased FM Towns; JP: September 30, 1994 PC Engine; JP: June 16, 1995 Saturn; JP: October 27, 1995 3DO; JP: December 9, 1995 Windows; JP: October 9, 1996 PS2; JP: September 30, 2004
- Genre: Raising simulation
- Mode: Single player

Princess Maker 2 (プリンセスメーカー2) is a 1993 Japanese video game developed by the company Gainax. It is the second installment in the Princess Maker series of social simulation games. The player must act as a parental figure and raise a young girl to the age of 18, taking care of her life with the player's actions throughout the game.

After the initial release for the Japanese PC-9801 personal computer, it has been subsequently released for many other personal computers and video game consoles. The game has been translated into English, Korean, and Chinese.

== Plot ==
In a fantasy world roughly modeled after medieval Europe, the Demon King's armies suddenly invaded a kingdom, collapsing its walls and burning the city. A nameless warrior challenged the Demon King to a one-on-one duel and, after a fierce battle, defeated him, though he himself was gravely wounded. Grateful, the king and citizens begged him to abandon his travels and remain in the capital, and he finally agreed to settle down.

One night, a shooting star streaks through sky directly before the swordsman. Within the falling light is a small girl wrapped in a glowing sphere. She is a child entrusted to him by the heavens, a "daughter from the stars" described as the gods' final gift to sinful humanity. The daughter, who has spent her childhood in the heavens, is 10 years old and must be raised to adulthood by the player. The success of her growth and future depends entirely on the player's decisions as her father, guiding her through life experiences to help her become the person she is meant to be.

== Gameplay ==
Princess Maker 2 centers on raising a young girl from age 10 to 18 through a structured scheduling system. Each in-game month is divided into three periods (early, middle and late) during which the player assigns activities that influence the character's statistics, personality traits, skills and future outcome. A newly introduced advisory character, the butler Cube, provides guidance and contextual advice, while leaving final choices to the player. Activities are broadly categorized into training, part-time jobs, adventure, and free time.

Training options encompass academic, artistic, religious, military, and magical courses. Part-time jobs gradually unlock as the daughter ages, ranging from domestic work and farm labor to service industry and adult-oriented occupations. The player character also receives a limited annual income. Repeated success at the same job can unlock promotions and higher wages, and completing work streaks without failure can award bonus pay. Rival girls also appear at workplaces and competitions, aging alongside the protagonist and serving as benchmarks for progress. Seasonal festivals held each October include four contest types: martial tournaments, dance parties, art exhibitions, and cooking competitions. Each is tied to specific skills and presented with animated sequences. Random events range from traveling merchants to suspicious encounters in town.

Adventure sections function as a combat mode where the character's battle capabilities are evaluated through encounters. Adventure expeditions take place across four different maps, and defeat in battle does not result in death.

Free-time options vary in effect, offering different forms of recovery and stress reduction. Vacations with the father shift between seaside and mountain trips depending on the time of year, while convalescent stays at spas or enforced bed rest are used to treat illness at financial cost. Proper management of rest is required to prevent illness or poor performance.

Main status screen, with the daughter standing in her room

The main interface centers the daughter's portrait, framing commands and messages to the side and showing the surrounding city through a large window, to reinforce the sense of daily life progressing in a lived-in world. The interface also displays the daughter's age and astrological sign, which determines her guardian spirit and subtly alters her personality growth. Players name the character at the start of the game, and her bedroom can be decorated with drawings she creates over time, which improve in quality as her artistic ability increases. Throughout gameplay, character activities are visually represented with animated event scenes, replacing the mostly static imagery of the original title.

Clothing plays a functional role: outfits must be purchased and are season-dependent, affecting the character's condition and suitability for social gatherings. Character presentation is expanded through a larger variety of facial expressions and the introduction of two body types, which change dynamically based on diet and lifestyle choices. While dieting allows some control over body shape, excessive restriction carries health risks.

The game also introduces town excursions, where the player can shop for items and equipment, dine, visit the hospital when illness occurs, and request audiences at the royal castle. The player can purchase a pill from a merchant that increases the bust size of the girl.

The game ends when the girl reaches 18 and chooses a future career. High score are given to jobs such as Queen or general, whereas low scores are given to jobs such as barmaid. The game features 74 possible endings. Endings include retrospective sequences reviewing the daughter's upbringing and major life events before the final evaluation.

== Development ==
The game was developed by Gainax, who are also known for the anime series Neon Genesis Evangelion and FLCL.

Princess Maker 2 was originally expected to be released in the autumn of 1992. Technopolis magazine attributed the delays primarily to the unexpectedly long time required for physical production work, as well as to the expansion of the game's specifications during development.

Speaking to micomBASIC in 1993, Akai said the sequel was meant to address complaints that the original could feel repetitive. To do so, the team increased the number of character reactions from the daughter and NPCs and added more frequent events to vary the game's flow. The design aimed to encourage repeated playthroughs by giving many different paths to success and happiness.

Gainax initially downplayed the prospect of a console version of Princess Maker 2. In September 1993, the company told Weekly Famitsu that the game had been designed specifically for personal computers, with an older target audience in mind.

Takami Akai described the game's philosophy in a 1994 interview with Wired, stating that unlike typical shooting games where players simply defeat enemies and score points, Princess Maker was intended to be "a long-term game where you make a commitment and create your own world."

A 1993 Newsweek article stated that childrearing in Japan was mostly handled by women at the time, with men focused on careers outside the home. Designer Takami Akai said the game let players do something they couldn't in real life, as fathers would not be allowed to manage their daughters' lives. Akai initially considered giving the player an infant to start the game but decided against it.

== Release ==
Princess Maker 2 was first released for the PC-9801 personal computer. The PC-9801 version is compatible with several MIDI sound modules, including the Roland MT-32. An IBM PC compatible version followed, retaining comparable graphics while adding Sound Blaster audio support and optional hard-drive installation.

The FM Towns version of Princess Maker 2, released in September 1994, introduced voice acting, with the daughter's voice provided by Hiroko Kasahara. This voice work was carried over to the Windows 3.1 version as well.

The game was later released for multiple personal computers including the Macintosh, Windows 95, Windows Me, as well as many home consoles like the 3DO, PC Engine, Sega Saturn, and PlayStation 2.

In 2001, the second and third games in the Princess Maker series were released for the Sega Dreamcast on a compilation titled Princess Maker Collection. In 2002, the game was released for the GP32 handheld system in South Korea. In 2005, it was ported to Japanese mobile phones.

An English language version of the game for MS-DOS was completed but was cancelled in 1996. The version was completed and review copies had been sent out to magazines, however the company producing the English port, IntraCorp, went bankrupt. That version was then subsequently leaked onto the internet, and was sometimes referred to as abandonware.

=== Refine ===
Princess Maker 2 Refine
- Developer: Gainax/GeneX
- Publishers: JP: CyberFront; WW: CyberFront Korea
- Designer: Takami Akai
- Composer: Masahiro Kajihara
- Series: Princess Maker
- Platform: Microsoft Windows
- Release: JP: September 30, 2004; WW: September 28, 2016
- Genre: Life simulation game
- Mode: Single player

Princess Maker 2 Refine is a remastered version of the original game released in 2004. The graphics were redrawn, the sound quality was improved, and various other elements were changed. In South Korea, the game was published by Fujitsu.

Refine was later released on Steam in Fall 2016 by Korean publisher CFK. This version has support for English, Chinese, Japanese, and Korean.

=== Regeneration ===
Princess Maker 2 Regeneration
- Developer: Gainax/Bliss Brain
- Publishers: JP: Bliss Brain; US: Bliss Brain; EU: Bliss Brain; AS: CyberFront Korea
- Designer: Takami Akai
- Composer: Masahiro Kajihara
- Series: Princess Maker
- Platforms: PS4, PS5, Nintendo Switch, Steam
- Release: WW: July 11, 2024; Nintendo Switch, Steam: WW: August 8, 2024; PS4, PS5
- Genre: Life simulation game
- Mode: Single player

Princess Maker 2 Regeneration (Note: Japanese: プリンセスメーカー２ リジェネレーション) is a remaster of Refine released for the Nintendo Switch and Steam on July 11, 2024, and later the PS4 and PS5 on August 8, 2024 with physical copies for the Switch and PS5 released on December 21, 2024 to celebrate the franchise's 30th year anniversary. This remaster features most of the same content as the above since one in game item and two endings were taken out of the PS4 and PS5 while the Switch and Steam versions remain untouched. An opening movie produced by Yonago GAINAX has been added. The animation, which was made by a team led by Takami, allows new players to get a sense of what a future raising their “daughter” is going to be like. Graphics have been redrawn by Takami also in a style that closely resembles the original PC-9801 version. Additionally, the game is upscaled to high resolution for modern games consoles and PCs.

== Music ==
An official soundtrack arrangement album was released for Princess Maker 2, with arrangements handled by members of the original game music staff, including Masahiro Kajiwara.

The album was released on 21 February 1995 and contains arranged versions of 12 background music tracks from the game.

== Reception ==
Reception

Review scores
Publication	Score
Famitsu	7/10, 7/10, 8/10, 7/10 (PC Engine CD-ROM²)
Next Generation	3/5
Ultra Gameplayers	9/10
Hardcore Gamers	4/5
Sega Saturn Magazine	8/10
Famitsu DC	18/30

Princess Maker 2 was a commercial success at the time of its release. By September 1993, the game had sold 30,000 copies, and the company had received 10,000 fan letters. In January 1994, Comptiq ranked it as the most popular computer game of the month, placing it above contemporaries like Dōkyūsei and Romance of the Three Kingdoms III. The game was also cited by the Financial Times as part of a trend of idealized real-world simulation games in Japan.

Several sources praised Princess Maker 2 for the emotional depth of its daughter character. Toshimitsu Itaba, writing in micomBASIC in May 1993, highlighted the game's strength in evoking emotions, particularly in moments like receiving a present from the daughter. Itaba further argued that the game's appeal lay in enjoying the process of raising her rather than simply aiming for elite career endings. A 1997 article in Login similarly emphasized the game's emotional resonance, describing it as a highly influential bishojo child-raising simulation that left a strong impression on players.

The game's mechanics also received varied feedback. A 1993 Technopolis article described Princess Maker 2 as significantly expanded compared to its predecessor, with more activities and events, which helped maintain player engagement. However, the routine of training followed by rest was noted as repetitive, with an extended play report in Login noting that the routine could become monotonous over time.

The game faced some criticism regarding technical performance, particularly on older hardware. Technopolis noted performance issues on Intel 286 machines and long disk access times when playing from floppy disk. On the other hand, the Windows version released later was praised for its improved sound and added voice acting, marking a notable advancement in its technical presentation.

Many reviewers praised the game for its originality. Guillermo Vacas of Minami 2000 praised the game's nonviolent, educational, manga-style presentation, though he noted that its systems could overwhelm first-time players despite finding it compelling overall. Chris Hudak writing in Wired magazine, praised the game for breaking the mold of violent video games on PC at the time. Saying that he had grown attached to his virtual daughter, and that the unique gameplay rewards sensitive paternal players.

Next Generation reviewed the PC version, rating it three out of five stars and calling it one of the strangest PC games released in years, while questioning whether it would ultimately find an audience. Both Next Generation and Ultra Gameplayers praised the publisher for publishing such a unique game. Reviewers also praised the visuals. PC Zone magazine described the anime-style artwork as eye-catching.

Some Western coverage addressed the game's gender themes. Francesca Reyes of Ultra Gameplayers noted what she called sexist allusions but still praised its entertainment value and design, while women's studies professor Etsuko Yamashita criticized the content in an Associated Press interview, comparing some aspects to incest.

In its September 1995 coverage, Jugem highlighted the PC Engine version of Princess Maker 2 for adding full voice acting for all major characters, singling out Aya Hisakawa's performance as the daughter.

Sega Saturn Magazine's November 1995 issue praised the Saturn version of the game for its polish, upgraded visuals, digitized backgrounds, voice acting, and large number of endings. Reviewers noted drawbacks such as slow screen transitions, repetitive voice clips, limited save slots, and the early emphasis on part-time work, but still regarded it as a strong adaptation of the original.

Writing in January 1996, Game Clip praised the Saturn and 3DO versions of Princess Maker 2 as faithful ports that preserved the appeal of the original while enhancing graphics and voice acting to suit the new hardware. The magazine highlighted the expressive character art, smooth controls, and minimal loading times.

In July 2001, three reviewers from Famitsu DC were more critical of the Princess Maker Collection, giving it a low score. They said that the games were simply ports, and that while they were new and innovative at the time, they have since become dated. They said that perhaps Princess Maker: Faery Tales Come True might be an easier to game to play instead.

Reviewing the 2016 English Refine release, Hardcore Gamer gave the game a score of 4 out of 5 and called it "absolutely a blast all these years later", although criticizing the translation, which at times said the opposite of what actually happened or left the endings voiced in Japanese without subtitles.

Janine Hawkins, writing in Vice was critical of the look of the Refine version of the game, including the lack of dithering in artwork.

== Legacy ==
In 2025, the source code for the original NEC PC-9801 versions of the first two Princess Maker games was publicly released with the cooperation of the rights holders. The 8086 assembly code was made public in a partial form, with character dialogue and key ending content withheld.
