= PLA Military Sports Training Center =

Chinese military sports agency

CMC TAD Military Sports Training Center
- 中央军委训练管理部军事体育训练中心

Agency overview
- Formed: 11 January 2016
- Type: Service unit of the Central Military Commission
- Jurisdiction: Central Military Commission
- Agency executive: Sr Col Yuan Xingping, Director
- Parent department: Training Administration Department

The People's Liberation Army Military Sports Training Center, also known as the Central Military Commission Training and Administration Department Military Sports Training Center, is a directly subordinate agency of the Training Administration Department of the Central Military Commission of China. It is responsible for the training of the PLA's military sports teams, and for assisting in the general physical education standards in the PLA. After 2020, it became the last organized sports unit in the PLA. It is the inheritor of a long PLA sports tradition represented by the (now abolished) August First Sports Team.

== History ==
=== August First Sports Team ===
The "August First Sports Team of the PLA", (中国人民解放军八一体育工作大队) also known as the "Bayi Sports Team" (Note: "Bayi" is the pinyin transliteration of the characters 八一, literally "8-1" (that is to say, August 1st), which appear in the PLA flag. The term is used extensively in PLA institutions (like the Bayi Building and the Bayi Aerobatic Team), and it is sometimes translated, sometimes spelled.) (八一体工大队), was established in September 1951 as a division grade unit under the jurisdiction of the Cultural and Sports Bureau of the Propaganda Department of the General Political Department of the PLA (from 24 October 1957 to 1 December 1958, it was led by the Training Inspection Department instead). In December 1969, during the Cultural Revolution, the team was dissolved. It was rebuilt in May 1973, once more under the General Political Department.

The purpose of establishing the team was two-sided. First, it was to be an outreach branch of the PLA, participating in competitive sports as a way to promote physical education, raise the visibility of the PLA, and increase its propaganda reach with the population: "serving the needs of our army's political work, serving the needs of our army's foreign exchanges and exhibitions, serving the needs of the officers and soldiers to carry out sports activities for the masses, and serving the needs of the overall national healthy development". Second, it meant to improve the overall physical and psychological health of the PLA forces: "to guide or, perhaps, coach the troops into carrying out mass sports activities; to enhance the physical fitness of officers and soldiers, to enrich the cultural life of officers and soldiers, to promote the all-round development of officers and soldiers, and to directly generate troop combat effectiveness".

In the beginning, the August 1st Team had no permanent facilities or barracks, and it was successively stationed in the warehouse of the Xiannongtan Stadium, the Dongrongxian hutong residential area, and the Ministry of Public Security's auditorium construction shed. This lasted until marshal He Long placed them in the campus of the People's Liberation Army National Defense University in Hongshankou, Xijiao, Beijing. The first teams established by the August 1st was in men's and women's basketball. Afterwards, it set up men's and women's volleyball teams, football teams, track and field teams, weightlifting teams, cycling teams, swimming teams, gymnastics teams, table tennis teams, and handball teams.

On 7 June 1956, at the "Sino-Soviet Weightlifting Friendly" held in Shanghai, the August 1st weightlifter Chen Jingkai broke the 56 kg class world record with a score of 133 kg. This was the first world record ever broken by a Chinese athlete.

The success kept coming. In September 1959, the First National Games of the People's Republic of China were opened in Beijing. The PLA delegation was composed of August First Team members, and they managed to easily rank first in the gold medal and general medal table with 117 gold, 95 silver, and 64 bronze. In 1963 Second Games of the People's Republic of China, the PLA delegation again won the first place again with 72 gold, 53 silver, and 37 bronze. While this overwhelming dominance waned as civilian national sports developed, in the 11th National Games of 2019, the athletes of the August 1st team still won 19 gold medals.

The 1970s and 1980s was the heyday of the August 1st basketball and women's basketball teams, with the men's basketball team being the first to tour the US, and the women's basketball team winning five consecutive National Games' crowns. The men's basketball team, the "Bayi Rockets" would eventually dominate the early days of the CBA.

In 2011, at the 5th World Military Games in Brazil, the August First team won 9 gold medals, contributing to the PLA delegation's second place in the gold medal table. At the 2008 Summer Olympics, the August First athletes won five gold medals, in women's weightlifting, men's gymnastics team and pommel horse, men's weightlifting, and men's table tennis team, its best performance at the Olympic Games. By 2011, the August 1st team had won 14 Olympic gold medals, 120 world championships, and 980 Asian and other important international championships, 1,452 national championships; 134 times won tournaments, 154 times broke the world record, 133 times broke the Asian record; trained 72 team sport players who went international, 748 nationally certified elite players (健将), and more than 1,700 athletes and coaches for the Chinese national team.

The August 1st Team was located in Hongshankou, Haidian District, Beijing, and in Huangsi, Dongcheng District, it had a track-and-field and swimming training base. At its peak, the August 1st Team had a men's and women's basketball team, men's and women's volleyball teams, football teams, track and field teams, men's and women's weightlifting teams, cycling teams, swimming teams, men's and women's gymnastics teams, men's and women's table tennis teams, men's and women's badminton teams, and handball teams. Retrenchment, however, started at the beginning of the 21st century, as professional sports in China developed and the non-professional military teams lost their advantage. The badminton team and the gymnastics team were dissolved first. Then, in August 2003, the August 1st Football Team。The beach volleyball and swimming teams were merged in a cost-cutting measure. By the 60th anniversary of its establishment in 2011, the August First component teams were the men's and women's basketball team, men's and women's volleyball, track and field, table tennis, weightlifting, gymnastics, and beach volleyball/swimming, for a total of 9 teams in 10 sports.

On 30 December 2017, as part of the 2015 military reforms, the August First Sport Team was transferred to the Military Sports Training Center of the Training and Management Department of the Central Military Commission.

On 11 August 2020, the August 1st men's volleyball team was withdrawn from the volleyball Super League. On 9 September, the August 1st women's football team was withdrawn from the Chinese Women's League One. On 13 October, the August 1st women's volleyball team was withdrawn from the 2020–21 season of the women's volleyball Super League. On 20 October, the Chinese Basketball Association officially announced the withdrawal of the August 1st men's and women's basketball teams from the CBA and the WCBA. On the same day, 20 October 2020, a Military Sports Training Center reform and adjustment conference was held, and the conference announced that the Army would no longer participate in national general sports games or individual events, which meant that all competitive civilian sports teams would be dissolved.

=== August First Military Sports Team ===
In 1958, at the Socialist Nations Friendship Games held in Leipzig, East Germany, China's Han Guishan won the military triathlon, becoming China's first military sports world champion. In 1979, the Chinese People's Liberation Army officially joined the International Military Sports Council. In October of the same year, the head of the Military Training Department of the General Staff, Shi Xia (石侠), announced that the August 1st Military Pentathlon team was established, with Han Guishan as the captain. The main task of the team was to represent China in the World Military Games and the annual World Military Pentathlon Championship.

On 20 December 1982, under the sponsorship of Deng Xiaoping, the "PLA Military Sports Brigade" (军事体育运动大队—also known as the "August 1st Military Sports Team") was formally established. In 1997, the military pentathlon team was awarded the honorary title of "Military Pentathlon Hero Team" by the General Staff. In October 2001, the same award was granted by the CMC. In August 2012, the military pentathlon men's team achieved the feat of winning 17 consecutive crowns at the Pentathlon World Championships, and in the same year, the women's team achieved 12 consecutive championships.

The August 1st Military Team was located in Changxindian, Fengtai, Beijing. In the 2010s, the Team was composed of five event teams: shooting team, military pentathlon team, modern pentathlon team, fencing team, and triathlon team. In 2016, as part of the 2015 People's Republic of China military reforms, the team's superior unit, the Military Training Department of the General Staff was abolished, and the Military Sports Team was transferred to the newly established Training Management Department.

=== PLAN Sports Team ===
In August 1951, the commander of the PLAN, Zhang Aiping, approved the formal establishment of the PLAN Sports Team (海军体育工作队), located in Hongkou District, Shanghai. In December 2017, it was transferred to the Military Sports Training Center.

=== PLA Ice Training Base ===
In October 1973, under the sponsorship of Ye Jianying, the August 1st Speed Skating team was officially established. In April 1981, under the auspices of the Central Military Commission, the General Staff, and the Shenyang Military Region, the speed skating team, that had previously drifted around without base, settled down in Shenyang and built the first open-air artificially refrigerated skating rink of the PLA. In October 1988, the Speed Skating Team was renamed the "Chinese People's Liberation Army Ice Training Base" (中国人民解放军冰上训练基地), and a new speed skating team was set up. In May 1989, a short track speed skating team was added.

In October 1996, with the support of the General Staff and the Shenyang MR, the 44,600m^{2} Ice Training Base was built to the east of Zhaoling Mausoleum in Shenyang, including a standard 400m speed skating rink and an international standard short track speed skating hall. At the end of 2005, an indoor "August 1st Skating Hall" was built over the old outdoor rink. By 2009, the Ice Training Base had hosted more than 30 major competitions, domestic and international.

In 2017, as with the other PLA sports institutions, the Ice Training Base was transferred to the Military Sports Training Center.

=== Military Sports Training Center ===
The 2015 military reforms put a lot of emphasis in re-focusing the PLA energies into war-fighting rather than the complex system of ancillary institutions that had persisted or developed since the last large reforms. This included simplifying the PLA's sports establishment. After the CMC TAD was established, the Military Sports Training Center was set up as a directly subordinate unit. As shown by it being affiliated with the training rather than political department, the new MSTC would focus on specifically military sports training, rather than the general sports and outreach remit of the August First Team. On 30 December 2017, the August First Sports Team was transferred to the MTSC. In the same month, the PLAN Sports Team was also transferred to the center.

== Functions & Organization ==
After the 2017 reforms, the Military Sports Training Center is the only professional sports unit of the whole PLA, based on Fengtai District, Beijing. As opposed to its August 1 ancestors, the MSTC only organizes and trains teams of military sports, and only participates in international military competitions organized by the International Military Sports Council and other friendly international military exchanges. Since its establishment in 2018, the center has won (as of 2024) more than 900 gold medals in various competitions at home and abroad, and won both the gold and the overall medal table at the 2019 7th World Military Games.

=== Current teams ===
The center currently fields seven specialized teams：Military Pentathlon team, Naval Pentathlon team, Aeronautical Pentathlon team, Lifesaving team, Parachuting team, Military Skiing team, and Military Shooting team. Athlete positions are all assigned to senior, middle, and junior NCOs.

The events trained by each team are:

- Military Pentathlon: 200m precision and rapid fire rifle, 500m obstacle course, 50m obstacle swimming, precision and distance inactive grenade throwing, and 8 km cross-country running.
- Naval Pentathlon：305m obstacle race, 75 life-saving swim, seamanship, utility swimming, and 2,500m amphibious cross-country race.
- Aeronautical Pentathlon: 10m air pistol shooting, épée fencing, ball contest, 400 m obstacle course, 100m obstacle swim, and orienteering race.
- Military Swimming & Lifesaving: calm-water standard ILS life-saving events: 200m Obstacle Swim, 50m manikin carry, 100m rescue medley, 100m manikin carry with fins, 100m manikin tow with fins, 200m Super Lifesaver, 4x25m Manikin Relay, 4x50m obstacle relay, 4x50m medley relay, and 12.5m line throw.
- Military Skiing: ski mountaineering, ski orienteering, military ski patrol, cross-country skiing, and biathlon.
- Military Shooting: rifle and pistol events only. Rifles: for men, 300m military rapid fire rifle and 300m three positions (standard speed and rapid fire); for women, 50m three positions. Pistols: for men, 25m military rapid fire and center fire pistol; for women 25m military rapid fire pistol and 25m standard pistol.

=== Physical education health ===
The center also has responsibility for training and guidance on sports matters for the PLA. For instance, in 2018 it published the "Manual for the Prevention of Common Injuries in Military Sports Training", which detail instructions on injury prevention at basic and advance levels for all military phys ed personnel. An online system for sports injury prevention, called the "military sports training service platform" (军事体育训练服务平台), including both education resources and assessment tools, was set up by the Center in 2021.

== Leadership ==
=== August First Sports Team ===
Team leader

- Huang Lie (黄烈) (1952—？)
- Zhou Zhitong (周之同) Sr Col (？—1969)
- Lu Ting (鲁挺) (1973—？)
- He Jie (贺捷) (？—？)
- Huang Lie (黄烈) (1979–1984)
- Li Zhenshi (李振恃) (1985–1989)
- Zhu Yanan (朱亚南) Sr Col (？—？)
- Wu Wanxiang (吴皖湘) Sr Col (？—1999)
- Li Fusheng (李富胜) Sr Col (1999–2003)
- Zhu Jiazhi (朱家志) Sr Col (2003–2008)
- Qian Limin (钱利民) Sr Col (2008–2010)
- Zhu Yuqing (朱玉青) Sr Col (Oct 2010—)

Political Commissars:

- Lu Ting (鲁挺) Sr Col (1959–1969)
- Yu Wenhuai (禹文淮) (？—？)
- Ran Guangzhao (冉光照) (？—？)
- Yang Qihua (杨启华) (？—？)
- Li Haiting (刘海亭) Sr Col (？—？)
- Zhu Yanan (朱亚南) Sr Col (？—1994)

......

- Li Tingguo (李定国) Sr Col (1999–2005)
- Qian Limin (钱利民) Sr Col (2005–2008)
- Cao Wei (曹卫) Sr Col (2008—)

=== August 1st Military Sports Team ===
Team Leader

- Han Guishan (韩桂山)(1982—？)
- Wang Kezhong (王克忠)(Dec 1984—Jun 1990)

......

- Yu Jianzhong (于建中) Sr Col (？—？)

......

- Yang Shaochun (杨少春) Sr Col(？—2010)
- Liu Youhe (刘有和) Sr Col(2010–2013)
- Wu Zhongxin (邬忠新) Sr Col(2013—)

Political commissars:

......

- Jiang Ditai (姜迪泰) Sr Col (？—？)
- Bai Yueyou (白月友) Sr Col (？—？)
- Chen Meilin (陈美林) Sr Col (？—2006)
- Zhang Yuejin (张跃进) Sr Col (2006–2010)
- Zhang Zhenglong (张正龙) Sr Col (2010–2014)
- Xu Xizhong (徐锡忠) Sr Col(2014—)

=== Naval Sport Team ===
Team Leaders:

- (—)

Political Commissars:

- (—)

=== Ice Training Base ===
Commander:

......

- Shen Chunyang (沈春阳) (？—？)

Political commissars:

- (—)

=== Military Sports Training Center ===
Director:

- Yuan Xingping (袁兴萍)(2017—)

Political commissar:

- Cao Baomin (曹保民)(2017—)

== Notable athletes ==
=== August First Team ===
- Basketball: the August 1st men's basketball team won the national championships 38 times, and won the CBA league championship six times in a row between 1996 and 2001, becoming known as the "military dream team". In June 2000 the "Bayi Rockets" was awarded the honorary title of "Unity and Hard Work Elite Team" by the CMC. Famous players include: Zheng Haixia, Mu Tiezhu, Wang Zhizhi, Zhang Zipei, Ma Qingsheng, Wu Xinshui, Kuang Lubin, Guo Yonglin, Wang Fei, A Dijiang, Li Nan, Liu Yudong, Zhang Jinsong, Fan Bin
- Volleyball: The August 1st women's volleyball team won the "Woman's Day National Red Flag Award for Collectives". Famous players include: Chen Zhaodi, Cao Huiying, Yang Xi, Yang Xilan, Li Yanjun, Wang Lina, Zhao Ruirui, Song Nina
- Football: Li Fusheng, Hao Haidong
- Track and field: Fan Xiaoling, Li Hong, Gou Xiaoxin
- Table tennis: Li Zhenshi, Shi Zhihao, Tong Ling, Dai Lili, Shen Jianping, Fan Changmao, Sun Jin, Cao Zhen, Wang Tao, Liu Guoliang, Wang Ha, Fan Zhendong
- Weightlifting: Chen Jingkai (the first athlete in China to break a world record), Lai Runming, Cai Yanshi, Lei Li, Song Zhijuan, Zhong Yan, Ma Runmei, Li Lizhi, Wu Jingbiao, Chen Xiexia, Liao Hui
- Gymnastics: Ma Yanhong (created the first gymnastics move officially named after a Chinese athlete, the "Ma Yanhong dismount"), Xu Zhiqiang, Guolin Yue, Xiao Qin
- Shooting: Xu Haifeng (China's first Olympic gold medalist)
- Badminton: Lin Dan
- Diving: Peng Bo
- Swimming: Lu Donghua, Zhou Yafei, Jiao Liuyang, Ning Zetao
- Beach volleyball: Tian Jia, Wang Fei

=== PLAN Sports Team ===
- Swimming: Qi Hui, Qu Jingyu, Lai Zhongjian, Zhao Tao, Ning Zetao
- Diving: Peng Bo

=== Ice Training Base ===
- Speed skating: Ye Qiaobo, Liu Hongbo, Li Yanzi, Jiao Yunlong, Xing Aihua

==== Military Sports Training Center ====
- Short track speed skating: Xu Hongzhi

== See also ==
- Military sports：International Military Sports Council
- Special Forces Academy（Originally the PLA Physical Education Academy）
- General Administration of Sport
