= Pentathlon =

Combined sporting event of five contests

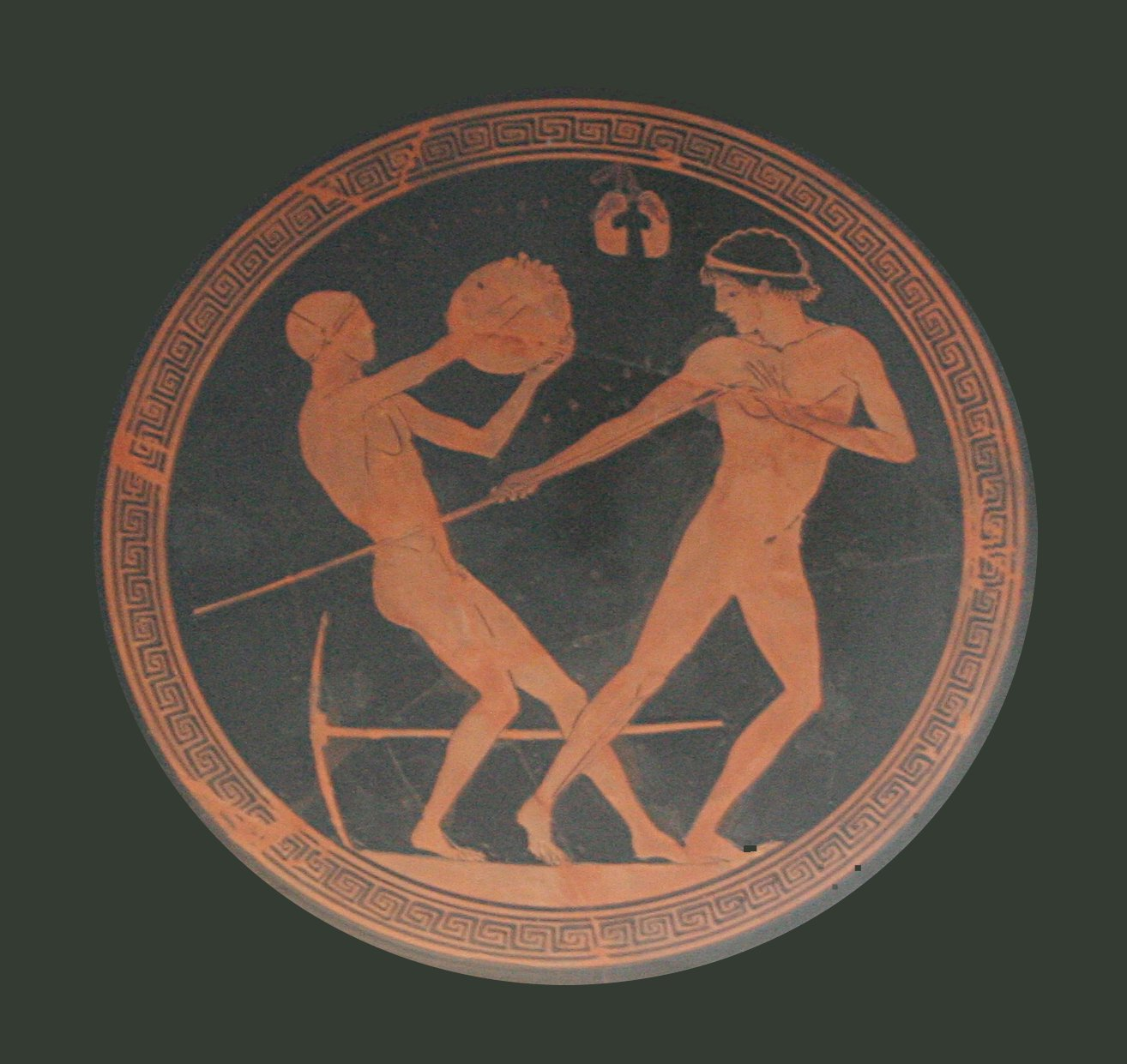
The pentathlon was first documented in Ancient Greece, and included the discus and javelin throw.

A pentathlon is a contest featuring five events. The name is derived from Greek: combining the words pente (five) and -athlon (competition) (Greek: πένταθλον). The first pentathlon was documented in Ancient Greece and was part of the Ancient Olympic Games. Five events were contested over one day for the Ancient Olympic pentathlon, starting with the long jump, javelin throwing, and discus throwing, followed by the stadion (a short foot race) and wrestling. Pentathletes were considered to be among the most skilled athletes, and their training was often part of military service—each of the five events in the pentathlon was thought to be useful in war or battle.

With the revival of the Olympic Games in the modern era, the pentathlon returned in two formats. The athletics pentathlon was a modern variation on the original events, with a competition over five track and field events. The modern pentathlon, invented by Pierre de Coubertin (father of the Modern Olympics), was a variation on the military aspect of the Ancient pentathlon. It focused on the skills required by a late-19th-century soldier, with competitions in shooting, swimming, fencing, equestrianism, and cross country running. A prominent aspect of modern pentathlons is the point system, whereby each competitor is awarded a certain number of points based on their performance in each specific event. The overall winner is the competitor with the highest point total at the end of the five pentathlon events.

== History ==
=== Ancient Olympics ===
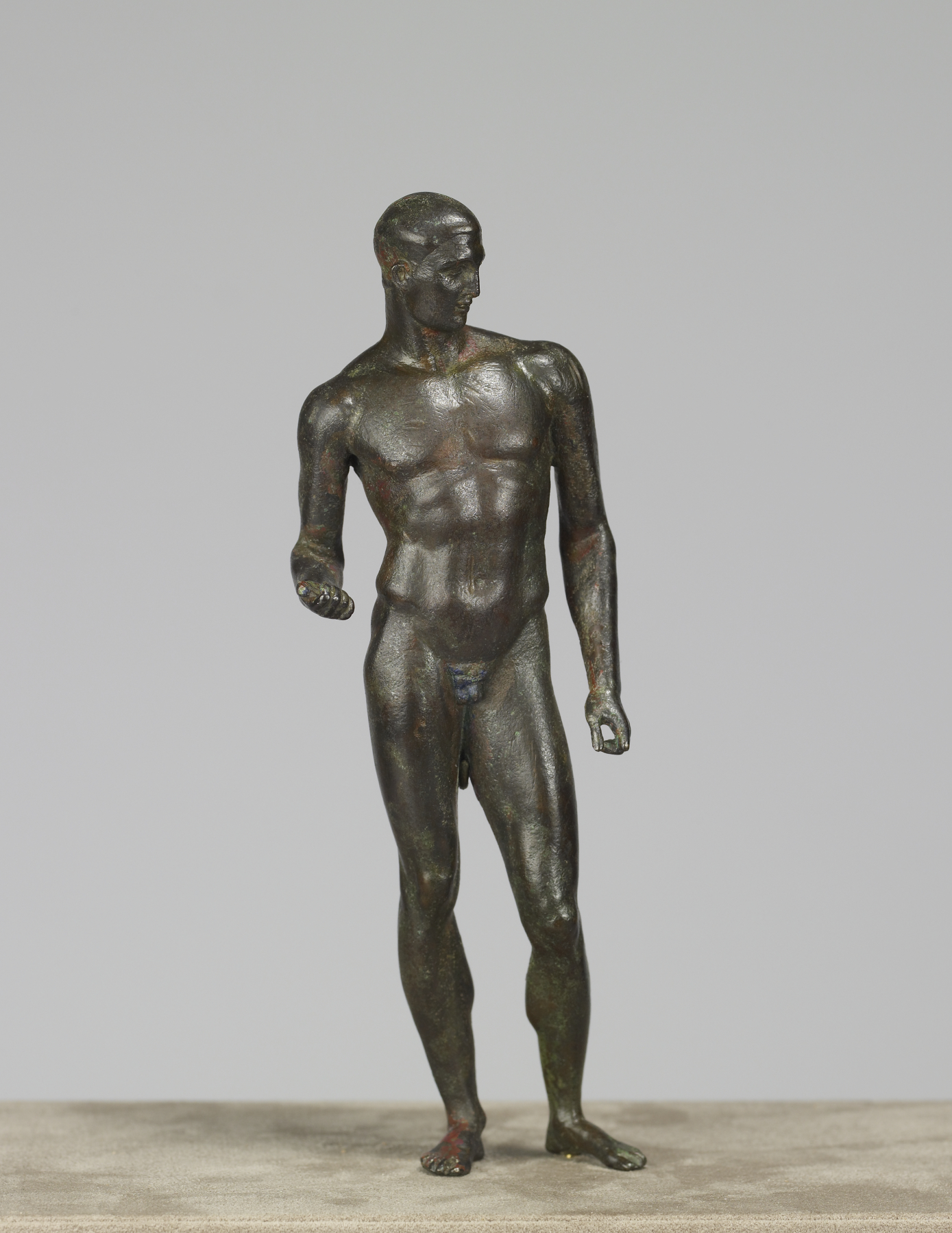
This depiction of an ancient pentathlete dates to the Hellenistic period, c. the 1st century BCE. Walters Art Museum, Baltimore.

The first documented pentathlon occurred in 708 BC in Ancient Greece at the Ancient Olympic Games, and was also held at the other Panhellenic Games. The name derives from Greek words for "five competitions". The event proved popular and lent itself to illustrations on ancient Greek pottery. It also featured in Greek mythology; the mythical hero Perseus fulfilled an oracle's prophecy by accidentally killing Acrisius with a discus while competing in the pentathlon. In mythology, Jason is credited with inventing the pentathlon, and he declared his friend Peleus the first winner of the event, after his victory in the wrestling. The wide variety of skills needed to compete meant that pentathletes were held in high esteem as physical specimens: in Rhetoric, Aristotle remarked "a body capable of enduring all efforts, either of the racecourse or of bodily strength ... This is why the athletes in the pentathlon are most beautiful". 1912 Olympic silver medal winner Ferdinand Bie referenced that story after completing the events.

By the 77th Olympics, the athletic event was usually ordered into the triagmos (long jump, javelin throw, and discus throw), followed by the stadion foot race, and wrestling as the final event. Unlike modern athletics, the first three events did not appear as individual events outside the pentathlon format. Other variations on the format included boxing or pankration instead of the stadion race.

=== Modern Olympics ===
The pentathlon made its return as an Olympic event at the 1906 Games in Athens, consisting of a standing long jump, discus throw (ancient style), javelin throw, 192-metre run, and a Greco-Roman wrestling match.

The 1912 Summer Olympics saw the introduction of two new types of the pentathlon. The first was the classic pentathlon, an athletics competition which was a variation on the Ancient Olympic pentathlon, comprising the long jump, javelin throw, 200 metres, discus throw, and a 1500 metres race. The competition featured at the 1920 and 1924 Summer Olympics but was discontinued thereafter.

The second type of pentathlon introduced at the 1912 Olympics was the modern pentathlon, a sport invented by Pierre de Coubertin and modeled on the Ancient Olympic ideal of testing skills required by a soldier. Working from the template of a 19th-century soldier fighting behind enemy lines, the contest comprises épée fencing, pistol shooting, freestyle swimming, show jumping on the back of an unfamiliar horse allocated in a draw, and a cross country run. Competitors score points based on their performance in each event and the winner is the one with the highest total points at the end of the fifth competition. The men's individual competition has been held at every Olympic Games since 1912, and a women's competition was introduced in the 2000 Summer Olympics. Also, a men's team event was held between 1952 and 1992.

An athletics pentathlon event for women was introduced at the 1964 Summer Olympics in Tokyo, featuring the 80 metres hurdles, shot put and high jump on the first day, with long jump, and 200 metres on the second day. The 1976 and 1980 Summer Olympics versions changed the format from 80 to 100 metres hurdles, and 200 to 800 metres. The event was discontinued in 1984, when it was replaced by the heptathlon.

== Styles ==
=== Ancient pentathlon ===
Events
Long jump
Javelin throw
Greek style discus throw
Stadion
Wrestling

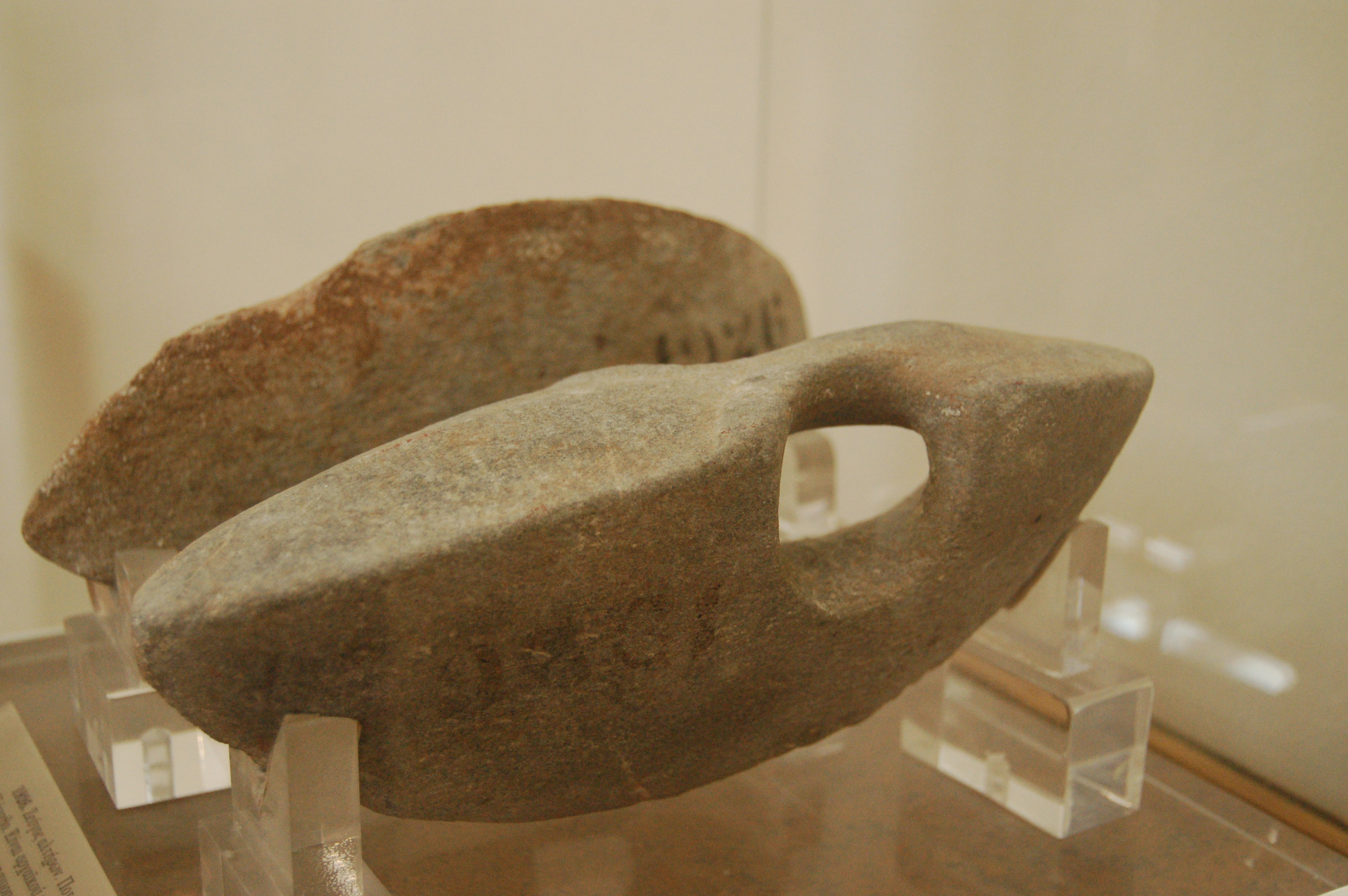
Halteres were held by athletes in the ancient long jump to push themselves further.

The format for the Ancient Olympic pentathlon varied in schedule and events. The stadion event was occasionally replaced by boxing or pankration. The discus throw was competed in the Greek style—the athletes would throw the discus from a raised platform. The long jump was aided by the use of halteres; stone weights which athletes would hold and swing to help propel themselves further. The stadion race was generally around 190 metres long, the length of the Stadium at Olympia.

=== Modern pentathlon ===
Events
Shooting
Swimming
Fencing
Equestrian
Cross country running

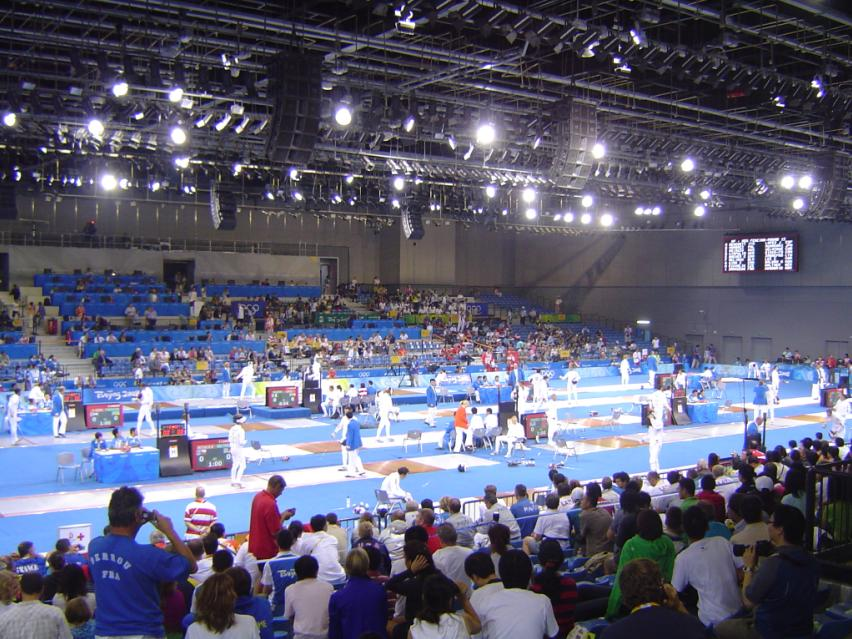
All competitors face each other once in the fencing event.

The sport is governed by the International Modern Pentathlon Union (UIPM) and, in addition to the contests held at the Olympics, a world championships is held in non-Olympic years.

For much of its history, the modern pentathlon remained largely unchanged from the original events featured at the 1912 Olympics. However, in the 2000 Summer Olympics the 300 m freestyle swimming race was reduced to 200 m, and the 4000 m cross country race was reduced to 3000 m.

The fencing (épée) event is the only one in which competitors face off directly against each other, with each competitor having to fence each of the opponents once. The épée duel lasts up to one minute; the winner is the first to land a hit, but the bout is drawn if the minute elapses with both opponents unscathed. The riding discipline involves show jumping over a 350–450 m course with 12 to 15 obstacles. Competitors are paired with horses in a draw 20 minutes before the start of the event. The shooting discipline involves using a 4.5 mm air pistol in the standing position from 10 metres distance at a stationary target.

However, in 2009 the UIPM proposed that the running and shooting events should be combined into a single event, similar to the biathlon. Some commentators have suggested that the sport should be renamed as a "tetrathlon", given the number of competitions, but the sporting body emphasizes that five distinct skills are still applied in the course of the competition. The 'combined' event is the last event of the pentathlon program, and consists of a continuous shoot-run race. Competitors are ordered at the start line by their cumulative point standing from the three previous event, making the race a chase event for overall placing. As of 2012, the format of the combined event is a 4x800 run loop, with a 10m air pistol component at the beginning of each loop. Competitors have to hit the target 5 times before continuing on to the next run loop. In 2011, the UIPM introduced laser shooting in the combined event to replace traditional pellets.

=== Athletics pentathlons ===
Given that there are a large number of track and field events, there have been numerous pentathlons featuring a variety of events.

==== Classic pentathlon ====
Events
Long jump
Javelin throw
200 metres
Discus throw
1500 metres

The Classic pentathlon was contested in Olympic Games from 1906 through 1924. In the 1912 Olympic Games, Jim Thorpe won both the pentathlon and decathlon titles, only to have them later taken away for professionalism. His titles were restored some 70 years later by the International Olympic Committee.

In the United States, this version of the pentathlon was contested as an Amateur Athletic Union (AAU) championship event until 1978. With the breakup of the AAU, as a result of the Amateur Sports Act of 1978, track and field came under separate leadership. The Athletics Congress (TAC) (now USA Track & Field), chose to drop the pentathlon, as well as several other multi-event contests, as national championship events at the senior level, although it is recognised at the 11–12 and 13–14 age groups as national championship events. The last National AAU Pentathlon Championships was held in Honolulu, Hawaii in 1978.

Pentathlons are used at high school athletics and in other one-day meetings for time constraints. The events are separated by age and sex, but the five events are the same for both – sprint hurdles, long jump, shot put, high jump, and middle distance run. At the U12 level, the sprint hurdles are 80 metres (30"), the shot put weighs six pounds, and the middle-distance run being 1500 metres for boys and 800 metres for girls. At the U14 level, the sprint hurdles are 100 metres (33" for boys, 30" for girls), and the shot put is 4 kg (about three pounds heavier) for boys.

==== Indoor pentathlon ====
Events
60 metres hurdles
High jump
Shot put
Long jump
800 metres

For each event, points are given based on a standard. These points can be calculated at the USATF website. The indoor pentathlon is held over a one-day period. Each athlete completes one event at the same time, then there is a 30-minute break until the next event.

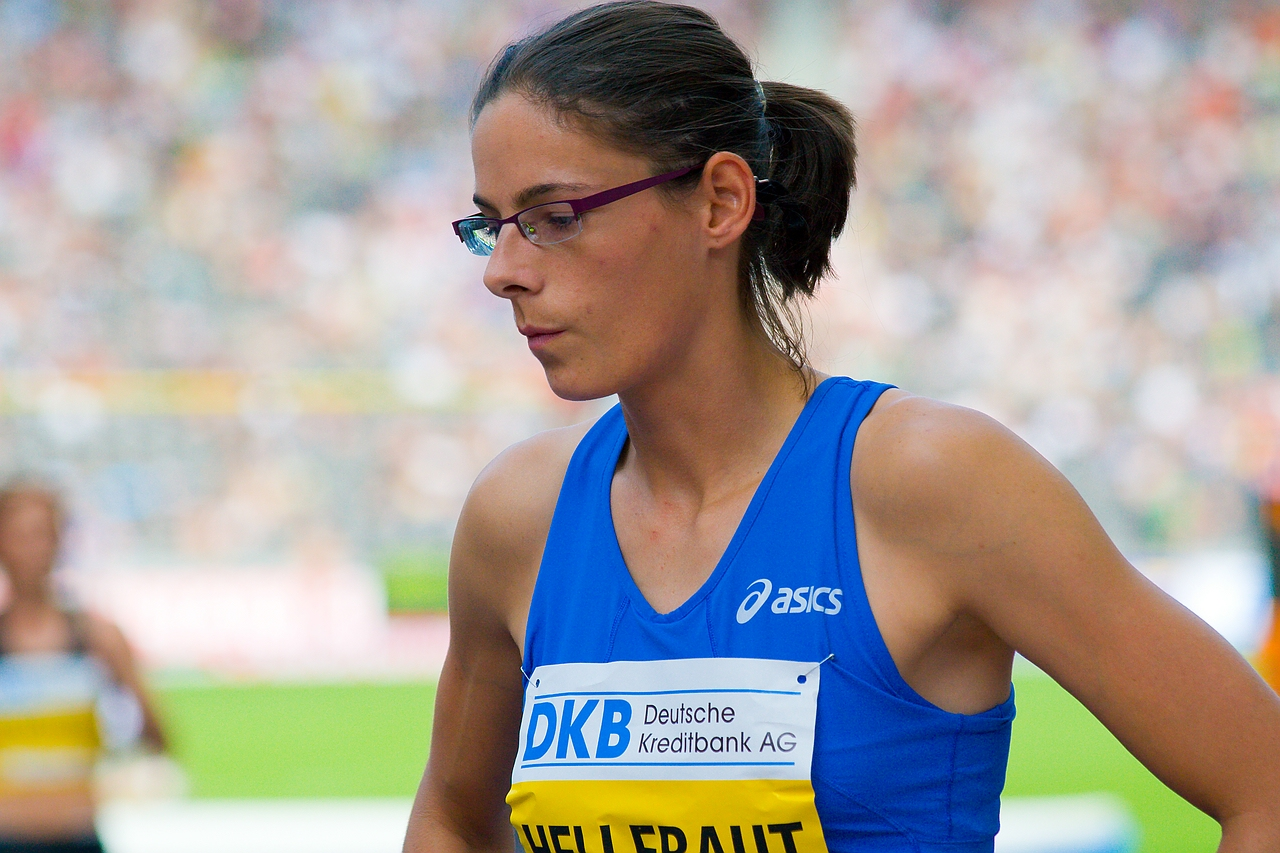
Tia Hellebaut was the 2008 World Indoor pentathlon gold medallist.

Currently, Nafissatou Thiam holds the world record of 5055 points, which occurred on March 3, 2023 in Istanbul, Turkey. The International Association of Athletics Federations (IAAF), the world governing body for athletics, has a women's pentathlon contest at the World Indoor Championships in Athletics. The athletes competing in the format are usually heptathlon specialists, as the events are very similar to that combined event. Until 2000, men also contested the indoor pentathlon.

The men's pentathlon was added to the IAAF list of indoor world records in 1990, at the same time as the men's heptathlon.

==== Paralympic pentathlon ====
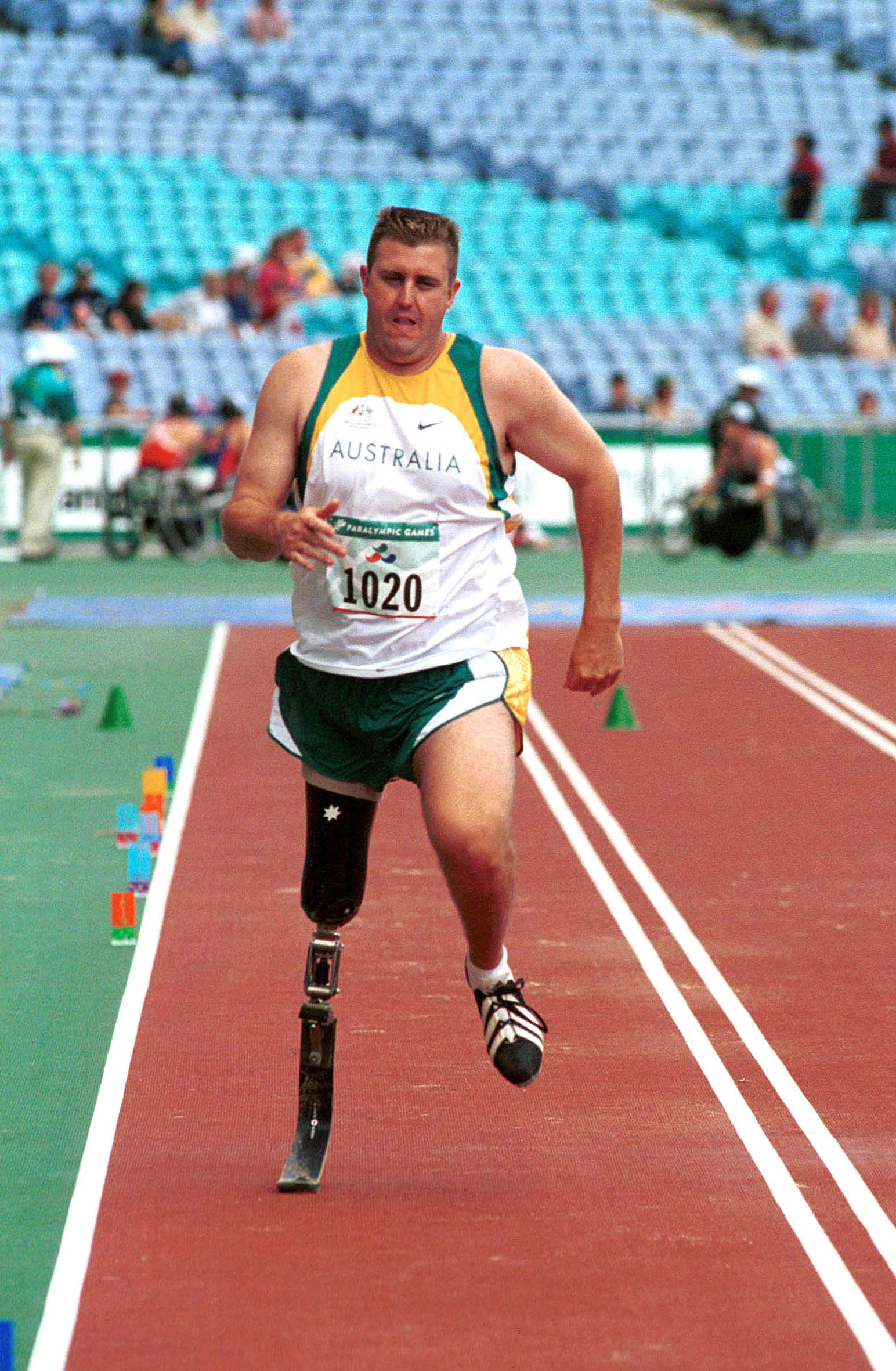
Action shot of Australian field pentathlete Wayne Bell sprinting in the long jump event during pentathlon competition at the 2000 Summer Paralympics

Events
| Vis. imp. | Amputee | Spinal |
|---|---|---|
| Long jump | | Shot put |
| Javelin throw | Shot put | Javelin throw |
| 100 metres | | 200 metres |
Discus throw
| 1500 metres | 400 metres | 1500 metres |

The events contested at the Summer Paralympics varied according to whether the athletes were visually impaired, amputees or spinal disorders. The events shown on the right are taken from the schedule for the 2004 Summer Paralympics. No pentathlon events were held in the 2012 Summer Paralympics.

=== Military events ===
| Military pentathlon | Naval pentathlon | Aeronautical pentathlon |
|---|---|---|
| Shooting | Obstacle race | Shooting |
| Obstacle running | Life saving swimming race | Fencing |
| Obstacle swimming | Utility swimming race | Orienteering |
| Throwing | Seamanship race | Basketball skills |
| Cross country running | Amphibious cross-country race | Obstacle course |
| | | Swimming |

==== Military and naval pentathlon ====
By the middle of the 20th century, many of the skills in the modern pentathlon were becoming less relevant to the modern soldier (such as fencing and horse riding). A French army officer, Captain Henri Debrus, adapted a military training method into a five event competition. The five events are: shooting, obstacle running, obstacle swimming, throwing, and cross country running.

The sport is governed by the International Military Sports Council (CISM) and an annual world championships has been held since 1950.

==== Aeronautical pentathlon ====
Aeronautical pentathlon is a sporting event at some multi-sport events, such as the Military World Games. Despite the name, the sport has six events: shooting, fencing, orienteering, basketball skills, obstacle course, and swimming. The idea is to prepare athletes for evading enemy soldiers. It is generally only participated by military Air Forces, and its first appearance at the Military World Games was in 2011.
