= Pentathlon (disambiguation) =

A pentathlon (Ancient Greek: Πένταθλον) is any sporting competition including five events.

Pentathlon may refer to:

== Sports ==
There are many specific pentathlons consisting of certain sets of events.

- Ancient Olympic pentathlon, an Ancient Greek game comprising long jump, javelin, discus, foot race, and wrestling
- Modern pentathlon, a combined sport for modern Olympic Games
- Athletics pentathlon, a combined sport of five track and field events
  - Classic pentathlon, a men's Olympic event from 1906 to 1924
  - Indoor pentathlon, a combined sport of five track and field events
  - Paralympic pentathlon, a combined sport for the Paralympic Games
  - Throws pentathlon, a combined sport of five field throwing events
  - Women's pentathlon, a combined sport for female athletes, replaced in 1984 by the heptathlon
- Aeronautical pentathlon
- Military pentathlon
- Naval pentathlon
- British Pentathlon, professional darts tournament

== Media ==
- Pentathlon (film), American 1994 film
