= World Military Track and Field Championships =

International athletics tournament

The World Military Track & Field Championships are the world championships of athletics organized by the International Military Sports Council (CISM). Initially an annual competition, the championships have been held on an irregular schedule since 1971. The 2011 Championships was the 44th edition.

The 37th (1995), 38th (1999), 41st (2003), 42nd (2007) and 44th (2011) editions coincided with the first five editions of the Summer Military World Games.

In addition to this outdoor competition, a World Military Indoor Athletics Cup was staged in 2009 in Athens.

== Editions ==
From 2011 the track and field world championships are the track and field competitions of the Military World Games.

Edition	Venue	Country	Date	Notes
1st	Berlin	Allied-occupied Germany	7–8 September 1946	
2nd	Berlin	Allied-occupied Germany	13–14 September 1947	
3rd	Brussels	Belgium	4 September 1948	
4th	Bordeaux	France	22 August-9 September 1949	
5th	Pau	France	5–10 September 1950	
6th	Rome	Italy	23 September-5 October 1951	
7th	Copenhagen	Denmark	13–14 September 1952	
8th	Brussels	Belgium	24–25 July 1953	
9th	Tilburg	Netherlands	30–31 July 1954	
10th	Athens	Greece	29 July-6 August 1955	
11th	West Berlin	West Berlin	3–5 August 1956	
12th	Athens	Greece	14–17 July 1957	
13th	Brussels	Belgium	29–31 August 1958	
14th	Rome	Italy	29–31 October 1959	
15th	Athens	Greece	2–4 July 1960	
16th	Brussels	Belgium	18–20 August 1961	
17th	's-Hertogenbosch	Netherlands	3–5 August 1962	
18th	Brussels	Belgium	23–25 August 1963	
19th	La Coruña	Spain	6–9 August 1964	
20th	Thessaloniki	Greece	31 July - 1 August 1965	
21st	La Coruña	Spain	2–3 July 1966	
22nd	Athens	Greece	5–7 July 1968	
23rd	Poitiers	France	12–14 July 1969	
24th	Viareggio	Italy	12–14 June 1970	
25th	Turku	Finland	19–21 August 1971	
26th	Florence	Italy	6–8 June 1973	
27th	Rio de Janeiro	Brazil	24–26 August 1976	
28th	Mikkeli	Finland	15–17 August 1978	
29th	Algiers	Algeria	1–8 July 1979	
30th	São Paulo	Brazil	7–9 November 1980	
31st	Alexandria	Egypt	14–16 October 1984	
32nd	Rome	Italy	11–13 September 1986	
33rd	Warendorf	Germany	24–26 June 1987	
34th	Rome	Italy	20–22 September 1989	
35th	Kajaani	Finland	27–29 July 1990	
36th	Tours	France	28–30 August 1993	
37th	Rome	Italy	13–15 September 1995	
38th	Zagreb	Croatia	8–17 August 1999	
39th	Beirut	Lebanon	1–4 July 2001	
40th	Tivoli	Italy	4–7 September 2002	
41st	Catania	Italy	4–11 December 2003	
42nd	Hyderabad	India	14–21 October 2007	
43rd	Sofia	Bulgaria	6–13 June 2009	
44th	Rio de Janeiro	Brazil	15–24 July 2011	
45th	Mungyeong	South Korea	4–8 October 2015	

== See also ==
- Inter-Allied Games
- World Military Championships
- Military World Games
- World Military Cross Country Championships
