= CISM Military World Cadet Games =

International multi-sport games for military cadets organized by CISM

- Flag of the International Military Sports Council (CISM)
- Motto: Friendship through Sport
- Organiser: International Military Sports Council (CISM)
- Website: www.milsport.one/cism-games/cism-military-world-cadet-games

The CISM Military World Cadet Games (often shortened to CISM World Cadet Games) are an international multi-sport event for military cadets organized by the International Military Sports Council (CISM). Created as a youth-focused complement to the Military World Games, the series brings together officer-cadets and equivalent trainees from CISM member nations to compete across Olympic and CISM-specific disciplines while promoting CISM's motto, Friendship through Sport. CISM lists four editions to date: Ankara (2010), Salinas/Quito (2014), Saint Petersburg (2022) and Caracas (2024).

== History ==
Following the establishment of the Military World Games, CISM launched a cadet-level, multi-sport format in 2010 to provide international competitive experience earlier in a service member's career and to reinforce CISM values among future officers. The first Games were staged in Ankara on 17–24 October 2010. The second edition was hosted by Ecuador in 2014 (events around Salinas and Quito) from 30 August to 5 September 2014, with shooting and other sports on the programme. After postponement from 2020, the third edition was held in Saint Petersburg on 4–12 August 2022; the programme comprised seven sports. The fourth edition opened in Caracas in August 2024, with the competition week of 16–24 August (opening ceremony activities on 18 August).

The 2026 Games were awarded to Astana, but were subsequently postponed on request from the Kazakh government.

== Sports ==
Programmes typically mix Olympic sports (e.g., athletics/track and field, swimming, volleyball, shooting) with CISM's military pentathlon and other military-specific disciplines. For example, the 2022 programme comprised seven sports: summer biathlon, shooting, military pentathlon, swimming, orienteering, track and field, and volleyball.

== Editions ==
Year	Games	Host city (cities)	Country	Dates	Notes
2010	I	Ankara	Turkey	17 – 24 October	Orienteering team results and other event records published.
2014	II	Salinas / Quito	Ecuador	30 August – 5 September	Shooting and other sports with official results.
2022	III	Saint Petersburg	Russia	4 – 12 August	Seven sports programme; daily reports and shooting result hub.
2024	IV	Caracas	Venezuela	16 – 24 August	Opening ceremony and competition reported; opening on 18 August.

== Medal table (2014) ==
Complete medal standings for the 2010 games are not readily available. The final medal table for the 2014 games in Ecuador is listed below, sourced from the official press release by the Ministry of National Defense of Ecuador.

Rank	Nation	Gold	Silver	Bronze	Total
1	Russia	13	11	7	31
2	Ecuador	3	3	5	11
3	Venezuela	3	2	3	8
4	Turkey	2	1	2	5
5	Romania	1	1	3	5
6	Colombia	1	1	2	4
7	Saudi Arabia	0	2	0	2
8	Lithuania	0	1	1	2
9	Finland	0	1	0	1
10	Canada	0	0	1	1
Total	(10 nations)	23	23	24	70

== See also ==
- Military World Games
- International Military Sports Council
