= Military sports =

Forms of competitive activity

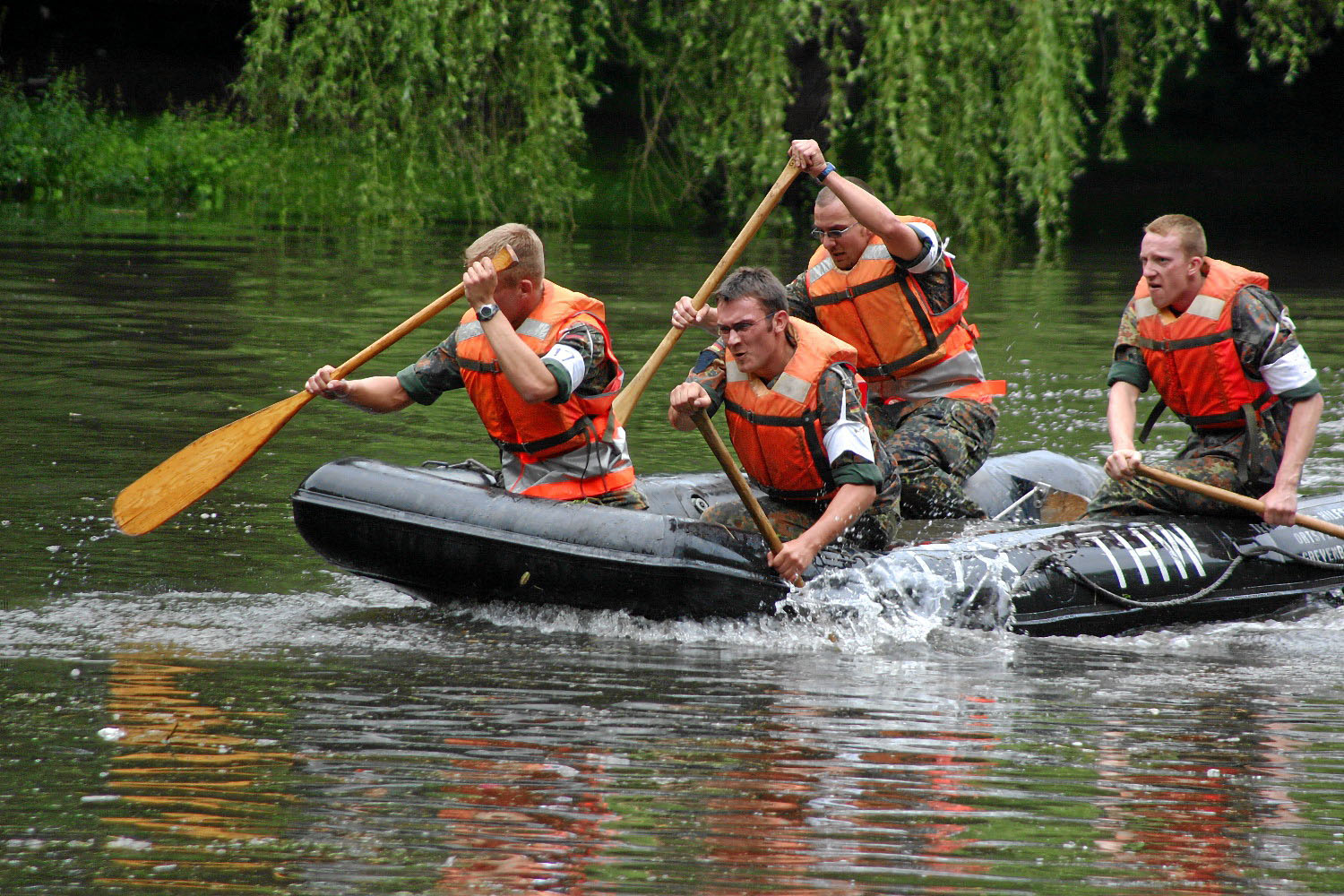
Paddling at an international military games event, Germany

Military sports are sports practiced by the military. They are the subject of international competitions, such as the Military World Games, with an objective relating to the physical training of military. Particular sports may be chosen to improve combat readiness, skill, toughness, the development of physical qualities of the soldier, and professional proficiency based on the different areas of the military action: land, sea and air.

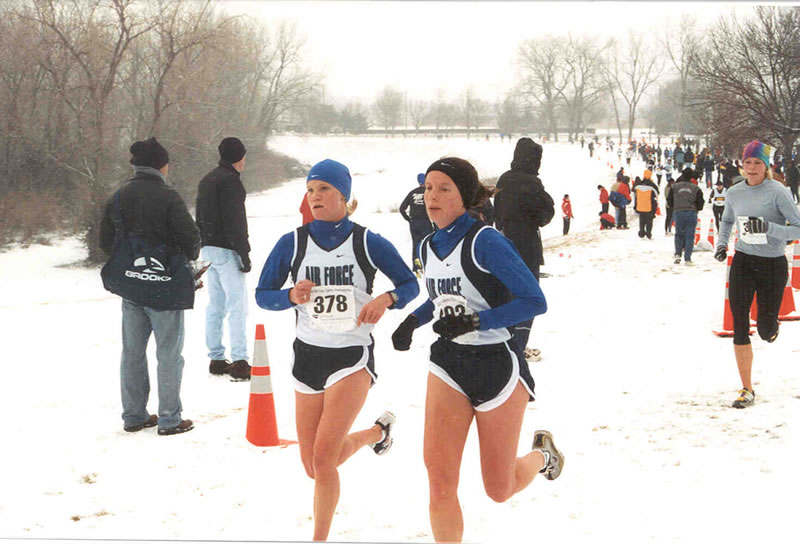
U.S. Air Force women personnel taking part in a cross country race on a snowy park in USA.

== History ==
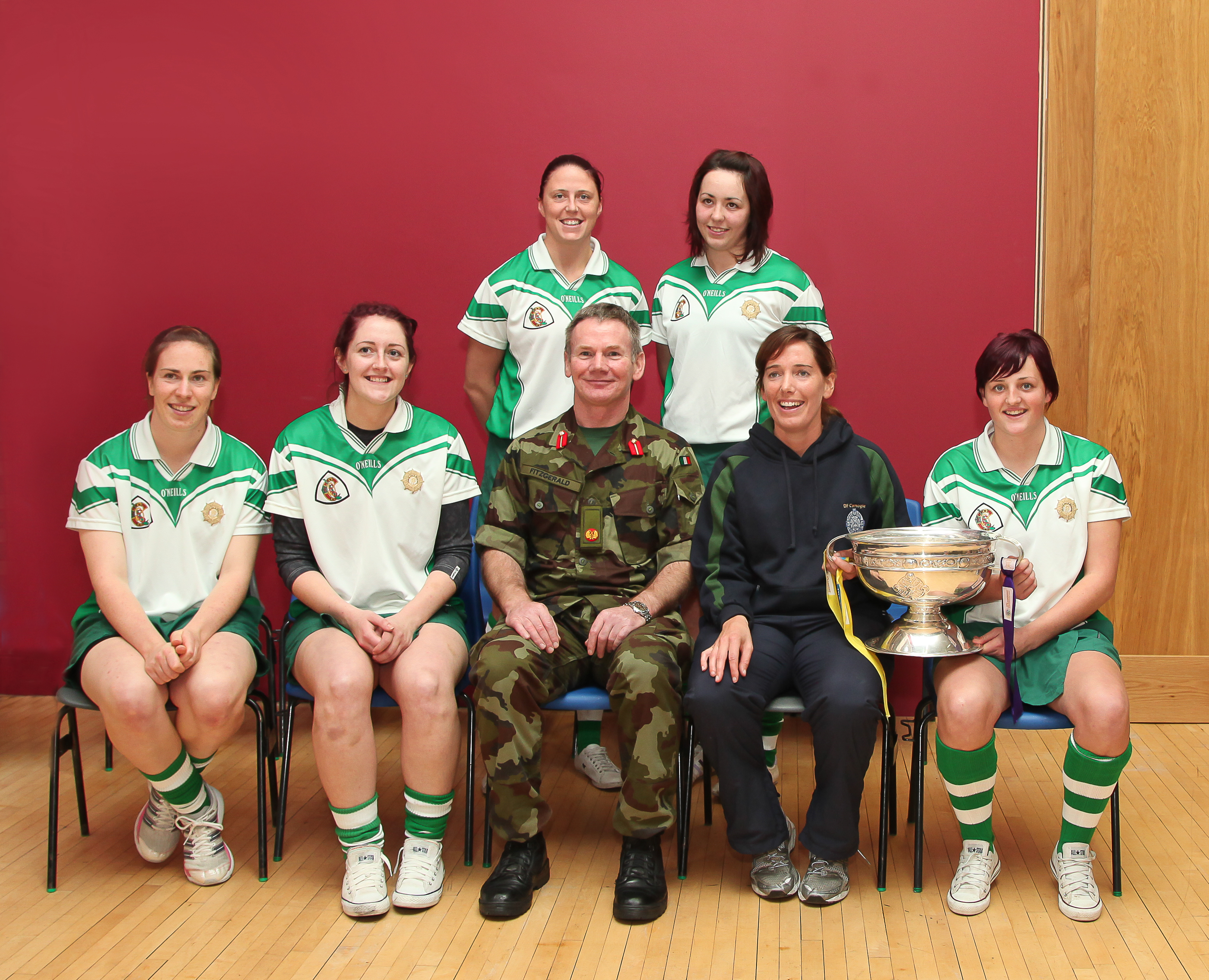
Women's Camogie team of Irish military with their male military commander.

In 1858 Archibald MacLaren opened a gymnasium at the University of Oxford, England and in 1860 instituted a training regimen for 12 non-commissioned officers and their officer Major Frederick Hammersley at the university. This regimen was assimilated into the training of the British Army, which formed the Army Gymnastic Staff in 1861 and made sport an important part of military life.

In the United States, the first Inter-service Sports Council (ISSC) meeting was held in 1947. Today, Armed Forces Sports in the U.S. are run through the Department of Defense.

Since its foundation in 1948, the purpose of the International Military Sports Council (IMSC; or Conseil International du Sport Militarie (CISM)) was to organize and structure a body that would adapt and serve as physical training for the different branches of the armed forces.

== Sports ==
There are 26 disciplines recognized by CISM; some are exclusively military sports.

- Aeronautical pentathlon^{*}
- Basketball
- Boxing
- Cross country running
- Cycling (Cyclo-cross, Mountain biking, and Road)
- Equestrian (Dressage, Endurance, Eventing, and Jumping)
- Fencing
- Football
- Golf
- Handball
- Judo
- Marathon
- Military pentathlon^{*}
- Modern pentathlon
- Naval pentathlon^{*}
- Orienteering
- Parachuting (Accuracy landing and Formation skydiving)
- Sailing
- Shooting
- Skiing (Alpine, Biathlon, Cross-country, Mountaineering, Orienteering, and Patrol)
- Swimming (includes Lifesaving)
- Taekwondo
- Track and field
- Triathlon
- Volleyball (indoor and beach)
- Wrestling

Short track speed skating and sport climbing have also been contested at the CISM World Winter Games.

Notes: ^{*} — purely military sport

== See also ==
- History of physical training and fitness
- International Military Sports Council
- Invictus Games
- Military World Games
- Tank biathlon
- Warrior Games
- World Military Championships
- International Army Games
