= 1999 Military World Games =

International multi-sport event

1999 Military World Games Svjetske vojne igre 1999
- Host city: Zagreb
- Country: Croatia
- Nations: 82
- Athletes: 6734
- Events: 20 (+2 demonstration)
- Opening: August 8, 1999
- Closing: August 17, 1999
- Main venue: Stadion Maksimir

The 1999 Military World Games was the second edition of the global multi-sport event for military personnel, organised by the International Military Sports Council (CISM). It was hosted in Zagreb, Croatia from 8 to 17 August.

Mar del Plata, Argentina, was the original choice of host, but withdrew due to organisational problems. The opening ceremony was held at the Stadion Maksimir, which also served as a venue for the association football matches. Russia easily topped the medal table with 46 golds among its 112 medals. China was the next most successful with 29 golds in its haul of 66 medals, while Italy ranked third with sixteen gold medals. The hosts Croatia performed well given their comparative size, finishing fourth with eleven gold medals.

A total of twenty-two sports were contested at the competition. An increase of five from the previous edition in 1995. Four swimming world records were broken during the competition: Lorenzo Vismara set records in the 50-metre and 100-metre freestyle swimming events, while his compatriot Emiliano Brembilla also broke freestyle records over the 400-metre and 1500-metre distances.

== Sports ==
- Athletics
- Basketball
- Boxing
- Canoeing
- Cycling
- Diving
- Fencing
- Football
- Handball
- Judo
- Lifesaving (demonstration)
- Military pentathlon
- Naval pentathlon
- Orienteering
- Rowing (demonstration)
- Shooting
- Swimming
- Taekwondo
- Triathlon
- Water polo
- Wrestling
- Volleyball

== Venues ==
Venue	Event(s)
Stadion Maksimir	Opening ceremony and football
Galgovo Stadium	Football
Stadium Sisak	Football
Vrapčanski Potok	Shooting
Lučko Airport	Parachuting (pentathlon)
Officers' School Jastrebarsko	Military pentathlon
Jarun SRC	Naval pentathlon, triathlon, rowing, canoeing
Delnice, Vrh Svetih Treh Kraljev, Ponikve	Orienteering
Mladost Stadium	Athletics
Sutinska Vela	Judo
Peščenica Sports Hall	Wrestling
Dom Sportova	Boxing, handball
Zagreb Fair	Fencing
Karlovac Sports Hall	Taekwondo
Mladost SRC, Šalata SRC	Swimming, lifesaving, diving, water polo
Kutija Šibica	Handball
Dražen Petrović Basketball Hall	Basketball, Volleyball
Mladost Volleyball Centre	Volleyball
Kres Sports Hall, Trnsko	Volleyball

== Medal table ==
Rank	Nation	Gold	Silver	Bronze	Total
1	Russia	46	35	31	112
2	China	29	21	16	66
3	Italy	16	20	21	57
4	Croatia	11	12	20	43
5	South Korea	10	4	4	18
6	Germany	9	11	12	32
7	France	9	5	10	24
8	United States	8	10	8	26
9	Ukraine	7	17	13	37
10	North Korea	6	5	8	19
11	Slovenia	6	4	5	15
12	Poland	5	3	4	12
13	Belarus	5	2	14	21
14	Austria	4	6	5	15
15	Kenya	4	5	5	14
16	Latvia	4	1	1	6
17	Netherlands	2	2	2	6
18	Bulgaria	2	2	1	5
19	Azerbaijan	2	1	6	9
20	Algeria	2	1	0	3
21	Ireland	2	0	3	5
22	Brazil	1	4	3	8
23	Romania	1	2	1	4
24	Finland	1	1	1	3
24	Turkey	1	1	1	3
26	Belgium	1	0	3	4
26	Egypt	1	0	3	4
28	Qatar	1	0	1	2
28	Tunisia	1	0	1	2
30	Senegal	1	0	0	1
30	Tanzania	1	0	0	1
32	Greece	0	7	2	9
33	Norway	0	5	7	12
34	Lesotho	0	3	1	4
35	Czech Republic	0	2	1	3
36	Cyprus	0	2	0	2
37	Slovakia	0	1	4	5
38	Lithuania	0	1	3	4
39	Georgia	0	1	2	3
40	Saudi Arabia	0	1	1	2
41	Namibia	0	1	0	1
42	South Africa	0	0	2	2
42	Switzerland	0	0	2	2
44	Barbados	0	0	1	1
44	Botswana	0	0	1	1
44	Canada	0	0	1	1
44	Ivory Coast	0	0	1	1
44	Spain	0	0	1	1
44	Sudan	0	0	1	1
44	Sweden	0	0	1	1
Totals (50 entries)		199	199	235	633
