= World Military Championships =

Military sports championships

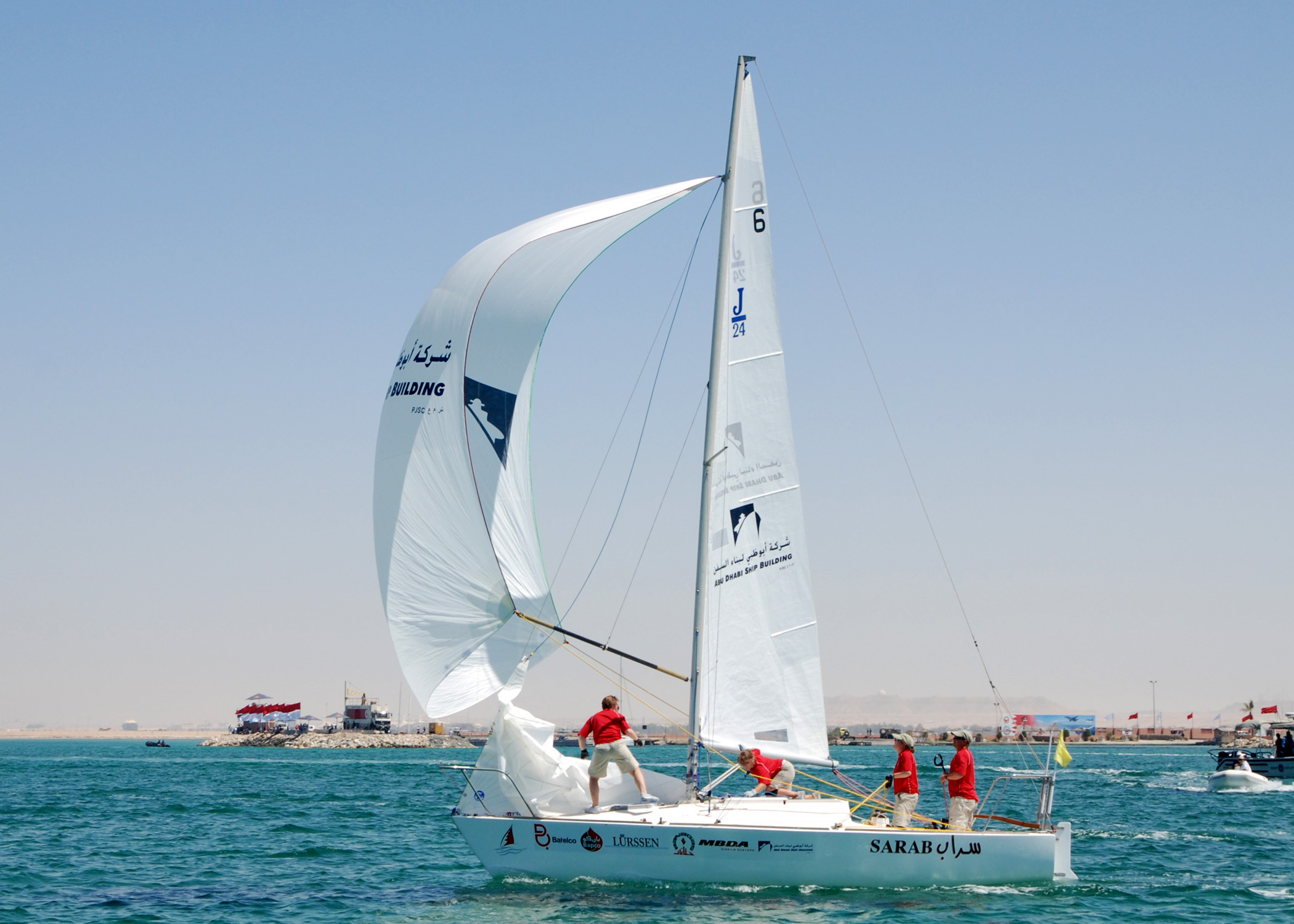
Sailing at the 44th World Military Sailing Championship, in 2010.

The World Military Championships (WMC) are the world championships of the military sports, regularly organized by the Conseil International du Sport Militaire (CISM), covering 25 sports.

== History ==
CISM had its roots in World War II, with efforts to bring together members of the allied forces to bridge cultural and language barriers. This took place under the auspices of the Allied Forces Sports Council. By 1947, the Soviet Union and eastern bloc nations had withdrawn from the Council, followed by the United States and United Kingdom. The French armed forces picked up the concept and organised CISM with France, Belgium, Denmark, Luxembourg and the Netherlands as founding members under the motto "Friendship through sport". By 1985, eighty-two nations were competing. Military athletes often are competing against Olympic competitors in CISM games and World Military Championships, earning the nickname "The Military Olympics.

== Championships ==
In the year of the Military World Games (from 1995, every four years), championship shall be the same of the World Games tournament.

| # | Event | First Edition | Last Edition | Ref |
Military Sports
| 1 | World Military Pentathlon Championship | 1950 | 64th (2017) | |
| 2 | World Military Aeronautical Pentathlon Championship | 1948 | 57th (2015) | |
| 3 | World Military Naval Pentathlon Championship | 1954 | 50th (2015) | |
| 4 | World Military Modern Pentathlon Championship | 1963 | 45th (2017) | |
| 5 | World Military Triathlon Championship | 1992 | 19th (2017) | |
| 6 | World Military Orienteering Championship | 1965 | 50th (2017) | |
| 7 | World Military Parachuting Championship | 1964 | 41st (2017) | |
| 8 | World Military Sailing Championship | 1949 | 52nd (2021) | |
Combat Sports
| 9 | World Military Boxing Championship | 1947 | 58th (2021) | |
| 10 | World Military Fencing Championship | 1947 | 45th (2017) | |
| 11 | World Military Judo Championship | 1966 | 37th (2016) | |
| 12 | World Military Taekwondo Championship | 1980 | 34th (2011) | |
| 13 | World Military Wrestling Championship | 1961 | 32nd (2017) | |
Main Sports
| 14 | World Military Track and Field Championship | 1946 | 45th (2015) | |
| 15 | World Military Cross Country Championship | 1947 | 57th (2017) | |
| 16 | World Military Marathon Championship | | 50th (2018) | |
| 17 | World Military Swimming & Lifesaving Championship | 1946 | 49th (2017) | |
| 18 | World Military Shooting Championship | 1957 | 55th (2025) | |
| 19 | World Military Archery Championship | 2017 | 1st (2017) | |
| 20 | World Military Cycling Road Championship | | 20th (2018) | |
| 21 | World Military Cycling Mountain Bike Championship | | 21st (2018) | |
Team Sports
| 22 | World Military Basketball Championship | 1950 | 2015 M / 2016 W | |
| 23 | World Military Football Championship | 1946 | 2017 M / 2018 W | |
| 24 | World Military Handball Championship | 1982 | | |
| 25 | World Military Volleyball Championship | 1961 | 2016 M / 2017 W | |
Winter Sports
| 26 | World Military Skiing Championship | 1954 | 55th (2023) | |
Other Sports
| 27 | World Military Equestrian Championship | 1969 | 20th (2017) | |
| 28 | World Military Golf Championship | 2003 | 11th (2017) | |

== World Cup ==
New Events

== See also ==
- International Military Sports Council
- Military World Games
- World University Championships
- World School Championships
