= World Military Basketball Championship =

Annual competition for military personnel

World Military Basketball Championship is a championship annually held in the beginning of summer between men and women serving in the military from around the world.

== 2009 ==
=== Preliminary round ===
The 2009 championship was held in Klaipėda, Lithuania. Ten nations participated in this event in Taikos 61 Sports Center in Klaipėda, Lithuania. The arrival of the teams occurred on June 6, 2009. The nations were divided into two groups of five. In the preliminary round, nations would battle each other once for a total of 4 games. Then, the top two teams would qualify to the finals (1st-4th place), and the next two teams would qualify to relegation round (5th-8th place). Teams will depart on June 15, 2009.

==== Group A ====
	Team	Pld	W	L	PF	PA	Diff
1.	Lithuania	4	4	0	352	245	+107
2.	Kazakhstan	4	3	1	302	305	– 3
3.	Latvia	4	2	2	298	283	+15
4.	Italy	4	1	3	221	270	–49
5.	Cyprus	4	0	4	222	292	–70

==== Group B ====
	Team	Pld	W	L	PF	PA	Diff
1.	Greece	4	3	1	333	291	+42
2.	United States	4	2	2	355	332	+23
3.	China	4	2	2	316	347	–31
4.	Germany	4	2	2	339	340	– 1
5.	South Korea	4	1	3	341	362	–21

=== Finals ===
Semi-finals
13 June - Taikos 61
Greece	93
Kazakhstan	73
13 June - Taikos 61
Lithuania	76
United States	72

Final
14 June – Taikos 61
Greece	86
Lithuania	69
Third place
14 June - Taikos 61
Kazakhstan	90
United States	97

=== 5th - 8th place ===
Semi-finals
13 June - Taikos 61
China	83
Italy	68
13 June - Taikos 61
Germany
Latvia

Final
14 June – Taikos 61
China	73
Germany	86
Third place
14 June - Taikos 61
Italy	62
Latvia	72

=== Standings ===
1. Greece
2. Lithuania
3. United States
4. Kazakhstan
5. Germany
6. China
7. Latvia
8. Italy
9. South Korea
10. Cyprus

Source: Delfi News.

== See also ==
- International Military Sports Council
- Military World Games
