= 1995 Military World Games =

International multi-sport event

1995 Military World Games 1995 Giochi mondiali militari
- Host city: Rome
- Country: Italy
- Nations: 93
- Athletes: 4017
- Events: 17
- Opening: September 4, 1995
- Closing: September 16, 1995
- Main venue: Stadio Olimpico

The 1995 Military World Games, the first edition of the Military World Games, were held in Rome, Italy from 4 September to 16 September.

== Sports ==
- Athletics (30) ()
- Basketball (1) ()
- Boxing (12) ()
- Cycling (2) ()
- Diving (4) ()
- Fencing (10) ()
- Equestrian (5) ()
- Football (1) ()
- Judo (13) ()
- Lifesaving (7) ()
- Military pentathlon (3) ()
- Modern pentathlon (4) ()
- Naval pentathlon (5) ()
- Parachuting (5) ()
- Shooting (17) ()
- Swimming (26) ()
- Triathlon (5) ()
- Volleyball (2) ()
- Water polo (1) ()
- Wrestling (20) ()

== Medal table ==
* Host nation (Italy)

Rank	Nation	Gold	Silver	Bronze	Total
1	Russia (RUS)	62	28	37	127
2	Italy (ITA)*	22	16	13	51
3	China (CHN)	11	20	15	46
4	France (FRA)	9	13	15	37
5	North Korea (PRK)	9	8	5	22
6	Germany (GER)	8	16	22	46
7	Ukraine (UKR)	7	14	9	30
8	United States (USA)	6	7	8	21
9	Turkey (TUR)	6	1	2	9
10	Poland (POL)	4	5	8	17
11	Romania (ROU)	4	5	6	15
12	Kenya (KEN)	4	3	5	12
13	Belgium (BEL)	3	3	3	9
14	Sweden (SWE)	3	1	1	5
15	Iran (IRN)	2	5	3	10
16	Austria (AUT)	2	0	0	2
17	South Korea (KOR)	1	5	8	14
18	Finland (FIN)	1	5	1	7
19	Norway (NOR)	1	3	3	7
20	Morocco (MAR)	1	2	2	5
20	Slovakia (SVK)	1	2	2	5
22	Netherlands (NED)	1	1	1	3
22	Saudi Arabia (SAU)	1	1	1	3
24	Azerbaijan (AZE)	1	1	0	2
24	Czech Republic (CZE)	1	1	0	2
26	Kazakhstan (KAZ)	1	0	3	4
27	Armenia (ARM)	1	0	2	3
27	Hungary (HUN)	1	0	2	3
27	Switzerland (SUI)	1	0	2	3
27	Syria (SYR)	1	0	2	3
31	Canada (CAN)	1	0	0	1
31	Gabon (GAB)	1	0	0	1
31	United Arab Emirates (UAE)	1	0	0	1
34	Belarus (BLR)	0	4	8	12
35	Thailand (THA)	0	3	3	6
36	Brazil (BRA)	0	1	2	3
37	Algeria (ALG)	0	1	0	1
37	Ireland (IRL)	0	1	0	1
37	Mongolia (MGL)	0	1	0	1
40	Bulgaria (BUL)	0	0	4	4
41	Estonia (EST)	0	0	2	2
41	Slovenia (SLO)	0	0	2	2
43	Croatia (CRO)	0	0	1	1
43	Denmark (DEN)	0	0	1	1
43	Greece (GRE)	0	0	1	1
43	Portugal (POR)	0	0	1	1
Totals (46 entries)		179	177	206	562

== See also ==
- Track and field at the Military World Games
