= World Military Pentathlon Championship =

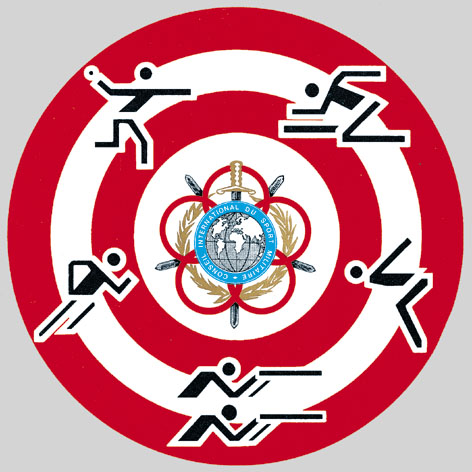
Official logo of military pentathlon by CISM

The World Military Pentathlon Championship are the world championships of military pentathlon organized every year by International Military Sports Council (CISM) from 1950.

== Editions and champions ==
Ed.	Year	Held	Champions		
Ed.	Year	Held	Individual	Team	Obstacle relay
1	1950	Antibes France	(France) Émile Guegen	France	-
2	1951	Antibes (2) France	(Sweden) Bengt Lorichs	Sweden	-
3	1952	Brussels Belgium	(Sweden) Bengt Lorichs	Sweden	-
4	1953	Stockholm Sweden	(Sweden) Åke Moberg	Sweden	-
5	1954	Antibes (3) France	(Sweden) Åke Moberg	Sweden	-
6	1955	Breda Netherlands	(Sweden) Göran Rönnquist	Sweden	-
7	1956	Antibes (4) France	(France) Mohamed Abdesselem	France	-
8	1957	Brussels (2) Belgium	(France) Mohamed Abdesselem	France	-
9	1958	Athens Greece	(United States) James Moore	France	-
10	1959	Kristianstad Sweden	(Sweden) Stig-Erik Lekberg	Sweden	-
11	1960	Rio de Janeiro Brazil	(Brazil) Nilo Jaime Ferreira da Silva	Brazil	-
12	1961	Paris France	(France) Mohamed Sahli	Sweden	-
13	1962	Brussels (3) Belgium	(Sweden) Bengt Åke Christensson	Sweden	-
14	1963	Rome Italy	(Belgium) Michael Ooms	Sweden	-
15	1964	Haslemoen Norway	(Sweden) Bengt Åke Christensson	Sweden	-
16	1965	Schaarsbergen Netherlands	(Sweden) Christer Bjerkhagent	Brazil	-
17	1966	Bordeaux France	(Sweden) Bengt Åke Christensson	France	-
18	1967	Uppsala Sweden	(Sweden) Bengt Åke Christensson	Sweden	-
19	1968	Rio de Janeiro (2) Brazil	(Sweden) Bengt Åke Christensson	Sweden	-
20	1970	Morón Argentina	(France) Jacques Langbour	Sweden	-
21	1971	Örebro Sweden	(Sweden) Rolf Nilsson	Sweden	-
22	1973	Wiener Neustadt Austria	(France) Vincent Moreau	Austria	-
23	1974	Skive Denmark	(West Germany) Hartmut Nienaber	France	-
24	1975	El Palomar Argentina	(Switzerland) Ernst Engeli	Sweden	-
25	1976	Bordeaux (2) France	(West Germany) Hartmut Nienaber	West Germany	-
26	1977	Kristinehamn Sweden	(West Germany) Hartmut Nienaber	Sweden	-
27	1978	Wiener Neustadt (2) Austria	(West Germany) Hartmut Nienaber	West Germany	-
28	1979	Vatneleiren Norway	(West Germany) Hartmut Nienaber	West Germany	-
29	1980	München West Germany	(West Germany) Hartmut Nienaber	West Germany	-
30	1981	Bremgarten Switzerland	(Switzerland) Ernst Engeli	Switzerland	-
31	1983	Farum Denmark	(West Germany) Hartmut Nienaber	China	-
32	1984	Den Bosch Netherlands	(Norway) Geir Todal	Switzerland	-
33	1985	Rio de Janeiro (3) Brazil	(Brazil) Ribamar Juvino Bandeira	Brazil	-
34	1986	Wiener Neustadt (3) Austria	(West Germany) Hartmut Nienaber	China	-
35	1987	Stockholm (2) Sweden	(West Germany) Hartmut Nienaber	Brazil	-
36	1988	Beijing China	(China) Yanng Chunyi	China	-
37	1989	Caracas Venezuela	(China) Liang Xifen	China	-
38	1990	München (2) Germany	(Brazil) Ribamar Juvino Bandeira	Brazil	-
39	1991	Oslo Norway	(Brazil) Ribamar Juvino Bandeira	Brazil	-
40	1992	Bremgarten (2) Switzerland	(China) Li Zhong	China	-
41	1993	Skive (2) Denmark	(China) Xinquiao Guo	China	-
42	1994	Resende Brazil	(Brazil) Ribamar Juvino Bandeira	Brazil	-
43	1995	Rome (2) Italy	(China) Li Zhong	China	China
44	1996	Wiener Neustadt (4) Austria	(China) Zhao Min	China	China
45	1997	Kristinehamn (2) Sweden	(Brazil) Carlos Alberto Silva	China	China
46	1998	Beijing (2) China	(China) Li Zhong	China	Turkey
47	1999	Zagreb Croatia	(China) Yang Chunyi	China	Turkey
48	2000	Holstebro Denmark	(China) liu Wei	China	Norway
49	2001	Arlon Belgium	(Brazil) Carlos Alberto Silva	China	China
50	2002	Schaarsbergen (2) Netherlands	(Austria) Stefano Palma	China	Turkey
51	2003	Toledo Spain	(China) Feng Liwen	China	Venezuela
52	2004	Santiago Chile	(China) He Shugan	China	Ecuador e Peru
53	2006	Wiener Neustadt (5) Austria	(China) Yang Shiwei	China	Austria
54	2007 (Note: The same competition of military pentathlon of the IV Military World Games.)	Hyderabad India	(Belarus) Maksim Kanafin	China	Ecuador
55	2008	Ankara Turkey	(China) Yang Shiwei	China	Turkey
56	2009	München (3) Germany	(Germany) Robert Krawczyk	China	Venezuela
57	2010	Schaarsbergen (3) Netherlands	(Denmark) Brian Dåsbjerg		
58	2011	Rio de Janeiro (4) Brazil	(China) He Shugan		
59	2012	Lahti Finland	(Latvia) Dainis Stepe		
60	2013	Rio de Janeiro (5) Brazil	(Brazil) Douglas Castro		
61	2014	Yeongcheon South Korea	(China) Gong Guobao	Russia	
62	2015	Yeongcheon (2) South Korea	(Russia) Sergei Alpatov	Russia	
63	2016	Wiener Neustadt (6) Austria	(Russia) Sergei Alpatov	Brazil	
64	2017	Salinas Ecuador	(China) Pan Yucheng	China	
65	2018	Wiener Neustadt (6) Austria	(Russia) Sergei Alpatov	Russia	
66	2019	Wuhan China	(China) Pan Yucheng	China	

== See also ==
- Military pentathlon
- Military World Games
