= Obstacle swimming =

Sport of swimming through an obstacle course

Obstacle swimming is a sport in which competitors swim through a water course that includes obstacles that impede their path between the starting and finishing point. It has been an event at various international sporting competitions like the 1900 Summer Olympics. It is also one of the five events that are a part of the military pentathlon, and has been used as a part of recruitment competitions for the Royal Marines. Progressing through underwater obstacles has also been integrated into the obstacle courses of the American Ninja Warrior competition.
