= 2007 Military World Games =

Sporting event

IV Military World Games 2007 विश्व सैन्य खेल
- Host city: Hyderabad
- Country: India
- Motto: Friendship Through Sport
- Nations: 101
- Athletes: 5,000+
- Events: 14
- Opening: 14 October 2007
- Closing: 21 October 2007
- Opened by: Pratibha Patil
- Main venue: Balayogi Athletic Stadium

Summer

Winter

The 2007 Military World Games, officially the 4th CISM Military World Games were held at the twin-cities Hyderabad - Secunderabad, Andhra Pradesh, India from 14–21 October 2007. Some parts of the games were also held in Mumbai.

According to press release by the organizers nearly 5000 athletes from 101 countries participated. The motto of the games was Friendship Through Sport. Russia emerged on top of the medal tally with 42 gold, 29 silver and 29 bronze medals. The People's Republic of China, second with 38 gold, 22 silver and 13 bronze while Germany came a distant third with 7 gold, 10 silver and 13 bronze.

== Games ==
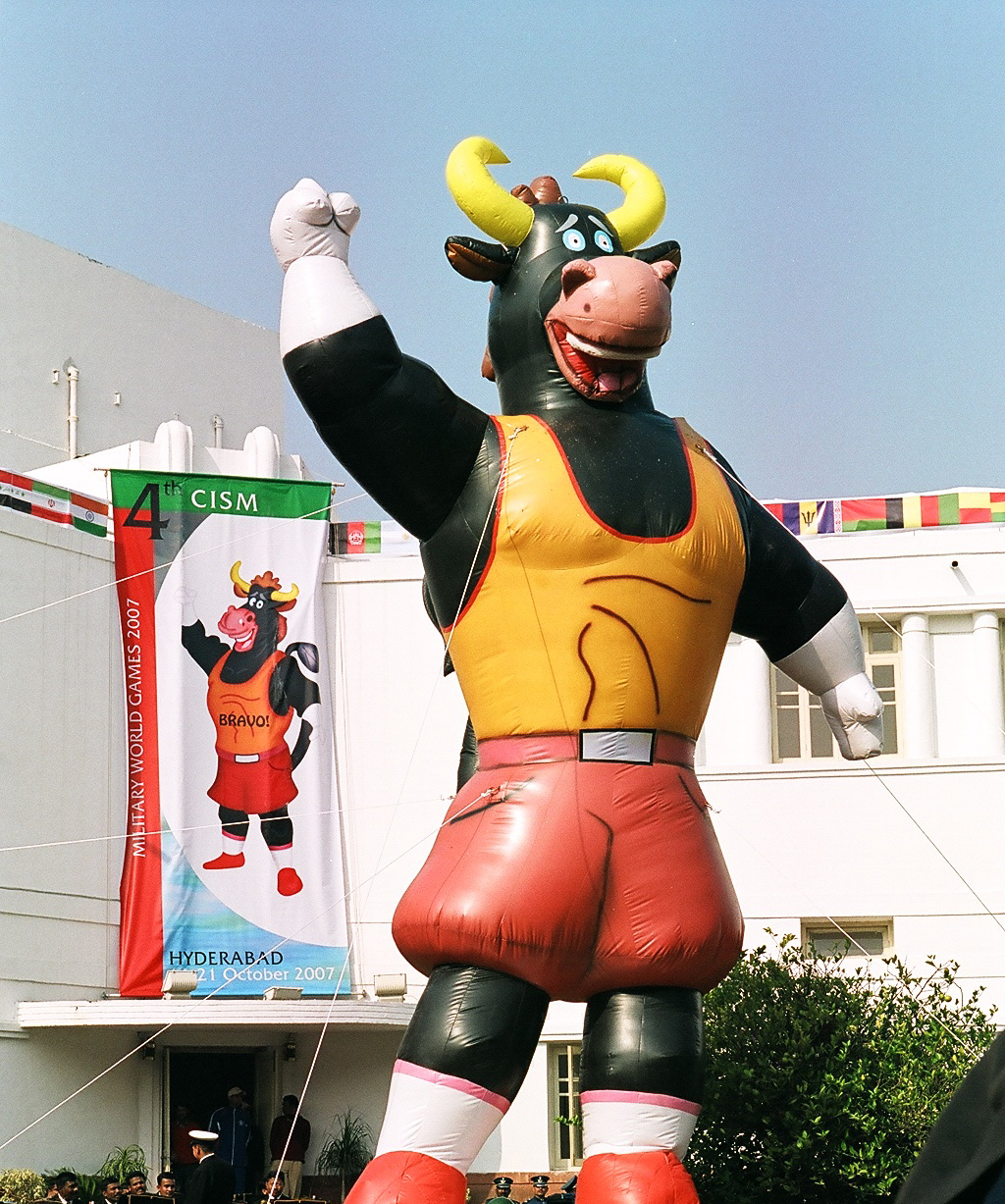
'Bravo' the mascot for 4th Military World Games to be held at Hyderabad and Mumbai on 4–11 October 2007

The Military Games torch began its journey from Leh to Kanya Kumari on 4 August 2007 and reached New Delhi on 5 August 2007. The blasts in August 2007 at two locations in the venue city of the games created doubt as to whether the games would be held, but the organizers confirmed the event would be on schedule and as planned. It was later known that the terror cell that carried the blasts in the city also planned to attack the military games.

The opening ceremony of the games was held at the GMC Balayogi Stadium, Hyderabad. President of India Pratibha Patil declared the games open. Games ended on 21 October. The Defence Minister of India, Shri A. K. Antony declared the games closed at the G. M. C. Balayogi Athletic Stadium.

=== Sports ===
A total of fourteen sports were contested at the Games.

- Boxing
- Diving
- Football
- Handball
- Judo
- Military pentathlon
- Parachuting
- Sailing
- Shooting
- Swimming
- Track and field
- Triathlon
- Volleyball
- Wrestling

== Medal table ==
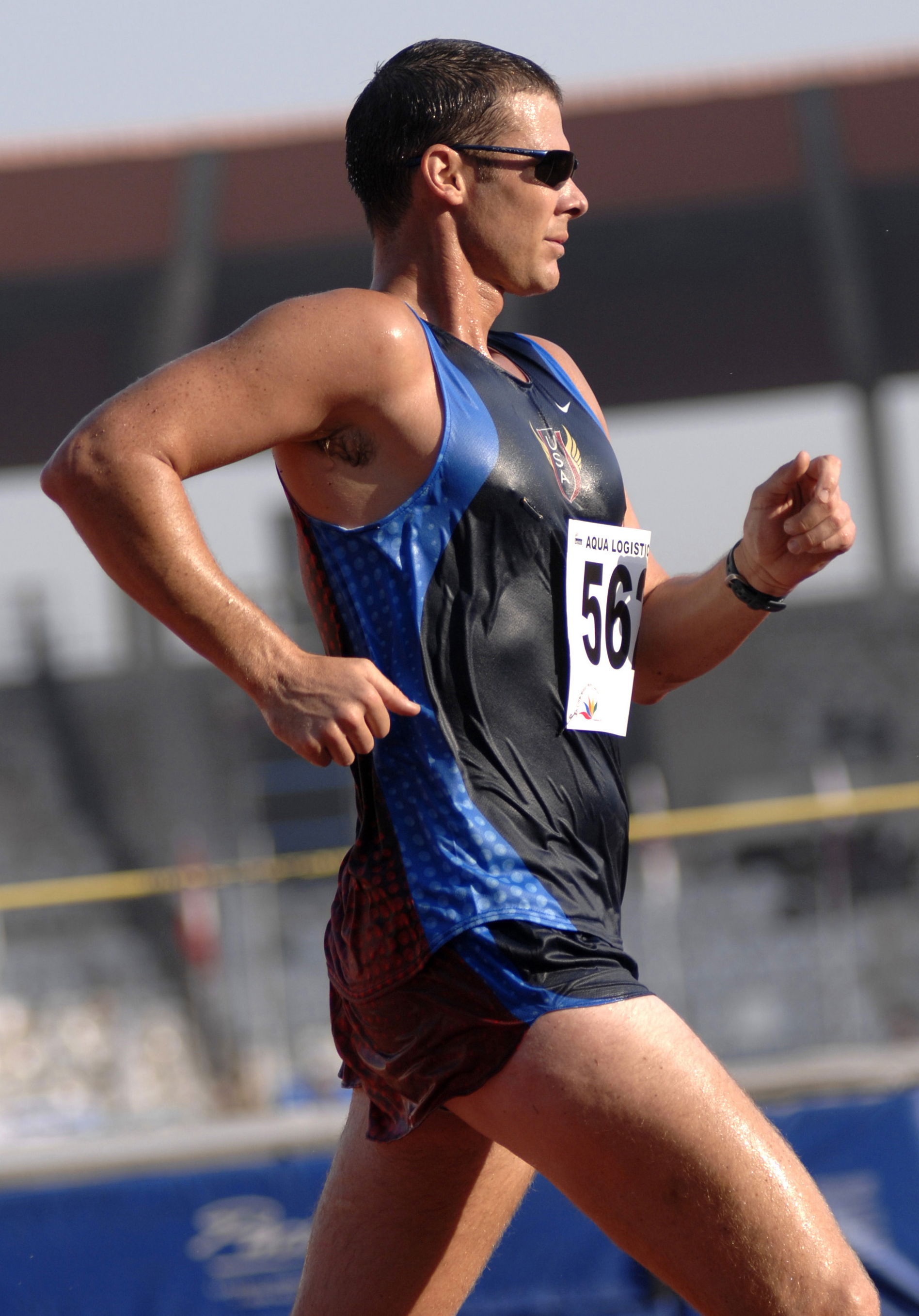
U.S. Army Sgt. John Nunn speed walks during the Military World Games competition in Hyderabad, India

* Host nation (India)

Rank	Nation	Gold	Silver	Bronze	Total
1	Russia (RUS)	42	29	29	100
2	China (CHN)	38	22	13	73
3	Germany (GER)	7	10	13	30
4	Italy (ITA)	7	8	14	29
5	Ukraine (UKR)	5	6	15	26
6	Kenya (KEN)	5	5	2	12
7	Uzbekistan (UZB)	5	2	7	14
8	Poland (POL)	4	5	7	16
9	Slovenia (SLO)	4	4	1	9
10	Saudi Arabia (KSA)	4	0	1	5
11	North Korea (PRK)	3	8	10	21
12	Greece (GRE)	3	5	3	11
13	Turkey (TUR)	3	2	4	9
14	Belarus (BLR)	2	10	11	23
15	United States (USA)	2	6	2	10
16	South Korea (KOR)	2	4	7	13
17	Norway (NOR)	2	3	0	5
18	Romania (ROU)	2	2	5	9
19	Austria (AUT)	2	1	9	12
20	India (IND)*	2	1	7	10
21	Slovakia (SVK)	2	1	1	4
22	Netherlands (NED)	2	0	2	4
23	Belgium (BEL)	2	0	0	2
24	Qatar (QAT)	1	2	2	5
25	Sudan (SUD)	1	1	1	3
26	Morocco (MAR)	1	1	0	2
27	Sri Lanka (SRI)	1	0	1	2
28	Ecuador (ECU)	1	0	0	1
28	Egypt (EGY)	1	0	0	1
28	Estonia (EST)	1	0	0	1
31	Azerbaijan (AZE)	0	3	1	4
32	Iran (IRI)	0	2	2	4
33	Brazil (BRA)	0	2	1	3
33	Finland (FIN)	0	2	1	3
33	Latvia (LAT)	0	2	1	3
36	France (FRA)	0	1	5	6
37	Bahrain (BHR)	0	1	3	4
38	Czech Republic (CZE)	0	1	2	3
39	Switzerland (SUI)	0	1	1	2
39	Tunisia (TUN)	0	1	1	2
41	Bulgaria (BUL)	0	1	0	1
41	Cameroon (CMR)	0	1	0	1
41	Hungary (HUN)	0	1	0	1
44	Lithuania (LTU)	0	0	6	6
45	Algeria (ALG)	0	0	4	4
46	United Arab Emirates (UAE)	0	0	2	2
47	Afghanistan (AFG)	0	0	1	1
47	Denmark (DEN)	0	0	1	1
47	Spain (ESP)	0	0	1	1
Totals (49 entries)		157	157	200	514

== Participating nations ==
- Afghanistan
- Albania
- Algeria
- Angola
- Argentina (27)
- Austria
- Azerbaijan
- Brunei
- Bangladesh
- Barbados
- Belarus (166)
- Belgium
- Bhutan
- Bosnia and Herzegovina
- Botswana (25)
- Brazil
- Bulgaria
- Burkina Faso
- Burundi
- Central African Republic (2)
- Cameroon
- Canada (165)
- Cape Verde
- Chad
- Chile
- China
- Colombia
- Croatia
- Czech Republic (40)
- Cyprus (32)
- Democratic Republic of the Congo
- Denmark
- Egypt
- Ecuador
- Eritrea
- Estonia
- Finland (42)
- France
- Gabon
- Germany
- Greece
- Guinea
- Hungary (23)
- India
- Iran
- Iraq
- Ireland (62)
- Italy
- Ivory Coast
- Jamaica (12)
- Jordan
- Kenya (34)
- Kuwait
- Latvia (68)
- Lebanon
- Lesotho
- Libya
- Lithuania
- Luxembourg (13)
- Macedonia
- Maldives
- Mali
- Mauritania
- Morocco
- Montenegro
- Myanmar
- Namibia (16)
- Nepal
- Netherlands (93)
- Niger
- North Korea
- Norway (54)
- Oman
- Peru
- Poland (109)
- Portugal (6)
- Qatar (42)
- Republic of the Congo
- Romania (93)
- Russia
- Rwanda
- Saudi Arabia
- Senegal
- Serbia
- Slovakia (64)
- Slovenia (55)
- South Africa (67)
- South Korea
- Spain
- Sri Lanka (47)
- Sudan
- Suriname
- Sweden (79)
- Switzerland (53)
- Tanzania
- Togo
- Tunisia
- Turkey (134)
- Uganda
- Ukraine
- United Arab Emirates
- United States (190)
- Uruguay
- Uzbekistan (55)
- Venezuela
- Vietnam
- Yemen
- Zambia (37)
- Zimbabwe
