= Naval pentathlon =

Multi-sport event

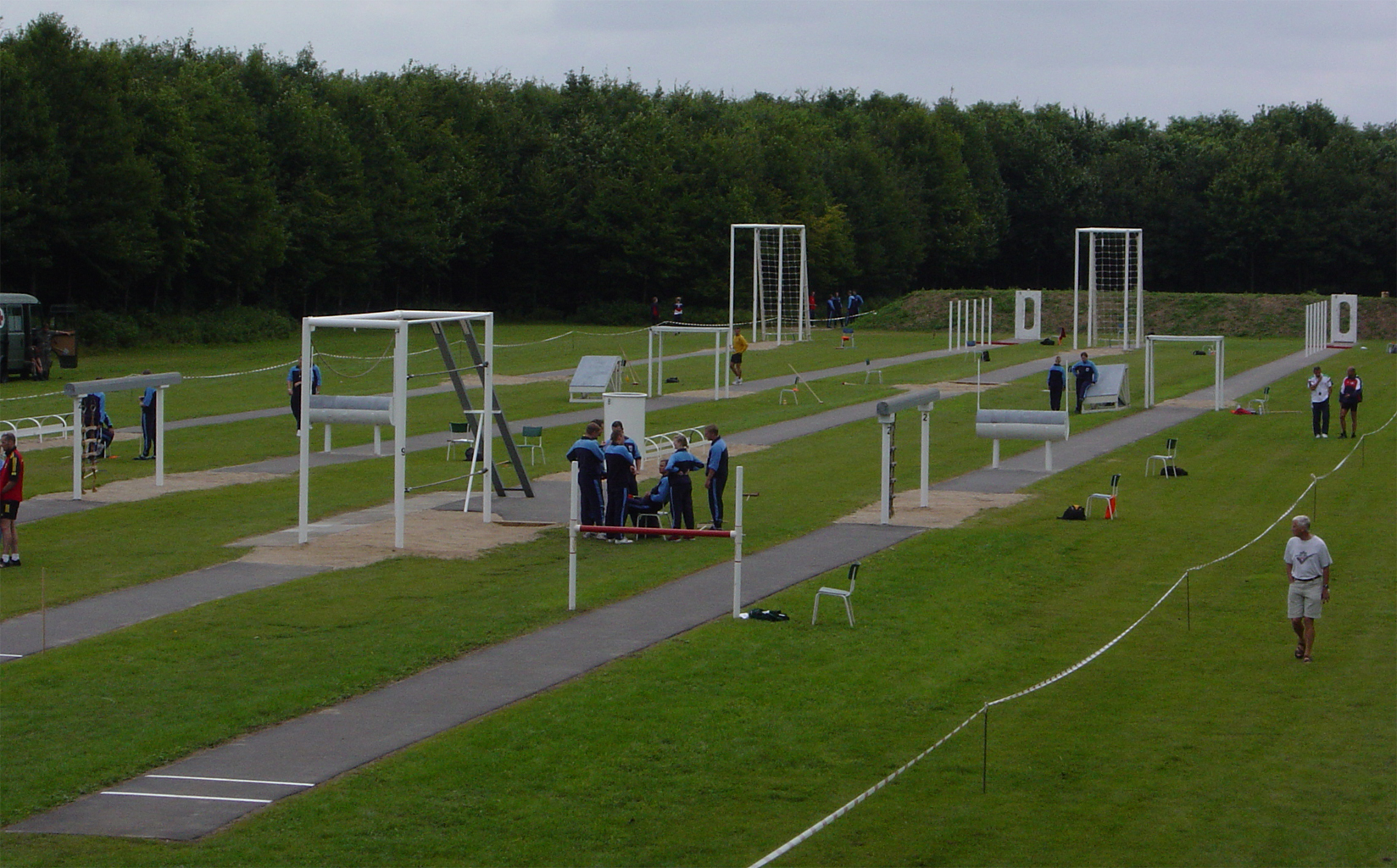
The obstacle race, an event of naval pentathlon at the 2007 Military World Games

The Naval pentathlon is a multisport practiced by military athletes at the World Military Championships and Military World Games, both organized by the CISM, the international federation that governs military sport.

== The five races ==
- Amphibious cross-country
- Lifesaving swimming
- Obstacle race
- Seamanship
- Utility swimming

== See also ==
- International Military Sports Council
- Aeronautical pentathlon
- Military pentathlon
- Military World Games
