= International Military Sports Council =

International sports association

International Military Sports Council Conseil International du Sport Militaire
- Sport: Military sports
- Jurisdiction: International
- Abbreviation: IMSC/CISM
- Founded: 18 February 1948
- Headquarters: Brussels, Belgium
- President: Colonel Nilton Gomes Rolim

Official website
- www.milsport.one
- Motto: Friendship through Sport

The International Military Sports Council (IMSC; French: Conseil International du Sport Militaire, CISM) is an international sports association, established in 1948 and headquartered in Brussels, Belgium. It is the world's second-largest multi-discipline sports organisation, after the International Olympic Committee, holding more than 20 competitions annually. Under its auspices, soldiers who may previously have met on the battlefield compete on the playing field. CISM organises various sporting events, including the Military World Games and World Military Championships, for the armed forces of 140 member countries. The aim of CISM is to promote sport activity and physical education between armed forces as a means to foster world peace. The motto of CISM is "Friendship through Sport" and is based on the three pillars: sport, education and solidarity. Since April 2022, the president of CISM has been Colonel Nilton Gomes Rolim Filho of Brazil.

== History ==
=== Before the CISM ===
In 1919, in the aftermath of the First World War, the Inter-Allied Games were organised by General John Pershing's Allied Forces Sports Council, bringing together 1500 athletes representing 18 nations, to compete in 24 sports. The event was held in Joinville-le-Pont, France.

In May 1946, after the Second World War, the Allied Forces Sports Council was revived by Colonel Henri Debrus and Olympic pentathlete Major Raoul Mollet, and over the weekend of 7–8 September that year, the second Inter-Allied Games took place in Berlin, at the Olympiastadion, venue of the 1936 Olympic Games. The event was also known as the Allied Track and Field Championships, following a similar event in 1945. Twelve nations were due to be represented: Belgium, Czechoslovakia, Denmark, Great Britain, Poland, Greece, Luxembourg, the Netherlands, Norway, the Soviet Union, the United States and hosts Germany, although reports state that only seven took part.

Amid some rancour, the Allied Forces Sports Council was extinguished in 1947.

=== Main development ===
A few months later, taking up where they had left off with the Allied Forces Sports Council, Colonel Debrus and Major Mollet founded the CISM, on 18 February 1948. The founding members were Belgium, Denmark, France, Luxembourg and the Netherlands. In 1950, Argentina and Egypt became members. In 1951, the United States joined. In 1952, Iraq, Lebanon, Pakistan and Syria became members, followed two years later by Brazil. Canada joined in 1985. In 1991, with the end of the Cold War, the rival Warsaw Pact organisation Friendly Armies' Sports Committee (SKDA) merged with CISM, leading to the accession of 31 new member countries from the Pact and others associated with the Soviet Bloc. This expansion led to recognition by international institutions including the IOC. Prior to 1995, CISM organised 15 to 20 world championships each year. Since 1995, CISM has organised the Military World Games, a multi-sport event, every four years.

=== CISM of the Americas ===
The CISM of the Americas Continent is a subordinate organisation that consists of 19 member nations: Argentina, Barbados, Bolivia, Brazil, Canada, Chile, Colombia, Dominican Republic, Ecuador, Guatemala, Guyana, Jamaica, Paraguay, Peru, Suriname, Trinidad and Tobago, United States of America, Uruguay and Venezuela. There are two liaison offices, known as the North American Liaison Office (NALO) and the South American Liaison Office (SALO). Army Colonel Walter Jander, Vice President of CISM of the Americas, served as one of the four CISM Vice Presidents from 2015 to 2019.

== CISM honors and awards ==
CISM Order of Merit
Grand Cordon'	Commander	Grand Officer
Officer	Grand Knight	Knight

CISM Star of Sports Merit
Double Gold Star	Gold Star	Silver Star	Bronze Star

== Goals and organisation ==
=== Solidarity ===
The CISM Solidarity programme is intended as a means to promote sustainable development to strengthen less privileged CISM member countries, in order to create equal opportunities for all CISM nations to participate in CISM events.

Developed some decades ago, Solidarity is one of the two pillars that guide CISM's activities, and inspired the Olympic solidarity model. CISM's solidarity programme has many components, ranging from organising technical clinics in less privileged countries and transporting athletes to championships, to shipping sports equipment to disadvantaged regions. Member countries may send or invite coaches, based either on CISM membership and "Friendship through Sport" or often through bilateral contracts.

The establishment of Regional Development Centres (RDC) is a major objective of the CISM support policy. The first step in this direction was taken in 2006 when the CISM African Development Centre (CAD) was founded in Nairobi, Kenya. A further Regional Development Centre was established in Rio de Janeiro, Brazil.

=== General Assembly ===
A General Assembly, on which all member nations are represented, is the supreme authority of CISM.

== Leadership ==
=== CISM presidents ===
S. No.	Name	Country	Term
1.	Colonel Henri Debrus	France	1948–1953
2.	Major Arne W. Thorburn	Sweden	1953–1956
3.	Colonel Henri Debrus	France	1956–1961
4.	Brigadier-General Royal Hatch	United States	1961–1967
5.	Air Commander M. M. Piracha	Pakistan	1967–1968
6.	Admiral Fazio Casari	Italy	1968–1969
7.	Major-General Kenneth G. Wickham	United States	1969–1970
8.	Counter Admiral Aldo Massarini	Italy	1970–1979
9.	Divisional-General Mohammed Saleh Mokaddem	Tunisia	1979–1986
10.	Divisional-General Jean Duguet	France	1986–1994
11.	General Arthur Zechner	Austria	1994–1998
12.	Major-General Dr. Gianni Gola	Italy	1998–2010
13.	Colonel Hamad Kalkaba Malboum	Cameroon	2010–2014
14.	Colonel Abdulhakim Al-Shino	Bahrain	2014–2018
15.	Colonel Hervé Piccirillo	France	2018–2022
16.	Colonel Nilton Gomes Rolim Filho	Brazil	2022–present

=== Board of directors ===
Designation	Name	Country
President	Colonel Nilton Gomes Rolim Filho	Brazil
Vice-presidents	Brigadier General Rashid Mahboob Al-Dosari (Asia)	Qatar
Vice-presidents	Colonel Dirk Schwede (Europe)	Germany
Vice-presidents	Major General Maikano Abdullahi (Africa)	Nigeria
Vice-presidents	Colonel Delio Rosario Colon	Dominican Republic
Secretary General	Navy Captain Roberto Recchia	Italy
Treasurer General	Colonel Sven Serré	Belgium
Member	General Djabou M’hammed Abdelhak	Algeria
Member	Colonel Sega Sissoko	Mali
Member	Brigadier-General Elijah Ndegwa Gatere	Kenya
Member	Air Vice Marshal Simon Nyowani	Zimbabwe
Member	Colonel Steven Rosso	United States
Member	Colonel Nathalie Birgentzlen	Canada
Member	Colonel Luiz Fernando Toledo Leal	Brazil
Member	Colonel Yijang Wang	China
Member	Brigadier General Zakaryia Kanat	Syria
Member	Colonel Moon-Hak Yoon	South Korea
Member	Major General Oleg Botsman	Russia
Member	Major Jan-Henrik Back	Sweden
Member	Colonel Jose Carlos Garcia-Verdugo	Spain
Member	Lieutenant Colonel Jure Velepec	Slovenia

== CISM events ==
=== Military World Games ===
The Military World Games are a multi-sport event organised every four years since 1995. They are held in the year before the Olympic Games.

- The 1st Military World Games 1995 Military World Games was held in Rome, Italy from 4 to 16 September 1995; 93 nations competed in 17 different sporting events to celebrate the 50th anniversary of the Second World War and of the ratification of the United Nations Organization Charter.
- In August 1999, the 2nd Military World Games 1999 Military World Games was held in Zagreb, Croatia; 7000 participants from 82 nations competed in 20 sports.
- In December 2003, the 3rd Military World Games 2003 Military World Games was held in Catania, Italy; Participants from 84 different nations competed in 13 sports.
- In October 2007, the 4th Military World Games 2007 Military World Games was held in Hyderabad, India; Participants from 101 countries competed in 14 sports.
- In July 2011, the 5th Military World Games 2011 Military World Games was held in Rio de Janeiro, Brazil; Participants from 108 countries competed in 20 sports. Brazil topped the medal table with 45 gold, 33 silver and 36 bronze. China was second with 37 gold, 28 silver and 34 bronze. Italy captured 14 gold, 13 silver and 24 bronze to round out the top three.
- In October 2015, the 6th Military World Games 2015 Military World Games was held in Mungyeong, South Korea; Participants from 105 countries, more 15 as observer, competed in 24 sports, including five military sports. Russia topped the medal table with 59 gold, 43 silver and 33 bronze. Brazil was the second with 34 gold, 26 silver and 24 bronze. China captured 32 gold, 31 silver and 35 bronze to round out the top three.
- In 2019, the 7th CISM World Games took place in Wuhan, China.
- In 2027, the 8th CISM World Games will take place in Charlotte, the United States.

=== World Military Championships ===
In years when the Military World Games are held ( every four years since 1995), the World Games tournament serves as the world championship.

#	Event	First Edition	Last Edition	Ref
Military Sports
1	World Military Pentathlon Championship	1950	64th (2017)	
2	World Military Aeronautical Pentathlon Championship	1948	57th (2015)	
3	World Military Naval Pentathlon Championship	1954	50th (2015)	
4	World Military Modern Pentathlon Championship	1963	45th (2017)	
5	World Military Triathlon Championship	1992	19th (2017)	
6	World Military Orienteering Championship	1965	50th (2017)	
7	World Military Parachuting Championship	1964	41st (2017)	
8	World Military Sailing Championship	1949	52nd (2021)	
Combat Sports
9	World Military Boxing Championship	1947	58th (2021)	
10	World Military Fencing Championship	1947	45th (2017)	
11	World Military Judo Championship	1966	37th (2016)	
12	World Military Taekwondo Championship	1980	34th (2011)	
13	World Military Wrestling Championship	1961	32nd (2017)	
Main Sports
14	World Military Track and Field Championship	1946	45th (2015)	
15	World Military Cross Country Championship	1947	57th (2017)	
16	World Military Marathon Championship		50th (2018)	
17	World Military Swimming & Lifesaving Championship	1946	49th (2017)	
18	World Military Shooting Championship	1957	55th (2025)	
19	World Military Archery Championship	2017	1st (2017)	
20	World Military Cycling Road Championship		20th (2018)	
21	World Military Cycling Mountain Bike Championship		21st (2018)	
Team Sports
22	World Military Basketball Championship	1950	2015 M / 2016 W	
23	World Military Football Championship	1946	2017 M / 2018 W	
24	World Military Handball Championship	1982		
25	World Military Volleyball Championship	1961	2016 M / 2017 W	
Winter Sports
26	World Military Skiing Championship	1954	55th (2023)	
Other Sports
27	World Military Equestrian Championship	1969	20th (2017)	
28	World Military Golf Championship	2003	11th (2017)	

== Sports ==
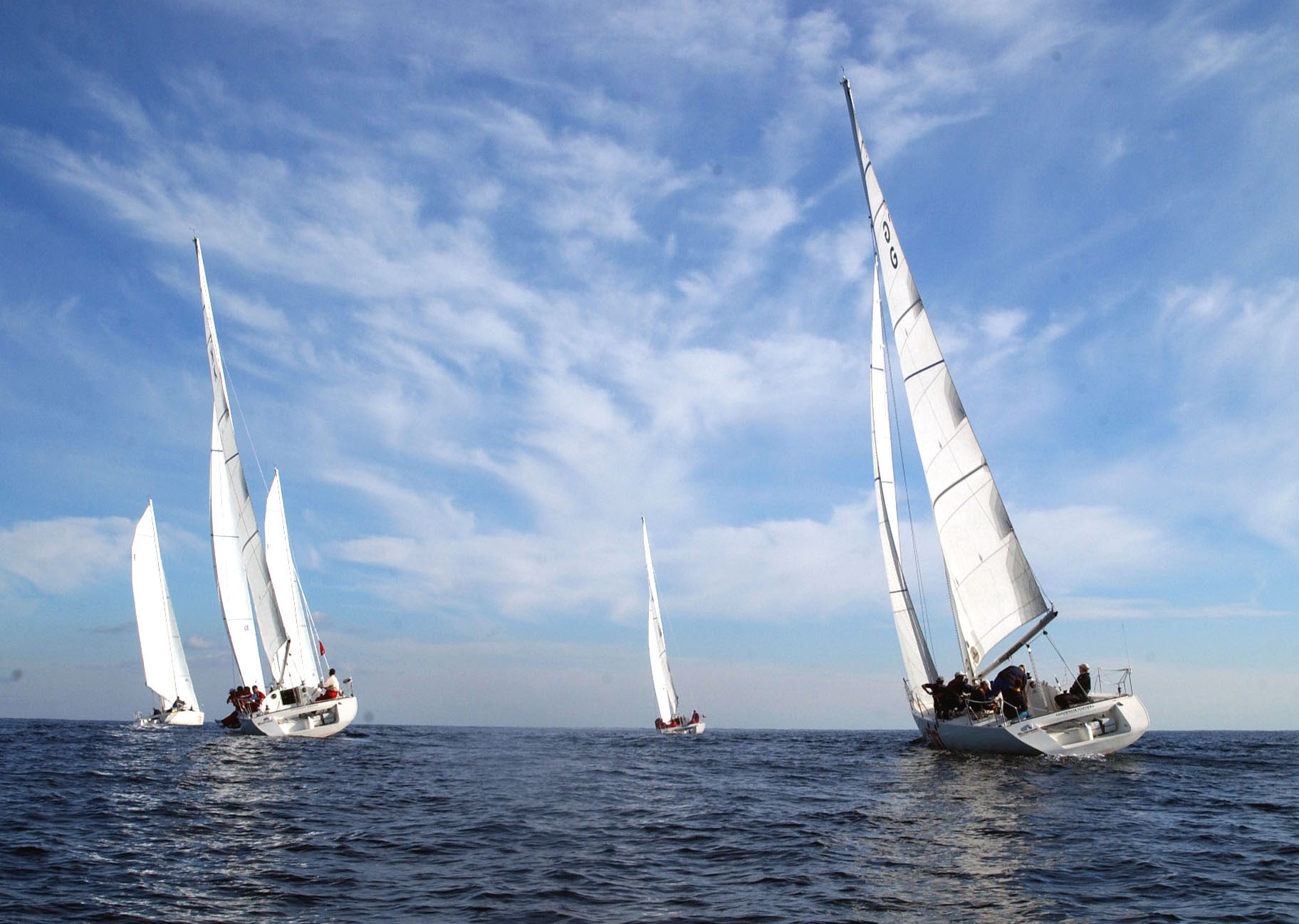
Sailing at the 2003 Military World Games, IMSC at Catania, Italy

CISM annually organises over twenty Military World Championships for different sports in which all member nations can take part. It also organises continental and regional competitions, and every four years holds the Military World Games, a multi-sport event organised in conjunction with CISM member nations. The sports include: basketball, bowling, boxing, cross country running, cycling, football, golf, judo, lifesaving, marathon, modern pentathlon, orienteering, parachuting, rugby football, sailing, shooting, skiing, softball, swimming, taekwondo, track and field, triathlon, volleyball, beach volleyball, and wrestling.

As of March 2025, 26 sports were recognised.

== Other activities ==
=== Symposia ===
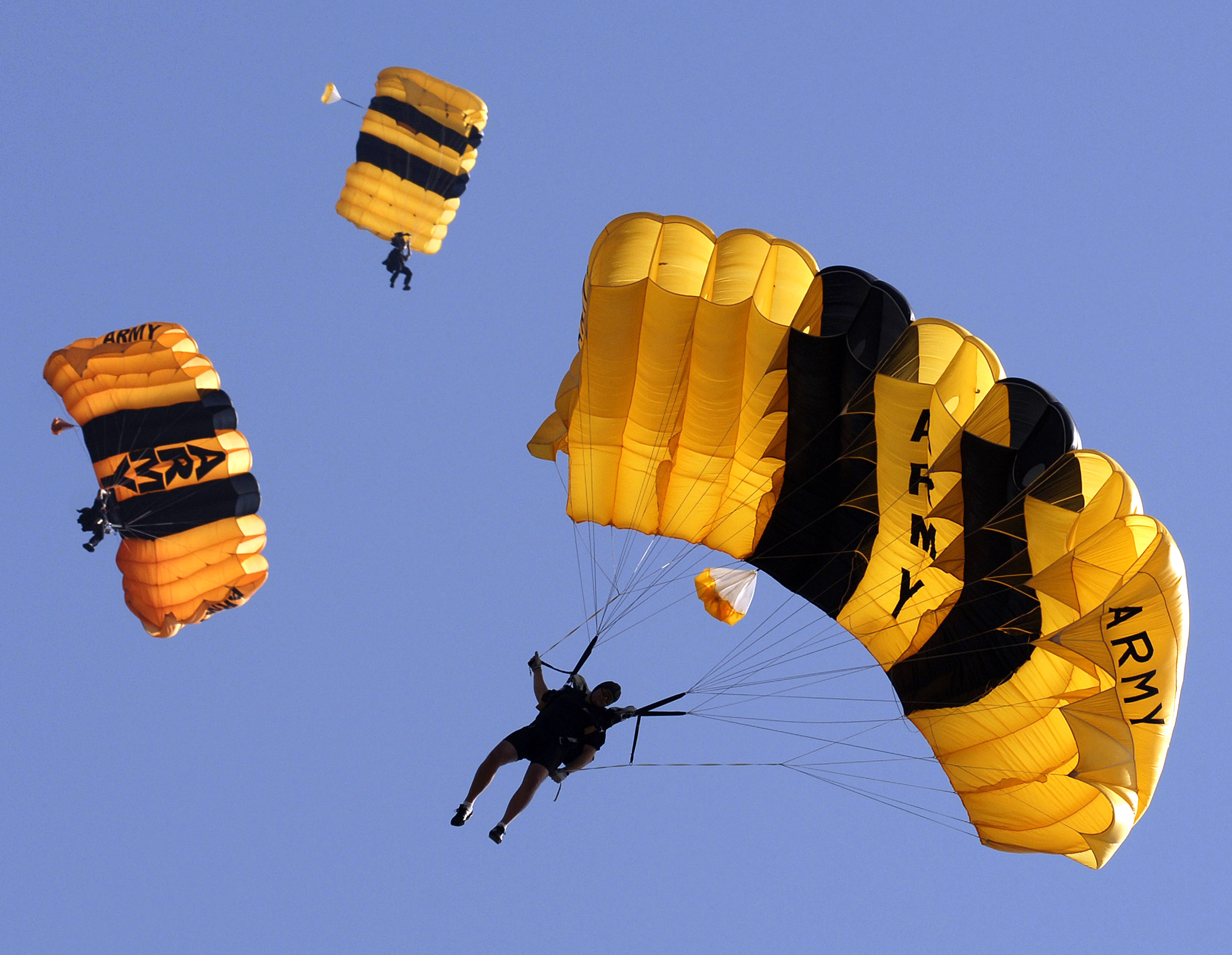
U.S. Army Golden Knights Parachute Team competes in the accuracy competition at the 2007 Military World Games, Hyderabad, India

CISM aims to organise international symposia at least every year to study various aspects of physical education and sport within member states' armed forces. In 2008, the symposium on "How to emphasize the importance of sports within the Armed Forces at national and international level" took place in Sofia, Bulgaria on 24–25 September 2008. A symposium on "Sports science: fundamental tool of modern sports management" in Prague on 18–23 September 2009 was attended by 70 participants from 27 countries, and saw the relaunch of the CISM Academy.

=== Sport for Peace ===
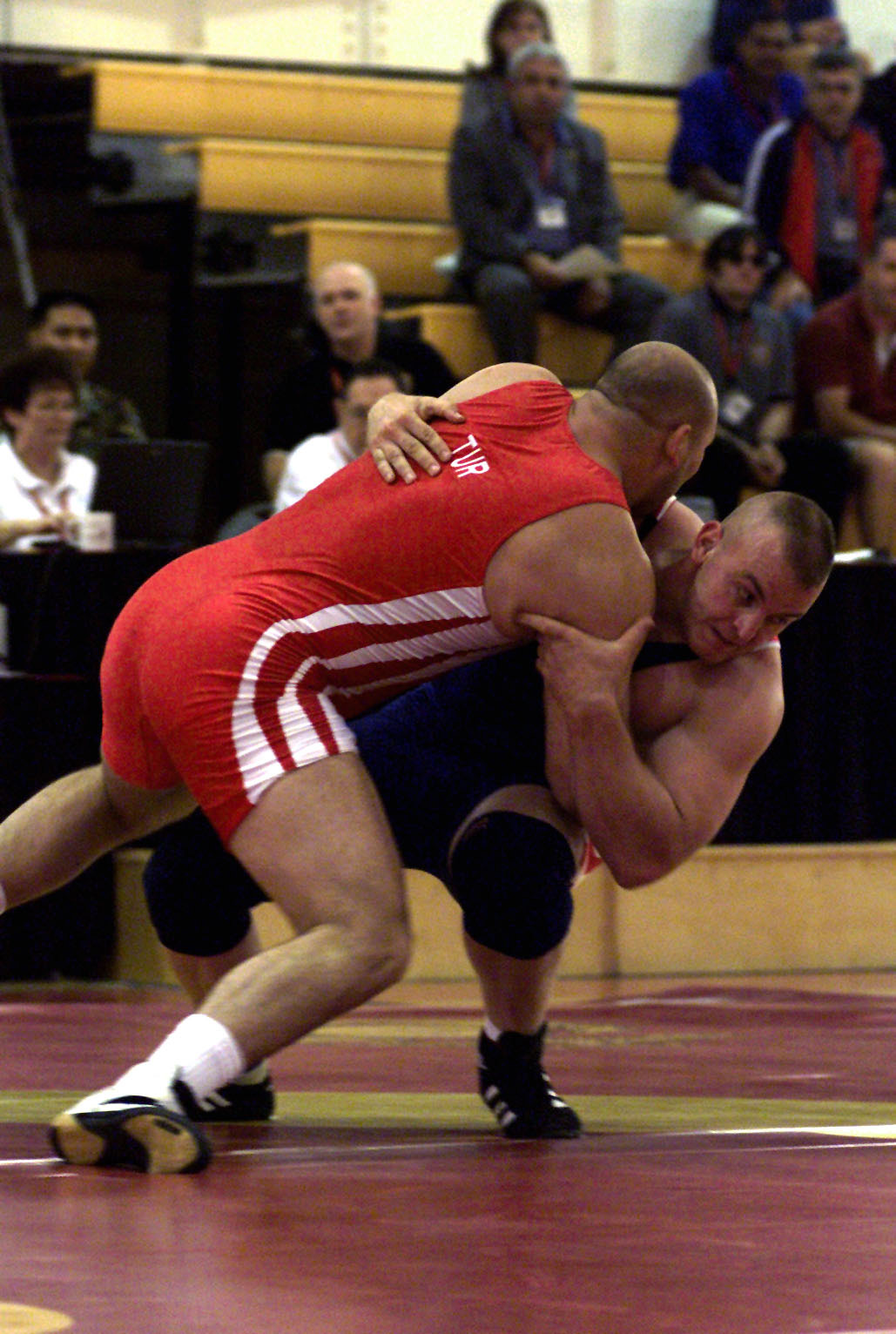
Frank Workman (US), tries to take down Aydın Polatçı (Turkey), 130-kg Free-Style. 19th World Military Wrestling Championship (CISM), Camp Lejeune, North Carolina.

In 2005, CISM organised the seminar "Sport and peace", held in Mantova, Italy. Representatives from more than 22 countries, international organizations, the IOC, the UN, UNICEF, sports associations, CISM member nations and organizations directly dealing with peace, health, sport and education attended the seminar.

In October 2007, during the 4th Military World Games in India, CISM, in partnership with the IOC, the Indian Olympic Association and the Organising Committee of the World Games, organised an International Forum on Sport for Peace, with the theme: "Sport, a concrete fundamental tool to promote Peace".

On 20 March, within the framework of the Winter Games, CISM organized, in close cooperation with the IOC, the International Forum on the subject Sport for Peace – "From positive initiatives to systemic integrated programs".

Forum participants signed a declaration "CISM Aosta Call-to-Action 2010 on Sport for Peace" summarising the common wishes and asking all institutions to formally establish a bilateral and mutual agreement in order to undertake concrete programmes aimed at sharing good practices and effectively implementing Sport for Peace programmes.

=== Women in sport ===
Canada was the first country to include women's categories, when it hosted Taekwondo in 1993. It also had the first female sport committee president (in sailing) and hosted the 1st Women in CISM Week in Kingston in 2008.

== See also ==
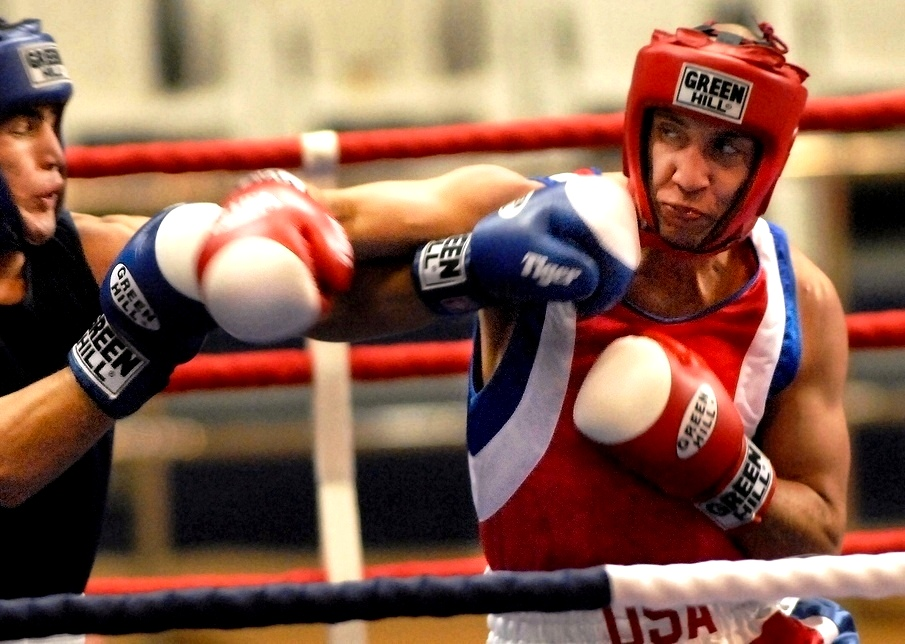
Boyd Melson (right), during the 2007 Conseil International du Sport Militaire Military World Games

- World Military Basketball Championship
- World Military Cross Country Championships
- World Military Cup
- World Military Pentathlon Championship
- World Military Track and Field Championships
- Military World Games
- Military sports
- List of shooting sports organizations
