= Military pentathlon =

Multi-sport event

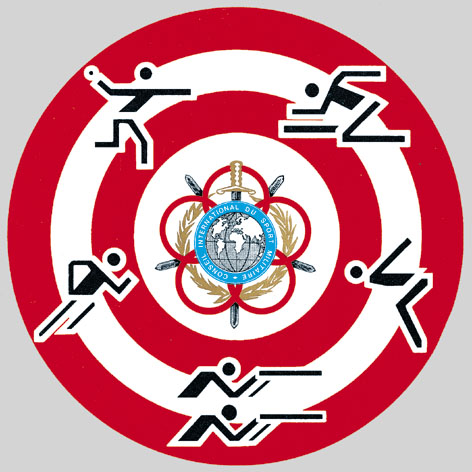
- Highest governing body: Conseil International du Sport Militaire
- First played: French occupation zone, Germany, 1947

Characteristics
- Contact: No
- Mixed-sex: No
- Type: Multisport

Presence
- Country or region: Worldwide
- Olympic: No
- World Games: 1997 (invitational)

The Military Pentathlon is a multisport. It resembles the modern pentathlon but updated to skills used by the modern military.

== History of the military pentathlon ==
The modern pentathlon was originally designed to include the ideal skills of a soldier of the time. By the Second World War, some of those skills (fencing and horse riding) were irrelevant to the modern soldier.

In 1946 a French officer, Captain Henri Debrus (later promoted Colonel and President of the Conseil International du Sport Militaire (CISM)) conceived the idea of organising a sports competition reserved exclusively for the army. It was during discussions held at Frankfurt am Main which led to the setting up of the Allied Forces Sports Council, that his attention was drawn to an original military physical training technique used, at that time, by the Netherlands airborne units. After being dropped over a given zone, parachutists had to travel a distance of twenty kilometres from the dropping point, crossing over a number of obstacles and performing combat operations (small arms fire and grenade throwing).

Captain Debrus took the Dutch method as a guide, eliminated the parachute jump and modified the other tests in order to form a system, which he thought, would constitute an ideal way of ground training. A first trial competition organised by himself was held at the Military Physical Training Centre, at Freiburg, in the French occupation zone in Germany, in August 1947. Only Belgian, Dutch, and French teams took part in the competition.

Since 1950, annual world championships have been held. The sport has grown in popularity, and now over 30 countries participate. The sport's governing body, the International Military Sports Council (CISM), now also organise pentathlons aimed at naval and air force personnel as naval pentathlon and aeronautical pentathlon respectively.

== Events of the military pentathlon ==
- Shooting: At a distance of 200 metres, competitors are tested separately for precision (10 shots in 10 minutes) and rapid-fire (10 shots in one minute) shooting.
- Obstacle running: Competitors navigate a 500-metre obstacle course with 20 obstacles.
- Obstacle swimming: Competitors must swim a distance of 50 metres, including four obstacles.
- Throwing: Competitors are tested separately for precision and distance throwing. In the precision test, competitors throw 16 projectiles (inactive grenades) at targets on the ground at varying distances.
- Cross country running: Competitors undertake an 8 km cross country run.

=== Shooting ===
The shooting discipline consists of sighting shots and competition shooting.

The shooting competition consists of:

- Precision fire: 10 rounds in 10 minutes. If electronic scoring systems are not used, the time available is 12 minutes. After the announcement of "15 seconds remain" the signals "start" and "stop" are given by short whistle blasts. The precision fire is started at the same time for all shooters participating in the same heat.
- Rapid fire: 10 rounds in one minute. The competitors do not get information on the result of their individual shots during the rapid fire series. Therefore, the monitors are turned away or off. The rapid fire is started in two rounds (every second shooter, first the uneven numbers followed by the even numbers) in the same heat. Competitors in the non-shooting round must remain absolutely still.
- Distance is 200m, 300m or 50m.
- Weapons and ammunition: 300m Standard Rifle. All types of ammunition can be used that may be fired without danger to competitors and range personnel. Tracer, armour-piercing and incendiary ammunition are prohibited. Weapons and ammunition must be provided by the team.
- Target: Electronic targets or paper targets may be used. The 300-metre rifle target (according to ISSF General Technical Rules par. 6.3.2.1) will be used. Separate targets will be used for precision and rapid fire.

=== Obstacle run ===
The length of the course is 500 metres and consists of 20 standardised obstacles.

The contest is to be held on one or several lanes, provided that all lanes are identical. Each competitor must follow his own lane.

Obstacles: the obstacles are constructed and placed on the track. Obstacles of men's event consist of:

1. Rope ladder (6m high)
2. Double beam (.95m high, 1.35m high, .65m apart, competitors have to touch the ground between the beams)
3. Trip wire (5 elasticated 'wires' .55m high, 2m apart)
4. Network of wire (wires .45 to .5m high for 20m, to crawl under)
5. Ford (5 stepping stones over 8m)
6. Espalier (3 bar 'fence', 2.2m high, to climb over)
7. Balance beam (1m high, 10.4m long)
8. Sloping wall with rope (3m high)
9. Horizontal beams (over 1.2m, under 0.6m, over 1.2m, under 0.6m, 1.6m apart)
10. Irish table (2m high)
11. Tunnel and twin beams (.5m wide, .5m high, 1.1m long tunnel,
12. Four steps of beams (.75m high, 1.25m high, 1.8m high, 2.3m high and 1.45 m apart)
13. Banquette and pit (1.8m ramp,.5m ditch)
14. Assault wall (1m high)
15. Pit (2m deep)
16. Vertical ladder (4m high)
17. Assault wall II (1.9m high)
18. Zigzag balance beam (15m long, .15m wide, .5m high)
19. Chicane (8m long with two 180 degree turns, covering 24m in total)
20. Three assault walls in succession (1m high, 1.2m high, 1m high, 6m apart)

In the women's event, the rope ladder, sloping wall with rope, four steps of beams and vertical ladder are not negotiated.

=== Obstacle swimming ===
50 metres with four obstacles.

=== Throwing ===
The weight of projectiles is 575 grams (weight tolerance +/- 25 grams) for men and 375 grams (weight tolerance +/- 25 grams) for women.

Throwing consists of precision throwing at distances of 20, 25, 30 and 35 metres (five metres shorter for each target for women). The targets consist of an inner circle with radius of one metre, and an outer circle with radius of two metres. The time allotted for precision throwing is three minutes, 16 projectiles with four inactive grenades on each target.

Distance throwing is also included, where competitors throw three grenades in two minutes. Only the longest throw will count toward the score, which combines points for both distance and precision.

=== Cross-country running ===
The cross-country running is the last event and for men the distance is 8000m and for women the distance is 4000m.

== See also ==
- Military World Games
- Naval pentathlon
- Obstacle course
- World Military Pentathlon Championship
