= Aeronautical pentathlon =

Sporting event at some multi-sport events, such as the Military World Games

Aeronautical pentathlon is a sporting event at some multi-sport events, such as the Military World Games. Despite the name, the sport has six events: shooting, fencing, orienteering, basketball skills, obstacle course and swimming. The idea is to prepare air force officers for evading enemy soldiers. It is generally only participated by military air forces, and its first appearance at the Military World Games was in 2011.

The sports are said to represent various aspects of flying, such as shooting and basketball for hand-eye coordination and fencing for combat. There is also a flying contest included where the competitors serve as navigators, but it is not scored. During the 1950s there were flying events in military aircraft included, such as precision navigation requiring the finish line to be crossed at an exact time.

The sport was begun in 1948 and there are Military Aeronautical Pentathlon World Championships. Sweden has won the most titles.
