= Military World Games =

Multi-sport event for military sportspeople

- Purpose: Military multi-sport event for nations of the world
- Frequency: Every 4 Years
- Inaugurated: 1995 Rome
- Most recent: 2025 Lucerne
- Next event: 2027 Charlotte
- Organization: CISM

The Military World Games is a multi-sport event for military sportspeople, organized by the International Military Sports Council (CISM). They have been held since 1995, although championships for separate sports had been held longer. The first winter edition of the games was held in March of 2010 in the Italian region of Aosta Valley.

== Sports ==
=== Summer Games ===
- Archery
- Artistic gymnastics
- Athletics
- Badminton
- Basketball
- Beach volleyball
- Boxing
- Cycling
- Diving
- Equestrian
- Fencing
- Football
- Golf
- Handball (details)
- Judo
- Modern pentathlon
- Open water swimming
- Orienteering
- Parachuting
- Sailing
- Shooting
- Swimming
- Table tennis
- Taekwondo
- Tennis
- Triathlon
- Volleyball
- Wrestling

Military sports

- Aeronautical pentathlon ()
- Military pentathlon ()
- Naval pentathlon ()

=== Winter Games ===
- Alpine skiing
- Biathlon
- Cross-country skiing
- Military patrol
- Short track speed skating
- Ski mountaineering
- Ski-orienteering
- Sport climbing

== Editions ==
=== Summer Games ===
Host cities of the Military Games

Year	Games	Host	Opened by	Dates	Nations	Competitors			Sports	Events	Medal table
Year	Games	Host	Opened by	Dates	Nations	Men	Women	Total	Sports	Events	Medal table
1995	1	(Italy) Rome	Oscar Luigi Scalfaro	September 4 – 16	93			4017	17	179	Russia
1999	2	(Croatia) Zagreb	Franjo Tuđman	August 8 – 17	80			7825	18	199	Russia
2003	3	(Italy) Catania	Carlo Azeglio Ciampi	December 4 – 11	81			3217	11	120	China
2007	4	(India) Hyderabad	Pratibha Patil	October 14 – 21	101			4738	15	157	Russia
2011	5	(Brazil) Rio de Janeiro	Dilma Rousseff	July 15 – 24	113			4017	20	195	Brazil
2015	6	(South Korea) Mungyeong	Park Geun-hye	October 2 – 11	110			8700	24	248	Russia
2019	7	(China) Wuhan	Xi Jinping	October 18 – 27	110			9308	27	316	China
2023	8	(Colombia) Bogotá	Cancelled								
2027	9	(United States) Charlotte	Donald Trump (expected)	June 25 – July 4							

=== Winter Games ===
Host cities of the Military Games

Year	Games	Host	Dates	Nations	Competitors			Sports	Events	Top Country On Medal Table
Year	Games	Host	Dates	Nations	Men	Women	Total	Sports	Events	Top Country On Medal Table
2010	1	(Italy) Aosta Valley	March 20 – 25	43			800	6	28	Italy
2013	2	(France) Annecy	March 24 – 29	40			1000	8	36	France
2017	3	(Russia) Sochi	February 24 – 27	25			402	7	44	Russia
2021	4	(Germany) Berchtesgaden	Cancelled, due to the COVID-19 pandemic							
2025	4	(Switzerland) Lucerne	March 24 – 29	40				10	50	France
2029	5	TBA	TBA	TBA						

=== Cadet Games ===
Year	Games	Host	Dates	Nations	Competitors			Sports	Events	Top Country On Medal Table
Year	Games	Host	Dates	Nations	Men	Women	Total	Sports	Events	Top Country On Medal Table
2010	1	(Turkey) Ankara								
2014	2	(Ecuador) Quito								
2022	3	(Russia) St. Petersburg	August 4–12	20				7		Russia
2024	4	(Venezuela) Caracas	August 16–24	9				10		Russia

== Medals ==
=== Summer Games ===
As of 2019 Military World Games.

Rank	Nation	Gold	Silver	Bronze	Total
1	China (CHN)	324	247	168	739
2	Russia (RUS)	294	227	190	711
3	Brazil (BRA)	102	104	107	313
4	Italy (ITA)	88	94	115	297
5	France (FRA)	51	62	88	201
6	Poland (POL)	49	61	87	197
7	South Korea (KOR)	47	48	57	152
8	Germany (GER)	40	71	80	191
9	North Korea (PRK)	39	34	45	118
10	Ukraine (UKR)	34	63	73	170
11	Kenya (KEN)	27	26	25	78
12	United States (USA)	21	30	30	81
13	Belarus (BLR)	18	25	58	101
14	Bahrain (BHR)	17	5	15	37
15	Slovenia (SLO)	15	17	22	54
16	Iran (IRI)	14	22	27	63
17	Turkey (TUR)	14	10	16	40
18	Norway (NOR)	13	21	15	49
19	Croatia (CRO)	13	12	21	46
20	Uzbekistan (UZB)	13	9	12	34
21	Romania (ROM)	11	23	29	63
22	Austria (AUT)	10	15	21	46
23	Morocco (MAR)	10	11	11	32
24	Kazakhstan (KAZ)	10	9	23	42
25	Belgium (BEL)	10	5	13	28
26	Qatar (QAT)	9	11	10	30
27	Latvia (LAT)	9	7	9	25
28	Brunei (BRN)	9	6	11	26
29	Egypt (EGY)	8	8	14	30
30	Switzerland (SUI)	8	7	20	35
31	Saudi Arabia (KSA)	8	6	5	19
32	Algeria (ALG)	7	9	17	33
33	Slovakia (SVK)	7	7	10	24
34	Netherlands (NED)	7	4	9	20
35	Sweden (SWE)	7	2	9	18
36	Czech Republic (CZE)	6	10	10	26
37	Tunisia (TUN)	6	4	6	16
38	Finland (FIN)	5	18	12	35
39	Azerbaijan (AZE)	5	12	22	39
40	Greece (GRE)	4	20	11	35
41	Mongolia (MGL)	4	7	11	22
42	Estonia (EST)	4	4	6	14
43	Hungary (HUN)	3	10	6	19
44	India (IND)	3	4	19	26
45	Lithuania (LTU)	3	4	16	23
46	Bulgaria (BUL)	3	3	6	12
47	Canada (CAN)	3	1	10	14
48	Ecuador (ECU)	3	1	0	4
49	Chile (CHI)	2	4	2	8
49	Syria (SYR)	2	4	2	8
51	Sri Lanka (SRI)	2	2	8	12
52	Ireland (IRL)	2	1	4	7
53	Venezuela (VEN)	1	4	10	15
54	Vietnam (VIE)	1	2	3	6
55	Oman (OMA)	1	2	2	5
56	Tanzania (TAN)	1	2	0	3
57	Armenia (ARM)	1	1	5	7
58	Denmark (DEN)	1	1	3	5
59	Namibia (NAM)	1	1	2	4
59	Sudan (SUD)	1	1	2	4
61	Uganda (UGA)	1	0	2	3
61	United Arab Emirates (UAE)	1	0	2	3
63	Serbia and Montenegro (SCG)	1	0	1	2
64	Gabon (GAB)	1	0	0	1
64	Senegal (SEN)	1	0	0	1
66	Thailand (THA)	0	5	10	15
67	Dominican Republic (DOM)	0	4	7	11
68	Lesotho (LES)	0	3	1	4
69	Cyprus (CYP)	0	2	2	4
70	Cameroon (CMR)	0	1	4	5
71	Indonesia (INA)	0	1	3	4
72	Georgia (GEO)	0	1	2	3
72	Jordan (JOR)	0	1	2	3
74	Luxembourg (LUX)	0	1	1	2
74	Rwanda (RWA)	0	1	1	2
76	Monaco (MON)	0	1	0	1
77	Barbados (BAR)	0	0	3	3
77	Serbia (SRB)	0	0	3	3
77	South Africa (RSA)	0	0	3	3
77	Spain (ESP)	0	0	3	3
81	Botswana (BOT)	0	0	2	2
81	Kuwait (KUW)	0	0	2	2
81	Pakistan (PAK)	0	0	2	2
81	Uruguay (URU)	0	0	2	2
85	Afghanistan (AFG)	0	0	1	1
85	Albania (ALB)	0	0	1	1
85	Argentina (ARG)	0	0	1	1
85	Colombia (COL)	0	0	1	1
85	Ivory Coast (CIV)	0	0	1	1
85	Jamaica (JAM)	0	0	1	1
85	Portugal (POR)	0	0	1	1
85	Suriname (SUR)	0	0	1	1
Totals (92 entries)		1,436	1,462	1,706	4,604

=== Winter Games ===
As of 2017 Winter Military World Games.

Rank	Nation	Gold	Silver	Bronze	Total
1	Russia (RUS)	29	16	14	59
2	Italy (ITA)	25	19	18	62
3	France (FRA)	24	21	20	65
4	China (CHN)	6	11	8	25
5	Austria (AUT)	6	11	6	23
6	Switzerland (SUI)	5	6	5	16
7	Slovenia (SLO)	4	4	5	13
8	Norway (NOR)	2	5	2	9
9	Germany (GER)	2	3	7	12
10	Poland (POL)	2	0	1	3
11	South Korea (KOR)	2	0	0	2
12	Bulgaria (BUL)	1	4	2	7
13	Estonia (EST)	1	1	0	2
14	Spain (ESP)	1	0	2	3
15	Finland (FIN)	0	1	5	6
16	Kazakhstan (KAZ)	0	1	4	5
17	Romania (ROM)	0	1	1	2
18	Belarus (BLR)	0	1	0	1
19	Czech Republic (CZE)	0	0	1	1
19	Iran (IRN)	0	0	1	1
19	Lithuania (LTU)	0	0	1	1
19	Serbia (SRB)	0	0	1	1
19	Sweden (SWE)	0	0	1	1
Totals (23 entries)		110	105	105	320

== See also ==
- International Army Games
- World Military Championships
- World Military Cup
- African Military Games
- Invictus Games
- Military pentathlon
- World Police and Fire Games
