= Hiroko Maruyama =

Japanese voice actress (born 1946)

- 丸山 裕子
- Born: October 22, 1946 (age 79)
- Occupations: Actress; voice actress
- Years active: 1969–present
- Agent: Theater Echo
- Notable work: First Human Giatrus as Gon; Ojamanga Yamada-kun as Minoru Yamada; Ninja Hattori-kun as Togejirou; Captain Tsubasa as Ryo Ishizaki; Robotan as Robotan

Hiroko Maruyama (丸山 裕子, Maruyama Hiroko; born October 22, 1946) is a Japanese voice actress from Tokyo, affiliated with Teatro Echo. She is known for portraying Gon in First Human Giatrus, Kinoppy in Paul's Miraculous Adventure, Santa Minami in Chōgattai Majutsu Robo Ginguiser, Minoru Yamada in Ojamanga Yamada-kun, Togejirou in Ninja Hattori-kun, Prince Komaro in Yattodetaman, Ryo Ishizaki in Captain Tsubasa, Mag in Choushinsei Flashman, and Robotan in Robotan.

== Biography ==
Hiroko Maruyama, a native of Tokyo, was born on October 22, 1946, and was educated at Ōmori High School. After spending one year at Toho School of Performing Arts, she joined Theater Echo in 1966.

In 1972, she voiced U-ko in Shin Obake no Q-Tarō. In 1974, she voiced Gon in First Human Giatrus. In 1976, she voiced Kinoppy in Paul's Miraculous Adventure. In 1977, she voiced Santa Minami in Chōgattai Majutsu Robo Ginguiser. In 1980, she voiced Minoru Yamada in Ojamanga Yamada-kun. In 1981, she voiced Prince Komaro in Yattodetaman. The same year, she voiced Togejirou in Ninja Hattori-kun, reprising her role in the films ESP Wars and Ninja Beast Jippō vs. Miracle Egg. In 1983, she voiced Ryo Ishizaki in Captain Tsubasa, later reprising the role in the 1994 video game of the same name. In 1986, she voiced the titular character of Robotan.

Other anime she appeared in include Brave Raideen, Galaxy Express 999, Ashita no Joe, Urusei Yatsura, Pastel Yumi, the Magic Idol, Ranma ½, Moomin, The Brave of Sun Fighbird, The Brave Express Might Gaine, DNA², Shadow Skill: Eigi, Silent Möbius, and Power Stone. She also had voice acting roles in the Hayao Miyazaki films My Neighbor Totoro (1988) and Kiki's Delivery Service (1989). Although her voice acting career gradually declined by then, she still had voice acting roles throughout the 2000s and 2010s, including Koharu Midō in Tsukuyomi: Moon Phase, Mamō in And Yet the Town Moves, Tamura-san in Ground Control to Psychoelectric Girl.

In 1983, she portrayed Otsune in the drama Oshin. In tokusatsu, she voiced the titular character of Pettonton and Mag in Choushinsei Flashman.

She is skilled in nagauta and is the widow of late actor Eken Mine.

== Filmography ==
=== Anime television ===
1969

- Himitsu no Akko-chan, Chikako

1970

- Inakappe Taishō, Tonko Tonmaruki
- Mahō no Mako-chan, Tarō
- Nekojara-shi no 11-ri, Sugomi

1971

- Andersen Monogatari, duckling
- Genshi Shōnen Ryū, Don
- Marvelous Melmo, Komori
- Shin Obake no Q-Tarō, U-ko

1972

- Pinocchio: The Series, Mock
- Seigi wo Ai Suru Mono: Gekkō Kamen, Shigeru

1973

- Karate Master, Mitsuru's mother

1974

- First Human Giatrus, Gon
- Heidi, Girl of the Alps, Peter
- Hoshi no Ko Chobin, Kero
- New Honeybee Hutch, Abacchi
- The Song of Tentomushi, Isshū Tsuchimaru

1975

- Brave Raideen, Tobi Shun
- Laura, the Prairie Girl, Jimmy
- Maya the Honey Bee, Semi

1976

- Dokaben, Natsuko Natsukawa
- Gowappa 5 Gōdam, Jirō
- Paul's Miraculous Adventure, Kinoppy

1977

- Chōgattai Majutsu Robo Ginguiser, Santa Minami
- Formula 1, Hiroshi Arashi

1978

- The Adventures of the Little Prince, Claude
- Galaxy Express 999, Chibi, Nikolai

1979

- Bannertail: The Story of Gray Squirrel, aunt Rory
- Jeanie with the Light Brown Hair, Billy
- Misha the Little Bear, Ahō-tori, Ahō-tori's mother, Joey's mother
- Doraemon, Nobita Nobi (stand-in for Noriko Ohara in July 1979)

1980

- Ashita no Joe, Tonkichi
- Ojamanga Yamada-kun, Minoru Yamada

1981

- Ai no Gakko Cuore Monogatari, Garlone
- Belle and Sebastian, Francisco
- Ninja Hattori-kun, Togejirou
- Urusei Yatsura, Cupid, Natsuko
- Yattodetaman, Prince Komaro/Doremifa Otama

1982

- Scientific Rescue Team Technoboyger, Pol

1983

- Captain Tsubasa, Ryo Ishizaki
- Mrs. Pepper Pot, Kyapa

1984

- Ashita Tenki ni Naare, mother

1985

- Princess Sara, flower shop lady

1986

- Pastel Yumi, the Magic Idol, Mrs. Fukurokouji
- Robotan, Robotan
- Uchūsen Sagittarius, Diana, Granny Ashoka

1988

- F, Tamotsu's mother
- Mashin Hero Wataru, Yōbe Obaba, midwife
- Meimon! Daisan-Yakyūbu, Tetsurō

1989

- Ranma ½, elderly woman

1990

- Magical Angel Sweet Mint, Aunt Herb
- Moomin, Stinky

1991

- The Brave of Sun Fighbird, elder
- Holly the Ghost, Micron
- Marude Dameo, subordinate

1992

- Cooking Papa, Mitsugu Miura
- Flower Witch Mary Bell, Bababel
- Thumbelina: A Magical Story, mother chameleon

1993

- The Brave Express Might Gaine, wizard

1994

- DNA², Chiyo Monou

1997

- Cho Mashin Hero Wataru, Yōbe Obaba

1998

- Shadow Skill: Eigi, Bā-san
- Silent Möbius, aunt at the store

1999

- Jibaku-kun, Silva
- Power Stone, Garna

2001

- Great Dangaioh, elderly woman

2004

- Tsukuyomi: Moon Phase, Koharu Midō

2010

- And Yet the Town Moves, Mamō

2011

- Ground Control to Psychoelectric Girl, Tamura-san

=== Live-action television ===
1980

- Baku-san no Kaban, Beaver

1983

- Oshin, Otsune
- Pettonton, Pettonton (voice)

1986

- Choushinsei Flashman, Mag (voice)

=== Animated film ===
- Panda! Go, Panda! (1972), Nana
- Panda! Go, Panda! and the Rainy-Day Circus (1973), Pan
- Yaemon, the Locomotive (1974), Tintin
- The Adventures of Manxmouse (1979), mother frog
- 11 Piki no Neko (1980), Neko
- 21 Emon: Uchū e Irasshai! (1981), Onabe
- Tsushima Maru: Sayonara Okinawa (1982), Kenji
- Two Down Full Base (1982), Shin'ichi Morita
- Zō no Inai Dōbutsuen (1982), Tomo
- Urusei Yatsura: Only You (1983), Rose
- Ninja Hattori-kun + Perman: ESP Wars (1984), Togejirou
- Ninja Hattori-kun + Perman: Ninja Beast Jippō vs. Miracle Egg (1985), Togejirou
- 11 Piki no Neko to Ahōdori (1986), Neko
- GeGeGe no Kitarō: The Strongest Yokai Army!! Disembark for Japan! (1986), sneezing spirit
- Super Mario Bros.: The Great Mission to Rescue Princess Peach! (1986), Goomba
- Murasaki Shikibu: Genji Monogatari (1987), Ōtakebe
- The Story of Fifteen Boys (1987), Moko
- My Neighbor Totoro (1988), Kanta's mother
- Kiki's Delivery Service (1989), woman, Tombo's friend
- Kim's Cross (1990), Tesu
- Ōkī Ichinensei to Chīsana Ninensei (2014), farmhouse lady

=== OVA ===
- Watt Poe and Our Story (1988), Gorin
- Sakura Wars: The Radiant Gorgeous Blooming Cherry Blossoms (1999), grandmother

=== Video games ===
- Mamono Hunter Yōko: Makai kara no Tenkōsei (1992), Zeluda
- Mamono Hunter Yōko: Tooki Yobigoe (1993), Zeluda
- Captain Tsubasa (1994), Ryo Ishizaki

=== Audio ===
- Audio Drama Meisakusen: Takarajima (2003), mother
