= Pinocchio: The Series =

1972 Japanese anime TV series

- Screenshot from the TV series Pinocchio: The Series, displaying Geppetto and Pinocchio
- 樫の木モック
- Developed by: Jinzo Toriumi
- Directed by: Ippei Kuri (episodes 1-14); Seitaro Hara (episodes 15-52)
- Music by: Nobuyoshi Koshibe
- Opening theme: "Kashi no ki Mokku" by Kumiko Kaori
- Country of origin: Japan
- Original language: Japanese
- No. of episodes: 52

Production
- Executive producer: Tatsuo Yoshida
- Producers: Kenji Yoshida; Motoyoshi Maesato
- Production company: Tatsunoko Production

Original release
- Network: FNS (Fuji TV)
- Release: 4 January – 26 December 1972

Pinocchio: The Series, also known as Saban's The Adventures of Pinocchio and known as Mock of the Oak Tree (樫の木モック, Kashi no Ki Mokku) in Japan, is a 52-episode anime series by Tatsunoko Production first aired on Fuji Television in 1972, which was edited by Saban in 1990. The story is loosely based on the 1883 novel The Adventures of Pinocchio by Italian author Carlo Collodi.

Unlike the lighter, more cheerful tones of most adaptations such as Walt Disney's film adaptation and Nippon Animation's version Piccolino no Bōken, this series has a distinctly darker, more sadistic tone in the veins of Collodi's novel, and portrays the main character, Pinocchio (Mock) in his personality from the novel, as a badly behaved troublemaker who only learns his lesson by suffering from constant physical and psychological abuse and freak accidents.

== Setting ==
This version tells a story of an extremely gullible, naive and morally confused wooden doll/marionette brought to life by a mystical Fairy with Turquoise Hair. Pinocchio (Mock) is characterized as having many character faults which he must learn to overcome in order to be worthy of being granted humanity. Some of these character faults include selfishness, sarcasm, insensitivity, indolence, obstinacy, dupability, self-pity, over-trusting, gullibility, stupidity, disobedience, compulsive lying, arrogance, greed, cowardice, recklessness, pettiness, cruelty, foolishness and an inability to learn from mistakes. For example, during the fifth episode, "What is a Heart", Pinocchio actually resorts to committing attempted murder to acquire a child's heart because he thinks it will help him become a real boy.

Throughout the entire series Pinocchio (Mock), partly due to his own delinquency and repetitive disobedience, must undergo other costly ordeals of hardship and pain in which he is continuously tormented. In the tenth episode, "When my nose gets longer", Pinocchio is forcefully adopted by a Nobleman and becomes a Prince, whereupon he becomes so corrupted with wealth and privileges that he becomes extremely cruel to his servants and charges about his adopted father's estates on horseback, randomly riding down any person who gets in his way, whilst laughing at the terror, indignity and danger inflicted upon others for his personal amusement. Pinocchio is of course severely punished by the blue fairy for these acts of utter selfishness who makes his nose turn into a small tree. Pinocchio is consequently disowned and cast out naked into the wilderness by his adopted father who can not stop laughing at him as he is dragged away crying out in vain for mercy. The episode ends with a forlorn Pinocchio weeping as he fumbles through the castle's surrounding undergrowth, naked and cold because his ex-adopted father has taken away his expensive attire. There are clearly illustrated scratches etched into the wood of his body from the surrounding vegetation. The subsequent episode sees Pinocchio transform into a small tree with a face and with roots fixed deep into the soil so that he can no longer move. He is eventually found by a wood cutter who chops him down and sells him as a novelty singing tree.

The cultural backdrop of these episodes seem to suggest an alpine region during the mid to late 19th century, only with an added mythical theme which includes creatures such as vampires, fairies, witches, dragons, demons and mermaids as well as talking animals and not to mention of course a living puppet. Such backdrops indicates 19th century areas in Catholic Europe such as Austro-Hungarian Monarchy, Swiss Confederacy, early Kingdom of Italy or even the Papal States. But most indicate the story is set in the Alps regions of Northern Italy.

== Plot overview ==
The story begins with an oak tree losing a branch in a storm, which is found by an elderly, childless, woodcarver who carves it into a marionette child to keep him company and names him Pinocchio (Mokku in the Japanese version, derived from the Japanese word "Moku" meaning wood). That night the fairy of the oak tree grants Geppetto's wish by giving Pinocchio life, though she'll only be able to give him humanity once he has earned it. From there Pinocchio goes on a number of adventures in both his village and the surrounding area, typically involving him either ignoring Cricket's advice and getting in trouble as a result or trying to do something good and somebody else (usually a talking animal or one of his classmates, particularly Franko) taking advantage of his naivete. However, with the help of Cricket, the Oak Fairy, and his father, he's always able to escape whatever situation he finds himself in, either through direct help or figuring out a solution based on advice he's given, and returns home having learnt an important lesson about life and what it means to be human.

The focus of the story shifts at the end of episode 29 where, after helping to defend his village from bandits, Pinocchio encounters Sneeroff who captures him and later picks up Jack the Fox and Willie the Weasel to tour with him as entertainers. Geppetto heads out in search of him with Charlie the Mouse in tow, though they keep missing each other, and Sneeroff takes the group to Africa to search for diamonds after speaking to a man who made his fortune this way. However the ship they are traveling on is destroyed during a storm and they end up in the wrong part of Africa with Jack and Willie's fates left unknown; from there Pinocchio journeys in search of his father though he often just misses him or has the reunion cut short, during his search he has to rely on his own abilities more than in the past in order to get past the various problems he encounters on his journeys, including Sneeroff. Eventually Pinocchio is able to return to Central Europe where he reunites with Jack and Willie, who become his friends when he helps to free them and a number of other animals from Sneeroff and get the puppeteer arrested for his misdeeds.

Unfortunately when Pinocchio returns to his house he finds that Geppetto has left again to search for him and heads out in search of his father, however, a war is about to break out and a large cedar forest is going to be cleared to make war ships. The trees ask Pinocchio to speak on their behalf as he is half-tree, though nobody listens to him, he is able to put a plan in motion to scare away the soldiers; unfortunately this results in the army branding him as a product of dark magic and putting a bounty on his head, as well as arresting Geppetto and preparing to send him to the inhospitable "Devil's Island". Thus the puppet heads out again, aided by Jack, Willie and Charlie, to try to rescue his father before he can be sent to the island while avoiding both the authorities and those who want to turn him over for the bounty. Eventually all five of them end up on a ship bound for the island where Pinocchio meets Gina, a girl who was brought as a sacrifice for the monster guarding the island, though when the monster appears Pinocchio fights and defeats it with the help of the Oak Fairy.

In the aftermath of the shipwreck Pinocchio, Gina and Geppetto are stranded on Devil's Island where they manage to survive for a time with the two children bonding and vowing to be each other's sibling as they care for Geppetto and magically transform the island into a paradise in the process. The three are then rescued by their animal friends and return to Europe shortly before Christmas, however, Gina suddenly falls ill and while he searches for a way to purchase the medicine needed to save her Pinocchio learns that a number of other children have the same illness but the medicine needed to cure them is too expensive and goes to search for the herb needed to cure them instead. While he succeeds in finding the herb and curing the sick children, he is still believed to be the product of sorcery by the army who catches up to and shoots him. Fortunately, the Oak Fairy is able to save him by scaring away the army and transforming the boy into a fully human child, though this means she will no longer be able to appear to him. At the same time, a great light surrounds the sky and the perverse Colonel and his soldiers fall to the ground in fear. The light turns out to be the Fairy Godmother, who, proud of Pinocchio's courage and kindness, brings him back to life as a real boy. Pinocchio takes leave of the Fairy and the story ends with Pinocchio, Geppetto and all his friends contemplating the sky on Christmas night.

== Crew ==
- Executive Producer/Planning: Tatsuo Yoshida
- Producer: Kenji Yoshida, Motoyoshi Maesato
- Chief Writer: Jinzo Toriumi
- Series Director: Seitaro Hara
- Music: Nobuyoshi Koshibe
- Character Design: Yoshitaka Amano
- Chief Animation Directors: Masayuki Hayashi, Sadao Miyamoto

== Cast & Crew ==
Voice actors

- Pinocchio Voiced by: Hiroko Maruyama (Japanese); Thor Bishopric (English)
- Geppetto Voiced by: Minoru Yada (Japanese); Walter Massey (English)
- Puppetmaster Sneeroff Voiced by: A.J. Henderson
- Dr. Sorrow Voiced by: Arthur Grosser
- Jack Voiced by: Dean Hagopian
- Willie Voiced by: Junpei Takiguchi (Japanese); Terrence Scammell (English)
- Charlie Voiced by: Kazuya Tatekabe (Japanese); Arthur Holden (English)
- Cricket Voiced by: Rick Jones
- The Blue Fairy Voiced by: Jane Woods
- Narrator Voiced by: Ian Finlay

Crew

- Music by: Haim Saban & Shuki Levy
- Music orchestrated by: Steve Marston

== Episodes ==
No.	Title	Original release date
1	"The Puppet is Alive!" "Booku wa Kanashī Ki no Ningyō" (ぼくは悲しい木の人形 (I'm A Sad Wooden Puppet))	4 January 1972
An Oak tree loses one of its branches during a storm, which is found by an elderly woodcarver named Geppetto who carves it into a marionette, made in the image of the child he always wanted, and names the puppet Pinocchio. Later that night the fairy guardian of the tree appears in Geppetto's workshop and gives Pinocchio life (though she cannot make him human until he has earned it), much to the delight of the woodcarver who buys Pinocchio clothing and school books the next morning as well as arranging a birthday party for the puppet (during which it is revealed that Pinocchio has no sense of smell and cannot feel pain). The next day Pinocchio is sent to school, but is tempted skip classes to see a traveling puppet show by his schoolmate Franko and, against the advice of the ghost of the Cricket who lived in the branch he was carved from (the Cricket's accidental death is removed from the English dub), goes to sell his book for a ticket, only to be sold to the puppeteer by Franko.
2	"I Don't Want to be a Puppet" "Ningyō Nante Mō Iyada" (人形なんてもういやだ (I Don't want To Be A Puppet Anymore))	11 January 1972
Following the events of the first episode, the puppeteer Sneeroff forces Pinocchio to perform in his puppet show without pay and under constant fear of being burnt as the worn out puppets are, which the other puppets explain is the way humans typically treat them. After the Cricket appears to him Pinocchio resolves to work hard to earn the money to repay his father for his clothes and books, but Sneeroff initially refuses to pay him as Cricket predicted, only to seemingly change his mind. However, when Pinocchio goes to collect his share of the money so he can return home Sneeroff admits he had no intention of paying him or letting him go and threatens to burn him. After this the puppet feels increasingly hopeless until he sees Sneeroff has fallen asleep at the table, giving him a chance to take the key from his pocket and escape, though Pinocchio refuses to leave without getting the money to repay his father and rescuing the other puppets. Unfortunately his plan is complicated when one of the puppets catches on a table, waking Sneeroff, who chases Pinocchio until the other puppets sacrifice themselves by tangling Sneeroff's legs; although even that is not enough to prevent him from catching Pinocchio he manages to escape when the ice they were standing on breaks. After escaping Pinocchio is still sad that he won't be able to buy a coat for his father and about his treatment as a puppet and wishes he could be human, the Oak Fairy then appears and tells him that he can become a human if he learns to be honest and compassionate, but first he should return home. Pinocchio and his father share a tearful reunion and the next day the young puppet heads out for school, though is slightly distracted by a girl mentioning that she plans to go somewhere fun.
3	"Mind Your Father!" "Onegai, Boku o Shinjite" (お願い、ぼくを信じて (Please, Trust Me))	18 January 1972
Spring is beginning and Geppetto warns Pinocchio not to go near the river during this time as there's a greater risk of him falling in the river and being swept over the waterfall, meanwhile Charlie the mouse is becoming jealous of the attention Pinocchio is getting. The Cricket appears to Pinocchio and tells him that he's promised to help keep him on the strait and narrow, though the puppet has no interest in his advice; later when he's praised again for the good marks he got at school Charlie resolves to be rid of him. The next day Charlie goes to see Jack the Fox and Willie the Weasel and entices them with the promise of the deviled egg sandwiches he knows are going to be packed in Pinocchio's lunch that day before suggesting they lure the puppet to the river and push him in to get the lunch package away from him, though Jack and Willie initially think Charlie's suggestion is a bit drastic they eventually agree. When Pinocchio shows up the three animals lure him away to the river claiming that they're going to watch the spring mole wrestling tournament, despite the efforts of Cricket to keep him on the path to school, and once they arrive there Jack takes his lunch box and Charlie pushes him in the river. Pinocchio manages to save himself from going over the waterfall with the help of Cricket and the Oak fairy and makes his way home, but ends up collapsing from exhaustion, Geppetto soon finds him and takes him home to treat his fever; meanwhile Charlie begins to worry about his plan being found out when Pinocchio wakes up, when Geppetto leaves to gather medicinal herbs the mouse attempts to cut the puppet's head off, only for his attempts to be thwarted by Cricket. Unfortunately he eventually manages to throw Cricket out of the way and decides to bite through the puppet's neck.
4	"Who Can I Trust?" "Ningyō datte Yūki ga Arunda" (人形だって勇気があるんだ (Even A Puppet Can Have Courage))	25 January 1972
Charlie's last attempt to kill Pinocchio is thwarted when he moves out of the way and begins to wake up, unable to remember the events of the past few days. A few days later he's fully recovered and able to return to school, though as he's getting ready Tommy the bird shows up and tells him and Geppetto that his and Tilly's eggs have hatched and promises to introduce them to the chicks soon. Meanwhile, Charlie is still jealous of Pinocchio and conspires with Jack and Willie, who are already planning to steal the puppet's lunch, when Cricket prevents him from being tricked out of it the three animals simply steal it and Pinocchio chases after them, falling into a ravine in the process. After waking up he begins to make his way home and runs into Charlie who claims that everything he did the past few days were a misunderstanding and tells him that he should dry off in a nearby cabin before returning home, while there they hear chicks from what turns out to be Tommy and Tilly's nest and while Pinocchio goes to see it in the rafters Charlie pushes the ladder away and sets the cabin on fire with the help of Jack and Willie (though Charlie begins to have second thoughts about the plan). While attempting to escape the burning cabin Pinocchio finds Tommy and Tilly, who ask him to help save their chicks, who are too small to fly, and the group manages to escape the cabin before it collapses, though Pinocchio loses a foot in the process; meanwhile several adults from town have noticed the blaze and show up, assuming the puppet caused the fire. Fortunately Geppetto intervenes and persuades the crowd to let him off with a warning, once they're alone Geppetto admonishes his son for skipping school but quickly forgives him and carries him home to repair his foot.
5	"What is a Heart?" "Ningen wa Nante Subarashī!" (人間はなんてすばらしい! (Humans Are Really Amazing!))	1 February 1972
Pinocchio meets Johnny, a boy in his class who is under pressure from both his parents who have different plans for him: his mother wishes for him to study to become a doctor, while his father wants him to take over the family business and become a chimneysweep. Johnny himself feels he can achieve neither of these things and wants to choose his own path, though he has no idea what he wants from life and envies Pinocchio not having to face any of the pressures he does. Meanwhile, a stray cat named Nora convinces Pinocchio that he can become human if he acquires a human heart and after overhearing Johnny talking about how much he hates his life is convinced that he should take Johnny's, not understanding the implications of doing to or that Nora has a vendetta against Johnny for accidentally killing her kitten (the scene is removed from the English dub and is changed to him having once thrown a rock at her). That night Pinocchio sneaks into Johnny's house and steals a toy elephant, thinking it was a heart because it was carefully wrapped up, upon learning what a heart really is he returns with one of his father's chisels and wakes Johnny when he attempts to cut his heart out, the resulting ruckus wakes his parents who try to kill Pinocchio for his actions. Johnny intervenes and explains how unhappy he's been allowing both the family and the two children to reconcile and Johnny decides to take over the family business after hearing of why his great grandfather started it, meanwhile Pinocchio is disappointed he wasn't able to become human, the Oak Fairy then appears and explains to the puppet why his actions were wrong.
6	"Beware of Witches Part 1" "Boku no Kokoro ni Sumu Akuma (Mae)" (ぼくの心にすむ悪魔(前)(The Evil Magic Living In My Heart: Part 1))	8 February 1972
On the night of the full moon Geppetto tells Pinocchio not to go outside as a witch is rumoured to wander the town and abduct children for a vampire on such nights. The next day when he and his classmates are on their way to school Pinocchio is teased by Franco for believing the story and challenged to go to Devil Forest to prove he isn't afraid, ignoring Cricket's advice and the objections of the girls he follows the boys into the woods and gets separated from them. Meanwhile, the girls have told the adults what happened and a search party is organised, though Geppetto is not allowed to join, the search party finds the three boys being attacked by wolves though only Franco is successfully rescued while the other two are carried off by the wolves. Pinocchio, however, is still lost in the forest and is attacked by bats who are frightened away when Wretchel the witch appears, though she assures the puppet that she's simply a beggar and takes him to a castle in the woods where she introduces him to the beautiful Countess Leonard who offers to be his adoptive Mother. While touring the castle the countess reveals to Pinocchio that she is over 500 years old and that night she sheds her facade and attempts to bite the puppet's neck as he sleeps, only to realise that he is made of wood and has no blood for her to drink, the next day she suggests that he invite his classmates to play as an alternative to the mute dwarves living in the castle, activating the mind control spell in her bite as he leaves.
7	"Beware of Witches Part 2" "Boku no Kokoro ni Sumu Akuma (Ato)" (ぼくの心にすむ悪魔(後)(The Evil Magic Living In My Heart, Part 2))	February 15, 1972
Following the events of the previous episode Pinocchio returns home to Geppetto, much to his father's relief, but has no energy. The next day he seems back to normal and asks the girls to accompany him to the castle, though Anna is initially reluctant to go she and the others agree after hearing that Pinocchio had promised to bring them there, however he begins acting strangely as they come closer to the castle and asks the girls to removes their crosses before venturing into the forest. Back in town the mothers of the three girls tell Geppetto what has happened and warn him he will be held responsible for any harm that comes to them and he heads into the woods in search of the children; meanwhile the countess welcomes the girls to the castle but neglects Pinocchio, the Oak Fairy appears and warns him of the true nature of the countess and Wrechel (as well as making his nose grow when he lies about not having any responsibility for what happened), but assures him that he has the courage needed to set things right. The countess then tells the girls that she will use them to maintain herself, turning Rosie and Sophia into dwarves and taking Anna with her, Pinocchio becomes depressed by the mess he's caused but the spell won't allow him to help. Just then Geppetto arrives and the dwarves touch the cross he brought with him which restores them to normal and allows them to use it to save Pinocchio, Wretchel then arrives to drain everyone's blood but after being told vampires are afraid of fire Pinocchio lights his hand on fire (as matches couldn't stay lit) and defeats Wretchel, after rescuing the girls the group then goes to defeat the countess which lifts the curse on the land surrounding the castle and allows everyone to return home.
8	"Pleasureland" "Warui Yōsei wa Yonde Iru" (悪い妖精はよんでいる (The Bad Fairy Is Calling))	February 22, 1972
Pinocchio arrives home from school and doesn't want to return after having gotten into a fight with the other boys, but Geppetto convinces him not to give up. Unfortunately the next day Franco frames Pinocchio for a prank, getting him in trouble with the teacher who makes him stay late after class, on his way home he meets a girl named Clarisse who offers to take him to a place called Pleasureland where he won't have to return to school. Though both the Cricket and Oak Fairy warn him not to go he opens the door to Pleasureland anyway, not believing the Fairy's warning that he won't be able to become human if he goes, and rides a carriage there along with a number of other boys and Clarisse. Once there he joins the other children in various bad behaviours such as destroying books, smoking, and vandalising the school building; however when he goes to explore the school with another boy the two encounter and are chased by the strange monsters kept in the science lab. Pinocchio escapes to a garden of Poppies where Clarisse reveals her true nature as the Poppy Witch and attempts to turn the puppet back into a piece of wood; however he's able to call the Oak Fairy, who clashes with the Poppy Witch, Pinocchio runs to help the Oak Fairy which allows her to defeat the Witch. Pinocchio then wakes ups near the door to Pleasureland (and a wilted poppy) unsure if everything he experienced had been a dream or not, he then returns home with his books, having learnt a lesson about the cost of irresponsibility and vowing that he will continue going to school.
9	"The Magic Ring" "Boku wa Awarena Akuma Ningen" (ぼくは哀れな悪魔人間 (I'm a Pathetic Demon Human))	February 29, 1972
When Pinocchio catches a boy stealing candy, the boy's father claims he can make him real using a magic ring in exchange for either 100 gold coins or Geppetto. Though the test initially seems to work and he enjoys being able to feel and taste things, he is reluctant to trade his father until Geppetto hears the story and volunteers to be given to the magician and Pinocchio promises to save up the 100 coins needed to get him back. However, he isn't able to support himself and doesn't want to work, when he begins to doubt whether he wants to be a human after all the Oak Fairy appears and explains that he hasn't really become human and that even the unpleasant parts of being human can be rewarding, as well as how to change himself back to normal. She also sends a crow named Georgio to help keep him in line and together they try to reverse the deal, but end up being locked up with Geppetto who has been forced to carve poorly made puppets for the magician to use, however that night Pinocchio manages to reverse the ring's effect on himself. Over the following weeks he's able to execute his plan to escape by having the other puppets help people throughout the town instead of committing crimes for the magician and allowing himself to be beaten in the other puppet's stead as he can no longer feel it, eventually causing the magician to run out of money and allowing Georgio to steal the ring, undoing its magic and forcing the magician and his son to become beggars.
10	"Never Tell a Lie" "Boku no Hana ga Nobiru Toki" (ぼくの鼻がのびる時 (When My Nose Gets Longer))	March 7, 1972
Pinocchio attempts to relieve his boredom by telling lies to cause a panic and enjoying the resulting uproar; first frightening Geppetto by claiming there's a monster in the woods and later running through town claiming there's a fire near the Mayor's house, the latter resulting in Pinocchio being beaten by the townspeople and Geppetto giving the Mayor a treasured carving he had been unwilling to sell to him earlier in exchange for calling off the angry crowd. After the incident Geppetto decides to wait to reattach Pinocchio's repaired limbs so he will have to reflect on his actions; however, Pinocchio convinces Jack and Willie to reattach them and runs off play, only for the Oak Fairy to punish him instead by making his nose grow longer when he lies and only changing it back once he promises to be truthful. Unfortunately the other children refuse to play with him because of the trouble he caused and he instead ends up spending time with a wandering robber who tricks him into breaking into the Mayor's house where he discovers Geppetto's carving and realises what the robber is trying to do. When he's caught nobody believes that Pinocchio had been tricked into breaking in until the real culprit is caught and confirms Pinocchio's story.
11	"A Mother's Love" "Haha no Ai ga Shiritai no" (母の愛がしりたいの (I Want To Know A Mother's Love))	March 14, 1972
After bullying him for being a puppet one of Pinocchio's classmates, Jocko, falls through a bridge and drowns. Pinocchio begins to feel guilt for Jocko's death, despite being the only one who tried to save him, and offers to take his place to his grieving mother, Emily. Though she initially refuses and blames Pinocchio for the accident, she eventually decides to take him in after he spends an entire rainy night on her doorstep (much to his father's worry), however things become increasingly strained between them as Jocko's mother constantly compares Pinocchio to him resulting in the two arguing though eventually deciding to give being a family another try. Unfortunately Emily is still grieving for her son and when Pinocchio walks in on her looking at a drawing Jocko had made he becomes angry and tells her how Jocko had been bullying him before returning home. Though Jocko's mother's is initially angry, she eventually realises that she needs to finish grieving and can never truly replace her son, the next day she reconciles with Pinocchio, who has realised his own mistake, and packing a lunch for him to take to school.
12	"I Won't Be Fooled Around" "Boku wa Mō Damasarenai" (ぼくはもうだまされない (I Won't Be Tricked Again))	March 21, 1972
When Pinocchio gets good marks in school he tries to become more helpful at home too, which irritates Charlie as Pinocchio closes off his mouse hole since his teacher said animals should not be allowed indoors. This prompts Charlie to ask Jack and Willie to get rid of the puppet and the next day when Pinocchio is trying to catch fish for his father the animals offer to take him to a better place to fish, tying an anchor to his leg and throwing him overboard once they're over the deepest part of the lake, though he manages to save himself by pulling his leg off and retrieving it later. The following day Nora also gets involved and suggests to Pinocchio that a priest may be able to grant his wish, convincing him to skip school in order to travel to a far-off monastery in a desert like mountain, where the two priests (actually Jack and Willie in disguise) tie him to a cross claiming that a miracle may occur if he stays there for three days. Eventually the heat begins to take its toll on the puppet and the Oak Fairy assures him that he will escape safely, soon it begins to rain though he's now in danger from the resulting flash flood. Seeing this Charlie begins to feel guilty and frees Pinocchio by chewing through the ropes, when they return home he removes the board from Charlie's house and the two begin to become friends.
13	"I Have a Dream, Too" "Boku ni Datte Yume ga Aru" (ぼくにだって夢がある (Even I Can Have A Dream))	March 28, 1972
Pinocchio accompanies his father when he goes to sell his carvings in a nearby town, but runs off when people keep trying to buy him instead, Geppetto catches up to him and buys him a set of clothing that covers his joints and make him appear human. When he goes to apologise to some butterflies he argued with he meets a girl named Melody and the two quickly become friends when he helps her hide from her governess. It turns out that Melody is a wealthy heiress and she invites Pinocchio and Geppetto to meet her parents and help her tell them how she feels about not being allowed to play as other children do, after a bit of discussion it is decided that Pinocchio will stay with them for a while. Over the following days the two children enjoy each other's company, though Pinocchio never mentions that he's made of wood (despite Cricket's prompting and her nearly finding out). When Melody's birthday comes up Pinocchio's father is invited to the party, where the puppet is embarrassed by his manners and has him leave early; after the party Melody asks Pinocchio if he will marry her when they grow up which he agrees to despite not being able to grow at all. Later that night Pinocchio realises that he can't keep his promise and the Oak Fairy explains that hiding the truth from Melody will cause more harm than good and he promises to tell Melody the truth tomorrow. The next morning he still cannot bring himself to tell her, however the truth is accidentally revealed when he gets in a fight with some of the boys from the party while saving the butterflies from before. Though Melody is devastated by the revelation, Pinocchio promises that he will never forget her and will come see her again when he's become a human before returning to his father.
14	"Save the Oak Tree" "Boku no Kashi no Ki wa Nokotta" (ぼくの樫の木はのこった(My Oak Tree Remained))	April 4, 1972
The animals that live in the Oak Fairy's tree notice it being measured by land surveyors one morning and ask Pinocchio to find out what their intentions are, though he isn't able to find out anything from Mr. Bankman, Franco explains that his father is planning to build an amusement park on the land. Though Pinocchio is excited about the amusement park, the animals realise the tree will be cut down, Pinocchio is initially indifferent but once Cricket reminds him that the Oak Fairy lives in that tree and will die if the tree is cut down, the puppet decides he will do everything he can to save the tree. When Mr. Bankman again ignores Pinocchio, Georgio the crow tries to get the man's attention, only to be shot by him and Pinocchio's hand is damaged while trying to save the crow; while Georgio is expected to make a full recovery, Geppetto has run out of wood from the branch he used to make Pinocchio resulting in the new hand being much weaker than the old one. Geppetto goes to appeal to Mr. Bankman to leave the tree alone but is also unsuccessful and suggests that they try to ask the Oak Fairy herself to stop the men using a carving he made of her. The next day the animals of the forest, along with Pinocchio and his father, gather for the tree being felled. In a final effort to save the tree the puppet asks the Oak Fairy to use her magic to protect herself for the sake of the animals that depend on her, just as work is about to begin on felling the tree a powerful rainstorm starts, scaring away the workers and causing Mr. Bankman to nearly fall off a cliff before being saved by the woodcarver and his son. Out of gratitude Franco's father promises not to cut the tree down, that night the Oak Fairy appears to thank Pinocchio and praise him for his selflessness before using her magic to restore his hand to normal.
15	"I'm Falling Apart!" "Ki no Ashi Datte Ikite Iru" (木の脚だっていきている(I Have Wooden Legs, But I'm Alive))	April 11, 1972
Pinocchio accompanies his father to help repair a dam, but is called away by his schoolmates to help them fish in the river as he's the only one who can stand the cold temperature, unfortunately this results in his left leg becoming infested by termites and needing to be replaced. However his new leg doesn't work without the Oak Fairy's magic and he becomes frustrated about both his leg and his life in general, even snapping at Geppetto. The next day Jack and Willie try to trick Pinocchio into catching fish for them by opening the dam and draining some of the water out, claiming that they'll take him to see an expert who can repair his leg once he does, only to run away once it begins raining and leaving the puppet stranded. Pinocchio then notices a hole in the dam caused by his efforts to open it earlier and sacrifices one of his arms to repair the damage, later his damaged limbs have been replaced but are still useless, until the Fairy appears and rewards his bravery by working her magic on his new limbs.
16	"Monkey Business" "Oshiete yo, Saru Sensei" (教えてよ、サル先生 (Teach Me, Professor Monkey))	April 18, 1972
Geppetto send Pinocchio to the hardware store in the next town, but on the way he encounters a chimpanzee named Pica who has been trained to act like a human gentleman, impressed by the animal he asks to become his student and soon ends up living with Pica and his owner Edith (though he has trouble adjusting to his new surroundings). Soon he learns that Pica considers himself superior to humans and begins to feel conflicted as to whether he should believe him or not, meanwhile Jack and Willie have tracked down Pinocchio and tell him that foxes are the smartest species, as well as attempt to capitalise on his good fortune by having him bring them food under the threat of burning him if he doesn't comply. Later Pinocchio helps Pica prepare for a party and asks him whether what Jack said about foxes is true and Pica assures him it's not, after remembering his promise Pinocchio brings Jack and Willie some food from the kitchen and when he's sent to get something to drink as well Pica informs Edith who catches the puppet and imprisons him in the cellar, when Pinocchio tells Pica about the trouble he was faced with the chimpanzee gloats before leaving for the party (where he enjoys embarrassing the other guests). That night Jack and Willie break into Pica's room and try to coerce him into feeding them, trashing his room and starting a fight when he refuses, Edith walks in and throws Pica in the cellar as well to be sold to the circus; as the two wait the Oak Fairy appears to Pinocchio and explains that the three animals were acting in their own interests and that he needs to learn to tell true friends from false ones and to stand up for his beliefs, but assures him that he is learning. When the ringmaster arrives he takes Pica, but Pinocchio is allowed to go free, despite everything he feels sorry for Pica and tries to convince Edith to change her mind, but she simply leaves. As Pinocchio is reflecting on the day Geppetto, who had begun to worry and gone looking for him, finds him and takes him home.
17	"Pinocchio's Brother" "Boku no Kibō ga Tonde Yuku" (ぼくの希望がとんでゆく (My Younger Brother Is Flying Away))	April 25, 1972
Pinocchio finds an egg in the forest and takes it home where it hatches later that night. The chick decides to set off on his own but finds the other birds want nothing to do with him, the next day Pinocchio finds the small bird and adopts him as his younger brother, naming him Chick. Though the two become close, Chick quickly grows over the summer while the puppet remains the same; eventually a group of storks appear and inform Chick that he's their lost Prince and they have come to take him home, though Chick decides that he would rather stay. While the pair are initially happy, Chick begins to wish he could meet his parents and when he is injured by a hunter, Pinocchio realises that staying with him will endanger Chick. Once Chick has recovered the flock returns to take him home, though Chick promises that he'll return to visit Pinocchio and gives him his crown to signify their promise.
18	"From Rags to Riches" "Ningyō Datte Erainda" (人形だってえらいんだ (A Puppet Can Be Grand Too))	May 2, 1972
When a trick by Jack and Willie causes Pinocchio to be caught in a bear trap, he catches the attention of the local lord Donaldson who decides to adopt Pinocchio as his heir; though Geppetto initially refuses, Pinocchio sneaks out in the night to allow himself to be adopted in order to save the woodcarver from the high land tax lord Donaldson is charging to try to force his hand, leaving him despondent. Though the puppet promises to always remember that Geppetto is his true father, he soon begins to adopt Donaldson's mindset that he is above those around him and proceeds to chase his servants on horseback, ride his horse recklessly through town, and ignore his former father and classmates. Eventually the Fairy punishes him for his thoughtlessness by turning his nose into a tree branch, this causes lord Donaldson to disown him and toss him into woods surrounding his property, stripped of both his title and clothing. When Pinocchio finally makes it back to Geppetto's house his father is too depressed to open the door or recognise his voice, until an angry mob appears and tries to burn Pinocchio for antagonising them, causing Geppetto to brave the flames to rescue his son and the Oak Fairy to restore his nose to normal.
19	"The Magic Violin" "Makeruna! Mahō no Baiorin (Mae)" (負けるな!魔法のバイオリン(前) (Don't Give Up! The Magic Violin, Part 1))	May 16, 1972
While Anna is practicing her violin Pinocchio asks to try, though he learns to play it quickly he trips and accidentally breaks it. Despite having no experience making musical instruments Geppetto agrees to try carving a new one if Pinocchio can find the right type of wood, while in the forest he encounters an ancient maple tree and its owl guardian who explains that the tree's life has been plagued by its attempts to do good deeds ending in disaster and wishes to perform just one good act that turns out well before it dies. Thus the tree allows for part of its wood to be made into a violin, though the owl warns to be careful as it will likely have magical properties, and the instrument is completed though Anna does not want it because it looks strange and lets Pinocchio keep it, when he becomes frustrated The Oak Fairy appears and hints at how the magic of the violin works. After this Pinocchio begins to practice playing the violin, though he doesn't play it as well as he did Anna's, until he comes across a village that's suffering due to a drought and tries to play the violin to cheer up the farmers and the violin not only plays beautifully but causes rain to fall and the crops to flourish. The next day he goes to the city to try playing for money but the violin won't co-operate and he's thrown in the castle prison for fraud, however Cricket has noticed that the King and Queen living in the castle are searching for a treatment for their daughter who has not spoken in weeks, after telling Pinocchio this the puppet convinces the guard to let him try curing her with music. By focusing on curing the Princess he is able to succeed by creating a series of wonderful images with his music, however one of the ministers is starting some trouble.
20	"Greedy Kings are Evil Kings" "Makeruna! Mahō no Baiorin (Ato)" (負けるな!魔法のバイオリン(後) (Don't Give Up! The Magic Violin, Part 2))	May 23, 1972
After curing Princess Penelope in the previous episode Pinocchio has been spending time playing with her at the castle and making images for her with his music, however the King and some of his advisors wonder what to do about having a magical object in the castle. The minister of war proposes forcing the puppet to make weapons for them and that they should do so immediately as he believes the violin's magic is finite, the king is reluctant to do so but orders Pinocchio to use the violin to make gold for him and imprisons him when he isn't able to and the violin berates the king for his actions. The king also has Geppetto arrested for carving it, believing he has carved other violins to mock him, meanwhile the general is launching a revolt against the king which interrupts his attempt to burn the violin. During the commotion the Princess rescues the violin and brings it to Pinocchio who uses it to make a key and unlock the cell, though he's reluctant to help the king due to his wicked behaviour, though he changes his mind and agrees to help after Penelope assures him her father is normally a good man and Geppetto reminds the puppet of his own attempts to misuse the violin's power. Just as the general confronts the king, Pinocchio shows up playing the violin which he uses to summon an army that overpowers the general's and chases him away, saving the royal family. However on the way home Pinocchio and his father run into the General, who destroys the violin when it won't play for him, an act that causes the owl to appear and toss him over a waterfall, though Geppetto tries to repair the violin, when the puppet plays it the violin's spirit thanks him but says that its time has come and asks to be burnt and returned to the rest of the maple tree. Doing this causes a new bud to sprout from the tree's stump, showing that its spirit is still there and will one day grow into a tree again.
21	"The Treasure of Utopia Island" "Boku ga Sagashita Takaramono" (ぼくがさがした宝物 (The Treasure Island I Searched For))	May 30, 1972
Leon finds a map to the treasure of the famed pirate Captain Renolds and proposes to his friends that they search for it, Franco suggests they recruit Pinocchio to dive for the treasure (and leave the puppet stranded after he's found it) as he doesn't need to breathe. The three boys find Pinocchio going to school with Anna, who tries to dissuade him from going as the area is said to be cursed and guarded by a sea monster, but he quickly agrees to go after being promised a share of the treasure, which he plans to surprise his father with and the four boys head off on Leon's homemade raft. However Anna is still worried about them, especially after the weather begins to worsen, and she tells the adults what happened; unfortunately the hostile weather prevents the search party from departing and the worried parents blame Pinocchio for dragging his classmates into the treasure hunt, even when Anna explains that the opposite is true. Meanwhile, the boys have survived the storm, though they've lost their sail and their supplies have been ruined by saltwater, Franco convinces Pinocchio to go into the water to help catch one of the small sharks swimming near their boat by knocking it out when it tries to bite him. Afterwards they send him to search for the treasure which he eventually finds in a sunken ship, however the shipwreck is soon attacked by the sea monster, a giant catfish that eats Pinocchio when he tries to return to the surface, fortunately the puppet finds a sword inside the treasure chest and begins trying to cut his way out of the monster. Meanwhile, the parents have found the other boys and brought them aboard the rescue ship but refuse Geppetto's requests to stay and look for Pinocchio, as they prepare to leave the sea monster begins attacking the ship, however before the monster can attack Pinoccho finds and stabs the creature's heart before cutting his way out of the fish. Once Pinocchio and the treasure are on board Geppetto scolds his son for making him worry, but is touched that he wanted to surprise him with the treasure. Pinocchio then shows everyone what else was inside the chest: the skeleton of Captain Renolds (though Pinocchio thinks it's a marionette); the ship's crew is impressed that he not only killed the sea monster and removed the curse from the island but found the remains of the pirate captain, which makes the parents feel guilty over their own behaviour, and everyone returns home.
22	"The Sorrowful Stranger" "Kanashimi Hakase Sayōnara" (カナシミ博士さようなら (Goodbye Professor Sadness))	June 6, 1972
A traveling stranger comes to town whose goal in life is to rid the world of suffering which he does through both acts of charity and a mysterious concoction, which he begins brewing in an abandoned mill. Meanwhile, the animals in the surrounding forest are troubled by several of them beginning to laugh uncontrollably and ask Pinocchio to investigate; he discovers the "laughter potion" which the professor had been preparing was the cause of the outbreak, but offers to be his assistant when he hears what the professor had been trying to do with the promise that the professor will try to use his knowledge of chemistry to make him human. However, the professor's horse has doubts about his owner's plan, which seem to be confirmed when the potion causes everyone who drinks it, including the professor, to laugh uncontrollably leaving Pinocchio to try to make an antidote from the instructions in the book. Though the antidote works on both the humans and animals, the villagers set fire to the professor's lab and run him out of town, however the incident has taught both him and Pinocchio that sorrow is a part of human life and that you can't get rid of it altogether.
23	"The Money Tree" "Okane no Naru Ki o Sagase" (おかねのなる木を探せ (Searching For The Money Tree))	July 6, 1972
Geppetto sends Pinocchio to buy bread with his last copper coin, but on the way he becomes distracted by an animal salesman and uses the coin to buy a baby squirrel instead. When the cage breaks open the squirrel escapes and is reunited with his mother, who offers Pinocchio the choice of a gold, silver or copper coin to replace the one he spent, however he chooses the gold coin. Jack, Willie, and Charlie who have been watching the whole thing and plot to trick him out of his gold coin by telling him of a money tree growing in the mountains and having him plant the coin next to it. While he is able to retrieve the tree, whose guardian cannot harm him as they are both made of wood, the animals steal and spend the coin while Pinocchio is telling his father about his day; meanwhile the spirit of the money tree finds the Oak Fairy and asks for her help, though the puppet refuses to move the tree back. That night the tree grows rapidly and the light from the coins it produces wakes Pinocchio and attracts the attention of both the three animals and the villagers who fight over the coins from the tree, resulting in the villagers cutting the tree down and the coins reverting to leaves, teaching Pinocchio an important lesson. The next day the baby squirrel gives him a copper coin to buy the bread with, the puppet apologises for his actions the previous day and goes to complete his original errand.
24	"Mermaids and Pirates" "Ningyo to Tomo ni Kieta Yume (Mae)" (人魚とともに消えた夢(前) (A Dream that Vanished with the Mermaid, Part 1)	July 13, 1972
Pinocchio visits a carnival for the first time along with the other children where one of the attractions is a Mermaid named Melissa said to be able to breathe life into a piece of wood, thinking she'll be able to make him human he sneaks in to see her (as he doesn't have money left for a ticket) and she asks him to set her free. When the carnival leaves town he breaks open her tank as it passes over a river, allowing her to escape, Pinocchio then swims after her and helps her avoid being recaptured. After hearing how she was the Mermaid Princess and was captured by the Pirate Captain Patch when she broke her people's rule and swam near the surface during the day and was then stolen from Patch by the carnival owner Sneeroff (though he clearly has a different design from the usual Sneeroff), Pinocchio offers to escort her home in exchange for being turned into a human, though Melissa doesn't know how and instead promises to ask the Mermaid elder to do it. Once they arrive they see the Pirates have captured the other Mermaids who they plan to interrogate to find sunken treasures, they manage to make it to the Mermaid elder, but she cannot make him human and Melissa reveals that she lied to him so he would help her because she was afraid of being captured again. Distraught Pinocchio runs away where he encounters the Pirates.
25	"I'll Be a Pirate!" "Ningyo to tomo ni Kieta Yume (Ato)" (人魚とともに消えた夢(後) (A Dream that Vanished with the Mermaid, Part 2)	July 20, 1972
After being betrayed by Melissa, Pinocchio encounters the Pirates who offer to spare him and make him a member of the crew if he helps them get the Mermaids to tell them where their hidden treasure is, when the captured Mermaids don't give him the answer he offers to take the Pirates to Melissa and the Elder. Once they find the Mermaids the Elder relents and Melissa swims after them to save Pinocchio from the Sea Cucumber Monster guarding it, the Monster turns the Pirates into sea urchins and turns his attention to the puppet. Melissa appears and takes responsibility for her breaking the law and lying to Pinocchio, who in turn acknowledges his own bad behaviour, the Sea Cucumber lets them leave as they both were able to acknowledge and learn from their mistakes on their own and the elder reveals the Mermaid's true treasure is the trust they have for each other. The two children then go to rescue the captured Mermaids with the help of a swordfish who cuts a hole in the ship, the carnival owner comes along on his ship but ignores the stranded Pirates in favour of trying to capture the Mermaids, the Sea Cucumber then appears and summons a whirlpool that drags both ships to the ocean floor. The grateful Mermaids tell Pinocchio that he'll always be welcome on their island and call a Dolphin to bring him home, though Pinocchio is excited to tell his classmates, he realises that the only way they would believe him is if he betrayed the Mermaids' secret and decides to keep the story to himself.
26	"The Snake with Three Heads" "Ojī-chan Shinanai de" (おじいちゃん死なないで (Don't Die, Grandpa))	June 27, 1972
Geppetto falls gravely ill and the village Doctor informs Pinocchio that the only hope for his father is the herb of life, a medicinal plant that grows on snake mountain, but retrieving it is so dangerous that only one person has ever successfully done so. Despite his father's insistence that it is not worth the risk, Pinocchio sets off to snake mountain; however Jack, Willie, and Charlie are also planning to retrieve the herb in order to win Geppetto's gratitude and sabotage Pinocchio by switching the sign. After briefly being distracted by an invitation from a group of children, the puppet finds out he's been going the wrong way and arrives at the cave on snake mountain in time to save the three animals after their plan to drug the three-headed snake guarding the herb backfires. Unfortunately this results in Pinocchio being eaten by one of the heads, the Oak Fairy appears and although she's not able to use her magic to help him, she tells him that he can save himself with the knowledge that each head is ruled by a single trait: greed, pride, and jealousy. Using this Pinocchio throws his voice to impersonate each head and use their traits against them, causing them to fight each other to the death and allowing him to escape unharmed. However the three animals have already made off with the herb, though he's disappointed he won't be able to keep his promise, Cricket reminds him that as long as his father recovers that's all that matters and later helps him notice the herb on a nearby ledge (having been dropped when Jack, Willie and Charlie's own bickering causes them to fall off). Once home Pinocchio is able to prepare the medicine and cure his father, though he's eager to share his story the puppet soon falls asleep.
27	"I Want to Fly!" "Kokoro no Tsubada o Arigatō" (心の翼をありがとう (Thank You For The Wings Of My Heart))	July 4, 1972
While Pinocchio is playing with a girl named Lina he claims to be able to fly, and promises to take her flying one day. That evening he asks his father to make a pair of wings for him, but he refuses as he's worried Pinocchio will hurt himself; the next day he finds and rescues a baby crow that's tangled in a fence who promises to take him to the Crow King and help him learn to fly in exchange for saving him. Once they reach the castle and tell King Crow what happened he gives Pinocchio a magic pill that causes him to grow temporary wings (though they resemble tree branches with a thick coat of leaves), teaches him to fly with them, and tells three him rules he must follow: Treat others as you would be treated, never tell a lie, and don't fly into town. However the puppet soon begins to break these rules as he antagonises the forest animals and teases Lina, to punish him for his bad behaviour King Crow creates a storm which Pinocchio rescues Lina from, getting knocked out by the crash landing they make when the magic wears off and his wings vanish. The two children wake up, mysteriously transported to a meadow full of flowers and unsure if the experience was a dream, though Pinocchio sees King Crow in the sky reminding him of the lesson he's learnt.
28	"Nobody Can Save Me Now!" "Boku no Ashi ni Ne ga Haeta" (ぼくの脚に根がはえた (My Legs Have Grown Roots))	July 11, 1972
Jonathan, an old friend of Geppetto's, comes to visit and Pinocchio accidentally damages the crutch he carries while playing with it. Later that day Pinocchio finds an unusually large fish while playing with the other boys and Johnathan tells them that it likely came from the Phantom Spring, which is said to have magic properties that would have made the fish grow and Pinocchio decides that it will not only make him human, but an adult as well. The next morning he sets off to find the pond and he runs into two of the other boys who plan to fish there, when the three find it they convince Pinocchio to help them catch a fish, only to run off and leave him in the pond once they have their prize. While trying to get home the puppet notices that he's having increasingly more trouble moving his legs and realises that he's grown roots and branches; the pond has made him grow into a small tree, soon a man wanders by, digs him up to sell and forces him to sing for the guests at a dinner party. Later the Oak Fairy appears to him, but cannot change him back to normal until he performs a selfless act, meanwhile word of the singing tree reaches Geppetto but by this time Pinocchio has already been sold and loaded onto a ship. In the ship's hold with him are several children who have been captured and will be sold as servants overseas, who Pinocchio rescues when the ship sails into a storm by allowing them to hold onto him until a rescue boat appears. Though he's mistaken for a piece of driftwood and left behind in the water, the Oak Fairy returns him to normal and helps him return to Geppetto.
29	"Captured by Bandits" "Sanzoku-domo no Mae ni Tate" (山賊どもの前にたて (Stand in front of the Bandits)	July 18, 1972
While exploring in the mountains Pinocchio and Franco witness the infamous bandit, Scallywag, and his gang robbing a stagecoach and are captured; the two manage to save themselves by offering to join his gang but are sent to help the outlaws break into one of the wealthiest homes in the area. Though Pinocchio realises what he's being asked to do is wrong, he's afraid the bandits will kill him if he leaves and follows the orders he's given, however when the old man living in the mansion is shot by Scallywag, he saves the man's granddaughter, Lucy. Later that evening when Pinocchio tries to bring some food to Lucy she refuses his help as she blames him for her grandfather's death, when he storms off in frustration the Oak Fairy appears and tells him that even though he didn't commit the crime himself he's still guilty of standing by and letting happen, however the spirits of the surrounding trees doubt he's capable of understanding. When the puppet tries to justify his actions his nose grows longer as he's lying to himself and the Oak fairy finally gets him to admit that he likes being one of the bandits (because he realises he's neither a Human nor Tree and the bandits don't expect him to be either one) and tells him that he must try to right the wrongs he's witnessed, though he isn't sure what he should do or how he's supposed to do anything without his nose being returned to normal. Nevertheless he tries to free Lucy before she can be sold by the bandits, unfortunately they're both quickly captured; the next morning they learn that the bandits plan to raid Pinocchio's village using Franco as a hostage and that Lucy's parents are likely there as well, the elderly tree Pinocchio is tied to hears him wishing to save everyone and sacrifices himself to free the puppet, whose nose is also restored to normal. Unfortunately everyone in the village chooses to run away and wait for Scallywag to leave, rather than stand up to him; however Pinocchio realises that if they don't stand up to the bandits now they'll never be rid of them and manages to convince his father to stay and help protect the village. Pinocchio then rescues Franco by appearing to pay the ransom, but tricks the bandits into trading him for a bag of rocks and manages to hold off Scallywag by taking advantage of being more agile and immune to the bullets (as he's made of wood); meanwhile Lucy and Franco catch up with the rest of the villagers and tell them of everything that's happened, convincing them to return to defend their home. They arrive just in time as Geppetto, who had been waiting with a gun, cannot bring himself to shoot another person, even as he's threatening to kill Pinocchio; Franco's father shoots Scallywag, causing the rest of the bandits to scatter, and Lucy is reunited with her parents who she wants to introduce to Pinocchio. However he's already taking the bandit's horse for a ride and when he falls off he encounters Sneeroff, who has tracked him down and is set on revenge.
30	"Be a Clown!" "Boku wa Piero-janai!" (ぼくはピエロじゃない!(I'm Not A Clown!))	July 25, 1972
After being captured by Sneeroff Pinocchio saves Jack and Willie, who are captured in one of Sneeroff's traps, by convincing the man to train them as performing animals. Though the two animals have difficulty learning to balance on a ball Pinocchio manages to learn quickly, but Sneeroff insists that the performance was bad as he's supposed to be a clown and fall off of the ball to make the audience laugh as clowns, despite the puppet's objections about being a clown and humiliating himself by pretending to be bad at something. Meanwhile, Geppetto heads out in search of his son and Charlie eventually decides to accompany him; while on tour Pinocchio misses his father and gets in trouble with Sneeroff when he stops performing his clown routine to perform tricks while balancing on a ball and when he ruins a clown boxing act by fighting for real. Because the group didn't make any money that day, Sneeroff sends his performers to steal chickens from a nearby farm, along with his dog Doro to make sure they return; Jack and Willie each manage to steal a chicken but Pinocchio wakes one up which alerts Geppetto, however when he tries to warn the farmers they tie him up in the barn until Charlie frees him, meanwhile Sneeroff refuses to give the animals either of the chickens they stole for him. After the events of the night Pinocchio performs his clown act properly, but still misses his father and hates being humiliated.
31	"Find Pinocchio!" "Jiyū ni Mukatte Nigerunda" (自由にむかって逃げるんだ (Run Away Towards Freedom)	August 1, 1972
Pinocchio tries to keep Jack and Willie optimistic as they travel through the desert to the next town in Sneeroff's wagon, but he still misses his father who is traveling to the same town in search of him. Once there the performing troupe has such a successful day that they plan to stay for several weeks, which Pinocchio is glad to hear as it will give his father the chance to find him, meanwhile Geppetto hasn't been able to sell any carvings and becomes angry with Charlie for stealing food. Later that evening Jack and Willie help Pinocchio to escape, only to betray him to Sneeroff a few minutes later, allowing them to run away while Sneeroff is busy with the puppet. The two animals run into Geppetto in some ruins, but lie to him that they haven't seen his son; Sneeroff soon catches up with them and captures Jack and Willie, but also denies knowing Pinocchio and leaves right before Charlie returns. The next day Sneeroff packs up to move on to the next town in order to prevent Pinocchio from finding his father and leaving the troupe with Jack and Willie deciding it's best they not say that they found Geppetto, who is having much better luck selling his carvings; as they leave Pinocchio sees the crowd gathered around his father's booth, but doesn't realise how close he is.
32	"Lost at Sea" "Waakre no Fune wa Ankoku Tairiku e" (別れの船は暗黒大陸へ (The Farewell Ship Heads to the Dark Continent)	August 8, 1972
Pinocchio is still being held by Sneeroff, who is now using the puppet in a magic act where he pretends to bring him to life. After the audience fails to pay for a show a wealthy gentleman who was once a street performer gives Sneeroff a large bag of gold and invites him to dinner, where he tells him that he made his fortune by finding diamonds in Africa and where they could still be found, which gives Sneeroff the idea to go hunting for them despite the dangers to his performers. Meanwhile, Pinocchio, Jack, and Willie are all staying outside in the wagon and guarded by Doro, when Pinocchio talks about how much he misses his father the two animals let slip that he's been searching for him, which lifts the Puppet's spirits and the three decide to escape. However when they try to get past Doro the resulting chase damages the gentleman's carriage and alerts Sneeroff who gathers everyone and leaves before the gentleman finds out, passing by Geppetto on their way. The next day Geppetto walks by the gentleman's house and offers to repair the carriage, until he hears who caused the damage and runs to find Pinocchio; unfortunately he isn't able to run fast enough to reach the docks and sends Charlie ahead who frees Pinocchio and the animals from the cage after hearing Sneeroff's plans to leave the others to die once they find the diamonds. However, the ship has already set sail, when Pinocchio decides to follow the Oak Fairy's advice not to lose hope she appears to tell him help is coming right before a storm starts and a giant walrus attacks the ship with the wreckage washing up on a nearby shore.
33	"Pinocchio Saves the Day" "Omochadatte Okorusa" (オモチャだっておこるさ(Even A Toy Can Get Angry))	August 15, 1972
After the shipwreck Pinocchio washes ashore in Morocco where he's rescued by a girl who looks after him as he recovers from the ordeal, once he's able to go out she takes him to the puppet maker's shop to see if he can repair his hand. However the man is drunk and shouts at his son Dennis before tearfully admitting that he wishes he could make and repair puppets again, but hasn't been able to since children haven't been playing with them, which has caused him to drown his sorrows in alcohol. Dennis then gets the idea that children would buy puppets from his father again if all of their old ones were gone and sets to work organising a toy festival where all the children in town will create a bonfire and burn their old and broken toys and recruits two boys to help him break toys that are still good so they will be burnt at the festival; however both Pinocchio and the girl agree that burning broken toys is wrong and decide to boycott the festival, though they aren't able to convince Dennis to cancel it. Upset by both the injustice of the toy festival and the frightened cries of the broken toys Pinocchio goes to try to stop it and sees lights flying out of the pit the toys are being thrown into. These lights tell the forces of nature what the children plan to do, angering them that their gifts are being treated with such disrespect, and Pinocchio once more tells Dennis what he's doing is wrong, only for the children to try to throw him in the pit to be burnt with the other toys. However the forces of nature intervene and attack the children, but assure the puppet that he won't be harmed; he asks for the children to be spared as well since they've learnt their lesson, but a tree lashes out and strikes him, knocking off most of his limbs. The children realise their mistake, prompting Dennis to confess that the festival was an excuse to destroy toys so everyone would have to buy new ones from his father and offers to have him repair Pinocchio. After repairing the puppet Dennis' father sets to work repairing the other toys, glad to be working again he gives up drinking and reconciles with Dennis; seeing the now happy family reminds Pinocchio how much he misses his own father and he sets off to search for him again, not realising he's being followed by Sneeroff.
34	"Sophia Sees" "Boku wa Kami no Ko Mokku da" (ぼくは神の子モックだ!(I Am Mokku, Child Of The Gods!))	August 22, 1972
Sneeroff catches up with Pinocchio but as he runs away he finds Geppetto, unfortunately the three are captured by guards who believe that the puppet is a monster from the planet Jupiter and plan to burn him, the execution is stopped by the bishop who saves Pinocchio by saying that he is an emissary of the gods. Though this saves him, he has to play the role of emissary and remain in the temple, while Geppetto is still imprisoned. Charlie frees Pinocchio and as the puppet searches the temple he meets Sophia, the bishop's daughter who has been blind since she ate a poisonous nut years before; the bishop deceived the citizens in order to pay for the herbs needed to treat her, though she objects to Pinocchio being exploited. Meanwhile, Dr. Dee convinces the citizens that the bishop has deceived them using a doll with clockwork and throwing his voice and leads them to revolt against the bishop, Pinocchio sees this and goes back to save Sophia by stating that he is the emissary he claims to be and that Geppetto is his servant, having Charlie create a fake supernatural occurrence, this turns the angry mob against Dr Dee instead and saves Sophia and her father. The Oak Fairy appears and Pinocchio apologises for having deceived so many people, but the Fairy is proud of him for having been brave for the sake of others and helps by producing the herb needed to cure Sophia whose sight is restored. As Pinocchio goes off in search of his father he runs into Sneeroff who plans to search for diamonds.
35	"Guardian of the Tomb" "Hakamori Kaijū Itsu Made mo" (墓守怪獣いつまでも(A Grave Guarding Monster Forevermore))	August 29, 1972
After being captured by Sneeroff Pinocchio briefly reunites with his father when he catches up with the caravan they were traveling with, only to be separated again by a sand storm. Pinocchio wakes up half way up a pyramid and climbs inside where he finds Sneeroff who has him accompany him into the treasure-filled tomb where they are captured by the tomb's guardians. While the guardians lock up Sneeroff for attempting to rob the tomb they let Pinocchio stay in the pyramid as a playmate for their son, Kron, who tells Pinocchio of how he and his parents are aliens who guard the tomb of the Pharoh to repay the hospitality he showed them when their ship crash landed on Earth and how he wishes to see the world outside. Pinocchio reluctantly agrees to help Kron sneak out and explore when he sees how miserable he is and Kron frees Sneeroff to be their guide, ignoring Pinocchio's warning that not all humans can be trusted. Once they're outside Sneeroff has a caravan of traveling merchants capture Kron and holds him hostage in exchange for the treasure. Though Kron's Mother offers her necklace in exchange for her son, his father refuses to go back on his promise and instead tries to fight off the humans; during the fight Pinocchio attempts to free Kron, while Kron's parents begin to grow to a massive size out of rage which Kron explains will likely kill them. When his parents are knocked out Kron decides to help them fight, however his parents use the last of their energy against the humans and die, leaving only Sneeroff who Kron allows to escape; explaining he'll tell others what happened and nobody will try to rob the tomb again, which he'll now protect to honor his parents' sacrifice. After bidding farewell to Kron Pinocchio once again begins to search for his father and walks until he reaches the jungle, where he meets a lion.
36	"The Princess and the Dragon" "Boku no Mahō wa Yūki to Chieda" (ぼくの魔法は勇気と知恵だ (My Magic Is Courage And Knowledge))	September 5, 1972
A lion appears as Pinocchio is traveling through the jungle and asks him to remove a thorn from his paw, though the lion warns him not to travel through the swamp the puppet goes ahead with his original plan in order to search for his father, when he falls in lion sacrifices himself to save him and assures him that he wouldn't have lived long anyway as the thorn was poisonous. After leaving the swamp Pinocchio rescues a rabbit from a carnivorous plant and learns that the rabbit is a human who was cursed with the rest of his people when a magician named Dragonaro appeared and transformed all the men in his city into forest animals and all the women into aquatic creatures, save for the Princess who he imprisoned when she refused to marry him. When he refuses to help Pinocchio is scolded by Cricket and then runs into Gero, Dragonaro's henchman who takes him to the castle suspecting that he is another magician, Dragonaro insists that Pinocchio must have magical powers and imprisons him until the evening, intending to kill the puppet if he does not demonstrate his powers then. With both Pinocchio and Cricket being at a loss at how to escape Pinocchio suddenly has an idea and asks what date it is, that night he declares that he will demonstrate his powers by making the moon disappear which he seemingly does, frightening Dragonaro and Gero into running away. He explains the trick to Cricket; that he remembered his teacher mentioning that a lunar eclipse would be happening there this night and took advantage of it to make it appear as if he used magic, he then goes to rescue Princess Rayel but Dragonaro hears him mention he isn't a magician, prompting him to lie that he is, and orders him to melt polar peak. In the dungeon again Pinocchio gets the idea to solve his problem by defeating Dragonaro rather than complying with him, the Oak Fairy appears and tells him that Dragonaro is really a Dragon and Gero a Toad, thus are weakened by the cold. When they accompany him to watch Polar Peak being melted Pinocchio takes the opportunity to grab Dragonaro's orb and use it to turn the Dragon and Toad into ice, defeating them and restoring the transformed humans to normal, though he accidentally drops the orb before he can use it further. The Princess presents Pinocchio with a box of jewels as a token of her gratitude and has a giant falcon carry him back to the desert.
37	"Filthy Rich" "Warui Yume wa Sabaku ni Sutero!" (悪い夢は砂漠にすてろ! (Throw Bad Dreams Into the Desert!))	September 12, 1972
While traveling through the desert Pinocchio is picked up by a giant vulture, who quickly drops him after realising he isn't edible, and eventually arrives at a tent thirsty and exhausted, there he uses one of the diamonds he was given to buy water and a camel to take him to the nearest city (along with a large number of gold coins as change). Once in the city he finds a hotel to stay in where he meets a baby vulture who was captured from the desert and offers to teach Pinocchio how to behave like a rich man in exchange for his freedom. However while following the vulture's vague advise the puppet behaves badly; acting smug with others, embarrassing his servants and hangers-on for his own amusement, buying a house that was going to be used as an orphanage just as the transaction was about to be completed, ignoring the cricket's warning about the dangers of his new lifestyle, putting off his promise to set the vulture free, and refusing to speak with a traveling carpenter who comes to his house (not realising it's his father). However, Sneeroff soon finds Pinocchio's house and breaks into it to steal his diamonds, in the resulting ruckus the house catches fire and Sneeroff escapes with the diamonds, while Pinocchio panics and ends up leaving the baby vulture behind when he flees the burning house. Elsewhere Geppetto sees the house burning, upon overhearing two men talking about the owner he realises that it's Pinocchio and runs to save him. Meanwhile, Pinocchio has escaped the fire but finds that his former servants will no longer obey him and the orphans from before throw rocks at him; realising how badly he's behaved and that nobody in the city genuinely cares about him he begins to call for his father who hears and runs to him. However their reunion is cut off by the giant vulture from before who was the father of the baby vulture Pinocchio met and drops the puppet down a mountain, hoping to destroy him in retaliation for letting his child die.
38	"You Must be Brave, Pinocchio!" "Sākasu Ichiza wa Mō Iyada" (サーカス一座はもういやだ (I Don't Want To Be In The Circus Anymore))	September 19, 1972
After being dropped by the vulture Pinocchio is discovered by a Chimpanzee named Dobo who reattaches his leg and guides him out of the mountains, during the trip Dobo reveals that he admires humans and wants to live like them, though he's never met on in person. Meanwhile, Geppetto and Charlie have been searching for the puppet and stop in a city to try to sell some carvings to pay their way when they find a poster advertising Sneeroff's circus and decide to investigate, despite Pinocchio not being on the poster. That night Pinocchio and Dobo reach the same town and see the poster, Dobo is excited by the prospect of being an entertainer and wants to join the carnival despite his friend's warning him that Sneeroff is not to be trusted. Geppetto and Charlie arrive at the carnival where Sneeroff lies that Pinocchio is touring with him, but away on an errand, and has him wait in a wagon, shortly after Pinocchio and Dobo arrive and Dobo once again ignores his friend's warnings and is captured by Sneeroff as a result and locked in a trunk. The next morning Pinocchio is troubled by what happened to Dobo and Cricket urges him to go rescue his friend who is going be loaded onto a ship sailing to Europe, Charlie meets Dobo and after finding out that he was with Pinocchio tracks him down and leads him to the ship. When they aren't able to free Dobo they plan to hide Pinocchio in Sneeroff's personal trunk so that they can steal the key when he's asleep, Sneeroff wakes up when Charlie retrieves the key but they still manage to rescue Dobo who in turn save Pinocchio when he's cornered by Doro. After his adventure Dobo decides he wants to return home to the jungle and the two friends part ways, Pinocchio goes on to find his father, but the ship has already set sail and he isn't able to swim fast enough to catch up to the ship.
39	"Over the Sea in a Balloon" "Tobe! Kikyū Furusato e" (飛べ!気球 ふるさとへ (Fly! Blimp To Our Home Town))	September 26, 1972
While searching for a ship that will take him to Europe Pinocchio meets a retired lion hunting dog named Debbo who wants to return to his home in Spain and a young man named Mohammad to is planning to fly a hot air balloon to Spain with his parrot Kiki. Pinocchio helps Mohammad prepare for the voyage and rescues Debbo when he collapses, Mohammad explains that it's difficult for Debbo to survive on his own, but he's too proud to admit he needs help, thus the two invite him to accompany them to Europe. While the first day of travel goes smoothly they drop too close to the water during the night and the morning after are picked up by a water cyclone that carries them above the clouds where the air is too thin to breathe, leaving Pinocchio to adjust the balloon so it will lower. Later the balloon is damaged by a pair of seagulls after Kiki insults them and begins flying dangerously low, even after the hole is repaired and the bags are thrown overboard, leaving the group to draw lots over who will have to risk jumping off the balloon until it can rise again; Kiki ends up drawing the shortest straw, but refuses to leave and perches atop the balloon. Fortunately the group spots a piece of the ship that was destroyed by the cyclone, Debbo volunteers to wait on the plank and once the balloon begins rising again Mohammad and Pinocchio try to throw the line to him, but Kiki flies off of the balloon which causes it to rise too high up. Pinocchio tries tying himself to the rope and grabbing Debbo, but the line is too short; Debbo then tells Pinocchio and Mohammad to carry on ahead, assuring Pinocchio that he will be fine and that he's certain the puppet has the courage needed to carry on and find his father. After promising to sail to find him the next day the two realise they're close to Spain, close enough that Debbo will likely end up there before the night.
40	"Down With Sneeroff!" "Hi-Gui Oyakata o Yattsukero" (火食い親方をやっつけろ (Let's Take Down The Fire Eater))	October 3, 1972
Geppetto has been doing odd jobs for Sneeroff's circus so that Pinocchio will be able to find him, despite being shocked by the neglectful way the circus is managed, however he ends up being fired when Sneeroff and the animals trip over a bucket of water he left out; Geppetto leaves without protest, but asks that Sneeroff tell Pinocchio to meet him in the village if he shows up. Shortly afterwards he does find the circus, but Sneeroff lies that he doesn't know where Geppetto went in order to keep him to perform and convinces Pinocchio to sign a contract to perform in his circus, despite Cricket's warnings, with the promise that he'll be taken care of and his father will find him easily. However the circus is shut down after the first show when all the animals are sick after having been forced to perform wearing wet costumes, now the police warn Sneeroff that the animals must be in good condition and cared for because otherwise Sneeroff will risk prison and Pinocchio works taking care of the animals, collapsing from exhaustion as a result, and soon the animals recover and the circus can open again. Though Pinocchio does not realise how poorly the animals are treated until they explain why they're dreading the re-opening and he sees Sneeroff forcing them to perform a trick with a flaming hoop, which all the animals are afraid to do. When Sneeroff tells Pinocchio that his offer to do the trick instead is not enough, he asks to work alone with the animals to get them to do it; though the animals believe he's betrayed them, Pinocchio explains his plan to stop Sneeroff by sabotaging the performance. During the re-opening Pinocchio and the animals cause the tent to catch fire and collapse, which Sneeroff is held responsible and arrested for Cruelty to animals and the animals are all put on ships to be returned to their homelands. As they bid the animals farewell, Jack and Willie confess that they knew where Geppetto went the entire time, but didn't tell him because they knew if he left nobody would look after them, leaving Pinocchio feeling depressed to the point Cricket isn't able to console him. The Oak Fairy appears and reminds Pinocchio of the good he's done for the animals, and uses her magic to give him a place to sleep for the night before he returns home to his father the next day
41	"The Evil Spirit" "Tachiagare Ōki Majin" (立ち上がれ大木魔神(Stand Up, Great Tree Gods))	October 10, 1972
Pinocchio returns home only to find the house abandoned, while searching the house he finds Nora who explains that Geppetto has been traveling in search of him and that he was there recently and left to continue his search, much to Pinocchio's frustration and disappointment, nevertheless he sets off after his father. Meanwhile, a war is about to break out nearby and the local lord plans to have a nearby forest of Cedar trees cleared to be used to make warships, despite the villagers' protests that the trees prevent landslides and that the forest is protected by a large tree containing an evil spirit. That night Pinocchio stops to rest in the forest where the trees implore him to try to save them as they don't want to be used for war, the puppet refuses saying that he needs to continue searching for his father and that the other humans won't listen to him anyway, though the trees remind him that even if he were to become human his Mother will always be an Oak tree, thus he has a responsibility to try to help them. He runs into a cabin to sleep, but is later attacked by carpenter ants, the Oak Fairy saves him but explains that he behaved badly and needs to develop compassion, which he sets to work doing that night. The next day he tries to speak with the local lord on behalf of the trees but fails, and instead plans to drive the soldiers away from the mountain by having the trees drop some of their old branches, though this plan buys them another day more is needed to save the trees. Pinocchio becomes frustrated that the spirit tree won't help, even though he's supposed be their guardian, but soon realises that the tree is dehydrated from being too far from the river and, together with Jack and Willie, sets to work making a water wheel to revive it. The water wheel breaks under the strain but they succeed in reviving the tree who fights off the soldiers (though the English dub omits a scene where the spirit tree catches fire along with part of the forest). Unfortunately the army imprisons Geppetto, who they've learnt carved Pinocchio, and plan to send him to Devil Island as a sorcerer, while Pinocchio is depressed over how things turned out the Oak Fairy lets him know that she's proud of what he did but that he is of no help to his father if he just sits there feeling sorry for himself. The next day Pinocchio and his friends see Geppetto being led out of town and the puppet resolves to free his father before he can be sent to Devil Island.
42	"Dream Man" "Warui Yume no Sei yo Sayōnara" (悪い夢の精よさようなら (Goodbye Bad Dream Sprite))	October 17, 1972
When the cabin he's taking shelter in is raided by soldiers, Pinocchio is helped by and old farmer and his granddaughter, Nina, who recognise him and hide him from the army; unfortunately, the old farmer is imprisoned for helping Pinocchio, despite him not being found in the house. When Nina blames him for her grandfather's arrest he offers to turn himself in the next morning in exchange for the farmer's freedom, however that night he's visited by the Dream Man who encourages him to leave to protect himself by showing him a nightmare of him being burnt which causes him to run away the next morning. While he's hiding in a cave the Dream Man tells him should give up rescuing his father by showing him a nightmare of the two of them being attacked by monsters on Devils Island, which prevents him from attempting to rescue Geppetto when Jack and Willie tell him his whereabouts. While trying to hide he finds Nina and her grandfather, who was released from prison unharmed, Pinocchio apologises to them for running away and explains about his nightmare. Though Nina is still angry she forgives him and mentions her own nightmare, realising that none of the dreams he saw were real he goes to rescue his father, only to find that he's already been moved to another prison. Angered at having missed his chance due to the nightmares he confronts the Dream Man, accidentally knocking him into the light and making him melt away. Free of his nightmares Pinocchio's determination to save his father is renewed.
43	"The Fortress of Doom" "Shi no Toride o Uchiyabure" (死の砦を打ち破れ (Infiltrate the Fortress of Death))	October 24, 1972
Charlie sees Geppetto being taken to the fortress of doom and tells Pinocchio, Jack and, Willie, while they try to think of a way to get inside they see a merchant wagon pull up to the drawbridge and climb inside where they find that the goods being sold are faulty. The merchant catches them and ties up Jack and Willie to be pelted and dyed to look like mink later on and begrudgingly allows his son Mario to keep Pinocchio as a toy, neither realising he's alive until he reveals his secret to Mario after the boy's father leaves. Mario asks Pinocchio to tell him of his life's story until then; although he claims not to understand what gain there is in Pinocchio rescuing his father purely out of love, he gives him a guard uniform from the wagon and allows Jack and Willie to be set free. Charlie has manages to find the cell where a disheartened Geppetto is being held while Pinocchio gets another guard to tell him where his father is being held. Elsewhere Mario's father has completed his transaction with the commander and learns of the reward being offered for Pinocchio, however when he returns to the wagon he finds that the puppet and his friends have left and becomes furious when his son tells him that he freed them out of kindness. Pinocchio and his friends find Charlie who helps them to find Geppetto, though they are unable to free him, meanwhile the commander discovers the goods he purchased are inedible and has both Mario and his father captured to be sent to devil island as well until Mario tells him that he's seen the puppet. Mario finds Pinocchio and plans to turn him in to save his father, but upon hearing that his friend cares more about saving his own father than keeping away from the soldiers trying to burn him he refuses to betray him and tells his father that he no longer wants to follow his dishonest example and that they should find another way to escape. The group ends up being cornered by the soldiers who are holding Mario's father at gunpoint and Mario pushes his new friends into the moat to swim away and rescues his father, telling the soldiers that they are the evil ones before being shot and falling into the moat. Pinocchio bring him to shore where he wakes up and his father vows to become an honest businessman after learning from the events of the night, the drunken guard from earlier shows up and tells the group that Geppetto is being transported through the mountains.
44	"A Freezing Snowstorm" "Boku o Moyashite" (ぼくを燃やして!(Burn Me!))	October 31, 1972
Pinocchio and his friends wander into a small town and decide to listen to the sermon being given at the church where the preacher speaks about the important of looking after those weaker than yourself and of sacrifice. Afterwards he steps in when he believes a group of children are bullying a little girl, only to find out that they were excluding her for her own safety as they were planning to travel through the mountains and offer to let Pinocchio travel with them if he watches the little girl, Nina. However, Nina treats Pinocchio as poorly as she treats her own doll and the group abandons him when a bear shows up, after the bear tells him to stand up for himself and sends him away a blizzard starts and he takes shelter in a cabin. Shortly after he builds a fire in the fireplace the other children find the cabin and join him, however eventually the wood from the table and chair run out and with the blizzard no wood they could find outside would be dry enough to burn. Though the children joke about burning the puppet, when Nina begins to suffer from hypothermia he remembers the preachers words about the importance of sacrifice and tries to throw himself into the fireplace to save the other children. However Nina stops him and the two of them keep warm by dancing, the other children join in and they survive the night until the children's parents find them; however when one of the boys takes credit for saving everyone Pinocchio becomes frustrated with the way he's treated like a toy. Just then Nina shows up, remembering how he saved her and, having learnt an important lesson about taking care of things, plans to repair her doll and has told her parents the truth of what happened with the family seeing him on his way.
45	"Avalanche!" "Yuki-onna yo Shizuka ni Nemure" (雪女よ 静かに眠れ (Snow Woman, Sleep Peacefully))	November 7, 1972
While Geppetto is being transported to the docks a snow storm strikes and forces the soldiers to stop in a small village; Pinocchio, Jack, and Willie all decide to stop in the same village, though the puppet has become discouraged until some trees help to motivate him. However the snow storm separates Pinocchio from his friends and brings him to the Snow Witch who is angry with the villagers for melting her snow with a hot spring last year, which her twin nieces Alice and Tilly explain upset the natural balance; the Snow Witch then decides to use Pinocchio to get revenge despite his protests that he's not a member of the village. Meanwhile, Jack and Willie are brought closer to the village by the snowstorm and reunite with Charlie, who has just witnessed the mayor paying the commander to take a local couple the Devil Island along with Geppetto due to avalanches occurring during both the birth and first birthday of the couple's twin daughters that destroyed half the village but left the family's home unharmed, which resulted in the girls being taken from their parents and abandoned in the mountains. Elsewhere, Pinocchio is still trying to get the Snow Witch to let him go and explains why he was there; his story resonates with the twins whose own parents were accused of sorcery and executed by the village, and who realise that Pinocchio was at least being truthful about being carved from wood, however the Snow Witch still resolves to bury the village in an avalanche and refuses the puppet's request that he be allowed to save his father first. AS the Snow Witch leaves the Oak Fairy appears and tells Pinocchio that he was being uncaring to only try to save his father and let the village be buried, that the Snow Witch is acting out of anger that her work isn't appreciated, and that help is on the way and he may be able to save everyone. The animals soon find him and dig him out of the snow, upon hearing about the couple Pinocchio realises they are Alice and Tilly's parents and when the witch appears again he tells the girls that their parents are still alive and that the witch had been lying to them. This convinces the girls to at least check to see if their parents are there and the Snow Witch attempts to create a storm to stop them, however Pinocchio grabs her arm to stop the storm and allow the girls to escape, and causes her to turn her wrath on him. However the wind from the storm causes a small fire to spark among the dry trees, Pinocchio guesses that the Witch is afraid of heat and holds her off while the twins sneak into the village and reunite with their parents, the girls realise another avalanche is coming and warn the villagers who evacuate, except for their parents who they return to free. The Witch rides her avalanche down the mountain, destroying both the village and the trees, and tells the girls to come to her side, however they refuse to leave their parents to die and their parents try to protect them; ultimately Pinocchio is able to stop her by telling her that she's had her revenge and is about to harm the girls. Unable to harm the girls the Snow Witch stops her avalanche and fades away, and the family thanks Pinocchio for bringing them together before seeing him and his friends on their way.
46	"Gunner" "Shōkin Kasegi o Opparae" (賞金稼ぎをおっぱらえ (Chase Away The Bounty Hunter))	November 14, 1972
After a failed attempt to rescue Geppetto, Pinocchio and his friends are captured by a bounty hunter after the reward being offered for the puppet. On their way to the army an avalanche comes and injures the man, despite the protests of the three animals, Pinocchio can't bring himself to leave the man to the elements and brings him to see the Doctor in the nearby town. While the Doctor is initially reluctant to let anyone into his home, he eventually agrees to treat the bounty hunter and allow the group to spend the night. Over the evening the Doctor bonds with Pinocchio, refusing the bounty hunter's offer of paying with a share of the reward, showing him the medicine he's been developing and telling him about his past; the Doctor's hatred of humanity is due to losing his own son a few years ago when nobody, including Mr. Goldman the wealthiest man, in town with a child the same age, would help him to buy the medicine that could save him. Just then the man in question comes in begging the Doctor to save his daughter, who is gravely ill. The Doctor initially refuses to, but relents when Pinocchio tells him how deplorable it would be to allow the girl to die when he knows for certain he'd be able to save her. The next day the girl has fully recovered and sees the puppet and his friends off along with her father, the Doctor and the bounty hunter, the latter of which gives him a map of the mountain to repay his kindness the day before.
47	"How Many Pinocchio's Are There" "Ki wa Min'na Boku no Nakama" (木はみんなぼくの仲間 (The Trees Are All My Allies))	November 21, 1972
Pinocchio, Jack, and Willie arrive in the town that's the final stop before the ship to devil island to try to free Geppetto; an old man give them directions to the castle of doom, where Geppetto is being held, but becomes frustrated with their dismissive reaction when they knock over a potted plant. When they reach the prison and attempt to sneak in they're noticed by the guards, but manage to escape to an ancient shrine in the forest which is guarded by stone statues, however the guard finds them and captures Pinocchio. That night the guard tells Geppetto that Pinocchio is imprisoned too and will be executed, after the guard tells the puppet what will become of him and his father and beats him, Pinocchio becomes discouraged and frustrated that no matter how he tries to do the right thing, everyone else seems to come out ahead of him. Just then the Oak Fairy appears and assures him that he is loved and will survive, and advises him to never stop trying to improve himself. After she leaves Charlie shows up, but he's unsuccessful in freeing Pinocchio and the guards take him to be executed by burning at the stake, with Geppetto being forced the watch; however when the fire is started it instead is thrown back at the guards by the Oak Fairy's magic which also frees Pinocchio, while the soldiers hurry Geppetto to the ship to devil island. While the puppet and his friends hurry to save Geppetto they're forced to hide in the forest, when Pinocchio decides they shouldn't be the ones hiding since the soldiers are the ones in the wrong the owls offer to help by creating a diversion where it seems dozens of living puppets are running through the forest. Once they reach the shrine with the stone statues the soldiers catch up to them again but the statues come to life and hold the soldiers off. The next day Geppetto is being transported to the docks while Pinocchio and his friends stop for a drink of water and the remaining soldiers catch up to them again, this time being stopped by the potted plant which grows and tangles the soldiers in its vines (which prompts the friends to thank the plant and apologise for knocking it over earlier). Finally they're able to cross a suspension bridge to the side Geppetto is on and the bridge collapses just as they finish crossing it, which helps reassure Pinocchio that he's being watched over and is on the right path as he goes to save his father.
48	"Fury of the Sea Devil" "Umi Maō no Ikari ni Idome" (海魔王の怒りにいどめ (Challenging The Wrath Of The Sea Lord))	November 28, 1972
Pinocchio and his friends are watching the ship taking Geppetto to devil island being loaded and manages to sneak aboard by having Pinocchio disguise himself as a crew member and smuggle Jack and Willie aboard in a bag, but the three end up being trapped below the deck where they eventually reunite with Charlie, who has already explored the entire ship and takes Pinocchio to where his father is being held. On the deck they meet a girl named Gina, who helps them hide from the crew on the way to see Geppetto. After seeing where the cell is Pinocchio and Charlie plan to free Geppetto by enlisting the help of the other mice on the ship to create a diversion to lure away the guards and chew a hole through the deck, however before he can be freed a giant octopus appears and the captain offers Gina as a human sacrifice in exchange for safe passage. Unable to stand watching the girl being killed, Pinocchio rescues Gina which causes the sea monster to freeze the water and air around the ship in retaliation, the puppet manages to fight off the octopus using the dynamite that had been stored in the hold and seems to have defeated the monster when the ice melts. However, the monster makes a final attempt to destroy the ship using a barrier of magical fire, which prompts the captain to try to throw both Gina and Geppetto overboard to appease the monster and Pinocchio proposes to the monster to fight him one-on-one instead, asking the Oak Fairy for her help before jumping off the top of the mast. The Oak Fairy appears and uses her magic to help Pinocchio defeat the monster, however this causes a violent storm which destroys the ship; the puppet wakes up, spots Gina and his father holding onto a piece of driftwood and begins swimming to them.
49	"Devil Island" "Jigokujima wa Shindeiru" (地獄島は死んでいる (Hell Island Is Dying))	December 5, 1972
After defeating the sea monster Pinocchio, Gina, and Geppetto are all on a small raft made from part of the ship and Geppetto is sick with a high fever. While taking care of the old man Gina comments how lucky Pinocchio is to have a father, as Gina has no family at all, and Pinocchio offers to let her be part of their family which she gladly accepts, regardless of whether or not he becomes human, and asks him to tell her of his life so far; when he finishes recounting how the Oak Fairy promised to one day make him human he's surprised to find that Gina believes him and supports his dream. The next day they reach a deserted island and the two children bring Geppetto to a cave where Gina stays to look after him while Pinocchio goes to look for supplies, during his search he finds that the island is a large volcano inhabited by a fire monster who tells him that they are on devil island. Pinocchio is disheartened that they've ended up in the very place they had been trying to avoid until Gina comes to look for him, she's also figured out where they are but they decide not to tell Geppetto and go off to find drinking water to give to him. Gina suggests they try digging for water and Pinocchio manages to uncover a small spring by using his leg to dig, together they bring some water back to Geppetto and revive him, the two children also catch some shell fish to eat and plan to gather the supplies they can and sail home as soon as possible. However the fire monster sets off another volcanic eruption and destroys their raft.
50	"The Fire Monster" "Yomigaere Jigokujima" (よみがえれ地獄島 (Resurrecting Hell Island))	December 12, 1972
Following the eruption Geppetto relapses without food and water while Gina begins losing hope they'll ever escape the island and Pinocchio struggles to keep his optimism as he feels it's his fault this has happened; the Oak Fairy appears and assures him that he's not to blame and reminds him that, as the only one who doesn't need to eat or drink, he can save the others as long as he doesn't give up. With his determination renewed he once again digs for water, though he isn't able to find another spring, a rain storm starts and he's able to gather water. Though he's unsuccessful finding shellfish he notices a large egg on the beach, however a mother sea turtle begs him not to cook it as it's her only surviving egg which convinces the puppet to return it; instead he tries catching fish under water (by carrying a rock to weigh himself down) which is also unsuccessful, but he manages to find several clams and a cracker barrel. Unfortunately an octopus appears and ties the puppet up for trespassing, however the mother turtle overhears and repays his earlier kindness by freeing him and bringing him to the surface along with the barrel, though even after eating Geppetto is still weak and doubts he'll be able to survive much longer; when the puppet finds the barrel is full of dynamite he begins using it to search for water and uncovers a patch of soil which he uses to make a forest of coral to raise his father's spirits. However the flame monster sets off another eruption and Pinocchio leaves to confront it, upon learning the eruption is retaliation for the dynamite, Pinocchio tells the monster that he was the only one responsible for the blasting and asks that only he be punished as long as Geppetto and Gina are spared and able to return home. Pinocchio's courage and willingness to sacrifice himself to save his loved ones protects him from the monster's attack and in recognition of actions the monster transforms the island into a paradise where Geppetto and Gina quickly recover. Though they are happy to live on the island, the Oak Fairy urges Pinocchio to return home as there is an important task waiting for him, although they would still be in danger from the soldiers the Oak Fairy urges him not to let the fear of others keep him from fulfilling his dream, and the family sets sail for home. On their way they reunite with Jack, Willie and Charlie, and the two children think of a future where they're both able to grow up as the near the mainland.
51	"A Sad Christmas Eve" "Kanashī Ibu ni Kane ga Naru" (悲しいイブに鐘がなる (Bells Are Ringing On A Sad Eve))	December 19, 1972
Everyone arrives in a village near home shortly before Christmas, though they have no money for a celebration and Pinocchio is nearly captured, he remains optimistic that he will become human soon. However Gina collapses from a high fever and Pinocchio goes to find something to help, while searching he sees the children preparing to go caroling and meets a girl who uses a wheelchair; the girl agrees to lend him her veil to go caroling and receive a present from the minister upon hearing that he wants to find something to help his sick friend, though she asks that he return it afterwards. Pinocchio is able to receive a gift while caroling, which he plans to sell to buy medicine, Jack and Willie also find veils and manage to receive fruit, however all three of them lose their gifts when a soldier finds them. The two animals return to the building they'd been hiding in while Pinocchio goes to return the veil and sees the soldiers burning toys in an effort to kill him. Meanwhile, the local commander is taking the dolls belonging to the girl Pinocchio met earlier, despite the minister begging that she be allowed to keep them as she cannot play with the other children and they are her only playmates, when Pinocchio arrives to return the veil he lets himself be captured in exchange for the girl's dolls; however the girl cannot bear to see her first real friend be harmed and moves to save him, realising that she's standing and walking by herself. Seeing the miracle occur and the minister pray for Pinocchio's safety unnerves the commander, causing him and his soldiers to flee, the puppet also runs to see Gina. As he leaves the girl also prays for his safety while the village children gang up on the soldiers in retaliation for destroying their toys
52	"Flowers in the Snow" "Boku no Yume wa Kagayaku Hoshi ni" (ぼくの夢は輝く星に (My Wish Is In The Shining Stars))	26 December 1972
Pinocchio tries to return to the cabin everyone is staying in, but upon over hearing them he can't bring himself to return without medicine for Gina and he decides to try again; when he goes to see the doctor he sees many other families asking for medicine to cure their sick children, but unable to afford it. Though he's tempted to steal the medicine and money from the town doctor, he decides it would be wrong to do so, and despairs that he won't be able to help Gina. As he wonders what to do a group of children find him and invite him to the home they share with other orphans where he's impressed by their camaraderie, and where he sees that one of them is gravely ill, prompting him to volunteer to journey into the mountains to find the alpine daisy used to make the medicine everyone needs. While he's climbing the mountain a tree saves him from falling and tells him where to find the flower before falling off the cliff itself. Later he falls in a chasm where ice begins to form on his body and he begins crying at how he's failed everyone, however his tears melt enough of the ice for him to rub his wrists together and melt the rest of the ice by lighting himself on fire, allowing him to climb out of the chasm before collapsing in the snow. When he awakens he realises that he's found the alpine daisy and with it he's able to cure all of the sick children. Later he's celebrating Christmas with the orphans, his family and his animal friends (including Cricket). However the soldiers show up and shoot Pinocchio, as he falls the Oak Fairy appears and saves his life by granting his wish and turning him into a human child. While everyone is happy that he's not only alive, but has finally gotten his wish, the Oak Fairy tells him that he will no longer be able to see her and assures him that he does not need her help anymore; asking him to remember what he has learnt so far and to make the most of her gift before fading away into the starry sky as Pinocchio bids farewell to his Mother.

== English dub movie ==
The movie begins in a similar manner to the series, with Pinocchio being carved by Geppetto from a fallen oak tree branch and given life by the tree's guardian fairy. The fairy also gives magic to Timothy, a cricket who has been living in the branch (and who, Like his Disney counterpart does in some places, narrates the film), that allows him to speak and act as Pinocchio's guardian. Though Geppetto is overjoyed by what's happened, Rudy the mouse living in his home, quickly becomes jealous of the puppet. On the way to school Pinocchio sees a traveling puppet show and is convinced by a classmate to skip class and sell his schoolbooks to see the puppet show, which Timothy advises him against, however the puppeteer soon appears at the pawn shop and buys him from the classmate in exchange for fare to see the puppet show. Saphano the puppeteer forces Pinocchio to perform in his show and Pinocchio worries that he will never see his father again. On the one night the other puppets advise him to escape. Though he is nearly caught when he tries to rescue the other puppets as well, he eventually manages to return home to his father.

Some days later Geppetto gives him a gold coin (though in the earlier shots it is clearly copper) to run errands with, Rudy speaks to Sly the Fox and Slick the Weasel who try to trick Pinocchio out of his coin by telling him of a magic tree that neither animals nor humans can uproot, but he may be able to retrieve since he is a marionette. Pinocchio successfully retrieves the small tree and follows the animals' instructions to plant the coin next to the tree, only for the animals to dig up the coin when he leaves to get some water, as he is caring for the tree the Oak Fairy appears and admonishes him for his disobedience. Later that night the tree matures rapidly and begins to grow gold coins which attract the attention of both the three animals and the towns people, the latter of which cuts down the tree in an effort to get more coins, and Pinocchio returns home and apologises to his father for losing the coin. Geppetto quickly forgives his son who boards up Rudy's mouse hole to keep him away from Slick and Sly.

On the next day, Pinocchio is on his way to school when he catches the attention of Lord Dominos, the owner of the land Geppetto's cottage is built on, who wants to adopt him as his heir and raises the land tax on the cottage when Geppetto refuses. To save his father Pinocchio allows himself to be adopted by Dominos, but quickly becomes used to his new life begins riding his horse recklessly and chasing after both the household staff and the villagers; Timothy tells him he has become spoiled and lost sight of what is truly important, but the younger puppet dismisses him. However, when he sees his real father in town the next day he realises what he is given up but is not sure how he can go back; the fairy appears and tries to help him to make the correct decision which results in her turning his nose into a tree branch, though it allows him to leave the castle as Lord Domino has him thrown out. As he tries to returning home he becomes more tree-like and is found by a man who digs him up, puts in a plant pot and has him sing for guests at a party. Having experienced cruelty he realises that his actions are wrong, but the fairy cannot return him to normal until he is performed an act of kindness. He is soon sold to an evil Captain who plans to sell him and some kidnapped children across the sea, however the ship sails into a storm and Pinocchio rescues the other children by allowing them to hold onto him and stay afloat until a rescue boat picks them up. Having performed a selfless act, the fairy is able to use her magic to restore him to normal and guide him home.

One day when Pinocchio goes out to play Saphano finds and abducts him to force him to perform in his show again, he also catches Slick and Sly in a trap and the puppet saves them from being cooked by suggesting they perform as trained animals. Though the two are grateful Pinocchio is depressed to have been taken prisoner and away from his father again, in the meanwhile Geppetto and a reluctant Rudy go off in search of him. Saphano has Pinocchio perform as a clown alongside the animals and soon grows the act from the three of them performing on street corners to an entire circus, though he mistreats the animals and will not let them out of their cages, prompting the animals to consider going on strike. When Pinocchio goes to speak with him Saphano says he will only let them out if Pinocchio works well (though Timothy points out it is likely a lie) and then presses him to sign a contract that will make them business partners. The next day Saphano tries to make the animals perform a new act where they jump through a flaming hoop, but they are all too afraid to; Pinocchio offers to try teaching them instead, citing that they are now business partners, but instead he tells the animals that he has a plan to free them. Later when they are performing they sabotage the act, causing the tent to catch fire and collapse and Saphano to be arrested, when Pinocchio is seeing about the animals who were taken from overseas and being returned home Slick and Sly tell him that they were not planning to return home along with him and that he does not need them anyway and he returns home to Geppetto.

When the carnival is in town Pinocchio sneaks into a tent advertising Gloria the Mermaid and realises that she is being held against her will, as the carnival is leaving he throws a rock at Gloria's tank, breaking it open and allowing her to escape. He helps her hide from captain Rodgers, the owner of the carnival, and she tells him that she had been captured by pirates when she swam too far from Mermaid Island. They manage to evade Captain Rodgers by swimming too deep to be seen, and though they are nearly caught when Gloria swims closer to the surface too soon, they eventually make it to Mermaid Island where Gloria is reunited with her Grandmother. Pinocchio wants to stay with Gloria, but cannot as he is not a creature of the sea and if he is to stay he can never see his father again, unfortunately Gloria cannot leave either and Pinocchio leaves heartbroken that he will not be able to see his friend again.

After he returns home Geppetto buys him a new set of clothes to celebrate and Pinocchio meets a girl named Mirelle while playing and is instantly smitten, however she does not realise he is a puppet as his clothing covers his doll joints. After he helps her hide from her governess, who never lets her play outside, Mirelle meets Geppetto and introduces the two to her parents who turn out to be millionaires and allow Pinocchio to stay for a while after hearing about how unhappy she has been. As they play together the two children become close friends, though despite a close call and Timothy urging Pinocchio to tell her the truth, Mirelle never finds out that Pinocchio is a puppet. After Mirelle's birthday party she suggests that the two of them get married when they grow up and Timothy once again tells Pinocchio that hiding his true nature is not fair to her, especially now that she is thinking of when they grow up, which Pinocchio can not do. Later that night he realises the Cricket was right and wishes he could become human, the Fairy appears and also urges him to tell Mirelle the truth and makes his nose grow when he lies about having told her already, she returns it to normal when he promises to tell Mirelle the next day and leave Pinocchio with the advice that true love cannot exist without honesty. However the next day he still cannot bring himself to reveal his secret and instead claims that he has to go visit his father, Mirelle follows him and he finally tells her the truth but that he might become human one day and if he does he will return to her; though both children are heartbroken, their respective fathers believe that one day Pinocchio really will become human and they will be reunited.

Soon it is Christmas and both Pinocchio and Geppetto are looking forward to the party, however the evil Colonel Meanio has declared war on Christmas and instructed his soldiers to find and destroy every toy in the village. One of the soldiers goes after Pinocchio, considering a living puppet to be a toy, but Slick and Sly bite him allowing Pinocchio to escape. After hearing of the puppet's existence the Colonel becomes determined to destroy him and has the toys collected thus far burnt; while in hiding Pinocchio meets the orphan children who have been rescuing dolls to hold a secret Christmas party and offer him shelter from the soldiers. However, one of the girls is sick and constantly worsening with the only cure being a herb found on Devil's Mountain, which none of them have been able to climb. Pinocchio offers to retrieve the herb and with the help of a tree who saves him from falling manages to climb the mountain, find the herb and cure the girl. Later Pinocchio is enjoying a secret Christmas party with his father and both his animal and human friends, including Mirelle who has come to see him, however the Colonel and his men show up and shoot him. The Oak Fairy then appears and saves him by transforming him into a human child, she then leaves asking that he make the most of the gift she is given him before disappearing into the night sky, Timothy then tells that Pinocchio and Geppetto lived happily ever after and that Timothy himself decided to continue helping other children, including those who were born human.

== Music ==
Pinocchio: The Series uses several pieces of theme music for different adaptations. The original Japanese opening is "Kashi no Ki Mokku (樫の木モック)" which is sung by Kumiko Onoki. The original Japanese ending theme is "Boku wa kanashii ki-no ningyou (I'm A Sad Wooden Puppet)" which is sung by Moon Drops. Whereas the intro carries an upbeat, "friendly" kids tune, the ending reflects the overall mood of the series.

The English adaptation has two songs, one for the mini movie made from the series, and the other for the actual 52-episode series that aired on HBO. These songs were "Whoa, Oh, Pinocchio" sung by Bullets for the movie, and "It's Pinocchio" produced by Saban.

In the Saban version, Shuki Levy reused a lot of the music from the animated TV special The Adventures of Ronald McDonald: McTreasure Island produced by DIC Entertainment, and various music tracks made for the show have the theme song's melody.

== Home media ==
Jetix has licensed DVDs of the Saban version across Europe, particularly in the UK, Maximum Entertainment LTD. Jetix has released two DVD volumes, re-released under the titles The Magical World of Pinocchio and The Adventures of Pinocchio as they have the usual censorship (e.g. the cricket's death is not shown).

The Jim Terry compilation film was initially released by Video Gems in 1984, and MasterVision (Harmony Gold's UK counterpart) under its Kids Cartoon Collection label in 1987. It was also released in VHS by Celebrity Home Entertainment (under its Just for Kids label) and GoodTimes Home Video, under its Kids Klassics Home Video division. In the UK, it was also released by Pickwick Video. A remastered re-release was licensed by Liberty International Publishing and released by Warner Home Video (under its Family Entertainment label) on DVD and VHS, in the UK and the United States. Michael Stailey of Dvdverdict.com criticized it for its poor animation and voice acting, as well as its audiovisual transfer to a 1.33:1 full frame and Dolby 5.1 soundtrack.

The original Japanese version had 20 episodes released on 10 VHS tapes in the late 1990s. In addition, 9 episodes were released on three selection DVDs with Volume 1 containing the first three episodes, Volume 2 containing episodes 10, 23, and 28, and Volume 3 containing episodes 36, 44, and 52. The full series was released on Blu-Ray in 2020 as part of the Anime Memories Library, remastered in 1080p HD.

Along with other Saban Entertainment shows and anime, Saban's The Adventures of Pinocchio was previously owned by The Walt Disney Company, through Saban International/BVS International, Jetix/Fox Kids and Buena Vista International Television.

The Saban dub was released on 4 VHS volumes in the US by Video Treasures in 1991, and the full series on DVD by Divisa Home Video in Spain in 2006.

== In popular culture ==
- The Tatsunoko version of Pinocchio can be seen in a 2019 episode of the Brazilian animated series Zuzubaland (Portuguese: Zuzubalândia).
- In the later work of Tatsunoko, Yatterman, episode 41 is a reference to Kashi No Ki Mokku.
