= Ojamanga Yamada-kun =

Japanese manga series

- Ojamanga Yamada-kun poster

おじゃまんが山田くん
- Genre: Comedy, Slice of life story
- Manga
- Written by: Hisaichi Ishii
- Original run: 1979 – 1982
- Anime television series
- Directed by: Hiromitsu Furukawa
- Written by: Hiroshi Kaneko; Tamiko Baba; Tomoko Kanahara
- Studio: Tsuchida Production; Visual 80
- Original network: FNS (Fuji TV)
- Original run: September 28, 1980 – October 10, 1982
- Episodes: 101 (303 segments)
- Anime film
- Directed by: Hiromitsu Furukawa
- Produced by: Tadami Watanabe
- Written by: Hiroshi Kaneko; Tamiko Baba; Tomoko Kanahara
- Released: March 14, 1981

Ojamanga Yamada-kun (おじゃまんが山田くん) is a manga series by Hisaichi Ishii.

== Anime ==
=== TV series ===
A 101-episode (103 if counting the two repeat episodes) anime television series was produced for the Fuji TV network and aired from 28 September 1980 to 10 October 1982 with each episode containing 3 7-minute stories. The series aired on Sunday nights from 7:00 to 7:30.

==== Staff ====
- Director: Hiromitsu Furukawa
- Planning: Hiro Akieda
- Producer: Tadami Watanabe
- Executive Producer: Kōichi Sasaki
- Chief Director: Hiroyoshi Mitsunobu
- Animation Director: Hiroshi Kanazawa
- Screenplay: Hiroshi Kaneko, Tamiko Baba, Tomoko Kanahara
- Original Creator: Hisaichi Ishii
- Art Director: Mariko Kadono

==== Cast ====
- Yoshio Yamada: Columbia Top
- Yoshida: Yasushi Suzuki
- Noboru: Kenbō Kaminarimon
- Ine: Reiko Suzuki
- Minoru: Hiroko Maruyama
- Yoneo: Mitsuo Senda
- Yoneko: Emiko Yokoyama
- Shigeru: Junji Nishino
- Sanae: Akie Yasuda
- Fukuda: Yō Yoshimura

=== Film ===
An anime film produced by Nihon Herald Pictures was released into Herald Enterprise theaters on 14 March 1981.

==== Staff ====
- Director: Hiromitsu Furukawa
- Planning: Hiro Akieda
- Producer: Tadami Watanabe
- Executive Producer: Kōichi Sasaki
- Chief Director: Hiroyoshi Mitsunobu
- Animation Director: Hiroshi Kanazawa
- Screenplay: Hiroshi Kaneko, Tamiko Baba, Tomoko Kanahara
- Original Creator: Hisaichi Ishii
- Art Director: Mariko Kadono

==== Cast ====
- Yoshio Yamada: Columbia Top
- Yoshida: Yasushi Suzuki
- Noboru: Kenbō Kaminarimon
- Ine: Reiko Susuki
- Minoru: Yūko Maruyama
- Yoneo: Mitsuo Senda
- Yoneko: Emiko Yokoyama
