= Moero! Top Striker =

Japanese anime series

- Top Striker video game cover art, featuring Hikaru and Julian
- 燃えろ! トップストライカー
- Developed by: Yoshio Kuroda
- Directed by: Ryō Yasumura
- Music by: Junnosuke Yamamoto
- Opening theme: Dream Striker by Wakako Shimazaki
- Ending theme: Sutoraniēro ~kotokunibito~ by Wakako Shimazaki
- Country of origin: Japan
- Original language: Japanese
- No. of episodes: 49

Production
- Executive producer: Koichi Motohashi
- Producers: Shun'ichi Kosao; Shinsuke Kurabayashi (TV Tokyo)
- Production companies: TV Tokyo; Nippon Animation

Original release
- Network: TXN (TV Tokyo)
- Release: 10 October 1991 – 24 September 1992

Related
- Video game

Top Striker
- Publisher: Namco
- Platform: Family Computer
- Released: JP: October 22, 1992

Moero! Top Striker (燃えろ!トップストライカー, Moero! Toppu Sutoraikā; lit. 'Burn! Top Striker') is a Japanese anime television series. It was produced by Nippon Animation and broadcast for 49 episodes on TV Tokyo and its affiliates from 10 October 1991 to 24 September 1992.

The series tells the story of a boy named Yoshikawa Hikaru, who went to Genoa, Italy to study football at his father's request. He plays for the prestigious team, Sanpodestà Junior. One day, Hikaru's parents suddenly die in an airplane accident, and his aunt living in Japan is about to take him in, but Robson, a local doctor, notices his talent and he decides to stay in Italy. After being coached by Robson, Hikaru joins the weak team Columbus and participates in the Genoa Cup.

Although Hikaru loses to his former team, Sanpodestà Junior, in the Genoa Cup final and ends up as runner-up, he is selected to represent Genoa in the Italian Youth Soccer Tournament, and he is respected for bringing together his assertive teammates. Eventually, Robson suggests that a mixed team called "J-Wings" be formed, bringing together talented players from all over the world, and Hikaru expands his field of activity, participating in the European Tournament and the Junior Champions Cup with his former rivals.

== Overview ==
In the early 1990s, Italy's top football league, Serie A, attracted star players from around the world, including Dutch players Ruud Gullit, Marco van Basten, and Frank Rijkaard, German players Lothar Matthäus and Jürgen Klinsmann, and Brazilian player Careca. The 1990 FIFA World Cup was held the year before the series aired. This work depicts the growth of a Japanese boy who travels to Italy to study football, as he encounters and interacts with coaches and rivals. The protagonist's teammates are all foreigners, and the entire series is set in Europe.

The series was scheduled to air in France before its Japanese broadcast. At the request of the French broadcaster, the characters' appearances were not distorted, and their eyes and mouths were depicted small to create a realistic impression.

In South Korea, it was broadcast on SBS TV in 1993 under the title "Football King Shuttori" and became a more popular football anime than "Captain Tsubasa".

== Characters ==
=== Main characters ===
Hikaru Kikkawa
Voiced by: Kazue Ikura
A son of a diplomat, who has lived in many countries since he was a baby. He came to Genoa as an international student at the age of ten. Then he joined San Podesta Junior, but he remained a substitute. He lost his parents in a plane crash and was about to be taken over by his aunt, but was taken over by former famous player Albert Robson. He started out as a disciple of Robson, emerged as the ace of the street club "Columbus", and eventually became the captain of the multinational team "Jupiter Wings". He is weak at making a fuss, but he likes to fall in love and to dream.
Anna Liegi
Voiced by: Kumiko Nishihara
As assistant and a resident of Robson Clinic, she is a female football player, and displays her talent among male players. She does manage to get selected for the Italian women's national team, but fails due to injury during training. She has a masculine but caring character, and is like an elder sister to Hikaru.
Albert Robson
Voiced by: Banjō Ginga
Master of Hikaru, he is known as an ace striker of England Leopards in his active days. Born and raised in a rich family in England, he opened a clinic in Genoa after retiring from active duty. His belief is that "without being bound by national borders, people who share their thoughts should gather", after a compromise with his younger brother Charles Robson, he took over the manager of the Jupiter Wings.
M. Bertini
Voiced by: Yō Yoshimura, Kazuaki Fukuda
A cheerful man who is an acquaintance of Robson. He was originally a player scout and mediator.
Julian Ray
Voiced by: Rika Matsumoto
An international student who came from France, he belongs to San Podesta Junior and an ace striker of this team. Born in a noble family, he believes to play for the honor of his motherland. He sometimes has a sarcastic behavior and initially looked down on Hikaru. He was rejected from the French youth national team and joined Jupiter Wings at the invitation of Hikaru.
Catherine Ray
Voiced by: Chieko Honda
Julian's younger sister and Hikaru's girlfriend, she is studying abroad at a ballet school in Genoa, and she is a girl who dreams of prima donna. She believes that "the purpose of play is dream and enjoy", and her elder brother Julian sometimes advises her that "You are too optimistic". Finally, she was invited by the ballet team in Paris to leave from elder brother Julian and boyfriend Hikaru.
Cesare Gatti
Voiced by: Takumi Yamazaki
Initially, he was the captain of Gloria. He was born and raised in poverty and plebeian, and started playing football to get out of poverty and send money to his family. Therefore, he is short-tempered and despised Hikaru and Julian as carefree rich boys, but as he played against Hikaru and Julian, he recognized their power.

=== Teammates of Columbus ===
Roberto Concini
Voiced by: Tsutomu Kashiwakura
The former captain of Columbus, and a genuine Genoese. Among team mates of Columbus, he is not a poor player, but during his captainship, the condition of Columbus was worst. After Hikaru joined, he surrendered captainship to Hikaru and became Hikaru's most loyal servant. He has a girlfriend named Sophia at the ballet school, but he is a womanizer, and often makes fun of Hikaru on love affairs.
Lucas Rondi
Voiced by: Megumi Tano
The son of a circus family, he grew up in a family environment where he was forced to move due to entertainment reasons, and spent his infantage as if he had only ball friends. He rebelled against Roberto when he first joined Columbus, but Hikaru accepted his case and gradually became familiar with the team.
Giorgio Fornari
Voiced by: Chafūrin
A goalkeeper of Columbus. After losing the selection from the Genoa selection team, he rushed to support Hikaru and others.
Macaroni Giotti
Voiced by: Chie Satō
A defender of Columbus. In the late stage, he entered San Podesta Junior to challenge Hikaru.
Antonio Solozzo
Voiced by: Miki Narahashi

=== Players of San Podesta Junior ===
Mario Santis
Voiced by: Ai Orikasa
An old member of San Podesta Junior, and a Genoese. One who knows early stage of Julian and Hikaru's bad relationship, he tried to reconcile Julian and Hikaru. After Julian joined to Jupiter Wings, he took on the captain of San Podesta Junior and participated in the Junior Champions Cup.
Renzo Rotta
Voiced by: Masami Kikuchi
A striker of San Podesta Junior. In the early stage, he was Julian's regular replacement.
Coloni
Voiced by: Takumi Yamazaki
A goalkeeper of San Podesta Junior.
Renato
Voiced by: Isshin Chiba
A striker of San Podesta Junior. After Julian entered the Jupiter Wings, he became a replacement. A player raised by Mario, he lightly imitated Julian and Hikaru's special skills.
Carone
Voiced by: Shinya Ōtaki
The manager of San Podesta Junior. He later took over as the manager of the selection of Genoa.

=== Other players ===
Bruno Moricone
Voiced by: Nobuo Tobita
The captain of the street club Margherita where Hikaru first confronted. He has a short tempered personality.
Woltz
Voiced by: Toshihiko Nakajima
A German goalkeeper, he was recruited by Naples during the quarterfinal of the tournament in Italy.
Yann
Voiced by: Tomoyuki Dan
A former star of the Netherlands youth team. One of the most short-tempered character of this work, he is fired after decimating his team as he tried to toughen up his teammates.
Papan
Voiced by: Shizuka Kochi
Jupiter Wings
The most pretentious player in Jupiter Wings.

=== Students of the ballet school ===
Sofia Ruggiero
Voiced by: Ai Orikasa
Roberto's girlfriend.
Monica Rossi
Voiced by: Junko Asami
A ballet school student who is most in love with Hikaru.
Lisa Palmioli
Voiced by: Yuri Shiratori
A schoolmate of Catherine, Monica and Sophia.

== Video game ==
- Top Striker (22 October 1992, Famicom, published by Namco)
