= Yō Yoshimura =

Japanese voice actor

Yō Yoshimura (吉村 よう, Yoshimura Yō; July 10, 1954 – November 27, 1991) was a Japanese voice actor who was born in Kyoto Prefecture, Japan. As a youth, he was a member of a performing arts troupe. Yoshimura was diagnosed with subarachnoid hemorrhage in March 1990, and died on November 27, 1991, at 37 years old, from complications of the disease.

== Filmography ==
- Osu!! Karate Bu

== Television ==
=== Anime ===
- Aoi Blink (Satchi)
- F (manga) (Yasuda)
- Moero! Top Striker (unknown)
- Machine Robo: Revenge of Cronos (Magna Rock)
- Ojamanga Yamada-kun (Fukuda)
- Ranma ½ (Maomolin (1st voice) (later replaced by Masahiro Anzai after his death), Ebiten, Wu)
- Tsuide ni Tonchinkan (Nukesaku Aida)
- Matchless Raijin-Oh (Taidā)

=== OVA ===
- Capricorn (anime) (unknown)
- Matchless Raijin-Oh (Taidā)

=== Live action ===
- One, Two, Three, Mathematics (いちにのさんすう) (Yoshi)

=== Voice-overs ===
- The A-Team (unknown)
- Red Dawn (Robert Morris)
- Teenage Mutant Ninja Turtles II: The Secret of the Ooze (Donatello)
