= Robotan =

Japanese anime and manga series

ロボタン
- Genre: Comedy
- Created by: Kenji Morita
- Manga
- Written by: Kenji Morita
- Published by: Shōnen Gahōsha
- Magazine: Shōnen Gaho
- Original run: 1966 – 1968
- Volumes: 2
- Anime television series
- Directed by: Hiroshi Ono
- Produced by: Tsuyoshi Hata (early episodes); Isamu Hagi (later episodes)
- Written by: Tsuyoshi Danjo; Takashi Taka; Yu Aku
- Music by: Yasushi Kokura
- Studio: Puppe Production; A Production; Sun Production; Nakamura Production
- Original network: Fuji TV
- Original run: October 1st, 1966 – September 27th, 1968
- Episodes: 104
- Anime television series
- Directed by: Masaharu Okuwaki
- Music by: Reijiro Koroku
- Studio: Tokyo Movie Shinsha
- Original network: NNS (YTV)
- Original run: January 6th, 1986 – September 20th, 1986
- Episodes: 33

Robotan (ロボタン) is a Japanese anime and manga series created by Kenji Morita. The series revolves around household robot Robotan, who is created by a boy and lives with the family as a domestic servant and friend to the children. His good intentions don't always work out, and there are comical consequences. The original series was produced by Daiko Advertising. Production moved to Tokyo Movie Shinsha for the 20th-anniversary color remake New Robotan (1986) under director Masaharu Okuwaki.

== Plot ==
Robotan is a robot built by a school boy named Kan-chan. He has special abilities like "Robotan Copter", "Robotan Punch" etc. His rival is Botchi, a small kid who dislikes Robotan and tries to destroy him or make him a slave, but Robotan foils all his plans. Robotan has a crush on his teacher, Umi. He is very fond of bananas which gives him power. His male mentor Uminoyamais is also in love with Umi, which causes jealousy for Robotan.

== Media ==
=== Manga ===
Written and illustrated by Kenji Morita, the manga began serialization in the Shonen Gaho magazine in 1966. The manga was published simultaneously with the 1966 anime version after Morita was hired by Daiko Advertising to create a series similar to Obake no Q-Tarō.

=== 1966 anime ===
The 1966 anime version of Robotan was produced by Daiko Advertising and the animation was outsourced to four studios, all located in Osaka. The studios providing the animation were Puppe Production, A Production, Sun Production, and Nakamura Production, all of which would take turns producing the episodes. All the stories were handled at Daiko Advertising, which would then be sent the four studios. The film would then be sent back to Daiko for editing and dubbing work.

The series was aired on Fuji Television from October 4, 1966, to September 27, 1968, for 104 episodes. To this day, it's unknown how many episodes still survive. The films were thrown out by Daiko several years ago and ended up as collector's items.

=== 1986 anime ===
The 1986 anime color remake was produced by Daiko who contracted Tokyo Movie Shinsha to handle the production of it. It aired on Yomiuri Television from January 6 to September 22, 1986, for 33 episodes.

== Characters ==
- Robotan voiced by Hyosuke Kanbe (1966), Hiroko Maruyama (1986)
- Kan-chan voiced by Yoko Matsui (1966), Eiko Yamada (1986)
- Bocchi voiced by Hiromi Onoe (1966), Chika Sakamoto (1986)
- Kiiko voiced by Takako Nakamori (1966), Mayumi Tanaka (1986)

=== Opening themes ===
1966 series:

- Robotan no Uta (ロボタンの歌)

1986 series:

- I'm Robotan (ボクはロボタン)
