= Chōgattai Majutsu Robo Ginguiser =

Japanese anime television series

超合体魔術ロボ ギンガイザー (Chōgattai Majutsu Robo Gingaizā)
- Genre: Mecha
- Anime television series
- Directed by: Masami Anno
- Produced by: Akira Hatta
- Written by: Sōji Yoshikawa
- Music by: Seiji Yokoyama
- Studio: Nippon Animation; Ashi Productions
- Original network: ANN (ABC)
- Original run: April 9, 1977 – October 22, 1977
- Episodes: 26
- icon

Ginguiser (Japanese: 超合体魔術ロボギンガイザー, Hepburn: Chōgattai Majutsu Robo Gingaizā) is a Japanese mecha anime television series produced by Nippon Animation and co-produced by Ashi Productions. It ran from April 9 to October 22, 1977.

== Plot ==
The three "Spheres of Anderes" were artifacts created by the people of the alien empire of Sazoriani. These spheres were created 20,000 years ago to concentrate the energy of the constellation Scorpius and defeat Plasmani, another alien race, with whom they fought a long space war that was ended right on Earth.

In order to retrieve the missing spheres, the Sazoriani led an alien invasion force of huge mechanical monsters to Earth. To combat the invaders, Dr. Godo, the last descendant of the alien race Plasman, built the mecha Ginguiser and entrusted the four robots that combined into it (Spin Lancer, Grand Fighter, Bull Gator and the aircraft Air Roin) to four children respectively: Goro Shigoron, Miki Akitsu, Torajiro Haranami and Zanta. The four, who toured around the world with their traveling magic show, also had real magical powers (the "point barrier") and therefore are capable of controlling Ginguiser to stop the alien threat.

== Characters ==
- Goro Shirogane: Leader of the team, Goro owed his life to Dr. Godo, who saved his life years ago during a plane crash. Later the Doctor gave him the teachings necessary to use the technique of "point barrier".
- Miki Akitsu: The only girl in the group, she assisted in Goro's traveling magic shows as a presenter and also the co-pilot of Grand Fighter.
- Torajiro Aranami: The awkward but robust pilot of Bull Gator, although he was often forced to stay behind to improve their skills.
- Zanta Minami: Pilot of the Spin Lancer. He often companied Tora at the base of Dr. Godo, but never failing to prove his worth in combat.
- Dr. Godo: The Eminent scientist who was the head Ginguiser (Castle of Magic) and main pilot of the powerful robot. He was the last descendant of the ancient people of Plasmani that came to Earth to fight the Sazoriani twenty thousand years ago. Thanks to his skill in magic, he defended peace of the planet along with his team.

== Ginguiser ==
Ginguiser is a mecha composed of three smaller mecha (Grand Fighter, Spin Lancer, and Bull Gaiter) and an aerial fighter (Arrow Wing), all of which are themed after playing cards. Once combined Ginguiser is equipped with a circular saw on the right wrist called the Magic Buzz and a sword in its left hand called the Magic Saber. For a finishing move it can execute a ram attack called the Paranormal Smash.

=== Grand fighter ===
Grand fighter has a height of 50 meters, and weight of 500 tons. It can transform into a truck with an attached trailer.

- Magic Card - Ace of Spade cards that pop out from both wrists.
- Magic Ring - generate a ring shaped laser from both hands and stop enemy movement.
- Magic Missiles - missiles launched from the waist.
- Magic Hammer - a hammer with a chain that is summoned by opening the hands together.
- Magic Sword - a double-edged sword that materializes with light by opening the hands.
- Magic Laser - spade type ray emitted from chest spade mark.
- Magic Arm - a rocket punch type attack that fires an arm from the elbow.
- Magic Lancer - a spear that is completed by combining hex-shaped parts with bottom faces.

=== Bulgator ===
Bulgator has a height of 30 meters, and weight of 150 tons. It is the strongest of the three smaller robots and can transform into a locomotive rollercoaster. The second episode shows the flight form.

- Take Ball - an iron ball with a spine that opens from the chest armor and is injected.
- Torn-Battered - a bat-shaped hand-held weapon that transforms from the scallion.
- Magic Fire - a flame emitted from the chest.

=== Spin Lancer ===
Spin Lancer has a height of 30 meters, and weight of 100 tons. It is the most agile of the three smaller robots and can transform int a UFO park ride.

- Magic Spin - a spin attack while in UFO form.
- Magic Laser - laser fired from the V on its chest V, usually in random directions.
- Attachments - an optional weapon made by Santa. Equipped around the body, but the recoil is too strong, it does not hit it properly, when it fires all at once it self-bombs, and the cockpit is wrapped in high heat.

=== Arrow Wing ===
Artow wing is a support fighter aircraft in which the surplus parts separated when the Grand Fighter, Bulgariter, and Spin Lancer deform are completed.

- Missiles - standard missiles from the wing bases.
- Heart cutter - heart-shaped slashing projectiles fired from the rear fin.

== Revived Beasts ==
Throughout the series the Sazriani use chaos magic to revive dead monsters from twenty thousand years ago to acquire the Spheres of Anderes:

- Cobrasaurus: Appears in episode 1. Powers include flight, sonic waves and hurricane winds from the wings, an extendable tongue, eye and tail lasers, and body flames.
- Utsubora: Appears in episode 2. Powers include swimming, flight, mouth flames, eye energy orbs, coiling, launchable scales, fang missiles, and body sonic waves.
- Numera: Appears in episode 3. Powers include mouth flames, eye lasers, nose rockets, green mouth glue, and high jumping.
- Orcaking: Appears in episode 4. Powers include a pressurized blowhole, electric shocks, flight, a dorsal fin boomerang, and sharp arm fins.
- Yashaganda: Appears in episode 5. Powers include flight, knee and elbow spikes, and projectile resistant hair.
- Nauma: Appears in episodes 6 and 18. Powers include burrowing, twin tusks that emit energy bolts on both heads, eye energy orbs, and high body heat, launchable bones from the spine, flight, body separation, mouth missiles and gusts.
- Turton: Appears in episodes 7 and 18. Powers include flight, a spiked turtle shell, twin extendable tongues, and mouth flames.
- Dublama: Appears in episode 8. Powers include sharp claws that can double in size, flight, flames and rockets from the mouths on both heads, regeneration, and four rocket launchers in the torso.
- Meteogyser: Appears in episodes 9 and 18. Powers include swimming and sharp teeth.
- Hengera: Appears in episode 10.
  - Form 1: Powers include flight, super sonic rings from the rings, an extendable tongue, black eye lasers, and encasing himself in fire.
  - Form 2: Powers include flight, bombs disguised as scales, pink eye energy blasts, fang missiles, and body super sonic rings.
  - Form 3: Powers include flight, electric shocks, and a bladed crescent in the dorsal fin.
- Gamars: Appears in episodes 11 and 18. Powers include burrowing, blue and red mouth flames, an extendable tongue used for eating weapons, launchable back spikes, high jumping, eye lasers, and rolling into a ball.
- Dokane: Appears in episode 12. Powers include a pair of back sails that summon underground eruptions and electric surges, a whip tail, and high jumping.
- Kragera: Appears in episodes 13 and 18. Powers include swimming, four launchable drill tentacles for attacking and burrowing, dual squid whip tentacles, energy bolts from the antennae, levitation, and red acid from the underside mouth.
- Grizzler: Appears in episode 14. Powers include mouth flames, eye tractor beams, and sharp teeth.
- Crow Tanger: Appears in episode 15. Powers include flight, beak flames, spiked sandals, a wind fan that emits bright flashes, a launchable drill in the scalp jewel, and eye lasers, blasts, and electric bolts.
- Ugada: Appears in episode 16. Powers include flight, hurricane winds from the wings, and eye tractor beams.
- Eaglon: Appears in episode 17. Powers include flight, hurricane winds from the wings, eye lasers, body and mouth flames, sharp talons, and two launchable spikes on each wing and one on the scalp.
- Ammerser: Appears in episode 19. Powers include swimming, detachable tentacles, a nautilus shell armed with two horns that fire tractor beams, flight, spinning fast enough to create whirlpools, eight missile launchers on the shell, and eye lasers.
- Guillius: Appears in episode 20. Powers include twin head horns that fire energy balls, a whip tail, a bull form, summoning whirlpools, and pincer claw hands on chains that emit electricity.
- Gemora: Appears in episode 21. Powers include burrowing, sharp claws, drill missiles from the nose, launchable shoulder spikes, eye lasers, and flight.
- Dagoras: Appears in episode 22. Powers include swimming, tentacles with a drill missile on the tip, mouth ink streams, eye lasers, and heat resistance.
- Etocantoroger: Appears in episode 23. Powers include energy blasts from the eyes, ink streams and a flamethrower in the torso, nose rockets, and a torso tractor beam.
- Steamer: Appears in episode 24. Powers include hot steam from the mouth, three large claws for each hand, flight, and restraining pink energy.
- Inogra Gas: Appears in episode 25. Powers include extendable sharp tusks, a boar disguise, nose gusts, and an extendable tail.
- Pandaron: Appears in episode 26. Powers include eye lasers that can also emit entrapping gas, flight, and burrowing.
- Chaos Sphere: Appears in the Fire Crasher specials. Powers include flight, being surrounded in magic fire, thick armor, body spikes that emit electricity, and exploding.
- Gumoragamora: Appears in the Fire Crasher specials. Powers include flight, mouth webs, spear legs, functioning without a head, and body spikes.
