= Diany =

Brazilian footballer (born 1989)

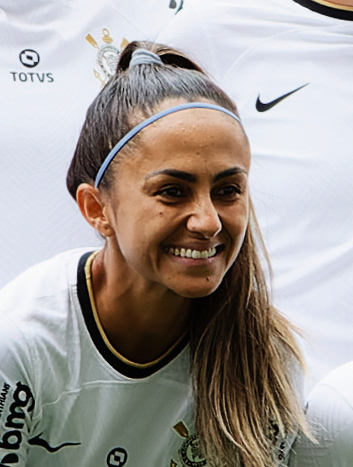
- Diany in 2023

Personal information
- Full name: Diany Aparecida Martins Xavier
- Date of birth: 22 December 1989 (age 36)
- Place of birth: Rio de Janeiro, Brazil
- Height: 1.63 m (5 ft 4 in)
- Position: Midfielder

Team information
- Current team: Palmeiras

Youth career
- 2007–2010: Mackenzie (futsal)

Senior career*
Years	Team	Apps	(Gls)
2010	Volta Redonda		
2011–2014	Vasco da Gama		
2014	Botafogo	10	(1)
2015–2017	Flamengo	32	(2)
2018–2023	Corinthians	76	(8)
2024–	Palmeiras	0	(0)

International career
2011–2017	Brazil military		
2015–2017	Brazil (University)		
Medal record
Women's football
Representing Brazil
Military World Games
Gold medal – first place	2015 South Korea	Women's
Summer Universiade
Gold medal – first place	2017 Taipei	Women's
- * Club domestic league appearances and goals as of 14:13, 14 February 2024 (UTC)

Diany Aparecida Martins Xavier (born 12 December 1989), simply known as Diany, is a Brazilian footballer who plays as a midfielder for Palmeiras.

== Club career ==
Born in Rio de Janeiro, Diany began her career playing futsal with hometown side Sport Club Mackenzie, moving to football in 2010 with Volta Redonda. In 2011, she joined Vasco da Gama, as the club had a partnership with the Brazilian Navy.

In 2015, Diany moved to Flamengo, after the women's team was reestablished under a partnership with the Navy. On 3 June 2018, she was announced at Corinthians.

After spending her first year as a backup, Diany subsequently established herself as a starter for Timão in the following years. On 20 December 2023, she left the club after not renewing her contract.

On 8 January 2024, Diany signed for Palmeiras.

== International career ==
A military, Diany received call-ups to the Brazil military national team, playing in the Military World Games. She received her first call-up to the Brazil national team in 2016, only returning in February 2018.

Diany was also a member of Brazil's University teams in the 2015 and 2017 editions of the Summer Universiade, scoring the winner in the latter edition's gold medal match.

== Honours ==
Vasco da Gama

- Campeonato Carioca de Futebol Feminino: 2012, 2013

Botafogo

- Campeonato Carioca de Futebol Feminino: 2014

Brazil military

- Military World Games: 2015

Flamengo

- Campeonato Carioca de Futebol Feminino: 2015, 2016, 2017
- Campeonato Brasileiro de Futebol Feminino Série A1: 2016

Brazil (University)

- Summer Universiade: 2017

Corinthians

- Campeonato Brasileiro de Futebol Feminino Série A1: 2018, 2020, 2021, 2022, 2023
- Copa Libertadores Femenina: 2019, 2021
- Campeonato Paulista de Futebol Feminino: 2019, 2020, 2021, 2023
- Supercopa do Brasil de Futebol Feminino: 2022, 2023
- Copa Paulista de Futebol Feminino: 2022

Palmeiras

- Campeonato Paulista de Futebol Feminino: 2024,2025
- Copa do Brasil de Futebol Feminino: 2025
- Brasil Ladies Cup: 2025
- Supercopa do Brasil de Futebol Feminino: 2026

=== Individual ===
- Bola de Prata: 2022
