= Football at the 2017 Summer Universiade – Women's tournament =

Women's football at the XXIX Summer Universiade

Tournament details
- Dates: 18–28 August
- Teams: 13 (from 5 confederations)
- Venue: 4

Final positions
- Champions: Brazil (3rd title)
- Runners-up: Japan
- Third place: Russia
- Fourth place: South Africa

Tournament statistics
- Matches played: 32
- Goals scored: 116 (3.63 per match)
- Top scorer(s): (Brazil) Carla Pereira Nunes (United Kingdom) Lucy Quinn (6 goals)

The women's tournament of football at the 2017 Summer Universiade was held from August 18 to 28 in Taipei, Taiwan.

== Teams ==
AFC	CAF	CONCACAF	CONMEBOL	UEFA
Chinese Taipei (H); Japan; South Korea	South Africa	Canada; Mexico; United States	Argentina; Brazil; Colombia	Great Britain; Republic of Ireland; Russia

== Preliminary round ==
- All times are Taiwan Standard Time (UTC+08:00)

=== Group A ===
Team	Pld	W	D	L	GF	GA	GD	Pts
United States	3	2	0	1	3	4	−1	6
South Korea	3	1	2	0	6	3	+3	5
Chinese Taipei	3	1	1	1	5	3	+2	4
Argentina	3	0	1	2	2	6	−4	1

18 August 2017
16:00

Chinese Taipei	3–0	Argentina
Chen 4', 61'; Lee 55'	Report

Fu Jen Catholic University Stadium, New Taipei City
Referee: Bùi Thị Thu Trang (Vietnam)
18 August 2017
16:00

South Korea	3–0	United States
Kim S. 18'; Han 66'; Son H. 81'	Report

New Taipei City Xinzhuang Stadium, New Taipei City
Referee: Anna Sidorova (Uzbekistan)

20 August 2017
19:30

Chinese Taipei	1–2	United States
Lee 90+1'	Report	Zlatic 1'; Baisden 54'

Fu Jen Catholic University Stadium, New Taipei City
Referee: Asaka Matsushita (Japan)
20 August 2017
19:30

South Korea	2–2	Argentina
Son H. 69'; Jang 84'	Report	Spiazzi 3'; Urbani 14'

Hsinchu County Second Stadium, Hsinchu County
Referee: Miss Pansa Chaisanit (Thailand)

22 August 2017
19:30

Chinese Taipei	1–1	South Korea
Yu 90'	Report	Son H. 69'

Fu Jen Catholic University Stadium, New Taipei City
Referee: Anna Sidorova (Uzbekistan)
22 August 2017
19:30

United States	1–0	Argentina
Bruder 30'	Report

New Taipei City Xinzhuang Stadium, New Taipei City
Referee: Doumouh Al Bakkar (Lebanon)

=== Group B ===
Team	Pld	W	D	L	GF	GA	GD	Pts
Mexico	2	1	1	0	2	0	+2	4
Canada	2	1	0	1	1	2	−1	3
Republic of Ireland	2	0	1	1	0	1	−1	1

18 August 2017
16:00

Mexico	0–0	Republic of Ireland
	Report

Hsinchu County Second Stadium, Hsinchu County
Referee: Oh Hyeon-jeong (South Korea)

20 August 2017
16:00

Canada	1–0	Republic of Ireland
Gosselin 64'	Report

Fu Jen Catholic University Stadium, New Taipei City
Referee: Mahsa Ghorbani (Iran)

22 August 2017
16:00

Canada	0–2	Mexico
	Report	Muñoz Soto 15'; Solís 33'

Fu Jen Catholic University Stadium, New Taipei City
Referee: Hung Yi Yu (Chinese Taipei)

=== Group C ===
Team	Pld	W	D	L	GF	GA	GD	Pts
Brazil	2	2	0	0	20	1	+19	6
Japan	2	1	0	1	15	3	+12	3
Colombia	2	0	0	2	0	31	−31	0

18 August 2017
16:00

Brazil	17–0	Colombia
De Oliveira 10', 15', 35'; Pereira Nunes 12', 18', 33', 76'; Locatelli 29'; Martins Xavier 31'; Lemos Ramos 37'; Ferreira Leite 43'; Batista da Costa 50'; Rafagnin Calderan 60'; Cadorini Fabem 61', 80', 82', 84'	Report

Chang Gung University Stadium, Taoyuan City
Referee: Lee Yi Chi (Chinese Taipei)

20 August 2017
19:30

Japan	14–0	Colombia
Otake 5', 48', 52'; Kumagai 16'; Horie 27', 50'; Miura 54'; Nakamura 56'; Matsubara 67'; Kawano 78', 79', 90+5'; Hirakuni 81'; De La Hoz 89' (o.g.)	Report

Chang Gung University Stadium, Taoyuan City
Referee: Thein Thein Aye (Myanmar)

22 August 2017
19:30

Japan	1–3	Brazil
Yamaguchi 90'	Report	Gomes de Lima 13'; Martins Xavier 15'; Pereira Nunes 49'

Chang Gung University Stadium, Taoyuan City
Referee: Trang Bui Thi Thu (Vietnam)

=== Group D ===
Team	Pld	W	D	L	GF	GA	GD	Pts
Russia	2	2	0	0	3	1	+2	6
South Africa	2	1	0	1	3	2	+1	3
Great Britain	2	0	0	2	2	5	−3	0

18 August 2017
11:00

Great Britain	1–3	South Africa
Quinn 45'	Report	Jane 47' (pen.); Kgatlana 82', 85'

Chang Gung University Stadium, Taoyuan City
Referee: Yoshimi Yamashita (Japan)

20 August 2017
19:30

Russia	1–0	South Africa
Kovalenko 14'	Report

New Taipei City Xinzhuang Stadium, New Taipei City
Referee: Cong Thi Dung (Vietnam)

22 August 2017
19:30

Russia	2–1	Great Britain
Chernomyrdina 54'; Pantyukhina 75' (pen.)	Report	Evans 64' (pen.)

Hsinchu County Second Stadium, Hsinchu County
Referee: Oh Hyeon-jeong (South Korea)

== Classification round ==
9th–13th place quarterfinal
A4	Argentina	1
D3	Great Britain	6

9th–12th place semifinals
A3	Chinese Taipei	1 (3)
B3	Republic of Ireland	1 (5)
D3	Great Britain	7
C3	Colombia	1

9th place
B3	Republic of Ireland	0
D3	Great Britain	2
11th place
A3	Chinese Taipei	5
C3	Colombia	0

=== 9th–13th place quarterfinal ===
24 August 2017
16:00

Argentina	1–6	Great Britain
Urbani 34'	Report	Quinn 17', 24', 74'; Hill 18'; Fergusson 29'; Donovan 49'

Hsinchu County Second Stadium, Hsinchu County
Referee: Trang Bui Thi Thu (Vietnam)

=== 9th–12th place semifinals ===
26 August 2017
16:00

Chinese Taipei	1–1	Republic of Ireland
Chen 32'	Report	Berrill 89'
Penalties
Yu (penalty scored); Liu (penalty scored); Chen (penalty missed); Lee (penalty scored)	3–5	Barrett (penalty scored); Kinsella (penalty scored); Jarrett (penalty scored); Berrill (penalty scored); Walsh (penalty scored)

Hsinchu County Second Stadium, Hsinchu County
Referee: Anna Sidorova (Uzbekistan)
26 August 2017
16:00

Great Britain	7–1	Colombia
Quinn 17', 33'; Dixon 19', 78'; Torres Roja 25' (o.g.); Johnson 62'; Lord-Mears 71'	Report	Torres Roja 47'

Fu Jen Catholic University Stadium, New Taipei City
Referee: Lee Yi-chi (Chinese Taipei)

=== 11th place match ===
28 August 2017
16:00

Chinese Taipei	5–0	Colombia
Yu 45' (pen.); Ting 45+2', 52'; Lo 62'; Lin 71'	Report

Hsinchu County Second Stadium, Hsinchu County
Referee: Thein Thein Aye (Myanmar)

=== 9th place match ===
28 August 2017
19:30

Republic of Ireland	0–2	Great Britain
	Report	Fox 27' (o.g.); Fergusson 57'

Chang Gung University Stadium, Taoyuan City
Referee: Mahsa Ghorbani (Iran)

== Elimination round ==
Fifth place
A1	United States	3
A2	South Korea	1
Seventh place
B1	Mexico	1
B2	Canada	0

5th–8th places semifinals
A1	United States	5
B1	Mexico	2
A2	South Korea (p)	0 (4)
B2	Canada	0 (3)

Quarterfinals
A1	United States	0
D2	South Africa	1
B1	Mexico	2
C2	Japan	3
A2	South Korea	0 (4)
D1	Russia (p)	0 (5)
B2	Canada	0
C1	Brazil	1

Semifinals
D2	South Africa	0
C2	Japan	4
D1	Russia	0
C1	Brazil	1

Final
C2	Japan	0
C1	Brazil (aet)	1
Third place
D2	South Africa	0
D1	Russia	5

=== Quarterfinals ===
24 August 2017
19:30

United States	0–1	South Africa
	Report	Biyana 74'

Fu Jen Catholic University Stadium, New Taipei City
Referee: Mahsa Ghorbani (Iran)
24 August 2017
19:30

Mexico	2–3	Japan
Robles Partida 62'; Casas Escudero 85'	Report	Umezu 31'; Nakamura 76'; Kawano 78'

Chang Gung University Stadium, Taoyuan City
Referee: Anna Sidorova (Uzbekistan)
24 August 2017
19:30

South Korea	0–0	Russia
	Report
Penalties
Jang (penalty scored); Kim S. (penalty scored); Han (penalty scored); Kim H. (penalty scored); Kim M. (penalty missed)	4–5	(penalty scored) Cholovyaga; (penalty scored) Chernomyrdina; (penalty scored) Fedorova; (penalty scored) Smirnova; (penalty scored) Pantyukhina

New Taipei City Xinzhuang Stadium, New Taipei City
Referee: Asaka Matsushita (Japan)
24 August 2017
19:30

Canada	0–1	Brazil
	Report	Pereira Nunes 68' (pen.)

Hsinchu County Second Stadium, Hsinchu County
Referee: Doumouh Al Bakkar (Lebanon)

=== 5th–8th place semifinals ===
26 August 2017
19:30

United States	5–2	Mexico
Irwin 9'; Bruder 30', 35'; Ayers 37'; Battan 40'	Report	Solis 45+1'; Piña 69'

New Taipei City Xinzhuang Stadium, New Taipei City
Referee: Oh Hyeon-jeong (South Korea)
26 August 2017
19:30

South Korea	0–0	Canada
Penalties
Kim S. (penalty scored); Lee S.-h. (penalty scored); Ahn (penalty missed); Jang (penalty scored); Lee S.-g. (penalty scored)	4–3	(penalty missed) Roy; (penalty missed) Schellenberg; (penalty scored) Gosselin; (penalty scored) Klasios; (penalty scored) Callender

Chang Gung University Stadium, Taoyuan City
Referee: Cong Thi Dung (Vietnam)

=== Semifinals ===
26 August 2017
19:30

South Africa	0–4	Japan
	Report	Matsubara 8'; Miura 13'; Yamaguchi 59', 84'

Hsinchu County Second Stadium, Hsinchu County
Referee: Miss Pansa Chaisanit (Thailand)
26 August 2017
19:30

Russia	0–1	Brazil
	Report	Giovanna Oliveira 29'

Fu Jen Catholic University Stadium, New Taipei City
Referee: Yoshimi Yamashita (Japan)

=== 7th place match ===
28 August 2017
19:30

Mexico	1–0	Canada
Evangelista 19'	Report

New Taipei City Xinzhuang Stadium, New Taipei City
Referee: Anna Sidorova (Uzbekistan)

=== 5th place match ===
28 August 2017
19:30

United States	3–1	South Korea
Irwin 36', 49'; Ayers 37'	Report	Kim S. 59' (pen.)

Hsinchu County Second Stadium, Hsinchu County
Referee: Cong Thi Dung (Vietnam)

=== Bronze medal match ===
28 August 2017
16:00

South Africa	0–5	Russia
	Report	Pantyukhina 51', 65' (pen.); Mashina 54'; Fedorova 78'; Shkoda 89'

Fu Jen Catholic University Stadium, New Taipei City
Referee: Asaka Matsushita (Japan)

=== Gold medal match ===
28 August 2017
19:30

Japan	0–1 (a.e.t.)	Brazil
	Report	Martins Xavier 112'

Fu Jen Catholic University Stadium, New Taipei City
Referee: Miss Pansa Chaisanit (Thailand)

== Final standings ==
Place	Team	W–D–L
1st place, gold medalist(s)	Brazil	5–0–0
2nd place, silver medalist(s)	Japan	3–0–2
3rd place, bronze medalist(s)	Russia	3–1–1
4	South Africa	2–0–3
5	United States	4–0–2
6	South Korea	1–4–1
7	Mexico	2–1–2
8	Canada	1–1–3
9	Great Britain	3–0–2
10	Republic of Ireland	0–2–2
11	Chinese Taipei	2–2–1
12	Colombia	0–0–4
13	Argentina	0–1–3
