= Football at the Military World Games =

- Founded: 1995
- Region: International (CISM)
- Current champions: Bahrain M (1st title); North Korea W (2nd title)
- Most championships: Algeria M Egypt M (2 titles each); Brazil W North Korea W (2 titles each)

Association football, more commonly known as football or soccer, has been included Military World Games in 1995 as a men's competition sport. Women's football was added to the official program in 2007. The tournament is also a part of the World Military Cup.

== Tournaments ==
=== Men ===
Year	Host	Final			Third Place Match		
Year	Host	Champions	Score	Runners-Up	Third Place	Score	Fourth Place
1995; Details	(Italy) Rome	France	1–0	Iran	South Korea	1–0	Cyprus
1999; Details	(Croatia) Zagreb	Egypt	3–3 (5–4 p)	Greece	Croatia	2–0	Germany
2003; Details	(Italy) Catania	North Korea	3–2	Egypt	Italy	3–2	Lithuania
2007; Details	(India) Hyderabad	Egypt	2–0	Cameroon	North Korea	2–0	Qatar
2011; Details	(Brazil) Rio de Janeiro	Algeria	1–0	Egypt	Brazil	1–0 (a.e.t.)	Qatar
2015; Details	(South Korea) Mungyeong	Algeria	2–0 (a.e.t.)	Oman	South Korea	3–2	Egypt
2019; Details	(China) Wuhan	Bahrain	3–1	Qatar	Algeria	4–0	North Korea

=== Women ===
Year	Host nation	Final			Third Place Match		
Year	Host nation	Winner	Score	Second Place	Third Place	Score	Fourth Place
2007; Details	(India) Hyderabad	North Korea	5–0	Germany	France	1–0	Netherlands
2011; Details	(Brazil) Rio de Janeiro	Brazil	5–0	Germany	Netherlands	2–0	France
2015; Details	(South Korea) Mungyeong	Brazil	2–1 (a.e.t.)	France	South Korea	3–0	Netherlands
2019; Details	(China) Wuhan	North Korea	2–1	China	Brazil	3–1	South Korea

== Medal table ==
=== Overall ===
Rank	Nation	Gold	Silver	Bronze	Total
1	North Korea (PRK)	3	0	1	4
2	Egypt (EGY)	2	2	0	4
3	Brazil (BRA)	2	0	2	4
4	Algeria (ALG)	2	0	1	3
5	France (FRA)	1	1	1	3
6	Bahrain (BHR)	1	0	0	1
7	Germany (GER)	0	2	0	2
8	Cameroon (CMR)	0	1	0	1
8	China (CHN)	0	1	0	1
8	Greece (GRE)	0	1	0	1
8	Iran (IRI)	0	1	0	1
8	Oman (OMA)	0	1	0	1
8	Qatar (QAT)	0	1	0	1
14	South Korea (KOR)	0	0	3	3
15	Croatia (CRO)	0	0	1	1
15	Italy (ITA)	0	0	1	1
15	Netherlands (NED)	0	0	1	1
Totals (17 entries)		11	11	11	33

=== Men ===
Rank	Nation	Gold	Silver	Bronze	Total
1	Egypt	2	2	0	4
2	Algeria	2	0	1	3
3	North Korea	1	0	1	2
4	Bahrain	1	0	0	1
4	France	1	0	0	1
6	Cameroon	0	1	0	1
6	Greece	0	1	0	1
6	Iran	0	1	0	1
6	Oman	0	1	0	1
6	Qatar	0	1	0	1
11	South Korea	0	0	2	2
12	Brazil	0	0	1	1
12	Croatia	0	0	1	1
12	Italy	0	0	1	1
Totals (14 entries)		7	7	7	21

=== Women ===
Rank	Nation	Gold	Silver	Bronze	Total
1	Brazil	2	0	1	3
2	North Korea	2	0	0	2
3	Germany	0	2	0	2
4	France	0	1	1	2
5	China	0	1	0	1
6	Netherlands	0	0	1	1
6	South Korea	0	0	1	1
Totals (7 entries)		4	4	4	12

== See also ==
- World Military Cup
- African Military Cup
- Americas Military Cup
