= Hacène Ogbi =

Algerian footballer (born 1989)

Personal information
- Full name: Hacène Ogbi Benhadouche
- Date of birth: August 17, 1989 (age 37)
- Place of birth: Algiers, Algeria
- Height: 1.76 m (5 ft 9 in)
- Position: Attacking midfielder

Team information
- Current team: CB Mila

Youth career
- USM El Harrach

Senior career*
Years	Team	Apps	(Gls)
2008–2010	USM El Harrach	–	(–)
2010–2012	NA Hussein Dey	18	(4)
2012–2014	ES Sétif	16	(2)
2014–2015	USM Bel-Abbès	28	(2)
2015–2016	MC Oran	18	(1)
2016–2017	MC Oujda	–	(–)
2017–2018	US Biskra		
2018–2019	Damac	27	(9)
2019–2020	Al-Jabalain	16	(6)
2020	Ohod	16	(3)
2020–2021	Al-Khaleej	33	(5)
2021–2022	Al-Diriyah	32	(6)
2022–2023	Al-Muharraq		
2023–2024	USM Khenchela	23	(2)
2024–2025	USM El Harrach		
2025–2026	CA Batna	29	(3)
2026–	MO Béjaïa	0	(0)

International career
2010–2011	Algeria military	–	(–)
- * Club domestic league appearances and goals as of 27 July 2026

Hacène Ogbi Benhadouche (Arabic: حسان عقبي بن حدوش; born August 17, 1989) is an Algerian footballer plays for MO Béjaïa.

== Career ==
=== Club career ===
In June 2015, Ogbi signed a contract with MC Oran coming from USM Bel-Abbès. On 31 July 2021, Ogbi joined Al-Diriyah. On 24 July 2022, Ogbi joined Al-Muharraq on a one-year deal. On 17 August 2023, he signed for USM Khenchela. On 17 August 2024, he joined USM El Harrach. On 14 August 2025, he signed for CA Batna. On 26 July 2026, he joined MO Béjaïa.

=== International career ===
On 2010 Ogbi joined Algeria national military team. He was champion of the Military World Games on 2011 in Rio de Janeiro. This competition is also a part of the World Military Cup.

== Honours ==
ES Sétif

- Algerian Ligue 1: 2011–12

ES Sétif

- Algerian Cup: 2011–12

Algeria

- Military World Games: 2011
