= Urusei Yatsura: Only You =

1983 Japanese animated film

- Theatrical release poster

Japanese name
- Kanji: うる星やつら オンリー・ユー
Transcriptions
- Revised Hepburn: Urusei Yatsura Onri Yu
- Directed by: Mamoru Oshii
- Written by: Tomoko Konparu
- Based on: Urusei Yatsura by Rumiko Takahashi
- Produced by: Yuji Nunokawa
- Cinematography: Akio Wakana
- Music by: Izumi Kobayashi; Fumitaka Anzai; Koji Nishimura; Masamichi Amano
- Production companies: Studio Pierrot; Kitty Films
- Distributed by: Toho
- Release date: February 11, 1983 (Japan)
- Running time: 101 minutes
- Country: Japan
- Language: Japanese

Urusei Yatsura: Only You (Japanese: うる星やつら オンリー・ユー, Hepburn: Urusei Yatsura Onri Yu) is a 1983 Japanese animated fantasy comedy film directed by Mamoru Oshii in his film directorial debut. It is the first in the Urusei Yatsura film series based on the manga of the same name by Rumiko Takahashi. It was released in Japan on Friday, February 11, 1983 during the second season of the series.

== Voice cast ==
Character	Voice
Ataru Moroboshi	Toshio Furukawa
Lum	Fumi Hirano
Shinobu Miyake	Saeko Shimazu
Shutaro Mendou	Akira Kamiya
Ten	Kazuko Sugiyama
Cherry	Ichirō Nagai
Sakura	Machiko Washio
Megane	Shigeru Chiba
Perm	Akira Murayama
Elle	Yoshiko Sakakibara; Shiori (child)
Nanabake Rose	Hiroko Maruyama
Chibi	Issei Futamata
Barbara	Naoko Kyoda
Assistant Driver	Bin Shimada
Kakugari	Shinji Nomura
Guard A	Hideyuki Tanaka
Guard B	Yoku Shioya
Commander	Mugihito
Announcer	Hiroshi Izawa
Oni Commander	Kazuyo Aoki
Child A	Kazuki Suzuki
Child B	Nariko Fujieda
Ataru's Father	Kenichi Ogata
Ataru's Mother	Natsumi Sakuma
Planet Elle Commander	Kiyomi Hanasaki; Kumiko Takizawa; Sanae Takagi; Yuuko Masutani
Oyuki	Noriko Ohara
Princess Kurama	Rihoko Yoshida
Lum's Father	Ritsuo Sawa
Lum's Mother	Reiko Yamada
Rei	Tessho Genda
Driver	Yuuichi Sakuraniwa

== Production ==
Only You borrows heavily from the Japanese fairy tale of Urashima Tarō. The fairy tale would later inspire the film's sequel, Beautiful Dreamer. In an interview featured in Art Handbook in 2000, Oshii expressed disappointment with the film, claiming "It's no film. It failed to be a film."

== Release ==
Only You was released theatrically in Japan on February 11, 1983, where it was distributed by Toho. AnimEigo released the film in North America on subtitled-LaserDisc on November 11, 1992, as Urusei Yatsura Movie 1–Only You, and then on VHS on June 29, 1995. They later released it on DVD with an English-language dub on October 21, 2003. Discotek Media acquired the North American rights in 2020 and released it on Blu-ray on December 31, 2021, including the AnimEigo dub.

== Reception ==
Allen Divers of Anime News Network gave the subtitled version of the film an overall grade of "A", and the dubbed version a "B" grade, writing that "Despite its age, Urusei Yatsura is a solid series of the romantic comedy genre that has aged very well. Its simple designs and over the top characters make it a joy for all who watch it. Newer fans may be at a loss as they struggle with the archaic look of the series, but can see the origins of many more current series they enjoy now. Urusei Yatsura is one of the original wacky love tales that helped define the entire genre. Without it and many of Rumiko Takahashi's other works, the romantic comedy genre would not be what it is today. Old school fans will enjoy what this movie has to offer, and those new to the series can sit back and enjoy it as well. A classic story given the royal treatment".

Jasper Sharp of Midnight Eye wrote that the film "throws the viewer completely in at the deep-end, assuming at least some knowledge of the characters and their relationships is in place, though it shouldn't take too long for newcomers to find their feet." Dani Moure of Mania.com called the film "a lot of fun, and for the most part [...] very enjoyable." Chris Beveridge, also of Mania.com, wrote that "the budget is bigger and the designs are more detailed."
