= Urusei Yatsura (film series) =

Film series

- Artwork for the Japanese Blu-ray Urusei Yatsura film series box set

うる星やつら
- Genre: Romantic comedy; Science fiction
- Anime film

Only You
- Directed by: Mamoru Oshii
- Written by: Tomoko Konparu
- Music by: Katsu Hoshi
- Studio: Studio Pierrot
- Licensed by: NA: Discotek Media; UK: MVM Films
- Released: February 13, 1983
- Runtime: 101 minutes
- Anime film

Beautiful Dreamer
- Directed by: Mamoru Oshii
- Written by: Mamoru Oshii
- Music by: Masaru Hoshi
- Studio: Studio Pierrot
- Licensed by: NA: Discotek Media
- Released: February 11, 1984
- Runtime: 96 minutes
- Anime film

Remember My Love
- Directed by: Kazuo Yamazaki
- Written by: Tomoko Konparu
- Music by: Mickey Yoshino
- Studio: Studio Deen
- Licensed by: NA: Discotek Media; UK: MVM Films
- Released: January 26, 1985
- Runtime: 93 minutes
- Anime film

Lum the Forever
- Directed by: Kazuo Yamazaki
- Written by: Toshiki Inoue
- Music by: Bun Itakura
- Studio: Studio Deen
- Licensed by: NA: Discotek Media; UK: MVM Films
- Released: February 22, 1986
- Runtime: 94 minutes
- Original video animation

Making of Urusei Yatsura 4: Lum the Forever
- Directed by: Kazuo Yamazaki
- Studio: Studio Deen
- Licensed by: NA: Discotek Media; UK: MVM Films
- Released: February 15, 1986
- Runtime: 45 minutes
- Anime film

The Final Chapter
- Directed by: Satoshi Dezaki
- Written by: Tomoko Konparu
- Music by: Toshiyuki Omori
- Studio: Magic Bus
- Licensed by: NA: Discotek Media; UK: MVM Films
- Released: February 6, 1988
- Runtime: 86 minutes
- Anime film

Always, My Darling
- Directed by: Katsuhisa Yamada
- Written by: Hideo Takayashiki
- Music by: Mitsuru Kotaki
- Studio: Madhouse
- Licensed by: NA: Discotek Media; UK: MVM Films
- Released: August 18, 1991
- Runtime: 77 minutes
- Original video animation

Urusei Yatsura OVA (Note: English title.)
- Studio: Magic Bus (#1–5); Madhouse (#6–9); Sunrise (#10)
- Licensed by: NA: Discotek Media (excluding OVA 10)
- Released: July 18, 1987 – December 23, 2008
- Episodes: 10
- icon

Rumiko Takahashi's Urusei Yatsura, a Japanese anime and manga series, has six films and ten OVA releases. During the television run of the series, four theatrical films were produced. Urusei Yatsura: Only You was directed by Mamoru Oshii and began showing in Japanese cinemas on February 11, 1983. Urusei Yatsura 2: Beautiful Dreamer was also directed by Mamoru Oshii and was released on February 11, 1984. Urusei Yatsura 3: Remember My Love was directed by Kazuo Yamazaki and released on January 26, 1985. Urusei Yatsura 4: Lum the Forever was directed again by Kazuo Yamazaki and released on February 22, 1986.

After the conclusion of the television series, two more films were produced. A year after the television series finished, Urusei Yatsura: The Final Chapter was directed by Satoshi Dezaki and was released on February 6, 1988, as a tenth anniversary celebration. It was shown as a double bill with a Maison Ikkoku film. The final film, Urusei Yatsura: Always My Darling was directed by Katsuhisa Yamada and was released on November 2, 1991. In North America, Beautiful Dreamer was released by Central Park Media. The remaining five films were released by AnimEigo in North America and MVM Films in the United Kingdom. After re-releasing Beautiful Dreamer in North America in 2018, Discotek Media acquired the rights to the other five films in 2020.

On September 24, 1985, the special Ryoko's September Tea Party was released, consisting of a mixture of previously broadcast footage along with 15 minutes of new material. Almost a year later on September 15, 1986, Memorial Album was released, also mixing new and old footage. On July 18, 1987, the first OVA for the series Inaba the Dreammaker was released. It was followed by Raging Sherbet on December 2, 1988, and by Nagisa's Fiancé four days later on December 8, 1988. The Electric Household Guard was released on August 21, 1989, and followed by I Howl at the Moon on September 1, 1989. They were followed by Goat and Cheese on December 21, 1989, and Catch the Heart on December 27, 1989. Finally, Terror of Girly-Eyes Measles and Date with a Spirit were released on June 21, 1991. The OVA's were released in North America by AnimEigo who released them individually over 6 discs. AnimEigo produced dubs for the DVD releases.

On December 23, 2008, a new special was shown for the first time at the It's a Rumic World exhibition of Rumiko Takahashi's works. Entitled The Obstacle Course Swim Meet, it was the first animated content for the series in 17 years. On January 29, 2010, a boxset was released featuring all of the recent Rumiko Takahashi specials from the Rumic World exhibition. Entitled It's a Rumic World, the boxset contains The Obstacle Course Swim meet as well as a figure of Lum. The OVAs are not true OVAs, however, as they were all released theatrically prior to being released on video.

== Only You ==
Release date: February 13, 1983, dubbed 2003.

Urusei Yatsura: Only You (うる星やつら オンリー・ユー, Urusei Yatsura Onrī Yū) was released in 1983. The guest characters include Elle, another alien princess, who is in charge of Planet Elle.

6-year-old Ataru Moroboshi steps on Elle's shadow during an impromptu game of shadow-tag; in Elle's culture, this is viewed as a marriage proposal. Eleven years later, Elle returns to Earth in order to marry Ataru — by which time not only had he forgotten the events of his childhood, but he was also going out with Lum. The rest of the plot focuses on Lum's attempts to prevent the marriage.

The film was directed by Mamoru Oshii, who was mad at the many requests that the producer made of him to alter the film. Rumiko Takahashi considers this film her favorite and it is the most true to the original series.

A subtitled Laserdisc of the film was released by AnimEigo in North America on September 25, 1993.

=== Additional cast ===
- Yoshiko Sakakibara as Elle
- Hisako Kyouda as Babara
- Hiroko Maruyama as Rose
- Kazuyo Aoki as Commander
- Bin Shimada as Assistant Commander
- Shiori as Elle (young)
- Kazuki Suzuki as Child A
- Nariko Fujieda as Child B

== Beautiful Dreamer ==
Release date: February 11, 1984, dubbed 1996.

Urusei Yatsura 2: Beautiful Dreamer (うる星やつら2 ビューティフル・ドリーマー, Urusei Yatsura 2 Byūtifuru Dorīmā) is the second Urusei Yatsura film.

Like its predecessor, Beautiful Dreamer borrows heavily from the Japanese fairy tale of Urashima Tarō. Writer/director Mamoru Oshii, unsatisfied with how the first film, Only You, had developed, rejected the idea of catering to audience expectations and decided to do the film his own way. This almost caused Takahashi to reject the script because it deviated so far from the original story.

Even though the film is generally well-loved by English-speaking fans, when it was first released in Japan the response was not as favorable. Criticism was especially given towards Oshii, generally from the fan community. As a result, Oshii quit working on the production of Urusei Yatsura and went on to do other more experimental projects. Despite this, the film has been referred to by most fans as the best film in the Urusei Yatsura series.

=== Additional cast ===
- Takuya Fujioka as Mujaki

== Remember My Love ==
Release date: January 26, 1985, dubbed 2003.

Urusei Yatsura 3: Remember My Love (うる星やつら3 リメンバー・マイ・ラヴ, Urusei Yatsura 3 Rimenbā Mai Ravu) is the third Urusei Yatsura film. The guest characters are:

- Ruu, a mysterious boy bent on fixing Lum's life
- Lahla, Ruu's tutor, who tries to get things set straight

The third film finds Ataru transformed into a pink hippopotamus, which sends Lum chasing after the wicked magician responsible, with catastrophic results. With Lum gone, her friends decide that there is no reason to remain, and so Tomobiki slowly returns to normal. The highlight of the film is a high speed chase scene with an angry Lum flying after the mysterious Ruu through the city at night and into a hall of mirrors (and illusion). Ataru's true feelings for Lum are probably more obvious in this film than in any of the others.

The film grossed ¥1.17 billion ($7.39 million) at the Japanese box office, becoming the year's eighth highest-grossing Japanese film. A subtitled Laserdisc was released by AnimEigo in North America on January 19, 1994. It is also notable for the anime debut of Bulma from the Dragon Ball franchise, which would later receive its anime premiere the following year.

=== Additional cast ===
- Mitsuo Iwata as Ruu
- Sumi Shimamoto as Lahla
- Masako Sugaya as Oshima
- Hisako Kyouda as Old Lady

== Lum the Forever ==
Release date: February 22, 1986, dubbed 2004.

Urusei Yatsura 4: Lum the Forever (うる星やつら4 ラム・ザ・フォーエバー, Urusei Yatsura 4 Ramu za Fōebā) is the fourth Urusei Yatsura film. Guest characters include Tarōzakura, the great cherry tree.

A horror film production comes to town, casting the cast of the series as extras in the production. But when the director orders the cutting down of a cursed great cherry tree called Tarōzakura, the remains of the tree curses Lum by way of removing her horns and powers. The quest to restore Lum's demon powers puts Ataru at odds with the spirit of the tree, who forces the cast of the slasher film to believe they are their roles as it seeks vengeance upon the film crew.

There was also released on 15 February 1986 a Making of Urusei Yatsura 4: Lum the Forever (メイキング・オブ・うる星やつら4 アニメ製作の実際) documentation about the film.

=== Additional cast ===
- Mugihito as Mendou's Father
- Bin Shimada as Tobimaro Mizunokoji
- Sumi Shimamoto as Asuka Mizunokoji

== The Final Chapter ==
Release date: February 6, 1988, dubbed 2004.

Urusei Yatsura: The Final Chapter (うる星やつら 完結篇, Urusei Yatsura: Kanketsuhen) is the fifth Urusei Yatsura film. Guest characters include:

- Rupa, Lum's fiancé
- Carla, is said to be Rupa's betrothed.

The fifth film is an animated adaptation of the final story of the manga and is also the official ending of the anime series, in which Lum and Ataru must repeat the game of tag played out in the first episode of the television series, or the Earth will be infested with mushrooms larger than buildings. Further, should Ataru lose, Lum will leave forever and everyone's memories will be changed so that they don't remember she, or her friends, were ever there. Finally, Lum refuses to allow Ataru to win unless he says to her those three words, "I love you", that he has steadfastly refused to say over the entire series. Maison Ikkoku: The Final Chapter was also released on the same date as this film.

=== Additional cast ===
- Hirotaka Suzuoki as Inaba
- Kaneto Shiozawa as Rupa
- Yō Inoue as Carla
- Kōichi Kitamura as Upa (Rupa's grandfather)

== Always My Darling ==
Release date: August 18, 1991, dubbed 2005.

Urusei Yatsura: Always My Darling (うる星やつら いつだってマイ・ダーリン, Urusei Yatsura Itsudatte Mai Dārin) (alternately Forever My Darling) is the sixth Urusei Yatsura film and the tenth anniversary special. It is not the end of the anime series despite coming after The Final Chapter. The character designer and animation director for the film was Kumiko Takahashi. The regular theatrical release in Japan was the November 2, 1991 and it was shown on a double bill with the first Ranma ½ feature, Big Trouble in Nekonron, China. Guest characters include Lupika, another alien princess.

Lupika, an alien princess, is in love with a tofu seller. To make him love her too (at least, announce his love. He obviously fears the social taboo of a tofu vendor marrying a princess), she needs to get a love potion, which is in a certain temple. Legend has it that the only person that can obtain this love potion is the most lecherous man in the universe. That man turns out to be Ataru Moroboshi. Lupika kidnaps Ataru to make him get the potion, and Lum and her friends go out to search for Ataru.

This film has been referred to by some fans as the worst of the series.

Due to this, this was the last animated released content for the franchise until 2008 release of the 10th OVA.

A subtitled Laserdisc was released by AnimEigo in North America on July 27, 1994.

=== Additional cast ===
- Naoko Matsui as Lupika
- Shinnosuke Furumoto as Rio
- Isamu Tanonaka as Commander

== OVA releases ==
Urusei Yatsura also has a number of direct-to-market video releases which include stories not covered in the TV series or films. All of them were released in theaters prior to being released on video. All were released after the ending of the series.

| No. | Title | Directed by | Written by | Animation directed by | Original release date |
|---|---|---|---|---|---|
| 1 | "Inaba the Dreammaker"; Transliteration: "Yume no Shikakenin, Inaba-kun Tōjō! Ramu no Mirai wa Dōnaruccha" (Japanese: 夢の仕掛人、因幡くん登場! ラムの未来はどうなるっちゃ) | Directed by : Tsuneo Tominaga; Storyboarded by : Setsuko Shibuichi & Tsuneo Tominaga | Kazumi Koide & Toshiaki Imaizumi | Yukari Kobayashi | 18 July 1987 |
Shinobu, Ataru and Lum meet Inaba, a strange boy in a rabbit suit. Inaba (who seems to have a thing for Shinobu) leads them to the Room of Destiny, where they get to explore various futures.
| 2 | "Raging Sherbet"; Transliteration: "Ikare Shābetto" (Japanese: 怒れシャーベット) | Directed by : Kenjirō Yoshida; Storyboarded by : Katsuhiko Nishijima | Machiko Kondō | Katsuhiko Nishijima | 2 December 1988 |
| 3 | "Nagisa's Fiancé"; Transliteration: "Nagisa no Fianse" (Japanese: 渚のフィアンセ) | Directed by : Yorifusa Yamaguchi; Storyboarded by : Setsuko Shibuichi | Rumiko Takahashi | Setsuko Shibuichi | 8 December 1988 |
| 4 | "The Electric Household Guard"; Transliteration: "Denki Jikake no Oniwaban" (Japanese: 電気仕掛けのお庭番) | Directed by : Kenjirō Yoshida; Storyboarded by : Iku Suzuki | Rumiko Takahashi | Yukari Kobayashi | 21 August 1989 |
| 5 | "I Howl at the Moon"; Transliteration: "Tsuki ni Hoeru" (Japanese: 月に吠える) | Tsuneo Tominaga | Machiko Kondō | Yukari Kobayashi | 2 September 1989 |
| 6 | "Goat and Cheese"; Transliteration: "Yagi-san to Chīzu" (Japanese: ヤギさんとチーズ) | Tensai Okamura | Tensai Okamura | Tensai Okamura | 21 December 1989 |
| 7 | "Catch the Heart"; Transliteration: "Hāto o Tsukame" (Japanese: ハートをつかめ) | Yū Kō | Tatsuhiko Urahata | Kenji Yoshioka | 27 December 1989 |
| 8 | "Terror of Girly-Eyes Measles"; Transliteration: "Otome Bashika no Kyōfu" (Japanese: 乙女ばしかの恐怖) | Directed by : Shigeto Makino; Storyboarded by : Yū Kō | Hidehiro Fujiwara | Atsushi Shigeta & Shin'ichi Imakuma | 21 June 1991 |
| 9 | "Date with a Spirit"; Transliteration: "Reikon to Dēto" (Japanese: 霊魂とデート) | Makoto Moriwaki | Tatsuhiko Urahata | Atsushi Shigeta | 21 June 1991 |
| 10 | "The Obstacle Course Swim Meet"; Transliteration: "Za Shōgaibutsu Suiei Taikai" (Japanese: THE 障害物水泳大会) | Directed by : Toru Kitahata; Storyboarded by : Yoshitomo Yonetani | Michiko Yokote | Tsukasa Dokite | 23 December 2008 |
