= 1953 World Men's Military Cup =

Tournament details
- Host country: Turkey
- Cities: Ankara & Istanbul
- Dates: 14–23 March
- Teams: 7
- Venues: 2 (in 2 host cities)

Final positions
- Champions: Belgium (2nd title)
- Runners-up: Turkey
- Third place: Greece

Tournament statistics
- Matches played: 10
- Goals scored: 34 (3.4 per match)

The 1953 World Men's Military Cup was the 8th edition of the World Military Cup, the football military championship of the world. It was hosted by Ankara and Istanbul, Turkey. The format of competition was a championship in the final tournament.

== Qualified teams ==
- Belgium
- Egypt
- France
- Greece
- Italy
- Netherlands
- Turkey

== Venues ==
Ankara	1953 World Men's Military Cup is located in Turkey	Istanbul
19 Mayıs Stadium	1953 World Men's Military Cup is located in Turkey	Mithatpaşa Stadium
Capacity: 19,219	1953 World Men's Military Cup is located in Turkey	Capacity: ?

== Results ==
=== Group A ===
Team	Pld	W	D	L	GF	GA	GD	Pts
Belgium	2	1	1	0	3	1	+2	3
Italy	2	1	0	1	5	5	0	2
Netherlands	2	0	1	1	4	6	−2	1

14 March 1953

Belgium	1 − 1	Netherlands
Vliers 54'	Report	Bennaars 4'

19 Mayıs Stadium, Ankara
Attendance: 4,500
Referee: Luigi Gemini (Italy)
15 March 1953

Italy	5 − 3	Netherlands
Gianmarinaro 4'; Bettini 14'; Marra 16'; Savioni 64', 70'	Report	Piet Vergouwen 50'; Bennaars 75'; Louer 87'

19 Mayıs Stadium, Ankara
Attendance: 15,000
Referee: Zülbahar Sağnak (Turkey)
17 March 1953

Belgium	2 − 0	Italy
Piters 16'; Van Huffel 26'	Report

Mithatpaşa Stadium, Istanbul
Attendance: 11,842
Referee: Zoumboulakis (Greece)

=== Group B ===
Team	Pld	W	D	L	GF	GA	GD	Pts
Greece	2	2	0	0	3	0	+3	4
France	2	1	0	1	5	3	+2	2
Egypt	2	0	0	2	2	7	−5	0

15 March 1953

France	5 − 2	Egypt
Ludo 9', 17'; Piantoni 18'; Leblond 22'; Marcel 55' (pen.)	Report	? 27'; Saad Rashed 73'

19 Mayıs Stadium, Ankara
Attendance: 15,000
Referee: Karl Lescart (Belgium)
17 March 1953

Greece	1 − 0	France
Nembidis 51'	Report

Mithatpaşa Stadium, Istanbul
Attendance: 11,842
Referee: Luigi Gemini (Italy)
18 March 1953

Greece	2 − 0	Egypt
Assimakopoulos 15'; Petropoulos 43'	Report

Mithatpaşa Stadium, Istanbul
Attendance: 5,000
Referee: Jan Bronkhorst (Netherlands)

=== Final Group ===
Turkey qualified directly for the final group as a host country.

Team	Pld	W	D	L	GF	GA	GD	Pts
Belgium	2	2	0	0	4	2	+2	4
Turkey	2	1	0	1	3	3	0	2
Greece	2	0	0	2	0	2	-2	0

19 March 1953

Belgium	3 − 2	Turkey
Vliers 22', 24'; Van Huffel 37'	Report	Ülük 23' (pen.); Çetinel 81'

Mithatpaşa Stadium, Istanbul
Attendance: 9,409
Referee: Luigi Gemini (Italy)
21 March 1953

Turkey	1 − 0	Greece
Çetinel 21'	Report

19 Mayıs Stadium, Ankara
Attendance: 15,000+
Referee: Jan Bronkhorst (Netherlands)
23 March 1953

Belgium	1 − 0	Greece
Van Gestel 75'	Report

19 Mayıs Stadium, Ankara
Referee: Jan Bronkhorst (Netherlands)

=== Memorial match ===
This match played for the victims of the earthquake of 18 March 1953 in the Çanakkale peninsula region.

22 March 1953

France	4 − 1	Netherlands
Piantoni 74', 80'; Ludo 85'; Marcel 87'	Report	Bennaars 62'

19 Mayıs Stadium, Ankara
Attendance: 5,000
Referee: Karl Lescart (Belgium)

=== Champion ===
1953 World Military Cup winners

Belgium
Second title
