= KAFAC Sports Complex =

Stadium in Mungyeong, South Korea

- Location: 101, sangmu-ro, Hogye-myun, Mungyeong, South Korea
- Operator: Republic of Korea Armed Forces
- Capacity: 10,000
- Surface: Grass, Tartan track
- Field size: 7,865 m^{2} (Running track: 400 m x 8 lane)

Tenant
- Korea Armed Forces Athletic Corps

The KAFAC Stadium is a multi-purpose stadium in Mungyeong, Korea, used for track and field and association football. It was the main stadium for the 2015 Military World Games and is the home stadium of the Korea Armed Forces Athletic Corps, after which it is named. For the 2015 games it hosted the opening ceremony and both the football and track and field competitions. It has a seating capacity of 10,000.
