= Mynavi Sendai =

Mynavi Sendai Ladies マイナビ仙台レディース
- Full name: Mynavi Sendai Ladies
- Nickname: MySendai
- Founded: 2012
- Ground: Yurtec Stadium Sendai
- Capacity: 19,694
- Chairman: Kazuaki Shinoda
- Manager: Futoshi Ikeda
- League: WE League
- 2025–26: 5th
- Website: https://www.mynavisendai-ladies.jp
| Home colours | Away colours |

Mynavi Sendai Ladies (マイナビ仙台レディース) is a women's professional football club playing in Japan's WE League. Its hometown is Sendai.

== Kits ==
=== Kit suppliers and shirt sponsors ===
| Period | Kit manufacturer | Shirt sponsor (chest) | Shirt sponsor (sleeve) |
|---|---|---|---|
| 2021–2022 | X-girl | Mynavi | The 77 Bank |
| 2022–2023 | X-girl | Mynavi | The 77 Bank |
| 2023–2024 | X-girl | Mynavi | The 77 Bank |
| 2024–2025 | X-girl | Mynavi | The 77 Bank |
| 2025–2026 | X-girl | Mynavi | The 77 Bank |
| 2026–2027 | X-girl | Mynavi | The 77 Bank |

== Stadium ==
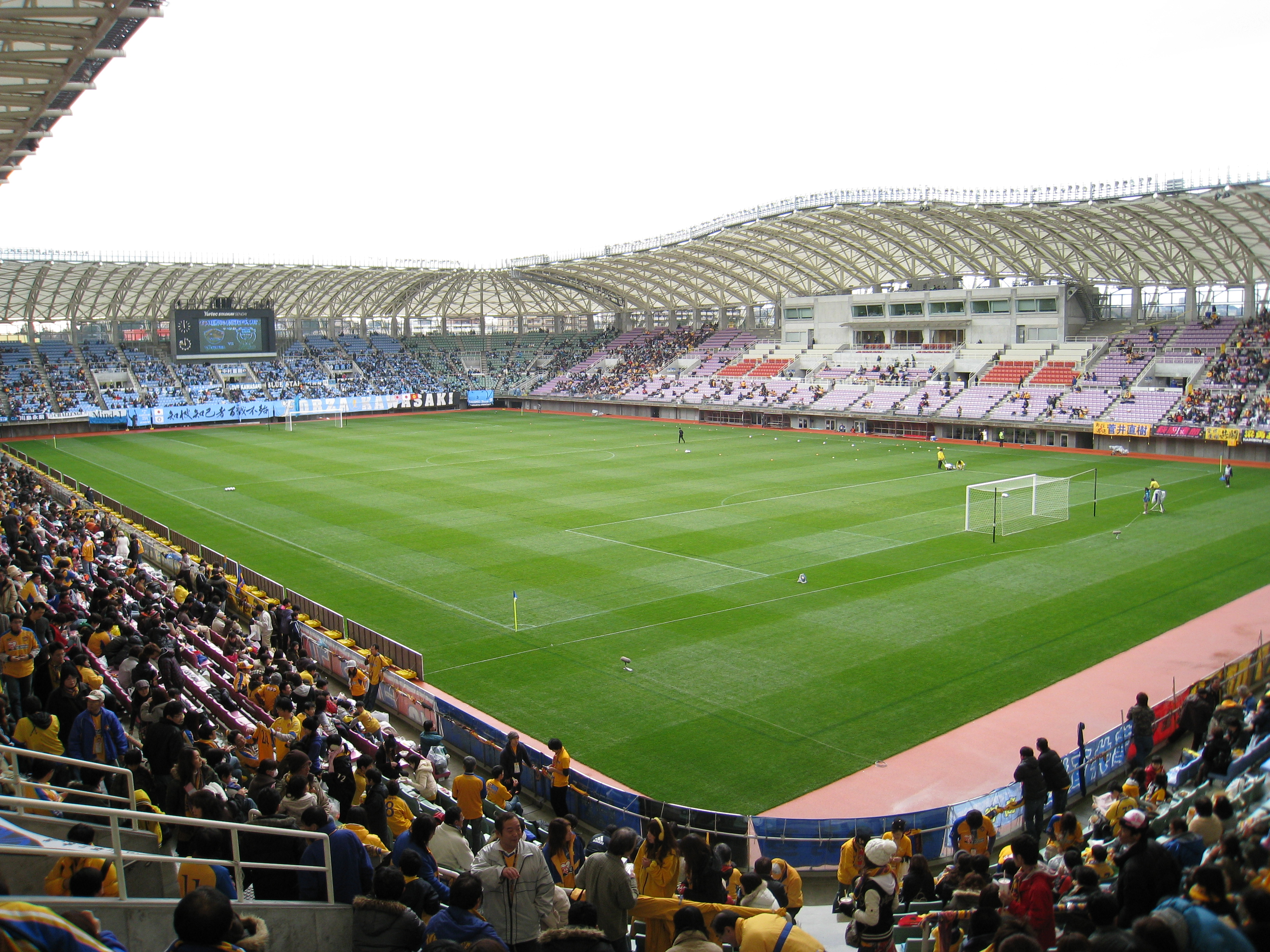
Yurtec Stadium Sendai

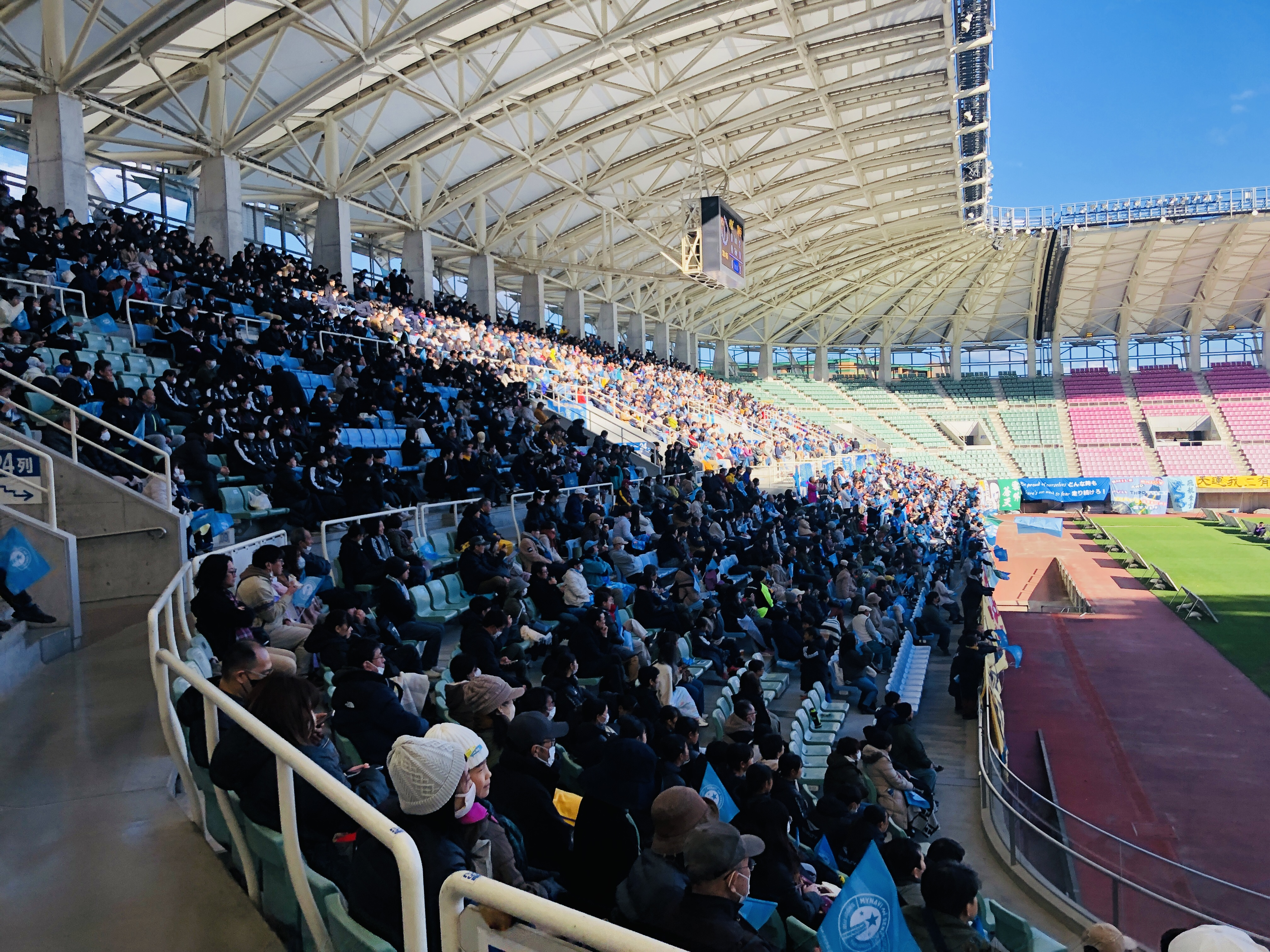
In 2023, Mynavi recorded the highest number of participants in the WE League.

Their home stadium is Yurtec Stadium Sendai, in Izumi-ku, Sendai, although a few home games have also been played at nearby Miyagi Stadium.

Sendai Stadium ranks among the top stadiums in Japan for its presence, comfort, and accessibility, and was once ranked second in an evaluation by a famous Japanese football media. It was also used by Azzurri as a camp site during the 2002 FIFA World Cup.

Miyagi Stadium is famous not only for the Japanese national team, but also for hosting matches of the Argentine national team in the 2002 FIFA World Cup.

In 2022–23, it became the third place in the number of WE-League spectators.

== Mascot ==
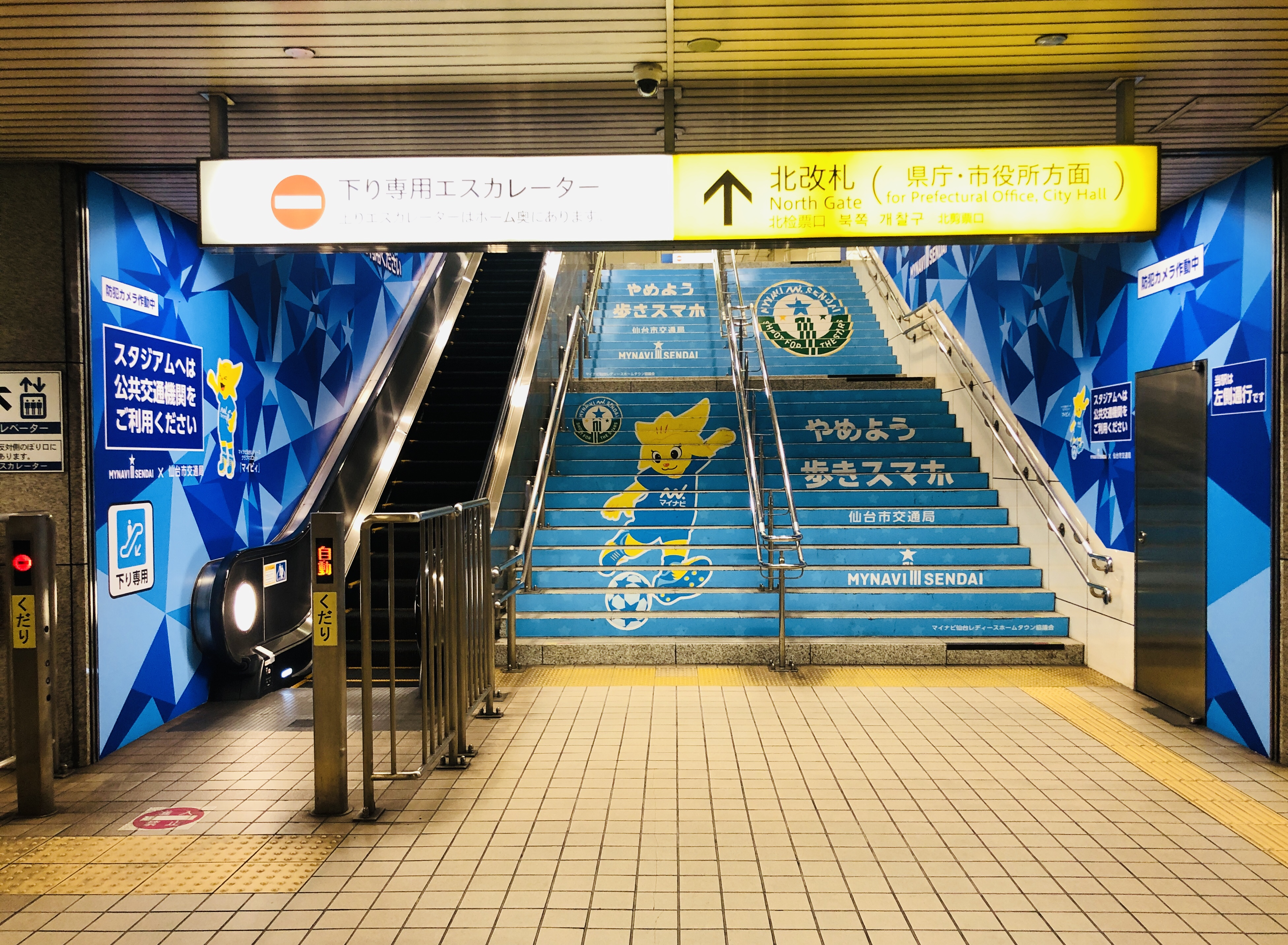
Myviy

=== Myviy ===
- First appearance at the Tokyo Girls Collection in February 2021.
- A girl from Deneb and raised in Sendai. LTAANA and VEGATTA are friends.
- By combining "MY" from My Navi and "V" from Victory, the club named it "Myviy" as an easy-to-call name that will be familiar to many people, including supporters.
- Not a specific animal. A character inspired by the star Deneb, one of the summer triangles. The motif is Mynavi Wave, a moon helmet that is associated with the stars and the city of Sendai.

== Players ==
=== First-team squad ===
As of 6 July 2026.

Note: Flags indicate national team as defined under FIFA eligibility rules; some limited exceptions apply. Players may hold more than one non-FIFA nationality.

| No. | Pos. | Nation | Player |
|---|---|---|---|
| 1 | GK | JPN | Maya Inō |
| 2 | DF | JPN | Akane Nishino |
| 3 | DF | JPN | Nana Kashimura |
| 4 | DF | JPN | Satsuki Miura |
| 6 | MF | JPN | Hina Inoue |
| 7 | MF | JPN | Honoka Shinoda |
| 8 | MF | JPN | Seira Esaki |
| 9 | FW | JPN | Anon Tsuda |
| 10 | MF | JPN | Yume Endo |
| 11 | FW | JPN | Satoko Fujisaki |
| 13 | FW | JPN | Miyu Yakata |

| No. | Pos. | Nation | Player |
|---|---|---|---|
| 14 | DF | JPN | Amane Takahara |
| 15 | GK | JPN | Shiori Shimizu |
| 16 | GK | JPN | Miyu Yokobori |
| 18 | MF | JPN | Nīna Sato |
| 19 | DF | JPN | Nonoha Abe |
| 20 | MF | JPN | Hana Kikuchi |
| 21 | DF | JPN | Kotomi Iwaki |
| 22 | DF | JPN | Kokoro Yoshioka |
| 25 | MF | JPN | Moe Ōta |
| 28 | DF | JPN | Mīna Matsunaga |
| 50 | FW | JPN | Miyu Matsui |

=== Notable players ===
- (Japan) Aya Sameshima (2012–2014)
- (Japan) Nana Ichise (2016–2023)
- (Australia) Caitlin Foord (2017)
- (Australia) Katrina Gorry (2017)
- (Japan) Mamiko Matsumoto (2020–2024)
- (Japan) Fūka Nagano (2021)
- (Japan) Hinata Miyazawa (2021–2023, 2023 FIFA Women's World Cup Golden Boot)
- (Japan) Emi Nakajima (2022–2025)
- (Japan) Manaka Matsukubo (2023, Youngest hat-trick in NWSL)

== Club staff ==
| Position | Name |
|---|---|
| Manager | (Japan) Futoshi Ikeda |
| Head Coach | (Japan) Yuiko Konno |
| Technical Coach | (Japan) Keita Karino |
| Goalkeeper Coach | (Japan) Takuya Ueno |
| Physical Coach | (Japan) Takumi Yamada |
| Medical Chief | (Japan) Satomi Hiyama |
| Trainer | (Japan) Yoshiaki Kato |
| Trainer | (Japan) Kaede Ymaguchi |
| Manager | (Japan) Mizuki Oda |
| Registered Dietitian | (Japan) Ryu Umetsu |

=== Managerial history ===
| Dates | Name |
|---|---|
| 2012–2016 | Yasunobu Chiba |
| 2017–2018.6 | Kazuo Echigo |
| 2018.6–2018.12 | Yasunobu Chiba |
| 2019–2020 | Keiju Karashima |
| 2021–2023.5 | Takeo Matsuda |
| 2023.5-2024.4 | Shigemitsu Sudo |
| 2024.4-2026.5 | Jun Sunaga |
| 2026.6–present | Futoshi Ikeda |

== Honours ==
=== Team awards ===
- Nadeshiko League Division 1
  - Runners-up (1): 2015
- Nadeshiko League Division 2
  - Winners (1): 2012
- WE League
  - Special prize (1) : 2022–23
  - MOST IMPRESSIVE WE ACTION DAY (1) : 2025–26
  - GRASS ROOTS AWARD (1) : 2025–26
- Empress's Cup
  - Fair-play award (3) : 2015, 2016, 2020

=== Individual awards ===
- Valuable Player Award
  - (Japan) Fūka Nagano (Japan) Hinata Miyazawa: 2021–22
  - (Japan) Hinata Miyazawa (Japan) Manaka Matsukubo: 2022–23
- WE League Defence of the Month
  - (Japan) Satsuki Miura: October 2025

== Season-by-season records ==
Seasons of MyNavi Sendai Ladies
| Season | Domestic League | | | | Empress's Cup | WE League Cup |
| Season | League | Level | Place | Tms. | Empress's Cup | WE League Cup |
|---|---|---|---|---|---|---|
| 2012 | Challenge League | 2 | Champions | 12 | Third round | — |
| 2013 | Nadeshiko League | 1 | 5th | 10 | Quarter-finals | Group stage |
| 2014 | Nadeshiko League | 1 | 7th | 10 | Semi-finals | — |
| 2015 | Nadeshiko League Division 1 | 1 | 2nd | 10 | Semi-finals | — |
| 2016 | Nadeshiko League Division 1 | 1 | 4th | 10 | Semi-finals | Semi-finals |
| 2017 | Nadeshiko League Division 1 | 1 | 4th | 10 | Quarter-finals | Group stage |
| 2018 | Nadeshiko League Division 1 | 1 | 8th | 10 | Quarter-finals | Group stage |
| 2019 | Nadeshiko League Division 1 | 1 | 8th | 10 | Quarter-finals | Group stage |
| 2020 | Nadeshiko League Division 1 | 1 | 7th | 10 | Semi-finals | — |
| 2021–22 | WE League | 1 | 5th | 11 | Fourth round | — |
| 2022–23 | WE League | 1 | 4th | 11 | Fourth round | Group stage |
| 2023–24 | WE League | 1 | 10th | 12 | Quarter-finals | Group stage |
| 2024–25 | WE League | 1 | 12th | 12 | Quarter-finals | Group stage |
| 2025–26 | WE League | 1 | 5th | 12 | Third round | Group stage |

== Parent company ==
Mynavi Corporation

== Transition of team name ==
- Vegalta Sendai Ladies: (2012–2016)
- Mynavi Vegalta Sendai Ladies: (2017–2020)
- Mynavi Sendai Ladies: (2021–present)

== See also ==
- Japan Football Association (JFA)
- List of women's football clubs in Japan
- Vegalta Sendai (former parent company)
