= 2005 World Men's Military Cup =

Tournament details
- Host country: Germany
- City: Warendorf
- Teams: 11
- Venues: 4 (in 1 host city)

Final positions
- Champions: Egypt (5th title)
- Runners-up: Algeria
- Third place: Qatar
- Fourth place: Germany

Tournament statistics
- Matches played: 19
- Goals scored: 42 (2.21 per match)

The 2005 World Military Cup took place in Warendorf, Germany. The Tournament is also known as CISM World Football Trophy.

== Group stage ==
=== Group A ===
13 July 2005

Algeria	1–2	Greece

15 July 2005

Greece	0–2	Algeria

Team	Pld	W	D	L	GF	GA	GD	Pts
Algeria	2	1	0	1	3	2	+1	3
Greece	2	1	0	1	2	3	–1	3
Syria	Cancelled							

=== Group B ===
Team	Pld	W	D	L	GF	GA	GD	Pts
Qatar	2	1	1	0	2	1	+1	4
Egypt	2	0	2	0	1	1	0	2
Ukraine	2	0	1	1	0	1	–1	1

13 July 2005

Egypt	0–0	Ukraine

15 July 2005

Qatar	1–0	Ukraine

17 July 2005

Egypt	1–1	Qatar

=== Group C ===
Team	Pld	W	D	L	GF	GA	GD	Pts
Germany	2	2	0	0	2	0	+1	6
Mali	2	1	0	1	3	1	+2	3
Brazil	2	0	0	2	0	4	–4	0

12 July 2005

Germany	1–0	Mali

15 July 2005

Brazil	0–3	Mali

17 July 2005

Germany	1–0	Brazil

=== Group D ===
Team	Pld	W	D	L	GF	GA	GD	Pts
Italy	2	2	0	0	5	2	+3	6
Lithuania	2	1	0	1	2	2	0	3
Barbados	2	0	0	2	1	4	–3	0

12 July 2005

Italy	3–1	Barbados

15 July 2005

Italy	2–1	Lithuania

17 July 2005

Lithuania	1–0	Barbados

=== Quarterfinals ===
21 June 2005

Algeria	1–0	Mali

21 June 2005

Qatar	1–2	Lithuania

22 June 2005

Germany	2–1	Greece

22 June 2005

Italy	0–2	Egypt

=== Semifinals ===
23 June 2005

Algeria	3–2	Qatar

23 June 2005

Germany	0–2	Egypt

=== Third place match ===
25 June 2005

Germany	1–3	Qatar

=== Final ===
27 July 2005

Algeria	0–1	Egypt

== Winner ==
2005 World Men's Military Cup

Egypt
5th title
