= World Military Cup =

- Founded: 1946
- Region: International (CISM)
- Current champions: M: Bahrain (2019); W: South Korea (2023)
- Most championships: Men: Italy (8 titles); Women: Brazil (5 titles)
- 2019 Military World Games

The World Military Cup is an international association football competition contested by national military teams. Organized by the International Military Sports Council (CISM), the tournament was first held in 1946 under the title World Military Championship. The name was changed to the World Military Cup ahead of the 2001 edition.

In 1995, the Military World Games—a multi-sport event for military personnel—was established, and the football championship became an integrated discipline within the Games. Despite this integration, the football tournament continues to be organized as a standalone biennial event under CISM governance.

A counterpart competition for women, the World Military Women's Championship, was established in 2001. Both tournaments remain key fixtures in CISM's sporting calendar, promoting camaraderie and sportsmanship among armed forces globally.

== History ==
The inaugural World Military Championship was hosted in Prague, Czechoslovakia (now Czech Republic) in 1946, organized by the Armed Forces Sports Council (AFSC). In 1948, the AFSC was restructured and renamed the International Military Sports Council (CISM), which has governed the competition since. Great Britain won the first title, defeating host nation Czechoslovakia in the final, where the latter finished as runners-up.

== Format ==
Since 2013, the World Military Cup has been restructured into two distinct competitions. The CISM World Football Cup, held on a four-year cycle, debuted in its current format in 2013. Its second edition took place from 23 to 28 January 2017 in Muscat, Oman.

Separately, the Military World Games—a multi-sport event organized by the International Military Sports Council (CISM)—features a football tournament branded as the Military World Championship. This competition also follows a four-year cycle, running concurrently with the Games.

== Qualifications ==
Teams qualify for the World Military Cup through continental tournaments organized by each confederation under CISM governance. The qualifying competitions are as follows:

Confederation	Championship
Asia	Asian Military Qualifying Tournament
Africa	African Military Cup
Americas	Americas Military Cup
Europe	European Military Qualifying Tournament

These tournaments determine the regional representatives for the final World Military Cup event.

== Results ==
=== Men ===
==== Military World Championship ====
A football tournament has been held as part of the Military World Games every four years since 1995. This competition is recognized as part of the World Military Championship.

Year	Host	Final			Third Place Match		
Year	Host	Champions	Score	Runners-Up	Third Place	Score	Fourth Place
1946; Details	(Czech Republic) Prague	United Kingdom		Czechoslovakia	Belgium		
1947; Details	(Germany) Hanover	Belgium		Netherlands	Denmark		
1948; Details	(Denmark) Copenhagen	France		Belgium	Denmark		Luxembourg
1949; Details	(France) Lille / Paris	France	3–1	Turkey	Belgium	3–1	Netherlands
1950; Details	(Netherlands) The Hague	Italy	2–1	Belgium	France	4–4 (France win on corners)	Netherlands
1951; Details	(Egypt) Cairo	Italy	3–1	Egypt	France	3–1	Belgium
1952; Details	(Greece) Athens	Greece	3–2	Belgium	Netherlands	1–0	Turkey
1953; Details	(Turkey) Ankara / Istanbul ^{1}	Belgium	^{n/a}	Turkey	Greece		
1954; Details	(Belgium) Brussels	Belgium	5–1	Turkey	Portugal	1–0	France
1955; Details	(Italy) Rome	Turkey	^{n/a}	Italy	Egypt	^{n/a}	Netherlands
1956; Details	(Portugal) Lisbon	Italy	^{n/a}	Portugal	Egypt	^{n/a}	Turkey
1957; Details	(Argentina) Buenos Aires	France	^{n/a}	Argentina	Italy	^{n/a}	Brazil
1958; Details	(Portugal) Lisbon	Portugal	2–1	France	Netherlands	4–3	Belgium
1959; Details	(Italy) Florence ^{1}	Italy	^{n/a}	Portugal	France		
1960; Details	(France) Oran ^{2}	Belgium	^{n/a}	Turkey	Greece	^{n/a}	France
1961; Details	(Turkey) Ankara	Turkey	^{n/a}	Greece	France	^{n/a}	Netherlands
1962; Details	(South Korea) Seoul	Greece	1st leg: 3–1; 2nd leg: 1–2	South Korea	Turkey		
1963; Details	(Greece) Athens / Saloniki	Greece	^{n/a}	Belgium	France and Turkey		
1964; Details	(Turkey) Ankara / Istanbul	France	^{n/a}	Turkey	West Germany and Netherlands		
1965; Details	(Spain) Gijón	Spain	3–0	Turkey	Morocco	2–1	Belgium
1966; Details	(Morocco) Rabat	Turkey	1st leg: 2–1; 2nd leg: 0–0	Morocco	Netherlands and Spain		
1967; Details	(Belgium) Brussels	Turkey	^{n/a}	Belgium	Morocco and Netherlands		
1968; Details	(Iraq) Baghdad	Greece	4–1	Turkey	Netherlands and Spain		
1969; Details	(Greece) Athens	Greece	w/o	Algeria	Iran	1–1	South Korea
1972; Details	(Iraq) Baghdad	Iraq	^{n/a}	Italy	Greece	^{n/a}	Turkey
1973; Details	(Republic of the Congo) Brazzaville	Italy	^{n/a}	Iraq	Kuwait	^{n/a}	Congo
1975; Details	(West Germany) Hagen	West Germany	1–0	Netherlands	Kuwait	6–5 (a.e.t.)	Cameroon
1977; Details	(Syria) Damascus	Iraq	0–0 (5–4 p)	Kuwait	Italy	3–1 (a.e.t.)	France
1979; Details	Kuwait City	Iraq	0–0 (4–3 p)	Italy	Kuwait	3–1	Austria
1981; Details	(Qatar) Doha	Kuwait	1–0	Qatar	Syria	2–0	France
1983; Details	Kuwait City	Kuwait	2–0	Belgium			
1987; Details	(Italy) Arezzo	Italy	2–0	West Germany	Egypt	4–1	Belgium
1989; Details	(Italy) Caserta	Italy	3–0	Morocco	Belgium	1–0	United Arab Emirates
1991; Details	(Netherlands) Arnhem / Apeldoorn	Italy	3–3 (a.e.t.) (5–4 p)	Germany	Turkey	1–0	France
1993; Details	(Morocco) Rabat	Egypt	3–2 (a.e.t.)	Morocco	Germany	3–0	France
1995; Details	(Italy) Rome *	France	1–0	Iran	South Korea	1–0	Cyprus
1997; Details	(Iran) Tehran	Greece	1–0	Italy	France	3–2 (a.e.t.)	Burkina Faso
1999; Details	(Croatia) Zagreb *	Egypt	3–3 (5–4 p)	Greece	Croatia	2–0	Germany
2001; Details	(Egypt) Cairo	Egypt	3–0	Greece	North Korea	5–0	Guinea
2003; Details	(Italy) Catania *	North Korea	3–2	Egypt	Italy	3–2	Lithuania
2005; Details	(Germany) Warendorf	Egypt	1–0	Algeria	Qatar	3–1	Germany
2007; Details	(India) Hyderabad *	Egypt	2–0	Cameroon	North Korea	2–0	Qatar
2011; Details	(Brazil) Rio de Janeiro *	Algeria	1–0	Egypt	Brazil	1–0 (a.e.t.)	Qatar
2015; Details	(South Korea) Mungyeong *	Algeria	2–0 (a.e.t.)	Oman	South Korea	3–2	Egypt
2019; Details	(China) Wuhan *	Bahrain	3–1	Qatar	Algeria	4–0	North Korea

- ^n/a Round-robin tournament determined final standings.
- ^n1 Only three teams in the final group.
- ^n2 Tournament held in French Algeria.
- * Event integrated into the Military World Games.

==== CISM World Football Cup ====
Year	Host	Final			Third Place Match		
Year	Host	Champions	Score	Runners-Up	Third Place	Score	Fourth Place
2013; Details	(Azerbaijan) Baku	Iraq	3–2	Oman	Ivory Coast	1–0	Azerbaijan
2017; Details	(Oman) Muscat	Oman	0–0 (4–1 p)	Qatar	Syria	2 – 2 (6–5 p)	Egypt

==== Teams reaching the top four ====
Team	Titles	Runners-up	Third place	Fourth place	Total
Italy	8 (1950, 1951, 1956, 1959, 1973, 1987, 1989, 1991)	4 (1955, 1972, 1979, 1997)	3 (1957, 1977, 2003)	—	15
Greece	6 (1952, 1962, 1963, 1968, 1969, 1997)	3 (1961, 1999, 2001)	3 (1953, 1960, 1972)	—	12
Egypt	5 (1993, 1999, 2001, 2005, 2007)	3 (1951, 2003, 2011)	3 (1955, 1956, 1987)	2 (2015, 2017)	13
France	5 (1948, 1949, 1957, 1964, 1995)	1 (1958)	6 (1950, 1951, 1959, 1961, 1963, 1997)	6 (1954, 1960, 1977, 1981, 1991, 1993)	18
Turkey	4 (1955, 1961, 1966, 1967)	7 (1949, 1953, 1954, 1960, 1964, 1965, 1968)	2 (1962, 1991)	4 (1952, 1956, 1963, 1972)	17
Belgium	4 (1947, 1953, 1954, 1960)	6 (1948, 1950, 1952, 1963, 1967, 1983)	3 (1946, 1949, 1989)	4 (1951, 1958, 1965, 1987)	14
Iraq	4 (1972, 1977, 1979, 2013)	1 (1973)	—	—	5
Algeria	2 (2011, 2015)	2 (1969, 2005)	1 (2019)	—	5
Kuwait	2 (1981, 1983)	1 (1977)	3 (1973, 1975, 1979)	—	6
Germany	1 (1975)	2 (1987, 1991)	2 (1964, 1993)	2 (1999, 2005)	7
Portugal	1 (1958)	2 (1956, 1959)	1 (1954)	—	4
Oman	1 (2017)	2 (2013, 2015)	—	—	3
North Korea	1 (2003)	—	2 (2001, 2007)	1 (2019)	4
Spain	1 (1965)	—	—	2 (1966, 1968)	3
Bahrain	1 (2019)	—	—	—	1
England	1 (1946)	—	—	—	1
Morocco	—	3 (1966, 1989, 1993)	2 (1965, 1967)	—	5
Qatar	—	3 (1981, 2017, 2019)	1 (2005)	2 (2007, 2011)	6
Netherlands	—	2 (1947, 1975)	4 (1952, 1958, 1966, 1968)	6 (1949, 1950, 1955, 1961, 1964, 1967)	12
Iran	—	1 (1995)	1 (1969)	—	2
South Korea	—	1 (1962)	2 (1995, 2015)	—	3
Cameroon	—	1 (2007)	—	1 (1975)	2
Argentina	—	1 (1957)	—	—	1
Czechoslovakia	—	1 (1946)	—	—	1
Denmark	—	—	2 (1947, 1948)	—	2
Syria	—	—	2 (1981, 2017)	—	2
Brazil	—	—	1 (2011)	1 (1957)	2
Croatia	—	—	1 (1999)	—	1
Ivory Coast	—	—	1 (2013)	—	1
Austria	—	—	—	1 (1979)	1
Congo	—	—	—	1 (1973)	1
Cyprus	—	—	—	1 (1995)	1
Guinea	—	—	—	1 (2001)	1
Lithuania	—	—	—	1 (2003)	1
Luxembourg	—	—	—	1 (1948)	1
United Arab Emirates	—	—	—	1 (1989)	1
Burkina Faso	—	—	—	1 (1997)	1
Azerbaijan	—	—	—	1 (2013)	1

=== Women ===
Year	Host nation	Final			Third Place Match		
Year	Host nation	Winner	Score	Second Place	Third Place	Score	Fourth Place
2001; Details	Netherlands	Germany	^{n/a}	Netherlands	England	^{n/a}	Canada
2002; Details	(Canada) Kingston	United States	1–0	Germany	Netherlands	4–0	Canada
2003; Details	(Germany) Warendorf	Germany	7–3	Netherlands	United States	1–0	Canada
2004; Details	(United States) Fort Eustis	Netherlands	3–0 (a.e.t.)	Germany	United States	3–1	Canada
2006; Details	(Netherlands) Assen	Netherlands	2–0	United States	Germany	6–4 (a.e.t.)	France
2007; Details	(India) Hyderabad *	North Korea	5–0	Germany	France	1–0	Netherlands
2008; Details	(Netherlands) Ede	Germany	3–0	France	Netherlands	2–1	South Korea
2009; Details	(United States) Biloxi	Brazil	1–0	South Korea	Netherlands	2–1	France
2010; Details	(France) Cherbourg-Octeville	Brazil	1–0	South Korea	France	2–1	Netherlands
2011; Details	(Brazil) Rio de Janeiro *	Brazil	5–0	Germany	Netherlands	2–0	France
2012; Details	(Germany) Warendorf	Germany	1–0	South Korea	Brazil	2–0	France
2015; Details	(South Korea) Mungyeong *	Brazil	2–1 (a.e.t.)	France	South Korea	3–0	Netherlands
2016; Details	France	France	2–1	Brazil	South Korea	3–3 (a.e.t.) (4–3 p)	Cameroon
2018; Details	(United States) Fort Bliss	Brazil	3–2	South Korea	China	3–1	France
2019; Details	(China) Wuhan *	North Korea	2–1	China	Brazil	3–1	South Korea
2020	(Cameroon) Yaoundé	Cancelled			Cancelled		
2022; Details	(United States) Spokane	France	2–1	Cameroon	South Korea	3–0	United States
2023; Details	(Netherlands) Bunschoten-Spakenburg	South Korea	1–0	France	Cameroon	4–0	Netherlands
2025	(North Korea) Pyongyang (Note: The Women's World Football Cup in Pyongyang was postponed by one year to 2025, but the tournament was ultimately not held.)	Cancelled			Cancelled		
2027; Details	(United States) Charlotte						

- ^n/a Round-robin tournament determined final standings.
- * Event integrated into the Military World Games.

==== Teams reaching the top four ====
Team	Titles	Runners-up	Third place	Fourth place	Total
Brazil	5 (2009, 2010, 2011, 2015, 2018)	1 (2016)	2 (2012, 2019)	—	8
Germany	4 (2001, 2003, 2008, 2012)	4 (2002, 2004, 2007, 2011)	1 (2006)	—	9
France	2 (2016, 2022)	3 (2008, 2015, 2023)	2 (2007, 2010)	5 (2006, 2009, 2011, 2012, 2018)	12
Netherlands	2 (2004, 2006)	2 (2001, 2003)	4 (2002, 2008, 2009, 2011)	4 (2007, 2010, 2015, 2023)	12
North Korea	2 (2007, 2019)	—	—	—	2
South Korea	1 (2023)	4 (2009, 2010, 2012, 2018)	3 (2015, 2016, 2022)	2 (2008, 2019)	10
United States	1 (2002)	1 (2006)	2 (2003, 2004)	1 (2022)	5
Cameroon	—	1 (2022)	1 (2023)	1 (2016)	3
China	—	1 (2019)	1 (2018)	—	2
England	—	—	1 (2001)	—	1
Canada	—	—	—	4 (2001, 2002, 2003, 2004)	4

== See also ==
- International Military Sports Council
- Football at the Military World Games
- African Military Cup
- Americas Military Cup
