= Akane Nishino =

Japanese association football player

Personal information
- Date of birth: 4 February 2002 (age 24)
- Place of birth: Toyama Prefecture, Japan
- Height: 1.63 m (5 ft 4 in)
- Position: Midfielder

Team information
- Current team: MyNavi Sendai Ladies
- Number: 26

Youth career
- 2017-2019: Tokiwagi Gakuen

Senior career*
Years	Team	Apps	(Gls)
2020-	MyNavi Sendai	9	(0)
- * Club domestic league appearances and goals

Akane Nishino (born 4 February 2002) is a Japanese professional footballer who plays as a midfielder for WE League club MyNavi Sendai Ladies.

== Club career ==
Nishino made her WE League debut on 18 September 2021.
