= Satsuki Miura =

Japanese association football player

Personal information
- Date of birth: 16 June 1996 (age 30)
- Place of birth: Tokyo Prefecture, Japan
- Height: 1.63 m (5 ft 4 in)
- Position: Defender

Team information
- Current team: Mynavi Sendai
- Number: 4

Senior career*
Years	Team	Apps	(Gls)
2020–2024	Albirex Niigata	1	(0)
2024–2025	Tokyo Verdy Beleza		
2025–	Mynavi Sendai		
- * Club domestic league appearances and goals

Satsuki Miura (born 16 June 1996) is a Japanese professional footballer who plays as a defender for WE League club Mynavi Sendai.

== Club career ==
Miura made her WE League debut on 12 September 2021.
