= Football at the 2015 Military World Games =

Tournament details
- Host country: South Korea
- City: Mungyeong
- Dates: 30 September – 10 October
- Teams: 16 (from 6 confederations)
- Venue: 6 (in 5 host cities)

Final positions
- Champions: Algeria (men); Brazil (women)
- Runners-up: Oman (men); France (women)
- Third place: South Korea (men); South Korea (women)

Football at the 2015 Military World Games is held in Mungyeong, South Korea from 30 September to 10 October. The competition is also considered as a part of the World Military Cup.

== Venues ==
Below the list of different venues of the football tournament.

Mungyeong	Football at the 2015 Military World Games (South Korea)	Gimcheon
KAFAC Sports Complex	Football at the 2015 Military World Games (South Korea)	Gimcheon Sports Complex
Capacity: 10,000	Football at the 2015 Military World Games (South Korea)	Capacity: 25,000
Andong	Football at the 2015 Military World Games (South Korea)	Sangju
Andong Civic Stadium	Football at the 2015 Military World Games (South Korea)	Sangju Civic Stadium
Capacity: 17,500	Football at the 2015 Military World Games (South Korea)	Capacity: 15,042
Yeongju	Football at the 2015 Military World Games (South Korea)	Mungyeong
Yeongju Civic Stadium	Football at the 2015 Military World Games (South Korea)	Mungyeong Civic Stadium
Capacity: 15,000	Football at the 2015 Military World Games (South Korea)	Capacity: 15,023

== Medal summary ==
=== Results ===
Event	Gold	Silver	Bronze
Men	Algeria	Oman	South Korea
Women	Brazil	France	South Korea

=== Medal table ===
Rank	Nation	Gold	Silver	Bronze	Total
1	Algeria	1	0	0	1
1	Brazil	1	0	0	1
3	France	0	1	0	1
3	Oman	0	1	0	1
5	South Korea	0	0	2	2
Totals (5 entries)		2	2	2	6
