= Juri Kawano =

Japanese footballer

Personal information
- Full name: 河野朱里
- Date of birth: 16 December 1996 (age 29)
- Place of birth: Kanagawa Prefecture, Japan
- Height: 1.60 m (5 ft 3 in)
- Position: Forward

Team information
- Current team: NHK Spring Yokohama FC Seagulls
- Number: 32

Senior career*
Years	Team	Apps	(Gls)
2019	INAC Kobe Leonessa	12	(2)
2020–2023	Chifure AS Elfen Saitama	48	(8)
2023–	NHK Spring Yokohama FC Seagulls	33	(17)

International career
- Japan U20
- * Club domestic league appearances and goals

Juri Kawano (born 16 December 1996) is a Japanese professional footballer who plays as a forward for Nadeshiko League Division 1 club NHK Spring Yokohama FC Seagulls. She is a former WE League player.

== College football ==
Kawano played for the Waseda University's football team and is their key player. In 2015, she scored two goals as a first-year student in the 2015 All Japan Women's University Football Championship. That year, she achieved a treble, winning the Kanto University Women's Soccer League, Kanto Women's Soccer League, and Kanto Women's Soccer Championship.In a media interview, it was revealed that she started playing football because of influence from her father and brother.

In the 2017 Empress's Cup, she led Waseda against the professional team INAC Kobe Leonessa and scored a decisive goal, helping Waseda eliminate the professional team from the competition.

In 2018, she led Waseda to win the Kanto University Women's Soccer League again, scoring 18 goals in the process, and became the top scorer in the league. She was described as an ace striker by 4years, an affiliate media of Asahi Shimbun focusing on high school and college sports.

== Club career ==
Upon graduation from Waseda University, Kawano joined INAC Kobe Leonessa in 2019. She played and scored in the Nadeshiko League Cup, helping the team reach the cup final.

In 2020, Kawano joined Chifure AS Elfen Saitama. She played in Saitama for three seasons, making 48 appearances and scoring 8 goals.

In July 2023, Kawano moved to NHK Spring Yokohama FC Seagulls. As of mid-September 2025, she made 33 appearances for the team and scored 17 goals.

== International career ==
Kawano is a representative of Japan under-20 national team and played as a target person in the 2016 FIFA U-20 Women's World Cup, where Japan won the third place. She was selected to the U20 team because of her performance in the college team, and has to play among profession players who came from professional football club.

In 2017, she was once again selected as Japan's U20 football representative in the 2017 Summer Universiade, and led the team to the final, scoring a hat trick during the match against Columbia, and finishing second place.
