= Shiori =

- Pronunciation: Shí-ó-rí
- Gender: Female
- Language: Japanese

Origin
- Origin: Japanese
- Meaning: 栞, "bookmark / guide" 撓, "lithe", 詩織, "poem, weave" 史織, "history, weave"
- Region of origin: Japan

Shiori (しおり, シオリ) is a Japanese feminine given name.

== Written forms ==
Shiori can be written using different kanji characters and can mean:

- 栞, "bookmark / guide"
- 撓, "lithe"
- 詩織, "poem, weave"
- 汐里, ''tide, village''

The name can also be written in hiragana or katakana.

== People with the name ==
- Shiori Asahi (旭 志織, born 1978), Japanese wrestler
- Shiori Hirata (born 1999), Japanese sports shooter
- Shiori Ino (猪野 詩織), 21-year-old Japanese female university student who was murdered in October 1999
- Shiori Itō (伊藤 詩織; born 1989), Japanese journalist
- Shiori Izawa (井澤 詩織), Japanese voice actress
- Shiori Kaneko, Japanese actress and former member idol group SKE48
- Shiori Kamisaki, former Japanese AV actress
- Shiori Kamimachi (上町 史織; born 1981), Japanese team handball player
- Shiori Kanzaki (神崎 詩織; born 1987), Japanese actress
- Shiori Kinoshita (木下 栞; born 1992), Japanese professional footballer
- Shiori Koike (小池 詩織; born 1993), Japanese ice hockey player
- Shiori Koseki (小関 しおり), Japanese Olympic softball player
- Shioli Kutsuna (忽那 汐里, born 1992), Japanese actress
- Shiori Mikami (三上 枝織), Japanese voice actress
- Shiori Miyake (三宅 史織; born 1995), Japanese women's footballer
- Shiori Murakoso (born 1996), Japanese professional footballer
- Shiori Nagata (永田 しおり; born 1987), Japanese handball player
- Shiori Niiyama (新山 詩織), Japanese singer and songwriter
- Shiori Nishida (西田 汐里, born 2003), Japanese singer, idol
- Shiori Ogiso (小木曽汐莉, born 1992), Japanese YouTuber and former member of the female idol group SKE48
- Shiori Saito (齋藤 栞; born 1998), Japanese badminton player
- Shiori Sato (佐藤 栞; born 1990), Japanese model
- Shiori Sekine (関根 史織), Japanese musician, vocalist, and the only female member of Base Ball Bear
- Shiori Shimizu (清水 栞; born 1996), Japanese professional footballer
- Shiori Tamai (玉井 詩織), Japanese singer, idol
- Shiori Yamao (山尾 志桜里; born 1974), Japanese politician
- Shiori Yamashita (山下 栞; born 2002), Japanese ice hockey player

== Fictional characters ==
- Shiori (紫織 しおり), from the anime series InuYasha
- Shiori Akino (秋野 詩織), from the anime and manga series Death Note
- Shiori Asagiri (朝霧 史織), from the anime series Tamako Market
- Shiori Fujisaki (藤崎 詩織), the protagonist of the video game Tokimeki Memorial
- Shiori Hiraki, a character from Ultraman Nexus
- Shiori Hirose, a character from Kamen Rider Blade
- Shiori Ichinose, from the anime series Special 7: Special Crime Investigation Unit
- Shiori Kazami (風見 栞), from the anime Bakugan Battle Brawlers
- Shiori Kitano (キタノ シオリ), from the 2003 film Battle Royale II: Requiem
- Shiori Minamino (remarried as Shiori Hatanaka), from the YuYu Hakusho series
- Shiori Misaka (美坂 栞), from the anime and visual novel Kanon
- Shiori Nakamura (中村 しおり), from the Yo-kai Watch franchise
- Shiori Novella (シオリ・ノヴェラ), a member of the Hololive Production English branch
- Shiori Sakita, from the drama Maō
- Shiori Shiomiya (汐宮 栞), from the anime and manga series Kami nomi zo Shiru Sekai
- Shiori Takatsuki (高槻 枝織), a character from the anime series Revolutionary Girl Utena
- Shiori Tsukishima, from the anime and manga series Midori Days
- Shiori Tsuzuki (都築 栞), from the anime series Witchblade
- Shiori Yumeoji, a character in the Revue Starlight franchise
