= African Military Cup =

- Founded: 1994
- Region: Africa (OMSA)
- Teams: 8
- Current champions: Mali (2012)
- Most championships: Burkina Faso; Cameroon; Egypt (2 titles)

The African Military Cup, also known as the Blaise Comparoé Trophy, is a football competition for national military teams in Africa, and was first held in 1994. It is organized by Organisation of Military Sport in Africa (OSMA), a branch of the International Military Sports Council. In French-speaking countries it is also known as CAMFOOT (Coupe d'Afrique Militaire de Football).
The tournament acts as qualification for the World Military Cup or the World Military Games.

== Results ==
| Year | Host | Final | | | Third Place Match |
| Year | Host | Champion | Score | Second Place | Third Place | Score | Fourth Place |
|---|---|---|---|---|---|---|---|
| 1994 | Ouagadougou (Burkina Faso) | Burkina Faso | 2 – 1 | Mali | Ivory Coast | 2 – 1 a.e.t. | Senegal |
| 1997 | Kigali (Rwanda) | Burkina Faso | 2 – 1 | Rwanda | Uganda | N/A | Mali |
| 1998 | Labé (Guinea) | Egypt | 3 – 2 | Guinea | Burkina Faso | N/A | Morocco |
| 2001 | Yamoussoukro (Ivory Coast) | Guinea | 2 – 1 | Ivory Coast | Burkina Faso | N/A | Rwanda |
| 2004 | Bamako (Mali) | Egypt | 1 – 0 a.e.t. | Mali | Algeria | 4 – 2 | Guinea |
| 2006 | Yaoundé (Cameroon) | Cameroon | 1 – 0 | Mali | Guinea | 0 – 0 (5–4) | Algeria |
| 2008 | Kampala (Uganda) | Cameroon | 0 – 0 (4–3) | Algeria | Kenya | 1 – 1 (4–2) | Uganda |
| 2012 | Abidjan (Ivory Coast) | Mali | 1 – 0 | Cameroon | Ivory Coast | 1 – 1 (6–5) | Kenya |
| 2014 | N'Djamena (Chad) | Canceled | | | Canceled |

== Successful national teams ==
| Team | Titles | Runners-up | Third-place | Fourth-place |
|---|---|---|---|---|
| Cameroon | 2 (2006, 2008) | 1 (2012) | - | - |
| Burkina Faso | 2 (1994, 1997) | - | 2 (1998, 2001) | - |
| Egypt | 2 (1998, 2004) | - | - | - |
| Mali | 1 (2012) | 3 (1994, 2004, 2006) | - | 1 (1997) |
| Guinea | 1 (2001) | 1 (1998) | 1 (2006) | 1 (2004) |
| Ivory Coast | - | 2 (2001, 2012) | 1 (1994) | - |
| Algeria | - | 1 (2008) | 1 (2004) | 1 (2006) |
| Rwanda | - | 1 (1997) | - | 1 (2001) |
| Kenya | - | - | 1 (2008) | 1 (2012) |
| Uganda | - | - | 1 (1997) | 1 (2008) |
| Morocco | - | - | - | 1 (1998) |
| Senegal | - | - | - | 1 (1994) |

== See also ==
- Americas Military Cup
- World Military Cup
- African Military Games, also organised by OMSA
