= Shiori Shimizu =

Japanese footballer (born 1996)

Personal information
- Date of birth: 17 October 1996 (age 30)
- Place of birth: Tokyo Prefecture, Japan
- Height: 1.70 m (5 ft 7 in)
- Position: Goalkeeper

Team information
- Current team: Mynavi Sendai
- Number: 15

Senior career*
Years	Team	Apps	(Gls)
2021–2024	JEF United Chiba	49	(0)
2024–	Mynavi Sendai		
- * Club domestic league appearances and goals

Shiori Shimizu (born 17 October 1996) is a Japanese professional footballer who plays as a goalkeeper for WE League club Mynavi Sendai.

== Club career ==
Shimizu made her WE League debut on 20 September 2021.
