= Americas Military Cup =

- Founded: 1972
- Region: Americas
- Teams: 5
- Current champions: Brazil
- Most championships: Barbados; Brazil (2 titles)

The Americas Military Cup, is a football competition for national military teams in Americas, and was first held in 2001. It is organized by Organisation of Military Sport in Americas, a branch of the International Military Sports Council.
The tournament acts as qualification for the World Military Cup or the World Military Games.

== Results ==
Year	Host	Final			Third Place Match
Year	Host	Champion	Score	Second Place	Third Place	Score	Fourth Place
2001	Fort Eustis (United States)	United States	^{n/a}	Barbados	Canada
2003	St. Michael (Barbados)	Barbados	^{n/a}	United States	Canada
2005	Victoria (Canada)	Barbados	^{n/a}	Brazil	Trinidad and Tobago	^{n/a}	United States
2007	Rio de Janeiro (Brazil)	Brazil	^{n/a}	Canada	United States
2009	Dyess Air Force Base (United States)	Brazil	3 - 0	Barbados	United States	2 - 1	Suriname

^n/a A round-robin tournament determined the final standings.

== Successful national teams ==
Team	Titles	Runners-up	Third-place	Fourth-place
Barbados	2 (2003, 2005)	2 (2001, 2009)	-	-
Brazil	2 (2007, 2009)	1 (2005)	-	-
United States	1 (2001)	1 (2003)	2 (2007, 2009)	1 (2005)
Canada	-	1 (2007)	2 (2001, 2003)	-
Trinidad and Tobago	-	-	1 (2005)	-
Suriname	-	-	-	1 (2009)

== See also ==
- World Military Cup
- African Military Cup
