= Jessica Ayers =

American soccer player (born 1993)

Personal information
- Full name: Jessica Kohm Ayers
- Date of birth: June 11, 1993 (age 33)
- Place of birth: Seattle, Washington
- Height: 5 ft 5 in (1.65 m)
- Position: Midfielder

College career
| Years | Team | Apps | (Gls) |
| 2011–2014 | Colorado College Tigers | 83 | (32) |

Senior career*
| Years | Team | Apps | (Gls) |
| 2015 | Seattle Reign FC | 0 | (0) |
| 2016 | IK Myran | | |
| 2019 | IK Myran | 6 | (1) |
| 2020–2021 | FC Gintra | 27 | (42) |
| 2022–2023 | IFK Kalmar | 38 | (3) |
| 2023–2024 | Vittsjö GIK | 4 | (0) |

International career
| 2014 | United States U23 | | |
- * Club domestic league appearances and goals

Jessica Kohm Ayers (born June 11, 1993) is an American soccer player who plays as a midfielder.

== Early life and amateur career ==
Ayers grew up in Seattle. She is Jewish. She regarded United States international Mia Hamm as her football idol. Ayers played college soccer at Colorado College, earning first-team all-conference honors all four years.

== Club career ==
Ayers was drafted by FC Kansas City with the 26th pick in the 2015 NWSL College Draft. She later played for Swedish side Vittsjö GIK.

== International career ==
She was called up to the United States under-23 team in 2014.

== Style of play ==
Ayers has been described as "connects the extremely hardworking and combative chain of defenders and forwards".
