= Football at the 2015 Military World Games – Women's tournament =

2015 Women's Military Football Tournament
Tournament details
- Host country: South Korea
- City: Mungyeong
- Dates: 1–10 October 2015 (9 days)
- Teams: 6 (from 6 confederations)
- Venues: 3 (in 3 host cities)

Final positions
- Champions: Brazil (4th title)
- Runners-up: France
- Third place: South Korea

The women's football tournament at the 2015 Military World Games was held in Mungyeong in South Korea from 1st to 10 October.

== Group stage ==
Key to colours in pool tables
Qualified for the semifinals

=== Group A ===
Team	Pld	W	D	L	GF	GA	GD	Pts
France	2	2	0	0	3	1	+2	6
South Korea	2	1	0	1	3	2	+1	3
United States	2	0	0	2	0	3	−3	0

Source: CISM
1 October 2015
11:00

South Korea	1 – 2	France
J.H. Choi 7'	Report	Ramos 51'; Diguelman 90+1'

Gimcheon Sports Complex, Gimcheon
Referee: Ousmane Jacob Camara (Guinea)

3 October 2015
11:00

France	1 – 0	United States
Lizzano 60'	Report

Gimcheon Sports Complex, Gimcheon
Referee: Khamis Al-Kuwari (Qatar)

5 October 2015
11:00

United States	0 – 2	South Korea
	Report	H.S. Jeon 35'; D.W. Song 55'

Gimcheon Sports Complex, Gimcheon
Referee: Aïssatou Inter Keita (Guinea)

=== Group B ===
Team	Pld	W	D	L	GF	GA	GD	Pts
Brazil	2	1	1	0	2	1	+1	4
Netherlands	2	1	0	1	1	1	0	3
Germany	2	0	1	1	1	2	−1	1

Source: CISM
1 October 2015
15:00

Germany	0 – 1	Netherlands
	Report	de Kok 72'

Gimcheon Sports Complex, Gimcheon
Referee: Sook-Hee Kim (South Korea)

3 October 2015
15:00

Netherlands	0 – 1	Brazil
	Report	Chagas Ferreira 11'

Gimcheon Sports Complex, Gimcheon
Referee: Sabine Bonnin (France)

5 October 2015
15:00

Brazil	1 – 1	Germany
Chagas Ferreira 50'	Report	Stegemann 90+1'

Gimcheon Sports Complex, Gimcheon
Referee: Ji-Hye Kim (South Korea)

== Knockout stage ==
Semi-finals
7 October – Gimcheon
France	2
Netherlands	0
7 October – Sangju
Brazil (aet)	1
South Korea	0

Final
10 October – Mungyeong
France	1
Brazil (aet)	2
Third place
9 October – Gimcheon
Netherlands	0
South Korea	3

=== Semifinals ===
7 October 2015
11:00

France	2 – 0	Netherlands
Lernon 48'; Gueheo 86'	Report

Gimcheon Sports Complex, Gimcheon
Referee: Aïssatou Inter Keita (Guinea)

7 October 2015
11:00

Brazil	1 – 0 (aet)	South Korea
da Silva Antonio 92'	Report

Sangju Civic Stadium, Sangju
Referee: Karen Kay Abt (United States)

=== Classification 5-6 ===
9 October 2015
11:00

United States	0 – 1	Germany
	Report	Skradde 90'

Gimcheon Sports Complex, Gimcheon
Referee: Ji-Hye Kim (South Korea)

=== Third place match ===
9 October 2015
15:00

Netherlands	0 – 3	South Korea
	Report	D.E. Jeon 27'; J.E. Lee 60', 90+3'

Gimcheon Sports Complex, Gimcheon
Referee: Sabine Bonnin (France)

=== Final ===
10 October 2015
11:00

France	1 – 2 (aet)	Brazil
Garrec 15'	Report	dos Santos de Paula 21'; Chagas Ferreira 120'

KAFAC Sports Complex, Mungyeong
Referee: Sook-Hee Kim (South Korea)

== Final ranking ==
Pos	Team	Pld	W	D	L	GF	GA	GD	Pts
1	Brazil	0	0	0	0	0	0	0	0
2	France	0	0	0	0	0	0	0	0
3	South Korea	0	0	0	0	0	0	0	0
4	Netherlands	0	0	0	0	0	0	0	0
5	Germany	0	0	0	0	0	0	0	0
6	United States	0	0	0	0	0	0	0	0

Source: CISM
