= Vasıf Çetinel =

Turkish footballer (1928–2020)

Personal information
- Date of birth: 1928
- Date of death: 9 November 2020 (aged 91–92)
- Place of death: Istanbul, Turkey
- Position: Midfielder

Senior career*
Years	Team	Apps	(Gls)
- Harp Okulu

International career
1952	Turkey	2	(0)
- * Club domestic league appearances and goals

Vasıf Çetinel (1928 – 9 November 2020) was a Turkish footballer. He competed in the men's tournament at the 1952 Summer Olympics.
