= Brazil at the Military World Games =

Brazil represented by Military Sports Commission of Brazil (Portuguese: Comissão Desportiva Militar do Brasil - CDMB) part of the Military Sports Department (Portuguese: Departamento de Desporto Militar - DDM) of Ministry of Defence (Portuguese: Ministério da Defesa) is member of Conseil International du Sport Militaire (CISM). In 2011, the CMDB organized the 5th CISM Military World Games in Rio de Janeiro.

Brazil has participated in all the Summer Military World Games since the beginning in 1995. Brazil is 4th on the all time medal table.

== Medal table ==
=== By championships ===
*Red border color indicates tournament was held on home soil.

Year	Gold	Silver	Bronze	Total
(Brazil) 2011 Rio de Janeiro	45	33	36	114
(South Korea) 2015 Mungyeong	34	26	24	84
(Italy) 2003 Catania	1	5	0	6
(Croatia) 1999 Zagreb	1	4	3	8
(India) 2007 Hyderabad	0	2	1	3
(Italy) 1995 Rome	0	1	2	3
Totals (6 entries)	81	71	66	218

== See also ==
- Brazil at the Olympics
- Brazil at the Universiade
- Brazil at the Pan American Games
