= Amancay Urbani =

Argentine footballer

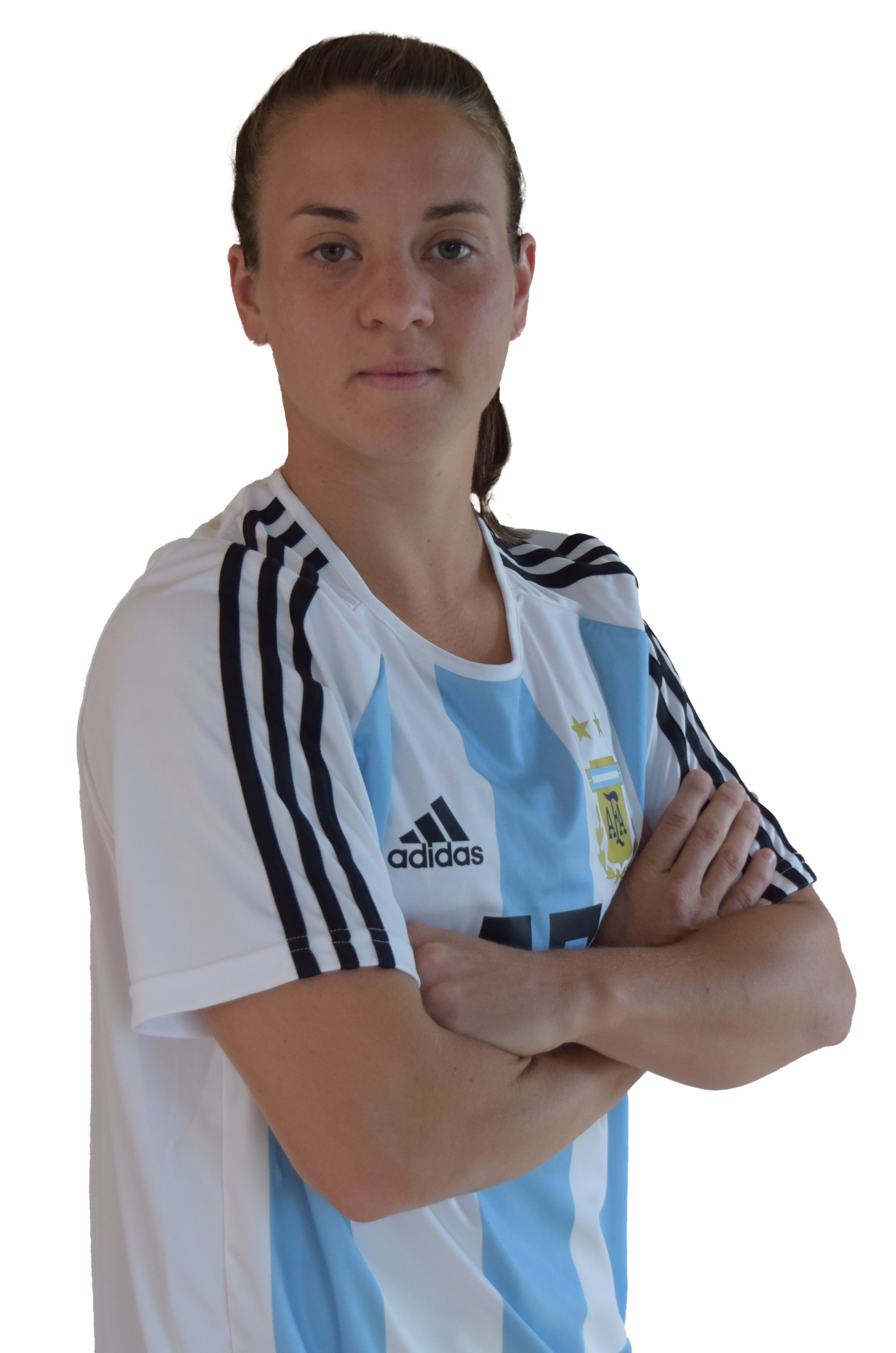

Personal information
- Date of birth: 7 December 1991 (age 34)
- Place of birth: Moussy, Santa Fe, Argentina
- Height: 1.57 m (5 ft 2 in)
- Position: Forward

Team information
- Current team: Boca Juniors
- Number: 7

Youth career
- 2003: Club Futuro

Senior career*
Years	Team	Apps	(Gls)
2015–2018	Belgrano		
2018–2021	Alavés Gloriosas		
2021	Osasuna		
2022–	Boca Juniors		

International career
2006	Argentina U-20	2	(0)
2010–	Argentina	7	(0)
- * Club domestic league appearances and goals

Amancay Urbani (born 7 December 1991) is an Argentine footballer who plays as a forward for Boca Juniors and the Argentina women's national team.

== International career ==
Urbani represented Argentina at the 2006 FIFA U-20 Women's World Championship. She made her senior debut at the 2010 South American Women's Football Championship and also appeared at the 2011 Pan American Games and the 2018 Copa América Femenina.

== Honours ==
Boca Juniors

- Primera División A: 2022, 2023
