= Football at the 2019 Military World Games – Women's tournament =

Women's Football Tournament at the 2019 Military World Games
Tournament details
- Host country: China
- Dates: 17 – 26 October
- Teams: 8 (from 5 confederations)
- Venues: 2 (in 1 host city)

Final positions
- Champions: North Korea
- Runners-up: China
- Third place: Brazil
- Fourth place: South Korea

The Women's football tournament at the 2019 Military World Games was held in Wuhan in China from 17 to 26 October.

== Group stage ==
=== Group A ===
Pos	Team	Pld	W	D	L	GF	GA	GD	Pts	Qualification
1	China (H)	3	3	0	0	11	0	+11	9	Semi-finals
2	South Korea	3	2	0	1	8	4	+4	6	Semi-finals
3	Germany	3	1	0	2	2	10	−8	3	
4	United States	3	0	0	3	0	7	−7	0	

Source: Wuhan 2019
(H) Hosts
17 October 2019
15:00 UTC+8

China	3–0	South Korea

Wuhan National Fitness Center Football Field 1, Wuhan
17 October 2019
15:00 UTC+8

Germany	1–0	United States

Wuhan National Fitness Center Football Field 2, Wuhan
19 October 2019
15:00 UTC+8

China	4–0	Germany

Wuhan National Fitness Center Football Field 1, Wuhan
19 October 2019
15:00 UTC+8

United States	0–2	South Korea

Wuhan National Fitness Center Football Field 2, Wuhan
21 October 2019
15:00 UTC+8

United States	0–4	China

Wuhan National Fitness Center Football Field 1, Wuhan
21 October 2019
15:00 UTC+8

South Korea	6–1	Germany

Wuhan National Fitness Center Football Field 2, Wuhan

=== Group B ===
Pos	Team	Pld	W	D	L	GF	GA	GD	Pts	Qualification
1	North Korea	3	3	0	0	9	0	+9	9	Semi-finals
2	Brazil	3	1	1	1	4	3	+1	4	Semi-finals
3	Cameroon	3	1	1	1	2	2	0	4	
4	France	3	0	0	3	0	10	−10	0	

Source: Wuhan 2019
17 October 2019
15:00 UTC+8

Brazil	0–3	North Korea

Wuhan National Fitness Center Football Field 3, Wuhan
17 October 2019
15:00 UTC+8

Cameroon	2–0	France

Wuhan National Fitness Center Football Field 4, Wuhan
19 October 2019
15:00 UTC+8

Brazil	0–0	Cameroon

Wuhan National Fitness Center Football Field 3, Wuhan
19 October 2019
15:00 UTC+8

France	0–4	North Korea

Wuhan National Fitness Center Football Field 4, Wuhan
21 October 2019
15:00 UTC+8

France	0–4	Brazil

Wuhan National Fitness Center Football Field 3, Wuhan
21 October 2019
15:00 UTC+8

North Korea	2–0	Cameroon

Wuhan National Fitness Center Football Field 4, Wuhan

== Knockout stage ==
=== Semi-finals ===
24 October 2019
11:00 UTC+8

China	2–1 (a.e.t.)	Brazil

Hankou Cultural Sports Centre, Wuhan
24 October 2019
15:00 UTC+8

North Korea	2–0	South Korea

Hankou Cultural Sports Centre, Wuhan

=== Bronze medal match ===
26 October 2019
11:00 UTC+8

Brazil	3–1	South Korea

Hankou Cultural Sports Centre, Wuhan

=== Gold medal match ===
26 October 2019
15:00 UTC+8

China	1–2	North Korea

Hankou Cultural Sports Centre, Wuhan
