= 2015 Military World Games =

Multi-sport event in Mungyeong, South Korea

VI Military World Games
- Host city: Mungyeong, North Gyeongsang, South Korea
- Motto: Friendship Together, Peace Forever (우정의 어울림, 평화의 두드림)
- Nations: 110
- Athletes: 8,700
- Events: 246 in 23 sports
- Opening: 2 October 2015
- Closing: 11 October 2015
- Opened by: President Park Geun-hye
- Main venue: KAFAC Sports Complex

Summer

Winter

The 2015 Military World Games (Korean: 2015년 세계 군인 체육 대회; lit. '2015 World Military Sports Festival'), officially known as the 6th CISM Military World Games (제6회 세계 군인 체육 대회; lit. '6th World Military Sports Festival') and also known as Mungyeong 2015 (문경 2015), were hosted from October 2–11, 2015 in Mungyeong, South Korea.

The games were the largest military sports event ever held in South Korea, with approximately 8,700 athletes from 110 countries competing in 24 sports. The Games were organized by the Ministry of National Defense Republic of Korea in accordance with CISM regulations and the rules of the International Sports Federations.

== Venues ==
=== North Gyeongsang ===
==== Mungyeong ====
Venue	Sport
Mungyeong Indoor Stadium	Wrestling
KAFAC Sports Complex	Football, Athletics
KAFAC Indoor Sports Complex	Judo, Taekwondo
KAFAC Modern Pentathlon Stadium	Modern Pentathlon
KAFAC Shooting Range	Aeronautical Pentathlon
KAFAC Indoor Tennis Courts	Fencing
Mungyeong Civic Stadium	Football
Mungyeong Cycling Course	Cycling

==== Pohang ====
Venue	Sport
1st Marine Division, Pohang	Parachuting, Naval Pentathlon
Yeongildae Beach	Sailing, Triathlon

==== Gimcheon ====
Venue	Sport
Gimcheon Sports Complex	Football
Gimcheon Indoor Swimming Pool	Swimming
Gimcheon Sports Town Indoor Gymnasium	Volleyball
Gimcheon Sports Town Badminton Stadium	Volleyball

==== Andong ====
Venue	Sport
Top-Bliss CC	Golf
Andong Indoor Gymnasium	Basketball
Andong Civic Stadium	Football

==== Yeongcheon ====
Venue	Sport
Yeongcheon KAAY	Shooting, Military Pentathlon
Yeongcheon Indoor Swimming Pool	Military Pentathlon

==== Yeongju ====
Venue	Sport
Yeongju Indoor Gymnasium	Boxing
Yeongju Dongyang University	Orienteering
Yeongju Civic Stadium	Football

==== Sangju ====
Venue	Sport
Sangju Civic Stadium	Football
Sangju Indoor Gymnasium	Handball

==== Yecheon ====
Venue	Sport
Yecheon JinHo International Archery Field	Archery
Yecheon 16th Fighter Wing	Aeronautical Pentathlon

=== Daegu ===
Venue	Sport
Daegu Shooting Range	Shooting

== Participating nations ==
- Algeria (56)
- Albania (5)
- Angola (2)
- Armenia (15)
- Argentina (2)
- Azerbaijan (20)
- Austria (37)
- Brazil (329)
- Bahrain (69)
- Barbados (2)
- Belarus (95)
- Benin
- Bosnia and Herzegovina (11)
- Belgium (51)
- Bulgaria (21)
- Burkina Faso (3)
- Canada (104)
- Cameroon (55)
- Central African Republic
- Republic of the Congo (19)
- Chile (32)
- Colombia (31)
- China (553)
- Croatia (11)
- Cyprus (8)
- Czech Republic (27)
- Chad (11)
- Denmark (61)
- Dominican Republic (31)
- Ecuador (74)
- Egypt (83)
- Estonia (27)
- Swaziland (2)
- Finland (53)
- France (273)
- Germany (243)
- Gabon (9)
- Greece (46)
- Guinea (14)
- Hungary (56)
- India (54)
- Iran (90)
- Iraq
- Indonesia (46)
- Italy (139)
- Ivory Coast
- Jamaica
- Jordan (5)
- Kazakhstan (62)
- Kenya (14)
- Kuwait (35)
- Lesotho (3)
- Latvia (32)
- Lebanon (7)
- Lithuania (56)
- Luxembourg (18)
- Macedonia
- Malawi
- Mali
- Mauritania
- Morocco (24)
- Monaco (2)
- Mongolia (75)
- Montenegro (2)
- Macedonia (4)
- Namibia (3)
- Netherlands (89)
- Niger (3)
- Nigeria (12)
- Norway (28)
- Oman (63)
- Pakistan (19)
- Palestine (9)
- Peru (15)
- Poland (193)
- Qatar (99)
- Romania (77)
- Russia (243)
- Saudi Arabia (41)
- Senegal (3)
- Serbia (41)
- Slovakia (14)
- Slovenia (32)
- South Korea (172)
- Spain (111)
- Sri Lanka (73)
- Suriname
- Sweden (72)
- Switzerland (67)
- Syria (15)
- Tanzania (22)
- Thailand (55)
- Trinidad and Tobago
- Tunisia (17)
- Turkey (20)
- United Arab Emirates (27)
- United States (172)
- Uganda (5)
- Uzbekistan (50)
- Ukraine (87)
- Uruguay (27)
- Venezuela (84)
- Vietnam (32)
- Zambia (13)
- Zimbabwe (28)

== Sports ==
The competition comprised 24 sports, some of them appearing for the first time in military world games, such as archery.

- Aeronautical pentathlon (details)
- Archery
- Athletics (and Para Athletics)
- Basketball
- Boxing
- Cycling
- Fencing
- Football
- Golf
- Handball
- Judo
- Military pentathlon
- Modern pentathlon
- Naval pentathlon
- Orienteering
- Parachuting
- Sailing
- Shooting
- Swimming
- Taekwondo
- Triathlon
- Volleyball
- Wrestling

== Games schedule ==
OC	Opening ceremony	●	Event competitions	1	Daily medal events	CC	Closing ceremony

September/October	30th Wed	1st Thu	2nd Fri	3rd Sat	4th Sun	5th Mon	6th Tue	7th Wed	8th Thu	9th Fri	10th Sat	11th Sun	Events
Ceremonies			OC									CC	
Aeronautical pentathlon					1		●	●	●	4			5
Archery						●	●	1	2	2			5
Athletics					4	5	11	6	12			4	42
Basketball				●	●	●	●		●	●	1		1
Boxing					●	●	●	●	●		10		10
Cycling							2	2	2				6
Fencing					2	2	2	2	2	2			12
Football	●	●	●	●	●	●	●	●	●	●	2		2
Golf							●	●	●	4			4
Handball					●	●	●		●	●	1		1
Judo				2		7	7						16
Military pentathlon				●	●	●	●	4		2			6
Modern pentathlon								●	2	2	1		5
Naval pentathlon							●	●	●	4			4
Orienteering								2	4		2		8
Parachuting				●	●	●	1	6	9				16
Sailing					●	●	●	2					2
Shooting						4	6	2	4	6	2		24
Swimming								10	8	9	11		38
Taekwondo									6	5	5		16
Triathlon											5		5
Volleyball				●	●	●	●	●		●	2		2
Wrestling							4	4		4	4		16
Daily medal events				2	7	18	33	41	51	44	46	4	246
Cumulative total				2	9	27	60	101	152	196	242	246	246
September/October	30th Wed	1st Thu	2nd Fri	3rd Sat	4th Sun	5th Mon	6th Tue	7th Wed	8th Thu	8th Fri	10th Sat	11th Sun	Events

== Medal table ==
Host nation (South Korea)

Rank	Nation	Gold	Silver	Bronze	Total
1	Russia (RUS)	59	43	33	135
2	Brazil (BRA)	34	26	24	84
3	China (CHN)	32	31	35	98
4	South Korea (KOR)*	19	15	25	59
5	Poland (POL)	10	13	19	42
6	France (FRA)	9	9	11	29
7	Germany (GER)	8	10	15	33
8	Bahrain (BHR)	7	2	4	13
9	Italy (ITA)	5	11	12	28
10	Ukraine (UKR)	5	9	12	26
11	Egypt (EGY)	4	4	6	14
12	Kazakhstan (KAZ)	4	3	6	13
13	Algeria (ALG)	4	3	2	9
14	Norway (NOR)	4	1	1	6
15	Iran (IRI)	3	10	15	28
16	Mongolia (MGL)	3	4	6	13
17	Czech Republic (CZE)	3	2	1	6
18	Tunisia (TUN)	3	0	1	4
19	Azerbaijan (AZE)	2	4	6	12
20	Kenya (KEN)	2	4	4	10
21	Finland (FIN)	2	4	1	7
22	Austria (AUT)	2	3	2	7
23	Switzerland (SUI)	2	2	2	6
23	United States (USA)	2	2	2	6
25	Belgium (BEL)	2	1	2	5
26	Sweden (SWE)	2	0	2	4
27	Saudi Arabia (KSA)	2	0	0	2
28	Belarus (BLR)	1	6	6	13
29	Qatar (QAT)	1	5	2	8
30	Slovenia (SLO)	1	1	3	5
31	Vietnam (VIE)	1	1	2	4
32	Oman (OMA)	1	1	1	3
33	Ecuador (ECU)	1	1	0	2
34	Morocco (MAR)	1	0	5	6
35	Estonia (EST)	1	0	2	3
35	Turkey (TUR)	1	0	2	3
37	Croatia (CRO)	1	0	0	1
37	Hungary (HUN)	1	0	0	1
37	Syria (SYR)	1	0	0	1
40	Romania (ROU)	0	3	3	6
41	India (IND)	0	2	5	7
42	Latvia (LAT)	0	2	2	4
43	Lithuania (LTU)	0	1	3	4
44	Dominican Republic (DOM)	0	1	2	3
44	Indonesia (INA)	0	1	2	3
44	Thailand (THA)	0	1	2	3
44	Venezuela (VEN)	0	1	2	3
48	Armenia (ARM)	0	1	1	2
49	Greece (GRE)	0	1	0	1
49	Luxembourg (LUX)	0	1	0	1
51	Bulgaria (BUL)	0	0	2	2
51	Cameroon (CMR)	0	0	2	2
51	Canada (CAN)	0	0	2	2
51	Denmark (DEN)	0	0	2	2
55	Kuwait (KUW)	0	0	1	1
55	South Africa (RSA)	0	0	1	1
55	Sri Lanka (SRI)	0	0	1	1
55	Uganda (UGA)	0	0	1	1
Totals (58 entries)		246	246	306	798
