= DoCo (pop group) =

Japanese pop group

- Genre: Pop
- Past members: Megumi Hayashibara (voice of female Ranma), Noriko Hidaka (Akane Tendo), Minami Takayama (Nabiki Tendo), Kikuko Inoue (Kasumi Tendo), Rei Sakuma (Shampoo)

DoCo is a pop group composed of five female Ranma ½ voice actresses. The performances are done in-character. DoCo has released three albums: DoCo★First, DoCo☆Second, and DoCo Original Karaoke. Some of the songs were translated and performed in English by DoCo U.S.A., the corresponding English language voice actors. Some of their songs were used as the opening and ending themes for the Ranma ½ OVA, as well as in music videos that accompanied the OVAs. A few songs (such as the DoCo version of CoCo's "Equal Romance") also appear on various Ranma ½ musical albums.

DoCo is in some sense a parody of CoCo. As "CoCo" can be taken to mean ここ (koko, here), "DoCo" can be taken to mean どこ (doko, where?).

== Members ==
- Megumi Hayashibara, as female Ranma
- Noriko Hidaka, as Akane Tendo
- Minami Takayama, as Nabiki Tendo
- Kikuko Inoue, as Kasumi Tendo
- Rei Sakuma, as Shampoo

DoCo U.S.A.

- Rose Hastreiter, as female Ranma
- Tanya Hancheroff, as Akane Tendo
- Saffron Henderson, as Nabiki Tendo
- Willow Johnson, as Kasumi Tendo
- Cathy Weseluck, as Shampoo

Before becoming a voice actress, Hidaka got her start in the 1980s as a tarento and pop singer. Takayama is one half of the electronic pop duo Two-Mix.

== OVA appearance ==
DoCo makes one actual performance in the Ranma ½ anime, in the OVA "Tendo Family Christmas Scramble" as the opening act for the Christmas party that is hosted by the Tendos. They perform a karaoke version of "Equal Romance" as the opening act for a talent show.

== Discography ==
DoCo★First (Jul 21, 1991):

- "Us From Now On" (僕たちはこれから Bokutachi wa Kore Kara)
- "Red Shoe Sunday" (赤い靴のSUNDAY Akai Kutsu no Sunday)
- "Liar" (うそつき Usotsuki)
- "A Slightly Hilly Road" (少しだけ坂道 Sukoshi Dake Sakamichi)
- "So Many Memories" (思い出がいっぱい Omoide ga Ippai)
- "Boyfriend" (彼 Kare)

DoCo☆Second (Dec 16, 1994):

- "A Pure and Honest Christmas" (清く正しいクリスマス Kiyoku Tadashii Kurisumasu)
- "In the Middle of Elementary School" (授業中の小学校 Jugyōchū no Shōgakkō)
- "Neverending Summer Vacation" (終わらない夏休み Owaranai Natsu Yasumi)
- "The Sparkling Sky & Your Voice" (かがやく空ときみの声 Kagayaku Sora to Kimi no Koe)
- "Love Vanished Once, Regrettably" (恋がひとつ消えてしまったの Koi ga Hitotsu Kiete Shimatta no)
- "Mutual Love is Complex (Live)" (フクザツな両想いLive Version Fukuzatsu na Ryōomoi Live Version)
