= Kenichi Ogata (voice actor) =

Japanese actor (born 1942)

- 緒方 賢一
- Born: March 29, 1942 (age 84); Tagawa District, Fukuoka Prefecture, Japan
- Occupations: Actor; voice actor
- Years active: 1970–present
- Agent: Umikaze
- Website: Official profile

Kenichi Ogata (緒方 賢一, Ogata Ken'ichi; born March 29, 1942) is a Japanese actor and voice actor from Fukuoka Prefecture.

Some of his most notable projects have been Ranma ½ as Genma Saotome, Mahōjin Guru Guru as Kita Kita Oyaji, Detective Conan as Professor Hiroshi Agasa, Atashin'chi as Father, Inuyasha as Myōga, Kirby of the Stars as King Dedede, and the Ganbare Goemon series as Ebisumaru, Boxy & Boat Captain in the You're Under Arrest manga, television and film, respectively. The work in which he voiced the most characters was in the Super Robot Wars series. He used to work at Aoni Production and now is working at Umikaze.

== Biography ==
Kenichi Ogata was born on March 29, 1942. After graduating junior high school, Ogata studied cooking, and then went to high school, where he aimed to be a comedy performer, and worked for some theatrical companies. His voice acting debut was in Mazinger Z, and he has been voice acting ever since.

He is known for his unique soft voice, but also for his astringent and villain roles, having an established reputation for his role in Tensai Bakabon.

== Filmography ==
=== Television animation ===
- Getter Robo (1974) (General Bat)
- Great Mazinger (1974) (Great General of Darkness, Nuke)
- Space Battleship Yamato (1974) (Analyzer)
- Getter Robo G (1975) (Hidra)
- Grendizer (1975) (Colonel Blaki)
- Steel Jeeg (1975) (Ikima, Kurowashi no Don)
- Gansou Tensai Bakabon (1975) (Nyarome, Thief, Weather Forecaster, Dog of Flanders, additional voices)
- Combattler V (1976) (Girua, Dangeru)
- Gaiking (1976) (Hayami Bunta)
- Wakusei Robo Danguard Ace (1977) (Gudon, Rugā)
- Captain Future (1978) (Grag)
- Captain Harlock (1978) (Chief Engineer Maji)
- Mobile Suit Gundam (1979) (Denim)
- Kaibutsu-kun (1980) (Nonbirasu)
- Maeterlinck's Blue Bird: Tyltyl and Mytyl's Adventurous Journey (1980) (Spirit of Fire)
- Space Emperor God Sigma (1980) (Martino)
- The Wonderful Adventures of Nils (1980) (Lasse)
- Ninja Hattori-kun (1981) (Shishimaru)
- Fang of the Sun Dougram (1981) (Nanashi)
- Urusei Yatsura (1981) (Ataru's father)
- Combat Mecha Xabungle (1982) (Kashim King)
- Game Center Arashi (1982) (Ippeita)
- Armored Trooper Votoms (1983) (Boror)
- Igano Kabamaru (1983) (Saizō Igano)
- Chikkun Takkun (1984) (Gijigiji)
- Sei Jūshi Bismark (1984) (Gustav)
- Ai Shoujo Pollyanna Monogatari (1986) (Tom)
- Anmitsu Hime (1986) (Wantan)
- Uchūsen Sagittarius (1986) (Rana)
- Bubblegum Crisis (1987) (Doctor Raven)
- Kimagure Orange Road (1987) (Jingoro, Kyosuke's grandfather)
- Anpanman (1988) (Hedoroman)
- Osomatsu-kun (1988) (Shinigami, understudy for Dayōn in episodes 80-83 and Kemunpasu)
- The Burning Wild Man (1988) (Kenkichi Kokuhō)
- Mashin Hero Wataru (1988) (Genryūsai Shinobibe, Doctor Cosmo)
- Alfred J. Kwak (1989) (Henk)
- Lupin III: Bye-Bye Liberty Crisis (1989) (Ed)
- Guyver (1989) (Genzō Makishima/Enzyme)
- The Adventures of Peter Pan (1989) (Smee)
- Ranma ½ (1989) (Genma Saotome)
- Kyatto Ninden Teyandee (1990) (Nekomata Reikainosuke)
- Magical Angel Sweet Mint (1990) (Vinegar)
- Watashi no Ashinaga Ojisan (1990) (George)
- Robin Hood no Daibōken (1990) (Friar Tuck)
- The Three-Eyed One (1990) (Ban Shunsaku)
- Tasuke, the Samurai Cop (1990) (School Director)
- The Bush Baby (1992) (Kurankushou)
- YuYu Hakusho (1992) (Tarukane)
- Nintama Rantarou (1993) (Shinbei's papa)
- Mahōjin Guru Guru (1994) (Udberg "Kita Kita Oyaji" Eldol)
- Nanatsu no Umi no Tico (1994) (Alphonse Aldretti)
- Tenchi Universe (1995) (Azaka, both Guardian and Knight)
- Detective Conan (1996) (Professor Hiroshi Agasa)
- Rurouni Kenshin (1996) (Heizo Ogawa)
- Midori no Makibaō (1996) (Genjirou)
- Those Who Hunt Elves (1996) (Pierre)
- Anime Ganbare Goemon (1997) (Ebisumaru)
- Flame of Recca (1997) (Kokū)
- Lupin III: In Memory of the Walther P-38 (1997) (Bomū)
- The King of Braves GaoGaiGar (1997) (Leo Shishio, Liger Shishio, Pasdar)
- Pokémon (1997) (John, Rohho, village headman)
- You're Under Arrest (1997) (Boxy)
- Cyber Team in Akihabara (1998) (Shimabukurō Sengakuji)
- Dokkiri Doctor (1998) (Rokoro Shibuya)
- Sexy Commando Gaiden: Sugoiyo! Masaru-san (1998) (Bosu)
- Excel Saga (1999) (Aesop)
- One Piece (1999) (Ethanbaron V. Nusjuro, Gancho)
- Inuyasha (2000) (Myōga)
- UFO Baby (2000) (Housho Sayonji)
- Vandread: The Second Stage (2000) (Taraak Elder)
- Lupin III: Alcatraz Connection (2001) (Areji)
- Kirby of the Stars (2001) (King Dedede)
- Shaman King (2001) (Shamon)
- Atashin'chi (2002) (Father)
- Bomberman Jetters (2002) (Doctor Ein)
- MegaMan NT Warrior (2002) (TopMan)
- Pokémon Advanced Generation (2002) (Tessen)
- Dokkoida?! (2003) (Kurisaburou Kurinohara, Doctor Marron Flower)
- Sgt. Frog (2004) (Keroro's father)
- Blood+ (2005) (Ted A. Adams)
- Doraemon (2005) (Sensei Funyako)
- MÄR (2005) (Vidar)
- Aria the Natural (2006) (Maestro)
- Binchō-tan (2006) (Madake-jiichan)
- Gintama (2006) (Santa)
- The Melancholy of Haruhi Suzumiya (2006) (Shamisen)
- Nana (2006) (Andou)
- The Third (2006) (Noru)
- Juushin Enbu Hero Tales (2007) (Sonnei)
- To Love-Ru (2008) (Principal)
- Fresh Pretty Cure! (2009) (Chorō Tiramisu)
- Chi's New Address (2009) (Fuji)
- Yugioh Zexal! (2011) (Jinlong)
- In Search of the Lost Future (2014) (Mitsunori Ogawa)
- Nobunaga Concerto (2014) (Takugen)
- Nisekoi (2014) (Issei Ichijo)
- Comical Psychosomatic Medicine (2015) (Sukizō Kangoshi)
- My Hero Academia (2017) (Gran Torino)
- Altair: A Record of Battles" (2017) (Şehir Halil)
- Radiant (2018) (Santori)
- The Rising of the Shield Hero (2019) (Beloukas "The Slave Trader")
- Dragon Quest: The Adventure of Dai (2020) (Brass)
- Yashahime: Princess Half-Demon (2020) (Myōga)
- Getter Robo Arc (2021) (Professor Han)
- Irina: The Vampire Cosmonaut (2021) (Fjodor Gergiev)
- The Devil Is a Part-Timer!! (2022) (Camio)
- Detective Conan: The Culprit Hanzawa (2022) (Professor Hiroshi Agasa)
- Giant Beasts of Ars (2023) (Zen)
- Too Cute Crisis (2023) (Mikiti Furupururin)
- Ranma ½ (2024) (Narrator)
- Miru: Paths to My Future (2025) (Mr. Onion)
- The Ghost in the Shell (2026) (Colonel Tonoda)

=== Original video animation (OVA) ===
- Dangaioh (1987) (Captain Garimoth)
- Wicked City (1987) (Male Co-Worker)
- Gosenzo-sama Banbanzai! (1989) (Kinekuni Yomota)
- Legend of the Galactic Heroes (1989) (Marinesk)
- Adventure Kid (1992) (Doctor Masago)
- Dragon Half (1993) (King Siva)
- Mega Man: Upon a Star (1993) (Dr. Wily)
- Final Fantasy: Legend of the Crystals (1994) (Ra Devil)
- Venus 5 (1994) (Buccha)
- Saber Marionette R (1997) (Ojiji)
- The King of Braves GaoGaiGar Final (2000) (Leo Shishio)
- Apocalypse Zero (2010) (High school principal, Kagenari)

Various dates

- Ranma ½ OVA (Genma Saotome)

=== Original net animation (ONA) ===
- Comical Psychosomatic Medicine (2015) (Sukizō Kangoshi)

=== Theatrical animation ===
- Lupin III: Legend of the Gold of Babylon (1985) (Sam)
- MAROKO (1990) (Kinekuni Yomota)
- Doraemon: Nobita and the Tin Labyrinth (1993) (Nejirin Captain)
- Memories (1995) (Omaeda)
- Mahojin Guru Guru (1996) (Udberg "Kita Kita Oyaji" Eldol)
- Violinist of Hameln (1996) (Bass)
- You're Under Arrest: The Movie (1999) (Boat Captain)
- Crayon Shin-chan: The Storm Called: The Battle of the Warring States (2002) (Niemon)
- Dobutsu no Mori (2006) (Kotobuki)
- Umamusume: Pretty Derby – Beginning of a New Era (2024) (Trainer Tanabe)

Various dates

- Inuyasha series (Myōga)
- Space Battleship Yamato series (Analyzer)
- Urusei Yatsura series (Ataru's father)

=== Video games ===
- Puyo Puyo~n (1999) (Skeleton T)
- Time Leap (2007) (Grandfather)

Unknown date

- Ape Escape 2 and 3 (Ukki White)
- Arc the Lad (Chongara)
- Blue Dragon (Fūshira)
- Brave Fencer Musashi (Tekīra)
- Crash Bandicoot (Aku Aku) (Japanese dub)
- Crash Bandicoot: Warped (Aku Aku) (Japanese dub)
- Crash Bandicoot: The Wrath of Cortex (Aku Aku) (Japanese dub)
- Crash Bandicoot 2: Cortex Strikes Back (Aku Aku) (Japanese dub)
- Crash Bandicoot 4: It's About Time (Aku Aku) (Japanese dub)
- Crash Bash (Aku Aku) (Japanese dub)
- Crash Nitro Kart (Aku Aku) (Japanese dub)
- Crash Team Racing (Aku Aku) (Japanese dub)
- Crash Twinsanity (Aku Aku) (Japanese dub)
- Devil Kings (Shimazu Yoshihiro)
- Everybody's Golf (Stud)
- Ganbare Goemon series (Ebisumaru)
- God of War III (Poseidon)
- Harry Potter and the Philosopher's Stone (Filius Flitwick) (Japanese dub)
- Inuyasha (Myōga)
- Inuyasha: The Secret of the Cursed Mask (Myōga)
- Mana-Khemia 2: Ochita Gakuen to Renkinjutsushi-tachi (Gotou)
- Mega Man Legends (Barrell Caskett)
- Mega Man Legends 2 (Barrell Caskett)
- Mobile Suit Gundam Battlefield Record U.C. 0081 (Bob Rock)
- Mobile Suit Gundam Side Story 0079: Rise from the Ashes (Bob Rock)
- Power Stone (Aporusu)
- Radiata Stories (Jasune Colton)
- Ranma ½ (Genma Saotome)
- Sengoku Basara: Battle Heroes (Shimazu Yoshihiro)
- Sengoku Basara: Samurai Heroes (Shimazu Yoshihiro)
- Sengoku Basara 2 (Shimazu Yoshihiro)
- Sengoku Basara 4 (Shimazu Yoshihiro)
- Skylanders: Giants (Pop Fizz)
- Space Battleship Yamato series (Analyzer)
- Steambot Chronicles (Nutmeg)
- Wild Arms Alter Code: F (Aruhazādo)
- The Wonderful 101 (James Shirogane)

=== Live-action roles ===
- X-Bomber (1981) (Dr. Gedora)
- Space Battleship Yamato (2010) (voice of Analyzer)
- Daddy Sister (2016)
- Segodon (2018) (Nakayama Tadayasu)
- Awaiting Kirin (2020) (Monk)
- The 13 Lords of the Shogun (2022) (Chief priest of Ganjōju-in)
- The Tiger and Her Wings (2024) (Shigeta)

=== Dubbing roles ===
==== Live Action ====
- Ace Ventura: When Nature Calls (Fulton Greenwall (Ian McNeice))
- Breakfast at Tiffany's (Nippon Television Edition) (Mr. Yunioshi)
- Butch Cassidy and the Sundance Kid (2013 Star Channel/On-Demand Dub) (Percy Garris)
- Casper (1998 NTV Dub) (Stretch)
- Clifford the Big Red Dog (Mr. Bridwell (John Cleese))
- Ewoks: The Battle for Endor (Noa (Wilford Brimley))
- Die Hard 2 (1992 Fuji TV Dub) (Leslie Barnes (Art Evans))
- The Exterminator (1981 Fuji TV Dub) (The State Senator from New Jersey)
- Full House (Lou, shop manager)
- Gremlins 2: The New Batch (DVD and 1994 TV Asahi Dubs) (Brain Gremlin)
- History of the World, Part I (1992 TV Asahi Dub) (Caesar, Swiftus)
- Indiana Jones and the Last Crusade (1993 Fuji TV Dub) (Sallah (John Rhys-Davies))
- Johnny Dangerously (1991 NTV Dub) (Burr)
- Jumanji (1998 Fuji TV Edition) (Hunter Van Pelt)
- The Lord of the Rings: The Fellowship of the Ring (Barliman Butterbur)
- Pippi Longstocking (Thunder-Karlsson)
- Police Academy 2: Their First Assignment (Zed) (1988 Fuji TV Dub)
- Police Academy 3: Back in Training (Zed) (1988 TBS Dub)
- Police Academy 4: Citizens on Patrol (Zed) (1989 TBS Dub)
- Quincy, M.E. (Lieutenant Frank Monahan)
- Rocky IV (Duke)
- She-Wolf of London (PC Leary (Richard Coleman))
- The Sting (1991 TV Asahi and 2005 DVD Dubs) (FBI Agent Polk (Dana Elcar))
- Teenage Mutant Ninja Turtles II: The Secret of the Ooze (Professor Jordan Perry)
- Throw Momma from the Train (Owen Lift (Danny DeVito))
- V (1988 Nippon TV Dub) (Willie (Robert Englund))
- Wayne's World (Noah Vanderhoff (Brian Doyle-Murray))

==== Animation ====
- Animaniacs (The Brain)
- Pinky and the Brain (The Brain)
- Arthur Christmas (Grandsanta)
- The Brave Little Toaster (Black and White TV)
- Dinosaurs (Gus)
- DuckTales (Bigtime Beagle)
- The Secret of NIMH (Sullivan)
- Star Wars: Ewoks (Chirpa)
- Who Framed Roger Rabbit (Marvin Acme, Porky Pig and Woody Woodpecker)

=== Japanese Voice-Over ===
- Splash Mountain (Br'er Vulture 1)

== Awards ==
Year	Award	Category	Result	Ref.
2019	13th Seiyu Awards	Achievement Award	Won	
