= Street Combat =

1993 video game

- North American cover art
- Developer: NCS Corporation
- Publishers: JP: Masaya Games; NA/EU: Irem
- Director: Katsutoshi Yamamoto
- Producer: Toshirou Tsuchida
- Designer: Keisuke Tadakuma
- Programmer: Katsutoshi Yamamoto
- Artists: Hitoshi Ariga; Keisuke Tadakuma
- Composers: Jun Enoki; Masanao Akahori
- Series: Ranma ½
- Platform: Super NES
- Release: JP: March 27, 1992; NA: April 1993; EU: July 1993
- Genre: Fighting
- Modes: Single-player, multiplayer

Street Combat is a fighting video game developed by NCS Corporation for the Super Nintendo Entertainment System (SNES). The game centers around Steven, a scientist and Kung Fu expert who enters a martial arts tournament to thwart the plans of a terrorist organization. Gameplay consists of one-on-one battles where the player must defeat opponents in sets of rounds using both standard and special attacks. It also features bonus rounds and a two-player versus option.

The game was originally released in Japan in 1992 by the NCS label Masaya Games under the title Ranma ½: Chōnai Gekitōhen (Note: Japanese: らんま1/2 町内激闘篇, Hepburn: Ranma Nibun-no-Ichi: Chōnai Gekitōhen; "Ranma ½: Neighborhood Battle Chapter") as an adaptation of the manga series Ranma ½ authored by Rumiko Takahashi. When Irem localized it as Street Combat for the western market in 1993, the game mechanics were unaltered. However, all connections to the manga were removed, most notably with its entire roster of characters being replaced with different sprites.

Both versions of the game were critically compared and contrasted with the popular arcade hit Street Fighter II from Capcom. Street Combat has been largely panned for its substituted graphics and simplistic gameplay mechanics. The development team's next game in the series, Ranma ½: Hard Battle, was localized outside of Japan with the manga license retained.

== Gameplay ==
Street Combat is a fighting game centered around a world martial arts tournament of the same name. The game's primary mode has the player take control of Steven, a genius scientist and Kung Fu expert. Steven infiltrates the competition to halt the assassination of a global leader to be carried out by C.J., the head of the V.I.P. terrorist organization. The game's story campaign consists of six consecutive one-on-one battles against Tyrone, G.I. Jim, Helmut, Lita, and finally C.J. himself. Every match starts with the player choosing between two versions of Steven, though they differ very little in ability. In each fight the player must win two out of the three rounds to advance to the next match. Both fighters have a health gauge that depletes when successful blows are landed. The player's actions are mapped to individual face or shoulder buttons, including jumping, blocking, basic punches and kicks, and some special attacks. Other specials are executed using simple combinations of buttons.

A high score counter increases with hits and round completions. Between matches, the player can earn extra points in one minute bonus stages by repeatedly striking a dwarf character named Happy. There are four difficulty levels: Easy, Normal, Hard, and Super. Losing to a computer opponent will expend one credit, allowing the player to try the match again, while losing with no credits left will result in a game over. A two-player versus option allows human competitors to fight against one another with any of the game's eight fighters.

== Development and release ==
Screenshots comparing the game's Japanese version (top) and the heavily altered character sprites and background in the localized version (bottom).

The original Japanese version of Street Combat, titled Ranma ½: Chōnai Gekitōhen, was developed for the Super Famicom by NCS Corporation and would be published under its Masaya Games label in Japan on March 27, 1992. It is based on the manga series Ranma ½ by Rumiko Takahashi, which is centered around its titular protagonist, Ranma Saotome, a cursed martial artist who switches genders when exposed to either cold water or warm water. The plot of the game features Ranma competing in a fighting competition to win a trip to China in order to reverse the curse.

Graphical designer Hitoshi Ariga recounted that after the completion of Masaya's Cyber Citizen Shockman 3: The Princess from Another World he was promptly asked by company producer Toshiro Tsuchida to join the Chōnai Gekitōhen team midway through the latter's creation. As Ranma ½ was focused on martial arts, it was decided that it should be a fighting game. Despite the explosive popularity of Capcom's arcade hit Street Fighter II during this period, Hitoshi doubted that copying its style was ever a consideration as Chōnai Gekitōhen featured a simpler control scheme more akin to action games of the time. The characters were made graphically similarly to Ultraman: Towards the Future with sprites animated with independent, angled parts. Character body parts were divided into banks of pixels made up from the dot matrix of the Super Famicom's display. Ariga claimed that he was unable to achieve the smooth animation or detail from his initial sketches when restricting their motions to these banks.

When Irem localized the game outside Japan, numerous changes were made to remove all connections to Ranma ½. This was possibly due to the series being relatively unknown in the region at the time, licensing issues, or an attempt to better appeal to Western audiences. A new story was written and all the sprites and artwork depicting its characters were replaced. Male Ranma became the blue-armored Steven; female Ranma became the armorless Steven; Genma Saotome became Tyrone; Kodachi Kuno became Dozo; Tatewaki Kuno became G.I. Jim; Principal Kuno became Helmut; Shampoo became Lita; Ryoga Hibiki became C.J.; and Happosai and Cologne were combined into the character Happy. Alterations were also made to the music and backgrounds. Street Combat was released by Irem in North America in April 1993 and was distributed in Europe by Playtime Software in July 1993.

== Reception ==
Reception

Review scores
Publication	Score
Famitsu	8/10, 8/10, 7/10, 5/10 (Note: Japanese version)
Joystick	92%
VideoGames & Computer Entertainment	4/10
Game Power	8.25/10
Super Control	28%
Super Pro	34/100
Super NES Buyers Guide	43%/40%/45%
Video Games	39%

Critical reception for the original Japanese Ranma ½: Chōnai Gekitōhen was mostly favorable. The game was compared to the arcade hit Street Fighter II, which had yet to make its way to home consoles at the time. Jean-Marc Demoly of the French publication Joystick gushed over its variety of attacks, fluid animation, detailed backgrounds, and audio design. In a brief import review, GamePro contributor Dave Winstead similarly called it "a blast in two-player mode" and concluded, "This isn’t quite Street Fighter II, but it's as close as you can get right now on the Super Famicom!" The game was received warmly by a panel of four reviewers in Japanese magazine Famitsu, though a few of them noted an extreme difficulty from the CPU opponents and a general lack of polish. In a later retrospective, Hardcore Gaming 101 was highly critical of its control responsiveness, hit detection, graphics, and sound.

Street Combat yielded mostly negative reactions to its gameplay and to the quality of its graphical alterations during localization. Hardcore Gaming 101 described it as "exactly the same game as Chōnai Gekitōhen, except totally embarrassing" and panned the graphically altered cast of characters as "a bunch of World Heroes and Street Fighter 2010 rejects. Zach Meston of VideoGames & Computer Entertainment felt that Irem should have kept the Ranma ½ license and only have made alterations required by Nintendo of America in order to retain the original version's sense of humor. He criticized the difficulty in executing special moves and a lack of challenge in its single-player mode. The staff of Super NES Buyers Guide was equally bothered by the changes, finding the presentation and gameplay subpar. Super Control writer Paul Mallinson labeled the game a "graphical and aural travesty", faulted the game for having a "one move conquers all" mechanic, and likened its control with playing Street Fighter II with a breeze block for a joypad. Mark Wynne of SuperPro considered the game's release a "black day for the Super Nintendo," citing uninspired visuals, a lack of enemy AI, and poorly implemented, cliché mechanics. Christian Bornemühl of the German magazine Video Games found it be a bland Street Fighter imitation with too few stages, small sprites, and poorly animated environments.

The number of available attacks received some praise. Though he thought Street Fighter II was superior in every regard, Matt Taylor of GamePro had a more positive opinion of Street Combat overall, denoting it "a mid-ranked contender" among SNES fighters. Despite Nintendo Power labeling its animation as "jerky" and finding a lack of depth from its limited character roster, the magazine was still complimentary the challenge presented by the computer opponents at the higher difficulty. The sound in Street Combat was generally not well-received with critics describing it as "sub-standard", "poor", "repugnant", and "blackboard-scraping." Nintendo Power alternatively found the music "good". Taylor called the soundtrack "almost gifted at times and noxiously tinny at others" while expressing distaste for the character voice effects.

== Legacy ==
A Super Famicom sequel from the same developer titled Ranma ½: Bakuretsu Rantōhen was first released in Japan in late 1992. Unlike Street Combat, the SNES version of this game from DTMC, titled Ranma ½: Hard Battle, was mostly unchanged from its Japanese counterpart. Both Chōnai Gekitōhen and Bakuretsu Rantōhen were present at the Evo Japan 2018 fighting game competition with the organizer stating that there was continuing online appeal in the series to warrant their inclusion.
