= List of Ranma ½ video games =

17 video games based on the Ranma ½ manga and anime series exist, generally in the form of fighting games, RPGs, puzzle games, and pachinko slot machines. Of all of them, only two of the Super Famicom fighting games have been adapted for Western release. They are listed below by platform.

== Super Famicom ==
Ranma ½: Super-Skill Wild Dance Chapter

=== Ranma ½: Neighborhood Combat Chapter (Ranma ½: Chōnai Gekitōhen) ===
The first fighting game for the Super Famicom by NCS Corp, Neighborhood Combat Chapter underwent Americanization by Irem to become Street Combat, replacing all characters and background music with American-themed characters. An example is Ranma, who was replaced by a blonde man in bright blue armor called Steven. This is the only fighting game in which Cologne appears.

=== Ranma ½: Hidden Treasure of the Red Cat Gang (Ranma ½: Akaneko-dan teki Hihou) ===
An RPG that was released on October 22, 1993. In 2000, it has been translated in English.

=== Ranma ½: Super-Skill Wild Dance Chapter (Ranma ½: Chougi Rambuhen) ===
This game was intended to be released in the USA under the title "Anything Goes Martial Arts" as the sequel to Hard Battle, but the company that owned the rights for it went out of business, Eventually the North American release got cancelled. This is the only game to feature Mariko Konjo and Herb. The game is known for significant slowdown issues, with the frame rate consistently falling short of a stable 60 frames per second. In 2024, a rom hack was released that patched the issue.

=== Ranma ½: Rock-Scissors-Puzzle (Ranma ½: Ougi Jaanken) ===
A puzzle game based on rock, paper, scissors. Hands are dropped showing the rock, paper, and scissor signs and are used to remove other hands that have the opposite sign. Its Japanese name is composed of ougi (meaning secret) and jaanken, a play on the word janken (the Japanese name for the game of rock-paper-scissors) but using the characters for evil, dark and fist. However, the furigana reading above the Japanese name is Guu•Choki•Pazuru, which translates to Rock-Scissors-Puzzle.

On release, Famicom Tsūshin scored the game a 20 out of 40.

== Mega-CD ==
=== Ranma ½: White Orchid Serenade (Ranma ½: Byakuran Aika) ===
Ranma ½: White Orchid Serenade

A video visual novel which uses a Rock-Paper-Scissors style battle system. It was released on April 23, 1993, for the Sega Mega-CD and introduces the character Arisa Nanjo (depicted in the center on the cover).

== PlayStation ==
=== Ranma ½: Battle Renaissance ===
Ranma ½: Battle Renaissance

The only 3D Ranma ½ video game, developed by Atelier Double and published by Rumic Soft for the PlayStation in 1996. This game features changing weather conditions that turn some characters to their cursed forms or vice versa when they get soaked in cold or hot water, affecting strategy. This is the only fighting game in which Ryu Kumon and Rouge appear. After playing the game at the November 1996 PlayStation Expo, Stuart Levy and Ed Semrad of Electronic Gaming Monthly commented, "Hopefully somebody will pick up this excellent game here in the States."

== Game Boy ==
=== Ranma ½ (Ranma ½: Kakuren Bodesu Match) ===
Similar to the Adventures of Lolo, this game features Ranma pushing and breaking blocks around a maze-like environment. The player could change gender in order to move blocks greater or shorter distances as needed.

=== Ranma ½: Vehement Melee Chapter (Ranma ½: Netsuretsu Kakutouhen) ===
An RPG with fighting game elements, this game immerses the player in a day in Ranma's life, traveling to various locations in the series and fighting various characters.

=== Ranma ½: Character Q&A!! (Ranma ½: Kakugeki Mondou!!) ===
Using a top-down view similar to the first Ranma ½ Game Boy game, this game primarily focuses on trivia from the Ranma ½ anime. The player moves Ranma around town and encounters various characters who ask questions regarding the series.

== PC Engine CD-ROM²/Super CD-ROM² ==
=== Ranma ½ ===
A side-scrolling fighting game where the player moves Ranma through various locations. Following the manga story line up to Ranma's second battle with Ryoga, the game also included animated cutscenes.

=== Ranma ½: The Captive Bride (Ranma ½: Toraware no Hanayome) ===
Similar to White Orchid Serenade, this game combines video visual novel elements with text-based commands.

The game was rated 22.38 out of 30 by PC Engine Fan magazine.

=== Ranma ½: Knockdown, The Founder's Anything-Goes Melee-Style! (Ranma ½: Datou, Ganso Musabetsu Kakutou-ryuu!) ===
A one on one fighting game, this game follows the next major story arc of the Ranma ½ manga.

== PC ==
=== Ranma ½: Flying Dragon Legend (Ranma ½: Hiryu Densetsu) ===
A point-and-click adventure for the NEC PC-9800 and MSX personal computers. In this game, the player takes the role of Ranma as he/she interacts with situations and characters via on-screen icons, only occasionally involving combat by using a multiple-option interface.

== Pachinko ==
=== Fever Ranma ½: Hot Springs Athletic Chapter (Fever Ranma ½: Onsen Asurechikku Hen) ===
Released in February 2011 in Japan, Fever Ranma ½ features high-quality animations and sound effects with the newer anime style look from Nightmare! Incense of Spring Sleep.

=== Pachislot Ranma 1/2 (2013) ===
Released on February 4, 2013, in Japan. Another Pachinko installment, featuring the same artstyle and all the voice actors from the original anime.

=== Pachislot Ranma 1/2 (2018) ===
Released on November 5, 2018, in Japan, despite having same name as the prior iteration, it is a new installment with differing content, developed by Pachi Seven instead of Sankyo. Features reanimated high definition cutscenes from the original anime with the new artstyle using the original voice actors.

== Others ==
Two Nintendo DS games were released in 2009, titled Sunday x Magazine: Nettou Dream Nine and Sunday x Magazine: White Comic. The first is a baseball game that commemorates the 50th anniversary of Weekly Shōnen Sunday and Weekly Shōnen Magazine, featuring characters from manga series that ran in the magazines. The second is an RPG that features over 300 characters from the magazines' series. Ranma ½ characters appear in both these games—Ranma and Akane in the first, and Ranma, Akane, Ryoga and Shampoo in the second.

In Yo-kai Watch Wibble Wobble, released on October 21, 2015, Weekly Shōnen Sunday characters from Urusei Yatsura, Ranma ½, Inuyasha and Ushio & Tora are featured. In School Girl Strikers 2, released on May 8, 2018, Lum and Ranma appear along with costumes based on Lum, Ranma, Tomobiki High school girl outfits, Benten and Ukyo. In The Battle Cats, released on September 17, 2014, The characters from Ranma ½ are featured as Ranma ½ Collaboration Event (April 12 to 26, 2021). Ranma Saotome (male and female), Akane Tendo, Ryoga and Shampoo appears in the mobile game Power Pros App as new collaboration characters.

== Sortable game list ==
| English title/translation | Japanese title | Developer | Publisher | Genre | Console(s) | Initial release date |
|---|---|---|---|---|---|---|
| Pachislot Ranma 1/2 (2013) | Pachislot Ranma 1/2 (2013) | Sankyo | Sankyo | Arcade | Pachinko^{JP} | February 4, 2013 |
| Pachislot Ranma 1/2 (2018) | Pachislot Ranma 1/2 (2018) | Pachi Seven | Pachi Seven | Arcade | Pachinko^{JP} | November 5, 2018 |
| Ranma ½ | Ranma ½ Kakuren Bodesu Match | Banpresto | Banpresto | Puzzle (Maze) | Game Boy^{JP} | June 28, 1990 |
| Ranma ½ | Ranma ½ | NCS | Masaya | Fighting (Side Scrolling) | PC Engine CD-ROM²^{JP} | December 7, 1990 |
| Ranma ½: Battle Renaissance | Ranma ½: Battle Renaissance | Atelier Double | Shogakukan | Fighting | PlayStation^{JP} | December 6, 1996 |
| Ranma ½: The Captive Bride | Ranma ½: Toraware no Hanayome | NCS | Masaya | Digital Comic | PC Engine CD-ROM²^{JP} | December 6, 1991 |
| Ranma ½: Character Q&A!! | Ranma ½: Kakugeki Mondou!! | Banpresto | Banpresto | RPG (Quiz) | Game Boy^{JP} | August 6, 1993 |
| Fever Ranma ½: Hot Springs Athletic Chapter | Fever Ranma ½: Onsen Asurechikku Hen | Sankyo | Sankyo | Arcade | Pachinko^{JP} | February 2011 |
| Ranma ½: Flying Dragon Legend | Ranma ½: Hiryu Densetsu | Microvision | Bothtec | Text Adventure | PC-98^{JP} MSX^{JP} | 1992 |
| Ranma ½: Hard Battle (Ranma ½: Explosive Brawl Chapter) | Ranma ½: Bakuretsu Rantōhen | Atelier Double | Masaya; DTMC | Fighting | SF^{JP} SNES^{NA} ^{EU} | December 25, 1992 |
| Ranma ½: Hidden Treasure of the Red Cat Gang | Ranma ½: Akaneko-dan teki Hihou | Rumic Soft | Toho Company Ltd. | RPG | SF^{JP} | October 22, 1993 |
| Ranma ½: Knockdown, The Founder's Anything-Goes Melee-Style! | Ranma ½: Datou, Ganso Musabetsu Kakutou-ryuu! | NCS | Masaya | Fighting (Side Scrolling) | PC Engine Super CD-ROM²^{JP} | October 2, 1992 |
| Ranma ½: Rock-Scissors-Puzzle | Ranma ½: Ougi Jaanken | Rumic Soft | Rumic Soft | Puzzle (Paper-Rock-Scissors/Tetris) | SF^{JP} PC-98^{JP} | July 21, 1995 |
| Street Combat (Ranma ½: Neighborhood Combat Chapter) | Ranma ½: Chōnai Gekitōhen | NCS; Irem | Masaya; Irem | Fighting | SF^{JP} SNES^{NA} | March 27, 1992 |
| Ranma ½: Super-Skill Wild Dance Chapter | Ranma ½: Chougi Rambuhen | Rumic Soft | Toho Company Ltd. | Fighting | SF^{JP} | April 28, 1994 |
| Ranma ½: Vehement Melee Chapter | Ranma ½: Netsuretsu Kakutouhen | Banpresto | Banpresto | RPG (Fighter) | Game Boy^{JP} | July 17, 1992 |
| Ranma ½: White Orchid Serenade | Ranma ½: Byakuran Aika | NCS | Masaya | Digital Comic | Mega-CD^{JP} | April 23, 1993 |
