= Ranma ½ =

Japanese manga series

- First tankōbon volume cover, featuring Ranma Saotome and his father transformed into a woman and a panda respectively

らんま1/2 (Ranma Nibun-no-Ichi)
- Genre: Adventure; Martial arts; Romantic comedy
- Manga
- Written by: Rumiko Takahashi
- Published by: Shogakukan
- English publisher: AUS: Madman Entertainment; NA: Viz Media
- Imprint: Shōnen Sunday Comics
- Magazine: Weekly Shōnen Sunday
- Original run: August 19, 1987 – March 6, 1996
- Volumes: 38
Further information
Anime television series
Ranma ½ (#1–18); Ranma ½ Nettōhen (#19–161)
Directed by	Tomomi Mochizuki (#1–18); Tsutomu Shibayama (#1–18); Koji Sawai (#19–161); Junji Nishimura (#19–161)
Produced by	Yoko Matsushita; Makoto Kubo; Hidenori Taga (#1–18, (executive #19–161)); Yoshinobu Nakao (#1–18); Takashi Ishihara (#19–161); Koji Kaneda (#19–161); Hiroshi Hasegawa (#19–161); Junpei Nakagawa (#19–161); Kei Ijichi (#19–161)
Music by	Hideharu Mori; Kenji Kawai
Studio	Studio Deen
Licensed by	AUS: Madman Entertainment; NA: Viz Media
Original network	FNS (Fuji TV)
English network	PH: TV5; SEA: Animax; US: KTEH
Original run	April 15, 1989 – September 25, 1992
Episodes	161
Anime film
Ranma ½: Big Trouble in Nekonron, China
Directed by	Shuji Iuchi
Produced by	Hidenori Taga (executive); Yoko Matsushita; Hiroshi Hasegawa
Written by	Ryota Yamaguchi; Shuji Iuchi; Shigeru Yanagawa
Music by	Kenji Kawai
Studio	Studio Deen
Licensed by	AUS: Madman Entertainment; NA: Viz Media; UK: MVM Films
Released	November 2, 1991
Runtime	77 minutes
Anime film
Ranma ½: Nihao My Concubine
Directed by	Akira Suzuki
Produced by	Kei Ijichi (executive); Yoko Matsushita; Motoko Naritome; Hiroshi Hasegawa
Written by	Ryota Yamaguchi
Music by	Akihisa Matsūra
Studio	Studio Deen
Licensed by	AUS: Madman Entertainment; NA: Viz Media; UK: MVM Films
Released	August 1, 1992
Runtime	65 minutes
Original video animation
Directed by	Junji Nishimura
Produced by	Ayao Ueda; Junpei Nakagawa; Kenji Kume
Music by	Akihisa Matsūra
Studio	Studio Deen
Licensed by	NA: Viz Media
Released	October 21, 1993 – August 19, 1994
Runtime	30 minutes
Episodes	6
Anime film
Ranma ½: Super Indiscriminate Decisive Battle! Team Ranma vs. the Legendary Phoenix
Directed by	Junji Nishimura
Produced by	Ayao Ueda; Junpei Nakagawa; Kenji Kume
Written by	Ryota Yamaguchi
Music by	Akihisa Matsūra; Kenji Kawai
Studio	Studio Deen
Licensed by	NA: Viz Media
Released	August 20, 1994
Runtime	28 minutes
Original video animation
Ranma ½ Special
Directed by	Junji Nishimura
Produced by	Ayao Ueda; Junpei Nakagawa; Kenji Kume
Music by	Akihisa Matsūra; Kenji Kawai
Studio	Studio Deen
Licensed by	NA: Viz Media
Released	December 16, 1994 – February 17, 1995
Runtime	27 minutes
Episodes	2
Original video animation
Ranma ½ Super
Directed by	Junji Nishimura
Produced by	Ayao Ueda; Junpei Nakagawa; Kenji Kume
Music by	Akihisa Matsūra; Kenji Kawai
Studio	Studio Deen
Licensed by	NA: Viz Media
Released	September 21, 1995 – January 19, 1996
Runtime	28 minutes
Episodes	3
Original video animation
Ranma ½: Nightmare! Incense of Spring Sleep
Directed by	Takeshi Mori
Music by	Kohei Tanaka
Studio	Studio Deen; Sunrise
Released	July 30, 2008
Runtime	32 minutes
Live-action television film
Directed by	Ryo Nishimura
Written by	Yoshihiro Izumi
Music by	Kei Yoshikawa
Studio	Nikkatsu
Original network	NNS (Nippon TV)
Released	December 9, 2011
Runtime	95 minutes
Related media
Ranma ½ specials; Ranma ½ video games; Ranma ½ (2024 TV series)
- icon

Ranma ½ (Japanese: らんま1/2, Hepburn: Ranma Nibun-no-Ichi; pronounced Ranma One-Half in English) is a Japanese manga series written and illustrated by Rumiko Takahashi. It was serialized in Weekly Shōnen Sunday from August 1987 to March 1996, with the chapters collected in 38 tankōbon volumes by Shogakukan. The story revolves around a teenager named Ranma Saotome who has trained in martial arts since early childhood. As a result of an accident during a training journey, he is cursed to become a girl when exposed to cold water, while hot water changes him back into a boy. Throughout the series Ranma seeks out a way to rid himself of his curse, while his friends, enemies, and many fiancées constantly hinder and interfere.

Ranma ½ has a comedic formula and a sex-changing main character who often willfully transforms into a girl to advance his goals. The series also contains many other characters, whose intricate relationships with each other, unusual characteristics, and eccentric personalities drive most of the stories. Although the characters and their relationships are complicated, they rarely change once they are firmly introduced and settled into the series.

The manga has been adapted into two anime series produced by Studio Deen: Ranma ½ and Ranma ½ Nettōhen, which together were broadcast on Fuji TV from 1989 to 1992. In addition, they released 12 OVAs and three films. In 2011, a live-action television special was produced and aired on Nippon Television. Another anime adaptation produced by MAPPA premiered on October 6, 2024, broadcasting on Nippon Television and streaming on Netflix. The manga and anime series were licensed by Viz Media for English-language releases in North America. Madman Entertainment released the manga, part of the anime series, and the first two films in Australasia, while MVM Films released the first two films in the United Kingdom.

The Ranma ½ manga has over 55 million copies in circulation, making it one of the best-selling manga series of all time. Both the manga and anime are cited as among the first in their respective media to have become popular in the United States.

== Plot ==
On a training journey in the Bayankala Mountain Range in the Qinghai Province of China, Ranma Saotome and his father Genma fell into the cursed springs of Jusenkyo (呪泉郷). The cursed spring causes any afflicted to assume the physical form of whatever drowned there hundreds or thousands of years ago whenever they come into contact with cold water, which reverts on contact with hot water but resumes with exposure to cold water. Genma fell into the spring of a drowned panda while Ranma fell into the spring of a drowned girl.

Soun Tendo is a fellow practitioner of Musabetsu Kakutō Ryū (無差別格闘流) or "Anything-Goes School" of martial arts and owner of a dojo in Nerima. Genma and Soun agreed years ago that their children would marry and carry on the Tendo Dojo. Soun has three teenage daughters: the polite and easygoing Kasumi, the greedy and indifferent Nabiki and the short-tempered, martial arts practicing Akane. Akane, who is Ranma's age, is appointed for bridal duty by her sisters with the reasoning that they are the older sisters and can dump the duty on her, and that they all dislike the arranged engagement and think Akane's dislike of men is the right way to express it to the fathers. At the appointed time, the Saotomes arrive in their new forms given by the cursed springs, confusing the Tendos, and ultimately leading to Akane seeing Ranma changing from girl form to boy form in the tub, much to her horror. It takes several more pages for the situation to be explained to Soun Tendo and his daughters. Both Ranma and Akane refuse the engagement initially, having not been consulted on the decision, but the fathers are insistent and they are generally treated as betrothed and end up helping or saving each other on some occasions. They are frequently found in each other's company and are constantly arguing in their trademark awkward love-hate manner that is a franchise focus.

Ranma goes to school with Akane at Furinkan High School (風林館高校, Fūrinkan Kōkō), where he meets his recurring opponent Tatewaki Kuno, the conceited kendo team captain who aggressively pursues Akane, but also falls in love with Ranma's female form without ever discovering his curse (despite most other characters eventually knowing it). Nerima serves as a backdrop for more martial arts mayhem with the introduction of Ranma's regular rivals, such as the eternally lost Ryoga Hibiki who traveled halfway across Japan getting from the front of his house to the back, where Ranma spent three days waiting for him. Ryoga, seeking revenge on Ranma, followed him to Jusenkyo where he ultimately fell into the Spring of the Drowned Piglet. Now when splashed with cold water he takes the form of a little black pig. Not knowing this, Akane takes the piglet as a pet and names it P-chan, but Ranma knows and hates him for keeping this secret and taking advantage of the situation. Another rival is the nearsighted Mousse, who also fell into a cursed spring and becomes a duck when he gets wet, and finally, there is Genma and Soun's impish grand master, Happosai, who spends his time stealing the underwear of schoolgirls.

Ranma's prospective paramours include the martial arts rhythmic gymnastics champion (and Tatewaki's sister) Kodachi Kuno, and his second fiancée and childhood friend Ukyo Kuonji the okonomiyaki vendor, along with the Chinese Amazon Shampoo, supported by her great-grandmother Cologne. As the series progresses, the school becomes more eccentric with the return of the demented, Hawaii-obsessed Principal Kuno and the placement of the power-leeching alternating child/adult Hinako Ninomiya as Ranma's English teacher. Ranma's indecision in choosing his true love causes chaos in his romantic and school life.

== Production ==
Rumiko Takahashi stated that Ranma ½ was conceived to be a martial arts manga that connects all aspects of everyday life to martial arts. Because her previous series had female protagonists, the author decided that she wanted a male this time. However, she was worried about writing a male main character; therefore Takahashi decided to make him half-female. According to Takahashi, the idea of making Ranma "just kinda popped into [her] head", and she looked for a way to make it possible for him to go back and forth between genders. It was then when she had a vision of a bathhouse's cloth entrance sign. She considered Ranma changing every time he was punched before deciding on water for initiating his changes. That decision led her to feeling that Jusenkyo had to be set in China, as it is the only place that could have such mysterious springs. She drew inspiration for Ranma ½ from a variety of real-world objects. Some of the places frequently seen in the series are modeled after actual locations in Nerima, Tokyo (both the home of Takahashi and the setting of Ranma ½).

In a 1990 interview with Amazing Heroes, Takahashi stated that she had four assistants that draw the backgrounds, panel lines and tone, while she creates the story and layout, and pencils and inks the characters. All her assistants are female; Takahashi stated that "I don't use male assistants so that the girls will work more seriously if they aren't worried about boys." In 1992, she explained her process as beginning with laying out the chapter in the evening so as to finish it by dawn, and resting for a day before calling her assistants. They finish it in two or three nights, usually utilizing five days for a chapter.

Takahashi purposefully aimed the series to be popular with women and children. In 1993, an Animerica interviewer talking with Takahashi asked her if she intended the sex-changing theme "as an effort to enlighten a male-dominated society". Takahashi said that she does not think in terms of societal agendas and that she created the Ranma ½ concept from simply wanting "a simple, fun idea". She added that she, as a woman and while recalling what manga she liked to read as a child, felt that "humans turning into animals might also be fun and märchenhaft... you know, like a fairy tale." In 2013, she revealed that at the start of Ranma her editor told her to make it more dramatic, but she felt that was something she could not do. However, she admitted that drama did start to appear at the end. She also sat in on the voice actor auditions for the anime, where she insisted that male and female Ranma be voiced by different actors whose gender corresponded to that of the part.

== Media ==
=== Manga ===
Written and illustrated by Rumiko Takahashi, Ranma ½ began publication in the shōnen manga anthology Weekly Shōnen Sunday issue #36 published on August 19, 1987, following the ending of her series Urusei Yatsura. From August 1987 until March 1996, the manga was published on a near weekly basis with the occasional colored page to spruce up the usually black and white stories. After nearly a decade of storylines, the final chapter was published in Weekly Shōnen Sunday issue #12 on March 6, 1996. The 407 chapters were periodically collected and published by Shogakukan into a total of 38 black and white tankōbon volumes from 1988 to 1996. They were reassembled in 38 shinsōban from April 2002 to October 2003. A Shōnen Sunday Special edition for all 20 volumes was published from 2016 to 2018. This edition included a series of interviews with Rumiko Takahashi called The Making of Ranma.

North American publisher Viz Media originally released Ranma ½ in a monthly comic book format that contained two chapters each from 1992 to 2003, and had the images "flipped" to read left-to-right, causing the art to be mirrored. These were periodically collected into graphic novels. On March 18, 2004, after releasing 21 volumes, Viz announced that it would reprint a number of its graphic novels. The content remained the same, but the novels moved to a smaller format with different covers and a price drop. Each volume covers roughly the same amount of material as the Japanese volumes, but retained its left-to-right format and had minor differences in grouping so that it spans 36 volumes rather than the original 38. The final volume was released in stores on November 14, 2006, thus making it Viz's longest running manga, spanning over 13 years. At Anime Expo on July 7, 2013, Viz Media announced re-release of the manga in a format that combines two individual volumes into a single large one, and restores the original right-to-left reading order (a first in North America for this series). The first 2-in-1 book (volumes 1–2) was published on March 11, 2014; the final (volumes 35–36) on March 14, 2017. On July 27, 2021, Viz released all 19 2-in-1 books digitally. Madman Entertainment publishes the two-in-one version in Australasia.

Together with Spriggan, it was the first manga published in Portugal, by Texto Editora in 1995.

=== 1989–1992 anime series ===
An anime television series was created by Studio Deen and aired weekly between April 15, 1989, and September 16, 1989, on Fuji TV for 18 episodes, before being canceled due to low ratings. The series was then reworked by most of the same staff, retitled Ranma ½ Nettōhen (らんま 1/2 熱闘編) and launched in a different time slot, running for 143 episodes from October 20, 1989, to September 25, 1992. The anime stays true to the original manga but does differ by keeping Ranma's gender transformation a secret from the high school students, at least throughout most of its length. It also does not introduce Hikaru Gosunkugi until very late in the series, instead, Sasuke Sarugakure, the diminutive ninja retainer of the Kuno family fills a number of Gosunkugi's roles in early storylines but is a major character in his own right. The anime also alters the placement of many story arcs and contains numerous original episodes and characters not adapted from the manga.

Viz Media licensed both anime series in 1993, making Ranma ½ one of the first anime titles licensed by Viz. The English dub produced for the series was recorded by The Ocean Group in Vancouver, British Columbia. They released the series on VHS from their own Viz Video label, and on DVD a few years later in association with Pioneer Home Entertainment. Their releases collected both anime series as one, separated episodes into what they call "seasons", and changed the ordering of many of the episodes. Viz themselves re-released it on DVD in 2007 using their own DVD production company. At Otakon 2013, Viz announced that they re-acquired the TV series for Blu-ray and DVD release in 2014. The show is streamed on their anime channel service Neon Alley since Autumn 2013. In September 2020, Toonami co-creator Jason DeMarco revealed that he had previously tried to get Ranma ½ aired on the American TV programming block, but "it's something we never were able to figure out, because, frankly, there's too much nudity". Madman Entertainment licensed some of the series for release in Australasia, although their rights expired after releasing only the first four "seasons" as one series.

The original (1989–1992) anime adapts 56% of the manga, or 229 chapters, 22 volumes out of the 38.

=== Films and original video animations ===
Studio Deen also created three theatrical films; The Battle of Nekonron, China! A Battle to Defy the Rules! on November 2, 1991; Battle at Togenkyo! Get Back the Brides on August 1, 1992; and Super Indiscriminate Decisive Battle! Team Ranma vs. the Legendary Phoenix on August 20, 1994. The first two films are feature length, but the third was originally shown in theaters with two other films: Ghost Sweeper Mikami and Heisei Dog Stories: Bow.

Following the ending of the TV series, 11 original video animations were released directly to home video, the earliest on December 7, 1993, and the eleventh on June 4, 1996. All but two are based on stories originally in the manga. Twelve years later, a Ranma animation was created for the "It's a Rumic World" exhibition of Rumiko Takahashi's artwork. Based on the "Nightmare! Incense of Deep Sleep" manga story from volume 34, it was shown on odd numbered days at the exhibition in Tokyo from July 30 to August 11, 2008. But it was not released on video until January 29, 2010, when it was put in a DVD box set with the Urusei Yatsura and Inuyasha specials that premiered at the same exhibit. It was then released on DVD and Blu-ray by itself on October 20, 2010. Viz Media also licensed all three films, and the original 11 OVAs for distribution in North America (however they released the third film as an OVA). MVM Films has released the first two films in the United Kingdom, while Madman Entertainment released them in Australasia.

=== 2024–present anime series ===
A new anime remake series, simply titled Ranma ½, is produced by MAPPA, with Shogakukan-Shueisha Productions handling planning and production duties. The series is directed by Kōnosuke Uda, with Kimiko Ueno handling series composition, Hiromi Taniguchi designing the characters, and Kaoru Wada composing the music. Most of the original Japanese voice cast for the main characters reprise their roles. The first season aired from October 6 to December 22, 2024, on Nippon Television and its affiliates, (Note: Nippon TV listed the series premiere as airing on Saturday, October 5, 2024 at 24:55, which is effectively Sunday, October 6 at 12:55 a.m. JST. All episodes have used this time slot.) with Netflix licensing it for streaming worldwide weekly after the Japanese broadcast. A second season aired from October 5 to December 21, 2025, on the same television network and its affiliates. A third season is set to premiere on October 4, 2026.

=== Video games ===
There have been seventeen video games based on the Ranma ½ franchise. While most are fighting games, there have been several RPGs, puzzle games, and Pachinko slot machines. The most recent game is Pachislot Ranma 1/2, released on November 5, 2018, for Pachinko. Only two have been released in Western countries. Ranma ½: Chōnai Gekitōhen was released in the US as Street Combat; the characters were Americanized, having their appearances completely changed, and the music was changed as well. However, Ranma ½: Hard Battle was released in both North America and Europe unaltered.

=== Live-action special ===
Poster for the Ranma ½ TV drama, featuring the cast and artwork by Rumiko Takahashi

A live action television adaption of Ranma ½ aired on Nippon Television, in a two-hour time-slot, on December 9, 2011. Although it was initially reported that the special would contain an original story, the film does take its main plot from one of the manga's early stories with several other early scenes mixed in. The special stars Yui Aragaki as Akane, with Kento Kaku and Natsuna Watanabe playing male and female Ranma respectively. Ryōsei Tayama is cast as the antagonist, the new original character Okamada. The all-girl pop group 9nine contribute "Chikutaku☆2Nite" as the theme song. It was released on both DVD and Blu-ray on March 21, 2012.

=== Other media ===
The Ranma ½ Memorial Book was published just as the manga ended in 1996. Acting as an end-cap to the series, it collects various illustrations from the series, features an interview with Takahashi, and includes tidbits about Ranma: summaries of his battles, his daily schedule, trivia, and a few exclusive illustrations. A Movie + OVA Visual Comic was released to illustrate the theatrical film Super Indiscriminate Decisive Battle! Team Ranma vs. the Legendary Phoenix and the OVA episodes The One to Carry On (both parts). It also included information on the voice actors, character designs, and a layout of the Tendo dojo.

Additionally, guidebooks were released for three of the Ranma ½ video games; these included not only strategies, but also interviews. Two books including interviews with the cast of the live-action TV drama, and some select stories, were released in 2011.

The music from the Ranma ½ TV series, films and OVAs have been released on various CDs. Four from the TV series, two from the first film, one from the second, one from the third film and OVAs, and three compiling the music by DoCo used in the OVAs. DoCo is a pop group composed of the anime's main female characters' voice actresses. Several compilation albums were also released, some composed of the opening and closing theme songs and others of image songs. Many of the image songs were first released as singles.

== Reception ==
By November 2006, it was reported that Ranma ½ had sold over 49 million manga volumes in Japan. Shogakukan has printed 53 million copies as of November 2011, and by April 2021 it had 55 million copies in circulation.

The Ranma ½ anime was ranked number 17 on Anime Insider's 2001 list of the Top 50 Anime, although the list was limited to series that were released in North America. It ranked 36th on TV Asahi's 2006 list of Japan's 100 favorite animated TV series, which is based on an online poll of the Japanese people, up from the previous year's list where it ranked 45th. In November 2006, the New York Comic Con announced that it would host the first-ever American Anime Awards. Fans had the chance to vote for their favorite anime online during the month of January 2007. Only the five nominees receiving the most votes for each category were announced on February 5. Among the 12 different categories, Ranma ½ was voted into the "Best Comedy Anime" category, and the Ranma ½ OVAs were voted into the "Best Short Series" category. A 2019 NHK poll of 210,061 people saw Ranma ½ and Ranma ½ Nettōhen named Takahashi's second best-animated work. Shampoo and Ranma were voted fourth and fifth place respectively in her characters category.

Although Lum from Takahashi's first series Urusei Yatsura is often cited as the first tsundere character in anime and manga, Theron Martin of Anime News Network stated that Ranma ½'s Akane Tendo is closer to how they would later typically be portrayed in the 2000s. He also suggested that one could argue Ranma is an early example of a harem or reverse harem series, due to the main character attracting suitors in both genders. The series's publication in North America proved highly successful as well, being many Americans' first introduction to manga and its anime adaptation one of the first Japanese animation shows to achieve popularity in the US. In an overview of the series, Jason Thompson called Ranma ½ "the direct ancestor of all comedy-action manga, like Sumomomo Momomo and History's Strongest Disciple Kenichi", although noted that it was not the first, but only spanned the period when manga and anime sales were at their height. Relating it to Takahashi's other works, he summed the series up as "At the start, the fighting is minimal and it's almost a semi-serious relationship comedy, like Maison Ikkoku; then it turns completely ridiculous; and by the climax, when Ranma fights the evil bird-people of Phoenix Mountain in an excessively long and un-funny fight scene, it's like a warmup for Inuyasha." Reviewing the final volume of the manga, Anime News Network remarked that "Every dimension of Rumiko Takahashi's storytelling skills come into play here: comedy, romance and introspection, and of course, high-flying fantasy martial-arts action." However, they felt some of the action scenes were hard to follow and noted that the mirroring to left-to-right format caused errors with the art. Historian Arius Raposas explored the geopolitical arena which influenced the emergence of Ranma ½ as a popular series within and outside Japan.

In their review of Viz Media's season five DVD box set, Anime News Network praised the Japanese cast's performance and the animation, but criticized the English version's slight script changes and minor voice actors while praising its main cast. They also remarked that while Ranma ½ is a classic, after a hundred episodes, the same jokes are just not funny anymore. THEM Anime Reviews' Raphael See called the television series and the OVAs "one of the funniest things [he's] ever seen, anime or otherwise" and also praised the English dub as some of the best. However, he was much more critical of the first two films particularly for both using the same damsel in distress plot. Mike Toole of Anime News Network included Big Trouble in Nekronon, China at number 83 on The Other 100 Best Anime Movies of All Time, a list of "lesser-known, lesser-loved classics", calling it "a solid action-comedy and a good, well-rounded example of the appeal of Ranma ½".

== Legacy ==
Hiroshi Aro admitted that he created Futaba-kun Change! based on Ranma ½. Western comic book artists who have cited Ranma ½ as an influence include Canadian Bryan Lee O'Malley on his series Scott Pilgrim and American Colleen Coover on her erotic series Small Favors.

Film director Makoto Shinkai mentioned that Ranma ½ served as an inspiration for the 2016 animation film Your Name. Matt Bozon, creator of the Shantae video game series, cited Ranma ½ as a big influence on his work. The title of the fourth game, Shantae: 1/2 Genie Hero, is also a tribute to the series.

In 2009, a crustacean species was discovered by Dr. Keiichi Kakui, which contains both male and female reproductive organs. It was later named Apseudes ranma in 2024, taking its name from Ranma Saotome.

The series has created and/or popularized many characteristics that have become common tropes in anime, including Akane's violent tsundere, Kodachi's distinctive noblewoman/ojou-sama laugh, and Ryoga's perpetually lost sense of direction.

== See also ==
- New half, a historical term for transgender women in Japan.
