= Ranma Saotome =

Fictional character from a manga series

- Ranma ½ character
- Ranma in his male (right) and female (left) forms, drawn by Rumiko Takahashi
- First appearance: "Here's Ranma" (1987)
- Last appearance: "The Final Chapter" (1996)
- Created by: Rumiko Takahashi
- Portrayed by: Kento Kaku (male); Natsuna Watanabe (female)
- Voiced by: Japanese; Kappei Yamaguchi (male); Megumi Hayashibara (female and child); English; Sarah Strange (male, ep. 1-64, movies, OVAs); Richard Ian Cox (male, ep. 65 onwards); Brigitta Dau (female, ep. 1-6, OVA 1-2); Venus Terzo (female, ep. 7 onwards, movies, OVA 3 onwards); David Errigo Jr. (male, 2024 series); Suzie Yeung (female, 2024 series)

In-universe information
- Full name: Ranma Saotome
- Aliases: Yoiko (良い子); Ranko (乱子)
- Species: Human
- Gender: Male and Female (born Male)
- Family: Genma Saotome (father); Nodoka Saotome (mother)
- Significant others: Akane Tendo (fiancée); Shampoo (fiancée); Ukyo Kuonji (fiancée)
- Nationality: Japanese

Ranma Saotome (Japanese: 早乙女 乱馬, Hepburn: Saotome Ranma) is a fictional character and the titular protagonist of the manga series Ranma ½, created by Rumiko Takahashi. Ranma is a Japanese teenage boy who has trained in martial arts since early childhood. As a result of falling into an enchanted spring during a training journey in China, he is cursed to transform into a girl when splashed with cold water, while hot water changes him back into a boy. Throughout the series, Ranma seeks out a way to rid himself of the curse, while his friends, enemies, rivals, and many fiancées constantly hinder and interfere.

== Creation and conception ==
Because most of her previous series had female protagonists, Rumiko Takahashi decided that she wanted a male for Ranma ½. However, she was worried about writing a male main character in a magazine targeted toward male readers, and therefore decided to make him half-female. In 1993, an Animerica interviewer asked Takahashi if she intended the sex-changing theme "as an effort to enlighten a male-dominated society." The author said that she does not think in terms of societal agendas and that she created the Ranma ½ concept from wanting "a simple, fun idea." She considered Ranma changing every time he was punched, before deciding on water for initiating his changes after thinking of noren at sentō and making the hot and cold water connection.

Takahashi said she gave the character's name a lot of thought; because the series deals with "a lot of entangled elements in an effective way" she named him Ranma taken from the proverb kaitō ranma wo tatsu (快刀乱麻を断つ), which can roughly be translated into English as "tackling plenty of tasks diligently." However, when asked how she came up with it in another interview years later, Takahashi simply said she thought it would be a cute name for either a boy or girl. Male Ranma's name is written using kanji, while Female Ranma's name is written in hiragana as らんま. The manga artist gave Ranma a pigtail to make the character easy to identify regardless of whether he was in his male or female form. Because a pigtail pairs well with Chinese clothes, she then decided to make him a martial artist.

Takahashi said that Ranma's personality ended up different from how she initially intended; "I originally intended for him to be a clean-cut, incredibly energetic kid who was into fighting. But, he became somewhat indecisive and picky." She speculated that, since everyone has those kinds of sentiments, these were her own feelings subconsciously reflected in her character. When Takahashi was asked if there was a connection between the characters Ryunosuke Fujinami and her father from her previous manga Urusei Yatsura and the characters of Ranma and his father Genma, the author said "Perhaps there is something in their relationship, that has crossed over to the relationship between Ranma and Genma. I think that could be true." In 1994, Takahashi said she was planning to have Ranma and Akane Tendo end up together at the end of Ranma ½.

Takahashi sat in on the voice actor auditions for the anime adaptation and, when both male and female Ranma were going to be voiced by the same actor, she insisted that they be voiced by different actors whose gender corresponded to that of the part. In Japanese, Ranma's male form is voiced by Kappei Yamaguchi and his female form by Megumi Hayashibara. The character was Yamaguchi's debut voice acting role. Hayashibara actually auditioned to play Akane Tendo, but was chosen to be the female half of Ranma instead. In English, male Ranma was voiced by Sarah Strange in the OVAs, films and first 64 episodes of the TV anime, before Richard Ian Cox took over the role. The female version of Ranma was voiced in English by Brigitta Dau for only six episodes before she was replaced by Venus Terzo. In the live-action TV film adaptation, male Ranma is portrayed by Kento Kaku and female Ranma by Natsuna Watanabe.

== Appearances ==
16-year-old Ranma Saotome was trained in martial arts by his father Genma since childhood, namely in the Musabetsu Kakutō Ryū (無差別格闘流) or "Anything-Goes" style. When Ranma was a toddler, Genma took him from home and set out on a journey, vowing to his wife that he would make their son a "true man among men." Because of this, Ranma does not remember his mother. While training in the Bayankala Mountain Range in the Qinghai Province of China, Ranma and Genma fall into the cursed springs at Jusenkyo.

When someone falls into a cursed spring, they take the physical form of whatever drowned there thousands of years ago. This will happen whenever that person comes into contact with cold water. Conversely, the curse will revert when the cursed person is exposed to hot water. Ranma fell into the spring of a drowned girl, while Genma fell into the spring of a drowned panda bear.

Two weeks after the accident, the two cursed men move in with Genma's old friend Soun Tendo at his Nerima, Tokyo home. It is expected that one of Soun Tendo's three daughters will marry Ranma. The eldest Kasumi and middle daughter Nabiki force their little sister Akane to accept the betrothal. Akane and Ranma instantly dislike each other due to Akane's mistrust of boys and Ranma's derision of her, but throughout the series, Ranma and Akane go to great lengths to save the other when in trouble, and grow in each other's esteem.

Ranma enrolls in Furinkan High School. There, he meets Tatewaki Kuno, the arrogant captain of the kendo club who is in love with Akane. Kuno falls in love with Ranma's female form, never realizing that she and male Ranma are the same person. Additionally, Kuno's younger sister, the gymnast Kodachi, soon develops a crush on the male Ranma.

Ranma's childhood rival, the perpetually lost Ryoga Hibiki, finds his way to Nerima, seeking revenge on Ranma. Hibiki also fell into a cursed spring, and now turns into a small black piglet whenever he touches cold water. Ryoga also comes to view Ranma as a rival in love when he develops a crush on Akane.

When Ranma was in China, he defeated the Chinese Amazon, Shampoo, in combat while in his female form. Shampoo's local custom dictates that the female warriors kill any woman who defeats them. So, Shampoo tracks Ranma to Nerima, where she is defeated by Ranma again, this time in his male form. The Chinese Amazon custom demands that female warriors marry any man who defeats them, and so, Shampoo pursues male Ranma as her fiancé.

Ukyo Kuonji, an okonomiyaki chef and Ranma's childhood friend, also appears in town seeking revenge. While on a training journey with a young Ranma, Genma agreed to have his son marry Ukyo in an arranged marriage with her family's okonomiyaki cart acting as the dowry. However, Genma took the cart as dowry, and left Ukyo behind.

For the next ten years, Ukyo rejects her femininity and trains to get revenge on the Saotomes. As children, Ranma did not know that Ukyo was female, and when he finds out, he calls her "cute." This act causes Ukyo to forgive the past and treat Ranma as her fiancé.

Although Ranma despises his sex-changing curse, he is not beyond using it to his advantage. For example, Ranma wishes to interfere with Ryoga's date with Akane, so he tricks his gullible Ryoga into thinking his female form is the younger sister Ryoga never knew, Yoiko.

When Ranma's mother Nodoka comes to town, and Ranma learns that his father promised her that he and his son would commit suicide via seppuku if he failed to raise Ranma into a "true man among men," Ranma passes himself off as Ranko, Akane's tomboy cousin, while Genma pretends to be Ranko's pet panda. When Nodoka finally does learn that "Ranko" is Ranma, she waives demanding seppuku and remarks that even as Ranko, her son acts "manly." However, she grabs her katana whenever she sees Ranma doing something she believes to be feminine.

== Reception ==
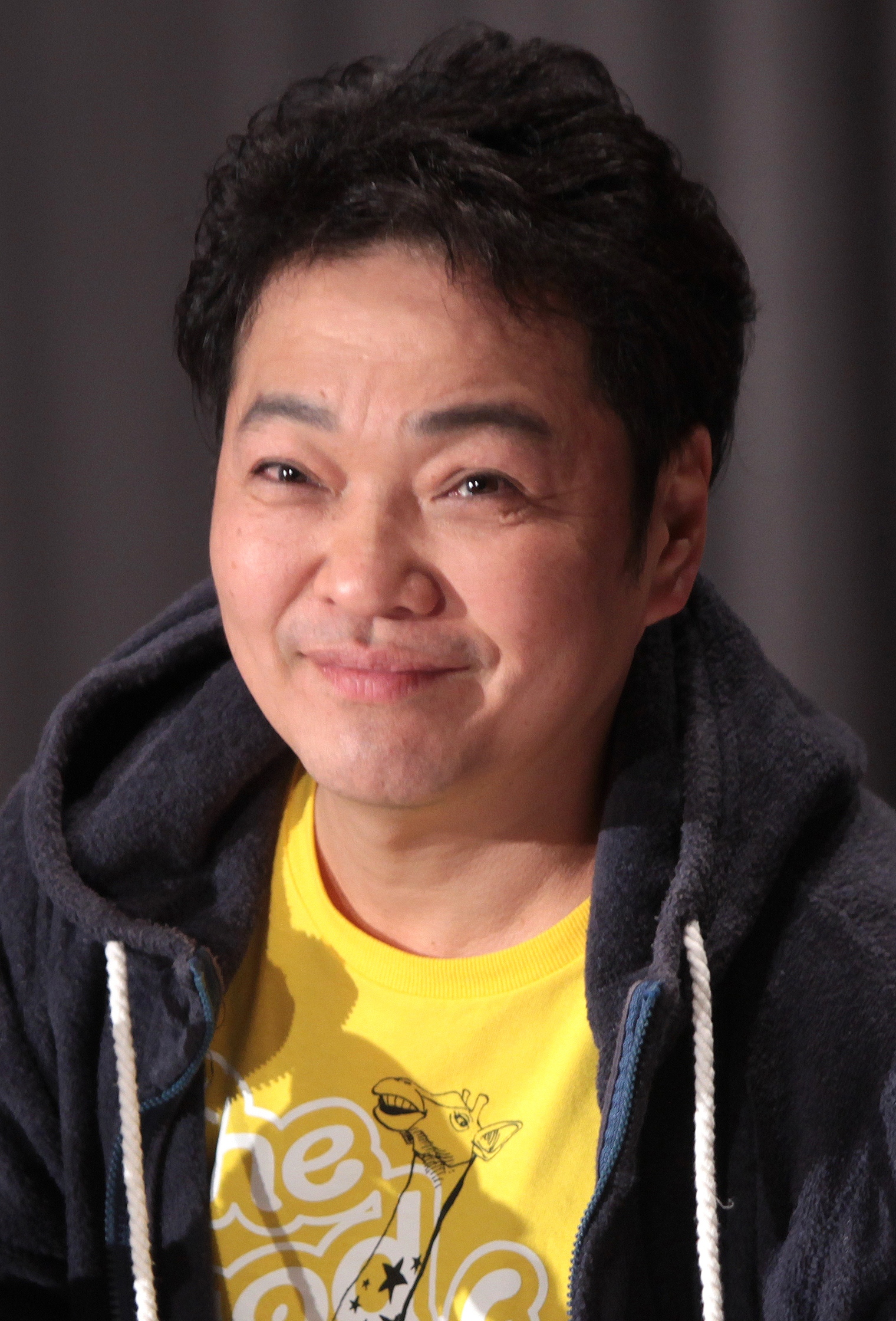
Ranma's male form was Kappei Yamaguchi's debut role as a voice actor.

In both 1990 and 1991, Ranma came in second place in Animage's annual Anime Grand Prix for Favorite Male Character and fourth in its Favorite Female Character category. Male Ranma dropped one spot to third place in 1992, while female Ranma fell to seventh. Male Ranma regained second place in 1993, but his female form fell to 12th. In 1994, Ranma came in 15th place in the male category. A 2019 NHK poll of 210,061 people saw Ranma voted the fifth favorite character from all of Rumiko Takahashi's works. In a poll conducted by goo, fans voted female Ranma their third favorite anime role performed by Megumi Hayashibara. With 18.1% of the vote, female Ranma came in first in a goo poll of 250 men and 250 women on "cute redhead girl" anime characters. Anime News Network's Gia Manry listed Ranma's engagement to Shampoo as the third Most Awkward Proposal in anime. At the 9th Crunchyroll Anime Awards, two of Ranma's international voice actors were nominated for the "Best Voice Artist Performance" category, namely Martin Faliu (French) and Florian Knorn (German); however, they lost to Kafka Hibino's Adrien Antoine and Monkey D. Luffy's Daniel Schlauch, respectively.

Rebecca Silverman of Anime News Network called Ranma the "least formed" character of the series as of the first two volumes of the manga. She wrote that "at first he feels badly about his affliction [and] how it affects others, but by the middle of the book he's started using it to his advantage, and really, it's hard to blame him there." and noted that Ranma clearly likes Akane much more than she likes him. Her colleague Theron Martin wrote that Ranma and Akane are "firmly anchored in the territory of clearly caring about each other even though they do not want to admit it." Todd Douglass Jr. of DVD Talk wrote that seeing their developing relationship is one of the initial hooks of the anime and is truly entertaining. The Fandom Post's Kory Cerjak called the "not-so-relationship" a constant form of entertainment due to "how they interact when they're hating each other and when they're being smitten." Commenting on how many people feel the ending of Ranma ½ does not resolve anything, Jason Thompson wrote that "expecting to see Ranma marry Akane is like expecting to see Uncle Scrooge marry Glitterin' Goldie or Archie marry Veronica [...] it just doesn't happen."

Martin called Venus Terzo's English performance as female Ranma a vast improvement over Brigitta Dau's and said it elevates the rest of the dub to an overall acceptable level. He wrote that the change was supposedly done due to fan complaints, which he called "entirely believable" given how "grating" Dau's performance is. Martin wrote that the English voice actor change from Sarah Strange as male Ranma to Richard Ian Cox takes some time to get used to due to how substantially it alters Ranma's voice and delivery.
