= List of Ranma ½ characters =

The Ranma ½ cast

The Ranma ½ manga series features a cast of characters created by Rumiko Takahashi. The story revolves around the Japanese teenage boy Ranma Saotome who has trained in martial arts since early childhood. As a result of an accident during a training journey in China, he is cursed to become a girl when splashed with cold water, while hot water changes him back into a boy. Throughout the series Ranma seeks out a way to rid his curse, while his friends, enemies and many fiancées constantly hinder and interfere.

Many of the characters are similarly cursed to turn into animals or other creatures when splashed and are skilled in different and unusual types of martial arts. The large cast's intricate relationships with one another, unusual characteristics, and eccentric personalities drive most of the stories. Although, the characters and their relationships are complicated, they rarely change once they are firmly introduced and settled into the series.

== Anything-Goes Martial Arts Dojo ==
=== Saotome family ===
==== Ranma Saotome ====
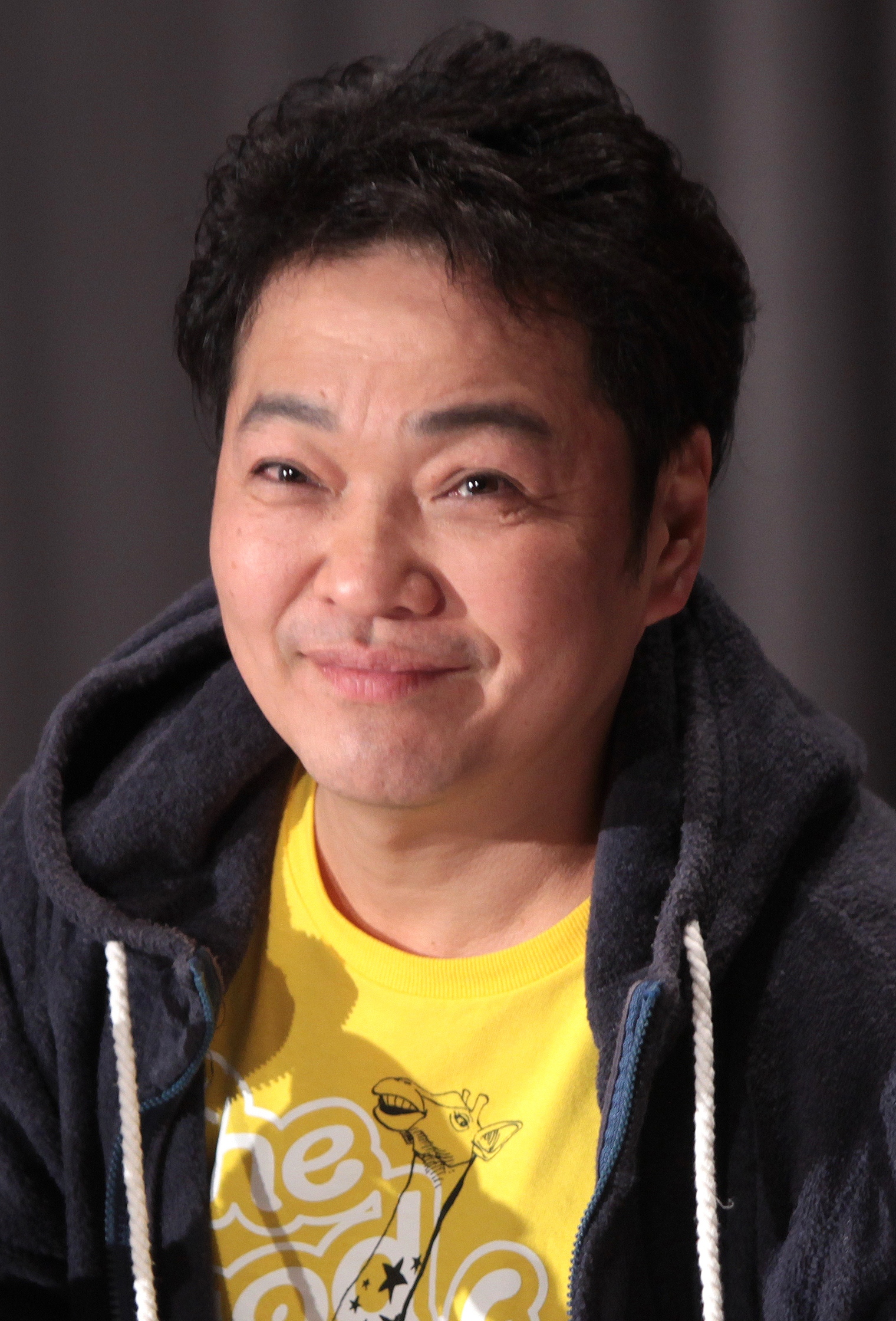
Kappei Yamaguchi provides the voice for the male half of Ranma Saotome in the anime.

Ranma Saotome (早乙女 乱馬, Saotome Ranma) is a 16-year-old martial artist who has spent most of his youth on training trips with his father. The last of these trips led them to Jusenkyo, China, where he fell into the Spring of Drowned Girl and changed into a well-built girl. Since then, he changes to this girl form any time he is doused with cold water, while hot water returns him to a boy. Thanks to an agreement between his father and Soun Tendo, he is engaged to Soun's daughter Akane. Due to a series of other involuntary entanglements, he has several additional love interests, most notably the Chinese Amazon Shampoo, okonomiyaki chef and childhood friend Ukyo Kuonji and Kodachi Kuno, the younger sister of rival Tatewaki Kuno. He is very much in love with Akane, but does not want to admit it. When another man shows general interest in her, he can't help but grow jealous leading him to becoming depressed, scheming something to separate them, or growing worried.

Martial arts is the 16-year-old hero's life. Whenever his pride is damaged, Ranma will go to great lengths to rectify the situation. He can come across as petty, arrogant and disrespectful, as he is prone to bragging and tossing insults. Despite these flaws, he retains a moral center throughout the series and has little to no problems helping those in need. Ranma also has an extreme fear of cats resulting from when his father trained him in the misconcepted 'Cat Fu' (猫拳, Neko Ken) technique. If he is isolated with a cat in a very small space, or when he can no longer cope with his fear of cats, he begins behaving like a cat himself and becomes a master of the 'Cat Fu' and only Akane can calm him down. He and Akane drift closer throughout the series, each going to great lengths to save the other when in trouble. The reason why Ranma tolerates his big number of suitors is not only because he is generally very friendly and caring towards them (going through great lengths to make sure Shampoo doesn't hate him, for example), but mainly because he considers himself a hunk. In spite of this, Ranma is the butt of most of the violence that happens in the story.

==== Genma Saotome ====
Voiced by: Kenichi Ogata (1989 series), Chō (2024 series) (Japanese); Robert O Smith (Viz Media dub), Dave Bridges (Animax Asia dub), Fred Tatasciore (2024 series) (English); Portrayed by: Arata Furuta

Genma Saotome (早乙女 玄馬, Saotome Genma) is Ranma's father and the master of the Anything Goes Martial Arts (無差別格闘早乙女流, Musabetsu Kakutō Saotome Ryū; "Indiscriminate Grappling Saotome Style"). He trained with Soun under Happosai. Because they were treated like slaves, they eventually sealed him within a cave and opened their own schools. Starting from a young age, Genma took Ranma on a continuous training trip to perfect his skills. So his wife Nodoka would agree to this plan, he promised to turn Ranma into a "man-among-men" under the threat of them both committing seppuku if he failed. He originally took Ranma to Jusenkyo because he had heard about it in a Chinese brochure even though he cannot read a word of Chinese. During their training there, Genma fell into a cursed spring, which gave him a giant panda curse. Unlike Ranma, he doesn't have much trouble with his curse, especially because he can get away from his problems in his panda form. He and Ranma eventually return to Japan to fulfill an arranged marriage between Ranma and Akane to keep the school going. He hides from his wife by staying as a panda while she is around, and she simply believes Ranko, Ranma's female form, has "Mr. Panda" as a pet.

Genma follows his own interpretation of the "Indiscriminate Grappling" code, which is not exactly all that virtuous itself to begin with. He frequently preaches duty and honor as a martial artist, but seems to be a poor example by which to set those standards. Though he himself claims to be a model martial artist, and makes a point of telling Ranma about the right thing to do, he is not above acting cowardly, stealing a dowry, or only looking out for his own well being. He usually tries to flee from any problems he has caused or is entangled in, foisting the matter on Ranma if he cannot. His love of food regularly overpowers his love of his son, once trading him for a bowl of ramen, and in another, he traded the infant Ranma for a meal of fish. He is very open with his panda form, and regularly uses it to avoid questions as pandas cannot speak. In panda form, he communicates by writing on wooden signs which he seems to pull out of a type of hammerspace in that form.

While he's usually either too lazy or scared to show it, Genma is an accomplished martial artist. He is extremely strong and agile despite his size, and his panda form increases his abilities even further, managing to give his son a run for his money in most of their serious battles or spars. Most of his special techniques are ridiculous to behold (but, amazingly enough, not completely useless), and he uses those quite often. However, he created a couple of "serious" schools: the Umisenken that allows him to hide his aura and execute ambush attacks from behind; and the Yamasenken that allows him to make opponents lose focus, create powerful vacuum-slice barrages, or strike deadly, piercing blows. These techniques having been found to be much more dangerous than he thought, he decided to seal them; he is revealed to have created the techniques to be able to survive in dire conditions by way of thieving. He usually resorts to grapple Ranma in the way he grapples a tire when he is a panda to sway him. Genma is also able to invoke a battle aura of epic proportions similar to Happosai's, but he can only use it for very brief periods (possibly just half a minute) before collapsing from overexertion, making it rather useless.

==== Nodoka Saotome ====
Voiced by: Masako Ikeda (Japanese); Lisa Bunting (Viz Media dub) (English)

Nodoka Saotome (早乙女 のどか, Saotome Nodoka) is Ranma's mother and Genma's wife. She has not seen them in over a decade though, when they left on their training trip. Stating that a doting mother would hinder Ranma's training, Genma made a contract with her to raise Ranma as a "man amongst men". If he failed, he and Ranma were to commit seppuku, a ritual suicide common among the samurai. She always has a katana with her for that purpose. Because Ranma's curse made him a woman half the time, they spent most of Nodoka's appearances hiding from her as Akane's cousin "Ranko" and her pet, Mr. Panda. Nodoka's heart was constantly broken by knowing that she wanted nothing more than to see her son again. She, in turn, is largely uninterested in Genma.

Near the end of the manga series, Nodoka finally discovered Ranma and Genma's dual identities and curses. She was more accepting than they had ever expected, mostly because she eventually began to suspect that Ranma and Ranko were, in fact, the same person. Once she learned the truth, she decided not to force them to commit seppuku so long as Ranma stayed interested in girls and continued to fight like a "man among men." She later moved in with them, allowing the three of them to be a "normal" family again.

=== Tendo family ===
==== Akane Tendo ====
Voiced by: Noriko Hidaka (Japanese); Myriam Sirois (Viz Media dub), Claudia Thomas (Animax Asia dub), Valeria Rodriguez (2024 series) (English); Portrayed by: Yui Aragaki

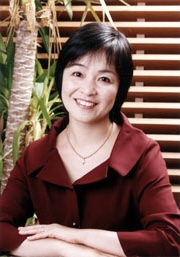
Noriko Hidaka provides the voice for Akane Tendo in the anime.

Akane Tendo (天道 あかね, Tendō Akane) is Soun's youngest daughter at age 16. She first encountered Ranma's male form as a naked stranger emerging from a hot bath in the bathroom, as she had up to that point only known him in girl form. Her family chose her to be engaged to him and carry on the Tendo family dojo. Due to numerous arguments and misunderstandings, their engagement was not off to a good start and both later mellow out. In spite of Ranma's apparent derision, Akane is actually often revered due to her beauty and strength. Early in the run, Akane had longer hair only to have it accidentally cut off during Ranma and Ryoga's fight. Akane wound up loving her new look and would subsequently keep her hair short for the rest of the series.

Akane regularly feels inferior to Kasumi in beauty and feminine pursuits, to Ranma and his other fiancées in cooking, martial arts ability or gymnastics, and to other students in swimming. She is trying hard to excel in everything, but is either clumsy or completely inept at all (especially cooking—the taste of her cooking can incapacitate most people for a significant amount of time) except for schoolwork and certain sports activities, like volleyball. She is also a capable martial artist, particularly excelling in the use of a wide variety of archaic weaponry, and is quite popular with the boys at school, though she would prefer a little less attention from them, especially Tatewaki Kuno. When someone, frequently Ranma, belittles her lack of success, or calls her uncute, ugly, over-muscled, unfeminine and tomboyish, she often feels upset and also gets very jealous when one of Ranma's other fiancées show physical affection towards him, although she will often state that she is not affected. She loves Ranma deep down, despite frequently refusing to show it.

Akane's personality usually swings from violent, hot-tempered, aloof, bad-mannered scorn towards her suitor to friendliness regarding other loved ones or just strangers in general.

In spite of her apparent disadvantages, out of the three fiancées, Akane is considered to have the best claim as a suitor for Ranma; this puts her as the main target for the rest of the fiancées.

==== Soun Tendo ====
Voiced by: Ryusuke Obayashi (1989 series), Akio Otsuka (2024 series) (Japanese); David Kaye (Viz Media dub), Russell Wait (Animax Asia dub), J. Michael Tatum (2024 series, season 1), Jude Gerard Prest (2024 series, season 2) (English); Portrayed by: Katsuhisa Namase

Soun Tendo (天道 早雲, Tendō Sōun) the head of the Tendo family, one of two that practices Anything Goes Martial Arts. He has a large house that is occasionally in need of repairs due to the fights that take place there. While he owns the Musabetsu Kakutō Ryū Tendo Dojo and is its current master, it has not been explicitly shown to have students, making the source of his income uncertain. Community representatives frequently approach him when they have problems with unusual phenomena, so this may provide some of it, and he has rented out the dojo for social meetings. He is shown to be quite careful with the expenses and gets upset when his daughter Nabiki spends his savings on expensive gifts, or when Ranma throws dinner on the floor. In spite of this, he is a very mindful and accommodating host at his dojo towards all sorts of visitors.

He studied under the founder of the style, Happosai, with Genma, who is a close friend. Their training was nothing short of abuse and slave labor, so they eventually managed to get away from him. He and Genma set up an arranged marriage between his daughter, Akane, and Ranma in order to unite the Tendo and Saotome Schools and continue its legacy. Despite protests from both parties, they believe the two will eventually grow to love each other. Soun is eager for his daughter to say she loves Ranma or vice versa. He'll start announcing wedding plans if Ranma and Akane seem romantically involved.

Soun is very emotional, often brought to tears just by thinking of a sad thought (though this tendency to cry is an anime-only trait). He is also a widower, left to single-handedly take care of his three daughters. He is very respectful to his deceased wife, whose grave he visits regularly, and he constantly mourns her. He's extremely protective of his three girls, especially Kasumi, and becomes sad if their affection is in doubt. Perhaps for this reason, he tends to become very angry whenever he suspects that Ranma is 'cheating' on Akane or otherwise is treating her badly, being intensely paranoid in this regard. He generally assumes that most incidents are Ranma's fault, and he often manifests himself as a ghostly, floating oni head to scare or intimidate Ranma in such a situation. In combat, Soun frequently fights clad fully in traditional samurai armor and he is skilled in both hand-to-hand combat and the use of a wide variety of archaic weaponry.

==== Nabiki Tendo ====
Voiced by: Minami Takayama (Japanese); Angela Costain (Viz Media dub), Saffron Henderson (Viz Media dub; singing), Elaine Wotten Costain (Viz Media dub), Candice Moore (Animax Asia dub), Stephanie Sheh (2024 series) (English); Portrayed by: Maki Nishiyama

Nabiki Tendo (天道 なびき, Tendō Nabiki) is Soun's middle daughter, age 17, and a sharp contrast to her older sister. She is a completely amoral businesswoman who loves money above all else and is willing to sacrifice anyone to gain more. She regularly turns very ruthless and manipulative for the cause of profit or entertainment. She is willing to stoop to considerable lows, and is completely at peace with being this way, being comparatively sane and balanced. She is recurrently used as a spoof of excessive materialism, with her extreme greed highlighted for comedic effect.

Nabiki tends to sell useful or nonworking items others have need of, and ships images of Ranma's girl form to admirers. Although a hedonist who generally takes a laid-back amused approach to the regular chaos, she has keen observation skills and a mean sense of humor. She is a flexible strategist, an expert actress who is capable of lying or faking sentiments without the slightest guilt, and is generally unflappable. She, however, does harbor a vague sympathy with Kuno (her classmate) as she affectionately calls him "Kuno-chan" ("Kuno Baby").

She has been stated to not possess any maidenly feelings, but she isn't above using her attractive appearance as a lure. In the "Bean-Gun Plant" story, Nabiki invested some of her earnings in stocks, but she is unwilling to spend her own money. She would rather steal Akane's wardrobe, get spoiled by an admirer, or empty Soun's savings to buy expensive items. She was briefly engaged to Ranma after Akane got frustrated with him, and rented him out as slave labour, but she also brought the two back together after Ranma seemed to demand too much effort.

Some of her more extreme acts include ruining her family to win a bet, blackmailing anybody with a crush on her for everything she can get, destroying Nodoka's house for entertainment, her sister's wedding for the chance of gifts, engineering the injury of a rival swindler while feigning affection, framing Ranma himself for attempted rape, despite him saving her life, or even casually selling female Ranma to a criminal casino. The only characters within the Dojo that don't seem to run any debts with her are Akane and Kasumi, though she sees her own efforts towards uniting Ranma and Akane as a tab that Ranma eventually has to pay.

==== Kasumi Tendo ====
Voiced by: Kikuko Inoue (Japanese); Willow Johnson (Viz Media dub), Andrea Kwan (Animax Asia dub), Laura Post (2024 series) (English); Portrayed by: Kyoko Hasegawa

Kasumi Tendo (天道 かすみ, Tendō Kasumi) is the eldest daughter of the Tendo family at age 19, and the most traditional in the Japanese sense, standing out as genial and pleasant compared to everyone else. She has graduated from high school and spends most of her day looking after the Tendo household, acting as the family's substitute "matriarch" by cooking, cleaning, and helping her family since her mother's untimely death. She has no interest in younger men, and Dr. Tofu Ono, the family physician, is deeply in love with her, though she has no idea about it. She just considers him to be a good friend and finds his antics amusing. Seemingly unaffected by the lunacy that is surrounding her, Kasumi is one of the few characters who never gets hurt at any point in the series, notwithstanding her temporary possession by a mischievous oni. She is also occasionally shown as wiser and more perceptive than readily apparent, and can see through Nabiki's schemes. Beyond taking care of the household, she has been shown to go out to meet friends and has borrowed a pressure point book from Dr. Tofu. She is also one of the only female characters who Happosai has never groped, though he has flirted with her.

=== Other Residents ===
==== Happosai ====
Voiced by: Ichiro Nagai (1989 series), Kazuhiko Inoue (2024 series) (Japanese); Paul Dobson (Viz Media dub), Victor Lee (Animax Asia dub), Frank Todaro (2024 series) (English)

Happosai (八宝斎, Happōsai) is the founder and grandmaster of the Musabetsu Kakutō Ryū (無差別格闘流; School of Indiscriminate Grappling). He often alternates between his role as a villainous grandmaster to one as a lighthearted pervert. As a hedonistic short, old man, he openly makes perverse activities his proud hobbies (much to the shame of his own disciples), committing indecencies willfully such as groping women, peeping at women bathing or undressing, and stealing lingerie (he is often found carrying a big sack of lingerie leaping from house to house). He goes into withdrawals if he is unable to participate in such activities, which causes him to almost die at one point. He attempts to model himself as a former ladykiller, but in reality, he was turned down by every woman in the Amazon village, including Cologne, during his youth. He is also sadistic and vengeful, with instances that include using his two students, Genma and Soun, as slaves and attempting to cripple Ranma for life by taking away his strength. Nevertheless, considering that both Soun and Genma have shown themselves to be powerful Martial Artists, have displayed abilities similar to Happosai, coupled with that their master returned to the Tendo Dojo to train either of them as an official heir to his school, this implies that Happosai did afford Soun and Genma at least some advanced training (though evidently nowhere near enough to outweigh all the injustices he dealt them).

Despite his small stature and age, Happosai is arguably, by far, the most powerful known martial artist in the entire series. Even without employing special techniques, he is able to effortlessly defeat Ranma, Ryoga, Genma and Soun combined within seconds, or overpower Taro's monster form with a single finger. His defining and most often employed weapons are cannonball-like fuse bombs, ranging from regular to small house-sized, which he can seemingly instantly conjure out of nowhere when needed. He possesses knowledge in ancient martial arts techniques, near-forgotten pressure points on a human body, recipes for alchemical concoctions with various effects, and knowledge of many Chinese and Japanese magical artifacts. Other techniques include turning his body substance similar to air for invisibility, chi-blasts, momentum negation or redirection, and crippling fear generation. He has an enormously powerful large skyscraper-sized battle-aura (looking like a giant version of himself), which allows him to increase the scale of his fighting to great kaiju proportions for prolonged periods of time, and pushes him far out of the league of virtually any other character. Ranma and his fellow fighters have wisely optioned to simply stay out of sight and run for their lives on the rare occasion when the grandmaster has been in this mode. His main weaknesses are that he is seldom remotely serious and he is susceptible to sucker-attacks while he is distracted by lingerie and women.

Happosai is shown to be a frequent foe to most of the cast, though he mostly plots against them if he feels that they have been disrespectful toward him (especially if they do not indulge him in his twisted needs). Even when he is shown to be not behaving maliciously, his actions and intervention always result in grave consequences. One example of this is Hinako Ninomiya (Ranma's teacher), whose life was saved by Happosai by teaching her a technique that allows her to absorb battle auras. She briefly becomes a foe to Ranma and his classmates as she is considered extremely dangerous before the two of them come to terms.

== Chinese Amazons ==
The Chinese Amazons are known in Japanese as the Joketsuzoku (女傑族): the name more accurately translates as Chinese Village of Woman Heroes (中国・女傑族（ニィチェズゥ）, Chūgoku Nyichezwu; pinyin: Nǚjiézú).

=== Shampoo ===
Voiced by: Rei Sakuma (Japanese); Cathy Weseluck (Viz Media dub), Candice Moore (Animax Asia dub), Grace Lu (2024 series) (English)

Shampoo (シャンプー, Shanpū; Chinese: 珊璞; pinyin: Shānpú) is the champion of the Chinese Amazon village. She came to Japan to kill the female Ranma, after he defeated her in an annual martial arts contest since he and Genma had hungrily devoured the prize, a well-stocked banquet table, while coming upon and watching the contest. Shampoo gave Ranma the "Kiss of Death", a promise to track 'her' down and eventually kill 'her'. Later, after male Ranma accidentally defeated her, she gave him the "Kiss of Marriage", since the laws of her village force her to kill any female defeaters and marry male ones. However, Ranma tricks her into believing he was the girl she was supposed to kill all along, breaking Shampoo's heart in the process.

As punishment for her failure to kill female Ranma or marry male Ranma, her great-grandmother Cologne brought her to Jusenkyo for retraining. During this training, she fell into the "Spring of Drowned Cat", making her cursed to turn into a cat, the one thing Ranma fears most, and she blames him for this status. Despite this, Shampoo's feelings for Ranma remain and she tries to win Ranma over through most of the series. Having returned to Nerima, Tokyo, she waits tables at the Cat Cafe (Nekō Hanten), her great-grandmother's restaurant. She also sometimes delivers ramen by bicycle, occasionally running down people—particularly Ranma—on the streets and rooftops. She is actively pursued by Mousse, a childhood friend for whom she generally shows nothing but disdain.

Shampoo speaks with a simplified mode of speech, most notably rapidly switching between ignoring and using personal pronouns, because of having a limited amount of time to learn the Japanese language. She is described as "innocent and aggressive", being very affectionate and cheerful, while simultaneously being devious and forceful. Her personal motto is "obstacle is for killing", and she is more than willing to assassinate any "obstacle" in the path of a goal or just for the sake of convenience. For instance she has attempted to brainwash Ranma into loving her. She is sometimes compared to Lum from Takahashi's earlier Urusei Yatsura due to the similarities in their character designs and openly clingy personalities. It is noteworthy that in the first Ranma ½ OVA, the sound effect used for Shampoo's jumping is the same as the iconic sound of Lum's flying.

She is considerably more insistent than any of Ranma's other fiancees, though her plans to woo Ranma are generally more violent and devious than his other suitors with the possible exception of Kodachi.

She is highly skilled in unarmed combat, possessing considerable speed and agility. Shampoo is strong enough to casually walk through reinforced stone walls on a regular basis; in the anime she says she does this because the door takes too long. She can also efficiently use certain supernatural acupressure techniques for instant unconsciousness, temporary mind-control, or even selective memory-removal. (In the manga, she appears to aggressively wash her adversaries hair for these effects, hence her name.) She uses a pair of "chúi" as her primary weapons.

Shampoo is constantly ogled by Mousse, her childhood friend and pretender, since Mousse is as clingy to Shampoo as Shampoo is to Ranma. She is generally unfazed and violent towards his affections because she has made Ranma her main priority; Shampoo is shown to have given Mousse various opportunities to woo her, though his clumsiness always gets the better of him. Mousse is generally shown to bear some maliciousness towards everyone except Shampoo (ironically this is because of Shampoo), though he is actually very polite, friendly and respectful.

Her bespectacled, and mustachioed father has only appeared occasionally as a background character, when watching her supposed training/punishment against Cologne at Jusenkyo, or working as a cook in the restaurant. However, he did appear as the final opponent of a 1990 video game, wherein he challenged Ranma due to the perceived bad treatment of his daughter.

=== Cologne ===
Voiced by: Miyoko Aso (1989 series), Ako Mayama (2024 series) (Japanese); Elan Ross Gibson (Viz Media dub), Kathleen Barr (Viz Media dub), Claudia Thomas (Animax Asia dub), Barbara Goodson (2024 series) (English)

Cologne (コロン, Koron; Chinese: 可崘; pinyin: Kě Lún) is the great-grandmother of Shampoo. She accompanies Shampoo on her return to Japan to see what this "future son-in-law" was made of, but she ended up staying so that she could aid Shampoo in winning Ranma's heart. She also opens the Cat Café in Nerima, where Shampoo and Mousse both work. She is a contemporary of Happosai, and well over three hundred years old, according to the anime. She calls Ranma "bride-groom" and "son-in-law" due to her attempts to have him marry Shampoo, just to watch him become enraged. Unlike the rest of the cast, Cologne seems to prefer to sit in the background and watch the madness unfold. If she has a motive, whether it is to help Shampoo in her efforts or to aid Ranma in his battles, only then will she step into the fray. She gets around by pogoing on a gnarled wooden staff that she sometimes uses as a weapon. Cologne is usually the voice of experience and knowledge to most of the cast, a contrast to the devious master Happosai (who exclusively serves as a constant foe).

She is a grand master of the Chinese Amazon martial arts, and occasionally teaches Ranma and his rivals new techniques, such as the Kachū Tenshin Amaguriken, Hiryū Shōten Ha and Bakusai Tenketsu. She is the only martial artist in the series whose skill rivals that of Happosai, enabling her to, for example, casually defeat either Ranma or Taro's chimaera form. In addition to Cologne's immense skill, she is able to manipulate water and ice, create whirlwinds by using an opponent's aura against them, shatter inanimate objects with a simple touch, fire chi-blasts, and touch pressure points to make a person feel like they are burning with even the slightest amount of heat. She is also knowledgeable in several other disciplines such as arcane lore, cooking, Chinese mythology, and magic artifacts.

=== Mousse ===
Voiced by: Toshihiko Seki (Japanese); Brad Swaile (Viz Media dub), SungWon Cho (2024 series) (English)

Mousse (ムース, Mūsu; Chinese: 沐絲; pinyin: Mùsī) is a male Chinese fighter, whose love for his childhood friend Shampoo has been unrequited. He has been in love with her for most of his life, but she finds him annoying at best, rebuking his advances ever since they were children. He comes to Nerima in search of this "new fiancé" that Shampoo has, and he stays to attempt to woo his sweetheart. He is extremely jealous of Ranma, who is the target of Shampoo's affection, and he believes he needs to defeat or kill Ranma in order to have her care for him. She states that she will reject him even in such a case, and often attacks him because of his obsessiveness. Despite his becoming a far more dangerous fighter than Shampoo, she almost never affords him any measure of respect, though when she does, Mousse's clumsiness gets the better of him. He works in the Cat Cafè (Nekō Hanten) with Shampoo and Cologne. Shampoo is well aware of Mousse's love for her, so she never actually sends him away or uses this to take advantage of him in her efforts to woo Ranma; this, however, doesn't prevent Mousse from engaging in combat with Ranma for her sake.

Mousse has extremely bad eyesight, which requires him to wear thick glasses, but he usually has them concealed within his robes or propped up on his forehead, leading him to sometimes mistake people and inanimate objects for other people. Due to his bad eyesight, he walked into a cursed spring, which turns him into a duck. Although Mousse's view is blurry without his glasses and below average even with them, he has apparently learned to compensate for it in combat, as this has not hindered him from maintaining high accuracy entirely without assistance.

Mousse is an amazingly skilled, swift, strong, and dangerous martial artist, who fights by using hidden weapons. His arsenal includes chains, blades, darts, iron balls, hidden knives, bombs, tear gas, and even yo-yos and various silly household appliances, manifesting quantities far beyond what he is realistically able to carry in his long sleeves and robe. He calls this ability "dark magic" simply because he is hiding objects in a dark place. He can also hide weapons in the feathers of his duck form and is able use them proficiently while flying. He is also extremely skilled in the unarmed Joketsuzoku style used by other Amazons. He is technically almost, but not quite in the same league as Ranma and Ryoga, apparently at least as strong as the former, and likely deadlier than either, though he has never managed to come out the victor in any confrontations with them, despite fighting unarmed combatants.

=== Pink and Link ===
Pink and Link are a pair of identical twin herbalist Amazons from the neighboring herbalist village to that of Shampoo, who once played a cruel prank on her, with the help of Mandragora seeds. Pink is shown to use poisons to attack people, which Link cures in turn; this causes people to mix them up. In their arc, Shampoo warns Ranma that she presented him to the local news at her village as husband and wife; this apparently would cause former rivals of Shampoo to attempt attacks against Ranma. Ranma is attacked while on the street by Pink, but cured by Link; not knowing that they are twins, Ranma lashes at Link, which causes her to run away from him. Later, they attack Shampoo's restaurant claiming that Shampoo attacked them under the very same circumstances, earning their enmity. Shampoo promptly kicks them out and reveals that she usually violently bullied the girls every time she came back to China, as payback and revenge to the initial prank, while claiming fully innocent victimization. Later, they attack Ranma at the Tendo Dojo and end up kidnapping Shampoo.

Ranma informs Cologne of the situation and she offers the mouthed sword Zhandudao and the shield Poduduan to fend the twins' attacks. The twins grow an enormous flower at the front of the restaurant and tie Shampoo from its pestles. Ranma climbs the flower and attacks the twins with a reluctant Poduduan, which turns out to be a single-use weapon. Link melts Zhandudao with her medicinal herbs. Shampoo wakes up and starts manipulating the twins to continue their plan as a ruse to lure Ranma. The twins manage to paralyze Ranma and Shampoo and fly away together on top of the detached petals of the flower. They land at Ranma and Akane's school, where a thick garden grows at the entrance. They imprison Ranma and Shampoo inside a poisonous vine cage.

Akane receives from Cologne a powerful fan named Fuo-Shenshan, the fire scepter Fuo-Yanshan, and a paper doll that can take on harm in the place of anyone, but can be used just once. She barges into the garden and confronts the twins, freeing Shampoo and Ranma. As Shampoo was still trying to lure Ranma, she turns against them and chases them with the twins. Ranma, Akane and Shampoo are trapped by some vine seeds planted by Link and knocked over. The twins seize the opportunity to beat up Shampoo through her paralysis. Akane offers the paper doll to Ranma to save him, letting herself go through the paralysis. Shampoo begins beating up the twins while still sleeping. Ranma finds them and they try to escape the garden, which is spewing poisonous gases; Ranma tries to use the fan and the scepter, but they backfire. Poisoned, the twins are able to concoct an antidote that they give to Ranma, severely burning his lips. With the four girls unconscious, Ranma feeds the scepter with the scalding medicine which makes it spew fire and he is able to gain enough impulse to escape the garden while carrying the four girls. Ranma is able to land safely with the unconscious girls, but as a result of the fall he breaks his legs. While recovering from his injuries, Ranma is visited by Shampoo, who informs him that the village newspaper is running a story by the twins that portrays him as a wimp. Nevertheless, Ranma angrily refuses to ever again getting involved with the twins.

== Kuno family ==
=== Tatewaki Kuno ===
Voiced by: Hirotaka Suzuoki (1989 series), Koji Tsujitani (episodes 65, 66, 68 & OVA 13), Tomokazu Sugita (2024 series) (Japanese); Ted Cole (Viz Media dub), Russell Wait (Animax Asia dub), Jonah Scott (2024 series) (English); Portrayed by: Kento Nagayama

Tatewaki Kuno (九能 帯刀, Kunō Tatewaki) is an upperclassman at Furinkan High School and the older brother of Kodachi Kuno. Hailing from a very wealthy family, he wields both his fortune and his bokken with equal ease. He has a large ego, creating the nickname "The Blue Thunder of Furinkan High", a moniker used by no one else, for himself. His ego is further apparent in that he is unable to conceive of Akane or female-form Ranma not being in love with him, and frequently assumes their actions are geared toward winning his affections. When speaking, he uses a regal tone (or Shakespearesque in the English version).

At the show's start, he has been madly in love with Akane for some time. After being defeated by Ranma in his female form, he also falls for the "Pigtailed Girl" as he calls "her". After briefly wrestling with his competing desires, Tatewaki decides he wants to be with them both and, in keeping with his ego, assumes that they are so in love with him that they will accept this. Tatewaki never realizes that the Pigtailed Girl is really his mortal enemy in a female body, despite witnessing Ranma's transformation several times—he merely believes that Ranma has switched places with her in some manner. He once hears her called by Ranma's name, and attempts to write it down for future reference. Despite this, he never makes a connection and continues to refer to "her" as his "goddess in pigtails", or "the pigtailed girl" for the entire series. Akane's sister Nabiki often sells him photographs of "the pigtailed girl" in various states of undress. He also has a strong rivalry with Kodachi, who similarly has a crush on male Ranma (and much like her brother refuses to believe that Ranma and the pigtailed girl are the same person), often leading to confrontations between the siblings. Unlike Kodachi, Tatewaki doesn't actually behave in any malicious way, and although he's a buffoon and extremely forward with the girls he likes, he is shown to be traditionally courteous.

As captain of the kendo team, Tatewaki was the school's most powerful warrior before Ranma's arrival. Despite constant defeats at Ranma's hands, he is always confident in his abilities, believing himself to be incapable of losing. Though he is initially no match for Ranma, after losing his memory for a time, he shows the potential to become far stronger. With his sword, he is very powerful, able to create "air pressure strikes" easily capable of destroying a stone pillar, and he later becomes able to spin rapidly, which creates a constant barrage of the strikes and makes his defense nearly impenetrable. The cheerleader Mariko Konjo has a rather large crush on him, and calls Kuno her "first love".

=== Kodachi Kuno ===
Voiced by: Saeko Shimazu (1989 series), Ayane Sakura (2024 series) (Japanese); Teryl Rothery (Viz Media dub; seasons 1–4), Erin Fitzgerald (Viz Media dub; season 5), Sylvia Zaradic (Viz Media dub; seasons 6–7), Candice Moore (Animax Asia dub), Allegra Clark (2024 series) (English)

Kodachi Kuno (九能 小太刀, Kunō Kodachi) is the captain of the gymnastics team of the St. Bacchus' School for Girls, who is referred to as "The Black Rose" (Kurobara no Kodachi), apparently due to her signature theatrical style of exiting a scene by leaving behind a swirling trail of black roses accompanied by high-octave laughter. She is an expert in Martial Arts Rhythmic Gymnastics, making her skilled in acrobatics and the use of balls, clubs, hoops, ribbons, and ropes as weapons. She is very agile, and she is not averse to using unorthodox methods in combat such as rigged weapons, explosives and various poisons. She attacks other people prior to competitions in order to win by default, which she calls "fighting in all fairness before the match." She becomes enamored with Ranma after he saved her from a fall, and attempts to make him hers at any cost. She also hates Ranma's female form, believing "her" to be a rival for Ranma, while her brother Tatewaki hates the male form, which is a frequent source of conflict between them. She is a good cook who prepares elaborate meals, and she often uses culinary expertise to her advantage by placing poisons, toxins, serums, and other strange substances in her victims' food to attain something she wants from them.

Kodachi is considered the most malicious of Ranma's suitors, and although she is shown in less occasions than Akane, Shampoo and Ukyo (in addition to being the only one not engaged to him), her personality and methods make her the most dangerous of the four. She is shown to have a skewed version of what would make Ranma happy; she is considered to be pursuing Ranma mostly out of personal vanity, as she does not show to be particularly interested in his happiness or well being.

=== Principal Kuno ===
Voiced by: Tatsuyuki Jinnai, Hōchū Ōtsuka (OVA 13) (Japanese); Scott McNeil (Viz Media dub) (English)

Principal Kuno (九能 校長, Kunō-kōchō) is the Kuno siblings' long lost father and the principal at Akane and Ranma's school. He is obsessed with Hawaiian culture, generally wears a lei and an aloha shirt, and speaks with a Hawaiian accent. His disappearance and subsequent return is explained in the manga as being part of a study trip to learn the teaching methods used in America. On his return from Hawaii, his first action is to attempt to force standard haircuts on all students (buzz cuts for boys, bowl cuts for girls), which begins a rivalry between the Principal and Ranma. He is gleefully devoted to making the lives of all the students at his school as miserable as possible and seems to enjoy their derision, though he likes to pick on Ranma in particular.

=== Sasuke Sarugakure ===
Voiced by: Shigeru Chiba (Japanese); Robert O Smith (Viz Media dub) (English)

Sasuke Sarugakure (猿隠 佐助, Sarugakure Sasuke) is the Kuno family's house ninja. Sasuke is a loyal servant and often tries to help Tatewaki defeat Ranma and steal Akane away from him. Despite his loyalty, Sasuke sometimes receives harsh treatment by Tatewaki. He has to live in poor conditions with minimal food and very little shelter or comforts.

Created exclusively for the 1989 anime, his character serves as a temporary substitute for Hikaru Gosunkugi throughout the Neko-Ken arc and several other early arcs.

== Other Japanese characters ==
=== Ryoga Hibiki ===
Voiced by: Koichi Yamadera (Japanese); Michael Donovan (Viz Media dub), Dave Bridges (Animax Asia dub), Damien Haas (2024 series), Rachel Slotky (P-Chan, 2024 series) (English)

Ryoga Hibiki (響 良牙, Hibiki Ryōga) is Ranma's long-time rival, and the only one the latter has stated to truly consider as such. He has no sense of direction and is always lost on long strenuous journeys—traits he inherited from his parents. This caused him to be four days late for a duel he and Ranma had planned to fight, and Ranma left on the third day. After spending months looking for male Ranma to have the belated duel, Ryoga finally ends up at Jusenkyo in China, but is pushed into a cursed spring by female Ranma (while chasing Genma and not looking where she was going). Ever since then Ryoga turns into a black piglet when doused with cold water, which makes his constant wanderings much more dangerous from hungry hunters and predators, and he initially carries a large grudge at Ranma for that once he learned the truth.

Ryoga is the first major challenge to Ranma in Nerima. Their first fight showcases their strengths, and it is a close match. Akane accidentally discovers Ryoga in cursed form, and not knowing the pig's true identity, adopts him as her pet and names him P-chan (Pちゃん). She is the first person to show him real kindness, and Ryoga falls head-over-heels in love with her, and consistently acts as a fierce protector from both real and imagined threats, whether in normal or cursed form. She even takes him to bed with her, and generally beats him severely with her sleep-movements.

Ryoga accepts training from Cologne because he feels that he can use it to best Ranma, and win Akane's interest. Cologne is equally using Ryoga, hoping to remove Akane from the picture, which would in turn free Ranma to wed Shampoo. She teaches him a technique, ostensibly to use against Ranma, for striking a boulder at precisely the right point to shatter it. Repeatedly being hit with a large boulder while attempting to master the technique makes Ryoga's body tremendously durable. He toughens even to the point that great impacts, such as being buried in a rockslide, or being repeatedly struck with large boulders, cause no visible damage. Engaging Ranma for a second time, he forces Ranma to also rely on training from Cologne, used in an inventive manner, to counter his newly toughened constitution while evading the technique. Only after the fight does she reveal that the technique does not work on people, and the only real advantage he gained is his durability.

When not upset Ryoga is usually shy, humble, helpful, and polite, especially around women. He tends to stock up on an assortments of gifts and local food specialties from the highly diverse locations where he ends up during his travels. Ryoga is also shown to have a chivalrous streak, and consistently protects any maidens in distress, or victims of bullies, monsters, or bandits that he comes across, and is sometimes emotional enough to be brought to tears from compassion, including for Ranma. However, he also recurrently tends to be led more by impulse and emotions than common sense, is prone to anger and misunderstandings, and, although he is generally more considerate and naive than Ranma and needs considerably stronger reasons to turn petty and spiteful, when sufficiently pressed, he has displayed a few more ruthless moments than his rival seems capable of. Ryoga is largely clumsy with his own strength when he is not engaging in combat, often going through walls and destroying property whenever he feels embarrassed. Ranma often takes advantage of Ryoga's good nature: Ryoga is utterly incapable of seeing through a lady in disguise (mostly Ranma), though this is not a unique trait in him, as Shampoo and Ukyo have also used (blatantly obvious) disguises on other people with success.

Ryoga's grudge towards Ranma for causing his second curse eventually disappears, and is replaced with a professional rivalry. This morphs into something of a mutual respect in the later story arcs, and Ryoga comes to save Ranma's and/or Akane's lives more times than the reverse. However, he remains annoyed with Ranma for recurrently arguing with Akane or manipulating him, and their mutual battle prowess competition will likely persist forever. In the late part of the manga series Ryoga's affection for Akane starts to shift towards the sumo-pig breeder Akari, who becomes his girlfriend.

Ryoga is one of the first characters to use Ki-projection as a means to combat Ranma. His ki attack is named the "Shi Shi Hokodan", or "Lion's Roar Shot", which in the anime is inconsistently displayed as either a green or red globe, alternately a beam, of energy. He taps into his reservoirs through the weight of feelings of depression, loneliness, frustration, pain, anger, hopelessness, and likely determination, to blasts an opponent with a vertical ray of pent up personal energy. Although Ranma does learn the same technique, his personality is much more suited to using emotions of confidence and arrogance, naming his own technique "Moko Takabisha". Ryoga further refines the technique, but the "Shin Shi Shi Hokodan" or complete form of the attack requires extreme levels of despair and projects Ki in a towering pillar, which then crashes down, pulverizing his opponent. Ryoga uses the final version of this technique while being strangled by Lime. His sorrow at the prospect of dying without being loved by Akane causes him to produce a powerful chi-attack that defeats Lime in a single strike, and causes the Musk dragon-prince Herb to wake up (due to the energy output) and feel awed by the display.

By the end of the series Ryoga spends his time wandering through the wilderness, attempting to find, and go on innocent dates with, his pig-breeding girlfriend, while striving to get over his old crush on Akane, and as usual, likely training and amassing new techniques to exceed Ranma—if he can ever find his friend and nemesis.

=== Ukyo Kuonji ===
Voiced by: Hiromi Tsuru (1989 series), Kaori Nazuka (2024 series) (Japanese); Kelly Sheridan (Viz Media dub), Candice Moore (Animax Asia dub) (English), Erica Mendez (2024 Netflix Series; English Dub)

Ukyo Kuonji (久遠寺 右京, Kuonji Ukyō) is an okonomiyaki chef and a childhood friend of Ranma. Ten years prior to the manga's beginning, she met Ranma during a training voyage to the country with Genma. Her father proposed an arranged marriage to Ranma, who was unaware that she was a girl, with his okonomiyaki cart acting as the dowry, to which Genma agreed. But when an oblivious Ranma said he liked okonomiyaki more than Ukyo, Genma stole the cart, breaking the engagement and leaving her behind. Shamed and ridiculed by her peers for not being feminine enough to keep her fiancé, she gave up her femininity and decided she wouldn't like boys. She dressed and lived as one, even attending an all-boys school at one point. During this time, she devoted herself to okonomiyaki-style martial arts to prepare to exact revenge on the Saotomes.

She later resurfaces at Ranma's school, and after a heated battle, he discovers her true gender. He calls her "cute", and she learns that he does not seem to get along with his "uncute" fiancée Akane. As a result, she reconciles with Ranma and attempts to reestablish their engagement. She calls him "Ran-chan" (occasionally dubbed as "Ranma-honey" in the English version), while he calls her "Ucchan". Ranma still treats her only as an old friend, but unlike those of his other suitors, her plots to win him over have been mostly non-violent and considerably more effective. Despite this, she can turn underhanded and occasionally ambushes those she believes to be her romantic rivals. In addition, she has been willing to give up her house and restaurant, or rescind her craft for Ranma's sake, if it would mean that they could be together.

Ukyo and Shampoo are shown as more bitter rivals than any of the two towards Akane, and are constantly at each other's throats. Though she is not above hurting Ranma either, she usually does it justifiably but not measuring her own strength. Unlike the other suitors, Ukyo is at better odds regarding Akane, as they are rivals but cautious friends; she has even lived at the Tendo Dojo for a while and is considered worthy of help from both Ranma and Akane at her okonomiyaki restaurant. Apart from Akane, Ukyo is the only alternative suitor to Ranma that goes to his same school and is also his classmate.

Ukyo's style of fighting is a legacy style from her father based on their food preparation, and reminiscent of ninja patterns. She uses food-based techniques to stun, restrain or confuse opponents, as well as a chi-infused "batter dragon", which fuses her techniques into one. She also uses a large spatula as a two handed weapon and has a bandolier of smaller spatulas she uses as projectiles. She is strong, swift, skilled, agile, and has a versatile range of attacks.

=== Hinako Ninomiya ===
Voiced by: Yumi Toma (Japanese); Janyse Jaud (Viz Media dub) (English)

Hinako Ninomiya (二ノ宮 ひな子, Ninomiya Hinako) is a teacher hired by Principal Kuno for the purpose of disciplining Furinkan High's many delinquent students, particularly Ranma. She has a reputation for being a very successful reformer, though her childlike body causes surprise. She was very sickly as a child. While she was in the hospital, Happosai rearranged her metabolism to allow her to absorb the auras of others to increase her health, though his reason for doing so was to allow him to escape enraged nurses, whose panties he had stolen, by having her absorb their auras. Her body ages much more slowly than other people due to the altered metabolism, so she still has the body of a child despite being an adult.

After absorbing a person's aura, her body becomes that of an adult, and she can then fire the energy back at her opponent, though she also returns to her actual form. The ability can be countered by pressing five specific pressure points, and it can be removed by doing so every day for a month, though the action makes the attacker look like a molester, as it forces them to grab her left breast, so Ranma gives up on the idea. While in her child form, she generally acts immature, and in her adult form, she acts as an elegant, somewhat vain adult woman, though either form always enjoys sweets, attractions, and video games, eats like a slob, and does not take care of her apartment.

Hinako is obsessed with enforcing discipline at Furinkan High, and she will do so at any moment if she feels someone is being a delinquent. Her primary target in this endeavor has been Ranma, whom she wishes to take care of so that everyone else will fall in line. Even so, her dedication to teaching also means she wants him to succeed in her classes, and has made an effort to help him with his studies. She is in love with Soun Tendo, and, despite his rejection, is always in pursuit to marry him.

=== Hikaru Gosunkugi ===
Voiced by: Issei Futamata (1989 series), Akira Ishida (2024 series) (Japanese); Michael Benyaer (Viz Media dub), Dave Bridges (Animax Asia dub), Stephen Fu (2024 series) (English); Portrayed by: Yuta Kanai

Hikaru Gosunkugi (五寸釘 光, Gosunkugi Hikaru) is an unpopular student in Akane and Ranma's class. He is desperately in love with Akane, and tries to get rid of Ranma by using extraordinary items, or his non-existent voodoo abilities. Gosunkugi uses the trappings of the ushi no toki mairi ritual—the candle crown, straw doll, hammer and nail—and in fact he is named after the gosun kugi (五寸釘; "five inch nails"). Due to the large strength gap between them, Ranma is largely oblivious of Gosunkugi's enmity towards him. Hikaru has a much larger part in the manga than in the anime, where he does not appear until the sixth season. The character of Sasuke Sarugakure, the Kuno family ninja, was invented to take most of the parts that Hikaru originally performed.

=== Tofu Ono ===
Voiced by: Yuji Mitsuya (1989 series), Toshiyuki Morikawa (2024 series) (Japanese); Ian James Corlett (Viz Media dub; seasons 1–5), Kirby Morrow (Viz Media dub; seasons 6–7), Josh Keaton (2024 series) (English); Portrayed by: Shosuke Tanihara

Dr. Tofu Ono (小乃 東風, Ono Tōfū) is a chiropractor who runs a moxibustion and acupuncture clinic in Nerima. His office is located near the Tendo dojo. He has known their family for a long time. In addition to his medical skills, he is very knowledgeable about martial arts techniques. He uses his knowledge of pressure points and other medicine to help Ranma and the others. He is hopelessly in love with Kasumi. Whenever he sees her, his glasses fog up and he becomes nervous, losing the ability to focus on what he is doing, which can prove dangerous for any patient he may be treating at the moment. Kasumi is completely oblivious to the effect she has on him, dismissing any of his unusual actions, presumably because she has never seen him act differently. In a similar manner, Dr. Tofu was unaware of the crush Akane had on him at the series' beginning; he was the reason she grew her hair long. She gave up on him after her hair was cut short in a freak accident. For a time, he employed both Genma and Shampoo as assistants. He all but disappeared from the cast after the moxibustion manga arc. In the live-action special, Dr. Tofu is portrayed by Shōsuke Tanihara, he works primarily as the Furinkan High School nurse and also serves as a late-night security guard.

=== Konatsu ===
Konatsu (小夏) is a male ninja raised as a female kunoichi, and in this respect is described as a genius that is born only once every one hundred years. He was raised by his cruel stepmother and stepsisters, who treated him like a slave after the death of his father. Like Ukyo's other suitor Tsubasa Kurenai, his face and body appear feminine when fully clothed. He generally wears female battle attire and casual clothing, speaks and acts like humble and subservient Japanese woman, and is generally quite shy. He has feelings for Ukyo Kuonji, though they go unanswered. He is happy to dress in male clothing to help attract customers to her restaurant, though the outfits are generally overly decorated.

He uses trickery and traps in battle, and often utilizes shuriken, smoke bombs, in his hands lethal (cheap) paper swords, a whirlwind of paper bills, and the "Duplicating Body Technique", which allows him to create up to four doubles, though he has not used it in battle. When Konatsu is fighting full force he is more than Ranma can handle while holding back in the no-damage manner used to incapacitate most female fighters, but he does not appear to be as formidable as Ranma, Ryoga, Ryu, or Mousse when they are trying hard.

=== Akari Unryu ===
Akari Unryu (雲竜 あかり, Unryū Akari) comes from a long line of trainers who raise and train pigs for sumo-type fighting. Akari loves pigs, and their potential strength as warriors. Her favorite, Katsunishiki, is one of the best in the country and her grandfather states that only someone who can defeat it in battle is worthy to marry Akari. Ryoga defeats it, which causes Akari to fall in love with him, and she falls for him even more after finding out that his curse transforms him into a small pig. Due to a misunderstanding, she once attempts to learn to hate pigs to appease him, but she is unable to do so. She understands his poor sense of direction and provides him with a map to his destination before their dates.

=== Tsubasa Kurenai ===
Voiced by: Eiko Yamada (1989 series), Minami Tanaka (2024 series) (Japanese); Saffron Henderson (Viz Media dub) (English)

Tsubasa Kurenai (紅 つばさ, Kurenai Tsubasa) is a master of disguise, often dressing up as various inanimate objects or plants. He also constantly dresses up like a girl and has a girlish (but obnoxious) personality to match, which causes confusion to anyone he meets. He has been in love with Ukyo Kuonji since they went to school together, and is thus jealous of Ranma, who he believes to have stolen Ukyo. He later attempts to date Ranma's female form, but Ranma, thinking Tsubasa to be female, attempts to set him up with his male form because he feels sorry for Tsubasa. Ranma eventually learns that Tsubasa is a male, which leads to violence. Tsubasa is not a trained martial artist, but he has proven to possess strength ample enough to roughhouse Ranma, and he can still cause trouble with his ridiculous tactics and unpredictability. He most commonly disguises himself as a mailbox, but also often poses as Ucchan's Okonomiyaki sign (in order to watch Ukyo), a tree, a trash can, a barrel, and various other objects.

=== The Golden Pair ===
Azusa Shiratori voiced by: Naoko Matsui (1989 series), Aoi Yūki (2024 series) (Japanese); Cathy Weseluck (English; Viz Media dub) Kayli Mills (2024 series)

Is the female half of "The Golden Pair" of Kolhotz Highschool. She is famous for her obsession with gathering anything she finds adorable and giving them French inspired names.

Mikado Sanzenin voiced by: Kazuhiko Inoue (1989 series), Mamoru Miyano (2024 series) (Japanese); Ian James Corlett (English; Viz Media dub) Marin Miller (2024 series)

Azusa Shiratori (白鳥 あずさ, Shiratori Azusa) and Mikado Sanzenin (三千院 帝, Sanzenin Mikado) are a pair of martial-arts-ice-skaters known as The Golden Pair. Azusa is bratty and compulsively kleptomaniac. Often, when she finds cute things, she gives them equally cute names and takes them home, even if they clearly do not belong to her. She meets any person attempting to stop her from doing so with violence. Mikado, her partner and classic playboy, in particular is often the target of her assaults with blunt objects.

Azusa comes into conflict with Akane by apprehending the latter's pet piglet P-chan, and renaming it to "Charlotte". When Akane wants it back, Azusa challenges her to a match to determine the rightful owner. Mikado earns a corresponding challenge from Ranma by trying to steal a kiss from Akane's lips, and later earns his full fury, by kissing Ranma's female form. Despite Ranma's lack of skating skill, Mikado is narrowly bested in personal combat during a fight on skates. The official showdown, called the Charlotte Cup, turns into a long, hard, three-way battle between The Golden Pair and their frequently distracted and shifting opponents Ranma, Akane and Ryoga.

In the manga, they only appear once, but they have a cameo appearance in the first movie. And Azusa has an additional appearance in an episode of the TV series. There she takes Tatewaki and Sasuke as two of her cute playthings.

=== Ryu Kumon ===
Voiced by: Mitsuru Miyamoto

Ryu Kumon (公紋 竜, Kumon Ryu) is a wandering martial artist and master of the Yamasenken. When he was 6 years old, he and his father were a very poor family that owned the shoddy Kumon Dojo. One day Ryu's father had an encounter with Genma Saotome. After Genma found out about the Kumons' financial problems, he gave Ryu's father a scroll containing the techniques of the deadly secret art of Yamasenken, a.k.a. Fist of One Thousand Mountains. This led Ryu's father to believe he could use the Yamasenken to restore his dojo, but when he practiced its attacks indoors he ended up destroying the building, causing it to fall on top of him which led to his death. With his last moments of life, he gave Ryu the scroll and told him to find the scroll containing the companion Umisenken. Since then Ryu has traveled alone without any family or friends part of which has led to his harsh and unscrupulous nature.

Ten years later, he comes across Genma's wife Nodoka, when saving her from a rampaging bear, she tells him that he is her long lost son, Ranma, since the scroll he is carrying has Ranma's name written on it. While somewhat surprised by his coincidental good fortune in encountering the wife of Genma, Ryu immediately takes the opportunity to play along, in order to find the Umisenken scroll, and takes up residence within her house. Ranma discovers that Ryu is misleading his mother, and after being beaten and threatened to be exposed if he interfered, decides to learn the stealthy Umisenken technique from his father, which is developed as a direct counter to the brutal and powerful Yamasenken. Once Ranma mastered the Umisenken, he finally managed to defeat Ryu after a harsh and difficult battle.

=== Shinnosuke ===
Voiced by: Takeshi Kusao (Japanese); Jason Gray-Stanford (Viz Media dub) (English)

Shinnosuke (真之介, Shinnosuke) and his grandfather both live in the forest of Ryugenzawa, where they protect the local villagers from the giant animals that they once kept as pets. Years ago when Akane was vacationing with her family in Ryugenzawa, she got lost in the forest and was attacked by a giant platypus. However she was saved by Shinnosuke. Some time later, when Shinnosuke was near death after being scratched by the platypus's venomous claws, his grandfather took some of the Water of Life and fed it to Shinnosuke. Shinnosuke survived, but developed a dependency on the Water of Life.

Years later, in the present, Akane once again hears about the forest of Ryugenzawa in a television advertisement asking for help in combating the increasing numbers of monsters and remembers Shinnosuke saving her. In an attempt to pay back Shinnosuke, Akane travels to Ryugenzawa to find him. In the process, Akane is attacked by a giant creature, and is saved, just like when she was young, by Shinnosuke, who still bears the marks on his back. Although he is now very forgetful, Shinnosuke invites Akane to stay with him and his grandfather. Akane later cures Shinnosuke of his dependency on the water of life by applying a special moss to his back. He later develops a crush on Akane.

=== Mariko Konjo ===
Voiced by: Yuko Kobayashi (Japanese); Jocelyn Loewen (Viz Media dub) (English)

Mariko Konjo (今条 マリ子, Konjō Mariko) is a minor antagonist who serves as the captain of the Seisyun High School cheerleading team. They assault opposing teams by throwing their cheerleading materials. She instantly develops feelings for Kuno after he lands on her, and she believes that female Ranma is trying to steal him away. She often speaks in rhymes or spells out words in normal conversation. Mariko enthusiastically uses "Martial Arts Cheerleading", an unscrupulous tactic meant to injure other teams, and make her team invincible.

Like several other characters virtually everything Mariko does is a gag or parody, in her case with Valley Girl speak and cheerleading motifs. She creates various displays with the theme of "love" in the name, such as Love Confession Pom-Pom Fireworks, Love Boomerang, and Innocent Girl Love Letter Blast, but also has surprisingly efficient oddball special attacks and fighting-skills.

She uses her cheerleading tools to attack opponents, such as using batons as bludgeons, or throwing them with incredible stealth and accuracy, to knock out an opposing team without notice, whether directly or through ricochets. She also has a version that can extend to many times its original length. Other attacks include multiple shredding "razor-pom-poms", and strong (miniskirt-wearing) flying kicks. She proved to be a stronger opponent than either Shampoo or Ukyo, and actually managed to momentarily defeat Ranma with an unexpected staff strike to the jugular.

=== Characters originally from the second anime ===
==== Ichirō ====
Voiced by: Tomokazu Seki (Japanese); Andrew Frankel (English)

A member of the broadcasting club at Furinkan High School—known for his live game commentary, and said to be nicknamed the "word magician"

==== Ranma's best friends ====
Noriko voiced by: Misako Tomioka 冨岡 美沙子 (Japanese); Laura Post (English)
Tomoyo voiced by: Ayaka Kamimoto 神本 綾華 (Japanese); Abbey Veffer (season 1), Emi Lo (season 2) (English)
Hiroko voiced by: Natsumi Ōshita 大下 菜摘 (Japanese)
Shingo voiced by: Shō Okumura 奥村 翔 (Japanese); John Patneaude (English)
Kīchi voiced by: Yōhei Hamada 浜田 洋平 (Japanese); JP Karliak (English)

Noriko (のりこ), Tomoyo (ともよ), and Hiroko (ひろこ) are friends with Akane. Shingo (しんご), and Kīchi (きいち) are friends with Ranma.

== Other Chinese characters ==
=== Pantyhose Taro ===
Voiced by: Shinnosuke Furumoto (Japanese); Matt Hill (Viz Media dub) (English)

Pantyhose Taro (パンスト太郎, Pansuto-Tarō) is a young martial artist, depicted as an antagonist, who is born in Jusenkyo. Happosai helps his mother with the birth, and accidentally bathes him in the most accursed spring in the area, and because of the customs of the village, Happosai also names him. His cursed form is a chimera resembling either a stereotypical demon or minotaur, with small crane wings which allow him to fly great distances despite his enormous size, and an eel sticking out of his lower back which works as a second set of eyes for Taro during combat. He later integrates an octopus curse to gain a set of tentacles, as well as an ink-blast, which he uses to constrict or confuse his enemies. While others hate their cursed forms, he takes pride in the form's strength and durability in battle, which both considerably exceed that of Ranma himself. However, Taro intensely despises and feels ashamed of his name, wishing to take the name "Awesome Taro", or something similarly impressive-sounding, but the only way to change it by local custom is to have Happosai agree, although he refuses unless it is something other lingerie-related.

Taro is highly ruthless and power-hungry. He's generally dishonorable and often cheats and betrays during confrontations, but will help beautiful women who are in trouble. He's not used to being helped, and generally gives disdainful remarks as thanks for offered aid. Taro is especially intolerant of Ranma, whom he hates because Ranma calls him "Pantyhose-guy", and tends to respond with "cowardly okama", "crossdressing/transgender freak", or similar derogatory epithets. Perhaps to remind himself of the shame his moniker brings, he wears a pair of pantyhose around his waist like a belt. He has also stated a goal to "take over the world", but seems very clueless in this endeavor.

In human form Taro had a certain disadvantage to Ranma during their first confrontation, but his similar tendency to provoke and fight dirty enabled him to gain an edge during their second fight. However, he has not displayed any repertoire of special techniques, has recently been more interested in finding ways to enhance his cursed form than training to increase his skill, and does not appear to be as cunning as a chimera.

=== Jusenkyo Guide ===
Voiced by: Kōichi Yamadera (Japanese); Ian James Corlett (Viz Media dub; seasons 1–5), Michael Donovan (Viz Media dub; seasons 6–7), Kaiji Tang (2024 series) (English)

The Jusenkyo Guide is a tourist guide at the training ground of cursed springs at Jusenkyo. He usually warns anyone that comes there that they should not train there or they will fall under a grave curse but never actually interferes with their decisions. He has an encyclopedic knowledge of the hundreds of pools throughout the area, knowing their names, when they became cursed, and the "tragic story" behind each of them. He is also in charge of the guest registry that Pantyhose Taro later uses to track down all the victims of the Jusenkyo curses. He is often helpful to anyone who visits and tries to offer whatever help he can. Unfortunately, he is not very efficacious, and usually informs the unfortunate cursed victim too late about the curse that has fallen on them. Despite his efforts, nearly every character who comes to the springs ends up cursed. The Guide is also an expert on the local area, being knowledgeable about the Chinese Amazons and their customs. The Guide has a young daughter named Plum. He also mentioned having a wife, but she is never seen.

=== Plum ===
Plum is the daughter of the Jusenkyo Guide, who appears in the final arc of the manga. When Saffron's people capture her father and start strangling the flow of the Jusenkyo springs, she travels to Japan to warn Ranma, Ryoga, Genma, Shampoo, Mousse and Cologne, and later guides them in the trip to Jusenkyo. Even though Plum is only a little girl, she is fairly intelligent, reasonable and brave, providing Ranma and his friends with useful information about the springs and following them even in dangerous situations.

=== Rouge ===
Rouge is a girl from Shanghai, China, who holds a grudge against Pantyhose Taro for stealing the "source of her power." She is presented as generally "overfeminine", being vain, shy, melodramatic, sensitive to the point of easily fainting when mentally exhausted, and fond of superstitions, such as astrology and blood groups. However, she is also violently vengeful when upset, and mostly disregards any damage she causes as a "bad omen".

She is able to transform into an Asura, which grants her six arms, three faces with independent minds, and great strength. In this state her personality is rather turned "overmasculine", loving to eat, fight, blow things up, and apparently possessing few other interests.

The "Asura" form can create lightning storms, or small flaming rocks from her hands, sheathe her body in protective fire, and manifest a turbulent revolving inferno (literal "fire storm"), as well as emit a blinding flash of light. She is susceptible to physical attacks, and her mind is split in three parts that recurrently have different ideas of what to do, but her tendency to hover far away and attack from a distance makes her a difficult opponent. She later learns that her "power sources" are actually magnetic disks used to prevent stiffening in one's back, which is a problem for her cursed form. Rouge does not appear in the anime.

=== Herb ===
Voiced by: Katsuaki Arima

Herb (ハーブ, Hābu) is a member of the Musk Dynasty, an ancient community of Chinese martial arts devoted to transforming animals into humans using a cursed spring and breeding with them in order to produce heirs with bolstered genetic fighting potential. Herb is part of the royal line, which is descended from dragons, granting him chi-mastery. He is raised without female contact, as is every other male, and before being married, he attempts to use a spring to familiarize himself with women by transforming a monkey. Distracted by breasts, he accidentally falls into the spring and becomes trapped in a female form. He and his two servants, Mint and Lime, attempt to find an artifact to reverse the effect. Herb is ruthless and irate, showing little respect for the worth of anyone beyond himself. Due to his experience with the monkey that cursed him, Herb possesses an irrational hatred towards female breasts, and he is easily distracted and enraged by the sight of them.

Herb is an immensely skilled martial artist, who has consistently outmatched Ranma in direct combat. He believes himself to be a complete master of manipulating chi, though he is easily surprised by unknown attacks. He has the ability to fly, use supersonic strikes, multiple flexible chi blasts, a sword made from chi, and flying blades of chi, as well as the Amazon Hiryu Shoten Ha technique, which uses the power of an opponent to fuel a tornado.

Herb's two main, fearsome and ruthless, but naive and inexperienced, bodyguards are named Lime and Mint. Lime is of the tiger-clan, a massive master warrior dressed in animal skins, and the physically strongest and most durable character in the series, dwarfing even Ryoga in these areas, with an upper maximum of over 100,000 tonnes. Mint looks like a short young man, but is part wolf, wears the skin of one over his head, is a master swordsman, and the swiftest character in the series, more than a match for Mousse even when the latter goes all out, and utilises a limited number of throwing knives, but is easily distracted. However, although physically superior to Herb they have not displayed any special techniques.

=== Saffron ===
Saffron is a humanoid phoenix, ruling over a tribe of bird-human hybrids transformed from the waters of the cursed springs. He is the main foe of the final arc of the manga. He attempts to use the waters to become an adult and provide heat and light for his people, but the process strangles the flow of the springs, which means that others cursed by the springs have no means to cure themselves. He is selfish and territorial, and only cares for his own people. He tends to be cold and condescending even towards those who treat him with kindness and loyalty.

Saffron has mastery over fire, allowing him to use a number of attacks related to it, up to a gigantic fireball capable of vaporising several mountaintops in its path, making it the most powerful attack in the series. Saffron is able to fly, and is skilled with the Kinjakan, an ancient weapon of his people. He can rapidly heal missing limbs, and he is reborn as an infant after violent deaths, but can be beaten unconscious by severe blunt impacts, and his physical defenses are very low due to being pampered since birth.

Saffron's main servants, beyond his chamberlain, are Kiima, Koruma, and Masala (like himself given pun names sounding identical to spices or spicy dishes, similar to the Musk being named after herbs, and other rural Chinese from female beauty accessories).

Kiima is part seabird, the loyal, crafty, proud, haughty, and petty captain of his guard, as well as an expert swordswoman, spy, and seductress. She is capable of flight; using an extremely lethal, mystically enforced metal-slicing, multiple "razor-feather" discharge; communicating with birds or commanding large throngs to perform complex tasks across continents, such as information-gathering, retrievals, or abductions; using surikomi/imprinting eggs to ambush, brainwash, and enslave opponents to turn on their own; or various Jusenkyo water to transform into female human disguises (her latest being a copy of Akane Tendo). Her weaknesses are that she has limited unarmed combat skills, turns human from cold water, and cannot fly in times of rain. Shampoo intensely hates her due to the humiliation of enslavement, and is shown subduing Kiima in combat while Ranma fights Saffron.

Koruma and Masala are Kiima's loyal, dedicated, and easily impressed part crow young bodyguards and handymen. They are stronger and apparently much more dangerous hand-to-hand fighters than herself, are similarly capable of flight as long as they avoid cold water, and can use weaker versions of her feather attack, but are easily confused and dependent on her guidance. Kiima enjoys keeping them around for flattery.

=== Maomolin ===
Voiced by: Masahiro Anzai (Japanese); Samuel Vincent Khouth (Viz Media dub) (English)

Maomolin (マオモーリン, Maomōrin) is a 3000 year old ghost cat who always searches for a wife.

== Reception ==
Writing for Anime News Network (ANN), Bamboo Dong compliments Takahashi's character designs as being "easily recognizable", but laments that "everyone looks largely the same", with polar facial expressions and eyebrows, which "seem to always be in a state of unnatural anguish", while "the different age groups are lumped under the same stature and facial types." Also writing for ANN, Carlo Santos disagrees, praising the series' "iconic character designs" for their "great facial expressions" and "distinctive features", which "always make it easy to tell who's who". In an interview with Justin Sevakis for ANN, Anna Exter, a professional anime translator, said that, when she was first introduced to anime, she found the series' characters were "absolutely the cutest things" that she "had ever seen". Writing for THEM Anime Reviews, Raphael See praises the cast of the anime series' first season, saying that they are both "hilarious" and "cute" and that they "help make the series more than just another teenage sitcom".
