= Outta Control =

Outta Control may refer to:

== Music ==
- Outta Control (group), a 1990s Canadian house music group

=== Albums ===
- Outta Control, a 1999 album by LMT Connection
- Outta Control, a 1994 album by Michael Peace
- Outta Control, a 1995 EP by the Delinquents
- Outta Control, a 2005 EP by Static Thought

=== Songs ===
- "Outta Control" (50 Cent song), 2005
- "Outta Control" (Baby Bash song), 2009
- "Outta Control", a song by Edgar Winter from Jasmine Nightdreams
- "Outta Control", a song by J786
- "Outta Control", a song by Peter Andre from Revelation
- "Outta Control", a song by Peter Pan Speedrock from Spread Eagle
- "Outta Control", a song by Sloppy Meateaters from Shameless Self-Promotion
- "Outta Control", a song by Styles of Beyond from Megadef
- "Outta Control", a song by Sword from Metalized
- "She's So (Outta Control)", a song by M-Flo from Square One

== Other uses ==
- Nickelodeon: Outta Control, a former attraction at Alton Towers theme park, Staffordshire, England
- Ranma ½: Outta Control, season 4 of the anime series Ranma ½

== See also ==
- Out of Control (disambiguation)
