= Ranma ½ season 3 =

Ranma ½
- Season 3
- Cover of the DVD box set by Viz.
- No. of episodes: 23

Release
- Original network: Fuji TV
- Original release: April 20 – September 21, 1990

Season chronology
- ← Previous; Season 2 Next → Season 4

This article lists the episodes and short summaries of the 23rd to 45th and 51st episodes of the Ranma ½ Nettōhen (らんま 1/2 熱闘編) anime series, known in the English dub as the third season of Ranma ½ or "Hard Battle".

Rumiko Takahashi's manga series Ranma ½ was adapted into two anime series: Ranma ½ which ran on Fuji TV for 18 episodes and Ranma ½ Nettōhen which ran for 143. The first TV series was canceled due to low ratings in September 1989, but was then brought back in December as the much more popular and much longer-running Ranma ½ Nettōhen.

Viz Media licensed both anime for English dubs and labeled them as one. They released them in North America in seven DVD collections they call "seasons". Nettōhen episodes 23 to 45 and 51 are season 2, which was given the title "Hard Battle". Episode 51 was inserted as episode 63 in this season, while 46 to 50 are in season 4.

Episode 23's opening theme is introductory piece "Ranma You Pervert" and its closing is "Don't Mind China Boy" (ド·ン·マ·イ来々少年, Don Mai Rairai Boi) by Etsuko Nishio. The next opening theme song is "Full of Memories" (思い出がいっぱい, Omoide ga Ippai) by CoCo. The closing theme from 24 to 38 is "Lambada Ranma" (乱馬ダ☆RANMA, Ranbada Ranma) by the "Ranma ½ Choral Ensemble", composed of the anime's original voice actors. The third closing theme is "Present" (プレゼント, Purezento) by Tokyo Shōnen; though it was never used in the English dub.

== Episode list ==
No. overall	No. in season	Title	Original release date
23	1	"Ranma Gains Yet Another Suitor"; Transliteration: "Mata Hitori Ranma wo Aishita Yatsu" (Japanese: また一人乱馬を愛したヤツ)	April 20, 1990
A mysterious chef named Ukyo Kuonji comes to town to challenge Ranma Saotome, and it seems that they know each other. One thing is certain, however, and that is that Ukyo is holding a grudge against Ranma and is going all-out to exact revenge.
24	2	"Ryoga & Akane: 2-Gether, 4-Ever"; Transliteration: "Netsuai? Ryōga to Akane" (Japanese: 熱愛?良牙とあかね)	April 27, 1990
Ranma was promised to her, so Ukyo just needs to get rid of his current bride-to-be. To do this, Ukyo teams up with the hapless Ryoga Hibiki, with the intent on fixing him up with Akane Tendo.
25	3	"Sneeze Me, Squeeze Me, Please Me! Shampoo's Recipe For Disaster"; Transliteration: "Kushami Ippatsu Aishite Naito" (Japanese: くしゃみ一発愛してナイト)	May 4, 1990
Desperate to make Ranma hug her, Shampoo makes special dim sum for him with a mushroom that causes whoever swallows it to obey a command whenever a certain signal is given. Shampoo means to make that signal a snap, but a cat sneezes first. Now, Ranma will hug anyone who sneezes near him. To make matters worse, Akane is coming down with the common cold.
26	4	"Rub-a-Dub-Dub! There's a Pervert in the Tub"; Transliteration: "Maboroshi no Happōdaikarin wo Sagase" (Japanese: 幻の八宝大華輪を探せ)	May 11, 1990
Happosai wants to tag along when Akane and her friends make plans to go to a hot spring. However, Ranma, Genma Saotome, and Soun Tendo spoil his plans. He ragingly decides to use his ultimate technique on them, thought he has forgotten how to perform it, needing to acquire a special scroll that has the instructions. It is later found out that the technique was the use of firecrackers.
27	5	"I Love You! My Dear, Dear Ukyo"; Transliteration: "Daisuki! Watashi no Ucchan" (Japanese: 大好き!私のうっちゃん)	May 18, 1990
Tsubasa Kurenai arrives in Tokyo to take Ukyo back from Ranma. Ranma, who thinks Tsubasa is a girl, becomes puzzled as his charms as a girl do not work on other girls when competing against Tsubasa. He later finds out that Tsubasa is really a male cross-dresser.
28	6	"The Witch Who Loved Me: A Japanese Ghost Story"; Transliteration: "Majo ga Aishita Shitagi Dorobō" (Japanese: 魔女が愛した下着ドロボー)	May 25, 1990
Soun is elected as the chairman of the town council. To his dismay, his first task is to stop the multiple lingerie raids by an unknown thief, which is Happosai in this case. Happosai later finds out about the ancient cursed bra of Yang Guifei, which Soun is told to protect.
29	7	"Transform! Akane the Super-Duper Girl"; Transliteration: "Henshin! Mukimuki-man Akane" (Japanese: 変身!ムキムキマンあかね)	June 1, 1990
Akane accidentally eats the "super Soba noodles" made by Happosai, which is made to give anyone who eats it super strength. Begrudged by her defeat of Shampoo in an arm-wrestling contest earlier, Akane seeks to even the score. Ranma later finds out that the Soba had side-effects of giving the consumer whiskers, and tries to get Akane to eat the antidote.
30	8	"The Killer From Jusenkyo"; Transliteration: "Jusenkyō kara Kita Koroshiya" (Japanese: 呪泉郷から来た殺し屋)	June 8, 1990
The Jusenkyo Morals Committee have agreed that Ranma and all the other cursed characters have violated their laws and have sent a violent man named Kin'nee to punish them. Genma, along with Shampoo and Mousse are captured, which makes Ranma responsible for saving them. However, the big and brusque Kin'nee also turns out to be cursed, as he becomes a lanky and timid priest when splashed.
31	9	"Am I... Pretty? Ranma's Declaration of Womanhood"; Transliteration: "Watashi Kirei? Ranma Onna Sengen" (Japanese: 私ってきれい?乱馬女宣言)	June 15, 1990
Ranma accidentally smashes his head onto a rock during training and starts to act feminine both in his male and female forms.
32	10	"Final Facedown! Happosai vs. The Invisible Man"; Transliteration: "Taiketsu! Happōsai Buiesu Tōmeiningen" (Japanese: 対決!八宝斉VS透明人間)	June 22, 1990
After coming home from a long trip, Soun and Genma claim that they have learned a new technique of invisibility from a Mandarin ninja, Chengensai, they met on their journey to defeat Happosai.
33	11	"Les Misérables of the Kuno Estate"; Transliteration: "Kunōke no Re Miseraburu" (Japanese: 九能家のレ·ミゼラブル)	June 29, 1990
Sasuke Sarugakure runs away from the Kuno estate after an argument with his master Tatewaki Kuno. After Kuno realizes his mistake, he searches for his manservant.
34	12	"Ghost Story! Ranma and the Magic Sword"; Transliteration: "Kaidan! Ranma to Mashō no Ken" (Japanese: 怪談!乱馬と魔性の剣)	July 6, 1990
Ukyo sets up a group of students to investigate the rumors of a ghost at school. But when they go at night, the group separates. Ranma's group hear all the other groups scream. Each time, the screaming group is left with scratches all over their bodies. The rumored ghost turns out to be Kuno possessed by the sword of Miyamoto Musashi.
35	13	"All It Takes is One! The Kiss of Love is the Kiss of Death"; Transliteration: "Hitotsubu Korori – Zetsurin Hore Gusuri" (Japanese: 一粒コロリ·絶倫ホレ薬)	July 13, 1990
Happosai finds an arm band with three love pills: one for an instant, the second for a day, and the third for a lifetime. The love pill will activate when the consumer beholds the opposite sex. When Akane accidentally takes the lifetime pill, everyone prevents her from looking at the wrong person.
36	14	"The Ultimate Team-up!? The Ryoga/Mousse Alliance"; Transliteration: "Shijō Saikyō? Ryōga to Mūsu Dōmei" (Japanese: 史上最強?良牙とムース同盟)	July 20, 1990
Finding Ryoga terribly depressed after getting beaten by Ranma, Mousse suggests they team up, combining their skills to get revenge.
37	15	"Back to the Happosai!"; Transliteration: "Bakku Tu Za Happōsai" (Japanese: バック·トゥ·ザ·八宝斉)	July 27, 1990
Happosai's magic mirror sends him, Ranma, Akane, Soun, Genma, Shampoo, and Cologne back to the time of Happosai and Cologne's youth in China.
38	16	"Kodachi the Black Rose! The Beeline to True Love"; Transliteration: "Kurobara no Kodachi! Jun'ai Icchokusen" (Japanese: 黒バラの小太刀!純愛一直線)	August 3, 1990
The Tendo dojo is now hitting hard times, so Ranma and Akane try to recruit new students. Kodachi Kuno hears this and promises Ranma that she will help finance the dojo if they marry.
39	17	"The Last Days of Happosai...?"; Transliteration: "Happōsai Saigo no Hi?" (Japanese: 八宝斉 最期の日?)	August 10, 1990
Miyo, a divination schoolmate of Akane, tells Akane that she and Ranma would marry within a week and something bad will happen to Happosai. As Happosai becomes feverish, Soun and Genma decide that Ranma and Akane will marry in case the old man were to die. Eventually, everyone else but Akane falls ill as well, forcing Akane to make a special medicine to make everyone well again and postpone the wedding.
40	18	"Two, Too Violent Girls: Ling-Ling & Lung-Lung"; Transliteration: "Abarenbō Musume Rinrin Ranran" (Japanese: 暴れん坊娘リンリンランラン)	August 17, 1990
Ling-Ling and Lung-Lung, the two sisters of Shampoo, have come to see her. It was mentioned that Shampoo was defeated by Ranma in female form, and thus was forced to kill him according to the law. The sister later learned that Shampoo ignored this law, which, in turn, they decide to take it upon themselves.
41	19	"Ranma and the Evil Within"; Transliteration: "Ranma wo Osō Kyōfu no Tatari" (Japanese: 乱馬を襲う恐怖のタタリ)	August 24, 1990
After Ranma jokingly expressed his desire to be a girl, Happosai uses a technique to split Ranma's male and female selves. But Ranma's female self created by the technique is evil and tries to tempt his male self to be evil as well, causing problems for Akane, Genma, Shampoo, and Cologne.
42	20	"Enter Ken and His Copycat Kerchief"; Transliteration: "Toujou! Monomane Kakutōgi" (Japanese: 登場!ものまね格闘技)	August 31, 1990
The infamous martial artist Copycat Ken has not only the ability to copy one's techniques and stance, but also their appearance and strength. He uses his skills against Ranma in combat, fighting a neck and neck battle.
43	21	"Ryoga's Miracle Cure! Hand Over That Soap"; Transliteration: "Ryōga no Taishitsu Kaizen Sekken!" (Japanese: 良牙の体質改善セッケン!)	September 7, 1990
Ryoga has obtained a soap that seems to have cured his curse. As he prepares for his date with Akane, Ranma in female form and Shampoo try to get their hands on the magical soap.
44	22	"Fight! The Anything-Goes Obstacle Course Race"; Transliteration: "Kakutō! Shōgaibutsu Rēsu" (Japanese: 格闘!障害物レース)	September 14, 1990
A giant obstacle course race is being held, and the first prize is a trip to China. Naturally, the whole group intends to win this race, and they enter the many levels of the obstacle course. Ultimately, Ryoga turns out victorious, but was unable to find his way to the airport.
45	23	"Ranma Goes Back to Jusenkyo at Last"; Transliteration: "Ranma, Tsuini Jusenkyō e Iku" (Japanese: 乱馬, ついに呪泉郷へ行く)	September 21, 1990
Ranma and Genma steal Happosai's magic mirror, and travel back to Jusenkyo with the old goat tagging along. Much to their surprise they arrive just at the time of their previous visit, giving them a perfect opportunity to stop them from falling into the cursed springs altogether.
