= OOC =

OOC may refer to:

- Out of context, logical fallacy
- Out of character, breaking character in theatrics and roleplay
- Original Omnibus Company, a range of scale-model Buses and Trams released by Corgi Classics
- Old Oak Common, an area of London
  - Old Oak Common TMD, railway depot in that area
  - Old Oak Common railway station, a planned railway station in that area
- Oman Oil Company, a national oil investment company of Oman
- Order of Canada
- Organ-on-a-chip

== Computer science ==
- Object-Oriented Code, programming paradigm

== See also ==
- Out of Control (disambiguation)
