= Sasano =

Sasano (written: 笹野) is a Japanese surname. Notable people with the surname include:

- Hiroshi Sasano, Japanese middle-distance runner
- Michiru Sasano, Japanese pop singer and songwriter
- Takashi Sasano (笹野 高史, born 1948), Japanese actor
