= Ranma ½ season 2 =

Ranma ½
- Season 2
- Cover of the DVD box set by Viz.
- No. of episodes: 22

Release
- Original network: Fuji TV
- Original release: October 20, 1989 – April 13, 1990

Season chronology
- ← Previous; Season 1 Next → Season 3

This article lists the episodes and short summaries of the first 22 episodes of the Ranma ½ Nettōhen (らんま 1/2 熱闘編) anime series, known in the English dub as the second season of Ranma ½ or "Anything-Goes Martial Arts".

Rumiko Takahashi's manga series Ranma ½ was adapted into two anime series: Ranma ½ which ran on Fuji TV for 18 episodes and Ranma ½ Nettōhen which ran for 143. The first TV series was canceled due to low ratings in September 1989, but was then brought back a month later as the much more popular and much longer-running Ranma ½ Nettōhen.

Viz Media licensed both anime for English dubs and labeled them as one. They released them in North America in seven DVD collections they call "seasons". The first 22 episodes of Nettōhen are season 2, which was given the titled "Anything-Goes Martial Arts". The ordering of several episodes was also re-arranged, effectively putting them closer to the order they appear in the original manga.

The introductory piece "Ranma You Pervert" is the lone opening theme for the first 6 episodes and for episodes 14 to 22. For episodes 7 to 13 the opening theme is "Little★Date" (リトル★デイト, Ritoru Deito) by Ribbon, with "Ranma You Pervert" following as a refresher. The third closing theme is "Don't Mind China Boy" (ド·ン·マ·イ来々少年, Don Mai Rairai Boi) by Etsuko Nishio.

== Episode list ==
No. overall	No. in season	Title	Directed by	Written by	Storyboarded by	Animation directed by	Original release date
19	1	"Clash of the Delivery Girls! The Martial Arts Takeout Race"; Transliteration: "Gekitotsu! Demae Kakutō Rēsu" (Japanese: 激突!出前格闘レース)	Tomomi Mochizuki	Toshiki Inoue	Koji Sawai	Atsuko Nakajima	October 20, 1989
Years ago, Genma Saotome, at the brink of starvation, encountered a man who offered to trade some fish for Ranma. In the present time, the man travels to Tokyo in order to claim Ranma as his future son-in-law. A martial arts take-out race ensues, wherein Akane's loss will mean Ranma's marriage to the man's daughter.
20	2	"You Really Do Hate Cats!"; Transliteration: "Yappari Neko ga Kirai?" (Japanese: やっぱり猫が嫌い?)	Noriyuki Nakamura	Hiroshi Toda	Tamiko Kojima	Asami Endo	November 3, 1989
A cat sent by Shampoo arrives in the Tendo dojo, much to Ranma's horror, who has ailurophobia, the morbid fear of cats. Tatewaki Kuno finds this out from his manservant Sasuke Sarugakure. When Kuno uses this fear to his advantage by having Sasuke put cats on Ranma's path, Ranma eventually loses control of himself and starts to act like a cat, thereby unleashing the deadly "Cat Fu" technique.
21	3	"This Ol' Gal's the Leader of the Amazon Tribe!"; Transliteration: "Watashi ga Joketsuzoku no Obaba!" (Japanese: 私が女傑族のおばば!)	Shinji Takagi	Hiroshi Toda	Shinji Takagi	Atsuko Nakajima	November 10, 1989
The cat Shampoo sent to the Tendo dojo turns out to be Shampoo herself, who has been cursed after training at Jusenkyo following her failure to kill female Ranma. She has now settled in Japan together with her great grandmother Cologne.
22	4	"Behold! The 'Chestnuts Roasting on an Open Fire' Technique"; Transliteration: "Deta! Hissatsu Tenshin Amaguriken" (Japanese: 出た!必殺天津甘栗拳!!)	Kazuhiro Furuhashi	Yoshiyuki Suga	Kazuhiro Furuhashi	Masaki Kudo	November 17, 1989
Ranma finds out that Cologne cursed him with "Full Body Cats Tongue," which prevents him from reverting from his female form. To get the antidote, the Phoenix Pill, from Cologne, Ranma must master the "Hissatsu Tenshin Amaguriken" technique in his female form.
23	5	"Enter Mousse! The Fist of the White Swan"; Transliteration: "Hakushōken no Otoko Mūsu Tōjō!" (Japanese: 白鳥拳の男ムース登場!)	Takashi Kobayashi	Hisashi Tokimura	Tamiko Kojima	Asami Endo	November 24, 1989
Dr. Tofu Ono temporarily cures Ranma of the "Full Body Cats Tongue." Ranma now faces Mousse, who sees Ranma as a rival for Shampoo's affection.
24	6	"Cool Runnings! The Race of the Snowmen"; Transliteration: "Bakusō! Yukidaruma Hakobi Rēsu" (Japanese: 爆走!雪だるま運びレース)	Noriyuki Nakamura	Kazuhito Hisajima	Koji Sawai	Atsuko Nakajima	December 1, 1989
The Tendos and Saotomes are vacationing in a ski resort, and so are Shampoo and Cologne. Ranma competes in a "snowman carry" race to win the Phoenix Pill and cure himself from the "Full Body Cats Tongue."
25	7	"The Abduction of P-Chan"; Transliteration: "Sarawareta P-chan" (Japanese: さらわれたPちゃん!)	Kazuhiro Furuhashi	Toshiki Inoue	Kazuhiro Furuhashi	Asami Endo	December 8, 1989
Azusa Shiratori and Mikado Sanzenin, also known as the Golden Pair, find P-chan when Akane loses sight of him. Azusa refuses to return P-chan to Akane, claiming him as Charlotte. Ranma and Akane must team up against Azusa and Mikado in what turns into the "Charlotte Cup."
26	8	"Close Call! The Dance of Death... On Ice!"; Transliteration: "Kikiippatsu! Shiryō no Bonodori" (Japanese: 危機一髪!死霊の盆踊り)	Shinji Takagi	Aya Matsui	Shinji Takagi	Atsuko Nakajima	December 15, 1989
Mikado kisses Ranma in female form, causing Ranma to go ballistic, charging at Mikado like a madman. Ranma barely wins, but Mikado will exact his revenge in the upcoming martial arts figure skating tournament.
27	9	"P-Chan Explodes! The Icy Fountain of Love!"; Transliteration: "P-chan Bakuhatsu! Ai no Mizubashira" (Japanese: Pちゃん爆発!愛の水柱)	Tomomi Mochizuki	Hiroyuki Kawasaki	Tomomi Mochizuki	Masako Gotō	December 22, 1989
While Ranma and Akane are dealing with the Golden Pair, Ryoga Hibiki becomes so jealous he tries to get rid of Ranma so he can take over as Akane's partner. Unfortunately, Ryoga's plans backfires, causing him to pair up with Ranma in female form.
28	10	"Ranma Trains on Mt. Terror"; Transliteration: "Ranma Kyōfu no Yama Gomori" (Japanese: 乱馬恐怖の山ごもり)	Shinji Takagi	Yoshiyuki Suga	Shinji Takagi	Masaki Kudo	January 12, 1990
Tired of getting beaten by Ranma, Ryoga takes up Cologne's offer to train him. They set off to the mountains, only to find Genma, Ranma and Akane already there, also training.
29	11	"The Breaking Point!? Ryoga's Great Revenge"; Transliteration: "Bakusai Tenketsu to wa? Ryōga Daigyakushū" (Japanese: 爆砕点穴とは?良牙大逆襲)	Kazuhiro Furuhashi	Yoshiyuki Suga	Kazuhiro Furuhashi	Asami Endo	January 19, 1990
Cologne is teaching Ryoga the fearsome "Bakusai Tenketsu" technique, making him capable of shattering giant boulders with a single touch. He is confident that he can defeat Ranma with this technique, unless the training backfires on him.
30	12	"Danger at the Tendo Dojo!"; Transliteration: "Ayoushi! Tendō Dōjō" (Japanese: 危うし!天道道場)	Chisato Shigeki	Hisashi Tokimura	Chisato Shigeki	Atsuko Nakajima	January 26, 1990
The Tendo dojo receives a challenge from the Dojo Destroyer, and Soun Tendo charges Akane and Ranma with task of defending its honor. Ranma however, gets other things on his mind, when Shampoo promises to give him a cure for the curse if he'll only go on a date with her.
31	13	"The Abduction of Akane!"; Transliteration: "Sarawareta Akane!" (Japanese: さらわれたあかね!)	Takashi Kobayashi	Hiroko Naka	Masahisa Ishida	Masaki Kudo	February 2, 1990
Mousse returns, trying to kidnap Akane, but ends up mistakenly grabbing her stuffed toy pig instead. Still, Akane wants her pig back, so Ranma goes along with the instructions to meet up with the kidnapper at the circus.
32	14	"Ranma vs. Mousse! To Lose Is To Win"; Transliteration: "Taiketsu Mūsu! Makeru ga Kachi" (Japanese: 対決ムース!負けるが勝ち)	Noriyuki Nakamura	Hiroshi Toda	Masahisa Ishida	Asami Endo	February 9, 1990
Having managed to grab the right person this time, Mousse showcases a trick to turn Akane into a duck with the use of the water gathered by the Jusenkyo hot spring of the drowned duck. Ranma brings home a real duck and almost considers marriage, assuming it was Akane. Ranma and Mousse fight for Shampoo. Shampoo gives Mousse weapons that hurt more than help.
33	15	"Enter Happosai, the Lustful Lecher!"; Transliteration: "Kyūkyoku no Ero Yōkai Happōsai" (Japanese: 究極のエロ妖怪八宝斉)	Shinji Takagi	Yoshiyuki Suga	Tamiko Kojima	Atsuko Nakajima	February 16, 1990
Soun and Genma are terrified when their old master, Happosai, shows up. The founder of the anything-goes school of martial arts, his fighting skills are only surpassed by his lust for women's underwear.
34	16	"Assault on the Girls' Locker Room"; Transliteration: "Joshi Kōishitsu wo Osoe?" (Japanese: 女子更衣室を襲え?)	Kazuhiro Furuhashi	Hiroshi Toda	Kazuhiro Furuhashi	Masaki Kudo	February 23, 1990
Ryoga finds a map of a Japanese spring of the drowned man somewhere in Tokyo and Ranma later tries to help. However they come to realize that the spring is buried under the girls' locker room.
35	17	"Kuno's House of Gadgets! Guests Check In, But They Don't Check Out"; Transliteration: "Oni mo Nigedasu Karakuri Yashiki" (Japanese: 鬼も逃げだすカラクリ屋敷)	Chisato Shigeki	Kazuhito Hisajima	Koji Sawai	Asami Endo	March 2, 1990
When an urn is found by Ranma and Ryoga in the girls' locker room, Cologne confirms it is one of three urns used to locate the Japanese spring of the drowned man. Unfortunately for Ranma, the second one is buried in the Kuno estate.
36	18	"Goodbye Girl-Type"; Transliteration: "Kore de Onna to Osaraba?" (Japanese: これで女とおさらば?)	Takashi Kobayashi	Hiroshi Toda	Tamiko Kojima	Atsuko Nakajima	March 9, 1990
Happosai has decided to use one of the two urns Ranma found to store his underwear collection. Ranma manages to wrestle the urn from the old man and find the third urn. To everyone's dismay, the Japanese spring of the drowned man has been out of business for years.
37	19	"It's a Fine Line Between Pleasure and Pain"; Transliteration: "Ai to Nikushimi no Okurimono" (Japanese: 愛と憎しみの贈物)	Noriyuki Nakamura	Hiroko Naka	Kazuhiro Furuhashi	Masaki Kudo	March 16, 1990
Ranma thought there was nothing scarier than trying Akane's cooking, that is until Kodachi Kuno came along. Kuno's younger sister is as stubborn, spoiled, and crazy as he is. Moreover, she will not cease until she gets what she wants, which, in this unfortunate case, happens to be Ranma.
38	20	"S.O.S.! The Wrath of Happosai"; Transliteration: "SOS Ero Yōkai Happōsai" (Japanese: SOSエロ妖怪八宝斉)	Shinji Takagi	Yoshiyuki Suga	Koji Sawai	Asami Endo	March 23, 1990
Having insulted Happosai one too many times, the old man proves to be as fearsome as he claimed as he unleashes his wrath on the disrespectful Ranma. Ranma comes back with a patch to sew on, disguised as a repellent for girls.
39	21	"Kissing is Such Sweet Sorrow! The Taking of Akane's Lips"; Transliteration: "Akane no Kuchibiru wo Ubae" (Japanese: あかねの口びるを奪え)	Takashi Kobayashi	Hiroshi Toda	Masahisa Ishida	Atsuko Nakajima	April 6, 1990
Akane has been chosen to play the part of Juliet. On the other hand, Kuno and Happosai vie for the part of Romeo. Upon hearing that the person who plays Romeo gets to see China, Ranma vies for the role too.
40	22	"Bathhouse Battle! We're in Some Hot Water Now"; Transliteration: "Ii Yu da na? Sentou de Sentou" (Japanese: いい湯だな?銭湯で戦闘)	Kazuhiro Furuhashi	Hiroko Naka	Kazuhiro Furuhashi	Hiroko Kazui	April 13, 1990
The bathtub in the Tendo dojo is broken, so Ranma, Akane, Nabiki, and even Happosai head to the local bath house. Trouble starts when Happosai uses this chance to see Akane and Nabiki naked.
