= Ranma ½ season 6 =

Ranma ½
- Season 6
- Cover of the DVD box set by Viz.
- No. of episodes: 24

Release
- Original network: Fuji TV
- Original release: September 27, 1991 – April 3, 1992

Season chronology
- ← Previous; Season 5 Next → Season 7

This article lists the episodes and short summaries of the 95th to 118th episodes of the Ranma ½ Nettōhen (らんま 1/2 熱闘編) anime series, known in the English dub as the sixth season of Ranma ½ or "Random Rhapsody".

Rumiko Takahashi's manga series Ranma ½ was adapted into two anime series: Ranma ½ which ran on Fuji TV for 18 episodes and Ranma ½ Nettōhen which ran for 143. The first TV series was canceled due to low ratings in September 1989, but was then brought back in December as the much more popular and much longer-running Ranma ½ Nettōhen.

Viz Media licensed both anime for English dubs and labeled them as one. They released them in North America in seven DVD collections they call "seasons". Nettōhen episodes 95 to 118 are season 6, which was given the title "Random Rhapsody".

The opening and closing theme songs up to episode 99 are "Earth Orchestra" (地球オーケストラ, Chikyū Ōkesutora) by Kusu Kusu and "Red Poppy" (ひなげし, Hinageshi) by Michiyo Nakajima respectively. The second are "Don't Cry Anymore" (もう泣かないで, Mō Nakanaide) by Azusa Senou and "Positive" by Miho Morikawa. For episode 118 the themes are "Love Seeker (Can't Stop It)" (ラブ·シーカー~CAN’T STOP IT, Ravu Shīkā ~ Can't Stop It) by the band Vision and "Hill of the Rainbow and the Sun" (虹と太陽の丘, Niji to Taiyō no Oka) by Piyo Piyo.

== Episode list ==
No. overall	No. in season	Title	Original release date
95	113	"Dear Daddy... Love, Kodachi!"; Transliteration: "Kodachi no Mai Raburī Papa" (Japanese: 小太刀のマイラブリーパパ)	September 27, 1991
Kodachi is shocked to learn that Principal Kuno is her father. When she invites him to stay at the Kuno residence, the scene is set for her brother's worst nightmare.
96	114	"Enter Gosunkugi, The New Rival!?"; Transliteration: "Kyōteki? Gosunkugi-kun Tōjō" (Japanese: 強敵?五寸釘くん登場)	October 4, 1991
While trying to save him from one of the lunches for Akane, Ranma inadvertently becomes the object of the wrath of one Hikaru Gosunkugi, known as the most incompetent voodoo geek the world has ever seen.
97	115	"Ranma's Calligraphy Challenge"; Transliteration: "Ranma wa Hetakuso? Kakutō Shodō" (Japanese: 乱馬はヘタクソ?格闘書道)	October 11, 1991
Sotatsu, a master of martial arts calligraphy, has been recognized as undefeated. Naturally, Ranma wants to change that, but finds it difficult when Sotatsu will only accept challenges from people with beautiful handwriting.
98	116	"The Secret Don of Furinkan High"; Transliteration: "Furinkan Kōkō, Kage no Don Tōjō" (Japanese: 風林館高校, 影のドン登場)	October 18, 1991
Deep within the bowels of Furinkan High School, Ranma discovers a second school store, run by a crazy old man named Toramasa Kobayashi with a secret that Principal Kuno is desperate to keep from getting out, for which he had received a failing grade in English.
99	117	"Back to the Way We Were... Please!"; Transliteration: "Higan! Futsū no Otoko ni Modoritai" (Japanese: 悲願!普通の男に戻りたい)	October 25, 1991
Ranma, Ryoga and Mousse each purchase a bag of magic powder, one of which is capable of curing their curse while the other 2 will turn them into anything. The three head up into the mountains to figure out which bag will do the trick.
100	118	"Ryoga Inherits the Saotome School?"; Transliteration: "Saotome Ryū no Atotsugi wa Ryōga?" (Japanese: 早乙女流の跡継ぎは良牙?)	November 1, 1991
Furious at Ranma for eating his sweets, Genma decides to make Ryoga his disciple and heir, ergo being Akane's fiancé. Ranma and Ryoga later have a match, with Akane as collateral.
101	119	"Tendo Family Goes to the Amusement Park!"; Transliteration: "Tendō-ke, Yūenchi e Iku" (Japanese: 天道家, 遊園地へ行く)	November 15, 1991
Dr. Tofu gets a free pass to an amusement park and invites Kasumi, who takes the rest of household with her. Once there, they have realized their shortage of money, and their absence of food. So the whole gang participates in kart racing, with a full course dinner being the prize.
102	120	"The Case of the Furinkan Stalker!"; Transliteration: "Furinkan Kōkō: Toorima Jiken" (Japanese: 風林館高校·通り魔事件)	November 29, 1991
A masked man sporting a black pigtail hairstyle is stalking female high school students at nighttime. Ranma becomes the prime suspect of the investigation. It is later revealed that Gosunkugi is responsible for these incidents.
103 104	122 123	"The Demon from Jusenkyo"; Transliteration: "Jusenkyō Kara Kita Akuma" (Japanese: 呪泉郷から来た悪魔)	December 6, 1991 December 13, 1991
Part 1: Akane is kidnapped by a youth known as Pantyhose Taro, in which he is capable of turning into a chimera. It is explained how Happosai is to blame for his curse. Part 2: Ranma, Ryoga, Shampoo, and Mousse arrive at the clifftop hideout to battle Taro in order to rescue Akane. This proves to be difficult as everyone is repeatedly splashed with water.
105	125	"A Xmas Without Ranma"; Transliteration: "Ranma ga Inai Xmas" (Japanese: 乱馬がいないXmas)	December 20, 1991
Ranma tells Akane to head back home during their Christmas shopping at the mall. Worried about him, she begins searching for him around town, asking where he has been. When Akane finally finds Ranma, she is overjoyed to learn that he had been shopping for her wishlist.
106	126	"A Cold Day in Furinkan"; Transliteration: "Yukinko Fuyu Monogatari" (Japanese: 雪ん子冬物語)	January 10, 1992
A mysterious snow girl holding a flute is brought back to the Tendo dojo in hospitality, after Ryoga reports about Yeti sightings. Ranma, and later Ryoga, locates the dwelling of the Yeti, going in combat against it. It is realized that the Yeti is the pet of snow girl, as she plays the flute to calm it down.
107	128	"Curse of the Scribbled Panda"; Transliteration: "Rakugaki Panda no Noroi" (Japanese: らくがきパンダの呪い)	January 17, 1992
While fighting with his father over takoyaki, Ranma accidentally sets free three unspeakably evil spirits, one of which is a scribbled panda come to live that wants a date with him.
108	121	"The Date-Monster of Watermelon Island"; Transliteration: "Suikatō no Kōsaiki" (Japanese: スイカ島の交際鬼)	January 24, 1992
Kuno washes up on the beach with a watermelon on his head and suffering from amnesia. Ranma in female form is chased by Kuno to the watermelon island training ground, hoping to help Kuno regain his memory.
109	129	"Legend of the Lucky Panda!"; Transliteration: "Shiawase no Panda Densetsu" (Japanese: 幸せのパンダ伝説)	January 31, 1992
While out in the wilderness, Genma falls into a river and hits his head. When he wakes up he finds himself in an earlier time, near a village inhabited by familiar faces.
110 111	131 132	"Ukyo's Secret Sauce"; Transliteration: "Ranma to Ukyo ga Sōsu Sōai?/Itsuwari Fūfu yo Eien ni..." (Japanese: 乱馬と右京がソース相愛?/偽り夫婦よ永遠に...)	February 7, 1992 February 14, 1992
Part 1: Ukyo samples a taste of her secret sauce after a decade of fermentation, however she collapses in disgust. She is taken to the Tendo dojo for a recovery period. Due to Ranma being exceedingly affable to his childhood friend, Akane grows increasingly jealous, suspecting an ulterior motive. Part 2: Nabiki schemes the scenario that Ranma and Akane are already married. However, Ukyo, unwilling to indulge herself, plans to force this couple to keep up the charade around the clock.
112	124	"The Missing Matriarch of Martial Arts Tea!"; Transliteration: "Kakutō Sadō! Sarawareta Iemoto" (Japanese: 格闘茶道!さらわれた家元)	February 21, 1992
Sentaro shows up fearing for his life, wanting Ranma and Akane to help rescue his kidnapped matriarchal grandmother. It is reviewed that the martial arts tea ceremony was practiced by two opposing schools. The three enter the rivaled school to find the Daimonji matriarch. Sentaro meets Satsuki Miyakoji, successor of the rivaled school, and becomes betrothed to her, joining the two schools together.
113	127	"Akane Goes to the Hospital!"; Transliteration: "Taihen! Akane ga Nyūin Shita" (Japanese: 大変!あかねが入院した)	February 28, 1992
Distracted by Ranma scuffling with Gosunkugi, Akane gets a bone fracture during gym class and has to spend the next few days in Dr. Tofu's clinic. Everyone comes to visit her, with the exception of Ranma, inasmuch as being indecisive of what to say to her.
114	130	"Mystery of the Marauding Octopus Pot!"; Transliteration: "Nazono Abare Takotsubo Arawareru?!" (Japanese: 謎の暴れタコツボ現る?!)	March 6, 1992
Ranma, Genma, and Soun are hired to rid a seaside resort of the nasty marauding octopus pot that has been terrorizing the guests. Unfortunately for them, it turns out to be Happosai in a pot.
115	134	"Gosunkugi's Paper Dolls of Love"; Transliteration: "Gosunkugi! Ah Koi no Kaminingyō" (Japanese: 五寸釘!あぁ恋の紙人形)	March 13, 1992
Gosunkugi obtains a set of magic paper dolls, capable of forcing someone to obey whatever command is written on them when they are attached to someone's back. Ranma later figures this out, and he tries to prevent Gosunkugi from attaching a paper doll on Akane's back to score a date with her.
116	135	"Akane's Unfathomable Heart"; Transliteration: "Akane no Kokoro ga Wakaranai" (Japanese: あかねの心がわからない)	March 20, 1992
Satori, a telepathic adolescent male, shows up at the Tendo dojo. He later gets upset when everyone doubts his special ability. Thereupon, Satori constantly pesters and annoys Ranma with mind reading.
117	133	"A Teenage Ghost Story"; Transliteration: "Tsuiseki! Temari Uta no Nazo" (Japanese: 追跡!手まり唄の謎)	March 27, 1992
When Akane reads aloud the words of an old notebook found in Toramasa's store, the ghost of a teenage girl named Kogane Musashi appears hauntingly reciting lyrics, hoping to find what she has lost. Using the innuendos of the lyrics, Ranma and Akane are led to a cave under a shrine which tunnels back to the store, in which it is realized that a stuffed animal was the lost item.
118	136	"Master and Student... Forever!?"; Transliteration: "Mou Anata kara Hanarenai" (Japanese: もうあなたから離れない)	April 3, 1992
Happosai's plan to teach Ranma respect has backfired, during the case when two magic tablets are consumed, resulting in Happosai being permanently clung onto Ranma. The effects of the tablets causes Ranma to serve Happosai forthrightly. Still and all, the only way the two can be separated if it Ranma defeats Happosai in battle.
