= Ranma ½ season 1 =

Ranma ½
- Season 1
- Cover of the DVD box set by Viz, depicting main character Ranma Saotome.
- No. of episodes: 18

Release
- Original network: Fuji TV
- Original release: April 15 – September 16, 1989

Season chronology
- Next → Season 2

This article lists the episodes and short summaries of the original Ranma ½ anime series, known in the English dub as the first season of Ranma ½ or "Digital Dojo".

An anime adaptation of Rumiko Takahashi's manga series Ranma ½ (らんま 1/2) debuted on Fuji TV on April 15, 1989. It was canceled due to low ratings after only 18 episodes, with the last airing on September 16, 1989. However, the series was reworked by most of the same staff, retitled Ranma ½ Nettōhen (らんま 1/2 熱闘編) and debuted in December of that same year. It went on to become much more popular, lasting for 143 episodes.

Viz Media licensed both anime for English dubs and labeled them as one. They released them in North America in seven DVD collections they call "seasons". The first Ranma ½ series is season 1, which was given the titled "Digital Dojo".

Episode 13 included a next episode preview to "The Abduction of P-Chan". However, "The Abduction of P-Chan" and the two following episodes that continue the story were not broadcast because of several kidnappings in Japan at the time. This causes a very slight plot hole in episode 15, which includes flashbacks to the then unaired episodes. They were later broadcast as Ranma ½ Nettōhen episodes 7-9. In the Blu-ray release, these three episodes are switched back to episodes 14-16 of the first anime, as originally planned.

The opening theme is "Don't Make Me Wild Like You", also known as "Don't Make Me a Shrew" (じゃじゃ馬にさせないで, Jajauma ni Sasenaide; "jajauma" is a term for a cute girl who acts masculine or violent) by Etsuko Nishio. The first closing theme is "Let's Keep It Friends" (プラトニックつらぬいて, Puratonikku Tsuranuite) by Kaori Sakagami, used in the first thirteen episodes. The second closing, CoCo's "Equal Romance" (EQUAL ロマンス, Equal Romansu), is used in the final five episodes.

== Episode list ==
No. overall	No. in season	Title	Directed by	Written by	Storyboarded by	Animation directed by	Original release date
1	1	"Here's Ranma" "The Strange Stranger from China"; Transliteration: "Chūgoku kara Kita Aitsu! Chotto Hen!!" (Japanese: 中国からきたあいつ!ちょっとヘン!!)	Tomomi Mochizuki	Yoshio Urasawa	Tomomi Mochizuki	Atsuko Nakajima	April 15, 1989
The Tendo family is visited by a girl and her panda, who turn out to be sex-shifter Ranma Saotome and his father Genma. Father and child recount their memories of how a trip to the Chinese training ground Jusenkyo gave them their strange transformation abilities.
2	2	"School Is No Place for Horsing Around"; Transliteration: "Asobi Janai no Yo Gakkō wa" (Japanese: 遊びじゃないのよ学校は)	Takeshi Mori	Yoshio Urasawa	Takeshi Mori	Masako Gotō	April 22, 1989
Ranma spends his first day in Akane and Nabiki's school, Furinkan High School. There, Ranma begins his rivalry with upperclassman Tatewaki Kuno over Akane.
3	3	"A Sudden Storm of Love"; Transliteration: "Ikinari Ai no Arashi Chotto Matte Yo" (Japanese: いきなり愛の嵐ちょっと待ってョ)	Yamauchi Shigeyasu	Hashimoto Hiroshi	Yamauchi Shigeyasu	Asami Endo	April 29, 1989
During a fight, Ranma and Kuno jump into the school swimming pool, thus the first meeting between Kuno and "the Pigtailed Girl" (female Ranma). Female Ranma beats Kuno, who becomes fascinated with her.
4	4	"Ranma and... Ranma? If It's Not One Thing, It's Another"; Transliteration: "Ranma to Ranma? Gokai ga Tomaranai" (Japanese: 乱馬とらんま?誤解がとまらない)	Tomomi Mochizuki	Hashimoto Hiroshi	Tomomi Mochizuki	Atsuko Nakajima	May 6, 1989
Nabiki becomes an intermediary between Kuno and the "Pigtailed Girl" by selling photos of Akane and female Ranma to Kuno.
5	5	"Love Me to the Bone! The Compound Fracture of Akane's Heart"; Transliteration: "Kotsu Made Aishite? Akane Koi no Fukuzatsu Kossetsu" (Japanese: 骨まで愛して?あかね恋の複雑骨折)	Kazuhiro Furuhashi	Yoshio Urasawa	Tamiko Kojima	Masako Gotō	May 13, 1989
After injuring her father, Akane promises herself to not hurt again, only to break it after breaking Ranma's neck. Dr. Tofu repairs Ranma's contusions. The boys in Furinkan High stop fighting Akane, realizing Kuno's loss against Ranma. Akane realizes that Dr. Tofu loves Kasumi.
6	6	"Akane's Lost Love... These Things Happen, You Know"; Transliteration: "Akane no Shitsuren Datte Shōganai Janai" (Japanese: あかねの失恋だってしょうがないじゃない)	Shinji Takagi	Hashimoto Hiroshi	Tomomi Mochizuki	Asami Endo	May 20, 1989
Dr. Tofu spaces out at the sight of Kasumi, injuring Ranma's neck. Akane gets depressed about Kasumi and Dr. Tofu's relationship and Akane explains how long Dr. Tofu has liked Kasumi.
7	7	"Enter Ryoga! The Eternal 'Lost Boy'"; Transliteration: "Tōjō! Eien no Mayoigo - Ryōga" (Japanese: 登場!永遠の迷い子·良牙)	Takeshi Mori	Yoshio Urasawa	Takeshi Mori	Atsuko Nakajima	May 27, 1989
Ryoga Hibiki arrives in Tokyo to settle an old score with Ranma.
8	8	"School Is a Battlefield! Ranma vs. Ryoga"; Transliteration: "Gakkō wa Senjō da! Taiketsu Ranma Buiesu Ryōga" (Japanese: 学校は戦場だ!対決 乱馬VS良牙)	Kazuhiro Furuhashi	Toshiki Inoue	Kazuhiro Furuhashi	Masako Gotō	June 3, 1989
Ryoga and Ranma fight inside Furinkan school grounds. Efforts by the school's Chemistry Club against Ranma fail. During the course of the match, that extends to the nearby zoo, Ryoga finds out about Ranma's curse and a stray "weapon" severely cuts Akane's hair.
9	9	"True Confessions! A Girl's Hair Is Her Life!"; Transliteration: "Otome Hakusho—Kami wa Onna no Inochi Nano" (Japanese: 乙女白書·髪は女のいのちなの)	Shinji Takagi	Toshiki Inoue	Shinji Takagi	Asami Endo	June 17, 1989
After the incident involving Akane's hair and further hair cuts from Kasumi, Akane now sports shorter hair, which Dr. Tofu now finds attractive. Ryoga gets lost trying to help a lady cross the street. A few nights later, Akane finds a pig in her house and names it P-chan, not realizing the pig is Ryoga, who is cursed himself.
10	10	"P-P-P-Chan! He's Good For Nothin'"; Transliteration: "Pi-pi-P-chan Roku Namonjanē" (Japanese: ピーピーPちゃん ろくなもんじゃねェ)	Takeshi Mori	Yoshiyuki Suga	Takeshi Mori	Atsuko Nakajima	July 1, 1989
Ranma realizes that P-chan is Ryoga, who has also been cursed by a spring in Jusenkyo. With Akane constantly handling P-chan, however, Ranma finds separating the pig from Akane would be difficult.
11	11	"Ranma Meets Love Head-On! Enter the Delinquent Juvenile Gymnast!"; Transliteration: "Ranma o Gekiai! Shintaisō no Sukeban Tōjō" (Japanese: 乱馬を激愛!新体操のスケバン登場)	Kazuhiro Furuhashi	Hiroyuki Kawasaki	Kazuhiro Furuhashi	Masako Gotō	July 15, 1989
Akane accepts the call for help from Furinkan High's rhythmic gymnastics team after they were beaten by Black Rose Kodachi. In a quest to injure Akane, Kodachi falls head over heels in love with Ranma after he saves her from a fall.
12	12	"A Woman's Love Is War! The Martial Arts Rhythmic Gymnastics Challenge!"; Transliteration: "Onna no Koi wa Sensō yo! Kakutō Shintaisō de Iza Shōbu" (Japanese: 女の恋は戦争よ!格闘新体操でいざ勝負)	Shinji Takagi	Katsuyuki Sumisawa	Yo Arisako	Asami Endo	July 22, 1989
Akane is slated to face Kodachi in an anything-goes rhythmic gymnastics bout. After she sprains her ankle, temporarily disabling her, Ranma becomes her substitute. The next day, Ranma faces Kodachi in the Anything-Goes Gymnastics Tournament.
13	13	"A Tear in a Girl-Delinquent's Eye? The End of the Martial Arts Rhythmic Gymnastics Challenge!"; Transliteration: "Sukeban no Me ni Namida? Rūru Muyō no Kakutō Shintaisō Kecchaku" (Japanese: スケバンの目に涙?ルール無用の格闘新体操決着)	Tomomi Mochizuki	Hideo Takayashiki	Tomomi Mochizuki	Atsuko Nakajima	July 29, 1989
Despite Kodachi's dirty tricks and P-chan's (Ryoga's) efforts to make Ranma lose, Ranma still defeats Kodachi by a post.
14	14	"Pelvic Fortune-Telling? Ranma Is the No. One Bride in Japan"; Transliteration: "Kotsuban Uranai! Ranma wa Nippon-ichi no Oyomesan" (Japanese: 骨盤占い!らんまは日本一のお嫁さん)	Takeshi Mori	Hiroyuki Kawasaki	Tsutomu Shibayama	Masako Gotō	August 19, 1989
As Dr. Tofu's mother Kin visits her son, Akane poses as his bride-to-be, but Nabiki offers to do the same thing for a fee, which Dr. Tofu accepts. Ranma is forced by Ryoga to join Kin's contest of having the girl with "the biggest hips" marry her son.
15	15	"Enter Shampoo, the Gung-Ho Girl! I Put My Life in Your Hands"; Transliteration: "Gekiretsu Shōjo Shanpū Tōjō! Watashi Inochi Azukemasu" (Japanese: 激烈少女シャンプー登場!ワタシ命あずけます)	Takeshi Mori	Katsuyuki Sumisawa	Takeshi Mori	Asami Endo	August 26, 1989
Shampoo, an Amazon defeated by female Ranma in China, comes to Japan to kill her. Ranma defeats her this time as a boy, but this development complicates things. The law among Shampoo's Amazon tribe states that a woman who defeats an Amazon warrior must be killed while a man who does the same thing becomes that Amazon's groom.
16	16	"Shampoo's Revenge! The Shiatsu Technique That Steals Heart and Soul"; Transliteration: "Shanpū no Hangeki! Hissatsu Shiatsu Kobushi wa Mukuro mo Kokoro mo Ubau" (Japanese: シャンプーの反撃!必殺指圧拳は身も心も奪う)	Kazuhiro Furuhashi	Katsuyuki Sumisawa	Kazuhiro Furuhashi	Atsuko Nakajima	September 2, 1989
Wanting to keep Ranma to herself, Shampoo applies her Shiatsu Technique and some magic shampoo on Akane to erase her memory of Ranma.
17	17	"I Love You, Ranma! Please Don't Say Goodbye"; Transliteration: "Ranma Daisuki! Sayonara wa Iwanaide!!" (Japanese: 乱馬大好き!さよならはいわないで!!)	Shinji Takagi	Aya Matsui	Shinji Takagi	Masako Gotō	September 9, 1989
Ranma manages to convince Shampoo to let him "almost kill" "girl-type Ranma" and sets out to let his female self be pummelled by Ryoga. Ryoga obliges to no avail. Ranma manages to restore Akane's memory of him using the word "un-cute" and other unforgettable insults. After Ranma reveals his female self to Shampoo, Shampoo returns to China, upset, confused, and heartbroken.
18	18	"I Am a Man! Ranma's Going Back to China!?"; Transliteration: "Ore wa Otoko da! Ranma Chūgoku e Kaeru?" (Japanese: オレは男だ!らんま中国へ帰る?)	Kazuhiro Furuhashi	Taku Nomoto	Kazuhiro Furuhashi	Atsuko Nakajima, etc	September 16, 1989
Ranma and Genma are having an argument after Ranma decides to go back to China alone and break his curse. Features clips from the previous seventeen episodes.
