= Sloppy Meateaters =

American punk band

- Origin: Rome, Georgia, United States
- Genres: Punk rock, alternative rock, pop punk
- Years active: 1998–2006
- Labels: Orange Peal Records
- Past members: Josh Chambers; Kevin Highfield; Travis Gerke; John Elwell; Lee Howell; Seth Smith

Sloppy Meateaters a.k.a. SME were an American punk band from Rome, Georgia. The band was formed in July 1999 by founding members Josh Chambers and Kevin Highfield.

== History ==
=== Origins (1999) ===
The band was formed by Josh Chambers and Kevin Highfield in their hometown of Rome, Georgia in 1999. In October 1999, the Sloppy Meateaters recorded their debut album, Shameless Self-Promotion. The album was first released without a record label in December 1999. They signed with Orange Peal Records in 2000. Later that year, they made an appearance on Farmclub.com.

=== 2001-present ===
Sloppy Meateaters released Forbidden Meat in 2001 on Orange Peal Records. The band spent the year touring in support of the new album, booking all of the tours themselves. SME played one show at the Rock N Roll Hall of Fame, did a week on the Warped tour, and ended the tour in the fall of 2001 by crashing their van into a police car on the interstate.

By the following spring, SME did a number of tours including the Vans Warped Tour. Highfield left the band and the group went on hiatus in 2003.

The band regrouped in 2004 and began working on a new album. They released their third album Conditioned by the Laugh Track in 2005.

== 2020–2021: Member Passings ==
John Elwell, bassist and later lead guitarist for Sloppy Meateaters, died in October 2020. Touring guitarist, Dalton Bohanan died on August 2, 2021. Both were beloved for their songwriting and musicianship.

== Band members ==
SME family members

- Josh Chambers
- Kevin Highfield
- Brent Elridge
- Lee Scott
- Travis Gerke
- John Elwell
- Chris Frisby
- Will Tallman
- Lee Howell
- Seth Smith
- Dalton Bohanan

== Discography ==
Studio Album

- Shameless Self-Promotion (1999)
- Forbidden Meat (2001)
- Conditioned by the Laugh Track (2005)

Miscellaneous

- Eat Meat Cuz It's Fun – Demo (2000)
- Sloppy Meateaters & Napkin – with Split CD (2000)
- Razor Freestyle Scooter Soundtrack – tracks: Outta Control and Brand New Kind Of (2001)
- Vans Warped Tour 2002 Tour Compilation – Stage 1, track 17: Escape (2002)
- Under the Weather EP – Under the Weather (2003)
- Stop Living So Ugly – Acoustic Sampler (2004)
- Another Left Turn – Single (2015)
