= Ranma ½ season 4 =

Ranma ½
- Season 4
- Cover of the DVD box set by Viz.
- No. of episodes: 24

Release
- Original network: Fuji TV
- Original release: October 5, 1990 – March 29, 1991

Season chronology
- ← Previous; Season 3 Next → Season 5

This article lists the episodes and short summaries of the 46th to 69th and 72nd episodes of the Ranma ½ Nettōhen (らんま 1/2 熱闘編) anime series, known in the English dub as the fourth season of Ranma ½ or "Outta Control".

Rumiko Takahashi's manga series Ranma ½ was adapted into two anime series: Ranma ½ which ran on Fuji TV for 18 episodes and Ranma ½ Nettōhen which ran for 143. The first TV series was canceled due to low ratings in September 1989, but was then brought back in December as the much more popular and much longer-running Ranma ½ Nettōhen.

Viz Media licensed both anime for English dubs and labeled them as one. They released them in North America in seven DVD collections they call "seasons". Nettōhen episodes 46 to 69 (excluding 51) and 72 are season 4, which was given the title "Outta Control". Episode 51 was inserted as episode 63 of season 3 and episode 72 was inserted into this season as episode 88, while 70 and 71 are in season 5.

The opening theme is "No Way! Part 2" (絶対! Part 2, Zettai! Pāto Tsū) by Yoshie Hayasaka. The first closing theme up to episode 54 is "Present" (プレゼント, Purezento) by Tokyo Shōnen, and the second is "Friends" (フレンズ, Furenzu) by Yoko Takahashi, also known as YAWMIN. The English dub only uses "Friends" as a closing, "Present" was never actually heard in the English dub.

== Episode list ==
Note: Episode 51 was not included in Viz's season 4 release, but in season 3. It is shown below for proper chronological purposes.

No. overall	No. in season	Title	Original release date
46	65	"The Return of the Hawaiian Headmaster from Hell"; Transliteration: "Kaettekita Hentai Kōchō" (Japanese: 帰ってきた変態校長)	October 5, 1990
The headmaster of Furinkan High School, Principal Kuno, returns from Hawaii and immediately creates a new rule of forced haircuts for the boys and girls. However, if they can find the special coconut, then the rule will not be enforced.
47	66	"Enter Kuno, the Night-Prowling Knight"; Transliteration: "Tōjō! Shijō Saikyō ni Kunō" (Japanese: 登場!史上最強の九能)	October 12, 1990
Principal Kuno puts Tatewaki Kuno in charge of school discipline. Happosai offers to train Kuno, but is really using him to add to his underwear collection. However, Kuno's skills still increase and he challenges Ranma Saotome.
48	67	"Ranma Gets Weak!"; Transliteration: "Ranma ga Yowaku Nacchatta!" (Japanese: 乱馬が弱くなっちゃった!)	October 19, 1990
Happosai hits Ranma with an attack that takes away his strength, then informs everyone that Ranma is now vulnerable.
49	68	"Eureka! The Desperate Move of Desperation"; Transliteration: "Kansei! Tondemonai Hissatsuwaza" (Japanese: 完成!とんでもない必殺技)	October 26, 1990
Just as Ranma is about to give up, Cologne gives him hope in the form of the "Hiryu Shoten Ha" technique, a devastating technique he can learn and use even in his weakened state.
50	69	"Showdown! Can Ranma Make a Comeback?"; Transliteration: "Kessen! Ranma Fukkatsu Naru ka?" (Japanese: 決戦!乱馬復活なるか?)	November 2, 1990
Armed with the "Hiryu Shoten Ha" technique, Ranma goes after Happosai. But the old master, knowing something is up, keeps his temper, rendering the attack useless unless Ranma can figure out some way to get him really worked up.
51	63	"Ukyo's Skirt! The Great Girly-Girl Gambit"; Transliteration: "Ukyō no Sukāto Daisakusen" (Japanese: 右京のスカート大作戦!)	November 9, 1990
Ukyo starts to wear feminine clothes, thinking this will attract Ranma. Despite this, Ranma still sees her as a friend. When word comes out that Ranma and Ukyo are dating in the park, Akane, Kodachi, and Shampoo challenge Ukyo to a cook off.
52	70	"Here Comes Ranma's Mom!"; Transliteration: "Ranma no Mama ga Yattekita!" (Japanese: 乱馬のママがやってきた!)	November 16, 1990
A mysterious woman shows up at the Tendo dojo, having long conversations with Genma Saotome. Finding out that the woman is really his mother, Nodoka Saotome, Ranma may be asked to live with her.
53	71	"From Ryoga with Love"; Transliteration: "Ryōga, Ai to Kunō wo Koete" (Japanese: 良牙, 愛と苦悩を越えて)	November 23, 1990
Alone in a cabin in the woods, Ryoga Hibiki sits pondering the nature of his relationship with Akane Tendo.
54	72	"My Fiancé, the Cat"; Transliteration: "Fianse wa Bakeneko" (Japanese: フィアンセは化け猫)	November 30, 1990
Shampoo gives Ranma a large cat bell, as according to legend, the couple holding it and a smaller bell are destined to wed. Little does she know the large bell is haunted by a ghost cat seeking a bride.
55	73	"Blow, Wind! To Be Young is to Go Gung-Ho"; Transliteration: "Fukeyo Kaze! Seishun wa Nekketsuda" (Japanese: 吹けよ風!青春は熱血だ)	December 7, 1990
Principal Kuno hires a new teacher named Torajirou Higuma, who takes it upon himself to get Ranma and Akane to openly express their feelings towards each other while they are still young.
56	74	"A Formidable New Disciple Appears"; Transliteration: "Osorubeki Shindeshi Arawaru" (Japanese: 恐るべき新弟子現わる)	December 14, 1990
A young man named Genji Reita is awestruck when he sees Happosai in action, and seeks out the Tendo dojo, wishing to become a student of anything-goes martial arts. The master accepts, and it soon becomes apparent that he is a very dedicated pupil.
57	75	"Step Outside!"; Transliteration: "Omote ni Deyagare!" (Japanese: おもてに出やがれ!)	December 21, 1990
Off to the mountains to find a Christmas tree for Happosai, Ranma and Genma become separated. When Ranma and Akane go looking for Genma, they find him living in luxury as a panda, having been adopted by a rich woman as a playmate for her sickly son named Yutaro.
58	76	"Ryoga's "Tendo Dojo Houseguest" Diary"; Transliteration: "Ryōga no Tendō Dōjō Isōrō Nikki" (Japanese: 良牙の天道道場居候日記)	January 11, 1991
Ryoga decides to try to enroll at Furinkan High School, though first he has to pass the placement test. Akane agrees to tutor him, but with all the commotion that happens in the Tendo dojo on a regular basis, he struggles as he tries to manage to keep his mind on his studies.
59	77	"Happosai's Happy Heart!"; Transliteration: "Happōsai no Koi!" (Japanese: 八宝斉の恋!)	January 18, 1991
Happosai falls head over heels in love with the preschool teacher Midori, but he has to be willing to give up the underwear stealing for her sake.
60	78	"Extra, Extra! Kuno & Nabiki: Read All About It!"; Transliteration: "Kunō Bōzen! Koi no Daiyogen" (Japanese: 九能ボー然!恋の大予言)	January 25, 1991
Gendo, a fortune-telling friend of Sasuke, correctly predicts mishaps involving Kuno. Gendo later foretells Kuno will marry the first girl he sees. He is disappointed that the girl is neither Akane nor Ranma in female form, but rather it is Nabiki Tendo. While torn in abandoning his obsessions, Kuno starts to woo Nabiki for the sake of fate.
61	79	"Ryoga the Strong... Too Strong"; Transliteration: "Tsuyoku Narisugita Ryōga" (Japanese: 強くなりすぎた良牙)	February 1, 1991
After sharing his food with an old hermit, the man repays Ryoga by making him the strongest man in the world by applying the martial arts calligraphy technique. With the mark of the gods permanently etched onto Ryoga's stomach, he does his best to make the mark disappear by losing a match.
62	80	"Close Call! P-chan's Secret"; Transliteration: "Ayaushi! P-chan no Himitsu" (Japanese: あやうし!Pちゃんの秘密)	February 8, 1991
Terrified that Akane has figured out his identity as P-Chan, Ryoga tries to leave the town forever. Ranma continues to plot a way to beat Ryoga, while Akane interrogates him concerning the knowledge about the mark shared by Ryoga and P-Chan.
63	81	"The Egg-Catcher Man"; Transliteration: "Tamago wo Tsukamu Otoko" (Japanese: たまごをつかむ男)	February 15, 1991
Kasumi Tendo seems unusually cheerful after a chance encounter with a stranger, leading Nabiki to speculate that she's found herself a new boyfriend.
64	82	"Ranma and Kuno's... First Kiss"; Transliteration: "Ranma to Kunō no Hatsu Kisu?!" (Japanese: らんまと九能の初キッス?!)	February 22, 1991
Kuno obtains a magic sword capable of granting three wishes, thereby Ranma smells a cure for his curse. Kuno has fulfilled two of his wishes. Thus, Ranma must be willing to risk his own life in order to have the last wish.
65	83	"Shampoo's Red Thread of Dread!"; Transliteration: "Shanpū no Akai Ito" (Japanese: シャンプーの赤い糸)	March 1, 1991
Ranma suddenly falls head over heels for Shampoo when she ties him to her with the magical red thread of fate. It takes five hours for this effect to be permanent. Akane seems to ignore their bondage at first, but she later tries to stop the process before it is too late.
66	84	"Mousse Goes Home to the Country!"; Transliteration: "Mūsu Kokyō ni Kaeru" (Japanese: ムース故郷に帰る)	March 8, 1991
After betting it all on a final fight with Ranma, Mousse loses and is forced to give up on Shampoo and go home to China. But before he leaves, he is determined to make Shampoo happy by forcing Ranma to give up his other suitors.
67	85	"The Dumbest Bet in History!"; Transliteration: "Shijō Saite no Kake" (Japanese: 史上サイテーの賭け)	March 15, 1991
Because of a gambling debt Ranma made ten years ago in a game of Old Maid, the gambling king occupies the Tendo dojo. But Ranma, who, like the gambling king, is a bad gambler himself, manages to win back the dojo through the same game by the act of cheating.
68	86	"Kuno Becomes a Marianne!"; Transliteration: "Mariannu ni Natta Kunō" (Japanese: マリアンヌになった九能)	March 22, 1991
Azusa Shiratori takes home a tanuki statue, which contains a hidden Kuno. Azusa later adopts Kuno, who she believes is the tanuki, deeming him as Marianne. Another martial arts ice-skating battle ensues between Azusa versus Ranma and Akane, when it is suspected that Akane is there to take back Kuno away from Azusa.
69	87	"Ranma, You Are Such A Jerk!"; Transliteration: "Ranma Nanka Daikirai!" (Japanese: 乱馬なんか大キライ!)	March 29, 1991
Akane runs away after Ranma ruins her anniversary dinner, and the entire household has to spend the rest of the night looking for her.
