= Ranma ½ season 5 =

Season of television series

Ranma ½
- Season 5
- Cover of the DVD box set by Viz.
- No. of episodes: 25

Release
- Original network: Fuji TV
- Original release: April 5 – September 20, 1991

Season chronology
- ← Previous; Season 4 Next → Season 6

This article lists the episodes and short summaries of the 70th to 94th episodes of the Ranma ½ Nettōhen (らんま 1/2 熱闘編) anime series, known in the English dub as the fifth season of Ranma ½ or "Martial Mayhem".

Rumiko Takahashi's manga series Ranma ½ was adapted into two anime series: Ranma ½ which ran on Fuji TV for 18 episodes and Ranma ½ Nettōhen which ran for 143. The first TV series was canceled due to low ratings in September 1989, but was then brought back in December as the much more popular and much longer-running Ranma ½ Nettōhen.

Viz Media licensed both anime for English dubs and labeled them as one. They released them in North America in seven DVD collections they call "seasons". Nettōhen episodes 70 to 94 (excluding 72) are season 5, which was given the title "Martial Mayhem". Episode 72 was inserted as episode 88 in season 4.

The opening theme song is "Earth Orchestra" (地球オーケストラ, Chikyū Ōkesutora) by Kusu Kusu, while the closing theme is "Red Poppy" (ひなげし, Hinageshi) by Michiyo Nakajima.

== Episode list ==
Note Episode 72 was not included in Viz's season 5 release, but in season 4. It is shown below for proper chronological purposes.

| No. overall | No. in season | Title | Original release date |
|---|---|---|---|
| 70 | 89 | "Gimme That Pigtail"; Transliteration: "Sono Osage Moratta!" (Japanese: そのおさげもらったぁ!) | April 5, 1991 |
A group of four men head to Japan to look for a rare Chinese artifact called the Dragon's Whisker attached to a Japanese male with a pigtail hairstyle, as they later sought Ranma Saotome as the possessor of this artifact. Ranma is repeatedly attacked by the four, learning what they are after, thereby refusing to give it to them. Although they initially seem weak, they eventually are able to remove the artifact from his pigtail, causing another one of his curses to be released.
| 71 | 90 | "When a Guy's Pride and Joy is Gone"; Transliteration: "Otoko no Yabō ga Tsukiru Toki..." (Japanese: 男の野望が尽きる時...) | April 12, 1991 |
Without the Dragon's Whisker wrapped around Ranma's pigtail, his hair begins to grow at an extremely accelerated rate. After learning that the Dragon's Whisker can cure baldness in men, Genma Saotome and Happosai try to steal it for themselves.
| 72 | 88 | "Ling-Ling & Lung-Lung Strike Back!"; Transliteration: "Rinrin Ranran no Gyakushū" (Japanese: リンリン·ランランの逆襲) | April 19, 1991 |
Honorably bound to remain single until their big sister Shampoo marries, Ling-Ling & Lung-Lung return to Japan armed with an even deadlier technique, determined to eliminate all of Ranma's other fiancées.
| 73 | 91 | "Ryoga's Proposal"; Transliteration: "Ryōga no Puropōsu" (Japanese: 良牙のプロポーズ) | April 26, 1991 |
After being saved from a pack of wolves by Ryoga Hibiki, the ghost cat decides to repay the debt by possessing him & proposing to Akane Tendo. To make matters worse, the ghost cat decides that Akane should be his bride, much to Ranma's jealousy.
| 74 | 92 | "Genma Takes a Walk"; Transliteration: "Genma, Iede Suru" (Japanese: 玄馬, 家出する) | May 3, 1991 |
After a disagreement over the rules of shogi, tensions between Soun Tendo and Genma rise. This is until Genma decides to move out of the Tendo dojo, taking Ranma along with him.
| 75 | 93 | "The Gentle Art of Martial Tea Ceremony"; Transliteration: "Kore ga Kakutō Sadō de Omasu" (Japanese: これが格闘茶道でおます) | May 10, 1991 |
Ranma in female form is kidnapped by Sentaro Daimonji, a practitioner of the martial arts tea ceremony who is looking for a bride. To determine the bride's suitability, she has to defeat his grandmother, and as usual, Ranma is completely incapable of walking away from a challenge.
| 76 | 94 | "And the Challenger is... A Girl?!"; Transliteration: "Dōjō Yaburi wa Onna no Ko?" (Japanese: 道場破りは女の子?) | May 17, 1991 |
Temari Kaminarimon, a girl who uses martial arts based on old time toys, has beaten many dojos & taken their signboards, with Akane as her latest victim. Upon knowledge of this, Akane sees through Temari's technique & defeats her during their 2nd encounter.
| 77 | 95 | "Hot Springs Battle Royale!"; Transliteration: "Zekkyō! Onsen Batoru" (Japanese: 絶叫!温泉バトル) | May 24, 1991 |
A hot springs resort is having a big obstacle course race as a public relations gimmick, with the 1st prize being a trip to another resort of the contestant's choice. Seeing a chance to get back to the Jusenkyo hot springs, Ranma, Ryoga, Shampoo, and Mousse enter, unaware that the resort is trying their best to stop anyone from winning, since they are unable to pay within their budget.
| 78 | 96 | "Me is Kuno's Daddy, Me is" Transliteration: "Mī ga Kunō no Dadi Desu" (Japanese: ミーが九能のダディです) | May 31, 1991 |
When Principal Kuno starts going on about his long lost son, Sasuke Sarugakure starts to have his suspicions. Meanwhile, the school is turned into a war zone by the Principal Kuno's "get out of all school rules" class tournament fight.
| 79 | 97 | "The Matriarch Takes a Stand"; Transliteration: "Kakutō Sadō Iemoto Tatsu!" (Japanese: 格闘茶道·家元立つ!) | June 7, 1991 |
Sentaro needs Ranma's assistance once more, as his grandmother, the Daimonji matriarch, prepares to do something so dangerous, so unprecedented, that the result is sure to be catastrophic.
| 80 | 98 | "A Leotard is a Girl's Burden"; Transliteration: "Reotādo wa Otome no Noroi" (Japanese: レオタードは乙女の呪い) | June 14, 1991 |
A group of male gymnasts has just dispatched St. Hebereke's rhythmic gymnastics team including Kodachi Kuno, intent on uniting three legendary gymnastics tools. Now, the group is facing Ranma and Akane for the third of the treasures, kept by the gymnasts of Furinkan High School.
| 81 | 99 | "The Mixed-Bath Horror!"; Transliteration: "Kyōfu no Kon'yoku Onsen" (Japanese: 恐怖の混浴温泉) | June 21, 1991 |
An invitation takes the Tendos and Saotomes to a run-down hot-springs resort. The group is led to believe that this place happens to be haunted.
| 82 | 100 | "The Frogman's Curse!"; Transliteration: "Kaeru no Urami Harashimasu" (Japanese: カエルのうらみはらします) | June 28, 1991 |
A strange old man with a small army of pet frogs comes to town. Known as the frog hermit, a mysterious stranger with the ability to turn people into frogs, he sets his sight on Ranma.
| 83 | 101 | "Revenge! Raging Okonomiyaki...!"; Transliteration: "Gyakushū! Ikari no Okonomiyaki" (Japanese: 逆襲!怒りのお好み焼き) | July 5, 1991 |
When a crepes cook steals all her business, Ukyo Kuonji starts to doubt her prowess as an okonomiyaki chef. Under the guidance of a monk from the Temple of the Satisfied Stomach, she begins an intense training program, leaving Ranma and Akane to mind the store.
| 84 | 102 | "Ranma the Lady-Killer"; Transliteration: "Nanpa ni Natta Ranma" (Japanese: ナンパになった乱馬) | July 12, 1991 |
Under the influence of a magic love-potion bandage, Ranma starts to flirt with every girl in sight, whereas Shampoo & Ukyo are determined to use it to their advantage, much to Akane's chagrin.
| 85 | 103 | "Shogi Showdown"; Transliteration: "Kakutō Shogi wa Inochi Gake" (Japanese: 格闘将棋は命懸け) | July 19, 1991 |
A master of the mysterious martial arts of Battle Shogi seeks out Genma, demanding a rematch for the defeat that cost him the respect of his wife. When Genma cunningly wins again, the man decides to turn the entire lawn into a gigantic shogi board.
| 86 | 104 | "Sasuke's 'Mission: Improbable'"; Transliteration: "Sasuke no Supai Daisakusen" (Japanese: 佐助のスパイ大作戦) | July 26, 1991 |
Dissatisfied with Sasuke's performance as protector of the household, Tatewaki Kuno gives him a final chance to prove himself, as to arrange a date with Ranma in female form.
| 87 | 105 | "Bonjour, Furinkan!"; Transliteration: "Bonjūru de Gozaimasu" (Japanese: ボンジュールでございます) | August 2, 1991 |
A French nobleman named Picolet Chardin comes to Soun and Genma to collect on an old debt, demanding 1 of their daughters as a bride. Having been beaten by him at battle dining martial arts previously, Ranma volunteers, hoping for a chance to get even.
| 88 | 106 | "Dinner at Ringside!"; Transliteration: "Dinā wa Ringu no Uede" (Japanese: ディナーはリングの上で) | August 9, 1991 |
With the wedding date fast approaching, Ranma's only hope is to master the fearsome Parlay du Foie Gras and beat Picolet at battle dining martial arts.
| 89 | 107 | "Swimming with Psychos"; Transliteration: "Akane, Namida no Suiei Daitokkun" (Japanese: あかね, 涙の水泳大特訓) | August 16, 1991 |
Akane has been chosen as class representative in the upcoming swim meet, but many in her class are clueless of her inability to swim. So Principal Kuno gives his assistance using unorthodox methods.
| 90 | 108 | "Ryoga, Run Into the Sunset"; Transliteration: "Ryōga! Yūhi ni Mukatte Hashire" (Japanese: 良牙!夕日に向かって走れ) | August 23, 1991 |
While out on one of his journeys, Ryoga gets taken in by a farmer and his granddaughter Anna, convinced of him being the legendary hero named Joe, who has come to save them from the crooks that have been terrorizing the area.
| 91 | 109 | "Into the Darkness"; Transliteration: "Yume no Naka e" (Japanese: 夢の中へ) | August 30, 1991 |
Something strange is in the air, as each member of the Tendo household falls asleep one by one & enter a twisted dream world controlled by Happosai.
| 92 | 110 | "Nabiki, Ranma's New Fiancée!"; Transliteration: "Ranma wa Nabiki no Iinazuke?" (Japanese: 乱馬はなびきの許婚?) | September 6, 1991 |
Furious at both Ranma and Nabiki Tendo, Akane tells them to go marry each other. Much to her surprise, Nabiki decides to take her younger sister up on the offer.
| 93 | 111 | "Case of the Missing Takoyaki!"; Transliteration: "Tendo-ke Kieta Takoyaki no Nazo" (Japanese: 天道家消えたたこ焼きの謎) | September 13, 1991 |
In a classic whodunit style, everyone in the Tendo household tries to resolve who stole the takoyaki that Kasumi had just bought.
| 94 | 112 | "Ranma vs. Shadow Ranma!"; Transliteration: "Taiketsu! Ranma vs. Kage Ranma" (Japanese: 対決!乱馬vs.影乱馬) | September 20, 1991 |
Ranma buys a magical incense supposed to let him increase his skills by training against his own shadow. At first it works great, but then it becomes apparent that the shadow has a mind of its own.
