= Forbidden Meat =

Studio album by Sloppy Meateaters
- Released: January 1, 2001
- Recorded: Winter 2000/2001
- Studio: Ledbelly Studios (Canton, Georgia)
- Genre: Punk rock
- Length: 49:40
- Label: Orange Peal Records
- Producer: Sloppy Meateaters • The Robfather (exec.)

Sloppy Meateaters chronology
Shameless Self-Promotion (1999)	Forbidden Meat (2001)	Conditioned by the Laugh Track (2005)

Forbidden Meat is the second studio album by the American punk band Sloppy Meateaters. It was released by Orange Peal Records in 2001.

== Background ==
Forbidden Meat is the second album by the Sloppy Meateaters.

== Reception ==
PopMatters criticized the album's lack of originality, writing that it sounded similar to "other over-played “punk” groups on MTV", and described Chambers' voice as "whiny", but concluded that "you could do worse than Forbidden Meat." Alex Henderson of AllMusic gave the album a positive retrospective review, writing that "is funnier, more clever, and more memorable than what much of the competition had to offer in 2001."

The album was commercially successful in the United States and Japan.

== Track listing ==
1. Play the Game
2. Impossible
3. Lonely Day
4. Fat Chicks
5. Suddenly Forget
6. One Dream At A Time
7. Up Against Me
8. The Elevens
9. Give Me Something
10. Love Myself Better Than You
11. Things Are Gonna Change
12. Fresh Air
13. Talkin About Jesus
14. Who's Counting
15. So Long

== Personnel ==
Sloppy Meateaters

- Josh Chambers – vocals, guitar
- Kevin Highfield – drums
- John Elwell – bass, backing vocals

Production

- Produced by Sloppy Meateaters and Matt Washburn
- Executive Produced by Rob "The Robfather" Trisler
- Recorded, engineered, and mixed by Matt Washburn at Ledbelly Studio
- Mastered by John Cuniberti at The Plant Studios
- Art Direction, Design, and Illustrations by David Smith
- Photography by SME Photography
