= Conditioned by the Laugh Track =

Conditioned By The Laugh Track

Studio album by Sloppy Meateaters
- Released: May 17, 2005
- Recorded: October 1 – December 6, 2004
- Studio: Ledbelly Studios (Canton, Georgia)
- Genre: Alternative rock • punk rock • pop punk
- Length: 54:40
- Label: Orange Peal Records
- Producer: Matt Washburn • Sloppy Meateaters • The Robfather (exec.)

Sloppy Meateaters chronology
Forbidden Meat (2001)	Conditioned By The Laugh Track (2005)

Conditioned By The Laugh Track is the third and final studio album by the American punk rock band Sloppy Meateaters.

== Background ==
The band went on hiatus in 2003, following the departure of drummer Kevin Highfield. The album was recorded in 2004, after the band regrouped with Lee Howell replacing Highfield and Seth Smith joining as bassist.

== Reception ==
Punknews.org gave the album a positive review, describing it as an improvement over the band's previous two albums.

== Track listing ==
1. Drags and Squares
2. Alone and Wicked
3. The Ballad of Boo Radley (unwavering band of light)
4. Dallas
5. Serotonin
6. Daywalker
7. Napoleon
8. Stop (snake mountain)
9. So it Goes
10. Run Mary Run
11. Lusting Heavy (castle Greyskull)
12. Truth in Rations

== Personnel ==
Sloppy Meateaters

- Josh Chambers – vocals, guitar, acoustic guitar
- John Elwell – lead guitar, classical guitar, backing vocals
- Lee Howell – drums, percussion, backing vocals
- Seth Smith – bass, acoustic bass, standup bass, backing vocals

Additional Personnel

- Will Tallman – backing vocals
- Boo Radley – backing vocals
- Matt Washburn – backing vocals

Production

- Produced by Matt Washburn & Sloppy Meateaters
- Executive Produced by Rob "The Robfather" Trisler
- Recorded, engineered, and mixed by Matt Washburn at Ledbelly Studio
- Mastered by Howie Weinberg at Masterdisk
- Sequencing by Roger Lian
- Art direction and Illustrations by Michael Buchmiller
