= Ranma ½ season 7 =

Ranma ½
- Season 7
- Cover of the DVD box set by Viz.
- No. of episodes: 25

Release
- Original network: Fuji TV
- Original release: April 10 – September 25, 1992

Season chronology
- ← Previous; Season 6

This article lists the episodes and short summaries of the final 25 episodes (the 119th to the 143rd episodes) of the Ranma ½ Nettōhen (らんま 1/2 熱闘編) anime series, known in the English dub as the seventh and final season of Ranma ½ or "Ranma Forever".

Rumiko Takahashi's manga series Ranma ½ was adapted into two anime series: Ranma ½ which ran on Fuji TV for 18 episodes and Ranma ½ Nettōhen which ran for 143. The first TV series was canceled due to low ratings in September 1989, but was then brought back in December as the much more popular and much longer-running Ranma ½ Nettōhen. Correlating to the manga storylines, the anime adaptations, put together, go only as far as halfway into volume 22 (out of 38).

Viz Media licensed both anime for English dubs and labeled them as one. They released them in North America in seven DVD collections they call "seasons". Nettōhen episodes 119 to 143 are season 7, which was given the title "Ranma Forever".

The opening and closing theme songs are "Love Seeker (Can't Stop It)" (ラブ·シーカー~CAN’T STOP IT, Ravu Shīkā ~ Can't Stop It) by the band Vision and "Hill of the Rainbow and the Sun" (虹と太陽の丘, Niji to Taiyō no Oka) by Piyo Piyo.

== Episode list ==
No. overall	No. in season	Title	Original release date
119	137	"Tatewaki Kuno, Substitute Principal"; Transliteration: "Kunō Tatewaki, Dairi Kōchō wo Meizu" (Japanese: 九能帯刀, 代理校長を命ず)	April 10, 1992
Principal Kuno elects Tatewaki Kuno to be the substitute principal as a test of leadership while he is away on vacation. Kuno virtuously enforces strict laws on school grounds, issuing penalties to those who disobey these laws.
120	138	"Ranma's Greatest Challenge!?"; Transliteration: "Ranma, Tsukiyo ni Hoeru" (Japanese: 乱馬, 月夜に吠える)	April 17, 1992
Ranma Saotome prepares to conquer the Ogre Festival of the Dark, a tournament resembling that of kick the can, in which Happosai personally trains him for this special event. The anything-goes martial arts career is on the line as Ranma does his best not to forfeit. However, he is unaware what will be revealed if he were to succeed.
121	139	"Nihao! Jusenkyo Guide"; Transliteration: "Nihao! Jusenkyō no Gaido-san" (Japanese: 你好(ニーハオ)!呪泉郷のガイドさん)	April 24, 1992
The Jusenkyo Guide travels to Japan in order perform a ceremony which will tap the water table that is the source of the Spring of the Drowned Man. Ironically, the source of this spring is discovered in the pond directly outside the Tendo dojo. Unfortunately, the plan fails as the link to the source becomes disconnected. As a terrible result, everyone will have to wait one thousand years to have the spring working again.
122	140	"Pick-a-Peck o' Happosai"; Transliteration: "Meiwaku! Rokunin no Happōsai" (Japanese: 迷惑!六人の八宝斉)	May 1, 1992
Kasumi Tendo is given the occult tarot deck by Kuno. When Happosai is surrounded by the Seal of Solomon of the occult tarot deck, he is duplicated as six counterparts. They are vanquished when the occult tarot deck is kindled, reverting Happosai back to normal.
123 124	141 142	"From the Depths of Despair"; Transliteration: "Kibun Shidai no Hissatsuwaza" (Japanese: 気分しだいの必殺技)	May 8, 1992 May 15, 1992
Part 1: Ryoga Hibiki demonstrates the "Shishi Hōkōdan" technique on Ranma. It is then that Ranma tries to figure out the ki of this technique, in an attempt to counterattack. Part 2: To perfect the dangerous "Shishi Hōkōdan" technique, one must travel to the depths of despair. Ranma and Ryoga battle on school grounds, where the former struggles to find a flaw in the technique. It is revealed that the mastered technique emits a emptiness of ki, void of any emotion.
125	143	"Shampoo's Cursed Kiss"; Transliteration: "Shanpū Toraware no Kissu" (Japanese: シャンプー囚われのキッス)	May 22, 1992
Shampoo goes to a temple to deliver food, but is reluctant to see the ghost cat there. She is spellbound by the ghost cat to be trapped in the temple. She can be released only if Ranma will kiss her before midnight. However, if he fails to do so, Shampoo will be forced into wedlock, spending an eternity as a cat.
126	144	"Run Away With Me, Ranma!"; Transliteration: "Boku to Kakeochi Shite kudasai" (Japanese: ボクと駆け落ちして下さい)	May 29, 1992
Ranma experiences a recurring nightmare about encountering an old man named Harumaki in a field of blooming cherry blossoms, who has induced an out-of-body experience to search for his love interest Gyoko, to which Ranma in female form takes quite a resemblance. Ranma soon gets roped into dating Harumaki, in honor of his last dying wish before shuffling off this mortal coil.
127	145	"Let's Go to the Mushroom Temple"; Transliteration: "Kinoko Dera e Ikō" (Japanese: キノコ寺へ行こう)	June 5, 1992
Everyone is invited to visit the Mushroom Temple, a place of fungal training and mushroom dining. At dinnertime Ranma, as well as Akane Tendo, are the only ones not poisoned by the mushroom soup. However, the two have eaten mushrooms that enhance intimacy. While Ranma and Akane go out to find a remedial mushroom in a shrine atop a mountain, Ryoga, Kuno, and Mousse follow the two, hoping to cease their affection for each other.
128	146	"The Cradle from Hell"; Transliteration: "Hissatsu! Jigoku no Yurikago" (Japanese: 必殺!地獄のゆりかご)	June 12, 1992
After challenging Ranma to a match, Genma Saotome has verified his lack in training. The two go their separate ways to train on their own, preparing for a second match a week later. Ultimately, the father only wishes to embrace his son, recalling the childhood of the latter.
129	147	"Madame St. Paul's Cry for Help"; Transliteration: "Aoi Kyōfu ni Bonjūru" (Japanese: 青い恐怖にボンジュール)	June 19, 1992
A vat of forbidden, blue wine is having a strange effect on Picolet Chardin, the masterful monsieur of martial-arts dining, having characteristics of a vampire. Fearing for her charge, Madame St. Paul pleads for assistance, but later regrets in doing so.
130	148	"Meet You in the Milky Way"; Transliteration: "Orihime wa Nagareboshi ni Notte" (Japanese: 織姫は流れ星に乗って)	June 26, 1992
Tanabata, a Japanese star festival held on the seventh day of the seventh month, celebrates the celestial reunion of the Princess and the Cowherd. When the two descend from the sky, their story seems vaguely familiar to the correlating Chinese folklore story.
131	149	"Wretched Rice Cakes Of Love"; Transliteration: "Hitotsu Meshimase Koi no Sakuramochi" (Japanese: 一つ召しませ恋の桜餅)	July 3, 1992
Akane is given a recipe for making sakuramochi to test out the theory of a salesperson foretelling her destiny in matrimony. The mark of the cherry blossoms on the forehead signifies marriage, while the mark of the cross signifies divorce. Akane urges Ranma to taste one of the sakuramochi in order to find out.
132	150	"The Horrible Happo Mold-Burst"; Transliteration: "Dekita! Happō Dai Kabin" (Japanese: できた!八宝大カビン)	July 10, 1992
After the failure of the "Happo Daikarin" technique of explosions due to the heavy downpour, Happosai invents the "Happo Daikabin" technique, which releases clouds of paralytic mold. Ranma later trains with Shampoo and Cologne on the mountains, dodging a landslide of boulders that would represent the "Happo Daikabin" technique.
133	151	"The Kuno Sibling Scandal"; Transliteration: "Kunō Kyōdai Sukyandaru no Arashi" (Japanese: 九能兄妹スキャンダルの嵐)	July 17, 1992
Tatewaki Kuno and Kodachi Kuno are in sibling rivalry for their love interest. While Kuno is obsessed with Ranma in female form, Kodachi is infatuated with Ranma in male form. This scandal involves the solicitation of suggestive photographs of Ranma in female form.
134	152	"Battle for the Golden Tea Set"; Transliteration: "Ougon no Chaki, Gojōnotō no Kessen" (Japanese: 黄金の茶器, 五重塔の決戦)	July 24, 1992
Sentaro Daimonji returns in need of Ranma and Akane's aid. It is explained that an opponent is planning to steal the golden teapot of enishi, that of which the rival schools have fought over for generations. This procedure was to test the unity of the orthodox and unorthodox schools of martial arts tea ceremony.
135	153	"Gosunkugi's Summer Affair"; Transliteration: "Gosunkugi Hikaru, Hito Natsu no Koi" (Japanese: 五寸釘光, ひと夏の恋)	July 31, 1992
When Hikaru Gosunkugi meets Kogane Musashi for the first time, he instantly falls in love with her, later shamefully learning that she is a ghost. Furthermore, Kogane is forced to return to the underworld by midnight, leaving Gosunkugi heartbroken.
136 137	155 156	"Bring It On! Love as a Cheerleader"; Transliteration: "Ai no Kakutō Chiagāru" (Japanese: 愛の格闘チアガール)	August 7, 1992 August 14, 1992
Part 1: Ranma is challenged by Mariko Konjo, the captain of the Seisyun High School cheerleading squad, to a martial arts cheerleading competition, in which Kuno is collateral. Part 2: Ranma and Mariko are to compete in martial arts cheerleading during the kendo club tournament, all to win the affection of Kuno.
138	154	"Battle for Miss Beachside"; Transliteration: "Kettei! Misu Bīchisaido" (Japanese: 決定!ミス·ビーチサイド)	August 21, 1992
At the beach, Akane, Shampoo, and Ukyo Kuonji, want to cook a lunchtime meal for Ranma, so the three compete in a beauty contest to settle the conflict. Elsewhere, the ghost cat is seen chasing Tsubasa Kurenai to be his bride.
139	157	"The Musical Instruments of Destruction"; Transliteration: "Bakuretsu! Haipā Tsuzumi" (Japanese: 爆裂!ハイパーツヅミ)	August 28, 1992
Kuno and Kodachi come across the ancient tsuzumi (drum) and biwa (lute), respectively, both having devastating destructive power when played. Kuno showcases the weaponry of his drum, destroying much of the school and putting Principal Kuno in depression. Kodachi later offers Principal Kuno her biwa, allowing him to avenge his shattered ukulele.
140	158	"A Ninja's Dog is Black and White"; Transliteration: "Shinobi no Inu wa Shiro to Kuro" (Japanese: 忍の犬は白と黒)	September 4, 1992
Ryoga encounters Shirokuro, a black and white runaway ninja dog, who later takes a love letter Ryoga had written out of his backpack and delivers it to Akane. Akane, unknowing of the author, conjures a reply to the letter, for which Shirokuno delivers back. Her response explains that she is already in love with someone else, therefore unable to return her feelings. After realizing that his signature was not affixed in the first place, Ryoga trails away with Shirokuro, believing Akane is in love with him.
141	159	"The Tendo Dragon Legend"; Transliteration: "Tendō-ke: Ryūjin Densetsu" (Japanese: 天道家·龍神伝説)	September 11, 1992
Ranma and Akane discover a seahorse in the ground on their way back home, in which Ranma decides to use it as a class project. Concurrently, Kasumi Tendo invites Dr. Tofu Ono to the Tendo household due to a severe typhoon watch. Later on, they are visited by the frog hermit, who has an ulterior motive for showing up. Dr. Tofu realizes that the seahorse is actually a dragon. It is learned that the exposure to the whirlwind will increase the growth of the dragon and the consumption of dragon flesh will grant immortality.
142 143	160 161	"Boy Meets Mom"; Transliteration: "Ranma, Mītsu Mazā/Itsu no Hi ka, Kitto..." (Japanese: 乱馬, ミーツ·マザー/いつの日か, きっと...)	September 18, 1992 September 25, 1992
Part 1: Nodoka Saotome, Ranma's mother and Genma's wife, is planning to visit the Tendo household. It is revealed that Nodoka gave custody of Ranma to Genma. Genma promised her that he will raise Ranma to be a master of anything-goes martial arts. However, if he fails to do so, he and Ranma are to perform Seppuku, a form of Japanese ritual suicide by disembowelment. Ranma and Genma must stay in their cursed forms and hide their true identities from Nodoka. Part 2 ("Someday, Somehow..."): Nodoka is planning to leave the Tendo household the following morning. Akane schedules an appointment between Ranma and Nodoka to meet in the nearby park, and later in a restaurant. However, Genma intervenes and tries to prevent them from seeing each other. Nodoka walks towards a water main thereafter, in which it explodes, pushing her up into the sky. Ranma reluctantly saves her, while she is able to catch a glimpse of her son before she faints. When she awakens, she sees Ranma in female form, convinced that she was just dreaming. The episode wraps up with Ranma and Akane both saying "See ya!" to the home viewers.
