= Michiyo Nakajima =

Japanese voice actress

Michiyo Nakajima (中嶋 美智代, Nakajima Michiyo; born 2 January 1973 in Saitama Prefecture) is a Japanese actress, voice actress and former pop singer. Nakajima made her debut on 30 January 1991. Her final JPOP release was on 10 June 1998. She sang the ending theme for the animated (anime) version of Ranma ½, Season 5 (1991) - "Red Poppy" (Hinageshi). She also sang the opening and ending themes of Floral Magician Mary Bell (1992–93). The track 'Ano Subarashii Ai Wo Mou Ichido' from her 1992 Album 'Tanpopo' featured in the ending credits for Hideaki Anno's 1998 film Love & Pop. She played a role in the adventure game "Moon Cradle" released in 1995 for the Panasonic 3DO, which was later ported to the Sega Saturn in 1997.

== Discography ==
=== Singles ===
1. 30 January 1991: Akai Hanataba (赤い花束)
2. 17 April 1991: Hinageshi (ひなげし)
  - The ending theme of Ranma ½, TV Season 5
3. 17 July 1991: Hatsukoi-Dōri (初恋通り)
4. 21 September 1991: Totemo Chiisana Monogatari (とても小さな物語)
5. 29 January 1992: Omoide ni mo Narenai (思い出にもなれない)
  - The first ending theme of Floral Magician Mary Bell
  - Coupled with Kitto Dekiru ne! (きっと出来るね！)—the opening theme of Floral Magician Mary Bell
6. 21 May 1992: Nikki no Kagi Kashimasu (日記の鍵貸します)
7. 18 September 1992: Omowareteiru (思われている)
  - The second ending theme of Floral Magician Mary Bell
8. 21 January 1993: Hazukashii Yume (恥ずかしい夢)
9. 21 May 1993: Chotto Itai Kankei (ちょっと痛い関係)
10. 21 October 1993: Oteyawaraka ni (お手やわらかに)
11. 21 July 1994: Koi o Shimashō (恋をしましょう)
12. 10 June 1998: 1, 2, 3, Kimemasho (1･2･3キメましょ)

=== Albums ===
1. 5 June 1991: Nakajima (中嶋) (PCCA-00274)
2. 22 November 1991: Kinenbi (記念日。) (mini-album) (PCCA-00316)
3. 1 July 1992: Tampopo (Tanpopo, たんぽぽ) (PCCA-00379)
4. 20 November 1992: Hijōshikina Wani (非常識なワニ) (PCCA-00408)
5. 3 March 1993: Nakajima Michiyo BEST Stay with me (中嶋美智代ベスト Stay with me) ("Best Album") (PCCA-00435)
6. 16 December 1994: PRIVATE SELECTION I'll be there (中嶋美智代プライベート・セレクション I'll be there) ("Best Album") (PCCA-00708)
7. November 21, 1996: Nakajima Michiyo BEST Believe in you (中嶋美智代ベスト Believe in you) ("Best Album") (PCCA-01026)
