= Out of Control =

Out of Control may refer to:

== Books ==
- Out of Control (Kelly book), a 1994 book by Kevin Kelly about technology and economics
- Out of Control (Nancy Drew/Hardy Boys), a 1997 Nancy Drew and Hardy Boys novel
- Out of Control, a 2004 true-crime book by Steven Long about the murder of David Lynn Harris

== Film and television ==
=== Film ===
- Out of Control (1985 film), an American-Yugoslav action drama
- Out of Control, a 1992 Disney live-action short
- Over the Line (1993 film), also released as Out of Control, an American thriller
- Out of Control, a 1998 film starring Tom Conti and Sean Young
- Out of Control (2002 film), a British television film by Dominic Savage
- Out of Control, a 2009 TV film featuring Laura Vandervoort
- Out of Control (2003 film), an Indian Hindi-language romantic comedy
- Out of Control (2017 film), a German-Chinese thriller

=== Television ===
- Out of Control (TV series), a 1984–1985 Nickelodeon comedy series
- Out of Control (2013 TV program), a Filipino documentary show
- "Out of Control" (Doctors), a 2004 episode
- "Out of Control" (The Flash), a 1990 episode
- "Out of Control" (Law & Order), a 1991 episode
- "Out of Control" (Mayday), a 2005 episode
- "Out of Control" (Shameless), a 2010 episode
- "Out of Control" (That's So Raven), a 2003 episode

== Music ==
=== Albums ===
- Out of Control (Anti-Nowhere League album) or the title song, 2000
- Out of Control (Girls Aloud album), 2008
  - Out of Control Tour, a 2009 concert tour by Girls Aloud
  - Out of Control: Live from the O2 2009, by Girls Aloud, 2009
- Out of Control (Peter Criss album) or the title song, 1980
- Out of Control (Ted Nugent album), 1993

=== Songs ===
- "Out of Control" (The Chemical Brothers song), 1999
- "Out of Control" (George Jones song), 1960
- "Out of Control" (Hoobastank song), 2003
- "Out of Control" (Kids in the Kitchen song), 1986
- "Out of Control" (Nothing's Carved in Stone song), 2013
- "Out of Control" (Tuesday Knight song), 1987
- "Out of Control" (U2 song), 1979
- "Out of Control (Back for More)", by Darude, 2001
- "Out of Control", by Battle Beast from Battle Beast, 2013
- "Out of Control", by B'z from Run, 1992
- "Out of Control", by Blutengel from Nachtbringer, 2011
- "Out of Control", by the Eagles from Desperado, 1973
- "Out of Control", by Krokus from The Blitz, 1984
- "Out of Control", by Nantucket from Nantucket V, 1984
- "Out of Control", by Praga Khan, 1989
- "Out of Control", by Ric Ocasek from Beatitude, 1983
- "Out of Control", by the Rolling Stones from Bridges to Babylon, 1997
- "Out of Control", by She Wants Revenge from She Wants Revenge, 2006
- "Out of Control", by Squeeze from Squeeze, 1978
- "Out of Control", by Ted Nugent from Cat Scratch Fever, 1977
- "Out of Control (State of Emotion)", by Keena from Make Sure They See My Face, 2007

== See also ==
- Outta Control (disambiguation)
- Nelson rules, in control theory, identify when a measured variable is out of control
