= Michiru Sasano =

Japanese singer (born 1967)

Michiru Sasano 笹野 みちる
- Born: October 30, 1967 (age 58); Kyoto, Japan
- Genres: J-pop
- Occupation: Singer-songwriter
- Instruments: Guitar and vocals
- Years active: 1988–present
- Label: Victor Entertainment
- Website: sasanomichiru.net

Michiru Sasano (笹野 みちる, Sasano Michiru) is a Japanese musician, pop singer and songwriter. In 1988, when she was attending college in Doshisha University.

A pop band Tokyo Shōnen was formed in which she became the songwriter and vocalist. She later came out as a lesbian. After the band broke up, she became a solo artist in 1993.
