= Shameless Self-Promotion =

Studio album by Sloppy Meateaters
- Released: December 1999 (Self-released) May 2000 (Orange Peal)
- Recorded: October 1999
- Studio: Ledbelly Studios (Canton, Georgia)
- Genre: Punk rock
- Length: 32:57
- Label: Orange Peal Records
- Producer: Josh Chambers

Sloppy Meateaters chronology
Eat Meat Cuz It's Fun Demo (1998)	Shameless Self-Promotion (1999)	Forbidden Meat (2001)

Shameless Self-Promotion is the debut studio album by American punk rock band Sloppy Meateaters. The album contained the two original members of the band Josh Chambers and drummer Kevin Highfield. Although only two band members were recorded on the album, the cover of the re-released album contained Travis Gerke who joined the band after the original release.

== Track listing ==
1. Another Friend
2. Home
3. I Sing Like a Girl
4. Explore the Obvious
5. A Dumb Guy in a Stupid Band
6. Mom
7. My Secret Killer
8. Outta Control
9. What Did We Learn Today?
10. Nobody Likes Me
11. Hang On to Me
12. Shonka Tonk
13. Love**

== Personnel ==
Sloppy Meateaters

- Josh Chambers – vocals, guitar, bass
- Kevin Highfield – drums

Production

- Recorded by Matt Washburn at Ledbelly Studio
- Art direction by Alexis Adams and David Smith
- Executive Producer and A&R: Rob "The Robfather" Trisler (2000 Orange Peal re-release)
