= Tokyo Shōnen =

Japanese rock band

Tokyo Shōnen 東京少年
- Origin: Kyoto, Japan
- Genres: Pop rock, new wave
- Years active: 1988–1991
- Labels: Victor Entertainment
- Past members: Michiru Sasano; Katsuhito Teshirogi; Hideo Nakamura; Akira Minakami

Tokyo Shōnen (東京少年, Tōkyō Shōnen) was a Japanese rock band, active from 1988 to 1991.

== Members ==
Sasano is female. All other members are male.

- Michiru Sasano (笹野 みちる, Sasano Michiru): Vocals
- Katsuhito Teshirogi (手代木 克仁, Teshirogi Katsuhito), also known as Tesshii (Tesshī): Guitar
- Hideo Nakamura (中村 英夫, Nakamura Hideo) also known as Kometarō Nakamura (中村コメタロー, Nakamura Kometarō): Bass
- Akira Minakami (水上 聡, Minakami Akira): Keyboard

== Biography ==
Despite the name, which literally means "Tokyo Boys", the band was founded in 1988 by Sasano, when she was still a student at Doshisha University in Kyoto. Sasano wrote all the lyrics and initially composed all the songs, though other members composed later songs. Their songs were often treated as a sort of idol-style girl pop. However, the band was heavily influenced by new wave music bands, such as U2 and XTC. They released their debut album on November 21, 1988. Over the years, they released five albums, two best-of-compilations, and seven singles. After the release of their final album on August 21, 1991, the band dissolved. The former members are still active in the music industry.

== Discography ==
=== Singles ===
- High School Days (ハイスクール・デイズ, Hai Sukūru Deizu) (January 21, 1989)
- Hari to Puzzle (針とパズル, Hari to Pazuru; "Needle and Puzzle") (May 21, 1989)
- Kimi no Uta ni Boku o Nosete (君の歌に僕をのせて; "I Let Myself Be Upon Your Song") (June 21, 1990)
- Present (プレゼント, Purezento) (August 21, 1990)
- Shy Shy Japanese (Shai Shai Japanīzu) (November 7, 1990)
- Harmony (Hāmonī) (April 21, 1991)
- Silent Möbius ~Sailing (サイレントメビウス ～Sailing, Sairento Mebiusu ~Seiringu) (July 21, 1991)

=== Albums ===
- Tokyo Shōnen (東京少年, Tōkyō Shōnen; "Tokyo Boys") (November 21, 1988)
- Harappa no Mannaka de (原っぱの真ん中で; "In the Middle of the Field") (June 7, 1989)
- Hi no Ataru Sakamichi de (陽のあたる坂道で; "On the Slope In the Sun") (March 7, 1990. Mini album)
- Bokura o Sagashi ni (僕等をさがしに; "Searching for Us") (July 21, 1990)
- Mō Ii Kai? (も～いいかい?; "Are You Ready?") (December 16, 1990 . Best album)
- Kaeri-michi (帰り道; "Return Road") (August 21, 1991)
- Yubikiri Genman (ゆびきりげんまん; "Pinky Swear") (December 16, 1991. Best album)

=== Videos ===
All videos were shot by Shunji Iwai.

- Getting Home (Gettingu Hōmu) (1991)
- Hi no Ataru Sakamichi de (1991)
- Love you, So long (Rabu yū, Sō Rongu) (1991)

=== Tie-in songs ===
- Tobikiri no Asa (トビキリの朝, "Wonderful Morning"), used for the television advertisement of Tokyo Mode Gakuen.
- Kimi no Uta ni Boku o Nosete, used for the TBS dorama Dramatic 22 theme song.
- Present, used for the Fuji TV anime Ranma ½ Nettōhen closing song.
- Shy Shy Japanese, used for the television advertisement of Alpen ski store.
- Silent Möbius ~Sailing, used for the anime movie Silent Möbius The Motion Picture theme song.
