= Etsuko Nishio =

Japanese actress, singer and model

Etsuko Nishio 西尾 悦子
- Born: March 9, 1973 (age 53); Toyota, Aichi, Japan
- Genre: Japanese pop
- Occupation: Singer
- Years active: 1988–1998

Etsuko Nishio (西尾 悦子, Nishio Etsuko; born March 9, 1973, in Toyota, Aichi, Japan) is a Japanese singer, actress and model, known for her songs Ja Ja Uma ni Sasenaide and Don't mind Lay Lay Boy from the Ranma ½ anime. In 1992 she became a gravure idol, releasing several nude photobooks and videos. She also starred in a couple feature films.

== Music ==
- Ja Ja Uma ni Sasenaide (Don't Make Me a Shrew; also known as "Don't Make Me Wild Like You")
- Don't mind Lay Lay Boy (Don't Mind China Boy)

== Photobooks ==
- Illusion (1992)
- Charm (1992)
- Finger (1994)
- DayDream (1995)
- Theatre Named Desire (欲望という名の劇場, 1996)
- Movement 1 (2003)
