= List of Flame of Recca characters =

This is the list of characters that have appeared in Flame of Recca. This list is heavily based on the manga, but relevant information based on the anime series are also noted.

== Main characters ==
=== Team Hokage ===
Recca Hanabishi (花菱 烈火, Hanabishi Rekka)
Voiced by: Kōsuke Okano (Japanese); Scott Roberts (English)
Recca (Japanese for "blazing fire" or "furious flame") is a teenager obsessed with ninjas and anything related to ninjas. Recca was born the second son of Ōka, the leader of the Hokage ninja clan that existed over 400 years ago. Recca's older half-brother, Kurei, was supposed to be the heir to the leadership because he was the eldest and was born with the ability to control fire, but Recca also exhibited the same abilities as an infant, and is declared the true heir of the Hokage leadership. In an attempt to save him during the slaughter of the Hokage ninja clan, his mother (Kagerō) used a forbidden technique that opened a portal that would transport him into the future, where the Flame of Recca storyline begins.
Recca's flame power is derived from eight Flame Dragons named Saiha, Nadare, Homura, Setsuna, Madoka, Rui, Kokuu, and Resshin. Recca's powers were apparently so strong that they had to be sealed with a wrist guard. In the end, the eighth dragon Resshin (actually Recca's father Ōka) reveals that Recca's flame has no original form (something every Flame Master's flame is supposed to have, such as Ōka's and Kurei's phoenix flame), thus Recca is the true cursed child, fated to end the Hokage. Ōka reveals that if Recca becomes the ninth dragon, he would become "a stupid, useless dragon with no ability whatsoever, a waste of space inside Kurei". After the destruction of the Tendo Jigoku, every remaining madogu disintegrated to naught, as well as Recca and Kurei's flame powers.
His appearance varies slightly between the anime and manga, as in the manga, his hair has a red highlight and bright blue eyes, and in the anime his hair is a dull blue highlight and his eyes are a similar color.
Yanagi Sakoshita (佐古下 柳, Sakoshita Yanagi)
Voiced by: Yuki Masuda (Japanese); Carol-Anne Day (English)
Yanagi is a teenage girl gifted with the innate ability to heal any kind of physical injury, and Recca immediately offers to serve her as her loyal ninja after seeing her compassion when she healed a severely injured puppy in a local park (in the anime series, she heals Recca after a pile of metal pipes collapsed on top of him). She is the prime objective of the series' main antagonist, Kōran Mori, as he believes that her healing powers will help him attain eternal life.
In the manga, it is revealed that she is the reincarnation of Sakura-hime (Princess Sakura), the daughter of Oyakata and princess of Sawaki clan, who lived over 400 years before the series' actual storyline.
Fūko Kirisawa (霧沢風子, Kirisawa Fūko)
Voiced by: Akiko Hiramatsu (Japanese); Onalea Gilbertson (English), Caitlynne Medrek (English; young Fūko)
Fūko, a tomboyish teenage girl, is Recca's best friend who has always aspired to defeat him in battle so that he would serve her as her ninja. She initially gets irritated by the fact that Recca chose to become Yanagi's ninja just because he wanted to. For this reason, she decides to accept the aid of Kagerō, who offers to lend her a powerful madōgu that controls wind called Fūjin (風神) in order to enable her to defeat Recca. In actuality, Kagerō implanted a stone in the Fūjin that allowed her to brainwash Fūko, but Recca manages to defeat Fūko and destroy the sphere. Fūko ends up being friends with both Yanagi and Recca after the incident, and she also keeps the Fūjin and wields it throughout the rest of the series.
Fūko is often described as tomboyish by other characters, and is often laughed at or teased when she shows or says something sensitive or feminine. Fūko greatly respects human life, and hates those who take it for granted. This characteristic is shown on several occasions, the first being when one of her opponents, Fujimaru, states that he would do anything and kill anyone - even women and children - to achieve victory.
Fūko's character design varies in the adaptations of the series. While she has brown hair and green eyes in the manga and both of the Flame of Recca video games, she has red violet hair and blue eyes in the anime series.
Domon Ishijima (石島 土門, Ishijima Domon)
Voiced by: Nobuo Tobita (Japanese); Adam Hunter (English)
Domon is Recca's schoolmate who is known for his prowess in physical strength and in fighting (he is referred to as Ogre (鬼, Oni) by other students that he has defeated in fights). Like Fūko, he has always wanted to defeat Recca, and the reason behind this is that Fūko told him that he could only challenge her if he manages to defeat Recca. He is unable to defeat Recca despite his numerous attempts, and he eventually aids the latter in defeating and rescuing Fūko when she is brainwashed by Kage Hōshi. Afterward, both he and Fūko join forces with Recca and remain allied with him throughout the rest of the series. Domon wields the Dosei no Wa (土星の輪; "The Ring of Saturn"), a madogu which enhances his physical strength. Later in the series, he also wields the Kuchibashi-Ō (嘴王; "Beak King"), a super-sharp snapping claw on an extendable chain, and the Tetsugan (鉄丸; "Iron Ball"), which transmutes his entire body into a living iron golem for brief periods.
Domon is depicted as someone who is physically strong, but intellectually inept. Another of his assets is his strong will-power, which is recognized even by one of the series' antagonists, Kurei, after Domon manages to thwart Noroi's efforts to erase his memories due to his will-power. It is openly shown that Domon is interested in Fūko romantically, although he is prone to getting attracted to other women as well.
Tokiya Mikagami (水鏡 凍季也, Mikagami Tokiya)
Voiced by: Hikaru Midorikawa (Japanese); Paul Hunter (English), Mayumi Asano (Japanese: young Tokiya)
Tokiya is a second year student at Nashikiri High School, and he wields the madōgu Ensui (閻水; "Dark Water"), a sword that utilizes water to create its blade and is capable of creating and controlling all three states of water (liquid, solid and gas). He is often referred to as by his last name, though his companions have made up nicknames for him, such as "Mi-chan" or "Mī-bō". He uses the Hyōmon Ken style which was developed specifically for the Ensui and the Hyōma En (a madogu that also controls water, but focuses more on water in its solid form). He joins forces with Recca in attempting to rescue her from Mori Kōran's mansion, and he continues to be part of their team throughout the rest of the series.
Tokiya in both the anime and manga is initially portrayed as callous and aloof; often insulting his teammates' abilities and intelligence. He wanted to take Yanagi away from Recca because she looks exactly like his sister, Mifuyu Mikagami, who was murdered in front of his eyes when he was young. Tokiya is protective of Yanagi, and he is shown to be interested in her romantically in the manga. Other characters have often praise Tokiya for his intellect and composure during battle, with some going as far as to say that he might be the strongest Hokage member when it comes to normal battles. Another characteristic of his that makes him stand out among his teammates is the fact that he is more ruthless and cruel than the rest, a fact recognized by both Kurei and Mikoto, who both act as antagonists throughout most of the manga.
Certain characteristics in Tokiya's personality and appearance are different in the anime series as opposed to the manga and games. His hair is light blue in the manga and games, and brown in the anime series. In the booklet accompanying the Flame of Recca Original Soundtrack Vol. 2 CD, his age is listed as 17, while the filler page in the manga states that he is 16 years of age. Apart from these differences, Tokiya's character development in the anime is not as obvious as it is in the manga, wherein he becomes more open to emotions other than his desire for vengeance towards the end of the series. Tokiya attributes this change to his encounter with Kai, a fellow Hyōmon Ken practitioner, and his friends.
Kaoru Koganei (小金井 薰, Koganei Kaoru)
Voiced by: Motoko Kumai (Japanese); Brett Bauer (English)
Kaoru was once a member of Kurei's Uruha, but later, he becomes a member of Recca's team in the Ura Butō Satsujin. He wields the Kōgan Anki (鋼金暗器), a puzzle-like weapon that has five different forms. In the manga, the weapon also has a mysterious sixth form: "Mu" (Nothing).
Little is known of his early life, but given that in a manga flashback Kaoru was seen attempting to commit suicide, it can be assumed he was a lonely child until he met Kurei. He is the youngest member of Hokage, and as such, his personality reflects his age. Even in battle, Kaoru is playful, and sometimes has a tendency to toy with his opponents as if the battle were a game.
In the manga and video game, Koganei has blue hair and blue eyes. He wears a white T-shirt with a vest over it, as well as shorts and sneakers. He wears different sorts of street clothes throughout the rest of the manga. Under a bandanna he wears tied around his right wrist is a suicide scar. In the anime, he has brown hair and eyes, he wears a necklace with the similar color to Kogun Anki, and an attire similar to the manga and game.
Kage Hōshi (影子, Kage Hōshi)
Voiced by: Kotono Mitsuishi (Japanese); Mariette Sluyter (English)
Kage Hōshi, whose real name is Kagerō (陽炎), is the first antagonist of the series, and is later revealed to be Recca's mother. She possesses the madōgu Eikai Kyoku (影界玉; "Shadow Ball"), which allows her to teleport through shadows, show people the past, and perform acts of scrying. Later in the series she is also seen wielding a Shikigami (式髪; "hair") and the madogu Hokishin (砲鬼神). She performed a technique called Jikūryūri (a technique which allows the user to travel or send another person to a different time) to save the infant Recca from being killed along with the rest of the Hokage clan. The technique, however curses the user with immortality.

== Villains ==
Kurei (紅麗, Kurei)
Voiced by: Ryotaro Okiayu (Japanese); Jonathan Love (English)
Kurei is Recca's older half brother and Archenemy. He was born in 1571 (four years prior to Recca's birth), and is the firstborn son of Flame Master Ōka and his mistress Reina. He was initially recognized as the next leader of the Hokage clan due to his innate flame powers, but the Hokage elders label him as a cursed child when his younger half-brother, Recca Hanabishi, also exhibits the same powers. Kurei was supposed to be killed in order to save the clan, but due to Kagerō's intervention, Kurei and his mother are exiled instead. Kurei then eventually attempts to kill Recca, and ends up imprisoned for his crime. He eventually escapes the prison when it is destroyed during Oda Nobunaga's raid on the Hokage village, and he jumps into the time portal Kagerō opened in order to save Recca by sending him into the future.
Kurei is then found and adopted by Tsukino Mori, the wife of one of the series' main antagonists, Kōran Mori. Kōran raises Kurei to become a "machine", repeatedly telling him that he does not need human emotions and that he should just throw them away. Upon seeing how much Kurei loved his mother, Kōran has her transferred to a different house and keeps her under house arrest. When Kurei ends up falling in love with Kurenai, Kōran Mori's adopted daughter, Kōran has her killed. This causes Kurei to despise his adoptive father, but since Kōran is holding his mother hostage, he obeys Kōran's orders.
Kurei is the leader of the Uruha, a group of skilled warriors hired to serve Kōran Mori and to assist Kurei in missions that Kōran orders him to undertake.
Like his father and his half-brother, Kurei has the innate power to produce and manipulate fire. The main form of his flame is the Phoenix (不死鳥, Fushichō), and is shown to be of a different color compared to Recca's. Kurei has the ability to absorb souls into his flame, and use them to produce humanoid flames that fight for him and obey his commands. The first time Kurei absorbed a soul into his flame was when he absorbed Kurenai's soul right after Kōran killed her. The second instance of this was when he absorbed the soul of a loyal member of the Uruha named Jisho. His power is not limited to absorbing just one soul at a time, as shown by his absorption of several souls after an opponent slaughters many men in the latter part of the manga.
Kurei is also capable of executing non-flame based techniques such as Wakemi, a technique that allows him to produce multiple, solid duplicates of himself that possess his powers and skills. In the last part of the manga, he is shown to be able to use the Jikuryūri, a technique that allows its user to open a portal in time.
Koran Mori (森 光蘭, Kōran Mori)
Voiced by: Rokuro Naya (Japanese); Mike Shepherd (English)
Mori is the main antagonist of the series with a resemblance to Frankenstein's monster. He is Kurei's adoptive father, and he trained Kurei to suppress his emotions and become his killing machine. He is extremely rich, and longs for eternal life so he can fully enjoy all his money. He sets up advanced cloning labs and wants to get his hands on Yanagi because he believes that her healing powers can help him achieve eternal life. In the manga, he eventually finds out about and obtains the madōgu Tendō Jigoku, which is said to be able to grant its wielder eternal life.
Renge (煉華)
Renge is a clone produced in Mori's lab using Kurei's and Kurenai's genes. Her personality is of a naive little girl, and thus she follows Mori Kōran's orders without question because she sees him as her "papa." Among all the clones they created, Renge is the only one considered to be successful because she is the only clone that developed flame powers. She is eventually defeated and humiliated by Kurei, terrifying her and making her run to Mori for protection. Mori, who had then fused with the Tendō Jigoku, betrays her and kills her through allowing the Tendō Jigoku to devour her in order to absorb her flame powers.

=== Uruha ===
The Uruha is a group of composed of skilled warriors hired to protect and assist Kurei in his missions. The Uruha is divided into several smaller groups, and some of them are more loyal to and/or exclusively serve Mori Kōran while the others remain loyal to Kurei.

Mokuren Nagai (永井 木蓮, Nakai Mokuren)
Voiced by: Daiki Nakamura (Japanese); Byron Close (English)
Mokuren is a sadistic and perverted man who was once partners with Koganei and wields the madōgu Kodama, which allows him to control plants. Mokuren enjoys torturing people, especially women. After being defeated by Recca at Mori's mansion, he developed a strong hatred for him. Genjuro healed Mokuren and made him more powerful by implanting the Kodama within him using psychic surgery. Mokuren eventually becomes part of the Uruha Maboroshī, and is defeated by Tokiya during the Ura Butō Satsujin. He has a relationship with Mikoto, but he betrays her love because of his intense hatred for Recca.
Reiran Katashiro (形代 零蘭, Katashiro Reiran)
Voiced by: Yuri Amano (Japanese); Jennifer Holder (English)
Ganko's first doll animated by the madōgu Kata Kugutsu, who bears a strong resemblance to her mother. When Fūko fought her in Kurei's mansion, she is thought to be a real person while Ganko pretended to be a doll (using the alias Primera). In the manga, Fūko salvages the doll from the Mori mansion's rubble and brings it to her home (where Ganko resides), and Reiran is reanimated.
Sekiō (石王)
Voiced by: Shigezō Sasaoka (Japanese); Tommy James (English)
A giant who uses the madōgu Sekichū, which grants him the power to control stones. After being initially defeated by Domon, Kurei decapitates him and presents his head to the Hokage. He is also the younger brother of Gaō, who eventually seeks revenge for his brother's death. In the anime, he is a 200-year-old being whose perfectly capable of speech.
Kuchibashimaru (嘴丸), Tsumemaru (爪丸), Hanemaru (羽丸)
Voiced by: Wataru Takagi, Hisao Egawa, Takumi Yamazaki
Three are low-leveled Uruha fighters who attacked the Hokage during their visit to Kagerō's house. Each uses a madōgu derived from their own names (the Kuchibashi-Ō, the Oni no Tsume and the Hizanu, respectively). They are said to be incapable of utilizing 10% of their madōgu's powers, and are defeated by the Hokage. After their defeat, Fūko and Domon take their madōgu and learn how to use them. They make a final appearance in the final arc of the manga, wherein they act as the bodyguards of Tsukino Mori.
J-Keeper (Jキーパー, Jei-Kīpā)
A manga-only character, J-Keeper is a gigantic armored warrior initially believed to be a member of the Jūshinshu who fights with a giant mace. He killed Magensha on orders from Kurei, and later attacked Koganei and Saicho. When Joker intervened, he suggested a team-up only to betray and critically injure Saicho. Joker then easily stopped one of J-Keeper's attacks and cut him to pieces, saying J-Keeper is nothing more than a placeholder for the real member of the Jūshinshu: Joker himself.

==== Uruha Jūshinshu ====
The Jūshinshu is composed of the ten strongest warriors in the Uruha. Most of the members of the Jūshinshu competed in the Ura Butō Satsujin as captains of different subdivisions of the Uruha. Kurei's team, Uruha Kurenai (Uruha Scarlet), consists of four members of the Jūshinshu, and they were the undisputed champions of the Ura Butō Satsujin for three years.

==== Uruha Maboroshii (Uruha Illusion) ====
Genjurō (幻獣朗)
Voiced by: Tamio Ōki (Japanese); Steve Olson (English)
Captain of Uruha Maboroshii and wields a madōgu called Mugen, which allows him to shrink objects by affecting its cellular structure. Genjuro has the innate ability to do psychic surgery and is also a master of illusion techniques such as the wakemi. In the anime, he is killed by Neon after being defeated by Recca. In the manga, Neon kills one of his illusions and Genjuro escapes; eventually allying himself with Kōran Mori and helping Mori complete his cloning experiments which results the creation of Aoi and Renge. Genjuro is put in charge in one of the fortresses of SODOM City, in which he encounters Neon again. He overwhelms her with his robots at first, but panics when he sees Domon Ishijima ally himself with Neon and her sisters. While Genjuro attempts to retreat, Neon catches up with him and kills him for good using Jisho's madōgu.
Menō Sakura (砂倉 瑪瑙, Sakura Menō)
Voiced by: Yuko Minaguchi (Japanese); Katie Rowan (English)
Menō is a young girl whose father served as one of Genjuro's lab assistants. Genjuro believed that her hair was of superior quality, making her the perfect candidate for infusion with the Shikigami, a madōgu that controls hair. Her father opposed the plan, but Genjuro uses his madōgu to shrink him and use him as a hostage to make Menō allow the surgery. After Recca defeats her and rescues her father, she eventually befriends Yanagi and seems to understand Joker.
Shijū (獅獣)
Shiju is an experimental result of Genjuro's twisted experiments that is labeled a chimera, and eats all the opponents he defeats. He is defeated by Koganei.

==== Uruha Kurogane (Uruha Iron) ====
Jisho (磁生)
Captain of Uruha Kurogane and wields a set of madōgu called Jisōto. The Jisōto are actually two swords that represent the North and South directions, and are of opposite magnetic fields. Jisho is killed by Uruha Ma's leader, Magensha, during the third round of the tournament. In the manga, Kurei absorbs Jisho's soul using his flame, and can summon him as a flame spirit similar to Kurenai. Jisho is one of the three Jūshinshu who are most loyal to Kurei, the other two being Raiha and Neon; all three of them swore their loyalty to him by writing their name in blood on a piece of paper that Raiha carries with him.

==== Uruha Oto (Uruha Sound) ====
Neon (音遠)
Voiced by: Kaya Matsutani (Japanese); Elinor Holt (English)
Neon is the captain of Uruha Oto. She and her sisters/teammates Miki and Aki were taken in by Kurei as maids when they had nowhere else to go, and it is because of the kindness he showed (and his devotion to Kurei) that Neon pledges her allegiance to him. She kills "Genjuro" after Uruha Maboroshī lost to the Hokage, only to encounter him again at the latter part of the manga. Neon has the innate ability to create force fields. She wields the madōgu Fukyō Waon, an orb that manipulates sound waves which she utilized with her flute, but the orb was destroyed by Mikagami. In the later part of the manga, she returns to the Ura Butō Satsujin arena's ruins to claim Jisho's Jisōto.
Miki (魅希)
Voiced by: Yūki Hamano
Miki is Neon's younger sister, who also serves as her usual partner during battle. Miki's forte is her speed, and uses the madōgu Idaten to enhance it. Although she is flirtatious, she is completely devoted to her sister. She also uses the madōgu Yamabiko, which deflects any sound waves. This madōgu is the core of her teamwork with Neon.
Aki (亜希)
Voiced by: Megumi Ogata (Japanese); Annika Odegard (English)
Aki is Neon's youngest sister, and uses the madōgu Kotodama to conjure illusions through her spoken words. After being defeated by Domon and coming to more friendly terms with the Hokage, Aki gives Recca her madōgu. Recca breaks it in an attempt to remove Kagerō's curse. When she accompanies Neon to SODOM, she fights with just a blade attached to her hand.

==== Uruha Rai (Uruha Thunder) ====
Raiha (雷覇)
Voiced by: Kōichi Tōchika (Japanese); Victor Atelevich (English)
The only member. He is the descendant of certain Hokage ninjas who ran away during the war that ultimately destroyed the Hokage clan, and the reason why he is fiercely loyal to Kurei is because he believes that it is the only way he can repay the cowardice that his ancestors showed. He usually uses a ninja sword and shurikens to fight, but he also wields Raijin; the evil counterpart of Fūjin that can manipulate electricity. He often saves Fūko from traps and gives her advice, but he eventually battles her and is defeated.

==== Uruha Ma (Uruha Devil) ====
Magensha (魔元紗)
Voiced by: Kaneto Shiozawa
Magensha is the captain of Uruha Ma. While he appears to be 'immortal' such that any form of attack cannot harm him, his real body is in fact located in another dimension while a false version of himself that he controls does battle for him. He wields the madōgu Hōumashin, which uses human heads and souls as bullets and fires them with immense force. He can also create wormholes using his other madōgu, Jigenkai Gyoku. The mask being worn by his false self is merely an extension of the Jigenkai Gyoku, as the real one is with Magensha in another dimension. Magensha was defeated by Domon Ishijima after deflecting two attacks from the Hōumashin. Kurei eventually has him killed.
Gashakura (餓紗喰)
Voiced by: Ikuya Sawaki (Japanese); Randy Brososky (English)
Gashakura is the co-captain of Uruha Ma and Magensha's younger brother. He wields a large morning star and the madōgu Magagumo, which acts as both armor and a weapon. He possesses a great sense of honor and respects his brother despite being fully aware of his atrocities. He befriends the Hokage after being defeated fair and square by Fūko. Later in the manga, he (along with Kashamaru and Tsukishiro) infiltrates SODOM to aid the Hokage in the final battle.
Kashamaru (火車丸)
Voiced by: Cho (Japanese); Lucas Gilbertson (English)
Kashamaru is a ninja whose madōgu, the Nisebi, allows him to mimic a flame master's powers to a certain extent. He is defeated when Rui decides to lend Recca her powers.
Tsukishiro (月白)
Voiced by: Tomokazu Seki (Japanese); Brendan Hunter (English)
Tsukishiro is a vain fighter who considers himself to be beautiful and dislikes having his face damaged. He has the tendency to make an entrance wrapped up like a mummy, in reference to H.G. Wells' novella The Invisible Man. His madōgu include Kaigetsu, a crescent boomerang; and Oboro, a cape that renders him invisible. He is defeated by Koganei.

==== Uruha Kurenai (Uruha Scarlet) ====
Uruha Kurenai is composed of its captain, Kurei, and four other members of the Jūshinshu.

Joker (ジョーカー, Jōkā)
Voiced by: Mitsuaki Madono (Japanese); Josh Rimer (English)
Joker is a mysterious man who wields the Taishaku Kaiten. In his dealings with the Hokage, he primarily drops hints about their opponents and their own powers while keeping them in the dark regarding his true intent and nature. It is only during the final round of the Ura Butō Satsujin that the Hokage Team finds out that Joker is part of the Uruha Jūshinshu, and is a member of Uruha Kurenai. He initially gets involved with the Uruha through attempting to fight Jisho, one of the members of the Jūshinshu, and saying that he intended to kill all the members of the Uruha. He fights Jisho continuously for two days, and then meets Kurei only to reveal that he wanted to join the Uruha in the first place. Kurei then offers him a spot in the Jūshinshu, and Joker joins on two conditions: that he can live the way he wants and can leave whenever he wants to, and for him to be allowed to be informal since it 'pains him to be respectful'. He is also known for having a Kansai accent.
Using the madōgu Taishaku Kaiten, Joker can manipulate gravity within a fixed radius. Taishaku Kaiten can also be used to increase or decrease the weight of objects by manipulating its mass. He can also move swiftly by reducing the effects of gravity on himself. The power to create a blackhole is said to be his weapon's ultimate power. Only Koganei, using his madōgu's (Kōgon Anki's) final form, manages to defeat Joker in battle. Later in the manga, Joker's fight with Kadotsu causes both of them to get sucked into a blackhole.
Joker's appearance varies within the manga series. He appears with long, black hair worn in braids in the Ura Butō Satsujin and when he helped Recca Hanabishi and his comrades reach the Sealed Lands, but appears with long, blonde hair during the latter part of the manga. Joker also appears as a playable character in the Flame of Recca: Final Burning PlayStation 2 game, but can only be unlocked through using the Konami code.
It is heavily implied that the character Nanashi from Anzai's anime/manga MAR (Marchen Awakens Romance) is Joker.
Noroi (呪)
Voiced by: Tohru Furusawa
Noroi wields the madōgu Bakuju, which actually has a mind of its own and eradicates a human's memories and consciousness in order to possess his/her body. When the body he currently possesses starts weakening, the Bakuju looks for a younger, stronger body to be its new host. After Noroi is overpowered by Domon Ishijima, the Bakuju tries to possess Domon, but his strong will overcomes Bakuju's power.
Mikoto (命)
Voiced by: Chieko Honda (Japanese); Jennifer Bain (English)
Mikoto uses a number of madōgu throughout the series: the three large puppet madōgu (Mikoto, Shirahige, and Ōtobide), Dokumashin (a set of sharp claws that contain a combination of all the most lethal poisons in the world) and the Gedokugan (the antidote for the Dokumashin). She's noted to be cruel and ruthless, or a 'female version of Mokuren'. In the manga, she has a romantic relationship with Mokuren. She later appears in both the Sealed Lands and SODOM City arcs.
Kai (戒)
Voiced by: Akio Ōtsuka (Japanese); Tommy James (English)
Kai wields the weapon Hyōma En, which can manipulate ice and is the evil counterpart of Tokiya Mikagami's Ensui. In the manga, the Hyōma En has a mind of its own and constantly demands to be fed blood. Kai studied Hyōmon Ken under Kyōza Meguri, who also trained Mikagami. Through constantly comparing him to his senpai Mikagami by saying that Mikagami is "gold" and he is "stone", Kyōza Meguri instilled within Kai a sense of anger and revenge in order to show Mikagami how futile living his life only for revenge is. Kai battles against Mikagami in the final round of the tournament and manages to defeat him, fulfilling his desire to be the best Hyōmon Ken master and in order to avenge his broken pride. After telling Mikagami not to live a life of revenge the way he himself did and that it was Kyōza Meguri who killed Mifuyu, Kai stabs himself with the Hyōma En to feed its thirst and allows himself to fall into the pit below the arena.
In the anime, Kai is supposedly the first Hyōmon Ken successor, but is discarded soon after Kyōza Meguri noticed Mikagami's potential. He also says that Kyōza Meguri killed Mifuyu, but adds that Kyōza Meguri's reason for doing so is because he believed that revenge would drive Mikagami to train harder (he says nothing about Kyōza Meguri's motives in the manga). After his battle with Mikagami, he does not stab himself with the Hyōma En, but he still allows himself to fall into the pit. Kurei shows respect for him by telling Mikoto not to speak ill of him after his victory/death.

==== Other Jūshinshu ====
Kyōza Meguri (巡狂座, Meguri Kyōza)
Voiced by: Hidekatsu Shibata (Japanese); Jim Sarantis (English)
The master of Hyōmon Ken, and teacher of both Kai and Tokiya Mikagami. Kyōza Meguri is also the second-in-command in Kurei's Jūshinshu, although he barely takes part in the organization since he was forced to join.
"Kyōza Meguri" is just a title that is passed on from a Hyōmon Ken master to his successor, and this Kyōza Meguri happens to be Tokiya's grandfather. When his son (Tokiya's father) died, Kyōza Meguri decided to pass the tradition on to his grandson. Mifuyu, Tokiya's older sister, refused to allow her younger brother to be exposed to violence, and volunteers to be Kyōza Meguri's student instead.
Kyōza Meguri blames himself entirely for Mifuyu's death, because he was the one who had forced her to take up Hyōmon Ken and inherit the Ensui. In his battle against Tokiya, Tokiya convinces him before he dies that she has surely forgiven him for what had happened.

=== Uruha Hokage (Uruha Shadow) ===
The Uruha Hokage is composed of Kurei, Raiha, Neon, and Joker. It was formed after the Ura Butō Satsujin in order to go after and battle Mori Kōran.

=== Ura Uruha ===
Ura Uruha is a new Uruha group formed by Mori Kōran to spy on Kurei whenever he acts suspicious. After Mori disbanded Kurei's Uruha, the Ura Uruha became core of Uruha. Its initial members are ex-Jūshinshu members Genjuro, Rasen, Mikoto and Kyōza Meguri, as well as the former Uruha Mokuren. It also recruited many new fighters. Since this group appears after the tournament, they do not appear in the anime, but they appear in the Flame of Recca FINAL BURNING PlayStation 2 game and the Flame of Recca GBA game.

Rasen (螺閃)
Rasen is a Jūshinshu who does not appear until after the Ura Butō Satsujin, and by then he is serving under Mori Kōran as a member of the Ura Uruha. He wields the madōgu Kōkai Gyoku, which can erase anything at the expense of something of equal value belonging to its wielder. Because of his usage of Kōkai Gyōku, Rasen has lost his feelings, his mother, and his voice. He also loses his blood when he erases the flame balls produced by Nadare during his battle against Recca. Rasen mentions that he is searching for the moment wherein he would be erased as punishment for erasing his mother, but Recca defeats him and tells him to live on and to stop using the Kōkai Gyoku.
Rasen uses the Kōkai Gyoku one last time in an attempt to erase Kagerō's curse, and even though he managed to do so, the madōgu itself was destroyed because of the curse's power. The destruction of the madōgu caused Rasen to regain his feelings and his voice, and he is shown speaking in the last volume of the manga.
Kirin (鬼凛)
Kirin is Rasen's partner who uses two madōgu; the Hōkishin, which can shoot out an elongated mechanical arm, and the Shingan, which allows her to read her target's thoughts. She is in love with Rasen and acts as his voice through reading his thoughts and relaying them to whoever it is he wishes to speak to. Mikoto states that Kirin is known for her innocence and that she has never touched anything pornographic/erotic in her entire life.
Gaō (牙王)
Gaō is Sekiō's elder brother who is addicted to chocolate. He blames Sekiō's death on Kurei and Domon, and attempts to avenge his brother by attacking Domon. He wields the madōgu Sekikon, which allows him to manipulate stone and can also conjure a stone giant called Gasekiō. He is initially defeated by Domon in the Sealed Lands arc. He reappears in Sodom and is forced to make the ultimate decision of chocolate versus the memory of his dead brother. He chooses chocolate. Then, he is defeated by Koganei.
Hisui (緋水)
Hisui is a fierce woman as whose motivation to fight is to find a moment wherein she can die. During a training session to promote her into the ranks of Ura Uruha wherein the trainees had to fight in the dark with a mask to silence their voices tied around their mouth, Hisui ends up killing her own boyfriend. She wields the madōgu Shinryo Shintō, a pair of blade-tonfa that can be elongated at will. After being defeated by Fūko, Hisui gives one of them to her. After learning her boyfriend's death was actually orchestrated by Mori Kōran and that he enjoyed the event as it happened, she defects from Uruha. She is killed by Mori Kōran while she was protecting Fūko.
Sōkakusai (双角斎)
Sōkakusai wields the madōgu Tamasui no Tsubo, an urn that traps people inside it. He's known to be possessive/obsessive over girls, and whenever he gets rejected, he seals the girl in the urn. He is obsessed with Fūko and constantly stalks her, and eventually seals her inside the Tamasui no Tsubo. Raiha rescues Fūko and kills Sōkakusai.
Kamui (神威)
Kamui is a homosexual, pedophilic cyborg who uses assorted mechanical weapons that he can attach to his arms. His mechanical weapons include extendable limbs, a laser, and a gatling gun. He says that he is in 'love' with Koganei and constantly stalks him. Koganei defeats him, but he reappears at SODOM, where he is defeated by Recca. He then says that he has fallen in love with Recca and ends up helping the Hokage.
Miruku (ミルク), Kurumi (クルミ), Mikuru (ミクル)
Miruku and Kurumi are maids, and Mikuru is a robot. Miruku wields a mop that controls Mikuru and can produce a smokescreen, while Kurumi wields a broom that can fire a laser beam. They are defeated with ease by Domon, Aki, and Miki.
Marie (マリー, Marī)
Marie is a dominatrix who wears a gown and lives in a large European-looking house full of torture devices. Her husband and 'pet', Pochi, is a gigantic man wielding an axe who does everything she asks him to. She wields the madōgu Sokubaku Benten, an elongating whip that resembles a cat-o'-nine-tails. She manages to trick Mikagami into drinking from a drugged teacup, and eventually straps him to a statue with the intention to make him her new 'pet'. She attempts to drug Domon, but because he drank from the same spot on the cup that Marie drank from (that was the only part that wasn't poisoned), Marie's plan did not work. She commands Pochi to attack Domon, and she intervenes when Pochi begins to get overwhelmed. Recca arrives, and he and Domon manage to defeat Pochi and Marie. Mikagami straps her to the statue after she is defeated. She is freed by Team Kū member Fujimaru, and tricks him into becoming her new 'pet'.
Z (ゼット, Zetto)
Z is the leader of the zombies who fights for Mori under the orders of an unnamed scientist. He possesses a whistle to summon more zombies to aid him. The zombies are former human beings created through infusing their bodies with cells taken from Mori (who had already fused with the Tendō Jigoku at the time). Mori's cells don't mesh well with the human body, and it causes mutations and eats away at the human cells, which will ultimately destroy the zombie. The scientist created a sort of medicine to slow down this deterioration, and he gives this to Z and the other zombies as a reward for obeying his orders. Koganei convinces Z that he and his comrades are not disposable creatures as the scientist said, but they are still human despite their monstrous forms. This causes Z to betray the scientist and order the other zombies to stop attacking the Hokage and the Hokage's allies.
Karame (搦)
Karame is a mummy-like creature that works for the Uruha Shishiten member, Kadotsu. Karame possesses a Shikigami, has the power to control paper (Saichō of Team Kū also possesses a Shikigami). He is defeated by Fūko.

==== Uruha Shishiten (Uruha Lion) ====
The Shishiten is the equal of Uruha Jūshinshu to Ura Uruha. They consist of 4 top elite members of Ura Uruha.

Aoi (葵)
Aoi is a clone produced using Kurei's and Kurenai's genes. Due to his inability to generate flames, he is deemed a failure and feels incredibly jealous towards the only 'successful' clone, Renge. He wields a gun, but his true strength lies in the madōgu Shinryo Shikō, which enables him to alter one's memory. He also wields a sword attached to his right hand, but it is unknown if this is an unnamed madogu, or simply a basic weapon. He first appears in the Sealed Lands, where he easily defeated an injured Mikagami after the latter emerged victorious against Mokuren and Mikoto. After Rasen loses the will to fight, Aoi replaces him as the leader of the Ura Uruha. He eventually transfers to Nashikiri High School in order to befriend Yanagi and the others. This is because his mission was to kidnap Yanagi and erase her memory so that she could be 'absorbed' by the Tendō Jigoku, and the Shinryo Shikō can only tamper with the memories that both the target and the user are aware of. Yanagi's kindness to him makes him doubt his loyalty to Mori. He is defeated by Recca, wherein he is actually found out to be a boy not a girl and he defects from the Ura following one's duty, but in acting according to your heart. Along with Hiruko, he defects from Uruha and joins the Hokage in the final against Tendō Jigoku.
Hiruko (蛭湖)
The only polite warrior in the Shishiten. He owns the madōgu Ketsushu, which allows him to utilize his own blood as weapon or shield in a fight. He could create swords or shields from his blood. He is shown to suffer from anemia (due to excessive use of blood) and has a lot supply of blood with the same blood type as his in his arena. But due to Shiguma's attack, almost all of his blood supply is destroyed. He is defeated by Domon when he failed to absorb Domon's blood. Domon save Hiruko from dying by giving him the remaining blood supply he can find. With a new conviction, he and Aoi defect from Shishiten and decided to ally himself with Hokage.
Kirito (綺理斗)
Kirito is a woman who wields the madōgu Rinne, which enables her to manipulate her own age and Nehan, a bracelet that allows her to control a beast called Shiguma. Her power over Shiguma makes up for her inability to fight on her own. After using Rinne too many times, Kirito has become unaware of her true self, and thinks that the only way to really find out is to destroy Rinne. However, she is afraid of turning out to be an old lady and not having Rinne to change her back to her younger self. Mori Kōran promised to reveal the truth if she served him, and so she does so. After witnessing Shiguma being defeated by Koganei and Joker, she fell into despair. In the end of the series, her fate is unknown.
Kadotsu (門都)
Kadotsu is a sadistic warrior who enjoys killing, and claims that Magensha of Uruha Ma is always impersonating him. He is a formidable warrior, able to take down many opponents at once with just physical feats, but also utilizes the madōgu Mumyō and Mongamae, which open dimensional portals. He faces the remaining members of Uruha Ma and members Team Kū. He kills most of the Kū except Saichō, Kūkai, Fujimaru, and Daikoku. Kurei interrupts the battle and severely burns Kadotsu using the dead Kū members' souls as flame spirits. Kadotsu survives Kurei's attack and eventually battles with Koganei and Joker after Kirito is defeated. In an ensuing battle against Joker, both he and Joker are sucked into a black hole created by Joker's Taishaku Kaiten.

== Supporting characters (present day) ==
Ganko Morikawa (森川 願子, Morikawa Ganko)
Voiced by: Kiyomi Asai (Japanese); Caitlynne Medrek (English)
Ganko is a small girl whose name means "stubborn". Like Kaoru, she was once allied with Kurei until she was defeated by Fūko. She has the ability to control marionettes using the madōgu Kata Kugutsu. Later she goes on to live with Fūko and is left behind when the Hokage go off to join the Ura Butō Satsujin. In the anime, she accompanies the Hokage to the tournament along with accompanied with her doll, Kondo.
Kondo (近藤さん, Kondō-san)
Voiced by: Tōru Ōkawa (Japanese); Roger Rhodes (English)
Kondo is Ganko's stuffed fox doll. Although Ganko does not use the Kata Kugutsu to bring him to life in the manga, she uses it on him in the anime series, and he speaks with a Kansai accent.
Shigeo Hanabishi (花菱 茂男, Hanabishi Shigeo)
Voiced by: Tōru Ōkawa (Japanese); Roger Rhodes (English)
Shigeo is Recca's foster father and a fireworks manufacturer. He and Recca tend to argue a lot, especially when Recca catches him smoking cigarettes while making fireworks. In the years before Kagerō's arrival, he made Recca believe that his favorite actress was his wife and Recca's deceased mother.
Mifuyu Mikagami (水鏡 美冬, Mikagami Mifuyu)
Voiced by: Miki Takahashi (Japanese); Carol-Anne Day (English)
Mifuyu is Tokiya's deceased elder sister who was killed when protecting both him and Ensui. This makes Tokiya driven to find her murderer and avenge her, which leads him to learn Hyōmon Ken under Kyōza Meguri. It is later revealed that she was also a Hyōmon Ken practitioner. She bears an uncanny resemblance to Yanagi. In the manga, she can be differentiated from Yanagi because her hair is shorter. In the anime series, she looks exactly like Yanagi, except for the fact that Yanagi's eyes are brown and Mifuyu's are blue.
Fumio Tatesako (立迫 文夫, Tatesako Fumio)
Voiced by: Kenichi Ono
A new Japanese History teacher, who, like Recca, is obsessed with ninja. After being kidnapped and rescued, he becomes aware of Recca and his friends' battle a bit and covers up for their absences. In the anime series, he is not shown to be aware of the battle.
Kurenai (紅)
Voiced by: Akiko Yajima (Japanese); Onalea Gilbertson (English)
Kurenai is Kurei's lover who first appears in the series as a winged flame spirit that is summoned by Kurei. A few years before Kurei encounters Recca, Kurenai had been sent to Kurei's mansion by Mori Kōran, with a bomb secretly planted on her body to test whether Kurei could suppress his emotions. However, they end up falling in love. Mori triggers the bomb and kills her, but Kurei uses his flame powers to absorb her and turn her into a flame spirit. She is revealed to have loved red flowers, and she even slapped Kurei when he destroyed the bouquet of roses she was showing him.
Tsukino Mori (森 月乃, Mori Tsukino)
Tsukino is Mori Kōran's wife, who is kind and gentle in contrast to her husband. Tsukino found Kurei after he was shunted into the present through the time portal. She was kind to him and Kurei obviously loved her, so after Mori used his own wife as a hostage so Kurei would follow his orders and become a heartless killing machine. There is a bomb implanted within her body that Mori has control of, but Raiha uses the power of Raijin to defuse it.

=== Team Kū (Team Sky) ===
Team Kū is a group of fighters who were the first opponents of Team Hokage in the first round of Ura Butō Satsujin. They used to be an honorable martial arts group, but later turned into a mercenary group due to financial crisis. The Kū eventually become one of Hokage's most prominent allies. In the manga, most of the Kū members' abilities are innate, with the exception of Saichō. In the anime, however, most of them wield a madōgu.

Kūkai (空海)
Voiced by: Unshō Ishizuka (Japanese); Noah Umholtz (English)
The leader of Team Kū. His calm, easygoing nature earned him the nickname 'The Buddha'. However, striking him three times will activate his psychic device and turns him into a demon-like fighter. During his fight against Recca, he teaches the latter how not to show mercy on his enemies during battle (in the anime he nearly beats Recca to death).
Saichō (最澄)
Voiced by: Junko Noda (Japanese); Sean Broadhurst (English)
Saichō is the co-captain of Team Kū, a young-looking man who has very strong convictions and morals. He has a heart ailment that limits his ability to fight (he can only fight for ten minutes) after being stabbed in the chest during his fight with Kū's students, but he still seen as one of the best among the Kū. He uses the madōgu Shikigami, which enables him to control paper. He is good friends with Kūkai's daughter, Misora, and he also befriends Koganei.
Fujimaru (藤丸)
Voiced by: Eiji Ito (Japanese); Paul Hunter (English)
In sharp contrast to his comrades, Fujimaru is perverted and enjoys killing. He fights with small sickles that he can throw, and he uses them to strip Fūko's clothes during their battle. In the anime, he is the founder of the 'Fūko Fans Club'.
Minamio (南尾)
Voiced by: Kentaro Ito (Japanese); Mark Gatha (English)
Minamio is known for his cat-like eyes and his elastic, rubber-like body (this is an innate ability in the manga, but is because of the madōgu Nan in the anime). He is defeated by Domon, but their fight is officially declared a draw. He is later killed by Kadotsu and his soul is absorbed by Kurei's flame.
Daikoku (大黒)
Voiced by: Shinya Otaki (Japanese); Ben Jeffery (English)
Daikoku fights using a bō that he can rotate while Daikoku is spinning it causing vibrations and gives it the power to destroy hard objects such as rocks. He usually acts as a voice of reason between the other junior team members. He is known for his swift and accurate fighting technique, but is defeated by Mikagami .

=== The Twelve Referees ===
The referees in the Ura Butō Satsujin are composed of twelve women who represent the twelve animals of the Chinese zodiac. Tatsuko (voiced by Konami Yoshida in the anime), the referee representing the Dragon is in love with Recca and is jealous of Yanagi. Nemi (voiced by Akiko Nakagawa), representing the Rat, replaces Tatsuko as referee during the battle between Hokage and Uruha Maboroshii and also acts a commentator in the latter fights. Enna, representing the Monkey, oversees the battle between Fūko and Mikoto wherein Mikoto injures her in order to distract Fūko and win the match. The other referees include Inuko (representing the Dog), Yōko (voiced by Kae Araki; representing the Goat), Umi (representing the Rabbit), Ushino (represents the Ox), Inoko (representing the Pig), Toraha (representing the Tiger), Satomi (representing the Snake), Midori (representing the Rooster), and Amagi (representing the Horse).

=== Circus ===
Circus (鎖悪架子（サーカス）, Sākasu) is a team that participated in the second Ura Butō Satsujin and were defeated by Uruha Kurenai. The team is composed of Yashiro (the leader), Karin, Gaia, and Chigusari. During their battle against Uruha Kurenai during the second Ura Butō Satsujin, Karin is killed by Noroi due to orders given by Kurei despite the fact that they were already giving up. They participated in the third Ura Butō Satsujin to avenge their fallen comrade, but Gaia and Chigusari die in their battles. Yashiro, being the only surviving member of the team, forfeits to the Hokage during the pre-semifinal match before dying shortly afterward.

== From the past ==
=== Hokage Clan ===
The Hokage (火影; Fire Shadow) is a clan renowned for their production and use of madōgu, which are mystical weapons that have various powers ranging from the manipulation of elements to increasing its user's strength. The Hokage clan was exterminated during an attack made by Oda Nobunaga on the clan's village in 1567. The Hokage leaders are known as Flame Masters because of their innate ability to control the element of fire. Each Flame Master is born with this ability, and are traditionally succeeded by one who is also born with this ability. In the case of the eighth Flame Master Ōka, his two sons (Recca Hanabishi and Kurei) are born with this ability. In the Hokage tradition, this meant that one of the children was born with a cursed flame, and should be terminated. The Hokage elders assumed that Kurei was the cursed child since they thought that he had an evil soul and attempted to kill him, but Kagerō, Recca's mother, stopped them from doing so.

The madōgu are mystical objects created by the Hokage that grant their users special abilities, such as allowing their users to manipulate certain elements (as in the case of the Fūjin, which allows its wielder to manipulate the element of wind) and enhancing their user's strength/skills (as in the case of the Dosei no Wa, which increases its user's physical strength and the Idaten, which increases its user's running speed). Two madōgu creators were mentioned in the manga: Kokū, who creates madōgu to protect the clan and their loved ones, and Kaima, who creates madōgu solely for killing.

==== Flame Dragons ====
The Flame Dragons (火竜, Karyū) are entities that manifest themselves in selected Hokage leaders, each dragon possessing its own unique flame abilities/techniques. Each dragon is an embodiment of the soul of a previous flame master who died with regrets and/or without being able to fulfill his/her mission.

Resshin (裂神)
Voiced by: Jūrōta Kosugi (Japanese); Ethan Cole (English)
Resshin is the eighth Flame Dragon, and its most recent leader. He refuses to help Recca until he knows who is more worthy of his powers between Recca and Kurei. During his lifetime, his flame took the form of a phoenix, just like his son Kurei's. He has the ability to convert souls to entities of fire. He has a special summoning condition: the first seven dragons have to be summoned simultaneously before he could appear. He in reality was Ōka was the sixth generation leader of the Hokage clan during the Eiroku period. He is married to Kagerō and took Reina as his consort, and is the father of both Kurei and Recca. He loves both women and both of his sons equally, and his only regret is that he failed to save Princess Sakura and the Sawaki Clan from destruction. He is later killed by the soldiers of Oda Nobunaga, but his spirit lives on as the eighth Flame Dragon Resshin. Recca uses Resshin's power to save Yanagi's soul from the Tendo Jigoku.
Kokū (虚空)
Voiced by: Kenichi Ogata (Japanese); Randy Brososky (English)
Kokū is one of the creators of madōgu, and a Hokage Flame Master (and leader of the Flame Dragons) before Ōka. He and his rival Kaima competed to create madōgu, but he is forced to kill his rival once the latter succumbed into further madness. Alone among the flame dragons, he could manifest himself in human form, who is often portrayed as perverted but also very wise. Koku's power takes the form of a giant, concentrated laser beam.
Rui (塁)
Voiced by: Junko Noda (Japanese); Barb Mitchell (English)
Rui is the sixth Flame Dragon who has the power to create illusions. She is a beautiful kunoichi who is not afraid to show her body as an advantage in combat. She demonstrated the ability to create a flame pillar during Recca's fight with Kashamaru. She is also fond of riddles and, in the times after Recca regained her after knowing her original identity, she often ask them whenever she's summoned in her original human form.
Madoka (円)
Voiced by: Kouichi Toochika (Japanese); Lucas Gilbertson (English)
Madoka is the fifth Flame Dragon with the power to create barriers. He is a chubby ninja who speaks politely, but is rather sarcastic. During his lifetime, his flame took the form of a tortoise.
Setsuna (刹那)
Voiced by: Tōru Ōkawa (Japanese); Roger Rhodes (English)
Setsuna is the fourth Flame Dragon. He can burn anyone who looks into his eye. He is a cruel, sadistic ninja who lives only to kill. He dislikes Recca and won't hesitate to kill him whenever opportunity arises.
Homura (焔群)
Voiced by: Tōru Ōkawa (Japanese); Mike Shepherd (English)
Homura is the third Flame Dragon with the power to create flame whips and enhance his master's strength. During his lifetime, his flame took the form of a snake.
Saiha (砕羽)
Voiced by: Susumu Chiba (Japanese); Mark Gatha (English)
Saiha is the second Flame Dragon with the power to produce a blade of fire. He is the dragon most used by Recca. During his lifetime, his flame took the form of a hawk.
Nadare (崩)
Voiced by: Junko Noda (Japanese); Onalea Gilbertson (English)
Nadare is the first Flame Dragon with the power to produce fireballs. She is the friendliest of all the dragons and is often used by Recca along with Saiha. Nadare was the first dragon to lend her powers to Recca as he was protecting Kagerō, though Recca refers to Saiha as the "first form" of the Flame Dragons.

==== Other ====
Reina (麗奈)
Reina is Kurei's blood mother who had been Kagerō's rival since they were young. She often fights alongside Kagerō for Ōka's sake, but in the anime, she is shown to absolutely despise Kagerō. She is later taken by Ōka as his consort and gives birth to Kurei. She defends Kurei when he is about to be killed by the Hokage elders, and winds up being exiled along with her son. Although she dislikes Recca, she doesn't hate Ōka for the decision. When the village is razed by Nobunaga's soldiers, Reina rescues Kurei from the prison and sends him off alone, so she wouldn't be a burden to him. Her last words are that Kurei must live and be strong, and that as long as he lives, Hokage would never perish.
Kaima (海魔)
Kaima is Kokū's rival and the other creator of madōgu. Kaima is a madman who desires to create weapons to kill. He is eventually killed by his fellow kinsmen, but he transfers his spirit to his last creation: Tendō Jigoku. He is very similar to Mori Kōran in terms of personality.

=== Other characters ===
Princess Sakura (桜姫, Sakura-hime)
She possesses the power to heal any wounds and is the previous incarnation of Yanagi. She is in love with her attendant Koheita, but upon his death, she chose to commit seppuku, with Ōka preventing the Takasugi clan from entering the Sawaki clan's castle.
Shimizu Koheita Takamitsu (清水 小平太 貴光)
Koheita is a vassal of the Sawaki Clan and a childhood friend of Sakura, who is also deeply in love with her. He is the one who recommends that the Sawaki clan enlist the aid of the Hokage to assassinate Takasugi Jyugorō Masakane, the leader of the Takasugi clan. Unfortunately, he dies in the war that ensued after the Hokage failed to assassinate Takasugi. It is heavily implied that Recca is his reincarnation.
Takasugi Jugorō Masakane (高杉 獣吾郎 正金)
The leader of the Takasugi clan. He is a greedy, ambitious warlord who demands that the Sawaki clan surrender Sakura to him in marriage in exchange for the clan's safety. After the Sawaki and Hokage fail to assassinate him, he moves in to destroy the clan. He succeeds, but when he attempts to capture Sakura himself, he and his army is obliterated by Ōka and his seven Flame Dragons.
