= Jennifer Bain =

Canadian actress

Jennifer Bain is a voice actress who worked for Blue Water Studios in Calgary, Alberta, Canada. She has voiced Rosamia Badam in Mobile Suit Zeta Gundam, including Mobile Suit Gundam: Gundam vs. Zeta Gundam and Android 18 in Dragon Ball GT. She also loaned her voice in the anime television series, D.I.C.E.

== Roles ==
- Zoids: Chaotic Century as Lt. Harden
- Mobile Suit Zeta Gundam as Rosamia Badam
- Mobile Suit Gundam: Gundam vs. Zeta Gundam as Rosamia Badam
- Gregory Horror Show as Angel/Demon Dog
- Flame of Recca as Mikoto
- Dynasty Warriors: Gundam 2 as Rosamia Badam
- Dynasty Warriors: Gundam 3 as Rosamia Badam
- Dragonball as Mrs Brief
- Dragon Ball GT as Android 18 and Frieza
- D.I.C.E. as Mok

She is now a professional multi medium visual and performing artist focussed on acrylic painting and puppeteering.
