= List of Jubei-chan 2 episodes =

The cover art of the first DVD compilation released by Geneon Entertainment.

This is a list of episodes of the anime series Jubei-chan: The Ninja Girl-The Counter Attack of the Siberian Yagyu created by Akitaro Daichi, produced by Madhouse and licensed by Geneon Entertainment. The series is the adaptation of The Secret of the Lovely Eyepatch that premiered in 1999. The Counter Attack of the Siberian Yagyu follows a year after the first series, introducing Freesia Yagyu, Yagyu Jubei's daughter who claims herself as the rightful owner of the "Lovely Eyepatch" and the Siberian Yagyu, a clan that was destroyed by the Edo Yagyu. Freesia tries to take the "Lovely Eyepatch" from Jiyu and at the same time, the Siberian Yagyu attempts to end the grudge on Jubei II.

The first episode first aired on 7 January 2004 and concluded on 31 March 2004. The series broadcast on TV Tokyo in Japan, ntv7 in Malaysia and Tooniverse in Korea. The episodes also broadcast on Animax, an anime television network that also broadcast the series across its English-language networks in Southeast Asia and South Asia.

For all thirteen episodes, the OP theme "Nagi ~Peace of Mind~" is performed by Okazaki Ritsuko. The ED theme, "Kokoro Harete Yoru mo Akete", is performed by Yui Horie, who also voiced Jiyuu Nanohana.

A single DVD box collection, containing all thirteen episodes of the anime, was released on 1 August 2006 by Geneon Entertainment. Four DVD compilations, the first two DVD containing five episodes and the third with three. Also, Geneon Entertainment has released four DVD compilations of the English adaptation of the series, with the first DVD compilations containing four episodes, with three episodes in the other three compilations. The first compilation was released on 28 June 2005, and the fourth on 20 December 2005.

== Episode list ==
No.	Title	Original release date
1	"It Melted Somewhere on Earth"; Transliteration: "Sekai no Dokoka ga Toketeita" (Japanese: 世界のどこかが溶けていた)	7 January 2004
Three hundred years ago, Yagyuu Juubei fights Kita Retsusai, the leader of the Northern Yagyu that has been eliminated by the Edo Yagyu. In the ensuing battle, Kita Ressai along with Jubei's wife and daughter were swallowed and drowned in the ice. In the present day, Jiyuu Nanohana encounters a strange child holding the Lovely Eyepatch and tries to give it to her. After fleeing away from the child, Jiyu meets a young transfer student named Freesia. She takes Freesia to her home just in time to be attacked by Kita Furo and the Siberian Yagyu. The strange child appears and swiftly sticks the Eyepatch on Jiyu, transforming her into Jubei II. The battle ends in her favor, but then a mysterious swordswoman with a spade-shaped Eyepatch appears and attacks her.
2	"Fate has Arrived by Coincidence"; Transliteration: "Guuzen Unmei Yattekita" (Japanese: 偶然運命やって来た)	14 January 2004
The swordswoman who calls herself the true Yagyu Jubei II nearly kills Jiyu; she searches for the Eyepatch but it is taken back by the child. Jiyu awakens in her room and asks Freesia to stay; she says she will stay one night. Meanwhile, Jiyu's father Sai meets up with his old boss and decides to ghost-write a novel. Back to the Siberian Yagyu, they are attacked by the swordswoman; this makes Kita Furo attack Jiyu. At the end of the day, the child reappears and introduces himself.
3	"An Unneeded Item Had Been Thrown Away"; Transliteration: "Iranai MONO wo Suteteita" (Japanese: いらないモノを捨てていた)	21 January 2004
Kita Furo bursts in through the front door and demands a duel with Jubei, but even without the Eyepatch, Jiyu is still able to defend herself. The following day, Furo attacks her again and is defeated; Jiyu, however, is forced to face the swordswoman. At the end of their fight, she tries to give her the Eyepatch, but it is taken by the child, Ayunosuke. Reaching her limits, Jiyu collapses, Shiro and the Ruffians quickly take her to the doctor, and Ayunosuke collapses in despair.
4	"Father that Never Returned"; Transliteration: "Zutto Karanu Chichi Datta" (Japanese: ずっと帰らぬ父だった)	28 January 2004
Mikage decides to investigate; she runs across the swordswoman just in time to save Ayunosuke from falling. After restoring her health, Jiyu blows the whistle, which summons Ayunosuke, and asks him about the Eyepatch. Ayunosuke explains everything, and though Jiyu is moved with tears, she refuses to accept the Eyepatch, swearing that she will never become Yagyu Jubei again.
5	"Peaceful in a Fake Family"; Transliteration: "NiseMONO Kazoku de Nakondeta" (Japanese: にせモノ家族でなごんでた)	4 February 2004
The Siberian Yagyu decide to defeat Jubei while she and her family are out shopping. They kidnap Freesia, forcing Jiyu to follow them to a castle to rescue her. On the other hand, Jiyu does not want to transform and when she reaches the top of the castle, Freesia is pushed down into the moat to drown. This makes Jiyu jump off to save her friend. As they drown, Ayunosuke sticks the Eyepatch on Jiyu; she transforms into Jubei II and defeats White Tiger Nizaemon. Meanwhile, Mikage's husband informs her about Kita Furo.
6	"Yesterday's Friend is in Fact an Enemy"; Transliteration: "Kinou no Tomo ga Teki Datta" (Japanese: 昨日の友が敵だった)	11 February 2004
In order to defeat Yagyu Jubei II, Kita Furo sets out on a training trip. Jiyu feels depressed for breaking an important promise, and discovers that Sai has continued to ghostwrite. Upset, she runs away; Mikage, while going after her, meets up with Nizaemon, who has been defeated before. He begs her to convince Jiyu to free the rest of the Siberian Yagyu. Furo later catches up with Jiyu and demands that she fight him, but she refuses even when Nizaemon begs her to fight and Ayunosuke asks her to accept the Eyepatch. Suddenly, Freesia appears and takes the Eyepatch.
7	"Cut, Fell, and Disappeared"; Transliteration: "Kirarete Ochite Kieteita" (Japanese: 斬られて落ちて消えていた)	18 February 2004
Despite having stolen the Eyepatch, Ayunosuke still manages to take it back as he believes it is rightfully owned by Jiyu. In front of Jiyu's eyes, Freesia transforms into the mysterious swordswoman and takes down Furo; she forces Ayunosuke to give Jiyu the Eyepatch so she can transform and fight or she will slice him up. In a dramatic showdown, Jiyu transforms and takes on Freesia in a fantastic cliff top fight. Just as Jubei II begins to deliver the final blow, Jiyu's spirit stops her. Seeing this, Freesia immediately slices her across the torso; Jiyu falls toward the forest below. With Jiyu out of the way temporarily, Freesia tries her best to charm Sai and make him forget about his real daughter.
8	"Found Myself Smiling After Defeat"; Transliteration: "Makete Hohoemi Ukandeta" (Japanese: 負けてほほ笑み浮かんでた)	25 February 2004
Jiyu lies injured in the forest with Ayunosuke tending her wounds while Sai blames himself for her disappearance. Taking advantage of Sai's emotional state, Freesia continues to deceive him by playing the model daughter, but she is haunted by what happened in Hontsuru Castle. In order to paint Jiyu in the worst possible light, she lies to everyone about her absence. Meanwhile, Ayunosuke tries her best to make Jiyu accept the Eyepatch; Jiyu however refuses, saying that her task is over. Ayunosuke runs away, and lies transformed into a 300-year-old body.
9	"Swords that Crossed Paths Before"; Transliteration: "Itsuka Majieta Ken Datta" (Japanese: いつか交えた剣だった)	3 March 2004
Upset that he could not match both Jubei II, Kita Furo calls up his father's power. He recollects his childhood memories when he first crossed with the original Yagyu Jubei, and the fallen time of the Northern Yagyu. As Jiyu recovers, she encounters Furo, tells him that everything is over. Feeling guilty for his daughter's disappearance and recalling his deceased wife, Sai agonizes over his failings as a father and as a human being. When Jiyu returns home, hoping a warm reunion with her father, Sai however, deceived by Freesia, slaps her instead. Confused by this, Jiyu leaves home and Sai is in despair.
10	"I Returned to Myself of That Day"; Transliteration: "Ano Hi no WATASHI ni Modotteta" (Japanese: あの日のワタシに戻ってた)	10 March 2004
Mikage finds out about what happened to Ayunosuke and sets out to search for Jiyu, who now is in such a state of confusion, she does not recognizes Sai and believes that Mikage is her mother. Then, Mikage knocks out Sai and calls her husband to keep an eye on him, and takes Jiyu to Ayunosuke's side. Elsewhere, Shiro and the Ruffians question the Siberian Yagyu just as Freesia decides to eliminate them all.
11	"Time to Decide One's Path"; Transliteration: "Shindou wo Kimeru Toki Datta" (Japanese: 真路を決めるときだった)	17 March 2004
Jiyu continues to be confused even when Mikage begs her to take up her sword once more. Nizaemon informs them about Freesia; Kita Furo decides it is time to end his fight and begs Jiyu for a rematch after finishing Freesia. Sai appears and instead of trying to help her, he tells her to stop running from her destiny. Jiyu finally returns to her old self; albeit with a fever, accepts the Lovely Eyepatch, and revives Ayunosuke. After defeating Kita Furo, Freesia is shocked when she sees Jiyu still alive; the two rivals engage one another in a duel.
12	"Only My Spirit was Absent"; Transliteration: "KOKORO ga Rusuna Dake Datta" (Japanese: ココロが留守なだけだった)	24 March 2004
The showdown between the two Yagyu Jubei II continues; Freesia becomes exhausted by Jubei's unrestrained power and withdraws. Meanwhile, Sai tends to an injured Mikage. After her near defeat, Sai suddenly offers her the "Mutodori" technique, Shiro and the Ruffians try to calm her down, but all are refused. She keeps on fighting, but Jiyu (using an image of Yagyu Jubei) tells her that the Spade Eyepatch she made accepted her as the true Yagyu Jubei the Second, and that she didn't need the Lovely Eyepatch to accomplish this. Freesia finally realizes this and becomes friends with her again as they return to normal. As things start to go right, the spirit of Kita Ressai takes over Furo's body and transforms into a giant ice monster, demanding from Jubei a final battle.
13	"Spade, Heart and It Was Alright"; Transliteration: "SUPEEDO HAATO de MARU Datta" (Japanese: スペードハートでマルだった)	31 March 2004
The ice monster makes Jiyu and Freesia fight side by side after Ayunosuke finds and returns their Eyepatches. As Jiyu's fever begins to spread, she entrusts Freesia as the battle continues, and uses her fever to melt the monster. Kita Furo is freed; he provokes Jiyu into a duel and loses. The monster starts to reconstitute himself so fast that the two Jubei II's fuse and fight as one; together, they wipe out Kita Ressai, releasing him from his hatred. The spirit of Yagyu Jubei congratulates them both before leaving with Koinosuke and Ayunosuke. A few days later, Jiyu, while walking along with her friends, sees Ayunosuke sleeping and rushes to her side (it is unknown if Jiyu and Freesia still have their Eyepatches or not). The ending credits shows how the lives of other characters change (for example, Furo becomes a police officer). Sai continues his career while supervised by Mikage, and Freesia visits her father's grave.

== See also ==
- List of Jubei-chan characters
- List of Jubei-chan episodes
