= Onalea Gilbertson =

Canadian voice actress and musician

- Other names: Kris Rundle; Kris Hamil
- Occupations: Voice actress; musician
- Spouse: Doug McKeag (divorced)
- Relatives: Lucas Gilbertson (brother)

Onalea Gilbertson (ONALEA) is a Canadian voice actress and musician from Calgary, Alberta. Gilbertson is most known for her own creations; Blanche: The Bittersweet Life of a Wild Prairie Dame and Requiem for a Lost Girl.

Onalea is a multidisciplinary creator, performer, puppeteer, director & recording artist. As a music and theatre artist Onalea has performed numerous roles world wide in both the traditional and the avant-garde. A fuller list of her works exists here.

She is currently a cast member of Sleep No More in New York.

Aside from her work in theatre, Gilbertson has worked with Blue Water Studios, doing voice-over work on the English dubs of anime. Among her credits are Chandi and Hinoki Sai in Betterman, Ceres in Ceres, Celestial Legend, Nastasha in Mobile Fighter G Gundam, Nina Wang in My-Otome, and Moonbay in Zoids: Chaotic Century.

She is often credited as Kris Rundle or Kris Hamil.

== Filmography ==
=== Anime ===
- Banner of the Stars - Hecto-Cmdr, Atosuryua
- Betterman - Chandy, Hinoki Sai
- Beyblade: Metal Masters - Sophie
- Ceres, Celestial Legend - Ceres
- D.I.C.E. - Jane Thomson
- Deltora Quest - Anna
- Di Gi Charat Nyo! - Francoise Usada
- Doki Doki School Hours - Hatoko Hori (Hori-sensei)
- Dragon Ball - Launch (Blue Water Dub)
- Fancy Lala - Yumi Haneishi
- Flame of Recca - Fuko Kirisawa, Koran's Aide
- Full Moon O Sagashite - Ms. Oshige
- Gregory Horror Show - Neko-Zombie
- Mobile Fighter G Gundam - Nastasha Zabigov
- My-Otome - Nina Wáng
- Pretty Cure - Pandora, Porun, Glenda Blackstone, Aiden, Ow Wee
- Viper's Creed - Thelesia
- Zeta Gundam - Beltorchika Irma
- Zoids: Chaotic Century - Moonbay

=== Non-anime Voice Work ===
- Jungo -Tooey
- Weebles - Additional Voices

=== Video games ===
- Battle Assault 3 featuring Gundam Seed - Murrue Ramius
- Crimson Tears - Amber
- Gregory Horror Show - Neko-Zombie
- Mega Man X: Command Mission - Ferham
