= Scott Roberts (voice actor) =

Canadian voice actor

- Occupation: Actor

Scott Roberts is a Canadian voice, film and stage actor.

== Voice roles ==
=== Animated series ===
| Year | Title | Role | Crew role, Notes | Source |
|---|---|---|---|---|
| 2010-2016 | The Little Prince | Ivory (the son of Anemone, in love with Euphony) in "The Planet of Music" arc | | |

=== Anime ===
| Year | Title | Role | Crew role, Notes | Source |
|---|---|---|---|---|
| 2002–2003 | Zoids: Chaotic Century and Zoids: Guardian Force | Hiltz | | |
| 2002 | Mobile Fighter G Gundam | George de Sand | | |
| 2003 | Dragon Ball GT | Boy in Arcade 1, Cop, Gohan, Negotiator, Uub | Blue Water dub | |
| 2003–2005 | Dragon Ball | Aftermath Spectator 6, Announcements, Blue Subordinate 2, Cop Glasses, Man with Megaphone, Monk 2, Pamput, Soldier 3, Spectator 2 (Blue Water dub) | Blue Water dub | |
| 2004-2007 | Flame of Recca | Recca Hanabishi | | |
| 2004 | Mobile Suit Zeta Gundam | Kai Shiden | | |
| 2005 | D.I.C.E. | Tak Carter | | |
| 2005-2006 | Hoop Days | Ranmaru Miura, additional voices | | |
| 2005 | Jubei-Chan 2: The Counterattack of Siberia Yagyu | Shiro Ryujoji | | |
| 2005-2006 | Doki Doki School Hours | Yuichi Kudo | | |
| 2006-2009 | The Law of Ueki | Inumaru, Wanko | | |
| 2007-2007 | Tide-Line Blue | Orange-Haired Ulysses Tech, Ostrich Handler 1, Ulysses Sonar Officer | | |
| 2009-2010 | Pretty Cure | Kirea | | |
| 2011-2012 | Cardfight!! Vanguard | Shin | | |
| 2011-2012 | Viper's Creed | Haruki | | |
| 2016-2017 | Beyblade Burst | Additional voices | | |

=== Video Games ===
| Year | Title | Role | Crew role, Notes | Source |
|---|---|---|---|---|
| 2004 | Battle Assault 3 featuring Gundam Seed | Athrun Zala | | |
| 2004 | InuYasha: The Secret of the Cursed Mask | Mokichi | | |
| 2005 | Mobile Suit Gundam: Gundam vs. Zeta Gundam | Apolly Bay | | |
| 2005 | D.I.C.E. | Tak Carter | | |
| 2005 | Mobile Suit Gundam SEED: Never Ending Tomorrow | Lowe Gule | | |
| 2006 | Mega Man Powered Up | Oil Man | | |
| 2007 | Dynasty Warriors: Gundam | Apolly Bay | | |
| 2009 | Dynasty Warriors: Gundam 2 | Apolly Bay | | |
| 2011 | Dynasty Warriors: Gundam 3 | Kou Uraki | | |
| 2018 | Dead Rivals | Additional voices | | |

=== Film acting ===
| Year | Title | Role | Crew role, Notes | Source |
|---|---|---|---|---|
| 2009 | Malvolio | Malvolio | | |
| 2011 | Shutout | Jim | | |
