= List of Jubei-chan characters =

This is a list of major characters in the anime series Jubei-chan: The Ninja Girl which is created by Akitaro Daichi. The series comprise two television series: The Secret of the Lovely Eyepatch and The Counter Attack of Siberian Yagyuu, both series take place in Hontsuru City.

== Major characters ==
=== Jiyuu Nanohana ===
Nanohana Jiyū (菜ノ花 自由) Voiced by: Hiroko Konishi (Japanese) in Series 1, Yui Horie (Japanese) in Series 2, Melanie Risdon (English)

The main protagonist of the series, Jiyuu Nanohana (菜花 自由, Nanohana Jiyū) is a 14–15-year-old junior high school girl attending a new school at the start of The Secret of the Lovely Eyepatch. She has a bright personality and a close relationship with her father. She is very well rounded which grabs the attention of the boys in her school and local area. Her nickname is Juubei, a reference to the famous Japanese swordsman Yagyuu Juubei. As Yagyuu Juubei, Jiyuu is described as a calculating young swordswoman with a completely different persona, although some of her true self is still shown. Whenever she defeats an enemy, she releases him/her from their hatred on Yagyuu Juubei. Despite her appearance of a petite young high school girl, Jiyuu does have some skills, one of these is the "Yagyuu Shinkageryuu Mutodori", a sword catching skill used to prevent harm on her opponent.

Jiyuu first encountered Koinosuke Odagou, who had been searching for a worthy successor for the Lovely Eyepatch. After her first transformation into Yagyuu Juubei, Jiyuu is targeted by the Ryuujouji clan, a school that has had a grudge on Yagyuu Juubei. Since then, Jiyuu has battled with the Ryuujouji clan and their leader.

The second series starts a year later. Even though Jiyuu has tried to forget the events of the first series, she still feels guilty over what happened to Koinosuke and did not want to wear the Eyepatch anymore. She requests Sai quit being a ghostwriter and write her a love story under his own name. She meets and befriends Freesia Yagyuu, a transfer student from Russia, and later encounters Koinosuke's child, Ayunosuke. At first, she refuses to wear the Eyepatch, but after being attacked by the Siberian Yagyuu and Freesia, who desires the Eyepatch so she can become the true Yagyuu Juubei the Second, she picks up her sword once again.

After being slapped by Sai, Jiyuu falls into a state of confusion, mistaking Mikage as her mother while not recognizing Sai as her father. Later, both Mikage and Sai help her to regain her memories and convince her to stop running from what she must do. Understanding her destiny, she provokes Freesia into an amazing duel and convinces her to stop her goal of vengeance since her spade-shaped Eyepatch has already made her what she wanted to be due to it having the same powers as the Lovely Eyepatch, after which they are attacked by the spirit of Kita Retsusai. Together with Freesia, Jiyuu defeats Retsusai, wiping him out of existence. She feels guilty over what has happened to Ayunosuke, but the last screen shot shows her reuniting with Ayunosuke.

Note: Jiyuu's nickname Jubei if pronounced slowly is Jiyuu-bei.

=== Sai Nanohana ===
Nanohana Sai (菜ノ花 彩) Voiced by: Keiji Fujiwara (Japanese); Byron Close (English)

Sai is Jiyuu's father and a ghostwriter of silly samurai dramas. He is often tormented by the memories of his wife, who died at home by Jiyuu's side when he used to work in his office. After the incident, he promised to be a better father to Jiyuu and subsequently started working at home. Despite his appearance, Sai is in fact talented, he taught Juubei the "Yagyuu Shinkageryuu Mutodori"; as well as disarm Mick and restrain him.

In the first series, Sai is shown as an hilarious character who often gets beaten up for being mistaken as Jiyuu's stalker. He learns the truth about Jiyuu after Mikage tells him. When Jiyuu battled Taiko Daiyu, he lets him possess his own body and fight his daughter. However, Sai still wants to protect her, and aids her in defeating Taiko Daiyu. He is last seen crying after finding out that Mikage is married.

When the events of The Counter Attack of Siberian Yagyuu take place, Sai instead of writing silly samurai dramas, writes a romance novel under his own name at his daughter's request. However, when his old boss begs him to write a samurai novel, he skips his daughter's request. When Mikage later appears as his supervisor, old feelings for her return despite the fact knowing she's already married. Later, Jiyuu finds out about this and left home; Sai is depressed and tricked by Freesia, he slaps Jiyuu the moment she returns which makes her fall into a state of confusion. He apologises to Jiyuu and convinces her to fight again. After the incident, Sai stays home working under Mikage's supervision.

=== Freesia Yagyuu ===
Yagyū Furēshā (柳生フリーシャ) Voiced by: Erina Nakayama (Japanese); Carol-Anne Day (English)

Shinsen Subs offers her name as "Felicia"

Freesia Yagyuu (柳生 フレーシャ, Yagyū Furēsha) is the daughter of Yagyuu Juubei with Trusia. As a child, Freesia witnessed her father's fight with Kita Ressai. During the fight, Freesia fell into the lake where her father and Ressai were fighting and was trapped inside a block of ice for 300 years until it melted. There, she landed in Hokkaido where she was raised by animals. While Jiyuu dons a Heart-shaped Eyepatch, Freesia makes a Spade-shaped Eyepatch and calls up her father's power to transform herself into what she calls the true Yagyuu Juubei the Second.

When she finds out her father has been dead for several centuries and that he left the Lovely Eye Patch to a successor, Freesia believes that she is the rightful owner of the Lovely Eyepatch and came to take it back from Jiyuu. Freesia intends to make Jiyuu suffer as she has suffered, so she tricks Sai into believing that Jiyuu left home because he lied to her about writing the romantic novel under his own name instead of continuing to ghostwrite and that he is a fake father. This makes him slap his own daughter the moment she returns home, putting Jiyuu in a state of confusion. After being done with Jiyuu's part, she plans to finish what her father could not, destroy the Siberian Yagyuu. Under the "False" Jubei, she is good of a swordswoman as Jiyuu, but lacks techniques like Mutodori, in addition, carries the blood lust that her father did not want her to inherit.

While waiting for them, Freesia encounters Jiyuu, who has regained her memories. The two rivals engage one another in a fantastic duel. Jiyuu however, convinces Freesia to stop fighting as she is her friend and that she has already become what she desires thanks to her Spade Eyepatch, proving it by having her use the Mutodori technique to block her sword strike. Seeing that the Lovely Eyepatch wasn't needed to accomplish her goal after all, Freesia finally realizes her mistake and atones for this by fighting alongside Jiyuu to defeat Kita Ressai. She is last seen visiting her father's grave.

=== Koinosuke Odagou ===
Odagō Koinosuke (小田豪 鯉之介) Voiced by: Ryotaro Okiayu (Japanese); Stephen Holgate (S1), Roger Rhodes (S2) (English)

A follower of Yagyuu Juubei, he carries the task of searching for a worthy successor to his master. After 300 years, he met Jiyuu in the modern day Japan. He tries hard to persuade her to wear the Eyepatch which she quickly refuses. He then takes up residence with the Nanohanas and builds his own Koinosuke's hut (doghouse) although Jiyuu said he could sleep in the house he says that he doesn't want her to spoil him. He sometimes transforms into a 300-year-old man for not fulfilling his task. Despite his appearance, Koinosuke states that he has no fighting skills.

His life centers around the mission he was given by his former master and he struggles to find a new life after he Jiyuu tells him. In the end, he is reunited and served his master in the afterlife.

Koinosuke appears briefly in the second series to support Jiyuu and his child.

=== Ayunosuke Odagou ===
Odagō Ayunosuke (小田豪 鮎之介) Voiced by: Ayaka Saito (Japanese); Jasmine Berg (English)

Koinosuke's only child, although having the appearance of a boy, Ayunosuke is actually a girl. Koinosuke entrusts her the Yagyuu's successor task if he fails.

When Jiyuu first blew the "Koinosuke Whistle", Ayunosuke appeared before her eyes and tried to give her the Lovely Eyepatch, Jiyuu quickly escapes and is chased by Ayunosuke. Since then, Ayunosuke has watched over Jiyuu and often gets attacked by Freesia and questioned by Mikage. Eventually, she treats Jiyuu's wounds and continues to convince her to wear the Eyepatch, but she refuses and says that she doesn't want to fight anymore; this makes Ayunosuke exhausted and transforms into a 300-year old body.

Later, she is revived after Jiyuu wears the Eyepatch and witnesses her fight with Freesia. In the end, Ayunosuke is reunited with her father in the afterlife but she is seen at the last screen, sleeping in her father's doghouse.

=== Shirou Ryuujouji ===
Ryūjōji Shirō (竜乗寺 四郎) Voiced by: Tatsuya Nakazaki (Japanese); Jim Ripley (S1), Scott Roberts (S2) (English)

One of the male characters who fell in love with Jiyuu. He first met her when they both wandered around the forest. Despite believing he is the second child, Shirou is in fact the first. He is shown as an enthusiastic young man at the first series. He tries to free Jiyuu from burden of becoming Yagyuu Juubei after found out about this, but fails. He challenges Jiyuu to a duel and defeats her, however, Jiyuu passes out. Shirou is attacked by Hajime, and is found by an old teacher. Then he duels with Hajime and free him from the 300-year old grudge of the Ryuujouji school. While visiting his savior, it turns out that he became possessed by Taiko Daiyu's spirit. Later, he fights Jiyuu and nearly kills her, but Shirou's self overcomes Taiko Daiyu's spirit (after seeing Jiyuu's chest) turns back to his own self.

In the second series, Shirou apparently has lost his fighting spirit (though this returns near the end of the series) and becomes much like an idiot. He joins Bantarou's gang, and often ends up playing their crazy games.

=== Bantarou Sanbonmatsu ===
Sanbonmatsu Bantarō (三本松 番太郎) Voiced by: Yuji Ueda (Japanese); Jonathan Love (English)

Nickname: Chief, skipper, Ban.

Bantarou is the leader of the Ruffians (Unrefined in the English dub) gang of three at Hontsuru Jr. High and heir to the 300 year running Sanbonmatsu sake brewery in Hontsuru city, but he isn't a bright character. He is unquestionably the least intelligent of the trio. Since the first day that he saw Jiyuu riding her bike, he fell in love and being in love means that he would do anything to protect her.

Bantarou's role in The Secret of the Lovely Eyepatch is little, in fact, he protests that he became more unusable in every episodes. In The Counter Attack of Siberian Yagyuu, together with Shirou, they formed a group known as The trio idiots + Shirou and open a campaign to protect Jiyuu.

Trivia: The label on Bantarou's shirt and hat often shows his emotions and actions writing in Kanji.

=== Kozaru & Oozaru ===
Kozaru (小猿) Voiced by: Rie Iwatsubo (Japanese); Bryce Kulak (S1), Mike Thiessen (S2) (English)
Ōzaru (大猿) Voiced by: Chinami Nishimura (Japanese); Dean Bareham (S1), Roger Rhodes (S2) (English)

The two monkey-like members of the Ruffians; Kozaru, the short one, and Oozaru, the taller one both seem to be more intelligent than their leader. They are not shy when it comes to criticizing their leader. In fact, they seem to do it very often and begin doing to Shiro as well, when he joins the group. However, when their leader becomes hurt, they are usually the first ones to react. It's implied that they may be brothers.

=== Shoko Maruyama ===
Maruyama Shōko (丸山 翔子) Voiced by: Harumi Ikoma (Japanese); Mariette Sluyter (English)

Shoko, whose nickname is Maro, is also a new student at Jiyuu's school. She is a cheerful girl who usually recommends that the three new students form a group call the "New Student Lovelies" which is often declined by Sachi. She seems to like older men and has a crush on Jiyuu's father, this however, is not present in the second series.

=== Sachi Toyama ===
Tōyama Sachi (遠山 幸) Voiced by: Kendra Masonchuck (English) in Series 1, Morgan Partridge (English) in Series 2

Sachi is also a new transferred student like Jiyuu. A somewhat stoic figure, she never seems to have much to say nor wants to do anything, and often declines the formation of the "New Student Lovelies", which makes Shoko say that she is no fun. Sachi appears to have some romantic interest with Kozaru.

=== Mikage Tsumura ===
Tsumura Mikage (津村 御影) Voiced by: Reiko Yasuhara (Japanese); Elinor Holt (English)

Nickname: Francoise

Once an assassin sent by the Ryuujouji clan to assassinate Jiyuu. After being defeated and saved by Jiyuu, she devotes herself to protect her. She also looks strikingly similar to Jiyuu's mother; this causes some confusion for Sai, who misses his wife and hasn't felt love in a long time, so he falls on Mikage despite the fact knowing she's married. In The Counter Attack of Siberian Yagyuu, Mikage still strives to protect Jiyuu while working as Sai's editor; in addition, aid Jiyu whenever she is in trouble.

== The Ryuujouji clan ==
The Ryuujouji clan is a school of swordsmanship appears in the first series. After their ancestor Daigo Ryuujouji defeated by Yagyuu Juubei, the school became hating Juubei and only exists for 300 years only to destroy him. Their only goals is to see the destruction of Yagyuu Juubei and to use the power of the Lovely Eyepatch to rule Japan.

=== Dayu Taiko ===
Taiko Dayū (太鼓 太夫) Voiced by: Takashi Matsuyama

Once Daigo Ryuujouji, a samurai who lost to Yagyuu Juubei, after Juubei died, all his hatred and vengeance became the spirit of Taiko Daiyu. Taiko Daiyu survives for 300 years only to see the resurrection of Juubei and to defeat him. Taiko Daiyu has an ability to assimilate people and then make their body and skills his own for the using. He tried to take over Shirou's father, Amon, but was unsuccessful. Instead of this, he forces Amon to give up his first child (Hajime) and raise him to be the successor of the Ryuujouji.

Taiko Daiyu takes the form of a teacher at Hontsuru Jr. High. He treats Shirou's wounds, this makes Shirou thanking him. On the other hand, Taiko Daiyu takes over Shirou's body to finish Yagyuu Juubei for good. He nearly kills Jiyuu, but is foiled by Shirou's spirit, so he possesses Sai instead. Following their fight, he was destroyed by Yagyuu Juubei the Second.

=== Amon Ryuujouji ===
Amon is the father of Shirou and Hajime. Because he didn't take on his ancestor's grudge, he was forced to give up his first child, which turned out to be Hajime. as he died, he told Shirou to save Hajime.

=== Hajime Ryuujouji ===
Ryūjōji Hajime (竜乗寺 ハジメ) Voiced by: Tatsuya Nakazaki (Japanese); Jim Ripley (S1), Scott Roberts (S2) (English)

Shirou's twin brother, and also the head of the Ryuujouji school. Despite this, Hajime is in fact the second child, Hajime knows this and still accepts his role.

In the first series, he appears as a silhouette but makes his actual appearances in episode 4. In addition to achieve his goal, he request his brother to join their ranks, but is refused. He then lures Shirou to duel with Jiyuu only to take the Lovely Eyepatch, but since he does not know its secret, he abducts Jiyuu as well. This makes Shirou fight him but Jiyuu steps in and stops their fight Jiyuu transforms into Yagyuu Juubei the second and provokes him to fight but in one strike Juubei frees him from the 300-year old grudge. Hajime then is recruited to join the Ruffians.

Hajime only makes some briefly appearance in the second series. He has dyed his hair green and also became a hard music fan.

=== Tenryou Tsumura ===
Tsumura Tenryō (津村 天領) Nickname: Mick

Mikage's husband. Like his wife, Tenryou was also defeated by Juubei the Second and devotes himself to fight for the defence of Jiyuu. He became a hewer in The Counter Attack of Siberian Yagyuu.

== Siberian Yagyuu ==
Formerly known as the Kita Yagyuu, the clan were ambushed by the Edo Yagyuu and most of their members were killed. A few survivors, including the leader Kita Ressai, were driven into Siberia. After living several years in Siberia, they changed their name to the Siberian Yagyuu. The leader of the Edo Yagyuu sent Yagyuu Juubei to finish them for good; this eventually led to his duel with Kita Ressai. Three hundred years later, like the Ryuujouji clan, the survivors of the Siberian learned about Yagyuu Juubei's successor and came to Japan to track down Jiyuu Nanohana. Because of their stint in Siberia, Russian is integrated into their language.

=== Kita Retsusai ===
Kita Retsusai (喜多 烈斎) Voiced by: Noah Umholtz

Formerly Yagyuu Kitaretsusai (柳生 喜多烈斎, Yagyū Kitaretsusai), the leader of the Kita Yagyuu later known as Siberian Yagyuu. After being driven out of Japan, Kita Retsusai and his son resided in Siberia. When he caught up with Yagyuu Juubei, mistakenly thinking that he was sent to assassinate him, Kita Retsusai provoked a duel between him and Juubei. At the heat of their battle, Kita Retsusai unleashed his ultimate technique and broke through the ice, drowning Juubei's wife and daughter. He also fell off and vanished in the frozen river; what happened to him afterward is unknown.

Three hundred years later, Kita Retsusai's spirit is resurrected when Kita Furo called up for his powers, and is trapped inside a puppet figure of the Siberian Yagyuu. He reappears to end his battle with Yagyuu Juubei 300 years ago, and now fights with his two successors. He appears in a form of a giant ice monster that is able to reconstitute himself so quickly that Freesia and Juubei have no choice but to fight together as one. Following their duel, he is defeated and finally makes peace with Yagyuu Juubei.

=== Furo Kita ===
Kita Furō (喜多 歩郎) Voiced by: Takeshi Maeda (Japanese); Brendan Hunter (English)

Formerly Yagyuu Kitafurou, he was once an admirer of Yagyuu Juubei, but due to the destruction of their clan, he has changed his heart. Furo lost his right eye at birth and to hide it wears sunglasses, but all of his clan wears glasses due to living in darkness over the years.

For 300 years, he carries his father's grudge and swore to make Juubei pay for banishing his clan. He encounters both Jiyuu and Freesia, and mistakenly thinks that there are two Yagyuu Juubei the Seconds. Furo goes on training; eventually he inherits his father's strength and technique. He soon learns the story of the two Jubeis; as a result, he falls in love with Jiyuu, as she reminds him of the Juubei he admired as a child, while he hates Freesia, whom he sees as the Juubei responsible for the destruction of his clan.

He returns to find Jiyuu in a state of confusion. He tells her that he wants a rematch after finishing Freesia. He duels Freesia but still loses; his body later is trapped inside his father's re-incarnation, an ice monster, and is saved by Jiyuu and Feesia. In the end, Furo is taken care by White Tiger Nizaemon and becomes a police officer.

=== Other Siberian/Kita Yagyuu ===
White Tiger Nizaemon (ホワイトタイガー仁佐衛門, Howaito Taigā Nizaemon)Voiced by: Masashi Yabe (Japanese); Jonathan Love (English)
Tappei Shimodaira (下平 辰平, Shimodaira Tappei)Voiced by: Eiji Takemoto (Japanese); Steve Olson (English)
Sanpei Hamudo (ハム土 三平, Hamudo Sanpei)Voiced by: Hiroshi Shimozaki (Japanese); Michael Shepherd (English)
Monsieur Takahashi (ムッシュ・タカハシ, Musshu Takahashi)Voiced by: Masaki Kawanabe (Japanese); Gerald Matthews (English)
Batten Shiratoya (白戸屋 バッテン, Shiratoya Batten)Voiced by: Hiroyuki Nawada (Japanese); Lucas Gilbertson (English)

The other members of the Siberian Yagyuu consist of Kita Ressai's five most trusted assistants (their names probably changed after living in Siberia) and some henchmen that look like ninjas with sunglasses. Despite their elderly age, they still have some fighting skills left, but Freesia says that they are all eyesore, and they sometimes show their cowardliness after their plans fail.

At the beginning of the series, they and Kita Furo team up (of sort) to defeat Jiyuu. They kidnap Freesia and force Jiyuu to withdraw, the plan however ended in failure with the defeat of Nizaemon. They try to return to Siberia when Freesia states that she will kill them, but also unsuccessful. In the end, the Siberian Yagyuu (with the exception of Nizaemon who had been defeated) follow their master to the afterlife; Retsusai appointing Nizaemon as Kita's retainer.

== Minor characters ==
=== Yagyuu Juubei ===
Voiced by: Yuuki Meguro (Japanese); Tommy James (English)

The legendary Japan swordsman, Yagyuu Juubei (柳生 十兵衛, Yagyū Jūbei) appears briefly in the first series as an elderly man; in the second, he is described as a middle-aged man and also given a little sense of humour.

The second series reveals most of his past, he was sent to assassinate Kita Ressai and the remaining Northern Yagyuu, though he did not wish to carry out the job. During his time in Siberia, he fell in love and had a daughter named Freesia. He later caught up with Kita Ressai who provoked him into a duel and drowned his wife and daughter, and Juubei screamed in agony.

Several years later, Juubei's father decided to get rid of the other Yagyuu styles in the land. This caused some people to be very upset and in attempts to prove they were better, they challenged Juubei and all lost. Thus, the Ryuujouji's grudge was born. Juubei after defeating Daigo Ryuujouji, died and entrusted his disciple Koinosuke the Lovely Eyepatch.

=== Yagyuu Tajima-no-Kami Munenori ===
Yagyuu Munenori (柳生宗矩, Yagyū Munenori), the father of Yagyuu Juubei and the fifth son of the founder of Yagyuu Shinkage-ryuu, Yagyuu Muneyoshi (柳生宗厳, Yagyū Muneyoshi). He was the mastermind who ordered the Edo Yagyuu to attack and destroy Kita Yagyuu, drove Kitaretsusai and his men out of Japan. In the series, Koinosuke considered him as "Tajima-sama".

=== Makoto Nanohana ===
Makoto was Jiyuu's mother who died from a doctor's misdiagnoses. It was because of her death that Sai has been living as an independent writer. She looks a lot like Mikage.

=== Trusia ===
Juubei's Siberian wife and Freesia's mother. She witnessed the duel between her husband and Kita Ressai, and was assumed to have drowned in the lake where her husband and Ressai were dueling.

=== Otome Shirahatamaru ===
Shirahatamaru Otome (白幡多丸乙女) Voiced by: Ayaka Saito (Japanese); Desiree Yow (English)

Otome is a girl who has a serious crush on Shirou. Her aunt runs the Shirahatamaru school where she and her friends Kochou (小蝶, Kochō) and Oochou (大蝶, Ōchō) attend. Although she shows up frequently in the show, she really doesn't do anything that impacts the plot. Kochou and Oochou always follow Otome everywhere she goes and tries to give her encouraging words.

Kochou was seen together with Oozaru in season 1.

=== Mrs. Ryuujouji ===
The Mother of Shirou and Hajime Ryuujouji, and the nurse at Hontsuru Jr. High who cured Bantarou after he was attacked and tried to diagnose Jiyuu. Her name has never been given. She is also one of a few characters that is drawn drastically differently from the rest, as she shares no resemblance to her sons.

=== Ishibashi Tentatsu ===
He is Sai's boss at the time that Makoto died. He scolded Sai for talking to his daughter at work. He begged Sai to write for him in the second series.

=== Sandayu ===
He is the schoolmaster of Hontsuru Jr. High and is also one of Hajime's henchmen. He's not too bright and eventually gives the eye-patch to Jiyuu accidentally.
