= List of Jubei-chan episodes =

This is a list of episodes of the anime series Jubei-chan: The Ninja Girl-The Secret of the Lovely Eyepatch produced by Madhouse. The series first aired on 5 April 1999 and concluded on 28 June 1999. The second series: The Counter Attack of the Siberian Yagyu premiered in 2004.

== Episode list ==
No.	Title	Original release date
1	"The Birth of Yagyu Jubei II"; Transliteration: "Nidaime Yagyū Jūbē Tanjō" (Japanese: 二代目柳生十兵衛誕生)	5 April 1999
Jiyu Nanohana, a fourteen-year-old junior highschool student who attends Hontsuru Jr.High unexpectedly meets Koinosuke Odago, an assistant of Yagyu Jubei who has searched 300 years for a worthy successor for the Lovely Eyepatch. He implores Jiyu to accept the Eyepatch but she steadfastly refuses.
2	"Falling in Love with the Enemy"; Transliteration: "Nanji no Teki ni Horete Ita" (Japanese: 汝の敵に惚れていた)	12 April 1999
The problem between Jiyu and Koinosuke continues as a new assassin arrives to eliminate Yagyu Jubei II.
3	"Men's Hearts Were Swaying"; Transliteration: "Otokogokoro ga Yurete Ita" (Japanese: 男心が揺れていた)	19 April 1999
The conflict continues when two new assassins arrive, takes the form of Jiyu's new teachers. They challenge her to a duel but is badly defeated, but Bantaro is injured during their fight.
4	"The Road of No Return"; Transliteration: "Ato ni wa Modorenu Michi datta" (Japanese: 後には戻れぬ道だった)	26 April 1999
Bantaro was cured by Shiro's mother. As things begin back to normal, Hajime appears and asks Shiro to join their clan; Shiro explains that he has no intentions of doing so, but Hajime reminds him that he knows Shiro has a longing to fight Jubei II and leaves. He then accompanies Jiyu and asks her about the Eyepatch, she says it is nothing and throws it away.
5	"The Enemy Brought a Memory with Them"; Transliteration: "Teki ga Omoide Tsurete Kita" (Japanese: 敵が思い出つれて来た)	3 May 1999
Mikage and her husband are requested to defeat Jubei II, they kidnap both Sai and Koinosuke in order to force Jiyu to give up the Eyepatch in exchange for the hostages. When Mikage puts on the Eyepatch, though, it starts burning her. Jiyu remembers that her mom felt hot before she died and instinctively jumps in and rips the Eyepatch off, leaving a smoky Mikage. Jiyu says that although they look similar, Mikage is not her mom. She transforms and defeat them.
6	"My Next Enemy is Yesterday's Ally"; Transliteration: "Kinō no Mikata ga Teki datta" (Japanese: 昨日の味方が敵だった)	10 May 1999
In order to release Jiyu from the burden of becoming Yagyu Jubei and being targeted by the Ryujoji, Shiro challenges her to a duel. Later, Jiyu meets a Ryujoji assassin, he explains their 300-year-old grudge and goal to her.
7	"She had Grasped the Secret Before She Knew It!"; Transliteration: "Shirazu ni Gokui o Tsukandeta" (Japanese: 知らずに極意を掴んでた)	17 May 1999
Jubei II defeats the assassins. Afterward, Shiro and Jubei II engage in a duel, he cuts off the Eyepatch, but as soon as Jiyu returns to her normal self, she collapses. Bantaro takes her to a doctor while Hajime attacks Shiro, and takes the Eyepatch.
8	"I Attached This Thing to My Head"; Transliteration: "Atama ni Konna no Soete Ita" (Japanese: 頭にこんなの添えていた)	24 May 1999
Jiyu is resting in Shiro's house. Sai tries to cold her down and remembers the memories of his deceased wife.
9	"Dad's Premonition of Love"; Transliteration: "Koi no Yokan no Chichi datta" (Japanese: 恋の予感の父だった)	31 May 1999
Back to Hajime's hideout, he has not discovered the power of the Eyepatch, thus, he orders his men to go get Jiyu. Meanwhile, the Nanohanas is having a party, Mikage appears during the show and tells Jiyu about their changed lives.
10	"This is Where to Make the Effort"; Transliteration: "Doryoku no Shidokoro, Koko datta" (Japanese: 努力のしどころ、ここだった)	7 June 1999
Jiyu along with Koinosuke and the Ruffians are being held hostages, Hajime tortures her friends, forcing her to tell him the power of the Eyepatch. Shiro appears and fights him, Hajime is defeated by Jubei II. When Shiro goes back and thanks the old teacher, it turns out that he became possessed by Taiko Daiyu's spirit.
11	"But the Path Curves Ahead"; Transliteration: "Tokoroga Michi ga Magatteta" (Japanese: ところが道が曲がってた)	14 June 1999
Mikage while exploring the Ryujoji's hideout, was attacked by Shiro/Taiko Daiyu and was heavily injured. Sai finds her as Mikage stumbles out and collapses in front of him. He brings her home, treats her and then hugs her, but Jiyu sees everything and runs off. Mikage tells him to protect Jiyu and that the Ryujoji grudge lives on. As soon as she runs outside, a possessed Shiro appears and attacks her.
12	"I Had Met a Daughter That I Never Knew"; Transliteration: "Shiranai Musume ni Deatteta" (Japanese: 知らない娘に出会ってた)	21 June 1999
The fight between the possessed Shiro and Jubei II continues as Sai tries to stop them. Jubei II however, says that she has to end this grudge and Jiyu's soul will rest in her eternally.
13	"Night Gave Way to a Brand New Day"; Transliteration: "Yo ga Aketara Asa ga Kita" (Japanese: 夜が明けたら朝が来た)	28 June 1999
While Jubei II fights Shiro/Taiko Daiyu, Koinosuke explains everything to the rest. Jubei II is exhausted and nearly killed by Taiko Daiyu, but Shiro takes over his body and holds back the thrust. Jubei defeats him and Taiko Daiyu's spirit leaves the body. She tells everyone that she cannot return when Taiko Daiyu still exists. Sai lets him to take over his body and fights Jubei. During their battle, Sai's spirit jumps out and grab his daughter's spirit while Jubei II destroy Taiko Daiyu. Though they have won the battle, but Koinosuke left. A few days later, the heroes celebrate the formation of The New Student Lovelies, Jiyu looks at the Koinosuke whistle and says she'll blow on it when she wants to see him.
