= Carol-Anne Day =

Canadian voice actress

- Born: March 26, 1986 (age 40); Calgary, Alberta, Canada
- Occupation: Voice actress

Carol-Anne Day (born March 26, 1986) is a Canadian voice actress.

== Filmography ==
=== Western series ===
- The Little Prince - Rosetta (The Planet of the Trainiacs)

=== Anime series ===
- Ceres, The Celestial Legend - Chidori Kuruma
- Betterman - Kaori Sweet Seventeen
- Cardfight!! Vanguard - Misaki Tokura
- Cardfight!! Vanguard G - Misaki Tokura, Chrono Dran
- Deltora Quest - Gla-Thon
- D.I.C.E. - Marsha Rizarov
- Di Gi Charat Nyo! - Rabi~en~Rose / Hikaru Usada
- Doki Doki School Hours - Minako Tominaga
- Dragon Ball - Teenage Chi-Chi, Akane Kimidori, Cookie, Admirer 2, Cutie Blue, Cutie Pink, Cutie Purple, Female Customer, Julie, Mystery Fighter, Nurse, Old Woman, Spectator 2, Spectator A
- Dragon Ball GT - Valse
- Fancy Lala - Chisa Shinohara
- Flame of Recca - Yanagi Sakoshita
- Full Moon o Sagashite - Madoka Wakamatsu
- Future Card Buddyfight - Paruko Nanana, Misaki Tokura (cameo)
- Gintama° - Asaemon Ikeda
- Gregory Horror Show - Cactus Girl
- Hoop Days - Mutsumi Akiyoshi
- Hunter × Hunter 1999 version - Menchi
- Jubei-chan: The Ninja Girl - Freesia Yagyu
- Mobile Fighter G Gundam - Allenby Beardsley
- Mobile Suit Zeta Gundam - Four Murasame
- My-HiME, My-Otome - Mai Tokiha
- Pretty Cure - Regine/Shyla
- Scan2Go - PEL, Pansy, Hebina
- Strawberry Marshmallow - Nobue Itou
- The Law of Ueki - Marilyn Carrey
- Tide-Line Blue - Josie
- Viper's Creed - Sakurako Kariya
- Zoids: Chaotic Century - Fiona/Alisia Lennette
- Zoids: Guardian Force - Fiona/Alisia Lennette

=== Video games ===
- A Hat in Time - Nomads, Cruise Seals
- D.I.C.E. - Marsha Rizarov
- Dynasty Warriors: Gundam 2 - Four Murasame
- Dynasty Warriors: Gundam 3 - Four Murasame
- Gregory Horror Show :Soul Collector - Lost Doll/Cactus Girl
- Inuyasha: The Secret of the Cursed Mask - Kaname Kururugi
- Mega Man Powered Up - Additional Voices
- Mega Man X: Command Mission - Marino
- Mobile Suit Gundam: Gundam vs. Zeta Gundam - Four Murasame
- We Love Golf! - Yuki

=== Film Acting ===
- Malvolio - Viola
- Sympathetic Frequencies (Short) - Rebecca
