= Zoids: Chaotic Century =

Television series

- Zoids: Chaotic Century DVD Volume 1

ゾイド -ZOIDS- (Zoido)
- Genre: Adventure, mecha
- Created by: Tomy
- Anime television series
- Directed by: Takao Kato
- Produced by: Hiroshi Morotomi; Toshihiro Nakazawa
- Written by: Katsuyuki Sumisawa
- Music by: Robert Etoll; Shinsuke Sugiuchi
- Studio: Xebec
- Licensed by: NA: Hasbro, VIZ Media
- Original network: JNN (MBS, TBS)
- English network: AU: Network Ten, Cartoon Network; NZ: Cartoon Network, TV3; US: Cartoon Network (Toonami)
- Original run: September 4, 1999 – December 23, 2000
- Episodes: 67
- Other series
- List of all Zoids series

Zoids: Chaotic Century, simply titled Zoids (ゾイド -ZOIDS-, Zoido) in Japan, is the first of five anime series based on the Zoids range of mecha model kits produced by TOMY. It is loosely adapted from the manga series Kiiju Shinseiki Zoido, which was created by Michiro Ueyama and published in CoroCoro Comic. The series was animated by Xebec, and aired from September 4, 1999, to December 23, 2000, on TBS and Network. Although the first series to be produced for the franchise in Japan, Chaotic Century was the second series to be dubbed and aired in Western nations, following Zoids: New Century. In August 2013, a Blu-ray box set of the series was released in Japan, it optionally came with a limited edition Blade Liger.

== Series background ==
Zoids: Chaotic Century is set in the far reaches of the Milky Way, on the planet Zi. On Zi, there are metallic life-forms known as Zoids, which possess powerful fighting capabilities. Throughout the recent history of the series, Zoids have been used as weapons in an ongoing war between the Helic Republic and Guylos Empire.

The setting of Chaotic Century is a few years after the most recent war between the Helic Republic and the Guylos Empire. The two nations are currently observing a ceasefire, although ambushes and minor assaults are initiated by both sides, and tensions are high after it is revealed that one or both sides may have access to the ancient technology of the Ancient Zoidians.

The series follows the story of Van Flyheight, a teenage boy who discovers a mysterious girl named Fiona (Fine in the Japanese version), and an Organoid named Zeke (Sieg). Van discovers that Zeke has the ability to merge with a Zoid, increasing its fighting power, and with that skill, Van and Fiona set off to discover the secrets of Fiona's past. During their travel, they meet up with a transporter named Moonbay, and a mercenary named Irvine, who initially thwarts their progress, but eventually begins traveling with them. As they travel across the Helic Republic, a new war breaks out, with the group of travelers being caught in the middle of it.

== Plot ==
Prior to the series there was war between the Guylos Empire and the Helic Republic which ended in a ceasefire. The series starts with Van being chased by a group of bandit Zoid pilots and discovering the organoid Zeke in ruins near his village. Zeke revives an abandoned Shield Liger, which Van uses to fight off the bandits. Returning to the same ruins, he discovers Fiona, a mysterious girl with no memories. When Van returns to his village, the gang of bandits return and try to take Zeke from Van. To keep his village safe, he leaves with Fiona. Van hears Fiona speak of something called Zoid Eve and decides to help her find it in hopes that it will help her memories return. Shortly afterwards, they meet Irvine. Initially, Van and Irvine are enemies because of Irvine's attempts to steal Zeke, but they end up traveling together when they meet Moonbay. Van has to travel with Moonbay because she blew up her cargo to help him.

Later, the four arrive at one of the Republic's army bases and help to stop an invasion by the Empire orchestrated by Prozen. Afterward, Van, Fiona, Irvine, and Moonbay try to stay out of the war. However, Van is drawn back in when he meets the Guylos ace pilot Raven, quickly developing a grudge after witnessing Raven's brutal nature. They fight, but Van proves to be no match for Raven. Van later challenges Raven again, losing a second time, and Zeke suffers near-fatal damage, but Van manages to save him. During this time the Imperial army is marching farther and farther into Republican territory but are eventually stopped by the Republic's new weapon, the Gojulas. Van and the others eventually reach the Republic's capital in hopes of finding information about Zoid Eve, but are caught up in the Empire's surprise assault on the city. During the battle Van is finally able to defeat Raven, the latter destroying his own Zoid as he attempts to pierce the Liger's energy shield.

The war is stopped when the Empire's crown prince Rudolph orders a ceasefire, but Prozen refuses to give up on conquering the Republic and attempts to assassinate the prince. His attempt is foiled by the bandits Rosso and Viola, who kidnap the prince for ransom. However, Prozen announces that the prince is dead, seizing control of the Empire for himself. Prozen finds the remnants of legends about an apocalyptically powerful Zoid, the Death Saurer, and attempts to clone it. As a byproduct of the cloning research, the Geno Saurer is created and given to Raven. Raven uses the Geno Saurer to destroy Van's Shield Liger, but Zeke and Fiona later revive the Shield Liger as the Blade Liger.

It is revealed that Fiona is actually an ancient Zoidian that existed before humans came to the planet Zi. Rudolph joins Van and his friends, who try to take him to the Empire's capital Guygalos to stop Prozen from taking over the Empire and restarting the war. When Rudolph resurfaces, Prozen claims that he is an imposter, manipulating the imperial forces into fighting against the prince and his friends. Eventually, Van faces Raven again, and after an extremely difficult battle destroys the Geno Saurer. Raven survives thanks to his organoid Shadow.

Van and his friends succeed in returning Rudolph to the capital, but Prozen unleashes his cloned Death Saurer. The Death Saurer goes on a rampage and almost destroys the capital, with the joint forces of the Empire and Republic powerless to stop it. Van is able to destroy the Death Saurer using what he learned fighting against the Geno Saurer. Prozen, riding the Death Saurer, appears to be killed in the process. Rudolph is then crowned the emperor and peace finally begins between the Empire and Republic, but Van and Fiona don't take part in the celebration and instead leave to find Zoid Eve.

=== Guardian Force ===
Two years after the Death Saurer's defeat, Van is shown to have joined the Helic army. On a trip home he meets up with Fiona, now a researcher for the military, and the two decide to try to find the Zoid Eve again. Van and Fiona are assigned to a joint task force, the Guardian Force, formed by the Empire and Republic. They work with Thomas Schubaltz of the Empire to fight against those who threaten the peace between the nations. The Guardian Force faces a number of antagonists. Most notably, they have multiple encounters with two mysterious individuals who have organoids, Reese and Hiltz. Raven also resurfaces, piloting various Zoids until he obtains a new Geno Saurer that later evolves into the Geno Breaker. The Guardian Force's members clash with Reese, Raven, Hiltz, and other criminals a number of times.

Eventually it is revealed that Reese and Hiltz are working to awaken a mysterious Zoid known as the Death Stinger, a very large and extremely powerful Zoid capable of destroying cities with its charged particle beam. Hiltz uses the Death Stinger to destroy the Republic's capital, despite a massive mobilization of Imperial and Republican military forces. The remaining forces gather and awaken the Ultrasaurus, a giant mobile fortress Zoid meant to be used as a last resort. The Ultrasaurus is fitted with the gravity cannon, an immense weapon nearly as large as the Ultrasaurus itself.

Hiltz continues his campaign of destruction across the continent. The Ultrasaurus pursues, and Van, Irvine, and Thomas close in to pin down the Death Stinger for the gravity cannon. They successfully hit the Death Stinger with the gravity cannon's third and final shot, crushing it. Its Zoid core shuts down and the Zoid begins to turn into stone. However, Hiltz's organoid Ambient appears and fuses with the Death Stinger, resurrecting it. Van and friends make headway against the still-weakened Death Stinger, but Hiltz, the Death Stinger, and Fiona all suddenly dissolve into light.

Fiona materializes before the Dark Kaiser, revealed to be Prozen merged with the Death Saurer's Zoid core. He manipulates Fiona to open the doors to the Ancient Zoidian city of Evopolis, where the Zoid Eve is located. Fiona regains her memories and explains that the Zoid Eve is the source of life for all Zoids. Zoids initially brought great prosperity, but some turned them into tools for war. The Death Saurer was created to end all wars, but instead began to destroy everything. The Zoidians could not bring themselves to destroy the Zoid Eve, which would end the life of all Zoids, so they sealed it away along with the Death Saurer's body.

Hiltz and the Death Stinger re-materialize in front of Van, who is heading toward Fiona. Van faces Hiltz, aided by Ambient, without his own organoid Zeke. He astounds Hiltz by out-fighting the more powerful Zoid. Van and the Death Stinger arrive at Evopolis, and Prozen demands that the Death Stinger merge with him into the Death Saurer. However, the core instead absorbs him. Hiltz and the Death Stinger merge with Death Saurer core, bringing the monster back to life. The awakened Death Saurer is much more powerful than the incomplete clone that was previously defeated. The combined forces of the military, Van, Raven, Reese, and a fourth gravity cannon shell are unable to even harm it. The Death Saurer and Hiltz are finally stopped by firing the Blade Liger out of the gravity cannon like a bullet, piercing the Death Saurer's core, critically damaging it and killing Hiltz once and for all. After the destruction of the Death Saurer, Planet Zi lives in peace.

== Characters ==
(All characters are referred to by their names in the English dub)

- Van Flyheight - Van is a fourteen year old (at the beginning of the show) orphan of the previous war between the Republic and Empire. His home is the Wind Colony, a village just within the borders of the Helic Republic. Van has an older sister, Maria Flyheight, who is in her late teens. Their father, Major Daniel "Dan" Flyheight, was a pilot with the Republican Army, using a Command Wolf called Zeke. He was killed defending the Wind Colony from an Imperial attack when Van was nine. At the start of the series, Van is chased into some ruins by a bandit named Bol. He then finds two capsules in the ruin. Van opens one to find an Organoid, whom he names Zeke after his father's zoid. He then fights off the bandits in a Shield Liger, which was brought back to life by Zeke. Van then opens up the second capsule, and finds a girl, who he names Fiona. Van then starts a journey to find Fiona's memories, and becomes caught up in a new war, and a plot to take over Zi. Van is a bit dense to start with, but is loyal to his companions and has a good heart. His open nature means that many people are attracted to him, and he enjoys a good challenge. He pilots a Shield Liger, a lion type Zoid that can deploy a shield in front of itself. It later evolves into a Blade Liger, which gives it a pair of laser-edged blades capable of cutting through all but the densest of enemy armor. His favorite food is mentioned as papaya. Throughout the course of the series, Van and Fiona fall in love. Voiced by: Daisuke Kishio (Japanese); Matthew Erickson (English)
- Fiona Elisi Linette - Fiona is young girl awakened from stasis by Van. She suffers from severe amnesia, and is unable to remember anything but the name "Fiona". Van gives her this as her new name, and the two set off to discover who she is. As her memories return, it is learned that her full name is Elisi Linette, and that she is one of the last members of the Ancient Zoidian race. Her driving goal is to discover something known as the 'Zoid Eve', supposedly the source of all Zoids' power. Although a bit naive at first (walking past bandits to untie her friends), she matures over time and eventually serves as Doctor D.'s brilliant assistant. While she and Van had somewhat of a rocky start, the two would grow close, and form a bond. It is shown that Fiona and Van develop romantic feelings for one another. Later in the series, Irvine points out Fiona's love for Van. Voiced by: Makiko Ohmoto (Japanese); Carol-Anne Day (English)
- Zeke - Zeke is an organoid dragon, a small Zoid imbued with many powers. Awakened by Van, Zeke is named after the Command Wolf piloted by Van's father. Zeke's primary ability is to fuse himself with another Zoid, increasing its combat potential dramatically. Zeke is able to use this ability to resurrect destroyed Zoids, and to evolve Zoids into more powerful forms. Voiced by: Takuma Suzuki (Japanese); Dave Pettitt (English)
- Irvine - Irvine is an eighteen-year-old mercenary, and the "tough guy" of the series. Initially interested in capturing Zeke, he later joins Van, Moonbay, Zeke, and Fiona after losing this desire. Although cold-hearted in appearance, Irvine shows a soft side on more than one occasion. He is a skilled pilot, who uses a modified Command Wolf with a powerful long-range rifle. When his Command Wolf is severely damaged, its combat data is transferred into an experimental Zoid, the Lightning Saix, which uses extreme speed to overwhelm the opponent. While he wears an eye patch, he has full function of both his eyes, and uses the eye patch as a camera. Voiced by: Keiji Fujiwara (Japanese); Mark Gatha (English)
- Moonbay - Moonbay is a trader, who often smuggles weapons using the Gustav, an armored insect Zoid capable of pulling 250 tons of cargo. She is considered to be a free-spirited individual, who is not afraid to speak her mind. Although she appears greedy and selfish initially, Moonbay is a good person. She does like to sing, although she rarely stays on key. Voiced by: Kumiko Watanabe (Japanese); Onalea Gilbertson (English)
- Raven - Raven is the top pilot of the Guylos Empire, adopted by Prozen after his parents, Zoid researchers, were killed by the Organoid Ambient. He is selected for his prodigious piloting abilities, which are complemented by the Organoid, Shadow. Raven is extremely anti-social and reserved, and holds a deep dislike of all Zoids. He considers Van to be his rival, and swears not to rest until Van has been killed by his hand. Raven pilots a Zaber Fang, which is destroyed in a battle with Van. He then pilots a Genosaurer which is destroyed by Van in another battle. It is replaced by a prototype Genosaurer, which later evolves into the powerful Geno Breaker. Voiced by: Mitsuki Saiga (Japanese); Scott Hendrickson (English)
- Admiral Gunther Prozen - Gunther is the main villain of the series. He is the Regent of the Guylos Empire, an Admiral in the Guylos military, and the second in line for the throne of Guylos. Prozen arranges for Prince Rudolph, next in line for the throne, to be kidnapped and assassinated so that he can seize power after Emperor Zeppelin's suspicious death. He plans to use the Death Saurer to take total control of the world. He is believed to be killed after his Death Saurer is destroyed, but is shown to have survived as the Dark Kaiser. Voiced by: Hōchū Ōtsuka (Japanese); Dave Kelly (English)
- Hiltz - Hiltz is an Ancient Zoidian with a red Organoid named Ambient. His driving goal is to restore Zoidians to power, even if all humans have to die to do so. He pilots the Death Stinger and later merges with the Ultimate Death Saurer. Hiltz is the main antagonist of Zoids Guardian Force, and arguably the entire series as his arc is tied to Fiona's past and the quest for the Zoid Eve. He is killed in the final episode when Van is fired through the gravity cannon and penetrates the Ultimate Death Saurer. Voiced by: Takahiro Sakurai (Japanese); Scott Roberts (English)
- Rease - Rease is an Ancient Zoidian with a blue Organoid named Specula. She pilots a Double Sworder, and later upgrades to an advanced "Psycho" Genosaurer which was developed based on the data of Raven's Geno Breaker. She and her Organoid both possess psychic abilities, and she often uses psychological warfare and mind-control to disable her enemies. While she is first an ally of Hiltz, she changes sides after she finds out Hiltz had been using her all along. She appears to have some feelings for Raven, as she does help him come to terms with his past. Voiced by: Noriko Hidaka (Japanese); Mariette Sluyter (English)
- Dr. D - Dr. D. is a self-confessed mad scientist once employed by the Republican Army as a Zoid researcher. He is considered Zi's foremost expert on anything Zoid or Organoid related, and enjoys hanging around with Van and his group. His attitude and demeanor irritates Van and Irvine, but D.'s knowledge comes in handy on several occasions. Voiced by: Dave Pettitt
- Prince Rudolph Zeppelin III - Rudolph is the grandchild of Emperor William Zeppelin. Rudolph is placed into the care of Van by Rosso and Viola, former waste gangsters turned bodyguards. Van agrees to help return Rudolph to the Guylos Empire capital, Guygalos, and to teach the boy how to pilot a Zoid properly. Although Rudolph's identity is initially kept hidden from Van and his friends, Doctor D. soon reveals the truth about the Crown Prince. Rudolph is an eager, friendly person, who wishes to be able to emulate Van in piloting skill. Rudolph is quite naive and prefers reasoning over fighting, even with Raven and Prozen. He also deeply cares for the Guylos Empire and hates seeing others around him hurt. Voiced by: Tomoko Ishimura (Japanese); Elinor Holt (English)
- Karlton "Karl" Lichen Schubaltz - Karl is one of the Guylos Empire's greatest Zoid pilots. Karl is an honorable fighter, and wishes to see peace between the Republic and Empire as opposed to total destruction of both sides. He has a younger brother, Thomas, who doesn't appear until Guardian Force. He both loathes and distrusts Prozen, though he respects the command chain, and so he reluctantly follows orders. Initially a major, he is later promoted to the rank of colonel. Karl Schubaltz pilots the Dark Horn and the Iron Kong, as well as a custom Zaber Fang. Voiced by: Yuji Ueda (Japanese); Jonathan Love (English)
- Thomas Richard Schubaltz - Thomas is the younger brother of Karl Schubaltz, and pilot of the Dibison. He excels at technical tasks, and is the creator of the BEEK AI unit, which can be installed into a Zoid, and communicates through a series of beeps. When he first meets Fiona, he develops a huge crush on her. This serves as somewhat of a gag, as Thomas is shown to compete with Van for Fiona's feelings (though neither Fiona nor Van pay heed to this). Voiced by: Kentarō Itō (Japanese); Ryan Luhning (English)
- Robert "Rob" Herman - Robert is the commander-in-chief of the Red River Unit at the Red River base bordering Imperial territory. He is also the son of both the Republic's former and current Presidents, but he is a confident soldier who does not appear to rely on the influence of his family in order to benefit himself. Instead, he prefers to perform his duties and to earn his rank in the army on his own. In fact, in one of the episodes, it is hinted that he is so detached from his familial ties that he has not called his mother, the current President of the Republic, "Mom" in several years, instead addressing her by her proper title as any other soldier would. The Zoids he has been seen piloting most often are a Pteras and a Gordos. He has also been seen piloting a Gojulas and a Shield Liger from time to time. Voiced by: Jin Horikawa (Japanese); Kurtis Sanheim (English)
- DJ O'Connell - DJ is the second-in-command to Robert Herman, and most commonly pilots a Command Wolf and Pteras. His loyalty is a notable character trait, as he appears quite upset when Herman is missing in action, leading him to accept the assistance of Van, Moonbay, Irvine, Fiona and Zeke (for a price). Voiced by: C. Adam Leigh

== Zoids ==
=== Main Zoids ===
The central Zoids are those of the main characters. They are as follows:

- Van's Shield Liger and Blade Liger
- Moonbay's Gustav
- Irvine's Command Wolf and Lightning Saix
- Thomas's Dibison
- Raven's Zaber Fang, Geno Saurer, and Geno Breaker

=== Helic Zoids ===
The Helic Republic uses a wide selection of Zoids for combat use. Most of the time, the Helic Zoids are normally underpowered, but are either faster than Guylos Zoids or used by the masses. The most commonly seen Helic Zoids are the Godos, Gordos, Gojulas, Command Wolf, Storm Sworder, Shield Liger, Pteras, Gustav, Gun Sniper, and Guysack. A few Guysacks and Godos are seen using mining equipment and used for civilian purposes. Although never shown in use by the Republic, the Dibison is also a Helic Republic zoid stated when Lieutenant Thomas Schubaltz explained to Van that he got his Dibison through the Arms Exchange between the Helic Republic and the Guylos Empire.

=== Guylos Zoids ===
The Guylos Empire uses a smaller selection of Zoids for combat. Whereas the Helic Zoids are faster, the Guylos Zoids are stronger and heavier-armored. The most commonly seen Zoids of the Guylos forces are the Red Horn, Dark Horn, Zaber Fang (Sabre Tiger), Molga, Redler, Black Redler, Whale King, Rev Raptor, Gustav, and Iron Kong.

== Organoids ==
Organoids are a special type of Zoid left over from the time of the Ancient Zoidians. They commonly resemble Japanese dragons (i.e. three claws on each "hand" and "foot"), and are around the size of a small horse. Organoids are unique to Chaotic Century and Guardian Force, and do not appear in any other series (though they appear in some games). Organoids have the ability to fuse with other Zoids, either healing them, making them more powerful, evolving them, etc. They also have the memories of their Zoidian partners stored inside of them. In ancient times, all Zoidians were paired with an organoid.

Only four organoids appear in the series: Zeke, Shadow, Ambient, and Specula.

== Theme songs ==
Opening

1. Wild Flowers by Ramar (Mean Records)

Ending

1. Song for... by Dear (Myriad Records)
2. Chase by Develop=Frame
3. Into Yourself by Transtic Nerve (Massive Recording)
4. Your Song by Earth
