= D.I.C.E. =

Television series

- D.I.C.E. Complete Season DVD featuring Jet Siegel and Motoraptor.
- Genre: Mecha, action
- Anime television series
- Directed by: Jun Kamiya
- Produced by: Carles McCarter; Yukinao Shimoji
- Written by: Hiro Masaki
- Studio: Xebec
- Original network: Animax
- English network: CA: YTV; US: Cartoon Network (Toonami)
- Original run: United States; January 1, 2005 – December 10, 2005; Dubbed: Japanese; December 5, 2005; – September 19, 2006
- Episodes: 40

D.I.C.E. (DNA Integrated Cybernetic Enterprises) is an original anime series produced by Bandai Entertainment, Xebec, and Studio Galapagos (computer animation). Originally made for the United States, with recording by Vancouver's Ocean Productions' Blue Water Studios branch in Calgary. the series was first shown on Cartoon Network in the US, then YTV in Canada. On December 12, 2005, the Japanese version was shown on Animax under the title Dinobreaker (ディノブレイカー, Dinobureikā). On January 7, 2006, the Tagalog version premiered on Hero TV. ABS-CBN network followed by broadcasting the series in Tagalog on January 28, 2006. As of October 31, 2009, D.I.C.E. has already run for a total of 15 full runs in the 4 channels which broadcast D.I.C.E. in the Philippines.

== Story ==
In the Sarbylion galaxy, there is an organization named D.I.C.E. (an acronym for DNA Integrated Cybernetic Enterprises) to help those in need. Among them, F-99 is the only unit composed entirely of children. Often being trivialized by their young ages, DICE member use RADOC to summon the Gild suit (Gild jacket) to help them to gain some respect among suspicious locals. When a problem arises, DICE is called to the rescue. With their Dinobreakers which can transform from Vehicle Mode to Dino Mode, the DICE team can always get the job done.

D.I.C.E. is sometimes compared with Thunderbirds, not only because of the rescue theme, but also the GTR catchphrase, which means "Good to Roll" (some prefer it as "got the request").

In the Japanese version of the show, D.I.C.E. stands for "Dinobreakers Integrated Cybernetic Enterprises."

== Characters ==
=== D.I.C.E. members ===
==== Fortress F-99 ====
Among D.I.C.E., the F-99 is run by children, specifically orphans. It has been said that all of them grew up in a time of war and that their families were victims of it.

Jet Siegel (ジェット・シーゲル, Jetto Shīgeru)
Voiced by: Daisuke Sakaguchi (Japanese); Jeffrey Watson (English)
A hot-headed pilot who always rushes into danger with little or no forethought. Despite his hot temper, Jet has a strong moral sense and isn't afraid to take risks to rescue those in need. His fierce competitive streak often leads to friction with his teammates. Jet's Dinobreaker is Motoraptor. (Age: 12) (Red)
Tak Carter (タック・カーター, Takku Kātā)
Voiced by: Susumu Chiba (Japanese); Scott Roberts (English)
Captain of F-99. As the second oldest member of the team, he is looked upon by his other teammates as an older brother. A well-respected and capable leader, Tak always stays calm and decisive even under enormous pressure. In episode 8, it was hinted that he and Marsha are dating. Tak's Dinobreaker is Dimetrover. (Age: 15) (Yellow)
Robert Clapice (ロベール・クラピッシュ, Robēru Kurapisshu)
Voiced by: Noriaki Sugiyama (Japanese); Brendan Hunter (English)
Described best as "a pretty-boy pilot who is always concerned about his looks." As the pilot of the only flight-capable Dinobreaker HoverPtera, Robert is often sent to the front lines to scout the situation. Though Robert and Jet always compete over everything, they also make the best partners on the DICE F-99 team. It is shown often throughout the season that he is close friends with both Sam and Marco. (Age: 12) (Purple)
Marco Rocca (マルコ・ロッカ, Maruko Rokka)
Voiced by: Shinji Kawada (Japanese); Robert Scott Henrickson (English)
Jet's buddy in orphanage and a close friend of Robert. Always complaining about something, especially how cramped his cockpit is, Marco and his Dinobreaker Monocrawler are often assigned to heavy-duty tasks such as demolitions and heavy lifting. Despite his constant gripes, Marco always gets the job done. He can be relied on to solve tough situations and often remains calm and in control in bad situations. (Age: 12) (Blue)
Puffy Angel (パフィ・エンジェル, Pafi Enjieru)
Voiced by: Akeno Watanabe (Japanese); Caitlynne Medrek (English)
Holds the position of data analysis expert on board F-99. She sees Marsha as an older sister figure and happens to be a bit of a shop-a-holic. She is sometimes temperamental and hates Jet to the core, however in the last episode of Season 2, when Jet was commissioned in the hospital after the final battle with the Immortal Pharaoh, she watched over and cared for him every day until he recovered, hinting that she has deeper feelings for him. Puffy can also guild up, but does not have a Dinobreaker except in the video game where she owns Hovertap. (Age: 12) (Pink)
Sam N'Dool (サム・ンドゥール, Samu N'Dūru)
Voiced by: Megumi Matsumoto (Japanese); Zoe Slusar (English)
A mechanical expert and another close friend of Robert. Though the youngest of the team, he is also referred to the brains of bunch. Sam drives the Dinobreaker Paratricar. He also prays in his free time and for the safety of his crew-mates (Age: 11) (Green)
Chao Lee (チャオ・リー, Chiyao Rī)
Voiced by: Kenta Miyake (Japanese); Lucas Gilbertson (English)
Both the pilot and navigator of F-99. He is the giver of advice to anyone who seems to be troubled or upset, and is willing to speak out against his captain if he has to. (Age: 17) (Brown)
Marsha Rizanov (マーシャ・リザノフ, Māshya Rizanofu)
Voiced by: Yumi Kakazu (Japanese); Carol Anne Day (English)
Serves as second-in-command of D.I.C.E. F-99. In episode 8, it was hinted that her and Tak are dating. Marsha can also guild up, but does not have a Dinobreaker except in the video game where she owns Ankylorover. She is seen by all of her teammates as an older sister. (Age: 14) (Teal)
Randall
A tall blue android serving under DICE F-99.
Gelati
A short yellow android serving under D.I.C.E. F-99, often serves as Jet and Puffy's punching bag.
Moke (モーク, Mōku)
Chao Lee's pet. When Moke's parents were killed by poachers, Chao took on the responsibility of raising Moke. Moke only speaks Chao's name.
Clo Zan (クロ = ザン, Kuro Zan)
Voiced by: Cole Howard
A new member from the Heron universe who is introduced in the second season.

==== Other D.I.C.E. members ====
Pike (パイク, Paiku)
Voiced by: Mark Gatha
A D.I.C.E. E-01 member. He always appears in his stylish hat even when piloting his Dinobreaker HoverRhynchus, and loves to brag about how it was tailor-made. In episode 7, Chao's pet moke stole his hat and ran through a dinner half naked to get it back. Pike was referred to as Spike in the English dub. (Age:25) (Light Blue)
Macchiatto (マキアート)
A member from D.I.C.E. Fortress C-01, His Dinobreaker is Lambeotracker. (Age:23) (Orange)
Commander Sid
Voiced by: Jonathan Love
Commander of the D.I.C.E. F station. His Dinobreaker is Mototyranno. (Green)
Dark Phantom (ダーク・ファントム, Dāku Fantomu)
Voiced by: Jonathan Love
Dark Phantom (known in the English dub as Phantom Knight) is a mysterious "stranger" who always get into Jet's way and steals items related to the long-lost Heron civilization with his crew of space pirates. In episode 25, it was revealed that Dark Phantom is Jet's long lost brother Zack. The Dark Phantom is treated in a similar manner to "Racer X" from Speed Racer. His Dinobreaker is Knight Rex.
Body of Elders
A group of 12 men that are governing D.I.C.E. since its beginning. They make executive decisions for the organization. The Body of Elders also staged a conspiracy involving implanting wormhole detectors to Dinobreakers and use them to find Heron's Gate, kidnapping D.I.C.E. executives, and staging war between D.I.C.E. factions in an attempt to achieve immortality. They were presumably dead when they were trying to pass the temporarily closed Heron's Gate.

=== Heron Knights ===
The Heron Knights first appeared in Episode 27, during the show's second season. They are the guardians of the Heron Universe.

=== B-D.I.C.E. (B CORP) ===
B-D.I.C.E. is an organization that tries to discredit DICE by posing as DICE members. Without a convincing disguise, their tricks are easily uncovered. The famous slogan is We are B-D.I.C.E., but that doesn't mean we're nice!

Club
The taller of the Poker brothers.
Diamond
The shorter of the Poker brothers.
Laughing Boy
A B-DICE member that dressed like the Joker from poker.
Luigi
A Sitanian archaeologist working with B-D.I.C.E. to find the Sitan Kaleidoscope. After he had found the kaleidoscope, he and his former associate Falco were transported back in time, and was never seen again.

=== Dinobreakers ===
Dinobreakers are transformable mechanical creature used by a Dinorider. Dinobreaker transforms by calling it with the appended phrase "libertize." To keep their wild personalities under control, they only eat refined pellets. Feeding a Dinobreaker with raw pellet is a recipe that guarantees troubles! Among the Dinobreakers are:

Motoraptor (モトラプター, Motoraputā)
Jet's Dinobreaker. Its vehicle form is a motorcycle and its dinosaur form is a Velociraptor.
Dimetrover (ディメトローダー, Dimetorōdā)
Tak's Dinobreaker. Its vehicle form is a race car and its dinosaur form is a Dimetrodon.
HoverPtera (ホバープテラ, Hobāptera)
Robert's Dinobreaker. Its vehicle mode is a hovercraft and its dinosaur form is a Pteranodon.
Monocrawler (モノクローラー, Motokurōrā)
Marco's Dinobreaker. Its vehicle form is a drill tank and its dinosaur form is a Monoclonius.
Paratricar (パラトライカー, Paratorikā)
Sam's Dinobreaker. Its vehicle form is a car and its dinosaur form is a Parasaurolophus. Paratricar is capable of becoming invisible.
HoverRhynchus (ホバーリンクス, Hobārinkusu)
Captain Spike's Dinobreaker. Its vehicle form is a hovercar dinosaur form is a Rhamphorhynchus.
Lambeotracker (ランベオトラッカー, Ranbeotorakkā)
Macchiatto's Dinobreaker. Its vehicle form is a car and its dinosaur form is a Lambeosaurus.
Motorex (モトレックス, Motorekkusu)
Commander Sid's Dinobreaker. Its vehicle form is a motorcycle and its dinosaur form is a Tyrannosaurus.
Knight Rex (ナイトレックス, Naito Rekkusu)
Phantom Knight's Dinobreaker. Its vehicle form is a race car and its dinosaur form is a Tyrannosaurus.
Motostinger (モトスティンガー, Motosutingā)
A mysterious purple Dinobreaker. Its dinosaur form is a mutant Velociraptor. Motostinger first appeared in episode 12 with its mysterious rider (a robot programmed to destroy Phantom Knight). Unlike other Dinobreakers, it does not need a phrase to transform. Motostinger also has several other "features" not common to D.I.C.E. Dinobreakers.
Tortoise Fortress
Chao's Dinobreaker. It usually assumes the form of Fortress F-99. In critical times, it can be used to combat giant creatures.
Hovertap
Puffy's Dinobreaker in the video game. Its dinosaur form is a Tupuxuara.
Ankylorover
Marsha's Dinobreaker. Its dinosaur form is an Ankylosaurus.

=== Knightbreakers ===
Knightbreakers are transforming mechanical creatures used by the Heron Knights. They are believed to be evolved Dinobreakers. Unlike Dinobreakers, they do not have a vehicle mode. Instead, they have a dino mode and a guardian mode which is humanoid. This transformation is triggered when a Heron Knight says the phrase "Knightbreak" and merges with the Knightbreaker.

Knight Pharaoh (ナイトファラオ, Naito Farao)
Its dinosaur form is a Spinosaurus.
Knight Raptor (ナイトラプター, Naito Raputā)
Its dinosaur form is a Velociraptor.
Knight Stego (ナイトステゴ, Naito Sutego)
Its dinosaur form is a Stegosaurus.
Knight Archaeo (ナイトアルカエオ, Naito Arukaeo)
Its dinosaur form is a Archaeopteryx.
Knight Pterx (ナイトプテルクス, Naito Puterekusu)
Its dinosaur form is a Archaeopteryx.

== Episodes ==
| No. | Title | Directed by | Written by | Storyboarded by | Original release date | English air date |
|---|---|---|---|---|---|---|
| 1 | "SOS DICE! Bio Plant's Great Collapse"; Transliteration: "SOS daisu! Baiopuranto daihōkai" (Japanese: SOSダイス！ バイオプラント大崩壊) | Jun Kamiya | Jun Kamiya | Shin Katagai | December 5, 2005 | January 1, 2005 |
| 2 | "Invade the Pirate Planet!"; Transliteration: "Kaizoku wakusei ni shin'nyū seyo!" (Japanese: 海賊惑星に侵入せよ！) | Naoyoshi Kusaka | Masahiko Shiraishi | Naoyoshi Kusaka | December 12, 2005 | January 8, 2005 |
| 3 | "Get Through the Plasma Blizzard!"; Transliteration: "Purazuma burizādo o kirinukero!" (Japanese: プラズマブリザードを切り抜けろ！) | Jun Takahashi | Ryō Tamura | Jun Takahashi | December 19, 2005 | January 15, 2005 |
| 4 | "Time Limit! Comet Blast Plan"; Transliteration: "Taimu rimitto! Suisei bakuha keikaku" (Japanese: タイムリミット！ 彗星爆破計画) | Jun Takahashi | Hiro Masaki | Jun Takahashi | December 26, 2005 | January 22, 2005 |
| 5 | "Catch the High-Speed Monster!"; Transliteration: "Kōsoku no kaibutsu o toraero!!" (Japanese: 高速の怪物を捕えろ！！) | Naoyoshi Kusaka | Takao Kato | Takao Kato | January 10, 2006 | January 29, 2005 |
| 6 | "Go, Raptor! Win the Grand Prix!"; Transliteration: "Gō! Raputā! Guranpuri o kimero!" (Japanese: ゴー！ ラプター！ グランプリを決めろ！) | Naoyoshi Kusaka | Naoko Marukawa | Naoyoshi Kusaka | January 17, 2006 | February 5, 2005 |
| 7 | "Challenge to the Furthest Stars!"; Transliteration: "Saihate no hoshi e no chōsen!" (Japanese: 最果ての星への挑戦！) | Naoyoshi Kusaka | Kenichi Araki | Naoyoshi Kusaka | January 24, 2006 | February 12, 2005 |
| 8 | "Five Seconds to Interstellar War"; Transliteration: "Seikan sensō 5-byō mae" (Japanese: 星間戦争5秒前) | Shin Katagai | Hiro Masaki | Shin Katagai | January 31, 2006 | February 19, 2005 |
| 9 | "Labyrinth of the Relic Planet"; Transliteration: "Iseki no hoshi no rabirinsu" (Japanese: 遺跡の星のラビリンス) | Naoyoshi Kusaka | Kenichi Yamada | Naoyoshi Kusaka | February 7, 2006 | February 26, 2005 |
| 10 | "Monocrawler's Communication Failure! Marco, Respond!"; Transliteration: "Monokurōrā tsūshin funō! Maruko ōtō seyo!" (Japanese: モノクローラー通信不能！ マルコ応答せよ！) | Kiyoshi Murayama | Kenichi Araki | Kiyoshi Murayama | February 14, 2006 | March 5, 2005 |
| 11 | "Showdown at the Mega-Gravity Planet!"; Transliteration: "Taiketsu! Chō jūryoku no hoshi!" (Japanese: 対決！ 超重力の星！) | Jun Takahashi | Kenichi Yamada | Hiro Masaki | February 21, 2006 | March 12, 2005 |
| 12 | "Where is Dark Phantom?!"; Transliteration: "Dāku fantomu wa doko da!?" (Japanese: ダークファントムはどこだ！？) | Naoyoshi Kusaka | Kenichi Yamada | Naoyoshi Kusaka | February 28, 2006 | March 19, 2005 |
| 13 | "The Greatest Crisis! Stand Up, Jet!"; Transliteration: "Saidai no kiki! Tachiagare Jetto!!" (Japanese: 最大の危機！ 立ち上がれジェット！！) | Naoyoshi Kusaka | Kenichi Yamada | Naoyoshi Kusaka | March 7, 2006 | March 26, 2005 |
| 14 | "Infiltrate the Terrifying Mutant Test Site!"; Transliteration: "Sen'nyū! Kyōfu no myūtanto jikkenjō!" (Japanese: 潜入！ 恐怖のミュータント実験場！) | Shin Katagai | Hiro Masaki | Shin Katagai | March 14, 2006 | April 2, 2005 |
| 15 | "Poacher's Trap! Save the Cook Bird!"; Transliteration: "Mitsuryōsha no wana! Kukku tori o sukue!" (Japanese: 密猟者のワナ！ クック鳥を救え！) | Shin Katagai | Kenichi Yamada | Kiyoshi Murayama | March 21, 2006 | April 9, 2005 |
| 16 | "Adventurous Gang Trip"; Transliteration: "Gyangu-darake no daibōken ryokō" (Japanese: ギャングだらけの大冒険旅行) | Naoyoshi Kusaka | Ryō Tamura | Naoyoshi Kusaka | March 28, 2006 | April 16, 2005 |
| 17 | "Chase the Fugitive Android!"; Transliteration: "Tōbō andoroido o oe!" (Japanese: 逃亡アンドロイドを追え！) | Naoyoshi Kusaka | Masahiko Shiraishi | Naoyoshi Kusaka | April 4, 2006 | April 23, 2005 |
| 18 | "Great Search! The Monster Planet Dulas!"; Transliteration: "Daisōsaku! Kaijū wakusei Dyurasu!" (Japanese: 大捜索！ 怪獣惑星デュラス！) | Yukio Okazaki | Kenichi Araki | Kiyoshi Murayama | April 11, 2006 | April 30, 2005 |
| 19 | "Stop the Bullet Express!"; Transliteration: "Dangan tokkyū o tomero!" (Japanese: 弾丸特急を止めろ！) | Naoyoshi Kusaka | Hiro Masaki | Naoyoshi Kusaka | April 18, 2006 | May 7, 2005 |
| 20 | "The Point of No Return"; Transliteration: "Kaerazaru toki" (Japanese: 帰らざる時) | Yukio Okazaki | Masahiko Shiraishi | Masahiko Ohta | April 25, 2006 | May 14, 2005 |
| 21 | "Discover Heron's Secret!"; Transliteration: "Heron no himitsu ni semare!" (Japanese: ヘロンの秘密にせまれ！) | Atsushi Ōtsuki | Jun Kamiya; Hiro Masaki | Akihiro Enomoto | May 9, 2006 | May 21, 2005 |
| 22 | "Criminal? Jet's Great Escape!"; Transliteration: "Han'nin? Jetto no dai dassō!" (Japanese: 犯人？ ジェットの大脱走！) | Jun Takahashi | Ryō Tamura | Jun Takahashi | May 16, 2006 | May 28, 2005 |
| 23 | "Hidden Treasure? The Mysterious Sitan Civilization!"; Transliteration: "Hihō? Maboroshi no shitan bunmei!" (Japanese: 秘宝？ 幻のシタン文明！) | Shin Katagai | Naoko Marukawa | Shin Katagai | May 23, 2006 | June 4, 2005 |
| 24 | "The Final Battle! Save Dark Phantom!"; Transliteration: "Saishū kessen! Dāku fantomu o sukue!" (Japanese: 最終決戦！ ダークファントムを救え！) | Naoyoshi Kusaka | Hiro Masaki | Naoyoshi Kusaka | May 30, 2006 | June 11, 2005 |
| 25 | "DICE Destroyed? Ambitions of the Elder Assembly"; Transliteration: "Daisu kaimetsu? Chōrōkai no yabō" (Japanese: ダイス壊滅？ 長老会の野望) | Naoyoshi Kusaka | Hiro Masaki | Naoyoshi Kusaka | June 6, 2006 | June 18, 2005 |
| 26 | "Fierce Battle! DICE vs. DICE!"; Transliteration: "Daigekisen! Daisu VS daisu!" (Japanese: 大激戦！ ダイスVSダイス！) | Naoyoshi Kusaka | Hiro Masaki | Naoyoshi Kusaka | June 13, 2006 | June 25, 2005 |
| 27 | "Enter the Heron Space! A New Adventure!"; Transliteration: "Totsunyū heron uchū! Arata na bōken!" (Japanese: 突入ヘロン宇宙！ 新たな冒険！) | Jun Kamiya | Hiro Masaki | Jun Kamiya | June 20, 2006 | September 10, 2005 |
| 28 | "Take Off! Dragon Fortress"; Transliteration: "Hasshin! Doragon fōtoresu" (Japanese: 発進！ ドラゴンフォートレス) | Naoyoshi Kusaka | Hiro Masaki | Naoyoshi Kusaka | June 27, 2006 | September 17, 2005 |
| 29 | "The Legend of the Sword"; Transliteration: "Ken no densetsu" (Japanese: 剣の伝説) | Naoyoshi Kusaka | Hiro Masaki | Naoyoshi Kusaka | July 4, 2006 | September 24, 2005 |
| 30 | "Gas Planet Duel!"; Transliteration: "Gasu wakusei no kettō!" (Japanese: ガス惑星の決闘！) | Kiyoshi Murayama | Mayu Sugiura | Kiyoshi Murayama | July 11, 2006 | October 1, 2005 |
| 31 | "The Kingdom of B-DICE"; Transliteration: "Baisu no ōkoku" (Japanese: バイスの王国) | Naoyoshi Kusaka | Kenichi Yamada | Naoyoshi Kusaka | July 18, 2006 | October 8, 2005 |
| 32 | "Jet vs. Dark Phantom!"; Transliteration: "Jetto tai Dāku Fantomu!" (Japanese: ジェット対ダークファントム！) | Atsushi Ōtsuki | Ryō Tamura | Hikaru Aogiri | July 25, 2006 | October 15, 2005 |
| 33 | "Motoraptor's Altobreak!"; Transliteration: "Motoraputā arutobureiku!" (Japanese: モトラプター アルトブレイク！) | Naoyoshi Kusaka | Ryō Tamura | Naoyoshi Kusaka | August 1, 2006 | October 22, 2005 |
| 34 | "Dark Sword! Jet's Do-or-Die Search"; Transliteration: "Dāku sōdo! Jetto kesshi no sōsaku" (Japanese: ダークソード！ ジェット決死の捜索) | Naoyoshi Kusaka | Masahiko Shiraishi | Naoyoshi Kusaka | August 8, 2006 | October 29, 2005 |
| 35 | "The Secret of Dinobreaker's Birth"; Transliteration: "Dinobureikā tanjō no himitsu" (Japanese: ディノブレイカー誕生の秘密) | Kiyoshi Murayama | Masahiko Shiraishi | Kiyoshi Murayama | August 15, 2006 | November 5, 2005 |
| 36 | "A Sad Sibling Showdown!"; Transliteration: "Kanashimi no kyōdai taiketsu!" (Japanese: 悲しみの兄弟対決！) | Naoyoshi Kusaka | Mayu Sugiura | Naoyoshi Kusaka | August 22, 2006 | November 12, 2005 |
| 37 | "A Village Named DICE"; Transliteration: "Daisu to iu na no mura" (Japanese: ダイスという名の村) | Naoyoshi Kusaka | Mayu Sugiura | Naoyoshi Kusaka | August 29, 2006 | November 19, 2005 |
| 38 | "All-Out Attack! The Great Battle For Planet Alek"; Transliteration: "Sōkōgeki! Wakusei Areku daikōbōsen" (Japanese: 総攻撃！ 惑星アレク大攻防戦) | Kiyoshi Murayama | Hiro Masaki | Masahiko Ohta | September 5, 2006 | November 26, 2005 |
| 39 | "The Final Battle! Farewell, Dark Phantom!"; Transliteration: "Saigo no tatakai! Saraba, dāku fantomu!" (Japanese: 最後の戦い！ さらば，ダークファントム！) | Naoyoshi Kusaka | Masahiko Shiraishi; Ryō Tamura | Naoyoshi Kusaka | September 12, 2006 | December 3, 2005 |
| 40 | "The Future of DICE"; Transliteration: "Mirai no daisu-tachi" (Japanese: 未来のダイスたち) | Jun Kamiya | Kenichi Yamada | Jun Kamiya | September 19, 2006 | December 10, 2005 |

== Video game ==
A video game based on this series was released for the PlayStation 2 on September 20, 2005.
