= Flame of Recca =

Japanese manga series

- First tankōbon volume cover, featuring Recca Hanabishi (front) and Yanagi Sakoshita (back)

烈火の炎 (Rekka no Honō)
- Genre: Adventure; Martial arts; Supernatural
- Manga
- Written by: Nobuyuki Anzai
- Published by: Shogakukan
- English publisher: NA: Viz Media
- Imprint: Shōnen Sunday Comics
- Magazine: Weekly Shōnen Sunday
- Original run: March 22, 1995 – January 30, 2002
- Volumes: 33
- Anime television series
- Directed by: Noriyuki Abe
- Produced by: Ken Hagino; Madoka Takiyama
- Written by: Hiroshi Hashimoto
- Music by: Yusuke Honma
- Studio: Studio Pierrot
- Licensed by: NA: Viz Media (former); Discotek Media
- Original network: FNS (Fuji TV)
- English network: SEA: AXN, Animax Asia
- Original run: July 19, 1997 – July 10, 1998
- Episodes: 42
- Video game

Flame of Recca: The Game
- Developer: Konami
- Publisher: Konami
- Genre: Fighting
- Platform: Game Boy Advance
- Released: December 20, 2001
- Video game

Flame of Recca: Final Burning
- Developer: Konami
- Publisher: Konami
- Genre: Action, fighting
- Platform: PlayStation 2
- Released: June 10, 2004
- icon

Flame of Recca (Japanese: 烈火の炎, Hepburn: Rekka no Honō) is a Japanese manga series written and illustrated by Nobuyuki Anzai. It was serialized in Shogakukan's shōnen manga magazine Weekly Shōnen Sunday from March 1995 to January 2002, with its chapters collected in 33 tankōbon volumes. The series follows Recca Hanabishi, a teenage ninja with the ability to manipulate fire who is a descendant of the Hokage clan, which was wiped out centuries ago.

A 42-episode anime television series adaptation by Studio Pierrot was broadcast on Fuji TV from July 1997 to July 1998. The series has also spawned two video games. Both the anime and manga were licensed for North American distribution in English by Viz Media. The anime was later picked up by Discotek Media, which released it on DVD in 2015 and Blu-ray in 2025.

The Flame of Recca manga has had over 25 million copies in circulation.

== Plot ==
Recca Hanabishi is a teenage boy who is interested in ninja and claims to be one himself. He often gets into fights because he made it publicly known that the person who manages to defeat him will earn his services as a loyal ninja. Despite this, he eventually pledges his loyalty and services as a ninja to Yanagi Sakoshita, a girl with the innate ability to heal any wound/injury, because of her kindness and compassion. Recca soon discovers that he possesses the innate ability to control/manipulate flames, and eventually learns that he is actually the son of the sixth generation leader of the Hokage, a ninja clan that was wiped out in 1576, roughly 400 years before the series's present day.

The Hokage ninjas wielded mystical objects called madōgu (魔導具). Madōgu grant their users special abilities, such as allowing their users to manipulate certain elements (as in the case of the Fūjin, which allows its wielder to manipulate the element of wind) and enhancing their user's strength/skills (as in the case of the Dosei no Wa, which increases its user's physical strength and the Idaten, which increases its user's running speed). Oda Nobunaga had invaded the Hokage in 1576 for the purpose of acquiring these weapons, and the series's main antagonist, Kōran Mori, is searching for a madōgu that will grant him eternal life. Recca and his friends become entangled in Mori's quest for eternal life as he attempts to kidnap Yanagi, believing that her healing powers will help him achieve immortality. This leads them to join the Ura Butō Satsujin, a tournament wherein the warriors that wield madōgu gather to battle each other. After winning the tournament, Recca and his teammates discover that Mori was on his way to acquire the Tendō Jigoku (天堂地獄; lit. 'Heaven and Hell'), a madōgu said to grant its user eternal life, and once again attempt to stop him.

== Production ==
Prior to its publication, the editor-in-chief of Weekly Shōnen Sunday had suggested different titles including Recca 100°C (烈火100°C) and Kattobi Recca (かっとび烈火, Kattobi Rekka). During development, creator Nobuyuki Anzai initially wrote the series's title using the archaic kanji character "焔". However, prior to publication, this was revised to the modern variant "炎". Anzai's editor remarked that the original kanji suggested a historical drama style, which the author confirmed would be incorporated into the story.

== Media ==
=== Manga ===
Written and illustrated by Nobuyuki Anzai, Flame of Recca was serialized in Shogakukan's shōnen manga magazine Weekly Shōnen Sunday from March 22, 1995, (Note: It started in the magazine's 16th issue of 1995 (cover dated April 5), released on March 22 of that same year.) to January 30, 2002. Its 329 chapters were collected in 33 tankōbon volumes by Shogakukan, released from September 18, 1995, to April 18, 2002. Shogakukan also released the manga in 17 wideban volumes from January 18, 2006, to March 16, 2007, and a bunkoban edition from July 15, 2010, to October 15, 2011.

The manga was licensed for North American distribution in English by Viz Media and United Kingdom distribution in English by Gollancz Manga. Viz released all 33 volumes from July 30, 2003, to November 10, 2009, while Gollancz released ten volumes between March 6 and November 28, 2006.

=== Anime ===
Flame of Recca was adapted into a 42-episode anime television series, produced by Studio Pierrot and directed by Noriyuki Abe, with series composition handled by Hiroshi Hashimoto. It was broadcast from July 19, 1997, to July 10, 1998, on Fuji TV. Pony Canyon has released the entire series on DVD and laserdisc, while Geneon released it in two DVD boxsets on April 22 and June 24, 2005.

Flame of Recca aired in Southeast Asia on AXN and Animax Asia. In North America, the series was licensed for an English release by Viz Media, which released it in ten DVD sets between October 26, 2004, and January 9, 2007. Discotek Media re-licensed the series in 2014 and released it on DVD on February 24, 2015. Discotek Media released the series on Blu-ray on May 27, 2025.

==== Soundtrack ====
The Flame of Recca anime series featured background music composed by Yusuke Honma. The series's opening theme song is "Nanka Shiawase" (なんか幸せ; lit. 'I Feel Kind of Happy'), performed by The Oystars. The first ending theme song is "Love is Changing" (episodes 1–32), performed by Hikaru Nishida, while the second ending theme song is "Zutto Kimi no Soba de" (ずっと君の傍で; lit. 'Always by Your Side'), performed by Yuki Masuda (episodes 33–42). All songs were released in singles, and all except "Zutto Kimi no Soba de" were included in the original soundtracks. Flame of Recca Original Soundtrack Vol. 1 was released by Pony Canyon on December 6, 1997, and features background music used in the series, as well as the series's opening song and first closing song. Flame of Recca Original Soundtrack Vol. 2 was released by Pony Canyon on May 4, 1998. It includes more background music used in the series along with a special CD drama entitled Rekka no Honō Special CD Drama: Daitōron Kai Tsuyoi No Wa Dareda?! (｢烈火の炎｣ スペシャルCDドラマ: 火影大討論会 強いのは誰だ?!; lit. 'Flame of Recca Special CD Drama: The Great Debate, 'Who is the Strongest?!'').

=== Video games ===
A fighting game, titled Flame of Recca: The Game (烈火の炎 -THE GAME-, Rekka no Honō za Gēmu), was released by Konami on December 20, 2001, for the Game Boy Advance.

An action/fighting game, titled Flame of Recca: Final Burning (烈火の炎 -FINAL BURNING-, Rekka no Honō Fainaru Bāningu), was released by Konami on June 10, 2004, for the PlayStation 2. A limited number of soundtrack CDs and sets of four bookmarks with character illustrations by manga author Nobuyuki Anzai were included with the game CD.

The series's protagonist has also appeareded in the 2009 Konami fighting game Sunday vs Magazine: Shūketsu! Chōjō Daikessen for the PlayStation Portable.

== Reception ==
The Flame of Recca manga has had over 25 million copies in circulation.

Jason Thompson, author of Manga: The Complete Guide, described the Flame of Recca manga as "polished and quick-paced", and that it "reads like a more carefully plotted, more extreme version of Yu Yu Hakusho." Patricia Duffield, a columnist for Animerica Extra, felt the story and artwork continuously evolved with characters and their unique weapons. "Although the series seems to have a tendency toward male fan service, Flame of Recca can be as enjoyable for gals as it is for guys." Duffield concluded, "If lots of ninja action with supernatural flair interests you, give Flame of Recca a try."

In 2010, Mania.com's Briana Lawrence listed Flame of Recca at number four of the website's "10 Anime Series That Need a Reboot".
