= Gregory Horror Show (disambiguation) =

Gregory Horror Show is a Japanese TV series.

Gregory Horror Show may also refer to other works based on the TV series:

- Gregory Horror Show (board game)
- Gregory Horror Show (manga)
- Gregory Horror Show (video game)
