= Ippatsu Kiki Musume =

Japanese manga and anime series

- First tankōbon volume cover

イッパツ危機娘
- Genre: Gag comedy
- Manga
- Written by: Shigemitsu Harada
- Published by: Kodansha
- Imprint: Young Magazine KC Special
- Magazine: Weekly Young Magazine
- Original run: January 19, 1998 – February 7, 2000
- Volumes: 6
- Anime television series
- Directed by: Hiroyoshi Yoshida
- Produced by: Tetsuo Gensho; Yoshiyuki Ochiai
- Written by: Shinichiro Minami
- Studio: Group TAC
- Original network: TBS
- Original run: October 5, 1999 – October 29, 1999
- Episodes: 16

Ippatsu Kiki Musume (Japanese: イッパツ危機娘; lit. "Sudden Danger Girl"), also known as Miss Critical Moment, is a Japanese manga series written and illustrated by Shigemitsu Harada. It was serialized in Kodansha's seinen manga magazine Weekly Young Magazine from January 1998 to February 2000, and was collected into six tankōbon volumes, released from July 1998 to March 2000. The manga follows a woman named Kunyan and her many comedic misfortunes.

It was adapted into an anime series by Group TAC, originally broadcast on TBS in October 1999.

== Plot ==
Kunyan is a 20 year old international student from China, who is smart, pretty, and athletic. However, due to her bad drinking habits (which are never mentioned or shown in the anime), she constantly finds herself in many crisis situations in her daily life.

== Characters ==
Kunyan (クーニャン, Kūnyan)
Voiced by: Kumiko Watanabe
Linda (リンダ, Rinda)
Voiced by: Yoko Asada
Nadja (ナジャ, Naja)
Voiced by: Yuriko Yamaguchi
Narrator (ナレーター, Narētā)
Voiced by: Tesshō Genda

== Media ==
=== Manga ===
Ippatsu Kiki Musume is written and illustrated by Shigemitsu Harada. It was serialized in Weekly Young Magazine from January 1998 to February 2000, with its 81 chapters collected into six tankōbon volumes, released from July 1998 to March 2000.

==== Volume list ====
No.	Japanese release date	Japanese ISBN
1	July 3, 1998	978-4-06-336748-5
2	January 5, 1999	978-4-06-336778-2
3	May 1, 1999	978-4-06-336801-7
4	August 4, 1999	978-4-06-336821-5
5	December 3, 1999	978-4-06-336842-0
6	March 3, 2000	978-4-06-336856-7

=== Anime ===
A 16-episode anime series adapted by Group TAC aired on TBS from October 5 to October 29, 1999, on the TV variety show, Wonderful. Each episode had a runtime of 3 minutes.

==== Episode list ====
No.	Title	Original release date
1	"Annoying Sauna"; Transliteration: "Abikyōkan Sauna" (Japanese: 阿鼻叫喚サウナ)	October 5, 1999
Kunyan manages to dislocate every joint in her body after falling asleep in the locked local sauna. She must find a way to open the door before she dies of dehydration.
2	"Bloodshed of Shelled Face"; Transliteration: "Ganmen Kōkaku no Ryūketsu" (Japanese: 顔面甲殻の流血)	October 6, 1999
Kunyan gets an Alaskan snow crab attached to her face, and unfortunately for her, it intends to stay that way.
3	"Killer Exercise"; Transliteration: "Satsujin Ekusasaizu" (Japanese: 殺人エクササイズ)	October 7, 1999
Kunyan finds herself at the mercy of Muscle Boy Tom, an exercise robot.
4	"Escape From the Crazy Alcohol"; Transliteration: "Kyōsō Arukōru Dasshutsu" (Japanese: 狂走アルコール脱出)	October 8, 1999
Kunyan must put out a rum fire while stuck in a yoga position.
5	"Sinking! American Joke!"; Transliteration: "Gekichin! Amerikan Jooku!" (Japanese: 撃沈!アメリカンジョーク!)	October 11, 1999
Kunyan and her friend Linda find themselves trapped in a steel drum during a rain storm, and if they can't figure a way out, they'll drown.
6	"Duel with the Snake"; Transliteration: "Gekitou! Amimenishiki Hebi" (Japanese: 激闘!アミメニシキヘビ)	October 12, 1999
Kunyan has to figure out how to stop her boyfriend's pet python from swallowing her.
7	"The Battle Inside the Locked Room"; Transliteration: "Koshitsu Muen no Arasoi" (Japanese: 個室無縁の戦い)	October 13, 1999
Kunyan manages to lock herself in the bathroom only hours before she's supposed to leave for a free trip to Australia.
8	"Barrel Baths"; Transliteration: "Doramukan Furo" (Japanese: ドラム缶風呂)	October 14, 1999
Kunyan and her friends spend a relaxing day cooling off in water-filled steel drums...until a brush fire heats things up.
9	"Building Closest to Hell"; Transliteration: "Meido ni Ichiban Chikai Biru" (Japanese: 冥土に一番近いビル)	October 18, 1999
Kunyan finds herself suspended between two buildings with no easy way to get down again.
10	"Burning Hell"; Transliteration: "Tatakau Raundo Gaaru" (Japanese: 闘うラウンドガール)	October 19, 1999
Kunyan takes a job as a ring girl at a sumo match while desperately trying to relieve herself between rounds.
11	"I'm a Tragic Aquatic Flower"; Transliteration: "Watashi wa Hosanna Suichuuka" (Japanese: 私は悲惨な水中花)	October 20, 1999
After a night of drunken revels with her friends, Kunyan needs to free her hair (and herself) from the bathtub drain before she drowns.
12	"Bloody Emergency Call"; Transliteration: "Chimidoro Kyūkyū Kōru" (Japanese: 血みどろ救急コール)	October 21, 1999
Kunyan needs to call Emergency because she's bleeding to death. Unfortunately the room she's in is littered with broken glass.
13	"We're Gonna Fall!! - Uneasy Tandem Touring"; Transliteration: "Shousou no Tandemu Tsuuringu" (Japanese: 焦燥のタンデムツーリング)	October 26, 1999
Kunyan and Linda need to figure out how to survive their motorcycle being stuck on a cliff.
14	"Pressure! Enormous Dresser!"; Transliteration: "Appaku! Kyoudaina Tansu" (Japanese: 圧迫!巨大タンス!)	October 27, 1999
Kunyan tries to keep an enormous dresser drawer from falling over.
15	"The Girl Testing Her Limits in the Scorching Hot Phone Booth"; Transliteration: "Shakunetsu no Hakoiri Kyougen Musume" (Japanese: 灼熱の箱入り極限娘)	October 28, 1999
An inconsiderate driver traps Kunyan in a phone booth at high noon.
16	"Deathmatch in the Electric Current Bath"; Transliteration: "Desumatchi in Denryuu Furo" (Japanese: デスマッチin電流風呂)	October 29, 1999
Kunyan's cat endangers her life by retrieving her powered-on hair dryer while she's in the bathtub.

== See also ==
- Cells at Work! Code Black, another manga series written by Shigemitsu Harada
- Megami no Sprinter, another manga series written by Shigemitsu Harada
- Motoyome, another manga series written by Shigemitsu Harada
- Witches Are In Their Prime In Their Three-Hundreds, another manga series written by Shigemitsu Harada
- Yuria 100 Shiki, another manga series by Shigemitsu Harada
