= Yōko Asada =

Japanese voice actress

- 浅田 葉子
- Born: 23 May 1969 (age 57); Hyōgo Prefecture, Japan
- Occupation: Voice actress
- Years active: 1992–present
- Agent: 81 Produce

Yōko Asada (浅田 葉子, Asada Yōko; born May 23, 1969) is a Japanese voice actress from Hyōgo Prefecture. She is affiliated with the talent management firm 81 Produce.

== Filmography ==
=== TV series ===
- Wedding Peach (1995), Girl (ep 12)
- You're Under Arrest (1996), Hiromi Shinohara (ep 9)
- Detective Conan (1996), Ishiguro (ep 217)
- Ganbarist! Shun (1996), female student (ep 2)
- Pocket Monsters (1997), Botan
- Kyuumei Senshi Nanosaver (1997), Kei
- Weiß Kreuz (1998), Midori Hazuki (Ep. 20)
- Serial Experiments Lain (1998), Alice Mizuki
- His and Her Circumstances (1998), Music teacher (ep 14)
- D4 Princess (1999), Aino Nozomi
- Gregory Horror Show (1999), Roulette Boy
- Ippatsu Kiki Musume (1999), Linda
- Digimon Tamers (2001), D-Reaper, Juri Kato
- Kokoro Library (2001), Raika Mizumoto (ep 10)
- Digimon Frontier (2002), Plotmon
- Kyo Kara Maoh! (2004), Roseno
- Aria the Animation (2005), Akiko Hoshino (ep 12–13)
- Koi suru Tenshi Angelique: Kokoro no Mezameru Toki (2006), Queen of Seijuu
- Koi suru Tenshi Angelique: Kagayaki no, hita (2007), Queen/Angelique Collet

==== Original video animation (OVA) ====
- Golden Boy (1995), Ayuko (young)
- Cool Devices (1995), Cat Girl (Operation 3), Marino Ohkura (Operation 6), Minako (Operation 10)
- My Dear Marie (1996), Mari
- Ninja Cadets (1996), Inaba
- Parade Parade (1996), Kaori Shiine, theme song performance
- Alice in Cyberland (1997), Alice
- Tournament of the Gods: Title Match (1997), Plumerock (ep 2), Receptionist (ep 1)
- Pendant (1997)
- Wild Cardz (1998), Casa Clover
- Dragon Knight: The Wheel of Time (1998), Natasha, theme song performance
- Mystery of the Necronomicon (1999), Asuka Kashiwagi
- Dokyusei 2 Special: Sotsugyousei (1999), Sakurako Sugimoto
- Angelique: Shiroi Tsubasa no Memoir (2000), Angelique Collet
- éX-Driver (2000), Lorna Endou
- Angelique: Seichi Yori Ai o Komete (2001), Angelique Collet

==== Film ====
- éX-Driver the Movie (2002), Lorna Endou
- Digimon Tamers: Runaway Locomon (2002), Juri Katou

=== Video games ===
- Arc the Lad II (1996), Leeza
- Lunar: Silver Star Story (1996), Mia Ausa
- Ehrgeiz (1998), Tifa Lockhart (Arcade Version)
- Princess Quest (1998), Will
- Samurai Shodown: Warriors Rage (1999), Rinka Yoshino
- Unison: Rebels of Rhythm & Dance (2000), Cela
- Gregory Horror Show: Soul Collector (2003), Roulette Boy

==== Drama CD ====
- Digimon Tamers Original Story: Message in the Packet (2003), Juri Katou
- Digimon Tamers 2018: Days -Information and the Unordinary- (2018), Juri Katou
