= List of Cells at Work! episodes =

Cells at Work! is an anime television series featuring the anthropomorphized cells of a human body, with the two main protagonists being a red blood cell and a white blood cell she frequently encounters. It is directed by Kenichi Suzuki and animated by David Production, with scripts written by Suzuki and Yūko Kakihara, and character designs by Takahiko Yoshida. The series' music is composed by Kenichiro Suehiro and Mayuko. The anime series premiered on July 8, 2018, on Tokyo MX and other channels.

It ran for two seasons broadcast from July 2018 to February 2021, totaling 21 episodes.

== Season 1 ==
| No. | Title | Directed by | Written by | Original release date |
|---|---|---|---|---|
| 1 | "Pneumococcus"; Transliteration: "Haienkyūkin" (Japanese: 肺炎球菌) | Ken'ichi Suzuki | Yūko Kakihara | July 8, 2018 |
Inside a human body, a red blood cell, named AE3803, is rescued from a sudden attack from a group of Pneumococcus bacteria by a white blood cell, named U-1146. Later, as AE3803 tries to find her way to the lungs to make the delivery, she discovers one of the bacteria has escaped and is planning an attack on the lungs, so she and U-1146 accompany each other to the lungs to pursue it. Upon reaching the lungs and parting ways with U-1146, AE3803 discovers Pneumococcus had been hiding in her package the entire time, waiting to target red blood cells for their nutrients. However, U-1146, who had caught onto the bacterium's plan, arrives in time and lures the bacterium into a trap, where he is ultimately sneezed out of the lungs.
| 2 | "Scrape Wound"; Transliteration: "Surikizu" (Japanese: すり傷) | Shigatsu Yoshikawa | Yūko Kakihara | July 15, 2018 |
The red blood cells find themselves in trouble when the vessel they are traveling on is broken by a skin abrasion, with U-1146 and the other white blood cells forced to deal with all the germs that come through as a result. As the bacteria plot to eliminate all the neutrophils before backup can arrive, the white blood cells manage to defeat them while the platelets arrive to clot the wound, preventing more germs from getting inside. Afterwards, the platelets round up several blood cells and force them to be part of the clot, much to their chagrin.
| 3 | "Influenza"; Transliteration: "Infuruenza" (Japanese: インフルエンザ) | Yukihiko Asaki | Yūko Kakihara | July 22, 2018 |
Naive T Cell is patrolling the body for influenza virus proliferation. But since he's never taken on the enemy before, he's completely terrified and useless. He finally ends up fleeing the battlefield, where the veteran Killer T Cells, Neutrophils and Macrophages are battling. Naive T Cell is filled with self-loathing until Dendritic Cell sees him and speaks to him kindly. This encouragement transforms him into Effector T Cell, a much braver and stronger form that joins the other immune cells in wiping out the influenza virus. However, a surviving virus mutates into Type A and proliferates again, so the fighting goes on.
| 4 | "Food Poisoning"; Transliteration: "Shokuchūdoku" (Japanese: 食中毒) | Satoru Kiyomaru | Yūko Kakihara | July 29, 2018 |
A band of Vibrio bacteria invades the stomach. Basophil warns the immune cells about it, but confuses everyone by speaking cryptically. The immune cells defeat the invaders, but one of them, Eosinophil, was unable to land any good hits and had to be rescued. The other cells mock her as a weakling, except AE3803 and U-1146. The stomach then gets invaded by a massive Anisakis parasite. The immune cells are no match for it, but Eosinophil explains she is designed to battle parasites and kills it with a single stab. The other cells apologize for making fun of her and praise her as a heroine.
| 5 | "Cedar Pollen Allergy"; Transliteration: "Sugi Kafun Arerugī" (Japanese: スギ花粉アレルギー) | Satoshi Ōsedo | Yūko Kakihara | August 5, 2018 |
The body inhales cedar pollen, which unleashes gigantic allergens. Though U-1146 points out the creatures are mindless and non-malicious, Memory Cell claims they bring impending doom. B Cell easily defeats the allergens, but Mast Cell releases a profuse amount of histamines within the body, which causes violent allergic reactions that damage the surroundings. Just as everyone blames Mast Cell for the destruction, the body takes a steroid to treat the allergy. The steroid appears in the form of a robot that indiscriminately destroys its surroundings until it loses power. The survivors realize all of this was caused by following Memory Cell's claims and trying to attack the allergens.
| 6 | "Erythroblasts and Myelocytes"; Transliteration: "Sekigakyū to Kotsuzuikyū" (Japanese: 赤芽球と骨髄球) | Souta Ueno | Yūko Kakihara | August 12, 2018 |
AE3803 gets lost again and finds herself in her birthplace, the Red Bone Marrow. She reminisces on being a young Erythroblast being trained by a Macrophage on how to be a Red Blood Cell. One day, while practicing to evacuate from bacteria, she got lost and was separated from the others. She got captured by a Pseudomonas bacterium who intended to torture and kill her before moving on to other blood cells. A young Myelocyte came to her rescue, and although no match for the bacterium, bought enough time for Macrophage and a Neutrophil to arrive and kill the bacterium. She thanked the Myelocyte for helping her and they went their separate ways hoping to someday see each other again. In the present, she runs into U-1146. As he offers to guide her to her destination, she suspects the Myelocyte who saved her grew up to be U-1146. Later, U-1146 saves a Normal Cell from a Cancer Cell. The Normal Cell explains there are more Cancer Cells in his apartment complex. The Normal Cell leads U-1146, Killer T Cell, and NK Cell to his apartment, but Killer T Cell continually trades spats with NK Cell and stubbornly refuses to work with her. The group splits up and once they are alone, NK Cell reveals she knew the Normal Cell was actually a Cancer Cell in disguise.
| 7 | "Cancer Cells"; Transliteration: "Gan Saibō" (Japanese: がん細胞) | Shigatsu Yoshikawa | Ken'ichi Suzuki | August 19, 2018 |
NK Cell battles the Cancer Cell, who is able to shapeshift and spread into the surrounding environment. Meanwhile, U-1146 and Killer T Cell run into Cancer Cell's multiplying clones. The Cancer Cells order massive quantities of nutrients to be delivered to the apartment to greedily sustain themselves, but AE3803 feels suspicious and alerts the rest of the immune system. The original Cancer Cell wants to destroy the body for designating him to die as soon as he was born. U-1146, Killer T Cell and NK Cell are cornered and about to be killed, until the other immune cells arrive. All the Cancer Cells are wiped out, with NK Cell delivering the final blow against the original one, but he vows revenge before dying in front of U-1146.
| 8 | "Blood Circulation"; Transliteration: "Ketsueki Junkan" (Japanese: 血液循環) | Sumito Sasaki | Yūko Kakihara | August 26, 2018 |
AE3803 becomes tired of always getting lost and resolves to circulate the body without guidance. After a difficult journey, she manages to travel through the heart, then the lungs to exchange carbon dioxide with oxygen, then to the body's cells to exchange oxygen with carbon dioxide. U-1146 clandestinely followed her and helped return her dropped notes and hat, then killed some germs who tried to ambush her, all without her noticing his presence. U-1146 later tells Killer T Cell that he has gained an appreciation for all the hard work the Red Blood Cells do every day and hopes the immune cells can live in harmony with other cells, but Killer T Cell angrily punches him and orders him to get back to work. AE3803 meets U-1146 and tells him how her day went. Killer T Cell walks around seeing several immune cells mingling with other cells and irritably denies being envious.
| 9 | "Thymocytes"; Transliteration: "Kyōsen Saibō" (Japanese: 胸腺細胞) | Hitomi Ezoe | Yūko Kakihara | September 2, 2018 |
As Killer T Cell and Helper T Cell get into an argument about the former's harsh training methods, Dendritic Cell shares his photo album with the Naive T Cells and explains the two's shared past. While training in the Thymus, the young Helper T Cell and Regulatory T Cell easily passed all the hand to hand combat and obstacle courses, but the young Killer T Cell struggled. The young Helper T Cell was disdainful of him for this, but eventually gave him advice that helped him pass the final test. Killer T Cell vowed to become a worthy defender of the body, while Helper T Cell decided to become a commander. In the present, Killer T Cell and Helper T Cell notice the photo album. Severely embarrassed, they both try unsuccessfully to take it from Dendritic Cell in order to burn it. Regulatory T Cell muses that they are both still morons as they were in training.
| 10 | "Staphylococcus aureus" Transliteration: "Ōshoku Budō Kyūkin" (Japanese: 黄色ブドウ球菌) | Hironori Aoyagi & Yasufumi Soejima | Yūko Kakihara | September 9, 2018 |
AE3803 is rescued from a germ by a mysterious immune cell called Monocyte, who doesn't speak and wears a hazmat suit. Later, the nasal cavity gets invaded by a band of Staphylococcus aureus. Vowing revenge for one of their number who was killed in "Scrape Wound", they combine their bodies into a powerful giant who is able to trap the white blood cells in a net of fibrin. A squad of Monocytes appears and sheds their hazmat suits to reveal that they are Macrophages; Monocytes being one of the many roles they play. The Macrophages easily defeat the invaders. As the white blood cells thank the Macrophages for saving everyone, AE3803 asks one of them how they fit their enormous dresses inside the hazmat suits, but she tells her it is a secret.
| 11 | "Heat Stress"; Transliteration: "Netchūshō" (Japanese: 熱中症) | Tarō Kubo | Yūko Kakihara | September 16, 2018 |
The body suffers from heat stroke, leading to a heat wave inside and the supply of fluids being depleted. To make matters worse, a Bacillus cereus bacterium, who is not bothered by the heat, invades the body. While the other cells struggle to cope with the extreme heat, U-1146 pursues the bacterium, but grows fatigued. Just when it seems that all is lost, the body gets an injection of fluids, reviving everyone and allowing U-1146 to kill the bacterium.
| 11.5 (ONA) | "Heat Stress: If There Was Pocari Sweat"; Transliteration: "Netchūshō: Moshimo Pokari Suetto ga Attara" (Japanese: 熱中症～もしもポカリスエットがあったら～) | N/A | N/A | July 8, 2019 |
A commercial version of episode 11 in which the threat of heat stroke is averted thanks to the arrival of Pocari Sweat sports drink.
| 12 | "Hemorrhagic Shock"; Transliteration: "Shukketsusei Shokku" (Japanese: 出血性ショック) | Satoshi Ōsedo | Yūko Kakihara | September 23, 2018 |
| 13 | "Hemorrhagic Shock"; Transliteration: "Shukketsusei Shokku" (Japanese: 出血性ショック) | Ken'ichi Suzuki, Shigatsu Yoshikawa & Souta Ueno | Ken'ichi Suzuki | September 30, 2018 |
Part 1: AE3803 is assigned to be a mentor to a new red blood cell named NT4201, but finds herself out of her depth. AE3803 is embarrassed when she gets them lost several times and finds that NT4201 seems to already know about the body, and that she prefers to do her job as efficiently as possible and not associate with non red blood cells. The body suffers a head injury which results in massive blood loss. NT4201 starts to panic due to the change in her perfect schedule, but AE3803 manages to get her back on track. As the body temperature begins to drop, U-1146 defeats germs that entered through the injury, then is horrified to realize the number of red blood cells have depleted. Part 2: The platelets struggle to seal the head wound, but increased blood pressure causes even more blood cells to be lost. With so few red blood cells, there are not enough to deliver oxygen to all the cells, and they start to die. The body temperature drops drastically, leading to a blizzard inside. NT4201 falls into despair, and rants that their actions are pointless and the body will die, but AE3803 refuses to give up. The body receives a blood transfusion. The new red blood cells, though confused by their new surroundings, agree to help deliver oxygen, saving the body. As the body's structures are rebuilt, NT4201 apologizes for looking down on AE3803. AE3803 and everybody else gets back to their normal routine.
| Special | "The Common Cold"; Transliteration: "Kaze Shōkōgun" (Japanese: 風邪症候群) | Yūki Morita | Akira Horiuchi | December 27, 2018 |
A Normal Cell who is bored of his monotonous duties and annoyed by his rowdy Killer T Cell neighbors is befriended by a mysterious cell who doesn't speak and wears a strange hat. The two have fun pulling pranks on various cells. Eventually, the stranger reveals himself to be a cell infected by a virus, with his hat being the replicating virus. He attempts to infect the Normal Cell, but the immune cells arrive in time to wipe out the virus. After identifying the virus as Rhinovirus (The Common Cold), the immune cells lecture the Normal Cell to study so that he can identify pathogens in the future. Now appreciative of his neighbors, the Normal Cell invites the immune cells to a game of badminton.

== Season 2 ==
| No. overall | No. in season | Title | Directed by | Written by | Original release date (Note: Episodes were released every Friday at 2:00 a.m. JST on Funimation.) |
|---|---|---|---|---|---|
| 14 | 1 | "Bump"; Transliteration: "Tankobu" (Japanese: たんこぶ) | Hirofumi Ogura | Yūko Kakihara | January 9, 2021 |
While chasing a germ that thinks its cuteness will protect it, U-1146 meets Backward-Cap, a novice platelet who aims to become stronger. A sudden incident in the temple's area causes a breaking of capillaries, and the platelets must stop the internal hemorrhage, with some coaxing from Megakaryocyte (cell that produces platelets). Megakaryocyte at first berates them for being weak, then motivates them by offering medals. The platelets form human chains to reach across the injury and seal it with a clot.
| 15 | 2 | "Acquired Immunity"; Transliteration: "Kakutoku Men'eki" (Japanese: 獲得免疫) | Daisuke Chiba | Yūko Kakihara | January 16, 2021 |
| 15 | 2 | "Peyer's Patch"; Transliteration: "Paieru-ban" (Japanese: パイエル板) | Daisuke Chiba | Yūko Kakihara | January 16, 2021 |
"Acquired Immunity": Memory Cell receives visions of destruction and believes he has gained the power to see the future. The Parotid gland gets invaded by the Mumps virus. As the immune cells fight them, B Cell cannot create antibodies without Memory Cell's information, but Memory Cell is obsessed with trying to see the future again and is useless. When B Cell strikes him in frustration, he realizes he was actually seeing his memories of the past when the body received a Mumps vaccine. B Cell creates antibodies from the information and wipes out the virus. Afterwards, B Cell explains why it took him so long, resulting in the cells beating Memory Cell up. "Peyer's Patch": U-1146 takes AE3083 and NT4201 on a tour of the small intestine, but Killer T Cell berates him for not focusing on his job. The small intestine gets invaded by Campylobacter bacteria who take an Intestinal Epithelial Cell hostage. The white blood cells surrender and give in to the bacteria's demands to humiliate themselves. However, they were slowly luring the bacteria to a Peyer's patch where the bacteria are ambushed and destroyed. Afterwards, Killer T Cell apologizes to U-1146, but retracts his apology when U-1146 realizes he forgot about AE3083 and NT4201 and rushes over to check on them.
| 16 | 3 | "Dengue Fever"; Transliteration: "Dengu Netsu" (Japanese: デング熱) | Souta Ueno | Yūko Kakihara | January 23, 2021 |
| 16 | 3 | "Acne"; Transliteration: "Nikibi" (Japanese: ニキビ) | Souta Ueno | Yūko Kakihara | January 23, 2021 |
"Dengue Fever": The cells complain to Mast Cell when she releases excess histamines for a minor problem and causes inflammation, making her angry and vow not to do her job. The body gets bitten by a mosquito that sucks out several blood cells, then infects the body with the Dengue virus. The virus takes over Langerhans cells and they attack the body. Despite seeing the damage, Mast Cell refuses to release histamines until Basophil tells her to do what she thinks is right. The histamines distract the infected cells and alert the immune cells so they can wipe out the virus. The cells apologize to Mast Cell, but she gloats that she was right all along and did not do anything wrong with her previous histamine releases. "Acne": U-1146 investigates a pore that turned into a pimple and finds acne bacteria have enslaved the hair and sebum producing cells to keep them fed on sebum. The bacteria had also killed several Neutrophils and turned them into pus. A young hair cell almost gives in to despair and says they are only one hair and unimportant, but U-1146 tells him every individual is important. U-1146 fights the bacteria, but their king can regenerate indefinitely due to the sebum he consumes. Drawing on U-1146's words, the child encourages his brethren that they can help by producing an overload of sebum. The king gets so engorged that he can barely move, allowing U-1146 to kill him. U-1146 nearly drowns in the sebum, but survives.
| 17 | 4 | "H. Pylori"; Transliteration: "Pirorikin" (Japanese: ピロリ菌) | Hironori Aoyagi | Yūko Kakihara | January 30, 2021 |
| 17 | 4 | "Antigenic Shift"; Transliteration: "Kōgen Hen'i" (Japanese: 抗原変異) | Hironori Aoyagi | Yūko Kakihara | January 30, 2021 |
"H. Pylori": Normal Cell, who dreams of saving someone like the immune cells do, finds four cute and tiny bacteria and keeps them as pets. AE3083 delivers oxygen to him while U-1146 detects the bacteria and confiscates them for future disposal just as he is called to the stomach. Normal Cell follows him, worried about the bacteria. The stomach is being attacked by H. Pylori. When Normal Cell saves the bacteria from falling debris, one of them beats up the H. Pylori, allowing U-1146 to kill it. U-1146 realizes that they are Lactic acid bacteria, benevolent to the body. The one that fought stays in the stomach while the others stay with Normal Cell. U-1146 thanks Normal Cell and invites him to join him on patrol. "Antigenic Shift": U-1146 and Normal Cell go to the small intestine, which is overloaded with Purine, but one of the lactic acid bacteria consumes it before deciding to stay there. Later, Normal Cell accidentally drops one of the remaining two into a storm drain. U-1146 sadly remarks that he has no authority over the immune response so he can't tell the other immune cells not to attack that bacterium if they mistake it for hostile, reducing Normal Cell to tears as he insults the immune cells for being heartless. Just then, NK Cell arrives.
| 18 | 5 | "Cytokines"; Transliteration: "Saitokain" (Japanese: サイトカイン) | Hitomi Ezoe | Yūko Kakihara | February 6, 2021 |
NK Cell attacks Normal Cell for insulting the immune cells, but U-1146 defuses the situation. Dendritic Cell rescues the lactic acid bacterium that fell into the storm drain and cares for it. The small intestine gets attacked by influenza. The virus has mutated and are unaffected by the immune cells' attacks, causing NK Cell to collapse in despair. The lactic acid bacterium produces Polysaccharides that power up Dendritic Cell and help him produce Cytokines, portrayed as embarrassing photos that shock the immune cells and motivate them to become stronger and wipe out the virus. After bidding farewell to the bacterium, Normal Cell apologizes to U-1146 and gives him permission to take the last bacterium he has. NK Cell informs U-1146 that Cancer Cell has returned.
| 19 | 6 | "Harmful Bacteria"; Transliteration: "Akudamakin" (Japanese: 悪玉菌) | Souta Ueno | Yūko Kakihara | February 13, 2021 |
U-1146, Normal Cell, and NK Cell go to the large intestine, which is full of toxic gas due to harmful bacteria. AE3083 joins the platelets on a tour of the large intestine. The main Killer T Cell has been promoted to a Memory T Cell and joins them in their search for Cancer Cell. U-1146 tells Normal Cell to go alone and find where the last lactic acid bacterium belongs. Harmful bacteria invade the large intestine, forcing Normal Cell to run while AE3083 helps the platelets evacuate. Cancer Cell ambushes U-1146, NK Cell, and Memory T Cell. They slay him, but it turns out to be a copy. The real one appears and beats them up, saying they will see which of them deserves to survive.
| 20 | 7 | "Cancer Cell II"; Transliteration: "Gan Saibō Tsū" (Japanese: がん細胞II) | Yasufumi Soejima & Hirofumi Ogura | Yūko Kakihara | February 20, 2021 |
| 21 | 8 | "Cancer Cell II"; Transliteration: "Gan Saibō Tsū" (Japanese: がん細胞II) | Yōhei Shindō | Yūko Kakihara | February 27, 2021 |
Part 1: Normal Cell, AE3083, and the platelets continue to evacuate. Memory T Cell remembers Cancer Cell's techniques, giving his team the advantage, but they are shocked when Regulatory T Cell defends Cancer Cell, believing he is a Normal Cell that needs to be protected. U-1146 is injured and Cancer Cell traps him in a pod, saying he's fascinated with him for the contradiction of being a defender when his function is to kill. Cancer Cell strengthens himself by absorbing the carcinogens in the toxic gas and plans to kill the body so that everyone will be equal in death. Despite hearing this, Regulatory T Cell continues to defend him and effortlessly beats up NK Cell and Memory T Cell. Normal Cell is cornered by harmful bacteria. The lactic acid bacterium tries to defend him, but is swatted aside. Normal Cell orders it to run and it does. The bacteria start torturing him. Part 2: Normal Cell is rescued by the Neutrophils, but they start getting overwhelmed by the bacteria until the lactic acid bacterium returns with its brethren and they turn the tide. With the bacteria defeated, the toxic gas dissipates. Memory T Cell uses his ultimate technique, the T Cell Perforin Cannon Punch. Although it was a made up technique taught to him as a joke, it actually works, firing a beam from his fist that damages Cancer Cell enough that Regulatory T Cell finally recognizes him as an enemy and turns against him. Cancer Cell continues to fight, but without the carcinogens in the toxic gas, he weakens. U-1146 escapes the pod and slays him, with Cancer Cell calling him his friend as he dies. As the lactic acid bacteria repair the damage, U-1146 calls Normal Cell a hero for bringing them. Memory T Cell tries to teach the Naive T Cells the T Cell Perforin Cannon Punch, but cannot replicate what he did. AE3083 catches up with U-1146 before they return to their regular routine.

== See also ==
- List of Cells at Work! Code Black episodes
