= Yuria 100 Shiki =

Japanese manga series

- First tankōbon volume cover, featuring Yuria Type 100

ユリア100式 (Yuria Hyaku-shiki)
- Genre: Erotic comedy; Romantic comedy; Science fiction
- Manga
- Written by: Shigemitsu Harada
- Illustrated by: Nobuto Hagio
- Published by: Hakusensha
- Magazine: Young Animal
- Original run: 2005 – 2010
- Volumes: 12
- Live-action film
- Directed by: Hideo Jojo
- Studio: Top Marshal
- Released: November 20, 2009
- Runtime: 76 minutes

Yuria 100 Shiki (Japanese: ユリア100式, Hepburn: Yuria Hyaku-shiki) is a Japanese manga series written by Shigemitsu Harada and illustrated by Nobuto Hagio. It was serialized in Hakusensha's seinen manga magazine Young Animal from 2005 to 2010. Its chapters were collected in twelve tankōbon volumes.

In December 2006, the Kanagawa Prefecture classified the book as harmful to minors per the prefectural youth protection laws.

A drama CD was released in 2008. A live-action adaptation was announced starring Shelly Fujii which was released in 2009.

== Plot ==
Dr. Akiba, a perverted scientist, has developed a series of gynoid Dutch wives (aka sex dolls). Yuria Type 100 is his newest creation: she has highly advanced artificial intelligence and vast sexual knowledge, and the first doll which can imprint to her master for life upon having actual sex. However, she refuses to imprint onto Akiba, and escapes from his lab. She ends up living with college student Shunsuke Kubo, where she tries to seduce him with the hopes that he can be her master, as however, he regularly refuses because he has a girlfriend and because he sees her as incredibly annoying when she acts like that. The series follows her everyday life as she tries to seduce Shunsuke. Other Dutch wife gynoids soon appear, some of whom were also invented by Akiba, thus making them Yuria's sisters, and others from competing companies. Throughout the series, there are commentaries about the technical specs of the sexual capabilities of the Yuria and other models.

== Characters ==
=== Main characters ===
- Yuria is a Yuria Type 100 (ユリア100式, Yuria 100 Shiki) female android designed with the sole purpose of being a highly interactive sex doll. Not wanting to engage in sex with her inventor, she escapes and meets Kubo Shunsuke, who gives her a place to stay. She finds herself strongly attracted to him but struggles with her programming that tells her just to please him sexually whenever she can.
- Shunsuke Kubo (久保瞬介, Kubo Shunsuke) is a college student who takes in Yuria, thinking she is a runaway. He treats her like a little sister despite the latter's strange physical advances on him, which he retaliates with different grappling holds from his hobby of pro wrestling to keep her at bay.

=== Supporting characters ===
==== Humans ====
- Dr. Ayumu Akiba (秋葉歩博士, Akiba Ayumu Hakase) is the creator of the Yuria series sex dolls, that have the habit of escaping from him once completed.
- Maria Nakamura (中村まりあ, Nakamura Maria) is introduced as Shunsuke's fiancée. She is the proud daughter of a wealthy family from Shunsuke's home town, and often expresses jealous feelings. Later, she marries Shunsuke and starts living with him and Yuria.
- Yoshio (良夫, Yoshio) is introduced as 17-year-old high school student who lets Juria stay with him. He enjoys collecting dolls and prefers them over real girls, but his interactions with Juria bother his mother. However, when he turns 18, he officially accepts Juria.
- Ippei Yamamoto (山本一平, Yamamoto Ippei) is a university student studying to be elementary school teacher. He incidentally becomes Yurin's guardian. Despite Yurin's attempts to have sex to him, Ippei just sees her as a child and tries to resist her advances for fear of being seen as a pedophile.

==== Gynoids ====
- Juria is a Yuria Type 105 (ユリア105式, Yuria 105 Shiki) model gynoid and the second of Akiba's functional dolls. She has long, dark hair and dresses in a maid costume. Also disliking Akiba's perversions, she escapes and lives as a life-size doll in Yoshio's room but restricts herself from sexually interacting with Yoshio until he turns 18.
- Yurin in a Yuria Type 108 (ユリア108式, Yuria 108 Shiki) model gynoid and the third of Akiba's functional dolls. She too does not like Akiba's perversions, and escapes, ending up with Ippei. Her child figure is capable of growing and developing according to her user's preferences as long as she is used that way.
- Yuria Type 1000 (ユリア1000式, Yuria 1000 Shiki), is a gynoid created using a special silicon polymer capable of easily changing her form, in a parody of the T-1000. Like her predecessors, she escaped from the laboratory, but without having her personality program installed, and thus she sexually assaults anyone at sight without warning. After attacking the other Yurias, she obtained data from her respective partners and goes after them as well.
- Lucy is a Lucy Mark II (ルーシーMarkII, Lucy Mark II) gynoid created in America and sent to Japan to be a rival of Yuria. Her specialty is in the American and European market, and is specialized to engage in "hardcore" sex. She is scouted to work as a model and spokesperson, but her sex-driven programming is a constant source of chagrin to her employers, who are unaware of her true identity.
- Louie is a Lucy Mark 3.5 (ルーシーMark3.5, Lucy Mark 3.5) android created in America. Due to budget cuts the Lucy 3 and Lucy 4 programs were merged, and the result is that Louie has the top half of a woman and the bottom half of a man.

== Media ==
=== Manga ===
==== Volume list ====
No.	Japanese release date	Japanese ISBN
1	August 29, 2006	978-4-592-14401-4
Type 001: Here Goes Yuria; Type 002: Unending Feelings; Type 003: Christmas Maria; Type 004: A To Z Of Love?; Type 005: Thrilling Cheerful Doll; Type 006: Yuria's Anatomy; Type 007: Sudden Love Battle; Type 008: Skinship x Skinship; Extra: Yuria 28 Shiki
2	November 29, 2006	978-4-592-14402-1
Type 009: 100 vs 105; Type 010: Goddess in Love!; Type 011: Worry Sale!?; Type 012: Yuria-chan's Cuisine; Type 013: Beach Boys & Girls; Type 014: A Somewhat Brave Story; Type 015: Japan's Summer, Yuria's Summer; Type 016: Continued: Thrilling Cheerful Soll; Extra: Mass Production Grade Yuria
3	March 29, 2007	978-4-592-14403-8
Type 017: We Wouldn't Want Yuria To Be Damaged; Type 018: New Relationship; Type 019: Never Ending Summer; Type 020: Black Sun; Type 021: Kanokon; Type 022: Yuria Libre; Type 023: Closing; Type 024: Thrill After Thrill Cheerful Doll; Extra: My Wife, Yuria Type 100
4	June 27, 2007	978-4-592-14404-5
Type 025: Nursing Yuria; Type 026: Couple's Winter Story; Type 027: Maria, Here I Come!?; Type 028: Lusty Yuria; Type 029: Yurin Will Make it Better!; Type 030: Camping & Fishing; Type 031: (Lit)mus; Type 032: Drive with Yuria; Extra: Secret From Mom
5	December 20, 2007	978-4-592-14405-2
Type 033: The Next Generation; Type 034: 100th Comic Generation; Type 035: Contribution Yuria Kingdom; Type 036: Will You Come Today?; Type 037: Yuria 3 Stars; Type 038: Cast Away On Some Island; Type 039: Intense Island; Type 040: On a Deserted Island, Eternally.; Extra: Kimiyuria
6	March 28, 2008	978-4-592-14406-9
Type 041: Get Up Lucy; Type 042: A Doll Born In America; Type 043: J-Girl; Type 044: NS (New Skill); Type 045: Mentore gj; Type 046: Pride Male Female Festival; Type 047: Kodomotachi No Jikan; Type 048: Yuria Fes; Extra: Lucy's 3 Minute Fucking
7	May 27, 2008	978-4-592-14407-6
Type 049: Recall?!; Type 050: Mountains; Type 051: Threatening Black Ship; Type 052: American Idol Master; Type 053: Holy Mother Juria; Type 054: Most Dangerous Combination; Type 055: Abstinence & Lust; Type 056: Doubt∞; Extra: Yuria 100 Shiki Mini
8	October 29, 2008	978-4-592-14408-3
Type 057: Black Ship 2; Type 058: Sisters? Brother & Sister?; Type 059: For Ambition; Type 060: Divination Heaven; Type 061: Drinking Party Queen; Type 062: Strange Pet!?; Type 063: Monthly Lucy; Type 064: Plunder Body; Extra: Yuria 100 Shiki Mini
9	March 27, 2009	978-4-592-14409-0
Type 065: Tomorrow's Yoshio; Type 066: The Great Detective Yurin Is Born!?; Type 067: Wound Covered Yuria!?; Type 068: Shadow Lover; Type 069: Scandalucy; Type 070: Can You Celebrate?; Type 071: Chased To The Islands!?; Type 072: Viva Kekkon!?; Extra: Yuria 100 Shiki Mini
10	July 29, 2009	978-4-592-14410-6
Type 073: Who Are Husband And Wife!?; Type 074: Eve Of The 18th; Type 075: Continuation - Eve Of The 18th; Type 076: Child's Play; Type 077: Definitely More; Type 078: 'Karitaka' Travel Log 1; Type 079: 'Karitaka' Travel Log 2; Type 080: 'Karitaka' Travel Log 3; Type 081: You Are The Costume Master; Extra: ?
11	November 27, 2009	978-4-592-14651-3
Type 082: Ah! Kiss!; Type 083: Deli? Loli? Hmm?; Type 084: Pregnancy Avenger Super Fight Back; Type 085: Amateur's Course to Dicking; Type 086: Champion! Love! Carnival!; Type 087: Hame Hame Ha; Type 088: Beach Yurias; Type 089: Nurse of the Beach; Type 090: Cunninhiko Kaneda's Scary Story; Extra: That Man, a Super Lecher
12	March 29, 2010	978-4-592-14652-0
Type 091: What's Your Name, Onee-san; Type 092: Yuria Illusion; Type 093: The School-Bound Meat-Rail Express; Type 094: Yuria Arts Type 100; Type 095: Outdoor? Huh?; Type 096: Yuria T-1000 Obtained

=== Live-action ===
A live action adaptation was released on November 20, 2009, in Japan. Yuria is played by Shelly Fujii and the movie is directed by Hideo Jojo (Gachi-ban).

== See also ==
- Cells at Work! Code Black, another manga series written by Shigemitsu Harada
- Ippatsu Kiki Musume, another manga series by Shigemitsu Harada
- Witches Are In Their Prime In Their Three-Hundreds, another manga series written by Shigemitsu Harada
- Megami no Sprinter, another manga series written by Shigemitsu Harada
- Motoyome, another manga series written by Shigemitsu Harada
