= Roger Rhodes =

Canadian voice artist (born 1965)

- Born: August 2, 1965 (age 60); Calgary, Alberta, Canada
- Occupation: Voice actor
- Years active: 1985–present

Roger Rhodes (born August 2, 1965) is a Canadian voice artist who works with Blue Water Studios. He is well known for having voiced Vegeta in the Canadian version of Dragon Ball GT.

Rhodes lives in Calgary with his wife Alice and daughter Amy, where he is also a DJ at the CKRY-FM radio station.

Rhodes attended the Sir Winston Churchill High School during the 1980s.

== Filmography ==
=== Animation ===
- Weebles - Winston Hobnobby III, Demby Wishingwell, Spotlight #1, Plug, Where O'Where

=== Anime ===
- Cardfight!! Vanguard - Ren, MC Mya
- Deltora Quest - Ferdinand, Grey Guard, Thaegan's Children
- Dragon Ball - Korin, General Blue (Blue Water dub)
- Dragon Ball GT - Kibito Kai, Vegeta (Blue Water dub)
- Flame of Recca - Narrator, Kondo, Shigeo Hanabishi
- Future Card Buddyfight - Black Death Dragon, Abygale, Elf Kabala
- Gregory Horror Show - Cactus Gunman
- The Law of Ueki - Karlpaccho
- Lost Chapter of the Stars - Birth - Dubas Abriel
- Mobile Fighter G Gundam - Chibodee Crocket
- Mobile Suit Zeta Gundam - Jamaican Daninghan
- Pretty Cure - Mepple, Chuutaro, Principal, Terry Blackstone (Episode 40)
- Scan2Go - DJ, Utan
- Transformers: Cybertron - Additional Voices

=== Video games ===
- Crimson Tears - Tokio
- Dynasty Warriors: Gundam - Crown, Torres
- Dynasty Warriors: Gundam 2 - Jamaican Daninghan, Torres
- Dynasty Warriors: Gundam 3 - Apolly Bay
- Gregory Horror Show: Soul Collector - Cactus Gunman
- Gundam: Battle Assault 2 - Chibodee Crocket
- Mega Man Maverick Hunter X - Vile, Sting Chameleon
- Mega Man Powered Up - Fire Man
- Mega Man X8 - Gravity Antonion, Signas, Vile
- Mobile Suit Gundam: Gundam vs. Zeta Gundam - Jamaican Daninghan
- We Love Golf! - Announcer
