= Katsumi Suzuki =

Japanese voice actor

- 鈴木 勝美
- Born: August 5, 1956 (age 70); Aichi, Japan
- Occupation: Voice actor
- Years active: 1982–present
- Agent: 81 Produce
- Height: 176 cm (5 ft 9 in)

Katsumi Suzuki (鈴木 勝美, Suzuki Katsumi; born August 5, 1956) is a Japanese voice actor. He is best known as the voice of Kagome's grandfather in Inuyasha after Ginzo Matsuo's death, and as the voice of Diddy Kong in many of Nintendo's video games since 2004 starting with Mario Power Tennis. He currently works at 81 Produce.

== Filmography ==
=== Television animation ===
1982

- Super Dimension Fortress Macross - Hayao Kakizaki and Warera Nantes

1993

- YuYu Hakusho - Elder Toguro

1996

- YAT Anshin! Uchū Ryokō - Ucchi

1999

- Gregory Horror Show - Frog Fortune Teller, Mirror Man

2001

- Inuyasha - Grandpa Higurashi (second voice)

2002

- Tenchi Muyo! GXP - Mr. Yamada

2003

- Kaleido Star - Ben Robbins

2006

- Bleach - Ugaki

2020

- Yashahime: Princess Half-Demon - Grandpa Higurashi

2021

- Let's Make a Mug Too - Jūbe Aoki

Unknown date

- Rairai in Mahoujin Guru Guru
- Yan in Double Zeta Gundam
- Hadat in Ys ~Tenkuu no Shinden~
- Mu / Uin Iju in Idol Angel Yokoso Yoko
- Nagoya Willow in Nangoku Shōnen Papuwa-kun
- Might Gunner in The Brave Express Might Gaine
- Umao in Kimagure Orange Road

=== Original video animation (OVA) ===
- Here is Greenwood (1991) (Bonda, teacher)
- Legend of the Galactic Heroes (1991) (Molt)
- Idol Defense Force Hummingbird (1993) (Shinobu Ijūin)
- Iria: Zeiram the Animation (1994) (Government suit)

=== Theatrical animation ===
- The Super Dimension Fortress Macross: Do You Remember Love? (1984) (Hayao Kakizaki)
- Spriggen (1998) (Little Boy)
- Inuyasha the Movie: Affections Touching Across Time (2001) (Grandpa)
- Inuyasha the Movie: Swords of an Honorable Ruler (2003) (Grandpa)

=== Video games ===
- Crash Team Racing (1999) (Ripper Roo (Dallas McKennon))
- Donkey Kong series (2007–present) (Diddy Kong)
- Gregory Horror Show (2003) (Frog Fortune Teller)
- Philosoma (1995) (D3)
- Soul Nomad & the World Eaters (2007) (Vangogh)
- Super Mario Bros. series (2004–present) (Diddy Kong)
- Stupid Invaders (2001) (Stereo Monovici, Nelson)
- Super Robot Wars series (2000–present) (Hayao Kakizaki, Liebe, Might Gunner, Purple)

=== Dubbing roles ===
==== Live action ====
- Hudson Hawk – Kit Kat (David Caruso)
- Mighty Morphin Power Rangers – Alpha 5 (Richard Steven Horvitz)
- She-Wolf of London – Villager
- Small Soldiers – Slamfist (Christopher Guest)
- Star Wars: Episode III – Revenge of the Sith – Nute Gunray (Silas Carson)
- Triloquist – The Dummy (Bruce Weitz)

==== Animation ====
- Batman: The Animated Series – Ted Dymer
- CatDog – Eddie the Squirrel
- Corpse Bride – William Van Dort
- Courage the Cowardly Dog – The Great Fusilli
- Cow and Chicken – Red Guy, Flem
- Dexter's Laboratory – Mandark
- Finding Nemo – Tad's Dad
- Justice League – Copperhead
- The Powerpuff Girls (UG dub) – Mayor, Him, Ace
- Rocko's Modern Life: Static Cling – Mr. Dupette
- Rolie Polie Olie – Additional Voices
- The Ren & Stimpy Show – Haggis McHaggis
- Sitting Ducks – Waddle
- South Park – Tweek Tweak (Season 2)
- Space Goofs – Stereo Monovici
- Squirrel Boy – Leon
- Wallace & Gromit: The Curse of the Were-Rabbit – PC Macintosh
- Who Framed Roger Rabbit – Bugs Bunny, Droopy, Greasy
- The Wild Thornberries – Darwin, Donnie
