= Megami no Sprinter =

Japanese manga series

- First tankōbon volume cover

女神のスプリンター (Megami no Supurintā)
- Genre: Sex comedy
- Manga
- Written by: Shigemitsu Harada
- Illustrated by: Karoti
- Published by: Kodansha
- Magazine: Monthly Young Magazine
- Original run: November 21, 2017 – November 18, 2021
- Volumes: 7
- icon

Megami no Sprinter (Japanese: 女神のスプリンター, Hepburn: Megami no Supurintā; lit. 'The Goddess's Sprinter') is a Japanese manga series written by Shigemitsu Harada and illustrated by Karoti. It was serialized in Kodansha's seinen manga magazine Monthly Young Magazine from November 2017 to November 2021, with its chapters collected in seven tankōbon volumes.

== Publication ==
Written by Shigemitsu Harada and illustrated by Karoti, Megami no Sprinter was serialized in Kodansha's seinen manga magazine Monthly Young Magazine from November 21, 2017, to November 18, 2021. Kodansha collected its chapters in seven tankōbon volumes, released from June 6, 2018, to January 20, 2022.

=== Volumes ===
No.	Japanese release date	Japanese ISBN
1	June 6, 2018	978-4-06-511680-7
2	January 4, 2019	978-4-06-514162-5
3	August 6, 2019	978-4-06-516730-4
4	March 6, 2020	978-4-06-518839-2
5	November 6, 2020	978-4-06-521339-1
6	June 17, 2021	978-4-06-523338-2
7	January 20, 2022	978-4-06-526475-1

== See also ==
- Cells at Work! Code Black, another manga series by the same writer
- Ippatsu Kiki Musume, another manga series by the same writer
- Motoyome, another manga series written by the same writer
- Yuria 100 Shiki, another manga series written by the same writer
- Witches Are In Their Prime In Their Three-Hundreds, another manga series written by the same writer
