= Witches Are In Their Prime In Their Three-Hundreds =

Japanese manga series

- First tankōbon volume cover

魔女は三百路から
- Genre: Comedy, slice of life
- Manga
- Written by: Shigemitsu Harada
- Illustrated by: Kyūjo Matsumoto
- Published by: Hakusensha
- English publisher: NA: Pocket Comics
- Imprint: Young Animal Comics
- Magazine: Young Animal Arashi (2018); Young Animal (2018–2020)
- Original run: January 4, 2018 – May 22, 2020
- Volumes: 7
- icon

Witches Are In Their Prime In Their Three-Hundreds (魔女は三百路から, Majo wa Mioji Kara) is a Japanese manga series written by Shigemitsu Harada and illustrated by Kyūjo Matsumoto. It was serialized in Hakusensha's seinen manga magazines Young Animal Arashi (2018) and Young Animal (2018–2020), with its chapters collected in seven tankōbon volumes.

== Publication ==
Written by Shigemitsu Harada and illustrated by Kyūjo Matsumoto, Witches Are In Their Prime In Their Three-Hundreds was serialized in Hakusensha's seinen manga magazine Young Animal Arashi from January 4 to June 1, 2018, when the magazine ceased its publication. The series was later transferred to Young Animal, where it ran from July 13, 2018, to May 22, 2020. Hakusensha collected its chapters in seven tankōbon volumes, released from October 29, 2018, to September 29, 2020.

The series was published in English on Comico Japan's Pocket Comics website and app.

=== Volumes ===
No.	Release date	ISBN
1	October 29, 2018	978-4-592-16281-0
2	February 28, 2019	978-4-592-16282-7
3	June 28, 2019	978-4-592-16283-4
4	November 29, 2019	978-4-592-16284-1
5	March 27, 2020	978-4-592-16285-8
6	July 29, 2020	978-4-592-16286-5
7	September 29, 2020	978-4-592-16287-2

== See also ==
- Cells at Work! Code Black, another manga series by the same writer
- Ippatsu Kiki Musume, another manga series by the same writer
- Megami no Sprinter, another manga series by the same writer
- Motoyome, another manga series by the same authors
- Yuria 100 Shiki, another manga series by the same writer
