= Motoyome =

Japanese manga series

- First tankōbon volume cover

モトヨメ
- Genre: Erotic comedy
- Manga
- Written by: Shigemitsu Harada
- Illustrated by: Kyūjo Matsumoto
- Published by: Hakusensha
- Imprint: Jets Comics (series 1–2); Young Animal Comics (series 3–4)
- Magazine: Young Animal Arashi
- Original run: November 1, 2013 – August 4, 2017
- Volumes: 4

Motoyome (モトヨメ) is a Japanese manga series written by Shigemitsu Harada and illustrated by Kyūjo Matsumoto. It was published in Hakusensha's seinen manga magazine Young Animal Arashi from November 2013 to June 2014; a second series, Motoyome: Onna Shachō-hen, was serialized in the same magazine from May to December 2015; a third series, Motoyome: Elite Joi-hen, was serialized from February to September 2016; a fourth series, Motoyome: Joryū Kadōka-hen, was serialized from January to August 2017. The four series as a whole were collected in four tankōbon volumes.

== Publication ==
Written by Shigemitsu Harada and illustrated by Kyūjo Matsumoto, Motoyome was serialized in Hakusensha's seinen manga magazine Young Animal Arashi from November 1, 2013, June 6, 2014. Its chapters were collected in a single tankōbon volume, released on August 29, 2014. A second series, Motoyome: Onna Shachō-hen (女社長編), was serialized in the same magazine from May 1 to December 4, 2015. Its chapters were collected in a single tankōbon, released on February 29, 2016. A third series, Motoyome: Elite Joi-hen (モトヨメ エリート女医編, Motoyome Erīto Joi-hen), was serialized from February 5 to September 2, 2016. Its chapters were collected in a single tankōbon, released on November 29, 2016. A fourth series, Motoyome: Joryū Kadōka-hen (モトヨメ 女流華道家編), was serialized from January 6 to August 4, 2017. Its chapters were collected in a single tankōbon, released on October 27, 2017.

=== Volumes ===
No.	Japanese release date	Japanese ISBN
1	August 29, 2014	978-4-592-14148-8
2	February 29, 2016	978-4-592-14149-5
3	November 29, 2016	978-4-592-14150-1
4	October 27, 2017	978-4-592-14557-8

== See also ==
- Cells at Work! Code Black, another manga series by the same writer series by the same writer
- Ippatsu Kiki Musume, another manga series by the same writer series by the same writer
- Megami no Sprinter, another manga series by the same writer series by the same writer
- Witches Are In Their Prime In Their Three-Hundreds, another manga series by the same writer series by the same authors
- Yuria 100 Shiki, another manga series by the same writer series by the same writer
