= Erina Yamazaki =

Japanese voice actress

Erina Yamazaki (山崎 依里奈, Yamazaki Erina; born May 10, 1974 in Tokyo, Japan) is a Japanese voice actress affiliated with 81 Produce.

== Voice roles ==
=== Anime ===
- Bakusou Kyoudai Let's & Go!! MAX (Keichi Saijou)
- Gregory Horror Show (James)
- Hanaukyo Maid Team (Joshou (episode 7))
- Let's Dance With Papa (Fukko Amachi)
- Panyo Panyo Di Gi Charat (Newborn Chick)

=== Tokusatsu ===
- Denji Sentai Megaranger (NeziPink (eps. 38 - 40, 47 - 48)/NeziJealous (ep. 40, 48))
- Kamen Rider Kiva (Moth Fiangire (ep. 3 - 4))

=== Dubbing ===
- Thomas the Tank Engine & Friends (Emily (Succeeding Yuka Shioyama), Frieda, The Second Slip Coach, An An and The Duchess of Boxford (Replacing Kumiko Itō))
