= Yuriko Yamaguchi (voice actress) =

Japanese voice actress (born 1965)

- 山口 由里子
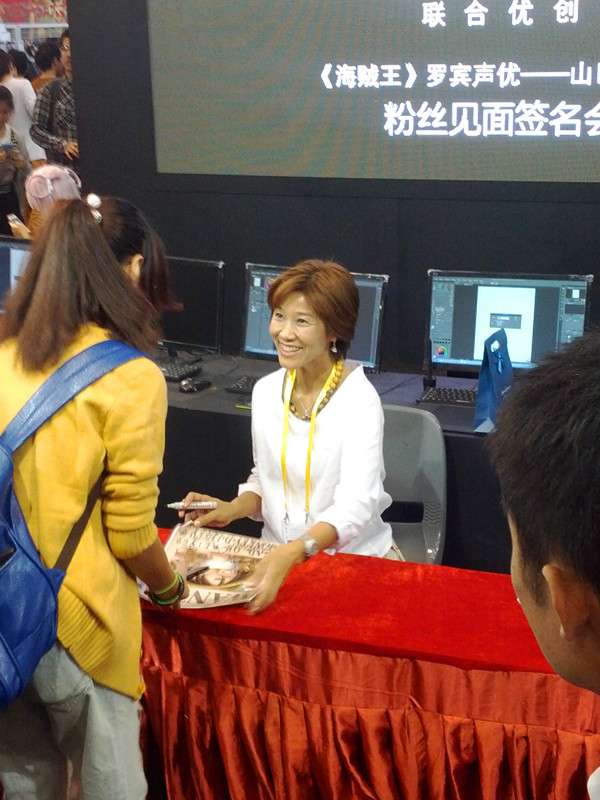
- Yamaguchi at the 2013 Xiamen International Animation Festival
- Born: November 21, 1965 (age 60); Osaka Prefecture, Japan
- Status: Married
- Other names: Mai Kannazuki (神無月舞); Shibatoshi Kurauchi (鞍打芝利); Mayuko Kuriyama (栗山真由子); Botan Izumi (和泉牡丹)
- Occupations: Voice actress; narrator
- Years active: 1990–present
- Agent: Aoni Production
- Children: 1

Yuriko Yamaguchi (山口 由里子, Yamaguchi Yuriko; born November 21, 1965) is a Japanese voice actress and narrator previously with Vi-Vo and currently affiliated with Aoni Production.

Her major roles include Nico Robin in One Piece, Ritsuko Akagi in Neon Genesis Evangelion, Sonia in Eureka Seven and Nurse Joy in Pokémon.

== Filmography ==
=== Animation ===
List of voice performances in animation
Year	Title	Role	Notes	Source
1992	Crayon Shin-chan	Education critic, Kyoko Fukaya		
1994	Montana Jones	Low		
1995	Azuki-chan	Saeko Sakaguchi		
1995	Wedding Peach	Kachūsha, woman devil		
1995	Neon Genesis Evangelion	Ritsuko Akagi		
1996	Magical Project S	Yukie (Mrs. Cinq)	Ep. 16-17	
1997–2010	Pokémon	Nurse Joy	through Diamond & Pearl	
1997	Tenchi in Tokyo	Matori		
1997	Kindaichi Case Files	Various characters		
1997	Shinkai Densetsu Meremanoid	Drago		
1997	Battle Athletes	Lahrri Feldnunt	Also Victory	
1997	Vampire Princess Miyu	Masaki's mother, Shinma Nami		
1997	I Dream of Mimi	Forte		
1998	Fancy Lala	Wonder Okayama	Ep. 20	
1998	Midnight Panther	Sonya	Adult OVA	
1998	Kurogane Communication	Haruka's mother		
1998	Generator Gawl	Ryuko Saito		
1999	Phantom Thief Jeanne	Daughter of Saegusa	Ep. 9	
1999	Pet Shop of Horrors	Mrs. Hayward		
1999	Tournament of the Gods	Serena	OVA adult series	
1999	Detective Conan	Shizuka Kawai		
1999	Omishi Magical Theater: Risky Safety	Moe's mother		
1999	Restol, The Special Rescue Squad	Teacher		
1999–present	One Piece	Nico Robin, Nico Olvia, Kikyo		
2000	Mon Colle Knights	Tiamat		
2000	Carried by the Wind: Tsukikage Ran	Heir of Matsuzaka		
2000	Saiyuki	Sanbutsushin		
2000	Hajime no Ippo	Mama-san		
2000	Inuyasha	Shizu		
2001	Noir	Paulette		
2001	Shaman King	Matilda		
2002–2005	Full Metal Panic! series	Nora Lemming	Also The Second Raid	
2002	Rahxephon	Relative		
2002	Daigunder	Jimmy's mother		
2002	Mirmo	Shochiku's mother		
2002	Petite Princess Yucie	Magic teacher		
2002	Monkey Typhoon	Rock's mother		
2002	Naruto	Orochimaru		
2003–2004	Gunparade March series	Umekura, Comtesse	Starting with The New March	
2003	Kaleido Star	Cynthia Benigni		
2003	Zatch Bell!	Balansha		
2003	Croket!	Queen		
2003	Dear Boys	Tamami Kano		
2003	Requiem from the Darkness	NoboriKazu 登和		
2003	Fullmetal Alchemist	Sarah Rockbell		
2003–2006	Megaman NT Warrior series	Rin Manabe	Starting with Axxess	
2004	Kaiketsu Zorori	Okisaki-sama		
2004	Kyo Kara Maoh!	Norika		
2004	Hanaukyo Maid Team La Verite	Shikouin		
2004	Agatha Christie's Great Detectives Poirot and Marple	Mrs. Robinson		
2004	Tsukuyomi: Moon Phase	Danso no josei 断層の女性		
2005–2006	Tsubasa Reservoir Chronicle	Chenyan チェニャン		
2005	Eureka Seven	Sonia Wakabayashi		
2007	Naruto Shippuden	Kusanin-Orochimaru		
2008–2009	Koihime Musou	Sun Jing 孫静		
2008	Clannad After Story	Yagi		
2008	A Certain Magical Index	Himekami mother 姫神母親		
2008	Michiko and Hatchin	Rene		
2009	Mainichi Kaasan	Iwamura's mother, Hikokun		
2009	Arad Senki: Slap Up Party	Binoshu, Keraha		
2011	Yu-Gi-Oh Zexal	Voice		
2013	Detective Conan	Hiruka Sorimoto		
2013	Kyōsōgiga	Knight		
2015	Death Parade	Misaki Tachibana		
2015	Blood Blockade Battlefront	Woman		
2015	Dragon Ball Super	Vados	Whole series	
2016–2017	Reikenzan	Obu	2 seasons	
2017	Kirakira PreCure a la Mode	Satomi Usami		
2018	Aikatsu Friends!	Mai Chōno		
2024	Dahlia in Bloom	Gabriella Jedda		
2025	Kowloon Generic Romance	Kujirai B		

=== Film ===
List of voice performances in anime
Year	Title	Role	Notes	Source
1999	Cardcaptor Sakura: The Movie	Li Fudi		
2000	Ah! My Goddess: The Movie	Yggdrasil		
2003–present	One Piece films	Nico Robin		
2005	Rockman EXE Hikari to Yami no Program	Rin Manabe		
2007	Rebuild of Evangelion series	Ritsuko Akagi		
2008	Pokémon: Giratina and the Sky Warrior	Joy		
2010	Time of Eve	Dr. Ashimori		
2010	Pokémon: Zoroark: Master of Illusions	Joy		
2021	Evangelion: 3.0+1.0 Thrice Upon a Time	Ritsuko Akagi		
2022	Detective Conan: The Bride of Halloween	Christine Richard		

=== Tokusatsu ===
List of voice performances in tokusatsu
Year	Title	Role	Notes	Source
2003	Bakuryu Sentai Abaranger	Trinoid #20: Rougirafflesia	Ep. 38 - 39	

=== Drama CD ===
List of voice performances in audio dramas
Year	Title	Role	Notes	Source
	Neon Genesis Evangelion	Ritsuko Akagi		
	Princess Quest	Emanuelle, Charlotte		

=== Video games ===
List of voice performances in video games
Year	Title	Role	Notes	Source
1996–97, 2007	Neon Genesis Evangelion games	Ritsuko Akagi		
1997	Boys Be...	Minako Oikawa	PS1/PS2	
1997	Dokyusei 2	Sachiko Nagashima	PC Adult	
1997–98	Galaxy Fraulein Yuna	Ten'oniin-Yoshioni 天鬼院・美鬼	3: Lightning Angel, Final Edition	
1998	Princess Quest R	Charlotte	SS	
2002	Unlimited Saga	Sapphire, Grace	PS1/PS2	
2004	Zatch Bell!! Fierce fight! The strongest demon who	Baransha	PS1/PS2	
2006	Tengai Makyou: Ziria	Itohime, Arachne	Xbox 360 version	
2006	Gunparade March series	Earl	PS1/PS2	
2007	Tales of Fandom Vol.2	Kate	PS1/PS2	
2008	Tales of Hearts	Sheera Hearts	DS	
2012–14	One Piece games	Nico Robin		
2012	Conception: Ore no Kodomo o Undekure!	Reone	PSP	
2014	Sailor Moon Crystal	Ien Kyoju 異園教授		
2019	World of Tanks	Japanese Commander (female)	PC / Xbox Versions	
2025	Genshin Impact	Rhinedottir	Replaced Atsuko Tanaka after her death	

=== Dubbing ===
- Independence Day: Resurgence, Elizabeth Lanford (Sela Ward)
