= Tournament of the Gods =

H-game created by Alicesoft

- Tōshin Toshi 2 visual novel cover

闘神都市II (Tōshin Toshi 2)
- Genre: Fantasy, Erotic
- Video game
- Publisher: Alicesoft
- Genre: Visual novel, RPG
- Platform: NEC PC-98; Fujitsu FM Towns; Microsoft Windows
- Released: 1994
- Original video animation
- Directed by: Takehiro Nakayama
- Studio: Pink Pineapple
- Released: 1997
- Episodes: 3
- Video game

Tōshin Toshi Girls Gift
- Developer: Imageepoch
- Genre: Visual novel, RPG
- Platform: Nintendo 3DS
- Released: January 30, 2014

Tournament of the Gods (闘神都市II, Tōshin Toshi 2) is a H-game by Alicesoft.

== Plot ==
Sid enters a tournament. Shortly after he is crowned champion, the fallen Angel Aquross infects him with a hideous disease that requires him to steal the life energy of Angels or be in constant pain. The only relief lies in a drug that kills the pain, but causes sexual urges that cannot be denied. Now, Sid must defeat the evil Aquross.

== OVA ==
It was condensed into a single 35-minute episode and released in the US as a subtitled white-cassette VHS by Pink Pineapple studio.

=== Episodes ===
Image	Episode	Japanese title	Japanese translation	Story
	1	青嵐篇	Blue Storm Chapter	The tournament of the Gods is a tournament where gladiators enter with a female companion, if the male gladiator loses the winner gets the girl. The girl must listen to the winner's every wish for 24 hours. Meanwhile, a young Sid enters the tournament with one hope of winning a young lady he has fallen in love with.
	2	激闘篇	Intense Fighting Chapter	After winning the first round of the tournament, Sid begins to despair that winning might be worse than losing. Sid isn't sure that he can go on. Thinking of his beloved Azuki is making him to continue the tournament, no matter what the cost.
	3	血戦篇	Blood Battle Chapter	Sid is crowned as the champion of the Tournament of the Gods, but Sid fears are realised when he is poisoned by the seductive but lethal Aquross, which causes Sid to be almost paralyzed. The only relief is a drug that causes insatiable sexual longing. So, Sid must face the deadly Aquross while facing bouts of intense agony and unquenchable sexual longing in order to end the tournament forever.

=== Theme songs ===
- "Yume no Image" by Konami Yoshida

=== Cast ===
Character name	Voice actor (Japanese)
Sid	Akira Ishida
Hazuki Mizuhara	Konami Yoshida
Selena	Yuriko Yamaguchi
Craiya (クライア)	Akiko Yajima
Sayaka	Ikue Ohtani
Aquross	Miki Itou

== Reception ==
Mike Toole comparing the OVA to Gor did not find it very interesting. Chris Beveridge commented that the video "is a strange piece" and has "some good fun moments".
