= Princess Quest =

1998 video game

- Original Japanese Boxart (for Sega Saturn)
- Developer(s): AIC Spirits; Increment P Corp.
- Publisher(s): Increment P Corp.
- Artist(s): Sugiyama Genshō
- Platform(s): Sega Saturn, PC
- Release: JP: March 19, 1998
- Genre(s): Role-playing game

Princess Quest (プリンセスクエスト, Purinsesu Kuesuto) is a Japanese video game published in 1998 for the Sega Saturn system. It was subsequently ported to PC under the title Princess Quest R (プリンセスクエストR, Purinsesu Kuesuto R).

The story is set in the Dharma Kingdom, and involves the theft of a jewel. Clues must be sought after in dungeons, castles, and towns, until the true culprit is found.

== Development ==
The game was illustrated by Sugiyama Genshō. It was based on a 1996 audio drama of the same name. The game was developed by AIC Spirits and Increment P Corp.

== Gameplay ==
Princess Quest is an action role playing game.

While the gameplay can be described as a classic turn-based role-playing video game, the main focus of the game is on interacting with the non-player characters and discovering what they are up to.

Princess Quest features several short anime video clips, as well as spoken dialog (in Japanese) throughout the game.

== Story ==
Five princesses from surrounding kingdoms are visiting Granmalnie Castle (グランマルニエ城), but young Prince Tapioca isn't showing much interest. Meanwhile, someone makes off with a valuable item. Queen Madeleine hires a young swordsman named Willow to investigate the theft. Willow is joined by Pal (パル), a magical creature who transforms Willow into a girl, named Will. Using this disguise, Willow tries to gain the trust of the princesses, in hopes of determining who is responsible for the theft.

== Cast ==
- Willow (ウィロー, Uiro) - The young hero who comes to Granmalnie Castle. Voiced by: Shin-ichiro Miki (三木 眞一郎)
- Will (ウィル, Uiru) - Willow's female form. Voice actor: Yoko Asada (浅田 葉子)
- Pal (パル, Paru) - A cabbit who takes the form of a bracelet which effects Willow's magical transformation. Voiced by: Rei Sakuma (佐久間 レイ)
- Montblanc (モンブラン, Monburan) - King of Dilma. Voiced by: Kiyoshi Kawakubo (川久保 潔)
- Madeleine (マドレーヌ, Madorēnu) - Queen of Dilma. Voiced by: Masako Katsuki (勝生 真沙子)
- Tapioca (タピオカ, Tapioka) - Prince of Dilma. Voiced by: Emi Shinohara (篠原 恵美)
- Custard (カスタード, Kasutādo) - Princess of Rarian. Voiced by: Sakura Tange (丹下 桜)
- Millefeuille (ミルフィーユ, Mirufīyu) - Princess of Northland. Voiced by: Yuri Shiratori (白鳥 由里)
- Gelato (ジェラード, Jerādo) - Princess of Soodaresu. Voiced by: Mifuyu Hiiragi (柊 美冬)
- Churros (チェロス, Cherosu) - Princess of Rouresu. Voiced by: Ai Orikasa (折笠 愛)
- Pannacotta (パンナコッタ, Pannakotta) - Princess of Gimuria. Voiced by: Kikuko Inoue (井上 喜久子)

== Release ==
Princess Quest was released on March 19, 1998, for the Sega Saturn console in Japan. It was the re-released for the PC under the title Princess Quest R.

== Reception ==
Upon release, four reviewers from Famitsu gave it a score of 21 out of 40.
