= Cells at Work! =

Japanese manga series by Akane Shimizu

- First tankōbon volume cover, featuring Red Blood Cell AE3803 and White Blood Cell U-1146

はたらく細胞 (Hataraku Saibō)
- Genre: Biology; Fantasy comedy
- Manga
- Written by: Akane Shimizu
- Published by: Kodansha
- English publisher: NA: Kodansha USA
- Magazine: Monthly Shōnen Sirius
- Original run: January 26, 2015 – January 26, 2021
- Volumes: 6
Further information
Manga
Cells at Work!: Bacteria!
Written by	Haruyuki Yoshida
Published by	Kodansha
English publisher	NA: Kodansha USA
Magazine	Nakayoshi
Original run	April 3, 2017 – July 3, 2020
Volumes	7
Manga
Cells NOT at Work!
Written by	Moe Sugimoto
Published by	Kodansha
English publisher	NA: Kodansha USA
Magazine	Monthly Shōnen Sirius
Original run	July 26, 2017 – November 26, 2021
Volumes	5
Anime television series
Directed by	Kenichi Suzuki (S1); Hirofumi Ogura (S2)
Produced by	Yuma Takahashi
Written by	Yūko Kakihara; Kenichi Suzuki
Music by	Kenichiro Suehiro; Mayuko
Studio	David Production
Licensed by	AUS: Madman Entertainment; BI: MVM Entertainment; NA: Aniplex of America; SA/SEA: Muse Communication
Original network	Tokyo MX, GYT, BS11, MBS, TV Aichi, HBC, RKB
English network	SEA: Animax Asia
Original run	July 8, 2018 – February 27, 2021
Episodes	21 + Special
Light novel
Written by	Yui Tokiumi
Illustrated by	Akane Shimizu
Published by	Kodansha
Published	July 12, 2018
Manga
Cells at Work and Friends!
Written by	Kanna Kurono
Illustrated by	Mio Izumi
Published by	Kodansha
English publisher	NA: Kodansha USA
Magazine	Bessatsu Friend
Original run	January 12, 2019 – April 13, 2021
Volumes	6
Manga
Cells at Work!: Platelets!
Written by	Yuuko Kakihara
Illustrated by	Yasu
Published by	Kodansha
English publisher	NA: Kodansha USA
Magazine	Monthly Shōnen Sirius
Original run	May 25, 2019 – April 26, 2021
Volumes	4
Manga
Cells at Work!: Baby!
Written by	Yasuhiro Fukuda
Published by	Kodansha
English publisher	NA: Kodansha USA
Magazine	Morning
Original run	October 17, 2019 – October 7, 2021
Volumes	4
Manga
Cells at Work!: Lady!
Written by	Shigemitsu Harada
Illustrated by	Akari Otokawa
Published by	Kodansha
English publisher	NA: Kodansha USA
Magazine	Morning Two
Original run	January 22, 2020 – September 26, 2022
Volumes	5
Anime film
"Hataraku Saibō!!" Saikyō no Teki, Futatabi. Karada no Naka wa "Chō" Ōsawagi!
Directed by	Hirofumi Ogura
Written by	Yūko Kakihara
Music by	Kenichiro Suehiro; Mayuko
Studio	David Production
Licensed by	SA/SEA: Muse Communication
Released	September 5, 2020
Runtime	112 minutes
Manga
Cells at Work!: White Brigade
Written by	Tetsuji Kanie
Published by	Kodansha
English publisher	NA: Kodansha USA
Magazine	Monthly Shōnen Sirius
Original run	October 26, 2020 – July 26, 2022
Volumes	4
Manga
Cells at Work!: Neo Bacteria
Written by	Haruyuki Yoshida
Published by	Kodansha
English publisher	NA: Kodansha USA
Magazine	Nakayoshi; Palcy
Original run	December 28, 2020 – February 22, 2021
Volumes	1
Manga
Cells at Work!: Illegal
Written by	Kae Hashimoto
Published by	Kodansha
Magazine	YanMaga Web
Original run	February 1, 2022 – July 18, 2023
Volumes	4
Manga
Cells at Work!: Muscle
Written by	Yū Maeda
Published by	Kodansha
Magazine	Morning Two
Original run	February 16, 2023 – February 20, 2025
Volumes	5
Manga
Cells at Work! Cat
Written by	Choco Aozora
Illustrated by	Meku Kaire
Published by	Kodansha
English publisher	NA: Kodansha USA
Magazine	Monthly Shōnen Sirius
Original run	May 25, 2023 – March 26, 2026
Volumes	5
Manga
Cells at Work!: Medicine
Written by	Koma Warita
Illustrated by	Ryō Kuji
Published by	Kodansha
Magazine	Monthly Shōnen Sirius
Original run	May 25, 2023 – May 26, 2025
Volumes	4
Live-action film
Directed by	Hideki Takeuchi
Written by	Yuichi Tokunaga
Music by	Face 2 Fake
Studio	Warner Bros. Japan
Released	December 13, 2024
Manga
Cells at Work!: Dental
Written by	Koma Warita
Illustrated by	Kawede Sakaki
Published by	Kodansha
Magazine	Monthly Shōnen Sirius
Original run	October 26, 2026 – present
Other
Cells at Work! Code Black (2018–2021)
- icon

Cells at Work! (Japanese: はたらく細胞, Hepburn: Hataraku Saibō) is a Japanese manga series written and illustrated by Akane Shimizu. It features the anthropomorphized cells of a human body, with the two main protagonists being a red blood cell and a white blood cell she frequently encounters. It was serialized in Kodansha's shōnen manga magazine Monthly Shōnen Sirius from January 2015 to January 2021. It is licensed in North America by Kodansha USA.

The series has been adapted into an anime television series by David Production, with two seasons broadcast from July 2018 to February 2021, totaling 21 episodes. A theatrical anime titled "Hataraku Saibō!!" Saikyō no Teki, Futatabi. Karada no Naka wa "Chō" Ōsawagi! premiered in September 2020. The series has also spawned several spin-off manga series, including Cells at Work! Code Black, published from 2018 to 2021 and adapted into an anime television series.

== Plot ==
The story takes place inside the body of an adult human, where trillions of anthropomorphic cells each do their job to keep the body healthy. The series largely focuses on two such cells; a rookie red blood cell, AE3803, who often gets lost during deliveries, and a relentless white blood cell, U-1146, who fights against any germs that invade the body.

== Characters ==
Erythrocyte / Red Blood Cell (AE3803) (赤血球, Sekkekkyū)
Voiced by: Kana Hanazawa (Japanese); Cherami Leigh (English)
Portrayed by: Mei Nagano
A red blood cell who has just started her job, delivering oxygen, carbon dioxide and different nutrients all over the body. She meets Neutrophil when he saves her from an attacking pneumococcus bacterium. She is clumsy and gets lost often, but is determined to perform to the best of her ability. It is later revealed that she had encountered Neutrophil when they were younger, after he saved her from a bacterium.
Neutrophil (好中球, Kōchūkyū) / White Blood Cell (U-1146) (白血球, Hakkekkyū)
Voiced by: Tomoaki Maeno (Japanese); Billy Kametz (English)
Portrayed by: Takeru Satoh
A type of white blood cell, whose job is to kill pathogens infecting the body. Despite his violent and ruthless occupation, he is quite soft-spoken and gentle. When he was still in school as a young cell, he saved AE3803 from a bacterium after she got lost in a training exercise.
Killer T Cell (キラーT細胞, Kirā Tī Saibō)
Voiced by: Daisuke Ono (Japanese); Robbie Daymond (English)
Portrayed by: Koji Yamamoto
A type of white blood cell that recognizes and kills various foreign matter and unhealthy cells. He is aggressive, cocky and rowdy, brutally taking pleasure in slaughtering pathogens and unhealthy cells. He especially looks down on white blood cells forming relationships with non-white blood cells, like Neutrophil's close friendship with Red Blood Cell. He is the sergeant of the Killer T Cells and is a harsh teacher to his students, the Naive T Cells. He has negative relationships with Helper T Cell and NK Cell, the former being his superior in the Killer T Division. In his youth, he was considered to be weak like the rest of the young T Cells, being only able to survive and complete training through the help of Helper T Cell, which at least made him stronger.
Macrophage (マクロファージ, Makurofāji) / Monocyte (単球, Tankyū)
Voiced by: Kikuko Inoue (Japanese); Laura Post (English)
Portrayed by: Wakana Matsumoto
A type of white blood cell. She and her kind appear as lovely maids in big dresses, armed with a variety of large weapons to fight various invasive pathogens, and are often shown smiling cheerfully even in the middle of combat. While inside blood vessels, she and her kind take on the role of monocytes, and wear hazmat suits over their dresses.
Platelet (血小板, Kesshōban)
Voiced by: Maria Naganawa (Japanese); Xanthe Huynh (English)
Portrayed by: Maika Pugh
A type of cell responsible for reconstructing the body after various injuries. They are depicted as children, due to their small cell size, and act as construction and repair crew within the body. One platelet who carries a whistle on her neck serves as their leader and she is most prominently featured in the show, while a secondary yet shy platelet known as "Backward Cap" because she wears her cap backwards, also appears in the story.
Helper T Cell (ヘルパーT細胞, Herupā Tī Saibō)
Voiced by: Takahiro Sakurai (Japanese); Ray Chase (English)
Portrayed by: Shota Sometani
A type of T Cell that determines strategy and courses of action for dealing with foreign invaders. He is the main commander of the Killer T Division and has an intellectual and smooth disposition, putting him at big odds with the rough and tough Killer T Cell, despite having undergone T Cell training together with him.
Regulatory T Cell (制御性T細胞, Seigyosei Tī Saibō)
Voiced by: Saori Hayami (Japanese); Erica Mendez (English)
A type of T Cell that mediates and regulates the correct function and magnitude of immunological responses. She usually acts as Helper T Cell's secretary, though she is capable of fighting when necessary. She went through T Cell training alongside Killer T Cell and Helper T Cell.
Naive T Cell (ナイーブT細胞, Naību T Saibō)
Voiced by: Mutsumi Tamura (Japanese); Laura Stahl (English)
A rookie T Cell who is too frightened to fight invasive microorganisms, until Dendritic Cell helps him transform into Effector T Cell. He and his kind are the students of Killer T Cell, from whom they receive harsh treatment and austere training.
Effector T Cell (エフェクターT細胞, Efekutā T Saibō)
Voiced by: Kenji Nomura (Japanese); Chris Tergliaferra (English)
A Naive T Cell transformed into a large, muscular and powerful T Cell.
Eosinophil (好酸球, Kōsankyū)
Voiced by: M.A.O (Japanese); Kayli Mills (English)
A type of white blood cell who is acquainted with White Blood Cell since they grew up in the same bone marrow. She feels inferior to the other immune cells because of her inability to fight off bacteria and viruses, but she shows her true worth by killing a parasitic Anisakis when the other cells could not. She handles a bident as her weapon of choice.
Dendritic Cell (樹状細胞, Jujō Saibō)
Voiced by: Nobuhiko Okamoto (Japanese); Griffin Burns (English)
Depicted as a messenger dressed in green stationed inside a call center resembling a tree. He can stimulate Naive T Cells and transform them into Effector T Cells. He owns a camera which he always uses to take pictures of events he deems important and stores them in picture albums, some of which are sources of shame and humiliation for the other cells.
Memory Cell (記憶細胞, Kioku Saibō)
Voiced by: Yuichi Nakamura (Japanese); David Vincent (English)
A paranoid and neurotic cell whose job is to remember past infections and allergies so that the immunity system can be ready for them. However, he is scatterbrained and it is difficult for him to sort out his memories, often panicking and screaming whenever disaster strikes.
Mast Cell (マスト細胞, Masuto Saibō)
Voiced by: Ayako Kawasumi (Japanese); Maureen Price (English)
A cell whose job is to monitor and release histamines in response to allergic and inflammatory reactions. She always follows the instructions in her book no matter the situations and is unpopular due to her lack of consideration of what her actions do to the other cells. Also known as "Fat Cell", she gets irked whenever she is referred to with that name.
Senior Red Blood Cell (AA5100) (先輩赤血球, Senpai Sekkekkyū)
Voiced by: Aya Endō (Japanese); Kira Buckland (English)
An older red blood cell who sometimes guides and teaches AE3803 on how to properly perform her occupation.
Junior Red Blood Cell (NT4201) (後輩赤血球, Kōhai Sekkekkyū)
Voiced by: Yui Ishikawa (Japanese); Jeannie Tirado (English)
A young but overly serious red blood cell who becomes AE3803's student.
B Cell (B細胞, Bī Saibō)
Voiced by: Shōya Chiba (Japanese); Erik Scott Kimerer (English)
A white blood cell who carries a weapon that shoots antibodies. He is often annoyed and jealous about not receiving as much credit as the Killer T Cells do. He also has an antagonistic relationship with Mast Cell, as their combined functions only cause grave disasters for the other cells.
Basophil (好塩基球, Kōenkikyū)
Voiced by: Tomokazu Sugita (Japanese); D. C. Douglas (English)
A mysterious and poetic character whose real occupation is unknown, appearing during a food-borne infection to make cryptic commentaries on the disastrous events unfolding.
NK Cell (NK細胞, NK Saibō)
Voiced by: Toa Yukinari (Japanese); Morgan Berry (English)
Portrayed by: Riisa Naka
She patrols the whole body for viruses, bacteria and abnormal cells, with her weapon of choice being a machete. She has a smug demeanor, is somewhat condescending towards other cells and her relationship with Killer T Cell is akin to that of an intense sibling rivalry.
Cancer Cell (がん細胞, Gan Saibō)
Voiced by: Akira Ishida (Japanese); Khoi Dao (English)
Portrayed by: Fukase
An antagonistic cell bent on creating a world where cells no longer have to kill each other, even if it means risking the life of the body.
Normal Cell / Cell Boy (正常細胞, Seijō Saibō)
Voiced by: Yūsuke Kobayashi (Japanese); Bryce Papenbrook (English)
Normal Cell is a minor character who plays a major role in season 2. Normal Cell is a soft-hearted troublemaker. He finds his job of copying himself boring hence he began to venture outside of his apartment to explore or mess around. Despite not being able to do anything, he has a strong will to protect someone that is precious to him (Lactic Acid Bacteria). According to AE3803, he lives by the pharynx, which happens to be an area that contains lymph nodes.

== Media ==
=== Manga ===
Written and illustrated by Akane Shimizu, Cells at Work! was serialized in Kodansha's shōnen manga magazine Monthly Shōnen Sirius from January 26, 2015, to January 26, 2021. Kodansha collected its chapters in six tankōbon volumes, released from July 9, 2015, to February 9, 2021.

Kodansha USA announced that it had licensed Cells at Work! in North America on March 21, 2016.

==== Spin-offs ====
The series has spawned several spin-offs published across various Kodansha's manga magazines and digital platforms:

- Cells at Work!: Bacteria! (はたらく細菌) by Haruyuki Yoshida. The series follows the lives of good and bad bacteria in the intestines. It was serialized in the shōjo manga magazine Nakayoshi from April 3, 2017, to July 3, 2020. It was followed by Cells at Work! Neo Bacteria (はたらく細菌Neo), serialized in Nakayoshi and on the Palcy manga app from December 28, 2020, to February 22, 2021, with a single volume released on the latter date.
- Cells NOT at Work! (はたらかない細胞) by Moe Sugimoto. It follows immature red blood cells (erythroblasts) that do not want to work. It was serialized in Monthly Shōnen Sirius from July 26, 2017, to November 26, 2021.
- Cells at Work! Code Black (はたらく細胞BLACK), written by Shigemitsu Harada and illustrated by Issei Hatsuyoshi. It is set in a "black" environment of a human body suffering an unhealthy lifestyle. It was serialized in the seinen manga magazine Morning from June 7, 2018, to January 21, 2021.
- Cells at Work and Friends! (はたらく細胞フレンド), written by Kanna Kurono and illustrated by Mio Izumi. It centers around a Killer T Cell who is normally strict with himself and others, but wants to have fun during his free time. He also wants to make friends but does not want to ruin his reputation. It was serialized in the shōjo manga magazine Bessatsu Friend from January 12, 2019, to April 13, 2021.
- Cells at Work!: Platelets! (はたらく血小板ちゃん, Platelets at Work), written by Yūko Kakihara and illustrated by Yasu. It focuses on platelet characters. It was serialized in Monthly Shōnen Sirius from May 25, 2019, to April 26, 2021.
- Cells at Work!: Baby! (はたらく細胞BABY) by Yasuhiro Fukuda. It follows a group of cells inside a baby's body, 40 weeks after conception and close to delivery, with the cells unaware of anything. It was serialized in Morning from October 17, 2019, to October 7, 2021.
- Cells at Work!: Lady! (はたらく細胞LADY), written by Harada and illustrated by Akari Otokawa. It is focused on cells in the body of an adult woman. It started in Morning Two on January 22, 2020. The magazine ceased print publication and moved to a digital starting on August 4, 2022. The series finished on September 26, 2022.
- Cells at Work!: White Brigade (はたらく細胞WHITE) by Tetsuji Kanie. It is focused on white blood cells. It was serialized in Monthly Shōnen Sirius from October 26, 2020, to July 26, 2022.
- Cells at Work!: Illegal (はたらく細胞イリーガル) by Kae Hashimoto. It is focused on the cells of a person taking illegal substances. It was serialized on the YanMaga Web digital manga platform from February 1, 2022, to July 18, 2023.
- Cells at Work! Muscle (はたらく細胞マッスル) by Yū Maeda. It is focused on muscles in the human body. It started on the Morning Two manga website from February 16, 2023, to February 20, 2025.
- Cells at Work! Cat (はたらく細胞 猫), written by Choco Aozora and illustrated by Meku Kaire. It is centered around cells in the body of a cat. It was serialized in Monthly Shōnen Sirius from May 25, 2023, to March 26, 2026.
- Cells at Work!: Medicine (はたらく細胞 おくすり), written by Koma Warita and illustrated by Ryō Kuji. It is centered around medicine. It was serialized in Monthly Shōnen Sirius from May 25, 2023, to May 26, 2025.
- Cells at Work!: Dental (はたらく細胞 デンタル), written by Koma Warita and illustrated by Kawede Sakaki. It is set inside of the mouth. It started in Monthly Shōnen Sirius on October 26, 2026.

Kodansha USA has licensed Cells at Work!: Bacteria!, Cells NOT at Work!, Cells at Work! Code Black, Cells at Work and Friends!, Cells at Work!: Platelets!, Cells at Work!: Baby!, Cells at Work!: Lady!, Cells at Work! Neo Bacteria, Cells at Work! White Brigade, and Cells at Work! Cat.

=== Anime ===
An anime television series adaptation was announced in January 2018. It is directed by Kenichi Suzuki and animated by David Production, with scripts written by Suzuki and Yūko Kakihara, and character designs by Takahiko Yoshida. The series' music is composed by Kenichiro Suehiro and Mayuko. The anime series premiered on July 8, 2018, on Tokyo MX and other channels. The series ran for 13 episodes. Aniplex of America licensed the series in North America and simulcast it on Crunchyroll. Madman Entertainment simulcasted Australia and New Zealand on AnimeLab, while Muse Communication licensed the series in Southeast Asia and South Asia, and simulcasted it on Animax Asia. MVM Entertainment acquired the series for distribution in the United Kingdom and Ireland. The opening theme is "Mission! Health Comes First" (ミッション！ 健・康・第・イチ, Mission! Ken - Kō - Dai - Ichi) by Red Blood Cell (Kana Hanazawa / Cherami Leigh), White Blood Cell (Tomoaki Maeno / Billy Kametz), Killer T Cell (Daisuke Ono / Robbie Daymond), and Macrophage (Kikuko Inoue / Laura Post), while the ending theme is "CheerS" by ClariS. A special episode premiered on December 27, 2018. Aniplex of America released the English dub on August 27, 2019.

On March 23, 2019, the series' official Twitter account announced that it would receive a second season. The second season aired from January 9 to February 27, 2021. The main staff at David Production is returning for producing the second season, with the exception of director Kenichi Suzuki being replaced by director Hirofumi Ogura. The opening theme is "Go! Go! Saibō Festa!" by the main cast members, while the ending theme is "Fight!!" by ClariS.

A theatrical anime titled "Hataraku Saibō!!" Saikyō no Teki, Futatabi. Karada no Naka wa "Chō" Ōsawagi! was announced on July 4, 2020, as an advanced screening of episodes 4–8 later aired in the second season. Also shown with a short animation "Kesshouban: Eigakan e Iku". The main staff at David Production returned for producing the film, with the exception of director Kenichi Suzuki being replaced by director Hirofumi Ogura. It premiered on September 5, 2020.

=== Light novel ===
A light novel adaptation of the manga titled as Shōsetsu Hataraku Saibō (小説 はたらく細胞) was published on July 12, 2018, by Kodansha. It is written by Yui Tokiumi and illustrated by Akane Shimizu and has three volumes.

=== Stage play ===
A stage play adaptation titled Tainai Katsugeki Hataraku Saibō (体内活劇「はたらく細胞」) was announced in the August issue of Kodansha's Monthly Shōnen Sirius magazine. The play was held at Tokyo's Theatre 1010 from November 16 to 25, 2018. The play which was directed by Tsuyoshi Kida, starred Masanari Wada as U-1146 and Kanon Nanaki as AE3803, while Keita Kawajiri wrote the script for the play. The last performance was also distributed live.

=== Mobile app ===
A tower-defense game for iOS and Android mobile devices titled Always Cells at Work (いつでも はたらく細胞, Itsudemo Hataraku Saibō) was announced in November 2018. The game service shut down on January 31, 2020.

=== Live-action film ===
A live-action film adaptation was announced by Kodansha and Flag Pictures on March 20, 2023. It was directed by Hideki Takeuchi and the script written by Yuichi Tokunaga, starring Mei Nagano and Takeru Satoh as AE3803 and U-1146, respectively. The film was released on December 13, 2024, by Warner Bros. Pictures.

== Reception ==
Rebecca Silverman of Anime News Network highlighted the educational aspect of the manga despite flaws in presentation of information, and ultimately found the manga entertaining with likable characters. Sean Gaffney of A Case Suitable for Treatment called it a "very fun shonen action manga", complimenting the manga's ridiculousness and humor. Ian Wolf of Anime UK News gave the British Blu-ray release of the anime a score of 9 out of 10, and described the show as the most bloody on television, because so many of the characters are blood cells and thus means it contains more blood than shows depicting much violence.

The 2016 Kono Manga ga Sugoi! guidebook listed the manga as the seventh top manga for male readers. Paul Gravett included the manga in his list of "Top 22 Comics, Graphic Novels & Manga" for October 2016. By July 2017, the manga had over 1.3 million copies in print; it had over 1.5 million copies in print by January 2018.

Dr. Satoru Otsuka, postdoctoral fellow in the molecular neuro-oncology department of Emory University School of Medicine in Atlanta, Georgia, praised the series' depiction of cancer cells during the series' seventh episode. Biology teachers at a high school affiliated with China's Southwest University were so impressed with the accuracy of the series that they assigned it as homework for their students.

The Encyclopedia of Science Fiction described Cells at Work! as an enjoyable and educational anime, praising its combination of charm, absurdity, humor and violence with biological instruction, although it found the series occasionally repetitive. It noted that the show had been praised for its biological accuracy, with educational information incorporated through brief explanatory text and through pathogens explaining their behavior in the manner of supervillains. The encyclopedia also highlighted the series' central conceit of representing the human body as a modern city whose anthropomorphized cells perform specialized roles, while the cells themselves remain unaware of the world outside the body and consequently interpret medical treatments as unexpected external interventions.

== See also ==
- Osmosis Jones, a 2001 American live-action/animated action comedy film and its spin-off television series, Ozzy & Drix, both of which feature a similar premise
- Once Upon a Time... Life, a 1987 French animated series with a similar premise
