= Gregory Horror Show (board game) =

Board game published by Upper Deck Entertainment

Gregory Horror Show is a board game published by Upper Deck Entertainment in 2002.

== Gameplay ==
Gregory Horror Show is a customizable game based on the Japanese animated horror TV program Gregory Horror Show.

== Reviews ==
- Pyramid
- Scrye #52
