= Gregory Horror Show =

Japanese television series

- Genre: Horror-comedy
- Anime television series
- Directed by: Kazumi Minagawa
- Produced by: Yukio Kusumoto
- Written by: Naomi Iwata
- Studio: Milky Cartoon
- Licensed by: NA: Geneon
- Original network: TV Asahi (Note: The series was only broadcast on JOEX-TV, EAT, YAB, and HTB.)
- Original run: October 1, 1999 – June 30, 2001
- Episodes: 88 (+ 3 specials)

Gregory Horror Show (stylized in all caps) is a Japanese CGI anime interstitial television series created by Naomi Iwata and broadcast on select TV Asahi stations between October 1, 1999, and June 30, 2001. The series revolves around the mysterious hotel named Gregory House, where lost souls often end up, run by an old mouse named Gregory. The series is noted for its unusual papercraft-themed art style (similar to the one used in Pecola) and surreal tone.

== Synopsis ==
The first series, "The Nightmare Begins", is a set of 25 stories about a businessman arriving at the hotel after taking a train home from work. He encounters the mysterious owner of the hotel, an old mouse known as Gregory, who suggests that he stay awhile in Room 205. With the help of various guests residing in the hotel, Gregory gradually erodes away his individuality, denouncing the first guest as nothing more than a small part of himself and confronting him on his workaholism. The man soon becomes drawn into a bizarre series of events taking place within Gregory House as he tries desperately to escape from this purgatory. Though he escapes back to his wife and son, he finds reality too boring, and returns voluntarily. It is heavily implied that he becomes an empty shell, Haniwa Salaryman.

The second series, "The Second Guest", is similarly set with 25 stories, except this time the main victim is a woman who has just taken a taxi home from her best friend's wedding ceremony. She has had to endure many failed relationships and careers. It is also implied that her old flame was once the first guest, but their relationship went disastrously wrong. Due to her insanity from the degrading events, she starts a fire, burning down the house - however, the Gregory family survive, and welcome her into their family.

The third series, "The Last Train", is set with 26 stories during a bizarre train ride that Gregory embarks upon. It differs from the previous two series in that there is no guest, nor is the hotel the central setting. Instead, Gregory himself is the protagonist, and the series takes place on the previously mentioned train as Gregory tries to escape from his own home and role as the innkeeper. However, unlike the previous two protagonists, he fails, and the train only takes him back to Gregory House.

The fourth series, "The Bloody Karte", is a set of 12 stories about Catherine working in a mysterious hospital.

== Characters ==
Gregory (グレゴリー, Guregorī)
Voiced by: Chafurin (Japanese); Dave Pettitt (English)
Gregory is the Innkeeper of the hotel and also the narrator, a slightly creepy old anthropomorphic rat with an obsession for keeping guests at his hotel. He loves to mess with one's mind and has a habit of appearing out of nowhere. It's strongly implied that Gregory is a manifestation of the hidden dreams and desires that people suppress, and his hotel the same. Although how several different people can manifest the exact same apparition is unknown, and it's highly probable that Gregory is in fact a spirit of dreams and desires, instead of a single person's manifestation. Gregory's aims seem unclear in both the game and the series, but he seems to be subservient to his mother, who is thoroughly and unambiguously wicked, unlike Gregory, consuming wayward souls to remain young. Gregory himself is more morally ambiguous, since he never overtly harms the guest, though he never makes any attempt to prevent harm coming to them. This may be because everyone in the hotel is effectively immortal, however. While enigmatic, he is, if nothing else, polite and sincere. To the unseen guest of the first series, he always refers to him as "My friend" and, to female guest of the second series, as "My dear". One thing is clear though, Gregory is indestructible and inescapable. Even if the guest tries to flee the purgatory of his hotel, or attempt to destroy him, they'll still somehow return, and Gregory will still be there, keeping their room ready for them. In the third series, Gregory is more unambiguously sympathetic, trying to escape from his role as the keeper of Gregory House and enduring as many strange and bizarre events as either of the previous protagonists. Like them, he ultimately fails to escape, suggesting that even he is a prisoner in his strange world despite his ostensible mastery and ownership of it. In the game, a player can overhear him talking about how they would not be in any danger if they simply accepted the purgatory of Gregory House, but several times in both the series and the game, Gregory is seen to be an antagonistic force, putting his guests, and even himself, quite literally through hell.
In the exclusive Gregory Gallery Tour series, Gregory seems to have vast knowledge about the guests in the hotel, as he gives a tour to an unseen audience. He also seems to have the ability to impersonate each of their personalities and certain parts of their appearances. As is typical for a man his age, Gregory also has a secret, although it's not a secret among the other residents of the hotel - a liking for dirty magazines. He often reads them when he thinks he is alone; in the game, his secret place for reading the magazines is the storeroom.
James (ジェームス, Jēmusu)
Voiced by: Erina Yamazaki (Japanese); Brett Bauer (English)
He is Gregory's grandson, a mischievous young mouse who loves to play pranks on anyone he can find. He drives Gregory to despair and distraction. In the videogame, he is the one who allowed the guests to steal bottled souls from Gregory's Mama. He hates being alone, so he hopes the wandering guest in the game will stay forever so that they can get into all kinds of trouble together.
Neko Zombie (ネコゾンビ, Neko Zonbi)
Voiced by: Nao Nagasawa (Japanese); Onalea Gilbertson (English)
He is a zombie cat who once lived with a family that stayed in Gregory's Hotel. Once a glossy beautiful cat, he escaped from a normal world and ended up at the hotel where Gregory stitched up its eyes, mouth, and ears as act of revenge, possibly against cats in general due to their inter-species conflict. His room is nothing more than a prison cell, revealing the true nature of this strange place.
He is the character who seems the most supportive of the protagonist in both the game and the series, as he is constantly giving them hints on how to battle their inner demons. More than anything, Neko wants the guest to escape this hell-like place. He also attempts to kill Gregory and his mother during the Great Fire of Gregory House (during the series, this fire is caused by him). He ends up turning to ash, when Gregory House is burned down, however the attempt failed when Gregory's sister reincarnated the hotel along with the other guests being resurrected. Neko Zombie however is killed off and never to be seen again.
He is a manifestation of a broken heart, stitched together by anger and misery.
Catherine (キャサリン, Kyasarin)
Voiced by: Ayana Inoue (Japanese, TV series), Minako Ichiki (Japanese, Bloody Karte); Elinor Holt (English)
She is a pink lizard nurse with a giant syringe. She has an obsessive desire to steal blood from guests, and searches for any excuse she can find to do so. One suck of her syringe appears to drain almost all of a person's blood. She easily falls in love with people with nice veins, but she is also shown to take blood for no reason other than personal pleasure, suggesting that it may be fetishistic in nature. She has had relationships with many characters throughout the house, although all of them have ended badly - usually for the other person.
Judgment Boy (審判小僧, Shinpan Kozō)
Voiced by: Naochika Hayashida (Japanese); Brendan Hunter (English)
A set of anthropomorphic scales balanced between love and money. He passes judgment on all of the troubled souls of the hotel, and can see through anyone's lies. His skills at determining the truth are slightly questionable. When he's not judging others, he usually sings to himself about himself ("Do you know who I am? They call me Judgement Boy!").
Judgment Boy Gold (審判小僧ゴールド, Shinpan Kozō Gōrudo)
Voiced by: Naochika Hayashida (Japanese); Steve Olson (English)
He is a solid gold Judgment boy and the boss of all other judgment boys. In the game, he trains all the other judgment boys for the final judgment and is the last guest to visit the hotel. In Bloody Karte, it is revealed that he isn't really gold; he's just gold-plated.
Hell's Chef (地獄のシェフ, Jigoku no Shefu)
Voiced by: Ryuzaburo Otomo (Japanese); Byron Close (English)
He is the chef of Gregory Hotel that looks very much like a dark-faced candle with glowing red eyes and a giant knife that is said to cleave elephant bones like butter. He often butchers/poisons the guests that don't eat or refuse his meals (even if they are just not hungry), and then serves them to other guests. He speaks with a dark, sinister, evil voice.
He is apparently very particular and passionate about his food preparation, and refuses to eat anyone's cooking but his own. He hates smokers/smoking because "They are the enemy of cuisine!" (he hates that it eventually numbs the taste buds). The candle on his head is almost always seen burning because it somewhat acts as his life spark - if it's blown out, he stops moving and his eyes stop glowing, and when it is re-lit, he continues as if nothing had happened.
Lost Doll (ロストドール, Rosuto Dōru)
Voiced by: Naoko Matsui (Japanese); Angie Beers (English)
She is a poor girl looking forever for her doll. At first, she looks harmless but when approached or picked up, she becomes violent and turns blue. She herself is in fact the doll she is looking for. She has a good friendship with Cactus Gunman. Her name may have once been 'Katie'. Her only friend was a doll which was her constant companion, but one day, her parents decided to dispose of the doll. The girl searched endlessly for her lost doll, until she happened upon the place known as Gregory House, where she became a permanent resident.
Mummy Papa (ミイラパパ, Mīra Papa)
Voiced by: Hitoshi Takagi (Japanese); Jonathan Love (English)
He is a father dog with bandaged body and his skull partly cloven by a saber which does not affect him at all apart from a headache. He is a proud hypochondriac with a loving son.
Mummy Dog (ミイラ坊や, Mīra Bōya; Mummy Boy)
Voiced by: Natsumi Sakuma (Japanese); Sean Broadhurst (English)
He is Mummy Papa's son, a smaller dog in dungarees and bandages with his skull partly cloven by an axe. He is also a proud hypochondriac like his father. As he suffers from constant migraines, Mummy Dog is very empathetic to those who look or feel poorly, by getting them help. Unfortunately, that medical attention usually comes in the form of Catherine.
Cactus Gunman (カクタスガンマン, Kakutasu Ganman)
Voiced by: Yoshiyuki Kono (Japanese); Roger Rhodes (English)
He is a cactus in bandit clothes and sombrero who loves to challenge guests into fights. He was once a leader of revolutionaries and is infamous for his terrible aim. He is also quite the macho man, playing tough while any real danger would easily scare him away. In the Video games, depending on the gender selected, he acts differently, hurting the player with a gunshot, if a guy or a bouquet of roses, if a girl.
Cactus Girl (カクタスガール, Kakutasu Gāru)
Voiced by: Mikako Sato (Japanese); Carol-Anne Day (English)
She is Cactus Gunman's younger sister. She is fiercer than her brother and uses a lasso to steal other's clothes, confident of their lack of fashion sense.
Roulette Boy (ルーレット小僧, Rūretto Kozō)
Voiced by: Yoko Asada (Japanese); Mariette Sluyter (English)
He is a small red-faced child with a roulette wheel on his head. He loves to play games and challenges guests to test their luck, usually ending in terrible mishaps and accidents for the players. For this reason, Gregory absolutely hates Roulette Boy as he's always haplessly landing on unlucky squares.
Death (死神, Shinigami)
Voiced by: Masashi Hirose (Japanese); Mike Shepherd (English)
He is the God of Death who visits guests in their dreams with his scythe. He seems to be manic-depressive, considering the fact that in the anime he speaks darkly with a grim voice, while in the game he has a funky and cheery presence. He wears a Swedish flag on his head in reference to the Ingmar Bergman movie The Seventh Seal. Death personally intervenes with the first guest, enabling him to evade Gregory, but forewarns that he may never truly escape for reality is no paradise, but a dull monotonous cycle.
TV Fish (TVフィッシュ, Terebui Fisshu)
It is a skeletal floating fish able to swim in the air and through walls. It has a TV for a face and projects the memories of any guests nearby passively. However, because all guests at Gregory Hotel are uncertain of themselves, the TV shows distorted images. In the anime, there are multiple TV Fish, including one with a Gregory TV satellite.
Frog Fortune-Teller (カエル占い師, Kaeru uranaishi)
Voiced by: Katsumi Suzuki (Japanese); Meredith Taylor-Parry (English)
She is a green frog residing in the hotel. . She appears before people from a white mist, telling people of their fortunes, never seen without her booth or crystal ball. All of her fortunes come true, but how long it takes before it does can very greatly.
Clock Master (クロックマスター, Kurokku Masutā)
Voiced by: Jin Yamanoi (Japanese); Jonathan Love (English)
He is a man with the face of a clock residing in the hotel. He has the ability to control time, although he has grown old and can't travel that far in time anymore. He usually drinks his problems away. He's a very civil and jolly fellow. However, if he catches anyone he even remotely suspects of picking on his child, My Son, he flies into a fit of time-warping rage.
My Son (マイサン, Mai San)
Voiced by: Maiko Ito (Japanese); Mike Thiessen (English)
He is the son of Clock Master, who is currently learning the art of time control. He greatly admires his father.
Dead Body (干からびた死体, Hikarabita Shitai)
Voiced by: (Japanese); Roger Rhodes (English)
He is a skeleton character that resides under the cemetery in front of Gregory Hotel. "Drinks his cares away" with wine until he can find a body to replace his own fragile form. He is weak to wind and water because his powdery bones can easily blow away or melt in the rain.
Angel Dog (エンジェルドッグ, Enjeru Doggu) / Devil Dog (デビルドッグ, Debiru Doggu)
Voiced by: Rei Sakuma (Japanese); Chris Simms (English)
She is a canine with an angelic appearance that invites you to be near her. She has somewhat of a split personality, however, and frequently changes into the Devil Dog and invites you to hell. Gregory, being the embodiment of eternal Purgatory, has a negative relationship with her, as she is the manifestation of Heaven and Hell. She acts like a teenager, arguing with Gregory about how he is always cleaning when she wants to watch football.

== Release ==
The first season, known in Japanese as "The First Guest" and "The Nightmare Begins" in English, ran for 25-episodes on select TV Asahi stations between October 1, 1999, and March 31, 2000. The second season, "The Second Guest" or "The Guest from Hell", aired for 25-episodes between April 1 and September 30, 2000. The third season, "The Last Train" or "The Nightmare Train", ran for 26-episodes between October 7, 2000, and March 31, 2001. The spinoff, "The Bloody Karte" aired for 12-episodes between April 7 and June 30, 2001.

In Japan, NEC Interchannel published the initial two seasons on DVD and VHS across six releases between March 3 and November 22, 2000. The first three volumes included exclusive animated segments known as "Gregory Gallery Tour". VAP would later release all four series (excluding Gregory Gallery Tour) across three DVDs between July 22 and September 22, 2004.

During Anime Boston 2004, Geneon Entertainment announced that it had acquired the series to release in North America. The company commissioned Ocean Productions to produce an English dub, which was recorded at Blue Water Studios. The entire series (excluding Gregory Gallery Tour) was released on DVD across three volumes between September 21, 2004, and January 12, 2005.

== Other media ==
=== Manga ===
In October 2000, Naomi Iwata launched a Gregory Horror Show manga that was serialized in Kodansha's Young Magazine Uppers.

A manga spin-off by Suzuki Sanami, titled Gregory Horror Show: Another World, was serialized in the Weekly Morning magazine starting in the 46th issue of 2007, released on October 18 of that year; it concluded in the magazine's sixth issue of 2008, released on January 10 of that year. Kodansha published the series in a single volume on September 22, 2008.

It follows Tooru Takenozuka, a 22-year-old freeter who comes to the city to follow his dreams. Thanks to his status he is unable to find an apartment to live in until a seedy real estate agent introduces him to Gregory House. He ends up in Room 404 and endures the nightmarish surroundings and residents. Over the course of chapters, it is revealed that Takenozuka's very form and spirit, is in a state of constant flux. He is, in reality, Tooru is a 94-year-old man in the year 2078, though part of him could never accept the fact that he grew beyond his twenties without accomplishing anything extraordinary or wonderful with his life. All of his dreams and ambitions went unfulfilled.

As Gregory is a collector of the rare and unusual, he takes an instant liking to Takenozuka. The man battles between choosing his dreams and the reality that he has responsibilities as a father. Though he manages to escape Gregory, like all the protagonists, he eventually wanders back, becoming a permanent guest who refuses to abandon his dreams.

=== Video games ===
==== G-Mode Mobile Games ====
G-Mode debuted an eponymously titled DoJa adventure game for mobile phones in Japan. It launched on Vodafone on August 18, on EZweb on October 1, and on i-mode on December 1, 2004. It was re-released for Nintendo Switch and Steam as part of the G-Mode Archives series on October 26, 2023. G-Mode also produced Gregory Bakyun, a themed version of their Bakyun series of fortunetelling shooter games. It debuted alongside the other game on Vodafone and EZweb, with the i-mode release on September 1, 2004. A BREW version launched on May 26, 2005, for EZweb.

==== Soul Collector ====
The anime was adapted into a PlayStation 2 game by Capcom Production Studio 3 and published by Capcom on August 7, 2003, in Japan and December 15, 2003, in Europe. The general premise of the game involves the player (who can choose to be male or female) trying to escape from Gregory House, a deranged hotel run by the old mouse Gregory. The game involves having to steal bottled souls from twelve guests, and returning them to Death before going to sleep in Room 101.

In the game, Neko Zombie helps explain the gameplay and introduces the player to mental health. Mental health acts like a health gauge of the player's mental fortitude. The player must maintain a good level of mental health by sleeping, reading books, or using special "herb" items reminiscent of the Resident Evil game series. If the player's mental health completely runs out, then the character goes insane, and becomes a permanent guest at Gregory House.

While the bizarre cube-esque graphics (which were a staple of the 'anime') give the game an unusual look for a survival horror game, there is still an element of tension and unease because the player must creep around the hotel, avoiding detection by the various guests. If the player gets caught by one of them, then the guest will attack them by forcing them to watch some 'Horror Shows', a bizarre vision of violence set in a traditional Japanese theatre in which the guest will inflict severe harm upon you.

The game features a goldmine of Easter eggs and many backstory which either reference or expand upon certain events of the series. For example, in the 'Bloody Karte' arc, Catherine develops an attraction for Hell's Chef; in the game, the player can find a signed trading card of him in the psychotic nurse's treatment room. Also, if a player takes the time to follow the guests around the building at various points in the game, they will often divulge interesting tidbits about the hotel and each other. For example, if the player follows Gregory around early in the game, a huge amount of how Neko Zombie came to be the way he is can be learned.

==== Lost Qualia ====
Milky Cartoon and Unframe, Inc. launched a mobile game based on the show in October 2018 for Android and iOS, titled Gregory Horror Show: Lost Qualia. It has yet to be released outside of Japan.

Gregory Horror Show: Lost Qualia is a Gacha-based RPG mobile game that combines the elements of dungeon crawling with a Gacha card system. Lost Qualia uses the original 3D cube-esque graphics and style that the series is known for.

The main storyline tells of the player showing up at Gregory House, where Gregory the manager himself meets the player and tells him about a previous guest known only as "that man". Gregory further explains that the guests delusional beliefs has gotten far too powerful, and that he is able to take over the hotel, turn it into a dungeon, and distort the surreal world around it. Gregory wants the player to help him and the other guests on a quest to take back Gregory House and defeat the man, who is mad with delusional power. The main quest also takes the player and company outside the hotel to the cactus sibling's homeland, (seen in volume 3) which is called Cactus Land. The quest also takes the player & co. to Roulette boy's casino.

Like the PS2 video game, the player has a hotel room that serves as the central hub when they finish the tutorial or start up the game. They are able to customize their room with items they get either in a quest or in the Gacha cards from the fortune teller, level up their characters, and manage their Gacha cards and deck to use in a quest. Occasionally and randomly, Gregory, Neko Zombie, Catherine, Hell's Chef, and other playable characters will drop by to visit the player in their room talking to them and offer their support in a quest where the player is able to optionally choose them and play as them in any level. If the player has a playable character unlocked from either in a quest or found in Gacha card pack they can engage in conversation with the other visiting characters in the player's room, usually giving their commentary on the player, the current situation, and chat among themselves based on relationships they have with the other characters, or different topics.

The game has the player, Gregory, or other playable characters going through a labyrinth, where they battle through hostile mages and souls that lurk in the dungeons and can appear from anywhere. Using melee attacks, throwable or ranged items, or using Gacha cards to regain health, buff their attacks or speed, special abilities, and using "horror show" Gacha cards to even the odds with one or many hostile souls surrounding them. The objective is for the player to survive and reach the goal to complete the level, sometimes having to climb stairs to the next floor to get there. Optionally, the player can set the game in autoplay (similar to an idle RPG) where the AI takes over for the player on certain parts of the game or just tapping the move button on-screen has the playable character temporarily moving through a corridor and resuming control back to the player when they are in an area with more room. While reaching the goal is important, it also vital for the player to look for Kinko safes around the dungeon for items such as skull gems, soul energy, or gacha cards for the possibility of getting new customize hotel room items or unlocking a character to keep permanently and play as in a quest.

In addition to the main story quest, there are two types of quest offered in the game: event quests that can sometimes be holiday-based events, and special events that are added in the game during updates and have their own storylines. For example, the "Gregory Quest" events tell about the player, Gregory, Neko Zombie, and the other guests getting sucked up by TV fish and entering into a world based on fantasy RPG video games and became RPG characters based on character classes, each with their own quest in each Gregory Quest event. Depending on certain quest events and levels, both will automatically have the player play as specific characters as they have specific quests in the event storyline, or Ranked quests which are competitive survival quests where the player have to fight through hostile souls to reach the highest position of the leaderboard. Depending on the first, second, and third position when a ranking quest ends, the winning player earns a trophy to display in their hotel room.

==== Soul of Roses ====
On May 19, 2023, Iwata and Unframe launched a crowdfunding campaign on Campfire in Japan to produce a new game titled, Gregory Horror Show: Soul of Roses. Intended for Windows, the game is a 2D roguelite. It was successfully funded, raising over 400% of its goal. Iwata launched a crowdfunding campaign on Kickstarter to produce an English translation of the game alongside a new animated pilot on April 11, 2024. It failed to meet its funding goal. A second campaign dedicated exclusively to translating Soul of Roses was launched on June 15. It was successfully funded. The game launched through Steam early access on November 15, 2024.

=== Board game ===
A board game based on Gregory Horror Show was published by Upper Deck Entertainment in 2002.

== Possible revival ==
In 2016, Naomi Iwata's website announced that a new Gregory series was to be produced under the title of Gregory Horror Show: Mystery Holiday by Polygon Pictures. Little is known about it other than a plot synopsis and some redesigns. The series would follow a young boy named Hiroshi, who wanders into Gregory House on a whim hoping it will grant his wishes but has to stop Gregory's evil plan to destroy the world. No release date was announced.

In April 2024, TV Asahi pitched Gregory Horror Show: Save Our Souls to potential partners. It was intended to be a new, full-length 26-episode animated series aimed at 8 to 12-year-olds. Separately that same month, Iwata launched a crowdfunding campaign on Kickstarter for an English translation of the Soul of Roses video game alongside a pilot for a new animated series featuring Hell's Chef, called Gregory Horror Show: Hell's Restaurant. The campaign failed to meet its funding goal.
