= Gregory Horror Show (video game) =

2003 video game

- European box art
- Developer: Capcom Production Studio 3
- Publisher: Capcom
- Director: Eiro Shirahama
- Producers: Tatsuya Minami; Kouji Nakajima
- Designer: Shino Okamura
- Writer: Naomi Iwata
- Composers: Hiroshi Nakajima; Shinichi Hideoka; Hidenori Miyanaga
- Platform: PlayStation 2
- Release: JP: 7 August 2003; EU: 15 December 2003
- Genre: Survival horror
- Mode: Single-player

Gregory Horror Show, known in Japan as Gregory Horror Show: Soul Collector, (Note: Japanese: グレゴリーホラーショー ソウルコレクター, Hepburn: Guregorī Horā Shō Sōru Korekutā) is a survival horror game based on the computer-generated imagery (CGI) anime series of the same name. The game was published by Capcom in Japan and Europe, but was not released in North America.

A screenshot of the game where a player is being chased

== Gameplay ==
Players must navigate the hotel, retrieving the bottled souls which the hotel guests have been carrying. Neko Zombie, a heavily stitched cat who has become imprisoned in his room, introduces players to the control scheme and methods of spying on guests and stealing the souls back. Spying through keyholes allows players to eavesdrop useful information from guests, as well as scout ahead before plunging into a room and coming face-to-face with guests.

Guests will usually flee if they see the player character, while they still possess a bottled soul. Once the player has recovered the soul from that particular guest, instead of fleeing they will chase and attack the player, reclaiming the soul should the player still be holding it. The guests can all run faster than the player's character, making stealth an important aspect of play. It is possible to hide in wardrobes, but this must be achieved while any pursuing guests are out of sight.

As play progresses and souls are collected, more guests check-in the hotel and more hotel rooms and areas become available for exploration. This is in addition to the guests who have already been relieved of their soul bottles - these prowl the corridors of the hotel, looking for the player, making it increasingly difficult to travel from one location to another without being seen.

== Plot ==
The game begins with the protagonist walking through a forest in a deep fog. They are stated to have no memory of how they ended up in the forest. Eventually a bright light appears in the fog coming from a hotel, Gregory House, which serves as the game's main setting. The player character enters the hotel and is greeted by Gregory, the mouse that runs the hotel. He asks the player what their name and gender is, before giving them a room in the hotel.

That night, after the player has fallen asleep, they meet Death in a dream. He tells the player that they have been trapped at Gregory House but that he is willing help them to escape. In return, he wants the player to find 12 lost souls which are kept by residents of Gregory House. Death makes the promise that, once he has received the 12 souls, he will help the player escape Gregory House

The player upon waking hears screaming from the neighbouring room, which is locked. The room's inhabitant, Neko Zombie, asks the player to get the key for the room by stealing it from Gregory. Once the player has done so they can enter the room to talk properly with Neko Zombie. Neko Zombie gives the player an explanation of various aspects of the game and once the tutorial is finished he gives them the game's first lost soul.

After this, the player is prompted to retrieve the souls from each guest as they come into the hotel. As the story progresses Gregory's mother is introduced explaining that she feeds on lost souls to retain her youth.

Once the player has retrieved every soul, Death prepares to fulfill his end of the bargain with the player and help them escape. However, the player declines, wanting to bring Neko Zombie with them to safety rather than abandoning them. Approaching Neko Zombie in their room Neko Zombie declines to leave while urging the player to hurry and escape. The player, before leaving, gives Neko Zombie a red handkerchief to tie over his foot which has been injured by the ball-and-chain used to imprison them.

Entering the lobby will reveal that the door is still locked leading to a boss battle with Gregory's mother. Though she can't be harmed directly the player is given the prompting to get her to break the door to the hotel down. Once this is done, the player is able to flee Gregory House. Gregory takes on a ghostly form and gives chase, but the player manages to escape him.

Back at Gregory House, Neko Zombie burns down the hotel, destroying it and killing everyone inside, notably including himself, Gregory, Gregory's mother and all of the guests.

The game's ending reveals that the hotel was in fact a creation of the player meant to serve as an escape for the struggles of reality. The player character then states that should they ever grow bored with life in reality they will find their way back to the hotel once again. Gregory house is then shown being reconstructed, and Gregory has a room prepared for the player when they return.

== Reception ==
Reception

Aggregate score
Aggregator	Score
Metacritic	75/100

Review scores
Publication	Score
Computer and Video Games	7/10
Edge	8/10
Eurogamer	7/10
Famitsu	32/40
GamesMaster	86%
GamesTM	7/10
Jeuxvideo.com	14/20
PlayStation Official Magazine – UK	8/10
Play	78%
PSM3	70%

The game received "generally favourable reviews" according to the review aggregation website Metacritic. In Japan, Famitsu gave it a score of one nine, one eight, one seven, and one eight for a total of 32 out of 40.

PlayStation 2 Official Magazine – Spain gave it a score of 7.2 out of 10, saying that "The concept of the game is good in principle, although in the end it becomes repetitive." Eurogamer gave it a score of 7 out of 10, rewarding it's curiosity and experimentation compared to other Capcom titles but still acknowledging the small issues present in the game. A good portion of game reviewers admired the game's uniqueness but found the gameplay mechanics became stale after some time. It was also common that reviewers were unsure of what demographic the game was aimed at because of the blocky more cartoonish style and simplistic gameplay.
