= Cells at Work! Code Black =

Japanese manga series

- First volume cover

はたらく細胞BLACK (Hataraku Saibō Burakku)
- Created by: Akane Shimizu
- Manga
- Written by: Shigemitsu Harada
- Illustrated by: Issei Hatsuyoshiya
- Published by: Kodansha
- English publisher: NA: Kodansha USA
- Magazine: Morning
- Original run: June 7, 2018 – January 21, 2021
- Volumes: 8
- Anime television series
- Directed by: Hideyo Yamamoto
- Written by: Hayashi Mori
- Music by: Yugo Kanno
- Studio: Liden Films
- Licensed by: NA: Aniplex of America; SA/SEA: Muse Communication
- Original network: Tokyo MX, GYT, ytv, BS11, MBS, TV Aichi, HBC, RKB
- English network: SEA: Animax Asia
- Original run: January 10, 2021 – March 21, 2021
- Episodes: 13
- Other
- Cells at Work!
- icon

Cells at Work! Code Black (Japanese: はたらく細胞BLACK, Hepburn: Hataraku Saibō Burakku) is a Japanese manga series spin-off to Cells at Work! by Akane Shimizu. The manga was written by Shigemitsu Harada and illustrated by Issei Hatsuyoshiya. It was serialized in Kodansha's seinen manga magazine Morning from June 2018 to January 2021, and was licensed in North America by Kodansha USA. An anime television series adaptation produced by Liden Films aired from January 10 to March 21, 2021.

== Plot ==
In contrast to the main series, which is set in a generally healthy human body, Cells at Work! Code Black is set in a "black" environment of an adult man suffering an unhealthy lifestyle. The story follows the anthropomorphic cells struggling to maintain the body against threats such as smoking, excessive alcohol consumption, and sexually transmitted infections.

== Characters ==
Characters from the series

Erythrocyte / Red Blood Cell (AA2153) (赤血球, Sekkekkyū)
Voiced by: Junya Enoki (Japanese); Kyle McCarley (English)
Portrayed by: Rihito Itagaki
AA2153 is one of the two protagonists. He is a rookie erythrocyte that had started working inside a poorly maintained body, and thus an abusive work environment. As a rookie, AA2153 was initially excited for his task of going to the lungs, only to find LDLs, Carbon Monoxide, and Pneumococcus along the way. He is dedicated to doing his part in helping the body, but is strongly disheartened by the awful work conditions and failure of the body to improve. He develops a friendship with U-1196, a neutrophil who frequently rescues him and serves as a source of encouragement, as well as AC1677, a fellow Red Blood Cell with whom he frequently works side-by-side.
Neutrophil (好中球, Kōchūkyū) / White Blood Cell (U-1196) (白血球, Hakkekkyū)
Voiced by: Yoko Hikasa (Japanese); Allegra Clark (English)
U-1196 is one of the two protagonists. She is a neutrophil in a poorly maintained body, and thus an abusive work environment. She is very set on her mission and never complains about the hardships of her work environment or the poor treatment she receives, but still appreciates support and shows respect to other cells. She is described as a "heroic elder sister" who works hard for the sake of her mission. Though overall a calm and caring cell, she has the tendency to be critical of herself and overwork. She is good friends with two playful but unnamed neutrophil soldiers, and with AA2153.
Erythrocyte / Red Blood Cell (AC1677) (赤血球, Sekkekkyū)
Voiced by: KENN (Japanese); Jon Allen (English)
AC1677 is a rookie erythrocyte and a close friend of AA2153 who is also working inside a poorly maintained body, and thus an abusive work environment. He is a chicken-hearted individual who often tries to escape whenever hardships happen, believing he will be putting himself in danger unnecessarily, but sticks to his work because of AA2153's commitment. He is ultimately very loyal to his friends and eventually sacrifices himself for AA2153 when he was about to fall into the stomach acid.
Neutrophil (好中球, Kōchūkyū) / White Blood Cell (J-1178) (白血球, Hakkekkyū)
J-1178 is highly experienced and somewhat jaded. She loathes her job and views it as pointless given how terrible the body's conditions are, but her sense of integrity pushes her to give her work her all anyway. When she encounters AA2153 after the transfusion, she's initially dismissive of him, but becomes flustered when he calls her "White Blood Cell-chan" due to her diminutive stature. Upon meeting U-1196, J-1178 at first believes her to be a lone wolf who is unsympathetic to how overworked the other neutrophils are, but soon realizes that U-1196 is only trying to be proactive against problems that have the potential to grow into extremely dire threats to the body. She comes to regard U-1196 as a mentor and partner, and calls her "big sister" out of respect. The two band together in what is hailed as "the strongest partnership", and prove to be a formidable duo in battle. After U-1196 is badly injured during the neutrophils' failed attack on the periodontitis bacteria swarm, J-1178 is devastated. She becomes withdrawn and scared of resuming her work, even after U-1196 recovers, but is given a motivational talk by an erythrocyte and then comes to the timely rescue of AA2153 and U-1196, fully recommitted to the job.
Neutrophil (好中球, Kōchūkyū) / White Blood Cell (U-1212) (白血球, Hakkekkyū)
Voiced by: Yumi Uchiyama (Japanese); Tiana Camacho (English)
One of the Neutrophils working in the same poorly maintained body, working alongside U-1196 and U-8787.
Neutrophil (好中球, Kōchūkyū) / White Blood Cell (U-8787) (白血球, Hakkekkyū)
Voiced by: Lynn (Japanese); Lizzie Freeman (English)
Another of the Neutrophils working in the same poorly maintained body, working alongside U-1196 and U-1212.
Hepatocyte (肝細胞, Kan Saibō)
Voiced by: Sarah Emi Bridcutt (Japanese); Lauren Landa (English)
Portrayed by: Kyoko Fukada
Hepatocyte is a cell who mainly functions in the liver. She appears as hostess to serve the Red Blood Cells with ADH, an enzyme that breaks down alcohol and converts it into acetaldehyde.
Gastric chief cell (胃主細胞, I shu Saibō)
Voiced by: Takashi Narumi (Japanese); John E. Bentley (English)
Gastric Chief Cell (or peptic cell, or gastric zymogenic cell) is a cell that works in the stomach. He used to have a tough, but kind-hearted attitude to visiting blood cells, but when the body started to break down, he turned to a harsh, serious, and strict attitude towards other cells.

== Media ==
=== Manga ===
The manga is written by Shigemitsu Harada, with illustrations by Issei Hatsuyoshiya and supervision by Shimizu. It ran in Weekly Morning from June 7, 2018, to January 21, 2021, and collected eight tankōbon volumes.

No.	Original release date	Original ISBN	English release date	English ISBN
1	July 9, 2018	978-4-06-512067-5	September 3, 2019	978-1-63236-894-2
1. "Smoking, Bacteria, and the Beginning of the End" (喫煙、細菌、終わりの始まり, Kitsuen, Saikin, Owari no Hajimari); 2. "The Liver, Alcohol, and Pride" (肝臓、アルコール、誇り, Kanzō, Arukōru, Hokori); 3. "Erection, Ejaculation, and Emptiness" (勃起、射精、虚無, Bokki, Shasei, Kyomu); 4. "Gonococci, an Invasion" (淋菌、襲来, Rinkin, Shūrai); 5. "Overwork, Delirium, and Hair Loss" (過重労働、錯乱、脱毛, Kajū Rōdō, Sakuran, Datsumō)
2	September 21, 2018	978-4-06-512760-5	November 5, 2019	978-1-63236-895-9
6. "Calamity, Athlete's Foot, and the Meaning of Work" (異変、水虫、働く意味, Ihen, Mizumushi, Hataraku Imi); 7. "Stomach Ulcer, Friendship, and Loss" (胃潰瘍、友情、喪失, Ikaiyō, Yūjō, Sōshitsu); 8. "Desperation, Gout, and Rebellion" (自暴自棄、痛風、反乱, Jibōjiki, Tsūfū, Hanran); 9. "Return, the Heart, and Demise" (復帰、心臓、終焉, Fukki, Shinzō, Shūen); 10. "Cardiac Arrest, Revival, and a Change" (心筋梗塞、蘇生、変化, Shinkinkōsoku, Sosei, Henka)
3	February 22, 2019	978-4-06-514640-8	January 21, 2020	978-1-63236-896-6
11. "Peace, Polyp, and Cataclysm" (平和、ポリープ、天変地異, Heiwa, Porīpu, Tenpenchii); 12. "Energy Drinks, Nose Bleeds, and Quotas" (エナジードリンク、鼻血、ノルマ, Enajīdorinku, Hanadji, Noruma); 13. "Kidneys, Kidney Stones, and Passing Blood" (腎臓、尿路結石、血尿, Jinzō, Nyōro Kesseki, Ketsunyō); 14. "Urinary Tract Infection, Silence, Tears" (尿路感染、沈黙、涙, Nyōrokansen, Chinmoku, Namida); 15. "Sebum, Old-People Smell, and a Final Job" (皮脂、加齢臭、最後の仕事, Hishi, Kareishū, Saigo no Shigoto); 16. "Calves, Work Harassment, and a Nightmare Returned" (ふくらはぎ、パワハラ、悪夢再び, Fukurahagi, Pawahara, Akumufutatabi); 17. "Pulmonary Embolism, Quick Thinking, and a Reunion" (肺血栓、機転、再会, Haikessen, Kiten, Saikai)
4	June 21, 2019	978-4-06-516113-5	March 24, 2020	978-1-63236-943-7
18. "Pancreas, Insulin, and Collapse" (膵臓、インスリン、決壊, Suizō, Insurin, Kekkai); 19. "Exhaustion, Glycation, and an Excuse" (疲弊、糖化、言い訳, Hihei, Tōka, Iiwake); 20. "AGA, Semen, and Disappearing Jobs" (AGA、精液、無くなる仕事, Ēga, Seieki, Nakunaru Shigoto); 21. "Return to Work, Responsibility, and Hemorrhoids" (復帰、責任、痔, Fukki, Sekinin, Ji); 22. "Anal Fistula, Fault, and Results" (痔瘻、責任、手柄, Jirō, Sekinin, Tegara); 23. "Shingles, Duty, and Teammates" (帯状疱疹、使命、仲間, Taijōhōshin, Shimei, Nakama); 24. "Sugars, Blood Vessels, and Catastrophe" (糖分、血管、破局, Tōbun, Kekkan, Hakyoku)
5	October 23, 2019	978-4-06-517225-4	August 11, 2020	978-1-64651-034-4
25. ""Inferno, Gangrene, Hard Worker" (炎上、懐疽、働き者, Enjō, Futokoroso, Hatarakimono); 26. "Incineration, Amputation, Merciful Rain"" (却、切断、慈雨, Shōkyaku, Setsudan, Jiu); 27. "Apnea, Sentimentality, Reality" (無呼吸、感傷、現実, Mukokyū, Kanshō, Genjitsu); 28. "Pancreas, Deceit, Inferno" (膵臓、欺瞞、炎上, Suizō, Giman, Enjō); 29. "Periodontitis, Roots, Miscalculation" (歯周病、牙城、誤算, Shishūbyō, Gajō, Gosan); 30. "Sleeping Pills, Alcohol, Requiem" (睡眠薬、アルコール、鎮魂歌(レクイエム), Suimin'yaku, Arukōru, Rekuiemu); Special "Bacteria, Gargling, Unexpected Meeting" (バクテリア、うがい、予期せぬ会議, Bakuteria, u gai, yoki senu kaigi')
6	April 23, 2020	978-4-06-519207-8	October 13, 2020	978-1-64651-149-5
32. "Gastric Lavage, Tears, Tears" (胃洗浄、涙、涙, I senjō, Namida, Namida); 33. "The Brain, Vitality, Atrophy" (脳、活力、萎縮, Nō, Katsuryoku, Ishuku); 34. "Depression, Resolve, No Way Out" (うつ、覚悟、万事休す, Utsu, Kakugo, Banjikyūsu); 35. "Drugs, Quitting Smoking, Fear" (薬、禁煙、恐怖, Kusuri, Kin'en, Kyōfu); 36. "Wandering, Drug Efficacy, Mission" (迷走、薬効、使命, Meisō, Yakkō, Shimei)
7	September 23, 2020	978-4-06-520716-1	May 18, 2021	978-1-64651-150-1
37. "Undefeated, Rejection, Calamity" (無敗、否定、凶変, Muhai, Hitei, Kyōhen); 38. "Atrocity, One Loss, Self-Sacrifice" (無残、一敗、挺身, Muzan, ichi-pai, teishin); 39. "Wrong Way, Excision, Strength" (逆走、切除、強さ, Gyakusō, Setsujo, Tsuyo-sa); 40. "Metastasis, Radiation, Anti-Cancer Drugs" (転移、放射線、抗がん剤, Ten'i, Hōshasen, Kō gan-zai); 41. "Immunotherapy, Existence, Entrustment" (免疫療法、存在、託されたもの, Men'eki ryōhō, Sonzai, Takusa reta mono)
8	February 22, 2021	978-4-06-522343-7	August 30, 2022	978-1-64651-220-1
42. "Renaissance, Future, A Cruel Declaration" (ルネッサンス、未来、残酷な宣言, Runessansu, Mirai, Zankokuna Sengen); 43. "Hemostasis, Trust, Sempai" (止血、信頼、先輩, Shiketsu, Shinrai, Senpai); 44. "Heroes, Learning, Attack" (英雄、学習、攻撃, Eiyū, Gakushū, Kōgeki); 45. "Thugs, Vitality, Beneficial Bacteria" (凶悪犯、活力、有益な細菌, Kyōaku-han, Katsuryoku, Yūekina Saikin); 46. "Difference, Generation, Mutual support" (違い、世代、相互サポート, Chigai, Sedai, Sōgo Sapōto); 47. "Recovery, Peace, Return" (回復、平和、リターン, Kaifuku, Heiwa, Ritān); 48. "Brain Metastasis, Willpower, Work" (脳転移、意志力、仕事, Nō Ten'i, Ishi-ryoku, Shigoto)

=== Anime ===
Key visual for the series

In April 2020, the 20th issue of Morning magazine revealed that an anime adaptation of Cells at Work! Code Black was in production. The series aired from January 10 to March 21, 2021. The series is directed by Hideyo Yamamoto with series composition by Hayashi Mori. Yugo Kanno is composing the music, Eiji Akibo is designing the characters for animation, and Liden Films is producing the series. Aniplex of America licensed the series and streamed it on Funimation starting on January 7, 2021, two days before the Japanese broadcast. Crunchyroll also streamed the series a month later. Muse Communication licensed the series in Southeast Asia and will stream it on iQIYI and Bilibili. The opening theme is "Hashire! with Yamasaki Seiya (Kyūso Nekokami)", while the ending theme is "Ue o Mukaite Hakobō with Sekkekkyū/Hakkekkyū", both performed by Polysics. On March 10, 2021, Funimation and Aniplex of America announced the series would be dubbed by Bang Zoom! Entertainment, with the first episode premiering the next day.

No.	Title	Directed by	Written by	Original release date (Note: Episodes were released every friday at 2:30 a.m. JST on Funimation.)
1	"Smoking, Bacteria, and the Beginning of the End"; Transliteration: "Kitsuen, Saikin, Owari no Hajimari." (Japanese: 喫煙、細菌、終わりの始まり。)	Jun'ichi Kitamura	Hayashi Mori	January 10, 2021
A naive and idealistic rookie red blood cell named AA2153 starts his first day of work and is overwhelmed by the state of the body he works in. The blood vessels are clogged by cholesterol, the red blood cells are not allowed to take breaks, and everybody is grumpy and rude due to the body being under stress. Delivering oxygen with a veteran red blood cell, they face a carbon monoxide cloud and are saved from a group of Pneumococcus bacteria by a white blood cell named U-1196. The weary veteran entrusts AA2153 with the body before committing suicide by running into the carbon monoxide. U-1196 leads AA2153 to the lungs, which are contaminated with tar, and horrifies him when she explains that the body is addicted to smoking cigarettes.
2	"The Liver, Alcohol, and Pride"; Transliteration: "Kanzō, Arukōru, Hokori." (Japanese: 肝臓、アルコール、誇り。)	Hiroshi Kimura	Hayashi Mori	January 17, 2021
AA2153 tries to deliver oxygen to a mouth ulcer that gets invaded by bacteria. He is saved by U-1196 and other white blood cells, then the body gargles to flush the bacteria out. The other white blood cells tease AA2153 for being scrawny when they notice he is attracted to U-1196. Later, the body ingests alcohol, making the red blood cells drunk. An elder red blood cell leads them to the liver, depicted as a Red-light district, where the hepatocytes feed them ADH and then ALDH to detoxify them of Acetaldehyde. Still haunted by his mentor's death, AA2153 angrily rants that the red blood cells work hard and risk their lives every day while the hepatocytes get off easy, but the elder takes him backstage to show him that the hepatocytes are also stressed out and overworked. Shortly afterwards, the elder passes away from old age and is devoured by a Kupffer cell to recycle his nutrients. AA2153 apologizes to his hepatocyte hostess, who forgives and kisses him, embarrassing him when U-1196 catches them together. U-1196 warns them to be careful because the liver is at risk of developing Cirrhosis. The next day, the red blood cells suffer from hangovers, then complain when the body takes Hair of the dog.
3	"Excitement, Swelling, and Emptiness"; Transliteration: "Kōfun, Bōchō, Kyomu." (Japanese: 興奮、膨張、虚無。)	Kazuya Fujishiro	Hayashi Mori	January 19, 2021 (Note: Episode 3 and 4 were released together on January 17, 2021 at 3:40 a.m. JST on Funimation and aired as an hour long special on January 19, 2021 at 1:40 a.m. JST on Tokyo MX.)
Following the body's arousal, AA2153 is summoned to the male reproductive organ's Corpora-Cavernosa to produce an erection. He is bullied by veteran Erythrocytes cutting in line and saved by U-1196. Along with two other Neutrophils they go to the testes, depicted as a nursery for spermatogonia where Sertoli cells take care of them. Later, accumulated stress impairs the erection but there is an intake of Sildenafil (Viagra). Ejaculaton is achieved but intercourse allowed an infection by Gonococci.
4	"Forefront, Gonococci, and Conflict"; Transliteration: "Saizensen, Rinkin, Kattō." (Japanese: 最前線、淋菌、葛藤。)	Kōji Aritomi	Hayashi Mori	January 19, 2021
AA2153 comforts some Platelets terrified by the Gonococci infection. After taking several casualties, the Neutrophils retreat and regroup in a lymph node, but their captain warns that Gonorrhea has no chance of healing naturally. Several cells accuse the Neutrophils of not doing their jobs. Meanwhile AA2153 and a teammate deliver oxygen to the infested area, and find the Neutrophils being overwhelmed and captured by Gonococci. The Gonococci point out that the other cells do not appreciate the Neutrophils and propose that they join forces to destroy the body. When they refuse, the Gonococci are about to kill their captives when AA2153 distracts them with a speech about how he appreciates the Neutrophils. Just then Penicillin is administered orally, weakening the Gonococci's cell walls and allowing them to be defeated. The fallen Neutrophils are disposed of as pus in the urine. Upon reading the battle report, T-Cells blame the Neutrophils for the body's weak state.
5	"Overwork, Hair Loss, and Delirium"; Transliteration: "Kajū Rōdō, Datsumō, Sakuran." (Japanese: 過重労働、脱毛、錯乱。)	Tatsuji Yamazaki	Hayashi Mori	January 24, 2021
Neutrophils took heavy casualties during the Gonococci's infection, so Killer T Cells are overworked. AA2153 delivers oxygen to Hair Matrix cells and bumps into U-1196 exercising despite her injuries. While the two reminisce about the battle between the Neutrophils and the bacteria and she thanks him for saving her life by distracting the Gonococci, she gets berated by passing Killer T Cells who later go haywire and attack the Hair cells after mistaking them for cancer cells, causing the hair to begin falling out. AA2153 organizes the red blood cells to deliver oxygen to the hair cells, hoping to sustain them. Helper T Cell makes things worse by releasing Cytokines to make the Killer T Cells go even more berserk, and things only calm down by administration of Steroids—depicted as battle droids that restrain the T Cells. Afterwards AA2153 questions the point of working hard, while a healed U-1196 overhears cells talking about the incident with the T Cells. Yet another problem arises, this time in the urinary tract.
6	"Kidneys, Kidney Stones, and Tears"; Transliteration: "Jinzō, Nyōro Kesseki, Namida." (Japanese: 腎臓、尿路結石、涙。)	Toshiyuki Sone	Hayashi Mori	January 31, 2021
AA2153 goes to the kidneys to be bathed and finds that the Glomeruli are also overworked and stressed, but their leader, Gran, refuses to let them rest or complain, saying the kidneys are silent organs. The body gets a one-centimeter kidney stone, tearing the ureter and causing several blood cells to get lost in the urine. The body gets a tube inserted through the urethra that breaks the stone, but it also allows bacteria to invade. While the Neutrophils hold them off, AA2153 returns to the kidneys and urges them to evacuate, but Gran refuses to allow them. The Glomeruli start complaining. Gran sacrifices herself to shield one of them from a bacterium before U-1196 is able to kill it. Before she dies, Gran apologizes for pushing them so hard, but their work is vital to the body. The Neutrophils are losing until the body takes antibiotics, so the bacteria are defeated. As the Glomeruli cry over Gran's death, AA2153, who had become very dirty because of the ordeal, chooses to skip a bath and continue delivering oxygen to give them a break and let them grieve.
7	"Caffeine, Temptation, and Jealousy"; Transliteration: "Kafein, Yūwaku, Shitto." (Japanese: カフェイン、誘惑、嫉妬。)	Kiyoshi Murayama	Hayashi Mori	February 7, 2021
Some of the oxygen delivered turns into ROS, damaging the cells and causing them to blame the red blood cells. AA2153 gets an award for delivering the most oxygen out of the rookies, causing one of his friends, AC1677, to become jealous. The two find that the hair has not regrown and deliver oxygen to a dying sebaceous cell, but ROS from AC1677's delivery causes bad body odor. Now extremely resentful of AA2153's successes, AC1677 falls in with the veterans who bullied them and they get him addicted to caffeine and arginine, boosting his energy and allowing him to match AA2153's pace. AA2153 rejects the drugs, pointing out the power boost is temporary, then they will crash. The body suffers a nosebleed. As the blood cells try to resist being sucked outside, AC1677 crashes and runs out of strength. He admits AA2153 was right and resigns himself to die, but AA2153 saves him and says having him for a friend was what motivated him to be successful. Later, the bullies invite AC1677 to partake of the drugs again, but he rejects them, having beaten the addiction.
8	"Calves, Pulmonary Embolism, and Quick Thinking"; Transliteration: "Fukurahagi, Haikessen, Kiten." (Japanese: ふくらはぎ、肺血栓、機転。)	Kazuya Fujishiro	Hayashi Mori	February 14, 2021
The red blood cells return to the liver, but due to the body's excessive drinking, it is run down and the hepatocytes are sickly. They go to the calves and find they are suffering from Deep vein thrombosis. The bullies attempt to murder AA2153 and AC1677 by kicking them into the blood clot, but U-1196 rescues them. The blood clot comes loose and travels through the body, killing the bullies along the way, until it clogs the pulmonary artery. The body starts to suffocate, but AA2153 tells the red blood cells to use the bronchial arteries as an alternate route to the lungs, allowing them to sustain the lungs until the clot dissolves. U-1196 tells AA2153 that he was the hero today. Later, U-1196 goes on patrol and is shocked to find all the other immune cells are missing.
9	"Calamity, Athlete's Foot, and the Meaning of Work"; Transliteration: "Ihen, Mizumushi, Hataraku Imi." (Japanese: 異変、水虫、働く意味。)	Hiroshi Kimura	Hayashi Mori	February 21, 2021
AA2153 discovers the genitals are infected with ringworm and the sperm count is low. U-1196 warns that the white blood cell count is low and AA2153 discovers the red blood cell count is low as well. AA2153 is assigned to be a mentor to some rookie red blood cells, but this causes him to go behind schedule on oxygen deliveries and the cells complain. He and AC1677 go to the feet, but find it has Athlete's foot. U-1196 and her only backup, two other Neutrophils, battle the ringworm, but are overwhelmed until the body treats the infection with Butenafine Hydrochloride. The exhausted immune cells are then ordered to battle ringworm elsewhere. AA2153 becomes obsessed with emulating U-1196's work ethic and works himself to exhaustion with deliveries. AC1677 forces him to stop and rest, pointing out the body continues to function without them.
10	"Stomach Ulcer, Friendship, and Loss"; Transliteration: "Ikaiyō, Yūjō, Sōshitsu." (Japanese: 胃潰瘍、友情、喪失。)	Kōji Aritomi	Hayashi Mori	February 28, 2021
The body gets a stomach ulcer, so the red blood cells are called to supply oxygen and nutrients so it can be repaired. When a few red blood cells are killed by splashes of stomach acid, AC1677 runs away in fear, but eventually comes back. The ulcer is revealed to be caused by H. pylori, so U-1196 and the other Neutrophils battle it. The battle causes tremors and AA2153's leg is injured by a splash of stomach acid. AC1677 pulls him to safety, but falls into the stomach acid himself and dies. AA2153 becomes hysterical and insists his friend is not dead, until a gastric cell slaps some sense into him. The body takes clarithromycin to stop the infection. AA2153 is so depressed that he passes U-1196 without greeting her, then she notices his discarded glasses. AA2153 mopes around his apartment and refuses to work.
11	"Desperation, Gout, and Rebellion"; Transliteration: "Jibōjiki, Tsūfū, Hanran." (Japanese: 自暴自棄、痛風、反乱。)	Jun'ichi Kitamura	Hayashi Mori	March 7, 2021
A huge crystal appears in the big toe. Thinking it is a germ, the immune cells attack it, but cannot damage it and only manage to damage the surroundings and cause inflammation. AA2153 wanders aimlessly and runs into a cell whom AC1677 flirted with. In despair, he goes to the spleen and begs to be killed, only to be refused and ordered to get back to work. The cells realize the crystal is Uric acid and the body is suffering Gout. AA2153 arrives and rallies the cells to attack the body so it will listen to them and stop its unhealthy lifestyle. When he starts injuring himself in his fury, U-1196 hugs him and begs him to stop. She returns his glasses and says it was not his fault AC1677 died, and they should honor their fallen friends by caring for the body. As he cries, the body takes Colchicine to treat the inflammation. Meanwhile, several blood vessels are clogged by cholesterol and blood clots full of dead cells.
12	"Return, the Heart, and Demise"; Transliteration: "Fukki, Shinzō, Shūen." (Japanese: 復帰、心臓、終焉。)	Toshiyuki Sone	Hayashi Mori	March 14, 2021
AA2153 finally returns to work and resumes coaching a rookie. When they pass by the stomach, he is traumatized by remembering what happened to AC1677, but cheers up when the gastric cell remembers him and says he is glad he is all right, so he works with gusto. The blood vessels have been rupturing and filling with plaque, forcing the platelets to repair them and hindering the red blood cells. Eventually, the coronary artery is completely blocked. As the body suffers a heart attack from lack of oxygen, the brain cells announce that everyone can stop working because the body is about to die. The cells riot. While U-1196 tries to get everyone to keep working and AA2153 frantically tries to get oxygen to the heart, the heart stops and the body functions shut down.
13	"Cardiac Arrest, Revival, and a Change"; Transliteration: "Shinkinkōsoku, Sosei, Henka." (Japanese: 心筋梗塞、蘇生、変化。)	Kōji Aritomi	Hayashi Mori	March 21, 2021
The body receives chest compressions and the heart fibrillates. The cells chant for the heart to work again except for a veteran red blood cell who is tired of working. The heart is shocked by a defibrillator and works again. The coronary artery gets a stent inserted to clear the blockage, allowing the blood to circulate again. The red blood cells deliver oxygen to all the body's cells, saving them. Afterwards, AA2153 reminisces about his life's journey and meets U-1196 as they note that the body has cleaned up its act. The body has stopped smoking, drinking alcohol, and eating bad food, so the body is cleaner and less stressed. U-1196 says AA2153 has matured and AA2153 says he always admired U-1196, making them blush. After the credits, the body is pierced by a syringe that sucks blood cells into it, including AA2153 and U-1196. They wake up and are horrified to find themselves in a new body that is even dirtier than the last one previously was.

== Reception ==
The Encyclopedia of Science Fiction interpreted Cells at Work! Code Black as a possible satirical commentary on capitalism and workplace pressures, with the deteriorating health of its human body implicitly linked to overwork and its anthropomorphized cells depicted as exhausted workers in a dystopian environment. It considered the series less engaging than Cells at Work!, noting that making the erythrocyte male and more conventionally heroic reduced the prominence of the female neutrophil compared with their counterparts in the original series. Nevertheless, the encyclopedia regarded it as an interesting example of science fiction horror, combined with a strong educational component explaining the workings of the human body, while criticizing some fan service, particularly the sexualized treatment of the neutrophils and their battle with gonococci that the encyclopedia deemed close to tentacle porn.
