= Hekiru Shiina =

Japanese voice actress

- 椎名 へきる
- Born: Makiko Shiina (椎名 牧子); March 12, 1974 (age 52); Tokyo, Japan
- Occupations: Voice actress; singer
- Years active: 1991–present
- Agent: Voice Kit
- Height: 152 cm (5 ft 0 in)
- Spouse: Male outside the industry (m. 2014)
- Musical career
- Genres: J-Pop; Anison
- Instrument: Vocals
- Years active: 1993–present
- Label: Warner Music Japan
- Website: www.hekiru-shiina.jp

Hekiru Shiina (椎名 へきる, Shiina Hekiru; born March 12, 1974 as Makiko Shiina (椎名 牧子, Shiina Makiko)) is a Japanese voice actress and singer. She debuted as a singer at the age of 17. Her first voice role was Tenshiko in K.O. Beast in 1992. Some of her major voice roles include Hikaru Shidou in Magic Knight Rayearth, Alpha in Yokohama Kaidashi Kikou, Ami Chono in Girls und Panzer, Tenjōin Katsura in YAT Anshin! Uchu Ryokou, and Celestia in Danganronpa: The Animation. In video games, she provided the voice of Mega Man in Mega Man: The Power Battle and Mega Man 2: The Power Fighters and Pastel in the TwinBee games. Shiina was previously associated with Arts Vision, a major agency for talent in Tokyo, and was working under Sony Music Records, her record label until 2009, when she changed over to Lantis and later Warner Music Japan. She moved from Arts Vision to Voice Kit in February 2021.

== Filmography ==
=== Anime ===
Year	Series	Role	Notes	Source
1992	K.O. Beast	Tenshiko	Debut anime voice role	
1993	Miracle Girls	Girl (B)		
1993	Mega Man: Upon a Star	Rockman, Hekideki	OVA	
1993–95	Idol Defense Force Hummingbird	Mina Toreishi		
1993–94	Tama and Friends series	Momo		
1993	Sonic Soldier Borgman II: New Century 2058	Sara		
1994	Debut	Aida Sachiko	OVA	
1994	Plastic Little	Elysse Aldo Mordish		
1994	Magical Princess Minky Momo	Girl		
1994–95	DNA²	Kotomi Takanashi	Also OAVs	
1994–97	Magic Knight Rayearth	Hikaru Shidou	Also Rayearth 2 and OAVs	
1995	Elementalors	Asami		
1995	Megami Paradise	Rurubell		
1995	Miyuki-chan in Wonderland	Woman at the door		
1995	Ruin Explorers	Fam		
1995	Dirty Pair Flash	Julian	OVA ep. 3	
1996	Sonic the Hedgehog	Miles "Tails" Prower	OVA	
1996	Shinesman	Princess Shiina		
1996–98	YAT Anshin! Uchū Ryokō	Tenjōin Katsura	Also Ryokou 2	
1998	Yokohama Kaidashi Kikou	Alpha		
1998–2000	Sorcerous Stabber Orphen	Dortin	Also Revenge	
1998–99	Twinbee Paradise	Pastel		
1999;	Eden's Bowy	Elisiss/Seeda		
2000	Invincible King Tri-Zenon	Doumu Kai		
2002	Jing: King of Bandits	Fino		
2003	Detective School Q	Reika Kurita		
2006	Kemonozume	Yuka Kamitsuki		
2006	Tokimeki Memorial Only Love	Haruka Wakatake		
2006	Usahana	Usahana (Hana)		
2008	Himitsu – Top Secret	Jun Okina		
2008	Hell Girl: Three Vessels	Yamawaro		
2010–present	Seitokai Yakuindomo	Nene Todoroki	Also OVAs and second season	
2011	Un-Go	Mitsuko Sasa	Ep. 3	
2012	Friends of Stormy Night ~ secret ~ あらしのよるに ～ひみつのともだち～	Pippi ピッピ		
2012	Girls und Panzer	Ami Chono		
2013	Danganronpa: The Animation	Celestia Ludenberg		
2014	Detective Conan	Mizuki Tachibana		
2014	Kindaichi Case Files R	Fukamori firefly 深森蛍		
2017	Hell Girl: The Fourth Twilight	Yamawarawa		
2019	Star Twinkle PreCure	Mitsuka Kaguya		
2021	Cells at Work! Code Black	Macrophage		
2023	Ayaka: A Story of Bonds and Wounds	Mitama		
2023	Yohane the Parhelion: Sunshine in the Mirror	Yohane's mother		
2024	Jellyfish Can't Swim in the Night	Honami		

=== Film ===
Year	Series	Role	Notes	Source
1997	Jungle Emperor Leo	Rukio		
2001	Inuyasha the Movie: Affections Touching Across Time	Ruri		
2015	Girls und Panzer der Film	Ami Chono		

=== Video games ===
Year	Series	Role	Notes	Source
1994	First love story 初恋物語	Risa Kijima / Eindeberu 城島理紗 / エインデベル		
1994	K.O. Beast	Tenshiko	PC Engine version	
1994	Advanced VG	Masuda Chiho	PC Engine, PlayStation versions	
1995	Magic Knight Rayearth	Hikaru Shidou		
1994–98	TwinBee! games	Pastel		
1995	Mega Man: The Power Battle	Rockman	Arcade version	
1996	Variable Geo	Chiho Masuda	PlayStation	
1996	Soul Edge ver II	Seung Mina	Arcade version	
1996	Langrisser III	Rifani	Sega Saturn version	
1996–97	Arc the Lad 2	Sania	Also subsequent games	
1997	Castlevania: Symphony of the Night			
1997	Game Tengoku	Momoko	Sega Saturn version	
1997	Farland Story - four of the seal - ファーランドストーリー ～四つの封印～	Arena アリーナ	PC	
2000	Orphen games	Dortin	PS1/PS2	
2001	Invincible King Tri-Zenon	Doumu Kai	PS1/PS2	
2010	Danganronpa: Trigger Happy Havoc	Celestia Ludenberg	Also Reload in 2013	
2011	Dream Club Zero	遙華	Xbox 360	
2012	Haganai Portable	Karen Tenjotera 天条寺可憐	PSP	
2012–15	Gal*Gun games	Haruno Tsubomi 春野つぼみ	PS3	
2013	Hetalia: The Beautiful World	Lissa		
2016	Gundam Breaker 3	Miyako		
2018	Azur Lane	Memphis		
2022	Azur Lane	Memphis META		

=== Overseas dubbing ===
Series	Role	Notes	Source
All the Boys Love Mandy Lane	Marlin		
Bend It Like Beckham	Jess		
ER	Meredith	Season 15	
Mr. Vampire	Sau		

== Discography ==
=== Studio albums ===
List of albums, with selected chart positions
Year	Title	Catalogue Number (Japan)	Oricon	
Year	Title	Catalogue Number (Japan)	Peak position	Weeks charted
1994	Shiena	Sony Music: SRCL-2939	–	–
1995	Respiration	SRCL-3196	–	–
1995	No Make Girl	SRCL-3338	–	–
1996	With a Will	SRCL-3738	–	–
1998	Baby Blue Eyes	SRCL-4179	–	–
1999	Face to Face	SRCL-4452	–	–
2000	Right Beside You	SRCL-4784	–	–
2001	Precious Garden	SRCL-4987	–	–
2002	Sadistic Pink	SRCL-5297, 5153	–	–
2003	10 Carat	SRCL-5542	–	–
2004	Wings of Time	SRCL-5975	–	–
2005	Clear Sky	SRCL-5925, 5923/4	–	–
2007	Rockin' for Love	SRCL-6489, 6497/8	50	2
2009	Rock Rose	Lantis: LACA-5947	36	2
2010	For You	LACA-15067	91	2
2013	Ermitage	LACA-15298	55	1

=== Compilation albums ===
List of compilation albums, with selected chart positions
Year	Title	Catalogue Number (Japan)	Oricon	
Year	Title	Catalogue Number (Japan)	Peak position	Weeks charted
2000	b-side you ~B-Side Collection~	Sony Music: SRCL-4785	–	–
2008	Best! ~Single Collection~	SRCL-6774~5, 6771~3	41	2
2011	Golden☆Best Hekiru Shiina ~On Animation & Game Soundtracks	MHCL-1868	122	1
2012	Hekiru Shiina single, coupling & backing tracks 1995–2000	MHCL-2190~2	41	2
2025	Love and Rock Go Together	MHCL-31072/3	40	1

=== Singles ===
List of singles, with selected chart positions
Year	Title	Catalogue Number (Japan)	Oricon		Album
Year	Title	Catalogue Number (Japan)	Peak position	Weeks charted	Album
2006	"Power Of Love/Reborn～On'na wa umarekawaru～" (Power Of Love/Reborn～女は生まれ変わる～)	Sony: SRCL-6274	45	3	
2007	"Eternal Circle"	SRCL-6471/2	51	2	
2010	"Let Me Say YEAH!!!!"	Lantis: LACM-4694	57	2	
2010	"Ashitaninareba" (明日になれば; To proceed with tomorrow)	LACM-4726	47	2	
2010	"Nagai Yume" (長い夢; Long dream)	LACM-4731	55	2	
2011	"Smash Up!!"	LACM-4802	66	2	
2011	"Wonderful days"	LACM-4891	77	2	
2012	"Miracle Blue"	LACM-4962	76	2	
2012	"Se tsu na" (セ・ツ・ナ)	LACM-14043	56	1	
