= Motoko Kumai =

Japanese voice actress (born 1970)

- くまい もとこ
- Born: September 8, 1970 (age 56); Tokyo, Japan
- Occupation: Voice actress
- Years active: 1994–present
- Agent: 81 Produce
- Notable work: Cardcaptor Sakura as Syaoran Li; Beyblade as Takao Kinomiya
- Height: 156 cm (5 ft 1 in)

Motoko Kumai (熊井 統子(くまい もとこ), Kumai Motoko; born September 8, 1970) is a Japanese voice actress employed by 81 Produce. She played Takao Kinomiya/Tyson Granger in Beyblade and Syaoran Li in Cardcaptor Sakura. From December 21, 2006, to October 2007, she had a hiatus from her career due to an illness requiring medical treatment.

== Filmography ==
=== Television animation ===
1990s

- After War Gundam X (1996), Kid Salsamille
- YAT Anshin! Uchū Ryokō (1996), Gorō Hoshiwatari
- Flame of Recca (1997), Kaoru Koganei
- In the Beginning: Stories from the Bible (1997), Mimi
- Pokémon (1997), Tarō
- Alice SOS (1998), Takashi Sagano
- Akihabara Dennō Gumi (1998), Tetsurō
- Cardcaptor Sakura (1998-2000), Syaoran Li
- Space Pirate Mito (1999), Sabu
- Detective Conan (1999), Toshiya (ep 129)
- Digimon Adventure (1999), Sukamon
- Karakurizōshi Ayatsuri Sakon (1999), Ukon the puppet

2000s

- Digimon Adventure 02 (2000), Sukamon
- Baby Felix (2000), Skippy
- Bakuten Shoot Beyblade (2001-2003), Takao Kinomiya
- Detective Conan (2001), Rintarō Koizumi (ep 225)
- X/1999 (2001), Nataku
- Inuyasha (2001), Tarōmaru (ep 27)
- Zoids: New Century (2001), Vega Obscura
- Chobits (2002), Sumomo
- Gravion (2002), Kukki
- Pita-Ten (2002), Hiroshi Mitarai
- Shaman King (2002), Chocolove McDonell
- Ninja Scroll: The Series (2003), Takuma
- Papuwa (2003), Papuwa
- Gravion Zwei (2004), Kukki
- Kyo Kara Maoh! (2004), Greta
- Zatch Bell! (2004), Reycom
- Major (2004), Gorō Honda
- MÄR (2005), Ginta Toramizu
- Onegai My Melody (2005), Naomi
- Spider Riders (2006–07), Hunter Steele
- Allison & Lillia (2008), Wilhelm Schultz
- Soul Eater (2008), Ryōku
- Stitch! (2008), Yuna Kamihara
- Stitch! ~Itazura Alien no Daibōken~ (2009), Yuna

2010s

- Stitch! ~Zutto Saikō no Tomodachi~ (2010), Yuna
- HeartCatch PreCure! (2010), Coffret
- Kuragehime (2010), Banba
- Detective Conan (2011), Apollo Glass (ep 616-621)
- Pretty Rhythm: Aurora Dream (2011), Neko-chi, Itsuki Harune
- Yu-Gi-Oh! Zexal (2011), Shōbē Yuatsu/Cody Callus
- Gon (2012), Gon
- Hunter × Hunter (Second Series) (2012), Canaria
- Pokémon XY (2014), Nini/Nene
- Gintama (2015), Hattori Zenzou (Young)
- JoJo's Bizarre Adventure: Stardust Crusaders (2015), Boingo
- Digimon Universe: Appli Monsters (2016), Dokamon
- Chi's Sweet Adventure (2016–18), Kocchi
- Cardcaptor Sakura: Clear Card (2018), Syaoran Li
- GeGeGe no Kitaro (2018), Jiromaru

2020s

- Motto! Majime ni Fumajime Kaiketsu Zorori (2020), Noshishi
- Shaman King (2021), Chocolove McDonell
- Mao (2026), Funa Uozumi

Unknown date

- Fushigi Yūgi (Young Tamahome)
- Kobato Keita Yoshimura
- Mirmo! (Sasuke/Sazo)
- Shin Megami Tensei: Devil Children (Takajo Zett)
- Ultraman: Super Fighter Legend (Kochan)
- Wedding Peach (Putrid)

=== Film animation ===
- Naruto Shippūden 2: Bonds (2008) (Amaru)
- Pokémon: Arceus and the Jewel of Life (2009) (Kanta)
- Yo-kai Watch: Enma Daiō to Itsutsu no Monogatari da Nyan! (2015) (Takayuki)

=== ONA ===
- Chi's Sweet Summer Vacation (2024), Kocchi

=== OVA ===
- Amon: The Darkside of the Devilman (2000) (Tare-chan)
- Saint Young Men (2012) (Daisuke)

=== Video games ===
- Puzzle Bobble 4 (1997) (Drunk)
- Pop'n Pop (1998) (Bubby)
- Tokimeki Memorial 2 (1999) (Homura Akai)
- Final Fantasy X (2001) (Pacce)
- Ape Escape 2 (2002) (Hikaru/Jimmy)
- Inuyasha (2001) (Tarōmaru)
- Final Fantasy X-2 (2003) (Pacce)
- J-Stars Victory VS (2014) (Taro Yamada)
- Dragon Quest Treasures (2022) (Erik)

=== Dubbing roles ===
Live-action

- 3000 Miles to Graceland (Jesse)
- Anna and the King (Prince Chulalongkorn)
- Babe (NHK edition) (Babe)
- Bounce (Scott Janello)
- Boy Meets World (seasons 1 and 2) (Cornelius "Cory" A. Matthews)
- Children of Heaven (Ali)
- Gilmore Girls (Freddy)
- Growing Pains (season 4) (Benjamin "Ben" Hubert Horatio Humphrey Seaver)
- Honey (Benny)
- iCarly (Gibby Gibson)
- The Ice Storm (Sandy Carver)
- Jumanji (Fuji TV edition) (Billy Jessup)
- Liar Liar (Max Reed)
- Lost in Space (VHS/DVD/Blu-ray edition) (Will Robinson)
- Ma vie en rose (Jérôme)
- Music of the Heart (Nick)
- Screamers (David)
- Space Jam (Young Michael Jordan, Jeffrey Jordan)
- Speed 2: Cruise Control (Fuji TV edition) (Drew)
- Tooth Fairy (Randy Harris)

Animation

- Donkey Kong Country (Polly Roger)
- Dora the Explorer (TV Tokyo edition) (Dora Marquez, Sabrina, Snow Princess)
- My Little Pony: Equestria Girls (Spike)
- My Little Pony: Equestria Girls – Rainbow Rocks (Spike)
- My Little Pony: Friendship Is Magic (Spike)
- Transformers: Prime (Rafael Esquivel)

=== Other work ===
- Kumai and Yukana Nogami star in four adaptations for Clamp:
  - in Cardcaptor Sakura, as Li Syaoran.
  - in Chobits, as Sumomo.
  - in X/1999, as Nataku.
  - in Kobato, as Yoshimura Keita.
- She performed the 1st opening ("Go Ahead") for Beyblade G-revolution as well as the insert song in Cardcaptor Sakura EP 57 ("Ki ni Naru Aitsu")
- She has been in two anime based on manga by Nobuyuki Anzai:
  - Flame of Recca as Kaoru Koganei
  - Marchen Awakens Romance as Ginta Toramizu
- She has performed in Drama CDs, as well, playing the role of Edward in the Clock Tower Second Drama CD.
- Cohosted radio show Seishun!! Tako Shōjo alongside manga artist and TV personality Tooru Yamazaki.
