= Sachiko Kobayashi =

Japanese singer (born 1953)

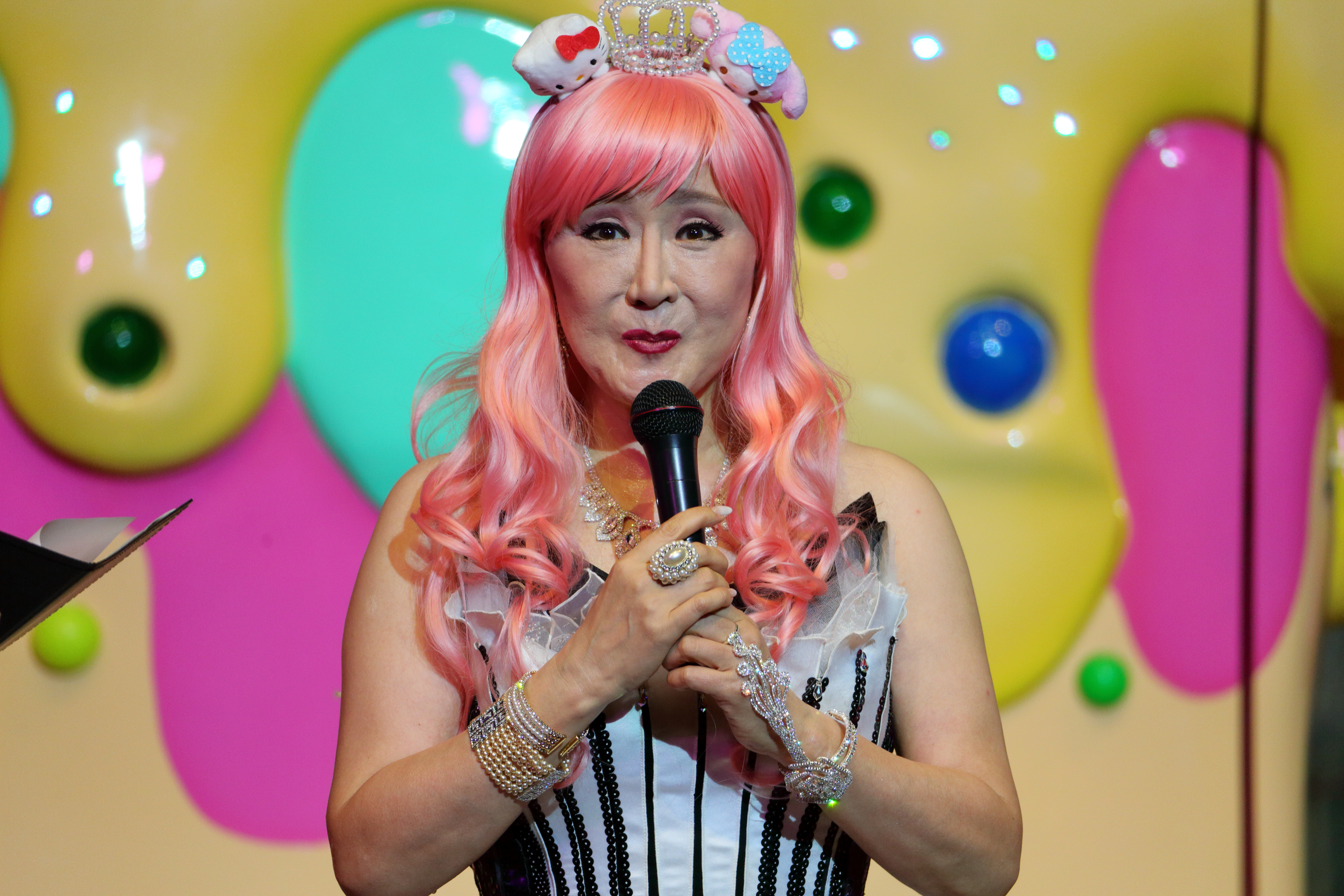
- Sachiko Kobayashi performing in 2017

Background information
- Also known as: Mayumi Oka (岡 真由美); Virtual Grandmother Sachiko Kobayashi
- Born: Sachiko Hayashi (林 幸子); December 5, 1953 (age 72); Niigata, Japan
- Genres: Enka, Kayōkyoku
- Occupations: Singer, voice actress
- Instrument: Vocals
- Years active: 1963–present
- Label: Nippon Columbia
- Website: sachiko.co.jp

Sachiko Kobayashi (小林 幸子, Kobayashi Sachiko; born December 5, 1953) is a female Japanese enka singer and occasional voice actress and voice provider of VOCALOID 4 Sachiko developed by YAMAHA co. She previously worked alongside the Pokémon Company, under the alias "Garura Kobayashi".

== Biography ==
When Kobayashi was 9 years old in 1963, she became a champion in the TBS-produced "Uta Mane Tokuhon" (歌まね読本) music variety show and was scouted by famous Japanese composer and guitarist Masao Koga. Although Kobayashi was only a grade four student, her voice was said to be exactly like well-known Japanese enka singer Hibari Misora.

One year later, Kobayashi and her family left their hometown, Niigata, Niigata and headed to Tokyo where she released her debut song, "Usotsuki Kamome" (ウソツキ鴎).

In 1968, she acted as the heroine in "Aoi Taiyou" (青い太陽), a TV drama produced by TV Asahi. The drama's ending song was also credited to her. However, after 1968, Kobayashi's level of celebrity dropped, thus causing her to get fewer TV appearances and other opportunities.

In 1979, her song "Omoide Sake" (おもいで酒) reached number 1 on the Oricon Singles Chart, and spent 55 weeks in that chart. The song was number 1 on The Best Ten annual chart for 1979, announced on 27 December 1979. The song became the best seller of the year, winning the 21st Japan Record Awards, and causing her to be popular again. As a result, she was asked to take part in the illustrious annual end-of-year music show "Kōhaku Uta Gassen". After 1979, Kobayashi was considered one of the most famous enka singers in Japan until now. Her more recent activity has intersected with Japanese otaku culture.

Her single "Tomarigi" (とまり木) (1980) reached number 4 on the Oricon Singles Chart, and spent 30 weeks in that chart. Her single "Futari Wa Hitori" (ふたりはひとり) (1980) reached number 11 on the Oricon Singles Chart, and spent 22 weeks in that chart. Her single "Kaze To Issho Ni" (風といっしょに) (1998) reached number 17 on the Oricon Singles Chart, and spent 19 weeks in that chart.

In July 2015, a Vocaloid called "Sachiko" was released by Yamaha based upon her voice for the Vocaloid 4 engine.

In April 2018, coinciding with the launch of her official YouTube channel, Kobayashi debuted her Virtual YouTuber persona, Virtual Grandmother Sachiko Kobayashi. At Nico Nico Chōkaigi, she collaborated with fellow Vtuber Kizuna AI on a cover of Vocaloid Hatsune Miku's song "Senbonzakura". Kobayashi also had a recurring "Virtual Grandmother" segment in 2019 Vtuber sketch comedy show, "VIRTUAL-SAN - LOOKING".

== Discography ==
=== Singles ===
- Usotsuki Kamome (ウソツキ鴎)(1964.06.05)
- Hahagoi Okesa (母恋いおけさ)(1964.09)
- Watasha monashigo Kakubeejishi (私しゃみなしご角兵衛獅子)(1964.11)
- Hanagasa Musume (花笠むすめ)(1965.01)
- Shonankou (小楠公) (1965.03)
- Chibikko Kazoeuta (ちびっ子数え歌)(1965.05)
- Chibikko Yakusha (ちびっ子役者)(1965.07)
- Yuyake Kozou (夕焼け小僧)(1965.09)
- Sayonara hatoba wa Gogo sanji (サヨナラ波止場は午後三時)(1965.11)
- Dekasegi Tou-chan no Uta (出稼ぎ父ちゃんの歌)(1966.02)
- Yamabiko Shoujo (山びこ少女)(1966.06)
- Itako Jusan ya (潮来十三夜)(1966.11)
- Taiyou wa Oshieru (太陽は教える)(1967.01)
- Tanpopo no Oka (たんぽぽの丘)(1967.08)
- Aoi Taiyou (青い太陽)(1968.04)
- Osuki na Toki ni (お好きな時に)(1969.11)
- Wagamama Na Kanata (わがままな貴方)(1970.02)
- Komarasetai no (こまらせたいの)(1970.08)
- Nazeka Koishikute (なぜか恋しくて)(1971.04)
- Yagate Hatachi ni naru Onna (やがて二十才になる女)(1971.09)
- Kimagure na Watashi (気まぐれなわたし)(1972.07)
- Koi Jigoku Miren banashi/Furusatomonme (恋地獄未練ばなし・ふるさともんめ)(1973.06)
- Aki (秋)(1976.08)
- Koibumi Ressha (恋文列車)(1977.08)
- Otoko To Onna No Magarikatou (男と女の曲がり角)(1977.10.25)
- Harumachi Rengeso (春待ちれんげ草)(1978.01.25)
- Oyome ni iku wa (お嫁に行くわ)(1978.06.21)
- Rokuji, Shichiji, Hachiji Anata wa (六時、七時、八時あなたは…)(1979.01.25)
- Omoide Sake (おもいで酒)(1979.01.25)
- Tomarigi (とまり木)(1980.01.01)
- DELUXE 4 DELUXE Tomariki/Harumachi Rengeso/Omoide Zake/Otoko To Onna No Magarikatou (DELUXE 4 DELUXE とまり木／春待ちれんげ草／おもいで酒／男と女の曲り角)(Unknown)
- Futari wa Hitori (ふたりはひとり)(1980.06.01)
- Are kara Ichinen Tachimashita (あれから一年たちました)(1980.09.25)
- Ushirokage (うしろかげ)(1981.02.10)
- Mayoidori (迷い鳥)(1981.06.11)
- Nakase yagatte Konoyarou (泣かせやがってこのやろう)(1982.01.01)
- Mou ichido dake (もう一度だけ)(1982.06.25)
- Futatabino (ふたたびの)(1983.01.25)
- Moshikashite (もしかして)(1984.01.25)
- Moshikashite PartII (もしかしてPARTII)(1984.07.10)
- Yaguruma Nikki (矢車日記)(1984.09.25)
- Hitobanntometene/Meoto Shigure (ひと晩泊めてね／夫婦しぐれ)(1985.02.25)
- Wakare (別離)(1986.02.25)
- Onna no Waltz (女の円舞曲／別離)(1986.09.10)
- Yuki Tsubaki (雪椿)(1987.06.25)
- Koi No Manjushage (恋の曼珠沙華)(1988.02.25)
- Fudanso (不断草)(1989.06.25)
- Fukujuso (福寿草)(1989.02.25)
- Merankurikku.Mama (メランコリック・ママ)(1989.09.25)
- Furusato (故郷)(1990.04.10)
- Inochi Moyu (天命燃ゆ)(1990.11.15)
- Fuyu Geshou (冬化粧)(1991.08.25)
- Koi Botaru (恋螢)(1992.06.21)
- Namida No Kazu dake Kikazatte~Konna Watashi ja Arumaani~ (涙の数だけ着飾って～こんな私じゃあるまーに～)(1992.07.10)
- Ichiyakagiri (一夜かぎり)(1993.02.22)
- Nihon Rettou Hana hana Ontou/Kokoro wa Hana No You ni (日本列島花はな音頭／心は花のように)(1993.04.10)
- Hanarete Soshite (別れて…そして)(1993.04.10)
- Yakusoku (約束)(1993.10.10)
- Ame no Yataizake (雨の屋台酒) (1994.03l.25)
- Haha Hitori (母ひとり)(1995.06.25)
- Echigo Jouwa (越後情話) (1996.08.30)
- Shiawase (幸せ)(1997.08.30)
- Super Select Series Omoide Zake.Tomarigi (スーパー・セレクトシリーズ おもいで酒／とまり木)(1997.12.10)
- Super Select Series Yuki Tsubaki.Haha Hitori (スーパー・セレクトシリーズ 雪椿／母ひとり)(1997.12.10)
- Super Select Series Fufuushigure.Yakuruma Nikki (スーパー・セレクトシリーズ 夫婦しぐれ／矢車日記)(1997.12.10)
- Super Select Series Fukusyu Kusa.Ame No Yataizake (スーパー・セレクトシリーズ 福寿草／雨の屋台酒)(1997.12.10)
- Super Select Series Moshikashite PartII.Futatabino (スーパー・セレクトシリーズ もしかしてPARTII／ふたたびの)(1997.12.10)
- Torikaekko Please (とりかえっこプリーズ)(1998.02.10)
- Tsuki Densetsu (雨月伝説)(1998.02.21)
- Kaze to issho ni (風といっしょに)(1998.09.03)
- Yancha Sake (やんちゃ酒)(1999.01.01)
- Nito Monogatari/Aoi no Naka e (二都物語／蒼のなかへ)(1999.09.10)
- Ojizou Sanba (お地蔵サンバ)(1999.09.22)
- Nakase Ame (泣かせ雨)(2000.01.01)
- Sayonara Arigatou (さよならありがとう)(2000.04.21)
- Ryuhyo Aika (流氷哀歌)(2001.01.01)
- Inochi Shirazu No Wataridori (命しらずの渡り鳥)(2001.01.01)
- Genki de ite ne (元気でいてね)(2001.04.21)
- Yume no Hate~Shigosen no Yume (夢の涯て～子午線の夢～)(2001.09.01)
- Setsunaiyo (雪泣夜)(2002.01.01)
- Setsunaiyo SE Serifu iri/Dareka ga soba ni iru~[Honmamon]yori~ (雪泣夜 (SEセリフ入り）／誰かがそばにいる～「ほんまもん」より～)(2002.06.21)
- Machiwabite~Kaou~ (待ちわびて～華王～)(2002.12.05)
- Ribbon(2003.01.01)
- Kujyaku (孔雀)(2003.01.01)
- Haruzemi (春蝉)(2003.08.20)
- Isoshigi (いそしぎ)(2004.03.03)
- Oedo Kenka Hana (大江戸喧嘩花)(2006.06.21)
- Koi Zakura (恋桜)(2007.06.21)
- Kanashimi no Tobari (悲しみの帳)(2008.02.20)
- Rouran (楼蘭)(2008.08.20)
- Manyokoiuta Aa Kimimatsuto (万葉恋歌 ああ君待っと)(2009)
- Shiroi Yuge no Uta/Kaachan no Hitori (白いゆげの歌/母ちゃんのひとり言)(2010.01.27)
- Ibara no Ki (茨の木)(2010.10.17)
- Onna no Sakaba/Koi no Kakehiki (おんなの酒場/恋のかけひき) (2011.06.01)
- Hotaru Zensen (蛍前線)(2013.06.05)
- Echigo ni Nemuru (越後に眠る)(2014.06.04)
- Iro-iro aru kedo Aitai yo (色々あるけど会いたいよ)(2015.06.03)
- Mugen no Blanc Noir (無限∞ブランノワール)(2015.10.28)
- Hyakka Ryouran (百花繚乱!アッパレ!ジパング!)(2016.07.06)
- Samba DE Wassyoi! (サンバDEわっしょい!)(2016.07.13)
- Yookoso Arks (ヨーコソ・アークス)(2016.08.18)
- Sonzai Shoumei (存在証明) (2017.12.06)
- Poker Face ni Sayonara (ポーカーフェイスにさよなら)(2019.02.06)

=== Album ===
- Sachiko Kobayashi's Hit Show (小林幸子のヒット・ショー) (1964.11)
- Harumachi Rengesō (春待ちれんげ草) (1978.06)
- Omoidezake (おもいで酒) (1979.07.25)
- Sachiko Shō (幸子抄) (1979.11.28)
- Tomarigi (とまり木) (1980.04.25)
- Futari wa Hitori (ふたりはひとり) (1980.07.25)
- Sachiko, Natsumero wo Utau (幸子、懐メロを唄う) (1980.08.10)
- Are kara Ichinen tachimashita (あれから一年たちました) (Unknown 1980)
- Koga Masao Melody Shū (古賀政男メロディー集) (1980.12.23)
- ~ Ushiro Kage (~うしろかげ) (1981.04.25)
- [Mayoidori] Yusen Standard Hit (「迷い鳥」有線スタンダードヒット) (Unknown 1981)
- Original Hit All Songs Collection: From Omoidezake to Mayoidori (オリジナル・ヒット全曲集〜おもいで酒から迷い鳥まで〜) (Unknown 1981)
- Nakase yagatte kono yarō -Hoshino Tetsurō Original- (泣かせやがってこのやろう -星野哲郎オリジナル-) (Unknown 1982)
- Enka Million Hit wo Utau (演歌ミリオンヒットを唄う) (Unknown 1982)
- 82 Best Hit Kobayashi Sachiko Zenkyokushu ('82ベストヒット 小林幸子全曲集) (Unknown 1982)
- Futatabi no' (ふたたびの) (Unknown 1983)
- '77~'83 Kobayashi Sachiko Daisenshuu ('77〜'83小林幸子大全集) (Unknown 1983)
- Moshi kashite (もしかして) (1984.04.25)
- Moshi kashite Part 2 Sachiko Best Selection (もしかしてPARTII 幸子ベストセレクション) (1984.11.28)
- Hitoban tomete ne Kobayashi Sachiko Zenkyoku shū (ひと晩泊めてね 小林幸子全曲集) (1985.04.25)
- Enka no Kado (演歌の花道) (1985.11.28)
- Wakare (別離) (1986.04.25)
- Enkashou Sachiko Kobayashi on Stage (艶華抄 小林幸子オン・ステージ) (1986.12.10)
- Yuki Tsubaki Enka Hit Collection (雪椿・演歌ヒット集) (1987.11.10)
- Geino Seikatsu 25th Anniversary Hishou (芸能生活25周年記念 飛翔) (1988.09.10)
- Enka Ryoran: New Best Hit (艶華撩乱 〜最新ベスト・ヒット〜) (1989.09.10)
- Furusato: Original Best (故郷 〜オリジナル・ベスト〜) (1990.06.25)
- Sachiko Kobayashi '90 Live in Nakano Plaza: Hana kara Hana e (小林幸子'90ライヴイン中野プラザ 〜花から華へ〜) (1990.12.21)
- Tenmeimoyu: '91 Sachiko Senkyoku Hit Collection (天命燃ゆ 〜'91幸子選曲ヒット集〜) (1991.06.25)
- Fuyu Gesho: Original Best (冬化粧 〜オリジナルベスト〜) (1991.12.10)
- Sachiko Kobayashi Zenkyoku Shu Part 1 (小林幸子全曲集パートI) (1992.10.25)
- Sachiko Kobayashi Zenkyoku Shu Part 2 (小林幸子全曲集パートII) (1992.12.05)
- Geino Seikatsu 30-nen Kinen Daizenshu Sachi (芸能生活三十周年記念大全集 幸) (1993.06.25)
- Toki wo kasanete Kobayashi Sachiko 30-shūnen Kinen Rectial (時間をかさねて 小林幸子30周年記念リサイタル) (1993.10.21)
- Kobayashi Sachiko Zenkyokushu: Ame no Yatai Zake (小林幸子全曲集 雨の屋台酒) (1994.06.25)
- Haha hitori: Aijō no Tamatebako (母ひとり 〜愛情の玉手箱〜) (1995.12.21)
- Sachiko Kobayashi's Original New Best: Echigo Jouwa (小林幸子オリジナル ニュー・ベスト 越後情話) (1996.10.19)
- Sachiko Kobayashi's Best Selection (小林幸子ベストセレクション) (1996.10.25)
- Kobayashi Sachiko Tokusenshu: Echigo Jouwa (小林幸子特選集 越後情話) (1997.05.21)
- Kobayashi Sachiko Shiawase (小林幸子全曲集 幸せ) (1997.10.04)
- Kobayashi Sachiko Tokusenshū Tsuki Densetsu (小林幸子特選集 雨月伝説) (1998.04.21)
- Kobayashi Sachiko Bugi wo Utau: Music Producer: MIYAGAWA YASUSHI (小林幸子ブギを唄う 〜音楽プロデュース：宮川泰〜) (1998.06.05)
- Kashu Seikatsu 35-Shūnen Kinen Twin Pack, Kobayashi Sachiko: Tsuki Densetsu (歌手生活35周年記念ツイン・パック小林幸子 雨月伝説) (1998.08.01)
- Kobayashi Sachiko Zenkyokushu Tsuki Densetsu (小林幸子全曲集 雨月伝説) (1998.11.21)
- Sachiko Kobayashi Golden Best (小林幸子ゴールデンベスト) (1999.02.20)
- Kobayashi Sachiko Tokusenshu: Yancha Sake (小林幸子特選集 やんちゃ酒) (1999.05.01)
- Kobayashi Sachiko Zenkyokushuu '99 Yancha Sake (小林幸子全曲集'99 やんちゃ酒) (1999.08.21)
- Enka Meikyoku-sen -Nakase Ame- (演歌名曲選 -泣かせ雨-) (2000.02.19)
- Kobayashi Sachiko Zenkyokushuu 2000 Nakase Ame (小林幸子全曲集2000 泣かせ雨) (2000.09.01)
- Tokusen Best Kobayashi Sachiko Ryūhyō Aika (特選ベスト小林幸子 流氷哀歌) (2001.01.20)
- Twin Pack Kobayashi Sachiko Ryūhyō Aika (ツイン・パック小林幸子 流氷哀歌) (2001.04.21)
- Kobayashi Sachiko Zenkyokushū Yume no gai te: Jigosen no yume (小林幸子全曲集 夢の涯て 〜子午線の夢〜) (2001.11.21)
- Sachiko Kobayashi Golden Best (小林幸子ゴールデンベスト) (2002.04.20)
- Kobayashi Sachiko Zenkyokushu: Yuki Nakiyoru (小林幸子全曲集 雪泣夜) (2002.10.19)
- Columbia Otoku-ban Series: Sachiko Kobayashi (コロムビア音得盤シリーズ 小林幸子) (2002.12.04)
- Geinō Seikatsu 40th Anniversary Album: Album Kujaku (芸能生活40周年記念アルバム 孔雀) (2003.06.05)
- Kobayashi Sachiko Zenkyokushū Haruzemi (小林幸子全曲集 春蝉) (2003.10.22)
- Kobayashi Sachiko Tokusenshū Isoshigi (小林幸子特選集 いそしぎ) (2004.05.19)
- Kobayashi Sachiko Zenkyokushū Isoshigi (小林幸子全曲集 いそしぎ) (2004.10.20)
- Sachiko Kobayashi Special Best (小林幸子スペシャルベスト) (2005.07.20)
- Kobayashi Sachiko Zenkyokushū Echigo Zesshō (小林幸子全曲集 越後絶唱) (2005.10.19)
- Sachiko Kobayashi Golden Best (小林幸子ゴールデンベスト) (2006.06.21)
- Kobayashi Sachiko Zenkyokushū Oedo Kenka Hana (小林幸子全曲集 大江戸喧嘩花) (2006.10.18)
- Kobayashi Sachiko Meikyoku-sen Koi Sakura (小林幸子名曲選 恋桜) (2007.07.04)
- Kobayashi Sachiko Zenkyokushū Koi Sakura (小林幸子全曲集 恋桜) (2007.10.17)
- Sachiko Kobayashi Golden Best (小林幸子ゴールデンベスト) (2008.06.18)
- Geinō Seikatsu 45th Anniversary Album: Kizuna (芸能生活45周年記念アルバム 絆) (2008.10.01)
- Kobayashi Sachiko Zenkyokushū: Rōran (小林幸子全曲集 楼蘭) (2008.11.19)
- Super Best (スーパーベスト) (2009.05.20)
- Kobayashi Sachiko Zenkyokushū Manyōkoiuta ā, Kimi matsu to (小林幸子全曲集 万葉恋歌 ああ、君待つと) (2009.10.21)
- Sachiko Kobayashi Hit Song Collection 2010 (小林幸子ヒット曲集2010) (2010.06.23)
- Kobayashi Sachiko Zenkyokushū Kāchan no Hitorigoto (小林幸子全曲集 母ちゃんのひとり言) (2010.10.20)
- Kobayashi Sachiko Endō Minoru o utau (小林幸子 遠藤実を唄う) (2011.03.23)
- Sachiko Kobayashi's Cover and Original Song Collection: Natsukashi no Hit Kyoku wo Utau (小林幸子カヴァー＆オリジナル曲集 〜なつかしのヒット曲を唄う〜) (2011.03.23)
- Kobayashi Sachiko Zenkyokushū Onna no Sakaba (小林幸子全曲集 おんなの酒場) (2011.10.19)
- Sachiko Kobayashi Premium Best 2012 (小林幸子プレミアム・ベスト 2012) (2012.05.23)
- S (2013.09.04)
- K (2013.12.04)
- Sachi-Sachi ni shite ageru (さちさちにしてあげる♪) (2014.08.17)
- Sachi henge (さちへんげ) (2015.08.17)
- SACHIKO THE BEST (2016.12.26)
- PINSPOT ～Sachiko's Night Club～ (2018.07.04)

=== Other songs ===
- "Poketto ni Fantajī" (Ending for Pokémon: Original Series Chapter 1: Sekiei Rīgu), sung with Juri Ihata)
- "Pokémon Ondo" (Ending for Pokémon: Original Series Chapter 1: Sekiei Rīgu) & Pokémon: Original Series Chapter 2: Orenji Shōto Hen) sung with Unshō Ishizuka & Kōichi Sakaguchi)
- "Yokoso Arks" (Collaboration song for Phantasy Star Online 2, collaborated with Beat Mario)
- "Kaze to issho ni" (Ending for Pokémon Movie 1: Myūtsū no Gyakushū)
- "Kaze to issho ni" (Ending for Myūtsū no Gyakushū EVOLUTION, sung with Shoko Nakagawa)
- "Suteki na Korekushon" (from the Pokémon: Kaze to issho ni album), sung with Raymond Johnson
- "Torikaekko Purīzu" (from the Pokémon: Torikaekko Purīzu album)

== Filmography ==
=== Movie ===
- Zatoichi's Revenge (座頭市二段斬り with Shintaro Katsu) 1965
- A Certain Killer (ある殺し屋 with Ichikawa Raizō VIII) 1967
- Kewaishi (化粧師 KEWAISHI with Kippei Shiina) 2002
- Devilman (デビルマン) 2004

=== TV Anime ===
- Pokémon (ポケットモンスター) 1997
- Yatterman (ヤッターマン) 2008
- Danganronpa: The Animation (ダンガンロンパ) 2013 – "Monokuma Ondo" (モノクマおんど)
- VIRTUAL-SAN - LOOKING (バーチャルさんはみている) 2019 - as Virtual Grandmother Sachiko Kobayashi

=== TV commercials ===
- Pippu Erekiban (ピップエレキバン)
- Honda Airwave (ホンダ・エアウェイブ), 2007
- Toyo Suisan (東洋水産), 2010
- Nyanko Daisensou (にゃんこ大戦争) 2014
- Niigata-gen; Niigata-gen policeman Tokushu Sagi Higai Boushi Keihatsu "Kiken Sacchi" (新潟県・新潟県警察 特殊詐欺被害防止啓発)「危険さっち」), 2016
- Kirin: Hyoketsu (キリン「氷結」), 2016
- Cup Noodles (日清食品 カップヌードル), 2016–present

=== TV Dramas ===
- DCU 2022 - as Aki Negishi (ep. 7)

=== Kōhaku Uta Gassen Appearances ===
Year	#	Song	No.	VS	Remarks
1979 (Showa 54)/30th	1	Omoide Sake (おもいで酒)	18/23	Masao Sen	
1980 (Showa 55)/31st	2	Tomarigi (とまり木)	22/23	Shinichi Mori	Second Finale
1981 (Showa 56)/32nd	3	Mayoidori (迷い鳥)	19/22	Hiroshi Uchiyamada and Cool Five	
1982 (Showa 57)/33rd	4	Omoide Sake (2)	20/22	Saburō Kitajima	
1983 (Showa 58)/34th	5	Futatabino (ふたたびの)	20/21	Shinichi Mori (2)	Second Finale (2)
1984 (Showa 59)/35th	6	Moshikashite (もしかして)	19/20	Hiroshi Itsuki	Second Finale (3)
1985 (Showa 60)/36th	7	Meoto Shigure (夫婦しぐれ)	19/20	Hiroshi Itsuki (2)	Second Finale (4)
1986 (Showa 61)/37th	8	Wakare (別離)	19/20	Hiroshi Itsuki (3)	Second Finale (5)
1987 (Showa 62)/38th	9	Yuki Tsubaki (雪椿)	17/20	Niinuma Kenji	
1988 (Showa 63)/39th	10	Yuki Tsubaki (2)	21/21	Saburō Kitajima (2)	Finale
1989 (Heisei 1)/40th	11	Fukushu Kusa (福寿草)	18/20	Shinichi Mori (3)	
1990 (Heisei 2)/41st	12	Inochi Moyu (天命燃ゆ)	19/29	Masashi Sada	
1991 (Heisei 3)/42nd	13	Fuyu Keshou (冬化粧)	22/28	Noriyuki Makihara	
1992 (Heisei 4)/43rd	14	Koi Botaru (恋螢)	22/28	Kome Kome Club	
1993 (Heisei 5)/44th	15	Yakusoku (約束)	21/26	Akira Kobayashi	
1994 (Heisei 6)/45th	16	Ame No Yataizake (雨の屋台酒)	20/25	Kenichi Mikawa	
1995 (Heisei 7)/46th	17	Haha Hitori (母ひとり)	18/25	Kenichi Mikawa (2)	
1996 (Heisei 8)/47th	18	Echigo Jouwa (越後情話)	18/25	Sharam Q	
1997 (Heisei 9)/48th	19	Shiawase (幸せ)	17/25	X Japan	
1998 (Heisei 10)/49th	20	Kazetoishoni (風といっしょに)	18/25	T.M.Revolution	
1999 (Heisei 11)/50th	21	Yancha Sake (やんちゃ酒)	23/27	Masashi Sada (2)	
2000 (Heisei 12)/51st	22	Nakase Ame (泣かせ雨)	23/28	Hiromi Go	
2001 (Heisei 13)/52nd	23	Yume no Gai~Jigosen no Yume (夢の涯て～子午線の夢～)	15/27	Gackt	
2002 (Heisei 14)/53rd	24	Setsunaiyo (雪泣夜)	19/27	Mikawa Kenichi (3)	
2003 (Heisei 15)/54th	25	Kujyaku (孔雀)	21/30	Mikawa Kenichi (4)	
2004 (Heisei 16)/55th	26	Yuki Tsubaki (3)	15/27	Itsuki Hiroshi (4)	Finale (2)
2005 (Heisei 17)/56th	27	Echigo Jeshou (越後絶唱)	19/29	T.M.Revolution (2)	
2006 (Heisei 18)/57th	28	Daiedo Kenka Hana (大江戸喧嘩花)	19/27	DJ Ozma	
2007 (Heisei 19)/58th	29	Koi Zakura (恋桜)	16/27	Gackt (2)	
2008 (Heisei 20)/59th	30	Rouran (楼蘭)	21/26	EXILE	
2009 (Heisei 21)/60th	31	Manyukoeta Aa Kimimatsuto (万葉恋歌 ああ君待っと)	20/25	Masaharu Fukuyama	
2010 (Heisei 22)/61st	32	Kaachan no Hitori (母ちゃんのひとり言)	17/22	Masaharu Fukuyama (2)	
2011 (Heisei 23)/62nd	33	Onna no Sakaba (おんなの酒場)	17/25	Toshiyuki Nishida	
2015 (Heisei 27)/66th	Special	Senbonzakura (千本桜)			Returned after 4 years

=== Dubbing ===
==== Live-action ====
- Haunted Mansion (Madame Leota (Jamie Lee Curtis))

==== Animation ====
- Meet the Robinsons (Mildred)
