= Papuwa =

Japanese manga series

- Cover of DVD 1: Wild Things

南国少年パプワくん (Nangoku Shōnen Papuwa-kun)
- Manga
- Written by: Ami Shibata
- Published by: Enix
- Magazine: Monthly Shōnen Gangan
- Original run: April 1991 – June 1995
- Volumes: 7
- Anime television series
- Directed by: Jun Takagi
- Produced by: Kenji Ota; Shigeo Endo
- Music by: Nobuyuki Nakamura
- Studio: Nippon Animation
- Original network: ANN (TV Asahi)
- Original run: 10 October 1992 – 2 October 1993
- Episodes: 42
- Manga

Papuwa
- Written by: Ami Shibata
- Published by: Square Enix
- Magazine: Monthly Shōnen Gangan
- Original run: April 2002 – February 2008
- Volumes: 14
- Anime television series

Papuwa
- Directed by: Kenichi Nishida
- Written by: Toshiki Inoue
- Music by: Yuko Fukushima
- Studio: Nippon Animation
- Original network: TXN (TV Tokyo)
- English network: US: Anime Network
- Original run: 30 September 2003 – 30 March 2004
- Episodes: 26

Nangoku Shōnen Papuwa-kun (Japanese: 南国少年パプワくん; lit. 'Papuwa, the Tropical Boy') is a Japanese manga series written and illustrated by Ami Shibata. The manga was one of the first to be serialized in Enix's manga magazine Monthly Shōnen Gangan, where it ran from 1991 to 1995, with its chapters collected into seven tankōbon volumes. The story follows Shintaro, a defector from the Ganma Army, who finds himself stranded on an uncharted island inhabited by the title character and other eccentric creatures. The series was adapted into a 42-episode anime television series by Nippon Animation which aired on TV Asahi and its affiliates from October 1992 to October 1993.

A sequel series also written and illustrated by Shibata, titled Papuwa (stylized in all caps), follows Kotaro, Shintaro's younger brother with no memory of his past, as he becomes stranded on a new Papuwa Island. This series was serialized in Monthly Shōnen Gangan from April 2002 to February 2008, with its chapters collected into 14 tankōbon volumes. It was adapted into an anime television series, also produced by Nippon Animation, which aired on TV Tokyo and its affiliates from September 2003 to March 2004. This series was formerly licensed in North America by ADV Films.

== Story ==
Once, on an unknown southern island, a battle was waged over two mysterious stones, one red and one blue. The blue stone controls desire, and its power created the blue clan. And the red clan that inherited the power of the red stone was filled with the light of hope. Finally, the battle came to an end, and the young one who possessed the power of the blue stone fell into a deep sleep. The one with the power of the red stone flew off far across the sky. Desire and hope... until the day these two powers meet each other again...

== Characters ==
=== Main characters ===
- Papuwa: (パプワ) Papuwa is a short boy in a grass skirt. He has unparalleled strength as well as an assortment of other extraordinary abilities such as being able to breathe underwater for three hours. He was found washed up on shore of the first Papuwa Island, along with a young Chappy, by Kamui the owl, and was adopted by him. Papuwa is also, so far, the only known heir to the red stone, the stone of hope. Voiced by: Mayumi Tanaka (Japanese) in Nangoku Shōnen Papuwa-kun TV series. Voiced by: Motoko Kumai (Japanese); Monica Rial (English) for Papuwa TV series.
- Chappy: (チャッピー) Chappy is Papuwa's dog/cat and they've been together all their lives. The blue stone around Chappy's neck is actually the stone of desire, given to him by Papuwa who stole it from Shintaro early on in the first series. For the most part he is the only animal on the island who doesn't speak, however he has on few occasions using the power of the stone of desire. Voiced by: Hiroshi Masuoka (Japanese) in Nangoku Shōnen Papuwa-kun TV series. Voiced by: Kappei Yamaguchi (Japanese); Neil Cook (English) for Papuwa TV series.
- Kotaro/Rotaro: (コタロー/ロタロー) Kotaro is an effeminate young boy, even going so far as to refer to himself as "delicate", and is the strongest member of the blue clan. Because of this power he could not control, he spent most of his life locked away in his room, and for four years prior to the start of PAPUWA, was in a coma. He has the bearing of a spoiled, pampered child, and believes he is above everyone. Somewhere between waking from his coma and arriving on the island, he became amnesiac. Liquid, fearing that remembering his own name would bring back his memories and cause his power to go out of control, changed his name to Rotaro by adding a line to the kana changing "ko" to "ro". Voiced by: Ikue Ōtani (Japanese) in Nangoku Shōnen Papuwa-kun TV series. Voiced by: Sanae Kobayashi (Japanese); Luci Christian (English) for Papuwa TV series.
- Liquid: (リキッド) Liquid, who once (albeit unwillingly) served in the Genma army's elite battle unit, now lives on Papuwa Island as Papuwa's housemaid. Though he seems forced at times, and though the others don't seem to care for him much more than a maid, deep down they really do respect each other (even so far as promoting his status to "Papa" for Father's Day). Once the Shinsengumi are introduced, he is constantly hounded by Umako, the only woman on the island and quite possibly the most manliest looking character in the show. Voiced by: Hiroki Takahashi (Japanese); Jason Douglas (English) for Papuwa TV series.

=== The Guardians ===
- Jan: (ジャン) Jan is Service's best friend. He was original believed to be dead, after he was mortally wounded by Service 25 years prior to the first series. He serves as one of the three guardians of the first Papuwa Island. During his battle with Service, he reveals that the one who killed him was not Service, but Luzar.

Long ago, the Red Hisenki created two guardians to protect the red clan from the blue clan. These guardians were Jan and Shintaro. Out of the two, Jan was the first to be created. As Jan lost sense of time, months and years passed by, as he remain on the first Papuwa Island. However, he one day decided to go against his orders and left the island to take the blue clan head on, which led him to join the Ganma Army. However, his cover was blown and he was killed. It took a long time for the red hisenki to repair the damages done to Jan's body. During that time, the red hisenki decided to create a stronger force to protect it, where the red hisenki would copy Jan's soul and safely keep it inside the body of Shintaro. However, it is revealed that the copy was erased by the Blue Hisenki a long time ago, and that the Shintaro Magichad raised was just a shadow.

- Us: The guardian of the Blue Hisenki and the true antagonist of the first series. Both his name and Jan's are derived from the Roman god of gates and doorways, Janus.
- Sone the Meta-Sequoia: One of the guardians of the first Papuwa Island. Sone is a plant-like man, who watches over the Eastern Shrine. While he appears to be soft and mild-mannered, he has enough power in his sharp roots to slice his opponent in half.
- Irie: One of the guardians of the first Papuwa Island. He is a seal-like man who lives by the creek. Irie is known for his soft, voluptuous, yet powerful hips. He always make sure to set his homes up near the sea.

=== The Ganma Army (ガンマ団) ===
The Ganma Army is run by the Ganma family, who possess the power of the stone of desire. This power come in the form of what is called secret stone eyes (hisekigan, 秘石眼). The army itself works as a group of mercenaries, originally ruthless and seemingly taking control of the world, but since Shintaro's takeover the group now fights for "justice" (basically only assassinating people they believe are bad).

- Shintaro: (シンタロー) The current commander-in-chief of the Ganma army and main character of the first series, Shintaro has an unhealthy fixation on his little brother Kotaro, which makes him the butt of a lot of "brother complex" jokes. He is also the only member of the Ganma family that does not have blond hair, and the only one to not possess hisekigan, despite his blue eyes. He shares a long and rich history with the first Papuwa Island, and considers Papuwa his best friend. Despite a rather convoluted family history that involves being switched at birth and taking someone else's body, Magic refuses to consider Shintaro as anything but his son. Voiced by: Hikaru Midorikawa (Japanese) in Nangoku Shōnen Papuwa-kun TV series. Voiced by: Kōsuke Toriumi (Japanese); Jay Hickman (English) for Papuwa TV series. He is 24 in the first series. (ホワイト シンタロー)
- Magic: (マジック) Magic is Kotaro's father and former commander-in-chief of the Ganma army, and oldest of four brothers. In the four year lapse between the first and second series, he's since retired the position to his oldest son Shintaro. Out of all of the family, only he and Kotaro possess two hisekigan eyes, something which grants them immense power. Voiced by: Shō Hayami (Japanese) in Nangoku Shōnen Papuwa-kun TV series. Voiced by: Kenji Nomura (Japanese); Leo Allan (English) for Papuwa TV series.
- Luzar: (ルーザー) a.k.a. Looser: One of Magic's younger brothers, very close in age. He was killed in battle 25 years prior to Nangoku Shōnen Papuwa-kun. Harlem held a personal grudge against him, since he killed his favorite bird. After Service lost is eye, Luzar was the only person he had support from. However, the soon-to-be father Luzar went to fight at Block E and died shortly. It is later revealed that Luzar was the one responsible for killing Jan.
- Service: (サービス) The youngest Ganma brother and Harlem's twin. Unlike Magic and Harlem, Service was very fond of Luzar. Like Takamatsu, he blames Magic for Luzar's death due to the fact that they ignored him instead of stopping him from going to Block E. He was Shintaro's fighting master, and now trains Kotaro to control his hisekigan. He once lost control of the power of his hisekigan, and blamed that incident for the death of his close friend, Jan. In his anguish over this, he tore out his own right eye, which was his hisekigan. He is 43 in the first series. Voiced by: Kōsuke Meguro (Japanese) in Nangoku Shōnen Papuwa-kun TV series. Both he and Harlem are 43 in the first series.
- Gunma: (グンマ) Gunma is a scientist raised by Dr. Takamatsu. He is childish and eccentric and a bit of an airhead, and has a slight obsession with designing his inventions to look like swans. He originally thought his father was Luzar but it turned out to be Magic. He is Kotaro's only biological brother. While technically Magic's eldest son, after it was revealed that he and Shintaro were switched at birth, the idea of Gunma being next in line for commandership of the Ganma Army has never been brought up, and likely never will be, given Gunma's complete lack of interest in the matter. He is 24 in the first series. Voiced by: Kappei Yamaguchi (Japanese); Chris Patton (English) for Papuwa TV series.
- Kintaro: (キンタロー) Kintaro is the son of Luzar, and cousin to Shintaro, Gunma, and Kotaro. He is also Shintaro's "double" in an odd sense, something which dates back to the original series and involves a long and convoluted family history. While he was depicted at one point in the original series as possessing two hisekigan, at every point since, he has been shown to only have one, his left eye. Voiced by: Toshiyuki Morikawa (Japanese) in Nangoku Shōnen Papuwa-kun TV series. Voiced by: Kentaro Ito (Japanese); Robert Kraft (English) for Papuwa TV series.
- Doctor Takamatsu: (ドクター高松) Takamatsu was Luzar's student, and the one who primarily raised Gunma. Takamatsu (along with Servis) blamed Magic for Luzar's death (since Magic was leader of the army then and sent Luzar out to battle), so as revenge he switched babies Shintaro and Gunma (Gunma being Magic's son and Shintaro being Luzar's son, who were born just a few days apart) so that Magic's "heir" would not be who he thought. Takamatsu specializes in the field of biotechnology, but is also a proficient medical doctor. Voiced by: Katsuhiro Harasawa (Japanese); Xero Reynolds (English) for Papuwa TV series. He is 43 in the first series.
- Gionkamen Arashiyama: (祗園仮面アラシヤマ) One of Ganma's elite forces (and second only to Shintaro, he claims), Arashiyama is a shy person whose greatest dream is just to make friends, which he fails to do because of his lack of confidence and bad "wisdom" from his former teacher Marker. Arashiyama especially wants to make friends with Shintaro, who was the first person to talk to him at the Ganma Academy, and the first person to offer to be his friend. However, Shintaro's offer to be his friend in the original series was born of desperation, when he needed the help of someone sufficiently strong to put up a fight against his uncle, Servis, and Shintaro typically prefers to ignore his existence entirely. Arashiyama is a highly proficient flame master, and ranks among the most powerful members of the Ganma army not related to the Blue Clan. Voiced by: Yoku Shioya (Japanese) in Nangoku Shōnen Papuwa-kun TV series. Voiced by: Kōji Yusa (Japanese); Vic Mignogna (English) for Papuwa TV series.
- Ninja Tottori: (忍者トットリ) Tottori, as his name states, is a ninja, but not a very good one. His special "attack" is kicking his sandal into the air and whatever side it lands on activates a cloud that will attack the enemy with whatever weather he predicts. Some episodes suggest he may have feelings for Miyagi, but this is probably just a running gag. Voiced by: Takayuki Ayanogi (Japanese) in Nangoku Shōnen Papuwa-kun TV series. Voiced by: Katashi Ishizuka (Japanese); Illich Guardiola (English) for Papuwa TV series.
- Tōhoku Miyagi: (東北ミヤギ) In the dub, Miyagi is portrayed as a stereotypical dumb blond. And when it comes to common sense, he is a little bit lacking. But he's also a good strategist and has mastered written Chinese. He has to, because his weapon of choice (Ikijibiki no Fude, 生き字引の筆, lit. "Walking Dictionary Writing Brush", "Brush of Literalization" in the dub) is an oversized calligraphy brush that turns anything into whatever is written on it, but only works using Chinese characters. He and Tottori are best friends. Voiced by: Bin Shimada (Japanese) in Nangoku Shōnen Papuwa-kun TV series. Voiced by: Daisuke Hirakawa (Japanese); Andrew Love (English) for Papuwa TV series.
- Musha Kōji: (武者コージ) When Kōji was 3 years old he fell into a pond and was eaten by a koi fish named Kinugasa. Kinugasa was then caught and sold to a rich couple who found and adopted him. Kouji entered baseball during high school and was scouted that way for the Ganma's army. He is Umako's older brother. Voiced by: Eiji Takemoto (Japanese); Matt Culpepper (English) for Papuwa TV series.
- Hakata "Donnie" Donta: Voiced by: Masao Harada (Japanese); Paul Locklear (English) for Papuwa TV series.
- Nagoya Willow: (名古屋ウィロー) Voiced by: Katsumi Suzuki (Japanese) in Nangoku Shōnen Papuwa-kun TV series. Voiced by: Takahiro Mizushima (Japanese); Mark X. Laskowski (English) for Papuwa TV series.
- Tiramisu and Chocolate Romance: (ティラミス&チョコレートロマンス) Two member of the Ganma Army.

Tiramisu is voiced by Masao Harada in Japanese and Paul Oddo in English. and Chocolate Romance is voiced by Kota Nemoto in Japanese and K.C. Jones in English. both for Papuwa TV series.

- Tsugaru Jocker: (津軽ジョッカー) Voiced by: Uncredited (Japanese); Shannon Emerick (English) for Papuwa TV series.

==== Special Battle Unit ====
- Harlem (ハーレム): Another of Magic's brothers, and older twin brother of Service. He is the exact opposite of his twin. He leads the Special Battle Unit consisting of Marker, Rod, and G, which Shintaro disbanded when he gained control. He likes to steal money from his subordinates and waste it on gambling. Despite his outward appearance, Harlem is sensitive to the happenings around him, and still looks out for his ex-team member Liquid. He has one hisekigan eye. Voiced by: Hirotaka Suzuoki (Japanese) in Nangoku Shōnen Papuwa-kun TV series. Voiced by: Takehito Koyasu (Japanese); Mike MacRae (English) for Papuwa TV series. Both he and Service are 43 in the first series.
- Marker: (マーカー) Marker is a Chinese warrior, very calm and composed. He is especially skilled with a sword, and manipulates fire. He was Arashiyama's former teacher, and instilled in him the impression that he is the best and that everyone else is worthless. This default he falls back on is why Arashiyama can never make friends. Marker is a member of Harlem's Special Battle Unit. His special attack is Flame Serpent. Voiced by: Katsuyuki Konishi (Japanese); Ty Mahany (English) for Papuwa TV series.
- Rod: (ロッド) Rod is an Italian with a habit for bad jokes. Always cheery, he has the power to manipulate wind. He is a member of Harlem's Special Battle Unit. Voiced by: Yoshikazu Nagano (Japanese); Rob Mungle (English) for Papuwa TV series.
- G: (ジー) G is of German descent with an odd fondness for bears, and Hokkaidou wood carvings. He is quiet and a bit shy, and often does without speaking. He is a member of Harlem's Special Battle Unit. His actual name is Gustav. Voiced by: Kenji Nomura (Japanese); Rick Piersall (English) for Papuwa TV series.

=== The Shinsengumi ===
(心戦組) The Shinsengumi is a mercenary group (based the real life historical group) that consists of multiple branches, two of which are known; the "Main" group and the "True" group.

==== Main Shinsengumi ====
(Shinsengumi Hontai, 心戦組本隊)

Isami Kondō (近藤イサミ) Voiced by: Hidenari Ugaki (Japanese); George Manley (English) for Papuwa TV series.
Toshizō Hijikata (土方トシゾー) Voiced by: Toru Okawa (Japanese); Mike McFarland (English) for Papuwa TV series. The straight-man of the team.
Sōji Okita (沖田ソージ) Voiced by: Showtaro Morikubo (Japanese); Brandon Scott Peters (English) for Papuwa TV series. a smiling silver-haired man. He unfortunately has Kondo's affections, and returns them by repeatedly stabbing Kondo with his sword.
Umako Harada (原田ウマ子) Voiced by: Kōji Ishii (Japanese); Joanne Bonasso (English) for Papuwa TV series. The most masculine character and ironically, the only major female character. She is tall, muscular, battle-scarred, and eventually develops a beard due to a potion. She falls in love with Liquid to his Horror. She is Koji's younger sister.

==== True Shinsengumi ====
(Shin Shinsengumi, 真心戦組) <Manga only>

Yamanami Keisuke (山南ケースケ)
Yamazaki Susumu (山崎ススム)
Itou Kashitaro (伊東カシタロー)
Saitou Hajime (斎藤ハジメ)
Nagakura Shinpachi (永倉シンパチ)

=== The Namamonos ===
A namamono (ナマモノ) is a strange talking animal-type creature that lives on Papuwa Island. There are countless namamonos that appear throughout the series.

- Tanno and Itō: (タンノ&イトウ) Tanno is a transvestite fish who wears fishnet stockings, and Itō is a hermaphroditic pink snail. In the dub they talk like stereotypical gay men. Usually seen together, they are both currently obsessed with Toshizou and pounce on him vehemently on sight. Itō also constantly spawns baby snails which the rest of the cast continuously eat. Tanno is voiced by Tomohiro Nishimura (Japanese) and Itō is voiced by Tesshō Genda (Japanese) in Nangoku Shōnen Papuwa-kun TV series. Tanno is voiced by Masaya Takatsuka in Japanese and Eric Opella in English. and Itō is voiced by Mugihito in Japanese and Paul Sidello in English. for Papuwa TV series.
- Komoro: (コモロ) Komoro is a poisonous mushroom who tries to pass himself off as a safely edible mushroom. He appears at random and can appear to be an annoyance to Papuwa and the others. When breathed in, his poisonous powder is hallucinogenic. Voiced by: Takehito Koyasu (Japanese); John Tyson (English) for Papuwa TV series.
- Oshōdani the Sea Otter: (オショウダニ) Oshodani is a sea otter who is searching for the "perfect drum". With an obsession for beating on anything he can find, he always carries with him a pair of drumsticks. He attacks by throwing his drum sticks. Voiced by: Eiji Takemoto (Japanese); Chris Ayres (English) for Papuwa TV series.
- Eguchi and Nakamura: (エグチ&ナカムラ) A kangaroo mouse and a badger who are very close friends and always seen together. They give off the resemblance of a rabbit and a raccoon, and seem to enjoy scratching new things with a 10 yen coin. Eguchi is voiced by Atsuko Bungo in Japanese and Tiffany Grant in English. and Nakamura is voiced by Akiko Kurumado in Japanese and Jessica Boone in English. for Papuwa TV series.
- Hayashi: (ハヤシ) A pink Tyrannosaurus rex who became a transvestite by eating Itō's children. His tail is frequently used as food. Voiced by: Daisuke Hirakawa (Japanese); Paul Hope (English) for Papuwa TV series.
- Yamagishi: (ヤマギシ) Yamagishi is a wombat who constantly dreams of "a sea of stars". He has a naturally gloomy disposition. Voiced by: Katashi Ishizuka (Japanese); Duc Nguyen (English) for Papuwa TV series.
- Hanaji Buusuke: (鼻血ブースケ) Buusuke are huge "leaf beetles", who look like purple dinosaur creatures with fairy wings wearing a bathing suit. Buusuke live in the Cocoa Forest, and have chronic nosebleeds due to the copious amounts of cocoa that they eat. This also causes them be to anemic.
- Shimizu: (シミズ) A huge earthworm who's very affectionate. Despite being introduced early on, he has a very small role in the series. Voiced by: Kota Nemoto (Japanese); Christopher King (English) for Papuwa TV series.
- Kubota: (クボタ) A large bird that is used as a means of transportation around the island. The cast commonly steals Kubota's eggs for food or other such useful purposes. Voiced by: Uncredited (Japanese); K.C. Jones (English) for Papuwa TV series.
- Tezuka: (テヅカ) A bat who practices magic to make medicine. He became close friends with Arashiyama on the first Papuwa Island, of which he has completely forgotten. Tezuka was also an apprentice to Nagoya Willow. Voiced by: Showtaro Morikubo (Japanese); Blake Shepard (English) for Papuwa TV series.
- Takeuchi: (タケウチ) A chihuahua, and Tezuka's assistant. He acts nice to hide malicious intent and uses his cute appearance to swindle people. Voiced by: Kei Kobayashi (Japanese); Leraldo Anzaldua (English) for Papuwa TV series.
- Taco Taguchi and Takeda: (タグチ&タケダ) A chupacabra and an alien, who often come to brainwash Liquid. Taco Taguchi is voiced by Uncredited in Japanese and Roberto Garcia in English. and Takeda is voiced by Kota Nemoto in Japanese and K.C. Jones in English. for Papuwa TV series.
- Umigishi: (ウミギシ) Umigishi is a half man, half octopus/squid character. A long time ago he was engaged to Tanno, but later married Ifuku. He later returns during the Man's Festival in the second series. Voiced by: Yasunori Matsumoto (Japanese) in Nangoku Shōnen Papuwa-kun TV series. Voiced by: Showtaro Morikubo (Japanese); John Swasey (English) for Papuwa TV series.
- Ifuku: (イフク) A talking clam and Umigishi's wife. She has much faith in her bumbling husband and often gives him advice. Voiced by: Akari Hibino (Japanese); Marcy Bannor (English) for Papuwa TV series.
- Kaori: The crabfish beautician of Papuwa island.
- Miyamo:
- Kamui the Owl: Papuwa's adoptive grandfather who is deceased prior to the first series. He is the one who first informs Shintaro of the sinking of the first Papuwa Island and Papuwa's past. He appears again in the second series during the second Obon Festival. Voiced by: Mugihito (Japanese); Marty Fleck (English) for Papuwa TV series.
- Yopparaida the Hanami Monster: (ヨッパライダー) Yopparaida is the ancient protector of the first Papuwa Island and the god of the sea. He appears once a year during the Hanami season to celebrate with the island residents.
- Nagarakawa the Cormorant:
- Katami-kun & Fukuda-kun:
- Mokkun:
- Okkun:
- Osaka:
- Tama-chan: Osaka's daughter.
- Nakai:
- Nakai Jr.: (ナカイJr) Voiced by: Uncredited (Japanese); John Swasey (English) for Papuwa TV series.
- Mosa the Mosasaurus: Voiced by: Uncredited (Japanese); John Swasey (English) for Papuwa TV series.
- Great Man-God: (男児主さま) Voiced by: Yoshikazu Nagano (Japanese); Mark X. Laskowski (English) for Papuwa TV series.
- Man-Octopus: (蛸男児) Voiced by: Uncredited (Japanese); K.C. Jones (English) for Papuwa TV series.
- Hoshino: Voiced by: Uncredited (Japanese); John Swasey (English) for Papuwa TV series.
- Kimura: (キムラ)
- Fuji: Voiced by: Uncredited (Japanese); Uncredited (English) for Papuwa TV series.
- Cocoa Queen: A giant cocoa plant. Voiced by: Keiko Mizutani (Japanese); Jessica Boone (English) for Papuwa TV series.
- Sekino the Giant Panda: (セキノ) Voiced by: Toru Okawa (Japanese); David Born (English) for Papuwa TV series.
- Hiroshi: (ヒロシ) Hiroshi is a member of the bat tribe on the "drifting island" (Tadayoijima). Due to a birth defect type mutation, he looks like a human while the rest of his people look like little balls with bat wings. He is thus referred to as a "Happy Child".
- Hiroshi's Father: (ヒロシのパパ)
- Nobuo: (ノブオ)
- Soni (ソニ)
- Maziro': (マジロ)
- Morishige (モリシゲ)
- Kagerouzoku (カゲロウ族)
- Kera: (ケラ) From the island of "Beginning's End" (Hajimari no Owari), Kera is a Happy Child of a race of dinosaurs. She's looking for her parents who she was separated from. She only appears in the manga.
- Kashio: (カシオ)
- Chataro: (チャタロー)
- Charmy: (チャーミー)
- Gama Sennin: (ガマ仙人)

=== Other Miscellaneous Characters ===
- Tonkotsumaru: Hakata Donta's pet pig. He is the one who makes the Tonkotsu Ramen to power him up.
- Kinugasa: Voiced by: Uncredited (Japanese); Eddie Shannon Jr. (English) for Papuwa TV series.
- Kuriko: (クリ子) Kuriko is Santa's daughter and apprentice (literally a Santa Claus in training). A long time ago she and Papuwa made a promise that if she could grow to be 156 cm, they would get married.

=== Video Game-Exclusive Characters ===
- Umbrella Boot
- Daruma
- Gunma Doll
- Ashura
- Pork Chop
- Tamasaburo

== Media ==
=== Anime ===
Nangoku Shōnen Papuwa-kun was adapted into a 42-episode anime television series in 1992. Produced by Nippon Animation under the direction of Jun Takagi, the series began its broadcast run on TV Asahi from 10 October 1992 to 2 October 1993. Three pieces of theme music were used for the opening and closing of each episode. The opening theme is "Npapa Love Song" (んばば・ラブソング) performed by Tome. The closing themes are "Shikasutto Nonsense" (しかすっとナンセンス) performed by Daiji Man Brothers Band for the first 24 episodes and "Kibun wa Papuwa Hare" (気分はパプワ晴れ) performed by Kouji Tsuno and Pythagoras for the remaining episodes.

The second manga series was also adapted into an anime television series by Nippon Animation. Directed by Kenichi Nishida, the second series began its broadcast run on TV Tokyo from 30 September 2003 to 30 March 2004. Two pieces of theme music are used, one opening and one closing. The opening theme is "Tabibito" (旅人) performed by Loosely, and the closing them is "Yurari Yurari (ゆらりゆらり) performed by Masashi Iino (いいのまさし, Iino Masashi).

=== Video games ===
Two video games entitled Nankoku Shōnen Papuwa-kun (南国少年パプワくん) were released on March 25, 1994, by Enix for the Nintendo's Game Boy and Super Famicom.

== Episode list ==
=== Papuwa-kun ===
1. Nbaba! From Today Onwards, You're My Friend Too! (んばば!きょうからお前も友達だ)
2. Get To Work, Shintaro! Food Is a Matter of Life and Death. (働けシンタロー!食事は命がけだ)
3. Brush of Literalization! Miyagi Touhoku Appears (生き字引きの筆! 東北ミヤギ登場)
4. Welcome Back, Grandpa! Papuwa's Secret (お帰りじぃちゃ! パプワの秘密)
5. The Carefree Ninja, Tottori Arrives (脳天気野郎 忍者トットリくん参上)
6. パプワ島の ふしぎな仲間全員集合
7. Ton-kotsu Power! Hakata Donta Appears (トン骨パワー! 博多どん太君登場)
8. It's A Big Battle! Guardian of Papuwa Forest (大決戦だぞ!パプワの森の守り神)
9. Merry Christmas! Papuwa Island Christmas Eve (メリークリスマス! パプワ島聖夜)
10. 爆裂!炎のアラシヤマ おたべ攻撃
11. Revival! Miyagi & Tottori's Double Attack (復活! ミヤギ・トットリのW攻撃)
12. 危機一髪! 記憶をのぞく秘密兵器
13. 探検! パプワ島地底に謎のトビラ
14. Shintaro's Dad? Commander Magic (シンタローのパパ? マジック総帥)
15. Strange Play Showdown! Koshien Baseball Assassin (珍プレー対決! 刺客甲子園球児だ)
16. Assassin Kouji Musha & Kinugasa-kun (刺客武者のコージ& キヌガサくん)
17. Aim for the Wish-Granting Bamboo (めざせ! 願いを叶えるイッポン竹)
18. The Strongest in History! Prof. Gunma & Robot (史上最強! グンマ博士&ロボット)
19. The Terror of the Squid Man! Love's Raging Storm (イカ男の恐怖! 吹き荒れる愛の嵐)
20. ハチャメチャ! パプワ島大運動会
21. The Battle for the Secret Stone! A Dream Showdown Between Four Warriors (秘石争奪戦! 4人の戦士夢の対決)
22. Mayhem! Spring Pic-Pic-Picnic (大騒動! 春のぴきぴきピクニック)
23. Hanami Monster Yopparaida's Appearance (お花見怪獣 ヨッパライダー出現!)
24. Parenting Chappy! Polar Bear-kun Story (子育てチャッピー! 白熊くん物語)
25. Return! The Genius "Dr. Gunma"'s New Robot (再上陸! 天才グンマ博士の新ロボ)
26. Invincible to Nice! Doctor Takamatsu's Appearance (ステキに無敵! ドクター高松登場)
27. 南国温泉の戦い! 地獄温泉別府丸
28. Shintaro's Birthday! Papa Returns (シンタローの誕生日!パパ再登場)
29. Farewell Papuwa Island! Shintaro's Escape (さらばパプワ島! シンタロー脱出)
30. Hypnotist! Meet Jocker Tsugaru! (催眠術師! 津軽ジョッカー見参!)
31. Willow Assassin! The Wizard of Nagoya (刺客ウイロー! 名古屋の魔法使い)
32. Superhuman Papuwa! Rampage at the Traveling Amusement Park (超人パプワ! 移動遊園地で大暴れ)
33. Squid Man Umigishi's Tears! Tanno's Secret (イカ男ウミギシ涙! タンノの秘密)
34. 狙われた秘石! 日光猿王とタロー
35. Mirror of the Past: The Mystery of the Magic Family (過去を映す鏡! マジック一族の謎)
36. Mysterious Service! The Man Who Gave Up His Secret Stone Eye (謎のサービス! 秘石眼を捨てた男)
37. Service Landing! Shintaro's Secret Plan (サービス上陸! シンタローの秘策)
38. Showdown! Four Warriors vs. Invincible Service (対決!四人の戦士VS 無敵サービス)
39. パプワ島大騒動!オバケが出たぞ
40. ヒグラシの夢! あの空を飛びたい
41. Who's the President! General Election on Papua Island (大統領は誰だ! パプワ島の総選挙)
42. Goodbye Papuwa Island! We're All Friends (さよならパプワ島! みんな友達だ)

=== Papuwa ===
1. Welcome to Papuwa Island!
2. Caution: Extremely Poisonous? Here Comes Komoro the Destroying Angel Mushroom
3. My Personal Motto is the Power of Friendship. I am Arashimaya
4. Here Comes the Wandering Drummer, Oshōdani the Sea Otter
5. Fancy Yankee?! Liquid's Fabulous Past
6. Even the Zombies Dance?! The Obon Festival on Papuwa Island is Wild and Crazy
7. Deadly Technique! The Brush of Literalization Turns Even Hayashi Pale?!
8. Rotaro Awakens?! Massive Flood in Papuwa's House
9. Here Come the Samurai! Meet the Shinsengumi!!
10. Umako Vision Activated!! Magical Potion Taste Like Love
11. Save Rotaro! Chappy the Errand Boy!
12. Who's the Empress? Fierce! Papuwa Island Hina-King Cup
13. Skin Tight!? Men's Beach Volleyball Competition
14. Kotaro is Stunned!? Here Comes the Super Manly God of the Man Festival!
15. Watch Out for the Fake? Rotaro in the Test of Courageous Manhood
16. What's the Present? Papa Liquid's Longest Day
17. Melancholy Kōji Who Does Umako Belong To?
18. No Need for Liquid? Substitute Maid Championship
19. Catch My Heart!! Sizzling Valentine's Day
20. Arashiyama Reminisces! Unforgettable Ganma Army Military Academy
21. What's Your Wish? Star Festival on Papuwa Island
22. Climb, Liquid! Hang the Charms for Your Life?
23. He's Finally Here!! Shintaro Returns
24. Shintaro & Liquid: Their Own Decisions
25. Save Papuwa Island! Kotaro's Fateful Ganma Cannon
26. Goodbye, Kotaro! You Are My Friend from this Day Forth!

== See also ==
- List of Square Enix video game franchises
