= Eden's Bowy =

Japanese manga series

- Jorrne (back) and Elisis (front), on the cover of a special issue

エデンズ ボゥイ (Edenzu Bui)
- Manga
- Written by: Kitsune Tennouji
- Published by: Kadokawa Shoten
- Magazine: Comptiq → Shōnen Ace
- Original run: January 1994 – November 2009
- Volumes: 20
- Anime television series
- Directed by: Tsukasa Sunaga
- Music by: Kazuhiko Toyama
- Studio: Studio Deen
- Licensed by: UK: ADV Films
- Original network: TV Tokyo
- Original run: April 6, 1999 – September 28, 1999
- Episodes: 26

Eden's Bowy (Japanese: ヱデンズ ボゥイ, Hepburn: Wedenzu Bui) is a Japanese manga series written and illustrated by Kitsune Tennouji. It was originally published in the magazine Comptiq in 1994, but it moved to Shōnen Ace in 1996. It was adapted into a 26-episode animated series by Studio Deen in 1999.

== Plot ==
=== Comic version ===
After human civilization were destroyed and rebuilt for several times, the world was now a place where three floating continents: Yulgaha, Yanuess, and Urt, move slowly through the sky. People living on the ground referred those floating lands as "Ëdens". Yorn, a boy born to Yoniha the Foreseeing Maiden on Yulgaha, was separated from his mother and brought to live on the surface when he was five years old. He was then adopted by Gastini, a former swordsman now a farmer, and raised along with Gastini's three sons: Moes, Miel, and their younger brother.

Ten years later, Yulgaha sent Witto and Hairra to investigate Yorn, as the boy who turned out to be a "God Killer". They met a mysterious swordsman, later known as "Old Man" (Oyaji) by Yorn, and headed to Gastini's farm. Meanwhile, Yorn encountered Elisiss, a mysterious girl who fell from the sky, and hid her in his workshop.

A while later, Yorn had a physical fight with Moes and Miel. The fight ended up both Yorn and Miel hurt while Moes ran away. Both Yorn and Miel were healed by Elisiss, while Moes were killed by Hairra and transformed into a puppet. Hairra and Witto's Claymen then attacked on Gastini's house, killing him.

Upon returning home, Yorn and Miel were attacked by Hairra and Claymen. Yorn's sword was broken by a Clayman, but Elisiss managed to fix and upgrade the sword. After defeating Claymen with his sword, Yorn had to battle Old Man. When observing the battle, Hairra recognized the Old Man was in fact Ulgar Dyne, a swordsman who won his place to live in Yulgaha but escaped years ago, and decided to kill both Yorn and Ulgar. Seeda, another mysterious girl, intervened and saved them both. Seeda and Ulgar managed defeated Hairra and reanimated Moes respectively before Hairra escaped.

After the battle, Seeda told Yorn had to begin a journey. Before leaving, Yorn learned from Ulgar that there was a tournament, which held every ten years and granted the champion to live in Ëdens. In order to return to Yulgaha and reunite with his mother, Yorn decided to fight in the tournament, which would be held three years later, while Ulgar agreed to train him during the journey.

=== Anime version ===
The story is set in a world where two floating islands named Yulgaha and Yanuess slowly move through the sky. The people on the ground named these islands "Ëdens", and they control all the land. A boy, Yorn, was born on Yulgaha, but in his infancy, he was separated from his mother and brought to live on the surface. Although the foster father that raised him was poor, Yorn grew into a bright, chipper young man.

One day, Yorn is attacked by Hairra, a woman who is later revealed to be a puppet from Yulgaha, while he is forging a sword. When she breaks the sword and attempts to kill him, his father sacrifices himself to save Yorn. Hairra proceeds to incapacitate Yorn, but is prevented from killing him by the arrival of a mysterious young girl. The girl picks up the hilt of Yorn's sword and drives it into her hand, magically transforming it into the sword of the God hunter.

Hairra attempts to kill her, but she transforms into a young woman armed with a staff (Seeda) and fights back. During this battle, Yorn's powers as a God-Hunter are awakened by the sword and he enters the battle. Using a massive energy blast emanating from the sword, he drives off Hairra and her brother. During the interim, the mysterious girl disappears. She rejoins him later when both are caught by the Chosen of Yulgaha for drinking from a desert oasis that was sacred to Yulgaha, and after a series of events they and the old man Yorn met after the conflict with Hairra set off for Rubeet.

They come to a village that is being attacked by a white leopard. The young girl wanders off into the forest after a dance that told the story of the God Hunter. Searching for her, Yorn, the old man and some of the villagers go into the forest to search for her. They find her (caught in a trap that had been meant for the leopard), but shortly after that the white leopard attacks. It attacks the village chief but is driven off by the old man. It finds Yorn and the young girl, but does not attack. The young girl follows it, and when Yorn gets back the strength to search for her, he overhears her talking to someone. As he follows the voice of the girl to its source, he finds her name is Elisiss. When he finds her, it turns out that she had been talking to the leopard. He puts himself between the two, but Elisiss then puts herself between him and the leopard, protecting it. Shortly after that, the leopard is attacked by someone who looks similar to Yorn. Elisiss again interposes herself between the leopard and its assailant, but he is only stopped when Yorn parries his blade. He is stronger than Yorn, however, and knocks his sword out of his hands and to the ground. He spares Yorn however, and introduces himself as Spike Randit, another God Hunter, before leaving.

While Yorn is trying reconcile the fact that he is a God Hunter with himself, not quite able to believe it, Elisiss licks his wound. This somehow heals it, and prompts a bit of teasing from the old man. Afterwards, when the talk turns to the white leopard, Elisiss tells them it is her sister and will not be seen in the forest again.

They then leave to continue their journey.

== Characters ==
Yorn

- Voiced by: Kappei Yamaguchi (Japanese); John Minnich (English)

Yorn, the main protagonist, is a God Hunter, one with the power to kill gods. He lived as a farm boy until Hairra and Weto's attack. When he first saw Elisiss in the market, he fell for her. He doesn't fight too much, mostly because the old man won't let him. This irritates Yorn to no end. He wants to meet his mother, but above all he wants to protect Elisiss and spend the rest of his life with her. There is a certain irony to this, for reasons that will be explained. He initially admires Yulgaha and wants to go up to it, and it takes a great deal to prove to him how evil they truly are. He and Spike Randit do not get along, as Spike feels that there can only be one God Hunter, a view not shared by Yorn. He found out that Seeda and Elisiss were the same person, and later that she was also a god. Yorn accepts this when he learns it. His reaction to learning she and Seeda are one and the same, on the other hand, is rather different. He found hard to reconcile initially, but he accepted it in the end. Yorn feels that just because he is a God Hunter, that does not mean that he will be forced to kill Elisiss, and even if it is natural law, he will break it to keep her. He seems to be symbolized by a white lily.
Elisiss / Seeda

- Voiced by: Hekiru Shiina (Japanese); Camille Chen (English)

Elisiss is a mysterious young girl who showed up out of nowhere in the market of Coacassa one day. She almost never talks about her past. She is fond of Yorn, and comes to love him. She protects Yorn and would do so no matter what. She also seems to be symbolized by a white lily (in fact, the second episode is titled "White Flowers of Coacassa"), which she was given when she and Yorn first saw each other in the market. She is able to use powerful magic, especially when she transforms into Seeda (Jsieda in the manga). When she was in her normal form, she used her magic to fix Yorn's broken sword and transformed it into the sword of the God Hunter. As Seeda, she is not only a powerful mage but can also use her staff as a pole arm. The pendant she wears on her neck is what enables her to transform into Seeda. She also has a third form, which is her true form (or at least the closest to it). In this form she gains white wings. She uses it at least twice, once to follow Yorn and once to save him. As Seeda, she is very up front and business like, and at times seems to enjoy combat. As Elisiss, she is a much more gentle individual and is much quieter. As both, however, she shows compassion for those suffering. That she and Yorn love each other is quite ironic, as Elisiss is actually a God herself. In fact, she flew down from heaven just to meet him. At the time she felt it was just to protect him, but she admitted her feelings eventually. Along with Seeda, she's implied to have other separate forms with their own personality. In particular, Yorn's mother is implied to be one of these forms at the end of the manga. This particularly upsets Yorn as they'd consummated their relationship before this revelation. In the manga, rather than meet him in the market, Elisiss falls straight from Eden and crashes into Yorn's house. She is also more open and clingy in the manga: she heals other people by extending her hands above them, but for Yorn she licks his wounds.
Enefea (The white leopard)

- Voiced by: Rei Igarashi (Japanese); Carla Witt (English)

Enefea is Elisiss's sister, and is the white leopard. Like Elisiss, she is also a god. She was punished by being cursed with the form of the leopard and cast down from heaven by their own father, Rumezavia, whom she angered by siding with humans. Even after all this, she is thoroughly devoted to making sure that her sister is safe. Anyone, no matter who or where they are, who attempts to harm Elisiss feels the wrath of Enefea. She is still capable of speech, and uses it to speak with Elisiss. She has an innate distrust of Yorn, as he is a God Hunter. She fights with the teeth and claws of her leopard form, but is also capable of producing powerful magic blasts from between her eyes. She eventually follows Spike to ensure he won't harm Elisiss. She would have killed him for trying to do so once, but wasn't able to after hearing Spike's tragic story.
Old Man (Ulgar Dyne/Oyazi)

- Voiced by: Masashi Sugawara (Japanese); Steve Sanders (eps. 1–17);Shackleford Jansen (eps. 18–26) (English)

The old man rescued Yorn's mother, the princess of foresight, from Yulgaha at the very beginning of the series. Whenever Elisiss and Yorn are close, he teases them about it. He is an accomplished swordsman and is Yorn's guide on his journey. He seems to know a lot about stuff from Yulgaha and how to operate it. He also happens to despise Yulgaha and the people who live up there, since, among other things, they drain people's souls and use them to power the city.
Spike Randit

- Voiced by: Yūji Ueda (Japanese); Josh Meyer (English)

Spike Randit is another God Hunter, and appears to be meant as Yorn's dark counterpart. He looks similar to Yorn, with several differences. The first and most obvious difference are the four scars on his jawbone. There are two on each side, perfectly parallel to each other. He is also dressed in black as opposed to white, with red visible in some areas. His sword is also the sword of the god hunter, and they have somewhat similar hair. The main difference is that his hair is somewhat flatter. He feels that a God Hunter has no choice but to kill a god, a view that is not shared by Yorn. He calls it a law of nature, an unstoppable instinct. He feels it's his destiny to be the one true God Hunter. He is constantly challenging Yorn, attempting to force Yorn to fight him or provoke Yorn into doing so. He challenges the truth of Yorn's being the true God Hunter, saying that if he was, he wouldn't be traveling with Elisiss and would kill her - something Yorn absolutely refuses to do, no matter what.
