= Katashi Ishizuka =

Japanese voice actor

Katashi Ishizuka (石塚堅, Ishizuka Katashi; born September 22, 1970, in Osaka) is a Japanese voice actor.

== Notable anime and video game voice roles ==
- Ryu in Street Fighter Zero, Street Fighter Zero 2, Street Fighter EX series
- Dan Hibiki in Street Fighter Zero
- Yamada in Revolutionary Girl Utena
- Milluki Zoldyck in Hunter × Hunter (1999)
- Arias in Read or Die
- Koji Mori in Strawberry Eggs
- Tamanian Kid in Beast Wars Second
- Masatsugu in Grander Musashi RV
- Rodrigo in Hungry Heart: Wild Striker
- Ninja Tottori and Yamagishi in Papuwa
- Protagonist in Revelations: Persona
