= YAT Anshin! Uchū Ryokō =

Japanese anime television series

YAT安心!宇宙旅行 (Yatto Anshin! Uchū Ryokō)
- Anime television series
- Directed by: Hitoshi Nanba
- Music by: Kenji Kawai
- Studio: Group TAC
- Original network: NHK
- Original run: October 5, 1996 – October 3, 1998
- Episodes: 75
- icon

YAT Untroubled Space Tours (YAT安心!宇宙旅行, Yatto Anshin! Uchū Ryokō) is an anime series produced by Group TAC.

It aired on NHK in Japan from October 1996 to September 1997; a second series aired from April to October 1998.

== Plot ==
The series is set in the year 5808; human civilization has taken gigantic steps in the conquest of the space, and with the creation of the three-dimensional tunnel, people can travel to any Galaxy in the universe. "The Gentleman of the Cosmos" is a company that manages the tunnel and has come to dominate the tourism industry.

The main characters of the series are part of Yamamoto Anshin Travel (YAT), with the plot revolving around Goro Hoshiwatari, an adolescent who has left his home to travel by the space and to find the whereabouts of his father, who disappeared fifteen years ago during the explosion of the main transporting center of the three-dimensional Tunnel that he created. Goro falls in love with Katsura, the commander's daughter; and becomes the YAT mechanic/janitor after an accident that he was responsible for, so he tags along to pay for the damage and to find his father as well. Finding his father turns out not to be his only problem, since Kanea, a young lady whose mother is the owner of "the Gentleman of the Cosmos", is in love with him. In addition, Kanea's mother had a mysterious and conflicting past with Yamamoto.

The second series takes place six months after the first. YAT ships and crew are transported to a very far universe. They soon discover that the person responsible is Professor Nota, a scientific who is working on a teletransportation device, helped by a cat-like girl with psychic powers called "Pinky". Then, Emperor Ganon kidnaps the professor, who wants to use the device to rule the universe. The aim of the YAT crew is finding the kidnapped professor and going back to Earth.

== Characters ==
=== Main ===
- Goro Hoshiwatari (星渡 ゴロー, Hoshiwatari Gorō): Protagonist of the series. He works in YAT to clear off damage costs he had inadvertently caused for the company. Like many shounen heroes, Goro is very brave and has an innate sense of righteousness, along with his longstanding goal of searching for his missing father. He is bossed around by Kaoru for the majority of the series, while he has a deep crush on his daughter Katsura. Voiced by: Motoko Kumai
- Katsura Tenjoin (天上院 桂, Tenjōin Katsura): Kaoru's adopted daughter. She is sweet and affectionate, but she possesses superhuman strength which allows her to lift 100 tonnes of heavy objects easily even only one hand is used. Also she instinctively defends herself with martial arts whenever she feels she is in danger. She is a cheerful girl all around and it often rubs off on other people, regardless of their mood. She has some unique paranormal abilities (especially her immeasurable super strength) that complement her skills in fighting. Voiced by: Hekiru Shiina
- Kaoru Yamamoto (ヤマモト カオル, Yamamoto Kaoru): Director of YAT and captain of the YAT Dove. Considered an old wolf of space, he was a pirate who was feared by all until he retired. He is very ambitious and egoistic, and organizes trips to cheap destinations. Despite his grumpy personality, he has a good heart. He devotes much of his life to his beloved daughter Katsura. Voiced by: Kiyoyuki Yanada
- Ucchi (ウッチー, Utchī): The Pilot of the YAT ship who dreams about having his own ride. Although a sensible person, he is easily depressed. He has the ability to change his appearance or impersonate people, regardless of their gender. He has solved problems for Goro and Katsura, which reflects his good side. Voiced by: Katsumi Suzuki
- Kanabi (カナビー, Kanabī): The navigator of the YAT ship. Although the tours rely on his skills, the ship sometimes arrives at unexpected destinations. While clearly a robot, he has displayed various emotions, although much of it in seemingly pointless arguments with Ucchi. Voiced by: Kappei Yamaguchi
- Bukki (ブッキー, Bukkī): Mascot of the company and apparently Katsura's pet lizard, although many people are scared of its mean appearance. Voiced by: Yūko Mita

=== Captain Rock's crew ===
- Captain Rock (キャプテン・ロック Kyaputen Rokku): Leader of the pirates. When he appears, he always sings the same song with the rest of his crew. Long ago, he was part of Yamamoto crew and he is still in Yamamoto's old ship, Nevermore. He is a parody of Captain Harlock. Voiced by: Kazuki Yao
- Nanako (ナナコ): Pirate crewmember. She plays electric guitar and is very good at controlling computers on Nevermore. She was also, part of Yamamoto crew in the past. She married with Hacibee later in the series. She is a parody of Yuki in the Captain Harlock series. Voiced by: Yūko Nagashima
- Hachibee (ハチベー Hachibē): Pirate crewmember. He plays a digital piano. He loves mechanics and is a parody of Yattaran in the Captain Harlock series. He and Nanako became a couple. Voiced by: Yuichi Nagashima

=== Minor characters ===
- Ann Marigold (アン・マリーゴールド An Marīgōrudo): President of the "Gentleman of the Cosmos". She was part of Yamamoto's crew 15 years ago. She stole data about a prototype and used it to become rich and powerful. She married Donzu Marigold, who was a friend of Goro's father, and had a daughter with him. However, due to serious incident of Maza dimension tunnel (a new dimensional tunnel which can teleport spacecraft to further universe directly) which nearly destroy the Earth, the United Earth Federation then closed all dimensional tunnels and deprived the exclusive franchise of dimension tunnels from the Gentleman of the Cosmos, so the company was bankrupted. Ann was arrested because of her pirate career ( Daniel exposed Ann was once a wanted criminal during the opening ceremony of Maza dimension tunnel). Voiced by: Atsuko Tanaka
- Donzu Marigold (ドンズ・マリーゴールド Donzu Marīgōrudo): Late husband of Ann Marigold. He was a friend of Goro's father, Daigo. He died 10 years before the start of the first series, when he was only 34 years old. Voiced by: Mitsuru Miyamoto
- Kanea Marigold (カネア・マリーゴールド Kanea Marīgōrudo): Daughter of Donzu and Ann Marigold. She is hyperactive, rich, and bad-tempered. She is in love with Goro, although he is not interested in her. She leads her own ship, which resembles an enormous cruiser. At the end of season one, after the Gentleman of the Cosmos had bankrupted, Kanea promised to her mother that she would rebuild the Gentle of the cosmos. Voiced by: Satomi Kōrogi
- Daniel (ダニエル Danieru): Caretaker of Kanea Marigold, whose her mother is always working and does not have much time to spend with her. Daniel was fired by Ann because he had known too much (he had known that Yamamoto used to be a pirate) and hence he exposed Ann was once a wanted criminal during the opening ceremony of Maza dimension tunnel for revenge. After that, he realised his mistake and went to rescue Kanea's mother and nearly sacrificed during the accident of Maza dimension tunnel. After the Gentleman of the Cosmos had bankrupted, Daniel was the only staff who still willing to follow Kanea to rebuild the company. Voiced by: Wataru Takagi
- MAM: The most important computer in Kanea's ship. It has feelings, because it was designed to take care of Kanea. It has substituted Ann Marigold's role. Voiced by: Yūko Mita
- Daigo Hoshiwatari (星渡 ダイゴ Hoshiwatari Daigo): Goro's father. He invented the 3D tunnel and created the "Daigo System". While working on the prototype of the tunnel, he was absorbed by the gravitational energy which came from the tunnel, leaving him in a different dimension for 15 years, although he is still 30, because in his world the accident occurred only 20 days before. Voiced by: Jūrōta Kosugi
- Haruka Hoshiwatari (星渡 ハルカ Hoshiwatari Haruka): Goro's mother. She drives a big truck and has a very strong personality. She had raised her only son, Goro, alone since her husband disappeared 15 years before. Voiced by: Kumiko Watanabe
- Mr And Mrs Toukichi (藤吉 Tōkichi): An elderly couple who love travelling with YAT and they appear in nearly all episodes of the first series. They are hoping that something will happen, because it's a tradition in YAT travels.

== Episode list ==
=== Season one (1996–1997) ===
1. Leave it to YAT! (YATにおまかせ!) 1996-10-05
2. Good place known to few people in space! The hot-spring tour (宇宙の穴場! 温泉ツアー) 1996-10-12
3. The ice planet, large pinch! (氷の星で大ピンチ!) 1996-10-19
4. Katsura's prophecy! (桂さんの大予言!) 1996-10-26
5. Girl from outer space! (宇宙一のお嬢様!) 1996-11-02
6. The cosmopolitan success!? (コスモロードで大出世!?) 1996-11-09
7. Survival! Wild Kanea (サバイバル! 野生のカネア) 1996-11-16
8. Delicious explosion! The Gourmet tour (うまさ爆発! グルメツアー) 1996-11-23
9. Useless Couple (いかんともしがたい二人!) 1996-11-30
10. Meet the space pirate, Rock! (宇宙海賊ロック参上!) 1996-12-04
11. Fighting spirit! The decisive battle for the king of space (闘魂! 宇宙王者決定戦) 1996-12-14
12. The terrifying planet Daikyokuten! (恐怖の惑星 ダイキョクテン!) 1996-12-21
13. Surprise! The man who knows YAT? (ビックリ! YATを知る男?) 1996-12-28
14. Super Express! Transport the Princess (超特急! プリンセスを運べ) 1997-01-11
15. Rock's rescue mission! (ロック救出大作戦!) 1997-01-18
16. President Yamamoto!? (ミイラれたヤマモト社長!?) 1997-01-25
17. Intensive training tour for preparatory students! (予備校生 涙の特訓ツアー!) 1997-02-01
18. Holiday for YAT! (YATの休日!) 1997-02-08
19. Reunion! Father appears? (再会! オヤジあらわる?) 1997-02-15
20. Secret treasure of Captain Kid! (キャプテン・キッドの秘宝!) 1997-02-22
21. Big shock! The President is captured (大ショック! 社長つかまる) 1997-03-01
22. 8 friendly customers! (8人のやさしい客たち!) 1997-03-08
23. Out of control! No. Queen Marigold (大暴走! クイーンマリーゴールド号) 1997-03-15
24. Fierceness! Mother's distinctive road (モーレツ! かあちゃん珍道中) 1997-03-22
25. The mysterious father! (まぼろしのオヤジ!) 1997-03-29 (incident)
26. Crack, break, the puzzle is unraveled! (われて砕けて謎を解け!) 1997-04-05
27. Absolute desperation, tour for the unrequited love!? (失恋ツアーで絶体絶命!?) 1997-04-12
28. Kanea leaves home! (カネアの家出!) 1997-04-19
29. Goro and little Goro! (ゴローとコゴロー!) 1997-04-26
30. The lovely Kaoru-chan!? (麗しのカオルちゃん!?) 1997-05-03
31. The talkative Bukki! (おしゃべりブッキー!) 1997-05-10
32. Kanopi's first love! (カナビーの初恋!) 1997-05-17
33. Kanea is taken away!? (さらわれたカネア!?) 1997-05-24
34. Ucchi's date! (ウッチーのお見合い!) 1997-05-31
35. Defeat the villainous extraterrestrial! (凶悪宇宙人をやっつけろ!) 1997-06-07
36. Dimensional tunnel SOS! (次元トンネルSOS!) 1997-06-14
37. Ann Marigold's ambition! (アン・マリーゴールドの野望!) 1997-06-21
38. Daniel's love strategy!? (ダニエルのラブラブ大作戦!?) 1997-06-28
39. Reclaim Katsura-san! (桂さんを取り返せ!) 1997-07-05
40. Captain Rock stops being a pirate! (海賊をやめたキャプテン・ロック!) 1997-07-12
41. Goodbye, regular customer! (常連客よ さようなら!) 1997-07-19
42. Big escape! The blazing spaceship (大脱出! 燃える宇宙船) 1997-07-26
43. The mysterious ancient ruins! (謎の古代遺跡!) 1997-08-02
44. Long, long ago, in space...! (昔、むかし、宇宙で...!) 1997-08-16
45. Clear! The 'Mother' dimensional tunnel (開通! マザー次元トンネル) 1997-08-23
46. The encounter that transcends time! (時を越えた出会い!) 1997-08-30
47. The truth of the 15th year! (15年目の真実!) 1997-09-06
48. Contain the reckless "Mother" (暴走マザーをくい止めろ) 1997-09-13
49. Self-sacrificing 'Mother'-halting strategy (捨て身のマザー停止作戦!) 1997-09-20
50. Separation of the moment!(しばしのおわかれ!) 1997-09-27

=== Season two (1998) ===
1. Sailing off to a New Journey! (新たなる船出!) 1998-04-11
2. Protect Maron! (マロンを守れ!) 1998-04-18
3. Search for Food, Large Pinch! (食料さがしで大ピンチ!) 1998-04-25
4. Monica becomes Small! (モニカ 小さくなる!) 1998-05-02
5. Goodbye, Maron!? (さよならマロン!?) 1998-05-09
6. Reclaim YAT Dove! (YATダブを取り返せ!) 1998-05-16
7. The 3 people who were Caught!(とらわれた3人!) 1998-05-23
8. Talk of such a Night! (こんな夜のはなし!) 1998-05-30
9. Everyone Katamarl!? (みんなカタマール!?) 1998-06-06
10. Monica in Love!? (恋するモニカ!?) 1998-06-13
11. Small Companions! (小さな仲間たち!) 1998-06-20
12. Duel! YAT Jumbo (決戦! YATジャンボ) 1998-06-27
13. Come back, Mr President! (帰ってきて 社長!) 1998-07-04
14. The President who becomes the Enemy!? (敵になった社長!?) 1998-07-11
15. Who is the Leader!? (リーダーは誰だ!?) 1998-07-18
16. Mysterious Pyramid! (謎のピラミッド!) 1998-07-25
17. Large Strife from the Bottom of the Hotspring! (底ぬけ温泉大騒動!) 1998-08-01
18. Queen of Planet Molfas! (惑星モルファスの女王!) 1998-08-08
19. Three Wishes! (三つのお願い!) 1998-08-22
20. Monarch Ganon's Conspiracy! (帝王ガノンの陰謀!) 1998-08-29
21. YAT Jumbo Blast?! (YATジャンボ大爆破!?) 1998-09-05
22. YAT Desperation! (YAT絶体絶命!) 1998-09-12
23. Time to Strike! (反撃のとき!) 1998-09-19
24. The Last Battle! (最後の戦い!) 1998-09-26
25. Aiming toward Home! (故郷をめざして!) 1998-10-03

== Theme music ==
=== First series ===
Opening theme

- "Heaven"

Performed by: HIM
Ending theme

- "Dame yo! Dame yo! Dame yo!" (だめよ!だめよ!だめよ!!) (1–25)

Performed by: Hekiru Shiina

- "Moonlight" (26–50)

Performed by: Hekiru Shiina

=== Second series ===
Opening theme

- "Everlasting Loop" (エヴァーラスティング・ループ, Evārasutingu Rūpu)

Performed by: Supersonic Float
Ending theme

- "Jun" (純, Jun)

Performed by: Hekiru Shiina

== Incident ==
On March 29, 1997, there was an incident involving episode 25 "The Mysterious Father" (まぼろしのオヤジ, Maboroshi No Oyaji) in which viewers, including four children, were taken to hospitals after reportedly watching a scene in the episode with rapidly flashing red and white colors. Later in the year, NHK confirmed that at least 25 people in 9 prefectures were confirmed to have been affected.

The reasons behind this incident were discovered when another similar - albeit larger - incident occurred 9 months later with the infamous Electric Soldier Porygon episode of Pokémon.

A recall was issued for physical copies of the video which, by December 18th, had already sold 1300 copies. Later broadcasts of this episode were edited to ameliorate the effect, unlike the Pokémon episode, which was completely banned.
