= Toshiya =

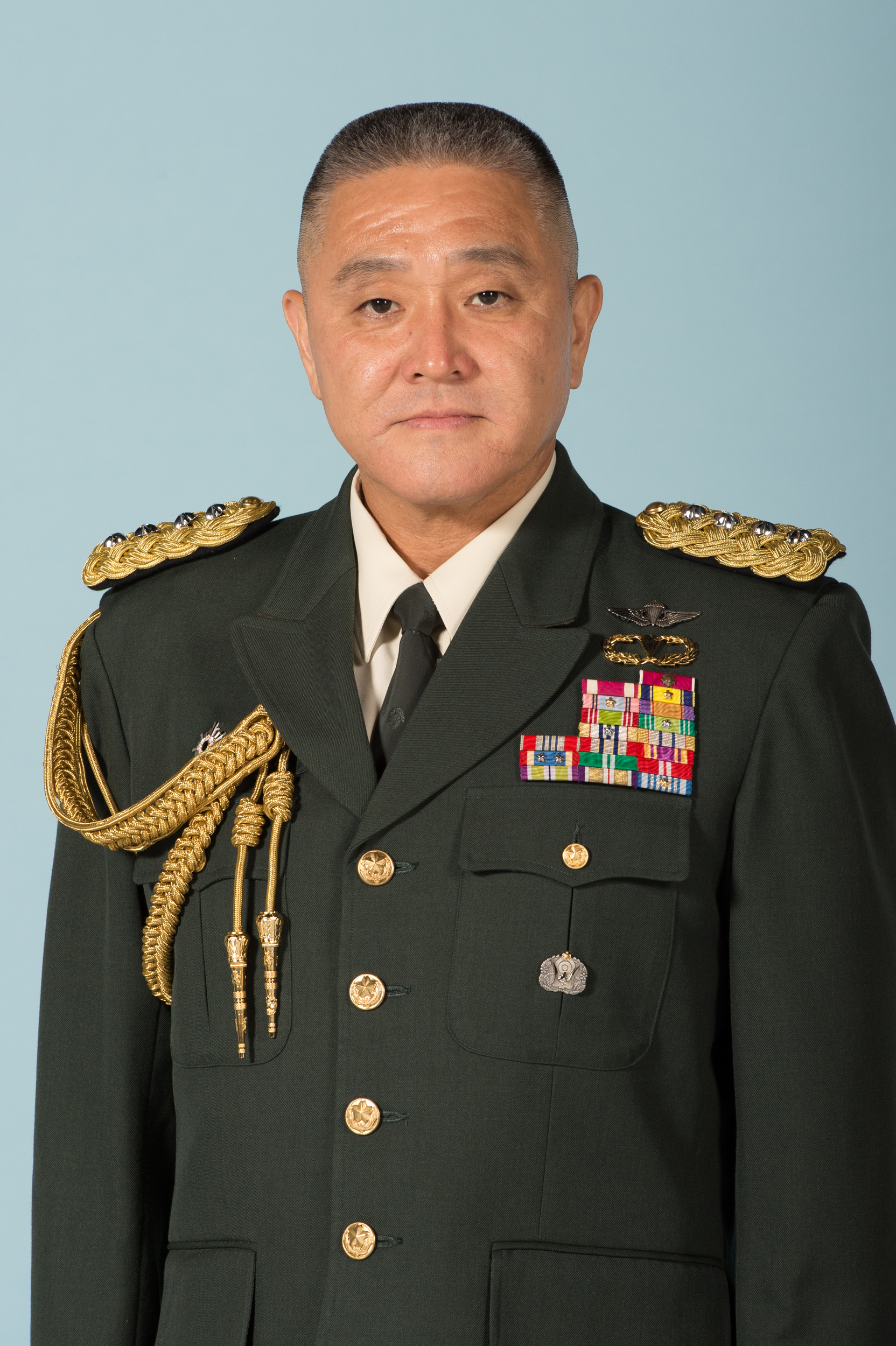
- Toshiya Okabe, Japanese Ground Self-Defense Force officer
- Pronunciation: toɕija (IPA)
- Gender: Male

Origin
- Origin: Japanese
- Meaning: Different meanings depending on the kanji used

Other names
- Alternative spelling: Tosiya (Kunrei-shiki) Tosiya (Nihon-shiki) Toshiya (Hepburn)

Toshiya is a masculine Japanese given name.

== Written forms ==
Toshiya can be written using different combinations of kanji characters. Here are some examples:

- 敏也, "agile, to be"
- 敏矢, "agile, arrow"
- 敏哉, "agile, how (interrogative particle)"
- 敏八, "agile, eight"
- 敏弥, "agile, more and more"
- 俊也, "talented, to be"
- 俊矢, "talented, arrow"
- 俊哉, "talented, how (interrogative particle)"
- 俊八, "talented, eight"
- 俊弥, "talented, more and more"
- 利也, "benefit, to be"
- 利矢, "benefit, arrow"
- 利哉, "benefit, how (interrogative particle)"
- 寿也, "long life, to be"
- 寿矢, "long life, arrow"
- 寿哉, "long life, how (interrogative particle)"
- 年也, "year, to be"
- 年矢, "year, arrow"
- 年哉, "year, divination"

The name can also be written in hiragana としや or katakana トシヤ.

== Notable people with the name ==
- Toshiya Adachi (安達 俊也, born 1965), Japanese baseball player.
- Toshiya Fujita (藤田 俊哉, born 1971), Japanese professional footballer.
- Toshiya Fujita (director) (藤田 敏八, 1932–1997), Japanese actor, writer and director.
- Toshiya Imamura (今村 俊也, born 1966), professional Go player.
- Toshiya Okabe (岡部 俊哉, born 1959), Japanese Ground Self-Defense Force officer.
- Toshiya Onoda (小野田 稔也, born 1970), Japanese bobsledder.
- Toshiya Sueyoshi (末吉 隼也, born 1987), Japanese footballer.
- Toshiya Sugiuchi (杉内 俊哉, born 1980), Japanese baseball player.
- Toshiya Tojo (東城 利哉, born 1992), Japanese footballer.
- Toshiya Ueda (上田 敏也, 1933–2022), a Japanese voice actor.
- Toshiya (born 1977), bassist of the band Dir en Grey.

== See also ==
- Tōshiya, a Japanese archery contest
