= List of Danganronpa: The Animation episodes =

Cover art featuring the students of Hope's Peak Academy and Monokuma.

Danganronpa: The Animation is a 2013 anime television series based on Spike Chunsoft's murder mystery video game, Danganronpa: Trigger Happy Havoc. The series follows a boy named Makoto Naegi who, along with fourteen other students, is imprisoned inside the elite Hope's Peak Academy, where a psychotic remote-controlled bear named Monokuma offers them only one means of escape: murder another student and get away with it.

The anime is produced by Lerche and directed by Seiji Kishi, who is known for directing the anime adaptations Persona 4: The Animation and Devil Survivor 2: The Animation. The series uses Makoto Uezu for its series composition as well as script writing, character designs by Kazuaki Morita based on the original character designs by Rui Komatsuzaki, art direction by Kazuto Shimoyama and sound direction by Satoki Iida. The 13-episode series aired in Japan between July 4 and September 26, 2013, on MBS' Animeism programming block, also airing on TBS, CBC and BS-TBS. The series has been licensed in North America by Funimation, who simulcast the series online and released it on DVD and Blu-ray Disc on November 10, 2015. Manga Entertainment released the series in the United Kingdom on November 9, 2015. Madman Entertainment licensed the series in Australia and New Zealand, Melanesia and Polynesia Region (Cook Islands, Fiji, Tokelau, Solomon Islands, Samoa, Papua New Guinea, and Tonga) who simulcasted the series on Madman Screening Room and released the series on February 10, 2016.

The opening theme is "Never Say Never" by TKDzZb with rapping provided by Jas Mace and Marchitect (aka The 49ers) and Tribeca, whilst the ending theme is "Zetsubōsei: Hero Chiryōyaku" (絶望性：ヒーロー治療薬, Despairity: A Hero's Treatment) by Suzumu featuring Soraru. The opening theme for episode one is "Danganronpa" by Masafumi Takada whilst the opening theme for episode four is "Monokuma Ondo" (モノクマおんど) by Sachiko Kobayashi featuring Monokuma (Nobuyo Ōyama). The ending theme for episode 13 is "Saisei -rebuild-" (再生 -rebuild-, Playback -rebuild') by Megumi Ogata.

== Episode list ==
No.	Title	Directed by	Written by	Storyboarded by	Original release date
1	"Welcome to Despair High School (Pilot Episode)"; Transliteration: "Yōkoso Zetsubō Gakuen" (Japanese: ようこそ絶望学園)	Shinichiro Kimura	Makoto Uezu	Shinichiro Kimura	4 July 2013
After winning a special lottery, Makoto Naegi, an average student, enrolls at the prestigious Hope's Peak Academy for talented high school students. The moment Makoto steps inside the school grounds, however, he falls unconscious. He wakes up in a classroom littered with security cameras and steel plates. Following a note's instruction to assemble in the gym, Makoto finds fourteen other unique students, including an idol from his old middle school, Sayaka Maizono. The self-proclaimed headmaster, a remote-controlled bear named Monokuma, announces that the students will be staying in the school for the rest of their lives and can only "graduate" by killing another student. Rejecting this idea, the students spend the next few days searching the school grounds for an exit. Deciding everyone needs a motive to kill, Monokuma shows each student a personalized DVD motivating them to try to escape at any cost (in Makoto's case, a video of his family being put in danger). As Sayaka is also unnerved by the contents of her video, Makoto tries to calm her down, promising that he will find a way to get both of them out.
2	"(Not) Normal Arc: Kill and Live"; Transliteration: "Ikikiru: (Hi-)Nichijō-hen" (Japanese: イキキル （非）日常編)	Yusuke Kamada	Makoto Uezu	Yusuke Kamada	11 July 2013
After learning from Monokuma about the faulty door on his bedroom's shower room, Makoto is approached by Sayaka, who states she is afraid that someone may be after her, and offers to switch rooms with her to put her at ease. The next day, Makoto discovers Sayaka lying dead in his shower room, stabbed in the stomach with a kitchen knife. Monokuma explains that one of the students is responsible for her murder and they must judge for themselves who the killer is in a "class trial". If the class successfully determines the guilty party, that person alone will be executed, but if they guess wrong, the killer will be set free and everyone else will be put to death. Fashionista Junko Enoshima voices her objection and assaults Monokuma. She is impaled to death by spears as punishment, warning the other students what will happen if they do not follow the rules. The students' electronic handbooks are updated with details about the murder. Makoto is made a prime suspect when it is shown Sayaka had died in his room. The students begin their investigation, making notes of all the evidence they find, including a message written in Sayaka's blood reading "11037". Before the trial begins, Makoto finds Sayaka's motivational DVD, which reveals that her fellow members in an idol group were all killed by Monokuma, who would only explain why if she graduated. As the students head for the courtroom, Makoto receives cryptic words of advice from the mysterious Kyoko Kirigiri.
3	"Not Normal Arc: Kill and Live"; Transliteration: "Ikikiru: Hinichijō-hen" (Japanese: イキキル 非日常編)	Akiyo Ohashi	Makoto Uezu	Seiji Kishi	18 July 2013
As the trial begins, swimmer Aoi Asahina testifies that she and martial artist Sakura Ogami witnessed Sayaka enter the kitchen, during which the kitchen knife used in the murder went missing. Kyoko proves Makoto's innocence by pointing out that, since the boys' shower rooms don't have locks, he wouldn't have needed to dismantle his own doorknob to enter the shower room. After wondering how the culprit entered the room in the first place, Kyoko presents evidence which reveals Sayaka invited someone into the room in order to murder them and pin the crime on Makoto, only to wind up as the victim herself. Remembering the message written in blood, Makoto deduces that "11037" is an upside down spelling of "LEON" and accuses baseball star Leon Kuwata of the crime. His guilt is further proven by how the culprit attempted to dispose of the evidence, his bloodstained shirt, in a manner only capable of a baseball star. When it is deduced that he must have used his tool set to take apart the doorknob, Leon is unanimously voted as the culprit and is executed by Monokuma with a barrage of baseballs. Later that night, Kyoko consoles Makoto by theorizing that Sayaka may have written her dying message in order to protect him.
4	"(Not) Normal Arc: Weekly Shonen Despair Magazine"; Transliteration: "Shūkan Shōnen Zetsubō Magajin: (Hi-)Nichijō-hen" (Japanese: 週刊少年ゼツボウマガジン （非）日常編)	Yoshihiko Iwata	Touko Machida	Minoru Ōhara	25 July 2013
Following the first class trial, Monokuma grants access to the second floor of the academy, containing a library and a swimming pool with gender-divided changing rooms. Whilst searching the library, the group find a broken laptop and a letter that claims Hope's Peak Academy has been shut down for a while, along with a storeroom filled with confidential files. Makoto comes across writer Toko Fukawa, who has a crush on the cold-hearted affluent progeny, Byakuya Togami, and winds up as a witness to a sauna endurance battle between biker Mondo Owada and hall monitor Kiyotaka Ishimaru, who bond with each other as a result. Monokuma announces his next incentive, stating he will publicly announce everyone's personal secrets unless someone is killed in the next 24 hours. The next day, the students discover programmer Chihiro Fujisaki murdered in the girl's changing room, hung up with the words "Bloodbath Fever" written in blood on the wall. During the investigation, some peculiarities are found, such as a seemingly disappearing coffee stain and unfitting posters, along with a testimony by gambler Celestia Ludenberg that she saw Chihiro the night before. Byakuya tells Makoto that he believes the murder to be the work of Genocider Sho, a serial killer who crucified victims in a similar fashion. Toko locks herself in her room, mentioning something about Genocider Sho and failing to keep a promise to Byakuya.
5	"Not Normal Arc: Weekly Shonen Despair Magazine"; Transliteration: "Shūkan Shōnen Zetsubō Magajin: Hinichijō-hen" (Japanese: 週刊少年ゼツボウマガジン 非日常編)	Takashi Kobayashi	Touko Machida	Takashi Kobayashi	1 August 2013
As the second trial begins, Byakuya states that Toko is the culprit as she has dissociative identity disorder, her other personality being Genocider Sho. When Toko faints under the pressure, her personality switches to that of Genocider, who denies killing Chihiro, as she always uses scissors in her serial killings. Being the only other one who knew of Genocider's crimes, Byakuya is suspected of the crime. After Makoto deduces Chihiro was actually killed in the boy's changing room, Kyoko reveals Chihiro was a crossdressing boy. Byakuya admits he is not the killer and only modified the crime scene to make the game more interesting. Celestia gives testimony about seeing Chihiro carry a sports bag containing a jersey the night before. Mondo lets slip that he knew what color the jersey was, eventually admitting he is the culprit. After the guilty verdict, Monokuma reveals that Chihiro came to Mondo, revealing his true gender, in the hopes he could help him become stronger. Mondo, who was keeping secret that he was responsible for his brother's death in order to keep his gang together, became jealous of Chihiro's strength and killed him in a fit of rage, moving his corpse to the girl's changing room and destroying his e-handbook to protect his honor. Lamenting his actions, Mondo is executed, being spun around in a motorcycle cage until liquefied into butter, leaving Kiyotaka mortified. Monokuma talks with an unknown person, discussing the mysterious sixteenth student of the academy.
6	"(Not) Normal Arc: Return of the New Century Galaxy Legend! O Armored Hero, Stand upon the Earth! (Kyoko Kirigiri Absent)"; Transliteration: "Shinseiki Ginga Densetsu Futatabi! Sōkō Yūsha yo Daichi ni Tate!: (Hi-)Nichijō-hen" (Japanese: 新世紀銀河伝説再び！装甲勇者よ大地に立て！ （非）日常編)	Ippei Yokota	Satoko Sekine	Shinichiro Kimura	8 August 2013
After the others investigate the newly opened third floor, containing a rec room, an art room and a physics lab, Monokuma announces his next incentive: a cash reward of 10 billion yen to whoever graduates. The gang discovers a laptop which Chihiro left behind in the bath locker room, containing an A.I. program called Alter Ego who offers to decrypt some files left on the laptop. When Kiyotaka asks Alter Ego if he blames him for Chihiro's death, he imitates Mondo to give him words of encouragement. Alter Ego then shows a photo of Leon, Chihiro, and Mondo hanging together, which could not have possibly been taken during the time they knew each other. Kyoko takes precautions following unhealthy interest from both Kiyotaka and doujin artist Hifumi Yamada. Alter Ego goes missing, leading Byakuya to suspect a mole. The next morning, Celestia claims to have been attacked by someone in a robot costume who took Hifumi hostage. After finding an injured Hifumi in the library and taking him to the infirmary, the students split into groups. While Byakuya's group chases the perpetrator, Makoto's group returns to the infirmary and discovers Hifumi lying in a pool of blood, with Monokuma's 'corpse discovery' announcement suggesting he has been killed. Makoto rushes to inform the other group in the physics lab storage, where he discovers Kiyotaka has been killed as well. Upon returning to the infirmary, the group find Hifumi's body is missing. Kiyotaka's body has also disappeared. They discover the bodies in the art supply room. Hifumi recovers, stating he met everyone before and leaving behind the name 'Yasuhiro' before dying. The 'corpse discovery' alert plays a second time.
7	"Not Normal Arc: Return of the New Century Galaxy Legend! O Armored Hero, Stand upon the Earth!"; Transliteration: "Shinseiki Ginga Densetsu Futatabi! Sōkō Yūsha yo Daichi ni Tate!: Hinichijō-hen" (Japanese: 新世紀銀河伝説再び！装甲勇者よ大地に立て！ 非日常編)	Yusuke Kamada	Satoko Sekine	Yusuke Kamada	15 August 2013
Hifumi's dying words leave most of the students convinced that the culprit is fortune teller Yasuhiro Hagakure, who is found by Kyoko near the pool stuck inside the robot costume. Yasuhiro denies committing any murders, claiming he was knocked out after being called by a note, which is missing. The class trial begins. Makoto vouches for Yasuhiro's innocence, using evidence to point out he could not have designed the outfit or carried the bodies while wearing it. After Kyoko asks the court to consider the two murders as separate incidents, Makoto deduces that Hifumi only faked his death from before. Kyoko's evidence reveals Hifumi killed Kiyotaka, moving his body to the art supply closet, where he himself was killed. Makoto accuses Celestia of the crime, as she knew there was a second victim before it was announced. As Celestia brings up Hifumi's dying words again, Makoto deduces that the 'Yasuhiro' he was referring to was actually Celestia's real name, Taeko Yasuhiro. Accepting defeat, Celestia reveals that she stole Alter Ego to motivate Hifumi to kill Kiyotaka under the premise that they would escape together. She killed Hifumi in the hope of winning the reward money and buying a castle. Leaving Kyoko with the key to Alter Ego's location, Celestia is put through a Versailles-style witch burning before being run over by a fire truck. After the trial, Kyoko has Makoto investigate a hidden room behind the boy's toilets, where he finds confidential records and a note reading "You must not escape from here". He is knocked out by an unseen assailant, who takes all of the files. Whilst returning to his room, Makoto spots Sakura and Monokuma squaring off against each other in the gymnasium.
8	"(Not) Normal Arc: All All Apologies"; Transliteration: "Ōru Ōru Aporojīzu: (Hi-)Nichijō-hen" (Japanese: オール・オール・アポロジーズ （非）日常編)	Keiya Saito	Osamu Murata	Yūji Yanase	22 August 2013
Makoto overhears that Sakura had been forced to become Monokuma's mole as he took her family dojo hostage. As Makoto feels he should not jump to conclusions until he has talked to Sakura, Kyoko becomes annoyed with him for keeping secrets from her. After exploring the fourth floor, containing some locked rooms that Monokuma forbids breaking into, Mondo's gang catches up with Alter Ego, who reports that Hope's Peak Academy was placed under lockdown due to a terrible incident, theorizing that the school's true headmaster may be behind it. He also discovers another strange photo, this time of Sayaka, Celestia, and Hifumi together. Monokuma announces to everyone that Sakura is the mole, who was ordered to kill someone in exchange for her dojo's safety. As Aoi becomes angered by the mean words said about Sakura, she gets into a scrape with Genocider, leaving Sakura angered that innocent people got involved. Alter Ego asks Makoto and Kyoko, who forgives Makoto for keeping quiet about Sakura, to take him somewhere where he can connect to the school network so he can find a way to help the students escape. Despite knowing the risks involved, Makoto and Kyoko respect his wishes and set him up in the hidden room. Makoto, Kyoko, and Aoi discover Sakura dead in the rec room, which is locked from the inside. Kyoko conducts her investigation. Aoi directs her anger towards Byakuya, Toko, and Yasuhiro, feeling one of them is responsible for Sakura's death.
9	"All All Apologies II"; Transliteration: "Ōru Ōru Aporojīzu: Hinichijō-hen" (Japanese: オール・オール・アポロジーズ 非日常編)	Akiyo Ohashi	Osamu Murata	Shinichiro Kimura	29 August 2013
Following an investigation in the chemics lab, the class trial begins. Toko reveals she, Byakuya, and Yasuhiro all received notes from Sakura calling them to the rec room, where she witnessed Yasuhiro attack Sakura with a glass bottle out of fear. However, Yasuhiro being the culprit is ruled out when Makoto reveals Sakura was hit twice. Toko passed out from seeing Sakura's bloody forehead and became Genocider, hitting her with another bottle. As this is also revealed to have not been a killing blow, Byakuya reveals that the actual cause of death was poison. Aoi confesses, claiming that she replaced Sakura's protein shake with poison and gave it to her. However, Makoto and Kyoko's analysis of the 'closed room' scenario, along with a piece of glass found in the poison bottle Byakuya presented, reveal that Aoi is hiding the fact that Sakura committed suicide. She tried to steer the trial to a wrong verdict, believing from a suicide note that Sakura was suffering and that everyone deserved to die to make up for it. Monokuma reveals the note she read was a fake he made. Sakura's real suicide note states that she took her own life to save her dojo and wished for everyone else to make it out of the academy alive. Although the others feel encouraged by Sakura's dying wishes, Monokuma reveals he caught Alter Ego trying to hack into the school network and destroys his laptop with a digger. Later that night, Kyoko has Makoto distract Monokuma while she does some investigating. She warns him about the academy's sixteenth student and Super High School Level Despair: Mukuro Ikusaba.
10	"(Not) Normal Arc: The Junk Food of Despair for Racing through Youth (Halloween Special)"; Transliteration: "Shissō suru Seishun no Zetsubō Janku Fūdo: (Hi-)Nichijō-hen" (Japanese: 疾走する青春の絶望ジャンクフード （非）日常編)	Yasuhiro Geshi	Touko Machida	Shinichi Masaki	5 September 2013
After the group explore the fifth and final floor, containing a botanical garden and a classroom filled with blood, Byakuya questions Kyoko about her identity, but she states she does not remember due to amnesia. Byakuya dismisses this idea and confiscates Kyoko's room key. Makoto is given the responsibility of looking after a survival knife that Toko found. Later that night, Kyoko, who obtained a mysterious key and the details about Mukuro from the headmaster's office thanks to Sakura breaking down the door, asks Makoto to keep Monokuma occupied while she investigates the dorm building's second floor. Makoto comes down with a fever as a result of staying up all night. He has a dream stating he is supposed to stay in Hope's Peak Academy instead of escape from it, before witnessing a masked person wielding the survival knife, followed by Kyoko telling him something he cannot hear. Waking up the next morning to discover the knife is missing, Makoto heads to the gym where everyone else is disassembling a Monokuma unit. Whilst looking for a way to break into the headmaster's office for answers, the group discover a corpse in the botanical garden resembling the masked attacker Makoto saw. Before they can remove the mask and identify the victim, a bomb goes off, torching the corpse and leaving it unidentifiable. Finding a key to the data processing room, the group are confronted by a fully working Monokuma, who reveals all their actions are being broadcast live to the outside world. A class trial is to be held for the corpse they found, which is that of Mukuro Ikusaba.
11	"Not Normal Arc: The Junk Food of Despair for Racing through Youth"; Transliteration: "Shissō suru Seishun no Zetsubō Janku Fūdo: Hinichijō-hen" (Japanese: 疾走する青春の絶望ジャンクフード 非日常編)	Takashi Kobayashi	Touko Machida	Takashi Kobayashi	12 September 2013
Byakuya has Makoto investigate Kyoko's room. Kyoko tells Makoto that the key she found is a master key that can open any door in the school. As the trial begins, Byakuya accuses Kyoko, who has no alibi for Mukuro's death, while she brings up evidence that negates Makoto's alibi. Believing the cause of Mukuro's death to be a blow to the back of the head, Byakuya deduces the weapon was some steel arrows found in a dojo locker, the key to which was discovered in Kyoko's room. Although Byakuya had the key to Kyoko's room, Makoto realizes that Kyoko could have used the master key to get into her room. Makoto decides to not expose her, instead questioning the nature of the trial. Monokuma declares an abrupt end to the trial, declaring Makoto to be the culprit. Before Makoto can be executed by a crusher, a virus left behind by Alter Ego allows Makoto to fall safely into a garbage dump below. Kyoko throws herself down the garbage chute to rescue Makoto. She explains the mastermind originally intended for Makoto to be the victim, planning to frame her for the murder and have her executed. Kyoko has regained some of her memories, revealing herself to be the Super High School Level Detective who came to Hope's Peak Academy to meet her father, the headmaster, who she is not on good terms with. Arriving back inside the academy, Makoto and Kyoko confront Monokuma, saying that simply executing Makoto again would not prove that hope cannot defeat despair. They propose a final all-or-nothing class trial with everyone's lives on the line, in which the students must not only determine Mukuro's killer, but also solve all of Hope's Peak Academy's secrets.
12	"The Reason Super High School Level Bad Luck Attracted Super High School Level Murder, Super High School Level Execution and Super High School Level Despair"; Transliteration: "Chō-kōkō-kyū no Fuun ga Chō-kōkō-kyū no Satsujin to Chō kōkō-kyū no Shokei to Chō kōkō-kyū no Zetsubō o Hikiyoseta Riyū" (Japanese: 超高校級の不運が超高校級の殺人と超高校級の処刑と超高校級の絶望を引き寄せた理由)	Noriyuki Nomata	Makoto Uezu	Shinichiro Kimura	19 September 2013
After being granted access to all previously locked rooms, Makoto and Kyoko investigate the dorm's second floor and find a hidden room in the headmaster's lodge. There they discover the remains of Kyoko's father, who died long before the killing game started, along with an SD card containing video interviews of all the students agreeing to spend their lives in Hope's Peak Academy. Monokuma pulls the plug during the playback. Kyoko deals with the revelation that her father cared more about her than she thought. Makoto uses the headmaster's e-handbook to open some lockers, finding some textbooks belonging to Yasuhiro and a notebook containing Kyoko's handwriting, hinting at there being two 'Despair' students. Makoto visits the science lab, being used as a morgue. He notices some curious wounds on Mukuro's body. Monokuma gives him a photo featuring all sixteen students except for himself. As the class trial begins, the other students reveal they received similar photos, with them missing from their respective photos. Makoto reveals the books he found, deducing they are each missing some of their memories, which were stolen by Monokuma. Makoto then accuses Monokuma of murdering Mukuro, pointing out the true cause of death were wounds matching the ones Junko received. After Kyoko proves her innocence by revealing the burns on her hands, Makoto deduces from Monokuma's obscured evidence the identity of Monokuma's controller and the academy's mastermind to be the real Junko Enoshima.
13	"Goodbye, Despair High School (Series Finale)"; Transliteration: "Sayonara, Zetsubō Gakuen" (Japanese: さよなら絶望学園)	Shinichiro Kimura	Makoto Uezu	Shinichiro Kimura, Seiji Kishi & Takashi Kobayashi	26 September 2013
Junko reveals that she used Mukuro, her older twin sister, to take her place, before showing the others footage of the outside world, revealing it to be in total chaos. This is confirmed by Genocider, who retained her memories as they are kept separate from Toko's. Junko reveals that the memories that were stolen from the students were of two years spent together in Hope's Peak Academy. A year ago, when "The Tragedy" hit the world, the school was converted into a shelter to protect the students carrying hope on their shoulders. Junko killed the headmaster, erased the students' memories, began the killing game, and betrayed her sister. Junko holds a final vote between hope and despair; if everyone votes for hope, they must leave the academy, but should even one student vote in favor of despair, the students will remain in the academy and Makoto alone will be executed. Makoto uses his own hope to inspire the others to stand up against despair, earning him the new title of Super High School Level Hope. With the trial over, Junko revels in the ultimate despair and gives herself the ultimate execution, leaving behind an escape switch. With hope in their hearts, Makoto and the others use the switch to leave the academy and venture into the unknown world, unaware that Monokuma is still active.

== Reception ==
Gaming website GamingTrend gave the series a 40 out of 100 overall, criticizing it for its length and portrayal of events from Trigger Happy Havoc, stating that "no character, moment, or message gets the time it deserves."
