= List of animated television series of 1999 =

This is a list of animated television series first aired in 1999.

Animated television series first aired in 1999
Title	Seasons	Episodes	Country	Year	Original channel	Technique
64 Zoo Lane	4	104	United Kingdom; France	1999–2013	La Cinquième/France 5 (seasons 2–4); CBeebies (seasons 3–4); Der Kinderkanal/KiKA (Germany; seasons 1–2)	Traditional (seasons 1–2); Flash (seasons 3–4)
3000 Whys of Blue Cat	1	3057	China	1999–present	Beijing Television	Traditional
The Adventures of Sam	1	13	Australia	1999	ABC TV	Traditional
Les Ailes du dragon	1	26	Canada; France	1999	Arte	Traditional
Alix	1	26	France	1999	France 3	Traditional
Anak-Anak Sidek	3	39	Malaysia	1999–2003	RTM1	Traditional
Angela Anaconda	3	65	United States; Canada	1999–2001	Teletoon	Flash
Angelmouse	1	26	United Kingdom	1999–2000	CBBC; BBC Children's and Education	Traditional
Anthony Ant	1	27	United Kingdom; Canada	1999	YTV	Traditional
Archie's Weird Mysteries	1	40	France; United States	1999–2000	M6; PAX	Traditional
The Avengers: United They Stand	1	13	United States; Canada	1999–2000	Fox Kids	Traditional
B. Happy	1	4	United States	1999–2003	Cartoon Network (Website)	Flash
Batman Beyond	3	52	United States	1999–2001	Kids' WB (episodes 1-46, 48–52); Cartoon Network (episode 47)	Traditional
Beast Machines: Transformers	2	26	Canada; United States	1999–2000	Fox Kids; YTV; Tokyo MX (Japan)	CGI
Big Guy and Rusty the Boy Robot	2	26	United States	1999–2001	Fox Kids	Traditional
The Big Knights	1	13	United Kingdom	1999–2000	BBC Two	Flash
Billy	1	26	United Kingdom	1999	CITV	Traditional
Blaster's Universe	1	13	United States; Canada; Taiwan	1999–2000	CBS; Teletoon	Traditional
Bob the Builder (1999)	9	117	United Kingdom	1999–2011	CBeebies	Stop-Motion
The Bored Witch	1	52	Spain	1999–2006	TV3	Traditional
The Brothers Flub	1	26	United States; Germany	1999–2000	Nickelodeon; Super RTL	Traditional
Capitaine Fracasse	1	26	France	1999	France 2	Traditional
The Cat&Birdy Warneroonie PinkyBrainy Big Cartoonie Show	1	39	United States	1999–2000	Kids' WB	Traditional
Charley and Mimmo	1	65	Belgium; Canada; France	1999–2002	YTV; Treehouse TV	Traditional
Chowdaheads	1	8	United States	1999-2002	TNT	Traditional
Cita's World			United States	1999–2003	BET	CGI
Cliff Hanger	1	26	France	1999	France 3	Traditional
Courage the Cowardly Dog	4	52	United States	1999–2002	Cartoon Network	Traditional
Crashbox	2	52	Canada; United States	1999–2000	HBO Family	Traditional; CGI; Stop Motion; Live action
Cybersix	1	13	Canada; Japan; Argentina	1999	Teletoon; Kids Station; Telefe	Traditional
Delook & Sharpy	2	104	France	1999–2002	TF1	Traditional
Detention	1	13	United States	1999–2000	Kids' WB	Traditional
Diabolik	1	40	United States; France; Italy	1999–2001	Fox Kids; Italia 1 M6	Traditional
The Dick & Paula Celebrity Special	1	6	United States	1999	FX	Traditional
Dilbert	2	30	United States	1999–2000	UPN	Traditional
Downtown	1	13	United States	1999	MTV	Traditional
Dragon Tales	3	94	United States; Canada	1999–2005	PBS Kids; PBS Kids Sprout	Traditional
Dream Street	5	65	United Kingdom	1999–2002	ITV (CITV)	
Ed, Edd n Eddy	6	69	Canada; United States	1999–2009	Cartoon Network	Traditional
Elliot Moose	2	26	Canada	1999–2000	TVOntario; Télé-Québec; PBS	Traditional; Live action
Famille Pirate	2	40	France; Canada; Germany	1999–2004	France 3 Télévision de Radio-Canada	Traditional
Family Guy	24	445	United States	1999–present	Fox	Traditional (seasons 1–7); Toon Boom Harmony (season 8 onward)
Fantaghirò	1	26	Spain; Italy	1999–2000	Italia 1 Boing; Telecinco	Traditional
Flipper & Lopaka	3	78	Australia	1999–2005	Seven Network	Traditional
Fly Tales	1	65	Canada; France	1999	Teletoon; France 3 Télétoon	Traditional
The Foxbusters	2	26	United Kingdom	1999–2000	ITV (CITV)	Traditional
Futurama	10	160	United States	1999–present	Fox (1999–2003); Comedy Central (2008–13); Hulu (2023–present)	Traditional/CGI
George and Martha	2	26	Canada; United States	1999–2000	YTV; HBO Family	Traditional
Les Globulyss: Voyage au cœur de la vie	1	6	France	1999	France 3	Traditional
The God & Devil Show	1	44	United States	1999–2001	Mondo Mini Shows	Flash
Grabbit the Rabbit	1	13	Israel	1999	Channel 1	Stop Motion
The Great Book of Nature	1	54	Italy; North Korea	1999–2000	Rai 2	Traditional
Hack Mack	1	6	Germany	1999–2000	KIKA	Traditional
Hilltop Hospital	2	52	United Kingdom; France; Germany	1999–2003	ITV (CITV); Canal J France 3 ZDF	Stop Motion
Home Movies	4	52	United States	1999–2004	UPN (1999); Adult Swim (2001–04)	Traditional (season 1); Flash (seasons 2–4)
Hoze Houndz	6	78	Canada	1999–2006	Family Channel	Traditional
Inspecteur Mouse	1	26	France	1999	France 2	Traditional
It's a Pet's World	1	52	France	1999	France 3	Traditional
Jim Button	2	52	Canada; France; Germany	1999	TF1	Traditional
Journey to the West: Legends of the Monkey King	1	52	China; Canada	1999–2000	China Central Television; Teletoon	Traditional
Le JourNul	1	360	Canada	1999–2001	TVA	CGI
Kampung Boy	2	26	Malaysia	1999–2000	Astro Ria; Astro Ceria	Traditional
Kevin Spencer	8	113	Canada	1999–2005	The Comedy Network	Flash
The Kids from Room 402	2	52	Canada; United States	1999–2000	Fox Family Channel; Teletoon; Fox Kids (international)	Traditional
Lavender Castle	1	26	United Kingdom	1999	ITV (CITV)	Stop Motion; CGI
Like, News	2	80	United States	1999–2000	Mondo Mini Shows	Flash
Lisa	1	14	Germany; Sweden; Hungary	1999	KIKA; SVT1	Traditional
Little Bill	2	52	United States	1999–2004	Nickelodeon	Flash
A Little Curious	2	43	United States	1999–2000	HBO	Stop-Motion; CGI; Traditional
Maisy	1	26	United Kingdom	1999–2000	ITV (CITV)	Traditional
Max und Moritz	1	39	Germany	1999–2001	Der Kinderkanal	Traditional
Mega Babies	2	26	Canada; United States	1999–2000	Teletoon; Fox Family Channel	Traditional
Mickey Mouse Works	2	25	United States	1999–2000	ABC (Disney's One Saturday Morning	Traditional
Mike, Lu & Og	2	26	United States	1999–2001	Cartoon Network	Traditional
Milo's Bug Quest	1	26	South Korea	1999–2000	KBS2	Traditional
Mimi and Mr. Bobo	2	33	Spain	1999–2003	La 1	Traditional
Mission Hill	1	13	United States	1999–2002	The WB; Adult Swim	Traditional
Mona the Vampire	4	65	Canada; France; Hong Kong (season 3)	1999–2006	YTV; France 3 (seasons 1–2); Canal J (season 1); TiJi (seasons 3–4)	Traditional
Monster by Mistake	3	51	Canada	1999–2003	YTV; VRAK.TV (season 3)	CGI
Motel	2	167	United Kingdom	1999	Channel 4	CGI
NASCAR Racers	2	26	Canada; United States	1999–2001	Fox Kids; Teletoon	Traditional
The New Woody Woodpecker Show	3	53	United States	1999–2002	Fox Kids	Traditional
Oggy and the Cockroaches	8	182	Canada (season 2), France	1999–present	France 3 (seasons 1–2); Canal+ Family (seasons 3–4); Gulli (seasons 5–present); France Télévisions (seasons 9–present)	Traditional (seasons 1–4); Toon Boom Harmony (seasons 5–present)
Pablo the Little Red Fox	1	52	United Kingdom; France	1999	BBC One/BBC Two (CBBC); Disney Channel; La Cinquième; ZDF (Germany)	Traditional
Percy the Park Keeper	1	13	United Kingdom	1999	ITV (CITV)	Traditional
Phred on Your Head Show	2	31	United States	1999–2001	Noggin	Flash
Los Pintín			Argentina	1999	Canal 13	Traditional
Pip the Appleseed Knight	2	52	France	1999	France 3	Traditional
The PJs	3	44	United States	1999–2001	Fox (1999–2000); The WB (2000–01)	Stop Motion
Princess of the Nile	1	26	France	1999	France 2	Traditional
Pumuckls Abenteuer	1	13	Germany	1999	KiKa	Traditional, Live-Action
Rayman: The Animated Series	1	4	Canada; France; United States	1999–2000	Direct-to-video	CGI
Redwall	3	39	Canada; France (season 1); Germany (seasons 2–3)	1999–2002	Teletoon; France 2 France 3 KI.KA	Traditional
Les Renés	1	26	France	1999	Canal+	Traditional
Rescue Heroes	3	39	Canada; China (season 1)	1999–2002	Teletoon	Traditional
Restol, The Special Rescue Squad	1	26	South Korea	1999	KBS2; NHK BS2 (Japan)	Traditional
Ripley's Believe It or Not!: The Animated Series	1	26	France; Canada	1999	France 3 Family Channel	Traditional
Rocket Power	4	71	United States	1999–2004	Nickelodeon	Traditional
Roswell Conspiracies: Aliens, Myths and Legends	1	40	United States; Canada	1999–2000	Syndication (BKN); YTV	Traditional
Roughnecks: Starship Troopers Chronicles	1	40	United States	1999–2000	Syndication (Bohbot Kids Network)	CGI
Sabrina: The Animated Series	1	65	United States	1999	UPN (Disney's One Too); ABC (Disney's One Saturday Morning)	Traditional
Sherlock Holmes in the 22nd Century	2	26	United Kingdom; United States	1999–2001	ITV (CITV); Fox Kids (season 1); Syndication (season 2)	Traditional
Simsala Grimm	3	52	Germany; France (season 2); Ireland (season 2)	1999–2010	KiKA/NDR/ARD; ORF 1 (Austria); RTÉ2; ABC Kids (Australia)	Traditional
Sonic Underground	1	40	France; United States	1999	TF1; Syndication (BKN Kids II)	Traditional
Spider-Man Unlimited	1	13	United States; Canada	1999–2001	Fox (Fox Kids)	Traditional
SpongeBob SquarePants	16	330	United States	1999–present	Nickelodeon	Traditional; Live action
Station Zero	1	20	United States	1999	MTV	Traditional; Live action
Ted Sieger's Wildlife	1	52	Germany	1999	Der Kinderkanal	Traditional
Thugs on Film	2	106	United Kingdom; United States	1999–2001	Mondo Mini Shows; Reel.com	Flash
Tom et Sheenah	1	26	France	1999–2000	France 3	Traditional
Tristán & Isolda: La Leyenda Olvidada	1	26	France; Spain	1999–2000	France 3	Traditional
Toad Patrol	2	26	Canada	1999–2002	Teletoon	Traditional
Totally Tooned In	1	65	United States	1999–2000	Syndication (worldwide); Antenna TV	Traditional
Twipsy	1	26	Germany	1999	Der Kinderkanal	Traditional; CGI
Waldo's Way	1	26	France; Germany; United Kingdom	1999	Der Kinderkanal	Traditional
Watership Down (1999)	3	39	United Kingdom; Canada	1999–2001	YTV; CITV	Traditional
Weird-Ohs	1	13	Canada; United States; Germany	1999–2000	YTV; Fox Family Channel	CGI
Wondrous Myths and Legends	1	13	United States; Spain	1999-2000		Traditional
Xyber 9: New Dawn	1	22	United States	1999–2007	Fox Kids	Traditional
Zoboomafoo	2	65	United States	1999–2001	PBS Kids; CBC Kids (Canada)	Traditional; Stop Motion; Live action

Anime television series first aired in 1999

Title	Seasons	Episodes	Country	Year	Original channel	Technique
A.D. Police: To Protect and Serve	1	12	Japan	1999	TV Tokyo	Traditional
Aesop World	1	26	Japan	1999	TV Tokyo	Traditional
Angel Links	1	13	Japan	1999	Animax	Traditional
Arc the Lad	1	26	Japan	1999	Wowow	Traditional
Betterman	1	26	Japan	1999		Traditional
The Big O	2	26	Japan	1999–2003		Traditional
Bikkuriman 2000	1	68	Japan	1999–2001		Traditional
Black Heaven	1	13	Japan	1999		Traditional
Blue Gender	1	26	Japan	1999–2000		Traditional
Bomberman B-Daman Bakugaiden V	1	50	Japan	1999–2000		Traditional
Bubu Chacha	1	26	Japan	1999		Traditional
Burst Ball Barrage!! Super B-Daman	1	18	Japan	1999		Traditional
Chō Hatsumei Boy Kanipan	1	21	Japan	1999		Traditional
Colorful	1	16	Japan	1999		Traditional
Corrector Yui	2	52	Japan	1999–2000		Traditional
Crest of the Stars	1	13	Japan	1999		Traditional
Cybersix	1	13	Japan; Canada	1999		Traditional
Cyborg Kuro-chan	1	66	Japan	1999–2001		Traditional
Cybuster	1	26	Japan	1999		Traditional
D4 Princess	1	24	Japan	1999		Traditional
Dai-Guard	1	26	Japan	1999–2000		Traditional
Di Gi Charat	1	16	Japan	1999		Traditional
Digimon Adventure	1	54	Japan	1999–2000	Fuji TV	Traditional
Dual! Parallel Trouble Adventure	1	13	Japan	1999		Traditional
Eden's Bowy	1	26	Japan	1999		Traditional
Excel Saga	1	26	Japan	1999–2000		Traditional
Gokudo the Adventurer	1	26	Japan	1999		Traditional
Great Teacher Onizuka	1	43	Japan	1999–2000		Traditional
Gregory Horror Show	4	88	Japan	1999–2001		CGI
Hunter × Hunter	1	62	Japan	1999–2001		Traditional
I'm Gonna Be An Angel!	1	26	Japan	1999		Traditional
Iketeru Futari	1	16	Japan	1999		Traditional
Infinite Ryvius	1	26	Japan	1999–2000		Traditional
Initial D: Second Stage	1	13	Japan	1999–2000		Traditional
Ippatsu Kiki Musume	1	16	Japan	1999		Traditional
Jibaku-kun	1	26	Japan	1999–2000		Traditional
Jubei-chan: The Ninja Girl	1	13	Japan	1999		Traditional
Kakyūsei	1	14	Japan	1999		Traditional
Karakurizōshi Ayatsuri Sakon	1	26	Japan	1999–2000		Traditional
Kyorochan	1	91	Japan	1999–2001		Traditional
Legend of Himiko	1	12	Japan	1999		Traditional
Magic User's Club	1	13	Japan	1999		Traditional
Medabots	1	52	Japan	1999–2000		Traditional
Microman: The Small Giant	1	52	Japan	1999		Traditional
Mito's Great Adventure: The Two Queens	1	13	Japan	1999		Traditional
Monster Rancher	2	73	Japan	1999–2000		Traditional
Now and Then, Here and There	1	13	Japan	1999–2000		Traditional
Ojamajo Doremi	1	51	Japan	1999–2000		Traditional
Omishi Magical Theater: Risky Safety	1	24	Japan	1999–2000		Traditional
One Piece	20	1062+	Japan	1999–present		Traditional
Oruchuban Ebichu	1	12	Japan	1999		Traditional
Pet Shop of Horrors	1	4	Japan	1999		Traditional
Phantom Thief Jeanne	1	44	Japan	1999–2000		Traditional
Power Stone	1	26	Japan	1999		Traditional
Reign: The Conqueror	1	13	Japan; South Korea; United States	1999		Traditional
Rerere no Tensai Bakabon	1	24	Japan	1999–2000		Traditional
Sensual Phrase	1	44	Japan	1999–2000		Traditional
Seraphim Call	1	12	Japan	1999		Traditional
Shin Hakkenden	1	26	Japan	1999		Traditional
Sorcerous Stabber Orphen 2: Revenge	1	23	Japan	1999–2000		Traditional
Soul Hunter	1	26	Japan	1999		Traditional
Space Pirate Mito	1	13	Japan	1999		Traditional
Starship Girl Yamamoto Yohko	1	26	Japan	1999		Traditional
Steel Angel Kurumi	1	24	Japan	1999–2000		Traditional
Super Life-Form Transformers: Beast Wars Neo	1	35	Japan	1999		Traditional
To Heart	1	13	Japan	1999		Traditional
Trouble Chocolate	1	20	Japan	1999–2000		Traditional
Turn A Gundam	1	50	Japan	1999–2000		Traditional
We Know You, Moonlight Mask-kun!	1	25	Japan	1999–2000		Traditional
Wild Arms: Twilight Venom	1	22	Japan	1999–2000		Traditional
You're Under Arrest Special	1	21	Japan	1999		Traditional
Zoids: Chaotic Century	2	67	Japan	1999–2000		Traditional

== See also ==
- List of animated feature films of 1999
- List of Japanese animation television series of 1999
