= Sisterly Love (disambiguation) =

Sisterly Love is a 1987 Australian television movie for an unmade series. It may also refer to:

- "Sisterly Love", a 1988 episode of Full House
- "Sisterly Love", a 1989 episode of Cheers
- "Sisterly Love", an episode of Steel Angel Kurumi, 1999
- "Sisterly Love", a song from Are You Listening? (Dolores O'Riordan album), 2007
