= List of animated feature films of 1999 =

This is a list of animated feature films first released in 1999.

== List ==
Title	Country	Director	Production company	Animation technique	Format	Notes	Release date	Duration
Alvin and the Chipmunks Meet Frankenstein	United States	Kathi Castillo	Bagdasarian Productions, LLC. Universal Cartoon Studios	Traditional	Direct-to-video		September 28, 1999	78 minutes
An American Tail: The Mystery of the Night Monster	United States	Larry Latham	Universal Cartoon Studios	Traditional	Direct-to-video	Fourth and final installment in the An American Tail film series.	December 9, 1999	78 minutes
Anne Frank's Diary	United Kingdom; Ireland; France; Netherlands; Luxembourg	Julian Y. Wolff	A-N Production Committee; Animation Production Multimedia Investment; Associated Studios Global Toon Network; Brookfield BS; Cleeve Studios; Globe Trotter Network	Traditional			October 22, 1999	88 minutes
Babar: King of the Elephants	Canada; France; Germany	Raymond Jafelice	Nelvana Limited; Home Made Movies; TMO-Loonland	Traditional	Theatrical		February 26, 1999	79 minutes
Bartok the Magnificent	United States	Don Bluth; Gary Goldman	20th Century Fox Animation; Fox Animation Studios	Traditional	Direct-to-video	Spin-off/prequel to Anastasia (1997).	November 16, 1999	68 minutes
Batman Beyond: The Movie	United States	Curt Geda; Dan Riba; Yukio Suzuki	Warner Bros. Animation	Traditional	Direct-to-video		January 10, 1999	132 minutes
Belle's Tales of Friendship	United States	Jimbo Mitchell	Walt Disney Pictures	Traditional	Direct-to-video		August 17, 1999	70 minutes
Break-Age ブレイクエイジ	Japan	Tsuneo Tominaga	Ripple Film; Beam Entertainment	Traditional	Direct-to-video; OVA		September 25, 1999	43 minutes
Captain Bluebear: The Film; Käpt'n Blaubär – Der Film	Germany	Hayo Freitag	ARD Degeto Film; Senator Film Produktion; TCC Toon Company Cologne; TFC Trickompany Filmproduktion	Traditional	Theatrical		December 16, 1999	85 minutes
Cardcaptor Sakura: The Movie 劇場版カードキャプターさくら (Gekijōban Kādokyaputā Sakura)	Japan	Morio Asaka	Madhouse; Bandai Visual	Traditional	Theatrical		August 21, 1999	80 minutes
Carnivale	France; Ireland	Deane Taylor	Millimages; Terraglyph Production	Traditional	Theatrical		July 10, 1999	74 minutes
Cartoon Noir	United States	Piotr Dumała; Jiri Barta; Paul Vester; Pedro Serrazina; Suzan Pitt; Julie Zammarchi		Traditional	Compilation film		December 3, 1999	83 minutes
Case Closed: The Last Wizard of the Century 名探偵コナン 世紀末の魔術師 (Meitantei Konan: Seikimatsu no Majutsushi)	Japan	Kenji Kodama	TMS Entertainment	Traditional	Theatrical		April 17, 1999	90 minutes
Century of the Wind; El siglo del viento	Uruguay	Fernando Birri	Cine Ojo	Mixed / Live action	Theatrical		February 11, 1999 (Berlin International Film Festival)	90 minutes
City Hunter: Death of the Vicious Criminal Ryo Saeba シティーハンター 緊急生中継！？ 凶悪犯冴羽獠の最期 (City Hunter Special: Kinkyū Seichūkei!? Kyōakuhan Saeba Ryo no Saigo)	Japan	Masaharu Okuwaki	Sunrise	Traditional	Television film		April 23, 1999	80 minutes
Crayon Shin-chan: Explosion! The Hot Spring's Feel Good Final Battle クレヨンしんちゃん 爆発!温泉わくわく大決戦 (Kureyon Shinchan: Bakuhatsu! Onsen Wakuwaku Daikessen)	Japan	Keiichi Hara	Shin-Ei Animation; Asatsu-DK	Traditional	Theatrical		April 17, 1999	110 minutes
Cyber Team in Akihabara: Summer Vacation of 2011 劇場版 アキハバラ電脳組 2011年の夏休み (Akihabara Dennō Gumi: 2011 Nen no Natsuyasumi)	Japan	Hiroaki Sakura; Yoshitaka Fujimoto	Production I.G; Xebec; Tokyo Broadcasting System; King Records	Traditional	Theatrical		August 14, 1999	60 minutes
D4: The Trojan Dog	Australia		Burbank Animation Studios	Traditional	Television film			50 minutes
Dexter's Laboratory: Ego Trip	United States	Genndy Tartakovsky	Hanna-Barbera	Traditional	Television special	First television film produced for Cartoon Network, final television film produced by Hanna-Barbera and the directorial film debut of Genndy Tartakovsky.	December 10, 1999	48 minutes
Doctor Slump: Arale's Surprise Burn ドクタースランプ アラレのびっくりバーン (Dokutā Suranpu: Arare no Bikkuri Bān)	Japan	Shigeyasu Yamauchi	Toei Animation	Traditional	Theatrical		March 6, 1999	50 minutes
Donkey Kong Country: The Legend of the Crystal Coconut	Canada; United States		Nelvana	Computer	Direct-to-video			
Doraemon: Nobita Drifts in the Universe ドラえもん のび太の宇宙漂流記 (Doraemon: Nobita no Uchū Hyōryūki)	Japan	Tsutomu Shibayama	Fujiko F. Fujio Pro; Asatsu; Shin-Ei Animation	Traditional	Theatrical	Twentieth installment of the Doraemon film series.	March 6, 1999	93 minutes
Doug's 1st Movie	United States	Maurice Joyce	Jumbo Pictures; A. Film A/S; Walt Disney Television Animation	Traditional	Theatrical	Based on the television series Doug (1991–99).	March 26, 1999	83 minutes
The Emperor's Treasure	United States	Diane Eskenazi	Golden Films	Traditional	Direct-to-video		July 31, 1999	46 minutes
Faeries	United Kingdom	Gary Hurst	Cartwn Cymru; HIT Entertainment; United Productions	Traditional			June 23, 1999	90 minutes
Fantasia 2000	United States	Don Hahn; Pixote Hunt; Hendel Butoy; Eric Goldberg; Hendel Butoy; James Algar; Francis Glebas; Paul and Gaëtan Brizzi	Walt Disney Feature Animation	Traditional	Theatrical	Sequel to Fantasia (1940); The second Disney animated feature film to be a sequel.	December 17, 1999 (Premiere); January 1, 2000 (IMAX); June 16, 2000 (United States)	74 minutes
The File of Young Kindaichi 2: Murderous Deep Blue 金田一少年の事件簿２ 殺戮のディープブルー (Kindaichi Shōnen no Jikenbo 2: Satsuriku no Deep Blue)	Japan	Daisuke Nishio	Toei Animation	Traditional	Theatrical		August 21, 1999	91 minutes
Goomer	Spain	Jose Luis Feito; Carlos Varela	Sociedad General de Derechos Audiovisuales (SOGEDASA); Castelao Producciones	Traditional			July 9, 1999	80 minutes
Gundress ガンドレス (GUNDRESS)	Japan	Junichi Sakai; Katsuyoshi Yatabe; Kazumasa Fujiie; Kentaro Izaki	The "Gundress" Production Committee	Traditional	Theatrical		March 20, 1999	84 minutes
Happy Birthday: Inochi Kagayaku Toki ハッピーバースデー 命かがやく瞬間 (Happy Birthday: The Moment When Life Shines)	Japan	Satoshi Dezaki	Magic Bus	Traditional	Theatrical		July 27, 1999	80 minutes
The Iron Giant	United States	Brad Bird	Warner Bros. Feature Animation	Traditional / Computer	Theatrical		July 31, 1999 (Mann's Chinese Theater); August 6, 1999 (United States)	87 minutes
Jack and the Beanstalk	United Kingdom	Martin Gates	Martin Gates Productions; Carrington Productions International	Traditional	Direct-to-video		October 11, 1999	75 minutes
Jingle Bells	United States	Bert Ring	Hyperion Pictures	Traditional	Direct-to-video		September 7, 1999	48 minutes
Jin-Roh: The Wolf Brigade 人狼 (Jinrō)	Japan	Hiroyuki Okiura	Production I.G. Bandai Visual	Traditional	Theatrical		November 17, 1999	102 minutes
The King and I	United States	Richard Rich	Morgan Creek Productions; Rankin/Bass Productions; Nest Family Entertainment; Rich Animation Studios	Traditional	Theatrical		March 19, 1999	89 minutes
Kochira Katsushika-ku Kameari Kōen Mae Hashutsujo: The Movie こちら葛飾区亀有公園前派出所 -The Movie- (This Is the Kōban in Front of Kameari Park in Katsushika Ward -The Movie- )	Japan	Shinji Takamatsu	Fuji TV; NAS; Shueisha; Studio Gallop	Traditional	Theatrical		December 23, 1999	95 minutes
The Legend of the Titanic; La leyenda del Titanic; La leggenda del Titanic	Italy	Orlando Corradi; Kim J. Ok	SEK Studio; ITB Spain; Hollywood Gang Productions USA; Mondo TV	Traditional			April 17, 1999	84 minutes
Lotus Lantern 宝莲灯 (Bao lian deng)	China	Chang Guangxi	Shanghai Animation Film Studio	Traditional			July 30, 1999	85 minutes
Lupin III: The Columbus Files ルパン三世『愛のダ・カーポ ～Fujiko's Unlucky Days』 (Rupan Sansei: Ai no Da Kāpo – Fujiko's Unlucky Days)	Japan	Shinichi Watanabe	Tokyo Movie Shinsha	Traditional	Television special		July 30, 1999	92 minutes
Madeline: Lost in Paris	United States	Stan Phillips	DIC Entertainment	Traditional	Direct-to-video		August 3, 1999	75 minutes
Manuelita	Argentina	Manuel García Ferré	García Ferré Entertainment	Traditional			July 8, 1999	86 minutes
Marco: 3000 Leagues in Search of Mother; MARCO ～母をたずねて三千里～ (Marco: Haha o Tazunete Sanzenri)	Japan	Kozo Kuzuha	Nippon Animation	Traditional	Theatrical	Feature film remake of the 1976 animated television series 3000 Leagues in Search of Mother, based on the same source material, which originally ran January 4 to December 26 of that year and produced by the same studio that made the earlier TV series; An earlier feature film was produced and released in 1980 compiled from episodes of the aforementioned TV series.	April 2, 1999	98 minutes
Mickey's Once Upon a Christmas	United States	Alex Mann; Jean-François Laguionie	Walt Disney Television Animation	Traditional	Direct-to-video		November 9, 1999	66 minutes
Millionaire Dogs; Hot Dogs: Wau – wir sind reich!	Germany	Michael Schoemann	Ostdeutscher Rundfunk Brandenburg (ORB); EIV Entertainment Invest GmbH & Company KG; Zweites Deutsches Fernsehen (ZDF); Benchmark Entertainment Picture Productions	Traditional			April 1, 1999	82 minutes
Mishy and Mushy; Egérút	Hungary	Béla Ternovszky	Studió 2	Traditional			December 16, 1999	87 minutes
A Monkey's Tale; Le Château des singes (The Castle of Monkeys)	France; United Kingdom; Germany; Hungary	Jean-François Laguionie	Canal + France 3 British Sky Broadcasting; Kecskemétfilm	Traditional			June 2, 1999	79 minutes
My Neighbors the Yamadas ホーホケキョとなりの山田くん (Hōhokekyo Tonari no Yamada-kun)	Japan	Isao Takahata	Studio Ghibli	Traditional	Theatrical	Seventh animated feature directed by Isao Takahata.	July 17, 1999	104 minutes
The Nuttiest Nutcracker	United States	Harold Harris	Dan Krech Productions; Pacific Title/Mirage	Computer	Direct-to-video		October 19, 1999	48 minutes
O' Christmas Tree	United States	Bert Ring	Hyperion Pictures	Traditional	Direct-to-video		November 5, 1999	48 minutes
Our Friend, Martin	United States	Rob Smiley, Vincenzo Trippetti	DIC Entertainment; Columbia TriStar Television; DHX Media	Traditional	Direct-to-video		January 12, 1999	61 minutes
Olive, the Other Reindeer	United States	Oscar Moore	DNA Productions; Flower Films; The Curiosity Company; Fox Television Studios; 20th Century Fox Animation	Computer	Television special		December 17, 1999	45 minutes
Pettson & Findus – The Cat and the Old Man Years; Pettson och Findus – Katten och gubbens år	Sweden	Albert Hanan Kaminski	Happy Life Animation; TV-Loonland AG	Traditional			December 25, 1999	75 minutes
Pippi Longstocking: Pippi's Adventures in the South Seas; Pippi i Söderhavet	Sweden		Nelvana; Svensk Filmindustri (SF); TFC Trickompany Filmproduktion; Taurus Film	Traditional		Film compiled from TV series episodes	September 4, 1999	70 minutes
Pokémon: The Movie 2000 劇場版ポケットモンスター 幻のポケモン ルギア爆誕 (Gekijōban Poketto Monsutā Maboroshi no Pokemon Rugia Bakutan)	Japan	Kunihiko Yuyama	OLM, Inc.	Traditional	Theatrical		July 17, 1999	82 minutes
Puss in Boots	United States	Phil Nibbelink	Phill Nibbelink Productions	Traditional / Flash	Direct-to-video	Animated entirely by one person (Phil Nibbelink). One of the first animated films made with Macromedia Flash.	January 1, 1999 (Theater); July 6, 1999 (Direct-to-video)	75 minutes
Die Reise zum Mond; A Trip to the Moon	China; Germany	Manfred Durniok; Hong Hu Zhao	Manfred Durniok Filmproduktion; Mitteldeutscher Rundfunk (MDR); Oriental Communications; Shanghai Animation Film Studio	Stop motion			December 27, 1999	80 minutes
Revolutionary Girl Utena: Adolescence of Utena 少女革命ウテナ アドゥレセンス黙示録 (Shōjo Kakumei Utena Aduresensu Mokushiroku)	Japan	Kunihiko Ikuhara	J.C. Staff	Traditional	Theatrical		August 14, 1999	87 minutes
Samurai Shodown 2: Asura Zanmaeden; SAMURAI SPIRITS 2 〜アスラ斬魔伝〜 (SAMURAI SPIRITS 2 ~ Asura Zanmaden ~)	Japan	Kazuhiro Sasaki	Ajiado; Enix	Traditional		Two-part OVA.	June 25, 1999 (part 1) September 30, 1999 (part 2) December 24, 1999 (Japan)	56 minutes
Scooby-Doo! and the Witch's Ghost	United States	Jim Stenstrum	Hanna-Barbera Cartoons; Warner Bros. Animation	Traditional	Direct-to-video		October 5, 1999	66 minutes
Shōta no Sushi: Kokoro ni Hibiku Shari no Aji 将太の寿司 心にひびくシャリの味 (Shōta's Sushi: The Taste of Sushi Rice That Flutters in Your Heart)	Japan	Toshitaka Tsunoda	Studio Comet; Nippon Cultural Broadcasting Group; TV Tokyo	Traditional	Television special		October 11, 1999	
The Sissy Duckling	United States	Anthony Hall	Hyperion Pictures; Fil-Cartoons (animation production)	Traditional	Television special	Story adapted by the author Harvey Fierstein into a children's picture book of the same title published three years later.	July 24, 1999	53 minutes
Snow White and the Frog King 白雪公主与青蛙王子	China	Qian Yunda, Chan Rudong, Wu Zhongwen	Shanghai Animation Film Studio; Man Dunyok Production Company	Stop motion				
Soreike! Anpanman Yūki no Hana ga Hiraku Toki それいけ! アンパンマン 勇気の花がひらくとき (Let's Go! Anpanman: When the Flower of Courage Opens)	Japan	Toshiya Shinohara	Tokyo Movie Shinsha	Traditional	Theatrical		July 24, 1999	
South Park: Bigger, Longer & Uncut	United States	Trey Parker	Comedy Central Films	Computer	Theatrical	Based on the television series South Park (1997–present).	June 23, 1999 (Grauman's Chinese Theater); June 30, 1999 (United States)	81 minutes
Tarzan	United States	Kevin Lima; Chris Buck	Walt Disney Feature Animation	Traditional	Theatrical	Tenth and final film of the Disney Renaissance.	June 12, 1999 (El Capitan Theatre); June 16, 1999 (United States)	88 minutes
Tarzan of the Apes	United States	Diane Eskenazi; Darcy Wright	Golden Films	Traditional	Direct-to-video		March 9, 1999	48 minutes
Tenchi Forever! The Movie 天地無用 IN LOVE 2! − 遙かなる想い (Tenchi Muyō in Rabu Tsū!: Haruka naru omoi)	Japan	Hiroshi Negishi	Anime International Company; Pioneer LDC; GAGA Communications	Traditional	Theatrical		April 24, 1999	95 minutes
The Three Little Pigs	Australia		Burbank Animation Studios	Traditional	Direct-to-video		1999	
Tobias Totz and His Lion; Tobias Totz und sein Löwe	Germany	Piet De Rycker; Thilo Rothkirch	Bioskop Film; Munich Animation Film; Rothkirch Cartoon Film; Stupid Studio; Warner Bros. Pictures	Traditional	Theatrical		September 30, 1999	72 minutes
Toy Story 2	United States	John Lasseter	Pixar Animation Studios	Computer	Theatrical	Sequel to Toy Story (1995); the first Pixar film to be a sequel.	November 13, 1999 (El Capitan Theatre); November 24, 1999 (United States)	92 minutes
Wakko's Wish	United States	Liz Holzman; Rusty Mills; Tom Ruegger	Warner Bros. Animation; Amblin Entertainment	Traditional	Direct-to-video	The first Animaniacs media to use digital paint and paint.	December 21, 1999	80 minutes
We Wish You a Merry Christmas	United States	Bert Ring	Hyperion Pictures	Traditional	Direct-to-video		September 7, 1999	48 minutes
Werner – Volles Rooäää!!! Werner – Full Rooäää!!!	Germany	Gerhard Hahn	Achterbahn AG; Constantin Film; Hahn Film AG	Traditional	Theatrical		September 16, 1999	78 minutes
Winnie the Pooh: Seasons of Giving	United States	Harry Arends; Jun Falkenstein; Karl Geurs	Walt Disney Home Video; Walt Disney Video Premiere; Walt Disney Television Animation	Traditional	Direct-to-video; Compilation film	Film based on, and compiled from episodes of from, the TV series The New Adventures of Winnie the Pooh (1988–91).	November 9, 1999	70 minutes
You're Under Arrest: The Movie 劇場版逮捕しちゃうぞ (Gekijōban Taiho Shichauzo)	Japan	Junji Nishimura	Studio Deen	Traditional	Theatrical		April 24, 1999	92 minutes (France), 90 minutes (United States)
Zeno – For the Infinity of Love ゼノ かぎりなき愛に (Zeno – Kagiri Naki Ai ni)	Japan	Takashi Ui	Mr. Zeno's Movie Making Party; M Project	Traditional	Theatrical	Based on the life of Polish Franciscan friar Zenon Żebrowski (1891–82).		

== Highest-grossing animated films of the year ==
Rank	Title	Studio	Worldwide gross	Ref.
1	Toy Story 2	Pixar Animation Studios	$490,728,379	
2	Tarzan	Walt Disney Feature Animation	$448,191,819	
3	Pokémon: The Movie 2000	OLM, Inc.	$133,949,270	
4	Fantasia 2000	Walt Disney Feature Animation	$90,874,570	
5	South Park: Bigger, Longer & Uncut	Comedy Central Films / Scott Rudin Productions	$83,137,603	
6	The Iron Giant	Warner Bros. Feature Animation	$31,333,917	
7	Doraemon: Nobita Drifts in the Universe	Shin-Ei Animation	$20,900,000	
8	Doug's 1st Movie	Jumbo Pictures / Walt Disney Television Animation	$19,440,089	
9	Case Closed: The Last Wizard of the Century	TMS Entertainment	$17,719,333	
10	The King and I	Warner Bros. Feature Animation	$11,993,021	

== See also ==
- List of animated television series of 1999
