= List of Great Teacher Onizuka episodes =

Key visual of the series

The anime television series Great Teacher Onizuka is based on Tōru Fujisawa's manga series Great Teacher Onizuka. Animated by Studio Pierrot and directed by Noriyuki Abe, the series ran for 43 episodes and was broadcast on Fuji Television from June 30 1999, to September 24, 2000. During the original run, episodes were identified as "lessons" and did not have titles. The episode titles in the list below are from the English Tokyopop release.

The anime series uses five pieces of theme music: two openings and three endings. The first opening theme, "Driver's High" by L'Arc-en-Ciel is used from episodes 1–17. The second opening theme, "Hitori no Yoru" by Porno Graffitti is used from episodes 18–43. The first ending theme, "Last Piece" by Kirari is used from episodes 1–17. The second ending theme, "Shizuku" by Miwako Okuda is used from episodes 18–33, while the third ending theme, "Cherished Memories" by Hong Kong Knife is used from episodes 34–42. The first opening theme, "Driver's High" is used as the ending theme in episode 43 and an insert song in episode 17.

== Episodes ==
| No. | Title | Original release date |
|---|---|---|
| 1 | "GTO – The Legend Begins" | June 30, 1999 |
Eikichi Onizuka begins his career as a teacher-in-training expecting that he will get a class of attractive, nubile high school girls. When he is assigned the problem "Class O", a group of delinquents and blackmailers, only his tough love is able to win them over.
| 2 | "Enter Uchiyamada!" | July 7, 1999 |
Eikichi applies at Holy Forest Academy, and conflicts with the school's vice principal, Hiroshi Uchiyamada. Disgusted by his condescending attitude, he leaves knowing that they never would have hired him anyway. However, the school's chairwoman Ryoko Sakurai, impressed by his character, decides to offer him a job.
| 3 | "Late Night Roof Diving" | July 21, 1999 |
The new school year gets off to a rocky start for Eikichi. To his great consternation, not only was he expected to live in a storage room, he has been assigned to teach middle school instead of high school students. He also had to rescue a student, Noboru Yoshikawa, from suicide.
| 4 | "The Secret Life of Onizuka" | August 11, 1999 |
Eikichi learns first-hand what tricks his homeroom students are capable of. Yoshito Kikuchi, a computer expert, releases fake images of Eikichi engaged in BDSM and homosexual acts. Instead of getting mad, Eikichi asks Yoshito if he can create nude celebrity pictures for him.
| 5 | "An Eye for an Eye, a Butt for a Butt" | August 18, 1999 |
Anko Uehara and her gang bullies Noboru for hanging out with Eikichi. They manage to tie him up and beat him to a pulp while he is nude, then take pictures for blackmail. After rescuing Noboru from suicide (again), Onizuka realizes the full extent of Anko's behavior. However, Anko's mother is an important member of the PTA, giving her a shield against punishment.
| 6 | "Conspiracies All Around" | August 25, 1999 |
Following Anko's "lesson", Eikichi must face the PTA for his actions. During the hearing, Noboru shows the teachers and parents the extent of his pain—physically and emotionally. Anko's mother, still unbelieving of her child's actions, is forced to realize the truth when Yoshito plays a tape recording over the PA system of Anko discussing the truth about her mother and Noboru with her friends.
| 7 | "The Mother of all Crushes" | September 1, 1999 |
While preparing for parent-teacher meetings, Eikichi learns that one of his students, Kunio Murai, has a very young mother, Julia. Eikichi decides that "dates" are an excellent way to get to know the parents, and has dinner with Julia much to Kunio's dismay.
| 8 | "Bungee Jumping Made Easy" | September 8, 1999 |
Julia takes Kunio and his friends, Kouji Fujiyoshi and Tadaaki Kusano, out bowling but also invites Eikichi to Kunio's dismay. Julia is called away for work and she leaves the males alone in the venue which almost ends in disaster. On their way home, Kunio and his friends are confronted by local punks who have stolen Hiroshi Uchiyamada's beloved Toyota Cresta. They believe they are saved when Eikichi arrives, however he suggests the punks send Kunio over a bridge in a bungee jump. Kunio jumps, but when Eikichi suggests leader of the punks do the same, they take off.
| 9 | "Onizuka and the Art of War" | September 22, 1999 |
Incensed at Eikichi' childish behavior, P.E. teacher Hajime Fukuroda challenges him to a swimming race but loses badly. Meanwhile, Miyabi Aizawa enlists her friend Tomoko Nomura to frame Eikichi as an underwear thief. When she accidentally incriminates Mr. Fukuroda instead, Miyabi berates Tomoko for her stupidity.
| 10 | "Outside Looking In" | September 22, 1999 |
Tomoko is shattered that Miyabi no longer wants her as a friend. Eikichi tries to cheer Tomoko up and enters her in beauty contest to help with her self-esteem and invites the rest of the class to the event.
| 11 | "To Be Idolized by a Nation" | October 17, 1999 |
At the talent beauty contest, Tomoko's clumsiness makes her a long shot to win. She discovers that being herself is her special talent and gains newfound respect from her classmates, including Miyabi Aizawa.
| 12 | "The Formula for Treachery" | October 31, 1999 |
Suguru Teshigawara, the math teacher, has an obsessive interest in language teacher Azusa Fuyutsuki. However, Eikichi inadvertently incurs Suguru's wrath when he ruins Suguru's plans to win Azusa over, causing him to plot his revenge.
| 13 | "Only the Best Will Do" | November 21, 1999 |
Suguru enlists a parent lobby group led by Mrs Ota to get Eikichi fired. To prove his worth, Eikichi must score the highest mark in a national scholastic achievement test. Meanwhile, Mrs Ota's daughter Hidemi, who treats Suguru as her subservient pet, tries to pressure Eikichi into also becoming her pet to carry influence with her mother but he resists and spanks her instead.
| 14 | "Between a Rock and a Hard Place" | December 5, 1999 |
Determined to prevent his dismissal, Azusa invites Eikichi to her place for a week of intensive day-night study sessions. Meanwhile, Eikichi's students attempt to steal the test answers from the school and are almost caught. Hidemi offers to help Eikichi if he becomes her pet but he refuses. Eikichi then witnesses her abduction from outside the school and gives chase on a motor scooter.
| 15 | "The Great Sacrifice" | December 12, 1999 |
Eikichi follows the kidnappers to an abandoned warehouse and takes on the gang. During the ensuing brawl, Eikichi rescues Hidemi, but he is shot in the process. He manages to return to the school, but then has to write the day-long test in one hour. When the results are tabulated, Eikichi has a perfect score, however it is revealed that the school chairman has manipulated the assessment. Eikichi keeps his job, much to the relief of most of the students.
| 16 | "Beauty + Brains = A Dangerous Mix" | December 19, 1999 |
Eikichi uses his newfound hero status to seek a girlfriend on national TV. Mischievously, Miyabi Aizawa invites the beautiful but mischievous student, Urumi Kanzaki, to feign interest in him. She manipulates him into being arrested as a pervert causing him much embarrassment, and then enrolls in his class. Eikichi is unable to take revenge because she has an extremely high IQ. She is also seen as an asset to the school even though she has caused other teachers to resign due to her frustrating intellectual superiority.
| 17 | "Falling for The Great Onizuka" | January 16, 2000 |
Eikichi learns that Urumi went through a traumatic childhood experience and tries to help her cope with it using his own confrontational brand of teaching. She is quite cynical of his motives, but she is surprised when he saves her after accidentally pushing her off a building.
| 18 | "How to Dine and Dash" | January 23, 2000 |
Eikichi is blackmailed by Urumi for pushing her off a building and he subjects himself to her whims. After meeting her former elementary teacher Miss Fujimori whom she now loathes, Urumi goes on a classroom terrorism spree, setting off a series of explosions in a school building.
| 19 | "Private Investigations" | January 30, 2000 |
Miss Fujimori admits that she is the cause of Urumi's mistrust towards teachers after first tutoring the bright student at her home, but then withdrawing contact when she realized that Urumi's abilities exceeded her own. Subsequently during a moment of frustration, Fujimori publicly revealed a personal secret Urumi had shared with her, causing Urumi to seek revenge against all teachers. To cure Urumi's cynical attitude towards people and life, Eikichi takes her on a death-defying motorcycle ride and convinces her that life is worth living.
| 20 | "Love Letters" | February 6, 2000 |
Kunio finds a love letter in his locker signed "F" and suspects it is from Akane Fujita, a girl he likes. However, it is not until Akane dumps him that Kunio realizes that the letter was from his platonic friend, Fuyumi Kujirakawa who secretly has a crush on him.
| 21 | "Revolution Everywhere" | February 13, 2000 |
Teacher Azusa Fuyutsuki finds herself being tormented by the girls in her class because she is friendly with the boys. When she suddenly leaves to visit her former school in Hakuba, Eikichi, Tomoko, Yoshito, and Kunio follow in order to convince her to return. Azusa discovers that a former student feels betrayed because her teacher left after she had an affair with another teacher who was married. Azusa also learns that the school is about to be demolished.
| 22 | "The Art of Demolition" | February 20, 2000 |
Eikichi manages to convince Hitomi that teachers are only human and sometimes make mistakes. Hitomi rushes into school before its demolition to save an organ that meant a lot to her, however the countdown has started. Eikichi also rushes in and rescues her just as the school is destroyed. Following these events, Azusa has a renewed conviction to remain a teacher.
| 23 | "Superstition" | February 27, 2000 |
Cursed chain letters begin arriving at the school, and Eikichi receives a box full of them but he dismisses the letters as superstition. After a series of misfortunes, he begins to believe in the curse and does whatever he can to avoid misfortune, but ends up in hospital and becomes convinced that he is dying of cancer. He leaves the hospital and goes out on a farewell nightclubbing binge, but the students reveal to him that he is not dying and he returns to normal. It is later revealed that the letters were sent by the naïve and impressionable Tomoko.
| 24 | "Compromising Positions" | March 5, 2000 |
Vice Principal, Mr. Uchiyamada, begins to have a mid-life crisis due to his continued frustration with Eikichi Onizuka's behavior at school, including having his students paint a mural similar to World War II nose art. This is only made worse when Uchiyamada's wife invites Eikichi to tutor their daughter, Yoshiko. When Eikichi and Yoshiko are seen together in the hotel district of Shibuya, Uchiyamada goes looking for his daughter. Through a sequence of events Uchiyamada ends up naked in the city and is rescued from potential embarrassment by Eikichi.
| 25 | "Playing Doctor – GTO Style" | March 12, 2000 |
An attractive school nurse, Nao Kadena, arrives at the school, much to the delight of Eikichi. However, she soon starts marketing beauty products, food supplements and lucky charms to the students, and Eikichi. Eikichi's friend, Ryuji Danma, recalls that he had seen Nao before and tells Eikichi she was formerly a street car racer called the Queen of Hakosuka who disappeared after having an accident during a driving game called "No Signals".
| 26 | "Onizuka Meets His Match" | March 19, 2000 |
Nao reveals to Eikichi and Azusa Fuyutsuki that she has raised ¥30 Million to pay for an operation on her brother who was injured during street racing and has metal pieces still in his body. However, they discover that the operation arrangement is a scam and she loses all her money and becomes severely depressed. To teach her about self-worth and reconnect her with her past, Eikichi challenges her to a game of "No Signals" which results in a tie, however it achieves the desired result and she stays on at the school.
| 27 | "GTO – Agent to the Stars" | April 2, 2000 |
Eikichi pushes aside Tomoko's ineffectual manager, GTO, and becomes her manager instead. He arrange a series of innocuous commercials with her advertising fruit and vegetables for local television stations across Japan. The commercials give her a national profile and attracts the attention of a popular magazine who wants her to enter in their Magazine Glossy Princess Contest - MGPC.
| 28 | "Whatever Can Go Wrong, Will Go Wrong" | April 16, 2000 |
Eikichi does whatever he can to ensure that Tomoko will win the contest, including getting bōsōzoku gangs to block vote for her. However the leading contestant, Megumi Hashino, has the backing of a powerful corporation which manipulates the vote counting. Megumi Hashino is declared the winner, but Tomoko is more popular with the crowd who feel cheated and all leave before the end of the ceremony.
| 29 | "Studies in High Finance" | April 23, 2000 |
Miyabi Aizawa becomes frustrated at Urumi Kanzaki's friendship with Eikichi Onizuka. In a plot to have Eikichi fired, Miyabi and her friends blackmail the English teacher, Mr. Sakurada into helping them steal the school's annual class field trip money which was collected by Fujiyoshi. They plant the money on Eikichi and then pressure Mr. Sakurada, into luring Eikichi to a fake "underground girls club" where they get him blind drunk, relieve him of the money and dump him onto a pile of garbage in his underwear.
| 30 | "Money Talks, GTO Walks" | April 30, 2000 |
Fujiyoshi is devastated believing he lost the school's annual class field trip money which he collected, but Eikichi realizes that it was the money left in his room which he then spent on his drunken night out. He promises to make good the loss, meanwhile Fujiyoshi disappears, leaving only a typed suicide note. Urumi Kanzaki deduces that the entire episode was a plot by Miyabi Aizawa to have Eikichi fired, including the fake suicide note from Fujiyoshi. The school's director decides to hold a student assembly so the students can decide Eikichi's fate.
| 31 | "Destination: Okinawa" | May 7, 2000 |
Framed as an embezzler, Eikichi promises to make it up to all of the 3rd year students with a trip to Okinawa. He claims that he can pay for it with a winning lottery ticket (obtained as a collateral from Saejima), but when he finds out that the ticket was a fraud, he has to find another way to pay for the ¥8 million trip.
| 32 | "The Law of Probability" | May 14, 2000 |
Eikichi wins a Mercedes-Benz E-class sedan in a local contest, worth enough to pay for the trip. Unfazed, Miyabi arranges for a suicidal salaryman to jump in front of Eikichi's car and ruin his chances of selling it.
| 33 | "Search and Rescue" | May 28, 2000 |
To teach Miyabi and her friends a lesson, Urumi orchestrates their kidnapping to hold them for ransom. Eikichi literally flies in to save the day and foils Urumi's plans.
| 34 | "Good Cop/Bad Cop" | June 4, 2000 |
When Tomoko, Eikichi, and his friend Toshiyuki Saejima find a suitcase filled with gold, they find themselves on the run from the yakuza.
| 35 | "Wedding Bell Blues" | June 11, 2000 |
When Kunio finds a wedding dress catalog at home, he suspects his mother will marry someone behind his back. Overprotective of his mother, Kunio will stop at nothing to stop her wedding.
| 36 | "Self-Improvement" | June 18, 2000 |
Nao helps Azusa choose a bathing suit for the trip to Okinawa. Azusa tries to get a makeover in order to impress Eikichi, but ends up getting carried away in the process.
| 37 | "Living Together" | July 16, 2000 |
To make it a trip to remember, Eikichi assigns his students to co-ed rooms. Noboru is perplexed with Eikichi's decision to assign him with Anko and her friends. Eikichi helps Noboru make the most of a bad situation with a good old-fashioned prank on the girls.
| 38 | "Great Treasure Okinawa" | July 30, 2000 |
Eikichi learns of a hidden treasure somewhere on one of Okinawa's islands and decides that a special class trip is in order. During the expedition, Anko and her friends tie up Noboru to leave him in the jungle, but end up getting lost in the process.
| 39 | "Alone in the Dark" | August 13, 2000 |
Separated, Anko and Noboru are forced to find their way to safety together. Eikichi, however, believes their disappearance was a ruse to conceal their discovery of the treasure, and searches for them in hot pursuit.
| 40 | "Matters of the Heart" | August 20, 2000 |
Following her ordeal, Anko is conflicted over the new emotions that she feels for Noboru. To teach Anko to be true to her heart, Eikichi plans a special nighttime lesson for the class.
| 41 | "Confessions" | August 27, 2000 |
Eikichi orders his class to walk through a derelict hotel as a test of nerves. Anko and Noboru make it past Eikichi's test, but when confronted by four local hooligans, Anko stands up for Noboru against the bullies and confesses her feelings towards him.
| 42 | "Old Wounds Revisited" | September 10, 2000 |
Miyabi confronts Noboru Saitou, the class's former teacher, about the incident that drove them to hate teachers. When Mr. Saitou is later found stabbed, suspicion immediately falls on Miyabi.
| 43 | "Onizuka's Final Battle" | September 17, 2000 |
Miyabi's friends and teachers work to protect her from the corrupt teachers' union whose pressure on Mr. Saitou over his unprofessional relationship drove his student lover to suicide. Eikichi decides to take the blame for the stabbing to clear Miyabi of any wrongdoing. Azusa also confesses her feelings towards Eikichi.
