= List of Phantom Thief Jeanne episodes =

The episodes of the anime series Phantom Thief Jeanne are based on the manga series of the same name written and illustrated by Arina Tanemura. The anime series is directed by Atsutoshi Umezawa at Toei Animation, written by Sukehiro Tomita, character designed by Hisashi Kagawa with Katsumi Tamegai as chief animation director, and music composed by Michiaki Kato. The first episode premiered in Japan on TV Asahi on February 13, 1999, where it aired for two seasons, comprising 44 episodes, until its conclusion on January 29, 2000.

The series uses four pieces of theme music. For the first 27 episodes, "Piece of Love" by Shazna is used as the opening theme and "Haruka..." (ハルカ...) by Pierrot is used for the ending theme. For the remaining episodes, the opening theme is "Dive into Shine" by Lastier and "Till The End" by Hibiki is the ending theme.

== Episode list ==
=== Season 1 ===
| No. | Title | Airdate |
|---|---|---|
| 1 | "The Phantom Thief with a Notice Card"; Transliteration: "Kaitō wa Yokokujō to Tomo ni" (Japanese: 怪盗は予告状とともに) | February 13, 1999 |
The episode starts off with Maron 'stealing' a painting, and getting chased by police and detectives. When bickering, still fighting from school, Maron and Miyako meet a blue-haired boy after Miyako knocked down boxes and started yelling at whoever left them there. Maron does not like the boy because of what he said to her but Miyako is mesmerized by him. The angel finds out that an artist is wrecking his own paintings because he is possessed by a demon, leaving him a card of when Maron will show up, and wants Maron to help.
| 2 | "The Target Is Family Bond!"; Transliteration: "Target wa Oyako no Kizuna!?" (Japanese: 標的(ターゲット)は親子の絆!?) | February 20, 1999 |
A loving father has been possessed by a demon inside his daughter's painting. Maron, despite reluctant at first, decides to save the family and seal the demon.This is also when Chiaki came in as a transfer student. in the end of the episode we also see some mysterious guy who is later going to show up as Phantom Thief Sinbad.
| 3 | "An Encircling Net! The Whole Student Body Is the Enemy"; Transliteration: "Hōimō! Teki wa Zenkōseito" (Japanese: 包囲網!敵は全校生徒) | February 27, 1999 |
A passionate teacher arranges the entire student body to capture Jeanne after she's been possessed by a demon inside a vase. Maron and Fin are forced to work hard to lure away the students before they could capture the demon.
| 4 | "A Thief's Job Saves a Company, Too?"; Transliteration: "Dorobu Shigoto wa Kigyō mo Sukuu?" (Japanese: 泥棒仕事は企業も救う!?) | March 6, 1999 |
While Maron works hard to capture a demon, an unexpected Thief appears and proclaims himself as "Phantom Thief Sinbad" - Jeanne's rival.
| 5 | "Emergency at the Airport!"; Transliteration: "Airport Hijōkeikai!" (Japanese: エアポート非常警戒!) | March 13, 1999 |
Miyako's father has been assigned to protect a precious pearl. If he loses it, he will be charged for weak security. Maron is torn between her mission and pity for Miyako's father.
| 6 | "The Partner in Crime Is a Mysterious Old Woman?"; Transliteration: "Aibou wa Nazo no Obaachan?" (Japanese: 相棒は謎のおばあちゃん) | March 20, 1999 |
Maron runs into an old, mysterious lady, who appears to be mugged until Fin finds out that she's been making an act to find a suitable partner to steal her son's jewelry, which has been infested with a demon.
| 7 | "Father-Daughter Detective Team! The Final Gamble"; Transliteration: "Oyako keiji! Saigo no kake" (Japanese: 親子刑事!最後の賭け) | March 27, 1999 |
Miyako's father is at the risk of losing his job; he's been assigned to protect a music box. Jeanne manages to find a way to seal the demon without taking the box.
| 8 | "Steal the Melody of Love!"; Transliteration: "Ai no Melody wo Nusume!" (Japanese: 愛のメロデｲを盗め!) | April 3, 1999 |
A young pianist, who Fin has fallen for, has been possessed by a demon hidden within the melody of an ancient piano. Jeanne sends a warning to the pianist, though no one really understands what it means until she steals the piano.
| 9 | "The Heartless Checkmate"; Transliteration: "Hijō no Checkmate" (Japanese: 非情のチェックメイト) | April 10, 1999 |
An old photographer has been possessed by a demon. He is already on the edge of his life, yet he accepts his fate in order to see his deceased daughter again. Jeanne tries to persuade him to live on, but it's no use. Sinbad comes to her rescue and burns down the studio to locate the demon.
| 10 | "The Masked Man! What Is His True Identity?"; Transliteration: "Kamen no otoko! Honmono wa Dare da" (Japanese: 仮面の男!本物は誰だ?) | April 17, 1999 |
A meek boy named Yamato Minazuki, one of Maron's friends, has been possessed by a demon. The demon changes his personality and at first Maron thinks it has changed for the better, but then Yamato's personality turns cold and mean. Jeanne sends a warning, but Sinbad ends up trying to checkmate the painting they think is possessing him... but he's actually possessed by a book and Jeanne takes the "checkmate" for herself.
| 11 | "Ah, the Beautiful Heart of an Officer"; Transliteration: "Aa, Utsukushiki Keimi no Kokoro" (Japanese: ああ、美しき刑事の心) | April 24, 1999 |
There is a series of robberies in town, but there is also the possibility of a demon. The police are faced with a challenge to catch Jeanne and Sinbad or the robber who have all sent their notices at the same time. At the end of this episode Maron finds something in her mailbox.
| 12 | "The Pin Is Mightier Than the Sword!"; Transliteration: "Pin wa Ken Yori mo Tsuyoshi!" (Japanese: ピンは剣よりも強し!) | May 1, 1999 |
In this episode Maron and her friends plan to go to see the play, Romeo and Juliet. But before the show she sees the two actors who are really a couple and notices them fighting. The Petite Claire picks up a demon and Maron realizes that the actor who is playing Romeo has been possessed by a demon. Maron must find a way to save their relationship and the show before Sinbad arrives.
| 13 | "The Thief of Hearts, with a Memory Loss Plant"; Transliteration: "Wasurenagusa no Heart Dorobou" (Japanese: 忘れな草のハート泥棒) | May 8, 1999 |
One morning, a young woman giving away flowers stops Maron and gives her a pot of Forget-me-nots so that her boyfriend (who is studying in Paris) will come to get her. But when the letter arrives saying he is coming for her, she is possessed by the demon inside the post card and Jeanne sends her warning. During the thieving, Jeanne accidentally tells Sinbad (Chiaki) whose letter she is waiting for, her mother and father.
| 14 | "A Wedding Dress Is the Target"; Transliteration: "Target wa Wedding Dress" (Japanese: ターゲットはウェディングドレス花嫁衣裳) | May 15, 1999 |
Maron's gymnast Sensei is about to get married, but when she goes to try on the dress. Her fiance is possessed by the demon inside the dress. He then announces that the wedding is off. Jeanne sends in a warning and manages to "Checkmate" without taking the dress.
| 15 | "Shocking Confession of Love in the Amusement Park!"; Transliteration: "Yūenchi no Shōgeki Kokuhaku!" (Japanese: 遊園地の衝撃告白!) | May 22, 1999 |
Maron's friend is possessed by a demon, again. Maron, Miyako, and Chiaki are invited to go to an amusement park by him. Chiaki and Maron end up separated from the other two and decide to ride the ferris wheel together in order to find the others. A power outage stops the wheel while they are at the top, Fin finds the picture with the demon, and Maron and Chiaki both secretly hop out and try to "Checkmate."
| 16 | "A First Kiss Illuminated by Moonlight!"; Transliteration: "First Kiss wa Gekkō ni Kagayaku!" (Japanese: ファースト初キスは月光に輝く!) | May 29, 1999 |
Miyako, Maron and the rest of the gang, are planning to perform a play for a kindergarten class. The play is a Mix between Little Red Riding Hood and Sleeping Beauty, with Miyako playing the princess and Chiaki playing the prince. At the kindergarten, a small boy causes havoc for them and Maron finds out that his mother has been possessed by a demon. She promises the boy that she will return his mother to normal. So Jeanne sends in her warning and after a miraculous tag team "Checkmate," Jeanne gets what she came for. Later, Sinbad and Jeanne kiss and Sinbad asks her to stop being a Phantom Thief.
| 17 | "Sudden Intimacy! Love's Tempestuous Arrival"; Transliteration: "Kyuu Sekkin! Koi Hurricane Jouriku" (Japanese: 急接近!恋のハリケーン台風上陸) | June 5, 1999 |
On the way to practice Maron and Miyako notice Chiaki with another girl, which happens to be his fiancee. An arranged marriage by his parents, much to Miyako's dismay. Maron is competing against his fiancee in an upcoming gymnast competition, but Maron had injured her leg as Jeanne. The trophy at the competition had a demon within it and Chiaki's fiancee gets possessed. Jeanne and Sinbad send in their warnings. Jeanne manages to "Checkmate" and later Maron wins the competition, but she fears she is losing something.
| 18 | "The Demon Attacks Friendship's Medal"; Transliteration: "Akuma ga Osou Yūjō no Kunshō" (Japanese: 悪魔が襲う友情の勲章) | June 12, 1999 |
A demon happens to be hiding in a gift that Maron gave to Miyako when they were little. When the Demon possesses Miyako, Jeanne must quickly "Checkmate" it before it harms Miyako's body.
| 19 | "Seal! Evidence of Fatherly Love"; Transliteration: "Fūin! Chichi no Ai no Shōmei" (Japanese: 封印!父の愛のあかし証明) | June 19, 1999 |
Chiaki's father shows up and tells Maron and Miyako that Chiaki's family owns a hospital. He also shows Maron an architectural sculpture of an amusement park that her father modeled and named after her, but a demon is possessing it and Maron is forced to "Checkmate." Sinbad rescues Jeanne from a trap, but ends up injured and in return Jeanne saves Sinbad. Afterwards they share little kiss.
| 20 | "The Day Courage and Hope Were Broken"; Transliteration: "Genki ni Yūki ga Kowareta Hi" (Japanese: 元気に勇気が壊れた日) | June 26, 1999 |
Maron starts to become more energetic after she learned that the amusement park model was named after her, but one night Maron gets a call from her mother. After the call Maron gets upset and runs off and Miyako tells Chiaki to find Maron.
| 21 | "Miyako, Shooting Love and Friendship!"; Transliteration: "Miyako, Koi to Yūjō o Utsu!" (Japanese: 都、恋と友情を撃つ!) | July 3, 1999 |
Miyako has a dream where Jeanne is Maron and she keeps thinking about her friendship with Maron and her crush of Chiaki. When Jeanne sends her next warning. Miyako leaves a red mark on Jeanne's right cheek that doesn't wash off for 3 days. The next day Maron comes to school with a bandage over her right cheek and everyone suspects her. Miyako doesn't want to believe it at first, and makes Maron take off her bandage in front of the whole class to prove Maron's innocence as repayment for what Maron has done for her since the day they became friends.
| 22 | "Dive! Double Kaito Death"; Transliteration: "Dive! W(double) Kaitō shisu" (Japanese: ダイブ!W(ダブル)怪盗死す) | July 10, 1999 |
Phantom Thief Jeanne barely escaped Miyako from an earlier "Check Mate", but catches a cold from falling into the ocean. Maron ends up at the hospital that Chiaki's father owns. Now, Chiaki's father is the new target, but for some reason, the a notice is sent to the police reporting that Phantom Thief Jeanne kidnapped Chiaki's father.
| 23 | "Checkmate! The Magical Blue Butterfly"; Transliteration: "Sogeki (Checkmate)! Mashō no Aoi Chō (Blue Morpho)" (Japanese: 狙撃(チェックメイト)!魔性の青い蝶(ブルーモルフォ)) | July 17, 1999 |
Phantom Thief Jeanne sends a notice card saying she will take the "Blue Morpho" a butterfly in Chiaki's fathers large collection that a demon was hiding in and possessed him. But where have all of the missing doctors from the hospital gone?
| 24 | "Luxury Cruise Monkey Panic"; Transliteration: "Gōka Kyakusen Monkey Sōdō (Panic)" (Japanese: 豪華客船モンキー騒動(パニック)) | August 7, 1999 |
The owner of the Grand Marine is said to be able to rule the sea. Phantom Thief Jeanne and Sinbad are forced to sneak on to a cruise liner to retrieve the demon. However, just when they are ready to "Checkmate" the stone disappears in a small blackout. Has another thief entered the show?!
| 25 | "Ghost Story! Haunted Summer School"; Transliteration: "Kaidan! Yūrei Gakkō no Natsu" (Japanese: 怪談!幽霊学校の夏) | August 14, 1999 |
To practice efficiently, the coaches for gymnastics and the soccer team have set up a "resort" for their teams. But the resort is haunted?! On top of that, just when Maron and Miyako are ready to relax, they find out that Chiaki joined the soccer team yesterday and will be spending his vacation with them! If there are demons, is it possible that ghosts could exist as well? Can Phantom Thief Jeanne fight a ghost?
| 26 | "Infiltrate! Mechanical Ninja Castle"; Transliteration: "Sennyū! Karakuri Ninja Jyou" (Japanese: 潜入!カラクリ忍者城) | August 21, 1999 |
This time, the vacation is at a cute little spot that has been transformed to fit the style of the Edo Era. As they enjoy themselves, wearing various costumes mimicking the old style of clothing, a demon has possessed the owner of the place! On top of that, it takes Fin, Miyako, and Iincho hostage. How will Maron transform into Phantom Thief Jeanne without Fin?!
| 27 | "A Tearful Parting-Angel Fin"; Transliteration: "Namida no Owakare Tenshi Fin" (Japanese: 涙のお別れ 天使フィン) | September 11, 1999 |
The Petit Claire is acting strangely. On top of that, Saotome's motorcycle has been possessed by a demon! What good can a motorcyclist be without his motorcycle? With the Petit Claire acting up, what will this latest "Checkmate" cause?

=== Season 2 ===
| No. | Title | Airdate |
|---|---|---|
| 28 | "Advent of the Demon! Time of New Transformation"; Transliteration: "Akuma Kōrin! Shin Henshin no Toki" (Japanese: 悪魔降臨!新変身の時) | September 18, 1999 |
With her powers gone, Maron must find another way to save a boy from an upper-level demon that has infiltrated a statue. She taps into her will to become stronger, and that activates her power to transform again, becoming the upgraded Phantom Thief Jeanne.
| 29 | "Totally Beautiful! The Mysterious Teacher Appears"; Transliteration: "Chō Bikei! Nazo no Sensei Tōjō" (Japanese: 超美形!謎の先生登場) | September 25, 1999 |
One of the high class demons is now posing as Maron's history teacher! The police get to marvel at her return (and her new outfit) as a beautiful angel painting is possessed by a demon! The painting turns from "An Angel of Happiness" to one that is consumed with flames. Will Phantom Thief Jeanne's wings be clipped as well or will Sinbad be able to save her?
| 30 | "Defender, Burning with Renewed Spirit"; Transliteration: "Genki Fukkatsu de Moeru Toushi" (Japanese: 元気復活で燃える闘志) | October 2, 1999 |
This is just too much for a schoolgirl to handle! First, Maron's teacher might have seen her transform from Phantom Thief Jeanne back into Maron! Then, Fin visits, but only long enough to say that Sinbad and Access are summoning demons to their world! For Phantom Thief Jeanne this time, it appears that a live dog is being possessed by a demon, rather than an inanimate object. To make matters worse, the dog is a guide dog for a blind woman that Maron meets. If Phantom Thief Jeanne "checkmates", will the dog disappear forever?!
| 31 | "Phantom Thief Is Doing a Commercial!?"; Transliteration: "Kaitō Tsui ni CM Shutsuen!?" (Japanese: 怪盗ついにCM出演!?) | October 9, 1999 |
Maron and Yamato were invited to be in a TV commercial by a man who is actually tricking people into giving him money. But when this man has been possessed by a Demon, will Phantom Thief Jeanne save this man or fail in the process?
| 32 | "Phantom Thief Jeanne Elimination Order!"; Transliteration: "Kaitō Jeanne Massatsu Shirei!!" (Japanese: 怪盗ジャンヌ抹殺指令!!) | October 23, 1999 |
Miyako's father purchased a new computer for the police station, the Chief called him and talk to him about the computer, but suddenly his gun got possessed by a demon will Phantom Thief Jeanne save him?
| 33 | "Sinbad the Liar!"; Transliteration: "Usotsuki Sindbad!!" (Japanese: 嘘つきシンドバッド!!) | October 30, 1999 |
During a World History class trip to a historic church, a demon takes over a beautiful pipe organ and Maron and Chiaki reveal their feelings for each other. But their mission to catch the demon could blow Sinbad's identity...and Maron's trust in Chiaki.
| 34 | "Confession of Separation! I'm Not Going to Trust Anyone!"; Transliteration: "Betsuri Sengen! Mou Daremo Shinjinai!!" (Japanese: 別離宣言!もう誰も信じない!!) | November 6, 1999 |
Maron has just found out Chiaki's greatest betrayal to her! He is actually Sinbad and first approached her to stop her from being a Phantom Thief by getting her to fall for him. So now, with Maron's heart in chaos, Phantom Thief Jeanne's barrier has weakened making her easy pickings for demons. Can Chiaki prove to her that he loves her?
| 35 | "Jeanne: Revival of the Power of Love!"; Transliteration: "Jeanne Fukkatsu no Love Power!" (Japanese: ジャンヌ復活のLOVEパワー!) | November 13, 1999 |
Chiaki just can't seem to get through to Maron. But with Miyako's and Kanako's help, perhaps Maron's heart will be healed. However, when Myst attacks another person close to Maron, will it be the final straw? Will Maron's heart be close off forever?
| 36 | "Is a Thief an Ally of a Cop!?"; Transliteration: "Dorobō wa Keiji no Mikata ka!?" (Japanese: 泥棒は刑事の味方か!?) | November 20, 1999 |
When Miyako's brother, Subaru, becomes the main target for demonic possession, Miyako's mind is in a whirl of confusion. Suddenly she realizes how all the people Jeanne has stolen from became calm after the robbery, so when Miyako's innocent wish calls forth Jeanne, will Jeanne be able to grant it? Or will Myst be able to prove that human love is so fragile?
| 37 | "A Boy with a Demon's Heart"; Transliteration: "Akuma no Shinzō o Motsu Shōnen" (Japanese: 悪魔の心臓を持つ少年) | November 27, 1999 |
Zen, a boy who's been hospitalized for five years due to a heart condition is being targeted by Noin. Jeanne will simply not stand for this. But this time, his live human heart is the thing being possessed. How can Jeanne checkmate?!
| 38 | "Decision!? Checkmate of Sorrow"; Transliteration: "Ketsudan!? Kanashimi no Fūin" (Japanese: 決断!?悲しみのチェックメイト封印) | December 4, 1999 |
If Phantom Thief Jeanne checkmates, it means death to Zen. Can Maron attain the courage and strength to save Zen from become a demon? Or will Noin get in the way?
| 39 | "Only One Wish! To Father and Mother"; Transliteration: "Negai wa Hitotsu! Chichi to Haha ni" (Japanese: 願いは一つ!父と母に) | December 11, 1999 |
Zen's pure wish to live on his own strength brought bittersweet joy, despite his death. Now, another young girl finds both her parents to be possessed by demons. Can Jeanne save yet another family, when that family happens to be an ambassador's family? Are the police going to stand for Jeanne trying to rob their international guests?
| 40 | "Evil Transformation! Myst's Assault"; Transliteration: "Jaaku henshin! Mist mōkō" (Japanese: 邪悪変身!ミスト猛攻) | December 18, 1999 |
Myst, desperate to kill Jeanne before this mysterious "Queen" gets to her, sets up an elaborate plan to kill her by using her school. Meanwhile, Noin gives her dreams of his memories of Joan of Arc, but with Chiaki being her betrayer. This is so she will feel that she cannot trust anyone. To what lengths will Myst go, to kill Jeanne?
| 41 | "Reunion with Fin! Dramatic Nightmare"; Transliteration: "Saikai Fin!! Gekiba Akumu" (Japanese: 再会フィン!!劇的悪夢) | January 8, 2000 |
It is time for Fin's return and the weather is turning chaotic. Weather enough to create heat strokes during the winter, volcanic eruptions, tornados, and tidal waves galore. Just what is it that Chiaki needs to tell Maron about? And what does it have to do with Fin?
| 42 | "Phantom Thief, Surpass Space and Time!"; Transliteration: "Kaitō, Jikū o Koeru!!" (Japanese: 怪盗、時空を越える!!) | January 15, 2000 |
Fin is evil?! And Maron has been helping the Devil all this time?! Everything is revealed in this episode to everyone. Is Joan of Arc the only one who can help Maron gain her spirit and courage back?
| 43 | "Friendship Destroyed!? Final Battle at the Evil Castle of Ice"; Transliteration: "Yuujō Hōkai!? Mahyō Kessen" (Japanese: 友情崩壊!?魔氷城決戦) | January 22, 2000 |
Miyako has been captured by Fin. Like Joan of Arc, the devil is turning her friends against her. Can Maron save her best friend from a demon without checkmating her? Or can Miyako find and believe in her true self, the self that believes in Maron?
| 44 | "You, Become God's Wind!"; Transliteration: "Nanji! Kamikaze to Nare!" (Japanese: 汝、神風となれ) | January 29, 2000 |
Game End! It's the final episode and it is the battle for earth and Fin's soul! Phantom Thief Jeanne stay strong and serious, matchless and marvelous, energetic and courageous, and must find a way to love herself enough to save Fin from the Devil!
