= List of Turn A Gundam episodes =

Cover of the first Blu-ray volume by Bandai Visual.

== Show Overview ==
Turn A Gundam is a 1999 Japanese mecha drama anime series and the eighth incarnation to Sunrise's long-running Gundam franchise. It was created for the Gundam Big Bang 20th Anniversary celebration and is directed by Yoshiyuki Tomino. It aired on Fuji TV from April 9, 1999, to April 14, 2000. The shows posits a distant future where Earth's technology has regressed to World War I levels. The show's conflict is set up by the planned return of a Moonrace, led by Queen Dianna Soreil who will have to defeat Earth's Militia force.

=== Opening and Closing Theme Songs ===
From episodes 2-38, the first opening theme is "Turn A Turn" (ターンAターン, Tān Ē Tān) by Hideki Saijo while from episodes 1-40 the ending theme is "Aura" by Shinji Tanimura. From episodes 39–50, the second opening theme is "Century Color" by RAY-GUNS while from episodes 41-49 the ending theme is "Tsuki no Mayu" (月の繭; Moon's Cocoon) by Yoko Kanno. For episode 50, the third ending theme is "Kagirinaki Tabiji" (限りなき旅路; The Endless Journey) by Aki Okui.

== Episode list ==
No.	Title	Original release date
1	"Howl at the Moon"; Transliteration: "Tsuki ni Hoeru" (Japanese: 月に吠える)	April 9, 1999
Loran Cehack, Fran Doll, and Keith Lajie land on Earth, and soon part ways. Loran is saved from a wolf attack by Lord Guin Rhineford, then is saved from drowning in a river by Lady Kihel Heim, and is taken to the Heim Estate in the city of Vicinity. Loran is startled by how similar Kihel Heim is in appearance to Dianna Soreil, the Queen of the Moonrace. Loran begins working for the Heim family. At first, he works in the mines but is quickly promoted to being the family's chauffeur, at the request of Guin Rhineford. Loran reunites with Keith Lajie and Fran Doll on a shopping trip to the city of Nocis. They have a clandestine meeting, during which they discuss what they have learned about Earth until now. It is decided that Loran should be the one to look for the FLAT-L06D in which they came to Earth. Although she cannot hear what is being said, Sochie Heim, Kihel Heim's little sister, witnesses the meeting, and, later that night, when the rest of the household is sleeping, Sochie follows Loran, unbeknownst to him, when he goes to dig up the FLAT. Sochie sees Loran excitedly yelling at the Moon, "Earth is a great place! Everyone, hurry and come back!!"
2	"The Coming of Age Ceremony"; Transliteration: "Seijinshiki" (Japanese: 成人式)	April 16, 1999
On the day before the Summer Solstice, the Heim Family attends a parade for the militia in Nocis. During the parade, Loran, Fran, and Keith discuss the impending arrival of the Moonrace on Earth, calling it "The Return." Afterwards, Guin Rhineford offers Loran a job working for Sid in Vicinity. That evening, Loran and Sochie go to their Coming of Age ceremony, while Kihel makes her social debut at a party at Bostonian Castle. During the party, Guin shows Kihel his Wireless communications room, and tells her about the Moonrace's upcoming arrival and the spacenoids demands for territory on Earth. At the height of Loran and Sochie's Coming of Age ceremony, The Return begins, the attacks visible from the ceremony. In response to Dianna Counter's WaDom mobile suits, the rock surface of The White Doll crumbles away, revealing the WD-M01 Turn A Gundam. Loran climbs in to the cockpit, Sochie falling in after him, and successfully fends off Poe Aijee's attack on Vicinity.
3	"After the Festival"; Transliteration: "Matsuri no Ato" (Japanese: 祭の後)	April 23, 1999
The cockpit of the Turn A drops, and Sochie notices a pattern of bruising on Loran's back left there by the pilot's seat. In Nocis, the Moonrace's attacks continue, much to the confusion of Guin Rhineford, who tells Kihel that he has been talking to Dianna Soreil for the last two years. Also confused by this violent turn of events is Keith Lajie, who is desperately trying to help people fleeing Nocis. Sid relays the news about the White Doll to Guin; Guin orders the area around Vicinity to be excavated at once. Back in Vicinity, Loran and Sochie arrive at the destroyed Heim Estate, and find that Lord Heim has been killed in the attack. Sochie lashes out at Loran, blaming him for being too slow, and blames him directly for her father's death. Poe Aijee is ordered to find the "mustached white mobile suit" in order to save herself from a 17-year prison sentence for her actions during The Return. Keith and Loran discuss their mutual reluctance to return to their people, and Keith voices his dream of owning a bread shop somewhere far from any fighting. The two friends promise to make this dream reality. While investigating and examining the cockpit of the Turn A, Loran activates the display unit, and sees Dianna Counter's WaDoms approaching.
4	"Soldiers From Home"; Transliteration: "Furusato no Gunjin" (Japanese: ふるさとの軍人)	April 30, 1999
Poe Aijee and her forces attack; the militia and Loran in the Turn A defend as best they can. Poe's orders are to capture, so upon encountering increasing resistance from the humans, she decides to order a retreat. In Nocis, Kihel informs her mother of her father's death, which causes her mother to collapse. In Vicinity, Miashei gets Sochie out of her depression by telling her the militia needs pilots, and this is her chance to fly. While hiding the Turn A in the forest outlying Vicinity, Loran makes contact with Poe, and returns to Dianna Counter to report. Loran mysteriously faints in the middle of his report, but quickly recovers. He is ordered to accompany Captain Harry Ord to the negotiations to take place at Bostonian Castle, but then is ordered by Captain Phil Ackman to keep his identity hidden, so as to facilitate sabotage on the humans at a later date. The peace talks begin - suddenly, Elder Iru, who is seated next to Guin Rhineford, pulls out a crossbow and kills Dianna Counter's Captain Aji, seated across from him. When Captain Ackman fires at Guin in retaliation, Iru throws himself in the way, saving Guin. The peace talks will continue, but only just barely. Back in the Mountain Cycle, Sid and his crew finally hit the mother lode - a cavern full of mobile suits from the era of the Dark History.
5	"Dianna Descends"; Transliteration: "Diana Kōrin" (Japanese: ディアナ降臨)	May 7, 1999
Kihel Heim and Loran accompany Kihel's mother home on an airship. On the way there, they are told their arrival will be delayed due to the need to detour around a battlefield that has erupted below. Loran notices a familiar plane flying in the skies near the airship - it's Miashei's plane, with Sochie Heim in the pilot's seat. Loran jumps out of the airship, onto Miashei's plane and goes with them. On the battlefield, Poe Aijee confronts Miashei, who is making a futile attempt to break into the cockpit of one of Dianna Counter's mobile ribs, and takes her as a hostage. Kihel Heim, now back at home, notices Sochie in the pilot's seat when she flies by the house. Piloting the Turn A, Loran attempts negotiating for Miashei's release, but when Miashei sees a chance, she makes a break for it. In trying to recapture her, Poe gets the hand of her WaDom, with Miashei in it, sliced off by Loran in the Turn A. This incident has far-reaching effect; Guin Rhineford and Harry Ord are both receiving news of the events in Vicinity, and both accounts are heavily biased, favoring whichever side the story came from. Guin makes plans with Sid over the phone to have the militia's mobile suits ready for the impending arrival of Queen Dianna Soreil. Kihel Heim goes to the Mountain Cycle, thinking to bring Sochie home with her, as she does not approve of Sochie's piloting a Kapool for the militia, but Sochie easily deflects her efforts, saying she will help her mother best by protecting her as a pilot in the militia. In a nearby cabin, Loran desperately tries to get the assembled officers to hear him regarding Queen Dianna, but they ignore him - the plan is to kidnap Dianna Soreil, and hold her until Dianna Counter ceases all attacks. At sunset that day, all forces for both sides are gathered at the airfield, tensely awaiting the arrival of Queen Dianna. The episode ends as Queen Dianna disembarks.
6	"The Forgotten Past"; Transliteration: "Wasurerareta Kako" (Japanese: 忘れられた過去)	May 14, 1999
As Dianna enters Nocis accompanied by Ambassador Miran Rex and Guin, the Militia launch an ineffective ambush against Dianna's Royal Guard. Guin orders the Militia to withdraw from Nocis and a ceasefire is declared. Dianna and Miran negotiate for settlement rights to the Sunbelt Zone of Ameria, but their arguments of a prior claim are met with denial by the Amerian leaders. Militia excavations of Dark History tech continue, and Loran locates the Turn A's armory in Vicinity, but the weapons crumble to dust. Loran, Sochie, and Miashei prevent Poe and Phil Ackman from reaching the main dig site
7	"Training to Be a Lady"; Transliteration: "Kifujin Shugyō" (Japanese: 貴婦人修行)	May 21, 1999
The Militia's strength grows as the dig site yields new discoveries and Inglessan factories begin producing mobile suit parts. Phil urges his colleagues to seek out other sites with buried mobile suits. Dianna proposes a party as a show of goodwill toward the Amerians. Loran attends the party in the guise of "Laura Rolla", who the Moonrace believe is the pilot of the Turn A, to speak with Dianna about her intentions for Earth. Militia soldiers attempt to assassinate Dianna, but fail and escape. Dianna insists negotiations resume. Harry and Miran surmise the would-be assassins were actually Moonrace soldiers in disguise.
8	"Laura's Cow"; Transliteration: "Rōra no Ushi" (Japanese: ローラの牛)	May 28, 1999
Troops from Lousana and Floria arrive to reinforce the Inglessa Militia. The Moonrace seizes land and crops from Inglessan farmers, while tensions between Moonrace civilians and Dianna Counter soldiers emerge as rations run low. Loran, Sochie, Keith, and Fran help a Moonrace family scavenge crops and livestock from abandoned farms. Poe mistakes this for a Militia scheme and attacks, but Harry intervenes. Distraught by the bickering between the people of Earth and the Moon, Loran publicly announces he is a member of the Moonrace, which upsets Sochie.
9	"Corin Shouts, "It's a Gundam!""; Transliteration: "Koren, Gandamu to Sakebu" (Japanese: コレン、ガンダムと叫ぶ)	June 4, 1999
Corin Nander arrives on Earth with handlers Bruno and Jacop, smuggled aboard a Moonrace transport without the knowledge of Dianna Counter officials. Guin allows Sochie to try piloting the Turn A Gundam. Harry suspects Loran Cehack and Laura Rolla are connected. Corin goes on a rampage against the Militia to lure in the Turn A for a battle. Keith offers to sell the FLAT to the Militia to raise money for a bread factory. Sochie confronts Corin and unlocks the Turn A's beam sabers, but her inexperience hinders her ability to fight. Loran takes control and routs the disoriented Corin with a beam saber.
10	"Grave Visit"; Transliteration: "Hakamairi" (Japanese: 墓参り)	June 11, 1999
Dianna apologizes to Guin for the behavior of her troops, explaining that the Dianna Counter vanguard that landed before her had not received any of her orders. She accepts an invitation from Guin to tour the damage to the countryside by airship. Dianna and Kihel bond over their identical appearances, and trade outfits and identities. Loran and Sochie accompany them on the airship to the Heim estate. Dianna is overcome by the revelation that the Return caused the death of Kihel's father and made her mother delusional, and grieves on Kihel's behalf.
11	"The Fall of Nocris"; Transliteration: "Nokkusu Hōkai" (Japanese: ノックス崩壊)	June 18, 1999
Loran uncovers the Turn A's shield at the Militia dig site. The Militia assigns Joseph Yaht to pilot Keith's FLAT, though Joseph aspires to pilot the Turn A. Miran, recognizing Guin is stalling for time, pressures Kihel to relocate the flagship Soleil to claim the Sunbelt. The Militia breaks the ceasefire and assaults the Moonrace encampment, part of a plan to capture the Soleil, but Miran orders the ship to depart for the Sunbelt. Corin singlehandedly destroys most of Nocis, and Guin is forced to flee in disgrace. Phil's squadron attacks the Militia dig site to prevent the Militia from acquiring any more Dark History tech.
12	"Underground Passageways"; Transliteration: "Chika Kairō" (Japanese: 地下回廊)	June 25, 1999
Loran and Dianna fall into a cavern during the Dianna Counter attack. With Nocis fallen, Colonel Michael Gern orders the Militia to regroup in Lousana . Guin meets with his fiancee, Lady Lily Borjarno, to travel to Lousana in order to resume negotiations between the Amerians and Moonrace. Corin stumbles upon Loran in the cavern and attempts to knock the Turn A into a magma lake, but Loran is saved when Dianna exploits Corin's instability and loyalty to Queen Dianna. Although Corin's Eagail is destroyed by the magma, Corin himself survives.
13	"An Older Woman"; Transliteration: "Toshiue no Hito" (Japanese: 年上のひと)	July 2, 1999
Loran and Dianna are directed by Sid to a new potential burial site for Dark History tech in the Kingsley Valley. They encounter Will Game, who Dianna initially confuses for her long-lost lover of the same name, and his wife, the mysterious Teteth Halleh. Will reveals he is a descendant of Dianna's lover, and that he had located an ancient spaceship by following his ancestor's journals. Poe's squadron tracks down the Turn A, but Poe is thwarted by Loran and humiliated by her latest defeat. Will gifts Dianna a feather from the bird his ancestor was seeking when he died, and Dianna weeps for the original Will Game.
14	"Separated, Again"; Transliteration: "Betsuri, Futatabi" (Japanese: 別離、再び)	July 9, 1999
Loran, Sid, and Will enter and explore the ancient ship. The Lousana Militia demonstrates its own Dark History mobile suit unit, the Suicide Squad. Teteth persuades Will to give the Cannon Illefuto he found to Dianna Counter in order to fulfill his goal of traveling to the Moon and proving his ancestor's romance with the Queen. Loran, Sid, and Dianna pursue them. Miran convinces Kihel to declare a new Moonrace territory in the Sunbelt. Harry encounters and defeats a Militia mobile suit patrol led by Sochie and Lousana pilot Gavane Goonny, and critically damages the Turn A before escaping with Will and Teteth.
15	"Fleeting Memories"; Transliteration: "Omoide wa Kiete" (Japanese: 思い出は消えて)	July 16, 1999
While moving to Lousana, Keith and Verlaine Bond find Lily and a feverish Guin stranded on the roadside and assist them in reaching Guin's Winter Villa near the Lousana border. Loran and the Militia rush to excavate the ancient ship before Dianna Counter troops arrive, even as Will becomes a Dianna Counter pilot and leads Poe toward the Kingsley site. Keith provides bread for the joint Militia forces and relays Guin's orders to hire disillusioned Moonrace technicians to Michael. The Militia, assisted by Sochie piloting the Turn A, prevents Poe's squad from reaching Kingsley, but Will is killed in the fighting.
16	"All About Turn A"; Transliteration: "Tān Ē no Subete" (Japanese: ∀の全て)	July 23, 1999
An overview of episodes 1-15 from Loran's perspective.
17	"Dust Blow at the State's Founding"; Transliteration: "Kenkoku no Dasuto Burō" (Japanese: 建国のダストブロー)	July 30, 1999
Keith guides defecting Moonrace technicians to the Inglessa Militia, but Lousana's Suicide Squad causes problems. Kihel sends invitations to Guin to attend the founding ceremony for the Moonrace's Sunbelt fiefdom. Severe storms strike the Dianna Counter's encampment, spooking some of the Moonrace into thinking the people of Earth have cursed them; Kihel prevents a panic. Teteth is revealed to be a Moonrace agent and persuades Bruno and Jacop to help her assassinate Dianna. The assassination attempt fails due to Loran's timely arrival, and Teteth disappears.
18	"Kihel and Dianna"; Transliteration: "Kieru to Diana" (Japanese: キエルとディアナ)	August 6, 1999
Guin ponders the apparent disharmony among the Moonrace. Fearing for her counterpart's safety, Dianna reveals her true identity to Loran. During the founding ceremony, Dianna and Loran seek out Kihel aboard the Soleil, which Teteth also infiltrates as part of her latest attempt to kill Queen Dianna. Teteth fails to complete her mission and escapes once more. Meanwhile, the Militia carries out a surprise attack to disrupt the ceremony. Kihel gives her speech, but unexpectedly declines to claim the Sunbelt in favor of resuming negotiations. The Amerians are buoyed by this turn, but the Moonrace are dismayed.
19	"Sochie's War"; Transliteration: "Soshie no Sensō" (Japanese: ソシエの戦争)	August 13, 1999
The Moonrace technicians take the lead in the Militia's excavation of the ancient ship, now named the Willghem. Guin appoints Loran captain of the newly discovered Gallop hovercraft. Kihel discusses Agrippa Maintainer's dissident faction, who wish to remain on the Moon, with Harry. Poe's squad attacks the Gallop while the Turn A's head is undergoing repairs, and Sochie engages them. Loran defeats Poe again and rescues Sochie, who is sobered by the realization that her reckless actions endangered the group.
20	"Anise Power"; Transliteration: "Anisu Pawā" (Japanese: アニス·パワー)	August 20, 1999
The Moonraces' coup for the sunsphere is understandably not taken well by the people currently inhabiting it, and some, more than others refuse to be led away no matter the consequences. An isolated farmer, Anis, may lose more than just farmland in the growing exchange between the militia and moonrace forces.
21	"Dianna's Hard Fight"; Transliteration: "Diana Funsen" (Japanese: ディアナ奮戦)	August 27, 1999
After receiving news that Dianna Counter plans to attack Kingsley, which may also endanger a nearby military field hospital, Sochie insists on striking the Soleil first, but her plan is rejected. Bruno and Jacop join the Gallop's crew. Kihel learns that Agrippa's faction has not only conducted a coup in Genganam, the Moon's capital city, but is likely also responsible for the attempts on her life as well as the continuing escalation of the war. Dianna enthusiastically volunteers at the field hospital at Lily's suggestion, but is soon swamped with chores. Kihel asks Harry to retrieve Dianna from Kingsley before Phil launches his attack there.
22	"Harry's Misfortune"; Transliteration: "Harī no Sainan" (Japanese: ハリーの災難)	September 3, 1999
Miran gives Phil discretion to prevent more Moonrace technicians from defecting. Kihel surmises Phil wants to destroy the Willghem as an example to discourage more defections. A shipment of weapons from Vicinity arrives at Kingsley for the Turn A. Harry infiltrates Kingsley as a technician and immediately recognizes Dianna as the true Queen Dianna. He is forced to defend the Militia to protect Dianna, who does not wish to return to the Soleil, and the Moonrace technicians when Poe arrives. Loran uses the Turn A's rebuilt beam rifle to defeat Poe, and she and Harry retreat. Guin christens the reactivated and fully excavated Willghem.
23	"Teteth's Last Words"; Transliteration: "Tetesu no Yuigon" (Japanese: テテスの遺言)	September 10, 1999
Kihel covers for Harry's actions at Kingsley. Loran and the Gallop travel to Keith's "Donkey Bakery" for supplies; Teteth and her handler, Meme Midgard, are working there undercover. Gavane is revealed to have proposed to Sochie, but Sochie has not yet accepted. Corin resurfaces at the bakery as a wandering monk. Joseph infers that Fran is from the Moonrace. Teteth hijacks the Turn A to give to Dianna Counter and takes Dianna hostage, but Loran tricks her and knocks her out of the cockpit before she can leave with the Turn A's weapons. In the confusion, Meme shoots Teteth to silence her.
24	"Laura's Howl"; Transliteration: "Rōra no Tōboe" (Japanese: ローラの遠吠え)	September 17, 1999
With the Moonrace's resupply fleet running late, Dianna Counter troops raid Lousana towns and farms for supplies. Sochie decides to accept Gavane's marriage proposal. Kihel asks Harry to locate Guin so that negotiations can resume, as reports indicate Duke Borjarno of Lousana seeks to unite the Amerian militias into a single army. To prove their worthiness to Dianna Counter, Cancer and Muron carry out hit-and-run attacks on the field hospital and various towns with a FLAT thinly-disguised as the Turn A. Loran manages to stop them. Dianna tells Loran that she must return to the Moon in order to end the war.
25	"The Willghem Lifts Off"; Transliteration: "Wirugemu Ririku" (Japanese: ウィルゲム離陸)	September 24, 1999
As a cold snap sets in, final preparations are underway for the first launch of the Willghem. Dianna departs with Corin for the Soleil, and Loran searches for her. Dianna Counter pillages the town of Rudowa, and Fran becomes disheartened after learning that the Lousana press, owned entirely by the Borjarno family, will cover up the incident and not use her photos. Kihel reluctantly orders Phil to disable and capture the Willghem before it can reach the Moon. Loran, Keith, and Fran argue over their chosen paths. Thanks largely to Loran, the Inglessa Militia repels Dianna Counter's assault while the Willghem lifts off and flies to a safer area.
26	"A Battle for Enlightenment"; Transliteration: "Satori no Tatakai" (Japanese: 悟りの戦い)	October 8, 1999
The Militia and Dianna Counter tend to their wounded following the battle at Kingsley. Loran takes the Gallop to continue searching for Dianna. The Moonrace locate a new Dark History burial site and hope to exploit its weapons. Dianna and Corin rest at a village where both Amerians and Moonrace are celebrating the harvest, and Loran catches up to them. Corin is incensed by a parade float resembling the Turn A and tries to destroy it, causing chaos. Dianna and Harry help Loran use the float to trick Corin into believing he has finally beaten the Turn A, after which Corin peacefully returns to his travels.
27	"Midnight Sunrise"; Transliteration: "Yonaka no Yoake" (Japanese: 夜中の夜明け)	October 15, 1999
Dianna departs with Harry for the Soleil. The Moonrace uncover new mobile suits and a cache of nuclear weapons at the Lost Mountain site, but the Suicide Squad stumbles across the excavation. Dianna and Kihel are finally reunited; Dianna asks Kihel to stay on as her decoy while she heads to the Moon via the Sackträger space station. Heedless of the Moonrace's warnings, Gavane seizes most of the nukes and unwittingly activates their fuses. Cancer and Muron enter the fray, followed by Loran. Lieutenant Ralpha Zenoa convinces everyone of the danger in time for them to make a run for it, but not everyone escapes.
28	"The Burden"; Transliteration: "Takusareta Mono" (Japanese: 託されたもの)	October 22, 1999
The nuclear blast kills Gavane and several Moonrace soldiers. Poe is sent to retrieve the remaining two nukes from Zenoa, but he refuses to hand them over and gives them to Loran to dispose of instead. Phil demands Dianna cede her authority to him so that he can use the nukes to conquer the Earth. When Dianna denies him, Phil mutinies. Harry and Kihel flee for Sackträger to confuse Phil into thinking he only has the Queen's decoy. Meanwhile, Zenoa escorts Sochie and Miashei to the Soleil to discuss ending the war due to the nukes, and they are attacked by the ship's guards. Zenoa sacrifices himself to allow Sochie and Miashei to escape.
29	"Two Aboard the Soleil"; Transliteration: "Soreiyu no Futari" (Japanese: ソレイユのふたり)	October 28, 1999
Phil plots with Poe to build a kingdom on Earth with her as his queen. The Willghem lifts off and stops by Hughes Harbor en route to Maniupich, the gateway to Sackträger. Loran and Fran determine the best place to dispose of the nukes is space, and follow the Willghem. Harry and Kihel meet the Willghem, and Kihel tries to prove she is the true Queen of the Moonrace to Guin and the Militia. Poe leads a squad to capture Kihel for Phil, but they are routed by Loran, Harry, and the Willghem's mega-particle cannon. Miran and other loyalists aboard the Soleil release Dianna on the off-chance that she is the real Queen Dianna.
30	"Close to the Heart"; Transliteration: "Mune ni Kakaete" (Japanese: 胸に抱えて)	October 29, 1999
Miran smuggles Dianna to Meme during a test flight of the Soleil's detachable bridge. The Willghem, Gallop, and Lousana Navy prepare for the trip to Maniupich. Michael and Guin remain skeptical that Kihel is who she claims to be, but Lily embraces the charade to boost the Moonrace technicians' morale. Sochie grieves for Gavane. Joseph and Fran are revealed to be dating. Cancer and Muron board the Willghem as it departs, wanting to take the nukes to prevent the Militia from using them against the Moonrace; Guin takes Kihel hostage to bluff them. Loran defeats Muron and Kihel persuades Cancer to leave peacefully.
31	"Pursuit! Crybaby Poe"; Transliteration: "Tsuigeki! Nakimushi Pō" (Japanese: 追撃!泣き虫ポゥ)	November 5, 1999
Phil broadcasts a speech in which he announces Queen Dianna has been kidnapped by the Militia, and declares his intent to form a new Moonrace nation on Earth: the Sunbelt Republic. Poe falls ill, but goes after the Willghem in an Almaiya battleship. Harry searches for the real Dianna and crosses paths with Poe. Meme explains to Dianna that Agrippa needs her in case Phil conquers the Earth and then sets his sights on the Moon. Cancer and Muron spot Dianna on a ship and pursue, and end up helping her and Meme reach the Gendarme sent to pick them up. The Willghem evades Poe, and Loran and Sochie cripple her Almaiya.
32	"The King of Myth"; Transliteration: "Shinwa no Ō" (Japanese: 神話の王)	November 19, 1999
The Militia finds that Moonrace forces have occupied and fortified the mountain Impabura, atop which lie the Adeskan city of Maniupich and the legendary Ades Tree. Loran hesitates to help because the Turn A is still holding the nukes. The Militia encounters Mayalito, a native Adeskan, and her king, Quoatl. Mayalito and Quoatl lead Loran and a group of Amerians through a secret passage to Maniupich to destroy the Moonrace's cannons. They are captured and imprisoned by the other Adeskans led by Taruka, who view Quoatl to be a coward and Loran as an enemy foretold by prophecy because he pilots the Turn A.
33	"The Taking of Manupichi"; Transliteration: "Manyūpichi Kōryaku" (Japanese: マニューピチ攻略)	November 25, 1999
Taruka's followers try to compel him and Quoatl to duel for the kingship, but Joseph and Mayalito help Loran, Quoatl, and the others escape. Mayalito reveals that Taruka challenged Quoatl once before, but Quoatl knew he was not ready to rule and refused to fight; the Adeskans then scorned Quoatl for appearing to flee. The Amerians and Adeskans work together to take out the cannon emplacements, but Quoatl is wounded at the final cannon. The king grants Taruka the right to kill him by shooting the bomb intended for the cannon, and Mayalito chooses to die with Quoatl out of loyalty. The final cannon is destroyed and Maniupich is liberated.
34	"Fly! Into the Stratosphere"; Transliteration: "Tobe! Seisōken" (Japanese: 飛べ!成層圏)	December 3, 1999
The Moonrace prepare the Gendarme bearing Dianna and Meme for its launch into space, while the Militia and Adeskans likewise ready Maniupich's mass driver to launch the Willghem. Harry misses the chance to rescue Dianna as the Gendarme lifts off. Phil refrains from sending more ships after the Militia. Poe attacks the Willghem as it launches, but Loran and the Militia successfully defend the ship. Harry arrives in time to aid Loran and catch a ride on the Willghem, but the added weight of his SUMO throws off the ship's timing. Loran and Harry use their mobile suits to give the Willghem a boost as the Sackträger's rotating spoke nears.
35	"Sackträger"; Transliteration: "Zakkutorēgā" (Japanese: ザックトレーガー)	December 10, 1999
The Willghem safely docks with Sackträger, where the Gendarme is also docked while awaiting the launch window for the Moon. The station crew at the hub ignore the Militia's hails and dispatch their garrison to capture the Willghem. Harry notices the Gendarme and deploys to rescue Dianna while Loran and Sochie seek out the docking controls. When the station guards arrive, Kihel attempts to order them to stand down and release the Willghem. Dianna follows her counterpart's lead, and the two speak together to defuse the situation. The Gendarme departs first, and the station crew, convinced Kihel is Dianna, also allow the Willghem to leave.
36	"Militia Space Showdown"; Transliteration: "Mirisha Uchū Kessen" (Japanese: ミリシャ宇宙決戦)	December 17, 1999
The crew of the Willghem acclimate to zero-gravity. The Militia men get drunk and homesick, and Lieutenant Yanny Oviess hits on the idea of returning to Earth in a wooden barrel. Loran rescues Yanny before he suffers anything more deadly than frostbite. Michael, Yanny, and several other Militia soldiers panic and mutiny to force the Willghem back to Earth. When that fails, they take mobile suits instead, not realizing Earth is too far away. Loran pursues the soldiers and they open fire on him, but their oxygen runs out before anyone is harmed. With everyone back aboard the Willghem, Fran takes a group photo. Michael pines for his family.
37	"Gateway to the Moon"; Transliteration: "Tsuki Sekai no Mon" (Japanese: 月世界の門)	December 24, 1999
Cancer overhears a conversation between Meme and General Gym Ghingham in which they mention assassinating Dianna. Cancer and Muron secretly free Dianna before the Queen can be transferred to Gym's ship, and feign returning to Earth. The trio arrive at Mistletoe, an abandoned Moonrace colony, and notify the Willghem, but Gym intercepts the transmission. Loran and Sochie venture out to Mistletoe to retrieve Dianna. Meanwhile, Harry kidnaps Kihel, with her assent, to offer to Gym as a decoy for Dianna. At Mistletoe, Loran and Sochie come under attack from Ghingham Fleet's Mahiroo Squad, commanded by Sweatson Stero.
38	"Warrior God Ghingnham"; Transliteration: "Sentōshin Ginganamu" (Japanese: 戦闘神ギンガナム)	January 7, 2000
Harry convinces Sweatson that he has rescued Queen Dianna from the Willghem. Loran and Sochie find Dianna, Cancer, and Muron. Kihel and Harry confess their feelings for each other; they also plot to kill Agrippa to end the war. Both Gym's Aspite flagship and the Willghem dock with Mistletoe. Gym, alerted to Dianna's double by Meme, plays along with Kihel's demands to go to the Moon. He locks down Mistletoe and orders its bombardment with Dianna and the Militia still inside. Loran, Dianna, and the others escape, but the fate of the Willghem is unclear. Kihel witnesses Mistletoe's destruction and fears for Dianna.
39	"Shattering an Asteroid"; Transliteration: "Shōwakusei Bakuretsu" (Japanese: 小惑星爆烈)	January 14, 2000
The Willghem blasts its way out of Mistletoe. Mahiroo Squad attacks Loran and the others, but Cancer handles them. Gym and his staff, trained only by simulations, are baffled by the Militia's tactics. Guin convinces them to cease fire and allow the Willghem to travel to the Moon for peace negotiations. Debris from Mistletoe endangers Von City on the Moon. Gym deploys to stop it in the head of the Turn X Gundam; the Turn X and Turn A react to each other. Loran uses the nukes to obliterate the debris, but is knocked to the Moon's surface; Dianna and Sochie follow. Cancer and Muron become adrift in space and celebrate Dianna's return to the Moon.
40	"Sea Battle on the Moon"; Transliteration: "Getsumen no Kaisen" (Japanese: 月面の海戦)	January 21, 2000
Loran, Sochie, and Dianna enter one of the Moon's canals and encounter Loran's childhood friends, Hammett and Dona Roroi. Dianna learns that Agrippa declared martial law on the Moon after she left for Earth and has been suppressing news of the war. Harry confirms Agrippa's other betrayals and informs Kihel. The Turn A and Sochie's Kapool are disguised as a whale to smuggle to Genganam through the canals, but Mahiroo Squad sees through the deception and engages. Using the canal's whales as a distraction, Loran is able to rout Sweatson. Loran's group arrives at Genganam, where the Willghem has already landed.
41	"The Decision to Fight"; Transliteration: "Tatakai no Ketsudan" (Japanese: 戦いの決断)	January 28, 2000
Lauren, Sochie, and Dianna rejoin the crew of the Willghem. Guin, Lily, and Dianna go to the Royal Palace to meet Agrippa, with Dianna acting as Kihel. Loran stays behind to guard the ship, which comes under attack by Mahiroo Squad. The Willghem flies over Genganam to the Royal Palace to use the Moonrace's leadership as a shield. Harry breaks Kihel out of Gym's Aspite and they come across a Dark History excavation. Agrippa recognizes the Turn A and orders Gym to rein in his men; Gym instead orders Sweatson to seize the Turn A. Sweatson threatens to kill the Earth delegation if the Turn A isn't handed over, creating a stand-off.
42	"The Turn X Activates"; Transliteration: "Tān Ekkusu Kidō" (Japanese: ターンX起動)	February 4, 2000
Michael bluffs Mahiroo Squad, threatening to destroy Genganam before surrendering the Turn A. Sweatson engages Loran in combat anyway. Agrippa relays Gym's challenge to Loran: duel the Turn X on the Moon's surface, or risk the lives of Guin, Lily, and Dianna. Harry and Kihel enter the palace, freeing the hostages. Harry reveals Agrippa's actions during Dianna's absence were an effort to purge the Moonrace's aggressive, militaristic members by sending them to Earth. Agrippa flees, revealing the Turn A caused the Dark History's end. Dianna and the others rush to check on the Winter Palace after Gym's recharging of the Turn X causes a city-wide blackout. Loran ventures to the surface and faces Gym in the Turn X.
43	"The Shocking Dark History"; Transliteration: "Shōgeki no Kuro-Rekishi" (Japanese: 衝撃の黒歴史)	February 11, 2000
Gym and his protégé Merrybell Gadget explain the Turn X and Turn A's relationship to Loran as they clash. The Militia invades the Royal Palace. Dianna suspects that Agrippa was being manipulated by Gym all along. Agrippa and Meme pursue the Queen to block her access to the archives. Dianna and Kihel confess when and for how long they switched identities. Harry defeats Mahiroo Squad. The Militia capture Agrippa and Meme. Dianna broadcasts the Winter Palace's archives of the Dark History across the Moon. It is revealed the Turn A destroyed Earth's prior civilization using a nanomachine weapon called "Moonlight Butterfly".
44	"The Enemy Starts Anew"; Transliteration: "Teki, Aratanari" (Japanese: 敵、新たなリ)	February 18, 2000
Agrippa blames Dianna for causing the war, but Kihel argues that the people of Earth would have eventually traveled to the Moon anyway. Riots break out in Genganam. Dianna and Kihel attempt to kill Agrippa, but Meme, swayed by their words, kills Agrippa himself and later escapes. Guin asks Sid to copy the Winter Palace's archives. Gym ends the battle with Loran to study the data gathered on the Turn A. Harry and Sochie protect the Winter Palace and Willghem from a reckless Sweatson, but Meme arrives in a Gendarme and attacks. Enraged, Loran awakens the Turn A's Moonlight Butterfly. Meme panics at the sight, and Harry uses his SUMO to execute him. Dianna placates the rioters and expresses her hope for a new future with Earth.
45	"Guin the Traitor"; Transliteration: "Uragiri no Guen" (Japanese: 裏切りのグエン)	February 25, 2000
Harry and Kihel discuss the burdens she now shares with Dianna. Dianna ends the hibernation program and the first wave of awoken Moonrace arrive in Genganam. The Militia examines mobile suit schematics from the Winter Palace. Gym and Dianna have a tense meeting over control of the Turn X, but Gym relents, unable to be sure if he is dealing with Dianna or her decoy. He encounters Guin upon leaving. As the Militia prepares to return to Earth, Loran is lured aboard the Willghem, which takes off prematurely. Guin reveals his new alliance with Gym; Guin seeks to advance Earth's technology, while Gym has disavowed the Moonrace. Loran and Gym battle, but Loran is outgunned and ejects the Turn A's cockpit, leaving the rest of the unit in Gym's hands.
46	"To Earth Once Again"; Transliteration: "Futatabi, Chikyū he" (Japanese: 再び、地球へ)	March 3, 2000
Loran lands at the Royal Palace to warn Dianna of Guin and Gym's betrayal. The Turn A is fitted with a new cockpit, and Guin and Gym gloat. Lily explains that Guin sought to steal the Moonrace's technology to help him consolidate power over Ameria. Although Dianna's private ships were sabotaged by a detachment of Gym's troops left behind to prevent any pursuit, Harry locates a dismantled Almaiya that can be repaired. Gym's troops learn of this and deploy to destroy it. Harry and Loran destroy the attackers and protect the port. The repaired Almaiya, named the Whales, launches successfully and sets course for Earth.
47	"Ghingnham's Invasion"; Transliteration: "Ginganamu Shūrai" (Japanese: ギンガナム襲来)	March 10, 2000
Mahiroo Squad attacks a Lousana mobile suit factory near Keith's bakery, and Verlaine is injured. As the Whales enters Earth's atmosphere over the South Pole, Lily plans to make an alliance between Ameria's leaders and Dianna. Guin stops by Keith's bakery to enlist the Moonrace technicians working there. Gym's forces attack and occupy Ameria's capital cities. The Whales lands at the bakery, and the Willghem arrives shortly after, causing a battle. Merrybell pilots the Turn A during the battle. Guin reins in Gym's trigger-happy troops and retreats, unwilling to risk losing popular support by attacking fellow Amerians. Keith's bakery is burned down. Loran, Harry, and Sid ponder how to recapture the Turn A.
48	"The Return of Dianna"; Transliteration: "Diana Kikan" (Japanese: ディアナ帰還)	March 17, 2000
Merrybell tests the Moonlight Butterfly on an Amerian town. Rejected by Ameria's leaders, Guin suggests that Gym subdue Dianna Counter with the Turn X and take their supplies. As the resistance broaches an alliance with Dianna Counter, Corin arrives and joins up. Mahiroo Squad assaults the Soleil, now at Nocis. While the Whales goes to assist the Soleil, Loran, Joseph, Fran, and Sochie board the Willghem to confront Guin. Guin refuses to back down; the resistance members escape, and Joseph takes the Turn A. Dianna Counter ambushes Ghingham Fleet, which is forced to retreat when the Whales attacks from behind. Phil and Miran submit to Dianna, who orders Dianna Counter to war against Ghingham Fleet.
49	"Moonlight Butterfly"; Transliteration: "Gekkou-Chō" (Japanese: 月光蝶)	March 24, 2000
Merrybell and Sweatson tear through Dianna Counter forces in various battles. Joseph pilots the Turn A and refuses to return it to Loran. Guin and Gym plan to drive the Soleil out of Nocis, but Michael has doubts. Corin acquires a custom Kapool. The battle begins, with both sides suffering heavy casualties. Gym deploys in the Turn X to kill Dianna, but is interrupted by Joseph in the Turn A. Gym kills Sweatson for interfering. Loran, Harry, Poe, and others come to Joseph's rescue. One of Gym's shots severely damages the Willghem. While the original cockpit is reattached to the Turn A, Gym activates the Turn X's Moonlight Butterfly to break free from the Royal Guard. After Gym defeats both Harry and Poe, Loran finally engages him in the Turn A.
50	"Golden Autumn"; Transliteration: "Ōgon no Aki" (Japanese: 黄金の秋)	April 14, 2000
While Dianna Counter's ships suppress Ghingham Fleet, Soleil and the Whales follow Loran. The Willghem crash lands, and Michael and the Militia abandon Guin. Loran and Gym face-off at Lost Mountain, and Gym explains his plan to wipe out civilization and build his own world. They battle, and both Turns activate Moonlight Butterfly. Corin defeats Merrybell and tries to stop the Turn X, but is killed. Dianna uses the Soleil to contain the Moonlight Butterfly. The Turns deal fatal damage to each other; Loran and Gym eject and briefly duel with swords, but the Moonlight Butterfly envelops Gym with the Turns in a cocoon. The war ends and time passes. Dianna and Kihel switch identities one final time. The Moonrace and Amerians begin rebuilding together, with Lily playing a prominent role. Kihel departs for the Moon with Harry in a redesigned Willghem to rule as Queen Dianna. Fran and Joseph raise a family. Keith and Verlaine open a new bakery. Guin and Merrybell go into exile. Loran leaves Sochie to care for Dianna in a cabin in the countryside.
