= List of Angel Links episodes =

Angel Links is an anime series produced by Sunrise and directed by Yūji Yamaguchi. It is a spin-off of the anime adaptation of Takehiko Ito's Outlaw Star, which was also produced by Sunrise. Angel Links follows the principal character Li Meifon, the head of a pro bono organization dedicated to protecting outer space transportation vessels from pirates.

The 13 episodes that are comprised by Angel Links originally aired on Japan's Wowow television network from April 7 to June 30, 1999. Bandai Visual released the series on DVD in Japan in seven separate volumes from August 25, 1999, to March 25, 2000. A DVD box set containing the entire series was published on July 28, 2006. Yet another box set titled "Emotion the Best: Seihō Tenshi Angel Links" was released in Japan on September 24, 2010. The anime was later licensed for English language distribution in North America by Bandai Entertainment. It was initially released in this region on DVD in four separate volumes and was later compiled into a "Complete Collection" box set on July 1, 2003. Finally, the series was re-released in a box set as part of Bandai's "Anime Legends" label on April 25, 2006.

The musical score of Angel Links was composed by Toshihiko Sahashi. The series features one opening theme, "All My Soul" by Naw Naw, and one closing theme, "True Moon" by Riwako Miyawara.

== Episodes ==
No.	Title	Original release date
1	"Guardian Angel"; Transliteration: "Ten Kake Ru Tenshi" (Japanese: 天駆ける天使)	April 7, 1999
The episode starts out with the Angel Links rescuing a cargo ship from a bunch of petty pirates using small grappler ships. After causing the pirates to flee, Mei-Fon uses the Links Cannon to turn them into space dust. Back on their base planet, Orashion IV, the officers of the Angel Links are welcomed at a party
2	"A Wasted Fairy Tale"; Transliteration: "Haki Tame no Meruhen" (Japanese: 掃き溜めのメルヘン)	April 14, 1999
As many wealthy people court the favor of Mei-Fon and her crew, we get to meet the first obvious villain of the series, Gordon Hoi.
3	"The Proud Dragon"; Transliteration: "Hokori Takaki Ryuu (Doragon)" (Japanese: 誇り高き龍（ドラゴン）)	April 21, 1999
While Mei-Fon tries to bury her anger at Gordon Hoi's annoying words, the viewpoint changes to that of a ship that is being hijacked.
4	"LiEF〜Living Ether Flier〜"	April 28, 1999
Back at the party, the crew receives a ransom message from the hijackers stating their demands. They are holding Leon Lahn and a young girl. (Leon was supposed to be at the party.)
5	"The Rain upon the Stars"; Transliteration: "Hoshi ni Furu Ame" (Japanese: 星に降る雨)	May 5, 1999
Kosei is a major playboy (he keeps running into former girlfriends, including one who looks a lot like Iris, the waitress from Outlaw Star) and that he's quite a hottie when he's not being Meifon's lapdog and personal tea-server.
6	"Crossroads"; Transliteration: "Kurosurōdo" (Japanese: クロスロード)	May 12, 1999
Head back in time a bit to see how the Angel Links got started, including the death of Meifon's grandfather and his decree that she should take over the company and start up a free security agency, as well as how all the crew came together.
7	"The Angel and the Fallen Angel"; Transliteration: "Tenshi to Datenshi" (Japanese: 天使と堕天使)	May 19, 1999
Back to the present, following Meifon on a date with Leon Lau, the mysterious (and handsome) philanthropist who's taken an interest in her.
8	"My Ship"; Transliteration: "Bokuno Machi (Fune)" (Japanese: ぼくの街（ふね）)	May 26, 1999
Meifon drags Kosei into a den of beggar-pirates who've stolen a shipment right out from under her nose, and although she seems to be a bit of a fluff head sometimes.
9	"A Pheasant Chooses Its Tree"; Transliteration: "Ryou Kin Taku Ki (Ryoukinhakiwoerabu)" (Japanese: 良禽択木（りょうきんはきをえらぶ）)	June 2, 1999
Valeria's turn for a bit of attention, revealing some of her past when an ex-boyfriend in the Einhorn military shows up to try and win her back, while collecting information on Angel Links in the meantime.
10	"The Ones Who Were Left"; Transliteration: "Nokosa Reshi Mono Tachi" (Japanese: 遺されし者たち)	June 9, 1999
Meifon meets an old friend of her grandfather's, and the truth about Grandpa, Leon Lau, and Meifon finally comes out.
11	"At the Binary Interval"; Transliteration: "0 to 1 no Hazama De" (Japanese: 0と1の狭間で)	June 16, 1999
A deal primarily with Meifon's breakdown, but more information is given regarding the relationship between Chenho (Meifon's grandfather) and Goryu/Leon, and their connection to Meifon.
12	"All My Soul"	June 23, 1999
Final confrontation between Goryu/Leon and Meifon, and there is even a small piece of the Meifon puzzle left to be revealed.
13	"Fragment of An Angel"; Transliteration: "Tenshi Nokakera ..." (Japanese: 天使のかけら・・・)	June 30, 1999
Final confrontation between Goryu/Leon and Meifon, and there is even a small piece of the Meifon puzzle left to be revealed.
