= List of Steel Angel Kurumi episodes =

Steel Angel Kurumi is a 1999 to 2001 Japanese anime series that was released in conjunction with a manga series of the same name. Consisting of two television series and two original video animation (OVA) series, Steel Angel Kurumi was directed by Naohito Takahashi with scripts from Naruhisa Arakawa and produced by Oriental Light and Magic. Pony Canyon provided the music production and distribution for the series. The first television series consists of 24 episodes and was broadcast on the private satellite network WOWOW from October 5, 1999, to April 4, 2000. It was followed by a four-episode OVA series titled Steel Angel Kurumi Encore which was released between January 7, 2000, and March 1, 2000. The second television series, set 75 years after the first series, was broadcast on the Japanese networks TV Kanagawa, Chiba TV, Teletama, and SUN-TV from April 12, 2001, to June 28, 2001, for a total of 12 episodes. A second three-episode OVA series, titled Steel Angel Kurumi Zero, was released between April 18, 2001, and June 20, 2001.

== Episodes ==
=== Television series ===
==== Steel Angel Kurumi ====
No.	Title (English / Original)	Original release date
1	"The Activation" / "Kurumi Stands on Solid Ground!"; Transliteration: "Kurumi Daichi ni Tatsu desuu!" (Japanese: くるみ大地に立つですぅ!)	October 5, 1999
Nakahito Kagura and a few friends of his decide to investigate an abandoned house and since Nakahito's family has a history of magic, they decide that Nakahito should go with them to take care of the rumoured mad-scientist living there. Meanwhile the army restricts access to the area. The boys sneak past the guards and Nakahito is sent inside the house. While searching for around, stumbles upon a life-size doll. When a small earth quake causes the doll to fall forward onto Nakahito their lips meet and Kurumi comes to life.
2	"A One-Master Kinda Gal" / "Only One Master For Me!"; Transliteration: "Goshujin-sama wa Hitori desuu!" (Japanese: ご主人様は一人ですぅ!)	October 12, 1999
Dr. Amagi attempts to coerce Dr. Ayanokoji into working with the Japanese military. When Amagi mistakenly grabs Nakahito, Kurumi rescues him. Nakahito and Dr. Ayanokoji discover they have another mutual associate. Kurumi displays jealousy when Nakahito hugs Kamahito. Dr. Ayanokoji and Kamahito misunderstand Nakahito's explanation of Kurumi's activation. Kurumi continues to question why she should proffer any significance to Dr. Ayanokoji. Dr. Amagi discovers another secret within the mansion
3	"Cold Saki" / "New Angel, Saki!"; Transliteration: "Aratanaru Tenshi Saki!" (Japanese: 新たなる天使・サキ!)	October 19, 1999
A new character by the name of Dr. Brandow joins the Imperial Army, and even more interesting it seems as though he has been previously part of the Steel Angel Project. Meanwhile, Nakahito must now become accustomed to rude awakenings, while Dr. Ayanokoji is convinced the Imperial Army will not be able to awaken the second Steel Angel prototype, but he is unaware of Dr. Brandow's contribution. All of this, of course, means nothing to Kurumi, who is agitated with boredom as Nakahito refuses to give her an order. When he finally does, however, it leads both himself and Kurumi to trouble.
4	"Don't Hate Me!"; Transliteration: "Kirai ni Naranaide desu!" (Japanese: 嫌いにならないでです!)	October 26, 1999
The Imperial Army's preparation for the second Steel Angel's completion draws closer, during which Nakahito finds himself haunted by the words of Dr.Ayanakoji stating that only Nakahito has control over Kurumi. To make matters worse Nakahito is visited by some familiar characters, the end result leaving Nakahito even more confused and Kurumi afraid that her beloved master hates her. As though we thought things could not get much worse it seems the newly activated Saki is well on her way to causing trouble for Kurumi
5	"Warm Saki" / "I Have a Kid Sister Now!"; Transliteration: "Imōto ga Dekita desuu!" (Japanese: 妹ができたですぅ!)	November 2, 1999
As Kurumi finds herself forced into battle with Saki, she hesitates, giving Saki the upper hand. In an effort to help, Nakahito seems to just make things worse and discovers that his words put Kurumi in this dilemma. As the fight continues it seems as though no one can help against the wrath of Saki. What will be the final outcome?
6	"Love Shack" / "Sisterly Love"; Transliteration: "Ai Shimai" (Japanese: 愛姉妹)	November 9, 1999
The battle between Kurumi and Saki continues with Kurumi losing badly. As Saki is about to finish Kurumi, she keels over. Dr. Amagi appears and explains that Saki was awakened by electroshock and not completely functional. The only way to completely awaken a steel angel is with a kiss. To awaken Saki to her full potential, somebody has to volunteer
7	"Playing Doctor" / "No, Not There!"; Transliteration: "Soko wa Dame desuu!" (Japanese: そこはダメですぅ!)	November 16, 1999
The group's trip to Izumo comes to a halt when Nakahito gets a stomachache. So, Kurumi, Nakahito, and Amagi go see a doctor, but this doctor is not your normal kind of doctor.
8	"Tsunami" / "Reiko Amagi, 23 Years Old?"; Transliteration: "Amaki Reiko Ni-jū San-sai?" (Japanese: 天城礼子二十三歳?)	November 30, 1999
Kurumi wants to hurry up and get to the city to spend some time with Nakahito, but the train tracks are blocked by a huge boulder. Amagi forbids Kurumi from moving the boulder to keep from drawing unwanted attention. But after a day of waiting, the army still can't move it...
9	"Fireworks" / "Fireworks Just for the Two of Us!"; Transliteration: "Futari de Hanabi desuu!" (Japanese: ふたりで花火ですぅ!)	December 7, 1999
Dr. Amagi reports back to the general and is relieved of duty. Kurumi and her new 'little sister' Saki, repair the damage done by their battle. Yoshiko Koganei and Eiko Kichijoji are assigned by the general to secretly keep an eye on Kurumi and help out if needed. The group spends a night at a fireworks festival, but the sparks really fly when Nakahito is kidnapped and Kurumi sets off to find him.
10	"Triple Threat" / "We Came for You"; Transliteration: "Mukae ni Kitanda" (Japanese: 迎えに来たんだ)	December 14, 1999
Kurumi finds herself fighting Nakahito's kidnappers, the Steel Angels Kaga, Tsunami, and Kaori.
11	"Cinnamon Cookies" / "I Know! Cinnamon Cookies..."; Transliteration: "Sōda! Yattsu-bashi o..." (Japanese: そうだ!八つ橋を...)	January 4, 2000
A couple of incidents get Kurumi thinking that there is something going on between Nakahito and Saki.
12	"I'm Kalinka!" / "Kalinka"; Transliteration: "Karinkada yo!" (Japanese: カリンカだよ!)	January 11, 2000
Kurumi, Nakahito, and Dr. Amagi go to Kyoto to find Saki, who is beaten badly by another new Steel Angel, Karinka.
13	"Second Sister" / "I Got Another Kid Sister"; Transliteration: "Mata imōto ga Dekita desuu" (Japanese: また妹ができたですぅ)	January 18, 2000
Recovering from an ambush, Saki fights back. The next morning, Kurumi and company notice Saki is missing and Kurumi senses that she is in trouble. They go looking for her, guided by Kurumi's custom angel heart.
14	"It's Not Fair" / "I Won't Give Up!"; Transliteration: "Akiramenai Mon!" (Japanese: 諦めないもん!)	January 25, 2000
15	"Dark Wings" / "I Got It, Sis"; Transliteration: "Wakatta yo Onē-chan" (Japanese: わかったよお姉ちゃん)	February 1, 2000
16	"Our Lips Are Sealed" / "Nakahito's Greatest Danger!?"; Transliteration: "Nakoudo Saidai no Kiki!?" (Japanese: 仲人最大の危機!?)	February 8, 2000
17	"Mikhail" / "We've Arrived in Izumo!"; Transliteration: "Izumo ni Tsuita desuu!" (Japanese: 出雲に着いたですぅ!)	February 15, 2000
18	"Lies" / "That Can't Be True!"; Transliteration: "Son'na no Usoda!" (Japanese: そんなのうそだ!)	February 22, 2000
19	"Storming the Base" / "Charge! Academy Base"; Transliteration: "Totsunyū! Akademī Kichi" (Japanese: 突入!アカデミー基地)	February 29, 2000
20	"Avenging Angel" / "The Ultimate Super Steel Angel"; Transliteration: "Kyūkyoku no Chō Kōtetsu Tenshi" (Japanese: 究極の超鋼鉄天使)	March 7, 2000
21	"When Angels Die" / "The Day an Angel Disappeared"; Transliteration: "Tenshi ga Kieta hi" (Japanese: 天使が消えた日)	March 14, 2000
22	"Hell's Angel" / "Chaos Angel"; Transliteration: "Kaosu Enzeru" (Japanese: カオスエンゼル)	March 21, 2000
23	"Crime and Punishment"; Transliteration: "Tsumi to Batsu" (Japanese: 罪と罰)	March 28, 2000
24	"Kiss" / "A Miracle that Starts with a Kiss"; Transliteration: "Kiss Kara Hajimaru Miracle" (Japanese: KissからはじまるMiracle)	April 4, 2000

==== Steel Angel Kurumi 2 ====
No.	Title	Original release date
1	"Things That Suck, Squeeze!"; Transliteration: "Hani Hani Kyuiin desu!" (Japanese: はにはにきゅいーんです!)	April 12, 2001
Nakahito's great granddaughter Nako Kagura is a girl skilled in playing the cello. One day, she and her friend Uruka go down a cavern, which has a statue containing Steel Angel Kurumi Mark II!
2	"Master is a Girl"; Transliteration: "Goshujin-sama wa Onna no Ko desu" (Japanese: ご主人様は女の子です)	April 19, 2001
Kurumi is released from her capsule after so many years and kisses her new master who just happens to be a girl...Nako's mother welcomes Kurumi with open arms and helps her get an outfit for Kurumi as she will be joining her new master at school, which someone close to Nako is not happy about
3	"The First...It Is?"; Transliteration: "Hajimete no...desu" (Japanese: 初めての...です)	April 26, 2001
Kurumi and Nako arrive (late) at Nako's public school. The two's odd relationship gives them unwanted attention from the other students, especially when Uruka's dad sends a robot after Kurumi; causing chaos around the school campus.
4	"The New Steel Angel Saki Mark II"; Transliteration: "Aratanaru Kōtetsu Tenshi Saki 2-shiki" (Japanese: 新たなる鋼鉄天使・サキ2式)	May 3, 2001
Uruka's father discovers a Steel Angel just like Kurumi named Saki II. Uruka snoops around Nako's house to find the manual on how to activate the Steel Angels.
5	"Master and Sister"; Transliteration: "Goshujin-sama to Nē-san to" (Japanese: ご主人様と姉さんと)	May 10, 2001
Now that Steel Angel Saki Mark II has been activated, Uruka tries to make her fight against Kurumi at school.
6	"Kurumi Becomes a Fish"; Transliteration: "Kurumi, o Sakana ni Naru desu" (Japanese: くるみ、おサカナになるです)	May 17, 2001
Kurumi and the gang spend summer at the beach. But Uruka sets a trap for Kurumi in the water.
7	"Awaken, Karinka Mark II"; Transliteration: "Kakusei, Karinka 2-shiki" (Japanese: 覚醒、カリンカ2式)	May 24, 2001
Kurumi and Uruka worry when Nako is late for dinner. Meanwhile, many practitioners in a cave-like temple attempt to awaken the next Steel Angel, Karinka Mark II.
8	"How Do Ya Do, Sistaz?"; Transliteration: "Hajime Mashite, Onē-chan zu" (Japanese: 初めまして、お姉ちゃんズ)	May 31, 2001
Saki tries to get Kurumi and Uruka to be with her, but ends up being used as bait set up by the newly-activated Karinka Mark II.
9	"Part Rain, Part Shine, and a Rainbow"; Transliteration: "Ame nochi Hare nochi Niji desu" (Japanese: 雨のち晴れのち虹です)	June 7, 2001
Kurumi finds herself and Saki battling the powerful Steel Angel Karinka.
10	"Big Part-time Job Plans!"; Transliteration: "Arubaito dai Sakusen desu!" (Japanese: アルバイト大作戦です!)	June 14, 2001
Kurumi and Karinka get in an argument and accidentally break Nako's cello. So, while Nako practices her cello skills with many other cellos at Uruka's house, Kurumi and Karinka get part-time jobs to buy a new cello for Nako.
11	"Master Will Go Away"; Transliteration: "Goshujin-sama ga Inaku Naru desu" (Japanese: ご主人様がいなくなるです)	June 21, 2001
Nako's music contest is coming soon, and if Nako wins, then she will get to study abroad in Vienna. Kurumi and Karinka contemplate on how to feel about Nako going away. Meanwhile, Uruka persuades her father to use a special suit to prevent Nako from leaving her sight
12	"Beyond the Clear Blue Sky"; Transliteration: "Sunda Aozora no Mukō ni" (Japanese: 澄んだ青空の向こうに)	June 28, 2001
Can Kurumi keep Karinka and the battle-suit-equipped Uruka at bay and make it to the cello contest before Nako's turn comes up?

=== Original video animations ===
==== Steel Angel Kurumi Encore ====
No.	Title	Release date
25	"Saki Becomes a Star"; Transliteration: "Saki-chan Sutā ni Naru" (Japanese: サキちゃん・スタアになる)	July 19, 2000
26	"Karinka, A New Love!"; Transliteration: "Karinka Aratanaru Koi!" (Japanese: カリンカ・新たなる恋!)	August 2, 2000
27	"Kurumi, Become an Adult..."; Transliteration: "Kurumi Otona ni Natta desu..." (Japanese: くるみ・オトナになったです...)	September 6, 2000
28	"The Eternal Steel Angel"; Transliteration: "Eien no Kōtetsu Tenshi" (Japanese: 永遠の鋼鉄天使)	October 4, 2000

==== Steel Angel Kurumi Zero ====
No.	Title	Release date
1	"Angel Force"; Transliteration: "Enzeru Fōsu" (Japanese: エンゼル・フォース)	April 18, 2001
2	"Angel Smile"; Transliteration: "Enzeru Sumairu" (Japanese: エンゼル・スマイル)	May 16, 2001
3	"Angel Heart"; Transliteration: "Enzeru Hāto" (Japanese: エンゼル・ハート)	June 20, 2001
