= List of Genshiken characters =

This is a list of characters that appear in the manga and anime series Genshiken.

== Main characters ==
Note: the Genshiken members' favourite manga, anime, and games are non-existent parodies of actual manga, anime and games. For instance, Sasahara is a fan of the game The Champ of Fighters (CoF), a parody of The King of Fighters (KoF). Occasionally a real series is mentioned in the manga that is fictionalized in the anime, and vice versa. (Biographical information is from Volume One of the Genshiken manga and the Genshiken Official Data Book.)

- Kanji Sasahara (笹原 完士, Sasahara Kanji)

Voiced by: Takanori Ōyama (Season 1 and 2), Tatsuya Kobashi (Second Generation) (Japanese); Michael Perreca (English); Thomas Guitard (French)
The third president of Genshiken. At first in denial about his otaku nature, Sasahara eventually accepts and embraces it. He loves hentai PC games despite not owning a computer until volume 3. When Sasahara assumes the title of Genshiken president from Madarame, his first decision is to push the club's initiative, and establish their own booth at Comic-Fest. While Sasahara is pretty much the "normal" otaku, his unwavering loyalty to a single character (Kujibiki Unbalance character Ritsuko Kübel Kettenkrad a.k.a. "The Chairman") makes him stand out from the others. Even the dōjinshi created by Genshiken under his leadership is a Ritsuko-themed one. Sasahara gives up being president during his senior year in order to focus on studying and finding a job, and passes the title on to Ohno. While Sasahara starts off as a quiet, reserved member of Genshiken, he transforms into a somewhat stronger-willed individual, especially during his presidency. While not completely confident in himself, he is able to find a job as a manga editor and even fight back his own doubts in order to confess his feelings for Ogiue. Sasahara also helps Ogiue by providing criticism and being an unofficial editor for her work in general, despite the possible risk to their relationship.

- Makoto Kōsaka (高坂 真琴, Kōsaka Makoto)

Voiced by: Mitsuki Saiga (Season 1 and 2), Momoko Ohara (Second Generation) (Japanese); Kenneth Miller (English, as Kenneth Robert Marlo); Remi Caillebot (French); Sebastian Schulz (German)
Unusually handsome and cute, Kousaka is actually one of the most hardcore otaku in Genshiken. He loves hentai games and is undefeatable when it comes to video games, particularly the fighting genre. As Saki's boyfriend, Kousaka is largely responsible for Saki learning to be patient when it comes to dating an otaku. Kousaka can be considered the exception to the rules of stereotypical otaku, as he is able to juggle fashion with an otaku lifestyle, though after getting a job programming for a porn game company, even Kousaka cannot completely keep up with such a hectic schedule. Kousaka is easy-going and never loses his temper, a trait portrayed by the constant smile on his face. However, he can be rather forceful when the need arises, particularly when it comes to keeping Saki from avoiding her promises. Kousaka, while fashionable, is not afraid to try new things. In order to help sell Genshiken's dōjinshi, he dresses up as Izumi from Kujibiki Unbalance, a female character with a very short skirt (Tokino in the Genshiken 2 anime).

- Saki Kasukabe (春日部 咲, Kasukabe Saki)

Voiced by: Satsuki Yukino (Season 1 and 2), Rina Satou (Second Generation) (Japanese); Carol Jacobanis (English); Genevieve Doang (French); Esra Vural (German); Ariadna Jimenez (Spanish)
Kousaka's girlfriend. Fashionable, violent, confident, occasionally smokes, and not at all attracted by the sexual charms of anime characters, Saki is not an otaku in any sense of the word. She follows Kousaka into Genshiken, and is eventually blackmailed by the first Genshiken chairman into joining the club. Surprisingly, Saki actually saves Genshiken from being shut down on two separate occasions, though her motives have more to do with revenge and guilt than becoming more of an otaku.
Despite being vehemently against otaku activities such as wearing nekomimi (cat-ears) at the start of the series, Saki eventually becomes comfortable with the other club members to the point that eventually she is considered their close friend (aside from the possible exception of Kuchiki). Saki has a tendency to use nicknames. She calls Sasahara "Sasayan", Kugayama "Kugapii", and Ogiue "Ogichin" by nicknames, and even though she at first refuses to call Kuchiki by his self-appointed nickname ("Kuchii"), Saki starts using that nickname as well. She later becomes an entrepreneur in developing her own fashion line.

- Harunobu Madarame (斑目 晴信, Madarame Harunobu)

Voiced by: Nobuyuki Hiyama (Season 1 and 2), Kazuyuki Okitsu (Second Generation) (Japanese); Bill Timoney (English, as Billy Regan); Bruno Meyere (French)
The second president of Genshiken, Madarame is personally chosen by the first Genshiken president to be his successor, though Madarame shows the most leadership and initiative even ally appointed as president. He is a Gundam fan and arguably the most hardcore otaku out of all of Genshiken. Madarame buys dōjinshi without even looking at the price tags, something that occasionally leaves him with very little spending money on basic necessities such as food (his sushi of choice is bacon sushi mayonnaise, cheap at 50 yen a piece). Madarame takes pride in everything that he purchases. The Official Genshiken Data Book's otaku quiz section calls the highest level of otaku "Madarame".
Madarame's loud and adamant support of his own otaku lifestyle initially makes him Saki's nemesis in Genshiken, but as Madarame develops a crush on Saki it heavily influences his interactions with her. However, even after graduating and getting a job at Sakura Pipe Repair thanks to his "computer literacy" (i.e. experience with porn games) Madarame never admits his feelings to Saki as he does not want to risk ruining their friendship. In the relaunch of the manga, Madarame still drops by the Genshiken clubroom for lunch. In order to help the crossdressing Hato be able to come to the clubroom as a girl while attending classes as a male, Madarame agrees to allow Hato use his apartment to change since it is very close to the school. Hato invites Madarame to their upcoming school festival, but soon finds out that his crush Saki will be there with her boyfriend Kousaka. When Madarame arrives at Genshiken's cosplay event he talks to Hato who is internally debating on whether to tell him that Saki is visiting. Soon Saki does show up and brings up a memory about Genshiken finding S&M in one of his drawers while they were at his home. He then claims that 2D girls are the only type of girls for him, but then remembers about the cosplay photos of Saki he has hidden. Here he falters a bit to everyones surprise, Hato then lets out a "oh" because he saw them when they fell from behind the table. Keiko then hatches a plan to get Madarame to confess to Saki. With a little help from Hato they succeed in getting them alone together in Genshiken's clubroom. There Madarame confesses to Saki rather weirdly, but she understands him and politely refuses his feelings. Later he quits his job to "try out being a loser." Keiko confronts him in the clubroom claiming that the only reason why he got a job close by was because Saki was still a student at the university. She speculates that he first wanted a job close to the uni so he could drop by Genshiken now and then and potentially cross paths with Saki, but now that Saki has moved on he has no need for such a job. In the manga, he eventually gains popularity and develops a harem of girls that seek his affection (Angela, Sue, and Keiko), but at the end he confesses and pursues a relationship with Sue.

- Souichirou Tanaka (田中 総市郎, Tanaka Sōichirō)

Voiced by: Tomokazu Seki, (Season 1 and 2), Takayuki Kondou (Second Generation) (Japanese); Bill Rogers (English); Damien Da Silva (French); Dennis Schmidt-Foss (German)
Of the three original upperclassmen, Tanaka's personality is more neutral than the others. He is generally not as eager to rant as Madarame, but is more comfortable with himself than Kugayama. A hardcore cosplayer and costume designer, Tanaka is able to bring what should be impractical or even impossible costumes to life. Tanaka is also an expert and veteran plamo (plastic model) and Gunpla builder and is not afraid to teach anyone who is willing to learn. While well-versed in many areas of model and figure culture, Tanaka is personally not experienced with figure-modeling, but attempts to learn by sculpting a model of Shinobu from Kujibiki Unbalance. Tanaka finds his dream girl in Ohno, who becomes not only the ideal model for his costumes, but also his girlfriend. He also makes costumes for Saki and Ogiue, though this can be attributed to his love of costume design, and not any sort of romantic feelings towards either of them. His cosplay skills helps him get into a fashion design school. Tanaka believes that models and cosplay are two separate worlds, and treats those two worlds somewhat differently. "Figures are figures. Cosplay is cosplay."

- Mitsunori Kugayama (久我山 光紀, Kugayama Mitsunori)

Voiced by: Kenji Nomura (Season 1 and 2), Hiroki Yasumoto (Second Generation) (Japanese); Jim J. Ward (English, as Rome Elliot); Alexandre Coadour (French); Tilo Schmitz (German)
The stuttering, heavyset Kugayama is Genshiken's only artist until Ogiue's arrival. He generally lacks the motivation and commitment to create a full-fledged dōjinshi. In volume 5, Sasahara asks Kugayama to draw a dōjinshi for Comic-Fest, which he fails to do until Saki forces him, Ogiue, and Sasahara to make one under a very tight schedule. He is given the nickname 'Kugapii' by Saki. In volume 6, he graduates and begins work at a medical device manufacturing company in Iidabashi as a salesman. Kugayama, though at first a seemingly mediocre artist, is actually quite talented. However, his talent only appears when he is properly motivated, i.e. when drawing more erotic imagery, particularly that of Yamada from Kujibiki Unbalance.

- Kanako Ohno (大野 加奈子, Ōno Kanako)

Voiced by: Ayako Kawasumi (Season 1 and 2), Yukana Nogami (Second Generation) (Japanese); Rachael Lillis (English); Jessica Barrier (French); Susanne Kaps (German)
Ohno is the fourth president of Genshiken. Raised in the United States since the third grade, she graduated from an American high school, joining the Genshiken at the beginning of the Fall term. Normally soft-spoken and easily embarrassed, Ohno is surprisingly upfront when it comes to one of her two main passions: cosplay. With a nice figure and large bosom, Ohno and her cosplaying (using costumes sewn personally by Tanaka, whom she begins dating) quickly become Genshiken's main attraction at student fairs. Ohno's other main passion is yaoi involving muscular, middle-aged, exceedingly bald men. One of the reasons Ohno joins Genshiken in the first place is because only they would accept her fetish. She is also close to Saki, as Saki was the first one to find out about Ohno's preference for older men. Because of her tastes and her Fujoshi preferences, she is also unusually attracted to Bara, a genre aimed towards gay men.
Ohno is against cosplay sex, claiming that doing so betray the characters, but when asked if it's okay to have sex while cosplaying as a porn character, she becomes very embarrassed and indicates she has already used that loophole. Her decision to become the next president of Genshiken comes from Saki's suggestion that she could turn it into a cosplay club (literally "Society for the Study of Cosplay" or Cosken in the original Japanese). Ohno later passes the presidency on to Ogiue. In the relaunch of the manga, it is revealed that she is not job hunting as she is waiting for Tanaka to finish his additional schooling, implying that she may be planning to be a housewife or to help him.

- Chika Ogiue (荻上 千佳, Ogiue Chika)

Voiced by: Kaori Mizuhashi (Season 1 and 2), Nozomi Yamamoto (Second Generation) (Japanese); Michele Knotz (English)
The fifth president of Genshiken and former member of the Manga Society, Ogiue is a girl who seemingly hates otaku, particularly female ones, but is arguably more perverse a yaoi fan than Ohno. Ogiue's tastes in yaoi stem from a preference for shōnen series, and like Kugayama she is an amateur artist. Despite her harsh attitude, Ogiue is actually easily coerced into doing things to which she initially objects. Ogiue has a tendency to fantasize about and then draw highly sexual homosexual encounters between the men she knows in real life, particularly Sasahara and Madarame. Ogiue has terrible eyesight, normally wears contacts, and speaks a Tohoku dialect when not speaking Japanese formally. Her most distinctive feature is her paintbrush-like hairstyle, and her last resort when losing an argument is to try and jump out of a nearby window, no matter what floor of the building she is on. In junior high, at the request of her friend Nakajima, Ogiue drew a yaoi dōjinshi of a boy named Makita, whom she had been secretly dating. Makita found the dōjinshi and soon after transferred to a different school. This incident is the source of Ogiue's trauma and self-hatred, and it continues to haunt her until she begins to date Sasahara, who is much more understanding of her yaoi fantasies and love of drawing. Ogiue eventually obtains a publishing deal with Monthly Afternoon, the very magazine in which Genshiken was published. In the relaunch of the manga, Ogiue managed to draw in three new members to Genshiken (not counting Sue) thanks to her large artwork demonstration. She has hired the four first-year club members to be her assistants for her professional manga work. One of her most signature features is her tall top-knot, which she wears through most of the series. In the relaunch, she wears her hair down more often, but usually puts it up when she is working.

- Manabu Kuchiki (朽木 学, Kuchiki Manabu)

Voiced by: Akira Ishida (Season 1 and 2), Jun Fukuyama (Second Generation) (Japanese); Ted Lewis (English, as Ed Paul); Mathieu Doang (French); Seong Un Sa (Korean)
Introduced in volume two of the manga, Kuchiki becomes a full-member of Genshiken together with Ogiue in volume four apparently after being kicked out of the Anime Club. Kuchiki is a very abrasive individual, with a loud and obnoxious style of speech and hyperactive mannerisms that often offend others. He has no qualms about doing indecent or improper things that get him in trouble, such as spying on Ogiue when she first joined, and is frequently beaten throughout the series following failed sexual assaults against both women and men in the club. He wants to be nicknamed Kuchi (クッチー, Kutchī) and enjoys it when people use this nickname. Kuchiki knows that his personality is off-putting but most often his intentions are good, such as when he caught a thief during the school fair and annoyed him into returning the stolen goods. He is actually the second-best fighting game player in Genshiken, next to Kousaka. He twice expects himself to be named the next Genshiken president, only to be passed over by Ohno and then Ogiue. Mostly a background comedic character, Kuchiki is used as a goad for a good many of Genshiken's slapstick and off-color jokes. One might even consider him a boke to the rest of the Genshiken's tsukkomi. In the relaunch of the manga, it is revealed that Kuchiki doesn't need to look for a job since he's pretty much guaranteed to have a job at a local bank thanks to family connections.

== Second Generation main characters ==
These characters were introduced in the Genshiken Nidaime manga, which is the continuation of Genshiken.

- Rika Yoshitake (吉武 莉華, Yoshitake Rika)

Voiced by: Sumire Uesaka (Japanese)
Yoshitake is a first year female student who decided to join Genshiken after seeing Ogiue's poster drawing demonstration and sensing the fujoshi aspects of it and recognizing Ogiue as a fujoshi. She is slender, wears glasses, is bright and cheerful, but often contrives amusing situations at other's expense, such as when she got Ohnno drunk and convinced her to shoot an erotic cosplay CD. Yoshitake became one of Ogiue's paid assistants when Ogiue needed help getting her professional manga ready by the deadline, and later wrote a manuscript which Yajima turned into a comic for the school fair.

- Mirei Yajima (矢島 美怜, Yajima Mirei)

Voiced by: Yumi Uchiyama (Japanese)
Yajima is a first year female student who also decided to join Genshiken after seeing Ogiue's manga poster drawing demonstration. She too is a fujoshi, though not as blatant about it as Yoshitake. She is of stocky build and tends to wear men's clothing. She has a very hard time accepting Hato's cross-dressing at first and insists that he would have an easier time if he stopped, but later becomes more sympathetic and often comes to his aid against the more aggressive Kuchiki and Yoshitake. Ironically, her attempts to protect Hato's privacy often result in her seeing more than she intended. Yajima draws but claims to be bad at it, though she works as an assistant under Ogiue and later as Yoshitake's artist during the school festival. In the manga, after Ogiue becomes a senior, she passes on the torch of president to Yajima, making Yajima the sixth president of the Genshiken club.

- Kenjiro Hato (波戸 賢二郎, Hato Kenjirō)

Voiced by: Kazutomi Yamamoto (Japanese, normal voice), Ai Kakuma (Japanese, cross-dressing voice)
Hato is a first year male student and the last to join during Ogiue's first membership drive. Hato shares the fujoshi love of yaoi and boy's love manga and doujinshi, making him a "fudanshi." Because of this, Hato decided to adopt a female persona, complete with a near perfect female voice, and only attends Genshiken meetings as a girl, though he attends classes as a guy. Even after the members of Genshiken learn his secret, Hato continues to cross-dress for the meetings, leading Genshiken to draft former member Madarame into letting Hato change at his apartment. As a girl, Hato looks and sounds the part so well, guys on campus begin trying to learn more about this "mysterious beauty" who only shows up after classes are over for the day. Indeed, Yajima had a hard time believing someone that looked so beautiful as a girl could really be a guy, but she saw the evidence first hand when Yoshitake and Hato came to her apartment and the trio got drunk. Hato doesn't believe that people see him as very beautiful when he dresses as a girl. Like Sue, Yoshitake, and Yajima, Hato is also one of Ogiue's paid assistants for her professional manga. Being gifted at drawing, Hato helps with the background imagery.

== Other characters ==
=== Other club members ===
- Original Club President/"Prez" (初代会長, Shodai Kaichō)

Voiced by: Yuji Ueda (Japanese); Jonathan Todd Ross (English, as Todd Garbeil); Alexandre Coadour (French)
This character is the first club president, whose name is never revealed. He is eerily quiet and very stealthy, moving from place to place like smoke without anyone noticing (scaring Saki in particular), although he seems largely harmless on the surface. He appears to have a vast amount of knowledge about the college and many of the students, although he denies having hidden cameras or any other means of spying on them. He has been head of the Genshiken longer than most care to remember; some indications go back as far as 1987. He often stands on top of buildings, staring into the club room. He leaves his position as President to work on his graduate thesis, implying that he is working on his PhD. He begins the custom of the current president personally choosing his or her successor. The titles for the first 12 episodes of the anime can be interpreted as the "research" he has conducted on unsuspecting fellow club-members, as titles from after his departure are far more mundane.

- Haraguchi (原口)

Voiced by: Koji Ishii (Japanese); J. David Brimmer (English, as Michael Alston Bailey); Gerard Surugue (French)
A "phantom member" of the Genshiken, Haraguchi rarely shows up at the club room, and when he does, it is almost always bad news. He is a member of the Manga Society and Anime Society as well, but has paid his club dues for none of them. Called "Haraguro" by those who are unfortunate enough to know him, he is roundly disliked by everyone in all three groups, and only grudgingly tolerated by his much-touted connections among semi-professional manga artists. However, as he tends to intimidate others into submission, few are willing to voice their complaints in public.

=== Ohno's American friends ===
- Susanna Hopkins (スザンナ・ホプキンス, Suzanna Hopukinsu)

Voiced by: Yuko Goto (Season 2), Naomi Ozora (Second Generation) (Japanese)
One of Ohno's American friends, Susanna (more frequently known as Susie or Sue), is a petite girl with an avid interest in yaoi. Susanna comes off as somewhat harsh and unsociable, and startles the other Genshiken members by using crude anime and manga quotes in Japanese (written in katakana to show her unfamiliarity with the language). As she makes gains in comprehension, her responding solely in quotes makes it unclear just how much Japanese she understands, much to the chagrin of Ogiue and others. Her extensive knowledge of anime and manga quotes suggests that Susanna is well-versed in both, having seen Neon Genesis Evangelion, Kimi ga Nozomu Eien, Fist of the North Star, Saint Seiya, Neko-Yasha, Mahoromatic, Azumanga Daioh, Doraemon and Lupin III, among others. She also seems to be obsessed with Japanese culture. As for her age, it is undetermined, and those who would know (i.e. Ohno) refuse to tell. Susanna wishes to study in Japan in the near future. In the relaunch of the manga and the subsequent Genshiken Nidaime anime series sequel, Sue has managed to be transferred to Shiiou University and is a first-year student and new club member of Genshiken. She is very close to Ogiue and still spouts various anime and manga quotes. Sue is even employed by Ogiue to be one of her assistants for the official manga Ogiue is writing and drawing. She starts to develop a crush on Madarame after kissing him at one of the school festivals, and in the manga it's shown that she becomes part of Madarame's harem and becomes the ultimate winner as she and Madarame pursue a relationship together.

- Angela Burton (アンジェラ・バートン, Anjera Bāton)

Voiced by: Yuki Kaida (Season 2), Misa Kobayashi (Second Generation) (Japanese); Rebecca Soler (English)
Another of Ohno's American friends, Angela is very much the opposite of Sue in that she is tall, mature, and very friendly. Angela is a very athletic girl and is able to endure posing for cosplay pictures longer than even an experienced cosplayer like Ohno. She is very fond of the anime and manga series General Gyororo. Angela enjoys both "male-oriented" and "female-oriented" doujinshi. She also has a bit of a glasses fetish (which makes her feel somewhat attracted to a scared Madarame the first time they meet). Angela does not seem to be able to speak much of any Japanese, with her vocabulary limited to terms like sō-uke ("total bottom," obviously learned through her interest in yaoi dōjinshi). However in the anime when characters are speaking Japanese around her she has commented on what they are saying in English, implying that she has a basic understanding of Japanese even if she does not speak it.
On one of her visits to Japan she meets Madarame in the Genshiken clubroom and asks him for an August issue of the anime magazine she was reading. He finds it for and she motions for him to sit next to her and read it with him. After a while of reading and turning the pages, Madarame turns a page, but quickly turns it back because Angela made it seem like she wasn't finished reading. Angela then tells him what a sensible man he is and how she was testing him much to Madarame's confusion. Here she takes notice of his hands and tells him he has beautiful fingers. This scene only appears in the anime and not in the manga.
In the new Genshiken Nidaime anime sequel series Angela returns to Japan every Comifest to cosplay with Ohno. She tells her that she knows about Madarame's infatuation with Saki and that he deserves to be happy, even going to the extent of proposing him a one night stand of casual sex, to which he utterly and embarrassingly objects. In the manga she becomes part of Madarame's harem, but due to the potential of a long distance relationship, she is considered to be the least likely candidate for Madarame to go after.

=== Other students at Shiiou University ===
- Takayanagi (高柳)

Voiced by: Eiji Yanagisawa (Japanese); William Hirsh (Season 1), Tom Wayland (Season 2) (English)
A member of the Manga Society, Takayanagi is on friendly terms with the Genshiken members and is seen conversing with them from time to time on various matters. In one notable instance, he finds himself in the unenviable position in the middle of the battle between the girls of his club and Ogiue, who had attempted to join. He is much relieved when the Genshiken takes Ogiue in, as the other girls in Genshiken are already hated by the Manga Society girls for various reasons.

- Yabusaki (薮崎)

Voiced by: Reiko Takagi (Season 2), Madoka Yonezawa (Second Generation) (Japanese); Melissa Schoenberg (English, as Melissa Hope)
One of the girls in the Manga Society at the time Ogiue attempted to join, she seems to harbor strong feelings of resentment towards Ogiue. Criticizing Ogiue for slipping into her Tohoku dialect when she doesn't speak formally, Yabusaki herself speaks in a highly pronounced Kansai dialect, which she says scares those from Kantō. When Ogiue is rejected as a vendor for the next ComiFes, Yabusaki (grudgingly) invites her to become a guest artist in her own circle's dōjinshi. Later in the show, she appears to be on friendlier terms with Ogiue and helps her work on her professional manga. Though she appears only towards the end of the manga, she shows up much earlier in the anime, in episode 3 of season 2. In the anime adaptation of the Second Season, her first name is Kumiko.

- Naoko Asada (麻田 直子, Asada Naoko)

Voiced by: Momoko Saito (Season 2), Konomi Tada (Second Generation) (Japanese)
Yabusaki's friend and fellow member of the Manga Society who speaks in a highly irregular manner. Her real name is never revealed in the original manga series, but she received the name "Asada" for the second Genshiken TV series in the ending credits. In chapter 63 of the relaunch of Genshiken, she is addressed as "Naoko" by Yabusaki.

- Kato (加藤, Katō)

Voiced by: Eri Nakao (Japanese)
Kato is a mysterious girl in the manga society, who always wears her hair over her face. At some point, she takes an interest in becoming friends with Ogiue, and sets out to do just that in spite of her fellow members' dislike of the girl. In reality, she is quite good looking, but few seem to know this because of the way she conceals her features.

=== Figures from Ogiue's past ===
- Nakajima (中島)

Voiced by: Aya Endo (Season 2), Mari Hino (Second Generation) (Japanese)
One of Ogiue's friends from her junior high school days, Nakajima worked on writing scripts for yaoi dōjinshi which Ogiue would then draw. When she notices the relationship between Ogiue and Makita, she appears to grow jealous of the two, orchestrating the event that Ogiue carries as a mark of shame from that point on. Her appearance (along with Shigeta) at Comifes while Ogiue is selling her newest dōjinshi greatly disturbs Ogiue emotionally, until her bitter reminiscence is interrupted by the arrival of Susie.

- Mina Shigeta (重田, Shigeta Mina)

Voiced by: Yuka Iguchi (Japanese)
Another of Ogiue's friends from junior high school, Shigeta (distinguished by her blushing cheeks) was one of the group with whom Ogiue made dōjinshi. While perhaps not directly responsible for the incident involving Ogiue and Makita, she still associates with Nakajima even five years later, and her presence is enough to upset Ogiue at Comifes when she appears. Her name is not mentioned in the manga, or in dialogue; it appears in the credits in episode 11 of Genshiken 2.

=== Figures from other members' pasts ===
- Konno Kon (今野, Kon Konno)

Voiced by: Yuri Yamaoka (Japanese)
A tense and constantly wide-eyed female otaku and Fujoshi character from the second season of the Genshiken manga and the Genshiken Nidaime anime. Konno was a friend of Hato Kenjirou during high school and was involved in the event that made Hato turn into crossdressing when he confessed to her that he was a Fudanshi (male fan of yaoi). It is later revealed that unbeknownst to Hato, Konno has been harboring feelings for him since their days at high school.

- Michiru Kaminaga (神永, Kaminaga Michiru)

Voiced by: Mamiko Noto (Japanese)
A very beautiful, talented and strong-willed Fujoshi, Kaminaga is a former senior classmate from Hato Kenjirou's high school days. Kaminaga was admired by Hato for her artistic ability and her Fujoshi lifestyle. Hato takes her image as the basis of his own crossdressing so he is easily confused for her, as Hato wears a wig extremely similar to Kaminaga's hair. Kaminaga began an affair with the older Judo practicing brother of Hato and will marry him soon according to the manga and its anime adaptation.

- Mimasaka (美作, Mimasaka)

Voiced by: Kana Akutsu (Japanese)
An old high school friend of Mirei Yajima. A quite timid young girl with glasses, she greatly admires Yajima and will cling to her when troubled. To the surprise of many, Mimasaka is a big fan of Yajima’s drawings, not in spite of their lack of quality but because of it, claiming that it shows Yajima’s persistent personality. Mimasaka also does not view crossdressing Genshiken club member Hato Kenjirou fondly, as she senses something funny about his relationship with Yajima.

=== Genshiken members' relatives ===
- Keiko Sasahara (笹原 恵子, Sasahara Keiko)

Voiced by: Kaori Shimizu (Season 1 and 2), Ikumi Hayama (Second Generation) (Japanese); Jessica Calvello (English, as Zena Fries); Fanny Bloc (French)
Keiko is Kanji Sasahara's little sister, who leads a kogal lifestyle. She carries a blatant crush on Kousaka, much to Saki's chagrin. She even tries to become an otaku and gets drawn into the otaku world (to a point) when she seems to like some of the dōjinshi Ohno shares with her. In volume 6, she moves into Kanji's place so that she can take the entry exam for Shiiou University and fails, but she gets into Ohka Business College nearby. Her sole reason for doing so is in order to join Genshiken and be closer to Kousaka.
In the manga relaunch and the anime series sequel Keiko visits the club's room often and gets involved in Madarame's obsession with Saki. Keiko tells every former male member of the Genshiken that she meets that she now works as a hostess in a cabaret club and offers them her business card. She is a huge flirt, constantly teasing the other guys, especially Madarame. In the manga, when Madarame starts to become more popular, she decides to try her best to win him over when she learns she's part of his harem despite the fact he's not her type. This is because she really doesn't want to lose to the others.

- Risa Yoshitake (吉武 莉紗, Yoshitake Risa)

Voiced by: Shou Saotome (Japanese)
Risa is Rika Yoshitake's tall and athletic sibling from the second season of Genshiken. Despite her height she is actually two years younger than Rika and is also shy. Risa practices basketball and is very tall, so she is often mistaken for a man. As a Fujoshi, she is a fan of the Shota genre.
