= List of Genshiken chapters =

First English volume cover of Genshiken, as released by Del Rey Manga on April 26, 2005

The chapters of the Japanese manga series Genshiken are written and illustrated by Shimoku Kio. It was serialized in Kodansha's seinen manga magazine Monthly Afternoon from April 25, 2002, (Note: Debuted in the magazine's June 2002 issue.) to May 25, 2006, (Note: Finished in the magazine's July 2006 issue.) and published in nine tankōbon volumes between December 2002 and December 2006. The English version, translated by David Ury, was released by Del Rey Manga between April 2005 and November 2007, and republished in three omnibus volumes by Kodansha USA between May 2012 and January 2013.

A sequel series, titled Genshiken: Second Season (げんしけん二代目, Genshiken Nidaime), was serialized in Monthly Afternoon from October 25, 2010, to August 25, 2016, and reprinted in twelve tankōbon volumes released between May 2011 and November 2016. The English version was released by Kodansha USA between September 2012 and March 2018.

Genshiken follows the everyday lives of a college club for otaku, Shiiou University's "Society for the Study of Modern Visual Culture" (現代視覚文化研究会, Gendai Shikaku Bunka Kenkyūkai), or just "Genshiken" for short. The story begins in Spring 2002 with the character Kanji Sasahara's discovery of the club as a freshman, and progresses until his graduation in March 2006. This timeframe is roughly contemporaneous with the comic's original serialization. Story dates are established periodically by background evidence in the manga, such as calendars, as well as through cyclical events such as school fairs, graduations, and the Summer and Winter "Comic Festival" (Comifes), which precisely mirrors the real-life Comic Market. These dates provide a contextual basis not only for the characters' progression through college, but also the particular era which the characters inhabit, whose iteration of otaku culture the Genshiken manga is a commentary upon. In much the same way, the anime adaptation is considerably more vague about when the series takes place, allowing it to reference more recent developments in the subculture that had not yet taken place at the time of the manga's original publication.

The collected tankōbon volumes generally have six chapters each. Additionally, each volume contains between-chapter interludes with regards to an otaku-specific topic. This can range from the characters discussing the best moments in the Kujibiki Unbalance anime (a show within a show for the series) in volume four, Tanaka's construction of a figure from scratch in volume six, or reviewing character designs for the newer Kujibiki Unbalance adaptation in volume eight. Although these side-bits do not often pertain directly to the plot of the volume, they provide additional commentary on particular elements of fandom as well as the characters themselves, while further establishing a sense of reality for the world the characters inhabit.

== Volume list ==
=== Genshiken volumes ===
No.	Original release date	Original ISBN	English release date	English ISBN
1	December 20, 2002	978-4-06-321144-3	April 26, 2005 (Del Rey); May 22, 2012 (omnibus)	978-0-345-48169-6 (Del Rey); 978-1-93542-936-4 (omnibus)
1. "Genshiken" (現視研); 2. "Prepare to be Persecuted" (虐ゲラレル覚悟, Shiitagerareru Kakugo); 3. "The Most Meaningless Strategy in History" (史上最小・最軽量の作戦, Shijō Saishō, Saikeiryō no Sakusen); 4. "Gather 'Round the Round Table" (円卓会議は踊る, Entaku Kaigi wa Odoru); 5. "Fighting the Crowd" (コミコミ, Komikomi); 6. "The Secret Room" (秘密の小部屋, Himitsu no Kobeya); "To Hell with Destiny" (運命なんてしらない, Unmei nante Shiranai); Story Date: 1. Spring 2002 (Note: Unclear within the chapter itself, but cemented by the date of chapter 5.); 2. Spring 2002; 3. Uncertain; 4. Uncertain; 5. 11 August 2002 (Note: The third day of Comifes 62.); 6. Late August–Early September 2002; Bonus: Spring 2002 (Note: Some time prior to the first chapter of the manga.)
2	June 23, 2003	978-4-06-321151-1	July 26, 2005 (Del Rey); May 22, 2012 (omnibus)	978-0-345-48170-2 (Del Rey); 978-1-93542-936-4 (omnibus)
7. "A Fruit Plucked Too Soon" (青き果実を血湖に染めて, Aoki Kajitsu o Kekko ni Somete); 8. "The North Wind"; 9. "Hi, Flying High" (ハイ、フライ ハイ, Hai, Furai Hai); 10. "Sadomasochism" (サドマゾ, Sadomazo); 11. "Sasahara Gains Some Hit Points, But Loses Intelligence Points" (ササハラはレベルがあがった! かしこさが2へった!, Sasahara wa Reberu ga Agatta! Kashikosa ga Ni Hetta!); 12. "Please, Mr. President!" (会長お願いします!, Kaichō Onegai Shimasu!); "Kujibiki Boom" (くじびきでポン, Kujibiki de Pon); Story date: 7. October 2002; 8. November 2002 (Note: While the club is to be eliminated "by the end of December," the planning board in the background on page 44 shows the days of the month falling on the same weekdays as November 2002.); 9. 29/30 December 2002 (Note: Comiket 63 was held from 28–30 December 2002. Since Ohno went to Comifes the day before with Tanaka, it cannot be the first day, but it is unclear whether it is the second or third day.); 10. January/February 2003 (Note: Madarame's hand is still in a cast, so the "two months" of required healing time have not yet fully elapsed since the end of december.); 11. March 2003 (Note: Madarame's hand is no longer in its cast.); 12. Spring 2003; Bonus: N/A
3	December 22, 2003	978-4-06-321155-9	October 25, 2005 (Del Rey); May 22, 2012 (omnibus)	978-0-345-48171-9 (Del Rey); 978-1-93542-936-4 (omnibus)
13. "The Smell of Spring" (spring スメル, spring Sumeru); 14. "Inner Space" (インナースペース, Innāsupēsu); 15. "20,000 Miles to Heaven" (天国までの二万マイル, Tengoku made no Niman Mairu); 16. "Brothers and Sisters"; 17. "Life or Death" (死線, Shisen); 18. "The 512th 'This Week's Kujibiki Unbalance was Awesome' Meeting. Fire Away!" (第512回今週の『くじアン』面白かった会議ファイヤー!!, Dai Gohyakujūni-kai Konshū no 'Kujian' Omoshirokatta Kaigi Faiyā!!); "The 8th (How was This Week's 'Kuji-Un'?) Meeting" (第8回「今週のアニメ『くじアン』どうよ?」会議, Dai Hakkai Konshū no Anime Kujian Dō yo? Kaigi) (Note: This two-page comic was originally featured in "Mini Afternoon", a sample booklet distributed to bookstores as part of Kodansha's "Afternoon KC Festival 2003" promotion.); Story date: 13. Spring 2003; 14. Uncertain; 15. Early Summer 2003; 16. Mid-August 2003 (Note: 15–17 August, though it isn't entirely clear which day they go.); 17. Late August / Early September 2003; 18. September 2003; Bonus: Uncertain
4	June 23, 2004	978-4-06-321162-7	January 31, 2006 (Del Rey); September 18, 2012 (omnibus)	978-0-345-48242-6 (Del Rey); 978-1-93542-937-1 (omnibus)
19. "Punishment" (おしおきだべェ〜〜, Oshioki da bē~~); 20. "Members in Exile" (漂流部室, Hyōryū Bushitsu); 21. "Happy New Year" (よいお年を, Yoi O-toshi o); 22. "The Re-birth of Genshiken" (げんしけん誕生, Genshiken Tanjō); 23. "Space Channel #2"; Story date: 29. Fall 2003; 20. Late Fall 2003; 21. Late 2003–30 December 2003 (Note: The end of the chapter, at least, takes place on the third day of Comifes 65, the last Tuesday of December 2003.); 22. Early–Late January 2004 (Note: The chapter goes until Sasahara submits his application for Comifes 66 (which has to be prior to the deadline in mid-February). The narration states that the Comifes arc will resume five months later, which happens to be the end of June.); 23. February/March 2004; 24. Spring 2004 (Note: It is a new academic year, and hence recruiting time for student organizations.); Bonus: Uncertain (Note: Some time after Takayanagi's comment in chapter 24 that the Manga Society girls already hate the Genshiken girls.)
5	November 22, 2004	978-4-06-321164-1	April 25, 2006 (Del Rey); September 18, 2012 (omnibus)	978-0-345-49153-4 (Del Rey); 978-1-93542-937-1 (omnibus)
25. "Dive * Dive * Dive!"; 26. "Applied Theory of Madarame's Shopping Method" (斑目式買い物法応用編, Madarame-shiki Kaimono-hō Ōyō-hen); 27. "Stay on Target" (志(ココロザシ)・ミノタケ, Kokorozashi Minotake); 28. "The First Ever 'We've Hardly Got Any Pages Done Yet-Comic-Fest Strategy Meeting'" (第1回緊急コミフェス対策 原稿ほとんどできてねぇ会議, Dai-Ikkai Kinkyū Komifesu Taisaku Genkō Hotondo Dekitenē Kaigi); 29. "Little Big Sight 1"; 30. "Little Big Sight 2"; "Irohagokko" (いろはごっこ); Story date: 25. Spring 2004 (Note: Not long after Ogiue joins, in the previous chapter.); 26. Spring 2004; 27. Late June 2004; 28. 24 July–15 August 2004 (Note: The dates are referenced at the beginning and end of the chapter; the date of the event itself matches the real-life dates of Comiket 66.); 29. 15 August 2004 (morning) (Note: Direct continuation of the previous chapter.); 30. 15 August 2004 (afternoon/evening); Special: 15 August 2004 (evening) (Note: Saki is reading the dōjinshi at the after-party, and is "totally offended".)
6	June 23, 2005; June 21, 2005 (SE)	978-4-06-321170-2; 978-4-06-364639-9 (SE)	July 25, 2006 (Del Rey); September 18, 2012 (omnibus)	978-0-345-49154-1 (Del Rey); 978-1-93542-937-1 (omnibus)
31. "Kashimashi Musume +1" (かしまし娘+1); 32. "In Their Own World" (フタリノセカイ, Futari no Sekai); 33. "Transformation!" (変・身!!!!, Hen shin!!!!); 34. "A One-Way Ticket on the Fantasy Express" (妄想特急大暴走 〜レールはいつも平行線〜, Mōsō Tokkyū Dai-Bōsō: Rēru wa Itsumo Heikōsen); 35. "The Flying Futon" (ふとんがふっとん......, Futon ga Futton......); 36. "Graduation Syndrome" (卒業症候群, Sotsugyō Shōkōgun); Bonus: "A Graduation Party of Love and Desire" (愛と欲望の追い出しコンパ, Ai to Yokubō no Oidashi Konpa); Story date: 31. Uncertain; 32. Uncertain; 33. 29 December 2004 (Note: The first day of Comiket 67, held on the last Wednesday and Thursday in December 2004.); 34. January / Early February 2005 (Note: Has to be prior to mid-February, because Ogiue is applying to the Summer Comifes.); 35. Mid-February 2005 (Note: Keiko is taking Shiiou's entrance exams, and Chuo University's entrance exams take place in mid-February.); 36. March 2005; Bonus: same day (evening)
7	December 22, 2005	978-4-06-321174-0	October 31, 2006 (Del Rey); January 29, 2013 (omnibus)	978-0-345-49155-8 (Del Rey); 978-1-61262-062-6 (omnibus)
37. "Endless Waltz"; 38. "The Cosplay Club" (こすけん, Kosuken); 39. "One, Two, Finish"; 40. "Come Here, My Dear"; 41. "There's No Such Thing As a Line That Never Ends" (やまない雨はなく、進まない行列もない, Yamanai Ame wa Naku, Susumanai Gyōretsu mo Nai); 42. "The Interview" (メンセツ, Mensetsu); 43. "Welcome Party" (ウェルカム・パーティー, Werukamu Pātī); "Super-Sexy Bonus Manga!– Summer Just Isn't Steamy Enough" (超特別サービス描き下ろしおまけマンガ 「夏は湯気が少なくて困るなあ」の巻, Chō Tokubetsu Sābisu Kakioroshi Omake Manga Natsu wa Yuge ga Sukunakute Komaru nā no Maki); Story date: 37. Spring 2005 (Note: The Spring student club fair of the year.); 38. Uncertain; 39. Uncertain; 40. Uncertain–August 2005 (Note: The chapter begins some time before Comifes, and ends with the arrival of Angela and Sue several days prior.); 41. 13 August 2005 (Note: The second day of Comifes 68; Ogiue remarks that they'll be back "tomorrow" with Angela and Sue, which is referenced as the third day of the convention in the next chapter.); 42. 14 August–Early September 2005 (Note: The chapter begins on the third day of Comifes 68, and ends some time in September (as per Keiko's comment).); 43. 9 September 2005 (Note: Established from the date of Ogiue's SMS two days later.); Bonus: 9 September (evening)
8 (Note: Volumes 8 and 9 of Genshiken contain a number of chapters not included in the original serialization; these were inserted into the numbering of the series and the numbers of subsequent chapters were adjusted to match.)	August 23, 2006	978-4-06-321179-5	March 27, 2007 (Del Rey); January 29, 2013 (omnibus)	978-0-345-49156-5 (Del Rey); 978-1-61262-062-6 (omnibus)
44. "Bedazzled" (目眩(めくるめ)く, Mekurumeku); "When They Were Getting Really Excited" (最初にずいぶん盛り上がってた頃, Saisho ni Zuibun Moriagatteta Koro); 45. "Dreaming" (夢酔い, Yumeyoi); 46. "The Bridge Home" (戻り橋, Modoribashi); 47. "Set Eyes On"; 48. "After-School Date Club" (放課後デート倶楽ブ, Hōkago Dēto Kurabu) (Note: Did not appear in the original serialization.); 49. "The Maid Café and the Three Visits" (メイド喫茶と三顧の礼, Meido Kissa to Sanko no Rei); Story date: 44. Spring 2000 / 9 September 2005 (Note: The flashback is "five years ago," in the Spring of Ogiue's third year of junior high school (i.e. 9th Grade in the US school system).); Bonus: 9 September 2005 (Note: Presumably just prior to Ogiue talking about her past with the other girls.); 45. 10 September 2005 (Note: The next day after chapter 44.); 46. 10–11 September 2005 (Note: Direct continuation of the previous chapter; the date of 11 September at the end is given in Ogiue's SMS.); 47. 12–19(?) September 2005 (Note: Begins the day after the end of the previous chapter; later, Madarame mentions he hasn't seen her since the trip, about a week ago.); 48. Uncertain; 49. October 2005 (Note: The fall student festival at Shiiou University.)
9	December 22, 2006; December 20, 2006 (SE)	978-4-06-321183-2; 978-4-06-364674-0 (SE)	November 27, 2007 (Del Rey); January 29, 2013 (omnibus)	978-0-345-50197-4 (Del Rey); 978-1-61262-062-6 (omnibus)
50. "Alone with Susie" (スージーといっしょ, Sūjī to Issho) (Note: Did not appear in the original serialization. However, the first six pages of this chapter were included in chapter 48 (chapter 53 in this volume); this accounts for the out-of-place "Next year..." narration box on page 8.); 51. "Neverending Earthly Desires" (ボンノーはとめどなく, Bonnō wa Tomedo Naku); 52. "Rain or Shine"; 53. "The Confession" (告白, Kokuhaku) (Note: Originally serialized as chapter 48, with the first six pages of chapter 50, "Alone with Susie".); 54. "Forever in My Dreams" (いつでも夢を, Itsu de mo Yume o) (Note: Originally serialized as chapter 49.); 55. "Genshiken" (げんしけん) (Note: Originally serialized as chapter 50.); "A Farewell Party of Love and Delusion" (恋と妄想の追い出しコンパ, Koi to Mōsō no Oidashi Konpa); Story date: 50. 29/30 December 2005 (Note: Comiket 69 took place over these two days in December 2005. It is not clear which day they attend.); 51. 31 December 2005–1 January 2006 (Note: The chapter takes place on New Year's Eve and they return the next morning.); 52. uncertain; 53. uncertain; 54. March 2006 (Note: A calendar with a Friday 31st is shown (p.129). March was the only month of 2006 to have such a date.); 55. March–April 2006; Bonus: March 2006

=== Genshiken: Second Season volumes ===
No.	Original release date	Original ISBN	English release date	English ISBN
10	May 23, 2011	978-4-06-310752-4	September 4, 2012 (print); July 16, 2013 (digital)	978-1-61262-237-8 (print); 978-1-61262-637-6 (digital)
56. "Spring Will Come Again" (春はまた来る, Haru wa Mata Kuru); 57. "Across the Street, the Promised Place" (道のむこう、約束の場所, Michi no Mukō, Yakusoku no Basho); 58. "Step Over My Legs" (俺の脚を超えてゆけ, Ore no Ashi o Koete Yuke); 59. "Minesweeper"; 60. "Teacher's Room"; 61. "Daydream Believer" (腐り姫の夢(デイドリームビリーバー), Dei Dorīmu Birībā); "You Don't Need to Be Pure of Heart to Come Inside" (心がピュアでなくてもご入店できます, Kokoro ga Pyua Denakutemo Go Nyūten Dekimasu); Story date: 56.; 57.; 58.; 59.; 60.; 61.; Bonus:
11	December 22, 2011; December 20, 2011 (LE)	978-4-06-310793-7; 978-4-06-358377-9 (LE)	March 19, 2013 (print); July 16, 2013 (digital)	978-1-61262-242-2 (print); 978-1-61262-638-3 (digital)
62. "Beards and Boobs" (HIGE to BOIN); 63. "Invasion! Booth Girl" (侵略! 看板娘, Shinryaku! Kanban Musume); 64. "Moénage à Trois" (ミツドモエェ, Mitsudomoē); 65. "Summer Goldfinger"; 66. "Karma Next!" (業(ゴー)NEXT!, Gō Nekusuto!); 67. "Crying Out Moe, Over the Horizon of Fate" (因果地平の彼方(かなた)でモエを叫ぶ, Inga Chihei no Kanata de Moe o Sakebu); "The First Sue Kinda Kicks Ass Meeting" (第1回スーさんがなんか強い件, Dai Ikkai Sū San ga Nanka Tsuyoi Ken); Story date: 62.; 63.; 64.; 65.; 66.; 67.; Bonus:
12	June 22, 2012	978-4-06-387826-4	September 17, 2013	978-1-61262-299-6 (print); 978-1-61262-639-0 (digital)
68. "Your Name Is" (君の名は, Kimi no Na wa); 69. "Smooth Talk" (つるかめ, Tsurukame); 70. "Hide & Seek" (ハイド&seek, Haido ando Shīku); 71. "It's a Route, But Not a Loop" (ルートはあってもループはない, Rūto wa Attemo Rūpu wa Nai); 72. "The True Ending Is Not in Sight" (トゥルーエンドは まだ見えない, Turū Endo wa Mada Mienai); 73. "The Romantic Three" (KOIBANA3); "An Apple a Day Keeps You Slick 'n' Smooth" (一日一善つるつる会議, Ichinichi Ichizen Tsurutsuru Kaigi); Story date: 68.; 69.; 70.; 71.; 72.; 73.; Bonus:
13	December 21, 2012	978-4-06-387856-1	March 18, 2014	978-1-61262-549-2 (print); 978-1-61262-688-8 (digital)
74. "Ogin Lagann" (一天突破オギンラガン, Itten Toppa Ogin Ragan); 75. "White Gate Keeper" (ホワイト ゲート キーパー, Howaito Gēto Kīpā); 76. "Snow Man"; 77. "Back in Beard" (バック・Ni・ベアード, Bakku Ni Beādo); 78. "The Porno We Saw That Day" (あの日見たAVの題名を僕達はもう忘れた, Ano Hi Mita Ē Bui no Daimei o Bokutachi wa Mō Wasureta); 79. "Last Escape"; "The Time I Couldn't Stop Shaking While Helping My Classmate Wear Women's Clothes" (同級生の女装を手伝 (中略) の震えが止まらない件, Dōkyūsei no Josō o Tetsuda (Chūryaku) no Furue ga Tomaranai Ken); Story date: 74.; 75.; 76.; 77.; 78.; 79.; Bonus:
14	June 21, 2013	978-4-06-387895-0	September 16, 2014	978-1-61262-576-8 (print); 978-1-61262-808-0 (digital)
80. "It Was a Good Finale (Confession II)" (いい最終回だった (告白II), Ii Saishūkai Datta (Kokuhaku Tsū)); 81. "The Tears of a (Broken-Hearted) Clown" (失恋ピエロの悶絶, Shitsuren Piero no Monzetsu); 82. "Crossfire" (クロスファイア, Kurosufaia); 83. "Life Instrumentality Project" (人生補完計画, Jinsei Hokan Keikaku); 84. "Red (Face) King"; 85. "Special Prank Report" (ドッキリthreeの㊙報告, Dokkiri Surī no Maruhi Hōkoku); "Festival Afterparty in Madarame's Room!" (学園祭打ち上げin斑目ルーム!, Gakuensai Uchiage in Madarame Rūmu!); Story date: 80.; 81.; 82.; 83.; 84.; 85.; Bonus:
15	December 20, 2013; December 18, 2013 (SE)	978-4-06-387945-2; 978-4-06-358462-2 (SE)	March 24, 2015	978-1-61262-987-2 (print); 978-1-63236-010-6 (digital)
86. "Daydream Match" (デイドリームマッチ, Deidorīmu Matchi); 87. "Something's Coming" (何か来るぅ, Nanika Kurū); 88. "Unconditional Buy!!" (無条件で買いーー!!, Mujōken de Kaiii!!); 89. "Festival Evol" (フェスティバル・EVOL, Fesutibaru Evoru); 90. "The Gods of Desire" (煩悩(ぼんのう)の神々, Bonnō no Kamigami); 91. "And Thus into Legend..." (そして伝説へ......, Soshite Densetsu e......); "Encounter at Comic-Fest" (遭遇戦inコミフェス, Sōgūsen in Komifesu); Story date: 86.; 87.; 88.; 89.; 90.; 91.; Bonus:
16	June 23, 2014	978-4-06-387977-3	October 6, 2015	978-1-63236-116-5 (print); 978-1-68233-005-0 (digital)
92. "The Huntress" (魔弾ノ射手, Madan no Shashu); 93. "The 128mm Cannon of My Crotch Is Still Just 37mm" (俺の股間の128mm砲(ヤークトティーガー)が37mm砲(ウサギさんチーム)のままです, Ore no Kokan no Yākutotīgā ga Usagi San Chīmu no Mama Desu); 94. "Snow Man 2"; 95. "Crusher Rame" (クラッシャーラメ, Kurasshā Rame); 96. "Like Fish to Water" (水心アリ, Mizugokoro Ari); 97. "Moving" (おひっこし, O Hikkoshi); "In Memory of Hachiro Nagata" (追悼 永田八郎, Tsuitō Nagata Hachirō); Story date: 92.; 93.; 94.; 95.; 96.; 97.; Bonus:
17	December 22, 2014	978-4-06-388021-2	April 26, 2016	978-1-63236-212-4 (print); 978-1-68233-216-0 (digital)
98. "The Near and Far Banks of the Harem Boundary" (ハーレムの境界線上の彼方(かなた)と此方(こなた), Hāremu no Kyōkai Senjō no Kanata to Konata); 99. "Little Sister's Exam II" (妹受験II, Imōto Juken Tsū); 100. "It's the Van Allen Belt's Birthday?" (バン・アレン帯のお誕生日ですか?, Ban Aren Tai no O Tanjōbi Desu ka?); "This Is the Best I Can Do For Now" (今ハ コレガ セーイッパイ, Ima wa Kore ga Sē Ippai); 101. "First Unit of the Madarame Model Light Cruiser, 'Madarame' Sortie!" (斑目(マダラメ)型けーじゅん1番艦「斑目」出撃!, Madarame Gata Kējun Ichi Ban Kan "Madarame" Shutsugeki!); 102. "Madarame Mk. II Enters the Cabaret-Skirmish" (斑目改 キャ号突撃戦, Madarame Kai Kya Gō Totsugekisen); 103. "The Sinking of the Madarame Mk. II" (斑目改二の轟沈(ごうちん), Madarame Kai Ni no Gōchin); "Arriving in Hachioji" (八王子に着きました, Hachiōji ni Tsukimashita); Story date: 98.; 99.; 100.; Bonus: 101.; 102.; 103.; Bonus:
18	June 23, 2015	978-4-06-388061-8	October 25, 2016	978-1-63236-316-9 (print); 978-1-68233-459-1 (digital)
104. "The First Time" (初めて君を, Hajimete Kimi o); 105. "Farewell, My Beloved V-Card" (さらば愛しきDT, Saraba Itoshiki Dī Tī); 106. "The Spring Warbler Has Yet to Warble" (春告げ鳥 未(いま)だ鳴かず, Harutsugedori Imada Nakazu); 107. "See the Tobu Line by Train..." (東武線の車窓から, Tōbu Sen no Shasō kara); 108. "Return of Yajima" (リターン オブ ヤジマ, Ritān obu Yajima); 109. "If Those Are Proof You Can Do Anything, Are These Proof I Can't Do Anything?" (それが何でも出来る証拠なら これは何も出来ない証拠なの?, Sore ga Nandemo Dekiru Shōko Nara Kore wa Nanimo Dekinai Shōko na no?); Bonus. "So We're Still Doing This, Huh" (このネタまだ引っ張るか, Kono Neta Mada Hipparu ka); Story date: 104.; 105.; 106.; 107.; 108.; 109.; Bonus:
19	December 22, 2015	978-4-06-388104-2	March 14, 2017	978-1-63236-341-1 (print); 978-1-68233-667-0 (digital)
110. "Lucky☆Stag" (らき☆すけ, Raki Suke); 111. "A Man's Character" (男の器, Otoko no Utsuwa); 112. "Kujubiki Unbalance 1" (くじびきアンバランス1, Kujibiki Anbaransu Ichi); 113. "Kujubiki Unbalance 2" (くじびきアンバランス2, Kujibiki Anbaransu Ni); 114. "Kujubiki Unbalance 3" (くじびきアンバランス3, Kujibiki Anbaransu San); 115. "Kujubiki Unbalance 4" (くじびきアンバランス4, Kujibiki Anbaransu Yon); "Subtitle Fraud" (サブタイ詐欺, Sabutai Sagi); Story date: 110.; 111.; 112.; 113.; 114.; 115.; Bonus:
20	June 23, 2016	978-4-06-388143-1	September 26, 2017	978-1-63236-482-1 (print); 978-1-68233-877-3 (digital)
116. "Kujibiki Unbalance 5" (くじびきアンバランス5, Kujibiki Anbaransu Go); 117. "Kuji-Un Was Already Over" (くじアンはもう終わってた, Kuji An wa Mō Owatteta); 118. "If Her False Flag Breaks" (彼女がフラグを自演乙, Kanojo ga Furagu o Jien Otsu); 119. "You All Suck..." (モマエラ全員メンドくさい, Momaera Zen'in Mendo Kusai); 120. "Soul Weaver" (魂紡(たまつむ)ぎ, Tamatsumugi); 121. "Resurrection 'K'" (復活のK, Fukkatsu no Kei); "99.9% Fanservice" (99.9%サービス, Kyū Jū Kyū Ten Kyū Pāsento Sābisu); Story date: 116.; 117.; 118.; 119.; 120.; 121.; Bonus:
21	November 22, 2016	978-4-06-388209-4	March 13, 2018	978-1-63236-551-4 (print); 978-1-64212-143-8 (digital)
122. "Wanderin' Man" (股旅, Matatabi); 123. "Witness the Man's Way of Life" (見よ 男の生き様を, Miyo Otoko no Ikizama o); 124. "A Certain Club's One-Way Street" (とあるサークルの一方通行(ワンサイデッド), To Aru Sākuru no Wansaideddo); 125. "High Slope Flower..."; 126. "La Campanella (Confession III)" (ラ・カンパネラ (告白III), Ra Kanpanera (Kokuhaku Surī)); 127. "Genshiken Second Season" (げんしけん二代目, Genshiken Nidaime); "The Banishment Party of Meat and Lust" (肉と欲望の追い出しコンパ, Niku to Yokubō no Oidashi Konpa); Story date: 122.; 123.; 124.; 125.; 126.; 127.; Bonus:
