= Kujibiki =

Kujibiki is a Japanese term that roughly means "lottery" that is used to refer to several products:

- Kujibiki Unbalance, introduced in the 2002 manga Genshiken, also mentioned in the anime series and 3 of the fictional 26 episodes were done.
- Kujibiki Unbalance (2006 series), a continuous 12 episode interpretation of the series
- Kujibiki Unbalance: Kaichō Onegai Smash Fight, a 2007 fighting game adapted from the anime's popularity.
