= Bill Timoney =

American actor

- Born: March 5, 1958 (age 68); River Edge, New Jersey, U.S.
- Occupations: Actor; director; script writer; producer
- Years active: 1978–present
- Spouse: Georgette Reilly (m. 2002)
- Mother: Mary Gardiner
- Family: Mike Timoney (brother)

Bill Timoney (born March 5, 1958) is an American actor, director, script writer and producer.

== Career ==
Perhaps the best known of Timoney's roles on television is the character of Alfred Vanderpool on All My Children. The musical team Boyz II Men drew inspiration from Timoney's Vanderpool, and Nathan Morris, one of its tenors, used the stage name "Alex Vanderpool" in the character's honor early in the team's career. Timoney portrayed Vanderpool - known as "the preppie nerd of Pine Valley" - from 1982 through 1987, returning to the role on a cameo basis from 1998 through 2005.

Timoney is also a well-known voice actor, specializing in "dubbing" voices for foreign language live action and animated programs. He has directed and script-adapted dubs of Japanese anime at Headline Studios.

Timoney's eclectic career ranges from working as a stand-up comedian at NYC's famed Improv, to writing the recurring column "Heard But Not Seen: Adventures in Voice Acting" for Videoscope Magazine.

=== Theatre work ===
In April 2010, Timoney made his off-Broadway theater debut at the Soho Playhouse as the understudy for the actor Dan Butler in the role of Joseph Flaherty in The Irish Curse, dramatized by Martin Casella. Timoney went on for Butler for several performances. He also went on for Scott Jaeck in the role of Father Kevin for a single performance. In August 2010, Timoney received excellent notices for his performance as Bob in the Stephen Padilla drama, Picking Palin, for the New York International Fringe Festival. Co-starring with Timoney in the play was his wife, actress Georgette Reilly Timoney. The couple have performed together in stage productions at Arkansas Rep, NJ Rep, Shadow Lawn Stage, and the Celtic Theatre Company of New Jersey. The Timoneys voiced the recurring characters of married couple Izzy & Cara on Season 12 of the long-running anime TV series Pokémon.

Timoney served as associate producer, cast member and fight coordinator for the independent feature film Last Chance, the directing debut of Emmy-winning actor Bryan Cranston (of Breaking Bad).

Timoney took a one-year sabbatical from his acting career in 2012 in order to accept an offer to work as the line producer for "Ebru Today," a live, daily morning TV news program. Affiliated with the Turkish Samanyolu media conglomerate, the program aired all over the world. As line producer, Timoney was responsible for constructing each day's script, assigning stories to reporters and editors, and fact-checking the final script. He also wrote commentary and editorials, including the irreverent weekly feature "Get to Know Your Vice-Presidents."

In early 2014, Timoney made his Broadway debut portraying nine roles (Senator Karl Mundt; a White House aide; a butler, a Secret Service agent, a Congressman and others) in a dramatic play written by Robert Schenkkan entitled All The Way starring Bryan Cranston as Lyndon B. Johnson. The play opened on March 6, 2014, at The Neil Simon Theatre in Manhattan. It received very favorable reviews. All The Way won two 2014 Tony Awards for Best Play (Robert Schenkkan) and Best Actor In A Play (Bryan Cranston).

In 2018, Timoney and Cranston returned to Broadway in the stage adaptation of the film Network. Cranston won his second Tony Award for his portrayal of TV news anchorman Howard "mad as hell" Beale. Timoney played the TV news program's director, and he also understudied Cranston in the Beale role.

Timoney appears in the 2019 feature film The Irishman. Director Martin Scorsese chose Timoney to play an unscripted role of the prosecutor at the title character's trial. Timoney and Robert De Niro improvised the entire sequence of the prosecutor questioning the defendant.

== Personal life ==
Timoney has been married to Georgette Reilly, since March 16, 2002. The New Jersey natives reside on the Jersey Shore with their menagerie of dogs and cats.

== Filmography ==
=== Film ===
Year	Title	Role	Notes	Ref.
1997	Addicted to Love	Restaurant Patron		
1999	Last Chance	Buddy		
1999	Soccer Dog: The Movie	Kimbell's owner		
2000	Mission to Mars	Computer (voice)		
2000	The Last Late Night	George Carteris		
2003	Dead Canaries	Star Chamber Agent		
2008	Sea of Dust	Professor Sorell		
2016	The Infiltrator	Binoculars Man	Uncredited	
2016	Wakefield	Homeless Man	Uncredited	
2018	Delenda	Cop		
2018	The Price for Silence	Dr. Shaw		
2019	The Irishman	Prosecutor - Frank's 2nd Trial		
2021	New York Ninja	Pale Man (voice)		

=== Television ===
Year	Title	Role	Notes	Ref.
1983–1987	All My Children	Alfred Vanderpool	Cameo appearances 1992–2005	
1996	The High Life	Frank Stettler	Episode: "Army Buddies"	
2000	Rocket's Red Glare	Astronaut Pete Baker	TV movie	
2003–2004	Malcolm in the Middle	Mr. Miller, Uninformed Guard	Appears in two episodes: S4.E16: "Academic Octathalon" as Mr. Miller; S6.E2: "Buseys Run Away" as Uninformed Guard	
2004	Law & Order: Criminal Intent	Henry Forman	Episode: "F.P.S."	
2008	Lipstick Jungle	Marco	Episode: "Pilot"	
2015	12 Monkeys	Senator Royce	Appears in five episodes: S1.E1: "Splinter"; S1.E6: "The Red Forest"; S1.E7: "The Keys"; S1.E8: "Yesterday"; S1.E11: "Shonin"	
2015	Blue Bloods	Supervisor	Episode: "The Poor Door"	
2016	Mr. Robot	Male Executive	Episode: "eps2.7_init_5.fve"	
2018	Orange is the New Black	Warden Gifford	Episode: "Look Out for Number One"	
2018	The Good Cop	Alley Manager	Episode: "Will the Good Cop Bowl 300?"	
2020	I, Elvis Riboldi	Leonidas Riboldi	52 episodes	
2020	Hunters	Congressman Marshall	Episode: "In the Belly of the Whale"	
2020	The Blacklist	Pastor Ritzen	Episode: "Newton Purcell (No. 144)"	
2022	Billions	Construction Person	Episode: "Cannonade"	
2022	FBI	Priest	Episode: "Grief"	

=== Anime Dubbing ===
Year	Title	Role	Notes	Ref.
1989	Urotsukidoji: Legend of the Overfiend	Tatsuo Nagumo, Yuichi Nikki	As Danny Bush	
1990–1991	Record of Lodoss War	Parn	As Billy Regan	
1991	Here is Greenwood	Kazuhiko Hasukawa	As Billy Regan, CPM dub	
1991	Madara	Chaos, Additional voices	OVA	
1996	Battle Arena Toshinden	Duke B. Rambert		
1996	Jewel BEM Hunter Lime	Mr. Candle		
1996	Voltage Fighters: Gowcaizer the Movie	Ryo Asahina	As Billy Regan	
1997–1998	Battle Athletes	Additional Voices		
1998	Trigun	Kuroneko, Bowl Cut Henchman		
1998–1999	Cowboy Bebop	Baseball Announcer		
1999	Digimon: Digital Monsters	Lord Bakemon	Episode: "The Dancing Digimon" (uncredited)	
1999	Legend of Himiko	Enki	OVA	
1999–2001	Gravitation	Mr. Sakano		
2001	Shingu: Secret of the Stellar Wars	Hajime Murata	As Billy Regan	
2004	Daphne in the Brilliant Blue	Theft Victim		
2004–2007	Genshiken	Madarame		
2006	Magical Witch Punie-chan	Peter Pilot, Limo Driver	Direct-to-video	
2009	Mai Mai Miracle	Fujiwara	As Billy Regan	
2009–2010	Queen's Blade	Setora		
	Ikki Tousen: Dragon Destiny	Ukin	OVA	

=== Animation ===
Year	Title	Role	Notes	Ref.
2016	Pup 2 No Good	Veterinarian		
2017	Robot Trains	Vito, Ygor	Appears in 3 episodes: "The Train World Is in Danger"; "Victor Is in Danger"; "Runaway Virus Train"	

=== Video games ===
Year	Title	Role	Notes	Ref.
2003	.hack//Infection	Additional voices		
2003	.hack//Mutation	Additional voices		
2003	.hack//Outbreak	Additional voices		
2004	.hack//Quarantine	Additional voices		

== Production credits ==
Year	Title	Credited for		Notes	Ref.
Year	Title	Voice Director	Script Adaptation	Notes	Ref.
1990	Record of Lodoss War	Yes	No	Uncredited	
2001	Gokudo	Yes	Yes		
2001	Jewel BEM Hunter Lime	Yes	Yes		
2004	Gravitation	Yes	Yes		
2004	Kujibiki Unbalance	Yes	Yes		
2004–2007	Genshiken	Yes	Yes		
2005	Madara	Yes	Yes		
2007	Comic Party	Yes	No		
