= List of Genshiken episodes =

Genshiken is an anime television series based on the manga series by Shimoku Kio. It was produced by Genco through animation studio Palm in 2004 as a 12-episode anime, and in 2006 and 2007 as a 3-episode OVA. The TV series was licensed for North American release by Media Blasters. A second anime television series was announced in April 2007, airing between October and December of that year.

In the March 2013 issue of Monthly Afternoon, it was announced that a new anime had been authorized for Genshiken: Second Season. The sequel was directed by Tsutomu Mizushima at Production I.G, with Michiko Yokote handling the series composition. It premiered in July 2013, and includes the opening song "Genshi, Joshi wa, Taiyo Datta" by Sumire Uesaka and the band Kabuki Rocks. At Anime Expo 2013, NIS America announced their acquisition of Genshiken: Second Season, licensed under the title Genshiken: Second Generation, for release in North America.

A Genshiken: Second Generation OAD (Original Animation DVD) was bundled with the limited edition of the 15th volume of the Genshiken manga, released in December 2013.

== Genshiken ==
No.	Title	Original release date (Note: Genshiken aired on Chiba TV on Sunday 24:00, effectively Monday at 12:00 a.m. JST.)
1	"Study of the Modern Visually Oriented Culture"; Transliteration: "Gendai ni okeru Shikaku o Chūshin to shita Bunka no Kenkyū" (Japanese: 現代における視覚を中心とした文化の研究)	October 11, 2004
An introduction episode explaining how Kohsaka, Kasukabe and Sasahara got involved with Genshiken; after some uncertainty, Sasahara decides to fully participate in the club.
2	"Comparative Classification of the Modern Youth through Consumption and Entertainment"; Transliteration: "Shōhi to Yūkyō ni yoru Gendai Seishōnen no Hikaku Bunrui" (Japanese: 消費と遊興による現代青少年の比較分類)	October 18, 2004
Genshiken takes Sasahara to Akihabara for dōjinshi shopping while Kohsaka and Kasukabe go to Harajuku for clothes; Kasukabe discovers Kohsaka's hentai collection and gets an introduction on the subject from the others.
3	"Problems and Merits of Local Culture Promotion"; Transliteration: "Chiiki Bunka Shinkō no Mondaiten to sono Kōseki" (Japanese: 地域文化振興の問題点とその功績)	October 25, 2004
Genshiken goes on a club trip to Comifes, a large comic convention; Madarame seriously injures his hand, but pretends to be fine in the name of fandom until the pain becomes too great to bear.
4	"The Sublimating Effects of the Dissimulation Brought on Through Makeup and Costume on Mental Obstacles"; Transliteration: "Funsō to Kasō no Ika ni yoru Shinri-teki Shōheki no Shōkasayō" (Japanese: 扮装と仮装の異化による心理的障壁の昇華作用)	November 1, 2004
Ohno is introduced as she joins Genshiken, while Genshiken takes part in a university club fair and Kasukabe's ex-boyfriend pays her a visit.
5	"Limits of Rejection and Receptiveness as Observed in Autonomous Behaviour"; Transliteration: "Jiritsu Kōdō ni Miru Haiseki to Juyō no Kyōkai" (Japanese: 自律行動に見る排斥と受容の境界)	November 8, 2004
Due to Genshiken's lack of "activities" as defined by the school, the club is threatened with closure; salvation comes from an unlikely source as Kasukabe intervenes personally.
6	"On Connecting with Others through Subculture"; Transliteration: "Sabukaruchā o Meguru Tasha to no Kankei-ron" (Japanese: サブカルチャーをめぐる他者との関係論)	November 15, 2004
Kasukabe tries to make herself more appealing to Kohsaka by taking an interest in his hobbies by trying to learn how to play Puyo Pop Fever. Sasahara's sister Keiko also makes an appearance and calls on her brother for help.
7	"Aspects of Behavioral Selection in Interpersonal Relationships"; Transliteration: "Taijin Kankei ni okeru Kōdō Sentaku no Tokuchō" (Japanese: 対人関係における行動選択の特徴)	November 22, 2004
Two freshmen take an interest in Genshiken and join them for a night out on the town. Kasukabe, however, has no intention of making them feel welcome.
8	"Comparative Study in Production Models and Processes"; Transliteration: "Ryōsan-gata Seizō Katei ni okeru Hikaku Kenkyū" (Japanese: 量産型製造過程における比較研究)	November 29, 2004
Ohno and Sasahara start a plamo project and get the whole club involved, while Kasukabe learns an important lesson.
9	"Concerning the Existence and Non-Existence of Explanatory Duties Under Specially Confined Circumstances"; Transliteration: "Tokushu Heisa Jōkyō-ka ni okeru Setsumei Gimu no Umu ni tsuite" (Japanese: 特殊閉鎖状況下における説明義務の有無について)	December 6, 2004
Madarame is stuck in the club room with Kasukabe and tries to strike up a conversation, running through different scenarios in his head which parody the visual novel format.
10	"The Fetishism of Leisure Time Expenditures Considered by their Economic Result"; Transliteration: "Keizai Kōka kara Kangaeru Yoka Shōhi no Fetishizumu" (Japanese: 経済効果から考える余暇消費のフェティシズム)	December 13, 2004
The club, along with Keiko, pays a visit to the beach, much to the dismay of some of the members; Keiko decides to compete for Kohsaka's feelings and tries to become an otaku.
11	"On the Presence of Malicious Intent in Urban Crimes"; Transliteration: "Toshi-gata Hanzai ni okeru Akui no Shozai-ron" (Japanese: 都市型犯罪における悪意の所在論)	December 20, 2004
Kasukabe decides the club room needs a cleanup, but an accident causes Genshiken to be banned from the university fair. As an apology, Kasukabe takes Ohno's place in the fair's cosplay contest.
12	"Countermeasures for Issues that Arise during the Reorganization of a Group"; Transliteration: "Soshiki no Saikōchiku-ji ni Hassei suru Kadai to Taisaku" (Japanese: 組織の再構築時に発生する課題と対策)	December 27, 2004
The club is depressed due to their punishment of community service. Sasahara becomes the new President and proposes that the society attend Comifes as a circle.
OVA–1	"Otaku Hater Ogiue Here"; Transliteration: "Otaku ga Kirai na Ogiue desu" (Japanese: オタクが嫌いな荻上です)	December 22, 2006
Two new members join the society: the abrasive Manabu Kuchiki and the standoffish Chika Ogiue. Ohno hatches a plan to trick Ogiue into revealing her true inner self.
OVA–2	"I am from Planet Otaku"; Transliteration: "Watashi wa Otaku-seijin" (Japanese: 私はオタク星人)	February 23, 2007
At Kasukabe's urging, Madarame sets out in search of a less otaku-ish outfit. Later, a heart-to-heart over sushi reveals that they might not be from completely different worlds after all. Unfortunately, this only confuses him more.
OVA–3	"Then I'll Undress You!"; Transliteration: "Jā, Nugashite ageru!" (Japanese: じゃあ、脱がしてあげるッ!)	April 25, 2007
The school festival approaches, and Ohno is committed to another cosplay photo shoot. But tension brews as Ogiue scoffs at the idea of cosplay, and Ohno finds Tanaka's secret stash of costumes for the other Genshiken girls. Caught in the middle with the photo shoot only minutes away, Kasukabe hatches a scheme to smooth things over, and even get Ogiue to try something she's never done before...

== Genshiken Pt.2 ==
No.	Title	Original release date (Note: Genshiken Pt.2 aired on Chiba TV and TV Saitama on Tuesday 25:30, effectively Wednesday at 1:30 a.m. JST.)
1	"The New President's Intentions"; Transliteration: "Shin-Kaichō no Kokorozashi" (Japanese: 新会長のココロザシ)	October 10, 2007
Things are looking up for Sasahara as the Genshiken secures a spot among the dōjinshi vendors at the next Comifes, but the devil is in the details as they quickly need to figure out the finer points of actually making one. An unexpected relief comes when Ogiue actually volunteers her services (if in limited quantities), but will the new President have what it takes to stand up to the other obstacles in their way?
2	"Friction at the Club Meeting"; Transliteration: "Kaigi wa Momeru" (Japanese: 会議はモメル)	October 17, 2007
It's nearing the end of July, and with the deadline for finishing their dōjinshi looming, all the club has to show are the two pages drawn by Ogiue. With Kugayama's continued lack of material pushing the deadline (and Sasahara's patience) to the limit, it looks like they'll have to put aside their differences (and their sleep cycles) to get things done on time.
3	"One Hot Summer's Day"; Transliteration: "Atsui Natsu no Ichinichi" (Japanese: アツい夏の一日)	October 24, 2007
The day of Genshiken's participation in Comifes has arrived, and they are finally set to take their place as a vendor. But despite (or because of) Haraguchi's "blessing," sales are initially slow. Ohno's arrival (in cosplay, naturally) seems to change their luck for the better, but things really get underway with a surprise appearance. How Kasukabe will react to it, however, is another matter entirely.
4	"Are You Going Out?"; Transliteration: "Dekiten Desu ka?" (Japanese: デキテンデスカ?)	October 31, 2007
Ohno likes Tanaka. Tanaka likes Ohno. Both, however, are too shy, and lacking confidence to make a first move. With the rest of Genshiken in a state of concern and confusion over their relationship, Ohno confides her anxieties to Kasukabe, who suggests a possible approach that may give both of them the courage to confide their affections.
5	"Madarame the Total Bottom"; Transliteration: "Madarame Sō-Uke" (Japanese: マダラメ総ウケ)	November 7, 2007
Ogiue catches Sasahara and Madarame in an unintentionally compromising position, setting her fujoshi imagination alight with various slash pairings between her fellow club members. She may have just found the inspiration to make a dōjinshi for next summer's Comifes, but her sketch of Sasahara gives Saki other ideas.
6	"An Issue of Taste"; Transliteration: "Shumi no Mondai" (Japanese: 趣味のモンダイ)	November 14, 2007
Genshiken is making preparations to go to the upcoming Winter Comifes as a group, but when the other members invite Ogiue along, she adamantly refuses. That doesn't stop her from appearing anyway in the guise of her high school persona to buy all the latest yaoi dōjinshi, but things get complicated as she (literally) runs into the rest of the club.
7	"Graduation Syndrome"; Transliteration: "Sotsugyō Shōkōgun" (Japanese: 卒業症候群)	November 21, 2007
Graduation time is finally upon Tanaka, Kugayama, and Madarame, and with it come emotional reflections on the past three years for the club. The presidential torch is passed on, and a Kujibiki Unbalance OVA finally gives closure to the first season, but what about Madarame's job hunt? And for that matter, what will become of the Genshiken under President Ohno?
8	"Cos-ken"; Transliteration: "Kosuken" (Japanese: こすけん)	November 28, 2007
It's the beginning of the school year, and Ohno is planning out her first year as the president of the Genshiken. How will the club change under her cosplay management? Also, Ogiue learns that she's accepted to Comifes and tries to work up the courage needed for her debut. But will the newest iteration of the club sink or swim, and will Kuchiki be Ohno's nemesis, or her unlikely savior?
9	"It Always Rains on the Job Hunt"; Transliteration: "Shūkatsu wa Itsu mo Ame" (Japanese: シューカツはいつも雨)	December 5, 2007
Sasahara's job search is not going as well as he'd hoped; at every turn, his negative portrayal of himself and uncertainty over his own beliefs make companies balk at hiring him. Meanwhile, Kousaka's absence is starting to get to Saki, while Ogiue struggles to draft her Comifes dōjinshi without any interference from Ohno's fetishes. But could Kuchiki be on to something about Sasahara and Ogiue?
10	"Otaku from the USA"; Transliteration: "Otaku Furomu USA" (Japanese: オタク·フロムUSA)	December 12, 2007
As Ogiue continues her preparations for Comifes, now a few days away, Angela Burton and Susanna Hopkins, two friends of Ohno's from the US show up unexpectedly to come to the convention as well. While the foreign otaku ways of Angela and Sue shake up the (somewhat) peaceful clubroom, perhaps Angela is the "sensible" one when it comes to understanding the feelings of others.
11	"Real Hardcore"; Transliteration: "Riaru Hādokoa" (Japanese: リアル·ハードコア)	December 19, 2007
As Comifes starts, Sasahara help Ogiue set up her doujinshi booth. Angela cosplays with Ohno in the costumes Tanaka made for them, while Sue wanders around the convention. Sue eventually obtains one of Ogiue's doujinshi books, and ask her to sign it, claiming it is "real hardcore." At a bathhouse, Ohno wonders why her plan to make Sasahara and Oguie a couple is failing. After Comifes is over, Sue and Angela leave to go back to the United States, with Ohno shipping the massive amounts of doujinshi to them later.
12	"What Lies Ahead..."; Transliteration: "Sono Saki ni Aru Mono..." (Japanese: その先にあるもの...)	December 26, 2007
Failing continually at his job interviews, Sasahara begins to lose sight of what he's working towards. He finds himself settling to apply for any available opening, and ends up on the brink of giving up altogether. It takes some harsh words and tough love from the rest of Genshiken to convince him to try one more time. And for that matter, how are the other members making out?

== Genshiken: Second Generation ==
No.	Title (Note: All English titles are taken from Crunchyroll.)	Original release date (Note: Genshiken: Second Generation aired on Tokyo MX on Saturday 25:00, effectively Sunday at 1:00 a.m. JST.)
1	"The other side of the path. The promised place." Transliteration: "Michi no Mukō, Yakusoku no Basho" (Japanese: 道のむこう、約束の場所)	July 7, 2013
With Ogiue as new president and several of the original members already graduated, four new members join the society: Ohno's friend Susanna, the loud Rika Yoshitake, the grumpy Mirei Yajima and the mysterious Hato Kenjirou. The new members join the club attracted by Ogiue's yaoi drawings. She welcomes the new members but fears the club will become a "rotten girl" (fujoshi) haven for yaoi fans and that is getting a bit too far removed from its original purpose.
2	"Cross over My Legs!"; Transliteration: "Ore no Ashi o Koete Yuke" (Japanese: 俺の脚を超えてゆけ)	July 14, 2013
Hato has a difficult time with Yajima and Yoshitake's obsession over his crossdressing. Keiko Sasahara, Kanji's kogal sister, appears in the club's room while Madarame is in there thinking about Saki Kasukabe. Ogiue recruits Genshiken members as employees to help in her manga artist work.
3	"Daydream Believer"; Transliteration: "Dei Dorīmu Birībā" (Japanese: 腐り姫の夢)	July 21, 2013
After Madarame lends a thankful Hato his place to change into girl's clothes, both start to become good friends. The group continues their work helping Ogiue finish the club's doujinshi for the Summer Comifes.
4	"Beards and Boobs"; Transliteration: "Hige to Boin" (Japanese: HIGE TO BOIN)	July 28, 2013
Angela returns to Japan to visit the Summer Comifes and do some cosplay with Ohno like she does every year. Two girls from Ogiue's past make an unexpected visit to the club's booth, much to Susanna's chagrin.
5	"Go Next!"; Transliteration: "Gō Nekusuto!!" (Japanese: 業 NEXT!!)	August 4, 2013
In the final day of the Summer Comifes, Angela's sudden and vocal interest in Madarame make him and the rest of the Genshiken have an utterly embarrassing moment. However, Hato's timely confession to the group may be even more shocking than that.
6	"Shout "Moe!" Beyond the Event Horizon"; Transliteration: "Inga Chihei no Kanata de, Moe o Sakebu" (Japanese: 因果地平の彼方で、モエをさけぶ)	August 11, 2013
The group has to deal with the aftermath of Hato's confession and its embarrassing (but hilarious) effects on Madarame, Kuchiki and the rest of the Genshiken. A relative of Yoshitake visits the club's room to know more about the University and the otaku society.
7	"KOIBANA3"; Transliteration: "Koibana Surī" (Japanese: KOIBANA3)	August 18, 2013
Ogiue plans to make a romance manga story for the club's magazine that is going to be published at the Campus Festival, so she asks the members of Genshiken about their past relationships during High School for inspiration. Hato reveals the full extent of his artistic skills and the strange condition that limits them.
8	"There's a Route, but There's No Loop!"; Transliteration: "Rūto wa Attemo Rūpu wa Nai" (Japanese: ルートはあってもループはない)	August 25, 2013
Hato talks with Madarame at his apartment to apologize for his actions during the last Comifes. The members of the otaku society struggle to complete their manga stories for the club's magazine.
9	"White Gate Keeper"; Transliteration: "Howaito Gēto Kīpā" (Japanese: ホワイトゲートキーパー)	September 1, 2013
The Genshiken members successfully participate in the Campus Festival activities, but several different persons from Hato's High School days make an unexpected appearance at the University.
10	"Snow Man"; Transliteration: "Sunō Man" (Japanese: Snow man)	September 8, 2013
Hato comes to terms with his past and finally reveals the true reasons for his crossdressing. Saki Kasukabe arrives at the Campus Festival just in time to discover Madarame and Susanna in a compromising position.
11	"That Was a Good Last Episode"; Transliteration: "Ii Saishūkai Datta" (Japanese: いい最終回だった)	September 15, 2013
In the epilogue of Hato's revelation another situation ensues. Madarame and Saki are tricked to be reunited alone in the club's room by Sasahara and a dubious Hato.
12	"Love and Work and Cheesecake!"; Transliteration: "Koi to Shigoto to Chīzukēki" (Japanese: 恋と仕事とチーズケーキ)	September 22, 2013
After a long and emotional struggle Madarame finally has confessed his feelings to Saki (sort of). Both new and old members of the Genshiken support their fellow otaku friend in the only way they know. Ohno's angst about her future with Tanaka and life after graduation make her cosplay to an extreme.
13	"Waiting in the Club Room"; Transliteration: "Ano Bushitsu de Matteru" (Japanese: あの部室で待ってる)	September 29, 2013
The Genshiken club members travel together to a spa resort. By using her own personal experiences as an example, president Ogiue gives a troubled Hato some important lessons about love, friendship and mutual understanding.

== Genshiken: Second Season OAD ==
No.	Title	Original release date
1	"Neverending Earthly Desires"; Transliteration: "Bonnō wa Tomedo Naku" (Japanese: ボンノーはとめどなく)	December 20, 2013
Some time before the events of the Genshiken: Second Season TV series, Susanna and Angela visit Japan during New Year's Eve. Susanna stays over at Ogiue's apartment while planning to study at the same University. The original members of the Genshiken organize a New Year’s shrine visit with their American guests.

== Anime theme songs ==
Opening themes
"Kujibiki Unbalance" (くじびきアンバランス) by Under17 (episode 1)
"My Pace Daioh" (マイペース大王; "King of My Own Pace") by Manzo (episodes 2–12)
"Seishun to Shite" (青春として; "As Our Youth") by Manzo (episodes 13–15)
"disarm dreamer" by Aki Misato (Genshiken 2 episodes 2–12)
"Genshi, Joshi wa, Taiyo Datta" by Sumire Uesaka and Kabuki Rocks (Genshiken: Second Season episodes 1–13)

Ending themes
"Biidama" (びいだま; 'Marble') by Saori Atsumi (episodes 1–15, Genshiken 2 episode 7)
"Clubhouse Sandwich" (クラブハウスサンド, Kurabuhausu Sando) by Yūmao (Genshiken 2 episodes 1–2, 4–6, 8–12)
"Ai" (あい; 'Love') by Saori Atsumi (Genshiken 2 episode 3; opening theme to Kujibiki Unbalance series 2)
"Aoku Yureteiru" (アオくユレている) by Nozomi Yamamoto, Sumire Uesaka, Yumi Uchiyama and Ai Kakuma (Genshiken: Second Season episodes 1–13)
"Signpost" by Nozomi Yamamoto (Genshiken: Second Season OAD)
