= Castle Point Anime Convention =

Annual anime convention in New Jersey, US

Coordinates: 40°47′18″N 74°2′31″W

- Official logo for the Castle Point Anime Convention
- Status: Active
- Genre: Anime, Manga, and Video Games
- Frequency: Annual
- Venue: Meadowlands Exposition Center
- Location: Secaucus, New Jersey
- Country: United States
- Inaugurated: 2008
- Attendance: 4,986 in 2025
- Organizer: Anime Critics United, Inc.
- Website: www.castlepointanime.com

Castle Point Anime Convention (abbreviated as CPあC) is an annual two-day anime convention held during April/May at the Meadowlands Exposition Center in Secaucus, New Jersey. The convention was previously organized by the Stevens Institute of Technology's Stevens Anime Club, and was located on campus for several years.

== Programming ==
The convention typically offers an Artist's Alley, card games, dance, dealers' room, masquerade, musical performances, panels, video games, and workshops.

== History ==
CPAC 2020 was canceled due to the COVID-19 pandemic. The convention held a virtual event for 2021.

=== Event history ===
Dates	Location	Attendance	Guests
April 13, 2008	Stevens Institute of Technology; Hoboken, New Jersey	693	Bit Shifter, Andy Brick, Nullsleep, Peelander-Z, and Uncle Yo.
March 29, 2009	Stevens Institute of Technology; Hoboken, New Jersey	1,016	Bit Shifter, Bubblyfish, MC Frontalot, No Carrier, and Bill Rogers.
April 11, 2010	Stevens Institute of Technology; Hoboken, New Jersey	1,600	Rome Elliot, Michele Knotz, Kenneth Robert Mario, Michael Perreca, Bill Rogers, Katie Tiedrich, and Uncle Yo.
April 10, 2011	Stevens Institute of Technology; Hoboken, New Jersey	2,149	Michele Knotz, Mike Pollock, Bill Rogers, Katie Tiedrich, and Uncle Yo.
April 1, 2012	Stevens Institute of Technology; Hoboken, New Jersey	2,030	
April 7, 2013	Stevens Institute of Technology; Hoboken, New Jersey	2,665	
April 6, 2014	Stevens Institute of Technology; Hoboken, New Jersey	3,366	Crispin Freeman, Michele Knotz, Ian Rubin, and Katie Tiedrich.
March 29, 2015	Stevens Institute of Technology; Hoboken, New Jersey	4,516	+2 Comedy, The Asterplace, Jamie Marchi, Mike Pollock, Rainbow Bubble Girls, Monica Rial, and Ian Rubin.
April 23–24, 2016	Stevens Institute of Technology; Hoboken, New Jersey	5,165	Akira, Crusher-P, Jessie James Grelle, Lauren Landa, The Manly Battleships, Alain Mendez, Bryce Papenbrook, Tokyo Attack!, Lex Winter, DJ Sanchez, and Immobius.
April 29–30, 2017	Stevens Institute of Technology; Hoboken, New Jersey	3,961	Crusher-P, Richard Epcar, Kyle Hebert, The Manly Battleships, and Vocamerica.
May 19–20, 2018	Meadowlands Exposition Center; Holiday Inn Meadowlands; Secaucus, New Jersey	3,836	+2 Comedy, Morgan Berry, Justin Briner, Cosplay Pro-Wrestling, Crusher-P, The Manly Battleships, and Vocamerica.
April 27–28, 2019	Meadowlands Exposition Center; Holiday Inn Meadowlands; Secaucus, New Jersey		Tia Ballard, SungWon Cho, Chris Guerrero, Kohei Hattori, Elizabeth Maxwell, Vocamerica, and Lex Winter.
May 1–2, 2021	Online convention		
April 30 - May 1, 2022	Meadowlands Exposition Center; Secaucus, New Jersey	5,116	Brianna Knickerbocker, Shihori Nakane, StarsOfCassiopeia, Anne Yatco, Jenny Yokobori, Ginger Kitty, IGumDrop, Lilypichu, and White Rabbit.
April 29-30, 2023	Meadowlands Exposition Center; Secaucus, New Jersey	4,844	Adam McArthur, Kaiji Tang, and Anne Yatco.
April 27-28, 2024	Meadowlands Exposition Center; Secaucus, New Jersey		Lizzie Freeman, Caitlin Glass, Kayli Mills, and SHiNNOSUKE.
April 26-27, 2025	Meadowlands Exposition Center; Secaucus, New Jersey	4,986	Bryson Baugus, SungWon Cho, Emi Lo, Keith Silverstein, and Emi Nitta.
April 25-26, 2026	Meadowlands Exposition Center; Secaucus, New Jersey		Kira Buckland, Ricco Fajardo, Lotus Juice, Zeno Robinson, Shu Uchida, and Yuina.
