= Michael Perreca =

American director

Michael Perreca is an American director. In 1993 he directed The Wind and the Willows by Douglas Post.

In 1999 he was named artistic director of the Bristol Valley Theater in Naples, NY. He was Producing Director of the acclaimed Barrington Stage Company in Massachusetts, including serving as Other Stages Producer https://www.mtishows.com/show-full-billing/1813. He has directed throughout the U.S., and extensively in New York City and the Northeast. In addition to directing, he also voiced the main role of Kanji Sasahara in Genshiken and Kujibiki Unbalance. He can be heard on Gokudo, Shingu, Comic Party and Gravitation. As an actor, he was seen as Manny the Cabby on "Pelican Park" PBS-Boston.

Perreca is presently an adjunct lecturer at City University of New York-Brooklyn College and a creative director/event writer for large-scale fundraising events. These events include The New York Yankees Homecoming Dinner, The Statue of Liberty/Ellis Island Awards, UNCF "A Mind Is…" Gala, Brooklyn Tech Centennial Celebration and Titans of Tech, The Alzheimer's Association Rita Hayworth Gala, United Way Gridiron Gala, Partnership With Children Gala, and the Financial Women's Association "Women of the Year" Awards, among others. He was Artistic Director, Theater Programs, at LeAp-Learning through an Expanded Arts Program, Inc. https://www.pbs.org/video/leap-helps-youth-schools-through-theater-hlqqcl/ There, he oversaw The New York City August Wilson Monologue Competition and LEAP Onstage Playwriting Program https://www.broadwayworld.com/article/NYC-Teen-Playwrights-Premiere-Plays-at-Leap-Onstage-Event-20170531. He's performed and directed Off Broadway and throughout the U.S. https://playbill.com/article/tada-to-offer-musical-moon-in-ny-com-69090 Perreca was also Executive Director of Royal Family Productions in Manhattan, and Interim Director of Development at the Drama Desk Award-winning companies York Theatre Company and TADA! Youth Theater.

As a journalist, he held positions as managing editor of "Network Computing" magazine and senior editor of "Food & Beverage Marketing" magazine. He spent years as a freelance writer and editor, contributing to national publications such as "Rolling Stone" ("Marketing Through Music" supplement), "Marketing Week," "HomePC," "Marketing Computers," and both Fodor’s and Birnbaum’s travel guide books. He edited the books "Internet Messaging" and "The Best Little Book of Public Speaking Tips You’ll Ever Own," as well as providing some editing for "C'est La Vie: Life, Love and New Hope: The Ingredients of an Authentic French Bakery."
