= Tilo Schmitz =

German voice actor

- Born: 1959 (age 65–66); Radebeul, Bezirk Dresden, East Germany
- Occupation: voice actor

Tilo Schmitz (born 1959) is a German voice actor from Radebeul. Having a deep, sonorous, basso voice, Schmitz is the official dub-over artist of Christopher Judge, Michael Clarke Duncan, Ving Rhames, Abraham Benrubi and Ron Perlman.

== Roles ==
=== Television animation ===
- The Angry Beavers (Truckee)
- Beast Machines (Optimus Primal)
- Code Geass (Bismarck von Waldstein)
- Digimon Adventure (Apocalymon)
- Digimon Tamers (Baihumon)
- Digimon Data Squad (Ivan)
- Eureka Seven (Kengō)
- Genshiken (Mitsunori Kugayama)
- Ghost in the Shell: Stand Alone Complex (Batō)
- Ghost in the Shell: S.A.C. 2nd GIG (Batō)
- Invader Zim (Almighty Tallest Purple)
- Looney Tunes (Yosemite Sam)
- Lupin III (Daisuke Jigen)
- Mighty Ducks (Check "Grin" Hardwing)
- Sabrina, the Animated Series (Spookie Jar)
- Shuriken School (Principal of Katana)
- Transformers: Animated (Bulkhead)
- The Wacky World of Tex Avery (Sagebrush Sid)

=== Original video animation ===
- Aladdin and the King of Thieves (Cassim)
- The Little Mermaid II: Return to the Sea (Undertow)
- Mickey, Donald, Goofy: The Three Musketeers (Captain Pete)

=== Theatrical animation ===
- The Ant Bully (The Glow Worm)
- Asterix and the Vikings (Obelix)
- Asterix the Gaul (2001 dub) (Majestix)
- Atlantis: The Lost Empire (Doctor Joshua Sweet)
- Barnyard (Miles)
- Beauty and the Beast (The Stove)
- Bee Movie (Ken)
- Big Hero 6 (Yama)
- Brave (Lord MacGuffin)
- The Castle of Cagliostro (Daisuke Jigen)
- Digimon: The Movie (Keramon, Infermon, Diaboromon)
- Dragon Hunters (Fat John)
- Ferdinand (Valiente's Father)
- Final Fantasy: The Spirits Within (Ryan Whittaker)
- Free Birds (Chief Massasoit)
- Ghost in the Shell (Batō)
- Ghost in the Shell 2: Innocence (Batō)
- Ice Age: Continental Drift (Captain Gutt)
- Inside Out 2 (Deep Dark Secret)
- The Jungle Book 2 (Ranjan's Father)
- Kung Fu Panda (Commander Vachir)
- Lilo & Stitch (Cobra Bubbles)
- Niko & The Way to the Stars (Leader)
- The Sea Beast (Captain Crow)
- Sinbad: Legend of the Seven Seas (Kale)
- Sing (Big Daddy)
- Spirit: Stallion of the Cimarron (Murphy)
- Tangeld (Vladimir)
- The Angry Birds Movie 2 (Hank)
- The Many Adventures of Winnie the Pooh (second dub) (Eeyore)
- The SpongeBob SquarePants Movie (Dennis)
- Team America: World Police (Spottswoode)
- Titan A.E. (Professor Sam Tucker)
- The Star (Thaddeus)
- The Weathering Continent (Gaten Rakumu)
- The Wild (Blag)

=== Video games ===
- Kingdom Hearts II (Pete)
- Dragon Age II (Varric)
- Dragon Age: Inquisition (Varric)
- Star Wars Jedi Knight II: Jedi Outcast (Desann)
- Destroy All Humans! (2020 video game) (Crypto 137)
- Crysis (Prophet)
- Left 4 Dead 2 (Coach)
- The Legend of Zelda: Tears of the Kingdom (Ganondorf)

=== Live action ===
- 24 (excluding the first season) (David Palmer)
- 300 (King Leonidas)
- Agent Cody Banks (Francois Molay)
- Armageddon (Jayotis "Bear" Kurleenbear)
- Buffy the Vampire Slayer (Adam)
- Christopher Robin (Eeyore)
- Close to Home (Detective Ed Williams)
- Con Air (Nathan "Diamond Dog" Jones)
- Daredevil (The Kingpin)
- The Dark Knight (Tattooed Prisoner)
- Die Another Day (Mister Kil)
- Dinosaurs (Harris)
- Dodgeball: A True Underdog Story (Me'Shell Jones)
- Eragon (Ajihad)
- Fantastic Four: Rise of the Silver Surfer (General Hager)
- Flubber (Wesson)
- Garfield: The Movie (Luca)
- Goosebumps (German opening title narration)
- The Golden Compass (Iorek Byrnison)
- Hellboy (Hellboy)
- Hellboy II: The Golden Army (Hellboy)
- Homicide (Robert Randolph)
- The Incredible Hulk (General Joe Geller)
- The Island (Jamil Starkweather)
- Kiss of Death (Omar)
- Lemony Snicket's A Series of Unfortunate Events (Detective)
- Léon (Malky)
- A Life Less Ordinary (Jackson)
- Looney Tunes: Back in Action (Yosemite Sam)
- The Mummy (High Priest Imhotep)
- Pirates of the Caribbean: The Curse of the Black Pearl (Bo'sun)
- Planet of the Apes (Colonel Attar)
- Pulp Fiction (Marsellus Wallace)
- Pushing Daisies (Emerson Cod)
- Scary Movie 4 (Shaquille O'Neal)
- School for Scoundrels (Lesher)
- The Scorpion King (Balthazar)
- See Spot Run (Murdoch)
- Sin City (Manute)
- Spider-Man (Bonesaw McGraw)
- Stargate SG-1 (Teal'c)
- Starship Troopers (Sergeant Zim)
- Star Trek: Deep Space Nine (Gul Dukat)
- Talladega Nights: The Ballad of Ricky Bobby (Lucius Washington)
- Wander Over Yonder (Lord Hater)
- What's the Worst That Could Happen? (Uncle Jack)
- The Whole Nine Yards (Franklin "Frankie Figs" Figueroa)
- X-Men (Sabretooth)
- Zathura: A Space Adventure (Robot)
