= Takanori Ōyama =

Japanese actor, voice actor and playwright

- 大山 鎬則
- Born: March 8, 1974 (age 51); Aichi Prefecture, Japan
- Occupations: Actor; voice actor; playwright
- Agent: Office Osawa

Takanori Ōyama (大山 鎬則, Ōyama Takanori; born March 8, 1974) is a Japanese actor, voice actor and playwright from Aichi Prefecture, Japan. He is probably most known for the roles as Kanji Sasahara (Genshiken) and Yasunobu Hattori (Suzuka).

== Filmography ==
=== Stage ===
- Nodame Cantabile (live-action TV drama) (as Michael (Puri Gorota - ep 4))
- Reborn! (Rebocon 2010) (as Byakuran)

=== Anime ===
- Genshiken (Voice of Kanji Sasahara)
- Genshiken 2 (Voice of Kanji Sasahara)
- Nodame Cantabile (Voice of Michael (Puri Gorota - ep 7))
- Suzuka (Voice of Yasunobu Hattori)
- Yu-Gi-Oh! GX (Voice of Ikazuchimaru)
- Zegapain (Voice of Kuroshio)
- Reborn! (Voice of Byakuran)
- Little Battlers Experience wars (Voice of Takao Ooyama)

=== OVA ===
- Genshiken (Voice of Kanji Sasahara)

=== Tokusatsu ===
- Uchu Sentai Kyuranger (Voice of Media Tsuyoindaver (ep 23))
