= Tetsujin 28-go (2004 TV series) =

2004 television series

鉄人28号 (Tetsujin Nijūhachi-gō)
- Genre: Adventure, dieselpunk, science fiction, mecha
- Created by: Mitsuteru Yokoyama
- Anime television series
- Directed by: Yasuhiro Imagawa
- Written by: Yasuhiro Imagawa
- Music by: Akira Senju
- Studio: Palm Studio
- Licensed by: NA: Discotek Media; UK: Manga Entertainment
- Original network: TXN (TV Tokyo)
- Original run: April 7, 2004 – September 29, 2004
- Episodes: 26
- Video game
- Developer: Sandlot
- Publisher: Bandai
- Music by: Masafumi Takada; Jun Fukuda
- Genre: Action
- Platform: PlayStation 2
- Released: JP: July 1, 2004
- Anime film

The Morning Moon of Midday
- Directed by: Yasuhiro Imagawa
- Written by: Yasuhiro Imagawa
- Music by: Akira Ifukube
- Studio: Palm Studio
- Licensed by: NA: Discotek Media
- Released: March 31, 2007
- Runtime: 95 minutes

Tetsujin 28-gō (Japanese: 鉄人28号, Hepburn: Tetsujin Nijūhachi-gō; literally "Iron Man No. 28") is a 2004 Japanese anime series based on the manga of the same name by Mitsuteru Yokoyama. It was animated by Genco and Palm Studio and written and directed by Yasuhiro Imagawa. The series has been released in the United States under its original name by Geneon and in the United Kingdom by Manga Entertainment, the first time a Tetsujin-28 property has not been localized to Gigantor in America or other English speaking nations. It was then rescued by Discotek Media for a SD Blu-ray release on September 25, 2018, with the movie (being released as Morning Moon of Midday) released on sub-only Blu-ray + DVD Combo Pack on January 29, 2019. While not fully based on the original manga, it followed an extremely different storyline than in the 1960s series.

== Plot ==
The story takes place c. 1955, ten years after the end of World War II in Asia, approximately the same time as the manga debuted, focused mainly on Shotaro's pursuit to control and fully understand Tetsujin's capabilities, all the while encountering previous creations and scientists from the Tetsujin Project.

== Cast ==
- Shotaro Kaneda Voiced by: Motoko Kumai (Japanese); Reece Thompson; Nathan Tipple (English)
- Professor Shikishima Voiced by: Shigeru Ushiyama (Japanese); Michael Kopsa (English)
- Chief Ootsuka Voiced by: Minoru Inaba (Japanese); Don Brown (English)
- Kenji Murasame Voiced by: Yūji Mikimoto (Japanese); Brian Drummond (English)
- Dr. Furanken Voiced by: Taimei Suzuki (Japanese); French Tickner (English)

== Episodes ==
#	Title	Original airdate
1	"The Resurrection of Shotaro" "Yomigaeru Shōtarō" (蘇る正太郎)	April 7, 2004
2	"No. 27 Vs. No. 28" "Nijūhachi-gō tai Nijūshichi-gō" (27号対28号)	April 14, 2004
3	"The Arrival of Monster Robot" "Kai-robotto Arawaru" (怪ロボット現る)	April 21, 2004
4	"The Other Tetsujin Project" "Mō Hitotsu no Tetsujin Keikaku" (もうひとつの鉄人計画)	April 28, 2004
5	"Tetsujin Vs. Black Ox" "Tetsujin tai Burakku Okkusu" (鉄人対ブラックオックス)	May 5, 2004
6	"The Hunt for the Remote Control Box" "Ubawareta Sōjūki" (奪われた操縦機)	May 12, 2004
7	"Tetsujin Goes on a Crime Spree" "Aku no Tesaki Tetsujin Abareru" (悪の手先鉄人暴れる)	May 19, 2004
8	"The Plan to Recapture Tesujin NO. 28" "Tetsujin Nijūhachi-gō Dakkai Sakusen" (鉄人28号奪回作戦)	May 26, 2004
9	"The Space Rocket Murders" "Uchū Roketto Satsujin Jiken" (宇宙ロケット殺人事件)	June 2, 2004
10	"The Super Human Kelly" "Nazo no Chōningen Kerī" (謎の超人間ケリー)	June 9, 2004
11	"The End of Super Human Kelly" "Chōningen Kerī no Saigo" (超人間ケリーの最後)	June 16, 2004
12	"The Melancholy of Doctor Black" "Burakku-hakase no Yūutsu" (ブラック博士の憂鬱)	June 23, 2004
13	"The Glowing Entity" "Hikaru Buttai" (光る物体)	June 30, 2004
14	"Black Mask the Phantom Thief" "Kaitō Burakku Masuku" (怪盗ブラックマスク)	July 7, 2004
15	"Furanken's Assistants" "Furanken no Deshi-tachi" (不乱拳の弟子たち)	July 14, 2004
16	"Kyoto Burns" "Kyōto Moyu" (京都燃ゆ)	July 21, 2004
17	"The Kokuryumaru Incident" "Kokuryū-maru Jiken" (黒龍丸事件)	July 28, 2004
18	"Shotaro Alone" "Shotaro Hitori..." (正太郎一人...)	August 4, 2004
19	"Confrontation with Nikoponski" "Nikoponsukī to no Taiketsu" (ニコポンスキーとの対決)	August 11, 2004
20	"The Phantom of Madara Rocks" "Madara-iwa no Kaijin" (まだら岩の怪人)	August 18, 2004
21	"The PX Syndicate Conspiracy" "PX-dan no Inbō" (PX団の陰謀)	August 25, 2004
22	"The End of the Rampage" "Bōsō no Hate ni..." (暴走の果てに...)	September 1, 2004
23	"Tetsujin on Trail" "Sabakareru Tetsujin" (裁かれる鉄人)	September 8, 2004
24	"Shikishima Alive" "Ikiteita Shikishima" (生きていた敷島)	September 15, 2004
25	"The Danger at Kurobe" "Kurobe no Kiki" (黒部の危機)	September 22, 2004
26	"Crime and Punishment" "Tsumi to Batsu" (罪と罰)	September 29, 2004

== Video game ==
In July 2004, a video game was released for the PlayStation 2 developed by Sandlot and published by Bandai. In it the players control Tetsujin 28 from the point of view of Shotaro Kaneda. The control method is slightly simplified compared to Sandlot's other giant robot games such as Robot Alchemic Drive, allowing them to fly Tetsujin 28, and well as have him pick up buildings, enemies, and even Shotaro to safely transport him away from a battle zone. The game uses the same voice actors from the series, though it takes presentation cues from the original 1950's manga, as well as the kaiju film genre.

== Reception ==
Tetsujin 28-gō mostly positive reception from critics.
