= Palm Studio =

Japanese animation studio

- Native name: 有限会社パルムスタジオ
- Romanized name: Yūgen-gaisha Parumu Sutaijo
- Type: Yūgen gaisha
- Industry: Japanese animation
- Predecessor: Triangle Staff
- Founded: March 1999
- Founder: Katsumi Yamaguchi
- Defunct: 2007
- Headquarters: Suginami, Tokyo, Japan

Palm Co., Ltd. (Japanese: 有限会社パルムスタジオ, Hepburn: Yūgen-gaisha Parumu Sutaijo) was a Japanese animation studio located in Suginami, Tokyo.

== History ==
The studio was founded in March 1999 by Triangle Staff former member Katsumi Yamaguchi and its first production was the film A Tree of Palme in 2001. Directed by Takashi Nakamura, the film was an official selection of the 2002 Berlin Film Festival. After having minor roles in 2002 TV series Saikano and Monkey Typhoon, Palm was the main studio under the production of Tetsujin 28-go and Genshiken, both in 2004. The studio produced Genshiken spin-off OVA series Kujibiki Unbalance. In 2006 it was the animation studio responsible for the TV version of Bartender. In 2007 it co-produced the TV series Master of Epic: The Animation Age with Gonzo and animated the film Tetsujin 28-go: Hakuchū no Zangetsu.

== Works ==
=== Television series ===
Debut	Series title	Director	Series composition	Music	No. of episodes	Original network	Notes
2004	Tetsujin 28-go	Yasuhiro Imagawa		Akira Senju	26	TXN	
2004	Genshiken	Takashi Ikehata	Michiko Yokote	Masanori Takumi	12	CTC	
2006	Bartender	Masaki Watanabe	Yasuhiro Imagawa	Kaoruko Ōtake	11	Fuji TV	
2007	Master of Epic: The Animation Age	Tetsuya Endō		For-Ever	12	TXN	Co-produced with Gonzo.

=== Films ===
- A Tree of Palme (2002)
- Tetsujin 28-go: The Morning Moon of Midday (2007)

=== OVAs ===
- Kujibiki Unbalance (2004–2005; production, animated by Ajia-do Animation Works)
