= Model robot =

Model figure kit

Model robots are model figures with origins in the Japanese anime genre of mecha. The majority of model robots are produced by Bandai and are based on the Gundam anime metaseries. This has given rise to the hobby's common name in Japan, Gunpla (or gan-pura, a Japanese portmanteau of "Gundam" and "plastic model"). Though there are exceptions, the model robot genre is dominated by anime tie-ins, with anime series and movies frequently serving as merchandising platform.

== Construction ==
Gundam kits are the most common and popular variety of mecha models exemplifying the general characteristics of models in the genre. Gundam kits are typically oriented toward beginners, and most often feature simple assembly, simple designs, and rugged construction—less durable than a pre-assembled toy, but more durable than a true scale model. The result is that the majority of Gundam kits feature hands and other parts that favor poseability or easy assembly over accurate shape. They may also exhibit various draft-angle problems, and features like antennae that are oversized to prevent breakage. For the most part, other kit lines and other kit manufacturers in the genre follow suit, though there are exceptions.

Because the subjects of model robot kits are typically humanoid and/or possess limbs, joints are required in order to make the finished model poseable. For decades, poly-caps were and still are used for this purpose, although they tend to degrade over time and thus have been less frequently used since the 2010s. Hard plastic joints generally exhibit greater friction than polyvinyl joints, and are similarly more durable than polystyrene joints. ABS joints, however, require greater precision in tooling to ensure easy assembly, and in some cases, they require screws and a small gap between parts.

One distinctive feature of model robot kits since the 1990s, as opposed to most other plastic model kits, is that they are molded in color: each part generally is made of a colored plastic corresponding to its intended color on the finished model. Bandai in particular has become well-known for its use of multi-color molding, which allows parts of different colors to be molded on the same sprue. In some cases, compromises have to be made - for instance, molding a part in an incorrect color, or a two-colored part in only one color - to ensure that the model is structurally stable and not overly complex, particularly when the intended retail price is low. One criterion by which enthusiasts assess the quality of a kit is its color-accuracy - that is to say, the correspondence between the molded color of the parts and the intended color of the finished model.

== Scale and Grade ==
Anime mecha subjects such as Gundam are most often portrayed as being between 15 and 20 meters tall, so the kits are scaled in a manner that brings the subject to an economical and manageable size. For machines in this size range, scales of 1:100 and 1:144 are most common, with 1:60 being reserved for larger (and usually more expensive or elaborate) kits. For smaller subjects, scales such as 1:20, 1:35, and 1:72 are also common. Bandai kits will commonly use a fairly extensive redesign, rather than the original design itself. Some of this inconsistency in representation may be due to the inherent difficulties in turning a 2D cel-animated design into a 3D design. Additionally, newer versions of the same model could be very different from an older version, due to better manufacturing technologies.

Gunpla kits are also sorted by a grading scale, which signals the complexity, and sometimes the art style, of the model.

== Practice ==
Gunpla is a major hobby in Japan, with entire magazines dedicated to variations on Bandai models. As mecha are fictional humanoid objects, there is considerable leeway for custom models and "kitbashes." A large amount of artistry goes into action poses and personalized variations on classic machines. There is also a market for custom resin kits which fill in gaps in the Bandai model line.

Gundam is not the only line of model robots. Eureka Seven, Neon Genesis Evangelion, Patlabor, Aura Battler Dunbine and Heavy Metal L-Gaim, to name a few, are all represented by Bandai model lines. Other manufacturers, such as Hasegawa, Wave, and Kotobukiya, have in recent years offered products from other series, such as Macross, Votoms, Five Star Stories, Armored Core, Virtual-On, Zoids, and Maschinen Krieger, with sales rivaling Bandai's most popular products.
