= Shimoku Kio =

Japanese manga artist (born 1974)

- Born: 1974 (age 51–52)
- Education: Tsukuba University
- Occupation: Manga artist
- Known for: Genshiken

Shimoku Kio (木尾 士目, Kio Shimoku; born 1974) is a Japanese manga artist best known for his manga Genshiken, which was originally serialized in Kodansha's Monthly Afternoon. Kodansha later published its volumes in Japan, and by Del Rey in the United States. Genshiken is an anime, manga, and light novel series about a college otaku club and its members.

== Works ==
- Ten no Ryoiki (点の領域) (1994, won Afternoon Four Seasons Award for debut works)
- Kagerou Nikki (陽炎日記) (1995–1996)
- Yonensei (四年生) (1997–1998)
- Gonensei (五年生) (1998–2000, sequel of Yonensei)
- Genshiken (げんしけん) (2002–2006)
- Kujibiki Unbalance (くじびきアンバランス) (2004, 2006 (anime), 2006–2007 (manga), original creator)
- Jigopuri (ぢごぷり) (2008–2010)
- Spotted Flower (2010–)
- Genshiken Nidaime (げんしけん 二代目) (2010–2016, sequel to Genshiken)
- Hashikko Ensemble (2018–2022)
