= Kujibiki Unbalance (2006 series) =

Japanese anime television series

- Cover for the series' first DVD volume

くじびき♥アンバランス (Kujibiki♥Anbaransu)
- Genre: Comedy; Slice of life
- Anime television series
- Directed by: Tsutomu Mizushima
- Written by: Michiko Yokote
- Music by: Tomoki Hasegawa
- Studio: Ajiado
- Licensed by: NA: AnimeWorks
- Original network: Kids Station
- Original run: October 7, 2006 – December 23, 2006
- Episodes: 12
- Light novel
- Written by: Tatsuya Hamazaki
- Published by: Media Factory
- Imprint: MF Bunko J
- Original run: November 2006 – December 28, 2007
- Volumes: 2
- Manga
- Written by: Shimoku Kio
- Illustrated by: Keito Koume
- Published by: Kodansha
- English publisher: NA: Del Rey Manga
- Imprint: Afternoon KC
- Magazine: Monthly Afternoon
- Original run: September 25, 2006 – December 25, 2007
- Volumes: 2
- icon

Kujibiki Unbalance (Japanese: くじびき♥アンバランス, Hepburn: Kujibiki♥Anbaransu; lit. 'Lottery Unbalance') (Note: Also referred to as Kujibiki "Heart" Unbalance to differentiate from its original incarnation.) is a 2006 anime series produced by Ajiado. It is based on the fictional story within a story anime and manga series Kujibiki Unbalance, originated from Shimoku Kio's manga series Genshiken. It is directed by Tsutomu Mizushima and written by Michiko Yokote. It aired in Kids Station in Japan from October to December 2006.

Notably different from the Genshiken version, it features redesigned characters and a new, yet familiar plot line. A manga adaptation by Keito Koume was serialized in Kodansha's seinen manga magazine Monthly Afternoon from September 2006 to December 2007.

== History ==
Kujibiki Unbalance was first made into a three-episode OVA between December 2004 and April 2005. The Kujibiki Unbalance television series was first announced as "Genshiken season 2" by Media Factory Inc. at Comiket 69 in late December 2005. This was later clarified in May 2006 as a 12-episode Kujibiki Unbalance series. Despite this, the DVD releases of this series do each include an OVA episode of Genshiken, for a total of three new episodes.

== Premise ==
At the gigantic and prestigious Rikkyouin academy the position of everyone in school is determined through a lottery. The school is ruled by the student council headed by the president who wears a giant helmet as a symbol of status. The anime follows the adventure of the four people who drew the lottery tickets to become next years student council. They must complete a variety of tasks set before them by the current student council, with failure resulting in immediate expulsion. The tasks will usually be of a mundane nature, but will inevitably end up in a dramatic fashion involving robots, aliens, terrorists, spies and so forth.

== Characters ==
Chihiro Enomoto (榎本 千尋, Enomoto Chihiro)
Voiced by: Fujiko Takimoto (Japanese); Rich McNanna (English)
The series protagonist. Up until his entrance into high school, he had always had miserable luck. He becomes a candidate for the next term's Student Council President. Five years earlier, he lost his parents in a traffic accident, and as such, he lives with his sister Shinobu.
Tokino Akiyama (秋山 時乃, Akiyama Tokino)
Voiced by: Ai Nonaka (Japanese); Veronica Taylor (English)
Chihiro's childhood friend, who ends up becoming a candidate for the next term's Student Council Vice-President alongside Chihiro.
Renko Kamishakujii (上石神井 蓮子, Kamishakujii Renko)
Voiced by: Kumiko Nishihara (Japanese); Angora Deb (English)
Candidate for next term's Student Council Secretary. She treats Kaoruko like a slave, and produces a variety of questionable inventions.
Koyuki Asagiri (朝霧 小雪, Asagiri Koyuki)
Voiced by: Kazuko Kojima (Japanese); Michele Knotz (English)
A student at Rikkyoin Academy's Elementary School division. She is extremely shy and introverted, but also very determined. With the help of Chihiro, she comes out of her shell.
Ritsuko Kübel Kettenkrad (律子·キューベル·ケッテンクラート, Ritsuko Kyūberu Kettenkurāto)
Voiced by: Ami Koshimizu (Japanese); Anna Morrow (English)
The current Student Council President. She is half-Japanese: her father is German and a CEO of a major company; her mother is Japanese. She is a childhood friend of Chihiro's, and lives in his neighborhood.
Kasumi Kisaragi (如月 香澄, Kisaragi Kasumi)
Voiced by: Yukana Nogami (Japanese); Rachael Lillis (English)
The current Student Council Vice-President who lives at a shrine. Despite her gentle demeanor and a feminine bearing she is extremely powerful.
Lisa Humvee (リサ·ハンビー, Risa Hanbī)
Voiced by: Reiko Takagi (Japanese); Dana Halsted (English)
The current Student Council Treasurer. She is a good-hearted, sociable, cheerful American girl.
Kaoruko Yamada (山田 薫子, Yamada Kaoruko)
Voiced by: Yūko Gotō (Japanese); Lisa Ortiz (English)
Kaoruko is Renko's "assistant" and always at her side.
Shinobu Enomoto (榎本 忍, Enomoto Shinobu)
Voiced by: Yuko Sasamoto (Japanese); Georgette Reilly (English)
Chihiro's older sister and a teacher at the academy. She has the outer appearance of a lovable person. In reality she is both mean and violent with a past of being the leader of a gang of delinquents.
Komaki Asagiri (朝霧 小牧, Asagiri Komaki)
Voiced by: Masayo Kurata (Japanese); Mandy Bonhomme (English)
Koyuki's older sister and a student at the academy. She is the manager of a small noodle shop that becomes the main characters favorite spot to hang out after school.

== Media ==
=== Anime ===
The series first aired in Kids Station from October 7 to December 23, 2006. (Note: Kujibiki Unbalance aired on Kids Station on Friday 24:00, effectively Saturday at 12:00 a.m. JST.) Saori Atsumi performed the series's opening theme "Ai" (あい; 'Love') while both Ai Nonaka and Ami Koshimizu performed the series ending theme "Harmonies". Like Genshiken, AnimeWorks licensed the series in North American territories.

No.	Title	Original release date
1	"Everyone Gets a Surprise at School (7 Points)"; Transliteration: "Minna, Gakkō de Odoroku. 7-ten ◐" (Japanese: みんな、がっこうでおどろく。7点 ◐)	October 7, 2006
On his first day at Rikkyoin Academy, Chihiro and his friend Tokino are selected to be the next term's Student Council President and Vice-President, respectively. Together with Renko, the candidate for Secretary, they must track down their group's Treasurer, who will disqualify the whole group unless they can all make it to the current President's office in less than 24 hours.
2	"You Must be Able to Keep a Promise. (2 Points)"; Transliteration: "Yakusoku o Mamorenai to dame da. 2-ten ●" (Japanese: やくそくをまもれないとだめだ。2点 ●)	October 14, 2006
Chihiro and his team are put in charge of running the school store, then must foil a bomb plot against Ritsuko before it's too late.
3	"Siblings Are a Pain. (6 Points)"; Transliteration: "Kyōdai ga Taihen da. 6-ten ◑" (Japanese: きょうだいがたいへんだ。6点 ◑)	October 21, 2006
Chihiro and company are put in charge of retrieving a panda that escaped from the zoo in order to avoid an international incident. Meanwhile, Shinobu plots to wrest her brother's attentions from the student council by means of a love potion.
4	"Shall We Pay a Visit on Sunday? (5 Points)"; Transliteration: "Nichiyōbi ni Asobō ka? 5-ten ◐" (Japanese: にちようびにあそぼうか。5点 ◐)	October 28, 2006
Chihiro's group is scolded for their antics while cleaning a pond. That weekend, Tokino convinces Chihiro to come to the school with her and retrieve something she forgot. The trip turns into an exploration of the entire campus, leading to an unexpected meeting with the President herself.
5	"Maybe Friends Will Understand (1 Point)"; Transliteration: "Tomodachi ga Wakaru kamo Shirenai. 1-ten ●" (Japanese: ともだちがわかるかもしれない。1点 ●)	November 4, 2006
It's summer vacation, and confronted with the prospect of spending it with the other Student Council candidates, Renko erupts in rage and stalks off alone to her family's summer house. Her departure shakes the normally-irrepressible Tokino, who holds herself responsible for Renko's behavior. But a chance reunion and a perilous situation, along with a little help from Kaoruko, may help show Renko what friendship really means.
6	"I'll Absolutely Keep it a Secret (8 Points)"; Transliteration: "Zettai, naisho ni shite okō. 8-ten" (Japanese: ぜったい、ないしょにしておこう。8点 ○)	November 11, 2006
Summer break has ended, and Chihiro & co.'s first assignment for the new term is to keep the school newspaper from folding by finding a scoop. However, Koyuki is terrified that with their cameras trained everywhere, her psychic powers (which she's hidden from even her team members) might come to light. Chihiro must find a scoop and protect Koyuki's secret, before the paper's deadline.
7	"I'll Listen to What My Superiors Say (4 Points)"; Transliteration: "Erai Hito no Hanashi o Kiku. 4-ten ◑" (Japanese: えらいひとのはなしをきく。4点 ◑)	November 18, 2006
The Student Council candidates are told of a massive spy infiltration at Rikkyoin, and are told to capture just one of them within a week's time. To that end, Tokino's classmate Izumi Tachibana is assigned to help Chihiro's group in their efforts. But Izumi is not what she seems, and Tokino's steadfast trust in her puts her in harm's way and at odds with Kasumi, the current Vice-President.
8	"I've Forgotten about the Past (7 Points)"; Transliteration: "Mukashi no Koto o Wasureteiru. 7-ten ◐" (Japanese: むかしのことをわすれている。7点 ◐)	November 25, 2006
Chihiro's peaceful weekend is interrupted by Tokino, who reminds him that it's Ritsuko's birthday. Despite not being invited, they are allowed into her party by a man who turns out to be her fiancé. Amongst the celebrations, memories and feelings (not to mention an elderly chicken) intertwine to make all three old friends question their relationship to each other.
9	"The Fireworks were beautiful (5 Points)"; Transliteration: "Hanabi ga Kirei ni Mieta. 5-ten ◐" (Japanese: はなびがきれいにみえた。5点 ◐)	December 2, 2006
Renko is kidnapped by the aliens from Episode 6, and the others must find her before their next assignment of serving VIPs during the Annual Rikkyoin fireworks festival.
10	"Although We Search for It, It Isn't There. (3 Points)"; Transliteration: "Sagashite mo, Soko ni wa nai. 3-ten ◐" (Japanese: さがしても、そこにはない。3点 ◐)	December 9, 2006
Koyuki gets kidnapped, and her sister is sent to investigate. Koyuki is brainwashed to be a psychic weapon. Komaki finds Koyuki's whereabouts and discovers that their brother was the kidnapper. When she returns defeated, the Student Council prohibits the others' involvement. However, Chihiro and the others resolve to mount a rescue.
11	"Stumbling in the Dark (0 Points)"; Transliteration: "Kurai Tokoro de Tsumazuku. 0 Ten ●" (Japanese: くらいところでつまずく。0点 ●)	December 16, 2006
The Student Council Candidates are suspended for their actions in the previous episode. During their suspension, Chihiro is called out by the Vice-president pretending to be Ritsuko. She tries to convince Chihiro to withdraw his candidacy, but she is barely stopped by Ritsuko. Her past relationship with Ritsuko is explored. Chihiro becomes unsure of himself.
12	"Let's Make Our Dreams Come True. (9 Points)"; Transliteration: "Yume o Kanaete Miyō. 9-ten ○" (Japanese: ゆめをかなえてみよう。9点 ○)	December 23, 2006
Tokino loses her good luck while being depressed about Chihiro. She confronts Ritsuko about Chihiro's withdrawal. Ritsuko confronts vice-president Kasumi about her rebellion, after which Chihiro is invited out by Ritsuko in casual dress. At the end, Chihiro was named President and is about to give his speech when a dove lands on his shoes.

=== Manga ===
A manga adaptation of the series, written and illustrated by Keito Koume, was serialized in Kodansha's seinen manga magazine Monthly Afternoon from September 25, 2006, (Note: Debuted in the magazine's November 2006 issue, released on September 25, 2006.) to December 25, 2007. (Note: Finished in the magazine's February 2008 issue, released on December 25, 2007.) The plot of the manga roughly follows that of the anime, though there are some deviations. Additionally, each volume of the manga adaptation also includes a bonus manga at the end, drawn by Shimoku Kio himself and featuring the characters from Genshiken at approximately the same time (in-universe) as the volume was originally released.

==== Volumes ====
No.	Original release date	Original ISBN	English release date	English ISBN
1	April 23, 2007	978-4-06-314450-5	July 22, 2008	978-0-345-50628-3
1. "Lottery #1" (一籤目, Ikkujime); 2. "Lottery #2" (二籤目, Nikujime); 3. "Lottery #3" (三籤目, Sankujime); 4. "Lottery #4" (四籤目, Yonkujime); 5. "Lottery #5" (五籤目, Gokujime); Bonus Manga: "Hanbii-san makes some dough?" (はんびーさん繁盛？記, Hanbī-san Hanjō? Ki); 6. "Lottery #6" (六籤目, Rokkujime); 7. "Lottery #7" (七籤目, Nanakujime); Bonus Manga: "Kujibiki♡Genshiken" (くじびき♡げんしけん)
Episodes 1 to 5 from the anime were adapted, except Chapter 7 that was adapted part of the light novel.
2	December 28, 2007	978-4-06-314483-3	December 30, 2008	978-0-345-50629-0
8. "Lottery #8" (八籤目, Hachikujime); 9. "Lottery #9" (九籤目, Kyūkujime); 10. "Lottery #10" (十籤目, Jūkujime); 11. "Lottery #11" (十一籤目, Jūichikujime); 12. "Lottery #12" (十二籤目, Jūnikujime); 13. "Lottery #13" (十三籤目, Jūsankujime); 14. "Lottery #14 (The Final Chapter)" (十四籤目〈最終話〉, Jūyonkujime (Saishū-wa)); Special Bonus Manga: "Kujibiki♡Genshiken" (くじびき♡げんしけん)
Episodes 3, 7, 8, 10, and 12 from the anime were adapted.

=== Video game ===
A video game, titled Kujibiki Unbalance: Kaichō Onegai Smash Fight (くじびき♥アンバランス 会長お願いすま～っしゅファイト☆; Kujibiki Unbalance: Kaichō Onegai Sumasshu Faito) lit. 'Lottery Unbalance: President, Please Smash Fight' is a video game developed by Marvelous Entertainment and Shade, and published by Marvelous Interactive for the PlayStation 2 on January 25, 2007. The game received a score of 20/40 from Famitsu, the lowest rated game of that week.
