= Kujibiki Unbalance =

Japanese OVA

- Title screen from the intro of Kujibiki Unbalance

くじびきアンバランス (Kujibiki Anbaransu)
- Genre: Slapstick comedy
- Original video animation
- Directed by: Takashi Ikehata
- Written by: Michiko Yokote
- Music by: Tomoki Hasegawa
- Studio: Ajia-do Animation Works (animation) (Note: Credited as (制作スタジオ; 'Work Studio')); Palm Studio (production)
- Licensed by: NA: Media Blasters
- Released: 22 December 2004 – 22 April 2005
- Episodes: 3
- Light novel
- Written by: Michiko Yokote
- Illustrated by: Kengo Yagumo
- Published by: Media Factory
- Imprint: MF Bunko J
- Original run: December 2004 – February 2006
- Volumes: 3

Kujibiki Unbalance (Japanese: くじびきアンバランス, Hepburn: Kujibiki Anbaransu; lit. 'Lottery Unbalance') is a three-episode original video animation spin-off of the Genshiken manga and anime series, as well as a series of three light novels by Genshiken anime collaborator Michiko Yokote. However, within the world of Genshiken, Kujibiki Unbalance has a 26-episode anime adaptation discussed by the main characters. The same characters also purchase associated products and adult-oriented doujinshi based on the series, which constitute the motivation for some of the "club activities" held by the Genshiken. Genshiken characters who are fans of Kujibiki Unbalance tend to refer to it by the shorthand name of Kuji-Un (くじアン, Kujian).

In essence, Kujibiki Unbalance is a compilation of many of the standard themes found in certain kinds of anime and manga series: childhood promises as the source of relationship drama, the influential yet shadowy Student Council, somewhat contrived scenarios designed to push the plot forward, mid-series "recaps" to remind viewers of previous events, and a sudden crisis that threatens to alienate the main characters and harms the outcome of the series. Kujibiki Unbalance is meant to be a stereotypical anime series, serving as both an homage to and a parody of the kinds of series that the otaku of Genshiken would enjoy.

The series was originally shown both as short "excerpts" within the Genshiken manga, as well as three full OVA episodes (labeled as episodes 1, 21, and 25 of an assumed 26-episode TV series) released to DVD with Genshiken in Japan. At Comiket 69, Media Factory announced the release of the second season of Genshiken, which was later clarified as being a 12-episode season of Kujibiki♥Unbalance. In a reversal of its OVA release alongside Genshiken, the DVD release of Kujibiki Unbalance included a total of three Genshiken OVA episodes, introducing the character Ogiue and continuing the plot of the manga from where the TV series left off.

== Characters ==
=== Tokino's Team ===
Chihiro Enomoto (榎本 千尋, Enomoto Chihiro)
Voiced by: Yuka Imai (Japanese); Rich McNanna (English)
Chihiro is the main male character of Kujibiki Unbalance. He is a good-natured person who is nicknamed "Happy Fortune" by his friend Mugio. His parents died when he was ten years old, and since then, Chihiro has been living with his seemingly irresponsible older sister. Having fended for himself for quite some time, he is excellent at cooking and cleaning.
Tokino Akiyama (秋山 時乃, Akiyama Tokino)
Voiced by: Akemi Kanda (Japanese); Veronica Taylor (English)
Tokino is a cheerful second-year student at Rikkyoin High who is the group's "President", thus being a candidate to be next year's Student Council President. She loves mushrooms to the point of obsession. Her knowledge of mushrooms is encyclopedic, as she knows them by sight and has an insatiable appetite for them. Tokino is often seen carrying around a book titled Mushrooms of the World.
Komaki Asagiri (朝霧 小牧, Asagiri Komaki)
Voiced by: Yukari Tamura (Japanese); Mandy Bonhomme (English)
A quiet and thoughtful girl, Komaki seems to be the sole caretaker for her younger triplet brothers and a frail younger sister called Koyuki. She is intelligent and does all chores to keep the house running well for the Asagiri siblings.=
Izumi Tachibana (橘 いづみ, Tachibana Izumi)
Voiced by: Yuko Kaida (OAV) Eri Nakao (TV series) (Japanese); Meg Francis (English)
Izumi is a tough and unsentimental girl who is often seen playing high-stakes games of Mahjong. She does her best to make her own living through gambling and shuns offers of outside help.

=== Renko's Team ===
Renko Kamishakujii (上石神井 蓮子, Kamishakujii Renko)
Voiced by: Ikue Otani (Japanese); Angora Deb (English)
Ranko is an overachieving girl who considers Tokino her arch-enemy. Their dynamic goes back to their days in kindergarten: it is revealed that Tokino once took so long in the bathroom that Renko, unable to wait any longer, wet herself. Ever since that time, Renko has made it her personal mission to somehow embarrass and humiliate Tokino in return. Renko has the unusual ability to read an entire book in under a minute—but unfortunately, she can only remember the information she has read for three minutes afterward.
Kaoruko Yamada (山田 薫子, Yamada Kaoruko)
Voiced by: Yūko Gotō (Japanese); Lisa Ortiz (English)
Kaoruko is a member of Renko's team who primarily tries to keep her calm, but often fails.

=== Current Student Council ===
Ritsuko Kübel Kettenkrad (律子・キューベル・ケッテンクラート, Ritsuko Kyūberu Kettenkurāto)
Voiced by: Saeko Chiba (Japanese); Zoe Fries (English)
Ritsuko is a half-German girl who is current President of the Student Council and Chihiro's childhood friend.
Kasumi Kisaragi (如月 香澄, Kisaragi Kasumi)
Voiced by: Ayako Kawasumi (Japanese); Rachael Lillis (English)
The vice-president and possibly secretary of the current student council. Like Izumi, Kasumi comes from a yakuza family, and lost her parents as a child. She always carries a sword. She is cold and reserved, a ferocious fighter, and she seems to have only allowed one person—Ritsuko—to be truly close to her. She also has a habit of speaking her mind, which at time frightens Risa.
Lisa Humvee (リサ・ハンビー, Risa Hanbī)
Voiced by: Kana Ueda (Japanese); Amanda Veautour (English)
Lisa is an American girl who knows how to speak in Kansai dialect.

=== Minor characters ===
Shinobu Enomoto (榎本 忍, Enomoto Shinobu)
Voiced by: Haruko Momoi (Japanese); Liz Johnson (English)
Shinobu is Chihiro's elder sister who is a math teacher at Rikkyoin. She is sometimes clumsy, often falling down sets of stairs and seems to really like sake.
Mugio Rokuhara (六原 麦男, Rokuhara Mugio)
Voiced by: Kenichi Suzumura (Japanese); Todd Gabreli (English)
Chihiro's good friend who is not competitive as his team lost early on, so he never got a chance to face-off against Chihiro's team.
Alex
Alex is a gun-wielding assassin who appears in episode 21. According to Genshiken, he showed up in earlier episodes, and is in the opening, so he could be more of an important character than he seems.

== Media ==
Note: Only episodes 1, 21, and 25 have actually been produced. The rest of the episode titles are those revealed in the next-episode previews of the produced episodes, or listed in Genshiken chapter 22, on page 89 of volume 4. The titles for episodes 13–18 are obscured by panel and word-balloon boundaries, though the titles for episodes 14 and 16 are given in Genshiken volume 5.

No.	Title
1	"An Encounter Unbalance"; Transliteration: "Deai wa Anbaransu" (Japanese: 出会いはアンバランス)
Chihiro enters Rikkyoin High and is placed into a team in the competition to determine the next student council in lottery. The first match is a culinary battle featuring a mushroom theme.
2 (N/A)	"Sturm und Drang! The Rikkyoin High Student Council Officers"; Transliteration: "Shippū Dotō! Rikkyōin Kōkō Seitokai Shikkōbu" (Japanese: 疾風怒濤! 立橋院高校生徒会執行部)
Unproduced.
3 (N/A)	"With Know-How Comes Luck!?"; Transliteration: "Un mo Jitsuryoku no Uchi!?" (Japanese: 運も実力のうち!?)
Unproduced, but it is one of the episodes revisited in episode 21. Chihiro's team must compete against a team of computer geeks in creating a website that gets the most hits within a certain amount of time. Their general interest topics are no match for their opponents' more prurient choice of content, until Tokino, Komaki, and Izumi come to the rescue in swimsuits.
4 (N/A)	"How high the moon"
Unproduced.
5 (N/A)	"I'm Sorry, Baby"; Transliteration: "Gomen ne Aka-chan" (Japanese: ごめんね赤ちゃん)
Unproduced.
6 (N/A)	"Seven People!?"; Transliteration: "Shichi-nin Iru!?" (Japanese: 七人いる!?)
Unproduced, but "revisited" in episode 21. Chihiro's team must engage in military operations against a seasoned group of pros. They are outmatched until they win over their opponents in an... unorthodox manner.
7 (N/A)	"A Fearsome Reward"; Transliteration: "Kyōfu no Hōshū" (Japanese: きょうふのほうしゅう)
Unproduced.
8 (N/A)	"A Sexily Modest Workbook"; Transliteration: "Etchi de Tsutsumashii Mondaishū" (Japanese: Hでつつましい問題集)
Unproduced, but at the end of Genshiken volume 3, this episode shows Madarame takes issue with the delivery of some of the lines. Wanting prove his point, he produces a VHS tape of said episode, thus the discussion turns into a re-watching.
9 (N/A)	"Shock Operation: Part-Time Job Full of Jellyfish"; Transliteration: "Doki' Kurage Darake no Arubaito Daisakusen" (Japanese: ドキッ☆クラゲだらけのアルバイト大作戦)
Unproduced.
10 (N/A)	"Clash!"; Transliteration: "Shōtotsu!" (Japanese: 衝突!)
Unproduced.
11 (N/A)	"With Know-How Comes Luck!? Returns"; Transliteration: "Un mo Jitsuryoku no Uchi!? Returns" (Japanese: 運も実力のうち!?)
Unproduced.
12 (N/A)	"Dance! Kujibiki Singing Match"; Transliteration: "Odoru! Kujibiki Utagassen" (Japanese: 踊る! くじびき歌合戦)
Unproduced, though seen "again" in episode 21. The order of the day seems to be a karaoke contest. The scene "replayed" in episode 21 shows everyone in the room trying to escape the horror of Tokino's singing voice.
14 (N/A)	"The Sickly Aliens"; Transliteration: "Taichō no Warui Uchūjin" (Japanese: 体調の悪い宇宙人)
Unproduced, but a clip from it can be seen in episode 21. Chihiro and his friends must face off against a trio of aliens from the planet Eldo. The intelligent, athletic, and beautiful aliens seem to have no weakness until Komaki secretly stumbles onto their secret that they have crippling digestive troubles.
16 (N/A)	"Christine of the Harbor"; Transliteration: "Minato no Kurisutīnu" (Japanese: 港のクリスティーヌ)
Unproduced, but it is mentioned in Genshiken volume 5, accompanied by several "screenshots" and commentary from Sasahara (under his pen name "Benjamin Takeyo").
19 (N/A)	"One Whole Night in a Storm"; Transliteration: "Arashi de Hitoban-jū" (Japanese: 嵐で一晩中)
Unproduced.
20 (N/A)	"An "18-and-Up Only" Heaven"; Transliteration: "Jūhachi-Kin Tengoku" (Japanese: 十八禁天国)
Unproduced.
21 (02)	"Great Highlights"; Transliteration: "Dai-Sōshūhen" (Japanese: 大総集編)
Chihiro's team reflects on a variety of matches they've been in thus far, including soccer, getting the most website hits, enduring a sauna and a freezer, military operations, a swimming race against aliens, a high-stakes game of Mahjong, and a dungeon battle adventure. According to Genshiken in volume 5, the attack on Ritsuko near the end of the episode was "added for the DVD version" and did not appear in the (fictional) broadcast version.
22 (N/A)	"Pianissimo..."; Transliteration: "Pianishimo..." (Japanese: ピアニシモ。。。)
Unproduced.
23 (N/A)	"My Banner"; Transliteration: "Ore no Hata" (Japanese: 俺の旗)
Unproduced.
24 (N/A)	"Chocolate Battle! Confessing, and Being Confessed to..." Transliteration: "Choko Batoru! Kokutte Kokurarete..." (Japanese: チョコバトル! 告って告られて。。。)
Unproduced.
25 (03)	"Kujibiki Forever"; Transliteration: "Kujibiki yo, Eien ni" (Japanese: くじびきよ、永遠に)
Chihiro's team splits up after the members have second thoughts about the competition. However, Chihiro regains the will to continue after a chance encounter with Ritsuko at his parents' grave, and works to convince his teammates to keep fighting.
26 (N/A)	"Lottery Unbalance"; Transliteration: "Kujibiki Anbaransu" (Japanese: くじびきアンバランス)
Unproduced. In Genshiken, this episode is postponed due to a typhoon, and it has not yet aired as of the end of volume 4. It is later suggested that it is not as much of a "wrap-up" as the penultimate episode.
