= Genshiken =

Japanese manga series and its franchise

- First tankōbon volume cover, featuring (clockwise from bottom) Saki Kasukabe, Mitsunori Kugayama, Harunobu Madarame, and Kanji Sasahara

げんしけん
- Genre: Comedy; Slice of life
- Manga
- Written by: Shimoku Kio
- Published by: Kodansha
- English publisher: NA: Del Rey Manga (expired); Kodansha USA
- Imprint: Afternoon KC
- Magazine: Monthly Afternoon
- Original run: April 25, 2002 – August 25, 2016
- Volumes: 21
- Series titles
- Genshiken; (2002–2006, 9 volumes); Genshiken: Second Season; (2010–2016, 12 volumes)
- Anime television series
- Directed by: Takashi Ikehata
- Produced by: Takaya Ibira; Atsushi Yamamori; Naoki Sakamoto; Kōji Tsukamoto; Katsumi Yamaguchi
- Written by: Michiko Yokote
- Music by: Masanori Takumi
- Studio: Palm Studio
- Licensed by: NA: Media Blasters
- Original network: CTC, TV Saitama, Sun TV, tvk, Kids Station
- Original run: October 11, 2004 – December 27, 2004
- Episodes: 12
- Original video animation
- Directed by: Tsutomu Mizushima
- Produced by: Takaya Ibira; Naoki Sakamoto; Kōji Tsukamoto; Ryūichirō Matsuyama
- Written by: Michiko Yokote
- Music by: Tomoki Hasegawa
- Studio: Ajiado
- Licensed by: NA: Media Blasters
- Released: December 22, 2006 – April 25, 2007
- Episodes: 3
- Anime television series

Genshiken 2
- Directed by: Kinji Yoshimoto
- Produced by: Takaya Ibira; Takurō Hatakeyama; Tatsuhiro Nitta; Osamu Koshinaka; Yūsuke Numagi
- Written by: Michiko Yokote
- Music by: Masaya Koike (4-EVER); Shun Okazaki (4-EVER)
- Studio: Arms
- Licensed by: NA: AnimeWorks
- Original network: CTC, TV Saitama, TV Aichi, tvk, Sun TV, Kids Station
- Original run: October 10, 2007 – December 26, 2007
- Episodes: 12
Further information
Novel
Genshiken: Return of the Otaku (Shōsetsu Genshiken Hairu Ranto no Yabō ~Return of the OTAKU~)
Written by	Kazutoshi Iida
Illustrated by	Shimoku Kio
Published by	Kodansha
English publisher	NA: Del Rey Books; UK: Del Rey Books
Imprint	KC Novels
Published	January 21, 2008
Anime television series
Genshiken: Second Generation
Directed by	Tsutomu Mizushima
Produced by	Haruki Hayashi; Junichirō Tsuchiya; Tooru Kawaguchi
Written by	Michiko Yokote
Music by	Shūichirō Fukuhiro
Studio	Production I.G
Licensed by	NA: NIS America
Original network	Tokyo MX
Original run	July 7, 2013 – September 29, 2013
Episodes	13
Related series
Kujibiki Unbalance; Kujibiki Unbalance (2006 series)
- icon

Genshiken (Japanese: げんしけん) is a Japanese manga series by Shimoku Kio. It was originally serialized in Kodansha's seinen manga magazine Monthly Afternoon from April 2002 to May 2006, and published in nine tankōbon volumes. The manga is about a college club for otaku (extremely obsessed fans of various media) and their lifestyle. The title is a shortening of the club's official name, Gendai Shikaku Bunka Kenkyūkai (現代視覚文化研究会), or "The Society for the Study of Modern Visual Culture". The series has also been adapted into an anime series directed by Tsutomu Mizushima.

A two-part short bonus story was included across both volumes of the Kujibiki Unbalance manga, published in 2006.

In December 2009, a new chapter was released in Monthly Afternoon to celebrate the release of the Genshiken 2 DVD box-set. In October 2010, the series resumed serialization as Genshiken: Second Season. The series finished serialization in August 2016, with an additional twelve tankōbon volumes published.

== Overview ==
=== Themes ===
The series focuses on the otaku lifestyle and contains numerous references to other manga, anime, video games, and other aspects of otaku culture. Common plot points include such otaku-centric activities as the buying and creation of doujinshi, fan-made manga usually of erotic content; convincing a character to try cosplay (dressing up as characters from manga, anime, or video games); the creation of plamo (plastic models that must be assembled); visiting Akihabara, Tokyo's electronics shopping district; or attending the biannual Comic Festival ("Comifes"), a reference to Comic Market ("Comiket"), Japan's single largest anime and manga-focused fan convention.

Since the anime is co-produced by Sega Sammy Holdings, the Guilty Gear video game series is heavily referenced, with actual gameplay sequences being shown multiple times, Ohno cosplaying as Kuradoberi Jam, and other minor references. The Sega puzzle game Puyo Puyo (Note: The series Puyo Pop is known as Puyo Puyo in Japan. Also, the specific game played is different for each medium: in the manga, it is Puyo Puyo 2, and in the anime, it is Puyo Puyo Fever.) also serves as an important plot point as Kasukabe tries to gain Kousaka's attention. Numerous other non-Sega/Sammy properties are also referenced throughout the anime, but their names are changed slightly, such as The King of Fighters '95 being alluded to as COF 95 and Capcom vs SNK 2 as "S-Cup". Discussion of eroge, erotic video games usually of the visual novel genre, also occurs often.

Similar to the treatment of video games in the series, popular anime, and manga are often alluded to by pseudonyms, such as "Gungal" (Gundam), "Reass Mood" (Code Geass), "Haregan" (Fullmetal Alchemist), "Scram Dunk" (Slam Dunk), "Neko Yasha" (InuYasha), and many others. Genshiken usually avoids referring to these series so in-depth that it would require the use of names and lines from their real-world counterparts, with several notable exceptions: in the model-building chapter of the manga (but not the anime), actual Gundam mecha and characters are referred to throughout, while the dialogue quoted by Sue (except for one "Neko Yasha!" outburst) is pulled directly from Evangelion, Lupin III, Azumanga Daioh, and other series.

These cultural references have remained intact for the English adaption of the manga, which includes a section for translation notes. However, due to the number of allusions made and the inability of a translator to always know what is being referred to, many explanations of otaku references are still absent. The anime, however, has been criticized for having "excessive script variances" with its English dub translations, such as injecting English-specific references like "talk to the hand" and for inconsistently including liner notes.

=== Ramen Angel Pretty Menma ===
Ogiue and Ohno cosplaying Pretty Menma and Cutie Tonko, main heroines of "Ramen Angel Pretty Menma"

Another fictitious series created for the series is Ramen Angel Pretty Menma, a generic adult visual novel. Mentioned in passing as Sasahara's first such game in the manga, it is given much greater emphasis in the second TV series. The plot revolves around Kaoru Torigara, the only son of a ramen shop owner, who is going to renovate his inherited ramen shop. He discovers that his shop has a guardian angel named Pretty Menma. Pretty Menma tells Kaoru that his dead father's intention is making him succeed in the "Food King Wars", a battle of restaurants around the world that is held every 4 years. Kaoru and Menma must help each other to go through the struggles of the "Food King Wars". In the anime, there is also Ramen Angel Pretty Menma 2, which continues from the first version. Additionally, the third version of the opening sequence (that uses the same song, but adds scenes and edits existing ones) shows Ogiue cosplaying Pretty Menma, Ohno cosplaying Cutie Tonko (another heroine in this series who represents tonkotsu, a form of ramen broth), and Kasukabe cosplaying Menma's mother. This series is also spun off into its own Internet radio show, manga (serialized in Monthly Comic Alive) and a drama CD.

=== Plot ===
Genshiken follows the lives of a group of college students drawn together by their shared hobbies, and the trials and adventures associated with being otaku. The story begins with the introduction of Kanji Sasahara, a shy, confidence-lacking freshman who on club day at university, decides to join a club he would actually enjoy, Genshiken. Over his four years at Shiiou University, Sasahara comes to accept himself for who he is and loses the inhibitions and guilt he once felt and associated with otaku culture, becoming an enthusiastic club member, and for a time, a capable club president. As the story of Genshiken progresses, focus is also placed on Saki Kasukabe, a determined non-otaku who initially struggles to drag her boyfriend Kousaka out of the club, and Chika Ogiue, a self-professed otaku-hater who feels a deep-seated shame and self-loathing toward her own interests and hobbies.

During the course of the series, the reader bears witness as the group grows in its cohesiveness over time, and bonds form between the characters as they begin to see themselves as more than fellow club members, but friends as well. In this context, club activities such as group outings, the biannual pilgrimage to Comifes, and even simply hanging out in the club room, allow the characters' complex relationships to grow into friendship, infatuation, and at times, even love. While a few of them never quite see eye-to-eye about their interests or the lives they lead, they are held together by the bonds of friendship that they share.

==== Second generation ====
After Sasahara, Kousaka and Kasukabe graduate, the series shifts focus to three new club members: The self-conscious Yajima, the energetic-yet-annoying Yoshitake, and Hato, a fudanshi who cross-dresses to fit in better and go unrecognized by his normal classmates. Emphasis is also put on the character of Madarame, a former president of the club who actually graduated a year before Sasahara, but remained in the club due to working and having an apartment nearby, hanging out in the club room in his time off as he struggles to grow up and move on from university.

== Media ==
=== Manga ===
Written and illustrated by Shimoku Kio, Genshiken was serialized in Kodansha's seinen manga magazine Monthly Afternoon from April 25, 2002, (Note: Debuted in the magazine's June 2002 issue.) to May 25, 2006, (Note: Finished in the magazine's July 2006 issue.) and published in nine tankōbon volumes between December 2002 and December 2006. The English version, translated by David Ury, was released by Del Rey Manga between April 2005 and November 2007, and republished in three omnibus volumes by Kodansha USA between May 2012 and January 2013.

A sequel series, titled Genshiken: Second Season (げんしけん二代目, Genshiken Nidaime), was serialized in Monthly Afternoon from October 25, 2010, to August 25, 2016, and reprinted in twelve tankōbon volumes released between May 2011 and November 2016. The English version was released by Kodansha USA between September 2012 and March 2018.

=== Anime ===
The manga was brought to television by the production company Genco through animation studio Palm in 2004 as a 12-episode anime and in 2006 and 2007 as 3-episode OVA, adapting the first five volumes of the manga. The TV series was licensed for North American release by Media Blasters.

The anime adaptation is very faithful to the original work, with few revisions being made, with the exception that many references to specific anime, manga, and video games are changed or removed. The previously fictional Kujibiki Unbalance manga series was also turned into an anime series to match the medium, with three complete episodes being created for sampling in the anime version of Genshiken. The three Kujibiki Unbalance episodes are provided as bonus OVAs with the purchase of the Genshiken DVDs.

It was originally announced by Media Factory at Comiket 69 that the second TV series of Genshiken would premiere in October 2006. However, Media Factory clarified their statement in May 2006, saying that the series airing in the fall would be a full-fledged Kujibiki Unbalance series, rather than a Genshiken sequel. Nevertheless, the DVD releases of the new Kujibiki Unbalance series each included an OVA episode of Genshiken, for a total of three new episodes. The first new episode was released with Kujibiki Unbalance DVD Box 1 on December 22, 2006, with the two subsequent installments following on February 23 and April 25, 2007, respectively.

On April 23, 2007, it was announced on the Genshiken homepage that a second anime television series would be produced, including the character Ogiue, who had been introduced in the OVA episodes. The first episode of the second series aired on October 10, 2007, on Japanese TV. A radio webcast ran simultaneously with the terrestrial broadcast. The final episode of the series aired on December 26, 2007; however, it did not conclude the story.

The TV version of Genshiken 2 aired with minor censorship. The censorship was that of a highly erotic kiss that involved no nudity. Additional nudity like breast nipples and strong cleavage was also censored. The DVD version shows everything uncensored.

In the March 2013 issue of Monthly Afternoon, it was announced that a new anime had been authorized for Genshiken: Second Season. The new anime sequel is directed by Tsutomu Mizushima at Production I.G, with Michiko Yokote handling the series composition. The series premiered on July 7, 2013, and includes the opening song "Genshi, Joshi wa, Taiyo Datta" by Sumire Uesaka and the band Kabuki Rocks. At Anime Expo 2013, NIS America announced their acquisition of Genshiken: Second Season, licensed under the title Genshiken: Second Generation, for release in North America.

A Genshiken: Second Generation OAD (Original Animation DVD) was bundled with the limited edition of the 15th volume of the Genshiken manga, released on December 20, 2013. The story is set between the events of the Genshiken 2 and Genshiken: Second Generation series.

=== Drama CDs ===
There has been three drama CDs bundled together with different media in the series. The first one was released as a "first press" item for the 9th volume of the manga, while the two others were included in the two first volumes of the Genshiken 2 DVDs.

List of releases:

1. Genshiken Dai 9 kan: Tokusōban Drama CD (げんしけん 第9巻 特装版 ドラマCD)
2. Dai 8.5 wa: "Otaku Shigan... Mitai na?" (第8.5話「オタク志願…みたいな?」)
3. Bangai hen "Road to Ikebukuro (kari)"

=== Light novel ===
Kodansha released the light novel Genshiken: Return of the Otaku (小説 げんしけん 拝入蘭人の野望 〜Return of the OTAKU〜, Shoron Genshiken: Hairu Ranto no Yabou; Genshiken Novel: Ambitions of Ranto Hairu) on January 23, 2008, with Del Rey releasing the book in April 2010. The book introduces the character of Ranto Hairu, the rich grandson of one of Japan's most influential businessmen, as he takes over the student club organization with the intention of getting rid of any elements he views as unsavory. Meanwhile, a supernatural force is slowly abducting members of Genshiken without a trace.

Chronologically the book falls just after certain events in the second volume, although few of the book's events follow the story elements already established in the series. Changes such as Kuchiki remaining with the Genshiken after his initial attempts to join, the established president of the student club organization drops out due to pregnancy, as well as Ohno and Tanaka's relationship being more established than it was during this point in time. The light novel also introduces several characters who are only present in the novel itself and do not appear in the anime or manga. Also of note is that there are several elements present in the book (such as the supernatural) that are not present in the anime or manga.

== Reception ==
In this panel from the second chapter, Sasahara visits Kousaka's room for the first time. Kio Shimoku has been praised for his attention to background detail.

Genshiken has been praised for its execution of the slice-of-life genre, in that it is able to be funny while still maintaining a strong sense of everyday life. Anime News Network reviewer Bamboo Dong's review of the first manga volume called Genshiken "one of the best manga series out this year", praising Shimoku Kio's attention to detail and David Ury's translation work. Genshiken was also selected as one of the Manga Division Jury Recommended Works in the 2005 Japan Media Arts Festival.

David Smith at IGN said "If you haven't seen Genshiken, you're missing out on the definitive anime portrait of contemporary anime fandom." He also recommended fans of the series to check out Otaku no Video as well.

== See also ==
- Comic Party
- Cosplay Complex
