= List of Gall Force characters =

This is a list of fictional characters from the Japanese science fiction anime OVA metaseries Gall Force.

== Eternal Story characters ==
Rabby (ラビィ, Rabii)
Voiced by: Naoko Matsui (Japanese); Kerry O'Malley (English)
The main character of the First Story Arc and next in line after Eluza in the chain of command. Rabby is loyal to her shipmates above all other things. It is that loyalty which causes her to spare the first example of the "third race", due to it looking so much like Patty. When she finally understands the way her shipmates have been used and discarded, her disillusionment causes her to make a choice which determines the fate of all intelligent life. Her Rhea/Earth Chapter reincarnation, Sandy Newman, is still the central character, driven by a desire to make up for her father's role in creating the MME.
Eluza/Elza (エルザ, Eruza)
Voiced by: Maria Kawamura (Japanese); Lisa Ortiz (English)
The eldest and highest ranking of the major characters. With the captain of the Star Leaf crew in a meeting on the fleet flagship, Eluza is the next highest officer and second in command when the Paranoids attack the fleet. Her will is very strong and it is her inflexibility which leads to her final fate. Her Rhea/Earth Chapter reincarnation, Fortin, demonstrates a similar difficulty in letting go of old enmities, even when the alternative is death.
Patty (パティ, Pati)
Voiced by: Eriko Hara (Japanese); P. R. Wellington (English)
Rabby's best friend. A follower, not a leader, Patty's distinguishing characteristic is her tendency to go into trance-like moments of distraction. This trait may be related to why she does not reject the experiment the way Eluza did. Her Rhea/Earth Chapter reincarnation is Melody, who expresses several foreshadowed elements in Eternal Story.
Rumy/Rammy (ラミィ, Ramii)
Voiced by: Yuriko Yamamoto (Japanese); Kayzie Rogers (English)
The youngest of the shipmates, she is the least capable and hardened of the soldiers and fills in the anime mascot cliché role. Rabby acts as a big sister to her, scolding and shielding her, and she dislikes Lufy. Like Rabby and Patty, she plays a direct, pivotal role for all intelligent life in the saga.
Lufy/Rufy (ルフィー, Rufii)
Voiced by: Hiromi Tsuru (Japanese); Teresa Campbell (Eternal Story), India McDonald (Destruction & Stardust War) (English)
Technically not even a member of the Star Leaf crew, Lufy crash-lands in a crippled Branch-class fighter just before the Star Leaf jumps into hyperspace. She is a cocky ace fighter pilot who pretends not to take dangerous situations seriously and does not follow orders very well, though she is loyal to her friends no matter what the cost to herself. Lufy has a less than favorable reputation for being the sole survivor from her flight groups, a fact which troubles her deeply. She becomes one of the main character in Destruction and Stardust War. Her Rhea/Earth Chapter reincarnation Score has the same reckless daring, although she seems somewhat calmer in this incarnation.
Pony (ポニー, Ponii)
Voiced by: Michie Tomizawa (Japanese); Lisa Ortiz (English)
The shy and easily frightened computer expert of the crew, Pony gets along much better with artificial intelligences than she does with any of the organic crew members. Her closest friends are Catty and the ship's computer, OX-11. She plays a direct role in Rabby's decisions later on in the story.
Catty (キャティ, Kyati)
Voiced by: Naoko Watanabe (Japanese); Kerry O'Malley (Eternal Story), Rachael Lillis (Destruction & Stardust War) (English)
A soft-seeming and idealistic crew member, she is really a Gynoid (android) copy created by the Solnoid intelligence chief, Catty Nebulart, to monitor the development of the "third race", i.e. the Terrans. She is determined to see the plan come to fruition, and is the only character to survive from the Solnoid-Paranoid War into the human age.
The Boy
Voiced by: Hidehiro Kikuchi (Japanese); Jim Malone (English)
Originally an embryonic weapon used by the Paranoids, it eventually inseminated inside Patty, which was the first phase before she was completely merged with the Paranoid factor and become a new lifeform. However, Rabby and Toil-2 extract this embryo out of her through Trans-Mat. The embryo quickly grows in front of Rumy and Toil-2, becoming into what is essentially a full-grown baby. Although Rabby initially wants to kill him due to her belief of him being a sort of Paranoid weapon, she relents after Patty's begging as well as the Boy's saving of Rumy from falling back into the lake. Afterwards, the Paranoid and Solnoid fleets arrive, attempting to recover both Patty and the Boy due to the Species Unification Plan. After Rabby learns the truth about the Plan, she and Patty decide to make a suicide run against the remaining Solnoid forces, while they send Rumy and the Boy to Terra. He is also Patty's son and in essence the sole male Solnoid. Except for certain parts of the anatomy, he looks just like his mother.
Dorn
Voiced by: Yusaku Yara (Japanese); Bal Shem Tov (English)
Also spelled as Dohn and Dawn, he is the commander of the Paranoid Axis forces who are trying to implement the Species Unification Project (or Project Exodermus). He seems to be fully resolute in his duty.

== Destruction and Stardust War characters ==
Shildy (シルディ, Shirudi)
Voiced by: Waka Kanda (Japanese); Ami Shukla (English)
Shildy is the resolute and composed leader of the new Gall Force crew Lufy is taken into following her reanimation, and the main character in Destruction and Stardust War. Unlike Star Leaf's crew, Shildy and her friends are familiar with the plan for the creation of a third race, meaning that Catty must have at some time confided in her. She also shares the dream of achieving peace for both races.
Spea (スピア, Supea)
Voiced by: Yuko Mizutani (Japanese); Jessica Calvello (English)
Shildy's best friend and confidant. She's particularly loyal to Shildy, going so far as to threaten others of death if they ever get in her way, and also seems to admire and hold Shildy in particularly high esteem.
Amy (アミィ, Amii)
Voiced by: Chieko Honda (Japanese); Roxanne Beck (English)
The new Gall Force crew's junior mascot, much the same way as Rumy for the previous crew. Amy is very shy and insecure, though she can handle herself in a fight if necessary.
Catty Nebulart (キャティ・ネビュラート, Kyati Nebyuraato)
Voiced by: Naoko Watanabe (Japanese); Rachael Lillis (English)
The Gynoid (android) Catty's biological template (though more advanced in age) and chief of Solnoid Intelligence, she is also the instigator of the plan to genetically unite the Solnoids and Paranoids. She is a pacifist at heart and even in the midst of war seeks a way to give both races yet a chance to live in harmony with each other.
Journey (ジャーニー, Jaanii)
Voiced by: Rihoko Yoshida (Japanese); Carol Jacobanis (English)
Supreme leader of the Solnoids, she leads the war against the Paranoids. She's obsessed with victory and will stop at nothing to wipe out all of the Paranoids. Her flagship is the Traverser, and she manifests herself in a sort of holographic display pod.
Born (ボーン, Boon)
Voiced by: Yusaku Yara (Japanese); Tom Wayland (English)
Also spelled as Bohn, he's the supreme leader of the Paranoids and leads the war against the Solnoids. Being Journey's opposite equivalent, he's not as maddened as her, although he too seeks total victory at all costs.

== Rhea/ Earth Chapter characters ==
Sandy Newman (サンディ)
Voiced by: Naoko Matsui (Japanese); Debora Rabbai (English)
The main character of Rhea and Earth Chapter, and reincarnation of Rabby. Being the daughter of Dr. Grey Newman, the discoverer of the ruins on the Moon, she feels responsible for the destruction caused by the MME. A gentle woman by nature, the struggle for survival has hardened her. Rather than give in to cynicism, Sandy chooses to stick with her idealism. She fights with firm resolve and by the beginning of the story has risen to the level of a minor officer in the resistance movement. It is her destiny to show the leader of the MME the truth.
Dr. Grey Newman
Voiced by: Ikuya Sawaki (Japanese); Christopher Graham (English)
Father of Sandy and the creator of the MME. He led the research team that discovered the alien technology (the wrecked Solnoid base ship from Eternal Story) on the moon. After the discovery, he urged the nations to only use the new-found technology for peaceful purposes, but in the rush to war he was ignored.
Melody (メロディ)
Voiced by: Eriko Hara (Japanese); Veronica Taylor (English)
Sandy's best friend, and the reincarnation of Patty. A gentle soul despite her soldier status, she became embittered of the MME after her love interest, Bohdy, was killed by them in the pilot episode.
Fortin (フォルティン)
Voiced by: Maria Kawamura (Japanese); Veronica Taylor (English)
Eluza's reincarnation is a sergeant in the Eastern Forces resistance movement who has become hardened during the war. After losing her family in the human fighting before the rise of the MME, she became cynical and isolated, unable to trust (or emotionally tie herself to) other people. However, after meeting Sandy she soon relaxes and learns to open herself again.
Mitty (ミティ)
Voiced by: Chieko Honda (Japanese); Veronica Taylor (English)
A vagabond and the reincarnation of Rumy's younger version who searched the remains of the destroyed cities for food. After encountering Sandy's band, she joined the resistance fighters. Mitty is young, but full of optimism and tough enough to keep up with everyone and survive. Her knowledge of the sewer systems in some areas are very essential to Sandy's group.
Score
Voiced by: Hiromi Tsuru (Japanese); Vibe Jones (English)
An informal, laid-back person but a capable Eastern Forces soldier, and Lufy's reincarnation. After meeting Sandy, she perceives her as a natural leader and decides to fight alongside her group. Despite being sarcastic at times, she fights alongside Sandy right to the very end and never lets her friends down.
Sally (サリー)
Voiced by: Michie Tomizawa (Japanese); Tara Jayne (English)
Pony's reincarnation is the leader of a pacifistic sect named Geo Chris dedicated to replant the Earth following the conclusion of the war. To this purpose, Geo Chris has nurtured a tree within an abandoned missile silo base, collecting its seeds for their self-appointed task. When the MME destroy the tree, Sally joins Sandy's band of resistance fighters in the final battle as a medic.
Lamidia McKenzie (ラミディア)
Voiced by: Yuriko Yamamoto (Japanese); Lynna Dunham (English)
Lamidia, the reincarnation of Rumy's older version, is a major in the Mars U.N. armed forces and the daughter of the garrison commander. She urges the general to send reinforcements to assist the resistance fighters on Earth. When she learns of the military conspiracy to destroy the Earth, she takes her subordinates and hijacks a spaceship to stand in the Hecatoncheir’s way. In the final battle, she succeeds in persuading the leaders on Mars to hold back their orbital bombardment and allow the resistance the time they need to remove the MME.
Varji (バージィー)
Voiced by: Chika Kanda (Japanese); Ami Shukla (English)
Varji is the captain of the Hecatoncheir, a massive plasma weapon-equipped spaceship sent from Mars, and Shildy's reincarnation. Unlike Shildy, she is firm to her duties to the point where she is willing to sacrifice the resistance fighters on Australia, although like Shildy, she firmly believes this to be necessary for humanity's survival. When the Hecatoncheir is destroyed, she lands on Earth and joins the resistance with her crew, although with reservations.
Ann
Voiced by: Yuko Mizutani (Japanese); Jessica Calvello (English)
Spea's reincarnation, and an officer and pilot under Varji's command on the Hecatoncheir.
Bower/Bauer (バウアー)
Voiced by: Kazuhiko Inoue (Japanese); James Wolfe (English)
A tank unit commander who is Sandy's love interest and most steadfast ally in the Western Forces.
Norton (ノートン)
Voiced by: Yūsaku Yara (Japanese); Gregory Wolfe (English)
A cyborg, and one of the few survivors of his kind following the rise of the MME. Originally a sergeant and the commanding/supervising officer of a Western MME unit in the war between East and West.
G.O.R.N.
Voiced by: Masaharu Satou (Japanese); Mark Knight (English)
Arguably the "reincarnation" of Born, he truly resembles his Paranoid predecessors, and is bent on the complete annihilation of all mankind in the Solar System. He's the overmind leader of the MME. However, his obsessive hatred against humanity doesn't stop him from making wise decisions for the sake of the MME's survival.

== New Era Characters ==
Crys (クリス)
Voiced by: Chisa Yokoyama (Japanese); Jorjeana Genchur (English)
Rabby and Sandy's reincarnation, she works in the archives of the city, and is clumsy albeit hardworking and highly intelligent. She is prone to breaking transit laws. She is one of the six women chosen by Catty with the new rise of G.O.R.N.
Marble (マーブル)
Voiced by: Akiko Hiramatsu (Japanese); Carol Jacobanis (English)
Pony and Sally's reincarnation in New Era.
Garnet (ガーネット)
Voiced by: Yuri Amano (Japanese); Lisa Ortiz (English)
Eluza/Elza and Fortin's reincarnation, she works with the city government and was tasked with finding a solution to the city's overpopulation problems. After her plan is rejected, she gets caught in G.O.R.N.'s new rise, as she is chosen by Catty.
Dia (ダイヤ)
Voiced by: Hiroko Tonekura and Kaoru Shimamura (Japanese); India McDonald (English)
Lufy's and Score's reincarnation, she is a pilot of the forces stationed in the Moon. Whether by chance or by Catty's design, she is caught in G.O.R.N.'s rise when missiles are launched from the Moon towards Mars, forcing military command to send crewed fighters to intercept them. She is forced to join the rest of the new Gall Force after her squad is wiped out.
Pearl (パール)
Voiced by: Yuri Shiratori (Japanese); Eileen Stevens (English)
Ramy, Lamidia and Mitty's reincarnation in New Era. She lives with her parents and works at the archives like Crys. She is one of the women chosen by Catty in preparation for G.O.R.N.'s rise.
Ruby (ルビィ)
Voiced by: Miki Ishioka (Japanese); Rebecca Honig (English)
Patty and Melody's reincarnation, she seems to be interested in dating men. Caught during G.O.R.N.'s rise, it is later discovered she is part-Yuman, causing distrust among the rest of the new Gall Force, particularly Dia.
Catty (キャティ)
Voiced by: Naoko Watanabe (Japanese); Rachael Lillis (English)
Unlike her former version, Catty is a Yuman who seems to have all the knowledge of the previous Catty androids. For one reason or another, she decided to select the reincarnations of the first Gall Force, in anticipation for G.O.R.N., and made an elaborate plan to allow these girls to escape from G.O.R.N.'s sphere of influence. However, many events throughout New Era seal her fate.
Nova (ノバ)
Voiced by: Nozomu Sasaki (Japanese); Michael Sinterniklaas (English)
The main, or at least, the "physical", antagonist in New Era, he is one of the few remaining pure-blood Yumans, a new race of powerful humans. Like his predecessor, Genova, he seeks freedom for all Yumans and the subjugation of humanity. To these ends, he seeks to use G.O.R.N. (to whom he refers as "supreme leader") as well as fellow Yumans in the city as his mains allies/tools in his struggle against humanity. However, G.O.R.N. proves to be much more than he bargained for, sealing his fate (as well as that of all Yumans and humans alike).

== Revolution Characters ==
In Gall Force: Revolution, the Solnoids are reimagined not as the predecessors of mankind (as in the previous series), but as their descendants who had left Earth for space after it became uninhabitable. Since the beginning of the Solnoid war, the Solnoid high command chose to clone females for their armies because egg cells are easier to use for cloning reproduction than sperm. Male embryos, so-called "Retrogues" (a fusion of "retro" and "rogue"), are usually eliminated upon their detection in the cloning vats.

=== East Force Army ===
Rabby (ラビィ)
Voiced by: Kotono Mitsuishi
This version of Rabby is more easy-going than her Artmic incarnation, although Lufy does manage to rouse her ire now and then. She serves as the Star Leaf's combat drone control officer.
Eluza (エルザ)
Voiced by: Kikuko Inoue
The captain of the Star Leaf, and one of Pfizer's many lovers. After she realizes that Pfizer only loves herself and is willing to readily sacrifice her own people for victory, Eluza deserts the battlefield just before Pfizer's attack against the West Force can eradicate her ship along with the rest of the fleet, marking the start of her crew's rebellion.
Patty (パティ)
Voiced by: Tomo Sakurai
The ship weapons control officer aboard the Star Leaf. Her occasional absentmindedness, as seen with her Artmic version in Eternal Story, is attributed here to a brainwashing process which forces her to obey the orders of the Solnoid Elite Guard; it is under this influence that she unwittingly betrays Conch to Shoot and the Elite Guard.
Rumy (ラミィ)
Voiced by: Chisa Yokoyama
Like her Artmic version, she is the youngest, least experienced and most easily flustered member of the Star Leaf crew. She is in charge of the Star Leaf's defense systems.

=== West Force Army ===
Lufy (ルフィ)
Voiced by: Fumie Kusachi
The only West Force soldier in the main cast, Lufy is as hotheaded and confrontational as her Artmic version, and also possesses the same sense of loyalty. After she is shot down by Rabbi during their first encounter (the first and only time she was ever defeated in battle), she considers Rabby her rival and at first tries to even the score between them, but later grudgingly ends up supporting her and the other Star Leaf crew members against Pfizer's machinations. Due to her combat skills, she is nicknamed "shishigami" ("Death God") by her fellow Solnoids. She has the habit of pompously referring to herself as "ore-sama" ("my fabulous self"). Her general appearance is based on Score, Lufy's reincarnation in the Earth Chapter series.

=== Conch ===
Conch is a Solnoid organization which is outlawed due to their anti-war sentiments. The members of Conch are pacifists and try to end the war by reminding their fellow Solnoids that war is just destructive. Hidden inside a disguised asteroid ship, they have been raising Retrogues (see above) and preparing for the day the Solnoids can finally return to their old home in peace.

Catty Nebulart (キャティ)
Voiced by: Moe Nagasaki
The de facto leader of Conch. Just like her Artmic version, Catty is an android constructed based on a Solnoid template, namely the engineer who constructed the antimatter gun Pfizer has been trying to find and which secretly serves as Conch's base. She also dies in an explosion, sacrificing herself to save her crew and her new friends from the Star Leaf from a bomb planted by Shoot.
Pony (ポニー)
Voiced by: Kyoko Hikami
A close friend of Catty, and her second in command. Unlike her Artmic original, she has white skin and blonde hair.

=== Antagonists ===
Commander Pfizer (ファイザー)
Voiced by: Ai Orikasa
Ostensibly just the high commander of the Solnoid East Force, she is the actual driving force behind the Solnoid civil war. Sadistic and obsessed with destruction, she perpetuates the war only to satisfy her own twisted needs.
Shoot (シュート)
Voiced by: Michiko Neya
The commander of the Solnoid Elite Guard, and another of Pfizer's lovers. As ruthless and crazed as her commander, she also revels in death and destruction and is therefore one of Pfizer's most loyal followers. She employs an electro-whip as her personal weapon of choice.
