= The Burning Wild Man =

Japanese manga series

- Cover of the first volume

燃える! お兄さん (Moeru! Onii-san)
- Genre: Comedy
- Manga
- Written by: Tadashi Satō
- Published by: Shueisha
- Imprint: Jump Comics
- Magazine: Weekly Shōnen Jump
- Original run: 1987 – 1991
- Volumes: 19
- Anime television series
- Directed by: Osamu Kobayashi
- Produced by: Toru Horikoshi (NTV); Hideo Kawano (Toho); Reiko Fukakusa (Studio Pierrot)
- Written by: Kenji Terada
- Music by: Kōji Makaino
- Studio: Studio Pierrot
- Original network: NNS (NTV)
- Original run: March 14, 1988 – September 19, 1988
- Episodes: 24
- Original video animation
- Studio: Studio Pierrot
- Released: July 1, 1989 – August 2, 1989
- Runtime: 35 minutes
- Episodes: 2

The Burning Wild Man (Japanese: 燃える! お兄さん, Hepburn: Moeru! Onii-san; lit. 'Burning Older Brother') is a Japanese manga series written and illustrated by Tadashi Satō. It was serialized in Shueisha's shōnen manga magazine Weekly Shōnen Jump from 1987 to 1991, with its chapters collected in 19 tankōbon volumes. It was later adapted into an anime series by Studio Pierrot. The 24-episode series aired on Nippon Television from March 1988 to September 1988.

Kenichi Kokuho (国宝ケンイチ, Kokuhō Ken'ichi) became lost in the mountains as a small child. A foster father raised Kenichi; when Kenichi was 15 the foster father told Kenichi about his background and the teenager returned to the civilized world at age 15.

== Characters ==
=== Kokuhō Family ===
Kenichi Kokuhō (国宝 憲一, Kokuhou Kenichi) Voiced by: Kazuki Yao
a.k.a. Onii-san (お兄さん, big brother). The main character and a practitioner of Cha Genmai Style Karate.
Yukie Kokuhō (国宝 雪絵, Kokuhou Yukie) Voiced by: Chieko Honda
Kenichi's little sister who often acts as his straight man.
Kenkichi Kokuhō (国宝 憲吉, Kokuhou Kenkichi) Voiced by: Kenichi Ogata
a.k.a. Tou-chan (father). The head of the Kokuhō family and a potted plant artisan.
Kenji Kokuhō (国宝 憲二, Kokuhou Kenji) Voiced by: Yōko Matsuoka
Kenichi's little brother.
Kaede (かえで) Voiced by: Megumi Hayashibara
The young girl who lived as Kenichi's sister in the mountains.
Cha Genmai (玄米 茶, Genmai Cha) Voiced by: Fumio Matsuoka
The old man who found and raised Kenichi and taught him karate.
Flipper (フリッパー) Voiced by: Ikuya Sawaki
Kenichi's wolf companion from the mountains. He becomes the Kokuhō family pet. His face looks more like a cat face.

=== Classmates ===
Gai Hidō (火堂 害, Hidou Gai) Voiced by: Shūichi Ikeda
A school delinquent and third generation yakuza of the Hidou Boryokudan Group. He is always depicted with his mouth open in an evil smile. He likes Yukie.
Sayuri Ayanokouji (綾小路 さゆり, Ayanokouji Sayuri) Voiced by: Yuriko Yamamoto
Yukie's best friend.
Rocky Hada (ロッキー羽田) Voiced by: Yūsaku Yara
A half-Japanese and half-Filipino boy who is highly influenced by American culture and is always wearing flashy outfits.
Tarō Anausu (穴薄 太郎, Anausu Tarou) Voiced by: Ikuya Sawaki
Jirō Kaisetsu (貝節 次郎, Kaisetsu Jirou) Voiced by: Shinya Ōtaki
Akira Shiranui (不知火 明, Shiranui Akira) Voiced by: Show Hayami
A pompous student who presents himself as chivalrous and tries to impress girls.
Sandy Uper (サンディ・ウーパー) Voiced by: Michie Tomizawa
An American transfer student who is very fascinated by Japanese culture.

=== Teachers ===
Ayako Osanai (小山内 文子, Osanai Ayako) Voiced by: Naoko Matsui
Ekkusu Suparutan (酢張丹 悦楠, Suparutan Ekkusu; pun on Spartan X) Voiced by: Kōichi Yamadera

=== Animals ===
Duck Nicholson (ダック・ニコルソン) Voiced by: Kōichi Yamadera
a.k.a. Duck-kun (ダックくん).

=== Others ===
Narrator Voiced by: Hideyuki Tanaka

== Video game ==
In 1989, Toho released an action video game adaptation of the anime for the Famicom, developed by the Advance Communication Company. The game starred Kenichi as the main character, while featuring Hidou, Rocky, and Shiranui as playable characters in some levels. The goal of the game is to rescue Yukie from a dragon simply named Dra Gon.

The game was re-branded with a circus theme and released in North America under the name Circus Caper, also published by Toho. The RPG element with the final boss was removed, the stages and bosses are in different order, and many graphical and musical changes were made to better resemble a circus theme.
