= Gall Force =

Japanese OVA series and their franchise

- Metaseries logo

ガルフォース
- Genre: Adventure, science fiction
- Created by: Hideki Kakinuma
- Anime film

Eternal Story
- Directed by: Katsuhito Akiyama
- Produced by: Tooru Miura; Mitsuhisa Hida; Nagateru Katō; Ikuo Nagasaki
- Written by: Sukehiro Tomita
- Music by: Ichizō Seo
- Studio: Artmic; AIC
- Licensed by: NA: Central Park Media
- Released: July 26, 1986
- Runtime: 86 minutes
- Anime film

Gall Force 2: Destruction
- Directed by: Katsuhito Akiyama
- Produced by: Masaki Sawanobori; Yasuhisa Kazama; Nagateru Katō
- Written by: Hideki Kakinuma
- Music by: Ichizō Seo
- Studio: Artmic; AIC
- Licensed by: NA: Central Park Media
- Released: November 21, 1987
- Runtime: 48 minutes
- Original video animation

Ten Little Gall Force
- Directed by: Katsuhito Akiyama
- Produced by: Satoshi Koizumi
- Written by: Hideki Kakinuma
- Music by: Ichizō Seo
- Studio: Artmic; AIC
- Licensed by: NA: AnimEigo
- Released: July 3, 1988
- Runtime: 25 minutes
- Anime film

Gall Force 3: Stardust War
- Directed by: Katsuhito Akiyama
- Produced by: Masaki Sawanobori; Yasuhisa Kazama; Nagateru Katō
- Written by: Hideki Kakinuma
- Music by: Ichizō Seo
- Studio: Artmic; AIC
- Licensed by: NA: Central Park Media
- Released: November 2, 1988
- Runtime: 62 minutes
- Anime film

Rhea Gall Force
- Directed by: Katsuhito Akiyama
- Produced by: Masaki Sawanobori; Yasuhisa Kazama; Nagateru Katō
- Written by: Hideki Kakinuma
- Music by: Etsuko Yamakawa
- Studio: AIC
- Licensed by: NA: Central Park Media
- Released: March 21, 1989
- Runtime: 59 minutes
- Original video animation

Earth Chapter
- Directed by: Katsuhito Akiyama
- Produced by: Satoshi Koizumi; Kinya Watanabe; Tooru Miura
- Written by: Yoichi Tomioka (#1); Hideki Kakinuma (#2–3)
- Music by: Takumi Kawai (Note: Credited under the pseudonym "Haward Killy.") (#1); Kaoru Mizutani
- Studio: AIC; Studio 88
- Licensed by: NA: Central Park Media
- Released: December 25, 1989 – December 1, 1990
- Runtime: 48–54 minutes (each)
- Episodes: 3
- Original video animation

New Era
- Directed by: Katsuhito Akiyama
- Produced by: Tooru Miura; Satoshi Koizumi; Jin Maeda; Shōji Kumabe (#1); Tateo Haraya (#2)
- Written by: Hideki Kakinuma
- Music by: Takehito Nakazawa
- Studio: AIC; Studio 88
- Licensed by: NA: Central Park Media; UK: Manga Entertainment
- Released: December 1, 1991 – February 26, 1992
- Runtime: 44–46 minutes (each)
- Episodes: 2
- Original video animation

The Revolution
- Directed by: Hiroyuki Fukushima; Akihiko Nishiyama (#3); Shinya Hanai (#4)
- Produced by: Nagateru Katō; Yumiko Masujima; Kōji Yoritsune
- Written by: Hideki Kakinuma
- Music by: Michiru Ōshima
- Studio: Artland
- Released: October 2, 1996 – March 21, 1997
- Runtime: 28 minutes (each)
- Episodes: 4
- icon

Gall Force (ガルフォース, Garu Fōsu) is a metaseries of science fiction anime OVAs by the studios Artmic and AIC, with production by Youmex. The original character designs were by Kenichi Sonoda, though these were dropped for the Gall Force: The Revolution remake. Central Park Media licensed most of the films and OVAs with the exceptions of Ten Little Gall Force, Scramble Wars, and The Revolution.

== Background ==
=== Star Front Gall Force ===
This was the origin and precursor to the Gall Force franchise. Originally appearing in the monthly Model Graphix magazine in Japan as a 3D photo novel using detailed models, this later set the stage for the animated films. Rabby, Patty, and Rumy were the only main Solnoid characters featured, and they were equipped with different uniforms, weapons, and vehicles than those shown in the regular Gall Force OVAs. Although it was the first-ever storyline to the Gall Force mythos proper, Star Front's place in the official continuity has been questioned and disregarded due to contradictions between it and Eternal Story. Although it is the actual origin of the franchise, it is now seen by fans as non-canon, or an alternate timeline. Another factor that causes question is the fact that fans outside Japan never knew of the photo novel's existence.

== Story ==
The original timeline for the Gall Force series consist of four story arcs: First Story Arc, Rhea Arc, Earth Chapter Arc and New Era Arc. Within each arc there are several episodes, with the exception of Rhea.

=== Original trilogy ===
The first arc starts with the centuries-long war between the Paranoids and the Solnoids, the exodus of early humanity to planet Terra, and the death of the Star Leaf crew. The timeline ends with events that will lead to the Rhea Arc. The first story arc consists of three episodes;

Gall Force: Eternal Story

In the distant past, two advanced civilizations, the amoeba-like Paranoids and the all-female Solnoids, are waging a war that has gone on for many centuries. When the Solnoid fleet leaves a battle to defend an experimentally terraformed world from the Paranoids, one damaged Solnoid ship is separated from the fleet. This ship is a Kularis-class cruiser named the Star Leaf. Aboard the ship are only seven women: Eluza; the highest ranking officer on board, second-in-command Rabby, Pilot Lufy, Officers Catty, Pony, & Patty, and Ensign Rumy. After narrowly escaping a battle, the Star Leaf crew decides to continue with their orders and rendezvous at planet Chaos to defend it. However, their ship is the subject of an experiment, a plan which was secretly hatched by the leaders of both races which came into fruition during the battle, and the unsuspecting crew of seven Solnoid soldiers aboard the ship is caught up in the middle. The Star Leaf crew must now defend the artificial paradise of Chaos from the Paranoid fleet and foil the plans of the Solnoid leaders.

Gall Force: Eternal Story cast
Role	Japanese	English
Role	Japanese	TAJ Productions (1996)
Rabby	Naoko Matsui	Kerry O'Malley
Elza	Maria Kawamura	Eluza
Elza	Maria Kawamura	Lisa Ortiz
Rummy	Yuriko Yamamoto	Rumy
Rummy	Yuriko Yamamoto	Katherine Freeman
Patty	Eriko Hara	P.R. Wellington
Catty	Naoko Watanabe	Kerry O'Malley
Pony	Michie Tomizawa	Lisa Ortiz
Lufy	Hiromi Tsuru	Teresa Campbell
TOIL	Tomiko Suzuki	Eric Stuart
AIL	Kyouko Hamura	Eric Stuart
OX-11	Toshio Furukawa	Eric Stuart
Exanon	Kei Tomiyama	James Carter Cathcart
The Boy	Hidehiro Kikuchi	Jim Malone
Commander Dorn	Yuusaku Yara	Baal Shem Tov
Paranoid Adjutants	Michitaka Kobayashi Shin'ya Ootaki	Daniel Cronin
Akon Kaguya Captain	Yoshino Ootori	P.R. Wellington
Central Guard Captain	Kazuko Yanaga	Kerry O'Malley
Solnoid Bridge Crew	Arisa Andou Seiko Nakano	Molly Schaff

In 1985 a previous English dub for Gall Force: Eternal Story was released by Intervision Video with an unknown cast. This dub was later included as bonus feature on Central Park Media's DVD release.

Gall Force 2: Destruction

Ten years later, one of the two survivors of the Star Leaf, Lufy, is recovered from space by Solnoid forces. There, she is confronted with the secret plan which had become reality in the previous episode: to genetically unite both races, codenamed the "Species Unification Plan". Wracked by self-doubt, Lufy is forced to make a decision as Solnoids and Paranoids face each other in battle in the very planetary system in which the new life form and the last Star Leaf survivor have established an existence—and the Solnoid army, who are unaware of the plan, intend to deploy a System Destroyer to wipe out the enemy once and for all.

Gall Force 2: Destruction cast
Role	Japanese	English
Role	Japanese	TripWire Productions (2003)
Shildy	Waka Kanda	Ami Shukla
Lufy	Hiromi Tsuru	India McDonald
Catty	Naoko Watanabe	Rachael Lillis
Spea	Yuuko Mizutani	Jessica Calvello
Amy	Chieko Honda	Roxanne Beck
Journey	Rihoko Yoshida	Carol Jacobanis
Born	Yuusaku Yara	Tom Wayland
Adrienne	Eiko Yamada	Amanda Goodman
Solnoid Commanders	Chiyoko Kawashima Rumiko Ukai	
Paranoid Captain	Masaharu Satou	
Paranoid Commanders	Michitaka Kobayashi Shou Hayami	
Lorelei Commanders	Miki Itou Urara Takano	

Additional voices
Version	Actor	Notes
English	Claire Samuels	
English	David Hair	
English	Lynna Lewis	as Lynna Dunham
English	Robin Custeau	
English	Timothy Breese Miller	

Gall Force 3: Stardust War

The destruction of the new future for Terra is averted, but Lufy and her friends find themselves in another twist: in a desolate planetary system named Sigma Narse, the Solnoids and Paranoids intend to finish the war by fighting to the last by using their Planet Destroyers—which will result in the destruction of both sides, leaving them nothing but stardust in its wake (hence the title "Stardust War"). An encounter with the Solnoid instigator of the secret plan convinces the crew to try and walk a different path: To attempt to convince both sides to stop the senseless fighting by reminding them what they have already lost...

Gall Force 3: Stardust War cast
Role	Japanese	English
Role	Japanese	TripWire Productions (2003)
Shildy	Mayumi Shou	Ami Shukla
Lufy	Hiromi Tsuru	India McDonald
Catty	Naoko Watanabe	Rachael Lillis
Spea	Yuuko Mizutani	Jessica Calvello
Amy	Chieko Honda	Roxanne Beck
Catty Nebulart	Minako Arakawa	Rachael Lillis
Journey	Rihoko Yoshida	Carol Jacobanis
Born	Yuusaku Yara	Tom Wayland
Elision	Michihiro Ikemizu	Timothy Breese Miller
Rummy	Yuriko Yamamoto	Rumy
Sardin Captain	Eiko Yamada	
Solnoid Commanders	Chiyoko Kawashima Rumiko Ukai	
Solnoid Soldiers	Miki Itou Tomoko Maruo	
Paranoid Commander	Michitaka Kobayashi	

Additional voices
Version	Actor	Notes
English	Amanda Goodman	
English	Claire Samuels	
English	David Hair	
English	Lynna Lewis	as Lynna Dunham
English	Robin Custeau	

=== Rhea Arc ===

Rhea Gall Force takes place in the aftermath of the Stardust War, but before the events of Earth Chapter. In the 21st century the Earthen discovery of derelict alien technology on the Moon—which is in fact the remnants of the events in Eternal Story—ignited an arms race as the "Western" and "Eastern" blocs rushed to deploy the technology as weapons, including a form of artificial life based on the Paranoids, the MME. This artificial life turned on humanity, starting a war of extermination against their creators.

Rhea Gall Force plot summary

In the year 2084, scientist Grey Newman found and reverse-engineered the technology from a Solnoid ship found on the Moon (see Eternal Story) and unintentionally brought about the end of civilization. World War III breaks out and in the middle of battle, the human's own alien synthezoids turn against their creators, nearly annihilating humankind.

Later in the year 2085, the remaining humans are on the run from the machines who are terminating them. In order to survive to defeat the alien machines, the human race must leave Earth, and go to Mars. Among these voyagers is one woman who bears the burden of guilt for her father's contribution to the destruction of civilization.

Rhea Gall Force cast
Role	Japanese	English
Role	Japanese	Matlin Recording (2003)
Narrator	Naoko Watanabe	Debora Rabbai
Sandy Newman	Naoko Matsui	Debora Rabbai
Score	Hiromi Tsuru	Shannon Conley
Melody	Eriko Hara	Kathleen McInerney
Bauer	Kazuhiko Inoue	James Wolfe
Mitty	Chieko Honda	Kathleen McInerney
Norton	Yuusaku Yara	Gregory Wolfe
Fortin	Maria Kawamura	Kathleen McInerney
Dominov	Ichirou Nagai	Keith Howard
Nelson	Seizou Katou	Mark Knight
Vikal	Masashi Hironaka	Rik Nagel
Bohdy	Shigeru Nakahara	Jay Snyder
Gorn	Masaru Satou	Mark Knight
Gorn's adjutant	Kouji Totani	
Grey Newman	Ikuya Sawaki	Christopher Graham
Rivolk	Katsumi Suzuki	
Soldier	Michitaka Kobayashi	

=== Earth Chapter ===
The Earth Chapter Arc continues the story from Rhea Arc with reincarnations of the Star Leaf crew. After the completion of Operation Exodus, the Earth resistance must survive long enough for the arrival of the Mars reinforcements led by General McKenzie. It consists of three episodes.

Earth Chapter 1

In the year 2085, the Earth is now a wasteland ruled by war machines that won an apocalyptic war. Shortly after that battle, mankind left and began new life on Mars. However, Sandy Newman and her comrades are left on Earth. While struggling to survive, the group locates an abandoned nuclear missile launch site. There they must contend with a quasi-religious group called Geo Chris which plans to make the Earth green once more. However to defeat the war machines of the enemy known as the MME, the Earth resistance must use the nuclear missiles to attack the MME's citadel, but doing so would carry a heavy price.

Earth Chapter 2

On Mars, the viability of the final stages of Operation Exodus is debated, with the Martian military preferring a plan to use a Plasma cannon based on ancient Solnoid technology to destroy the MME citadel and end the war in one strike. The displaced Earth resistance members of Operation Exodus and their allies in the Mars military disobey orders and take a ship to Earth. On Earth, GORN, the leader of the MME, captures Sandy Newman in order to obtain access to Earth's orbital weapons, which it plans to use to prevent the Martian assault. Sandy Newman and GORN must work together to prevent the Mars forces from destroying the Earth's chance of survival.

Earth Chapter 3

The crew of the Martian vessels sent to Earth in Chapter 2 fight alongside the Earth resistance in the final battles of the war with the MME. The main Mars forces have finally arrived as well, and their combined forces finally allow an assault on the MME's Citadel. The war will soon come to an end as Sandy comes face-to-face with GORN, but in doing so the truth behind the entire conflict is revealed.

=== New Era ===
New Era concludes the story from Earth Chapter, but takes place about 200 years later. It consists of two episodes.

New Era Plot Summary

After centuries of war between humans and the MME machines, the humans have won the battle. However, many lives were lost and the Earth was rendered terribly damaged and unstable to live on. Shortly afterwards, mankind began to restore Earth, and a new race of cyborgs called "Yumans" had begun to live with the humans. In desire for a better future, humanity is now linked in one large computer network. However, a conflict between the Humans and Yumans shortly began. Considering themselves far better than the humans, the Yumans began to plot a takeover. Now humanity lives separated into tightly packed arcologies built around the world, each keeping minimal contact with the other and dealing with internal problems like overpopulation.

A young scientist named Nova, influenced by revolutionary leader of the Yumans, Genova, develops his own plans to bring humanity down. Using the tools he has acquired over the years, he awakens artificial intelligence to destroy all human life, by reprogramming every computer on Earth with the GORN virus. The virus is actually a bit more than Nova predicted, due to its intent on wiping out both humans and Yumans from the solar system. With the entire system now connected once more after all the wars, GORN is able to bring his presence everywhere in his attempt to achieve his long-term goals.

GORN's plans are not a surprise to Catty, for she has foreseen the disaster and sets her own plan into motion just before the virus strikes. Being a Yuman with heart, she leads a force of seven women into the final battle between man and machine.

Gall Force: New Era cast
Role		Japanese	English	
Role		Japanese	CTV Sound Studios (1997)	Matlin Recording (2004)
Chrys		Chisa Yokoyama	Toni Barry	Jorjeana Marie
Pearl		Yuri Shiratori	Elly Fairman	Eileen Stevens
Marble		Akiko Hiramatsu	Laurel Lefkow	Carol Jacobanis
Ruby		Miki Ishioka	Vivienne Rochester	Rebecca Honig
Garnet		Yuri Amano	Tamsin Hollo	Lisa Ortiz
Diamond		Kaoru Shimamura	DeNica Fairman	India McDonald
Nova Universe		Nozomu Sasaki	Daniel Marinker	Michael Sinterniklaas
Catty		Naoko Watanabe	Sarah Wateridge	Rachael Lillis
GORN		Masaharu Satou	Peter Marinker	Mark Knight
1	Committee leader	Hiroshi Itou		Mark Knight
1	Peacekeeping director	Hajime Koseki		Vinnie Penna
1	Mayor	Kousei Yagi	Garrick Hagon	Jay Snyder

Additional voices
Version	Actor	Episodes	Notes
Japanese	Ayako Shiraishi	1	
Japanese	Jun'ichi Kanemaru	1	
Japanese	Kiyoyuki Yanada	1	
Japanese	Sanae Miyuki	1	
Japanese	Satoko Kitou	1	
Japanese	Shin'ichirou Miki	1	
Japanese	Toshiharu Sakurai	1	
English: CTV Sound Studios	Brendan Charleson	1	
English: CTV Sound Studios	Daniel Marinker	1, 2	
English: CTV Sound Studios	DeNica Fairman	1, 2	
English: CTV Sound Studios	Dillwyn Owen	2	
English: CTV Sound Studios	Elizabeth Pearce	1	
English: CTV Sound Studios	Elly Fairman	1, 2	
English: CTV Sound Studios	Garrick Hagon	1	
English: CTV Sound Studios	Jonathan Keeble	1	
English: CTV Sound Studios	Laurel Lefkow	1, 2	
English: CTV Sound Studios	Peter Marinker	1, 2	
English: CTV Sound Studios	Robert Chase	1	
English: CTV Sound Studios	Sarah Wateridge	1, 2	
English: CTV Sound Studios	Siân Rivers	1	
English: CTV Sound Studios	Stewart Bradley	1	
English: CTV Sound Studios	Tamsin Hollo	1, 2	
English: CTV Sound Studios	Toni Barry	1, 2	
English: CTV Sound Studios	Vivienne Rochester	1, 2	
English: Matlin Recording	Don Puglisi	1, 2	as Joey Rappaporte
English: Matlin Recording	Jamie McGonnigal	1, 2	
English: Matlin Recording	Jay Snyder	1, 2	
English: Matlin Recording	Josh Mosby	1, 2	
English: Matlin Recording	Keith Howard	1, 2	as Kurt Riddle
English: Matlin Recording	Tara Sands	1, 2	
English: Matlin Recording	Vinnie Penna	1, 2	

== Alternate series and releases ==
=== Gall Force: The Revolution ===
This 1996 OVA was a reimagining of the series, which replaced the amorphous Paranoids with a seemingly endless civil war between the "West Force" and "East Force" Solnoid armies. Unlike the previous OVAs' more somber and apocalyptic tones, The Revolution is a more traditional sci-fi adventure story, although it still stresses on the tragedies and wide-scale destruction caused by war. Four episodes were produced, along with one soundtrack album and a "vocal collection" starring the main female cast singing various songs, one of which being a "remake" of Disguised Spies from one of the original saga's soundtracks.

The plot tells of the struggle between the West Force and East Force armies of the Solnoids, which threatens to escalate into total destruction of the Solnoid race as both sides search for the ultimate war weapon, the anti-matter gun. By happenstance, however, several troopers from the East Force (Eluza, Rabby, Patty, and Rumy) and the West Force (Lufy) encounter the Conch, an outlawed Solnoid anti-war organization which is trying to spread peace among the hostile parties. As they discover that the war is merely used as an insidious instrument of balance by one singular Solnoid party, the rogue Solnoid troopers unwittingly find themselves fighting for an idea completely alien to them, but which presents the only way of stopping this perpetuated madness.

=== Ten Little Gall Force & Scramble Wars ===
The 1988 omake Ten Little Gall Force (テンリトルガルフォース, Ten Ritoru Garu Fōsu) was an animated mockumentary detailing a behind-the-scenes look at the production of Gall Force: Eternal Story and Destruction from the First Story Arc. Characters were drawn as super deformed versions of their Eternal Story counterparts. This video maintained a comedic tone as opposed to the somewhat serious war story in the original video it was supposedly documenting.

Scramble Wars (スクランブル・ウォーズ 突走れ!ゲノムトロフィーラリー, Sukuranburu Uōzu Tsuppashire! Genom Torofī Rarī) (released 1992) is a humorous Japanese take on Wacky Races in which characters from several major series produced by Artmic—Bubblegum Crisis, Gall Force, Genesis Survivor Gaiarth, among others—compete for a trillion dollar-heavy trophy sponsored by the megacorporation Genom. The amount of this prize brings out the worst of many of the main characters, and even weapons of mass destruction are brought to bear against the competition.

Ten Little Gall Force was released along with Scramble Wars in the United States by AnimEigo on a single VHS video titled Super-Deformed Double Feature. Strangely, as of this time, these have not been released on DVD as with the other Gall Force titles and are (in their VHS release) much-sought rare collector's items.

Ten Little Gall Force cast
Role	Japanese
Amy	Chieko Honda
Catty	Naoko Watanabe
Elza	Maria Kawamura
Lufy	Hiromi Tsuru
Patty	Eriko Hara
Pony	Michie Tomizawa
Rabby	Naoko Matsui
Rummy	Yuriko Yamamoto
Shildy	Waka Kanda
Spea	Yuuko Mizutani
Commander Dorn	Kouichi Yamadera
Hideki Kakinuma	Naoki Tatsuta
Katsuhito Akiyama	Shin'ya Ootaki
Ken'ichi Sonoda	Kouichi Yamadera
Manager Koizumi	Yoku Shioya
OX-11	Kouichi Yamadera
The Boy	Hidehiro Kikuchi

Scramble Wars cast
Role	Japanese
Narrator	Kiyoyuki Yanada
Sylia Stingray	Yoshiko Sakakibara
Priss Asagiri	Ryouko Tachikawa
Linna Yamazaki	Michie Tomizawa
Nene Romanova	Akiko Hiramatsu
Mackie Stingray	Nozomu Sasaki
Elza	Maria Kawamura
Rabby	Naoko Matsui
Rummy	Yuriko Yamamoto
Lufy	Hiromi Tsuru
Patty	Eriko Hara
Catty	Naoko Watanabe
Mitty	Chieko Honda
Ital Del Labard	Daiki Nakamura
Sahari	Noriko Hidaka
Zaxon	Akio Ootsuka
Randis R. Khaizard	Shunsuke Shima
Quincy Rosenkreutz	Kiyoshi Kawakubo
Gorn	Masaharu Satou
Boomie	Hideyuki Umezu

=== Novels ===
==== Space Chapter ====
Gall Force 1〈Red Devil Samba〉

Gall Force 2〈Blue Angel Rock〉

Gall Force 3〈White Fairy Waltz〉

Gall Force 4〈Black Demon Fugue〉

Gall Force 5〈Green Saint Aria〉

==== Earth Chapter ====
Rhea Gall Force〈Exodus〉

Gall Force Earth Chapter 1〈Project Atlantis〉

Gall Force Earth Chapter 2〈Tree of Resurrection〉

Gall Force Earth Chapter 3〈Outpost〉

Gall Force Earth Chapter 4〈The Longest Day〉

== Video games ==
A shoot 'em up was released in Japan, simply titled Gall Force, for the Family Computer Disk System by HAL Laboratory on November 19, 1986. Another shoot-em-up, also developed by Hal, was released during the same year titled Gall Force: Defense of Chaos for the MSX, which was followed by Gall Force: Eternal Story, a graphic adventure game for the MSX2, in 1987.

== Music ==
Similarly to other OVAs of the era (and by studios AIC and ARTMIC), Gall Force features a huge amount of music, performed by the voice actors involved in the series. Several soundtracks were released for each film and OVA (and for each OVA episode in Earth Chapter's case). In addition, many music collections were released, featuring original songs performed by the aforementioned voice actors, along with various singles and a CD drama. So far, no soundtracks have been released for the films Destruction and Stardust War.

Soundtracks

- Gall Force Eternal Story Original Animation Soundtrack
- Rhea Gall Force Original Soundtrack
- Gall Force Earth Chapter 1 Original Soundtrack
- Gall Force Earth Chapter 2 Original Soundtrack
- Gall Force Earth Chapter 3 Original Soundtrack
- Gall Force New Era Original Soundtrack
- Gall Force The Revolution Original Soundtrack

Singles

- Good Feeling
- Heiki ga Sore Yurusanai
- Stardust Memory
- Dream Again
- NEVER END ~Don't Say Goodbye~
- GALL FORCE - Sugao no Spy-tachi

Music Collections

- Gall Force Eternal Band
- Gall Force Earth Saga - Lady's Song of Gall Force
- Gall Force Memorial Songs
- Gall Force The Revolution Vocal Album

Gall Force Earth Saga - Back to the School Wars

- A CD drama released during the Earth Saga OVAs' runtime, Back to the School Wars features alternate versions of the characters of the Rhea/Earth Chapter arc, placed in a high school setting while retaining most of their personality and abilities.

== Reception ==
The Encyclopedia of Science Fiction described Gall Force: Eternal Story as a surprisingly good anime given its origins as a spin-off of a model-kit photo-comic, particularly praising its animation as above average for the period. However, it criticized the film's generally bland characterization, noting that despite its unusual all-female action cast, the characters were largely one-dimensional, with greater emphasis placed on their attractive designs than their personalities and occasional fan service. The encyclopedia also identified the influence of Alien (1979) on the film's middle section, but found that it lacked the original's tension. It considered the conclusion, which draws on the familiar shaggy God story tradition, well executed despite its predictability, arguing that its impact was further weakened by an earlier clue to the ending.
