= Yuriko Yamamoto =

Japanese actress, singer, and narrator (born 1960)

- 山本 百合子
- Born: Yuriko Yamamoto (山本ユリ子); February 13, 1960 (age 66); Hino, Tokyo, Japan
- Occupations: Actress; voice actress; singer; narrator
- Years active: 1976–present
- Agent: Aoni Production
- Spouse: 1
- Website: Official profile

Yuriko Yamamoto (山本 百合子, Yamamoto Yuriko; born February 13, 1960) is a Japanese actress, voice actress, singer and narrator from Hino, Tokyo, affiliated with Aoni Production.

Her debut role was as the titular character in Hello! Sandybell in 1981. She has voiced many major roles in 1980s series such as Minerva in Transformers: Super-God Masterforce and 1990s anime such as Fight! Iczer One, Gall Force, Saint Seiya, Magical Taruruto-kun, and RG Veda.

== Biography ==
Ever since she was a child, Yamamoto loved swimming. She went to a swimming school and joined the swim club during junior high school. At first she did crawl, but started breaststroke once starting junior high, becoming her favorite. She was just a regular kid, though stood out a little in junior high when chosen to be a school representative for swimming.

She had aspired to be a singer since her childhood, and during her junior high school years, she even won a radio talent show five weeks in a row.

=== Career ===
Yamamoto debuted in the entertainment industry as a singer before she transitioned to television dramas.

In 1980, she established her first connection with the anime industry by performing the insert songs "Kono Hoshi no Ue de" and "Ai wa Maboroshi" for the anime film Cyborg 009: Legend of the Super Galaxy. She switched to voice acting in 1981, starring in Hello! Sandybell as the titular character.

Although the exact timing of her transfer from the Roppongi Office to Aoni Production remains unknown, she shifted focus entirely to voice acting after 1983.

=== Current activity ===
In recent years, like other female voice actresses of her generation, she has focused primarily on narration. Although her roles in animation have decreased, she voices Clara (from Heidi, Girl of the Alps) in Oshiete! Try-san television commercials for Try Home Tutor, taking over the role from Rihoko Yoshida who retired from voice acting.

== Filmography ==
=== Television animation ===
List of voice performances in television animation
| Year | Series | Role | Notes | Source |
|---|---|---|---|---|
| 1981 | Hello! Sandybell | Sandybell | Debut anime voice role | |
| 1982 | Arcadia of My Youth | La Mime | | |
| 1983–84 | Lady Georgie! | Georgie | | |
| 1984 | Wing-Man | Morimoto Momoko | | |
| 1984 | Fist of the North Star | Yuria | | |
| 1984 | Kinnikuman {Ooabare! Seigi Choujin} | Bibimba | anime | |
| 1985–86 | Hai Step Jun | Jun Nonomiya | | |
| 1985 | Dancouga | Sara Yuki | | |
| 1985–87 | Fight! Iczer One | Iczer-1 | series | |
| 1986 | Mobile Suit Gundam ZZ | Rasara Moon, Sarasa Moon | | |
| 1986 | Gou Q Chouji Ikkiman | Katorine | | |
| 1986–88 | Gall Force | Rumy | First chapter arc | |
| 1986–89 | Saint Seiya | Eagle Marin, Seika | | |
| 1987 | Hana no Asuka-gumi! | Yokko | | |
| 1987 | Crystal Triangle | Miyabi | | |
| 1988 | Fight! Ramenman | Lania | | |
| 1988 | The Burning Wild Man | Sayuri Ayanokouji | | |
| 1988 | Kiteretsu Daihyakka | Miyoko Nonohana | | |
| 1988–98 | Transformers: Super-God Masterforce | Minerva | | |
| 1988–97 | Legend of the Galactic Heroes | Evangeline Mittermeyer | | |
| 1988 | Let's Go! Anpanman | Ringo-chan, Enpitsu-bouya | First voice of Enpitsu-bouya | |
| 1989 | Earthian | Takako | | |
| 1989 | Sally the Witch | Sally Yumeno | 1989 series | |
| 1989–90 | Gall Force Earth Chapter | Lamidia McKenzie | Earth Chapter arc | |
| 1989 | Karura Mau | Maiko Ougi | anime | |
| 1989 | Yajikita Gakuen Dōchūki | Yajima Junko (Yaji-san) | anime | |
| 1990–92 | Magical Taruruto-kun | Ria Kinakamo | | |
| 1991–92 | RG Veda | Soma | | |
| 1991–92 | Tomoe ga Yuku | Tomoe Oujima | anime | |
| 1993 | Ghost Sweeper Mikami | Reika Ryuuzaki | Ep. 20 | |
| 1995 | Sailor Moon | Lilica Hubert | Supers Special 3 | |
| 1995 | Galaxy Fraulein Yuna | Elnar | | |
| 2001 | Pokémon | Maya | | |
| 2004 | Detective Conan | Kanako Hitomi | Ep. 366 | |
| 2005 | Air | Minagi's mother | | |
| 2006 | Angel Heart | Tomomi Asakura | | |
| 2007 | Dancouga Nova | Vladmir | | |
| 2012 | Chibi Maruko-chan | Kyouko | | |
| 2012 | Great Detective Conan | Hatsune Kamon | Eps 667-668 | |
| 2016 | Witchy Pretty Cure! | The Fairy Queen | | |
| 2017 | One Piece | Vinsmoke Sora, Shinobu | | |
| | Hi-Speed Jecy | Telenne | anime | |
| | Ten no hoshi ha ryuu no kiba | ? | anime | |

=== Theatrical animation ===
List of voice performances in theatrical animation
| Year | Title | Role | Source |
|---|---|---|---|
| 1982 | Arcadia of My Youth | La Mime | |
| 1984 | Kinnikuman: Great Riot! Seigi Choujin | Bibinba | |
| 1985 | The Dagger of Kamui | Chico | |
| 1985 | Penguin's Memory: A Tale of Happiness | Child A | |
| 1986 | Fist of the North Star | Yuria | |
| 1986 | Doraemon: Nobita and the Steel Troops | Lilulu | |
| 1986 | Super Mario Bros.: The Great Mission to Rescue Princess Peach! | Kinopio | |
| 1986 | Gall Force: Eternal Story | Rumy | |
| 1988 | Tatakae!! Ramenman | La-Niang | |
| 1989 | Hengen Taima Yakō Karura Mau! Nara Onryō Emaki | Maiko Ōgi | |
| 1990 | Sally the Witch | Sally Yumeno | |
| 1991 | Magical Taruruto | Ria Kinakamo | |
| 1992 | Let's Go! Anpanman: Anpanman and His Pleasant Friends | Ringo-chan | |
| 1993 | Rokudenashi Blues 1993 | Yoko Asano | |
| 1997 | Crayon Shin-chan: Pursuit of the Balls of Darkness | Yone Higashimatsuyama | |
| 2004 | Saint Seiya: Heaven Chapter – Overture | Eagle Marin | |
| 2014 | Anpanman: Apple Boy and Everyone's Hope | Ringo-chan | |
| 2019 | City Hunter: Shinjuku Private Eyes | Kazue Natori | |

=== Original video animation (OVA) ===
List of voice performances in original video animation
| Year | Series | Role | Notes | Source |
|---|---|---|---|---|
| 1985 | Nora | Nora Scholar | | |
| 1985 | Twinkle Nora Rock Me! | Nora Scholar | | |
| 1986 | Katsugeki Shojo Tantei-dan | Yuriko Edogawa | | |
| 1986 | Twinkle Heart - Gingakei made Todokanai | Berry | | |
| 1987 | Shin Kabukicho Story Hana no Asuka-gumi! | Yokko | | |
| 1988 | Harbor Light Story: From Fashion Lala | Lala | | |
| 1989–90 | Hi-Speed Jecy | Telenne | | |
| 1990 | Hengen Taima Yakou Karura Mau | Maiko Ogi | | |
| 1991–92 | RG Veda | Soma | | |
| 1993–94 | Kishin Corps | Fujishima Yoshiko | | |

=== Drama audio recordings ===
Yamamoto has voiced in drama CDs and cassettes.

| Year | Series | Role | Notes | Source |
|---|---|---|---|---|
| | Ginga Ojousama Densetsu Yuna Galaxy Wave | Elnar | | |
| | Hi-Speed Jecy: Mobius no wana | Tere-nu | | |
| | Karura Mau! "Nara Onryou Emaki" | ? | | |
| | Kaze no Densetsu Xanadu II Heroine Tachi no Tanjoub | Pyrra | | |
| | Kishin Heidan Rei | ? | | |
| | RG Veda -Kyoujou Engoku hen- | Soma | | |
| | Sei (St) Elza Crusaders Bangaihen "LZA Debut!?" | Orikura Miho (Miho) | | |
| | Seifuu no Senki Zebuuroshia Saga | Aporonia | | |

=== Video games ===
| Year | Series | Role | Notes | Source |
|---|---|---|---|---|
| | Air | Mother | Dreamcast, PS2, PSP | |
| | Ginga Ojousama Densetsu Yuna Final Edition | Elnar | PlayStation | |
| | Himitsu Sentai Metamor V | Erika | PlayStation | |
| | Mahou no Shoujo Silky Lip | Lip | Megadrive | |
| | Mercurius Pretty End of the Century | Debora | Dreamcast | |
| | Shining Force III | Airin | Sega Saturn | |
| | Super Real Mahjong P V | Shouko | Multiple platforms | |
| | Super Robot Taisen F Kanketsuhen | ? | PlayStation | |
| | Tenshi no uta II: Datenshi no sentaku | Rianna | PC-Engine | |
| 1985 (original release) | Time Gal | Reika | Arcade, Mega-CD/Sega CD, LaserActive | |
