= Loser's Lounge =

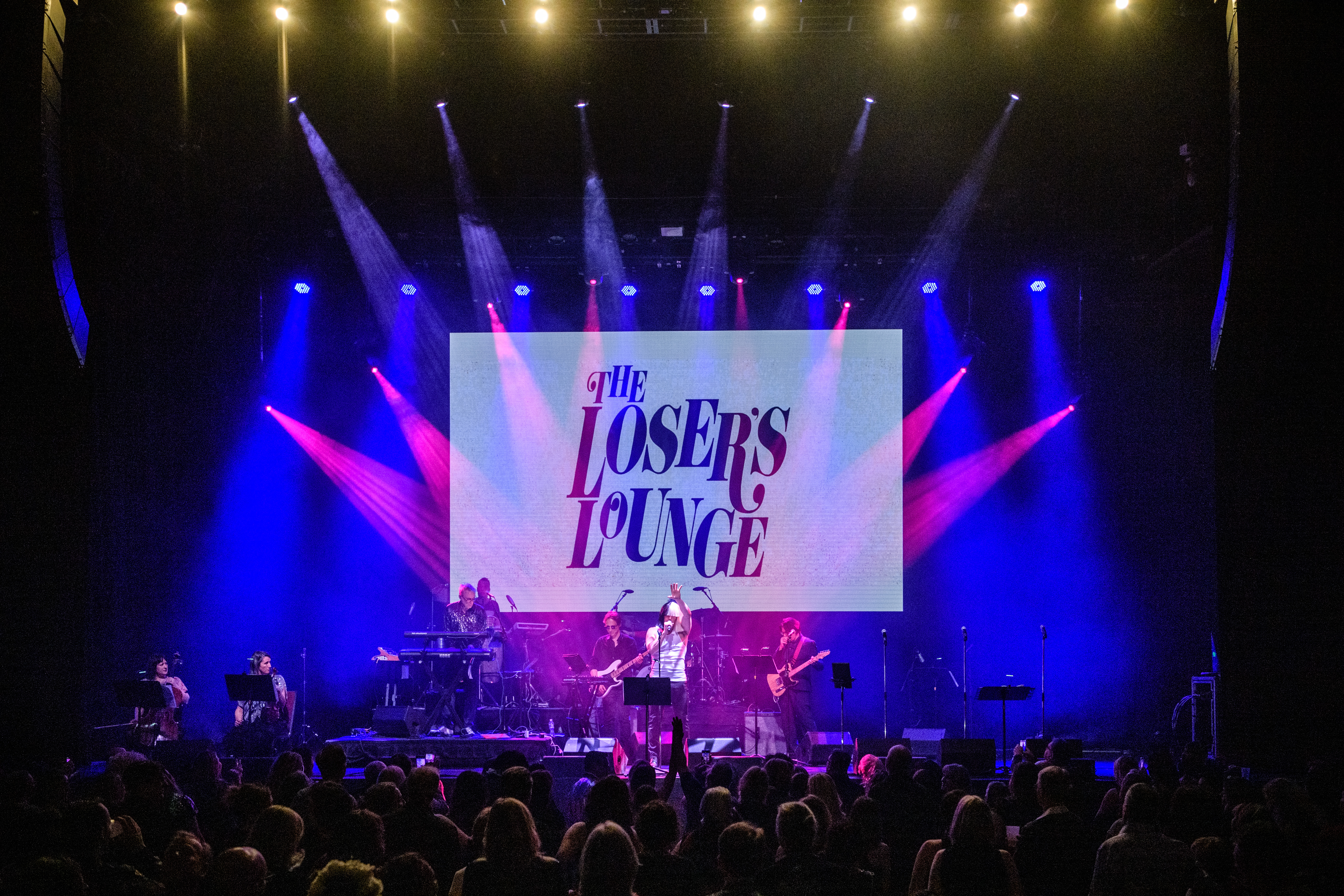
Divas Dance Party event hosted by The Loser's Lounge at the Wellmont Theater in Montclair, New Jersey.

The Loser's Lounge is an ongoing tribute project in New York City which performs music by songwriters and bands like Queen, Neil Diamond, Paul Williams, Elvis Costello, Serge Gainsbourg, The Beach Boys, Lee Hazlewood, Paul McCartney, XTC, and David Bowie. Each show explores greater- and lesser-known works by a single artist, or pits two musical forces against one another (for example, Blondie vs. The Pretenders, or The Smiths vs. The Cure).

The Loser's Lounge is a popular forum that brings together New York City musicians of all stripes and genres—from successful mainstream singers to underground or experimental artists. Artists who have performed at Loser's Lounge shows include Paul Williams, J Mascis, Sean Altman, John Flansburgh, April March, Ronnie Spector, Debbie Harry, Alice Cohen, Richard Barone, J. G. Thirlwell, Brian Dewan, Carol Jacobanis, and Cyndi Lauper.

== History ==
The original revue was created in 1993 and performed by Joe McGinty (former keyboardist for the Psychedelic Furs and session musician for bands like The Ramones) with the performer Nick Danger and the singer/songwriter Andrea Egert. Its first performances were at the Pink Pony, on Ludlow Street on the Lower East Side of New York City. Later performances at Fez under Time Cafe were backed by guitarist David Terhune's The Kustard Kings, members of which — including Terhune, guitarist Julian Maile, drummer Clem Waldmen, percussionist Eddie Zweiback, and bassist Jeremy Chatzky — continue to perform as regulars for the Loser's Lounge with McGinty and regular back-up singers Connie Petruk, Tricia Scotti, Sean Altman, and Katia Floreska.

For many years Fez under Time Cafe was home to regular Loser's Lounge performances. The Fez closed as a venue in April, 2005, and since the revue has continued to perform bi-monthly at Joe's Pub. The Loser's Lounge has additionally appeared at several large rooms in New York City, including the Allen Room at AOL Time Warner Center and the Bowery Ballroom, as well as out-of-state venues like MASS MoCA. The group has played at notable New York musical events including Midsummer Night Swing at Lincoln Center and Celebrate Brooklyn.
