= Circus Caper =

1989 video game

- North American cover art
- Developer: Advance Communication Company
- Publisher: Toho
- Producers: Junichi Tsunoda, Kazuhiko Yamamoto
- Designer: Takashi Wachi
- Programmer: Toru Nakagawa
- Artists: Yuko Morita; Marina Takase
- Composers: Michiharu Hasuya; Osamu Kasai; Masaaki Harada
- Platform: Nintendo Entertainment System
- Release: JP: August 8, 1989; NA: July 1990
- Genre: Platform
- Mode: Single-player

Circus Caper, known as Moeru! Onīsan (燃える！お兄さん; lit. 'Burn! Older Brother') in Japan, is the title of a side-scrolling Nintendo Entertainment System video game where the player controls a young boy on a quest to save his sister who has been kidnapped by the circus. The game was released in 1989 by Toho and received poor reviews.

== Plot ==
In Circus Caper, a boy named Tim takes his sister Judy to a circus show. However, the two siblings can't afford to enter. A clown offers the children tickets if they beat him in a dice game. After beating him, the clown says there is only one ticket left, so Tim lets his sister go in. After the show, Tim goes to pick up his sister, and is greeted by Mr. Magic, who has kidnapped her. Tim then enters the circus to try and rescue his sister. At the end of the game, Judy reveals to Tim that she was going to be used as a knife-throwing target, and the two go home.

In the Japanese version, based on the anime Moeru! Oniisan, Yukie has been kidnapped by Dra Gon, a dragon. It is up to Kenichi and his friends Hidou, Rocky, and Shiranui to save her. Many characters from the anime appear in the show, including Duck Nicholson, as well as the Narrator talking in the cutscenes. At the end of the game, it is revealed Dra Gon was actually Duck Nicholson in disguise.

== Gameplay ==
The single-player, side-scrolling action game takes the player through various levels, each with a circus theme, fighting various enemies and bosses until he finally defeats the ringmaster and saves his sister.

The player starts out in the game with little life, and few weapons, but he can collect various icons to increase how many direct hits that he can withstand, keys to open doors, along with various circus items to shoot as projectiles.

Many of the levels can be avoided altogether by just walking backwards and back through the curtain from where the player begins. This will take him right to that level's boss battle.

Bonus levels include guiding a bear to jump over flames, avoiding boulders in a car, using Rodan as target practice and meeting Godzilla at the circus grounds.

== Release ==
The Japanese version's title screen features the theme song from the anime, Dreamy Dreamer by Yuko Ishikawa, played in the key of B, rather than the key of D.

The USA version has a number of changes from the Japanese versions. Mainly minigame and RPG elements were removed, the stages were modified and the setting was changed to a circus. The Japanese version also features several credits screens at the end which were removed from the USA version. The soundtracks also differentiate (for the most part). In the Japanese version, instead of weapons, your character shouted quote bubbles and the stages are in a different order.
