= Dancouga – Super Beast Machine God =

Japanese anime television series

- Dancouga: Super Beast Machine God
- First Blu-ray box set cover

超獣機神ダンクーガ (Chōjū Kishin Dankūga)
- Genre: Mecha
- Anime television series
- Directed by: Seiji Okuda
- Produced by: Yoshirō Kataoka; Hiroshi Kato; Masaru Umehara
- Written by: Keisuke Fujikawa
- Music by: Osamu Totsuka; Takeshi Ike
- Studio: Ashi Productions
- Licensed by: NA: Discotek Media
- Original network: TBS
- Original run: 5 April 1985 – 27 December 1985
- Episodes: 38
- Original video animation

Requiem for Victims
- Directed by: Seiji Okuda
- Produced by: Hiroshi Katō; Masaru Umehara; Yoshiro Kataoka
- Written by: Kenji Terada; Keisuke Fujikawa; Junki Takegami
- Music by: Osamu Totsuka
- Studio: Ashi Production
- Licensed by: NA: Discotek Media
- Released: April 21, 1986
- Runtime: 90 minutes
- Original video animation

Jūsenkitai Songs
- Studio: Ashi Productions
- Released: 1986
- Original video animation

God Bless Dancouga
- Directed by: Jutaro Oba
- Written by: Hideki Sonoda
- Music by: Osamu Totsuka
- Studio: Ashi Productions
- Released: 15 April 1987
- Runtime: 80 minutes
- Original video animation

Blazing Epilogue
- Directed by: Tatsuji Yamazaki
- Produced by: Masaru Umehara
- Written by: Kenji Terada
- Music by: Takeshi Ike
- Studio: Ashi Productions
- Licensed by: NA: Discotek Media
- Released: December 1989 – May 1990
- Episodes: 4
- Manga

Dancouga BURN
- Written by: Yuichi Hasegawa
- Published by: Kadokawa Shoten
- Magazine: Monthly Shonen Ace Dash
- Original run: November 1997 – November 1998
- Volumes: 2

Dancouga: Super Beast Machine God (超獣機神ダンクーガ, Chōjū Kishin Dankūga) is a Super Robot anime television series produced by Ashi Productions, directed by Seiji Okuda and written by Keisuke Fujikawa. It ran on TBS for 38 episodes from 5 April 1985 to 27 December 1985. The TV anime was licensed by Central Park Media under their Software Sculptors label in 1995, and was released on subtitled VHS. The series's license was later picked up by Discotek Media. After the series ended, four original video animations were released between 1986 and 1990. A sequel series, Dancouga Nova – Super God Beast Armor, aired in Japan in 2007.

The series marks the debut of animator and artist Masami Ōbari, who would later become one of the most prolific mecha designers in the anime industry.

== Plot ==
Four soldiers (Shinobu Fujiwara, Sara Yuki, Masato Shikibu and Ryo Shiba) pilot the mecha Dancouga and fight to liberate portions of Earth from alien invaders known as the Muge Zorbados Empire. Dancouga is an example of the combining type of Super Robot. Unlike the traditional "component machines struggle against the monster of the week before combining and easily dispatching the monster" format, Dancouga does not combine until midway through the series and the Cyber Beast Machines were capable of effectively fighting their enemies. The mecha began as four vehicles which could transform into animals (an eagle, cougar, tiger and mammoth, respectively) and humanoid robots before combining to form Dancouga.

Many of the Dancouga story elements revolve around religion (primarily Christianity, although the series also borrows from Taoist philosophy) and music. The theme of gods is present in most episodes.

== Characters ==
Dancouga eyecatch screenshot of (left to right) Sara Yuki, Masato Shikibu, Shinobu Fujiwara and Ryō Shiba

- Shinobu Fujiwara (藤原 忍, Fujiwara Shinobu) (Voiced by: Kazuki Yao): Born in Australia to a Japanese father and an Australian mother, Shinobu was a cadet of the Australian Space Military Academy before the invasion of the Muge Empire forces. After the school closed he was transferred to the Far East's special armoured unit, the Bestial Fighter Troop or Cyber Beast Force (Jyusenki Tai). Straightforward and a talented pilot, his hobby is hang gliding.
- Sara Yuki (結城 沙羅, Yūki Sara) (Voiced by: Yuriko Yamamoto): From the Izu Peninsula, red-haired Sara Yuki was assigned to the Far East Armoured Unit a few days later than Shinobu. Balanced, civil and nurturing of children, Sara enjoys swimming and music.
- Masato Shikibu (式部 雅人, Shikibu Masato) (Voiced by: Shigeru Nakahara): Born in Iwate Prefecture to the head of an arms-manufacturing plant, Masato entered the military academy as a sixth-team trainee. He is the youngest member of the Jyusenki Tai, often providing comic relief. Masato is close friends with Laura Sullivan.
- Ryo Shiba (司馬 亮, Shiba Ryō) (Voiced by: Kaneto Shiozawa): After graduating from the military academy, Ryo practiced his kenpō. When the Jyusenki Tai was formed, General Ross Igor asked him to join the force. An orphan, Ryo is calm, sensible and spiritual.
- Shapiro Keats (シャピロ・キーツ, Shapiro Kītsu) (Voiced by: Norio Wakamoto): Shapiro was a former commander of the Australian Military Academy before defecting to the Muge Zorbados Imperial forces, where he quickly rose through the ranks to commander after being tortured. Stubborn, intelligent and manipulative, Shapiro has delusions of godhood. Sara shoots him in the back as he celebrates an early victory, killing him.
- Laura Sullivan (ローラ・サリバン, Rōra Sariban) (Voiced by: Rie Fujiwara (series), Hiroko Kasahara (God Bless)): Laura is an American from Sacramento, California whose mother was killed in an attack by the Muge forces. Found by Sara, she is adopted by Professor Hazuki. Kind, quiet and shy, Laura is close to Masato and her dog Becky.
- Ross Igor (ロス・イゴール, Rosu Igōru) (Voiced by: Masaru Ikeda): From Russia, Ross Igor is the commander of the Jyusenki Tai and father of Black Knight Alan Igor (from whom he is estranged). Apparently different strategists, General Igor's plan was roughly the same as Alan's. He dies in episode 29, "General Attack Pt II", trying to save Laura's life; it is later learned that Laura is the daughter of Alan Igor and the granddaughter of Ross.
- Professor Kotaro Hazuki (葉月 孝太郎, Hazuki Kōtarō) (Voiced by: Hiroya Ishimaru): Professor Hazuki is the resident scientist engineer, and technical genius of the Jyusenki Tai and Laura Sullivan's adoptive parent. His greatest accomplishment is the design and construction of the four mecha which form Super Robot Dancouga. After General Igor's death, Hazuki assumes command of the Jyusenki Tai and the Gandor as its captain.
- Alan Igor (アラン・イゴール, Aran Igōru) (Voiced by: Hideyuki Tanaka): Alan, son of General Ross Igor, is seen in the beginning as a nuisance than help to the Jyusenki Tai; later, they grudgingly accept his help. Also known as the Black Knight, he opposes his father and organizes his own elite corps to fight the aliens in their own milieu. Alan dies in episode 35, "Moon is Hell", during a kamikaze attack on Helmut.
- Emperor Muge Zorbados (ムゲ・ゾルバドス, Muge Zorubadosu) (Voiced by: Shūsei Nakamura): Muge Zorbados is emperor of his eponymous alien race. In the last episode, he takes a personal hand in combating the Jyusenki Tai. Apparently resembling a lion, in the last episode it is learned that he wears a mask.
- Death Gaia (デスガイヤー, Desugaiyā) (Voiced by: Yusaku Yara): General Death Gaia is the first occupation leader to invade Earth, and his first campaign is initially successful. Over time, his hold on Earth begins to slip as he misjudges the resolve of its human population and the potential of the Jyusenki Tai. Arrogant and headstrong, his only talent is brute force.
- Gildorome (ギルドローム, Girudorōmu) (Voiced by: Masaharu Satō): Gildorome is the second general of the Zorbados corps, specializing in psionics and mind control. After the defeat of Death Gaia by Dancouga, he assumes command. Proud, Gildorome's mind-control efforts are thwarted by a Gandor blast which propels Dancouga into the Muge dimension and destroys him.
- Helmut (ヘルマット, Herumattu) (Voiced by: Issei Futamata): Helmut is the third and most bloodthirsty of the generals in the Earth-occupation command. Although his actions are direct and well-thought-out, his weaknesses are impatience and brittleness. Helmut dies on the lunar surface in a kamikaze attack initiated by Alan Igor.
- Luna Rossa (ルーナ・ロッサ, Rūna Rosa) (Voiced by: Saeko Shimazu): Luna is a liaison assigned to Shapiro after he defects to the Muge. Competent in gathering intelligence, she is known to possess secret information. Attracted to Shapiro, she realizes that her love is unrequited and betrays him on the Martian auxiliary base by helping Sara find and confront him.

== Mecha ==
Each machine used to form Dancouga is capable of changing to vehicle, animal and humanoid forms. When a mecha is in open mode, a barrier appears which makes it impenetrable to enemy fire. Triggering this mode utilizes the Aggressive System, which activates automatically when the pilot reaches a certain level of anger.

- Eagle Fighter (イーグルファイター Īguru Faitā): Piloted by Shinobu Fujiwara and modified by Professor Hazuki from Shinobu's fighter, a standard model used at the Australian space military base. Quick and nimble, the Eagle Fighter forms Dancouga's head.
- Land Cougar (ランドクーガー Rando Kūgā): Special tank designed for, and piloted by, Sara Yuki. In cougar mode, the mecha can leap long distances. The Land Cougar forms Dancougar's left foot.
- Land Liger (ランドライガー Rando Raigā): Piloted by Masato Shikibu, it is similar in operation to Land Cougar but armed differently. In liger mode, the mecha can leap like Land Cougar. The Land Liger forms Dancouga's right foot.
- Big Moth (ビッグモス Biggu Mosu): Piloted by Ryo Shiba, its name is an abbreviation of "big" and "mammoth". The largest of all Jyusenki, a heavily armed tank which can transform into a mammoth. It forms Dancouga's body.
- Dancouga (ダンクーガ, Dankūga): The combined form of the first four Jyusenki Tai vehicles derives its power from the spiritual energy of all its pilots, making it greater than the sum of its parts. With a sweep of its arm, it can destroy waves of attackers. Dancouga's primary weapons are the Dankuken, a sword in its right leg, and the Daigan (a beam cannon formed from the handheld weapons of its component machines).
- Black Wing (ブラックウイング Burakku Uingu): Developed and piloted by Ross Igor's son, Alan, like the Jyusenki Tai mecha the Black Wing is transformable and has fighter and humanoid modes. Since the mecha was not developed by Professor Hazuki, it lacks the Aggressive System. It is slightly longer than the Eagle.
- Gundor (ガンドール Gandōru): A large, gray spacecraft built and commanded by Professor Hazuki, Gundor can fire a powerful energy cannon from its "mouth" (Gundor Hō 「ガンドール砲」). It transforms into a huge winged dragon, and is the new base of operations for the Jyusenki Tai after their original operations center is destroyed.
- Final Dancouga (ファイナルダンクーガ Fainaru Dankūga): The combined form of the final five Jyusenki Tai vehicles. With Black Wing as a new flight pack, Dancouga's aerial performance is greatly increased. Final Dancouga was not on the TV series or the OVAs, but it was incorporated into the Super Robot Taisen series of video games as a playable unit.

== Episodes ==
1. "Empire's Desire" (帝国の野望) (original air date 5 April 1985)
2. "Get your Jyusenki" (吠えろ!獣戦機) (original air date 12 April 1985)
3. "Reborn Shapirou!" (シャピロ!転生!!) (original air date 19 April 1985)
4. "Aimed Jamming System" (狙われたジャミング) (original air date 26 April 1985)
5. "The Man Came Last" (最後に来た男) (original air date 3 May 1985)
6. "Maiden in the Battlefield" (戦場の聖少女) (original air date 10 May 1985)
7. "A Kind of Hero" (小さな英雄) (original air date 17 May 1985)
8. "Trapped Memories" (激戦!!思い出を囮に) (original air date 24 May 1985)
9. "Hell Beast in Amazon" (アマゾン河の魔獣) (original air date 31 May 1985)
10. "Legend of Knight" (騎士の伝説) (original air date 7 June 1985)
11. "A Covering Fire of Enemy" (敵からの援護射撃) (original air date 14 June 1985)
12. "Don't Wake up Megalosaurs" (目覚めるな恐竜) (original air date 21 June 1985)
13. "Betray Town" (裏切りの町) (original air date 28 June 1985)
14. "Street Fight" (ニューヨーク市街戦) (original air date 5 July 1985)
15. "God Bless the Machine, Part 1" (獣を超え、人超え、いでよ神の戦士(前篇)) (original air date 12 July 1985)
16. "God Bless the Machine, Part 2" (獣を超え、人超え、いでよ神の戦士(後篇)) (original air date 19 July 1985)
17. "General Retire" (デスガイヤーの敗北) (original air date 26 July 1985)
18. "Temptation" (神の国への誘惑) (original air date 2 August 1985)
19. "Night Terror" (怪奇!!悪魔に消された部隊) (original air date 9 August 1985)
20. "Southern Wind" (南風ハートブレイク) (original air date 16 August 1985)
21. "The First Contact" (降りてきた死神) (original air date 23 August 1985)
22. "Time Goes Around Still" (止まった時間) (original air date 30 August 1985)
23. "Revenge for Murder" (殺人鬼への報復) (original air date 6 September 1985)
24. "La Marseille" (凱旋門燃ゆ) (original air date 13 September 1985)
25. "Trap!" (ヨーロッパ戦線の罠) (original air date 30 September 1985)
26. "The Secret of Velieves" (黒騎士の秘密) (original air date 27 September 1985)
27. "Gildorome's Decline and Fall" (妖星墜つ) (original air date 11 October 1985)
28. "General Attack, Part 1" (獣戦基地総攻撃(前篇)) (original air date 18 October 1985)
29. "General Attack, Part 2" (獣戦基地総攻撃(後篇)) (original air date 25 October 1985)
30. "We Meet Only to Part" (戦場!出会い、そして別れ) (original air date 1 November 1985)
31. "After His Death" (去りゆきし長官) (original air date 8 November 1985)
32. "Target" (空からの強敵) (original air date 15 November 1985)
33. "Capture The Intelligence" (飛べ明日へ!!将軍の子ら) (original air date 22 November 1985)
34. "Long Goodbye" (故郷に別れの歌を) (original air date 29 November 1985)
35. "Moon Is Hell" (月は地獄だ!!) (original air date 6 December 1985)
36. "Harmony Love" (野望の崩壊) (original air date 13 December 1985)
37. "Tell Laura I Love Her!" (暗黒の終焉) (original air date 20 December 1985)
38. "Darkness and Ruins" (最後の咆哮) (original air date 27 December 1985)
