= Tomoko Maruo =

Japanese voice actress (born 1966)

Tomoko Maruo (丸尾 知子, Maruo Tomoko; born June 22, 1966 in Yokohama, Kanagawa Prefecture) is a Japanese voice actress who is affiliated with Aoni Production. On December 24, 2012, she started using the stage name Chiko.

== Filmography ==
=== Television animation ===
- Dragon Ball Z (Hatch)
- Mooretsu Atarou (Atarou)
- Romeo's Blue Skies (Leo)

=== Theatrical animation ===
- Dragon Ball Z: Bojack Unbound (Zangya)
- Kimagure Orange Road: The Movie (Horikoshi)
- Mobile Suit Gundam: Char's Counterattack (Anna)
- Sailor Moon R: The Movie (Fiore as a child)

=== OVA ===
- Ariel (Nami)
- Ariel Deluxe (Yuki Nishijima)
- Birdy the Mighty (Hazumi Senkawa)
- Ellcia (Shin Shin)
- Karura Mau (Kayoko)
- Mobile Suit Gundam 0080: War in the Pocket (Chay)
- Shamanic Princess (Apoline)
- Ushio & Tora (Tatsuya)

=== Video games ===
- Dragon Ball Z: Budokai Tenkaichi 2 (Zangya)
- Art Camion: Geijutsuden (Ryoko Shiraishi)
- Team Innocent: The Point of No Return (Saki)
