= Tokyo Afterschool Summoners =

Japanese role-playing video game

- Developer: Lifewonders
- Publisher: Lifewonders
- Engine: Unity
- Platforms: Android, iOS
- Release: iOS: WW: December 2, 2016; Android: WW: December 15, 2016
- Genre: Role-playing game
- Mode: Single-player

Tokyo Afterschool Summoners (東京放課後サモナーズ, Tōkyō Hōkago Samonāzu), known also by the blend word Housamo (放サモ, derived from Tōkyō Hōkago Samonāzu), is an F2P role-playing video game for Android and iOS. It is developed by Lifewonders, a mobile gaming company operated by the dōjin circle Yojouhan-teki Seikatsu. It is noted as one of the first commercially produced LGBT video games created in Japan, and one of the first commercially produced LGBT games to extensively utilize gay manga artwork.

== Gameplay ==
Tokyo Afterschool Summoners is a free-to-play card-based role-playing video game with turn-based battles. Each character card has a weapon type, as well as an elemental attribute that determines its strengths and weaknesses against other cards in rock–paper–scissors-style match-ups. Cards gain levels and abilities by accruing experience through battles; once a card reaches its level cap, special items must be used to uncap the card so it can gain more experience. The game utilizes an affinity system wherein buffs are applied when the cards of characters who have a relationship ("love", "like", "dislike", and "rival") are used in battle together. Cards are obtained through quests, or through the game's gacha system.

== Development ==
The game was released on the App Store for iOS on December 2, 2016, and on Google Play for Android on December 15, 2016. Partial support for the game in English, Traditional Chinese, and Simplified Chinese was added in March 2018.

Several prominent gay manga artists, including RybiOK, GomTang, and naop, have designed characters for the game, making Tokyo Afterschool Summoners one of the first ever commercially produced video games to feature gay manga artwork.

== Plot ==
The protagonist awakens in a version of Tokyo where "transients" – supernatural beings from fantasy and mythology – live among humans. In this world, both humans and transients utilize mysterious artifacts to fight in duels; duelists organize into guilds, which fight for control of the 23 special wards of Tokyo. The player controls the protagonist as they form a guild of their own, gather companions, and attempt to uncover how they have arrived in this world.

== Characters ==
=== Main characters ===
Protagonist
Voiced by: Kappei Yamaguchi / Naoko Matsui / Toshiyuki Hosaka / Fuji Aki / Toshimitsu Oda
The protagonist of the game. Their name, appearance, voice, and gender identity are chosen by the player and can be changed at any time.

Lil' Salomon (サロモンくん, Salomon-kun)
Voiced by: Kappei Yamaguchi
A satyr who serves as the hero's familiar. Explains the mechanics of the game.

Shiro Motoori (本居 シロウ, Motoori Shiro)
Voiced by: Hiroki Gotō
The protagonist's class representative. Childhood friends with Kengo.

Ryota Yakushimaru (薬師丸 リョウタ, Yakushimaru Ryota)
Voiced by: Yoshihito Oomami
The protagonist and Shiro's classmate. Has a laid-back and jovial personality.

Kengo Takafushi (高伏 ケンゴ, Takafushi Kengo)
Voiced by: Yuhei Iwanaga
A childhood friend to Shiro, though their friendship has fractured due to Kengo's truancy.

Toji Sakimori (崎守 トウジ, Sakimori Toji)
Voiced by: Koji Marunaka
An apprentice kannushi and demon hunter.

=== Secondary characters ===
Tokyo Afterschool Summoners features an extensive supporting cast of over one hundred unlockable characters. A partial list of supporting characters who figure heavily into the game's plot, or who are voiced by notable seiyu, are listed below.

Aegir (エーギル)
Voiced by: Hisao Egawa
A giant transient and treasure hunter.

Ahab (エイハブ)
Voiced by: Unshō Ishizuka
An anthropomorphic water buffalo transient and whaler.

Arslan (アルスラーン)
Voiced by: Kenichi Ogata
An anthropomorphic lion transient and oil wrestler who is the guardian of the Aoyama guild.

Azazel (アザゼル)
Voiced by: Junya Inaba
An anthropomorphic goat transient and member of the Aoyma guild.

Benten (ベンテン)
Voiced by: Haruna Ikezawa
A transient high school girl and biwa player.

Choji (チョウジ)
Voiced by: Masato Yoshida
A member of the cooking club at the protagonist's school who wields the Apicius as his artifact.

Hakumen (ハクメン)
Voiced by: Yumiko Kobayashi
A kitsune transient who owns a casino in Tokyo.

Horkeu Kamui (ホロケウカムイ)
Voiced by: Masato Yoshida
An anthropomorphic Hokkaido wolf transient and member of the Ikebukuro Berserkers.

Kotaro (風間 コタロウ, Kazama Kotaro)
Voiced by: Orie Kimoto
A boy genius and ninja who is a classmate to the hero.

Lucifuge (ルキフゲ)
Voiced by: Takashi Yonezawa
A transient and executive of the Roppongi Tycoons crime syndicate.

Maria (マリア)
Voiced by: Orie Kimoto
A nun who serves as the acting master of the Aoyama guild.

Moritaka (犬塚 モリタカ, Inuzuka Moritaka)
Voiced by: Kappei Yamaguchi
An anthropomorphic dog transient and classmate to the hero.

Nyarlathotep (ニャルラトテプ)
Voiced by: Junya Inaba
An anthropomorphic hyena transient and DJ.

Ophion (オピオーン)
Voiced by: Jōji Nakata
A transient dragon and executive of the Roppongi Tycoons.

Surtr (スルト)
Voiced by: Kenta Miyake
A giant demon transient and member of the Ōtemachi Genociders.

Typhon (テュポーン)
Voiced by: Wataru Takagi
An anthropomorphic shark transient and surfer.

Zabaniya (ザバーニーヤ)
Voiced by: Hiroaki Hirata
A transient and member of the Aoyma guild who specializes in torture.

== Merchandise and Community Engagement ==
Tokyo Afterschool Summoners has developed a notable presence beyond the game itself through official merchandise and fan-oriented goods. A variety of products related to the game are made available, including apparel such as T-shirts and bags, character badges, charms, figures, tapestries, document folders, stickers, and other collectibles. These official items are sold through licensed outlets and online shops, reflecting the game’s dedicated fanbase and its expansion into physical media and branded goods. Such merchandise contributes to the game’s visibility in the mobile gaming community and provides additional engagement opportunities for players outside the digital experience.
