= Amanda Goodman =

American actress

Mandy Bonhomme
- Born: Amanda Goodman
- Occupation: Actress
- Years active: 1987–present

Amanda Goodman, also known by her former stage name Mandy Bonhomme, is an American voice and television actress who has worked on the properties of Central Park Media, Media Blasters and The Right Stuf International. Goodman studied acting in New York and is best known for voicing Juri Arisugawa and Keiko Sonoda in Revolutionary Girl Utena, as well as Komaki Asagiri in Genshiken and its spinoff Kujibiki Unbalance. She also lends her voice to video games and audiobooks. Non-anime work includes Running Man on Cartoon Network, Pup 2 No Good, The Star Maker, and the Shadowy Woman in the Nicktoons series Speed Racer: The Next Generation and Amber, one of the Solid Gold Elite Dancers in the machinima This Spartan Life. Goodman currently resides in New York City.

== Filmography ==
=== Voice roles ===
- The Star Maker - Mom
- Pup 2 No Good - Victoria, Farmer's Wife
- Running Man - Shan
- Adolescence of Utena - Juri Arisugawa
- Assemble Insert - Kagairi Sonoba, Hostess
- Ayane's High Kick - Kimiyo Tasaka, Ayane's Mom
- Boogiepop Phantom - Atsuko Abe, Rie Takai, Girl
- Comic Party - Asahi, Multi, Shiho
- Gall Force 2 - Destruction - Adrienne
- Garzey's Wing - Leelince
- Genshiken - Komaki Asagiri (Kujibiki)
- Gokudo - Additional Voices
- Gravitation - Additional Voices
- Jewel BEM Hunter Lime - Mizuki Seo
- Kare Kano - Yurika
- Knights of Ramune - Tequila
- Kujibiki Unbalance - Komaki Asagiri
- Ping Pong Club - Tachibana, Additional Voices
- Pokémon - Sue, Additional Voices
- Revolutionary Girl Utena - Juri Arisugawa, Keiko Sonoda, Shadow Girl A, Teacher
- Sins of the Sisters - Kumi
- Slayers NEXT - Mimi, Nene
- Speed Racer: The Next Generation - Shadowy Woman (Season 1)
- The World of Narue - Yuki Kashiwazaki
- This Spartan Life - Amber, Solid Gold Elite Dancers

=== Live-action roles ===
- Law & Order - Dana Flynn
- Red Butterfly - Lounge Hipster
- Westward Expansion - Abigail
- Yellow Brick Hell - Acting Student
