= Ayane's High Kick =

Anime series and its manga adaptation

- Region 1 DVD cover, featuring Sakurako Miyagawa (left) and Ayane Mitsui (right)

綾音ちゃんハイキック (Ayane-chan Hai Kikku)
- Genre: Comedy, martial arts, sports
- Original video animation
- Directed by: Takahiro Okao
- Written by: Isao Shizuya
- Music by: Nittoku Inoue
- Studio: Nikkatsu Corporation, Rikuentai
- Licensed by: NA: U.S. Manga Corps
- Released: January 21, 1997 – April 25, 1997
- Episodes: 2
- Manga
- Written by: Ihara Hiroshi
- Published by: Gakken
- Magazine: Monthly Comic Nora
- Original run: June 1997 – December 1997
- Volumes: 1

Ayane's High Kick (綾音ちゃんハイキック, Ayane-chan Hai Kikku) is a two episode anime series produced by Nikkatsu Corporation and Rikuentai. It was originally released as an original video animation (OVA) in Japan in 1997 and was licensed for release in North America by U.S. Manga Corps in 1998. It follows the story of a girl named Ayane Mitsui who wishes to become a professional wrestler, but due to a series of events, she becomes a kickboxer instead.

== Plot ==
Ayane Mitsui is a 17-year-old very athletic high school girl who wishes dearly to become a great professional wrestler like her idol Manami Toyota of the All Japan Women's Pro-Wrestling circuit. However, despite many auditions, she cannot qualify. A brilliant kickboxing coach, Kunimitsu, notices potential within the girl and persuades her to train with him. Ayane hates kickboxing and is very vocal about it, but happens to have a greater potential with the sport and sticks with it. Meanwhile, some of the less-savory teachers from her high school have become aware of her extracurricular activities and threaten to expel her if they get proof. Additionally, another kickboxer, 21-year-old Sakurako Miyagawa, has taken notice of the girl and wants to fight her in the ring.

== Media ==
Ayane's High Kick was produced by Nikkatsu Corporation and Rikuentai, directed by Takahiro Okao, and written by Isao Shizuya. Originally planned to be six parts, only two episodes of the OVA series were released in Japan on January 21 and April 25, 1997. The anime was licensed in North America by U.S. Manga Corps for VHS on April 7, 1998. The series was released on DVD for the first time on October 6, 1998. It received a second DVD release alongside another martial arts anime, Baki the Grappler, on May 28, 2002. Ayane's High Kick aired on AZN Television in August 2007. It also aired several times on AT-X in 2008. The music for Ayane's High Kick was composed by Nittoku Inoue. The anime features the opening theme "Fight for Yourself" by The Street Beats and the closing theme "Aoi Kaze no Mukou Ni" (蒼い風の向こうに; lit. 'Beyond the Blue Wind') sung by Masako Miyamura. A CD soundtrack composed of 25 songs was released by Victor Entertainment in Japan on April 23, 1997. A one-shot manga written and illustrated by Ihara Hiroshi was serialized in Gakken's Monthly Comic Nora from June to December 1997. Hiroshi self-published the collected chapters on August 16, 1998.

== Cast ==
| Character | Japanese voice actor | English voice actor |
|---|---|---|
| Ayane Mitsui | Yūko Miyamura | Debora Rabbai |
| Kunimitsu Tange | Akio Ōtsuka | Greg Wolfe |
| Kappei Inagagi | Kappei Yamaguchi | Jonathan Briggs |
| Sakurako Miyagawa | Maria Kawamura | Rose Markisello |
| Principal | Chafurin | Flavio Romeo |
| Vice Principal | Masato Hirano | Jack Taylor |
| Kayoko Nakajima | Kumiko Nishihara | Roxanne Beck |
| Ayane's Mom | Mami Horikoshi | Mandy Bonhomme |
| Kimiyo Tasaka | Megumi Tano | Mandy Bonhomme |

== Reception ==
Martin Ouellette of Protoculture Addicts gave Ayane's High Kick a positive review, calling it "loads of fun, not complicated to follow, cute and completes its mission: entertaining the viewer". He noted that although the plot is cliché for a sports anime, it is executed very well, has "cool" character designs, simple yet dynamic animation, an appropriate soundtrack, and healthy mix of action and comedy. Mania.com's Chris Beveridge similarly noted a light story, copious amount of humor, fairly well defined stereotype characters, and decent artwork for its production period. Jason Bustard of THEM Anime Reviews summarized, "Ayane's High Kick is a fun, charming, double episode pilot that like many others of its era, never managed to take off and become a full series. Fun characters and an interesting premise are marginalized by its short length and obnoxious cliches, but for what it's worth, it's a fun ride."
