= Karura Mau =

Japanese manga series

カルラ舞う!
- Genre: Mystery
- Manga

Hengen Taima Yakō Karura Mau!
- Written by: Takakazu Nagakubo
- Published by: Asahi Sonorama
- Magazine: Monthly Halloween
- Original run: September 10, 1986 – October 9, 1993
- Volumes: 18
- Anime film

Hengen Taima Yakō Karura Mau! Nara Onryō Emaki
- Directed by: Takaaki Ishiyama
- Produced by: Kazuhiko Inomata; Ritsuko Kakita; Tamaki Harada
- Written by: Yu Yamamoto
- Music by: Makoto Mitsui
- Studio: Ginga Teikoku
- Licensed by: Toei
- Released: April 8, 1989
- Runtime: 80 minutes
- Original video animation

Hengen Taima Yakō Karura Mau! Sendai Kokeshi Enka
- Directed by: Takaaki Ishiyama
- Produced by: Kazuhiko Inomata; Tamaki Harada
- Written by: Yu Yamamoto
- Music by: Makoto Mitsui
- Studio: Eizo Kobo
- Licensed by: Toei
- Released: September 14, 1990 - March 8, 1991
- Runtime: 30 minutes
- Episodes: 6
- Manga

Hengen Taima Yako Karura Mau!
- Written by: Takakazu Nagakubo
- Published by: Akita Shoten
- Magazine: Suspiria; Mystery Bonita
- Original run: March 1998 – March 2006
- Volumes: 18
- Manga

Hengen Taima Yako Karura Mau! Sukuna o Koroshita Kami-hen
- Written by: Takakazu Nagakubo
- Published by: Shiraizumi
- Magazine: Horror Silky Vol.5
- Original run: August 2020 – June 2022
- Volumes: 2

Hengen Taima Yakō Karura Mau! (Japanese: 変幻退魔夜行カルラ舞う!, Hepburn: Hengen Taima Yakō Karura Mau!; "Phantasmagoric Exorcism Night Parade – Karura Dance!"), also known as simply Karura Mau! (カルラ舞う!, Karura Mau!), is a Japanese manga series by Takakazu Nagakubo. Its first two volumes were adapted to an animated feature film in 1989 and an OVA series in 1990 respectively.

The series has been considered one of the first and greatest works in the "occult action" manga genre, as well as the onmyoji fiction genre popular in Japan. After finishing its run in 2006, it was followed by spin offs till 2018, then a prequel series, Sukuna o Koroshita Kami-hen, in 2020.

== Plot ==
For centuries, Japan has been protected by the Ōgi family, a hereditary clan of exorcists who fight the supernatural forces of evil under the protection of their patron deity Karura. Born in the 38th generation of this family, twin sisters Shoko and Maiko are endowed with the powers of the Scroll of Heaven and the Scroll of Earth, which allow them to see and banish wicked spirits. Aided by fellow spiritualist Kenmochi and government agent Nishikiori, they pose as transfer students to fight evil.

== Characters ==
Shōko Ōgi (扇翔子)
Voiced by: Hiromi Tsuru
The wisest of the sisters, Shōko possesses the Scroll of Heaven and the ability to perceive spiritual forces. She is calm and intelligent and has black hair. Her sister calls her by the nickname of "Shii-chan".
Maiko Ōgi (扇舞子)
Voiced by: Yuriko Yamamoto
A high school slacker, Maiko is the most energetic of the sisters. She has the Scroll of Earth and the power to banish spirits. She has red hair and excels at sports, being a black belt in aikido.
Oumi Ōgi (扇千景)
Voiced by: Naoko Kyoda
The sisters' grandmother and leader of their family. Although officially retired, she helps them with her guide and power in moments of need.
Tsukasa Kenmochi (剣持司)
Voiced by: Kaneto Shiozawa
A powerful onmyoji who works as a suave acupuncturist in his daily life. Nicknamed "The Dark Deathkeeper" (闇の死繰人, Yami no Shiguruto), he is a secret descendant of Abe no Seimei and persecutes those who abuse magic for bad purposes. He wields special needles named amagihagiri (天羽々切).
Chikae Ikeda (池田近江)
Voiced by: Keiichi Nanba
Chikae is a serious, polite student with spiritual abilities and a background in kenpo. The sisters met him in their first mission in Nara, covered in the anime film, where Chikae's father had been murdered through a curse. Afterwards, he joins the team and becomes Kenmochi's apprentice. He has feelings for Maiko.
Nishikiori (錦織彰)
Voiced by: Yusaku Yara
Nishikiori is a veteran police officer working for the Cabinet Intelligence and Research Office. Though initially skeptical of magic, he is in charge of cases related to the supernatural, and often acts as the sisters' liaison and bodyguard.
Wani (和珥)
Voiced by: Asami Mukaidono
An onryo from the Nara period. She was found by the sisters in their first mission and became their ally, sometimes protecting them from other spirits in their missions. She can be summoned from a small stone sphere.
Hiroe Ikeda (辰王)
Voiced by: Masashi Hironaka
Chikae's half brother, he was involved with conspiracy that murdered their father, as he planned to use them to kill their mother as well for his own reasons. Later defected and followed his own way, becoming a sporadic ally to the team, albeit developing a rivalry with Kenmochi. A proficient magic user, he acts under the masked alter ego of "Dragon King" (辰王, shinno).
