= Roxanne Beck =

American voice actress

Roxanne Beck is an American screenwriter, children's book author and voice actress. Her writing credits include the screenplay for the short film "Miss Famous" (2015) starring Kristen Wiig and the children's book "Caterpillarland" (Chakra 4 Publishing, 2015). Beck earned her MFA in Screenwriting at UCLA, where her awards included a Humanitas Drama Fellowship nomination. Her jazz/blues release "Comes Love", produced by Grammy nominee Bud Harner, received national radio airplay in 2008; her first album, Garden of Love, was released in 1997. She is also an internationally known voice actress who voiced characters on anime films released in the U.S. by Central Park Media, 4kids Entertainment and Right Stuf Inc. Originally from Searcy, Arkansas, she now lives in Los Angeles.

== Voice credits ==
- Ayane's High Kick - Kayoko
- Boogiepop Phantom - Arisa Nishi, Rie Sato
- Gall Force - Amy (Movies 2–3)
- Garzey's Wing - Falan Fa
- Gokudo - Princess Oto
- K.O. Beast - Mei-Mer's Mother
- Patlabor the Mobile Police - Additional Voices
- Pokémon - Vulpix, Giselle, Rebecca, Ramona, Ariene (Seasons 1–5)
- Pokémon 4Ever - Diana
- Record of Lodoss War: Chronicles of the Heroic Knight - Kardis, Little Neese
- Revolutionary Girl Utena - Wakaba Shinohara, Kozue Kaoru
- Urusei Yatsura 2: Beautiful Dreamer - Lum (Credited as "Ann Ulrey")
- VH1 ILL-ustrated - Hermione, Monica Lewinsky, Dr. Melfi
