= Carol Jacobanis =

American voice actress

Carol Jacobanis is an American voice actress. She is mostly known her voice roles in the English dubs for Japanese anime. Her work has been for New York–based recording studios such as Headline Studios, Central Park Media, TAJ Productions, 4Kids Entertainment, NYAV Post and DuArt Film and Video. She has also appeared in live-action television and film projects.

In the mid to late 1990s she was the lead singer in the New York based musical group Primrose Hill, and made several guest appearances at the Loser's Lounge concert series.

== Filmography ==
=== Voice roles ===
==== Anime ====
- Animation Runner Kuromi 2 – Hanako Shihonmatsu
- Aria The Animation – Akira E. Ferrari
- Boogiepop Phantom – Kanae Oikawa, Makiko Kisugi
- Comic Party – Aya Hasabe, Yuka
- Gall Force – Journey (OVAs 2-3)
- Gall Force: New Era – Marble
- Genshiken – Saki Kasukabe
- Gokusen – Yasue
- Gravitation – Karouko
- Harlock Saga – Elda
- His and Her Circumstances – Maho Izawa
- IkkiTousen: Dragon Destiny – Unchou Kan'u (credited as Janet Baywood)
- Irresponsible Captain Tylor – P.O. Harumi Nakagawa, Betty
- Kujibiki Unbalance – Saki Kasukabe
- Labyrinth of Flames – Shinka
- Magical DoReMi – Queen Lumina
- Magical Witch Punie-chan – Anego
- Mew Mew Power – Chrys (Ep. 14)
- Munto – Laika
- Ping Pong Club – Junko, Sister, Sugawara, Yuki (credited as Summer Pepper)
- Pokémon – Arielle, Ellen, Pietra, Trinity, Additional voices
- Pokémon Chronicles – Lola
- Revolutionary Girl Utena – Aiko Wakiya, Shadow Girl C, Mari Hozumi (credited as Summer Pepper)
- Shingu: Secret of the Stellar Wars – Hiromi Isozaki
- Shootfighter Tekken – Kiba's Mother
- The Third: The Girl with the Blue Eye – Paife
- To Heart – Serika Kurusugawa
- The World of Narue – Bathyscape

==== Non-anime ====
- The Boy Who Wanted To Be A Bear – Mother Bear
- Winx Club (4kids Ed.) – Headmistress Griffin

==== Live-action dubbing ====
- Beautiful Target – Kyoko (credited as Jackie Howard)
- Exte: Hair Extensions – Salon Owner
- Legend of the Devil
- Zero Woman: The Hunted – Rei

==== Video games ====
- Airforce Delta Strike – Francine. Celestial
- Winx Club video game – Headmistress Griffin

=== Film ===
- Judith – Judith (2003)
- Europe for President – Hannah Jefferson (2008)
- Loser – Therapist (2009)
- The Closed Door – Clair (2010)
- Dot – Mrs. Biltmore (2010)
- Mary and Louise – Elegant Actress (2014)
- Bridge of Faith – Miss Linsey (2014)
- Upside Down – Liz (2014)

=== Television ===
- Law & Order: Special Victims Unit – Jane Siddons (2009)
- A Crime to Remember – Peggy Fletcher (2014)
