= Naoko Matsui =

Japanese voice actress (born 1961)

- 松井 菜桜子
- Born: April 4, 1961 (age 65); Hakodate, Hokkaido, Japan
- Other name: Nao-chan (菜桜ちゃん)
- Occupations: Voice actress; narrator
- Years active: 1983–present
- Agent: up and up's
- Website: Official profile

Naoko Matsui (松井 菜桜子, Matsui Naoko; born April 4, 1961) is a Japanese voice actress and narrator affiliated with up and up's.

She is most notable for the roles of Uru Chie in High School! Kimengumi, Rem Ayanokōji in Dream Hunter Rem, Katsumi Liqueur in Silent Möbius, Chiyoko Wato in The Three-Eyed One, Runrun in Mahōjin Guru Guru, Rabby in Gall Force Eternal Story, Roux Louka in Mobile Suit Gundam ZZ, Dorothy Catalonia in Mobile Suit Gundam Wing, Azusa Shiratori in Ranma ½, Miyako Todaiji in Kamikaze Kaito Jeanne, and Sonoko Suzuki in Detective Conan.

== Filmography ==
=== TV series ===
1980s

- Cat's Eye (1983) – Biron
- Attacker You! (1984) – Nami Hayase
- Chikkun Takkun (1984) – Mukko
- Persia, the Magic Fairy (1984) – Theresa
- High School! Kimengumi (1985) – Uru Chie
- Sherlock Hound (1985) – Nicol
- Dancouga (1985) – Shirley McGovern
- Doteraman (1986) – Manami Suzuki
- Mobile Suit Gundam ZZ (1986) – Roux Louka
- Ultra B (1987) – Takemi Aoba
- Norakuro-kun (1987) – Rika Sawaguchi
- Mister Ajikko (1987) – Taro, Jiro
- Little Lord Fauntleroy (1988) - Bridget
- Osomatsu-kun (1988) – Jūshimatsu/Totoko
- Idol Densetsu Eriko (1989) – Rei Asagiri
- The Adventures of Peter Pan (1989) – Wendy Darling
- Jushin Liger (1989) – Yui Kamishiro
- Magical Hat (1989) – Spin
- Ranma ½ (1989–1991) – Azusa Shiratori, Yotaro

1990s

- NG Knight Lamune & 40 (1990) – Lesqua / Arara Cafe au Lait
- Little Twin Stars (1990) – Will
- Robin Hood no Daibōken (1990) – Marian Lancaster
- The Three-Eyed One (1990) – Chiyoko Wato
- Goldfish Warning! (1991) – Yurika Sugadaira
- Marude Dameo (1991) – Sakiko Yamada
- Ashita e Free Kick (1992) – Raiza Nakamori
- Tekkaman Blade (1992) – Lille
- Cooking Papa (1992) – Shoji
- Crayon Shin-chan (1992) – Yukimi
- Mahōjin Guru Guru (1994) – Run Run
- Tottemo! Luckyman (1994) – Miyo Kireida
- Mobile Suit Gundam Wing (1995) – Dorothy Catalonia
- Sorcerer Hunters (1995) – Barubara
- Virtua Fighter (1995–1996) – Pai Chan
- Detective Conan (1996–present) – Sonoko Suzuki
- Kiko-chan's Smile (1996) – Shoko Dojima
- Martian Successor Nadesico (1996) – Inez Fressange
- VS Knight Lamune & 40 FIRE (1996) – Lesqua/Arara Cafe au Lait
- Hare Tokidoki Buta (1997) – Mama
- The Kindaichi Case Files (1997) – Ryoko Saotome,
- Silent Möbius (1998) – Katsumi Liqueur
- Gregory Horror Show (1999) – Lost Doll
- Kamikaze Kaito Jeanne (1999) – Miyako Todaiji

2000s

- Seven of Seven (2002) – Melody Honey
- Naruto (2002) – Yoshino Nara
- D.C. ~Da Capo~ (2003) – Koyomi Shirakawa
- Gankutsuou: The Count of Monte Cristo (2004) – Victoria de Danglars
- Gift ~eternal rainbow~ (2004) – Nene Himekura
- Zatch Bell! (2004) – Penny
- Black Jack (2004) – Saeki (ep. 26), Konomi Kuwata (ep. 59)
- Yu-Gi-Oh! Duel Monsters GX (2005) – Ran Kochō
- Moeyo Ken (2005) – Toshie Hijikata
- Air Gear (2006) – Rika Noyamano
- Death Note (2006) – Naomi Misora
- Futari wa Pretty Cure Splash Star (2006) – Mizu Shitataare
- Kirarin Revolution (2006) – Chairman Higashiyama
- Doraemon (2007) – Sumire Hoshino
- Kekkaishi (2007) – Princess
- Itazura na Kiss (2008) – Machiko Irie (Naoki's Mother)
- Ojarumaru (2008) – Kaminari Kisuke
- Higurashi When They Cry (2006) – Aiko Maebara
- Hamtaro (2006) - Oshare (replaced Ikue Ōtani for 1 episode)

2010s

- Kamisama Kiss (2012) – Demon Hag
- Toriko (2012) – Love, Malisman
- Silver Spoon (2013) – Komaba's Mother
- One Piece (2013) – Monet, Sind
- HappinessCharge PreCure! (2014) – Ribbon
- Aikatsu! (2015) – Kukuru Seto
- Kamisama Kiss 2 (2015) – Onikiri, Izanami
- Nobunaga no Shinobi (2016) – Matsu

=== Original video animation (OVA) ===
- Dream Hunter Rem (1985) – Rem Ayanokōji
- Bakuhatsu Miracle Nekketsu Genki! Isami (1985-1986) ― Isami Hayami
- Male Transfrom Female Mayumi-chan (1986-1987) ― Mayumi Go (Female)
- Gall Force (1986) – Rabby
- Dangaioh (1987) – Pai Thunder
- Ten Little Gall ForceSuper Deformed Double Feature (1988) – Rabby
- Gall Force Earth Chapter (1989) – Sandy Newman
- Kimagure Orange Road: Hurricane! Akane the Shape-changing Girl (1989) – Akane
- Lupin III (2005) – Emily O'brien (Leader of Angel Tactics)
- Rhea Gall Force (1989) – Sandy Newman
- Riding Bean (1989) – Rally Vincent
- Devil Hunter Yohko (1990) – Reiko
- Mobile Suit Gundam 0083: Stardust Memory (1991) – Poral Guilish
- Compiler (1994) – Compiler
- Master of Martial Hearts (2008) – Suzuko Iseshima

=== Film animation ===
- Hare Tokidoki Buta (1988) – Mama
- Windaria (1989) – Princess Ahnas
- Urusei Yatsura: Always, My Darling (1991) – Lupika
- Case Closed series (1997–) – Sonoko Suzuki
- Martian Successor Nadesico: The Motion Picture – Prince of Darkness (1998) – Inez Fressange
- Pretty Cure All Stars DX2: Light of Hope☆Protect the Rainbow Jewel! (2010) – Mizu Shitataare
- Lupin the 3rd vs. Detective Conan: The Movie (2013) – Sonoko Suzuki
- Pretty Cure All Stars New Stage 3: Eternal Friends (2014) - Ribbon
- HappinessCharge PreCure! the Movie: The Ballerina of the Land of Dolls (2014) - Ribbon
- Pretty Cure All Stars: Spring Carnival (2015) - Ribbon
- Detective Conan: Sunflowers of Inferno (2015) – Sonoko Suzuki
- Pretty Cure All Stars: Singing with Everyone Miraculous Magic (2016) - Ribbon

=== Video games ===
- Efera & Jiliora: The Emblem From Darkness (xxxx) – Efera
- Terra Phantastica (xxxx) – Dine
- Super Heroine Chronicle (xxxx) – Rem Ayanokōji
- Magical Drop F (1999) – Wheel of Fortune / Devil
- EVE new generation (2006) – Kyoko Himuro
- Project X Zone 2 (2015) – Byaku Shin
- Tokyo Afterschool Summoners (2017) – Protagonist / Christine / Ikutoshi / Kagutsuchi / Arachne
- Eve: Ghost Enemies (2022) – Kyouko Himuro

=== Dubbing ===
==== Live-action ====
- Frasier – Daphne Moon (Jane Leeves)
- French Kiss (1997 NTV edition) – Kate (Meg Ryan)
- Ghost (1999 TV Asahi edition) – Molly Jensen (Demi Moore)
- Melrose Place – Alison Parker (Courtney Thorne-Smith)

==== Animation ====
- Chip 'n Dale Rescue Rangers - Gadget Hackwrench
- Totally Spies! – Sam
- The Powerpuff Girls – Bunny
