= Eriko Hara =

Japanese voice actress

- 原 えりこ
- Born: Setsuko Matsushita; November 1, 1959 (age 66); Tokyo, Japan
- Other name: Eri Kōno (光野 栄里)
- Occupation: Voice actress
- Years active: 1982–present
- Agent: Beffect

Eriko Hara (原 えりこ, Hara Eriko; born Setsuko Matsushita (松下 節子, Matsushita Setsuko), November 1, 1959) is a Japanese voice actress currently affiliated with Beffect.

== Filmography ==
=== Television animation ===
- Gyakuten! Ippatsuman (1982) – Ran Houmu
- Tokimeki Tonight (1982) – Ranze Eto
- Ginga Hyōryū Vifam (1983) – Shalon Publin
- Once Upon a Time... Space (1984) – Petit
- Blue Comet SPT Layzner (1985) – Rei
- Mobile Suit Gundam ZZ (1986) – Elle Vianno
- Uchūsen Sagittarius (1986) – Karin
- Kimagure Orange Road (1987) – Hikaru Hiyama
- Goldfish Warning! (1991) – Cow Beauty
- Sailor Moon (1992) – Murido
- The Brave Express Might Gaine (1993) – Ruriko Senpuji
- Muka Muka Paradise (1993) - Ranka Gotenba
- Sailor Moon R (1993) – Nipasu
- Slam Dunk (1993–96) – Ayako
- Sailor Moon S (1994) – Unazuki Furuhata
- Sailor Moon SuperS (1995) – Hebihanabiko, Paopao-musume
- Sailor Moon Sailor Stars (1996) – Sailor Iron Mouse/Chuuko Nezu
- Mamotte Shugogetten (1998) – Kaori Aihara

=== Theatrical animation ===
- Doraemon: Nobita's Parallel "Journey to the West" (1988) – Princess
- Venus Wars (1989) – Susan
- Slam Dunk (1994) – Ayako
- Slam Dunk: Conquer the Nation, Hanamichi Sakuragi! (1994) – Ayako
- Slam Dunk: Shohoku's Greatest Challenge! (1995) – Ayako
- Slam Dunk: Howling Basketman Spirit!! (1995) – Ayako
- Soreike! Anpanman Yomigaere Bananajima (2012) – Pyonkichi

=== OVA ===
- Gall Force (1986) – Patty
- Wanna-Be's (1986) – Miki Morita

=== Video games ===
- Super Robot Wars Alpha (2000) – Elle Vianno
- Xenosaga Episode I: Der Wille zur Macht (2002) – Pellegri
- Super Robot Wars Alpha 2 (2003) – Elle Vianno
- Xenosaga Episode II: Jenseits von Gut und Böse (2004) – Pellegri
- Super Robot Wars Alpha 3 (2005) – Elle Vianno
- Xenosaga Episode III: Also Sprach Zarathustra (2006) – Pellegri
- Super Robot Wars V (2017) – Elle Vianno
- Super Robot Wars X (2018) – Elle Vianno
- Super Robot Wars T (2019) – Elle Vianno
