= Dancouga Nova – Super God Beast Armor =

Japanese anime television series

- Cover for the 6th DVD Volume

獣装機攻ダンクーガ ノヴァ (Jūsō Kikō Dankūga Nova)
- Genre: Mecha
- Anime television series
- Directed by: Masami Ōbari
- Produced by: Sakurako Murata; Katsunori Naruke; Mutsuki Kamon; Shinji Seno
- Written by: Hideki Mitsui; Takeshi Shudo
- Music by: Kazuhiro Yamahara
- Studio: Ashi Productions
- Original network: Animax, KBS Kyoto
- Original run: 15 February 2007 – 3 May 2007
- Episodes: 12

Dancouga Nova – Super God Beast Armor (獣装機攻ダンクーガ ノヴァ, Jūsō Kikō Dankūga Nova) is a Super Robot anime television series, produced by Ashi Productions (same production company that produced the original series) and is directed by Masami Ōbari, who was also in charge of mechanical design. The series is supposedly a follow-up of its predecessor, Dancouga – Super Beast Machine God. The series premiered across Japan on the Japanese CS television network Animax, and also KBS Kyoto on 15 February 2007, spanning a total of 12 episodes.

== Plot ==
The series takes place in 2107, where small wars take place all over the globe. A team of four people; Aoi Hidaka, Kurara Tachibana, Sakuya Kamon, Johnny Bernet, are chosen to be the pilots of the mysterious large robot that "protects the weak" and stops these small-scale wars, the Dancouga Nova. Like its predecessor, Dancouga Nova is a combining robot type of Super Robot, which have four separate units with each unit having its own pilot; the Nova Eagle, Nova Rhino, Nova Liger, and Nova Elephant, that form the Super Robot Dancouga Nova. The pilots are gathered by a secret organization that maintains the Dancouga Nova and dispatches its pilots on assigned missions from the organization's base of operations, the Dragon's Hive.

== Characters ==
Aoi Hidaka (飛鷹 葵) Voiced by: Haruna Ikezawa
A red-haired, undefeated Formula-Zero One racing champion. She is the chief pilot of the Dancouga Nova and the pilot of the Nova Eagle. Aoi also models as a side job. As the pilot of Nova Eagle, she is also the primary pilot of Dancouga Nova. Shortly into the series, she decides to quit racing as she doesn't feel she can balance it with piloting Dancouga, and becomes a model full-time.
Kurara Tachibana (館華) Voiced by: Houko Kuwashima
A blue-haired, top-class Narcotics Investigator. She is the pilot of the Nova Liger. Kurara is experienced using hand-held firearms and is an expert in her profession. As a child, she and her mother were forced to witness her father beaten by thugs. Spurred on by her mother's comments that there was no such thing as justice, Kurara became the top policewoman in the country, and cleaned up the corrupt narcotics division in a year and a half.
Sakuya Kamon (加門 朔哉) Voiced by: Tatsuhisa Suzuki
A brown-haired, homeless man. He is the pilot of the Nova Rhino. Sakuya doesn't seem to care that he is unemployed and homeless. Instead, he enjoys living his life the way it is. Sakuya is the first to (unknowingly) use the original Dancouga's catchphrase "Yatte yaruze!" ("Let's do it!"), which catches on among the team before they even learn its origin. Later, he begins feeling inferior to the rest of the team as Nova Rhino's only function in Dancouga is the pivot foot, and desires a super-strong special attack to make up for it.
Johnny Bernet (ジョニー・バーネット) Voiced by: Yuuki Tai
A blonde salaryman. He is the pilot of the Nova Elephant. Johnny was a promising white-collar worker. He enjoys cooking, and reads many men's magazines, giving him a surprisingly wide and varied knowledge base. During their first mission, Sammy give him the nickname "Clark Kent", which he dislikes. Johnny is also the first to realize that the Dancouga teams seem to be selected based on the Japanese blood type personality theory - each team consists of an A, a B, an O, and an AB.
Tanaka (田中) Voiced by: Keiji Fujiwara
The commander of the Dancouga team, Tanaka is shown to know more than he lets on, but seems to genuinely care for the team's well-being. He gives the team their missions and answers their questions to the best of his ability - though all too often, the team is called into battle before he can give proper answers.
Roo Riruri Voiced by: Saori Goto
A 15-year-old psychiatrist and member of the Dancouga team, she displays a surprising level of maturity for someone her age. However, she becomes easily annoyed if her name is mispronounced. She cares for the team's mental health, and like Tanaka, tries to answer their questions as best she can. Her name and character traits seem to be a play on Ruri Hoshino from Martian Successor Nadesico, and she makes a reference to this in one instance by saying something similar to Hoshino's favorite phrase.
Sammy Voiced by: Sayaka Ohara
The chief engineer in charge of Dancouga Nova, she has a flirty, playful personality and tells the team before each mission to look out for her "baby". Later, it is revealed that she often has brief, unfulfilling relationships, and focuses on Dancouga as it, unlike a man, can't hurt her feelings. When Sakuya asked her for a private conversation shortly afterwards, she seemed surprised and interested - until it turned out that he only wanted to talk shop, annoying her greatly.
Mister F.S. Voiced by: Kazuki Yao
Also named Fog Sweeper, This mysterious, long-haired man is the overall commander of the Dancouga Nova project. Initially, he only communicates with Tanaka, but the Dancouga team meets him at a party in episode 6, in which he reveals that Dancouga is modeled after a legendary Super Robot that protected Earth from an inhuman threat.
Isabelle Cronkite Voiced by: Michiko Neya
She is a Dancouga-obsessed reporter. She later became a supporter of Dancouga.
Ada Rossa Voiced by: Yūko Gotō
She is an idol and love interest of Johnny Bernet. Later, it is revealed that she is the pilot of R-Daigun.

== Mecha ==
Dancouga Nova
The Dancouga Nova is the unit developed for the Dancouga Nova Project. Its appearance is the same as its predecessor, the Dancouga, other than the fact that the mecha get a newer design from the older models. The Dancouga Nova is a combination of four separate machines, which are the Nova Eagle, Nova Rhino, Nova Liger, and the Nova Elephant. In which each of these mecha have three different transformations; Humanoid, Beast, and Vehicle types. Dancouga Nova's weaponry include an unnamed punch which is loaded with energy, the (Dankuu Hou 断空砲 lit: Slash/Sever Space Cannon), which is an array of cannons that can be fired all at once and are used as Dancouga Nova's main weapons, the Missile Detonator, two missile launchers, (Dankuu Ken 断空剣 Slash/Sever Space Sword), an atomic-vibration blade that is one of Dancouga's strongest weapons, and the Boost Nova Knuckle, which Dancouga Nova launches its right arm. The unit can only be piloted by Aoi through a direct motion tracing system.
Each of the separate Nova mecha combine to form the Dancouga Nova:

- The Nova Eagle forms the head of the Dancouga Nova. Its design and data is based on the Eagle Fighter.
- The Nova Rhino forms the left foot of the Dancouga Nova. Its design and data is based on the Land Liger.
- The Nova Liger forms the right foot of the Dancouga Nova. Its design and data is based on the Land Cougar.
- The Nova Elephant forms the body of the Dancouga Nova. Its design and data is based on the Big Moth.
The Dancouga Nova can also go into its second mode called Dancouga Nova God Beast Mode when its Aggressive System is activated. This changes the unit's color to gold and became a beast-like mecha due to the beast modes of all four machines. Aoi unlocked this mode in episode 9 and Its powers is so intense and above the scale that it needs the whole team to pilot it. This mode ends up as a last resort to the whole team.

D-Phoenix
The D-Phoenix is a transport airship that transports the Dancouga Nova units to their destination of their missions. Very little is known of this aircraft.
D-Poseidon
The D-Poseidon is a submarine that can turn into a large robot that first premiers in episode 8 and can fly in space in the last episode.
Dragon's Hive
A large dragon battleship. It first appears in Episode 1 as the main building on Dragon's Hive Island, the main base of operations of the team, but in episode 11 it launches when the island around it is destroyed. It is based on Gandor from the original series, and like the Gandor it is both capable of powering up Dancouga (by enabling the transformation to Max God) and firing a massive cannon from its mouth.
R-Daigun
The fifth unit of Dancouga Nova Project developed alongside the 4 main machines. A red Mecha similar to the predecessor, the Black Wing, the unit has both Humanoid, Beast, and Vehicle types. It is also equipped with a stealth capability that allows it to disappear and prevents it from being detected. Its attack capabilities were just like Dancouga Nova and it is equipped with newer weapons like the Dan-Stinger a pair of machine guns with one in each wrist, the Dan-Blade and its twin lancer form Dan-Blade Twin used for close combat, the Absolute Hurricane which fires a jet of wind that can blow away certain enemies.

Its pilot is Ada and its first appearance is in Episode 4. It was then reclaimed by the Dragon's Hive after she defected from the enemy side.

Dancouga Max God
The combination between Dancouga Nova and R-Daigun, this is the final unit of the Dancouga Nova Project based on the Final Dancouga's data. Due to the combination of both units, the Dancouga Max God is the strongest of all the Dragon's Hive's machines as well as giving it an improved flight capabilities. Its armaments are similar to Dancouga Nova but with more attacks: including the (Final Dankuu Hou ファイナル・断空砲), which fires two powerful beam cannons on its back, the Missile Detonator, firing several missiles to the enemy, the Dan-Blade Shot, which fires two Dan-Blades in a boomerang-like fashion, and the Dankuu Dangai Ken 断空弾劾剣 lit: Slash/Sever Space Judgment Sword), the unit's finishing attack.
Hostile mecha
- Warroids: Appear throughout the series. The tank versions are armed with a railgun for each arm while the helicopter versions have a machine gun under each wing and can change into a humanoid form. Upgraded tank versions appear in episode 8 with two cannons for each arm instead of just one. There are also brown four-legged walker versions armed with a left arm machine gun and right arm missile launcher.
- Genocidron Tank: Appears in episode 1. Is a tank-like vehicle that turns into a robot (dubbed Grapple Mode). It attacks by swinging its arms which appear to each have four missile launchers. Appears in Super Robot Wars Z2.
- Genocidron Ground Carrier: Appears in episodes 2 and 3. Is a carrier-like vehicle that turns into a robot (dubbed Grapple Mode). It attacks by coiling around an enemy and eating it as well as a pair of turrets on the head. Appears in Super Robot Wars Z2.
- Genocidron Howitzer: Appears in episode 3. Is armed with four howitzer cannons on its back and six double barreled turrets on the torso, although they were never used.
- Deiga: Appear in episodes 4 and 5. Is armed with long range cannons and missile pods. Its grapple mode has a drill for its right arm. It was rebuilt in episode 9 only to be destroyed by R-Daigun.
- Genocidron Bomb: Appears in episode 5. Is armed with a pair of buzzsaws, thick regenerating armor, and a cobalt bomb.
- Genocidron Battleship: Appears in episode 7. Is armed with cannons all around itself although they were never used.
- Regulus Alpha: Appears in episode 10. Powers include levitation, a sphere force field, machine guns for arms, and super speed. It is the only hostile mech aside from Original Dancouga to appear in Super Robot Wars Link. It later appears in Super Robot Wars Z2.
- Reformed Regulus Body 1: Appears in episode 11. Is armed with purple energy bolts from the torso, energized fists, and a sword in the abdomen and has super speed.
- Reformed Regulus Body 2: Appears in episode 11. Is armed with super strength and energy shoulder cannons and has super speed. It can absorb rocks to make its armor stronger.
- Original Dancouga: Appears in episode 12. Powers include six impaling spears from the torso with over a dozen smaller ones in the waist, flight, invisibility, a nuclear flamethrower in the forehead, can extend its arms short distances, and a purple energy beam from the forehead. It also has very thick armor capable of withstanding the Absolute Cannon. It is the only hostile mech aside from Regulus Alpha to appear in Super Robot Wars Link. It later appears in Super Robot Wars Z2.
- Moon Will: The primary antagonist of the series that intends to destroy both humanity and Earth Will; he is stated to be the size of Dragon Hive Island. Powers include firing laser barrages from different directions and an energy cannon in the torso.

== Episodes ==
No.	Title	Written by	Original release date
1	"The Mysterious Dancouga"; Transliteration: "Nazo no Dancouga" (Japanese: 謎のダンクーガ)	Takeshi Shudo	15 February 2007
2	"Super Beast Divine Union"; Transliteration: "Chōjū Gasshin" (Japanese: 超獣合神!)	Takeshi Shudo	22 February 2007
3	"Sword of Guidance"; Transliteration: "Michibiki no Tsurugi" (Japanese: 導きの剣)	Hideki Mitsui	1 March 2007
4	"Red Dancouga"; Transliteration: "Akai Dancouga" (Japanese: 紅い(あかい) ダンクーガ)	Takeshi Shudo; Hideki Mitsui	8 March 2007
5	"Demon Wall of Grief"; Transliteration: "Nageki no Makabe" (Japanese: 嘆きの魔壁)	Takeshi Shudo	15 March 2007
6	"Unknown Attack"; Transliteration: "Michi no Shūgeki" (Japanese: 未知の襲撃)	Takeshi Shudo	22 March 2007
7	"Clash! Dancouga vs Dancouga"; Transliteration: "Gekitotsu! Dancouga tai Dancouga" (Japanese: 激突!!ダンクーガ対ダンクーガ)	Hideki Mitsui	29 March 2007
8	"Escaping from the Past"; Transliteration: "Kako karano Dasshutsu" (Japanese: 過去からの脱出)	Takeshi Shudo	5 April 2007
9	"God Beast Awakening"; Transliteration: "Shinjū Kakusei" (Japanese: 神獣覚醒)	Hideki Mitsui	12 April 2007
10	"Runaway Passion!"; Transliteration: "Netsujō no Bōsō" (Japanese: 熱情の暴走!)	Takeshi Shudo	19 April 2007
11	"Destruction? Dragon Fang Island!"; Transliteration: "Funsai? Ryūgajima!" (Japanese: 粉砕?龍牙島!)	Takeshi Shudo	26 April 2007
12	"Soaring for the Future"; Transliteration: "Mirai heno Hishō" (Japanese: 未来への飛翔)	Shinsei Dan	3 May 2007
