= Debora Rabbai =

American actress

- Born: New York City, New York, U.S.
- Other name: Angora Deb
- Education: American Academy of Dramatic Arts
- Occupation: Voice actress
- Years active: 1996–present
- Website: https://www.debrabbai.com/

Debora Rabbai (born January 14) is an American voice actress based in New York City.

== Biography ==
Rabbai is a graduate of the American Academy of Dramatic Arts.

She is best known as the voice of Aika Sumeragi from Agent Aika, Rika Sena from Kare Kano, Hakufu Sonsaku from Ikki Tousen: Dragon Destiny, Leina from the Queen's Blade series, as well as Futaba Murata and Nayuta Moriyama from Shingu.

Rabbai is an accomplished improv comedian, and is the producer, co-creator and a performer in the musical comedy Broadway's Next Hit Musical!. She teaches improv comedy at the American Comedy Institute.

== Dubbing roles ==
=== Anime ===
Year	Title	Role	Notes	Ref.
1996	Battle Arena Toshinden	Sofia		
1997	Maze	Female Maze/Mei Ikaruga	As Angora Deb	
1997	Voltage Fighter Gowcaizer	Shaia Himazaki		
1998	Ayane's High Kick	Ayane Mitsui		
1999	Birdy the Mighty	Hazumi Senkawa		
1999	Agent Aika	Aika Sumeragi	As Angora Deb	
1999	Record of Lodoss War: Chronicles of the Heroic Knight	Leaf, Marfa		
1999	To Heart	Akari Kamigishi	As Angora Deb	
2000	Geobreeders	Kikujima Yuki, Maki Umezaki		
2001	Boogiepop Phantom	Boogiepop, Tōka Miyashita, Sayako Oikawa		
2001	Gokudo	Rubette		
2002	Kare Kano: His and Her Circumstances	Sena Rika	As Angora Deb	
2002	Legend of Himiko	Shino		
2003	Rhea Gall Force	Sandy Newman	As Angora Deb	
2003, 2006	Animation Runner Kuromi	Aoi Fukami, Battobi	As Angora Deb, 2 seasons	
2003	K.O. Beast	Mei-Mer		
2005	Shingu: Secret of the Stellar Wars	Futaba, Nayuta	As Angora Deb	
2007	The Third	Millie	As Angora Deb	
2009	Ikki Tousen: Dragon Destiny	Hakufu Sonsaku	As Angora Deb	
2010	Queen's Blade: The Exiled Virgin	Leina	As Angora Deb	

=== Video games ===
Year	Title	Role	Notes	Ref.
2000	Shenmue	Ling Sha Hua		
