= Naoko Watanabe (voice actress) =

Japanese voice actress

- 渡辺 菜生子
- Born: November 21, 1959 (age 66); Suginami, Tokyo, Japan
- Education: Nihon University
- Occupation: Voice actress
- Years active: 1982–present
- Agent: Aoni Production
- Height: 150 cm (4 ft 11 in)

Naoko Watanabe (渡辺 菜生子, Watanabe Naoko; born November 21, 1959) is a Japanese voice actress. She is affiliated with Aoni Production.

== Filmography ==
=== Television animation ===
- Princess Sarah (1985) – Lottie Legh
- Bosco Adventure (1986–1987) – Raby
- Dragon Ball (1986–1989) – Pu'ar, Snow, Mint
- Saint Seiya (1986–1990) – Miho
- Dragon Ball Z (1989–1996) – Chi-Chi (episode 88 onwards), Pu'ar
- Chibi Maruko-chan (1990–present) – Tamae Honami (Tama-chan)
- Dragon Ball GT (1996–1997) – Chi-Chi
- Tales of Destiny (1997) – Chelsea Torn
- Dragon Ball Kai (2009–2015) – Chi-Chi, Pu'ar
- Stitch! ~ Zutto Saikō no Tomodachi ~ (2010-2011) – Dark End
- Dragon Ball Super (2015–2018) – Chi-Chi, Pu'ar

=== Original video animation ===
- Leda: The Fantastic Adventure of Yohko (1985) – Omuka
- Gall Force (1986-1992) - Catty
- Vampire Princess Miyu (1988–1989) – Miyu
- Dragon Ball Z Side Story: Plan to Eradicate the Saiyans (1993) - Chi-Chi
- Phantom Quest Corp. (1994-1995) - Sumei
- Haré+Guu (2001) – Guu
- Dragon Ball: Yo! Son Goku and His Friends Return!! (2008) – Chi-Chi, Pu'ar

=== Theatrical animation ===
- Dragon Ball: Curse of the Blood Rubies (1986) – Pu'ar
- Dragon Ball: Sleeping Princess in Devil's Castle (1987) – Pu'ar
- Wicked City (1987) – Secretary
- Dragon Ball: Mystical Adventure (1988) – Pu'ar
- Dragon Ball Z: The Tree of Might (1990) – Pu'ar
- Dragon Ball Z: Lord Slug (1991) – Chi-Chi
- Dragon Ball Z: Cooler's Revenge (1991) – Chi-Chi
- Dragon Ball Z: Super Android 13! (1992) − Chi-Chi
- Dragon Ball Z: Broly – The Legendary Super Saiyan (1993) – Chi-Chi
- Dragon Ball Z: Bojack Unbound (1993) – Chi-Chi
- Dragon Ball Z: Fusion Reborn (1995) – Chi-Chi
- Dragon Ball: The Path to Power (1996) – Pu'ar
- Dragon Ball Z: Battle of Gods (2013) – Chi-Chi, Pu'ar, Marron
- One Piece Film: Gold (2016) – Tempo
- Dragon Ball Super: Broly (2018) - Gine

=== Video games ===
- Ys I & II (1989) – Feena
- Tales of Destiny (1997) – Chelsea Torn
- Snow (2002) – Meiko Tachibana
- Dragon Ball series (2003–present) – Pu'ar, Chi-Chi (Budokai 3 onwards)
- Dragon Ball Fusions – Gine
- Rune Factory 5 (2021) - Yuki
- Dragon Ball: Sparking! Zero (2024) - Chi-Chi

=== Dubbing roles ===
- Miracle on 34th Street – Susan Walker (Mara Wilson)
