= Yusaku Yara =

Japanese actor & voice actor (born 1948)

- 屋良 有作
- Born: Susumu Kawabe; March 15, 1948 (age 78); Tokyo, Japan
- Occupations: Actor; voice actor; narrator
- Years active: 1975–present
- Agent: Aoni Production
- Height: 174 cm (5 ft 9 in)

Yūsaku Yara (屋良 有作, Yara Yūsaku; born March 15, 1948) is a Japanese actor, voice actor and narrator from Tokyo, Japan. His real name is Susumu Kawabe (川辺 奨, Kawabe Susumu), and his former stage name was Tetsu Kurobe (黒部 鉄, Kurobe Tetsu). Previously, he was the representative director of the voice actor office vi-vo, but it was dissolved due to old age.

He is best known for his roles in Saint Seiya as Sagittarius Aiolos, Chibi Maruko-chan as Hiroshi Sakura, Wicked City as Renzaburō Taki, Snatcher as Gillian Seed, Kiteretsu Daihyakka as Kiteretsu's Papa, the 1989 version of Sally, the Witch as Sally's Papa, Fang of the Sun Dougram as Jacky Zalshiev, Saburō Umezu in Zipang and the Dr. Slump remake as Senbei Norimaki. He was also the first dubbing voice actor of Arnold Schwarzenegger in his early days.

== Filmography ==
=== Television animation ===
1970s

- Tekkaman: The Space Knight (1975) (Guard)
- Goliath the Super Fighter (1976) (Soldier)
- 009 (1979) (1979) (Odin)
- Lupin the Third Part II (1979) (Terrorist)

1980s

- Panzer World Galient (1984) (Jilmzen Ranvel)
- Ginga Nagareboshi Gin (1986) (Great)
- Saint Seiya (1986) (Phecda Gamma Thor, Sagittarius Aiolos)
- Kimagure Orange Road (1987) (Master)
- Kiteretsu Daihyakka (1988) (Kiteretsu Kite and Eitarō Kite)
- Sakigake!! Otokojuku (1988) (Ryuuji Toramaru)
- Tatakae!! Ramenman (1988) (Dokuroken Gundam)
- Sally the Witch (1989) (Sally's Papa)

1990s

- Chibi Maruko-chan (1990) (Hiroshi Sakura)
- Transformers: Zone (1990) (Dai Atlas)
- 21 Emon (1991)
- The Laughing Salesman (1992)
- GeGeGe no Kitarō 4th TV series (1996) - (Pii)
- Dr. Slump (Remake) (1997) (Senbei Norimaki)

2000s

- Weekly Story Land (Richard Jones, Religion Group (Man in Black), Shigeyuki Minamida)
- Yu-Gi-Oh! Duel Monsters (2003) (Ironheart)
- Avenger (2003) (Cross)
- Zipang (2004) (Saburo Umezu)
- Kotencotenco (2005) (Ninja)
- Katekyo Hitman Reborn (2006) (Timoteo)
- Ray the Animation (2006) (Director Sawa)
- Shigurui (2007) (Gonzaemon Ushimata)
- Golgo 13 (2008) (José Campos)
- Gintama (2009) (Jiraia)
- Lupin the 3rd vs. Detective Conan (2009) (Duke Gerard Musca Vespaland)

2010s

- Sengoku Collection (2012) (Narrator)
- Toriko (2012) (Chin Chinchin)
- Coppelion (2013) (Denjiro Shiba)
- The Pilot's Love Song (2014) (Leopold Melze)
- Ping Pong (2014) (Jō Koizumi/Butterfly Joe)
- Saint Seiya: Soul of Gold (2015) (Sagittarius Aiolos)
- Brave Witches (2016) (Narration (eps. 1-3, 12 epilogue), Erhard von Manstein (ep. 4, 10-12))
- Dragon Ball Super (2016) (Senbei Norimaki (ep. 69))
- Kamiwaza Wanda (2016) (Kon Batora)
- Attack on Titan Season 3 (2018) (Rod Reiss)
- Wise Man's Grandchild (2019) (Merlin Walford)

2020s

- The 8th Son? Are You Kidding Me? (2020) (Brantack Lyngstad)
- Platinum End (2021) (The Aged God)
- Demon Slayer: Kimetsu no Yaiba (2023) (Tecchin Tecchikawahara)

=== Original video animation (OVA) ===
- Vampire Hunter D (1985) (Greco)
- Dominion (1988) (Charles Brenten)
- Demon City Shinjuku (1988) (Mephisto)
- Legend of the Galactic Heroes (1988) (Narrator)
- Baoh (1989) (Walken)
- RG Veda (1991) (Zōchōten)
- Black Lion: Fear the Black Lion (1992) (Ginnai Doma)
- Kyō Kara Ore Wa!! (1993) (Katsutoshi Imai)
- Dragon Ball Z Side Story: Plan to Eradicate the Saiyans (1993) (Lord Slug & Hatchiyack)
- Phantom Quest Corp. (1994) (Rokkon)
- Birdy the Mighty (1996) (Geega)

=== Original net animation (ONA) ===
- Akuma-kun (2023) (Satan)

=== Theatrical animation ===
- Doraemon: Nobita's Little Star Wars (1985) (Dracolulu)
- Fist of the North Star (1986) (Nunchaku Man)
- Wicked City (1987) (Taki Renzaburō)
- Dragon Ball Z: Lord Slug (1991) (Lord Slug)
- The Weathering Continent (1992) (Bois)
- Doraemon: Nobita and the Kingdom of Clouds (1992) (Chief)
- Bonobono (1993) (Araiguma-kun)
- Ninja Scroll (1993) (Genpachi)
- Doraemon: Nobita and the Tin Labyrinth (1993) (Garion Marquis)
- Doraemon: Nobita's Three Visionary Swordsmen (1994) (Spaidol General)
- Dr. Slump: Arale's Surprise (1999) (Senbei Norimaki)
- Vampire Hunter D: Bloodlust (2001) (Borgoff)
- Crayon Shin-chan: The Storm Called: The Battle of the Warring States (2002) (Yoshitoshi Matabe Ijiri)
- Tokyo Godfathers (2003) (Miyuki's father)
- Doraemon: Nobita and the Windmasters (2003) (Storm)
- Highlander: The Search for Vengeance (2008) (Rudy)
- Planzet (2010) (Commissioner Yoshizawa)
- After School Midnighters (2012) (Michael)

=== Video games ===
- Ys I & II (1989)
- Tengai Makyou: Ziria (1989)
- LUNAR: Silver Star Story (1992) (Ramus Farmain & Hakuryuu Fydie (White Dragon Quark))
- Snatcher (1992) (Gillian Seed)
- Double Dragon (1995) (Dulton)
- Voltage Fighter Gowcaizer (1995) (Sheng-Long/Gouichirou Kaiza)
- Lunar: Silver Star Story Complete (1996) (Quark, Mel de Alkirk, Myght)
- Cobra the Shooting (1996) (Cobra)
- Ore no Shikabane o Koete Yuke (1999) (Narrator/Genta)
- 3rd Super Robot Wars Alpha: To the End of the Galaxy (2005) (Shiva Gozzo)
- Metal Gear Solid: Portable Ops (2006) (Python)
- Assassin's Creed (2007) (Al Mualim)
- Too Human (2008) (Tyr) (Japanese dub)
- Resident Evil: Revelations 2 (2015) (Barry Burton) (Japanese dub)
- Resident Evil Remaster HD (2015) (Barry Burton) (Japanese dub)
- Lego Dimensions (2016) (Daleks) (Japanese dub)

=== Tokusatsu ===
- Ultraman 80 (1980) (Narration)
- Godzilla vs. Megaguirus (2000) (Narration)
- Kaizoku Sentai Gokaiger (2011) (Senden)

=== Dubbing roles ===
==== Live-action ====
- Arnold Schwarzenegger
  - Hercules in New York – Hercules
  - Commando (1987 TBS edition) – Col. John Matrix
  - Red Sonja (1989 NTV edition) – Lord Kalidor
  - Predator (1989 Fuji TV edition) – Major Alan "Dutch" Schaefer
  - Total Recall – Quaid
  - Eraser – John "Eraser" Kruger
  - Jingle All the Way – Howard Langston
- Samuel L. Jackson
  - Die Hard with a Vengeance (1998 Fuji TV edition) – Zeus Carver
  - Rules of Engagement (2003 Fuji TV edition) – Col. Terry L. Childers
  - Django Unchained – Steven
- Above the Law – Detective Sergeant Nico Toscani (Steven Seagal)
- The Adventures of Pluto Nash – Bruno (Randy Quaid)
- Aliens (1988 TBS edition) – Corporal Dwayne Hicks (Michael Biehn)
- Apollo 13 (2003 Fuji TV edition) – Deke Slayton (Chris Ellis)
- Armageddon (2002 Fuji TV edition) – Charles 'Chick' Chapple (Will Patton)
- Assault on Precinct 13 – Marion Bishop (Laurence Fishburne)
- The Big Blue (1990 TV Asahi edition) – Enzo Molinari (Jean Reno)
- Brazil (1992 TV Asahi edition) – Spoor (Bob Hoskins)
- Broadcast News (1989 TBS edition) – Aaron Altman (Albert Brooks)
- City of Ghosts – Marvin (James Caan)
- Child's Play – Detective Mike Norris (Chris Sarandon)
- Chinatown (1981 TV Tokyo edition) - Duffy (Bruce Glover)
- Counterpoint (1982 TBS edition) – Lt. Long (Linden Chiles)
- Death Wish 3 – Rodriguez
- Die Hard (1992 Fuji TV edition) – Deputy Police Chief Dwayne T. Robinson (Paul Gleason)
- Doc Hollywood – Hank Gordon (Woody Harrelson)
- Doctor Who – Daleks
- Dragon Lord – Cowboy Chin (Mars)
- Face/Off (2000 Fuji TV edition) – Tito Biondi (Robert Wisdom)
- Flubber – Smith (Clancy Brown)
- Forrest Gump (2000 Fuji TV edition) – Benjamin Buford "Bubba" Blue (Mykelti Williamson)
- Hard Boiled (1999 Fuji TV edition) – Supt. Pang (Philip Chan)
- Highwaymen (2007 TV Tokyo edition) – Will Macklin (Frankie Faison)
- The Hitchhiker's Guide to the Galaxy – The Guide (Stephen Fry)
- Home Alone (1994 Fuji TV edition) – Gus Polinski (John Candy)
- Jingle All the Way (2000 Fuji TV edition) – Myron Larabee (Sinbad)
- Jumanji (1998 Fuji TV edition) – Carl Bentley (David Alan Grier)
- Kung Fu Hustle – The Beast (Leung Siu-Lung)
- The Last Castle – Colonel Winter (James Gandolfini)
- Learning to Drive – Darwan Singh Tur (Ben Kingsley)
- Léon: The Professional (2009 Blu-Ray edition) – Tony (Danny Aiello)
- Magnum Force (1987 TV Asahi edition) – Alan "Red" Astrachan (Kip Niven)
- Matchstick Men – Dr. Harris Klein (Bruce Altman)
- Mississippi Burning (1992 TV Asahi edition) – Clayton Townley (Stephen Tobolowsky)
- Mr. Vampire – Wai (Billy Lau)
- The Natural (1989 TV Asahi edition) – Bartholomew "Bump" Bailey (Michael Madsen)
- Navy SEALs (1993 TV Asahi edition) – William "Billy" Graham (Dennis Haysbert)
- Painted Faces – Master Yu (Sammo Hung)
- Passenger 57 (1996 NTV edition) – John Cutter (Wesley Snipes)
- Platoon (1989 TV Asahi edition) – Big Harold (Forest Whitaker)
- Poltergeist (1985 Fuji TV edition) – Ryan (Richard Lawson)
- Predator 2 (1994 TV Asahi edition) – Captain Phil Heinemann (Robert Davi)
- Rainbow Drive (1992 TV Tokyo edition) – Mike Gallagher (Peter Weller)
- Rambo: First Blood Part II (1990 TBS and 1995 TV Asahi editions) – Michael Reed Ericson (Martin Kove)
- Robin Hood: Prince of Thieves (1993 TV Asahi edition) – Azeem Edin Bashir Al Bakir (Morgan Freeman)
- Salvador (1989 Fuji TV edition) – Dr. Rock (James Belushi)
- Scanners (1987 NTV edition) – Benjamin Pierce (Robert Silverman)
- Shopgirl – Ray Porter (Steve Martin)
- Sons of Anarchy – Clay Morrow (Ron Perlman)
- Speed 2: Cruise Control (2000 Fuji TV edition) – Juliano (Temuera Morrison)
- Surviving Christmas – Tom Valco (James Gandolfini)
- Ted 2 – The Judge (Ron Canada)
- A Time to Kill (1999 Fuji TV edition) – Harry Rex Vonner (Oliver Platt)
- The Cannonball Run (1987 TV Asahi edition) – Terry (Terry Bradshaw)
- The Fly II (1991 TV Asahi edition) – Dr. Trimble (William S. Taylor)
- The Shield – Jon Kavanaugh (Forest Whitaker)
- The Terminator (1987 TV Asahi edition) – Alley cop (Ed Dogan)
- The Thing (1985 TBS edition) – Childs (Keith David)
- Teenage Mutant Ninja Turtles: Out of the Shadows – Baxter Stockman (Tyler Perry)
- Van Helsing – Frankenstein's monster (Shuler Hensley)
- V for Vendetta – Eric Finch (Stephen Rea)

==== Animation ====
- Aladdin (Razoul)
- Aladdin and the King of Thieves (Razoul)
- Back to the Conscience (Quarrel Uncle)
- G.I. Joe: A Real American Hero (Duke)
- Meet the Robinsons (Bowler Hat Guy)
- The Pebble and the Penguin (Rocko)
- Peter Pan (Pirates Rusty)
- Pinocchio (Quarrel Uncle)
- The Polar Express (Steamer)
- The Rescuers (Orville)
- The Return of Jafar (Razoul)
- Return to Never Land (Pirates Rusty)
- Robin Hood (Friar Tuck)

=== Japanese Voice-Over ===
- Pinocchio's Daring Journey (Quarrel Uncle)
- Peter Pan's Flight (Pirates Rusty)
- E.T. Adventure (Police Edward)
- Mermaid Ragoon Theater (Announce)
- Magic Lamp Theater (Raseul)

== Accolades ==
- Merit Award at the 17th Seiyu Awards (2023)
