= Great Dangaioh =

Japanese anime television series

- Screenshot of the opening title from the animated series

破邪巨星G弾劾凰(グレートダンガイオー) (Haja Kyosei Gurēto Dangaiō)
- Genre: Mecha
- Anime television series
- Directed by: Toshiki Hirano
- Produced by: Hiroaki Inoue; Isao Hidaka; Kōji Yoritsune; Yuichi Asai
- Written by: Sumio Uetake
- Music by: Toshiyuki Watanabe
- Studio: AIC
- Original network: TV Asahi
- Original run: 5 April 2001 – 5 July 2001
- Episodes: 13

Hyper Combat Giant Great Dangaioh (破邪巨星G弾劾凰(グレートダンガイオー), Haja Kyosei Gurēto Dangaiō; known simply as Dangaioh G) is a 2001 Japanese mecha anime series produced by AIC as the sequel to the 1987 OVA Hyper Combat Unit Dangaioh. It is directed by Toshiki Hirano and written by Sumio Uetake, while Hirano's wife, Narumi Kakinouchi, was the animation director for episodes 1 and 3. It aired in TV Asahi in Japan from 5 April 2001 to 5 July 2001.

== Plot ==
Somewhere in Japan, a bright light suddenly blasted from the ground. The light in a blink destroyed everything within a hundred-mile radius. People argued that falling space debris caused it, but others felt that the unusual movement of terrestrial magnetism caused the light. The truth, however, remained hidden and blurred from people's memories. A little girl named Miya is the only one that knows what the light is.

Ten years later, an army of giant robots suddenly appear and devastates the Earth. They call themselves "EX Tartaro," whom pilot four major robots - the Four Kyokuohand. Their mission is to "purify the world". Three battle robots, the Dangaioh, defeated the enemy with ease. Sensing the strength of their enemy, the Ex Tartao united to form one giant robot. The three members of the Dangaioh team united into Dangaioh to reveal their true powers and eventually destroyed the invading force. The plot was devised by madman Dr. Katou, who was once the co-planner of the Dangaioh. The Dangai Project began preparations for a battle from a threat from the outer space pirate "Bunker". Dr. Katou and Yonamine had a big dispute, leading to Dr. Katou's betrayal. Now, in a secret underground organization, Dr. Yonamine and the Dangaioh are prepared to face off against Dr. Katou and his robotic troops.

== Characters ==
=== Main characters ===
Kuya Amagi
Voiced by: Chihiro Suzuki
A 15-year-old boy who is the Dangaioh B's pilot and leader of Dangaioh. He carries on the will of his brother, who was the official nominee for pilot on the Dangaioh project. He has a lot of faith and mental prowess to make up for his weaknesses. He's a quiet but hot-blooded young man. Aside from that, he is also very sensitive. Kuya can be very indecisive however. For example, he would give up his life to protect someone he likes, but when someone confesses love for him, he cannot give them a clear answer.
Manami Mishio
Voiced by: Ayako Kawasumi
A 15-year-old girl who is the pilot of Dangaioh's F and controls the brain of Dangaioh. Although Mishio isn't as physically fit and strong as the other pilots, she has an amazing memory and analytical skills, which prove useful in combat. She is also quiet, tender and always has a smile on her face.
Hitomi Chidou
Voiced by: Masumi Asano
A 15-year-old girl who is the Dangaioh's X pilot and controller of Dangaioh's heart. Hitomi uses "hot-blooded", "Battle Soul" and "Victory" in her guiding philosophy. She's very upfront and speaks her mind. She has seen the gentle side of Kuya in battle and has a bit of an attraction for him. Hitomi has the courage to charge into a group of enemies in a fight.

=== Supporting characters ===
Gunji Yonamine
Voiced by: Takeshi Aono
The leader of the Dangai Project and the creator of Dangaioh. He is the leading authority in robotic engineering. Gunji easily won the title of "genius scientist" while he was still a young man. He comes from honorable ancestry and therefore is able to use his connections in politics, conglomerates, and the military to build Awaruda base and Dangaioh.
Miya Shikitani
Voiced by: Emi Shinohara
The scientist and designer of Dangaioh who is an authority on, and possesses a high-level of ESP power, maybe due to the incident that happened in the past. Ten years ago after the incident, she receives telepathic messages from an unidentified entity to begin planning a secret operation called the Dangai Project. During her time cooperating with Gunji Yonamine over the past 10 years, she continues to receive telepathic messages from the unidentified entity on designing a weapon called Dangaioh.
Chiho Kazamaki
Voiced by: Masako Katsuki
The doctor on call in the Awaruda basement. Physical and mental status of the pilots are her top priority and she constantly updates Miya Shikitani on the pilot's condition. She's also the one person the Dangaioh pilots turn to when they have problems with their lives or complaints and enjoys making fun of the younger pilots, especially Kuya. She's rather close to Miya Shikitani for some reason.
Ryuko Shima
The public relations officer of the Agwaruda base. The eldest of the support girls, she is looked upon by the others like a big sister.
Kyoko Tamahara
One of the eight main operators at the Agwaruda base and the only one that works within the central command center when Dangaioh is on an operation.
Kasumi Yamagata
Is the reserve pilot for the Dangaioh team. She's Kuya's junior and is often impatient, longing to become a permanent member of the pilot's roster.
Kozue Mori
Is the head mechanic of the Agwaruda base and leads her team in the heavy demands that maintaining the Dangaioh mechas require.
Kaori Tsukishiro
Voiced by: Maria Yamamoto
The assistant to Miya Shikitani who lives in the Awaruda Base and also possesses ESP powers. A major basement staff candidate with a short temper, mainly because she's only an assistant and candidate. She tends to pester Kuya.
Romrin
Voiced by: Yukono Satsuki
A one foot prototype medical robot that was created by an unspecified company and was planned to be destroyed due to complications with his AI that made him perverted. After some false medical procedures he can stimulate the nerve cells of Manami and Hitomi, allowing them to wake up in a frenzy if they are knocked out during battle. His head can also be separated from the rest of his body.
Mia Alice
One of the pilots of the original Dangaioh, Mia left Earth in 1987 to secretly fight against space pirates called the Bunker. Mia has strong psychic powers which allows her to devastate things around her by will, but this is checked by her compassionate nature. After the events of the original OVA her fighter crash lands to Earth causing the infamous incident and psychically comes into contact with Miya revealing her story. For the next 10 years she would remain in a stasis tube, although thanks to Miya she was able to warn the people of Earth and provide information of how the original Dangaioh was created.
Kyoji Reisen
Kyoji is a mysterious young man that is shadowing the movements of the three Dangaioh pilots. In the final episode he is revealed to be the pilot of Great Dangaioh.

=== Villains ===
Danjou Katou (Dr. Kadou)
The co-planner of Dangaioh and the enemy of Great Dangaioh in the first episode. He was opposed to Gunji Yonamine's opinions when it comes to producing manned or unmanned robots, specifically the use of human brain cells as AI. Expelled from the research institute following the disagreement, he secretly stole the robot data and related documents to build his powerful robots to achieve his goal of "purifying the world". After his death in the first episode various governments and corporations try to destroy the Peace Fort and Dangaioh in an attempt to rule the world.
Exception
Bio weapons created by the Bunker from the original OVA. Starting in the second half of the series they begin to invade earth with Dangaioh being their primary target. The Exception are easily tracked by espers such as Miya. The members of the Exception are composed of ten soldiers called the Zolfos, a scout named Gelfo, and three leaders named Bababaruba, Bucharu, and Inokirugo that only come to battle as a last resort.
- Gelfo: Appears in episode 8. Powers include encasing itself in a meteor, an eye energy ray that spawns crystals, energy absorption, a semi solid body, and eye energy balls.
- Zolfo: Appear in episodes 10 and 12. Powers include encasing themselves in a meteor, eye acid and heat lasers, spear-like fingers, and levitation.
- Bababaruba: Appears in the final episode. Powers include flight, speed, and a spear hidden in the left arm.
- Bucharu: Appears in the final episode. Powers include flight, speed, a capture ring with a tether, and a high resistance to energy based attacks.
- Inokirugo: Appears in the final episode. Powers include flight, speed, and a laser pistol stored in the right thigh.

== Mechanics ==
Dangaioh was created by Gunji Yonamine and Dr. Miya Shikitani. It is formed by 3 separate robots codenamed Dangai-numbers; the Dangaioh B, Dangaioh F, and Dangaioh X.

- Dangaioh B (Burst)

Dangaioh B is piloted by Kuya Amagi. Because this unit places the most stress upon a pilot, it was given to Kuya, who was seen as physically strong enough to handle the unit. Burst forms the head and chest of Dangaioh when merged and gives the pilot of Dangaioh Burst primary control of Dangaioh itself. Alone, it primarily uses an automatic rifle with sniper-like range.

- Dangaioh F (Flail)

Dangaioh F is piloted by Manami Mishio. Not built for physical combat, Flail's role is electronic warfare, jamming, analysis, and recon. When merged into Dangaioh, Flail forms the body. In combat, its primary weapon is a cloud of electronic beacons that disrupts enemy functions. Dangaioh F is also the most fragile of the three.

- Dangaioh X (Cross)

The Dangaioh X is piloted by Hitomi Chidou. Of the three Dangai Numbers, Cross has the heaviest armor and highest power output, due to the fact it houses the main engine for the merged Dangaioh, of which it forms the legs. In battle, X excels mainly on close combat, using kicks and punches that are augmented by Dangaioh's engine. It is equipped with a single edge combat knife stored in the left wrist and a grappling hook launcher in the right wrist; at one point it was equipped with a pair of sais.

=== Dangaioh ===
When all three Dangai-numbers are put together, they form Dangaioh. Dangaioh excels at fighting opponents accordingly using high-speed maneuvers and its powerful weapons. However, its overall strengths cannot fully function in an underwater environment. The battle abilities of the Dangaioh require high human tolerances. The pilots of the Dangaioh are subject to constant physical stress, even the possibility of death if they stay in their units for too long. Therefore, the Dangaioh requires its pilots to be physically and psychologically strong and have excellent teamwork abilities.
With various weapons equipped, this makes Dangaioh have various attacks to help defeat its enemies:
- Burning Gloves: Dangaioh's forearms are fired out with high-powered rockets and still be controlled to grab or subdue the opponent.
- Burning Pressure (Pressure Burning Glove): Extra boosters on the rocketing forearms are fired to increase speed and power.
- Flame Arrow: A blue stream of energy is fired from a particle beam cannon mounted on the chest.
- Dangai Blade: A pair of blue beam sabers are released from the upper arm slots where the forearm used to be.
- Cross Tornado: With a pair of high-powered boosters fired on each side of the body, Dangaioh spins at high speeds while holding the Dangai Blades high. Then launches itself towards the opponent either punching a hole through or slice them in half. This attack it often performed while having the Burning Gloves holding the enemy in place.
- Stream Blaster: The newest and most powerful weapon equipped onto Dangaioh. The red chest plate would fire a wave of red energy that would obliterate everything in its path including enemies as strong as Bucharu. However, its power was too much for the pilots to handle that it risks their safety and takes a long time to charge.
- Acid Resistant Armor: As demonstrated against its battle with Timur, Dangaioh's armor is thick enough to withstand highly acidic attacks.

=== Dangaioh Ur ===
A prototype of Dangaioh more closely related to the Dangaioh from the original OVA. After a freak accident during a test run, Dr. Kadou used the brain cells of the pilot, allowing it to run indefinitely before the doctor was expelled. Somehow awakening after the arrival of the Exception, Dangaioh Ur revealed itself to the Dangaioh team to destroy it in the final three episodes. Due to Ur's AI, it cannot stop fighting and therefore will continually deteriorate until it ceases to function.
- God's Wings: Retractable wings that allows it to fly at super sonic speeds and encase itself in flames.
- Distortion Punch: Launching its arms against enemies with more force than the Burning Gloves.
- Dan Flame: A flamethrower in the mouth.
- Hyper Laser: A laser concentrated from the panels on its shoulders and thighs.
- Zero Excalibur: A large katana stored into a dimensional pocket until Ur summons it.
- Dangai Beam: An energy beam similar to the Flame Arrow fired from the forehead and eyes.
- Gaioh Cutter Boomerangs: A pair of sharp boomerangs.
- Armed Missiles: Homing missiles from the left knee.
- Counter Chain: A restraining chain from the right wrist.
- Distortion Phaser: Energy balls spawned and thrown with tremendous force.
- God's Tornado: An attack similar to the Cross Tornado used when God's Wings are extended.

=== Terrorist Mecha ===
- Tartarus Knight: Appear in episode 1. Powers include a machine gun for the right hand, swimming, and a pair of blaster cannons on the torso.
- Cerberus: Appears in episode 1. Powers include swimming and head lasers from the mouths of the side heads.
- Harpy: Appears in episode 1. Its only known power is super sonic flight.
- Charon: Appears in episode 1. Powers include swimming and remote lasers disguised as energy balls.
- Pluto: Appears in episode 1. Powers include swimming and a large club.
- Kokyutosu: Appears in episode 1. Powers include flight and dozens of laser turrets. It serves as Dr. Katou's flying fortress.
- Teyupon: Appears in episode 2. Powers include swimming, summoning the six robo birds, head lightning bolts, and eye lasers.
  - Robo Bird: Appear in episode 2. Powers include super sonic flight, talons, and mouth sonic waves.
- Abbas: Appears in episode 3. Powers include flight and carrying Timur in its mouth.
- Archimedes: Appears in episode 3. Powers include swimming, a sickle for the right arm, and a flamethrower for the left arm.
- Timur: Appears in episode 3. Powers include an acidic nano-machine based body and reforming.
- Build Ranger: Appears in episode 4. Powers include dividing into a pair of steam rollers, a pair of shovel claws, and a bulldozer, four EMP field emitting probes, foot treads, a drill on each shoulder, and an abdomen tazer.
- Space Catapult Drone: Appear in episode 5. Their only known power is a machine gun for the left hand.
- Night Stoke: Appears in episode 5. Powers include morphing into a shuttle, super sonic flight, satellite hacking, and a solar powered beam from the head.
- Shizaku G: Appears in episode 6. Powers include a submarine mode, swimming, scythe arms, twelve torpedo launchers from the back, and an ultrasonic emitter from the mouth.
- Daidalos XV: Appears in episode 7. Powers include a cruise ship mode, an energy resistant anchor in the right wrist, and dozens of missiles in the head.
- Dai-Ankokuten: Appears in episode 9. Powers include sensor disrupting fog from the hair, explosive shurikens, high jumping, a katana, and merging with Hikio.
  - Hikio: Appears in episode 9. Powers include burrowing, twin mouth missile launchers, and wrecking ball arms.
- Elk: Appears in episode 10. Powers include flight, a tomahawk, and a crossbow with explosive arrows on the left arm, and self destructing.
  - Elk Flying Carrier Plane: Appears in episode 10. Powers include flight and double barreled turrets on its top.

== Episodes ==
The series was originally intended to be 26 episodes long, but was cancelled halfway due to poor reviews and low ratings. This prompted creator Toshiki Hirano to state at an anime event that "Any series called Dangaioh seems destined to not be completed", as the original Dangaioh OVA series was also left unfinished. Though this series did seem to try and resolve the cliffhanger of the OVA by including at least one character from it in this series.

No.	Title	Original air date
1	"Decisive Battle"; Transliteration: "Kessen" (Japanese: 決戦)	April 5, 2001
2	"Hold a Fort"; Transliteration: "Osoru Dai Yōsai" (Japanese: 躍る大要塞)	April 12, 2001
3	"Serious Attack! 3 Sandstorm Majin?!"; Transliteration: "Kyōshū! Sandai Sabaku Majin?!" (Japanese: 強襲! 三大砂漠魔人!?)	April 19, 2001
4	"The Castle in Crisis"; Transliteration: "Orio no Naka no Toride" (Japanese: 檻の中の砦)	April 26, 2001
5	"Devil From the Sky"; Transliteration: "Tenkū no Akuma" (Japanese: 天空の悪魔)	May 3, 2001
6	"Caesar is Howling"; Transliteration: "Kaiō Hōkō" (Japanese: 海王咆吼)	May 10, 2001
7	"Seven Kinds of Transformation Above the Ocean!"; Transliteration: "Yōjō no Shichihenge Dai Ranbu! Dai Chinbotsu!" (Japanese: 洋上の七変化 大乱舞! 大沈没!)	May 17, 2001
8	"The Falling Star from the Evil Sky"; Transliteration: "Ma Ten Yori no Ryūsei" (Japanese: 魔天よりの流星)	May 24, 2001
9	"Sudden Strike by the Shadow of Sword!"; Transliteration: "Kishū!! Kage no Ha!!" (Japanese: 奇襲!! 影の刃!!)	June 7, 2001
10	"The Great Warrior"; Transliteration: "Idainaru Senshi" (Japanese: 偉大なる戦士)	June 14, 2001
11	"The Pass Back on Track"; Transliteration: "Fukkatsu Seishi Kako (Mono)" (Japanese: 復活せし過去(モノ))	June 21, 2001
12	"Treat of Zero"; Transliteration: "Zero no Kyōi" (Japanese: ゼロの脅威)	June 28, 2001
13	"Invincibility!! G-Dangaioh Liftoff!!"; Transliteration: "Muteki!! G·Sangaioh, Hasshin!!" (Japanese: 無敵!! G·弾劾凰、発進!!)	July 5, 2001

== Theme music ==
Opening Theme – "Fighting Chance"

- Singer: Go Takahashi
- Lyrics: Yuko Ebine
- Music: Akira Tsuji
- Producer: Takahiro Ando

Ending Theme – "Kimi no tame ni Ai wo"

- Singer: Kasumi Yamagata (Mizuno Manabi)
- Lyrics: Yuko Ebine
- Music: Akira Tsuji
- Producer: Akira Tsuji
