= Iczer Reborn =

Japanese original video animation series

冒険!イクサー3 (Bōken! Iczer-3)
- Original video animation
- Directed by: Toshiki Hirano
- Written by: Emu Arii; Manabu Nakamura; Toshiki Hirano
- Studio: AIC
- Licensed by: NA: Central Park Media; UK: Manga Entertainment
- Released: September 25, 1990 – February 25, 1991
- Episodes: 6

Iczer Reborn, known in Japan as Adventure! Iczer-3 (冒険!イクサー3, Bōken! Ikusā-3), is a 6-episode Original Video Animation series. It is the sequel to Fight!! Iczer One. Although originally released in North America on VHS and Laserdisc under the title "Iczer-3" (taken from its Japanese name), Central Park Media renamed it "Iczer Reborn" for the DVD release.

A sound novel trilogy, based on the manga version of the OVA and released as Adventure!! Iczer-3 (冒険!!イクサー3, Bōken!! Ikusā 3), functions as a sequel to the manga version of Fight!! Iczer-1, and features a 19-year-old Nagisa Kanō as the main heroine. The trilogy was released on three cassette tapes prior to the OVA.

== Plot ==
Nagisa Kasumi (the granddaughter of Nagisa Kanou, the heroine of "Fight! Iczer One") has a job as a delivery girl and makes her deliveries with a girl named Kawai on a base in the Moon. The two encounter a new race of alien villains, but are saved by Iczer-3! While Iczer-1 recovers from her long battle against Big Gold's legacy and self-proclaimed successor, Neos Gold, Sister Grey sends young Iczer-3 to Earth, and the child turns out to be the best hope against the new threat.

== Characters ==
- Iczer-3 (イクサー3, Ikusā 3)

Voiced by: Cutie Suzuki

Iczer-3 is the heroine of the series. She is the third and final gynoid produced in the Iczer line by the Cthulhu, physically appearing to be ten years old, and is the younger sister of Iczer-1. After Iczer-1 is badly injured in a battle against Neos Gold, Iczer-3 is sent to Earth to defend against Neos' forces in her stead. Iczer-3's battle strength is equal to that of Iczer-1, but she lacks the experience and maturity to use that strength properly at first. This leads to her early battle tactics being rather childish and playful. She forms a close bond with Nagisa Kasumi, and develops a deep love for her.

Like her elder sister, Iczer-3 wields energy blades in battle, preferring to use twin swords as opposed to the single blade used by Iczer-1, and is also able to summon Iczer-Robo (イクサーロボ, Ikusā Robo) to battle larger foes if necessary. Her favorite special attack is the Iczer Bomb (イクサー・ボム, Ikusā Bomu), a powerful shoulder-charge that is capable of inflicting major damage to the enemy.

- Nagisa Kasumi (霞 渚, Kasumi Nagisa)

Voiced by: Yuri Shiratori

Nagisa is the secondary heroine, and the fourteen-year-old partner of Iczer-3. She lives on a lunar colony with her best friend Kawai Shizuka, and works part-time at a fast-food delivery service. When Neos Gold's forces attack, she is at the Moonbase delivering food to the crew of the Queen Fuji (クィーン・フジ號, Kuīn Fuji-gou). When Fiber takes Kawai hostage, she offers herself instead, and is about to be attacked when Iczer-3 intervenes. From that point on, she becomes a key player in the war against Neos Gold's evil forces.

As Iczer-3's partner, she develops a powerful telepathic bond with the gynoid. Shortly after, she also begins to frequently experience strange dreams. These dreams are in fact a flashback to the Iczer-1 OVA, revealing that she is the granddaughter of Iczer-1's partner, Nagisa Kanō. Like her grandmother before her, Nagisa's emotional state is the key to powering Iczer Robo in battle, though it is later revealed that Iczelio Energy (イクセリオ・エネルギー, Ikuserio Enerugī) is the core power source. She also acts as Iczer-3's guardian while she is on Earth, and when Iczer-1 arrives on Earth, Nagisa seems to immediately recognize her. Likewise, due to her intimate connection with Nagisa's grandmother, Iczer-1 knows Nagisa very well.

Nagisa later appears in the drama CD trilogy of the sequel series, Iczer Girl Iczelion. After Iczer-3 contacts her on Earth, she inherits the powers of the living robotic armor Iczel (イクセル, Ikuseru), becoming the titular Iczelion (イクセリオン, Ikuserion).

- Atros (アトロス, Atorosu)

Voiced by: Minami Takayama

Atros is a clone of Iczer-3 created by Neos Gold using the stolen Iczelio energy halfway through the series. Unlike Iczer-3, Atros loves to fight, and does not hesitate to attack Iczer-3 and her friends. Atros sees Neos Gold as her mother, and fought against Iczer-3 and the crew of the Queen Fuji to enable her mother to rule the world.

When she first appeared, Atros killed Bigro with a single attack, before challenging Iczer-3 to a duel. It was quickly revealed that she possessed all of Iczer-3's powers, and indeed proved to be an even match for her. It was only upon seeing Nagisa that Atros retreated to make sense of the strange feelings that were overwhelming her. Neos berated her creation, and told her not to return until Iczer-3 was dead. Atros decided the quickest way to achieve this was to eliminate Nagisa first. She failed in her second attempt as well, when Nagisa tried to sway Atros to their side. Eventually, Neos replaces Atros with Iczer-2, which proved to be the final straw for Atros. With her mother turning her back on her, Atros switched sides, choosing to think of Nagisa as her mother, and joined forces with Iczer-3 to launch a final assault on Neos' home base, and working together in concert with Iczer-3, successfully brought down the barrier around the fortress. Neos was not about to let her creation's betrayal go unpunished, however, and launched a powerful attack against Atros, mortally wounding her. Atros died in Nagisa's arms, as Iczer-3 mourned the death of a sister.

- Kawai Shizuka (静 可愛, Shizuka Kawai)

Voiced by: Yuri Amano

Kawai is Nagisa's best friend and coworker. She works with Nagisa part-time at a fast-food delivery service, and is nearly killed by Fiber when Neos' forces attack the moonbase. She later becomes a member of the Queen Fuji crew along with Nagisa and Iczer-3. Kawai is a tender-hearted person, but she is deathly afraid of insects. She also worries for the safety of her parents, who live on Earth.

- Yajin Ro (露 野人, Ro Yajin)

Voiced by: Tomohiro Nishimura

Yajin is a part-time worker at the moonbase, where he helps to fine-tune the guns on the base's various warships, including the Queen Fuji. A fifteen-year-old young man of Chinese descent, he can be quite sarcastic at times, and has lied to Iczer-3 on at least two separate occasions. Yajin has a massive crush on Nagisa, and after Iczer-3 summoned Iczer-Robo to defeat Insect, he took it upon himself to punish Iczer-3, throwing her in the brig for endangering Nagisa.

He is the sole officer in charge of the Queen Fuji's weapons systems, and is also a fairly good shot. After Nagisa discovers Golem's weak point during her transformation into her "Golem Jet" mode, Yajin damages her with a beam cannon shot to the shoulder.

During the Iczer-3 CD dramas, it is revealed Yajin was born in Osaka, Japan, and also reveals his cooking skills during an impromptu cookoff with Atros. (We later find out that his parents owned a famous Chinese restaurant.) Although he is in love with Nagisa, he started dating Kawai during the events of the "Iczelion" novelization.

- Rob Onwa (ロブ・温和, Onwa Robu)

Voiced by: Masashi Ebara

Rob is the 24-year-old chief engineer of the Queen Fuji. Unlike the rest of the crew, Rob is well built, having logged many hours of sometimes-backbreaking labor. In addition, as one would expect, he also possesses above-average physical strength. In contrast to his physical appearance, Rob is a very gentle soul at heart.

He has a lot of pride in the Queen Fuji as a warship, as well as in his status as a ranking officer in her crew. He becomes quite impressed with Iczer-3's strength in battle, even going so far as to gain a very rudimentary understanding of the alien technology involved in her creation. As the series progresses, he slowly develops a romantic relationship with the captain of the Queen Fuji, Candy Barts.

During a "gag drama" episode of the Iczer-3 CD Drama, Rob remodels the galley in a very mad scientist-like fashion, embarrassing Candy at its "anime-like magnificence".

- Candy Barts (キャンディ・バーツ, Kyandī Bātsu)

Voiced by: Emi Shinohara

Candy is the 25-year-old female captain of the Queen Fuji. Her calm demeanor allows her to achieve results more quickly than others can. During Earth's war against Neos Gold, she is the commander of the only warship able to fight back.

In the radio drama novelization of Iczelion, she is Rob's girlfriend, and often worries about the fate of the Earth, as well as for Iczer-3's safety.

- Iczer-1 (イクサー1, Ikusā 1)

Voiced by: Yuriko Yamamoto

Iczer-1 is the previous series' heroine, prototype for all Iczer series gynoids, and leader of the Cthulhu. She fought with the nefarious Big Gold in the previous series, and emerged the undisputed victor. Sadly, she had to part ways with her much-beloved Nagisa at the end of the series, understanding that Earth should follow its own destiny. But she never truly left for good, always keeping a watchful eye over Earth from afar.

Iczer-1 does battle with Neos Gold in the prologue of episode 1; the violent confrontation between the two ends in a stalemate, as Neos acknowledges that neither of them has the strength to continue the fight at that point. She then spends the majority of the OVA recovering in a healing chamber aboard the Cthulhu ship, sending Iczer-3 to defend Earth, which Neos has now targeted, in her place.

Iczer-1 physically appears to be around twenty years old, though she is likely to be far older, and as a gynoid, may even be immortal. Like all Iczer gynoids, she is capable of numerous superhuman feats, such as flight, teleportation, and telepathy. She also holds a large soft spot for her sisters, and may even think of Nagisa Kasumi as her own granddaughter, though this is unconfirmed. As in the previous OVA, Iczer-1 is voiced by Yuriko Yamamoto.

- Iczer-2 (イクサー2, Ikusā 2)

Voiced by: Keiko Toda

Iczer-2 is Iczer-1's evil twin sister, originally created by Big Gold in the previous OVA series specifically to kill Iczer-1. She was slain by Iczer-1 in battle, who avenged the death of her partner, Nagisa Kanō. After Atros' repeated failures to kill Iczer-3 and destroy the Queen Fuji, Neos Gold starts to realize that the only one capable of defeating Iczer-3 is another Iczer gynoid, and resurrects Iczer-2 to that end. However, Iczer-2 refuses to submit to Neos' will, stating her only desire is to fight Iczer-1. In response, Neos Gold tells her that by killing Iczer-3, Iczer-1 is sure to return to avenge her little sister's death.

When Iczer-2 and Iczer-3 finally meet in battle, Iczer-3 is quickly outclassed by the more experienced Iczer-2, who seems to only be toying with her. She tells Iczer-3 the reason the Iczers were created is to fight, a philosophy that Iczer-3 rejects. Later, after a fully rejuvenated Iczer-1 returns to Earth to aid Iczer-3, Iczer-2 gets her shot at revenge against her elder sister. Though she fights with all her strength, Iczer-2 is once again defeated by Iczer-1, who decides to spare her life in the end, saying she will not let another sister fall in battle. Iczer-2 then aids her sisters in the final defeat of Neos Gold, though it is Iczer-3 who delivers the finishing blow. At series' end, Iczer-2 leaves Earth to wander the Universe, thinking perhaps they will all meet again. Her current location is unknown.

- Sister Grey (シスターグレ, Shisutā Gurei)

Voiced by: Sumi Shimamoto

Sister Grey is a close friend of Iczer-1, and the creator/mother of Iczer-3. When Iczer-1 sensed Neos was attacking Earth, Sister Grey sent Iczer-3 to Earth in her place.

- Neos Gold (ネオスゴールド, Neosu Gōrudo)

Voiced by: Atsuko Takahata

Neos Gold is the series' primary antagonist. A machine-like life-form created by Big Gold's computer terminal, she refers to Big Gold, Iczer-1's nemesis, as her mother, and has indeed inherited every single bit of Big Gold's malevolent personality.

In the very beginning of the series, she engages Iczer-1 in an epic battle that ends in a stalemate, with both combatants exhausted and badly wounded. Deciding to postpone the finish of their battle until both of them have recovered, Neos declares to Iczer-1 where she has chosen to finish their battle: Earth. She then sends her four generals to Earth, in order to wipe out any resistance before her arrival. Neos hacks into every computer network on Earth, and makes her presence known to humanity, before launching a preemptive attack that wipes out more than half of Earth's military in one stroke. In just five minutes, Neos wipes out nearly two-thirds of humanity, and reduces every major city on Earth to ruins.

Neos is extremely cruel, and shows no mercy to those who fail her, even her generals; after Fiber is defeated by Iczer-3, she executes Fiber herself, then assigning Insect the task of wiping out Iczer-3. After Insect is killed in battle, Neos appears to Iczer-3 herself, and steals the Iczelio Energy from Iczer-Robo, rendering it useless in battle. She then uses this energy to create Atros, a clone of Iczer-3. As an added insurance policy, she also resurrects Iczer-2, in an effort to guard against interference by Iczer-1.

In the final episode, after the three Iczers lift Neos' massive body into space and destroy it by combining their powers, Neos launches a final desperate attack against the three unconscious gynoids. However, before she can land a fatal blow, she is slain in battle by Iczer-3, thus ending the reign of terror she unleashed upon the Earth.

- Fiber (ファイバー, Faibā)

Voiced by: Mika Doi

Fiber is one of Neos' four generals (referred to as the Shiten'nou (四天王, Shitennō) in Japanese). She uses her sharp nails for weapons in close combat, and controls her victims like marionettes. She is also the first opponent faced and defeated in battle by Iczer-3, who taunts her by calling her an "old lady", an insult that infuriates her. When she returns to Neos to beg for another chance, Neos uses her as an example and disposes of her on the spot.

- Insect (インセクト, Insekuto)

Voiced by: Urara Takano

Insect is one of Neos' four generals, and calls herself their strongest fighter. As her name would suggest, she has the power to control any and all types of insects, and uses them as her preferred means of attack. Using this power, she actually managed to wipe out a significant number of Earth's military forces, securing a foothold for Neos.

Insect proved to be a very formidable foe to Iczer-3, as her armor, made from the shells of many rhinoceros beetles, proved too tough for Iczer-3's swords to penetrate. Eventually, Insect revealed her trump card: the ability to transform into a giant insect bigger than a five-story building. Her transformation forced Iczer-3 to summon Iczer-Robo for assistance. In the end, Iczer-3 managed to kill Insect in combat, making her the only one of Neos' four generals slain in combat by Iczer-3.

- Bigro (ビグロ, Biguro)

Voiced by: Kazuko Yanaga

Bigro is one of Neos' four generals. Her partner is a bestial android named Iota, and their combination attacks proved difficult for Iczer-3 to counter at first. She loves Iota with all her heart, and when Iczer-3 kills Iota in battle, she collapses in grief, unwilling and unable to continue the battle any longer. This causes Iczer-3 to spare her life, even when she asked to be killed. Though Iczer-3 refused to finish her, Atros was more than willing to do so, and executed her.

- Golem (ゴーレム, Gōremu)

Voiced by: Rihoko Yoshida

Golem is the leader of Neos' four generals, as well as their strongest warrior. Her entire body is made up of various weapons, including beam cannons, missile launchers, and grenade launchers. At times, her weapons are even capable of outmatching Iczer-3 in battle. She also has the ability to transform into a high-speed form she calls the Golem Jet (ゴーレムジェット, Gōremu Jetto), which resembles a jet fighter. As Neos' strongest warrior, Golem has a great deal of pride in her strength. When Neos created Atros, and later resurrected Iczer-2, Golem took it upon herself to kill Iczer-3 and prove once and for all she is Neos' strongest follower.

Golem battled against Iczer-3 and the crew of the Queen Fuji twice. She proved capable of holding her own against Iczer-3, and even had the upper hand at one point in the battle, but when Yajin discovered her one weak point, she was forced to retreat after sustaining heavy damage. After repairing herself, she returned to the battlefield, intent on killing Iczer-3 and completely destroying the Queen Fuji. Before she could finish off Iczer-3, she encountered Iczer-2, who called her a weakling. When Golem attempted to attack her, Iczer-2 cut her in half with a single stroke, killing her.

== Sound Novel Staff ==
Japanese Staff
- Original Story: Toshihiro Hirano
- Director: Toshihiro Hirano
- Character Design: Toshihiro Hirano
- Script: Shou Aikawa
- Mecha Design: Yasuhiro Moriki
- Music: Takashi Kudou

== Sound Novel Cast ==
Vol. 1: "Nagisa, 19 Years Old" (「第一巻 渚・19歳」, Dai-ikkan Nagisa, 19-sai)

- Iczer-3: Miyuki Kuroi
- Nagisa Kanō: Mayumi Shou
- Mamiko Takahira (Mami): Yumiko Shibata
- Yoshihiko Nakauchi: Yasunori Matsumoto
- Colonel Shiina (Earth Defense Force): Kenji Utsumi
- Earth Defense Force Soldier: Hideyuki Tanaka
- Insector Commander Lady Beetle: Mami Koyama
- Insector Soldier Lacewing: Michie Tomizawa
- Iczer-1: Yuriko Yamamoto
- Narrator: Yuriko Yamamoto

Vol. 2: The Phantom of Iczer-2" (「第二巻 イクサー2の幻影」, Dai-ni-kan Ikusā 2 no Genei)

- Iczer-3: Miyuki Kuroi
- Nagisa Kanō: Mayumi Shou
- Yoshihiko Nakauchi: Yasunori Matsumoto
- Mamiko Takahira (Mami): Yumiko Shibata
- Colonel Shiina (Earth Defense Force): Kenji Utsumi
- Shozawa (Earth Defense Force): Hideyuki Tanaka
- Lady Beetle: Mami Koyama
- Pearl Moss: Masako Katsuki
- Red Fly: Keiko Toda
- Iczer-2: Keiko Toda
- Iczer-1: Yuriko Yamamoto
- Narrator: Yuriko Yamamoto

Vol. 3: "The Cthulhu Depart" (「第三巻 クトゥルフ還る」, Dai-san-kan Kutourufu Kaeru)

- Iczer-3: Miyuki Kuroi
- Nagisa Kanō: Mayumi Shou
- Mamiko Takahira (Mami): Yumiko Shibata
- Yoshihiko Nakauchi: Yasunori Matsumoto
- Colonel Shiina (Earth Defense Force): Kenji Utsumi
- Shozawa (Earth Defense Force): Hideyuki Tanaka
- Lady Beetle: Mami Koyama
- Pearl Moss: Masako Katsuki
- Iczer-2: Keiko Toda
- Iczer-1: Yuriko Yamamoto
- Narrator: Yuriko Yamamoto

== Sound Novel Theme Songs ==
Opening:

- Dragon Legend (ドラゴン伝説, Doragon Densetsu)
  - Lyrics: Fumiko Okada
  - Composition: Michiaki Watanabe
  - Arrangement: Michiaki Watanabe
  - Artist: Eriko Tsuruzaki

Ending:

- Energy (エナジー, Enajī)
  - Lyrics: Fumiko Okada
  - Composition: Michiaki Watanabe
  - Arrangement: Michiaki Watanabe
  - Artist: Eriko Tsuruzaki

== CD Drama Cast ==
"Waiting, Birth! Iczer-3" (「おまたせ、誕生！イクサー3」, Omatase, Tanjou! Ikusā 3)

- Iczer-1: Yuriko Yamamoto
- Iczer-3: Cutey Suzuki
- Sister Grey: Sumi Shimamoto
- Nagisa Kasumi: Yuri Shiratori
- Kawai Shizuka: Yuri Amano
- Nagisa's Father: Kaneto Shiozawa
- Nagisa's Mother: Mayumi Shou
- Neos Gold: Atsuko Takahata
- Fiber: Mika Doi
- Insect: Urara Takano
- Bigro: Kazuko Yanaga
- Golem: Rihoko Yoshida
- Cthulhu 1: Emi Shinohara
- Cthulhu 2: Satoko Yasunaga
- Giros Star Pilot: Shinichiro Miki

"Useless Honorable View! Neos' Big Four Strike Back!!" (「御意見無用！ネオス四天王の逆襲！！」, Goikan Muyo! Neosu Shitennō no Gyakushū!!)

- Iczer-3: Cutey Suzuki
- Sister Grey: Sumi Shimamoto
- Nagisa Kasumi: Yuri Shiratori
- Kawai Shizuka: Yuri Amano
- Candy Barts: Emi Shinohara
- Rob Onwa: Masashi Ebara
- Yajin Ro: Tomohiro Nishimura
- Neos Gold: Atsuko Takahata
- Golem: Rihoko Yoshida
- Bigro: Kazuko Yanaga
- Fiber: Mika Doi
- Insect: Urara Takano
- Atros: Minami Takayama
- Ling-Ana: Nobuyuki Furuta
- Iczer-1: Yuriko Yamamoto

== OVA Staff ==
Japanese Staff

- Original Creator: Toshihiro Hirano
- Director: Toshihiro Hirano
- Screenplay: Emu Arii, Toshihiro Hirano, Manabu Nakamura
- Storyboard: Michitaka Kikuchi, Hiroki Hayashi, Masaki Kajishima, Osamu Tsuruyama
- Music: Takashi Kudou
- Character Design: Toshihiro Hirano
- Animation director: Masanori Nishii, Toshihiro Hirano, Hideyuki Motohashi, Chiharu Sato, Hiroyuki Kitazume, Masanori Sakai
- Producer: Jin Maeda, Kinya Watanabe, Satoshi Koizumi
- Design Work: Yasuhiro Moriki
- Key Animation: Keiji Gotoh (eps 1, 4)
- Opening Animation: Atsushi Takeuchi, Masanori Nishii, Michitaka Kikuchi, Narumi Kakinouchi
- Planning: Toshimichi Suzuki`
- Production: Toru Miura

English Staff

- Executive producer: John O'Donnell
- Producer: Stephanie Shalofsky

== OVA Cast ==
- Iczer-3: Cutey Suzuki
- Nagisa Kasumi: Yuri Shiratori
- Atros: Minami Takayama
- Kawai Shizuka: Yuri Amano
- Yajin Ro: Tomohiro Nishimura
- Rob Onwa: Masashi Ebara
- Candy Barts: Emi Shinohara
- Iczer-1: Yuriko Yamamoto
- Iczer-2: Keiko Toda
- Sister Grey: Sumi Shimamoto
- Neos Gold: Atsuko Takahata
- Fiber: Mika Doi
- Insect: Urara Takano
- Bigro: Kazuko Yanaga
- Golem: Rihoko Yoshida
- Other Voices (Episode 1): Hajime Koseki
- Other Voices (Episode 1): Kiyonobu Suzuki
- Other Voices (Episode 1): Kyousei Tsukui

== OVA theme songs ==
Opening:

- -Oath- ICZER-3 ... To You (－誓い－ICZER－3...君と, -Chikai- ICZER-3 ... Kimi to)
  - Lyrics: Keiji Kai
  - Composition: Takashi Kudou
  - Arrangement: Takashi Kudou
  - Artist: Maiko Yoshino

Ending #1:

- New Season
  - Lyrics: Nanami Hayase
  - Composition: Michihiko Oota
  - Arrangement: Michihiko Oota
  - Artist: Nanami Hayase

Ending #2:

- Runaway Heart
  - Lyrics: Nanami Hayase
  - Composition: Haward Killy
  - Arrangement: Michihiko Oota
  - Artist: Nanami Hayase

Ending #3:

- Sweet Communication
  - Lyrics: Nanami Hayase
  - Composition: Michihiko Oota
  - Arrangement: Michihiko Oota
  - Artist: Nanami Hayase

Ending #4:

- Destiny ~The Wind Is Forever~ (Destiny～風はいつまでも～, Destiny ~Kaze wa Itsumademo~)
  - Lyrics: Nanami Hayase
  - Composition: Michihiko Oota
  - Arrangement: Michihiko Oota
  - Artist: Nanami Hayase

Ending #5:

- Revolution
  - Lyrics: Nanami Hayase
  - Composition: Michihiko Oota
  - Arrangement: Michihiko Oota
  - Artist: Nanami Hayase

Ending #6:

- On the Day I See You Again (君にまた逢う日, Kimi ni Mata Au hi)
  - Lyrics: Nanami Hayase
  - Composition: Michihiko Oota
  - Arrangement: Michihiko Oota
  - Artist: Nanami Hayase

Iczer-3 Character Image Song

- I Want To Be An Adult (大人になりたい, Otona ni Naritai)
  - Lyrics: Ryouhei Yamanashi
  - Composition: Ryouhei Yamanashi
  - Arrangement: Masaki Iwamoto
  - Artist: Cutey Suzuki

== Trivia ==
- Iczer-3, Kasumi Nagisa, and Shin Iczer Robo make appearances in the Nintendo DS game Super Robot Taisen L as playable ally units. Atros, Iczer-2 and Neos Gold also make appearances as enemy units (Atros and Iczer-2 become playable allies later in the game). Iczer-3 also has a combination attack with Iczer-1 and Iczer-2.
- In the Sound Novels, Iczer 3's outfit is completely different from the Black and Silver outfit she wears in the Anime OVA, in the Sound Novels, she wears a Red and Blue outfit which bears a striking resemblance to Kikaider suit from the 1972 series Android Kikaider.

== See also ==
- Fight!! Iczer-1
- Iczer Girl Iczelion
