= Iczer Girl Iczelion =

Japanese OVA series

- Iczelion
- Iczelion (OAV)

戦ー少女(イクサーガール) イクセリオン (Ikusā Gāru Ikuzerion)
- Original video animation
- Directed by: Toshiki Hirano
- Written by: Toshiki Hirano
- Music by: Kenji Kawai; Tatsumi Yano
- Studio: AIC
- Licensed by: NA: ADV Films
- Released: January 27, 1995 – March 24, 1995
- Episodes: 2

Iczelion, known in Japan as Iczer Girl Iczerion (戦ー少女 イクセリオン, Ikusā Gāru Ikuzerion), is a 2-episode Japanese original video animation (OVA) series released in 1995. It was created by Toshihiro Hirano, director of the original Fight! Iczer One and Iczer Reborn series. AIC and KSS were the animation production companies in charge of Iczelion. The series was licensed in North America by ADV Films.

Unlike its predecessor, Iczelion did not feature female-female intimacy. Although the series hinted at a possible continuation, none was ever written or created. The story seems to take place in an alternate timeline from Iczer-One and Iczer Reborn because of its placement in modern-day and with a seemingly different Nagisa.

Iczelion was also made into a radio drama series, released as three drama CDs. The radio drama served as a bridge between Iczer-3 and Iczelion, as characters from the Iczer-3 OVA series were featured in it, including Nagisa Kasumi, who became the title Iczelion instead of the OVA's Nagisa Kai. Iczel was also sent to earth by Iczer-3 in the radio drama.

== Story ==
Kai Nagisa, a normal high school girl who wishes to one day become a professional wrestler, is suddenly approached by a robot known as an Iczel. Iczel urges her to help save the Earth from invading aliens called Geas. The Geas, led by Chaos and Cross, are bent on stripping Earth's resources and then destroying it. To fight the invaders, Nagisa must merge with Iczel and become a battle-suited warrior named "Iczelion". She is reluctant to take up this sudden unbelievable task and fight with the other Iczelions of Earth because Nagisa just wants to live a normal life without having such big responsibilities. Nagisa must overcome her fears, together with other Iczelions, and fight to prevent the invading alien forces from destroying their home planet, Earth.

== Characters ==
=== Main characters ===
- Nagisa Kai (甲斐 渚, Kai Nagisa)

Voiced by: Yuri Shiratori (Japanese); Larissa Wolcott (English)
A normal high school student who wishes to become a professional wrestler. One day, a robot named Iczel confronts Nagisa and urges her to help save the world from invading aliens. Although at first, she refused, Nagisa had no choice but to merge with Iczel to become an Iczelion (イクセリオン, Ikuserion). She struggles at first because she does not want to hold the responsibility of being an Iczelion and saving the world, but later realizes that she must protect those she cares about, giving her the strength to become an Iczelion and fight to save the Earth. She can enter Burst Acceleration Mode for a brief period of time.

Weapon: Beamsword, Handbeam, Barrier, Concentrate Fire-Blast.

- Iczel (イクセル, Ikuseru; Iczer in Japanese version)

Voiced by: Masako Nozawa (Japanese); Rebecca Davis (English)
A robot that confronts Nagisa and pleads her to help fight invading aliens that want to destroy the Earth. Iczel chooses Nagisa to become an Iczelion. Nagisa is reluctant in accepting the role but Iczel continuously pleads her to fight to protect her home planet. There are other Iczels on Earth that attend to their own Iczelions; Iczel Black, Iczel Gold, and Iczel Silver. Each Iczel has their own personality, which is similar to that of their Iczelion girl counterpart. Iczel is also referred to as Normal Type by the other Iczels.

Weapon: Barrier.

- Nami Shiina (椎名 なみ, Shiina Nami)

Voiced by: Yumi Touma (Japanese); Claire Hamilton (English)
A rock singer and works as a rave dancer in a nightclub, she is Iczelion Black (ブラックイクセリオン, Burakku Ikuserion). From all the Iczelion, she is the most direct and sure of herself. Her Iczelion signature attacks are gravity based, and she is also the most skilled with both her beam sword and in hand to hand combat. Nami currently seems to be the strongest and most capable of the Iczelions. She seem to have the most defensive and powerful Barrier out of the 4. Can also transfer all the suit power into her beam sword, critically boosting it power to access Gravity Slash.

Weapon: Duel Beamswords, Handbeam, Barrier, Gravity Barrier Ram, Gravity Well, Implode Gravity Vortex.

- Kiiro Iijima (飯島 きいろ, Iijima Kiiro)

Voiced by: Chinami Nishimura (Japanese); Jessica Schwartz (English)
An idol singer, she is Iczelion Gold (ゴールドイクセリオン, Gōrudo Ikuserion). She is very energetic and agile. She tends to mock her opponents in battle but she shows that she is a capable fighter. She is probably the most girlish and enthusiastic of the Iczelion, but that doesn't mean that her fighting skills are weak. She displays one of the broadest range of attacks based on wind and earth. Her wind attacks are deployed by means of the weapon modules mounted on her hips.

Weapon: Barrier, Expanding Barrier Blast, Meteor Shower, Tornado, Tornado Kick, Double Super Tornado.

- Kawai Kawai (河合 可愛, Kawai Kawai)

Voiced by: Yuri Amano (Japanese); Jessica L. Wilson (English)
Another high school girl who attends a different school from Kai Nagisa, she is Iczelion Silver (シルバーイクセリオン, Shirubā Ikuserion). She is not so active like the other Iczelions, but is very calm, gentle and quiet. Kawai is the first to try to persuade Nagisa to fight alongside the other Iczelions and protect the Earth. Kawai is the one who explains why the Iczel were created. While other Iczelion may have their own reasons for fighting, Kawai firmly believes there is nothing more important than defending their home, Earth. Her signature weapons are her Beam Boomerangs. She can also enter Burst Teleport Mode for rapid short-distance evasion.

Weapon: Barrier, single forearm Beam Cutter, Dual Beam Boomerangs.

=== Villains ===
- Cross (クロス, Kurosu)

Voiced by: Akiko Hiramatsu (Japanese); Ellie McBride (English)
One of the main villains in the story. Cross is an android and was probably "created" by Big Gold before she was killed by Iczer-1. With her brother Chaos, she goes to different planets throughout the galaxy, stealing their resources and destroying them. She takes pleasure in killing their inhabitants and hunting down the Iczelion that protect those world. She is usually accompanied by three strong Geas called Voids. Cross seems to be the brawn between herself and her brother. She is eventually killed by Nagisa.

- Chaos (カオス, Kaosu)

Voiced by: Ryo Horikawa (Japanese); Robert Pierson (English)
Another one of the main villains in the story. Chaos is also an android and is the brother of Cross. Together with his sister, they steal planet resources and destroy them afterwards. Chaos seems to be the brains between himself and his sister, commanding his army of Geas to do his bidding.

== Sound Novel Staff ==
Japanese Staff
- Original Work: Toshihiro Hirano
- General Manager: Toshihiro Hirano
- Screenplay: Gaku Nakamura
- Design Work: Yasuhiro Moriki
- Music: Michiaki Watanabe, Tatsumi Yano

== Sound novel theme songs ==
Opening:

- Iczer Girl Iczelion (戦－少女イクセリオン, Ikusā Gāru Ikuserion)
  - Lyrics: Kouichiro Maeda
  - Composition: Tatsumi Yano
  - Arrangement: Tatsumi Yano
  - Artist: Mari Sasaki

Ending:

- Galaxy☆Romance (銀河☆ロマンス, Ginga☆Romansu)
  - Lyrics: Kouichiro Maeda
  - Composition: Tatsumi Yano
  - Arrangement: Tatsumi Yano
  - Artist: Yuri Shiratori

Image Song:

- Dragon Legend (ドラゴン伝説, Doragon Densetsu)
  - Lyrics: Fumiko Okada
  - Composition: Michiaki Watanabe
  - Arrangement: Michiaki Watanabe
  - Artist: Eriko Tsuruzaki

== OVA Staff ==
Japanese Staff

- Director: Toshihiro Hirano
- Music: Kenji Kawai, Tatsumi Yano
- Character Design: Masahiro Nishii, Toshihiro Hirano
- Art director: Hiroshi Kato
- Mechanical design: Keishi Hashimoto
- Director of Photography: Hitoshi Sato
- Animation Supervisor: Keitaro Motonaga
- Design Work: Yasuhiro Morimoto
- Sound director: Hitoshi Matsuoka
- Animation Production: AIC
- Production: KSS

English Staff

- Director: Gary Dehan
- Script: Gary Dehan, Lowell B. Bartholomee
- Art director: Laura Attwell
- Translation: Chris Hutts, Masako Arakawa
- Additional Translation: Chris Hutts, Masako Arakawa
- Editing: Charles Campbell, David Grundy
- Engineer: Charles Campbell
- Executive producer: John Ledford
- International Coordination: Toru Iwakami
- Logo Design: Douglas Smith
- Packaging Design: Lorraine Reyes, Thanh Tran
- Producer: Gary Dehan, Matt Greenfield
- Production Assistant: Akiko Yoshii, Kelly Jean Beard, Maki Nagano, Masami Takahashi
- Production Coordination: Janice Williams
- Production Manager: Lisa J. Miller
- Production Secretary: Anna Bechtol
- Sound Design: Paul Killam
- Subtitle Script: Matt Greenfield

== OVA theme songs ==
Opening:

- Iczer Girl Iczelion (戦－少女イクセリオン, Ikusā Gāru Ikuserion)
  - Lyrics: Kouichiro Maeda
  - Composition: Tatsumi Yano
  - Arrangement: Tatsumi Yano
  - Artist: Mari Sasaki

Ending:

- YOU'RE THE BEST PARTNER!
  - Lyrics: Kouichiro Maeda
  - Composition: Kenji Kawai
  - Arrangement: Tatsumi Yano
  - Artist: Naomi Takahashi

Image Song:

- Life, Very Surely Giving My All (人生、きばってなんぼやねん, Jinsei, Kibatte Nanbo Yanen)
  - Lyrics: Kouichiro Maeda
  - Composition: Kenji Kawai
  - Arrangement: Tatsumi Yano
  - Artist: Naomi Takahashi

Image Song:

- In Love With Lord Peter Gius! (ペテル・ギウスさまに恋をした！, Peteru Giusu-sama ni Koi o shita!)
  - Lyrics: Kouichiro Maeda
  - Composition: Kenji Kawai
  - Arrangement: Kenji Kawai
  - Artist: Chinami Nishimura

== See also ==
- Fight!! Iczer-1
- Adventure! Iczer-3
