= Fight! Iczer One =

Japanese manga series and its adaptations

- Iczer One
- Cover of the first light novel cover featuring titular character Iczer One

戦え!!イクサー1 (Tatakae!! Ikusā Wan)
- Genre: Horror, mecha, yuri
- Manga
- Written by: Aran Rei
- Published by: Kubo Shoten
- Magazine: Lemon People
- Original run: 1983 – 1984
- Volumes: 1
- Original video animation
- Directed by: Toshiki Hirano
- Written by: Toshiki Hirano
- Music by: Michiaki Watanabe
- Studio: AIC
- Licensed by: NA: AnimeWorks
- Released: 19 October 1985 – 4 March 1987
- Episodes: 3

Iczer One, known in Japan as Fight! Iczer-1 (戦え!!イクサー1, Tatakae!! Ikusā Wan), is a 1983 sci-fi horror and yuri manga published in the hentai magazine Lemon People. It was created by Aran Rei. In 1985 the story was adapted into a three-part Original Video Animation directed by Toshihiro Hirano. The story is of an alien invasion of Earth, which is opposed by Iczer-One and her schoolgirl companion Nagisa. Together they can pilot the Iczer-Robo, a giant humanoid robot. The story features strong body horror.

Iczer-1 also featured two "sound novel" dramas released. The first sound novel was released on an LP record and was based on the first volume of the Iczer-1 manga, entitled Golden Warrior Iczer-One. The second drama CD is a crossover with the anime Dangaioh.

== OVA story ==
Earth is attacked by an alien race, known as the Cthulwulf (Note: "Cthulwulf" is a portmanteau of "Cthulhu" and "Beowulf".) (クトゥルフ, Kuturufu). According to their initial strategy, the Cthulwulf use parasitic creatures, called "vedims" (ヴェデム, vedemu), to infest and replace humans across the world. Their hope is to eradicate humanity and take the world without damaging it in an open war. However, Iczer-1 appears and begins rooting out and destroying the vedims. Upon learning this, the Cthulwulf plan to initiate a full military invasion of Earth.

Iczer-1 searches for her "synchronization partner," a human whose sense of loss and anger at the destruction wrought by the aliens will allow her to co-pilot Iczer-1's mecha, the Iczer-Robo (イクサーロボ, Ikusā Robo) and unleash its full weapon capabilities. Ultimately, she chooses Nagisa Kanō, a Japanese schoolgirl, as her partner. No sooner than she makes contact with her, than the Cthulwulf agents begin trying to assassinate her, first at her school, by transforming her classmates into vedims, and later by transforming her parents into another type of parasitic creature, the Delvittse (ディルウェッツェ, Diruvettsue).

Simultaneously, the Cthulwulf pilot, Cobalt, prepares to lead their champion unit, a giant mecha called Delos Theta, against the human military with the ultimate objective of flushing out Iczer-One and destroying her before she can unite with her partner. First the aliens transport in their battle station, a giant black marble pyramid, which appears above the skyline of Tokyo, causing widespread devastation. Then Cobalt launches and begins to destroy the city and all military forces in the area. Iczer-One senses the disturbance and teleports Nagisa and herself into her "other self", the Iczer-Robo, to confront Delos Theta. Initially, the battle fares poorly for Iczer-1, but eventually Nagisa's rage over her parents' murder consumes her, and she triggers, unleashing a huge energy beam that cripples the enemy robot. Nagisa then delivers the final blow herself, killing Cobalt in the process.

The Cthulwulf leader, Sir Violet, responds by developing her own version of Iczer-1, the burgundy-haired Iczer-2, and using the traumatized lover of Cobalt, Sepia, as her partner. In the following days, warfare between activated vedim and human forces, lay waste to most of Earth's civilization, turning the world into a post-apocalyptic wasteland. Nagisa discovers a young girl named Sayoko in the ruins of Japan, tending her unconscious mother. She takes the family into her home, but the mother turns into a vedim, and numerous others begin to teleport into the house. Nagisa uses a bracelet given to her by Iczer-One and is able to protect Sayoko and herself within a force field.

Iczer-1 fights Iczer-2 in a massive battle over the ruins of Japan and is defeated but escapes to regroup with Nagisa and rescue her. Iczer-2 and Sepia arrive in their giant robot, Iczer-Sigma. Iczer-Robo appears, and Nagisa leaves Sayoko with her bracelet before going with Iczer-1 to fight. Again, the battle goes poorly for Iczer-Robo until, in a fit of sadism, Iczer-2 stomps on Sayoko, who has come to watch. Immediately Sepia's morale is broken and Nagisa once again triggers the beam weapon of Iczer-Robo, destroying Iczer Sigma. Iczer-2 barely manages to teleport away before the robot explodes. Sepia chooses not to escape, wanting to be reunited with Cobalt.

Iczer-1 is still badly injured from her fight with Iczer-2, and the two relax in a country meadow to recover. Sayoko is shown to be alive, thanks to Nagisa's bracelet. Iczer-2 retreats to a shadow realm to brood over her defeat before returning with two elite armored vedims, Reddas and Blueba, and abducts Nagisa. Iczer-1 must then single-handedly assault the Cthulwulf fortress to get Nagisa back and kill Big Gold. Meanwhile, Iczer-2 tries to get Nagisa to willingly join her, threatening to otherwise force her. By the time Iczer-1 has reached the chamber where Nagisa is being kept, it is already too late. She has been placed under powerful mind control by Iczer-2, and Iczer-1 is forced to kill her. In dying, however, Nagisa's spirit merges with Iczer-1 and for the first time they fully synchronize. Iczer-1, fueled by Nagisa's sacrifice, defeats Iczer-2 and has her final confrontation with Big Gold. She later fights and kills Iczer-2, who reveals she just wanted a partner like Nagisa.

Big Gold relates that she and Iczer-1 were both created at the same moment, by an ancient alien machine built to grant the desires of its creators. The Matriarch of the Cthulwulf, who would eventually become Sir Violet, had passed within range of the machine just as she exclaimed in despair that her race would die in space and never find a new home. At that moment, Big Gold had appeared to tell her that her wish was granted. She had changed her idyllic society into a fascist nightmare and had mutated the once benign vedim into their current parasitic forms. Big Gold was an embodiment of "Desire" and it had remade the Cthulwulf race. Iczer-1 was the other half of this prophecy. She was "Conscience" and her role was to fulfill the Cthulwulf matriarch's wish and destroy them all on the eve of finding a new home world.

Iczer-1 destroys her. In a final act, using the power of their synchronization and tapping into the ancient wish-granting machine, Iczer-1 is able to restore Earth to the way it was before the Cthulwulf attack. The Cthulwulf fade even from memory and Nagisa is left in the moment where she first appeared in the series, daydreaming and late for school. She briefly runs into Iczer-1 but does not know who she is. After saying farewell, Iczer-1 then leaves the Earth with the Cthulwulf ship to find a new homeworld.

== Characters ==
- Iczer-1 (イクサー1, Ikusā 1)

Voiced by: Yuriko Yamamoto (Japanese); Wendee Swan (English)

- Nagisa Kanou (加納 渚, Kanō Nagisa)

Voiced by: Mayumi Shō (Japanese); Luna Celeste (English)

- Sir Violet (サー・バイオレット, Sā Baioretto)

Voiced by: Sumi Shimamoto (Matriarch), Kaneto Shiozawa (Mind-controlled) (Japanese); Toni Chandler (Matriarch), Sam Strong (Mind-controlled) (English)

- Big Gold (ビッグゴールド, Biggu Gōrudo)

Voiced by: Kaneto Shiozawa (Japanese); Doug Stone (English)

- Cobalt (コバルト, Kobaruto)

Voiced by: Hiroko Emori (Japanese); Maureen O'Connell (English)

- Sepia (セピア, Sepia)

Voiced by: Arisa Andō (Japanese); Bambi Preston (English)

- Iczer-2 (イクサー2, Ikusā 2)

Voiced by: Keiko Toda (Japanese); Mari Devon (English)

- Sayoko (小夜子)

Voiced by: Naoko Watanabe (Japanese); Allison Weintraub (English)

- Mr. and Mrs. Kanō:

Voiced by: Hiroko Fukuzumi (Mrs. Kanō), Yusaku Yara (Mr. Kanō) (Japanese); Lily Browne (Mrs. Kanō), Barry Stigler (Mr. Kanō) (English)

== Theme songs ==
Act I Ending:

- Fight!! Iczer-1 (戦え!!イクサー1, Tatakae!! Ikusā 1)
  - Lyrics: Fumiko Okada
  - Composition: Michiaki Watanabe
  - Arrangement: Michiaki Watanabe
  - Artist: Miki Kakizawa

Act II Ending:

- Never Run Away
  - Lyrics: Fumiko Okada
  - Composition: Michiaki Watanabe
  - Arrangement: Michiaki Watanabe
  - Artist: Yuukou Kusonoki

Act III Ending:

- Eternal Iczer-1 (永遠のイクサー1, Eien no Ikusā 1)
  - Lyrics: Fumiko Okada
  - Composition: Michiaki Watanabe
  - Arrangement: Michiaki Watanabe
  - Artist: Miki Kakizawa

== Release guide ==
Episode 1

- "Fight!! Iczer-1" (「戦え!!イクサー1」, Tatakae!! Ikusā 1)
  - VHS: October 19, 1985
  - Laser Disc: December 4, 1991

Episode 2

- "Fight!! Iczer-1 Act II: Iczer Sigma's Challenge" (「戦え!!イクサー1 ACT II イクサーΣの挑戦」, Tatakae!! Ikusā 1 ACT II: Ikusā Shiguma no Chōsen)
  - VHS: July 23, 1986
  - Laser Disc: January 10, 1992

"Making Of" Special Episode

- "Making Of Iczer1: Daydream" (「MAKING OF ICZER-1 デイドリーム」, Making Of Iczer-1 Deidorīmu)
  - VHS: December 20. 1986

Episode 3

- "Fight!! Iczer-1 Act.III: Concluding Volume" (「戦え!!イクサー1 ACT III 完結編」, Tatakae!! Ikusā 1 Act III: Kanketsu-hen)
  - VHS: March 4, 1987
  - Laser Disc: February 20, 1992

"Movie"

- "Fight!! Iczer-1 Special Compilation" (「戦え!!イクサー1 特別編」, Tatakae!! Ikusā 1 Tokubetsu-hen)
  - VHS: September 25, 1987
  - Laser Disc: September 25, 1987

Laser Disc Box Set

- "Fight!! Iczer-1 Battle Box" (戦え!!イクサー1 バトル・ボックス, Tatakae!! Ikusā 1 Batoru Bokkusu)
  - Laser Disc: May 25, 1998

DVD Release

- "Fight!! Iczer-1 Complete Collection" (戦え!!イクサー1 コンプリート・コレクション, Tatakae!! Ikusā 1 Konpurīto Korekushon)
  - DVD: November 24, 2000

TV broadcast

In 2016, Television Kanagawa aired Fight! Iczer One to celebrate the 30th anniversary of the OVA series. To comply with censorship laws, the nudity was censored with black bars.

== Merchandise ==
In February 2024, Good Smile Company released a non-scale model kit of Iczer Robo as part of their Moderoid line. Hasegawa Corporation released a 1/12 scale non-poseable model kit of Iczer One a month later.

== Video games ==
Iczer-1, Kanou Nagisa, and Iczer Robo make appearances in the Nintendo DS game Super Robot Taisen L for the Nintendo DS as playable ally units. Iczer-2, Iczer-Sigma, and Big Gold also make appearances as enemy units (Iczer-2 and Iczer Sigma become playable allies later in the game). Iczer-1 and Iczer-2 also have a combination attack with Iczer-3. Each of the Iczers alone on foot is comparable in power to two or three Real Robot units, with Iczer Robo and Iczer-Sigma able to match the likes of Mazinger Z and Getter Robo in power.

== Reception ==
The Encyclopedia of Science Fiction described Iczer One as a good and enjoyable, if dated, example of 1980s science fiction horror anime, praising its combination of body horror, graphic violence and dark surrealism. It highlighted the predominantly female cast and the sympathetic portrayal of the alien Cthulhu, despite their association with H. P. Lovecraft's Cthulhu Mythos. The encyclopedia noted that although the pornographic elements of the original manga were removed, the adaptation retained considerable fan service. It considered the animation uneven, suggesting that resources had been concentrated on impressive action sequences at the expense of less important scenes. The review also regarded the two subsequent OVA series, Iczer Reborn and Iczer Girl Iczelion, as unexceptional productions that lacked the original's energy and horror elements.

== See also ==
- Adventure! Iczer-3
- Iczer Girl Iczelion
