= Narumi Kakinouchi =

Japanese manga artist and anime filmmaker

- 垣野内 成美
- Born: March 21, 1962 (age 64); Osaka, Japan
- Occupations: Manga artist; Illustrator; Animator; Director; Character designer; Animation director
- Known for: Vampire Princess Miyu
- Spouse: Toshiki Hirano
- Website: kakinouchi.city.charafre.net

Narumi Kakinouchi (垣野内 成美, Kakinouchi Narumi; born March 21, 1962) is a Japanese manga artist, illustrator, animator, director, character designer, and an animation director.

== Biography ==
Kakinouchi was born in Osaka Prefecture, Japan. After graduating from high school, she began working at Studio Beebo under the direction of Tomonori Kogawa, then moving on to Studio Io, Artland, AIC and other studios where she was an animator, designer, and animation director on many TV series and OVAs. She made her manga and character designer debut with Vampire Princess Miyu.

Kakinouchi made her key animation debut with her work on the 1980 series Space Runaway Ideon. She then garnered great attention as the character designer, storyboard artist, and animation director for the Vampire Princess Miyu OVAs in 1988, and in March of that same year she co-authored the first Vampire Princess Miyu manga, serialized in the mystery/horror monthly manga magazine Susperia.

She made her directorial debut with Ryokunohara Labyrinth in 1990, in addition to being the character designer, scenario creator, storyboard artist, and animation director for the OVA.

In addition to her manga work, as an illustrator she has also done work for a number of books, album covers, a card game, and a cover of the adult manga magazine Lemon People.

After a 16-year hiatus, in 2014 she returned to work as animator, serving as animation director of single episodes of The Pilot's Love Song, Date A Live II, Aldnoah.Zero, Psycho-Pass 2, Shirogane no Ishi Argevollen, Shinmai Maō no Testament, as well as TV episodes and a TV movie of Lupin the Third.

Kakinouchi is married to anime director Toshiki Hirano, with whom she has frequently collaborated on manga and anime projects.

== Anime works ==
=== TV series ===
- Dr. Slump & Arale-chan (key animation, original designs)
- Kimagure Orange Road (original designs, opening and ending animation for episode 1–8)
- Magical Emi, the Magic Star (animation director for episode 34)
- Magical Princess Minky Momo (original designs for episode 10 and 15)
- Ninja Senshi Tobikage (animation director for episodes 25 and 41)
- Pastel Yumi, the Magic Idol (animation director for episode 25)
- Plawres Sanshiro (original designs for episode 28)
- Space Runaway Ideon (key animation)
- The Super Dimension Fortress Macross (original designs (episodes 4, 7, 12, 19, 26, 31, 36), assistant production director (episodes 19, 26))
- Urusei Yatsura (key animation, original designs)
- Vampire Princess Miyu (character designs, original designs, opening animation for episode 25)

=== Films ===
- Crusher Joe (original designs)
- Macross: Do You Remember Love? (assistant animation director)
- Space Runaway Ideon (in-between animation)

=== Original video animations ===
- Cosmos Pink Shock (original designs, animation director)
- Cream Lemon: Don't Do It Mako! Mako Sexy Symphony (original designs, animation director)
- Daimajuu Gekitō Hagane no Oni (original designs)
- Dangaioh (animation director for episodes 1 and 3)
- Fight! Iczer One (original designs, animation director)
- Iczer Reborn (original designs)
- Megazone 23 (original designs, animation director)
- Neko Neko Gensōkyoku (character designs)
- Ryokunohara Labyrinth: Sparkling Phantom (director, character designs, scenario, storyboards, animation director)
- Vampire Princess Miyu (character designs, storyboards, animation director)

== Original works ==
=== Manga ===
- Magic at 3:00pm (午後3時の魔法, Gogo 3ji no Mahō)
- China Blue Jasmine (チャイナ・ブルーJASMINE, Chaina Burū Jasmine)
- Dahlia the Vampire (ダリア ヴァンパイア, Daria Vanpaia)
- Isei Gakuen Elistaers (異星学園エリスターズ, Isei Gakuen Erisutāzu) (with Toshiki Hirano)
- Fairy Jewel
- Juline (格闘小娘JULINE, Kakutō Komusume Juline)
  - Shaolin Sisters (風雲三姉妹LIN³, Fūun Sanshimai Lin³) (sequel)
  - Shaolin Sisters: Reborn (新・風雲三姉妹特LIN, Shin Fūun Sanshimai Toku Lin) (sequel)
- Keep Trust: Shinrai no Kizuna (KEEP TRUST -信頼の絆-)
- Koi Suiren (恋水蓮, Koi Suiren)
- Le Masque (マスク, Masuku)
- Mengenso (面幻想, Mengensō) (with Toshiki Hirano)
- Mermaid Trip (マーメイドトリップ, Mēmaido Torippu) (with Toshiki Hirano)
- Moon Princess (ムーンプリンセス, Mūn Purinsesu)
  - Moon Princess: Red Moon (ムーンプリンセスRED MOON, Mūn Purinsesu Red Moon)
- My Code Name is Charmer (コードネームはCHARMER, Kōdo Nēmu wa Charmer)
- Ruby Blood (ルビー・ブラッド, Rubī Buraddo)
- The Strange Case Files of Ryoko Yakushiji (薬師寺涼子の怪奇事件簿, Yakushiji Ryōko no Kaiki Jikenbo)
- Snow Sugar
- Utahime Fight! (歌姫FIGHT!, Utahime Fight!)
- Vampire Princess Miyu (吸血姫美夕, Vanpaia Miyu)
  - New Vampire Princess Miyu (新・吸血姫美夕, Shin Vanpaia Miyu) (sequel, with Toshiki Hirano)
  - Vampire Princess Yui (吸血姫夕維, Vanpaia Yui) (spin-off)
  - Vampire Princess Yui: Kanonsho (吸血姫夕維・香音抄, Vanpaia Yui Kanonshō)
- The Wanderer
- Wraith Sweeper (レイスイーパー, Reisuīpā)

=== Book illustrations ===
Listed alphabetically by author.

- Kagami no Naka no Atashi e... by Mariko Aihara
- Nagai Nagai Yoru no Mahō by Mariko Aihara
- Saka no Ie no Himitsu by Mariko Aihara
- Ushinawareta Koi no Monogatari by Mariko Aihara
- Yureru Manazashi by Rie Akagi
- Koi Shōjo wa Meitantei by Kae Oda
- Koi Shōjo wa Meitantei 2: I Love You wa Kikoenai by Kae Oda
- Koi Shōjo wa Meitantei 3: Koibito Game by Kae Oda
- Yakushiji Ryōko no Kaiki Jikenbo: Black Spider Island by Yoshiki Tanaka
- Yakushiji Ryōko no Kaiki Jikenbo: Cleopatra no Sōsō by Yoshiki Tanaka
- Yakushiji Ryōko no Kaiki Jikenbo: Matenrō by Yoshiki Tanaka
- Yakushiji Ryōko no Kaiki Jikenbo: Pari Yōtohen by Yoshiki Tanaka
- Yakushiji Ryōko no Kaiki Jikenbo: Tokyo Nightmare by Yoshiki Tanaka
- Angel Eyes: Shōryō Ōkoku by Yūji Watanabe
- Girl by Kei Zushi

== Album cover art ==
- Everything by Fluke Beauty 2007

== Games ==
- Arcus II: Silent Symphony (art director)
- Click Manga: Le Fantôme de l'Opéra (original design, character design)
- Zoku Hatsukoi Monogatari: Shūgaku Ryokō (character design)
