= Kazuko Yanaga =

Japanese actress & voice actress (1947–2014)

- 弥永 和子
- Born: April 14, 1947; Fukuoka, Japan
- Died: November 1, 2014 (aged 67)
- Occupations: Actress; voice actress
- Years active: 1965–2014
- Agent: 81 Produce
- Height: 156 cm (5 ft 1 in)
- Spouse: Hōchū Ōtsuka

Kazuko Yanaga (弥永 和子, Yanaga Kazuko; April 14, 1947 – November 1, 2014) was a Japanese actress and voice actress who worked for 81 Produce. She was the wife of fellow voice actor Hōchū Ōtsuka.

On November 1, 2014, she died of sepsis at the age of 67.

== Filmography ==
=== Anime ===
- Little Lord Fauntleroy (Mrs. Cordette)
- Shin Ace o Nerae! (Ranko Midorikawa)
- Armored Trooper Votoms (Fyana)
- Ashita e Attack (Kyoko)
- Bavi Stock (Roose Mirar)
- Bremen 4: Angels in Hell (movie) (Rondo)
- Crusher Joe (movie) (Norma)
- Cutey Honey (Coral Claw, Crocodile Claw, Great Claw)
- Daimos (Raiza)
- Dream Hunter Rem (Tokiko)
- Final Fantasy: Unlimited (Lisa's Mother)
- Fist of the North Star (Patra)
- Gosick (The Orphan)
- Harlock Saga (Meeme)
- His and Her Circumstances (Eiko Arima (ep.18))
- Iczer Reborn (OVA) (Bigro)
- InuYasha (The Mask of Flesh)
- Kizuoibito (OVA) (Peggy)
- Lupin III: Part II (Anita (ep.31), Kira (ep.46), Nova (ep.114))
- Lupin III: Part III (Anita (ep.41))
- Mirmo! (Teacher)
- Monster (Margott Langer (Fake))
- Pokémon (Kaneyo)
- The Super Dimension Century Orguss (Marian)
- Vampire Hunter D (OVA) (Older Snake Sister)
- Vampire Princess Miyu (Ohshima's wife (ep.3))
- Yu Yu Hakusho (Kuroko Sanada)
- Zone of the Enders (Melinda Gargoyle)

=== Miscellaneous ===
- Kidou Keiji Jiban (Madogarbo)
- Chikyuu Sentai Fiveman (Wandering Swordsman Queen Killer)

=== Video games ===
- Night Trap (Japanese Version) Sheila Martin

=== Dubbing roles ===
==== Live-action ====
- Sigourney Weaver
  - Aliens (1993 TV Asahi edition) (Ellen Ripley)
  - Gorillas in the Mist (1993 TV Asahi edition) (Dian Fossey)
  - Working Girl (1991 TV Asahi edition) (Katharine Parker)
  - Dave (Ellen Mitchell)
  - Copycat (1998 TV Tokyo edition) (Helen Hudson)
  - A Map of the World (Alice Goodwin)
  - Heartbreakers (Max Conners)
  - Baby Mama (Chaffee Bicknell)
  - Avatar (Dr. Grace Augustine)
  - Cedar Rapids (Macy Vanderhei)
  - Paul ("The Big Guy")
  - The Cabin in the Woods (The Director)
- Susan Sarandon
  - The Hunger (Dr. Sarah Roberts)
  - The Client (1997 TV Asahi edition) (Regina "Reggie" Love)
  - Safe Passage (Margaret "Mag" Singer)
  - Earthly Possessions (Charlotte Emory)
  - Noel (Rose Harrison)
  - Shall We Dance? (Beverly Clark)
- Jamie Lee Curtis
  - My Girl (Shelly DeVoto)
  - Forever Young (Claire Cooper)
  - My Girl 2 (Shelly DeVoto)
  - Virus (2002 NTV edition) (Kelly "Kit" Foster)
  - Halloween: Resurrection (Laurie Strode)
- 2010 (1988 TV Asahi edition) (Tanya Kirbuk (Helen Mirren))
- 50/50 (Diane Lerner (Anjelica Huston))
- Absolute Power (Gloria Russell (Judy Davis))
- Albino Alligator (Janet Boudreaux (Faye Dunaway))
- Blood Work (Dr. Bonnie Fox (Anjelica Huston))
- Bringing Down the House (Kate Sanderson (Jean Smart))
- Cagney & Lacey (Det. Mary Beth Lacey (Tyne Daly))
- Casper (Catherine "Carrigan" Crittenden (Cathy Moriarty))
- Choke (Ida Mancini (Anjelica Huston))
- Clear and Present Danger (Dr. Caroline "Cathy" Ryan (Anne Archer))
- Consenting Adults (Priscilla Parker (Mary Elizabeth Mastrantonio))
- Creepshow 2 (Annie Lansing (Lois Chiles))
- Daddy Long Legs (1977 TV Tokyo edition) (Julie Andre (Leslie Caron))
- Death Wish 3 (Kathryn Davis (Deborah Raffin))
- Die Hard (1990 TV Asahi edition) (Holly Gennaro-McClane (Bonnie Bedelia))
- Die Hard 2 (1994 TV Asahi edition) (Holly Gennaro-McClane (Bonnie Bedelia))
- Doubt (Sister Aloysius Beauvier (Meryl Streep))
- Final Analysis (Heather Evans (Kim Basinger))
- Friends (Nora Tyler Bing (Morgan Fairchild))
- The Godfather Part II (1980 NTV edition (Deanna Corleone (Marianna Hill))
- Harry Potter and the Prisoner of Azkaban (Madam Rosmerta (Julie Christie))
- The Hunter (1982 Fuji TV edition) (Dotty (Kathryn Harrold))
- Ignition (Judge Faith Mattis (Lena Olin))
- In the Line of Fire (Lilly Raines (Rene Russo))
- Inkheart (Elinor Loredan (Helen Mirren))
- Internal Affairs (Sergeant Amy Wallace (Laurie Metcalf))
- The Invisible Circus (Gail O'Connor (Blythe Danner))
- Jackie Brown (Jackie Brown (Pam Grier))
- Jurassic Park (Dr. Ellie Sattler (Laura Dern))
- Kindergarten Cop (Detective Phoebe O'Hara (Pamela Reed))
- A Life Less Ordinary (O'Reilly (Holly Hunter))
- The Lucky One (Ellie (Blythe Danner))
- Max Headroom (Theora Jones (Amanda Pays))
- Miami Vice (Gina Navarro Calabrese (Saundra Santiago))
- The Mirror Has Two Faces (Rose Morgan (Barbra Streisand))
- Never Let Me Go (Miss Emily (Charlotte Rampling))
- Nick of Time (Eleanor Grant (Marsha Mason))
- October Sky (Miss Freida J. Riley (Laura Dern))
- On Her Majesty's Secret Service (1979 TBS edition) (Nancy (Catherine Schell))
- Patriot Games (Cathy Ryan (Anne Archer))
- Presumed Innocent (1995 TV Asahi edition (Barbara Sabich (Bonnie Bedelia))
- Regarding Henry (Sarah Turner (Annette Bening))
- Remo Williams: The Adventure Begins (Major Rayner Fleming (Kate Mulgrew))
- The Rose (Mary Rose Foster (Bette Midler))
- Sneakers (Liz (Mary McDonnell))
- Spaceballs (1993 TBS edition) (Commanderette Zircon (Leslie Bevis))
- Superman IV: The Quest for Peace (Lois Lane (Margot Kidder))
- The Temp (Charlene Towne (Faye Dunaway))
- They Live (1990 TV Asahi edition) (Holly Thompson (Meg Foster))
- Tucker: The Man and His Dream (Vera Tucker (Joan Allen))
- The Verdict (1985 TBS edition) (Laura Fischer (Charlotte Rampling))
- West Side Story (1979 TBS edition) (Graziella (Gina Trikonis))
- Wild Things (Sandra Van Ryan (Theresa Russell))
- The Yards (Kitty Olchin (Faye Dunaway))
- Year of the Dragon (1988 TBS edition) (Connie White (Caroline Kava))

==== Animation ====
- The Ant Bully (The Queen Ant)
- Terrahawks (Captain Mary Falconer)
