= Toshiki Hirano =

Japanese anime director, animator and character designer

- 平野 俊貴
- Born: Toshihiro Hirano (平野 俊弘); October 3, 1956 (age 70); Tokyo, Japan
- Occupations: Anime director; animator; character designer
- Notable work: Fight! Iczer One; Vampire Princess Miyu
- Spouse: Narumi Kakinouchi

Toshiki Hirano (平野 俊貴, Hirano Toshiki; born Toshihiro Hirano (平野 俊弘, Hirano Toshihiro), born October 3, 1956, in Tokyo) is a Japanese anime director, animator, and character designer. His wife is a fellow animator and manga artist Narumi Kakinouchi. Some of his works have appeared in the adult manga magazine Lemon People. He is representative of Toshiki Hirano Office Ltd.

== Career ==
While still a student at Tokyo Designer Gakuin College, Hirano began drawing in-betweens for Toei Doga. After working at Studio No.1, Bebo led by Tomonori Kogawa, Studio. Led by himself, Artland led by Noboru Ishiguro, and AIC led by Tōru Miura, he is now the representative of Toshiki Hirano Office Ltd.

In 1982, while working at Artland, Hirano worked as a character animation director on the TV animation series Super Dimension Fortress Macross, which was well received for the female characters' charm and attracted attention from anime fans. Following the theatrical animation Macross: Do You Remember Love? released in 1984, he was selected as a character designer for the OVA Megazone 23 produced by Artland in 1985. In the same year, he also took charge of character design for the TV animation Ninja Senshi Tobikage, and quickly became one of the most popular animators.

His directorial debut OVA Fight! Iczer One was a project that he and his friend Aran Rei brought to Kubo Shoten, and it became a hit that turned into a series. In the latter half of the 1980s, he directed OVAs for enthusiasts such as Dangaioh, Hades Project Zeorymer, and Daimajū Gekitō: Hagane no Oni, and gained a strong fan base.

Since the 1990s, he has been active as an animation director based at Tokyo Movie, where his Devil Lady, which combines elements of tokusatsu, splatter, horror, and action like Iczer One, was well received. He is also one of the original collaborators of his wife Narumi Kakinouchi's representative works, Vampire Princess Miyu series and Fūun San Shimai LIN series.

== Works ==
=== Character designer ===
- Cream Lemon: Don't Do It Mako! Mako Sexy Symphony (OVA)
- Dangaioh
- Fight! Iczer One (OVA)
- Great Dangaioh
- Iczer Reborn (OVA)
- Iczer Girl Iczelion (OVA)
- Megazone 23 (OVA)
- Ninja Senshi Tobikage (TV series)

=== Director ===
- Angel Heart (TV series)
- Apocalypse Zero (OVA)
- Baki (ONA)
- Baki Hanma (ONA)
- Baki Hanma vs. Kengan Ashura (ONA)
- Baki: Most Evil Death Row Convicts (OVA)
- Daimajuu Gekitou Hagane no Oni (OVA)
- Dangaioh (OVA)
- Devil Lady (TV series)
- Fight! Iczer One
- Great Dangaioh (TV series)
- Hades Project Zeorymer (OVA)
- Iczer Reborn (OVA)
- Iczer Girl Iczelion (OVA)
- Kihagane Senjo Rouran (TV series)
- Magic Knight Rayearth
- Vampire Princess Miyu (OVA and TV series)

=== Other ===
- Iczer Girl Iczelion (script (episodes 1–2), storyboards (episodes 1–2)
- Iczer Reborn (Screenplay (episodes 5–6), Episode Director (episode 6), Original creator)
- Macross: Do You Remember Love? (animation director)
- The Super Dimension Fortress Macross (Key Animation (19, Studio Io - OP))
- Urusei Yatsura (Animation Director)
- Sonic X (Storyboards (episodes 32, 38, 44, 50, 53, 63, 68))

=== Manga ===
- Shaolin Sisters (with Narumi Kakinouchi)
  - Shaolin Sisters: Reborn (with Narumi Kakinouchi)
- Vampire Princess Miyu (with Narumi Kakinouchi)
- Golden Warrior Iczer-One
