= Ryokunohara Labyrinth: Sparkling Phantom =

Japanese original video animation (OVA)

緑野原迷宮 〜Sparkling Phantom〜 (Ryokunohara Rabirinsu: Supākuringu Fantomu)
- Genre: Drama
- Original video animation
- Directed by: Narumi Kakinouchi
- Written by: Narumi Kakinouchi
- Studio: AIC; Victor Entertainment
- Released: March 25, 1990
- Runtime: 40 minutes

Ryokunohara Labyrinth: Sparkling Phantom (緑野原迷宮 〜Sparkling Phantom〜, Ryokunohara Rabirinsu: Supākuringu Fantomu; lit. Labyrinth Green Field: Sparkling Phantom) is a Japanese OVA released on March 25, 1990, by AIC and Victor Entertainment and directed by Narumi Kakinouchi.

Based on one of the episodes of Kana Hoshino's manga "Ryokunohara Gakuen Series".

== Plot ==
Hiroki Imanishi and Kanata Tokino are two young guys who have been close friends in all their lives. One dark and stormy night, Hiroki Imanishi leapt in front of a car, saving one young girl's life—and ending his own. The moment he leaves his body, Hiroki is joined by an evil spirit named Fhalei Rue, an evil spirit who takes an interest in Hiroki. Hiroki then realizes that his mortal body is possessed by Fhalei. One night, Kanata sees the spirit of Hiroki and communicates with him, and the next day he asks who the real Hiroki is, to Fhalei (who is inside of Hiroki's body). In a fit of rage, Fhalei attacks Kanata, using Hiroki's body, but she goes back to see who tries to drown, because she did not want to kill anyone. Then, Hiroki (his fleshly body) falls off a cliff and Kanata also because of trying to save the first one. Almost drowning, the two parts of Hiroki (the body and the soul) are transported to a fantasy world where they meet Fhalei. There, they discover that Kanata has a special power (a very strong love for Hiroki, which gives light, thanks to its strong friendship). Fhalei understands that is useless to struggle against Kanata, realizing that Hiroki's light belongs to him. Then she pushes back the time, and Hiroki returns to life after the accident. The spirit goes out of the boys' lives. Their classmates look for them everywhere, until finally they appear safe on the beach. The OVA ends with an embrace between the two main characters, as they used to do when they were little.

== Characters ==
- Hiroki Imanishi (今西弘樹, Imanishi Hiroki) Voiced by: Toshihiko Seki
- Kanata Tokino (時野彼方, Tokino Kanata) Voiced by: Kappei Yamaguchi
- Fhalei Rue (ファーレ・ルウ, Fārei Rū) Voiced by: Kumiko Nishihara
- Olulora Kiriko (霧子オルローワ, Kiriko Orurōwa) Voiced by: Emi Shinohara
- Masayoshi Ijima (飯島正義, Ījima Masayoshi) Voiced by: Kyousei Tsukui
- Shigeru Takahashi (高橋秀一, Takahashi Shigeru) Voiced by: Atsushi Abe
- Fueko Yoshikawa (吉川笛子, Yoshikawa Fueko) Voiced by: Kimura Maki
