= Rihoko Yoshida =

Japanese voice actress

- 吉田 理保子
- Born: January 24, 1949 (age 77); Nerima, Tokyo, Japan
- Occupations: Voice actress; businessperson
- Years active: 1960–1998

Rihoko Yoshida (吉田 理保子, Yoshida Rihoko; born January 24, 1949) is a Japanese businesswoman and a former voice actress. Among her most noteworthy roles are Megu-chan in Majokko Megu-chan, Monsley in Future Boy Conan, Maria Grace Fleed in UFO Robo Grendizer, Michiru in Getter Robo, Klara in Heidi, Girl of the Alps, Rosalie Lamorliere in The Rose of Versailles, Miwa Uzuki in Steel Jeeg, Kurama in Urusei Yatsura, and Machiko in Maicchingu Machiko-sensei. She retired from voice acting in 1998.

== Filmography ==
=== Television animation ===
- Doraemon (1973) as Jamako
- Alps no Shōjo Heidi (1974) as Klara Sesemann
- Urusei Yatsura (1981) as Kurama
- Maicching Machiko-sensei (1981) as Machiko
- Ai Shōjo Pollyanna Monogatari (1986) as Della
- Ozu no Mahōtsukai (1986) as Billina
- City Hunter (1987) as Angel Heart (ep. 25)
- Oishinbo (1991) as Teruko
- GeGeGe no Kitaro (1996)

Unknown date

- Animation Kiko Marco Polo no Boken (xxxx) as Oruje
- Arrow Emblem Grand Prix no Taka (xxxx) as Katori Rie
- Attack on Tomorrow (xxxx) as Asuka Ichijo
- Azuki-chan (xxxx) as Shino
- Blue Seed (xxxx) as Willow Tree (voice of)
- Bosco Daiboken (xxxx) as Damia
- Detective Conan (xxxx) as Eiko (ep 19)
- Conan, the Boy in Future as Monsley
- Cutey Honey (xxxx) as Aki Natsuko "Natchan"
- Cyborg 009 (xxxx) as Mici (ep 2)
- Gatchaman (xxxx)
- Getter Robo (xxxx) as Michiru Saotome
- Getter Robo G (xxxx) as Michiru Saotome
- Goliath the Super Fighter (xxxx) as Kida
- Henbe (xxxx) as Uchiki Youko
- High School! Kimengumi (xxxx) as Sae Uru (2nd Voice); Tetsuko Kitaiwa
- Hyoga Senshi Gaislugger (xxxx) as Reiko Shiki
- Ikkyū-san (xxxx) as Yayoi
- Katri, Girl of the Meadows (xxxx) as Hanna
- Kindaichi Shōnen no Jikenbo (xxxx) as Kahoru Takigawa (ep 7–9)
- Kingyo Chuuihou! (xxxx) as Chitose's mother
- Kotetsu Zieg (xxxx) as Miwa Uzuki
- Kuso Kagaku Sekai Gulliver Boy (xxxx) as Hallelujah / Necromancer
- Kyoryu Wakusei (xxxx) as Rei
- La Seine no Hoshi (xxxx) as Angélique
- Little Prince Cedie (xxxx) as Sarah
- Lucy of the Southern Rainbow (xxxx) as Kate
- Lupin III (xxxx) as Lisa (ep 11)
- Lupin III: Part II (xxxx) as Claudia (ep 133); Margarette (ep 72); Willhelm Briria (ep 102)
- Machine Hayabusa (xxxx) as Sakura Nishionji
- Majokko Megu-chan (1974–1975) as Megu Kanzaki
- Majokko Tickle (xxxx) as Tickle
- Mama wa Shougaku Yonensei (xxxx) as Mirai
- Manga Nihon Emaki (xxxx)
- Mazinger Z (xxxx)
- Meiken Jolie (xxxx)
- Mon Cheri CoCo (xxxx)
- Mori no Tonto-tachi (xxxx) as Elmi
- Musashi no Ken (xxxx) as Kayo Natsuki
- Muu no Hakugei (xxxx) as Madoora
- O-bake no... Holly (xxxx) as Majoline
- Oniisama E... (xxxx) as Hisako Shinobu (Mariko's Mother)
- Oyoneko Boonyan (xxxx) as Arere
- Mobile Police Patlabor (xxxx) as Takayama
- Samurai Giants (xxxx) as Yuki Banjou
- Sentou Mecha Xabungle (xxxx) as Karone (eps 35–37)
- Serendipity Monogatari: Pyua-tou no Nakama-tachi (xxxx) as Minta
- Shinzo Ningen Casshan (xxxx)
- Smart-san (xxxx) as Tamaki
- Steel Jeeg (xxxx) as Miwa Uzuki
- Story of the Alps: My Annette (xxxx) as Marie
- Super Dimension Century Orguss (xxxx) as Tina
- Takarajima (xxxx) as Lily
- The Perrine Story (xxxx)
- The Rose of Versailles (xxxx) as Rosalie
- Time Bokan (xxxx)
- Time Patrol-Tai Otasukeman (xxxx)
- Tonde Mon Pe (xxxx) as Maki Kanou
- Transformers: Masterforce (xxxx) as Mega
- Tsurikichi Sampei (xxxx) as Helen Watson
- Uchuu Kaizoku Captain Harlock (xxxx) as Emeralda
- Uchuu Taitei God Sigma (xxxx) as Minako
- Uchuusen Sagittarius (xxxx)
- Ultraman: The Adventure Begins (xxxx) as Susan
- Umi no Triton (xxxx)
- Wakusei Robo Dangard A (xxxx) as Lisa
- Wansa-kun (xxxx)
- Watashi to Watashi: Futari no Lotte (xxxx) as Mother
- Wedding Peach (xxxx) as Jura
- X-Bomber (Puppet-Show TV) as Bloody Mary
- Yatterman (xxxx)
- Zendaman (xxxx)

=== Original video animation (OVA) ===
- Gall Force 2 - Destruction (xxxx) as Journey
- Gall Force 3 - Stardust War (xxxx) as Journey
- Genesis Survivor Gaiarth (xxxx) as Ayatolla (Ep 3)
- Gude Crest (xxxx) as Holy Supreme Mother
- Hans Christian Andersen's The Little Mermaid (xxxx) as Princess Cecilia
- Iczer Reborn (xxxx) as Golem
- Nayuta (xxxx) as Soz
- Slayers Special (xxxx) as Josephine
- Sohryuden: Legend of the Dragon Kings (xxxx) as Toba Saeko
- Compiler (1994) as Upload

=== Animated films ===
- Nausicaä of the Valley of the Wind (1984) as Girl C; Teto

Unknown date

- Garaga (movie) as Min
- Getter Robo (movie) as Michiru Saotome
- Great Mazinger tai Getter Robo (movie) as Michiru Saotome
- Great Mazinger tai Getter Robo G - Kuuchuu Dai-Gekitotsu (movie) as Michiru Saotome
- Grendizer - Getter Robo G - Great Mazinger Kessen! Daikaijuu (movie) as Michiru Saotome
- Kindaichi Shōnen no Jikenbo (movie) as Saeki
- Lupin III: The Legend of the Gold of Babylon (movie) as Zakskaya
- Mirai Shōnen Conan Tokubetsu Hen-Kyodaiki Gigant no Fukkatsu (movie) as Monsley
- Sailor Moon SuperS: The Movie as Queen Badiane
- UFO Robo Grendizer (movie) as Maria
- Urusei Yatsura: Only You (movie) as Princess Kurama

=== Dubbing ===
==== Live-action ====
- Back to the Future Part III: Clara Clayton (Mary Steenburgen)
- Cliffhanger (1997 NTV edition): Kristel (Caroline Goodall)
- Death and the Maiden: Paulina Escobar (Sigourney Weaver)
- Die Hard (1992 Fuji TV edition): Holly Gennero-McClane (Bonnie Bedelia)
- Die Hard 2 (1992 Fuji TV edition): Holly Gennero-McClane (Bonnie Bedelia)
- Family Business: Elaine McMullen (Rosanna DeSoto)
- Ghostbusters II (1992 Fuji TV edition): Dana Barrett (Sigourney Weaver)
- Indiana Jones and the Temple of Doom: Willie Scott (Kate Capshaw)
- Kramer vs. Kramer: Phyllis Bernard (JoBeth Williams)
- Life with Mikey: Geena Briganti (Cyndi Lauper)
- Look Who's Talking: Mollie Jensen (Kirstie Alley)
- Look Who's Talking Too: Mollie Ubriacco (Kirstie Alley)
- Look Who's Talking Now: Mollie Ubriacco (Kirstie Alley)
- Mars Attacks!: First Lady Marsha Dale (Glenn Close)
- Matilda: Agatha Trunchbull (Pam Ferris)
- Near Dark: Diamondback (Jenette Goldstein)
- Only You (Kate Corvatch (Bonnie Hunt))
- She-Devil: Ruth Patchett (Roseanne Barr)
- Terminator 2: Judgment Day (1993 Fuji TV edition): Sarah Connor (Linda Hamilton)
- Top Gun (1989 Fuji TV edition): Charlotte "Charlie" Blackwood (Kelly McGillis)

==== Animation ====
- Biker Mice from Mars: Charly
- Disney's Adventures of the Gummi Bears: Grammi Gummi
- G.I. Joe: The Movie: Pythona
- Police Academy: Debbie Callahan
- The Rescuers: Madame Medusa
- The Simpsons: Mona Simpson (one episode)
- A Troll in Central Park: Rosie
- X-Men: Storm
