= Yakushiji Ryōko no Kaiki Jikenbo =

Japanese novel series and its franchise

- First novel volume cover, featuring Ryōko Yakushiji

薬師寺涼子の怪奇事件簿
- Novel series
- Written by: Yoshiki Tanaka
- Illustrated by: Narumi Kakinouchi
- Published by: Kodansha
- Original run: October 15, 1996 – December 20, 2018
- Volumes: 11
- Manga
- Written by: Yoshiki Tanaka
- Illustrated by: Narumi Kakinouchi
- Published by: Kodansha
- Imprint: Magazine Z KC (2004–2009); Afternoon KC (2009–2013)
- Magazine: Monthly Magazine Z; (January 26, 2004 – January 26, 2009); Monthly Afternoon; (March 25, 2009 – September 25, 2013)
- Original run: January 26, 2004 – September 25, 2013
- Volumes: 18
- Series titles
- Yakushiji Ryōko no Kaiki Jikenbo; (2004–2009, 11 volumes); Kiri no Hōmonsha; (2009, 2 volumes); Suiyobi ni Goyojin; (2010, 2 volumes); Jyoō Heika no Maneki Neko; (2012, 1 volume); Makyo no Jyoō Heika; (2012–2013, 2 volumes)
- Anime television series
- Directed by: Tarō Iwasaki
- Written by: Hiroyuki Kawasaki
- Studio: Doga Kobo
- Licensed by: NA: RetroCrush
- Original network: tvk; Chiba TV; TV Saitama; Sun TV; Tokyo MX; TV Aichi; KBS; BS11; Kids Station
- Original run: July 6, 2008 – September 28, 2008
- Episodes: 13
- icon

Yakushiji Ryōko no Kaiki Jikenbo (Japanese: 薬師寺涼子の怪奇事件簿; lit. 'Ryōko Yakushiji's Strange Case Files'), known in English as Ryoko's Case File, is a Japanese novel series written by Yoshiki Tanaka and illustrated by Narumi Kakinouchi. It was adapted into manga and an anime television series, two drama CDs had also been released prior to the anime adaptation with different voice actors.

== Plot ==
The series is centered on an elite police officer named Ryōko Yakushiji. A graduate of Tokyo University's Law Faculty, she is currently among the youngest superintendents in the Tokyo Metropolitan Police Department. With the assistance of her subordinate Junichirō Izumida, Ryōko works with her colleagues including her rival and fellow superintendent Yukiko Muromachi, alongside JACES security forces personnel and her personal maids Lucienne and Marianne, to investigate and resolve seemingly paranormal, supernatural or bizarre events that become involved in criminal cases—particularly when police procedures or modern science cannot be applied—before they go out of hand.

Because the novels, manga and the anime adaptations have different stories, paranormal events and creatures involved, their central plots are most of the time different from each other. (Note: Some of the storylines in the manga serialization are based on the novels, such as the Matenrou arc.)

=== Organizations ===
==== JACES ====
Owned by the Yakushiji family, it's a security company that ex-police officers both enlisted and high-ranking are employed into after their retirement. JACES is well known as one of Asia's best security companies, with its main headquarters located in Akasaka-mitsuke. The company's official slogan is "Safety". Its personnel use gray for their uniform color.

In combat operations, they use PASGT ballistic helmets, gray BDUs, tactical vests and light to medium body armor. JACES personnel are armed with expandable baton sticks when they encounter unarmed people.

Its origins are traced back to the end of World War II when the "Japanese Empire Security Service" (大日本警備保障, Dai Nihon Keibi Hoshō) was established before it became JACES, which was supposed to be used for the basis of a restructured Japanese military before Ruriko went to create the JPP instead. The novel mentions that has branch offices in France and in the US.

==== Japan Private Police ====
Known as the "Nippon Private Police" (日本私用警察, Nihon shiyo keisatsu), (Note: The JPP is also known as the Japanese Private Police, as mentioned by Ryoko in the episode "Okinawa, Kounoshima") it was founded by ex-Diet member Ryojun Tadomura and heavily funded by the Government of Japan to counter the influence of JACES in the domestic and international security market. They are known to be hired in war-torn countries after military forces are pulled back, conducting police duties in their place. JPP personnel are also hired as private security guards. JPP uses green as its color as evident in their uniforms. Unlike JACES, where most of its manpower comes from ex-law enforcement personnel, JPP recruits its personnel mostly from ex-SDF personnel.

During combat operations, JPP personnel are identified with green heavy body armor, anti-riot helmets and are armed with mostly Howa Type 89 assault rifles, Heckler & Koch MP5 and Minebea PM-9 submachine guns with expandable baton sticks. In normal operations, JPP personnel operate as private guards and sometimes, deploy robot droids to help them conduct searches and patrols with/for them.

It does not appear in the original novel and manga version.

==== Shiba ====
Located in the Greater Tokyo Area, Shiba (芝) is said to house several departments of the Tokyo Metropolitan Police Department that operate under secret circumstances for covert missions.

It takes its name from the Shiba district of Tokyo's Minato ward. It does not appear in the original novel and manga version.

== Characters ==
Protagonists of Yakushiji Ryōko no Kaiki Jikenbo. From left to right: Assistant Inspector Junichirō Izumida, Superintendent Ryōko Yakushiji, Superintendent Yukiko Muromachi and Assistant Inspector Akira Kishimoto.

=== Main ===
Ryōko Yakushiji (薬師寺 涼子, Yakushiji Ryōko)
Voiced by: Hitomi Nabatame (TV)
Voiced by: Tomoko Kawakami (Drama CD)
A 27-year-old officer, holding the rank of Superintendent, in the Tokyo Metropolitan Police Department's Criminal Investigation Bureau, she graduated from Tokyo University's Law Faculty. She is quite skilled in armed and unarmed combat and tends to attack head-on, with or without backup. Attractive, haughty, and fashionable, she has never been seen wearing the same clothes twice. She also speaks French aside from her native Japanese, which made her the primary candidate for an assignment in France under INTERPOL.
She has a romantic interest in her subordinate, Assistant Inspector Junichiro Izumida, and often shows it through her actions such as taking him along with her wherever she goes, finding ways to spend time with him even during his day off and sometimes asking him to spend the night at her place. But he is generally too naive to notice it.
Her grandfather, Masamoto Yakushiji, was the founder of the Japanese Empire Security Service, which was the predecessor to JACES - now a multinational security company - currently headed by her father, Hiroki Yakushiji. As his successor, Ryōko does not hesitate to use its assets if necessary to help her in her work. She has an older sister named Kinuko Yakushiji.
Because police officers go to JACES after they retire under amakudari, her colleagues in the police force do not dare oppose her in fear that they will have no job after they leave the police. To top it all, Ryoko knows the dirty secrets of high-ranking government officials and so they are afraid to cross her. Most of the police officers, high-ranking government officials and media practitioners fear not only her influence and power but her personality as well.
Her rival, and fellow Superintendent, Yukiko Muromachi calls her Oryo.
The novels state that Ryoko is fluent in English, Italian, Portuguese, Spanish and Latin.
Junichirō Izumida (泉田 準一郎, Izumida Junichirō)
Voiced by: Hidenobu Kiuchi (TV)
Voiced by: Kazuhiko Inoue (Drama CD)
A 33-year-old non-career officer, holding the rank of Assistant Inspector, in the Tokyo Metropolitan Police Department's Criminal Investigation Bureau. After graduating from what he considers an average university, he started out as a uniformed police officer. He was previously with the 1st division of the Criminal Investigation Bureau prior to his reassignment to Superintendent Ryōko Yakushiji. Izumida acts as her assistant.
He is very submissive, perhaps as a result of always being around Ryoko, but can also be assertive and aggressive when the situation calls for it. Junichiro is often caring and kind to the people close to him, always watching over his superior Ryōko and her rival Yukiko. He is quite oblivious to Ryōko's infatuation and her efforts to get his attention. Like his superior, Izumida is also quite skilled in armed and unarmed combat.
Though he is usually on the receiving end of Ryoko's oppressive personality, he remains loyal to her and tries his best to protect her.
He is also the narrator of the entire series.
Yukiko Muromachi (室町 由紀子, Muromachi Yukiko)
Voiced by: Hōko Kuwashima (TV)
Voiced by: Yuriko Fuchizaki (Drama CD)
A 27-year-old officer, holding the rank of Superintendent, in the Tokyo Metropolitan Police Department's Security Bureau. Ryōko calls her "Oyuki". Equally attractive and intelligent, their rivalry goes all the way back to their days in college and they never miss an opportunity to verbally antagonize each other. An epitome of decorum, Ryōko usually leaves her in charge of diffusing tense situations as well as press interviews.
Prior to her current assignment, Muromachi was assigned to a position in the Cabinet Intelligence and Research Office.
Although she is the daughter of an influential former police officer, her sense of justice prevents her from using her family ties in carrying out her duties. Her subordinate is Akira Kishimoto.
Akira Kishimoto (岸本 明, Kishimoto Akira)
Voiced by: Kenji Nojima (TV)
Voiced by: Yūji Ueda (Drama CD)
A 23-year-old career officer, holding the rank of Assistant Inspector under Muromachi, he is an anime and manga otaku who looks up to Ryōko.
Kishimoto's a fan of the show "Leotard Warrior Run".

=== Allies ===
Subordinates of Ryōko Yakushiji. From left to right: Mario Abe, Maruoka and Satomi Kaizuka.

Lucienne and Marianne.

Satomi Kaizuka (貝塚 さとみ, Kaizuka Satomi)
Voiced by: Misato Fukuen
A uniformed officer in the Tokyo Metropolitan Police Department, she is responsible for mostly handling clerical works under Ryōko. She is 21 years old.
Mario Abe (阿部 真理夫, Abe Mario)
Voiced by: Otoya Kawano
A colleague of Ryōko and Izumida's and a uniformed officer alongside Satomi. He is 29 years old.
Maruoka (丸岡)
Voiced by: Minoru Inaba (TV)
Voiced by: Takkō Ishimori (Drama CD)
An old man who is a detective under Ryoko with the rank of Inspector. He is 50 years old.
Lucienne (リュシエンヌ)
Voiced by: Christelle Ciari
One of Ryōko's maids from France. A blonde-haired girl, she is an expert in hacking though she can handle firearms. She usually looks after the Yakushiji residence in France.
Marianne (マリアンヌ)
Voiced by: Satomi Satō
Another of Ryōko's maids from France. A short black-haired girl, she is an expert in handling all kinds of small arms. She usually looks after the Yakushiji residence in France.

=== Yakushiji Family ===
Kinuko Yakushiji (薬師寺 絹子, Yakushiji Kinuko)
Voiced by: Mie Sonozaki
An older sister of Ryoko's. Ryōko calls her Okinu. She's 29 years old.
Hiroki Yakushiji (薬師寺 弘毅, Yakushiji Hiroki)
Father of Ryoko and Kinuko. Nothing is known about him, except that he is the head of the JACES security company and an ex-MPD high-ranking officer. He is 60 years old.
Masamoto Yakushiji (薬師寺 正基, Yakushiji Masamoto)
Voiced by: Atsushi Ono
The main founder of the Japanese Empire Security Service, known as JACES in modern times, and grandfather of Kinuko and Ryoko Yakushiji.

=== Antagonists ===
Ruriko Isurugi (石動 瑠璃子, Isurugi Ruriko)
Voiced by: Sumi Shimamoto
A woman who has influence within Shiba. She appears to know Ryoko on a personal basis. She is also the true head of the Japan Private Police. Ruriko is seemingly ageless, having been alive after through World War II and was a co-founder of the Japanese Empire Security Service with Ryoko's grandfather Masamoto Yakushiji before she diverged and created JPP originally with the intent of reestablishing a "true" Japanese military using a security company as a cover.
She is not in the original novel.
Kazuma Nonagase (野長瀬 一馬, Nonagase Kazuma)
Voiced by: Daisuke Hirakawa
An aide to Ryoko in JACES, he is also a double agent working on behalf of JPP.
He is not in the original novel.

=== Others ===
Monami (もなみ)
Voiced by: Hitomi Nabatame
A perfect and successful result of the third attempt to clone Ryōko Yakushiji, using her DNA, by employing Hangon and modern cloning procedures. Ruriko tried to use her in the scheme to take control of JACES away from the entire Yakushiji family by capitalizing on her feelings for Junichirō. Over time, she decides to switch over to Ryōko's side because of those feelings. Her name, which means "My friend" in French (mon ami), is given by Ryōko after Junichiro misunderstands Marianne and Lucienne's pronunciation. She is known to the JPP as R-9.
At the end of the anime series, she is found to be under Ryōko's custody and even has Marianne and Lucienne keep an eye on her while going to a school in France. She is not in the original novel.

=== Rogues ===
The following are rogues monsters/creatures that have appeared in the anime:

Giant Snake
Making its appearance in the Babylon building in Ginza, its great size was achieved by having it ingest various growth hormones. It died when the building was destroyed in an explosion.
Wisps
It's not known how they first appeared, but they showed up in the digital copies of the journalists' pictures of Yakushiji and Izumida.
Unknown Alpha Human
Created in an illegal experiment by combining human cells with DNA of an unknown prehistoric human. The monster that killed several yakuza assassins before it died of rapid cell degeneration.
Centipede Robot
A counter-terrorist robot created by the JPP, it went berserk after its defense systems, that recognizes anyone with a dangerous object as an enemy, was altered in a traffic accident. Ryoko defeats it by shooting its main sensor. It was later used by the JPP in trying to eliminate Ryoko and Junichiro.
Mutant Mangrove Seeds
Said to have been created through secret experiments of JPP scientists, they were able to possess and control Ryojun Tadomura and a faction of the JPP before Marianne destroys the mutant mangrove tree with napalm grenades. They were later used again in the attempt to take Yakushiji down.
Unknown Cricket
Discovered by an unknown person, this species has the ability to resonate sound waves that are equal or greater than the sound waves on cellphones. The sound evokes terrible memories in the target, making them commit suicide.

== Media ==
=== Novel ===
The novel series first started in 1996 with 11 volumes in circulation. Kodansha has the publication rights on the series and published all bunkobon editions, but other publishers also published some volumes borrowing the rights by Kodansha.

==== Novel volumes ====
The following have been published as part of the novels written by Dr. Yoshiki Tanaka:

Japanese title	English title	Year	First publisher	ISBN
Matenrō (魔天楼)	Demon Skyscraper	1996	Kodansha Bunko	4-06-263346-9
Tōkyō Naitomea (東京ナイトメア)	Tokyo Nightmare	1998	Kodansha Novels	4-06-182042-7
Pari Yōto-hen (巴里・妖都変)	Paris, The Strange Attractive Capital	2000	Kobunsha Kappa Novels	4-334-07371-9
Kureopatora no Sōsō (クレオパトラの葬送)	Funeral of the Cleopatra	2001	Kodansha Novels	4-06-182197-0
Kuro Kumo Shima (黒蜘蛛島)	Black Spider Island	2003	Kobunsha Kappa Novels	4-334-07541-X
Yakōkyoku (夜光曲)	Luminous Song	2005	Shodensha Non-Novels	4-396-20793-X
Kiri no Hōmonsha (霧の訪問者)	Visitor's Fog	2006	Kodansha Novels	4-06-182499-6
Suiyō-bi ni Goyōjin (水妖日にご用心)	Be Careful on Wednesday	2007	Shodensha Non-Novels	978-4-396-20840-0
Makyō no Joōheika (魔境の女王陛下)	The Queen of Makyo	2012	Kodansha Novels	978-4-06-182811-7
Umi kara Nanika ga Yattekuru (海から何かがやってくる)	Something is Coming From the Sea	2015	Shodensha Non-Novels	978-4-396-21024-3
Hakuma no Kurisumasu (白魔のクリスマス)	White Demon's Christmas	2018	Shodensha Non-Novels	978-4-396-21044-1

=== Audio book ===
Since 2015, the novels are adapted into audio books by Kikubon. They are narrated by Afumi Hashi.

=== Drama CD ===
Two drama CDs were put on the market by Avex in 1999 (Tokyo Nightmare) and 2001 (Matenrō). The cast was different from the later anime version.

=== Manga ===
Fourth tankōbon volume cover of the manga Yakushiji Ryōko no Kaiki Jikenbo

The manga debuted in Kodansha's seinen manga magazine Monthly Magazine Z on January 26, 2004, in the March 2004 issue. Its chapters were collected into eleven tankōbon volumes, released from July 23, 2004, to January 23, 2009.

After Monthly Magazine Z ceased publication with its final issue on January 26, 2009, the series was transferred to Kodansha's seinen manga magazine Monthly Afternoon. The series began in the May 2009 issue of the magazine, published on March 25, 2009, and was renamed Yakushiji Ryōko no Kaiki Jikenbo: Kiri no Hōmonsha (薬師寺涼子の怪奇事件簿 霧の訪問者). The series finished in the January 2010 issue of the magazine, released on November 25, 2009. It was compiled into two volumes, published on September 23, 2009, and January 22, 2010.

A third series, titled Yakushiji Ryōko no Kaiki Jikenbo: Suiyobi ni Goyojin (薬師寺涼子の怪奇事件簿 水妖日にご用心), started in the March 2010 issue of Monthly Afternoon, published on January 25, 2010. The series finished in the November 2010 issue of the magazine, published on September 25, 2010. Two volumes released on June 23, 2010, and November 22, 2010.

A fourth series, titled Yakushiji Ryōko no Kaiki Jikenbo: Jyoō Heika no Maneki Neko (薬師寺涼子の怪奇事件簿 女王陛下の招き猫) was serialized in Monthly Afternoon from the October 2012 issue, published on August 25, 2012, to the January 2013 issue, published on November 24, 2012. A compiled volume was released on January 23, 2013.

A fifth series, titled Yakushiji Ryōko no Kaiki Jikenbo: Makyo no Jyoō Heika (薬師寺涼子の怪奇事件簿 魔境の女王陛下) was serialized in Monthly Afternoon from the February 2013 issue, published on December 25, 2012, to the November 2013 issue, published on September 25, 2013. Two volumes were published on May 23 and November 22, 2013.

A spin-off manga was also created by Yoshiki Tanaka and Narumi Kakinouchi, titled SP Yakushiji Ryōko no Kaiki Jikenbo Tanpenshū (SP 薬師寺涼子の怪奇事件簿 短編集), compiled in three volumes, released from June 17, 2008, to November 22, 2011.

In Taiwan, it has been published by Sharp Point Press.

==== Manga volumes ====
No.	Japanese title	English title	Release date	ISBN
Yakushiji Ryōko no Kaiki Jikenbo
1	Matenrō (魔天楼)	Demon Skyscraper	July 23, 2004	978-4-06-349176-0
2	Tōkyō Naitomea (Zenpen) (東京ナイトメア (前編))	Tokyo Nightmare (Part 1)	January 21, 2005	978-4-06-349193-7
3	Tōkyō Naitomea (Kōhen) (東京ナイトメア (後編))	Tokyo Nightmare (Part 2)	May 23, 2005	978-4-06-349203-3
4	Pari Yōto-hen (Zenpen) (巴里・妖都変 (前編))	Paris, The Strange Attractive Capital (Part 1)	November 22, 2005	978-4-06-349225-5
5	Pari Yōto-hen (Kōhen) (巴里・妖都変 (後編))	Paris, The Strange Attractive Capital (Part 2)	June 23, 2006	978-4-06-349240-8
6	Kureopatora no Sōsō (Zenpen) (クレオパトラの葬送 (前編))	Funeral of the Cleopatra (Part 1)	September 22, 2006	978-4-06-349259-0
7	Kureopatora no Sōsō (Kōhen) (クレオパトラの葬送 (後編))	Funeral of the Cleopatra (Part 2)	February 23, 2007	978-4-06-349272-9
8	Kuro Kumo Shima (Zenpen) (黒蜘蛛島 (前編))	Black Spider Island (Part 1)	August 23, 2007	978-4-06-349301-6
9	Kuro Kumo Shima (Kōhen) (黒蜘蛛島 (後編))	Black Spider Island (Part 2)	January 23, 2008	978-4-06-349328-3
10	Yakōkyoku (Zenpen) (夜光曲 (前編))	Luminous Song (Part 1)	August 22, 2008	978-4-06-349374-0
11	Yakōkyoku (Kōhen) (夜光曲 (後編))	Luminous Song (Part 2)	January 23, 2009	978-4-06-349407-5
Kiri no Hōmonsha
12	Kiri no Hōmonsha (Jō) (霧の訪問者 (上))	—	September 23, 2009	978-4-06-314599-1
13	Kiri no Hōmonsha (Ge) (霧の訪問者 (下))	—	January 22, 2010	978-4-06-310621-3
Suiyobi ni Goyojin
14	Suiyobi ni Goyojin (Jō) (水妖日にご用心 (上))	—	June 23, 2010	978-4-06-310676-3
15	Suiyobi ni Goyojin (Ge) (水妖日にご用心 (下))	—	November 22, 2010	978-4-06-310712-8
Jyoō Heika no Maneki Neko
16	Jyoō Heika no Maneki Neko (女王陛下の招き猫)	—	January 23, 2013	978-4-06-387865-3
Makyo no Jyoō Heika
17	Makyo no Jyoō Heika (Jō) (魔境の女王陛下 (上))	—	May 23, 2013	978-4-06-387889-9
18	Makyo no Jyoō Heika (Ge) (魔境の女王陛下 (下))	—	November 22, 2013	978-4-06-387940-7

=== Artbook ===
An artbook released with drawings related to the manga series called Flawless Yakushiji Ryōko no Kaiki Jikenbo Irasuto-shū (Flawless 薬師寺涼子の怪奇事件簿イラスト集; lit. 'Flawless Ryōko Yakushiji's Strange Case Files Illustrations') was released by Kodansha on August 28, 2006.

=== Anime ===
A 13-episode anime television series adaptation was broadcast from July 6 to September 28, 2008, (Note: Yakushiji Ryōko no Kaiki Jikenbo originally aired on TVK on Saturday 24:30, effectively Sunday at 12:30 a.m. JST.) with animation done by Doga Kobo. It aired on BS11 Digital, Chiba TV, KBS Kyoto, Sun TV, Tokyo MX, TV Aichi, Television Saitama and TVK television stations. The opening theme is Thème principal by KATSU (angela). The ending themes are various through series: À demain sur la lune (#1,3), Ryoko 2 (#2,6), Songe d'une nuit d'été (#4,7,9,10,12), La Vie en rose (#5), Le combat (#8,11) by KATSU (angela), and Thème principal La chanson d'atsuko (#13) by atsuko (voice) and KATSU (music). The series was released on 3 DVDs from September 26, 2008, to January 21, 2009. It was also available via broadband access streaming.

The series began streaming in North America on RetroCrush as an exclusive title on November 5, 2021, under the name Ryoko's Case File.

=== Soundtracks ===
A BGM OST, Volume 1 with music from the show was released on June 4, 2008, with 8 tracks. The second volume had been released on August 6, 2008, with 17 tracks with a third OST on September 10, 2008, with 13 tracks. All three OSTs have the title Le recueil des faits improbables de Ryōko Yakushiji, which is the show's title in French, and the most of composition are also named in French.

== Reception ==
Dengeki Online placed Yakushiji Ryōko no Kaiki Jikenbo on 7th place out of 10 news weekly events for June 1, 2008.
