= Daimajū Gekitō: Hagane no Oni =

1987 Japanese original video animation

- Home release media cover art for the Japanese OVA film Daimajū Gekitō: Hagane no Oni

大魔獣激闘 ~鋼の鬼~
- Original video animation
- Directed by: Toshiki Hirano
- Written by: Shō Aikawa
- Music by: Masahiro Kawasaki
- Studio: AIC
- Released: December 10, 1987
- Runtime: 60 minutes

Daimajū Gekitō: Hagane no Oni (大魔獣激闘 ~鋼の鬼~; lit. Fierce Battle of Colossal Beasts: Steel Devil) is a 1987 Japanese original video animation. Directed by Toshiki Hirano, with screenplay by Shō Aikawa, mechanical design by Koichi Ohata and animation direction by Masami Ōbari. The plot is that of Takuya who visits a research center to meet an old friend, and their mutual connection with an experiment that was conducted three years earlier in 1984.

== Plot ==
Takuya and Haruka are manning a submersible during an experiment on a new laser weapon. After firing the laser from a satellite, a stranger creature appears. They are ordered to take a sample. Three years later in 1987, Takuya gets a letter from Haruka to visit him at a research center. Haruka says that nothing is wrong and that he sent no letter. Rui, a girl who works at the center says that Haruka has been acting very strange lately, and isolates himself in the lab for weeks. Later, a radar center is completely destroyed by another mysterious creature.

Takuya, attempts to figure out the mystery. He breaks into the director's lab with the help of a friend and examines files relating to Haruka's research. In the files, Haruka discusses how the laser likely opens a portal to another dimension. The military then storms the base and takes it over. Haruka calls Takuya to meet him. There he explains that he created a dimensional transfer canon, which summoned another demonic creature, which fused with the canon. Soldiers then arrive to arrest Haruka, but Haruka fuses with the giant demonic creature named Ika Oni. He then destroys most of the research center. During the escape, Lyse is killed.

In an attempt to control the situation, the center's director orders the military to fire the laser canon on the island. It fails to destroy the creature. Takuya then pilots another giant demonic creature from the ocean named Hagane and does battle with Haruka's creature. He destroys Haruka's creature. The force of its destruction destroys most of the island. The OVA ends with Takuya awakening on debris floating in water.

== Voice actors ==
- Toshio Furukawa - Takuya Gozoru
- Kazuhiko Inoue - Haruka Affodo
- Sakiko Tamagawa - Rui

== Release ==
The OVA was produced by AIC and released by Tokuma Japan Communications in Japan on December 10, 1987. The OVA also released in Italy and Spain.

== Reception ==
The Encyclopedia of Science Fiction considered Daimajū Gekitō: Hagane no Oni an uneven anime, describing its animation as generally functional but noting that it improves considerably during battles and scenes of destruction, with occasional interesting backgrounds. It regarded the partially organic, human-linked mecha as a potentially interesting concept that would have benefited from further exploration of their nature and origins. The encyclopedia identified characterization and voice performances as the work's principal weaknesses, describing Takuya as petulant and charmless and criticizing Galun's exaggerated presentation as a villain. It also criticized the limited roles given to Rui and Lyse and the casual treatment of their deaths, particularly Lyse's.
