= Attack on Tomorrow! =

Japanese anime television series

- Screenshot
- あしたへアタック！
- Genre: Sports, drama
- Created by: Shiro Jimbo
- Written by: Eiji Okabe
- Directed by: Fumio Kurokawa
- Music by: Nobuyoshi Koshibe
- Country of origin: Japan
- Original language: Japanese
- No. of episodes: 23

Production
- Executive producer: Koichi Motohashi
- Producer: Takaji Matsudo
- Production companies: Nippon Animation; Fuji Television

Original release
- Network: FNS (Fuji TV)
- Release: April 4 – September 5, 1977

Attack on Tomorrow! (あしたへアタック！, Ashita e Atakku!) is an anime series that aired in 1977 in Japan. There were 23 episodes aired, each with a runtime of 25 minutes. In Europe, it is also known as Smash (French) and Mimì e le ragazze della pallavolo (Italian).

It is often mistakenly believed to be a spin-off of the earlier and more popular series Attack No. 1 (1969–1971), due in part to the involvement of several staffers (including directors Kurokawa and Okabe and writer Yamazaki) who had worked on the prior series. It is not an official spin-off, and is more likely to have been inspired by the popularity of Attack No. 1.

== Plot summary ==
The story is about Mimi Hijiiri, a student with just one school year remaining, who decides to revitalize a volleyball team low on morale from the death of one of its team members from an accident.

== Concept ==
Attack on Tomorrow! was strictly created as a tribute to the gold medal the Japanese women's volleyball team earned in the 1976 Olympics.

== Staff ==
- Directed by: Fumio Kurokawa
- Series composition: Eiji Okabe
- Screenwriter: Haruya Yamazaki
- Produced by: Kôichi Motohashi
- Producer: Ryûji Matsudo
- Creator: Shiro Jinbo
- Music: Nobuyoshi Koshibe
- Cast: Mami Koyama (Mimi Hijiri), Kaoru Kurusu (Rouki Sei), Kazue Komiya (Yukari Sugihara), Keiko Yokozawa (Sumie Nishii), Rihoko Yoshida (Asuka Ichijou) etc.

== Reaction ==
Although the show was broadcast in the European market in the 1980s in countries such as France and Italy, the plot and concept were too similar to its predecessor Attack No. 1 and ratings were low. The show ceased production after only 23 episodes.

== Trivia ==
- In the French version "Smash", Mimi is Virginia Tessier. In the Italian dub, she is Mimí Miceri and she is half-Japanese and half Italian. In both languages, most of the other character names were changed as well.
  - In the Italian dub, Mimi shares her name with the main character of Attack Number 1 Kozue Ayuhara, known in Italy as Mimí Ayuhara.
- Mitsuko Horie performed both the opening and ending theme songs in the original Japanese version.
