= Dangaioh =

Japanese anime OVA series

- Hyper Combat Unit Dangaioh
- Cover for the Blu-ray remaster release in Japan

破邪大星ダンガイオー (Haja Taisei Dangaiō)
- Original video animation
- Directed by: Toshiki Hirano
- Written by: Koichi Ohata; Shō Aikawa; Toshiki Hirano
- Music by: Chumei Watanabe; Tatsuyuki Ōhara; Kaoru Mizutani
- Studio: AIC & Artmic (Note: Not credited in episode 1.)
- Licensed by: AUS: Madman Entertainment; UK: Manga Entertainment; US: U.S. Renditions
- Released: September 28, 1987 – July 25, 1989
- Runtime: 43 minutes (ep. 1); 27 minutes (ep. 2); 38 minutes (ep. 3)
- Episodes: 3
- Manga

Muteki Shōjo Ramii
- Written by: Ken Ishikawa
- Illustrated by: Toshihiro Hirano
- Published by: Tokuma Shoten
- Published: July 1989
- Volumes: 1
- Video game
- Developer: Technopolis Software
- Publisher: Technopolis Software
- Genre: Adventure
- Platform: PC-8801
- Released: April 1990
- icon

Hyper Combat Unit Dangaioh (破邪大星ダンガイオー, Haja Taisei Dangaiō) is a Japanese anime OVA series produced and animated by AIC and Artmic and released in Japan in 1987. Dangaioh featured character designs by creator Toshiki Hirano, mechanical designs by Shoji Kawamori, and animation direction by Masami Ōbari.

== Plot ==
Four powerful psychic warriors Mia Alice, Lamba Nom, Pai Thunder, and Roll Kran, are brought together by the mysterious Dr. Tarsan. They can unite four powerful planes to form Dangaioh (ダンガイオー/彈劾凰, Dangaiō): the most powerful weapon in the (fictional) universe. Using their combined psionic force, the Dangaioh team alone can stop the bloody tyranny of Captain Galimos and Gil Berg.

The team hopes their psychogenic wave will be strong enough to destroy Galimos's evil henchman, the notorious Gil Berg, who has sworn by the taking of his right eye to utterly destroy the Dangaioh Team. Along with the threat of Gil Berg, the Dangaioh Team must also avoid falling foul of Galimos's trickery, which finds weakness in their forgotten pasts.

== Characters ==
=== Main characters ===
Mia Alice (ミア・アリス, Mia Arisu)
Voiced by: Mayumi Shō (Japanese); Anne Marie Zola (English)
A young girl who possesses telekinesis, but is reluctant to use violence during combat. Nevertheless, her powers activate instinctively when she or her teammates face imminent death. Mia is originally from Earth, but unlike her teammates, she has no complete recollection of her memory. Because of this, she decides to stay with the Dangaioh team instead of returning to Earth when she has the chance. Mia pilots Dan-Mechanic (ダン・メカニック, Dan Mekanikku) No. 1, which forms Dangaioh's head and back.
Roll Kran (ロール・クラン, Rōru Kuran)
Voiced by: Akira Kamiya (Japanese); Edward Glen (English)
A naive boy who has the ability to generate kinetic energy while running. Roll was once the leader of a resistance group on his home planet of Latecia (ラテシア, Ratesia), which had fallen to the Bunker Space Pirates. The war had taken its toll on the resistance, which resulted in his comrades Burst and Flash betray him and leave him for dead before Dr. Tarsan added him to the Dangaioh project. He pilots Dan-Mechanic No. 2, which forms Dangaioh's torso, and is Dangaioh's main controller.
Lamba Nom (ランバ・ノム, Ranba Nomu)
Voiced by: Maya Okamoto (Japanese); Julia Brahms (English)
A childish girl who can fire laser blasts from her fingers. Lamba was a princess of the planet Lilith (リリス, Ririsu), but she fled before the Bunker destroyed her home planet. She pilots Dan-Mechanic No. 3, which forms Dangaioh's arms.
Pai Thunder (パイ・サンダー, Pai Sandā)
Voiced by: Naoko Matsui (Japanese); Alice Barrty (English)
A tough-as-nails girl with superhuman strength. Upon recovering her memories, Pai reveals herself to be Barius (バリアス, Bariasu), daughter of the Bunker's Captain Galimos, but she renounces her birthright to side with the Dangaioh team. She pilots Dan-Mechanic No. 4, which forms Dangaioh's legs.
Dr. Tarsan (ターサン博士, Tāsan Hakase)
Voiced by: Takeshi Aono (Japanese); David Collins (English)
Creator of Dangaioh. Dr. Tarsan reconditions the memories of Mia, Roll, Lamba, and Pai to become ESPers and initially intends to sell them and Dangaioh to Captain Galimos, but after the quartet escape, he has a sudden change of heart and supports them in their war against the Bunker Space Pirates.

=== Antagonists ===
Gil Berg (ギル・バーグ, Giru Bāgu)
Voiced by: Shigeru Chiba (Japanese); Robert Glenister (English)
A cyborg and former assistant of Dr. Tarsan. Gil despises Mia's calm and gentle demeanor and hates the Dangaioh team for being chosen instead of him to be sold to the Bunker Space Pirates. After Dr. Tarsan betrays Captain Galimos, Gil displays his loyalty to the Bunker by removing his own left eye, destroying the last of his humanity. He invades Earth and wreaks havoc on Tokyo with his Bloody I (ブラッディI, Buradi Wan)/Bloody II (ブラッディII, Buradi Tsū) mecha, but is killed by Dangaioh. Gil is resurrected by Commander Dartilla at the end of episode 2, and lures the Dangaioh Team into a trap by disguising himself as Skeleton (スケレトン, Sukereton), a masked mercenary siding with the Latecia resistance. Following the defeat of Burst and Flash, Gil uses his new mecha Gil Gear (ギル・ギア, Giru Gia) to severely damage Dangaioh, but Dangaioh uses the last of its energy to destroy Gil Gear before disappearing. Despite his loss and the death of Commander Dartilla, Gil is promoted as one of Captain Galimos's generals.
Captain Galimos (ガリモス大船長, Garimosu Daisenchō)
Voiced by: Kenichi Ogata (Japanese); Seán Barret (English)
Leader of the Bunker Space Pirates (宇宙海賊バンカー, Uchū Kaizoku Bankā). Captain Galimos has used his power to conquer various star systems.
General Mestilla (闘将メスティラ, Tōshō Mesutira)
Voiced by: Kōzō Shioya
Colonel Goutilla (猛将ゴウティラ, Mōshō Goutira)
Voiced by: Hiroshi Ōtake
Sub-General Santilla (賢将サンティラ, Kenshō Santira)
Voiced by: Osamu Saka
Commander Dartilla (妖将ダァティラ, Yōshō Daatira)
Voiced by: Daisuke Gōri
Captain Galimos's four generals. While the generals disapprove of Captain Galimos' support of Gil Berg, Dartilla takes the cyborg under his wing. Dartilla is killed when Dangaioh destroys the Bunker's base on planet Latecia.
Yoldo (ヨルド, Yorudo)
Voiced by: Ichirou Mizuki
Deela (ディラ, Diira)
Voiced by: Mitsuko Horie (Japanese); Toni Barry (English)
Dr. Tarsan's two other creations, Yoldo is a cyborg while Deela is an android. When the Dangaioh team escapes from Dr. Tarsan's ship, Yoldo and Deela are assigned to capture them. They intercept the quartet on a desert planet, but Yoldo is killed by Pai. Deela's ship is destroyed when Mia deflects a hyper-napalm bomb with her telekinesis, but she tells them Dr. Tarsan's original motives for them before she deactivates from her injuries.
Shazarla (シャザーラ, Shazāra)
Voiced by: Masako Katsuki (Japanese); Jocelyn Cunningham (English)
Lamba's former servant in Lilith. Following the destruction of Lilith, Shazarla joins the Bunker, feeling that the Nom family betrayed her people. She leads a trio of assassins and controls the mecha Aizam the Third (アイザム・ザ・サード, Aizamu za Sādo) on a mission to destroy Dangaioh. Her thirst for vengeance, however, is overpowered by Lamba's will to fight for her lost people. Upon discovering that Dangaioh's Psychic Wave hands bear the symbol of the Kingdom of Lilith, Shazarla concedes and allows herself and her subordinates to be killed by Lamba's Spiral Knuckle attack.
Domdon (ドムドン, Domudon)
Voiced by: Michitaka Kobayashi
Oscar (オスカー, Osukā)
Voiced by: Yusaku Yara
Shazarla's subordinates. Domdon has the ability to manipulate gravity while Oscar possesses superhuman strength equal to that of Pai.
Burst (バースト, Bāsuto)
Voiced by: Kazuhiko Inoue
Flash (フラッシュ, Furasshu)
Voiced by: Ryō Horikawa
Former members of the resistance group on Latecia. Frustrated by the belief that they are fighting a losing war, Burst and Flash betray Roll and leave him for dead to join the Bunker. They are both killed when their mechas Blast (ブラスト, Burasto) and Ridle (ライドール, Raidōru) are crushed by Dangaioh's Psychic Wave.

=== Supporting characters ===
Kilkel (キルケル, Kirukeru)
Voiced by: Daiki Nakamura
Folk (フｫーク, Fōku)
Voiced by: Ken Yamaguchi
Mido (ミドー, Midō)
Voiced by: Naoko Watanabe
Members of the Latecia resistance group who took leadership after Roll's disappearance. They blame Roll for the loss of morale in the resistance, as well as the apparent deaths of Burst and Flash. Kilkel and Folk are murdered by Burst and Flash as part of a plot to capture Roll in the Bunker's base.

== Episodes ==
No.	Title	Original release date
1	"Cross Fight!!"; Transliteration: "Kurosu Faito!!" (Japanese: クロス・ファイト!!)	September 28, 1987
Mia Alice, Roll Kran, Lamba Nom, and Pai Thunder are four teenagers brainwashed and reconditioned as ESPers by Dr. Tarsan, who intends to sell their services to the Bunker Space Pirates. The quartet, however, escapes from Dr. Tarsan's ship, infuriating Bunker leader Captain Galimos. Gil Berg, Dr. Tarsan's cyborg assistant, offers his services to Galimos to capture the teenagers. He heads to Earth to lure the teenagers, as Mia is originally from the planet. Following an encounter with two of Dr. Tarsan's other creations, Pai regains her memories and heads to the Bunker's capital ship, taking an unconscious Roll with her. She reveals herself to Galimos as her daughter Barius, but she quickly renounces her birthright before rejoining her teammates and head to Earth with Dr. Tarsan, who also develops a change of heart. Upon their arrival to Tokyo, the teenagers combine their Dan-Mechanics to form Dangaioh and defeat Gil. They offer to spare his life, but he chooses to go down with his destroyed mecha instead. Despite returning to Earth, Mia chooses to stay with the team, as she has no memories of her past life.
2	"Spiral Knuckles in Tears"; Transliteration: "Namida no Supairaru Nakkuru" (Japanese: 涙のスパイラルナックル)	October 25, 1988
As the Dangaioh Team continues their training, they encounter a trio of assassins sent by the Bunker to eliminate them. During the fight, Mia and Pai mentally discover that Shazarla, the leader of the assassins, has a personal grudge on Lamba. After the assassins retreat, the team learns that Lamba was a member of the royal family of the planet Lilith, and that Shazarla was her former servant. Thinking that Shazarla was brainwashed by the Bunker, Lamba ventures through the snowy forest alone, but after being captured by the assassins, she discovers that Shazarla blames the Nom family for surrendering to the Bunker before Lilith was plundered of its resources and destroyed. Taking Lamba with them, the assassins attack Dr. Tarsan's ship, but the Dangaioh Team counterattacks and recovers Lamba. Dangaioh is sortied to battle the assassins' mecha Aizam the Third. As the assassins have the upper hand, Lamba apologizes to Shazarla for her family's misgivings, but she chooses to fight for the lives lost in Lilith. When Lamba's power fully recharges Dangaioh, the team traps Aizam the Third in a Psychic Wave before Lamba offers to execute the death blow. Back at the Bunker's capital ship, Gil Berg is revealed to have been resurrected. Note: The episode begins with an 11-minute summary of episode 1.
3	"The Demonic Revenge of Gil Berg"; Transliteration: "Fukushū Oni Giru Bāgu" (Japanese: 復讐鬼ギルバーグ)	July 25, 1989
The Dangaioh Team travels to Roll's home planet of Latecia to assist the resistance group's war on the Bunker, but Roll is haunted by fragments of his past. He reunites with the resistance, who are not thrilled with his return after having disappeared years ago. After the masked mercenary Skeleton convinces the resistance to trust Roll, they plan to storm through the Bunker's base, which uses captured soldiers as lifeblood of a bio-mechanical computer. Meanwhile, Dr. Tarsan reveals to the rest of the team that Roll was previously murdered by members of the resistance; hence his fear of death. Upon arriving at the Bunker base, Roll discovers that he has fallen into a trap set by his former comrades Burst and Flash, along with Skeleton-who reveals himself as Gil Berg. Using Roll as bait, Gil requests for Mia to meet with him alone to spare her teammate's life. As Gil tortures Mia, Roll conquers his fear of death and breaks free to save her before they regroup with the Dangaioh Team. Dangaioh kills Burst and Flash in a mecha battle before destroying Commander Dartilla and the Bunker base, but Gil emerges in the Gil Gear and attacks Dangaioh and severely damages Dr. Tarsan's ship. A critically damaged Dangaioh uses its remaining power to destroy Gil Gear with one final Psychic Wave. Dr. Tarsan fires a warp beam to teleport Dangaioh away before he goes down with his ship. Gil survives the battle and is promoted as one of Captain Galimos' generals. Elsewhere, the four cockpits of Dangaioh with their unconscious pilots are seen drifting in space.

== Music ==
The score was composed by Chumei Watanabe, with additional music for episode 3 by Kaoru Mizutani. The soundtrack for episode 1 was released by Nippon Columbia on CD on April 21, 1987, and on LP and cassette on August 21, 1987. It was reissued on March 21, 2007, as No. 169 of Nippon Columbia's "Animex 1200" series. The soundtrack for episodes 2 and 3 was released by Platz on CD on July 21, 1989.

The first opening and ending themes were released as a 7" vinyl single on July 21, 1987.

Opening theme

- "Cross Fight!" (eps. 1–2)

Lyrics: Akira Ōtsu
Music: Chumei Watanabe
Vocals: Mitsuko Horie and Ichirou Mizuki

- "Cheap Thrills" (ep. 3)

Lyrics: Takeshi Sakakibara
Music: Tatsuyuki Ōhara
Vocals: Hidemi Nakai
Ending theme

- "Kokoro no Honesty" (心のオネスティー, Kokoro no Onesutī; lit. 'Honesty of the Heart') (eps. 1–2)

Lyrics: Akira Ōtsu
Music: Chumei Watanabe
Vocals: Mitsuko Horie

- "Who's Gonna Win?" (ep. 3)

Lyrics: Takeshi Sakakibara
Music: Tatsuyuki Ōhara
Vocals: Hidemi Nakai

== Release ==
=== Japan ===
Dangaioh was reissued in a two-LaserDisc set by Bandai Visual in 1998. The OVA was released on DVD on January 25, 2002. It was reissued on September 24, 2010, as part of the "Emotion the Best" DVD line.

Dangaioh was released on Blu-ray by King Records on April 27, 2016. For this release, episodes 1–2 were remastered in 1080p HD from the original 35mm negatives, while episode 3 was upconverted from the DVD source to 1080i using Q-tec's FORS (Faithful Original Source) system.

=== North America ===
Episode 1 of Dangaioh was first released in North America on subtitled VHS format by U.S. Renditions in 1990 as Dangaio. It was infamously known for a subtitling error towards the end of the episode. Dangaioh's final attacks "Psychic Wave" and "Psychic Sword" were misspelled as "Side-kick Wave" and "Side-kick Sword." Episodes 2 and 3 were released in 1992 with a different translation staff behind the subtitling production.

Following the demise of U.S. Renditions in the mid-1990s, Manga Entertainment re-released Dangaioh in 1996 as Dangaioh: Hyper Combat Unit, which was an English-dubbed compilation of episodes 2–3. Episode 1 was omitted from this release, as episode 2 begins with a summary of the episode. This version was released on DVD on January 28, 2003.

== Merchandise ==
Kaiyodo released Dangaioh in the Revoltech action figure line in 2007. Studio Half Eye released a fully transformable Dangaioh model kit in 2014; it was then released as a completed toy in 2021. In May 2021, Good Smile Company released a model kit of Dangaioh as part of the Moderoid line. King Arts released a diecast toy of Dangaioh, based on the Moderoid kit.

== Sequel ==
A new 13-episode series named Great Dangaioh ran from April 5, 2001, through July 5, 2001, on TV Asahi in Japan. The series was created and directed by Hirano, and produced by AIC. Hirano's wife, Narumi Kakinouchi, was the animation director. Originally perceived as a completely different story, the series was revealed halfway as the sequel to the OVA series.

The series was licensed in North America by Viz Media, featuring an English dub produced in the Philippines by Telesuccess Productions.

== Video games ==
An Dangaioh adventure game was released for the PC-8801 in Japan in April 1990. Dangaioh's characters, mecha, and storyline elements appeared in Banpresto's Super Robot Wars games. They initially appeared in Super Robot Wars Compact 2 (Parts 1, 2, and 3) for the WonderSwan game system, and later in its PlayStation 2 remake, Super Robot Wars Impact, as well as the Nintendo DS game, Super Robot Wars K. Impact notably features voice acting from the original Japanese voice actors.

The Nintendo 64 and Dreamcast video game Bangai-O contains various references to the series.
