= Mayumi Shō =

Japanese voice actress (born 1965)

- 荘 真由美
- Born: February 5, 1965 (age 61); Tokyo, Japan
- Occupations: Voice actress Director at Kekke Corporation
- Years active: 1984–2007
- Spouse: Keiichi Nanba

Mayumi Shō (荘 真由美, Shō Mayumi; born February 5, 1965 in Tokyo) is a Japanese retired voice actress. She formerly worked at Aoni Production and is now a director at Kekke Corporation. She is married to voice actor Keiichi Nanba.

== Filmography ==
=== Television animation ===
- Adventures of the Little Koala (1984) (Mimi)
- High School! Kimengumi (1985) (Kiri Ichidou)
- Dragon Ball (1986) (Chi-Chi)
- Maison Ikkoku (1986) (Ikuko Otonashi)
- Mobile Suit Gundam ZZ (1986) (Haro and Qum)
- Lady!! (1987-1988) (Mary Waverley)
- Ai no Wakakusa Monogatari (1987) (Beth March)
- Kimagure Orange Road (1987) (Kumiko Oda)
- Kiteretsu Daihyakka (1988) (Miyoko Nonoka (1st voice))
- Oishinbo (1988) (Yūko Kurita)
- Dragon Ball Z (1989) (Chi-Chi (1st voice))
- The Kindaichi Case Files (1998) (Naoko Torimaru) (ep 51-54)
- Konjiki no Gash Bell!! (2003) (Sherry's Mother)
- Futari wa Pretty Cure (2004) (Rie Misumi)
- Welcome to the N.H.K. (2006) (Satou Shizue)
- Love Com (2007) (Umibozu's wife)

=== OVA ===
- Fight! Iczer One (1985) (Nagisa Kanou)
- Dancouga – Super Beast Machine God (1985) (Sayuri Michinaga)
- Megazone 23 (1985) (Mai Yumekano)
- Dangaioh (1987) (Mia Alice)
- Appleseed (1988) (Hitomi)
- Space Family Carlvinson (1988) (Corona)
- Hades Project Zeorymer (1988) (Yuratei)

=== Theatrical animation ===
- Lupin III: The Plot of the Fuma Clan (1987) (Murasaki Suminawa)
- Saint Seiya: The Movie (1987) (Eri Aizawa)
- Mobile Suit Gundam: Char's Counterattack (1988) (Cheimin Noa)
- Dragon Ball Z: Dead Zone (1989) (Chi-Chi)
- Dragon Ball Z: The World's Strongest (1990) (Chi-Chi)
- Dragon Ball Z: The Tree of Might (1990) (Chi-Chi)
- Doraemon: Nobita Drifts in the Universe (1999) (Freyja)

=== Video games ===
- Golden Axe (1989) (Princess consort)
- Ys I & II (1989) (Reah)
- Final Zone II (1990) (Ling Momoko)
- Death Bringer (1992) (Claudia)
- Dragon Ball Z: Budokai (2002) (Chi-Chi)

=== Dubbing ===
- The NeverEnding Story (The Childlike Empress (Tami Stronach))
