= Chumei Watanabe =

Japanese composer (1925–2022)

Chumei Watanabe 渡辺 宙明
- Born: Michiaki Watanabe; August 19, 1925; Nagoya, Aichi, Japan
- Died: June 23, 2022 (aged 96) Tokyo, Japan
- Occupations: Composer, arranger
- Years active: 1956–2022

Chumei Watanabe (渡辺 宙明(ちゅうめい ), Watanabe Chūmei), born Michiaki Watanabe (渡辺 宙明(みちあき), Watanabe Michiaki), (August 19, 1925 – June 23, 2022) was a Japanese film score and television score composer. He worked on various tokusatsu shows and mecha anime.

== Personal life ==
His son, Toshiyuki Watanabe, is a musician and composer, who also has scored films and anime series and his granddaughter Mako Watanabe is part of the idol duo Namakopuri where she goes under the stage name, Mako Principal.

He died on June 23, 2022, at the age of 96.

== Awards ==
For his work on anime, Watanabe received an Award of Merit at the 8th Tokyo Anime Awards and an Animation Lifetime Achievement Award at the 25th Japan Movie Critics Awards.
