= Mitsuo Hashimoto (director) =

Japanese anime director

Mitsuo Hashimoto (橋本 みつお, Hashimoto Mitsuo) is a Japanese storyboard artist and director of television, OVA, and anime films. He previously worked under 橋本 光夫 (pronounced the same), but changed as someone else was using that name. While he was under contract with Toei Animation, he also did work for other companies under the name Genjūrō Tachibana (立花 源十郎, Tachibana Genjūrō).

Hashimoto is known for his work on series such as the Dr. Slump & Arale-chan TV and film series, several Dragon Ball TV series, as well as several of the Dragon Ball features. In recent years, he has worked as a director on mostly independent (or "hobby") anime works.

== Works ==
=== Anime television series ===
Credits are for director unless otherwise indicated.

- Dr. Slump & Arale-chan (1981-1986, assistant director)
- Dragon Ball (1986-1989, assistant director)
  - Dragon Ball Z (1989-1996, director, OP/ED credits director)
  - Dragon Ball GT (1996-1997)
- Ninku (1995-1996, storyboards, director (as Tachibana))
- Midori no Makibaō (1996-1997, storyboards, director (as Tachibana))
- Kindaichi Case Files (1997-2000)
- Flame of Recca (1997-1998, storyboards, director (as Tachibana))
- Hanitarō Desu. (1997-1998)
- Haruniwake no Saninme (1998)
- Heritako Pū-chan (1998-1999, chief director)
- Silent Möbius (1998, storyboards (as Tachibana))
- Master Keaton (1998-1999 (as Tachibana))
- Dokkiri Doctor (1998-1999 storyboards (as Tachibana))
- Kamikaze Kaito Jeanne (1999-2000)
- D4 Princess (1999, storyboards, director (as Tachibana))
- Bubu Chacha (1999, storyboards (as Tachibana))
- We Know You, Moonlight Mask-kun! (1999-2000, storyboards (as Tachibana))
- Shinzo (2000, director, OP credits director)
- Herohero-kun (2000-2001 (as Tachibana))
- Shin Megami Tensei: Devil Children (2000-2001, storyboards, director (as Tachibana))
- Pipo Papo Patrol-kun (2000-2001, chief director)
- I Love Bubu Chacha (2001, storyboards, director (as Tachibana))
- Panyo Panyo Di Gi Charat (2002, storyboards, director)
- Beyblade (2002-2003, storyboards, director)
- Galaxy Angel Z (2002)
- Chobits (2002)
- Tsuribaka Nisshi (2002-2003)
- Weiß Kreuz Glühen (2002-2003, storyboards, director)
- Galaxy Angel A (2002-2003, storyboards, director)
- Battle B-Daman (2004-2005)
  - Crash B-Daman (2006, storyboards)
- Kirarin Revolution (2006-2007, storyboards, director)
- Bakugan Battle Brawlers (2007-2012)
- Scan2Go (2010-2011)
- Initial D Fifth Stage (2012-2013)
- Initial D Final Stage (2014)
- Omakase! Miracle Cat-dan (2015-2016)
- Kamiwaza Wanda (2016-2017)
- Yōkai Apāto no Yūga na Nichijō (2017)

=== OVA ===
Credits are for director unless otherwise indicated.

- Dragon Ball: Goku's Traffic Safety (1988, director)
- Chameleon (manga) (1992-1996, episodes 1-2)
- TwinBee: Winbee no 1/8 Panic (1994)

=== Anime films ===
Credits are for director unless otherwise indicated.

- Dragon Ball: Curse of the Blood Rubies (1986, assistant director)
- Dragon Ball: Sleeping Princess in Devil's Castle (1987, assistant director)
- Dragon Ball Z: The Tree of Might (1990, storyboards)
- Dragon Ball Z: Bardock – The Father of Goku (1990, TV Special)
- Dragon Ball Z: Lord Slug (1991)
- Dragon Ball Z: Cooler's Revenge (1991)
- Dr. Slump and Arale-chan: N-cha! From Penguin Village with Love (1993)
- Dr. Slump and Arale-chan: Hoyoyo!! Follow the Rescued Shark... (1994)
- Dr. Slump and Arale-chan: N-cha!! Excited Heart of Summer Vacation (1994)
- Dragon Ball Z: Wrath of the Dragon (1995)
- Tamagotchi: Honto no Hanashi (1997)
