= List of Strawberry Marshmallow episodes =

This is a list of episodes for the anime Strawberry Marshmallow. Strawberry Marshmallow is based on a Japanese manga series of the same name by manga creator Barasui about the adventures and lives of Nobue Itoh, her younger sister Chika, and Chika's three friends Miu, Matsuri, and Ana. The list of episodes spans 12 TV episodes, 3 episodes from the Ichigo Mashimaro Original Video Animation series, followed by 2 episodes from the Ichigo Mashimaro encore OVA series. The episodes were all directed by Takuya Sato, who was also responsible for the writing of the series.

The opening for the anime television series is "Ichigo Complete", sung by Saeko Chiba, Fumiko Orikasa, Ayako Kawasumi, Mamiko Noto, and Hitomi Nabatame. The ending for the anime television series is "Classmate", sung by Miu's voice actress Fumiko Orikasa. The opening for the OVA series is "Akkan berry berry", also sung by Chiba, Orikasa, Kawasumi, Noto, and Nabatame. The ending for the OVA series is "Yūmachi no Kaze" (夕待ちの風) sung by Orikasa. The opening for the Encore OVA is "Ichigo Splash" (苺すぷらっしゅ), sung again by Chiba, Orikasa, Kawasumi, Noto, and Nabatame. The ending for the Encore OVA is also sung by Orikasa and is titled "Zutto, Zutto" (ずっと, ずっと).

== Episodes ==
The animated series was first televised in Japan, then sold as DVDs in Japan and overseas.

A brief (4-minute) episode was also produced to introduce the series and main characters. In this special, Nobue, her sister Chika, and her three friends are in a spaceship (which looks exactly like Chika's room at home) traveling toward Earth when the ship's oxygen supply begins to leak. Nobue, sensing there is enough oxygen for four people but not five, sends Miu out to float in space, left to find her own way home. In retaliation for this act, Miu takes all the food, candy, and cigarettes with her when she's unceremoniously "booted out".

No.	Title	Original release date
1	"Birthday"; Transliteration: "Bāsudi" (Japanese: バースディ)	July 14, 2005
Chika, Miu and Matsuri notice that it's Nobue's birthday and plan to make her a gift by themselves.
2	"Ana"; Transliteration: "Ana" (Japanese: アナ)	July 21, 2005
Matsuri gets a new classmate, Ana, an English girl with blonde hair and blue eyes, who decides that after some unpleasant experience in her previous school she will pretend to know nothing about Japan or Japanese. The only problem is that she has already been in Japan for five years and her parents use Japanese at home, so her English is very far from perfect.
3	"House Call"; Transliteration: "Katei Hōmon" (Japanese: 家庭訪問)	July 28, 2005
Ana invites Matsuri at her place to help her study English. But much to her grief, the entire gang decides to tag along.
4	"Part-Time Job"; Transliteration: "Arubaito" (Japanese: アルバイト)	August 18, 2005
Nobue finds out she's ran out of money to buy cigarettes and tries to find a fitting part-time job. Ana, Matsuri, Chika and Miu do their best and worst to help her.
5	"Sleeping Together"; Transliteration: "Soine" (Japanese: そいね)	August 25, 2005
Miu becomes jealous over the attention Ana and Matsuri gain from Nobue.
6	"Midsummer Day"; Transliteration: "Manatsubi" (Japanese: 真夏日)	September 1, 2005
Intense summer heat causes the girls' imagination to run wild again.
7	"Sea Bathing"; Transliteration: "Kaisuiyoku" (Japanese: 海水浴)	September 1, 2005
Miu is shooting a video documentary for school, and chooses the Itō household as her subject. In the end, Nobue takes the gang out for a beach trip.
8	"Festival"; Transliteration: "Omatsuri" (Japanese: お祭り)	September 15, 2005
A festival episode has the gang dress up in yukatas and head out to see fireworks.
9	"Growing"; Transliteration: "Sodachizakari" (Japanese: 育ちざかり)	September 22, 2005
Chika discovers that she's gained a bit of weight and, provoked by Miu, tries to go on a diet. It's only after a remark by Nobue that Chika's self-confidence gets restored.
10	"Flower"; Transliteration: "Hana" (Japanese: 花)	September 29, 2005
Many sidequests disturb the girls' trip to a distant restaurant to have cake with Nobue.
11	"First Snow"; Transliteration: "Hatsuyuki" (Japanese: 初雪)	October 6, 2005
After a freezing cold autumn day, the gang pays a visit to hot baths and witnesses the first snow fall.
12	"Present"; Transliteration: "Purezento" (Japanese: プレゼント)	October 13, 2005
Matsuri's faith in Santa Claus makes the rest of the gang guarantee her a happy Christmas.

== OVAs ==
The Ichigo Mashimaro Original Video Animation (苺ましまろオリジナルビデオアニメーション) series was released in Japan as DVDs after the TV series ended.

No.	Title	Original release date
1	"Scenery."; Transliteration: "Keshiki" (Japanese: けしき.)	February 23, 2007
Nobue goes job hunting, but has her application sabotaged by Miu. Ana's classmates realize her Japanese has "improved". The girls enjoy a normal day at school, and look up various words in a dictionary.
2	"The Usual."; Transliteration: "Itsumo" (Japanese: いつも.)	March 28, 2007
The girls play hide-and-seek, dress up, and engage in their usual antics. Everyone worries about whether Matsuri will be able to handle life as she grows up.
3	"Everyday."; Transliteration: "Mainichi" (Japanese: まいにち.)	April 25, 2007
The girls go on a trip to Izu over a holiday weekend. They visit a public bath, tell ghost stories, and go out for a late night walk.

=== Ichigo Mashimaro Encore OVAs ===
Ichigo Mashimaro Encore (苺ましまろencore) was released in Japan as DVDs. This series followed Ichigo Mashimaro Original Video Animation.

No.	Title	Original release date
1	"Good Afternoon"; Transliteration: "Haisai" (Japanese: ハイサイ)	January 23, 2009
Miu hits her head and transcends to heaven, and causes a ruckus there before regaining consciousness. The crew go on a school trip to paint in a park.
2	"See You Tomorrow"; Transliteration: "Mata Ashita" (Japanese: またあした)	March 25, 2009
Miu gets the gang contemplating the nature of their friendships, followed by her prediction of how the girls will turn out in junior high. Nobue decides to take them to the beach.
