= Mika Kanai =

Japanese voice actress (born 1964)

- かない みか
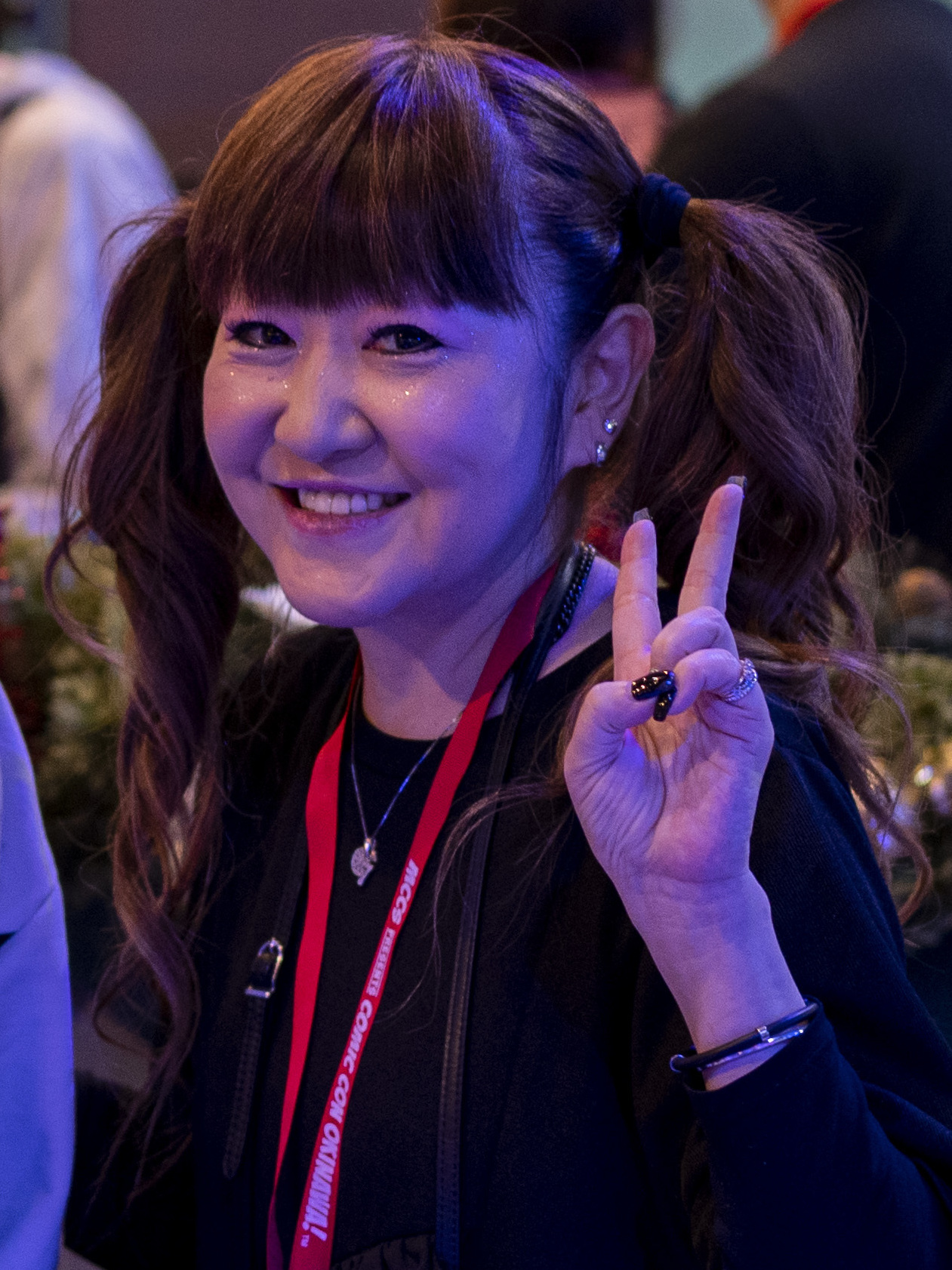
- Kanai in 2022
- Born: Mika Kanai (金井 美香); March 18, 1964 (age 62); Setagaya, Tokyo, Japan
- Other name: Mikapii (みかぴぃ)
- Occupations: Voice actress; singer
- Years active: 1989–present
- Agent: Ken Production
- Known for: Idol Angel Yokoso Yoko as Yoko Tanaka; Tanoshii Moomin Ikka as the Snork Maiden; Goldfish Warning! as Wapiko; Let's Go! Anpanman as Melonpanna; Yadamon as Yadamon; After War Gundam X as Tiffa Adill; Hare Tokidoki Buta as Harebuta; Galaxy Angel as Vanilla H and Normad; Higurashi When They Cry as Satoko Hōjō; Tales of Phantasia as Arche Klein; Uchi no 3 Shimai as Sū; Sailor Moon S as Mimet; Mysterious Theft Saint Tail as Maju Sendo; Pokémon and Super Smash Bros. as Jigglypuff
- Spouse: Kōichi Yamadera (m. 1993; div. 2006)
- Relatives: Akihisa Kanai (father); Kazue Tagami (mother)
- Website: Official profile

Mika Kanai (金井 美香(かない みか), Kanai Mika; born March 18, 1964) is a Japanese voice actress and singer. She is attached to Ken Production. She is best known for her roles in Idol Angel Yokoso Yoko (as Yoko Tanaka), Tanoshii Moomin Ikka (as the Snork Maiden), Goldfish Warning! (as Wapiko), Let's Go! Anpanman (as Melonpanna), Yadamon (as Yadamon), After War Gundam X (as Tiffa Adill), Hare Tokidoki Buta (as Harebuta), Galaxy Angel (as Vanilla H and Normad), Higurashi When They Cry (as Satoko Hōjō), Tales of Phantasia (as Arche Klein), Uchi no 3 Shimai (as Sū), Sailor Moon S (as Mimet), Mysterious Theft Saint Tail (as Maju Sendo). She is currently the voice of Jigglypuff in the Pokémon and Super Smash Bros. series. She freelanced for the voice of Bonnie, also from the Pokémon series when her regular voice actress Mariya Ise was on maternity leave.

She married Kōichi Yamadera from 1993 to 2006, though their divorce was not disclosed until 2007. They have worked together on the long-running Let's Go! Anpanman series. Her parents worked at the Seinenza Theater Company.

== Filmography ==
=== Animation ===
List of voice performances in animation
Year	Title	Role	Notes	Source
1979	Doraemon	Sumire Hoshino, Saki	Second voice Ep. 1686	
1988–present	Let's Go! Anpanman	Melonpanna	メロメロパンチ	
1989	Patlabor The Mobile Police	Kana Matsumoto		
1989	City Hunter 3	Girl		
1990	Chibi Maruko-chan	Togawa-sensei's wife		
1990	Idol Angel Yokoso Yoko	Yoko Tanaka		
1990	NG Knight Ramune & 40	Yakkyun	Ep. 30	
1990	Moomin	Floren		
1990	Mōretsu Atarō	Matsushiro	2nd TV series	
1990–92, 1997	Licca-chan	Licca	OVA series	
1991	Goldfish Warning!	Wapiko	はよ～ん	
1991	The Brave of Sun Fighbird	Mayumi		
1991–92	Shonen Ashibe series	Mao (Peppeppe)		
1991	Locke the Superman: New World Command	Erika	OVA series	
1992	Tsuyoshi Shikkari Shinasai	Rie		
1992	Flower Witch Mary Bell	Little		
1992–94	Sailor Moon	Mikan Shiratori, Mimete		
1992	The Cobi Troupe	Noshi		
1992	Cooking Papa	Sanae Yoshinaga		
1992	Crayon Shin-chan	Kazama's friends, Belle		
1992	K.O. Beast	Mei Mah	OVA	
1992	Yadamon	Yadamon		
1992	Thumbelina: A Magical Story	Maya		
1992	YuYu Hakusho	Girl, Sasuga		
1993	The Irresponsible Captain Tylor	Yumi Hanner, Emi Hanner		
1993	Nintama Rantarō	Okuni		
1993	Heisei Inu Monogatari Bau	Witch		
1994	Yamato Takeru	Oto Tachibana		
1994	Combustible Campus Guardress	Aoba Hime	OVA	
1994	Magical Circle Guru Guru	Cherry		
1995	Ninku	Natsuko		
1995	Jura Tripper	Asuka		
1995	Wedding Peach	Pajama		
1995	Mama Loves the Poyopoyo-Saurus	Small boy		
1995	Saint Tail	Maju Sendo		
1995	Dirty Pair Flash	Monica	OVA Part 3, Ep. 2	
1996	Sonic the Hedgehog	Sara (セーラ Sēra)	OVA series	
1996	After War Gundam X	Tifa Adelle	あなたに力を・・・	
1996	Idol Janshi Suchie-Pai II	Suchipai (Kyoko Misaki)	OVA	
1996	Shonen Santa no Daiboken	May		
1996	Baby & Me	Ichika Fujii		
1996–97	Remi, Nobody's Girl	Lise		
1997–present	Pokémon	Bayleef, Chikorita, Emolga, Espeon, Jigglypuff, Marill, others		
1997	The Kindaichi Case Files	Mizuho Ninomiya		
1997	Fair, then Partly Piggy	Harebuta, others		
1997	Manmaru The Ninja Penguin	Ranko		
1997	Vampire Princess Miyu	Shiina	TV series	
1997	Detatoko Princess	Nandra	OVA	
1997	Brave Command Dagwon: The Boy with Crystal Eyes	Nagisa Hirose	OVA	
1998	Trigun	Neil	Ep. 10	
1998	Fancy Lala	Asuka Futatsugi	Ep. 22	
1998	Ojarumaru	Hachiko		
1999	Starship Girl Yamamoto Yohko	Rote		
1999–2000	Monster Rancher	Miminya, Meow		
1999–2001	Bubu Chacha	Bubu Pyoko		
1999	Kakyūsei	Urara Kasuga	OVA Adult	
2000	Mon Colle Knights	Beginner-chan		
2000	Mighty Cat Masked Niyander	Miko (Nyanda Karen) ミーコ（ニャンダーかれん）	2代目	
2000	Daa! Daa! Daa!	Ru	宇宙人の赤ちゃん	
2000	UFO Baby	Roux-kun		
2000	Platinumhugen Ordian	Miru		
2001–06	Galaxy Angel	Normad, Vanilla H		
2001	Mo~tto! Ojamajo Doremi	Karin Hirano 平野かりん		
2001	PaRappa the Rapper	Sunny Funny	Main role	
2001	Vandread: Second Stage	Rebecca		
2002	Ojamajo Doremi DOKKA~N!	Pao		
2002	One: Kagayaku Kisetsu e	Mayu Shiina	OVA Ep. 4	
2002	Hanada Shōnen Shi	Rinko		
2002	Shin Megami Tensei Devil Children Light & Dark	Skuld		
2003	Lime-iro Senkitan	Saten		
2003	Wolf's Rain	Alchemist		
2003	Nanaka 6/17	Pikota		
2003	Someday's Dreamers	Girl		
2003	Ashita no Nadja	Luca		
2003	Popotan	Magical Girl Lilo-chan		
2003	Pluster World	Katchin-hime		
2003	Di Gi Charat Nyo!	Kinako Ankoro		
2003	Astro Boy	Denko		
2003	Zatch Bell!	Rops		
2003	Croket!	Mozzarella		
2003	Avenger	Nei		
2003	Planetes	Sher		
2003	Full-Blast Science Adventure – So That's How It Is	Priestess		
2003	Space Pirate Captain Herlock: The Endless Odyssey	Brow まゆ		
2003	Cromartie High School	Mika-chan, Mekasawa β		
2004	Ghost in the Shell S.A.C. 2nd GIG	Togusa's daughter		
2004–05	Kaiketsu Zorori series	Hanli, Manyi		
2004	Nanami-chan	Emiko Zashiki		
2004	Kurau Phantom Memory	Baby		
2004	Sweet Valerian	Panda-bu, Narrator		
2004–06	School Rumble series	Pyotr		
2004–06	Tales of Phantasia: The Animation	Arche Klein	OVA series	
2005	Kyo Kara Maoh!	Child Yuri	2nd series	
2005	Majokko Tsukune-chan	Ton-chan		
2005	The Snow Queen	Lily		
2005	Onegai My Melody	Rika Takano	Ep. 22	
2005	Kotencotenco	Ai-chan		
2006	Kagihime Monogatari Eikyū Alice Rondo	Alice Twins		
2006–21	Higurashi When They Cry	Satoko Hōjō		
2006	Nana	Misato Uehara		
2006	Princess Princess	Sayaka Kono (child)		
2006	Ray: The Animation	Honoka		
2006	Black Jack 21	Marie		
2006	Hime-sama Goyōjin	Yimo		
2006–08	Code Geass: Lelouch of the Rebellion series	Kaguya Sumeragi		
2006	Kenichi: The Mightiest Disciple	Renka Ma		
2007	Les Misérables: Shōjo Cosette	Semplice, Toussaint		
2007	Naruto Shippuden	Yukimaru		
2007	Nagasarete Airantou	Kagami		
2008	Uchi no Sanshimai	Second daughter Sue		
2009	Kanamemo	Girl		
2010	Jewelpet	Angela		
2011	Kimi ni Todoke 2nd season	Schoolgirl		
2011	Is This a Zombie?	Delusion Yu		
2011	Yondemasuyo, Azazel-san	Yunitas		
2011	Hunter × Hunter	Leroute	2nd series	
2011	Chihayafuru	Sakura Kanai		
2012	Rock Lee and His Ninja Pals	Mii		
2013	Hyperdimension Neptunia: The Animation	Histoire		
2014	History's Strongest Disciple Kenichi	Renka Ma	OVA specials	
2014	Sabagebu!	Rozeria Haguro, Clerk		
2014	Gonna be the Twin-Tail!!	Wormgildy		
2015	The Rolling Girls	Aki Habara		
2015	Pokémon XY Kalos Quest	Bonnie/Eureka	XY087-XY100, stand-in for Mariya Ise	
2017	Kirakira PreCure a la Mode	Pekorin/Cure Pekorin		
2018	After the Rain	Kayoko Kubo		
2018	HUGtto! PreCure	Pekorin		
2020	Higurashi When They Cry Gou	Satoko Hōjō		
2021	Higurashi When They Cry Sotsu	Satoko Hōjō		
2021	Digimon Ghost Game	Fujitsumon		
2022	I'm the Villainess, So I'm Taming the Final Boss	Lara Jeanne Elmeya		
2025	A Wild Last Boss Appeared!	Parthenos		

=== Theatrical animation ===
List of voice performances in theatrical animation
Year	Title	Role	Notes	Source
1993–present	Let's Go! Anpanman films	Melonpanna		
1998	Pikachu's Summer Vacation	Marill, Jigglypuff	Short film	
1999	The Pikachu Expedition	Marill	Short film	
1999	Pocket Monsters the Movie - Mirage Pokémon: Lugia's Explosive Birth	Marill		
2000	Pichu and Pikachu	Chikorita	Short film	
2000	Pocket Monsters the Movie - Emperor of the Crystal Tower	Chikorita		
2001	Pikachu's Exciting Hide-and-seek	Bayleef	Short film	
2001	Pocket Monsters the Movie - Celebi: Encounter Beyond Time	Bayleef		
2002	A Tree of Palme	Pooh プー		
2002	Pocket Monsters the Movie - Guardian Gods of the City of Water	Espeon		
2003	Doraemon: Nobita and the Windmasters	Fūko		
2004	Doraemon: Nobita in the Wan-Nyan Spacetime Odyssey	Shami		
2006	Dōbutsu no Mori	Fuko		
2010	Mardock Scramble: The First Compression	Rare the Hair		
2011	Pocket Monsters Best Wishes! the Movie - Victini and the Black Hero: Zekrom and Pocket Monsters Best Wishes! the Movie - Victini and the White Hero: Reshiram	Emolga		
2012	Meloetta's Dazzling Recital	Emolga, Chicorita	Short film	
2012	Pocket Monsters Best Wishes! the Movie - Kyurem VS the Sacred Swordsman: Keldeo	Emolga		
2012	Fairy Tail the Movie: Phoenix Priestess	Momon		
2013	Pocket Monsters Best Wishes! the Movie - ExtremeSpeed Genesect: Mewtwo Awakens	Emolga		
2014	The Adventures of Tom Chibineko -Save the Earth! Friends-	Rola ローラ		
2016	Pokémon the Movie: Volcanion and the Mechanical Marvel	Sylveon		
2017	Pokémon the Movie: I Choose You!	Jigglypuff		
2017	Pretty Cure Dream Stars!	Pekorin		
2017	KiraKira Pretty Cure A La Mode the Movie	Pekorin		
2018	Pretty Cure Super Stars!	Pekorin		
2019	Pretty Cure Miracle Universe	Pekorin		
2023	Doraemon: Nobita's Sky Utopia	Diva Cat		

=== Video games ===
List of voice performances in video games
Year	Title	Role	Notes	Source
1991	Wakusei Woodstock: Funky Horror Band	Avivi アビビ	Mega-CD	
1994	Monster Maker	Rorien	PC Engine	
1995–2011	Tales of Phantasia	Arche Klein	Also related Tales Of games	
1997	Eve Burst Error	Akane Shibata	SS	
1997	Farland Story ja:ファーランドシリーズ	Pamela		
1997	Dokyusei 2	Kumiko Nagashima		
1997	Eternal Fantasy	Teddy		
1997	Bloody Roar	Alice	PS1/PS2	
1997	Ninpen Manmaru	Ranko	SS	
1998	Kindaichi Case Files: Star Viewing Island: Sad Demon of Revenge	Chihiro Kanno	PS1/PS2	
1998	Idol Janshi Suchie-Pai	Kyoko Misaki (Suchipai)	Adult game	
1998	Thousand Arms	Gobuo ratchet 五武王ラチェット	PS1/PS2	
1998	Ganbare Goemon: Kuru Nara Koi! Ayashige Ikka no Kuroi Kage	San	PS1/PS2	
1999	Bloody Roar 2: Bringer of the New Age	Alice	PS1/PS2	
1999	Super Smash Bros.	Jigglypuff	N64	
1999	Eternal Eden	Pisutiru root ピスティル・ルート	PS1/PS2	
2001	Bloody Roar 3	Alice	PS1/PS2	
2001	Sakura Wars games	Ci Caprice	Starting from Sakura Taisen 3	
2001	Super Smash Bros. Melee	Jigglypuff, Chikorita, Marill	GameCube	
2001	Growlanser III: The Dual Darkness	Annette Burns	PS1/PS2	
2002	Harry Potter and the Chamber of Secrets	Myrtle Wailing	PS1/PS2	
2002–04	Lime-iro Senkitan	Saten		
2003	Mario Party 5	Misstar, Mamar	GameCube	
2003–04	Doraemon games	Fuko, Shami		
2004	Zatch Bell! games	Rops	PS1/PS2	
2004–05	Croket! games	Mozzarella	Other	
2006	Nana: Everything Is Controlled By The Great Demon King	Misato Uehara	PSP	
2007–15	Higurashi: When They Cry games	Satoko Hōjō	PS1/PS2	
2007–08	Eternal Sonata	Salsa	Also Reprise	
2007	Another Century's Episode 3: The Final	Tiffa Adill	PS1/PS2	
2008	Code Geass: Lelouch of the Rebellion: Lost Colors	Kaguya Sumeragi	PS1/PS2	
2008	Super Smash Bros. Brawl	Jigglypuff	Wii	
2010–23	Hyperdimension Neptunia series	Histoire, Croire		
2013	Super Robot Wars series	Mio Sasuga		
2014	Super Heroine Chronicle	Himeko Kagura, Satoko Hojo		
2014	Super Smash Bros. for Nintendo 3DS & Wii U	Jigglypuff	Wii U, 3DS	
2018	Super Smash Bros. Ultimate	Jigglypuff	Switch	
2021	Mario Golf: Super Rush	Ninji	Switch	
2022	Dragon Quest Treasures	Madame Blancmange, Monsters	Switch	
2024	Super Mario Party Jamboree	Ninji	Switch	

=== Drama CD ===
List of voice performances in audio recordings
Title	Role	Notes	Source
Code Geass	Kaguya Sumeragi		
Higurashi: When They Cry	Satoko Hōjō		
Idol Project	Extra Kaidou		
Starship Girl Yamamoto Yohko	Rote		
Tales of Phantasia	Arche Klein		

=== Live-action ===
Year	Title	Role	Notes	Source
2022	Sono Koe no Anata e	Herself	Documentary film	

=== Dubbing roles ===
List of voice performances in overseas shows and films
Title	Role	Notes	Source
Alvin and the Chipmunks: The Squeakquel	Eleanor		
Alvin and the Chipmunks: Chipwrecked	Eleanor		
The Brave Little Toaster	Blanky	1993 NHK edition	
Charlie and the Chocolate Factory	Violet Beauregarde	2008 NTV edition	
The Exploits of Moominpappa: Adventures of a Young Moomin	Snorkmaiden		
Jumanji	Peter Shepherd	New DVD and Blu-ray Editions	
Kalifornia	Adele Connors		
Sleepless in Seattle	Jessica		
Tiny Toon Adventures	Shirley the Loon		
Hide and Seek	Emily Callaway		
Horton Hears a Who!	Katie		
Astro Boy aka Atom	Widget	2009 film	
Moomins on the Riviera	Floren		
The Fundamentals of Caring	Peaches		
My Little Pony Tomodachi wa Mahou	Apple Rose		

== Albums ==
- おもちゃ箱 (Omochabako/Toy Box) - 1992
- ダイアリ (Diary) - 1993
- ナチュレル (Naturelle) - 1994
- スタイル (Style) - 1995
- ジューク・ボックス (Juke Box) - 1996
- クラムチャウダー (Clam Chowder) - 1997
- MIKA KANAI "Best Selection" - 1998

== Awards ==
Year	Award	Category	Result
2019	13th Seiyu Awards	Kazue Takahashi Memorial Award	Won
