= Asako Shirakura =

Japanese voice actress

- 白倉 麻子
- Born: December 30, 1977 (age 48); Yamanashi Prefecture, Japan
- Other name: Asa Shirakura (白倉 麻)
- Occupation: Voice actress
- Agent: Aqua Place

Asako Shirakura (白倉 麻子, Shirakura Asako; born December 30, 1977), also known as Asa Shirakura (白倉 麻, Shirakura Asa), is a Japanese voice actress. She was associated with 81 Produce. and is now associated with Aqua Place. Her major roles include Tenchi Nanmi in Daa! Daa! Daa!, Eris in Orphen Revenge, and Chisato in Vampire Princess Miyu.

== Filmography ==
=== Anime ===
Year	Series	Role	Notes	Source
1997	Vampire Princess Miyu	Chisato Inoue		
1998	Bakusō Kyōdai Let's & Go!! MAX	Suzumu Marine		
1998	Rainbow of Senki Iris	Tioru		
1998	Time of Earth	Est		
1999	D4 Princess	Kurina Nozuru		
1999–2001	Bubu Chacha	Kana	Also Let's Go	
1999	Orphen Revenge	Eris		
2000	Daa! Daa! Daa!	Nanami Tenchi		
2001	InuYasha	Princess	Ep. 16	
2002	Tenchi Muyo! GXP	Suiren		

=== Video games ===
Year	Series	Role	Notes	Source
1998	Dance!Dance!Dance!	Hitomi	PS game	
1998	Lord Monarch New Gaia Senki	Claris	PS game	
1999	Athena ~Awakening from the ordinary life~	Rika Kashiwazaki	PS game	
2005	Eternal Aseria	Kyoko Misaki	PS2	
2006	FESTA!! -HYPER GIRLS POP-|Festa!	Mika Otonashi	PS2	
	Berserk		PS2	

=== Overseas dubbing ===
Series	Role	Notes	Source
Bob the Builder	Molly		
Without Evidence	Sandy		
The New Adventures of Madeline	Lulu		
