= Jura Tripper =

Japanese anime television series

- Dino Adventure Jurassic Tripper

恐竜冒険記ジュラトリッパー (Kyōryū Bōkenki Jura Torippā)
- Genre: Action, Adventure, Drama, Science fiction
- Anime television series
- Directed by: Kunihiko Yuyama
- Produced by: Noriko Kobayashi, Tatsuji Yamazaki, Hiroshi Kato, Mitsuru Ohshima, Koichi Sekizaki
- Written by: Yasushi Hirano
- Music by: Toshiyuki Omori
- Studio: Ashi Productions
- Original network: TV Tokyo
- Original run: April 2, 1995 – December 24, 1995
- Episodes: 39

Dino Adventure Jurassic Tripper (恐竜冒険記ジュラトリッパー, Kyōryū Bōkenki Jura Torippā) is the title of a 1995 anime series consisting of 39 25-minute episodes. It was produced by NAS and TV Tokyo and animated by Ashi Productions. It is a loosely based literary adaptation on the novel Two Years' Vacation (1888) by French author Jules Verne.

== Plot ==
During an excursion with the marine club, a group of children is transported to what is later revealed as the planet Noah, a strange world that holds both human inhabitants on the scientific level of the Middle Ages as well as various types of dinosaurs. They quickly make friends with talking Pteranodon Zans and Manua, an inhabitant of Noah, who helps them out on more than one occasion.

While trying to find a way back home, the children learn more about the new world they're in, discovering the people and dinosaurs suffer from oppression by the king as well as the church's prohibition of science. They get into conflict with General Mosar who is interested in their advanced technology and consequently have to flee from the king's army as well as the priests who try to capture Zans, who incidentally is the son of White Wing, the famous but passed leader of the rebellion.

== Characters ==
Kashira (ブリアン(カシラ), Burian (Kashira))
Voiced by: Masami Kikuchi

Although technically Shachou is their leader, Kashira usually takes charge in dire situations. While generally a good person, he is rarely serious and likes to fool around, occasionally so on the expenses of others, unintentionally angering them. He is very courageous, sporty and ready to take great risks in order to save his friends. Tends to fall for girls easily and flirts around without hesitation. Doesn't really get along with God.

Princess (姫, Hime)
Voiced by: Yūko Mizutani

Initially, she is God's fiancée; however, she insists on that it is a decision their parents have made and that she has not yet concurred. She is a bit spoiled, but has a good heart and sincerely cares for her friends (especially later in the series). She appears to be somewhat interested in Kashira.

Shachou (社長, Shachou)
Voiced by: Shin-ichiro Miki

Being the oldest of the group, Shachou is elected as their leader early on. However, since he is not very decisive, his tries of discussing over and voting on anything are usually undermined by the group. Although he is easily frightened and not as physically adept as the other boys, he will not hesitate to protect his friends. At first drawn towards Manua, he later takes interest in Tiger. Carries a mirror and a comb with him wherever he goes.

Tiger (タイガー, Taigā)
Voiced by: Yuri Amano

A bit of a tomboy, Tiger knows how to shoot and fight. She is the only one of the girls usually taking part in dangerous actions. Kashira once remarks that he would like his brother to be as strong as her. Nevertheless, she's also a romantic at heart. Does not like ghosts, thunderstorms and coldness. Develops feelings for Shachou towards the end of the series.

God (ドニファン(ゴッド), Donifān (Goddo))
Voiced by: Ryūzō Ishino

God is probably the most egoistic of the children. He is initially engaged with Hime, but she doesn't seem to approve too much. God usually opposes the others' opinions and decisions, especially in regard to Kashira. He joins General Mosar for a while, telling him how guns work. On a number of occasions, he tries to betray the group by running away alone or with Hime, Asuka or his followers Snake and O-Taku, but mostly without success. While he mostly acts foolishly selfish and gets the group in trouble, on rare occasions it is depicted that he actually does care for beings besides himself.

Snake (スネーク, Sunēku)
Voiced by: Tsutomu Kashiwakura

Snake is a sort of friend/underling of God and keeps following him around although God keeps scolding and punching him. When he's not under God's thumb he can act quite smart.

Tank (タンク, Tanku)
Voiced by: Wataru Takagi

A rather massive, but easy-going fellow who tries to act as a moderating voice and is quite skilled in cooking.

Doctor (博士, Hakase)
Voiced by: Michiko Neya

A typical meganekko, Hakase is tech-savvy and intelligent. Although she isn't talking much, she is far from shy and will raise her voice if necessary (i.e. if it's a topic she feels knowledgeable in).

O-Jou (お嬢, Ojou)
Voiced by: Mariko Kouda

A young girl who is Ben's romantic interest.

O-Taku (オタク, Otaku)
Voiced by: Tetsuya Iwanaga

O-Taku is God's younger brother, thus following him around most of the time, yet it is hinted that he does not concur with the majority of his actions. When idle, he is mostly seen playing videogames on his handheld. Takes a liking in O-Jou and thus dislikes Ben. Although he's not a principally bad person, he doesn't really follow altruistic motives either.

Beso (ベソ, Beso)
Voiced by: Daisuke Sakaguchi

Kashira's younger brother. He's nice and less reckless than his elder sibling. Fancies O-Jou.

Gacha (ガチャ, Gacha)
Voiced by: Rumi Kasahara

A young girl who is easily upset and tends to cry a lot. Obsessed with General Mosar whom she starts to call "uncle" as the show progresses.

Donmali (ダンマリ, Danmari)
Voiced by: Hiroko Takemasa

One of the younger kids and closest friend of Zans; usually carries him around.

Doji (ドジ, Doji) & Moji (モジ, Moji)
Voiced by: Minako Takenouchi & Junko Okada

Twin brothers who are probably the youngest members of the crew. One more shy and frightful, the other more reckless.

Zans (ザンス, Zansu)
Voiced by: Wataru Takagi

A speaking Pteranodon and son of White Wing, passed leader of the rebellion. He is cowardish and easily scared at first, but becomes more courageous as the story progresses and ultimately decides to become head of the rebels.

Mosar (モサール, Mosāru)
Voiced by: Yasunori Matsumoto

A dutiful general directly under the king's command, he opposes the church and instead deems the advanced technology of the children to be beneficial to his country. After he learns that the high priest is actually trying to take over the power and manipulates the king, he stops pursuit of the group and becomes an ally instead.

Manua (マニュア, Manyua)
Voiced by: Yumi Hikita

The daughter of a local mayor, she is very concerned about the current state of Noah, especially considering the suppression and torture of dinosaurs that are kept as slaves. When she meets with the children, she decides to leave her hometown and later joins the rebellion.

Mint (ミント, Minto)
Voiced by: Akira Ishida

A young inventor, he meets the children who see his (not working) flying machine. After they help him finish it, they quickly become friends. He later becomes the assistant of da Ponta, another famous inventor who has been exiled. Subsequently, Mint falls in love with Princess Asuka.

Burai (ブライ, Burai)
Voiced by: Tōru Furusawa

The leader of a group of bandits who are actually rebels against the king and the church. He and Manua take a liking in each other.

Asuka (アスカ, Asuka)
Voiced by: Mika Kanai

The spoiled, but truly lonely princess of Noah. She has a pet dino called Miyu/Myu. Initially, she is not very nice to the children, who are held captive in the palace, teasing them. But after a dressing-down from Kashira, they become friends and she helps them escape. Her interest shifts from Kashira first to Mint later on.

Ajali (アジャリ, Ajari)
Voiced by: Ai Orikasa

A priestess who does not view technology as evil and therefore aids da Ponta in his studies. Helps the kids on a number of occasions.

Hakushi

Dozu/Mozu

== Music ==
Opening Theme:

- "Bokutachi no Start" (僕たちのスタート, Bokutachi no Sutāto)
  Lyrics and composition by: CHIAKI
  Arrangement by: Akihisa Matsuura
  Song by: Hironobu Kageyama

Ending Theme:

- "Sunday Island"
  Lyrics and composition by: Yuki Kajiura
  Arrangement by: Akihisa Matsuura
  Song by: Mariko Kouda
