= Yadamon =

Japanese anime series (1992-93)

- Yadamon

ヤダモン
- Anime television series
- Directed by: Masuji Harada; Takashi Yui
- Studio: Group TAC
- Original network: NHK
- Original run: 24 August 1992 – 16 July 1993
- Episodes: 170
- Video game

Yadamon: Wonderland Dream
- Developer: Sting Entertainment
- Publisher: Tokuma Shoten
- Genre: Adventure
- Platform: Super Famicom
- Released: 26 November 1993
- Manga

Yadamon
- Written by: Suezen
- Published by: Tokuma Shoten
- Published: Animage
- Volumes: 2

Yadamon (ヤダモン) or Yadamon: Magical Dreamer is a 10-minute anime series created by Group TAC that originally ran between 24 August 1992 to 16 July 1993. The series was broadcast every weekday. In the 21-week first run, 110 episodes aired. A second series, with 60 episodes, aired in 1993 on NHK's Educational Channel. The characters were designed by Suezen. It stars Yadamon, a young and novice witch who flies by turning her hair into butterfly wings, rides a magical vacuum and has a talking manatee for a mentor.

== Plot ==
After causing havoc in the Witch Forest, the queen, Yadamon's mother, banishes her to human world. She does this not only to teach Yadamon a lesson, but also because she has a secret passion for human magazines and books. While at the human world, the queen keeps a close watch at Yadamon which becomes a problem because she falls asleep almost anywhere.

The human world has gone extremely hi-tech and many animals have become extinct. Yadamon finds herself in the island named Creature Island, where genetically re-created species are being made. In the island, she meets Jean and his parents Edward and Maria.

Yadamon meets many misadventures in the human world due to her curiosity which causes a lot of trouble to the humans and her guardian fairy, Timon, who has the ability to stop time (however, in doing so he shape shift into a clock and is unable to move till the transformation ends).

As Yadamon learns to adapt to human world and use her powers, a new threat is brewing. Kira, the evil witch who was sealed inside a volcano by the queen and the great witch Beril, has escaped. She is out for revenge and has set her eyes to the humans and Yadamon.

In the final series, it is revealed that the true origin of the mysterious egg which generate an evil copy of Yadamon which wishes to cause the apocalypse.

== Cast ==
- Mika Kanai as Yadamon
- Rie Iwatsubo as Taimon
- Rin Mizuhara as Jean
- Issei Futamata as Edward
- Mami Suzuki as Maria
- Youko Kawanami as Queen
- Yuuko Minaguchi as Kira
- Kaneto Shiozawa as Enrico/Fairy King
- Masahiro Anzai as Butch
- Ryuuji Saikachi as William
- Kyouko Minami as Hanna/Miiru
- Yasunori Matsumoto as Shinui
- Noriko Oka as Beril

== Episodes ==
No.	Title	Original release date
1	"A Little Witch Comes to Town No. 1"; Transliteration: "CHIBIkko majo ga yattekita No.1" (Japanese: チビッ子魔女がやってきた No.1)	August 24, 1992
2	"A Little Witch Comes to Town No. 2"; Transliteration: "CHIBIkko majo ga yattekita No.2" (Japanese: チビッ子魔女がやってきた No.2)	August 25, 1992
3	"A Little Witch Comes to Town No. 3"; Transliteration: "CHIBIkko majo ga yattekita No.3" (Japanese: チビッ子魔女がやってきた No.3)	August 26, 1992
4	"A Little Witch Comes to Town No. 4"; Transliteration: "CHIBIkko majo ga yattekita No.4" (Japanese: チビッ子魔女がやってきた No.4)	August 28, 1992
5	"A Little Witch Comes to Town No. 5"; Transliteration: "CHIBIkko majo ga yattekita No.5" (Japanese: チビッ子魔女がやってきた No.5)	August 31, 1992

== Video game ==
- Yadamon: Wonderland Dream (Super Famicom, 1993)
