= Bubu Chacha =

1999 and 2001 television anime

ぶぶチャチャ
- Genre: Comedy; Slice of life
- Anime television series
- Directed by: Tetsurō Amino
- Produced by: Katsuhiko Nozawa
- Written by: Akira Okeya
- Music by: Goji Tsuno
- Studio: Daume; Japan Digital Entertainment
- Original network: NHK
- Original run: April 29, 1999 – November 25, 1999
- Episodes: 26
- Anime television series

I Love Bubu Chacha!
- Directed by: Tetsurō Amino
- Produced by: Katsuhiko Nozawa
- Written by: Akira Okeya
- Music by: Goji Tsuno
- Studio: Daume; Japan Digital Entertainment
- Original network: NHK
- English network: CA: TVOKids; UK: GMTV2
- Original run: May 10, 2001 – November 29, 2001
- Episodes: 26

Bubu Chacha (ぶぶチャチャ, Bubu Chacha) is a Japanese slice of life anime series created by Akira Okeya (writer of Mobile Suit Gundam: The 08th MS Team and Transformers: Armada), Iku, Takeshi Anzai and Tetsuro Amino (director of Blue Comet SPT Layzner). Produced by Daume and Japan Digital Entertainment, the series was directed and written by Akira Okeya and produced by Katsuhiko Nozawa, the animation producer of Please Twins!. Character designs were done by Shinji Ochi, who did the character designs later on in Ichigeki Sacchu!! HoiHoi-san. The series first premiered on NHK from April 29, 1999, to November 25, 1999, with a total of 26 episodes.

A second season titled I Love Bubu Chacha! (だいすき! ぶぶチャチャ, Daisuki! Bubu Chacha) premiered two years later on NHK from May 10, 2001, to November 29, 2001, with a total run of 26 episodes. The first and/or the second season was also broadcast internationally on Disney Channel Asia (Asia Pacific), GMTV2 (United Kingdom), Raidue (Italy), TRT (Turkey), ABS-CBN (Philippines), Trans TV and Spacetoon (Indonesia), TVOKids (Canada) and Hero TV (Philippines). The animation studio itself later worked with Takeshi Anzai to produce the anime adaptation of Strawberry Marshmallow.

== Plot ==
Randy Rand is a curious 3-year-old boy who loves his pet dog named Chacha. One day, Randy is about to get hit by a car, when Chacha protects him and ends up dying. In a strange miracle the night after the accident, Chacha's spirit is reincarnated into a living yellow toy car so he can be with him all the time. The two became inseparable afterwards and have many adventures in which they learn valuable things in life. The story is set in Greenhill Town, which is loosely based on Los Angeles, California.

== Characters ==
Randy Rand (Buddy) (ランディ・ランド （ボク）, Randi Rando (Boku))
Voiced by: Yuko Sasamoto
Randy is a highly curious, 3-year-old boy who matures through his experiences and friendship with Chacha. Everything he sees interests him and learning about anything excites him. Though he never calls himself by name, his parents sometimes call him by his real name.
Chacha (チャチャ)
Voiced by: Chō
Chacha was once Randy's pet dog and best friend, guardian and teacher, who reincarnates as Randy's yellow toy car. He is very supportive and also looks after Randy's safety. Chacha and Randy love each other and like to go out. Randy's mother Connie had him since he was a puppy.
Connie Rand (Mom) (コニー・ランド, Konī Rando)
Voiced by: Atsuko Tanaka
Connie Rand is Randy's mother and Forest's wife, a loving and understanding mother who notices Randy maturing. Gardening is her hobby, and she had owned Chacha from when she was still a single woman.
Forest Rand (Dad) (フォレスト・ランド, Foresuto Rando)
Voiced by: Takuma Suzuki
Forest Rand is Randy's father and also Connie's husband. Being a journalist, Forest has a lot of information that gets Randy all excited. Forest loves toys and is very imaginative.
Mary (マリー, Marī)
Voiced by: Taeko Kawata
Mary is Randy's 4-year-old neighbour. She always behaves like a mature individual and thinks Randy is a little kid. She tries to teach him to grow up with much avail.
Catherine (キャサリン, Kyasarin)
Voiced by: Yumi Takada
Catherine is Randy's 14-year-old cousin who is occasionally asked to babysit Randy. She is part of a running gag in the series where she accidentally hits a post with her bike.
Nick (ニック, Nikku) and Terry (テリー, Terī)
Voiced by: Tomohiro Nishimura (Nick), Kōichi Sakaguchi (Terry)
Also known as the "Rap Brothers", Nick and Terry are 5 and 3 years old, respectively. They both bully Randy and Chacha and always speak in rap.
Uncle Daa (ダーッおじさん, Dā- ojisan)
Voiced by: Kinryū Arimoto
Uncle Daa is a man who works for pest control. He appears in every episode and shouts "daaaaaaaa!!" at kids. The children think he simply loves to scare them off, but he actually shouts at them when he feels they are in danger.
Tau Dinton (タウ・ディントン)
Voiced by: Omi Minami
Tau Dinton is an intelligent 5-year-old loner, who wears glasses and loves to read books. He moves to Greenhill Town, right across Buddy's house, and gradually opens up to Buddy and his friends.
Chip (チップ, Chippu)
Voiced by: Kōichi Sakaguchi
Chip is Tau's pet dog who just likes to run around wildly and bark. At first, Tau is not so fond of him, but as Chip improves his behavior, they become get closer. Chip loves ChaCha and Buddy as well.
Sarah (サラ, Sara)
Voiced by: Yū Hayami
Sarah is a 12-year-old human ghost living in the Ghost-apartment, and is a sister-like figure to Randy. She is almost the same age as Catherine, and is one of two people who knows Chacha is a dog.
Grandmother (おばぁちゃん, Obāchan)
Voiced by: Sayuri Sadaoka
Forest's mother, who lives in Cleverland. She is very close to Randy, close enough to almost understand that Chacha is a dog. She looks at nature as one of mankind's best friends, just like Randy.
Kana (カナ)
Voiced by: Asa Shirakura
Kana is a female cocker spaniel and Chacha's crush. She initially does not notice Chacha is a dog at first.
Hippo Truck (カバトラック, Kaba Torakku)
Voiced by: Hisao Egawa
Hippo Truck is one of Chacha's friends. He is a hippopotamus, who died and reincarnated into a giant truck. He is jealous of Chacha regarding Randy.
Bubu Pyoko (ぶぶピョコ)
Voiced by: Mika Kanai
Bubu Pyoko is another of Chacha's friends. He is a frog who met Randy's grandmother. His spirit had been reincarnated into Forest's old toy car which he had played with as a child.
Bull Robo (ブルロボ, Bururobo)
Voiced by: Hidenari Ugaki
Bull Robo is a bulldog and one of Chacha's friends. He has been Chacha's friend since before Randy was born. He first appears as a ghost, then reincarnates inside a toy robot.
Cindy (シンディ, Shindi)
Voiced by: Mako Hyōdō
Appearing in the second season, Cindy is a circus elephant, whose spirit had been reincarnated into a backhoe. She is physically strong, yet a little shy but ready to help people build anything.
Baby Leopard (ヒョウくん, Hyō-kun)
Voiced by: Junko Noda
Appearing in the second season, Baby Leopard is a leopard cub whose spirit had been reincarnated into a sports car. He likes to race around town.
Eyebrow Alien
Voiced by: Keiichi Sonobe
The leader of the Eyebrow Aliens, who came to earth from the Eyebrow Planet.
Papa Rat
Voiced by: Kōki Miyata
Papa Rat is the patriarch of a family of rats who had reincarnated into Tau Dinton's toy car. Papa Rat and his family still live in Tau's former house in Greenhill Town.

== Music ==
The series's music in both seasons was composed by Gori Tsuno, who did the soundtrack for Bakusō Kyōdai Let's & Go!!. Sound production of the anime was handled by Half HP Studio.

=== Theme Songs ===
Bubu Chacha

- Opening theme: "Bubu Chacha is unavoidable?" (ぶぶチャチャ仕方ない?, Bubuchacha shikatanai?)
  - Lyrics: Tetsurō Amino
  - Composition and arrangement: Tsuno Tsuyoshi
  - Artist: Makorin & Pythagoras
- Ending theme: "I Crossed the Bridge" (橋を渡ろう, Hashi o watarou)
  - Lyrics: Tetsurō Amino
  - Composition and arrangement: Tsuno Tsuyoshi
  - Artist: Makorin & Pythagoras

I Love Bubu Chacha

- Opening theme: "You and Bubu Chacha" (君のぶぶチャチャ, Kimi no Bubu Chacha)
  - Artist: Minako Kaneko
- Ending theme: "Everyone will Cross Over" (みんなわたろう, Minna watarou)
  - Artist: Minako Kaneko
