= Daume =

Japanese animation studio

- Native name: 株式会社童夢
- Romanized name: Kabushiki-gaisha Dōmu
- Company type: Kabushiki-gaisha
- Industry: Japanese animation
- Founded: 1986 (as Studio Daume); May 1993 (as Daume Co., Ltd.)
- Founder: Haruo Nakayama; Tomiko Yamamoto
- Defunct: 2016
- Headquarters: 2-37-12 Kami-Igusa, Suginami, Tokyo, Japan
- Key people: Takeshi Anzai (CEO)
- Website: Daume official site

Daume Co., Ltd. (Japanese: 株式会社童夢, Hepburn: Kabushiki-gaisha Dōmu) was a Japanese animation studio that was founded in 1986 by Haruo Nakayama and his wife, Tomiko Yamamoto, with Nakayama taking the role of president of the studio. In 1993, Takeshi Anzai became co-president with Nakayama; however, sometime in the next few years, Nakayama stepped down.

== Works ==
=== Television series ===
Year	Title	Director(s)	Animation producer(s)	Source	Eps.	Refs.
1999	D4 Princess	Yasunori Ide	Takeshi Anzai	Manga	24	
1999	Bubu Chacha	Tetsurō Amino	Producer: Katsuhiko Nozawa	Original work	26	
2001	I Love Bubu Chacha!	Tetsurō Amino	Producer: Katsuhiko Nozawa	Original work	26	
2001	Hanaukyo Maid Team	Yasunori Ide	Takeshi Anzai	Manga	12	
2002	Please Teacher!	Yasunori Ide	Katsuhiko Nozawa; Hiroshi Ishida	Original work	12	
2003	Please Twins!	Yasunori Ide	Katsuhiko Nozawa	Original work	12	
2004	DearS	Iku Suzuki	Takeshi Anzai	Manga	12	
2004	Hanaukyō Maid Team: La Verite	Takuya Nonaka		Manga	12	
2005	Strawberry Marshmallow	Takuya Satō	Takeshi Anzai; Daisuke Nishioka	Manga	12	
2006	Tona-Gura!	Tatsuya Abe	Takeshi Anzai; Daisuke Nishioka	Manga	13	
2006	Crescent Love	Masahiko Ohta	Takeshi Anzai	Visual novel	12	
2007	Minami-ke	Masahiko Ohta	Takeshi Anzai; Daisuke Nishioka	Manga	12	
2010	Shiki	Tetsurō Amino	Takeshi Anzai; Daisuke Nishioka	Novel	22	

=== OVAs ===
Year	Title	Director(s)	Animation producer(s)	Source	Eps.	Refs.
1994	The Irresponsible Captain Tylor (episodes 1–2)	Kōichi Mashimo		Light novel	2	
1996	Idol Janshi Suchie-Pai	Yasunori Ide	Producer: Takeshi Anzai	Manga	1	
1996	Debutante Detective Corps	Akiyuki Shinbo	Producer: Takeshi Anzai	Video game	1	
1999	Sorcerer on the Rocks	Kazuhiro Ozawa		Manga	2	
2001	Hanaukyo Maid Team	Yasunori Ide	Takeshi Anzai	Manga	3	
2002	Please Teacher!	Yasunori Ide	Katsuhiko Nozawa; Hiroshi Ishida	Original work	1	
2003	Please Twins!	Yasunori Ide	Katsuhiko Nozawa	Original work	1	
2004	Ichigeki Sacchu!! HoiHoi-san	Takuya Satō	Hiroshi Ishida	Manga	1	
2004	Le Portrait de Petit Cossette	Akiyuki Shinbo	Hiroshi Ishida	Original work	3	
2005	Strawberry Marshmallow: Episode 0	Takuya Satō	Takeshi Anzai; Daisuke Nishioka	Manga	1	
2005	DearS: Is It a Golden Ball?	Iku Suzuki	Takeshi Anzai	Manga	1	
2007	Koharu Biyori (2007)	Takayuki Inagaki	Takeshi Anzai; Daisuke Nishioka	Manga	3	
2007	Strawberry Marshmallow	Takuya Satō	Takeshi Anzai; Daisuke Nishioka	Manga	3	
2009	Strawberry Marshmallow Encore	Takuya Satō	Takeshi Anzai; Daisuke Nishioka	Manga	2	
2011	Shiki	Tetsurō Amino	Takeshi Anzai; Daisuke Nishioka	Novel	2	

=== Gross outsource works ===
Works in which Daume participated as a gross outsource (full outsource) studio, either for the whole series or for an episode.

- What's Michael? (1988–1989)
- The Heroic Legend of Arslan (1993, episodes 3–4, with Pierrot)

=== Video games ===
- Langrisser V (1998) - Opening animation
- BlazBlue: Central Fiction (2015) - Ending animation

== Current Status ==
After the end of Shiki, Daume ceased the production of titles as a major studio. The studio began taking on sub-contracting works for other companies and, as of April 2016, have withdrawn from the animation production business.

== Notable staff ==
=== Representative staff ===
- Haruo Nakayama (founder and president, 1986~???)
- Tomiko Yamamoto (founder)
- Takeshi Anzai (president, 1993~2015)

=== Animation producers ===
- Katsuhiko Nozawa (1997~2003, founded Remic)
- Hiroshi Ishida (1997~2004)
- Daisuke Nishioka (2000~2015, went to Wit Studio)

=== Animators ===
- Hisashi Abe (animator) (1990~1999)
- Yoshihiro Watanabe (199?~2007)
- Takaomi Kanasaki (???)
