= Vampire Princess Miyu =

Horror manga series

- First tankōbon volume cover of New Vampire Princess Miyu featuring Miyu

吸血姫 美夕 (Kyūketsuhime Miyu)
- Genre: Horror; Supernatural
- Manga
- Written by: Toshiki Hirano
- Illustrated by: Narumi Kakinouchi
- Published by: Akita Shoten
- English publisher: NA: Studio Ironcat
- Magazine: Suspiria
- Original run: 1988 – 2002
- Volumes: 10
- Original video animation
- Directed by: Toshiki Hirano
- Produced by: Kazufumi Nomura; Tōru Miura
- Written by: Shō Aikawa
- Music by: Kenji Kawai
- Studio: AIC
- Licensed by: AUS: Madman Entertainment; NA: AnimEigo; UK: Manga Entertainment
- Released: July 21, 1988 – April 1, 1989
- Episodes: 4
- Manga

Vampire Princess Yui
- Written by: Toshiki Hirano
- Illustrated by: Narumi Kakinouchi
- Published by: Akita Shoten
- English publisher: NA: Studio Ironcat
- Original run: 1990 – 1995
- Volumes: 5
- Manga

New Vampire Princess Miyu
- Written by: Toshiki Hirano
- Illustrated by: Narumi Kakinouchi
- Published by: Akita Shoten
- English publisher: NA: Studio Ironcat
- Magazine: Suspiria
- Original run: 1992 – 1994
- Volumes: 5
- Manga

The Wanderer
- Written by: Toshiki Hirano
- Illustrated by: Narumi Kakinouchi
- Published by: Akita Shoten
- English publisher: NA: Studio Ironcat
- Magazine: Horror Comics Special
- Original run: October 1996 – February 1997
- Volumes: 3
- Anime television series
- Directed by: Toshiki Hirano; Keitarō Motonaga (assistant)
- Produced by: Shigeto Yamazaki; Kazunori Takashiro
- Written by: Yuji Hayami
- Music by: Kenji Kawai
- Studio: AIC (Note: Production assistance (制作協力) for all episodes provided by Group TAC.)
- Licensed by: AUS: Madman Entertainment; NA: Maiden Japan; UK: MVM Films
- Original network: TV Tokyo
- Original run: October 6, 1997 – March 30, 1998
- Episodes: 26
- Manga

Vampire Yui: Kanonshou
- Written by: Toshiki Hirano
- Illustrated by: Narumi Kakinouchi
- Published by: Akita Shoten
- English publisher: NA: Studio Ironcat
- Magazine: Suspiria Mystery
- Original run: 2002 – 2005
- Volumes: 8
- Manga

Vampire Princess
- Written by: Toshiki Hirano
- Illustrated by: Narumi Kakinouchi
- Published by: SB Creative
- Magazine: Flex Comix Flare
- Original run: 2009 – 2012
- Volumes: 5
- Manga

Vampire Yui: Saishuushou
- Written by: Toshiki Hirano
- Illustrated by: Narumi Kakinouchi
- Published by: Akita Shoten
- Imprint: Champion Red Comics
- Magazine: Champion Cross
- Original run: November 28, 2017 – March 20, 2018
- Volumes: 2
- Manga

Vampire Miyu: Saku
- Written by: Toshiki Hirano
- Illustrated by: Narumi Kakinouchi
- Published by: Akita Shoten
- Imprint: Champion Red Comics
- Magazine: Champion Cross
- Original run: December 5, 2017 – September 9, 2020
- Volumes: 7
- Manga

Vampire Miyui
- Written by: Toshiki Hirano; Chiaki J. Konaka
- Illustrated by: Narumi Kakinouchi
- Published by: SB Creative
- Magazine: GA Comic
- Original run: January 31, 2025 – present

Vampire Princess Miyu (Japanese: 吸血姫(ヴァンパイア) 美夕, Hepburn: Vanpaia Miyu) is a Japanese horror manga series by Narumi Kakinouchi and Toshiki Hirano, as well as an anime adaptation by the same creators. The anime was originally adapted as a 4-episode original video animation (OVA) series released in 1988 and licensed by AnimEigo, and later as a 26-episode television series released in 1997 and licensed by Tokyopop and later Maiden Japan.

== Plot ==
The series takes place in Kyoto, and follows Miyu Yamano and her Western Shinma companion, Larva. The daughter of a human and a Shinma, Miyu was born a vampire and awakened as the Guardian. She is tasked with hunting down stray Shinma and sending them back to the darkness. Before she turns 15, she longs to return to the darkness herself, but not until she has banished the Shinma from Earth and learned who she truly is, as this information has been withheld from her since her awakening.

Most locations in the series evoke traditional Japan.

== Characters ==
Miyu and Larva, the two main characters, as depicted in the manga

=== Main ===
Miyu (美夕)
Miyu (OVAs) Voiced by: Naoko Watanabe (Japanese), Pamela Weidner-Houle (English, AnimEigo dub), Annemarie Zola (English, Manga Entertainment dub)
Miyu (anime) Voiced by: Miki Nagasawa (Japanese), Kimberly J. Brown (English, ep 1–7), Dorothy Elias-Fahn (English, ep 8–26)
A girl who appears to be around 13 or 15 years old, but is actually much older because she is a vampire. Her origins and personality differ between adaptations: in the OVAs, she is the child of a human father and a vampire mother in post–World War II Japan, while in the anime she is the child of a human mother and a Shinma father, who was the previous Guardian, in pre-World War II Empire of Japan. In the OVAs, Miyu is childish, manipulative, and playful, while in the anime, she is more reserved yet kinder. In both adaptations, Miyu becomes the Guardian, also known as the Watcher, after losing her parents. She has the power to teleport, levitate, open dimensional portals, and attack with fire. In the OVAs, she fights in several attires, while in most media, she usually wears a short pale blue kimono with a red ribbon around her right foot. Although she is a vampire and must drink blood to survive, Miyu is unharmed by sunlight, holy water, or crucifixes, and her reflection is visible, which may be because she is half human. She chooses her victims carefully, as she usually chooses those who have suffered loss and offers them to be with their loved ones in their dreams in exchange for their blood, putting them into an endless state of daydream or sleep. Miyu is protective of Larva and, in the manga, is implied to have feelings for him. In the anime, when she disguises herself as a human, she goes by the name Miyu Yamano (山野 美夕, Yamano Miyu).
Larva (ラヴァ, Rava)
Larva (OVAs) Voiced by: Kaneto Shiozawa (Japanese); Zach Hanner (English)
Larva (anime) Voiced by: Shin-ichiro Miki (Japanese); Ryan Alosio (English)
A Western Shinma. In the OVAs, he arrives to kill Miyu and prevent her vampire blood from awakening. However, after he accidentally triggers it and she drinks his blood after he lowers his guard, his face and voice are sealed behind a mask as punishment for his failure. In the anime, Larva confronts Miyu after she becomes the Guardian, but she drinks his blood after he defeats her. In both cases, Larva starts out as an unwilling ally, but later pledges to be by Miyu's side because he can sense her sorrow, such as during their blood-bond, and in the manga, it is implied that he has feelings for her. Larva can use his nails to attack and, in the anime, also wields a scythe. In the anime and manga, he can access Miyu's flame powers but rarely does so, saying it reminds him of his greatest defeat. Unlike in the OVAs, in the anime and manga, Larva can speak and remove his mask. His name is derived from the lemures of Roman mythology, who are also known as larvae; his mask may derive from the fact that "larvae" is Latin for "mask".
Shinma (神魔)

Shinmas are demons from another dimension called the darkness who possess the powers of shapeshifting and flight and take advantage of human souls for their own gain, luring them with illusions of their dreams or desires. After escaping into the human world after being sealed in the darkness for thousands of years, it is the job of a Guardian vampire, such as Miyu, to return them to the darkness. While it is implied that they feed on human emotions, there are some instances of Shinma feeding directly on humans, such as Ga-Ryu, who drinks blood, and Koh-Waku, who devours them. Not all Shinma are inherently evil, however. Some use their abilities to interfere with humans for their own purposes, while others help humans by targeting others. Shinma can come from several countries, including Japan, China, and the Western side. The kanji for Shinma literally means "god-demon".

=== OVA series characters ===
Himiko Se (瀬 一三子, Se Himiko)
Voiced by: Mami Koyama (Japanese); Stephanie Griffin (English)
A cynical, stubborn and knowledgeable spiritualist who meets Miyu during a job in Kyoto. Their paths cross throughout the series as Himiko searches for her, initially convinced that she is a monster with no redeeming qualities, but later changing her mind after learning more about her and Larva. At the end of the fourth OVA, Himiko is shocked to realize she met Miyu as a child. It is implied that she has vampiric traits that have yet to manifest, as she was the first human to exchange blood with Miyu after she became the Guardian.
Miyahito (都人)
Voiced by: Katsumi Toriumi (Japanese); Shaun O'Rourke (English)
Appearing in Episode 1, Unearthly Kyoto, he is a boy from Kyoto whom Himiko befriends. His girlfriend, Ryouko, was murdered by a "vampire", which he did not know was actually a Shinma, and he blames himself for being unable to protect her. Because of his grief, he later accepts Miyu's offer to exchange their blood, which Himiko witnesses. At the end of the episode, he is in a catatonic state; Miyu, disguised as a schoolgirl, tells a group of girls not to worry about him since he is happy now.
Aiko (藍子)
Appearing in Episode 1, Unearthly Kyoto, she is the only daughter of a rich, traditional family in Kyoto who has been in a coma for 60 days. Her parents call Himiko, believing her to be possessed, which Himiko confirms, but is unable to exorcise the demon and is attacked by a Shinma, but Miyu saves her. Himiko later learns that after Aiko and her parents were injured in a car accident, they donated their blood, which is implied to be hh blood, to save her life, after which she fell into a deep depression and blamed herself for their deaths. The "parents" that called Himiko were either ghosts or Shinmas, so she tries to exorcise Aiko again, and it is revealed that she made a deal with the Shinma that attacked Himiko, letting it roam in exchange for it recreating her former life, including her parents. Before Miyu banishes the Shinma, she tries to bite Aiko as she did to Miyahito, but Himiko interferes, and Aiko passes away after the Shinma is banished.
Ranka (爛火)
Voiced by: Mayumi Shō (Japanese); Belinda Bizic-Keller (English)
Appearing in Episode 2, A Banquet of Marionettes, she is a Shinma of the second tier who places the essences of her victims into life-size dolls and hides them in a school's warehouse in Kyoto so she can drain their life over time. She fell in love with a student at the school, Kei Yuzuki, in whom Miyu is also interested. Kei, who has grown tired of his mundane life, wishes to be with Ranka even after discovering that she had been using him. Since he voluntarily gave himself to Ranka and she fell in love with him, Miyu is forced to banish them both after she transforms him into a creature like her at his request. In the manga, Ranka is portrayed as an ally of Miyu and the ruler of the second tier of Japanese Shinma.
Lemures (レムレス, Remuresu)
Voiced by: Yūji Mitsuya (Japanese); Chad Carlberg (English)
Appearing in Episode 3, Fragile Armor, he is an old friend of Larva who seeks to release him from Miyu. He uses magic as well as a human who became a Shinma, with his soul trapped inside of a samurai armor. Miyu, believing that Lemures has targeted her to become the leader of the Shinma, confronts him with Himiko's help, but he seals Larva inside a wall. However, Larva breaks Lemures' spell after his puppet Shinma captures and injures Miyu. Instead of banishing Lemures into darkness, Miyu kills him with fire as punishment for kidnapping and harming Larva.

Lemures also becomes a recurring antagonist in the manga.

=== TV series characters ===
Chisato Inoue (井上 千里, Inoue Chisato)
Voiced by: Asako Shirakura (Japanese); Anjuli Cain (English)
Miyu's best friend at school and a student at Tokiwa School For Girls, who is unaware that she is a vampire or of her supernatural activities. In the final two episodes of the series, it is revealed that Chisato is a dormant stray Shinma and the main antagonist.
Shiina (死無)
Voiced by: Mika Kanai (Japanese); Francesca Catalano (English)
A Shinma who resembles a cartoonish bunny and is an ally of Miyu and Larva. Like all animal Shinma, she has one regular eye and one yellow eye usually covered by one of her ears; her yellow eye allows her to see great distances and dispel illusions.
Reiha (冷羽)
Voiced by: Megumi Ogata (Japanese); Wendee Lee (English)
A Yuki-onna who possesses the powers of levitation, teleportation, and manipulating wind and snow. Her widowed father, Kitjutsushi (鬼術師; Voiced by: Shigeru Chiba (Japanese); Jamieson Price (English)), was the leader of a group of Shinma protectors who were tasked with ensuring that a guardian would emerge during the Taishō period, which turned out to be Miyu. After the Bird Shinma, Black Kite, killed him, she discovered her ice powers after encountering a feasting Shinma. Since then, she has been Miyu's rival and has sought to destroy Shinma because she believes Miyu is not up to the job. She is less sympathetic than Miyu and is willing to kill those who stand in her way of destroying Shinma. After freezing the city, she and Miyu fight each other in a final confrontation. After Matsukaze's sacrifice, Reiha unleashes a blizzard that overwhelms Miyu before Larva breaks free and decapitates her. Her body, however, picks up her head and leaves, vowing to return one day and defeat Miyu.
Matsukaze (松風)
Voiced by: Megumi Ogata (Japanese); Mona Marshall (English)
Reiha's talking doll companion, who, like Reiha, is hostile towards Miyu. During Miyu and Reiha's final confrontation, Matsukaze uses his ice abilities to trap Larva in an ice barrier so Reiha can fight Miyu, and later sacrifices himself to protect Reiha from Miyu's flame attack.
Yukari Kashima (鹿島 由加里, Kashima Yukari)
Voiced by: Chiharu Tezuka (Japanese); Stephanie Denise Griffin (English)
Miyu and Chisato's classmate, who is tomboyish and protective of Hisae and Chisato. Chisato kills her and Hisae soon after they discover Miyu's true nature.
Hisae Aoki (青木 久恵, Aoki Hisae)
Voiced by: Kokoro Shindou (Japanese); Emmanuelle Chriqui (English)
Miyu and Chisato's classmate, who is shy and intelligent and loves to read. She senses something strange about Miyu and tries to investigate. However, Chisato kills her, and Yukari soon after discovers Miyu's true nature.

=== Manga characters ===
Yuma Koizumi
A human who fell in love with a Shinma. After Miyu banished the Shima to the darkness, she later teamed up with other Shinma to take revenge on Miyu. It is later revealed that Yuma spent the rest of her life pursuing Miyu in order to destroy her and, on her travels, encountered several characters from whom Miyu had drunk from in earlier chapters.
Yui (夕維)
The daughter of a human woman and a Shi, another type of demon, who physically appears to be twelve to thirteen years old. She is more shy and reserved than Miyu, and naive about the world. She is part vampire, as Miyu's blood runs in her veins after she fed on her mother while she was pregnant with Yui. Yui was drawn to Miyu's realm as part of a plan to resurrect her. Yui's weapon of choice is cherry blossoms, which she can manipulate; she grants this power to Miyu after giving up her own blood so Miyu can be resurrected. She is the protagonist of the spinoff manga series Vampire Princess Yui.
Nagi
A Shinma and Yui's protector, who cares deeply for her. Despite his short temper, he is a loyal companion and allows Yui to feed on him as she refuses to feed on humans.

== Cast ==
OVA series cast
Character		Japanese	English	
Character		Japanese	AnimEigo/ Swirl Films (1995)	Manga Entertainment/ World Wide Group (1997)
Principal cast
Narrator		Gorou Naya	David Stokes	
Himiko Se		Mami Koyama	Stephanie Griffin	
Miyu		Naoko Watanabe	Pamela Weidner-Houle	Annemarie Zola
Larva		Kaneto Shiozawa	Zach Hanner	
Episodic cast
1	Ryouko	Kiyoko Kobayashi	Connie Nelson	
1	Miyahito	Katsumi Toriumi	Shaun O'Rourke	
1	Female College Student	Rena Yukie	Sarah Wakild	
1	Clerk		Greg Taylor	
1	Police Captain		Steve Rassin	
1	Police Lieutenant		Mac Ingraham	
1	Aiko's mother	Youko Matsuoka	Hope Brownewell	
1	Aiko's father	Hidetoshi Nakamura	Turner Knox	
1	Doctor	Tesshou Genda	Lee Domenick	
1	Schoolgirl (1)		Amy Anderson	
2	Schoolgirl (2)		Amy Anderson	
2	Schoolboy		David Bjorkback	
2	Ranka	Mayumi Shou	Belinda Bizic-Keller	
2	Kei Yuzuki	Ryou Horikawa	Michael Granberry	
2	Giddy Schoolgirls	Hiromi Nakamura	Linda Carlisle Maggy Brownewell Regan Forman	
2	Kei's mother	Toshiko Asai	Ellen Lee-Seltz	
2	Kei's brother	Masato Kubota	Robert Wailes	
2	Kayo	Emi Shinohara	Linda Carlisle	
2	Shiba	Toshiya Ueda	Tom Maddis	
2	Kei's girlfriend	Yuya Yoshikawa	Shelby Reynolds	
3	Armor Monster	Tesshou Genda	Rick Forrester	
3	Lemures	Yuuji Mitsuya	Chad Carlberg	
3	Policeman	Morimasa Murakuni	Ralph Brownewell	
4	Miyu's father	Kiyonobu Suzuki	Bob Sayer	
4	Miyu's mother	Masako Ikeda	Melissa Stanley	
4	Schoolgirl (3)		Shannon Taylor	
4	Akiko	Yumi Takada	Jessica Watson	

== Media ==
=== Manga ===
==== Original series ====
No.	Japanese release date	Japanese ISBN
1	July 25, 1989	978-4-253-12662-5
2	April 5, 1998	978-4-253-12663-2
3	August 5, 1998	978-4-253-12664-9
4	January 5, 1999	978-4-253-12665-6
5	August 20, 1999	978-4-253-12682-3
6	April 30, 2000	978-4-253-12683-0
7	January 5, 2001	978-4-253-12684-7
8	July 15, 2001	978-4-253-12685-4
9	July 15, 2001	978-4-253-12686-1
10	June 30, 2002	978-4-253-12692-2

Spread out over ten volumes, this series storywise falls somewhere between the OAV and the television series. In this version, Ranka is the helpful second-tier Shinma, but Reiha is largely the same. Most volumes include several standalone stories regarding Miyu hunting and locating stray Shinma. However, there are several chapters in various volumes relating to the Western Shinma. In this version, it is Lemures who was Larva's companion previous to his coming to Japan. There is also Carlua, who is the daughter of Larva's adoptive uncle, Pazusu. Carlua is deeply in love with Larva (as is Lemures), but both fail in their attempts to "rescue" him from Miyu. These result in Lemures being banished to the darkness until after the events of New Vampire Miyu and Carlua being repelled, and her little sister Lilith being incinerated by Miyu. Additionally, there is a human girl named Yuma Koizumi, introduced in volume 4, who becomes a recurring antagonist. As a schoolgirl, Yuma was loved and marked by a Shinma named Tsubaki. Tsubaki belongs to a clan of Shinma called "Muma". When he starts to be hunted, Tsubaki is surprisingly accepting, although sad, at the fact that he will be parted from Yuma. However, when Miyu returns him to the dark, Yuma vows vengeance. With the help of Tsubaki's companions, Yuma attempts to kill Miyu, knowing Miyu would have difficulty attacking a human foe. The attack ultimately fails, and Yuma is left in her misery as Miyu refuses to feed from her (partly out of spite and partly out of respect for Tsubaki). In volume 10, it is discovered that Yuma spent the rest of her life pursuing Miyu and her mystery, but is never able to kill her. In the end, Miyu visits Yuma on her deathbed, finally drinking her blood.

The manga was licensed for a US release by Studio Ironcat; however, the company went out of business before the series was completed.

==== New Vampire Princess Miyu ====
titled 新・吸血姫美夕 (Shin Vanpaia Miyu) with "Shin" meaning "new"

This series comprises five volumes and covers the events that Miyu glimpses at the end of volume 10 of the original series. It takes place between the first two volumes of the original series. The Western Shinma, led by Pazusu, and supported by Carlua (his daughter), Lemunia (Lemures' younger brother), and a powerful young Shinma called Cait Sith. The Western Shinma succeed in kidnapping Larva, purging Miyu's blood from him, and sealing his memory of his time with her. This results in a showdown in which Larva kills Miyu, though he is not entirely certain why he feels bothered by it. In actuality, Miyu is not quite dead, as her spirit survives in the blood passed from Yui's mom to Yui in utero (see Vampire Princess Yui below). Yui is then drawn to Miyu's realm to help her be reborn. In the meantime, it's discovered that the "rescue mission" was all a ploy by Cait Sith to reach Japan and retrieve a short sword in which his mother's spirit is sealed. It is revealed that not only was his mother sealed by the Watcher before Miyu, but also that Cait Sith (both are members of a nearly extinct clan called the Quarl) was actually responsible for putting the idea of challenging the Eastern Shinma into Lemures' and Larva's heads originally. As Cait Sith succeeds in resurrecting the queen (though not without a catch and mortally wounding Pazusu), the race is on to get Yui safely to the spot of Miyu's rebirth. With the help of the second-tier Eastern Shinma and Lemunia, she succeeds, and Miyu is brought back to life. After unsealing Larva's memories and reestablishing the blood bond, Miyu and the remaining Western Shinma join forces to defeat the Quarl and destroy the Queen. Afterward, Pazusu asks Larva to kill him so he doesn't die of his wounds, and Carlua makes one last attempt to wrest Larva away from Miyu by threatening to kill him. Miyu calls her bluff, and Carlua retreats, thanks to the newly freed Lemures. He explains that, as they leave, during Miyu's time being dead, many stray Shinma (including himself) took advantage of her absence to escape the Darkness once more. The series ends with Miyu and Larva heading off to start rounding these escapees up again.

This series was also licensed by Studio Ironcat for an English-language release, but the company actually completed the series before going out of business.

==== Vampire Princess Yui ====
Yui is the daughter of a human and a Shi (another type of demon, also described as anti-Shinma in some English translations). She is also part vampire as Miyu's blood runs in her veins, as Miyu fed on her mother while pregnant with Yui. Miyu describes Yui as both her sister and her daughter. Yui has long, dark hair and looks to be about 12 or 13 years old. Like Miyu, Yui has a tragic past and friends she had to abandon upon her awakening. Yui faces the additional challenge of being hunted and supported by rival Shi factions that disapprove of her existence. Also like Miyu, Yui has a blood-bonded protector, a younger Shinma named Nagi. Yui's personality is much more shy and timid than Miyu's, and she is still largely naive about the world at large. Nagi is very hot-headed but a faithful companion, allowing Yui to feed on him because she refuses to feed on humans. Yui's weapon of choice is cherry blossoms, which she can bend to her will in a variety of ways. She passes this power to Miyu upon giving up her own blood for Miyu's rebirth.

Another series licensed by Studio Ironcat for an English-language release. Despite publishing the series in full as monthly comic installments, the company released only one collected volume before going out of business.

==== Vampire Yui: Kanonshou ====
The sequel to Vampire Princess Yui. A mysterious girl arrives at the door of a church covered in blood, crying out the name "Nagi" before collapsing. The church's priest takes in the silent, amnesiac girl and gently cares for her. Soon, the girl starts to have strange dreams about her past, dreams that name her as the Vampire Princess Yui.

Yui lives at a mountain church surrounded by sakura trees. Villagers in the area report vampire attacks.

Another series licensed by Studio Ironcat for an English-language release. Of the eight collected volumes, only one was published before the company went out of business.

==== Vampire Yui: Saishuushou ====
This series is the sequel to Vampire Yui: Kanonshou, serving as the "final chapter" of Yui's story. The series had two collected volumes that were released in June 2018.

==== Vampire Miyu: Saku ====
This series is about Miyu transferring to a certain middle school. It is described as "one of the earliest stories in the series, and it depicts the encounter and fateful bond between the protagonist Miyu and the vampire Lara," so it may be a prequel to the original manga. But it is more likely to be a separate continuity.

==== Vampire Miyui ====
This series features protagonists Miyu and Yui meeting for the first time.

=== Anime ===
AnimEigo originally released the OVA series on two VHS tapes in 1992, with separate editions containing English audio and English subtitles, each accompanied by a sheet of liner notes related to the series. The liner notes were eventually redone for the DVD release and included in Volume 1. The Volume 2 DVD includes a card with a humorous message stating that the complete liner notes are available in the first volume and that if no insert were included in the second volume, consumers would undoubtedly start complaining. In the UK, the series was licensed by Manga UK, which produced an alternate English dub for VHS (this dub was also shown on the British Sci-Fi Channel). However, AnimEigo's dub was used for the UK DVD release.

Tokyopop originally released the TV series on VHS and DVD in 2001–2002. The first DVD volume of their release is notable for retaining only the opening of episode 1 and the end credits of episode 3. This practice, which was fairly common in the VHS era of anime releases, apparently received significant criticism, as the remaining five DVDs were released with all episodes featuring the opening and ending credit sequences.

Tokyopop's license later expired, and the series was re-licensed by Maiden Japan in 2013, which re-released the series in one box set.

== Reception ==
Critical reception of the Vampire Princess Miyu OVA series has been generally positive. Anime News Network praised the OVA series for its "dark, surreal tour of the occult", while it criticizes the dub, saying "the casting was off-center". Overall, the English dub was given a C− and the subtitled version was given an A−. Raphael See of THEM Anime Reviews gave the OVA series a rating of 4 out of 5 stars, praising the animation, art, action scenes, story, and soundtrack but criticized the backgrounds, saying that they were "a bit on the sketchy side."

Critical reception of the Miyu TV series has also been generally positive. Jeremy A. Beard of THEM Anime Reviews gave the series a rating of 3 out of 5 stars, praising the characters, atmosphere, soundtrack, character and Shinma designs, and the story, but criticized the show for having too much unnecessary filler, stating that "I think that if Vampire Princess Miyu was only 13 episodes long, it would have been a better experience overall. The main plot episodes are the most enjoyable and it would not have seriously harmed the show to cut out a lot of the more extraneous Shinma hunts." Another reviewer from THEM Anime Reviews, Carlos Ross, also gave the Miyu TV series a rating of 3 out of 5 stars, praising the story, soundtrack, and voice actors, but noted that the animation was a step down from the OVA series, and criticized the Sailor Moon-style "Monster-of-the-Day" formula of the series. Overall, Ross concludes that "this is no Goosebumps story, folks. This can be really creepy, and it's definitely not for the under-twelves." Cody J. Riebe of PopMatters gave the Miyu TV series a positive review, praising the story, soundtrack, atmosphere, and animation, with his only criticisms being the series' first episode and the poor localization by Tokyopop. Riebe also notes that the series never gained any traction in Western regions, stating that "the real tragedy of Vampire Princess Miyu is that one of the more interesting series of the '90s is out of print and largely reduced to a horror anime footnote."

Erica Friedman from Okazu in her review of the spin-off manga Vampire Princess noted that this part of the series is close enough to the fact that it could be interpreted as yuri, and the relationship between the two main characters as a kind of sexual seduction, also pointing at obvious homoerotism of the image of vampirism in the work. At the same time, reviewing the anime adaptation of the original series, she described the end of the series as "Volume 6 of Vampire Princess Miyu answers a lot of questions. But it answers those questions in the bizarrest and least logical way, for which I give it a lot of credit", while noting absence of any romantic resolution or even confirmed affection in the work.

== See also ==
- Vampire film
- List of vampire television series
