= Yuji Hayami =

Japanese writer

Yuji Hayami (早見 裕司, Hayami Yūji; born 1961) is a Japanese science fiction and fantasy writer.

== Life ==
Born in Aomori Prefecture, he started writing in 1982 for SF Izumu magazine. Afterwards he collaborated on a number of published works. In 1988 he published his first novel, Summer Road (Natsukaidô-Samârôdo), followed by various other fantasy books, often set in large cities or characterized by a surreal streak.

Hayami also worked on a number of novelizations of science fiction or horror manga and anime. In the latter field, his work on the tie-ins for the anime series Vampire Princess Miyu became so popular that the original characters and situations were in later entries of the series modified to account for his personal additions to the canon.
