= Uchi no Sanshimai =

Japanese manga and anime television series

うちの3姉妹
- Manga
- Written by: Pretz Matsumoto
- Published by: Takeshobo
- Magazine: Manga Club; Suku Suku Paradise
- Original run: October 2005 – April 2011
- Volumes: 16
- Anime television series
- Produced by: Masakazu Washida; Takehiro Miyazaki (Tokyu Agency); Uk Jeong (Daewon Media); Hun Gyeongsa Jo (Studio Animal)
- Music by: Hiroyuki Takei
- Studio: Toei Animation; Studio Animal
- Original network: TXN (TV Tokyo)
- English network: IN: Pogo
- Original run: April 4, 2008 – December 28, 2010
- Episodes: 141

Uchi no Sanshimai (Japanese: うちの3姉妹; lit. "The 3 Sisters in My Family"), also known as "My 3 Daughters", is a Japanese manga series written and illustrated by Pretz Matsumoto from October 2005 to April 2011, which later became an anime television series from April 4, 2008, until December 28, 2010.

== Staff ==
- Script: Jin Tanaka, Naoki Koga, Michiyo Yamamoto, Midori Kashiwagi, Akari Tsukino, Yuta Urasawa, Isao Murayama, Hiroyuki Kurokawa, Masayuki Odajima, Takeshi Mabuchi, Yoichi Takahashi, Ayako Ogata, Mutsumi Ito
- Storyboards: Iku Ishiguro, Satoru Iriyoshi, Yuki Kinoshita, Kenji Yokoyama, Hiro Matsusaka, Naotoshi Shida, Naoyuki Itō, Sayo Aoi, Eisaku Inoue, Toru Yamada, Kiyotaka Isako, Tetsuaki Matsuda
