= Barasui =

Japanese manga artist

- Born: January 29, 1980 (age 46); Hamamatsu, Japan
- Occupation: Manga artist
- Known for: Strawberry Marshmallow

Barasui (ばらスィー, Barasuī; born January 29, 1980) is the pseudonym of a Japanese manga artist. He is most known for the manga series Strawberry Marshmallow, which has been made into an anime series and OVA. He also had a part in the Weekly Dearest My Brother series.
