= D4 Princess =

Japanese manga series

D4プリンセス (D4 Purinsesu)
- Genre: Magical Girl, Mecha, Comedy
- Manga
- Written by: Shotaro Harada
- Published by: MediaWorks
- Magazine: Dengeki Daioh
- Original run: 1998 – 2000
- Volumes: 4
- Anime television series
- Directed by: Yasunori Ide
- Music by: Kenji Kawai
- Studio: Daume
- Original network: WOWOW
- Original run: April 6, 1999 – September 28, 1999
- Episodes: 24

D4 Princess (D4プリンセス, D4 Purinsesu) is a manga series created by Shotaro Harada (原田将太郎, Harada Shōtarō). The story was adapted into an anime series. The anime is composed of 24 thirteen-minute episodes and is part of the anime program Anime Complex II; it ran from April 6 to September 28, 1999.

== Summary ==
A panzer is a powerful costumed fighter who uses a "tool" (ツール, it can be a power tool, a hand tool, or a household appliance) as a weapon. Anybody who wants to be a panzer can easily buy a kit that is currently mass-produced. As a result, one in ten people is a panzer. Doris Rurido is one of those panzers.

Thirteen-year-old Doris comes from a family that owns an advertising firm and has lived a very utopic lifestyle, even regarding herself as a princess. But when she attends the all-girls Teito Academy (帝都学園, Teitou Gakuen) which is known for its Panzer League, she not only faces very new things as a typical rich girl such as junk food, the lack of servants, and studying in school, but also faces challenges as a panzer, especially her inexperience and small stature.

To help Doris advance as a panzer, her sister Doria came over and gave her training sessions that to Doris were "very mean". During a break in training, Doris was challenged by a panzer known as "Raging Beetle", who uses a pair of large hedge trimmers as weapons.

A panzer fight consists of two thirty-minute rounds, each with a field giving an advantage to one of the two contending panzers. The panzer that knocks out the other wins. A panzer can also win on points.

Their first encounter was a disaster as Doris, billed as "Drill Princess", was overwhelmingly routed by Raging Beetle. Due to her loss, Doris was being mocked by other students. Not taking the stares any longer, she demanded a "revenge match" against Raging Beetle. The rematch was set and Doris won on that return match.

Doris then faced a fighter dubbed "Tornado Motor", who uses a vacuum cleaner as a weapon of choice. Despite an injured hand from trying to open and close a hard-to-turn faucet, Doris not only managed to drive her drill through solid steel, but also managed to transform into a sexier and more powerful fighter without her awareness, winning the fight in the process.

Thinking that she was strong enough to face her dream opponent, Nejiru Gaou, Doris confronted her and verbally gave her challenge to fight her—one that Nejiru accepted. Despite Doria's best efforts to stop it (knowing that Doris was not yet worthy to face Nejiru), the match was set anyway. Doris's progress as a panzer and Nejiru's rustiness after a long absence figured in that bout, which ended on a draw based on points.

Nejiru was fatally injured while she and Doris were rescuing some construction workers from a collapsing structure using their powers as panzers. Knowing she failed to rescue Nejiru, Doris was overcome with guilt and grief as she is the only person outside the Gaou family to remember Nejiru. But she found enough courage and some solace from Nejiru's little sister Nejiri to continue her quest to be a good panzer.

== Characters ==
Doris Rurido (瑠璃堂どりす, Ruridō Dorisu)
Voiced by: Masayo Kurata
Being the third daughter of the family who owns Rasen Advertising, she has yet to adjust to life outside her home. She always clutches a little star which turns into a hand drill once she puts on her hand as a weapon whenever she turns into a panzer. She is billed as "Drill Princess" (which explains the title — the "D" in "D4" stands for drill as well as the fact that she as well as her mother and sisters start their names with a "D", while the "4" signifies that she is the fourth member of the family to do so). Furthermore, her surname "Rurido" is doriru (ドリル) or drill pronounced backwards. Also, even though her name is written in hiragana, fansubbers prefer to call her Doris because of its Western nature.
Doria Rurido (瑠璃堂どりあ, Ruridō Doria)
Voiced by: Kikuko Inoue
Doris's very nice and doting yet "very mean" older sister. She comes to Doris's aid to help her by giving training sessions that to Doris are brutal. But the training is actually from experience; Doria is a panzer, too, but her panzer name is never mentioned in the anime.
Tsubasa Ginno (銀乃つばさ, Ginno Tsubasa)
Voiced by: Midori Kawana
Doris's friend, seatmate, and roommate. An ordinary girl who looks out on Doris, both on her school life and well as her life as a panzer. Doris refers to her as Gin-chan (銀ちゃん).
Nozomi Aino (愛野のぞみ, Aino Nozomi)
Voiced by: Yoko Asada
Tsubasa's best friend. An ordinary girl who became friends with Doris through Tsubasa and also looks out for Doris. Doris refers to her as Ai-chan (愛ちゃん).
Nejiru Gaou (我王ねじる, Gaō Nejiru)
Voiced by: Hiroko Konishi
The second-year student whom Doris regards as her dream opponent, as she is the first panzer Doris encountered in Doris' first day in Teito. Nejiru is feared by other panzers not because of her skill, but because of her destructive power. Her last bout six months before ended with the death of her opponent; since then, she is labeled as a satsuriku (殺戮) or murderer, and therefore an outcast. Her name literally means "to twist" which explains why she, like Doris, uses a drill as a weapon. She is billed as "Bloody Drill".
