= Strawberry Marshmallow =

Japanese manga series

- Volume 1 of the English version of the manga

苺ましまろ (Ichigo Mashimaro)
- Genre: Comedy, slice of life
- Manga
- Written by: Barasui
- Published by: ASCII Media Works
- English publisher: AUS: Madman (formerly); NA: Tokyopop (formerly); UK: Tokyopop (formerly)
- Magazine: Dengeki Daioh
- Original run: February 15, 2002 – present
- Volumes: 9
- Anime television series
- Directed by: Takuya Satō
- Written by: Takuya Satō
- Music by: Takeshi Watanabe
- Studio: Daume
- Licensed by: NA: Sentai Filmworks
- Original network: TBS, Anime Network
- Original run: July 14, 2005 – October 13, 2005
- Episodes: 12
- Video game
- Developer: ASCII Media Works
- Publisher: ASCII Media Works
- Genre: Visual novel
- Platform: PlayStation 2
- Released: August 11, 2005
- Original video animation
- Directed by: Takuya Satō
- Written by: Takuya Satō
- Music by: Takeshi Watanabe
- Studio: Daume
- Licensed by: NA: Sentai Filmworks
- Released: February 23, 2007 – April 25, 2007
- Runtime: 25 minutes each
- Episodes: 3
- Original video animation

Ichigo Mashimaro Encore
- Directed by: Takuya Satō
- Written by: Takuya Satō
- Music by: Takeshi Watanabe
- Studio: Daume
- Licensed by: NA: Sentai Filmworks
- Released: January 23, 2009 – March 25, 2009
- Runtime: 27 minutes each
- Episodes: 2

Strawberry Marshmallow (Japanese: 苺ましまろ, Hepburn: Ichigo Mashimaro) is a Japanese manga series written and illustrated by Barasui about the adventures of four elementary school girls and their older sister-figure. It began serialization in ASCII Media Works' manga magazine Dengeki Daioh in 2002. In 2005, the manga was adapted into an anime television series and a PlayStation 2 video game. Three original video animation (OVA) episodes were later released from February to April 2007. Another two-episode OVA project titled Ichigo Mashimaro Encore was released in 2009. The manga's tagline is "Cute is justice".

There is an unrelated manga by Touko Mizuno with the similar title of Ichigo Mashumaro (苺ましゅまろ).

== Plot ==
=== Themes ===
According to the manga, Strawberry Marshmallow is set in Hamamatsu, Japan. Seasons play an important role throughout Strawberry Marshmallow as the characters are involved in many normal seasonal activities.

The series is speckled with numerous small, music-related allusions, such as Ana's dog Frusciante being named after John Frusciante of the Red Hot Chili Peppers, while episode eight of the anime sees two goldfish called Richard and James (with Aphex Twin appearing in other comics by Barasui as well). Other referenced musicians include Radiohead, Sigur Rós, the Bee Gees, Oasis, Moby, Outkast, The Police, Arctic Monkeys, The Black Eyed Peas, and Squarepusher. The title itself was inspired by "Mashimaro", a single by Japanese rock artist Tamio Okuda.

Cover of The Strawberry Marshmallow Drama CD Volume 3. The characters, from left to right: Nobue, Miu, Matsuri, Ana, Chika, and Satake (the dog).

=== Characters ===
Nobue Itoh (伊藤 伸恵, Itō Nobue)
Voiced by: Hitomi Nabatame (Japanese); Carol-Anne Day (English)
Nobue is the oldest main character. She is Chika's older sister and usually has final authority on all matters. She often tries to "borrow" money from Chika to buy cigarettes. Nobue is perpetually searching for a part-time job to earn money for more cigarettes to calm her nicotine addiction. She has been described as a kogal.
The story suggests that Nobue derives some kind of sensual pleasure from watching the girls do cute things. In this respect, Nobue appears to appreciate the moe aesthetic. It is seen during the anime that Nobue prefers Matsuri and Ana over Chika and Miu.
The character of Nobue was changed between the original manga and its anime adaptation. In the manga, she is a sixteen-year-old high school freshman, while in the anime she is a twenty-year-old junior college student. In the first episode of the anime, she initially introduces herself as sixteen, intended to be a joke (and reference to the manga) as she quickly states that she is really twenty. The presumed reason for the change is that both smoking and drinking are not legal in Japan until age twenty.
She tends to act somewhat less mature in her manga incarnation, doing things such as tricking Matsuri into thinking that Miu is dead. Her appearance changes radically in the early stages of the manga, especially her hair, which goes from blonde to dark brown; in the anime, it is black.
Chika Itoh (伊藤 千佳, Itō Chika)
Voiced by: Saeko Chiba (Japanese); Wendy Morrison (English)
Chika is one of two twelve-year-olds in the story. She is the same age as Miu, and attends the same class as her neighbor Miu. Chika is a cheerful girl who shows more common sense than the other girls. Her main role in the series is that of an average, twelve-year-old girl, which is emphasized in the first manga volume, where her older sister Nobue describes Chika as specializing in "being totally generic." Her special skill is cooking, especially baking cookies. Her nickname is "Chi-chan" (ちぃちゃん) or just "Chi" (ちぃ).
Miu Matsuoka (松岡 美羽, Matsuoka Miu)
Voiced by: Fumiko Orikasa (Japanese); Caitlynne Medrek (English)
Miu is another twelve-year-old girl who is depicted in the story as having a problem child personality. A childhood friend of Chika, she lives next door to the Itoh house and is in the same class at school as Chika. Miu enjoys saying random things out of the blue and often plays pranks on Matsuri and Ana, but is most of the time interrupted by Nobue (and sometimes by Chika), resulting in her lying face-down on the floor. She has the least common sense or manners of the girls and is rarely taken seriously because of her strange ideas and comments. She seems to harbor some sort of jealousy of Ana and Matsuri due to the fact that Nobue finds them cuter. She tends to have no delicacy and often does things that bother people around her. Her nickname is "Micchan" (みっちゃん). Miu has been described as "Yotsuba Koiwai with fangs".
While she is often causing trouble for the other girls, an interview with the cast that was published in volume 4 of the manga series reveals that Miu is extremely fond of Chika, whom she dubs as her "one and only". The interview also states that Miu derives satisfaction from amusing Chika, and that she will never go to bed before making sure that Chika's room light is turned off. Light yuri themes between Miu and Chika occasionally appear in the manga.
Matsuri Sakuragi (桜木 茉莉, Sakuragi Matsuri)
Voiced by: Ayako Kawasumi (Japanese); Kylie Beaven (English)
Matsuri is an eleven-year-old, glasses-wearing girl. She is depicted as having a very timid personality, and is often the subject of Miu's teasing, which often results in her crying and hiding behind Nobue. She is one grade below Chika and Miu, and in the same class as Ana, with whom she quickly becomes friends. She has a pet ferret named John. After discovering that Ana can speak Japanese fluently, she helps her hide both her Japanese language skills and her lack of English ability from the rest of their class. While she has gray hair in the anime, her hair is white in the manga.
Ana Coppola (アナ・コッポラ, Ana Koppora)
Voiced by: Mamiko Noto (Japanese); Katie Rowan (English)
Ana is an eleven-year-old girl who originally moved from Cornwall, England five years before the beginning of the series, but seems to have forgotten how to speak English. She initially pretends that she speaks only English, but it is not long before she is discovered by Matsuri while speaking very polite Japanese. Matsuri tries to help her re-learn English. Ana is often teased by Miu because of her last name, which in Japanese sounds like a typical psychomime (a form of onomatopoeic sound). As such, Ana dislikes her last name and becomes angry when Miu calls "Coppola-chan". Miu also often writes her name in kanji using the characters for "hole", "bone", or "cave" (穴; 骨; 洞). Ana's "proper Japanese" personality is seen in her traditionally feminine and polite speaking style; together with her impressive knowledge of Japanese words, customs, and traditions, this makes her seem "more Japanese" than most native Japanese people (a fact which she also tries to hide). Later in the series, her ability to speak Japanese is discovered by the other students in her class. Ana owns a pet dog named Frusciante.

== Media ==
=== Manga ===
Nobue's character design evolved rapidly in the first volume before achieving a stable model for the rest of the series.

The Ichigo Mashimaro manga, written and illustrated by Barasui, began serialization in ASCII Media Works's Dengeki Daioh magazine on February 15, 2002. The first tankōbon was released on January 27, 2003, and nine volumes have been released as of February 2023. The French company Kurokawa has an ongoing license of the manga under the title Les petites fraises, while Siam Inter Comics publishes the series in Thai. Tokyopop previously licensed the series for publication in the United States (in English, as Strawberry Marshmallow) and in Germany (in German, as Erdbeeren & Marshmallows), but the series was canceled in 2008 after five English volumes and four German ones due to low sales, and is now out of print.

Early chapters of the manga break the fourth wall, especially in the first volume, where Chika often turns to face the readers when describing her plight. The manga's serialization is ongoing and publishes on an irregular basis, with an inconsistent number of pages per issue.

==== Volume list ====
No.	Original release date	Original ISBN	English release date	English ISBN
1	January 27, 2003	4-8402-2292-4	July 11, 2006	978-1-59-816494-7
2	July 26, 2003	4-8402-2445-5	November 7, 2006	978-1-59-816495-4
3	March 27, 2004	4-8402-2623-7	March 13, 2007	978-1-59-816496-1
4	May 28, 2005	4-8402-2981-3	July 10, 2007	978-1-59-816497-8
5	April 27, 2007	978-4-8402-3872-4	June 8, 2008	978-1-42-780469-3
6	February 27, 2009	978-4-04-867634-2	–	—
7	March 27, 2013	978-4-04-891453-6	–	—
8	November 27, 2017	978-4-04-893394-0	–	—
9	February 27, 2023	978-4-04-914774-2	–	—

=== Anime ===
A 12-episode Strawberry Marshmallow anime series produced by Daume and directed by Takuya Satō aired in Japan between July 14 and October 13, 2005, on the TBS Japanese television network. A 4-minute special was also broadcast prior to the start of the series. The anime series was licensed for English language distribution by Geneon. Three original video animation (OVA) episodes were later released between February 23 and April 25, 2007. A two-episode OVA series titled Ichigo Mashimaro Encore was released between January 23 and March 25, 2009. After going out of print due to the shutdown of Geneon's anime division, the series (including both OVAs) was later re-licensed by Sentai Filmworks.

=== Audio CDs ===
Five Ichigo Mashimaro drama CDs were released between July 22, 2005, and August 25, 2006, on the Frontier Works record label. They use the same voice actresses as the anime. There have also been four character song singles (one for each girl except Nobue), two soundtrack albums for the original anime, multiple "Toy CDs," and two soundtrack albums for the OVA.

=== Visual novel ===
Screenshot from the visual novel featuring Matsuri.

The visual novel, under the original title of Ichigo Mashimaro, was developed by ASCII Media Works for the PlayStation 2 based on the series under an all-ages CERO rating. The game was first released on August 11, 2005 and was re-released on March 8, 2007, at a lower price. Players take on the role of a college student, a childhood friend of Nobue who has come to visit. Over the course of a month, he gradually gets to know one of the girls and begins to go on dates with them.

=== Differences between media ===
There are several, large differences between the manga and anime versions of the series such as the much earlier introduction of Ana in the anime than the manga. In the manga, Ana does not appear until the second volume, while she makes her debut in the second episode of the anime. Events that take place in the manga never appeared in the anime, and chapters that were adapted were mixed together or were altered. For example, episode seven of the anime, "Going to the Sea", mixes elements of volume 1 manga "episodes" (chapters) nine ("Critical Investigation") and ten ("Beach Challenge"). While Ana is present in the anime episode, she had not yet made an appearance in the first volume of the manga.

Character designs were extremely inconsistent in the early stages of the manga, before Barasui knew that Strawberry Marshmallow would become a series, a fact referenced at the end of the first volume. Character designs are even more inconsistent with the visual novel, which uses a mix between the manga and anime's styles along with its own unique changes. For example, Matsuri has blonde hair in the visual novel, while she has white or gray hair in other mediums. Early chapters of the manga also had Miu drawn almost identical to Chika, with their hair length being the only visible difference between them.

In addition, some of the girls' personalities are slightly different in each media: Matsuri is shown to be a little more defensive in the manga than her anime counterpart, which is demonstrated by her slapping or shoving Miu away when the latter goes overboard with her pranks, while she never (deliberately) retaliates against Miu in the anime. There are also subtle differences in Miu and Chika's personalities between the manga and the anime, e.g. Miu is more random and unpredictable in the manga compared to her anime counterpart. Chika is also targeted by Miu more often in the manga compared to the anime (but not as much as Matsuri), resulting in more outbursts of anger from her in the manga.

== Reception ==
Strawberry Marshmallow has received positive reviews in English. Carlo Santos from Anime News Network has described Strawberry Marshmallow as "a clever little comedy that delivers laughs via its straight-faced approach" and has mentioned that "There is something uniquely appealing about Marshmallow's deadpan delivery". Dirk Deppey from The Comics Journal stated that "Barasui sets up his comic situations with little if any extraneous padding and plays out the resulting gags with the skill and grace of a master craftsman". The phrase "cute girls doing cute things", often a subgenre of the slice of life genre, was used to describe the series as early as 2004.

Erica Friedman of Yuricon has called the series "too-cute-to-hate", but criticized the now out-of-print English language publication of the manga for not providing any translations for sound effects, and for not providing explanations for some puns. Jason Thompson, writing about The Last Uniform for the appendix to Manga: The Complete Guide, contrasts the two series and calls Strawberry Marshmallow "purely juvenile gaze-into-the-girls-world stuff".
