= List of Naruto: Shippuden episodes =

Episodes of Japanese anime series

Naruto: Shippuden is an anime television series mainly adapted from Part II of Masashi Kishimoto's original Naruto manga series, with exactly 500 episodes. It is set two and a half years after the original series in the Naruto universe, following the teenage ninja Naruto Uzumaki and his allies. The series is directed by Hayato Date, and produced by Pierrot and TV Tokyo. It began broadcasting on February 15, 2007, on TV Tokyo, and concluded on March 23, 2017.

On January 2, 2009, Viz Media and Crunchyroll provided eight English subtitled Naruto: Shippuden episodes on the official Naruto website. Later the following 2 weeks, Viz began providing subtitled versions of the latest Naruto: Shippuden episodes a week after they first aired in Japan, with a new episode being added to the Naruto website each subsequent Thursday. On July 24, 2009, Viz Media announced that the series would be released on the iTunes Store. The first DVD release of the series in North America was released on September 29, 2009. The English dub of Naruto: Shippuden made its US premiere on Disney XD on October 28, 2009.

Naruto: Shippuden stopped airing on Disney XD on November 5, 2011, after 98 episodes. The English dub was streamed on the Neon Alley web channel from its launch in October 2012, and beginning December 29 of the same year with episode 99, dubbed episodes premiered every week until March 25, 2016, after 338 episodes, about a month before Neon Alley's closure. Adult Swim's Toonami programming block began airing the anime from the beginning on January 5, 2014, restarting from Episode 1, in an uncut format. The network started showing never before aired dubbed episodes at the 339th episode mark by May 2021 to September 2024.

== Series overview ==
Season	Episodes	Originally released	
Season	Episodes	First released	Last released
1	32	February 15, 2007	October 25, 2007
2	21	November 8, 2007	April 3, 2008
3	18	April 3, 2008	August 14, 2008
4	17	August 21, 2008	December 11, 2008
5	24	December 18, 2008	June 4, 2009
6	31	June 11, 2009	January 14, 2010
7	8	January 21, 2010	March 11, 2010
8	24	March 25, 2010	August 26, 2010
9	21	September 2, 2010	January 27, 2011
10	25	February 10, 2011	July 28, 2011
11	21	July 28, 2011	December 28, 2011
12	33	January 5, 2012	August 16, 2012
13	20	August 23, 2012	January 10, 2013
14	25	January 17, 2013	July 4, 2013
15	28	July 18, 2013	January 30, 2014
16	13	February 6, 2014	May 8, 2014
17	11	May 15, 2014	August 14, 2014
18	21	August 21, 2014	December 25, 2014
19	20	January 8, 2015	May 21, 2015
20	45	May 28, 2015	April 28, 2016
21	21	May 5, 2016	October 13, 2016
22	21	October 20, 2016	March 23, 2017

== Episodes ==
=== Season 1 (2007) ===
No. overall	No. in season	Title	Directed by	Written by	Original release date	English air date
Kazekage Rescue
1	1	"Homecoming"; Transliteration: "Kikyō" (Japanese: 帰郷)	Masaaki Kumagai	Satoru Nishizono	February 15, 2007	October 28, 2009 (Note: English air dates for episodes 1–98 of Naruto: Shippuden refer to its first broadcast on U.S. television on Disney XD.)
2	2	"The Akatsuki Makes Its Move"; Transliteration: "Akatsuki, Shidō" (Japanese: 暁, 始動)	Atsushi Nigorikawa	Satoru Nishizono	February 15, 2007	October 28, 2009
3	3	"The Results of Training"; Transliteration: "Shugyō no Seika" (Japanese: 修業の成果)	Yuki Sugihara	Satoru Nishizono	February 22, 2007	October 28, 2009
4	4	"The Jinchuriki of the Sand"; Transliteration: "Suna no Jinchūriki" (Japanese: 砂の人柱力)	Kiyomu Fukuda	Satoru Nishizono	March 1, 2007	October 28, 2009
5	5	"The Kazekage Stands Tall"; Transliteration: "Kazekage to shite...!" (Japanese: 風影として...!)	Yuki Kinoshita	Satoru Nishizono	March 15, 2007	November 4, 2009
6	6	"Mission Cleared"; Transliteration: "Norumakuriā" (Japanese: ノルマクリアー)	Mitsutaka Noshitani	Satoru Nishizono	March 29, 2007	November 11, 2009
7	7	"Run, Kankuro"; Transliteration: "Hashire Kankurō" (Japanese: 疾走(はし)れカンクロウ)	Hayato Goda	Satoru Nishizono	March 29, 2007	November 18, 2009
8	8	"Team Kakashi, Deployed"; Transliteration: "Shutsugeki, Kakashi-han" (Japanese: 出撃, カカシ班)	Hiroshi Kimura	Satoru Nishizono	April 12, 2007	December 2, 2009
9	9	"The Jinchuriki's Tears"; Transliteration: "Jinchūriki no Namida" (Japanese: 人柱力の涙)	Masaaki Kumagai	Satoru Nishizono	April 12, 2007	December 9, 2009
10	10	"Sealing Technique: Phantom Dragons Nine Consuming Seals"; Transliteration: "Fūin Jutsu: Genryū Kyū Fūjin" (Japanese: 封印術·幻龍九封尽)	Eitaro Ano	Satoru Nishizono	April 19, 2007	December 16, 2009
11	11	"The Medical Ninja's Student"; Transliteration: "Iryō Ninja no Deshi" (Japanese: 医療忍者の弟子)	Atsushi Nigorikawa	Satoru Nishizono	April 26, 2007	December 23, 2009
12	12	"The Retired Granny's Determination"; Transliteration: "Inkyo Babā no Ketsui" (Japanese: 隠居ババアの決意)	Kiyomu Fukuda	Satoru Nishizono	May 3, 2007	December 31, 2009
13	13	"A Meeting With Destiny"; Transliteration: "Innen Aimamieru" (Japanese: 因縁あいまみえる)	Neko Okuma	Satoru Nishizono	May 10, 2007	December 31, 2009
14	14	"Naruto's Growth"; Transliteration: "Naruto no Seichō" (Japanese: ナルトの成長)	Mitsutaka Noshitani	Satoru Nishizono	May 17, 2007	December 31, 2009
15	15	"The Secret Weapon is Called...."; Transliteration: "Kakushidama Nazukete" (Japanese: 隠し玉 名付けて...!)	Hayato Date	Satoru Nishizono	May 24, 2007	December 31, 2009
16	16	"The Secret of Jinchuriki"; Transliteration: "Jinchūriki no Himitsu" (Japanese: 人柱力の秘密)	Hiroshi Kimura	Satoru Nishizono	May 31, 2007	January 6, 2010
17	17	"The Death of Gaara!"; Transliteration: "Gaara Shisu!" (Japanese: 我愛羅死す!)	Masaaki Kumagai	Satoru Nishizono	June 7, 2007	January 13, 2010
18	18	"Charge Tactic! Button Hook Entry!!"; Transliteration: "Totsunyū! Botan Fukku Entorī" (Japanese: 突入!ボタンフックエントリー)	Eitaro Ano	Satoru Nishizono	June 21, 2007	January 20, 2010
19	19	"Traps Activate! Team Guy's Enemy"; Transliteration: "Torappu Sadō! Gai-han no Teki" (Japanese: 罠(トラップ)作動!ガイ班の敵)	Atsushi Nigorikawa	Satoru Nishizono	July 5, 2007	January 27, 2010
20	20	"Hiruko vs. Two Kunoichi!"; Transliteration: "Hiruko vs. Futari no Kunoichi" (Japanese: ヒルコVS二人の女忍者(くノいち))	Kiyomu Fukuda	Satoru Nishizono	July 19, 2007	February 3, 2010
21	21	"Sasori's Real Face"; Transliteration: "Sasori no Sugao" (Japanese: サソリの素顔)	Neko Okuma	Satoru Nishizono	July 26, 2007	February 10, 2010
22	22	"Chiyo's Secret Skills"; Transliteration: "Chiyo no Oku no Te" (Japanese: チヨの奥の手)	Mitsutaka Noshitani	Satoru Nishizono	August 2, 2007	February 17, 2010
23	23	"Father and Mother"; Transliteration: ""Chichi" to "Haha"" (Japanese: 「父」と「母」)	Masaki Takano	Satoru Nishizono	August 2, 2007	February 24, 2010
24	24	"The Third Kazekage"; Transliteration: "Sandaime Kazekage" (Japanese: 三代目風影)	Hiroshi Kimura	Satoru Nishizono	August 9, 2007	February 24, 2010
25	25	"Three Minutes Between Life and Death"; Transliteration: "Sei to Shi no Sanpunkan" (Japanese: 生と死の三分間)	Masaaki Kumagai	Satoru Nishizono	August 16, 2007	March 3, 2010
26	26	"Puppet Fight: 10 vs. 100!"; Transliteration: "Jukki vs Hyakki" (Japanese: 十機vs百機)	Atsushi Nigorikawa	Satoru Nishizono	August 23, 2007	March 10, 2010
27	27	"Impossible Dream"; Transliteration: "Kanawanu Yume" (Japanese: 叶わぬ夢)	Eitaro Ano	Satoru Nishizono	August 30, 2007	March 17, 2010
28	28	"Beasts: Alive Again!"; Transliteration: "Yomigaeru Kemono-tachi" (Japanese: 蘇る獣たち)	Kiyomu Fukuda	Satoru Nishizono	September 13, 2007	March 24, 2010
29	29	"Kakashi Enlightened!"; Transliteration: "Kakashi Kaigan!" (Japanese: カカシ開眼!)	Yuki Kinoshita	Satoru Nishizono	September 27, 2007	March 31, 2010
30	30	"Aesthetics of an Instant"; Transliteration: "Shunkan no Bigaku" (Japanese: 瞬間の美学)	Shigeharu Takahashi	Satoru Nishizono	September 27, 2007	April 7, 2010
31	31	"The Legacy"; Transliteration: "Tsugareyukumono" (Japanese: 継がれゆくもの)	Shinji Satou	Satoru Nishizono	October 18, 2007	April 14, 2010
32	32	"Return of the Kazekage"; Transliteration: "Kazekage no Kikan" (Japanese: 風影の帰還)	Hiroshi Kimura	Satoru Nishizono	October 25, 2007	April 21, 2010

=== Season 2 (2007–08) ===
No. overall	No. in season	Title	Directed by	Written by	Original release date	English air date
Long-Awaited Reunion
33	1	"The New Target"; Transliteration: "Aratanaru Tāgetto" (Japanese: 新たなる目標(ターゲット))	Masaaki Kumagai	Satoru Nishizono	November 8, 2007	April 28, 2010
34	2	"Formation! New Team Kakashi!"; Transliteration: "Kessei! Shin Kakashi han" (Japanese: 結成!新カカシ班)	Eitaro Ano	Satoru Nishizono	November 15, 2007	May 5, 2010
35	3	"An Unnecessary Addition"; Transliteration: "Gadatensoku" (Japanese: 画蛇添足(がだてんそく))	Masahiko Murata	Satoru Nishizono	November 22, 2007	May 12, 2010
36	4	"The Fake Smile"; Transliteration: "Itsuwari no egao" (Japanese: 偽りの笑顔)	Kiyomu Fukuda	Satoru Nishizono	November 29, 2007	May 19, 2010
37	5	"Untitled"; Transliteration: "Mudai" (Japanese: 無題)	Atsushi Nigorikawa	Satoru Nishizono	November 29, 2007	May 26, 2010
38	6	"Simulation"; Transliteration: "Shimyurēshon" (Japanese: 模擬戦闘訓練(シミュレーション))	Shigeharu Takahashi	Satoru Nishizono	December 6, 2007	June 2, 2010
39	7	"The Tenchi Bridge"; Transliteration: "Tenchikyō" (Japanese: 天地橋)	Masaki Takano	Satoru Nishizono	December 13, 2007	June 16, 2010
40	8	"The Nine-Tails Unleashed"; Transliteration: "Kyūbi kaihō!!" (Japanese: 九尾解放!!)	Hiroshi Kimura	Satoru Nishizono	December 20, 2007	June 23, 2010
41	9	"The Top-Secret Mission Begins"; Transliteration: "Gokuhi ninmu sutāto" (Japanese: 極秘任務スタート)	Masaaki Kumagai	Satoru Nishizono	December 20, 2007	June 30, 2010
42	10	"Orochimaru vs. Jinchuriki"; Transliteration: "Orochimaru tai Jinchūriki" (Japanese: 大蛇丸VS人柱力)	Masahiko Murata	Satoru Nishizono	January 10, 2008	July 7, 2010
43	11	"Sakura's Tears"; Transliteration: "Sakura no namida" (Japanese: サクラの涙)	Kunitoshi Okajima	Satoru Nishizono	January 17, 2008	July 14, 2010
44	12	"The Secret of the Battle!"; Transliteration: "Tatakai no tenmatsu" (Japanese: 戦いの顛末)	Kiyomu Fukuda	Satoru Nishizono	January 24, 2008	July 21, 2010
45	13	"The Consequences of Betrayal"; Transliteration: "Uragiri no hate" (Japanese: 裏切りの果て)	Atsushi Nigorikawa	Satoru Nishizono	January 31, 2008	July 28, 2010
46	14	"The Unfinished Page"; Transliteration: "Mikan no Pēji" (Japanese: 未完の頁(ページ))	Shigeharu Takahashi	Satoru Nishizono	February 7, 2008	August 4, 2010
47	15	"Infiltration: The Den of the Snake!"; Transliteration: "Sennyū! Dokuhebi no ajito" (Japanese: 潜入!毒蛇の巣窟(アジト))	Neko Okuma	Satoru Nishizono	February 14, 2008	August 11, 2010
48	16	"Bonds"; Transliteration: "Tsunagari" (Japanese: つながり)	Hiroshi Kimura	Satoru Nishizono	February 28, 2008	August 18, 2010
49	17	"Something Important..."; Transliteration: "Taisetsu na mono" (Japanese: 大切なモノ)	Shinji Satou	Satoru Nishizono	March 6, 2008	August 25, 2010
50	18	"The Picture Book's Story"; Transliteration: "Ehon ga kataru Sutōri" (Japanese: 絵本が語る物語(ストーリー))	Eitaro Ano	Satoru Nishizono	March 13, 2008	September 1, 2010
51	19	"Reunion"; Transliteration: "Saikai" (Japanese: 再会)	Masaaki Kumagai	Satoru Nishizono	March 20, 2008	September 8, 2010
52	20	"The Power of Uchiha"; Transliteration: "Uchiha no chikara" (Japanese: うちはの力)	Kiyomu Fukuda	Satoru Nishizono	March 20, 2008	September 15, 2010
53	21	"Title"; Transliteration: "Taitoru" (Japanese: 題名(タイトル))	Atsushi Nigorikawa	Satoru Nishizono	April 3, 2008	October 27, 2010

=== Season 3 (2008) ===
No. overall	No. in season	Title	Directed by	Written by	Original release date	English air date
Twelve Guardian Ninja
54	1	"Nightmare"; Transliteration: "Akumu" (Japanese: 悪夢)	Shigeharu Takahashi	Yasuyuki Suzuki	April 3, 2008	November 3, 2010
55	2	"Wind"; Transliteration: "Kaze" (Japanese: 旋風(かぜ))	Masahiko Murata	Yasuyuki Suzuki	April 17, 2008	November 10, 2010
56	3	"Squirm"; Transliteration: "Ugomeku" (Japanese: うごめく)	Hiroshi Kimura	Yasuyuki Suzuki	April 24, 2008	November 17, 2010
57	4	"Deprived of Eternal Sleep"; Transliteration: "Ubawareta nemuri" (Japanese: 奪われた永眠り)	Masaki Takano	Yasuyuki Suzuki	May 8, 2008	December 1, 2010
58	5	"Loneliness"; Transliteration: "Kodoku" (Japanese: 孤独)	Eitaro Ano	Yasuyuki Suzuki	May 8, 2008	December 8, 2010
59	6	"A New Enemy"; Transliteration: "Aratana teki" (Japanese: 新たな敵)	Masaaki Kumagai	Junki Takegami	May 15, 2008	December 15, 2010
60	7	"Impermanence"; Transliteration: "Uitenpen" (Japanese: 有為転変)	Kiyomu Fukuda	Junki Takegami	May 22, 2008	December 22, 2010
61	8	"Contact"; Transliteration: "Sesshoku" (Japanese: 接触)	Atsushi Nigorikawa	Yasuyuki Suzuki	May 29, 2008	December 29, 2010
62	9	"Teammate"; Transliteration: "Chīmumeito" (Japanese: チームメイト)	Shigeharu Takahashi	Yasuyuki Suzuki	June 5, 2008	January 5, 2011
63	10	"The Two Kings"; Transliteration: "Futatsu no gyoku" (Japanese: 二つの玉(ぎょく))	Yuki Kinoshita	Masahiro Hikokubo	June 19, 2008	January 12, 2011
64	11	"Jet Black Signal Fire"; Transliteration: "Shikkoku no noroshi" (Japanese: 漆黒の狼煙)	Hiroshi Kimura	Yasuyuki Suzuki	July 3, 2008	January 19, 2011
65	12	"Lockdown of Darkness"; Transliteration: "Ankoku no sejō" (Japanese: 暗黒の施錠)	Shinji Satou	Masahiro Hikokubo	July 3, 2008	January 26, 2011
66	13	"Revived Souls"; Transliteration: "Yomigaeru tamashii" (Japanese: 黄泉がえる魂)	Eitaro Ano	Yasuyuki Suzuki	July 10, 2008	February 2, 2011
67	14	"Everyone's Struggle to the Death"; Transliteration: "Sorezore no shitō" (Japanese: それぞれの死闘)	Masaaki Kumagai	Yasuyuki Suzuki Masahiro Hikokubo	July 24, 2008	February 9, 2011
68	15	"Moment of Awakening"; Transliteration: "Mezame no toki" (Japanese: 覚醒(めざ)めの刻(とき))	Kiyomu Fukuda	Yasuyuki Suzuki	July 31, 2008	February 16, 2011
69	16	"Despair"; Transliteration: "Zetsubō" (Japanese: 絶望)	Masaki Takano	Masahiro Hikokubo	July 31, 2008	February 23, 2011
70	17	"Resonance"; Transliteration: "Kyōmei" (Japanese: 共鳴)	Shigeharu Takahashi	Yasuyuki Suzuki	August 7, 2008	March 2, 2011
71	18	"My Friend"; Transliteration: "Tomo yo" (Japanese: 友よ)	Atsushi Nigorikawa	Yasuyuki Suzuki	August 14, 2008	March 9, 2011

=== Season 4 (2008) ===
No. overall	No. in season	Title	Directed by	Written by	Original release date	English air date
Immortal Devastators – Hidan and Kakuzu
72	1	"The Quietly Approaching Threat"; Transliteration: "Shinobiyoru kyōi" (Japanese: 忍び寄る脅威)	Hiroshi Kimura	Masahiro Hikokubo	August 21, 2008	March 16, 2011
73	2	"Akatsuki's Invasion"; Transliteration: "Akatsuki shinkō" (Japanese: "暁"侵攻)	Masaki Takuno	Masahiro Hikokubo	August 28, 2008	March 23, 2011
74	3	"Under the Starry Sky"; Transliteration: "Hoshizora no moto de" (Japanese: 星空の下(もと)で)	Eitaro Ano	Masahiro Hikokubo	September 4, 2008	March 30, 2011
75	4	"The Old Monk's Prayer"; Transliteration: "Rōsō no inori" (Japanese: 老僧の祈り)	Masaaki Kumagai	Yasuyuki Suzuki	September 11, 2008	April 6, 2011
76	5	"The Next Step"; Transliteration: "Tsuginaru Suteppu" (Japanese: 次なる階段(ステップ))	Kiyomu Fukuda	Yasuyuki Suzuki	September 25, 2008	April 16, 2011
77	6	"Climbing Silver"; Transliteration: "Bōgin" (Japanese: 棒銀)	Yuki Kinoshita	Masahiro Hikokubo	September 25, 2008	April 23, 2011
78	7	"The Judgment"; Transliteration: "Kudasareta sabaki" (Japanese: 下された裁き)	Shigeharu Takahashi	Masahiro Hikokubo	October 2, 2008	April 30, 2011
79	8	"Unfulfilled Scream"; Transliteration: "Todokanu zekkyō" (Japanese: 届かぬ絶叫)	Atsushi Nigorikawa	Masahiro Hikokubo	October 2, 2008	May 7, 2011
80	9	"Last Words"; Transliteration: "Saigo no kotoba" (Japanese: 最期の言葉)	Hiroshi Kimura	Masahiro Hikokubo	October 16, 2008	May 14, 2011
81	10	"Sad News"; Transliteration: "Kanashiki shirase" (Japanese: 悲しき報せ)	Shinji Satou	Masahiro Hikokubo	October 23, 2008	May 21, 2011
82	11	"Team Ten"; Transliteration: "Daijuppan" (Japanese: 第十班)	Toshiyuki Tsuru	Toshiyuki Tsuru	October 30, 2008	June 4, 2011
83	12	"Target: Locked On"; Transliteration: "Tāgetto Rokkuon" (Japanese: 標的捕捉(ターゲット・ロックオン))	Takahiro Ono	Yuka Miyata	November 6, 2008	June 18, 2011
84	13	"Kakuzu's Abilities"; Transliteration: "Kakuzu no nōryoku" (Japanese: 角都の能力)	Kiyomu Fukuda	Yuka Miyata	November 13, 2008	June 25, 2011
85	14	"The Terrifying Secret"; Transliteration: "Osorubeki himitsu" (Japanese: 恐るべき秘密)	Toshiyuki Tsuru	Toshiyuki Tsuru	November 20, 2008	July 2, 2011
86	15	"Shikamaru's Genius"; Transliteration: "Shikamaru no Sai" (Japanese: シカマルの才)	Masaaki Kumagai	Yuka Miyata	December 4, 2008	July 9, 2011
87	16	"When You Curse Someone, You Dig Your Own Grave"; Transliteration: "Hito o norowaba ana futatsu" (Japanese: 人を呪わば穴二つ)	Shigeharu Takahashi	Yasuyuki Suzuki	December 4, 2008	July 16, 2011
88	17	"Wind Style: Rasen Shuriken!"; Transliteration: "Fūton: Rasenshuriken!" (Japanese: 風遁·螺旋手裏剣!)	Atsushi Nigorikawa	Yasuyuki Suzuki	December 11, 2008	July 23, 2011

=== Season 5 (2008–09) ===
No. overall	No. in season	Title	Directed by	Written by	Original release date	English air date
The Three-Tailed Demon Turtle
89	1	"The Price of Power"; Transliteration: "Chikara no daishō" (Japanese: 力の代償)	Hiroshi Kimura	Yuka Miyata	December 18, 2008	July 30, 2011
90	2	"A Shinobi's Determination"; Transliteration: "Shinobi no ketsui" (Japanese: 忍の決意)	Yuki Kinoshita	Junki Takegami	December 25, 2008	August 6, 2011
91	3	"Orochimaru's Hideout Discovered"; Transliteration: "Hakken — Orochimaru no ajito" (Japanese: 発見 大蛇丸のアジト)	Yuusuke Onoda	Masahiro Hikokubo	January 8, 2009	August 20, 2011
92	4	"Encounter"; Transliteration: "Deai" (Japanese: 遭遇(であい))	Kunitoshi Okajima	Yasuyuki Suzuki	January 15, 2009	August 27, 2011
93	5	"Connecting Hearts"; Transliteration: "Kayoiau kokoro" (Japanese: 通い合う心)	Masaaki Kumagai	Shin Yoshida Yasuyuki Suzuki	January 22, 2009	September 3, 2011
94	6	"A Night of Rain"; Transliteration: "Ame hitoyo" (Japanese: 雨一夜(あめひとよ))	Kiyomu Fukuda	Shin Yoshida	January 29, 2009	September 10, 2011
95	7	"The Two Charms"; Transliteration: "Futatsu no omamori" (Japanese: ふたつのお守り)	Atsushi Nigorikawa	Shin Yoshida Yuka Miyata	February 5, 2009	September 17, 2011
96	8	"The Unseeing Enemy"; Transliteration: "Miezaru teki" (Japanese: 見えざる敵)	Shigeharu Takahashi	Yuka Miyata	February 12, 2009	October 1, 2011
97	9	"The Labyrinth of Distorted Reflection"; Transliteration: "Ranhansha no meikyū" (Japanese: 乱反射の迷宮)	Yuki Kinoshita	Junki Takegami	February 19, 2009	October 8, 2011
98	10	"The Target Appears"; Transliteration: "Arawareta hyōteki" (Japanese: 現れた標的)	Hiroshi Kimura	Shin Yoshida	February 26, 2009	November 5, 2011
99	11	"The Rampaging Tailed Beast"; Transliteration: "Arekurū Bijū" (Japanese: 荒れ狂う尾獣)	Yuusuke Onoda	Shin Yoshida	March 5, 2009	December 29, 2012 (Note: English air dates for episodes 99–338 of Naruto: Shippuden refer to its first premiere broadcast on the now–defunct Neon Alley web channel.)
100	12	"Inside the Mist"; Transliteration: "Kiri no naka de" (Japanese: 霧の中で)	Kunitoshi Okajima	Junki Takegami Shin Yoshida	March 12, 2009	December 29, 2012
101	13	"Everyone's Feelings"; Transliteration: "Sorezore no omoi" (Japanese: それぞれの想い)	Masaaki Kumagai	Yuka Miyata	March 26, 2009	December 31, 2012
102	14	"Regroup!"; Transliteration: "Saihensei!" (Japanese: 再編成!)	Kiyomu Fukuda	Junki Takegami Yuka Miyata	March 26, 2009	December 31, 2012
103	15	"The Four-Corner Sealing Barrier"; Transliteration: "Kekkai Shihō Fūjin" (Japanese: 結界四方封陣)	Atsushi Nigorikawa	Masahiro Hikokubo	April 9, 2009	December 31, 2012
104	16	"Breaking the Crystal Style"; Transliteration: "Shōton kuzushi" (Japanese: 晶遁崩し)	Shigeharu Takahashi	Shin Yoshida Junki Takegami	April 9, 2009	December 31, 2012
105	17	"The Battle Over the Barrier"; Transliteration: "Kekkai kōbōsen" (Japanese: 結界攻防戦)	Yuki Kinoshita	Yuka Miyata	April 16, 2009	January 5, 2013
106	18	"Red Camellia"; Transliteration: "Akai tsubaki" (Japanese: 赤い椿)	Hiroshi Kimura	Masahiro Hikokubo	April 23, 2009	January 5, 2013
107	19	"Strange Bedfellows"; Transliteration: "Goetsudōshū" (Japanese: 呉越同舟)	Toshiaki Kanbara	Yasuyuki Suzuki	April 30, 2009	January 5, 2013
108	20	"Guidepost of the Camellia"; Transliteration: "Tsubaki no michishirube" (Japanese: 椿の道標)	Kunitoshi Okajima	Shin Yoshida	May 7, 2009	January 5, 2013
109	21	"Counterattack of the Curse Mark"; Transliteration: "Juin no gyakushū" (Japanese: 呪印の逆襲)	Shigeharu Takahashi	Junki Takegami	May 14, 2009	January 7, 2013
110	22	"Memory of Guilt"; Transliteration: "Tsumi no kioku" (Japanese: 罪の記憶)	Kiyomu Fukuda	Junki Takegami	May 21, 2009	January 7, 2013
111	23	"Shattered Promise"; Transliteration: "Kudakareta yakusoku" (Japanese: 砕かれた約束)	Yuki Kinoshita	Junki Takegami	May 28, 2009	January 7, 2013
112	24	"A Place to Return To"; Transliteration: "Kaerubeki basho" (Japanese: 帰るべき場所)	Shigeharu Takahashi	Yuka Miyata Junki Takegami	June 4, 2009	January 7, 2013

=== Season 6 (2009–10) ===
No. overall	No. in season	Title	Directed by	Written by	Original release date	English air date
Master's Prophecy and Vengeance
113	1	"The Serpent's Pupil (Note: (of the eye))" Transliteration: "Daija no dōkō" (Japanese: 大蛇の瞳孔)	Masayuki Matsumoto	Masahiro Hikokubo	June 11, 2009	January 12, 2013
114	2	"Eye of the Hawk"; Transliteration: "Taka no hitomi" (Japanese: 鷹の瞳)	Hiroshi Kimura	Masahiro Hikokubo	June 18, 2009	January 12, 2013
115	3	"Zabuza's Blade"; Transliteration: "Zabuza no daitō" (Japanese: 再不斬の大刀)	Shuu Watanabe	Shin Yoshida	June 25, 2009	January 12, 2013
116	4	"Guardian of the Iron Wall"; Transliteration: "Teppeki no bannin" (Japanese: 鉄壁の番人)	Kunitoshi Okajima	Yasuyuki Suzuki	July 2, 2009	January 12, 2013
117	5	"Jugo of the North Hideout"; Transliteration: "Kita ajito no Jūgo" (Japanese: 北アジトの重吾)	Yuki Arie	Shin Yoshida	July 9, 2009	January 14, 2013
118	6	"Formation!"; Transliteration: "Kessei!" (Japanese: 結成!)	Kiyomu Fukuda	Shin Yoshida	July 23, 2009	January 14, 2013
Kakashi Chronicles: Boys' Life on the Battlefield
119	7	"Kakashi Chronicles ~Boys' Life on the Battlefield~ Part 1"; Transliteration: "Kakashi Gaiden ~Senjō no bōizuraifu~ Zenpen" (Japanese: カカシ外伝～戦場のボーイズライフ～前編)	Yasumi Mikamoto	Junki Takegami	July 30, 2009	January 14, 2013
120	8	"Kakashi Chronicles ~Boys' Life on the Battlefield~ Part 2"; Transliteration: "Kakashi Gaiden ~Senjō no bōizuraifu~ Kōhen" (Japanese: カカシ外伝～戦場のボーイズライフ～後編)	Masahiro Takada	Junki Takegami	July 30, 2009	January 14, 2013
Master's Prophecy and Vengeance
121	9	"Assemble"; Transliteration: "Ugokidasumono-tachi" (Japanese: 動き出すものたち)	Masayuki Matsumoto	Yuka Miyata	August 6, 2009	January 19, 2013
122	10	"The Hunt"; Transliteration: "Tansaku" (Japanese: 探索)	Hiroshi Kimura	Yuka Miyata	August 13, 2009	January 19, 2013
123	11	"Clash!"; Transliteration: "Gekitotsu!" (Japanese: 激突!)	Toshiyuki Tsuru	Toshiyuki Tsuru	August 20, 2009	January 19, 2013
124	12	"Art"; Transliteration: "Geijutsu" (Japanese: 芸術)	Kunitoshi Okajima	Junki Takegami	August 27, 2009	January 19, 2013
125	13	"Disappearance"; Transliteration: "Shōshitsu" (Japanese: 消失)	Yuki Kinoshita	Yasuyuki Suzuki	September 3, 2009	January 21, 2013
126	14	"Twilight"; Transliteration: "Tasogare" (Japanese: 黄昏)	Kiyomu Fukuda	Masahiro Hikokubo	September 10, 2009	January 21, 2013
Tales of a Gutsy Ninja ~Jiraiya Ninja Scroll
127	15	"Tales of a Gutsy Ninja ~Jiraiya Ninja Scroll~ Part 1"; Transliteration: "Dokonjō ninden ~Jiraiya ninpōchō~ Zenpen" (Japanese: ド根性忍伝～自来也忍法帖～前編)	Shuu Watanabe	Junki Takegami	September 24, 2009	January 21, 2013
128	16	"Tales of a Gutsy Ninja ~Jiraiya Ninja Scroll~ Part 2"; Transliteration: "Dokonjō ninden ~Jiraiya ninpōchō~ Kōhen" (Japanese: ド根性忍伝～自来也忍法帖～後編)	Shigeharu Takahashi	Junki Takegami	September 24, 2009	January 21, 2013
Master's Prophecy and Vengeance
129	17	"Infiltrate! The Village Hidden in the Rain"; Transliteration: "Sennyū! Amegakure no Sato" (Japanese: 潜入! 雨隠れの里)	Yuusuke Onoda	Shin Yoshida	October 8, 2009	January 26, 2013
130	18	"The Man Who Became God"; Transliteration: "Kami to natta Otoko" (Japanese: 神となった男)	Hiroshi Kimura	Shin Yoshida	October 8, 2009	January 26, 2013
131	19	"Honored Sage Mode!"; Transliteration: "Hatsudō! Sennin Mōdo" (Japanese: 発動! 仙人モード)	Akitoshi Yokoyama	Yasuyuki Suzuki	October 15, 2009	January 26, 2013
132	20	"In Attendance, the Six Paths of Pain"; Transliteration: "Pein Rikudō, kenzan" (Japanese: ペイン六道、見参)	Fujiaki Asari	Yuka Miyata	October 22, 2009	January 26, 2013
133	21	"The Tale of Jiraiya the Gallant"; Transliteration: "Jiraiya gōketsu monogatari" (Japanese: 自来也豪傑物語)	Masaaki Kumagai	Junki Takegami	October 29, 2009	January 28, 2013
134	22	"Banquet Invitation"; Transliteration: "Utage e no izanai" (Japanese: 宴への誘い)	Kiyomu Fukuda	Masahiro Hikokubo	November 5, 2009	January 28, 2013
135	23	"The Longest Moment"; Transliteration: "Nagaki toki no naka de..." (Japanese: 長き瞬間の中で...)	Atsushi Nigorikawa	Shin Yoshida	November 19, 2009	January 28, 2013
136	24	"The Light & Dark of the Mangekyo Sharingan"; Transliteration: "Mangekyō Sharingan no hikari to yami" (Japanese: 万華鏡写輪眼の光と闇)	Shigeharu Takahashi	Yasuyuki Suzuki	November 19, 2009	January 28, 2013
137	25	"Amaterasu!" (Japanese: 天照)	Yuusuke Onoda	Yuka Miyata	November 26, 2009	February 2, 2013
138	26	"The End"; Transliteration: "Shūen" (Japanese: 終焉)	Masahiko Murata	Masahiro Hikokubo	December 3, 2009	February 2, 2013
139	27	"The Mystery of Tobi"; Transliteration: "Tobi no nazo" (Japanese: トビの謎)	Hiroshi Kimura	Shin Yoshida	December 10, 2009	February 2, 2013
140	28	"Fate"; Transliteration: "Innen" (Japanese: 因縁)	Minoru Yamaoka	Yasuyuki Suzuki	December 17, 2009	February 2, 2013
141	29	"Truth"; Transliteration: "Shinjitsu" (Japanese: 真実)	Shuu Watanabe	Yuka Miyata	December 24, 2009	February 4, 2013
142	30	"Battle of Unraikyo"; Transliteration: "Unraikyō no tatakai" (Japanese: 雲雷峡の闘い)	Kiyomu Fukuda	Yasuyuki Suzuki	January 7, 2010	February 4, 2013
143	31	"The Eight-Tails vs. Sasuke"; Transliteration: "Hachibi' tai 'Sasuke" (Japanese: 「八尾」対「サスケ」)	Atsushi Nigorikawa	Shin Yoshida	January 14, 2010	February 4, 2013

=== Season 7 (2010) ===
No. overall	No. in season	Title	Directed by	Written by	Original release date	English air date
The Six-Tailed Demon Slug
144	1	"Wanderer"; Transliteration: "Fūraibō" (Japanese: 風来坊)	Masaaki Kumagai	Junki Takegami	January 21, 2010	February 4, 2013
145	2	"Successor of the Forbidden Jutsu"; Transliteration: "Kinjutsu no keishōsha" (Japanese: 禁術の継承者)	Shigeharu Takahashi	Shin Yoshida	January 28, 2010	February 9, 2013
146	3	"The Successor's Wish"; Transliteration: "Keishōsha no omoi" (Japanese: 継承者の想い)	Hiroshi Kimura	Yuka Miyata	February 4, 2010	February 9, 2013
147	4	"Rogue Ninja's Past"; Transliteration: "Nukenin no kako" (Japanese: 抜け忍の過去)	Yuki Kinoshita	Yasuyuki Suzuki	February 11, 2010	February 9, 2013
148	5	"Heir to Darkness"; Transliteration: "Yami no kōkeisha" (Japanese: 闇の後継者)	Eiko Nishi	Shin Yoshida	February 18, 2010	February 9, 2013
149	6	"Separation"; Transliteration: "Betsuri" (Japanese: 別離)	Shuu Watanabe	Masahiro Hikokubo	February 25, 2010	February 16, 2013
150	7	"The Forbidden Jutsu Released"; Transliteration: "Kinjutsu hatsudō" (Japanese: 禁術発動)	Kiyomu Fukuda	Yasuyuki Suzuki	March 4, 2010	February 16, 2013
151	8	"Master and Student"; Transliteration: "Shitei" (Japanese: 師弟)	Yuusuke Onoda	Yasuyuki Suzuki	March 11, 2010	February 16, 2013

=== Season 8 (2010) ===
No. overall	No. in season	Title	Directed by	Written by	Original release date	English air date
Two Saviors
152	1	"Somber News"; Transliteration: "Hihō" (Japanese: 悲報)	Naoki Horiuchi	Yuka Miyata	March 25, 2010	February 16, 2013
153	2	"Following the Master's Shadow"; Transliteration: "Shi no Kage o Otte" (Japanese: 師の影を追って)	Masaaki Kumagai	Yuka Miyata	March 25, 2010	February 23, 2013
154	3	"Decryption"; Transliteration: "Angō Kaidoku" (Japanese: 暗号解読)	Shigeharu Takahashi	Shin Yoshida	April 8, 2010	February 23, 2013
155	4	"The First Challenge"; Transliteration: "Daiichi no Kadai" (Japanese: 第一の課題)	Hiroshi Kimura	Shin Yoshida	April 8, 2010	February 23, 2013
156	5	"Surpassing the Master"; Transliteration: "Shi o Koeru Toki" (Japanese: 師を超えるとき)	Yuki Kinoshita	Yuka Miyata	April 15, 2010	February 23, 2013
157	6	"Assault on the Leaf Village!"; Transliteration: "Konoha Shūgeki!" (Japanese: 木ノ葉襲撃!)	Hideyuki Yoshida	Masahiro Hikokubo	April 22, 2010	March 2, 2013
158	7	"Power to Believe"; Transliteration: "Shinjiru Chikara" (Japanese: 信じる力)	Kiyomu Fukuda	Shin Yoshida	April 29, 2010	March 2, 2013
159	8	"Pain vs. Kakashi"; Transliteration: "Pein vs Kakashi" (Japanese: ペインvsカカシ)	Yoshihiro Sugai	Yuka Miyata	May 6, 2010	March 2, 2013
160	9	"Mystery of Pain"; Transliteration: "Pein no Nazo" (Japanese: ペインの謎)	Naoki Horiuchi	Yasuyuki Suzuki	May 13, 2010	March 2, 2013
161	10	"Surname Is Sarutobi. Given Name, Konohamaru!"; Transliteration: "Sei wa Sarutobi, Na wa Konohamaru!" (Japanese: 姓は猿飛、名は木ノ葉丸!)	Shigeharu Takahashi	Masahiro Hikokubo	May 20, 2010	March 9, 2013
162	11	"Pain to the World"; Transliteration: "Sekai ni Itami o" (Japanese: 世界に痛みを)	Masaaki Kumagai	Shin Yoshida	May 27, 2010	March 9, 2013
163	12	"Explode! Sage Mode"; Transliteration: "Bakuhatsu! Sennin Mōdo" (Japanese: 爆発! 仙人モード)	Yuki Kinoshita	Masahiro Hikokubo	June 3, 2010	March 9, 2013
164	13	"Danger! Sage Mode Limit Reached"; Transliteration: "Pinchi! Kieta Sennin Mōdo" (Japanese: 危機! 消えた仙人モード)	Yasuhiro Minami	Shin Yoshida	June 10, 2010	March 9, 2013
165	14	"Nine-Tails, Captured!"; Transliteration: "Kyūbi Hokaku Kanryō" (Japanese: 九尾捕獲完了)	Hiroshi Kimura	Shin Yoshida	June 17, 2010	March 16, 2013
166	15	"Confessions"; Transliteration: "Kokuhaku" (Japanese: 告白)	Toshiyuki Tsuru	Toshiyuki Tsuru	June 24, 2010	March 16, 2013
167	16	"Planetary Devastation"; Transliteration: "Chibaku Tensei" (Japanese: 地爆天星)	Atsushi Wakabayashi	Yuka Miyata	July 1, 2010	March 16, 2013
168	17	"The Fourth Hokage"; Transliteration: "Yondaime Hokage" (Japanese: 四代目火影)	Kiyomu Fukuda	Masahiro Hikokubo	July 15, 2010	March 16, 2013
169	18	"The Two Students"; Transliteration: "Futari no Deshi" (Japanese: ふたりの弟子)	Yoshihiro Sugai	Shin Yoshida	July 22, 2010	March 23, 2013
Big Adventure! The Quest for the Fourth Hokage's Legacy
170	19	"Big Adventure! The Quest for the Fourth Hokage's Legacy – Part 1"; Transliteration: "Daibōken! Yondaime no Isan o Sagase – Zenpen" (Japanese: 大冒険! 四代目の遺産を探せ・前編)	Naoki Horiuchi	Junki Takegami	July 29, 2010	March 23, 2013
171	20	"Big Adventure! The Quest for the Fourth Hokage's Legacy – Part 2"; Transliteration: "Daibōken! Yondaime no Isan o Sagase – Kōhen" (Japanese: 大冒険! 四代目の遺産を探せ・後編)	Yuki Kinoshita	Junki Takegami	July 29, 2010	March 23, 2013
Two Saviors
172	21	"Meeting"; Transliteration: "Deai" (Japanese: 出逢い)	Takahiro Okao	Shin Yoshida	August 5, 2010	March 23, 2013
173	22	"Origin of Pain"; Transliteration: "Pein Tanjō" (Japanese: ペイン誕生)	Masaaki Kumagai	Masahiro Hikokubo	August 12, 2010	March 30, 2013
174	23	"The Tale of Naruto Uzumaki"; Transliteration: "Uzumaki Naruto Monogatari" (Japanese: うずまきナルト物語)	Kanryou Kishikawa	Yasuyuki Suzuki	August 19, 2010	March 30, 2013
175	24	"Hero of the Leaf"; Transliteration: "Konoha no Eiyū" (Japanese: 木ノ葉の英雄)	Hiroshi Kimura	Yuka Miyata	August 26, 2010	March 30, 2013

=== Season 9 (2010–11) ===
No. overall	No. in season	Title	Directed by	Written by	Original release date	English air date
Past Arc: The Locus of Konoha
176	1	"Rookie Instructor Iruka"; Transliteration: "Shinmai Kyōshi Iruka" (Japanese: 新米教師イルカ)	Kiyomu Fukuda	Shin Yoshida	September 2, 2010	March 30, 2013
177	2	"Iruka's Ordeal"; Transliteration: "Iruka no Shiren" (Japanese: イルカの試練)	Naoki Horiuchi	Shin Yoshida	September 9, 2010	April 6, 2013
178	3	"Iruka's Decision"; Transliteration: "Iruka no Ketsui" (Japanese: イルカの決意)	Atsushi Nigorikawa	Shin Yoshida	September 16, 2010	April 6, 2013
179	4	"Kakashi Hatake, The Jonin in Charge"; Transliteration: "Tantō Jōnin Hatake Kakashi" (Japanese: 担当上忍はたけカカシ)	Hiroshi Kimura	Junki Takegami	September 30, 2010	April 6, 2013
180	5	"Inari's Courage Put to the Test"; Transliteration: "Inari, Tamesareru Yūki" (Japanese: イナリ、試される勇気)	Gorou Sessha	Yuka Miyata	October 7, 2010	April 6, 2013
181	6	"Naruto's School of Revenge"; Transliteration: "Naruto, Adauchi Shinanjuku" (Japanese: ナルト、仇討ち指南塾)	Shuu Watanabe	Yasuyuki Suzuki	October 14, 2010	April 13, 2013
182	7	"Gaara's Bond"; Transliteration: "Gaara 'Kizuna'" (Japanese: 我愛羅『絆』)	Kanryou Kishikawa	Masahiro Hikokubo	October 21, 2010	April 13, 2013
183	8	"Naruto: Outbreak"; Transliteration: "Naruto Autobureiku" (Japanese: ナルト・アウトブレイク)	Maki Odaira	Daisuke Watanabe	October 28, 2010	April 13, 2013
184	9	"Deploy! Team Tenten"; Transliteration: "Shutsugeki! Tenten-han" (Japanese: 出撃! テンテン班)	Shigeru Mita	Katsuhiko Chiba	November 4, 2010	April 13, 2013
185	10	"Animal District"; Transliteration: "Animaru Bangaichi" (Japanese: アニマル番外地)	Kiyomu Fukuda	Katsuhiko Chiba	November 11, 2010	April 20, 2013
186	11	"Ah, the Medicine of Youth"; Transliteration: "Aa, Seishun no Kanpōgan" (Japanese: ああ、青春の漢方丸)	Masaaki Kumagai	Daisuke Watanabe	November 18, 2010	April 27, 2013
187	12	"Gutsy Master and Student: The Training"; Transliteration: "Dokonjō Shitei Shugyōhen" (Japanese: ド根性師弟修業編)	Atsushi Nigorikawa	Junki Takegami	November 25, 2010	May 4, 2013
188	13	"Record of the Ninja Gutsy Master and Student"; Transliteration: "Dokonjō Shitei Ninpūroku" (Japanese: ド根性師弟忍風録)	Naoki Horiuchi	Junki Takegami	November 25, 2010	May 11, 2013
189	14	"Sasuke's Paw Encyclopedia"; Transliteration: "Sasuke no Nikukyū Taizen" (Japanese: サスケの肉球大全)	Hiroshi Kimura	Masahiro Hikokubo	December 2, 2010	May 18, 2013
190	15	"Naruto and the Old Soldier"; Transliteration: "Naruto to Rōhei" (Japanese: ナルトと老兵)	Maki Odaira	Katsuhiko Chiba	December 9, 2010	May 25, 2013
191	16	"Kakashi Love Song"; Transliteration: "Kakashi Koiuta" (Japanese: カカシ恋歌)	Shuu Watanabe	Yasuyuki Suzuki	December 16, 2010	June 1, 2013
192	17	"Neji Chronicles"; Transliteration: "Neji Gaiden" (Japanese: ネジ外伝)	Kanryou Kishikawa	Yuka Miyata	December 23, 2010	June 8, 2013
193	18	"The Man Who Died Twice"; Transliteration: "Nido Shinda Otoko" (Japanese: 二度死んだ男)	Chiyuki Tanaka	Shin Yoshida	January 6, 2011	June 15, 2013
194	19	"The Worst Three-Legged Race"; Transliteration: "Saiaku no Nininsankyaku" (Japanese: 最悪の二人三脚)	Gorou Sessha	Yasuyuki Suzuki	January 13, 2011	June 22, 2013
195	20	"Team 10's Teamwork"; Transliteration: "Renkei, Daijuppan" (Japanese: 連携、第十班)	Hiroyuki Tsuchiya	Masahiro Hikokubo	January 20, 2011	June 29, 2013
196	21	"Drive Towards Darkness"; Transliteration: "Yami e no Shissō" (Japanese: 闇への疾走)	Hiroshi Kimura	Daisuke Watanabe	January 27, 2011	July 6, 2013

=== Season 10 (2011) ===
No. overall	No. in season	Title	Directed by	Written by	Original release date	English air date
The Gathering of the Five Kage
197	1	"The Sixth Hokage Danzo"; Transliteration: "Rokudaime Hokage Danzō" (Japanese: 六代目火影ダンゾウ)	Masaaki Kumagai	Katsuhiko Chiba	February 10, 2011	July 13, 2013
198	2	"Five Kage Summit's Eve"; Transliteration: "Gokage Kaidan Zen'ya" (Japanese: 五影会談前夜)	Atsushi Nigorikawa	Yuka Miyata	February 10, 2011	July 20, 2013
199	3	"Enter the Five Kage!"; Transliteration: "Gokage Tōjō!" (Japanese: 五影登場!)	Naoki Horiuchi	Katsuhiko Chiba	February 17, 2011	July 27, 2013
200	4	"Naruto's Plea"; Transliteration: "Naruto no Tangan" (Japanese: ナルトの嘆願)	Shuu Watanabe	Shin Yoshida	February 24, 2011	August 3, 2013
201	5	"Painful Decision"; Transliteration: "Kujū no Ketsudan" (Japanese: 苦渋の決断)	Maki Odaira	Yasuyuki Suzuki	March 3, 2011	August 10, 2013
202	6	"Racing Lightning"; Transliteration: "Hashiru Ikazuchi" (Japanese: 疾走る雷)	Shigeru Mita	Katsuhiko Chiba	March 10, 2011	August 17, 2013
203	7	"Sasuke's Ninja Way"; Transliteration: "Sasuke no Nindō" (Japanese: サスケの忍道)	Kanryou Kishikawa	Yasuyuki Suzuki	March 17, 2011	August 24, 2013
204	8	"Power of the Five Kage"; Transliteration: "Gokage no Chikara" (Japanese: 五影の実力)	Ken'ichi Nishida	Yuka Miyata	March 24, 2011	August 31, 2013
205	9	"Declaration of War"; Transliteration: "Sensenfukoku" (Japanese: 宣戦布告)	Kiyomu Fukuda	Masahiro Hikokubo	March 31, 2011	September 7, 2013
206	10	"Sakura's Feelings"; Transliteration: "Sakura no Omoi" (Japanese: サクラの想い)	Hiroshi Kimura	Shin Yoshida	April 7, 2011	September 14, 2013
207	11	"The Tailed Beast vs. The Tailless Tailed Beast"; Transliteration: "Bijū VS O no nai Bijū" (Japanese: 尾獣VS尾のない尾獣)	Naoki Horiuchi	Katsuhiko Chiba	April 14, 2011	September 21, 2013
208	12	"As One's Friend"; Transliteration: "Tomo to shite" (Japanese: 親友として)	Shuu Watanabe	Yasuyuki Suzuki	April 21, 2011	September 28, 2013
209	13	"Danzo's Right Arm"; Transliteration: "Danzō no Migiude" (Japanese: ダンゾウの右腕)	Yoshihiro Sugai	Daisuke Watanabe	April 28, 2011	October 5, 2013
210	14	"The Forbidden Visual Jutsu"; Transliteration: "Kinjirareta Dōjutsu" (Japanese: 禁じられた瞳術)	Masato Kitagawa	Shin Yoshida	May 5, 2011	October 12, 2013
211	15	"Danzo Shimura"; Transliteration: "Shimura Danzō" (Japanese: 志村ダンゾウ)	Ken'ichi Nishida Hayato Date	Katsuhiko Chiba	May 12, 2011	October 19, 2013
212	16	"Sakura's Resolve"; Transliteration: "Sakura no Kakugo" (Japanese: サクラの覚悟)	Hideaki Uehara	Yasuyuki Suzuki	May 19, 2011	October 19, 2013
213	17	"Lost Bonds"; Transliteration: "Ushinawareta Kizuna" (Japanese: 失われた絆)	Mitsutoshi Satou	Daisuke Watanabe	May 26, 2011	October 26, 2013
214	18	"The Burden"; Transliteration: "Seōbeki Omoni" (Japanese: 背負うべき重荷)	Kiyomu Fukuda	Masahiro Hikokubo	June 2, 2011	November 2, 2013
215	19	"Two Fates"; Transliteration: "Shukumei no Futari" (Japanese: 宿命のふたり)	Hiroshi Kimura	Shin Yoshida	June 9, 2011	November 9, 2013
216	20	"High-Level Shinobi"; Transliteration: "Ichiryū no Shinobi" (Japanese: 一流の忍)	Ken'ichi Nishida	Shin Yoshida	June 16, 2011	November 16, 2013
217	21	"The Infiltrator"; Transliteration: "Sennyūsha" (Japanese: 潜入者)	Daisuke Tsukushi	Katsuhiko Chiba	June 23, 2011	November 23, 2013
218	22	"The Five Great Nations Mobilize"; Transliteration: "Ugokidasu Taikoku" (Japanese: 動き出す大国)	Masato Kitagawa	Yuka Miyata	June 30, 2011	November 30, 2013
219	23	"Kakashi Hatake, the Hokage"; Transliteration: "Hokage Hatake Kakashi" (Japanese: 火影はたけカカシ)	Yoshihiro Sugai	Katsuhiko Chiba	July 7, 2011	December 7, 2013
220	24	"Prophecy of the Great Lord Elder"; Transliteration: "Ōgama Sennin no Yogen" (Japanese: 大ガマ仙人の予言)	Kanryou Kishikawa	Yasuyuki Suzuki	July 21, 2011	December 14, 2013
221	25	"Storage"; Transliteration: "Kurairi" (Japanese: 蔵入り)	Naoki Horiuchi	Masahiro Hikokubo	July 28, 2011	December 21, 2013

=== Season 11 (2011) ===
No. overall	No. in season	Title	Directed by	Written by	Animation directed by	Original release date	English air date
Paradise Life on a Boat
222	1	"The Five Kage's Decision"; Transliteration: "Gokage no Ketsudan" (Japanese: 五影の決断)	Kiyomu Fukuda	Shin Yoshida	Ik-Hyun Eum	July 28, 2011	December 28, 2013
223	2	"The Young Man and the Sea"; Transliteration: "Seinen to Umi" (Japanese: 青年と海)	Directed by : Mitsutoshi Satou; Storyboarded by : Tomoyuki Kurokawa	Junki Takegami	Shigeki Kawai	August 4, 2011	January 4, 2014
224	3	"The Ninja of Benisu"; Transliteration: "Benisu no Shōnin" (Japanese: 紅州の商忍)	Directed by : Yoshihiro Sugai & Hiroshi Kataoka; Storyboarded by : Jun Kamiya	Katsuhiko Chiba	Hiromi Yoshinuma	August 11, 2011	January 11, 2014
225	4	"The Cursed Ghost Ship"; Transliteration: "Norowareta Yūreisen" (Japanese: 呪われた幽霊船)	Yutaka Kagawa	Masahiro Hikokubo	Masayuki Kouda	August 18, 2011	January 18, 2014
226	5	"Battleship Island"; Transliteration: "Senkan no Shima" (Japanese: 戦艦の島)	Directed by : Maki Odaira; Storyboarded by : Tsutomu Naniwa	Yasuyuki Suzuki	Beom-Seok Hong	August 25, 2011	January 25, 2014
227	6	"The Forgotten Island"; Transliteration: "Bōkyaku no Shima" (Japanese: 忘却の島)	Directed by : Masahito Otani; Storyboarded by : Toshiyasu Furukawa	Katsuhiko Chiba	Naoki Takahashi, Noritomo Hattori & Takashi Saijou	September 1, 2011	February 1, 2014
228	7	"Fight! Rock Lee!"; Transliteration: "Tatakae Rokku Rī!" (Japanese: 闘えロック・リー!)	Directed by : Kanryou Kishikawa; Storyboarded by : Jun Kamiya	Masahiro Hikokubo	Zenjirou Ukulele, Hong Rong & Yuuko Ishizaki	September 8, 2011	February 8, 2014
229	8	"Eat or Die! Mushrooms from Hell!"; Transliteration: "Kuu ka Kuwareru ka! Odoru Kinoko Jigoku" (Japanese: 食うか食われるか!踊るキノコ地獄)	Kiyomu Fukuda	Shin Yoshida	Ik-Hyun Eum	September 22, 2011	February 15, 2014
230	9	"Revenge of the Shadow Clones"; Transliteration: "Kage no Gyakushū" (Japanese: 影の逆襲)	Directed by : Hiroshi Kataoka & Yoshihiro Sugai; Storyboarded by : Yoshihiro Sugai	Yasuyuki Suzuki	Eiichi Tokura & Takashi Nishikawa	September 29, 2011	February 22, 2014
231	10	"The Closed Route"; Transliteration: "Tozasareta Kōro" (Japanese: 閉ざされた航路)	Ken'ichi Nishida	Junki Takegami & Daisuke Watanabe	Shigeki Kawai & Noriko Ohtake	October 6, 2011	March 1, 2014
232	11	"The Girls' Get-Together"; Transliteration: "Konoha no Joshikai" (Japanese: 木ノ葉の女子会)	Directed by : Shuu Watanabe; Storyboarded by : Shinji Satou	Katsuhiko Chiba	Kumiko Horikoshi	October 13, 2011	March 8, 2014
233	12	"Naruto's Imposter"; Transliteration: "Sanjō, Nise? Naruto" (Japanese: 参上、偽? ナルト)	Directed by : Naoki Horiuchi; Storyboarded by : Tsutomu Naniwa	Shin Yoshida	Naoki Takahashi, Takashi Saijou & Konomi Sakurai	October 20, 2011	March 15, 2014
234	13	"Naruto's Favorite Student"; Transliteration: "Naruto no Manadeshi" (Japanese: ナルトの愛弟子)	Gorou Sessha	Junki Takegami	Masayuki Kouda	October 27, 2011	March 22, 2014
235	14	"The Kunoichi of Nadeshiko Village"; Transliteration: "Nadeshiko no Kunoichi" (Japanese: 撫子のくノ一)	Directed by : Jun'ichi Fujise; Storyboarded by : Jun Kamiya	Yuka Miyata	Beom-Seok Hong	November 3, 2011	March 29, 2014
236	15	"Friends You Can Count On"; Transliteration: "Nakama no Senaka" (Japanese: 仲間の背中)	Directed by : Tomoya Tanaka; Storyboarded by : Masahiro Hosoda	Shin Yoshida	Shigeki Kawai & Kengo Matsumoto	November 10, 2011	April 5, 2014
237	16	"Ah, My Hero Lady Tsunade!"; Transliteration: "Aa, Akogare no Tsunade-sama" (Japanese: ああ、憧れの綱手様)	Directed by : Hisashi Ishii; Storyboarded by : Shinji Satou	Katsuhiko Chiba	Zenjirou Ukulele, Manabu Akita, Hong Rong & Yuuko Ishizaki	November 24, 2011	April 12, 2014
238	17	"Sai's Day Off"; Transliteration: "Sai no Kyūsoku" (Japanese: サイの休息)	Masaaki Kumagai	Yasuyuki Suzuki	Hiroyuki Yamashita	December 1, 2011	April 19, 2014
239	18	"The Legendary Ino-Shika-Cho Trio"; Transliteration: "Densetsu no Ino-Shika-Chō" (Japanese: 伝説の猪鹿蝶)	Kiyomu Fukuda	Masahiro Hikokubo	Ik-Hyun Eum	December 8, 2011	April 26, 2014
240	19	"Kiba's Determination"; Transliteration: "Kiba no Ketsui" (Japanese: キバの決意)	Directed by : Ken'ichi Nishida; Storyboarded by : Shinji Satou	Daisuke Watanabe	Masayuki Kouda & Kayano Tomizawa	December 15, 2011	May 3, 2014
241	20	"Kakashi, My Eternal Rival!"; Transliteration: "Kakashi, Waga Eien no Raibaru yo" (Japanese: カカシ、我が永遠のライバルよ)	Directed by : Yuusuke Onoda; Storyboarded by : Kiyomu Fukuda	Junki Takegami	Hiromi Yoshinuma	December 22, 2011	May 10, 2014
242	21	"Naruto's Vow"; Transliteration: "Naruto no Chikai" (Japanese: ナルトの誓い)	Directed by : Naoki Horiuchi; Storyboarded by : Tsutomu Naniwa	Yuka Miyata	Konomi Sakurai & Naoki Takahashi	December 28, 2011	May 17, 2014

=== Season 12 (2012) ===
No. overall	No. in season	Title	Directed by	Written by	Animation directed by	Original release date	English air date
Nine-Tails Taming and Karmic Encounters
243	1	"Land Ahoy! Is this the Paradise Island?"; Transliteration: "Jōriku! Rakuen no Shima?" (Japanese: 上陸! 楽園の島?)	Hiroshi Yamazaki	Katsuhiko Chiba	Kengo Matsumoto	January 5, 2012	May 24, 2014
244	2	"Killer Bee and Motoi"; Transliteration: "Kirā Bī to Motoi" (Japanese: キラービーとモトイ)	Directed by : Hideki Takayama; Storyboarded by : Yutaka Kagawa	Shin Yoshida	Beom-Seok Hong & Kouji Furuya	January 12, 2012	May 31, 2014
245	3	"The Next Challenge! Naruto vs. The Nine Tails"; Transliteration: "Saranaru Shiren! Naruto VS Kyūbi!!" (Japanese: さらなる試練! ナルトVS九尾!!)	Kanryou Kishikawa	Junki Takegami	Chiyuki Tanaka	January 19, 2012	June 7, 2014
246	4	"The Orange Spark"; Transliteration: "Orenji-iro no Kagayaki" (Japanese: オレンジ色の輝き)	Masahiko Murata	Yasuyuki Suzuki	Shigeki Kawai	January 26, 2012	June 14, 2014
247	5	"Target: Nine Tails"; Transliteration: "Nerawa-reta Kyūbi" (Japanese: 狙われた九尾)	Directed by : Hisashi Ishii; Storyboarded by : Shinji Satou	Junki Takegami	Hong Rong & Yuuko Ishizaki	February 2, 2012	June 21, 2014
248	6	"The Fourth Hokage's Death Match!"; Transliteration: "Yondaime no Shitō!!" (Japanese: 四代目の死闘!!)	Masaaki Kumagai	Junki Takegami	Hiroyuki Yamashita	February 9, 2012	June 28, 2014
249	7	"Thank You"; Transliteration: "Arigatō" (Japanese: ｢ありがとう｣)	Chikara Sakurai	Junki Takegami	Masayuki Kouda	February 9, 2012	July 5, 2014
250	8	"Battle in Paradise! Odd Beast vs. The Monster!"; Transliteration: "Chinjū VS Kaijin! Rakuen no Tatakai!" (Japanese: 珍獣VS怪人! 楽園の戦い!)	Kiyomu Fukuda	Masahiro Hikokubo	Ik-Hyun Eum	February 16, 2012	July 12, 2014
251	9	"The Man Named Kisame"; Transliteration: "Kisame to Iu Otoko" (Japanese: 鬼鮫という男)	Directed by : Ken'ichi Nishida; Storyboarded by : Yutaka Kagawa	Shin Yoshida	Kumiko Horikoshi	February 23, 2012	July 19, 2014
252	10	"The Angelic Herald of Death"; Transliteration: "Shi e Izanau Tenshi" (Japanese: 死へいざなう天使)	Hayato Date	Katsuhiko Chiba	Hiroyuki Yamashita	March 1, 2012	July 26, 2014
253	11	"The Bridge to Peace"; Transliteration: "Heiwa e no Kakehashi" (Japanese: 平和への懸け橋)	Directed by : Yuusuke Onoda; Storyboarded by : Yoshihiro Sugai	Katsuhiko Chiba	Hiromi Yoshinuma	March 8, 2012	August 2, 2014
254	12	"The Super Secret S-Rank Mission"; Transliteration: "Doesu-kyū Gokuhi Ninmu" (Japanese: ドS級極秘任務)	Kanryou Kishikawa	Yasuyuki Suzuki	Kengo Matsumoto	March 15, 2012	August 9, 2014
255	13	"The Artist Returns"; Transliteration: "Geijutsuka Futatabi" (Japanese: 芸術家再び)	Directed by : Hideki Takayama; Storyboarded by : Toshiyasu Furukawa	Yasuyuki Suzuki	Ken'ichi Hirata & Kouji Furuya	March 22, 2012	August 16, 2014
256	14	"Assemble! Allied Shinobi Forces!"; Transliteration: "Shūketsu! Shinobi Rengōgun!" (Japanese: 集結! 忍連合軍!)	Hisashi Ishii	Masahiro Hikokubo	Hong Rong & Yuuko Ishizaki	March 29, 2012	August 23, 2014
Recap: Two Fates
257	15	"Meeting"; Transliteration: "Deai" (Japanese: 出会い)	Directed by : Shigeki Kawai; Storyboarded by : Shinji Satou	Junki Takegami	Kayano Tomizawa	April 5, 2012	August 30, 2014
258	16	"Rivals"; Transliteration: "Raibaru" (Japanese: ライバル)	Kiyomu Fukuda	Junki Takegami	Ik-Hyun Eum	April 12, 2012	September 6, 2014
259	17	"Rift"; Transliteration: "Kiretsu" (Japanese: 亀裂)	Directed by : Noriyuki Abe; Storyboarded by : Shinji Satou	Junki Takegami	Kumiko Horikoshi	April 19, 2012	September 13, 2014
260	18	"Parting"; Transliteration: "Ribetsu" (Japanese: 離別)	Directed by : Yuusuke Onoda; Storyboarded by : Yoshihiro Sugai	Katsuhiko Chiba	Hiromi Yoshinuma	April 26, 2012	September 20, 2014
Nine-Tails Taming and Karmic Encounters
261	19	"For My Friend"; Transliteration: "Tomo no Tame ni" (Japanese: 友のために)	Directed by : Naoki Horiuchi; Storyboarded by : Masahiro Hosoda	Masahiro Hikokubo	Konomi Sakurai & Naoki Takahashi	May 3, 2012	September 27, 2014
262	20	"War Begins"; Transliteration: "Kaisen!" (Japanese: 開戦!)	Directed by : Masaaki Kumagai; Storyboarded by : Yutaka Kagawa	Shin Yoshida	Masayuki Kouda	May 10, 2012	October 4, 2014
263	21	"Sai and Shin"; Transliteration: "Sai to Shin" (Japanese: サイとシン)	Hisashi Ishii	Shin Yoshida	Hong Rong, Yuuko Ishizaki & Hiroki Abe	May 17, 2012	October 11, 2014
264	22	"Secrets of the Reanimation Jutsu"; Transliteration: "Edo Tensei no Himitsu" (Japanese: 穢土転生の秘密)	Kiyomu Fukuda	Yasuyuki Suzuki	Ik-Hyun Eum	May 24, 2012	October 18, 2014
265	23	"An Old Nemesis Returns"; Transliteration: "Shukuteki to no Saikai" (Japanese: 宿敵との再会)	Directed by : Yuusuke Onoda; Storyboarded by : Yoshihiro Sugai	Shin Yoshida	Yukiko Iwata	May 31, 2012	October 25, 2014
266	24	"The First and Last Opponent"; Transliteration: "Saisho no Teki, Saigo no Teki" (Japanese: 最初の敵, 最後の敵)	Kanryou Kishikawa	Shin Yoshida	Kayano Tomizawa	June 7, 2012	November 1, 2014
267	25	"The Brilliant Military Advisor of the Hidden Leaf"; Transliteration: "Konoha no Tensai Gunshi" (Japanese: 木ノ葉の天才軍師)	Directed by : Hideki Takayama; Storyboarded by : Yutaka Kagawa	Masahiro Hikokubo	Ken'ichi Hirata & Kouji Furuya	June 21, 2012	November 8, 2014
268	26	"Battleground!"; Transliteration: "Sorezore no Gekisen!!" (Japanese: それぞれの激戦!!)	Hisashi Ishii	Masahiro Hikokubo	Hong Rong, Yuuko Ishizaki & Hiroki Abe	June 28, 2012	November 15, 2014
269	27	"Forbidden Words"; Transliteration: "Enu-Jī Wādo" (Japanese: NGワード)	Directed by : Katsumi Ono; Storyboarded by : Kiyomu Fukuda	Masahiro Hikokubo	Bum-Chul Chang, Hye-Jung Hue & Hong-Kun Park	July 5, 2012	November 22, 2014
270	28	"Golden Bonds"; Transliteration: "Konjiki no Kizuna" (Japanese: 金色の絆)	Directed by : Shigeki Kawai; Storyboarded by : Atsushi Nigorikawa	Masahiro Hikokubo	Masayuki Kouda	July 19, 2012	November 29, 2014
Standalone side story
271	29	"Road to Sakura" (Note: Stylized in all caps)	Directed by : Yuusuke Onoda; Storyboarded by : Yutaka Kagawa & Jun'ya Koshiba	Yuka Miyata	Eiichi Tokura & Yukiko Iwata	July 26, 2012	December 6, 2014
Nine-Tails Taming and Karmic Encounters
272	30	"Mifune vs. Hanzō" (Japanese: ミフネVS半蔵)	Directed by : Tsuneo Tominaga; Storyboarded by : Noriyuki Abe	Katsuhiko Chiba	Hiroki Abe, Min-Seop Shin & Boo-Hee Lee	August 2, 2012	December 13, 2014
273	31	"True Kindness"; Transliteration: "Hontō no Yasashisa" (Japanese: 本当 の優しさ)	Kanryou Kishikawa	Yasuyuki Suzuki	Kanayo Tomizawa	August 9, 2012	December 20, 2014
274	32	"The Complete Ino-Shika-Cho Formation!"; Transliteration: "Kanpeki na Inoshikachō!!" (Japanese: 完璧な猪鹿蝶!!)	Kiyomu Fukuda	Yasuyuki Suzuki	Ik-Hyun Eum	August 9, 2012	December 27, 2014
275	33	"A Message from the Heart"; Transliteration: "Kokoro no Naka no Tegami" (Japanese: 心の中の手紙)	Directed by : Mitsutaka Noshitani; Storyboarded by : Jun'ya Koshiba	Shin Yoshida	Min-Seop Shin, Yuuko Ishizaki & Hideyuki Yoshida	August 16, 2012	January 3, 2015

=== Season 13 (2012–13) ===
No. overall	No. in season	Title	Directed by	Written by	Animation directed by	Original release date	English air date
The Seven Shinobi Swordsmen
276	1	"Attack of the Gedo Statue"; Transliteration: "Gedō Mazō no Shūrai" (Japanese: 外道魔像の襲来)	Directed by : Hideki Takayama; Storyboarded by : Shinji Satou	Katsuhiko Chiba	Beom-Seok Hong	August 23, 2012	January 10, 2015
277	2	"Unison Sign"; Transliteration: "Wakai no In" (Japanese: 和解の印)	Directed by : Masaaki Kumagai; Storyboarded by : Jun'ya Koshiba	Masahiro Hikokubo	Masayuki Kouda	August 30, 2012	January 17, 2015
278	3	"Medic Ninja in Danger"; Transliteration: "Nerawareta Iryō Ninja" (Japanese: 狙われた医療忍者)	Directed by : Tsuneo Tominaga; Storyboarded by : Hisashi Ishii	Yasuyuki Suzuki	Hiroki Abe, Min-Seop Shin & Yuuko Ishizaki	September 6, 2012	January 24, 2015
279	4	"White Zetsu's Trap"; Transliteration: "Shiro Zetsu no Torappu" (Japanese: 白ゼツの罠)	Directed by : Yuusuke Onoda; Storyboarded by : Tetsuto Saitou	Shin Yoshida	Mamoru Yokota	September 13, 2012	January 31, 2015
280	5	"Aesthetics of an Artist"; Transliteration: "Geijutsuka no Bigaku" (Japanese: 芸術家の美学)	Directed by : Shigeki Kawai; Storyboarded by : Yutaka Kagawa	Katsuhiko Chiba	Masaya Onishi	September 20, 2012	February 7, 2015
281	6	"The Allied Mom Force!!"; Transliteration: "Kā-chan Rengōgun!!" (Japanese: 母ちゃん連合軍!!)	Kiyomu Fukuda	Yasuyuki Suzuki	Ik-Hyun Eum	September 27, 2012	February 14, 2015
282	7	"The Secret Origin of the Ultimate Tag Team!"; Transliteration: "Hiwa: Saikyō Taggu!!" (Japanese: 秘話・最強タッグ!!)	Hisashi Ishii	Masahiro Hikokubo	Min-Seop Shin & Yuuko Ishizaki	October 4, 2012	February 21, 2015
283	8	"Two Suns"; Transliteration: "Futatsu no Taiyō!!" (Japanese: 二つの太陽!!)	Directed by : Jun Nakagawa; Storyboarded by : Jun'ya Koshiba	Masahiro Hikokubo	Beom-Seok Hong	October 11, 2012	February 28, 2015
284	9	"The Helmet Splitter: Jinin Akebino!"; Transliteration: "Kabutowari! Akebino Jinin" (Japanese: 兜割! 通草野餌人)	Kanryou Kishikawa	Junki Takegami	Kanayo Tomizawa	October 18, 2012	March 7, 2015
285	10	"User of the Scorch Style: Pakura of the Sand!"; Transliteration: "Shakuton Tsukai! Sunagakure no Pakura" (Japanese: 灼遁使い! 砂隠れのパクラ)	Masaaki Kumagai	Katsuhiko Chiba	Kumiko Horikoshi	October 25, 2012	March 14, 2015
286	11	"Things You Can't Get Back"; Transliteration: "Torimodosenai Mono" (Japanese: 取り戻せないもの)	Directed by : Mitsutaka Noshitani; Storyboarded by : Shinji Satou	Junki Takegami	Hiroki Abe, Min-Seop Shin & Yuuko Ishizaki	November 1, 2012	March 21, 2015
287	12	"One Worth Betting On"; Transliteration: "Kakeru ni Ataisuru mono" (Japanese: 賭けるに値する者)	Directed by : Sumito Sasaki; Storyboarded by : Shinji Satou	Junki Takegami	Mamoru Yokota	November 1, 2012	March 28, 2015
288	13	"Danger: Jinpachi and Kushimaru!"; Transliteration: "Kyōi, Jinpachi - Kushimaru Konbi!!" (Japanese: 脅威、甚八・串丸コンビ!!)	Kiyomu Fukuda	Masahiro Hikokubo	Ik-Hyun Eum	November 8, 2012	April 4, 2015
289	14	"The Lightning Blade: Ameyuri Ringo!"; Transliteration: "Raitō!! Ringo Ameyuri" (Japanese: 雷刀!! 林檎雨由利)	Directed by : Yoshihide Ibata; Storyboarded by : Hisashi Ishii	Shin Yoshida	Hiroki Abe, Min-Seop Shin, Boo-Hee Lee & Yuuko Ishizaki	November 15, 2012	April 11, 2015
Power
290	15	"Power - Episode 1" (Japanese: 「力-Chikara-」episode1)	Toshiyuki Tsuru	Toshiyuki Tsuru	Hirofumi Suzuki	November 22, 2012	April 18, 2015
291	16	"Power - Episode 2" (Japanese: 「力-Chikara-」episode2)	Directed by : Masaaki Kumagai, Chikara Sakurai & Toshiyuki Tsuru; Storyboarded by : Toshiyuki Tsuru & Tsuneo Kobayashi	Toshiyuki Tsuru	Takahiro Chiba, Kumiko Horikoshi, Hirofumi Suzuki & Hiromi Okazaki	November 29, 2012	April 25, 2015
292	17	"Power - Episode 3" (Japanese: 「力-Chikara-」episode3)	Yuu Yamashita	Toshiyuki Tsuru	Yasuhiko Kanezuka & Masaya Onishi	December 6, 2012	May 2, 2015
293	18	"Power - Episode 4" (Japanese: 「力-Chikara-」episode4)	Toshiyuki Tsuru	Toshiyuki Tsuru	Toshiyuki Tsuru & Hiroto Tanaka	December 13, 2012	May 9, 2015
294	19	"Power - Episode 5" (Japanese: 「力-Chikara-」episode5)	Kazunori Mizuno	Toshiyuki Tsuru	Hirofumi Suzuki & Masayuki Kouda	December 20, 2012	May 16, 2015
295	20	"Power - Final Episode" (Japanese: 「力-Chikara-」episode Final)	Toshiyuki Tsuru	Toshiyuki Tsuru	Hiroyuki Yamashita, Kengo Matsumoto, Hiroto Tanaka & Hirofumi Suzuki	January 10, 2013	May 23, 2015

=== Season 14 (2013) ===
No. overall	No. in season	Title	Directed by	Written by	Animation directed by	Original release date	English air date
The Fourth Great Ninja War: Assailants From Afar
296	1	"Naruto Enters the Battle!"; Transliteration: "Naruto, Sansen!!" (Japanese: ナルト、参戦!!)	Directed by : Jun Nakagawa; Storyboarded by : Shinji Satou	Yasuyuki Suzuki	Beom-Seok Hong	January 17, 2013	May 30, 2015
297	2	"A Father's Hope, A Mother's Love"; Transliteration: "Chichi no Omoi, Haha no Ai" (Japanese: 父の想い、母の愛)	Directed by : Mitsutaka Noshitani; Storyboarded by : Yutaka Kagawa	Shin Yoshida	Hiroki Abe, Min-Seop Shin & Yuuko Ishizaki	January 24, 2013	June 6, 2015
298	3	"Contact! Naruto vs. Itachi"; Transliteration: "Tsuini Sesshoku!! Naruto tai Itachi" (Japanese: ついに接触!! ナルトVSイタチ)	Directed by : Sumito Sasaki; Storyboarded by : Jun'ya Koshiba	Yasuyuki Suzuki	Mamoru Yokota, Yukiko Iwata, Eiichi Tokura & Hiroyuki Kamura	January 31, 2013	June 13, 2015
299	4	"The Acknowledged One"; Transliteration: "Mitomerareshi Mono" (Japanese: 認められし者)	Directed by : Hidetoshi Takahashi; Storyboarded by : Takayuki Inagaki	Yasuyuki Suzuki	Ik-Hyun Eum	February 7, 2013	June 20, 2015
300	5	"The Mizukage, the Giant Clam, and the Mirage"; Transliteration: "Mizukage to Ōhamaguri to Shinkirō" (Japanese: 水影と蜃(おおはまぐり)と蜃気楼)	Directed by : Shigeki Kawai; Storyboarded by : Shinji Satou	Katsuhiko Chiba	Masaya Onishi	February 14, 2013	June 27, 2015
301	6	"Paradox"; Transliteration: "Mujun" (Japanese: 矛盾)	Hisashi Ishii	Masahiro Hikokubo	Hiroki Abe, Min-Seop Shin & Yuuko Ishizaki	February 21, 2013	July 4, 2015
302	7	"Terror: The Steam Imp"; Transliteration: "Kyōfu: Jōki Bōi" (Japanese: 恐怖・蒸危暴威(ジョウキボーイ))	Directed by : Kanryou Kishikawa; Storyboarded by : Yukihiro Matsushita	Junki Takegami	Kumiko Horikoshi	February 28, 2013	July 11, 2015
303	8	"Ghosts from the Past"; Transliteration: "Kako no Bōrei" (Japanese: 過去の亡霊)	Directed by : Kazunori Mizuno; Storyboarded by : Yukihiro Matsushita	Masahiro Hikokubo	Masayuki Kouda	March 7, 2013	July 18, 2015
304	9	"The Underworld Transfer Jutsu"; Transliteration: "Yomi Tenshin no Jutsu" (Japanese: 黄泉転身(よみてんしん)の術)	Directed by : Yoshihide Ibata; Storyboarded by : Shinji Satou	Masahiro Hikokubo	Min-Seop Shin & Yuuko Ishizaki	March 14, 2013	July 25, 2015
305	10	"The Vengeful"; Transliteration: "Fukushūsha" (Japanese: 復讐者)	Directed by : Jun Nakagawa; Storyboarded by : Naomi Nakayama	Masahiro Hikokubo	Ken'ichi Hirata, Kouji Furuya & Min-Ho Jang	March 21, 2013	August 8, 2015
306	11	"The Heart's Eye"; Transliteration: "Kokoro no Me" (Japanese: 心の目)	Directed by : Shigeki Kawai; Storyboarded by : Shinji Satou	Shin Yoshida	Kayano Tomizawa & Masaya Onishi	March 28, 2013	August 15, 2015
307	12	"Fade into the Moonlight"; Transliteration: "Gekkō ni Kiyu" (Japanese: 月光に消ゆ)	Directed by : Sumito Sasaki; Storyboarded by : Yoshihiro Sugai	Yuka Miyata	Miho Yoshioka	April 4, 2013	August 22, 2015
308	13	"Crescent Moonlight"; Transliteration: "Mikazuki no Yoru" (Japanese: 三日月の夜)	Directed by : Hidetoshi Takahashi; Storyboarded by : Yukihiro Matsushita	Yuka Miyata	Ik-Hyun Eum	April 11, 2013	August 29, 2015
309	14	"The A-Rank Mission: Food Fight"; Transliteration: "Ē-Ranku Ninmu: Gozen Jiai" (Japanese: A級任務・御膳試合)	Directed by : Mitsutaka Noshitani; Storyboarded by : Yutaka Kagawa	Katsuhiko Chiba	Min-Seop Shin & Yuuko Ishizaki	April 18, 2013	September 5, 2015
310	15	"The Fallen Castle"; Transliteration: "Rakujō" (Japanese: 落城)	Masaaki Kumagai	Katsuhiko Chiba	Yasuhiko Kanezuka & Seiko Asai	April 25, 2013	September 12, 2015
Standalone side story
311	16	"Prologue of Road to Ninja"	Kazunori Mizuno	Yuka Miyata	Kengo Matsumoto	May 2, 2013	September 19, 2015
The Fourth Great Ninja War: Assailants From Afar
312	17	"The Old Master and the Dragon's Eye"; Transliteration: "Rōjin to Ryū no Me" (Japanese: 老人と龍の目)	Directed by : Naoki Horiuchi; Storyboarded by : Yutaka Kagawa	Hideto Tanaka	Hirokazu Ishino, Naoki Takahashi & Ichirou Ogawa	May 9, 2013	September 26, 2015
313	18	"Rain Followed by Snow, with Some Lightning"; Transliteration: "Ame Nochi Yuki, Tokidoki Kaminari" (Japanese: 雨のち雪, ときどき雷)	Directed by : Kanryou Kishikawa; Storyboarded by : Yukihiro Matsushita	Yasuyuki Suzuki	Masaya Onishi	May 16, 2013	October 3, 2015
314	19	"The Sad Sun Shower"; Transliteration: "Kanashī Tenkiame" (Japanese: 悲しい天気雨)	Directed by : Fumiaki Usui; Storyboarded by : Yutaka Kagawa	Yasuyuki Suzuki	Kouji Furuya, Ken'ichi Hirata & Min-Ho Jang	May 23, 2013	October 10, 2015
315	20	"Lingering Snow"; Transliteration: "Nagoriyuki" (Japanese: 名残雪)	Hisashi Ishii	Yasuyuki Suzuki	Min-Seop Shin, Hiroki Abe & Yuuko Ishizaki	May 30, 2013	October 17, 2015
316	21	"The Reanimated Allied Forces"; Transliteration: "Edo Tensei Rengōgun!!" (Japanese: 穢土転生連合軍!!)	Directed by : Sumito Sasaki; Storyboarded by : Yukihiro Matsushita	Katsuhiko Chiba	Miho Yoshioka	June 6, 2013	October 24, 2015
317	22	"Shino vs. Torune!"; Transliteration: "Shino tai Torune!!" (Japanese: シノVSトルネ!!)	Directed by : Shigeki Kawai; Storyboarded by : Atsushi Wakabayashi	Katsuhiko Chiba	Kumiko Horikoshi	June 13, 2013	October 31, 2015
318	23	"A Hole in the Heart: The Other Jinchuriki"; Transliteration: "Kokoro no Ana - Mō Hitori no Jinchūriki" (Japanese: 心の穴 もう一人の人柱力)	Directed by : Hiroaki Nishimura; Storyboarded by : Naoki Hishikawa	Shin Yoshida	Ik-Hyun Eum	June 20, 2013	November 7, 2015
319	24	"The Soul Living Inside the Puppet"; Transliteration: "Kugutsu ni Yadoru Tamashī" (Japanese: 傀儡に宿る魂)	Kazunori Mizuno	Masahiro Hikokubo	Masayuki Kouda	June 27, 2013	November 14, 2015
320	25	"Run, Omoi!"; Transliteration: "Hashire Omoi" (Japanese: 走れオモイ)	Directed by : Kazuma Satou; Storyboarded by : Yukihiro Matsushita	Yasuyuki Suzuki	Min-Seop Shin, Yuuko Ishizaki & Hiroki Abe	July 4, 2013	November 21, 2015

=== Season 15 (2013–14) ===
No. overall	No. in season	Title	Directed by	Written by	Animation directed by	Original release date	English air date
The Fourth Great Ninja War: Sasuke and Itachi
321	1	"Reinforcements Arrive"; Transliteration: "Zōen Tōchaku" (Japanese: 増援到着)	Directed by : Naoki Horiuchi; Storyboarded by : Yutaka Kagawa	Katsuhiko Chiba	Naoki Takahashi, Shunsuke Terasawa & Ichirou Ogawa	July 18, 2013	November 28, 2015
322	2	"Madara Uchiha"; Transliteration: "Uchiha Madara" (Japanese: うちはマダラ)	Hiroyuki Yamashita	Shin Yoshida	Hiroyuki Yamashita	July 25, 2013	December 5, 2015
323	3	"The Five Kage Assemble"; Transliteration: "Gokage Shūketsu...!!" (Japanese: 五影集結...!!)	Directed by : Yoshihiro Sugai; Storyboarded by : Yukihiro Matsushita	Yuka Miyata	Daiki Handa	August 1, 2013	December 12, 2015
324	4	"The Unbreakable Mask and the Shattered Bubble"; Transliteration: "Warenai Kamen・Wareta Shabondama" (Japanese: 割れない仮面・割れたシャボン玉)	Masaaki Kumagai	Junki Takegami	Masaya Onishi	August 8, 2013	December 18, 2015
325	5	"Jinchūriki tai Jinchūriki!!" (Japanese: 人柱力VS人柱力!!)	Hisashi Ishii	Yasuyuki Suzuki	Min-Seop Shin & Yuuko Ishizaki	August 15, 2013	December 24, 2015
326	6	"Four Tails, the King of Sage Monkeys"; Transliteration: "Yonbi: Sen'en no Ō" (Japanese: 四尾・仙猿(せんえん)の王)	Directed by : Naomi Nakayama; Storyboarded by : Kanryou Kishikawa	Katsuhiko Chiba	Kumiko Horikoshi	August 22, 2013	December 31, 2015
327	7	"Nine Tails"; Transliteration: "Kyūbi" (Japanese: 九尾)	Directed by : Hiroaki Nishimura; Storyboarded by : Yutaka Kagawa	Yuka Miyata	Ik-Hyun Eum	August 29, 2013	January 7, 2016
328	8	"Kurama" (Japanese: 九喇嘛)	Directed by : Shigeki Kawai; Storyboarded by : Yukihiro Matsushita	Yuka Miyata	Yuuri Ichinose & Anna Yamaguchi	August 29, 2013	January 14, 2016
329	9	"Two-Man Team"; Transliteration: "Tsū-Man Seru" (Japanese: ツーマンセル)	Directed by : Kazunori Mizuno; Storyboarded by : Tomoyuki Kurokawa	Shin Yoshida	Masayuki Kouda	September 5, 2013	January 21, 2016
330	10	"The Promise of Victory"; Transliteration: "Shōri e no Yogen" (Japanese: 勝利への予言)	Directed by : Chikao Tominaga; Storyboarded by : Hisashi Ishii	Masahiro Hikokubo	Min-Seop Shin & Yuuko Ishizaki	September 12, 2013	January 28, 2016
331	11	"Eyes That See in the Dark"; Transliteration: "Yami o Miru Me" (Japanese: 闇を見る眼)	Directed by : Naoki Horiuchi; Storyboarded by : Yutaka Kagawa	Katsuhiko Chiba	Naoki Takahashi	September 19, 2013	February 4, 2016
332	12	"A Will of Stone"; Transliteration: "Ishi no Ishi" (Japanese: 石の意志)	Directed by : Masaaki Kumagai; Storyboarded by : Yukihiro Matsushita	Yasuyuki Suzuki	Masaya Onishi	September 26, 2013	February 11, 2016
333	13	"The Risks of the Reanimation Jutsu"; Transliteration: "Edo Tensei no Risuku" (Japanese: 穢土転生のリスク)	Directed by : Shigeru Ishii; Storyboarded by : Shinji Satou	Shin Yoshida	Daiki Handa	October 3, 2013	February 18, 2016
334	14	"Sibling Tag Team"; Transliteration: "Kyōdai, Taggu!!" (Japanese: 兄弟、共闘(タッグ)!!)	Directed by : Kazunori Mizuno; Storyboarded by : Tetsuto Saitou	Katsuhiko Chiba	Kumiko Horikoshi	October 10, 2013	February 25, 2016
335	15	"To Each Their Own Leaf"; Transliteration: "Tagai no Konoha" (Japanese: 互いの木ノ葉)	Directed by : Mitsutaka Noshitani; Storyboarded by : Hisashi Ishii	Yasuyuki Suzuki	Min-Seop Shin & Yuuko Ishizaki	October 24, 2013	March 4, 2016
336	16	"Kabuto Yakushi"; Transliteration: "Yakushi Kabuto" (Japanese: 薬師カブト)	Directed by : Shigeki Kawai; Storyboarded by : Yutaka Kagawa	Masahiro Hikokubo	Masayuki Kouda	October 31, 2013	March 11, 2016
337	17	"The Izanami Activated"; Transliteration: "Hatsudō: Izanami" (Japanese: 発動・イザナミ)	Hiroaki Nishimura	Masahiro Hikokubo	Ik-Hyun Eum	November 7, 2013	March 18, 2016
338	18	"Izanagi and Izanami"; Transliteration: "Izanagi to Izanami" (Japanese: イザナギとイザナミ)	Directed by : Kazunori Mizuno; Storyboarded by : Yukihiro Matsushita	Masahiro Hikokubo	Yuuri Ichinose & Seiko Asai	November 14, 2013	March 25, 2016
339	19	"I Will Love You Always"; Transliteration: "Omae o Zutto Aishiteiru" (Japanese: お前をずっと愛している)	Directed by : Atsushi Nigorikawa; Storyboarded by : Shinji Satou	Yuka Miyata	Masaya Onishi & Kumiko Horikoshi	November 21, 2013	May 2, 2021 (Note: English air dates of Naruto: Shippuden from this point onward refer to its first broadcast on U.S. television on Adult Swim's Toonami programming block.)
340	20	"Reanimation Jutsu: Release!"; Transliteration: "Edo Tensei: Kai" (Japanese: 穢土転生・解)	Directed by : Eiko Nishi; Storyboarded by : Hisashi Ishii	Katsuhiko Chiba	Min-Seop Shin & Yuuko Ishizaki	November 28, 2013	May 9, 2021
341	21	"Orochimaru's Return"; Transliteration: "Fukkatsu!! Orochimaru" (Japanese: 復活!! 大蛇丸)	Directed by : Naoki Horiuchi; Storyboarded by : Yukihiro Matsushita	Yasuyuki Suzuki	Naoki Takahashi & Shinichi Suzuki	December 5, 2013	May 16, 2021
342	22	"Secret of the Transportation Technique"; Transliteration: "Jikūkan Ninjutsu no Himitsu" (Japanese: 時空間忍術の秘密)	Masaaki Kumagai	Shin Yoshida	Daisuke Tsumagari & Anna Yamaguchi	December 12, 2013	May 23, 2021
343	23	"Who Are You?"; Transliteration: "Temē wa Dare da!!" (Japanese: てめーは誰だ!!)	Directed by : Kazuya Iwata; Storyboarded by : Shinji Satou	Masahiro Hikokubo	Daiki Handa	December 19, 2013	May 30, 2021
344	24	"Obito and Madara"; Transliteration: "Obito to Madara" (Japanese: オビトとマダラ)	Directed by : Kazunori Mizuno; Storyboarded by : Yukihiro Matsushita	Yasuyuki Suzuki	Kumiko Horikoshi	January 9, 2014	June 6, 2021
345	25	"I'm in Hell"; Transliteration: "Ore wa Jigoku ni Iru" (Japanese: オレは地獄に居る)	Hiroyuki Yamashita	Katsuhiko Chiba	Hiroyuki Yamashita	January 16, 2014	June 13, 2021
346	26	"World of Dreams"; Transliteration: "Yume no Sekai" (Japanese: 夢の世界)	Directed by : Eiko Nishi; Storyboarded by : Hisashi Ishii	Shin Yoshida	Min-Seop Shin & Yuuko Ishizaki	January 23, 2014	June 20, 2021
347	27	"Creeping Shadow"; Transliteration: "Shinobiyoru Kage" (Japanese: 忍び寄る影)	Directed by : Sekito Kanno; Storyboarded by : Shinji Satou	Shin Yoshida	Ik-Hyun Eum	January 23, 2014	June 27, 2021
348	28	"The New Akatsuki"; Transliteration: "Shinsei: "Akatsuki"" (Japanese: 新生・"暁")	Atsushi Nigorikawa	Shin Yoshida	Kumiko Horikoshi & Masaya Onishi	January 30, 2014	July 4, 2021

=== Season 16 (2014) ===
No. overall	No. in season	Title	Directed by	Written by	Animation directed by	Original release date	English air date
Kakashi: Shadow of the ANBU Black Ops
349	1	"A Mask That Hides The Heart"; Transliteration: "Kokoro o Kakusu Men" (Japanese: 心を隠す面)	Directed by : Naoki Horiuchi; Storyboarded by : Yukihiro Matsushita	Junki Takegami	Naoki Takahashi & Shinichi Suzuki	February 6, 2014	July 11, 2021
350	2	"Minato's Death"; Transliteration: "Minato no Shi" (Japanese: ミナトの死)	Directed by : Daisuke Kurose; Storyboarded by : Toshihiko Masuda	Junki Takegami	Seiko Asai	February 13, 2014	July 18, 2021
351	3	"Hashirama's Cells"; Transliteration: "Hashirama Saibō" (Japanese: 柱間細胞)	Directed by : Kazuya Iwata; Storyboarded by : Tetsuto Saitou	Junki Takegami	Daiki Handa	February 20, 2014	July 25, 2021
352	4	"The Rogue Ninja Orochimaru"; Transliteration: "Nukenin・Orochimaru" (Japanese: 抜け忍・大蛇丸)	Directed by : Yoshihiko Iwata; Storyboarded by : Hisashi Ishii	Yasuyuki Suzuki	Min-Seop Shin & Yūko Ishizaki	February 27, 2014	August 1, 2021
353	5	"Orochimaru's Test Subject"; Transliteration: "Orochimaru no Jikkentai" (Japanese: 大蛇丸の実験体)	Masaaki Kumagai	Yasuyuki Suzuki	Hiroyuki Yamashita	March 6, 2014	August 15, 2021
354	6	"Their Own Paths"; Transliteration: "Sorezore no Michi" (Japanese: それぞれの道)	Directed by : Naoki Hishikawa; Storyboarded by : Hiroki Takagi	Yasuyuki Suzuki	Ik-Hyun Eum	March 6, 2014	August 22, 2021
355	7	"The Targeted Sharingan"; Transliteration: "Nerawareta Sharingan" (Japanese: 狙われた写輪眼)	Directed by : Naoki Horiuchi; Storyboarded by : Yukihiro Matsushita	Katsuhiko Chiba	Naoki Takahashi & Hiroaki Kawaguchi	March 13, 2014	August 29, 2021
356	8	"A Shinobi of the Leaf"; Transliteration: "Konoha no Shinobi" (Japanese: 木ノ葉の忍)	Kazunori Mizuno	Katsuhiko Chiba	Masaya Onishi & Kumiko Horikoshi	March 20, 2014	September 5, 2021
357	9	"An Uchiha ANBU"; Transliteration: "Anbu no Uchiha" (Japanese: 暗部のうちは)	Directed by : Takuma Suzuki; Storyboarded by : Tetsuto Saitou	Katsuhiko Chiba	Min-Seop Shin & Yūko Ishizaki	April 3, 2014	September 12, 2021
358	10	"Coup d'État"; Transliteration: "Kū d'etā" (Japanese: クーデター)	Atsushi Nigorikawa	Katsuhiko Chiba	Seiko Asai & Yūri Ichinose	April 10, 2014	September 19, 2021
359	11	"The Night of the Tragedy"; Transliteration: "Sangeki no Yoru" (Japanese: 惨劇の夜)	Directed by : Fukutarou Hattori; Storyboarded by : Yukihiro Matsushita	Katsuhiko Chiba	Daiki Handa & Eiichi Tokura	April 17, 2014	September 26, 2021
360	12	"Jōnin Leader"; Transliteration: "Tantō Jōnin" (Japanese: 担当上忍)	Directed by : Daisuke Kurose; Storyboarded by : Shinji Satō	Masahiro Hikokubo	Hiroyuki Yamashita & Masaya Onishi	April 24, 2014	October 3, 2021
361	13	"Team 7"; Transliteration: "Dainanahan" (Japanese: 第七班)	Directed by : Masayuki Yamada; Storyboarded by : Tetsuto Saitou	Masahiro Hikokubo	Ik-Hyun Eum	May 8, 2014	November 7, 2021

=== Season 17 (2014) ===
No. overall	No. in season	Title	Directed by	Written by	Animation directed by	Original release date	English air date
The Fourth Great Ninja War: The Return of Team 7
362	1	"Kakashi's Resolve"; Transliteration: "Kakashi no Ketsui" (Japanese: カカシの決意)	Directed by : Takuma Suzuki; Storyboarded by : Hisashi Ishii	Junki Takegami	Min-Seop Shin & Yūko Ishizaki	May 15, 2014	November 14, 2021
363	2	"The Allied Shinobi Forces Jutsu"; Transliteration: "Shinobi Rengōgun no Jutsu!" (Japanese: 忍連合軍の術!)	Gorou Sessha	Hideto Tanaka	Tatsuya Koyanagi	May 22, 2014	November 21, 2021
364	3	"The Ties That Bind"; Transliteration: "Tsunagareru-mono" (Japanese: 繋がれるもの)	Masaaki Kumagai	Shin Yoshida	Kumiko Horikoshi	June 5, 2014	November 28, 2021
365	4	"Those Who Dance in the Shadows"; Transliteration: "Shinobimau Mono-tachi" (Japanese: 忍び舞う者たち)	Directed by : Naoki Horiuchi; Storyboarded by : Shinji Satō	Katsuhiko Chiba	Naoki Takahashi & Shinichi Suzuki	June 12, 2014	December 12, 2021
366	5	"The All-Knowing"; Transliteration: "Subete o Shiru Mono-tachi" (Japanese: 全てを知る者たち)	Directed by : Kazunori Mizuno; Storyboarded by : Shinji Satō	Masahiro Hikokubo	Seiko Asai	June 19, 2014	January 9, 2022
367	6	"Hashirama and Madara"; Transliteration: "Hashirama to Madara" (Japanese: 柱間とマダラ)	Directed by : Kazuya Iwata; Storyboarded by : Yukihiro Matsushita	Shin Yoshida	Eiichi Tokura	July 3, 2014	January 9, 2022
368	7	"The Era of Warring States"; Transliteration: "Sengoku Jidai" (Japanese: 戦国時代)	Atsushi Nigorikawa	Shin Yoshida	Yūri Ichinose & Masaya Onishi	July 10, 2014	January 9, 2022
369	8	"My True Dream"; Transliteration: "Hontō no Yume" (Japanese: 本当の夢)	Directed by : Yoshihiko Iwata; Storyboarded by : Hisashi Ishii	Masahiro Hikokubo	Min-Seop Shin & Yūko Ishizaki	July 24, 2014	January 16, 2022
370	9	"Sasuke's Answer"; Transliteration: "Sasuke no Kotae" (Japanese: サスケの答え)	Directed by : Yoshihiro Yanagiya; Storyboarded by : Shinji Satō	Masahiro Hikokubo	Kumiko Horikoshi	July 31, 2014	January 16, 2022
371	10	"Hole"; Transliteration: "Kazaana" (Japanese: 風穴)	Directed by : Masayuki Yamada; Storyboarded by : Yukihiro Matsushita	Katsuhiko Chiba	Ik-Hyun Eum	August 7, 2014	January 23, 2022
372	11	"Something to Fill the Hole"; Transliteration: "Umeru-mono" (Japanese: 埋めるもの)	Directed by : Masaaki Kumagai; Storyboarded by : Shinji Satō	Katsuhiko Chiba & Yuka Miyata	Kirara Hoshizora	August 14, 2014	January 23, 2022

=== Season 18 (2014) ===
No. overall	No. in season	Title	Directed by	Written by	Animation directed by	Original release date	English air date
The Fourth Great Ninja War: Obito Uchiha
373	1	"Team 7, Assemble!"; Transliteration: "Dainanahan, Shūketsu!!" (Japanese: 第七班、集結!!)	Directed by : Takuma Suzuki; Storyboarded by : Hisashi Ishii	Yuka Miyata	Min-Seop Shin & Yūko Ishizaki	August 21, 2014	January 30, 2022
374	2	"The New Three-Way Deadlock"; Transliteration: "Aratanaru Sansukumi" (Japanese: 新たなる三竦み)	Directed by : Naoki Horiuchi; Storyboarded by : Yukihiro Matsushita	Yasuyuki Suzuki	Naoki Takahashi & Shinichi Suzuki	August 28, 2014	January 30, 2022
375	3	"Kakashi vs. Obito"; Transliteration: "Kakashi tai Obito" (Japanese: カカシVSオビト)	Hiroyuki Yamashita	Yasuyuki Suzuki & Shin Yoshida	Hiroyuki Yamashita	September 4, 2014	February 6, 2022
Extra edition
376	4	"The Directive to Take the Nine-Tails!"; Transliteration: "Kyūbi Gōdatsu Shirei" (Japanese: 九尾強奪指令)	Directed by : Kazuya Iwata; Storyboarded by : Shinji Satō	Yasuyuki Suzuki	Daiki Handa	September 11, 2014	February 13, 2022
377	5	"Naruto vs. Mecha Naruto"; Transliteration: "Naruto tai Meka Naruto" (Japanese: ナルト対メカナルト)	Directed by : Kazunori Mizuno; Storyboarded by : Shinji Satō	Yasuyuki Suzuki	Yūri Ichinose & Masaya Onishi	September 11, 2014	February 20, 2022
The Fourth Great Ninja War: Obito Uchiha
378	6	"The Ten Tails' Jinchuriki"; Transliteration: "Jūbi no Jinchūriki" (Japanese: 十尾の人柱力)	Directed by : Takuma Suzuki; Storyboarded by : Yukihiro Matsushita	Shin Yoshida	Min-Seop Shin & Yūko Ishizaki	September 18, 2014	February 27, 2022
379	7	"An Opening"; Transliteration: "Toppakō" (Japanese: 突破口)	Atsushi Nigorikawa	Katsuhiko Chiba	Kumiko Horikoshi	September 25, 2014	March 6, 2022
380	8	"The Day Naruto Was Born"; Transliteration: "Naruto ga Umareta Hi" (Japanese: ナルトが生まれた日)	Directed by : Masayuki Yamada; Storyboarded by : Shinji Satō	Yasuyuki Suzuki	Ik-Hyun Eum	October 2, 2014	March 13, 2022
381	9	"The Divine Tree"; Transliteration: "Shinju" (Japanese: 神樹)	Directed by : Yoshihiro Yanagiya; Storyboarded by : Jun Kamiya	Yuka Miyata	Seiko Asai & Zenjirou Ukulele	October 9, 2014	March 20, 2022
382	10	"A Shinobi's Dream"; Transliteration: "Shinobi no Yume" (Japanese: 忍の夢)	Directed by : Takuma Suzuki; Storyboarded by : Hisashi Ishii	Masahiro Hikokubo	Min-Seop Shin & Yūko Ishizaki	October 16, 2014	March 27, 2022
383	11	"Pursuing Hope"; Transliteration: "Saki o Ou" (Japanese: 希望(さき)を追う)	Directed by : Masaaki Kumagai; Storyboarded by : Yukihiro Matsushita	Katsuhiko Chiba	Tatsuya Koyanagi, Yūri Ichinose & Kumiko Horikoshi	October 23, 2014	April 3, 2022
384	12	"A Heart Filled With Comrades"; Transliteration: "Nakama de Michita Kokoro" (Japanese: 仲間で満ちた心)	Directed by : Naoki Horiuchi; Storyboarded by : Toshihiko Masuda	Yasuyuki Suzuki	Naoki Takahashi & Shinichi Suzuki	October 30, 2014	April 10, 2022
385	13	"Obito Uchiha"; Transliteration: "Uchiha Obito" (Japanese: うちはオビト)	Kazunori Mizuno	Junki Takegami & Shin Yoshida	Shiro Kudaka & Masaya Onishi	November 6, 2014	April 17, 2022
386	14	"I'm Always Watching"; Transliteration: "Chanto Miteru" (Japanese: ちゃんと見てる)	Kazuya Iwata	Junki Takegami & Shin Yoshida	Daiki Handa	November 13, 2014	April 24, 2022
387	15	"The Promise That Was Kept"; Transliteration: "Mamorareta Yakusoku" (Japanese: 守られた約束)	Atsushi Nigorikawa	Yuka Miyata	Chiyuki Tanaka	November 20, 2014	May 1, 2022
388	16	"My First Friend"; Transliteration: "Saisho no Tomo" (Japanese: 最初の友)	Directed by : Yoshihiko Iwata; Storyboarded by : Shinji Satō	Masahiro Hikokubo	Min-Seop Shin & Yūko Ishizaki	November 27, 2014	May 8, 2022
Standalone side story
389	17	"The Adored Elder Sister"; Transliteration: "Akogare no Nē-sama" (Japanese: 憧れの姉さま)	Maki Odaira	Yuka Miyata	Kumiko Horikoshi	December 4, 2014	May 8, 2022
390	18	"Hanabi's Decision"; Transliteration: "Hanabi no Ketsui" (Japanese: ハナビの決意)	Directed by : Kiyoshi Murayama; Storyboarded by : Yukihiro Matsushita	Yuka Miyata	Takayoshi Hayashi, Hiroki Abe, Shigeki Awai & Hae-Ran Shin	December 4, 2014	May 15, 2022
The Fourth Great Ninja War: Obito Uchiha
391	19	"Madara Uchiha Arises"; Transliteration: "Uchiha Madara, Tatsu" (Japanese: うちはマダラ、立つ)	Masaaki Kumagai	Yasuyuki Suzuki	Yūri Ichinose & Daisuke Tsumagari	December 11, 2014	May 22, 2022
392	20	"The Hidden Heart"; Transliteration: "Ura no Kokoro" (Japanese: 裏の心)	Directed by : Masayuki Yamada; Storyboarded by : Shinji Satō	Katsuhiko Chiba	Ik-Hyun Eum	December 18, 2014	May 29, 2022
393	21	"A True Ending"; Transliteration: "Hontō no Owari" (Japanese: 本当の終わり)	Directed by : Kazunori Mizuno; Storyboarded by : Yukihiro Matsushita	Shin Yoshida	Masaya Onishi & Mai Toda	December 25, 2014	June 5, 2022

=== Season 19 (2015) ===
No. overall	No. in season	Title	Directed by	Written by	Animation directed by	Original release date	English air date
In Naruto's Footsteps: Friends' Paths
394	1	"The New Chunin Exams"; Transliteration: "Aratanaru Chūnin Shiken" (Japanese: 新たなる中忍試験)	Directed by : Naoki Horiuchi; Storyboarded by : Yukihiro Matsushita	Junki Takegami	Naoki Takahashi & Shinichi Suzuki	January 8, 2015	June 12, 2022
395	2	"The Chunin Exams Begin"; Transliteration: "Chūnin Shiken, Kaishi!" (Japanese: 中忍試験、開始!)	Directed by : Taisuke Mamoru; Storyboarded by : Toshihiko Masuda	Junki Takegami	Chiyuki Tanaka & Yoshihiro Maeda	January 15, 2015	June 19, 2022
396	3	"The Three Questions"; Transliteration: "Mittsu no Mondai" (Japanese: 三つの問題)	Directed by : Kazuya Iwata; Storyboarded by : Sumio Watabane	Katsuhiko Chiba	Daiki Handa	January 22, 2015	June 19, 2022
397	4	"One Worthy as a Leader"; Transliteration: "Rīdā ni Fusawashī Mono" (Japanese: リーダーに相応しい者)	Atsushi Nigorikawa	Katsuhiko Chiba	Kumiko Horikoshi	January 29, 2015	June 26, 2022
398	5	"The Night Before the Second Exam"; Transliteration: "Niji Shiken, Zen'ya" (Japanese: 二次試験、前夜)	Directed by : Tsuneo Tominaga; Storyboarded by : Shinji Satō	Shin Yoshida	Min-Seop Shin & Yūko Ishizaki	February 5, 2015	June 26, 2022
399	6	"Demon Desert Survival"; Transliteration: "Ma no Sabaku no Sabaibaru" (Japanese: 魔の砂漠のサバイバル)	Directed by : Tokuji Kaneko; Storyboarded by : Shinji Satō	Shin Yoshida	Shiro Kudaka & Yūri Ichinose	February 12, 2015	July 10, 2022
400	7	"As a Taijutsu User"; Transliteration: "Taijutsu Tsukai to shite..." (Japanese: 体術使いとして...)	Directed by : Kentarou Fujita; Storyboarded by : Toshihiko Masuda	Shin Yoshida	Yumenosuke Tokuda	February 19, 2015	July 10, 2022
401	8	"The Ultimate"; Transliteration: "Kiwameshi mono" (Japanese: 極めし者)	Kazunori Mizuno	Shin Yoshida	Masaya Onishi, Zenjirou Ukulele & Hiromi Okazaki	February 26, 2015	July 17, 2022
402	9	"Escape vs. Pursuit"; Transliteration: "Tōsō tai Tsuigeki" (Japanese: 逃走VS追跡)	Directed by : Tsuneo Tominaga; Storyboarded by : Yukihiro Matsushita	Yasuyuki Suzuki	Min-Seop Shin & Yūko Ishizaki	March 5, 2015	July 17, 2022
403	10	"Unwavering Gutsiness"; Transliteration: "Akiramenai Dokonjō" (Japanese: 諦めないド根性)	Directed by : Masayuki Yamada; Storyboarded by : Shinji Satō	Yasuyuki Suzuki	Kumiko Horikoshi	March 12, 2015	July 24, 2022
404	11	"Tenten's Troubles"; Transliteration: "Tenten no Nayami" (Japanese: テンテンの悩み)	Directed by : Akira Shimizu; Storyboarded by : Toshihiko Masuda	Katsuhiko Chiba	Naoki Takahashi & Shinichi Suzuki	March 19, 2015	July 31, 2022
405	12	"The Imprisoned Pair"; Transliteration: "Tojikomerareta Futari" (Japanese: 閉じ込められた二人)	Atsushi Nigorikawa	Katsuhiko Chiba	Yūri Ichinose, Shiro Kudaka & Masaya Onishi	March 26, 2015	August 7, 2022
406	13	"The Place Where I Belong"; Transliteration: "Jibun no Ibasho" (Japanese: 自分の居場所)	Directed by : Fukutarou Hattori & Kazuya Iwata; Storyboarded by : Sumio Watabane	Masahiro Hikokubo	Tetsurō Taira & Masako Miura	April 2, 2015	August 14, 2022
407	14	"The Yamanaka Clan: Secret Ninjutsu"; Transliteration: "Yamanaka Ichizoku・Hiden Ninjutsu" (Japanese: 山中一族・秘伝忍術)	Tokuji Kaneko	Masahiro Hikokubo	Zenjirou Ukulele, Anna Yamaguchi, Masaya Onishi & Kumiko Horikoshi	April 9, 2015	August 21, 2022
408	15	"The Cursed Puppet"; Transliteration: "Noroi no Ningyō" (Japanese: 呪いの人形)	Directed by : Tsuneo Tominaga; Storyboarded by : Shinji Satō	Hideto Tanaka & Yuka Miyata	Min-Seop Shin & Yūko Ishizaki	April 16, 2015	August 28, 2022
409	16	"Their Backs"; Transliteration: "Futari no Senaka" (Japanese: 二人の背中)	Directed by : Yoshinori Odaka; Storyboarded by : Shinji Satō	Hideto Tanaka & Yuka Miyata	Kumiko Horikoshi	April 23, 2015	September 4, 2022
410	17	"The Hidden Plot Set Into Motion"; Transliteration: "Ugokidashita Inbō" (Japanese: 動き出した陰謀)	Kentarō Fujita	Junki Takegami	Yumenosuke Tokuda & Yusuke Adachi	April 30, 2015	September 11, 2022
411	18	"The Targeted Tailed Beast"; Transliteration: "Nerawareta Bijū" (Japanese: 狙われた尾獣)	Directed by : Masayuki Yamada; Storyboarded by : Toshihiko Masuda	Junki Takegami	Mifumi Tomita, Tokuyuki Matsutake & Itsuko Takeda	May 7, 2015	September 25, 2022
412	19	"Neji's Judgment"; Transliteration: "Neji no Handan" (Japanese: ネジの判断)	Directed by : Tsuneo Tominaga; Storyboarded by : Toshihiko Masuda	Junki Takegami	Min-Seop Shin & Yūko Ishizaki	May 14, 2015	October 2, 2022
413	20	"Hopes Entrusted to the Future"; Transliteration: "Mirai ni Takusu Omoi" (Japanese: 未来に託す思い)	Kazunori Mizuno	Junki Takegami	Masaya Onishi & Yūri Ichinose	May 21, 2015	October 9, 2022

=== Season 20 (2015–16) ===
No. overall	No. in season	Title	Directed by	Written by	Animation directed by	Original release date	English air date
Infinite Tsukuyomi: The Invocation
414	1	"On the Brink of Death"; Transliteration: "Shi no Kiwa" (Japanese: 死の際)	Directed by : Akira Shimizu; Storyboarded by : Hayato Date	Katsuhiko Chiba	Naoki Takahashi & Shinichi Suzuki	May 28, 2015	October 16, 2022
415	2	"The Two Mangekyo"; Transliteration: "Futatsu no Mangekyō" (Japanese: 二つの万華鏡)	Atsushi Nigorikawa	Shin Yoshida	Anna Yamaguchi, Shiro Kudaka & Emi Watanabe	June 4, 2015	October 23, 2022
416	3	"The Formation of Team Minato"; Transliteration: "Kessei・Minato Han" (Japanese: 結成・ミナト班)	Kazuya Iwata	Shin Yoshida	Tetsurō Taira & Masako Miura	June 11, 2015	October 23, 2022
417	4	"You'll Be My Backup"; Transliteration: "Omae wa Bakkuappu da" (Japanese: お前はバックアップだ)	Directed by : Tokuji Kaneko; Storyboarded by : Shinji Satō	Shin Yoshida	Kumiko Horikoshi	June 25, 2015	November 6, 2022
418	5	"The Blue Beast vs. Six Paths Madara"; Transliteration: "Aoki Mōjū tai Rikudō Madara" (Japanese: 碧き猛獣VS六道マダラ)	Directed by : Takuma Suzuki; Storyboarded by : Toshihiko Masuda	Yasuyuki Suzuki	Min-Seop Shin & Yūko Ishizaki	July 2, 2015	November 13, 2022
419	6	"Papa's Youth"; Transliteration: "Papa no Seishun" (Japanese: パパの青春)	Kentarō Fujita	Yasuyuki Suzuki	Shigeki Awai & Yusuke Adachi	July 9, 2015	November 20, 2022
420	7	"The Eight Inner Gates Formation"; Transliteration: "Hachimon Tonkō no Jin" (Japanese: 八門遁甲の陣)	Masayuki Yamada	Yuka Miyata	Masaya Onishi & Yūri Ichinose	July 23, 2015	December 4, 2022
421	8	"The Sage of the Six Paths"; Transliteration: "Rikudō Sennin" (Japanese: 六道仙人)	Directed by : Kazunori Mizuno; Storyboarded by : Shinobu Tagashira	Katsuhiko Chiba	Noriko Ohtake, Mariko Emori & Anna Yamaguchi	July 30, 2015	December 11, 2022
Standalone side story
422	9	"The Ones Who Will Inherit"; Transliteration: "Uketsugareru Mono" (Japanese: 受け継がれるもの)	Directed by : Takuma Suzuki; Storyboarded by : Shinji Satō	Yuka Miyata	Min-Seop Shin & Yūko Ishizaki	August 6, 2015	December 18, 2022
423	10	"Naruto's Rival"; Transliteration: "Naruto no Raibaru" (Japanese: ナルトのライバル)	Directed by : Akira Shimizu; Storyboarded by : Shinji Satō	Yuka Miyata	Kumiko Horikoshi	August 6, 2015	January 8, 2023
Infinite Tsukuyomi: The Invocation
424	11	"To Rise Up"; Transliteration: "Tatsu" (Japanese: 立つ)	Directed by : Tomokazu Iwasaki; Storyboarded by : Yukihiro Matsushita	Yasuyuki Suzuki	Naoki Takahashi & Shinichi Suzuki	August 13, 2015	January 15, 2023
425	12	"The Infinite Dream"; Transliteration: "Mugen no Yume" (Japanese: 無限の夢)	Directed by : Ayataka Tanemura & Kazuya Iwata; Storyboarded by : Masahiro Sasaki	Katsuhiko Chiba	Tetsurō Taira & Eiichi Tokura	August 20, 2015	January 22, 2023
426	13	"The Infinite Tsukuyomi"; Transliteration: "Mugen Tsukuyomi" (Japanese: 無限月読)	Directed by : Sumito Sasaki; Storyboarded by : Atsushi Nigorikawa	Shuto Tanaka	Masaya Onishi & Yūri Ichinose	August 27, 2015	January 29, 2023
427	14	"To the Dream World"; Transliteration: "Yume no Sekai e" (Japanese: 夢の世界へ)	Directed by : Hiroyuki Tsuchiya; Storyboarded by : Yukihiro Matsushita	Yuka Miyata	Min-Seop Shin, Yūko Ishizaki & Hyun-Woo Joo	September 3, 2015	February 5, 2023
428	15	"Where Tenten Belongs"; Transliteration: "Tenten no Ibasho" (Japanese: テンテンの居場所)	Masayuki Yamada	Yuka Miyata	Zenjirou Ukulele, Mariko Emori & Naoki Takahashi	September 3, 2015	February 12, 2023
429	16	"Killer Bee Rappūden: Part 1"; Transliteration: "Kirābī Rappūden・Ten no Maki" (Japanese: キラービー落風伝・天の巻)	Directed by : Yoshinobu Tokumoto; Storyboarded by : Toshihiko Masuda	Katsuhiko Chiba	Shigeki Awai & Yusuke Adachi	September 10, 2015	March 5, 2023
430	17	"Killer Bee Rappūden: Part 2"; Transliteration: "Kirābī Rappūden・Chi no Maki" (Japanese: キラービー落風伝・地の巻)	Kazunori Mizuno	Katsuhiko Chiba	Kumiko Horikoshi & Masaya Onishi	September 17, 2015	March 12, 2023
431	18	"To See That Smile, Just One More Time"; Transliteration: "Ano Egao o Mōichido" (Japanese: あの笑顔をもう一度)	Directed by : Kiyoshi Murayama; Storyboarded by : Shinji Satō	Yuka Miyata	Takayoshi Hayashi & Dae-Hoon Kim	September 24, 2015	March 19, 2023
Jiraiya Shinobi Handbook: The Tale of Naruto the Hero
432	19	"The Loser Ninja"; Transliteration: "Ochikobore Shinobi" (Japanese: 落ちこぼれ忍者)	Directed by : Akira Shimizu; Storyboarded by : Yukihiro Matsushita	Junki Takegami	Naoki Takahashi & Shinichi Suzuki	October 1, 2015	March 26, 2023
433	20	"The Search Mission"; Transliteration: "Shutsugeki・Tansaku Ninmu" (Japanese: 出撃・探索任務)	Maki Odaira	Junki Takegami & Yasuyuki Suzuki	Zenjirou Ukulele & Yūri Ichinose	October 8, 2015	April 2, 2023
434	21	"Team Jiraiya"; Transliteration: "Chīmu・Jiraiya" (Japanese: チーム・ジライヤ)	Directed by : Takuma Suzuki; Storyboarded by : Yukihiro Matsushita	Junki Takegami & Yasuyuki Suzuki	Min-Seop Shin, Hyung-Shik Shin, Jung-Duk Seo & Yūko Ishizaki	October 15, 2015	April 9, 2023
435	22	"Order of Priority"; Transliteration: "Yūsen Jun'i" (Japanese: 優先順位)	Directed by : Kazuya Iwata; Storyboarded by : Shinobu Tagashira	Junki Takegami & Yasuyuki Suzuki	Masaya Onishi, Mariko Emori & Chiyuki Tanaka	October 22, 2015	April 16, 2023
436	23	"The Masked Man"; Transliteration: "Kamen no Otoko" (Japanese: 仮面の男)	Directed by : Ayataka Tanemura; Storyboarded by : Sumio Watabane	Junki Takegami, Yasuyuki Suzuki & Yuka Miyata	Tetsurō Taira & Eiichi Tokura	November 5, 2015	April 23, 2023
437	24	"The Sealed Power"; Transliteration: "Fūin Sareshi Chikara" (Japanese: 封印されし力)	Directed by : Masayuki Yamada; Storyboarded by : Yukihiro Matsushita	Junki Takegami & Yasuyuki Suzuki	Kumiko Horikoshi	November 12, 2015	April 30, 2023
438	25	"The Rules or a Comrade"; Transliteration: "Okite ka, Nakama ka" (Japanese: 掟か、仲間か)	Directed by : Kiyoshi Murayama; Storyboarded by : Yukihiro Matsushita	Junki Takegami & Yasuyuki Suzuki	Dae-Hoon Kim & Takayoshi Hayashi	November 19, 2015	May 7, 2023
439	26	"The Child of Prophecy"; Transliteration: "Yogen no Ko" (Japanese: 予言の子)	Directed by : Shinnosuke Imagawa; Storyboarded by : Toshihiko Masuda	Junki Takegami & Yasuyuki Suzuki	Shigeki Awai & Yusuke Adachi	November 26, 2015	May 14, 2023
440	27	"The Caged Bird"; Transliteration: "Kago no Tori" (Japanese: 籠の鳥)	Kazunori Mizuno	Junki Takegami	Zenjirou Ukulele, Mariko Emori & Retsu Okawara	December 3, 2015	May 21, 2023
441	28	"Returning Home"; Transliteration: "Kikan" (Japanese: 帰還)	Directed by : Toshihiro Maeya; Storyboarded by : Yukihiro Matsushita	Yuka Miyata	Min-Seop Shin & Yūko Ishizaki	December 10, 2015	June 4, 2023
442	29	"The Mutual Path"; Transliteration: "Tagai no Michi" (Japanese: 互いの道)	Maki Odaira	Yuka Miyata	Masaya Onishi, Yūri Ichinose & Daisuke Tsumagari	December 17, 2015	June 11, 2023
443	30	"The Difference in Power"; Transliteration: "Chikara no Sa" (Japanese: 力の差)	Directed by : Yasuhiro Akamatsu; Storyboarded by : Yukihiro Matsushita	Yuka Miyata	Naoki Takahashi, Shinichi Suzuki & Asuka Tsubuki	December 24, 2015	June 18, 2023
444	31	"Leaving the Village"; Transliteration: "Sato Nuke" (Japanese: 里抜け)	Directed by : Kazuya Iwata; Storyboarded by : Yukihiro Matsushita	Yasuyuki Suzuki	Hiroyuki Yamashita	January 14, 2016	June 25, 2023
445	32	"Pursuers"; Transliteration: "Otte" (Japanese: 追手)	Directed by : Ayataka Tanemura; Storyboarded by : Sumio Watabane	Junki Takegami & Yasuyuki Suzuki	Eiichi Tokura & Tetsurō Taira	January 21, 2016	July 9, 2023
446	33	"Collision"; Transliteration: "Shōtotsu" (Japanese: 衝突)	Masayuki Yamada	Yasuyuki Suzuki	Kumiko Horikoshi	January 28, 2016	July 16, 2023
447	34	"Another Moon"; Transliteration: "Mōhitotsu no Tsuki" (Japanese: もう一つの月)	Directed by : Toshihiro Maeya; Storyboarded by : Yukihiro Matsushita	Junki Takegami & Yasuyuki Suzuki	Yūko Ishizaki, Min-Seop Shin, Jung-Duk Seo & Hyung-Shik Shin	February 4, 2016	July 23, 2023
448	35	"Comrade"; Transliteration: "Nakama" (Japanese: 仲間)	Directed by : Kiyoshi Murayama; Storyboarded by : Toshihiko Masuda	Yasuyuki Suzuki	Seung Hee Yoo & Aya Tanaka	February 11, 2016	July 30, 2023
449	36	"The Shinobi Unite"; Transliteration: "Shinobitachi no Kyōen" (Japanese: 忍達の共演)	Directed by : Takeyuki Yanase; Storyboarded by : Yukihiro Matsushita	Junki Takegami	Shigeki Awai & Yusuke Adachi	February 18, 2016	August 6, 2023
450	37	"Rival"; Transliteration: "Raibaru" (Japanese: 好敵手(ライバル))	Kazunori Mizuno	Yasuyuki Suzuki	Megumi Tomita, Daisuke Tsumagari & Zenjirou Ukulele	February 25, 2016	August 13, 2023
Itachi Shinden: Book of Light and Darkness
451	38	"Birth and Death"; Transliteration: "Umareru Inochi, Shinu Inochi" (Japanese: 生まれる命、死ぬ命)	Directed by : Kazuya Iwata; Storyboarded by : Shinji Satō	Katsuhiko Chiba	Retsu Okawara & Masaya Onishi	March 3, 2016	August 20, 2023
452	39	"The Genius"; Transliteration: "Isai" (Japanese: 異才)	Directed by : Norihiko Nagahama; Storyboarded by : Shinji Satō	Katsuhiko Chiba	Naoki Takahashi, Shinichi Suzuki & Yūko Fuji	March 10, 2016	September 10, 2023
453	40	"The Pain of Living"; Transliteration: "Inochi no Itami" (Japanese: 命の痛み)	Maki Odaira	Masahiro Hikokubo	Yūri Ichinose & Chiyuki Tanaka	March 17, 2016	September 17, 2023
454	41	"Shisui's Request"; Transliteration: "Shisui no Irai" (Japanese: シスイの依頼)	Directed by : Yūsuke Onoda; Storyboarded by : Yoshihiro Sugai	Masahiro Hikokubo	Tetsurō Taira, Eiichi Tokura & Masako Miura	March 24, 2016	September 17, 2023
455	42	"Moonlit Night"; Transliteration: "Tsukiyo" (Japanese: 月夜)	Masahiko Murata	Katsuhiko Chiba	Masahiko Murata	April 7, 2016	September 24, 2023
456	43	"The Darkness of the Akatsuki"; Transliteration: "Akatsuki no Yami" (Japanese: 暁の闇)	Directed by : Kiyoshi Murayama; Storyboarded by : Yukihiro Matsushita	Katsuhiko Chiba	Seung Hee Yoo & Aya Tanaka	April 14, 2016	September 24, 2023
457	44	"Partner"; Transliteration: "Aibō" (Japanese: 相棒)	Directed by : Shōgo Arai; Storyboarded by : Shinobu Tagashira	Katsuhiko Chiba	Shigeki Awai & Ruriko Watabane	April 21, 2016	October 1, 2023
458	45	"Truth"; Transliteration: "Makoto" (Japanese: 真)	Masayuki Yamada	Katsuhiko Chiba	Kumiko Horikoshi	April 28, 2016	October 1, 2023

=== Season 21 (2016) ===
No. overall	No. in season	Title	Directed by	Written by	Animation directed by	Original release date	English air date
The Origins of Ninshū: The Two Souls, Indra and Ashura
459	1	"She of the Beginning"; Transliteration: "Hajimari no Mono" (Japanese: はじまりのもの)	Hisashi Ishii	Masahiro Hikokubo	Min-Seop Shin & Yūko Ishizaki	May 5, 2016	October 8, 2023
460	2	"Kaguya Ōtsutsuki"; Transliteration: "Ōtsutsuki Kaguya" (Japanese: 大筒木カグヤ)	Kazunori Mizuno	Shin Yoshida	Emi Miyaji, Mariko Emori & Masaya Onishi	May 12, 2016	October 8, 2023
461	3	"Hagoromo and Hamura"; Transliteration: "Hagoromo to Hamura" (Japanese: ハゴロモとハムラ)	Directed by : Naoki Horiuchi; Storyboarded by : Yukihiro Matsushita	Shin Yoshida	Naoki Takahashi, Shinichi Suzuki & Yūko Fuji	May 19, 2016	October 15, 2023
462	4	"A Fabricated Past"; Transliteration: "Tsukurareta Kako" (Japanese: 造られた過去)	Directed by : Ayataka Tanemura; Storyboarded by : Toshihiko Masuda	Shin Yoshida	Tetsurō Taira & Eiichi Tokura	May 26, 2016	October 15, 2023
463	5	"The No. 1 Most Unpredictable Ninja"; Transliteration: "Igai-sei Nanbāwan!" (Japanese: 意外性ナンバーワン!)	Fujii Toshiro	Masahiro Hikokubo	Fujii Toshiro	June 2, 2016	October 22, 2023
464	6	"Ninshū: The Ninja Creed"; Transliteration: "Ninshū" (Japanese: 忍宗)	Directed by : Kiyoshi Murayama; Storyboarded by : Yukihiro Matsushita	Shin Yoshida	Seung Hee Yoo & Aya Tanaka	June 9, 2016	October 22, 2023
465	7	"Ashura and Indra"; Transliteration: "Ashura to Indora" (Japanese: アシュラとインドラ)	Maki Odaira	Shin Yoshida	Chiyuki Tanaka & Kumiko Horikoshi	June 16, 2016	November 12, 2023
466	8	"The Tumultuous Journey"; Transliteration: "Shiren no Tabi" (Japanese: 試練の旅)	Directed by : Masayuki Yamada; Storyboarded by : Yukihiro Matsushita	Shin Yoshida	Yūri Ichinose, Masaya Onishi & Zenjirou Ukulele	June 30, 2016	November 19, 2023
467	9	"Ashura's Decision"; Transliteration: "Ashura no Ketsui" (Japanese: アシュラの決意)	Directed by : Atsushi Nigorikawa; Storyboarded by : Yukihiro Matsushita	Shin Yoshida	Mariko Emori, Emi Miyaji & Huang Chengxi	July 7, 2016	November 26, 2023
468	10	"The Successor"; Transliteration: "Kōkeisha" (Japanese: 後継者)	Kazuya Iwata	Shin Yoshida	Eiichi Tokura & Tetsurō Taira	July 21, 2016	December 3, 2023
Standalone side story
469	11	"A Special Mission"; Transliteration: "Tokubetsu Ninmu" (Japanese: 特別任務)	Masayuki Kouda	Shuto Tanaka	Masayuki Kouda & Anna Yamaguchi	July 28, 2016	December 10, 2023
The Chapter of Naruto and Sasuke
470	12	"Connecting Thoughts"; Transliteration: "Tsunagaru Omoi" (Japanese: 繋がる想い)	Masaaki Kumagai	Katsuhiko Chiba	Kumiko Horikoshi	August 4, 2016	December 17, 2023
471	13	"The Two of Them... Always"; Transliteration: "Futari o Chanto" (Japanese: 二人をちゃんと)	Directed by : Naoki Horiuchi; Storyboarded by : Yukihiro Matsushita	Yuka Miyata	Naoki Takahashi & Yūko Fuji	August 11, 2016	January 7, 2024
472	14	"You Better..."; Transliteration: "Omae wa Kanarazu" (Japanese: お前は必ず)	Kazunori Mizuno	Yuka Miyata	Masaya Onishi & Retsu Okawara	August 18, 2016	January 14, 2024
473	15	"The Sharingan Revived"; Transliteration: "Sharingan, Futatabi" (Japanese: 写輪眼、再び)	Directed by : Kiyoshi Murayama; Storyboarded by : Yukihiro Matsushita	Yuka Miyata	Jae Weon Lee, Seung Hee Yoo, & Aya Tanaka	August 25, 2016	January 21, 2024
474	16	"Congratulations"; Transliteration: "Omedetō" (Japanese: おめでとう)	Masahiko Murata	Masahiro Hikokubo	Emi Miyaji, Yūri Ichinose & Anna Yamaguchi	September 1, 2016	January 28, 2024
475	17	"The Valley of the End"; Transliteration: "Shūmatsu no Tani" (Japanese: 終末の谷)	Yoshihiro Sugai	Katsuhiko Chiba	Tsunetoshi Takahashi	September 8, 2016	February 4, 2024
476	18	"The Final Battle"; Transliteration: "Saigo no Tatakai" (Japanese: 最後の戦い)	Hiroyuki Yamashita	Yuka Miyata	Hiroyuki Yamashita	September 29, 2016	February 11, 2024
477	19	"Naruto and Sasuke"; Transliteration: "Naruto to Sasuke" (Japanese: ナルトとサスケ)	Hiroyuki Yamashita	Yuka Miyata	Hiroyuki Yamashita	September 29, 2016	February 18, 2024
478	20	"The Unison Sign"; Transliteration: "Wakai no In" (Japanese: 和解の印)	Toshiyuki Tsuru	Yasuaki Kurozu	Toshiyuki Tsuru & Hiroto Tanaka	October 6, 2016	February 25, 2024
479	21	"Naruto Uzumaki!!"; Transliteration: "Uzumaki Naruto!!" (Japanese: うずまきナルト！！)	Hayato Date	Yasuaki Kurozu	Yasuhiko Kanezuka & Hirofumi Suzuki	October 13, 2016	March 3, 2024

=== Season 22 (2016–17) ===
No. overall	No. in season	Title	Directed by	Written by	Animation directed by	Original release date	English air date
Nostalgic Days
480	1	"Naruto and Hinata" (Note: Originally in Latin script English and stylized in all caps with an interpunct in place of the word "and".)	Osamu Kobayashi	Osamu Kobayashi	Ichirou Uno	October 20, 2016	March 10, 2024
481	2	"Sasuke and Sakura"	Directed by : Mitsuto Yamaji; Storyboarded by : Osamu Kobayashi	Osamu Kobayashi	Akira Takeuchi & Gen Sato	October 27, 2016	March 24, 2024
482	3	"Gaara and Shikamaru"	Directed by : Osamu Sekita; Storyboarded by : Osamu Kobayashi	Osamu Kobayashi	Mayumi Oda & Hideki Natori	November 3, 2016	March 31, 2024
483	4	"Jiraiya and Kakashi"	Directed by : Taisuke Mamoru; Storyboarded by : Osamu Kobayashi	Osamu Kobayashi	Yūko Matsui & Yoko Suzuki	November 10, 2016	April 7, 2024
Sasuke Shinden: Book of Sunrise
484	5	"Part 1: The Exploding Human"; Transliteration: "Kibaku Ningen" (Japanese: 起爆人間)	Chiaki Kon	Masanao Akahoshi	Ichirou Uno, Minoru Murao, Ayako Satō & Hiroshi Tomioka	December 1, 2016	April 14, 2024
485	6	"Part 2: Coliseum"; Transliteration: "Koroshiamu" (Japanese: 闘技場(コロシアム))	Directed by : Ayumi Ono; Storyboarded by : Ryōji Fujiwara	Masanao Akahoshi	Hiroyuki Okuno, Shinichirou Minami, Minoru Morita & Miho Sekimoto	December 8, 2016	April 21, 2024
486	7	"Part 3: Fūshin" (Japanese: 風心(フウシン))	Shingo Okano	Masanao Akahoshi	Koji Yabuno, Hiroaki Imaki & Yoko Suzuki	December 15, 2016	April 28, 2024
487	8	"Part 4: The Ketsuryūgan"; Transliteration: "Ketsuryūgan" (Japanese: 血龍眼)	Osamu Sekita	Masanao Akahoshi	Hideki Natori & Mayumi Oda	December 22, 2016	May 5, 2024
488	9	"Part 5: The Last One"; Transliteration: "Saigo no Hitori" (Japanese: 最後の一人)	Chiaki Kon	Masanao Akahoshi	Nagakawa Momoko, Minoru Murao, Ayako Satō & Koji Yabuno	January 5, 2017	May 26, 2024
Shikamaru Hiden: A Cloud Drifting in Silent Darkness
489	10	"Part 1: The State of Affairs"; Transliteration: "Fūun" (Japanese: 風雲)	Toshinori Watanabe	Masaya Honda	Tomoyuki Kitamura & Myoung-Hun Park	January 12, 2017	June 2, 2024
490	11	"Part 2: Dark Clouds"; Transliteration: "An'un" (Japanese: 暗雲)	Directed by : Taiji Kawanishi; Storyboarded by : Toshinori Watanabe	Masaya Honda	Min-Seop Shin, Hyung-Sik Shin & Eun-Ham Kim	January 19, 2017	June 9, 2024
491	12	"Part 3: Recklessness"; Transliteration: "Yamikumo" (Japanese: 闇雲)	Directed by : Naoki Hishikawa; Storyboarded by : Yo Hong & Yuuki Ukai	Masaya Honda	Il-Sung Kim, Yoko Suzuki & Hiroaki Imaki	January 26, 2017	June 16, 2024
492	13	"Part 4: Cloud of Suspicion"; Transliteration: "Giun" (Japanese: 疑雲)	Directed by : Masayuki Matsumoto; Storyboarded by : Katsuyuki Kodera	Masaya Honda	Ho-Duk Lee & Sun-Yeong Seo	February 2, 2017	June 23, 2024
493	14	"Part 5: Dawn"; Transliteration: "Shinonome" (Japanese: 東雲)	Toshinori Watanabe	Masaya Honda	Myong-Hun Park, Jin-Won Seo, Joung-Kyoung Lee & Yoon-Joung Kim	February 9, 2017	June 30, 2024
Konoha Hiden: The Perfect Day for a Wedding
494	15	"Part 1: Naruto's Wedding"; Transliteration: "Naruto no Kekkon" (Japanese: ナルトの結婚)	Michisoku Matsuda	Kento Shimoyama	Megumi Tomita & Retsu Okawara	February 16, 2017	July 7, 2024
495	16	"Part 2: A Full-Powered Wedding Gift"; Transliteration: "Furu-Pawā Kekkon Iwai" (Japanese: フルパワー結婚祝い)	Masahiko Murata	Kento Shimoyama	Masahiko Murata	February 16, 2017	July 14, 2024
496	17	"Part 3: Steam and Food Pills"; Transliteration: "Yukemuri to Hyōrōgan" (Japanese: 湯けむりと兵糧丸)	Yoshihiro Sugai	Kento Shimoyama	Tsunetoshi Takahashi, Tetsurō Taira, Eiichi Tokura & Hirofumi Onodera	February 23, 2017	July 21, 2024
497	18	"Part 4: The Kazekage's Wedding Gift"; Transliteration: "Kazekage no Oiwai" (Japanese: 風影の御祝)	Maki Odaira	Kento Shimoyama	Chiyuki Tanaka	March 2, 2017	August 11, 2024
498	19	"Part 5: The Last Mission"; Transliteration: "Saigo no Ninmu" (Japanese: 最後の任務)	Directed by : Naoki Horiuchi; Storyboarded by : Yukihiro Matsushita	Kento Shimoyama	Naoki Takahashi & Yūko Fuji	March 9, 2017	August 18, 2024
499	20	"Part 6: The Outcome of the Secret Mission"; Transliteration: "Gokuhi Ninmu no Yukue" (Japanese: 極秘任務の行方)	Kazunori Mizuno	Kento Shimoyama	Kumiko Horikoshi	March 16, 2017	August 25, 2024
500	21	"Part 7: The Message"; Transliteration: "Iwai no Kotoba" (Japanese: 祝いの言葉)	Masahiko Murata	Kento Shimoyama	Koji Yabuno, Retsu Okawara & Anna Yamaguchi	March 23, 2017	September 1, 2024

== Home media release ==
In four regions, episodes from the series have been released on DVD and Blu-ray by single volumes and box sets. In Japan, twenty-six sets of volumes have been released based on which arc it represents. In North America, twelve single volumes and thirty-eight box sets have been released. In the United Kingdom, thirty-eight box sets and ten series sets have been released. In Australia and New Zealand, thirty-eight collections, five box sets, and a different collection of seven have been released.

=== DVD ===
==== Region 1 (North America) ====
===== Single volumes =====
Volume	Date	Discs	Episodes	Ref.
1	September 29, 2009	1	1–4	
2	October 27, 2009	1	5–8	
3	November 24, 2009	1	9–13	
4	December 8, 2009	1	14–17	
5	January 12, 2010	1	18–21	
6	February 9, 2010	1	22–26	
7	March 9, 2010	1	27–30	
8	April 6, 2010	1	31–34	
9	May 18, 2010	1	35–39	
10	June 1, 2010	1	40–43	
11	July 13, 2010	1	44–48	
12	August 10, 2010	1	49–53	

===== Box sets =====
Volume	Date	Discs	Episodes	Ref.
1	January 26, 2010	3	1–13	
2	April 20, 2010	3	14–26	
3	August 3, 2010	3	27–39	
4	October 19, 2010	3	40–53	
5	January 25, 2011	3	54–65	
6	April 26, 2011	3	66–77	
7	July 12, 2011	3	78–88	
8	October 11, 2011	3	89–100	
9	January 24, 2012	3	101–112	
10	April 10, 2012	3	113–126	
11	July 10, 2012	3	127–140	
12	October 9, 2012	3	141–153	
13	January 8, 2013	3	154–166	
14	April 23, 2013	3	167–179	
15	July 16, 2013	3	180–192	
16	October 8, 2013	2	193–205	
17	January 14, 2014	2	206–218	
18	April 8, 2014	2	219–231	
19	July 8, 2014	2	232–244	
20	October 14, 2014	2	245–257	
21	January 20, 2015	2	258–270	
22	April 21, 2015	2	271–283	
23	July 28, 2015	2	284–296	
24	November 10, 2015	2	297–309	
25	January 26, 2016	2	310–322	
26	April 5, 2016	2	323–335	
27	July 5, 2016	2	336–348	
28	October 4, 2016	2	349–361	
29	January 17, 2017	2	362–374	
30	April 4, 2017	2	375–388	
31	June 27, 2017	2	389–402	
32	October 10, 2017	2	403–416	
33	January 9, 2018	2	417–430	
34	May 1, 2018	2	431–444	
35	August 28, 2018	2	445–458	
36	December 4, 2018	2	459–472	
37	March 26, 2019	2	473–486	
38	June 11, 2019	2	487–500	

==== Region 2 (UK) ====
===== Box sets =====
Volume	Date	Discs	Episodes	Ref.
1	June 14, 2010	2	1–13	
2	August 9, 2010	2	14–26	
3	October 10, 2010	2	27–39	
4	December 27, 2010	2	40–52	
5	May 16, 2011	2	53–65	
6	July 11, 2011	2	66–77	
7	November 7, 2011	2	78–88	
8	February 24, 2012	2	89–100	
9	June 4, 2012	2	101–112	
10	September 10, 2012	2	113–126	
11	November 26, 2012	2	127–140	
12	March 18, 2013	2	141–153	
13	June 24, 2013	2	154–166	
14	September 23, 2013	2	167–179	
15	December 9, 2013	2	180–192	
16	February 24, 2014	2	193–205	
17	April 7, 2014	2	206–218	
18	July 21, 2014	2	219–231	
19	October 13, 2014	2	232–244	
20	February 9, 2015	2	245–257	
21	August 10, 2015	2	258–270	
22	September 14, 2015	2	271–283	
23	February 8, 2016	2	284–296	
24	April 4, 2016	2	297–309	
25	August 15, 2016	2	310–322	
26	October 17, 2016	2	323–335	
27	February 6, 2017	2	336–348	
28	May 15, 2017	2	349–361	
29	July 24, 2017	2	362–374	
30	November 27, 2017	2	375–387	
31	February 26, 2018	2	388–401	
32	May 21, 2018	2	402–415	
33	August 20, 2018	2	416–430	
34	November 19, 2018	2	431–444	
35	February 11, 2019	2	445–458	
36	April 29, 2019	2	459–472	
37	July 15, 2019	2	473–486	
38	October 7, 2019	2	487–500	

===== Series sets =====
Volume	Date	Discs	Episodes	Ref.
1	March 7, 2011	8	1–52	
2	June 4, 2012	8	53–100	
3	June 3, 2013	8	101–153	
4	February 10, 2014	8	154–192	
5	April 13, 2015	8	193–244	
6	April 4, 2016	8	245–296	
7	September 4, 2017	8	297–348	
8	April 23, 2018	8	349–401	
9	March 25, 2019	8	402–458	
10	December 9, 2019	6	459–500	

==== Region 3 (Japan) ====
The Chapter of Kazekage Rescue
Volume	Date	Discs	Episodes	Ref.
1	August 1, 2007	1	1–4	
2	September 5, 2007	1	5–8	
3	October 3, 2007	1	9–12	
4	November 7, 2007	1	13–16	
5	December 5, 2007	1	17–20	
6	January 1, 2008	1	21–24	
7	February 6, 2008	1	25–28	
8	March 5, 2008	1	29–32	

The Chapter of Long-Awaited Reunion
Volume	Date	Discs	Episodes	Ref.
1	April 2, 2008	1	33–36	
2	May 9, 2008	1	37–40	
3	June 4, 2008	1	41–44	
4	July 2, 2008	1	45–48	
5	August 6, 2008	1	49–53	

The Chapter of Twelve Guardian Ninja
Volume	Date	Discs	Episodes	Ref.
1	September 3, 2008	1	54–57	
2	October 1, 2008	1	58–61	
3	November 5, 2008	1	62–66	
4	December 3, 2008	1	67–71	

The Chapter of Immortal Devastators -Hidan and Kakuzu-
Volume	Date	Discs	Episodes	Ref.
1	January 14, 2009	1	72–75	
2	February 4, 2009	1	76–79	
3	March 4, 2009	1	80–83	
4	May 13, 2009	1	84–88	

The Chapter of the Three-Tailed Demon Turtle
Volume	Date	Discs	Episodes	Ref.
1	June 3, 2009	1	89–92	
2	July 1, 2009	1	93–96	
3	August 5, 2009	1	97–100	
4	September 2, 2009	1	101–104	
5	October 7, 2009	1	105–108	
6	November 4, 2009	1	109–112	

Kakashi Gaiden -The Boys' Life in a Battlefield-
Volume	Date	Discs	Episodes	Ref.
1	December 16, 2009	1	119–120	

The Chapter of Master's Prophecy and Vengeance
Volume	Date	Discs	Episodes	Ref.
1	January 13, 2010	1	113–116	
2	February 3, 2010	1	117–118, 121–122	
3	March 3, 2010	1	123–126	
4	April 7, 2010	1	127–130	
5	May 12, 2010	1	131–134	
6	June 2, 2010	1	135–138	
7	July 7, 2010	1	139–143	

The Chapter of the Six-Tailed Demon Slug
Volume	Date	Discs	Episodes	Ref.
1	August 4, 2010	1	144–147	
2	September 1, 2010	1	148–151	

The Chapter of Two Saviors
Volume	Date	Discs	Episodes	Ref.
1	October 6, 2010	1	152–155	
2	November 3, 2010	1	156–159	
3	December 1, 2010	1	160–163	
4	January 12, 2011	1	164–167	
5	February 2, 2011	1	168–169, 172–173	
6	March 2, 2011	1	174–175, 170–171	

The Past -The History of Konoha-
Volume	Date	Discs	Episodes	Ref.
1	April 6, 2011	1	176–179	
2	May 11, 2011	1	180–183	
3	June 1, 2011	1	184–186, 189	
4	July 6, 2011	1	190–193	
5	August 3, 2011	1	194–196, 187-188	

The Chapter of Gokage League
Volume	Date	Discs	Episodes	Ref.
1	September 7, 2011	1	197–200	
2	October 5, 2011	1	201–204	
3	November 2, 2011	1	205–208	
4	December 7, 2011	1	209–212	
5	January 11, 2012	1	213–216	
6	February 1, 2012	1	217–221	

Paradise on the Ship
Volume	Date	Discs	Episodes	Ref.
1	March 7, 2012	1	222–225	
2	April 4, 2012	1	226–229	
3	May 2, 2012	1	230–233	
4	June 6, 2012	1	234–237	
5	July 4, 2012	1	238–242	

Special Edition -The Birth of Naruto-
Volume	Date	Discs	Episodes	Ref.
1	August 1, 2012	1	248–249	

Special Edition -The Fated Two-
Volume	Date	Discs	Episodes	Ref.
1	September 5, 2012	1	257–260	

The Chapter of Nine-Tailed Fox Taming and Karmic Encounters
Volume	Date	Discs	Episodes	Ref.
1	October 3, 2012	1	243–247	
2	November 7, 2012	1	250–253	
3	December 5, 2012	1	254–256, 261	
4	January 9, 2013	1	262–265	
5	February 6, 2013	1	266–270	
6	March 6, 2013	1	271–275	

The Chapter of the Seven Shinobi Swordsmen
Volume	Date	Discs	Episodes	Ref.
1	April 3, 2013	1	276–280	
2	May 1, 2013	1	281–284	
3	June 5, 2013	1	285–289	

Chikara
Volume	Date	Discs	Episodes	Ref.
Black	July 3, 2013	1	290–292	
White	August 7, 2013	1	293–295	

The Fourth Great Ninja War -Assailants From Afar
Volume	Date	Discs	Episodes	Ref.
1	September 4, 2013	1	296–299	
2	October 2, 2013	1	300–303	
3	November 6, 2013	1	304–307	
4	December 4, 2013	1	308–311	
5	January 8, 2014	1	312–315	
6	February 5, 2014	1	316–320	

The Fourth Great Ninja War -Sasuke & Itachi
Volume	Date	Discs	Episodes	Ref.
1	March 4, 2014	1	321–324	
2	April 2, 2014	1	325–328	
3	May 7, 2014	1	329–332	
4	July 2, 2014	1	333–336	
5	July 2, 2014	1	337–340	
6	August 6, 2014	1	341–344	
7	September 3, 2014	1	345–348	

Kakashi: Shadow of the ANBU Black Ops
Volume	Date	Discs	Episodes	Ref.
1	October 1, 2014	1	349–352	
2	November 5, 2014	1	353–356	
3	December 3, 2014	1	357–361	

The Fourth Great Ninja War "The Return of Squad Seven"
Volume	Date	Discs	Episodes	Ref.
1	January 7, 2015	1	362–365	
2	February 4, 2015	1	366–369	
3	March 4, 2015	1	370–372, 376–377	

The Fourth Great Ninja War -Obito Uchiha
Volume	Date	Discs	Episodes	Ref.
1	April 1, 2015	1	373–375, 378	
2	May 13, 2015	1	379–382	
3	June 3, 2015	1	383–386	
4	July 1, 2015	1	387–390	
5	August 5, 2015	1	391–393	

In Naruto's Footsteps -The Path Traveled-
Volume	Date	Discs	Episodes	Ref.
1	September 2, 2015	1	394–397	
2	October 7, 2015	1	398–401	
3	November 4, 2015	1	402–405	
4	December 2, 2015	1	406–409	
5	January 6, 2016	1	410–413	

Infinite Tsukuyomi: The Invocation
Volume	Date	Discs	Episodes	Ref.
1	February 3, 2016	1	414–417	
2	March 2, 2016	1	418–421	
3	April 6, 2016	1	422–426	
4	May 11, 2016	1	427–431	

Jiraiya Ninja Scrolls: The Tale of Naruto the Hero
Volume	Date	Discs	Episodes	Ref.
1	June 8, 2016	1	432–435	
2	July 6, 2016	1	436–439	
3	August 3, 2016	1	440–443	
4	September 7, 2016	1	444–447	
5	October 5, 2016	1	448–450	

Itachi's Story - Light and Darkness
Volume	Date	Discs	Episodes	Ref.
1	November 2, 2016	1	451–454	
2	December 7, 2016	1	455–458	

The Origins of Ninshu ~ The Two Souls, Indra and Ashura
Volume	Date	Discs	Episodes	Ref.
1	January 11, 2017	1	459–462	
2	February 8, 2017	1	463–466	
3	March 1, 2017	1	467–469	

The Chapter of Naruto and Sasuke
Volume	Date	Discs	Episodes	Ref.
1	April 5, 2017	1	470–473	
2	May 10, 2017	1	474–477	
3	June 7, 2017	1	478–479	

Nostalgic Days
Volume	Date	Discs	Episodes	Ref.
1	July 5, 2017	1	480–483	

Sasuke Shinden
Volume	Date	Discs	Episodes	Ref.
1	August 2, 2017	1	484–488	

Shikamaru Hiden
Volume	Date	Discs	Episodes	Ref.
1	September 6, 2017	1	489–493	

Konoha Hiden
Volume	Date	Discs	Episodes	Ref.
1	October 4, 2017	1	494–496	
2	November 1, 2017	1	497–500	

==== Region 4 (Australia/NZ) ====
Collection	Date	Discs	Episodes	Ref.
1	March 17, 2010	2	1–13	
2	June 16, 2010	2	14–26	
3	September 1, 2010	2	27–39	
4	November 3, 2010	2	40–52	
5	February 16, 2011	2	53–65	
6	July 20, 2011	2	66–77	
7	November 16, 2011	2	78–88	
8	February 15, 2012	2	89–100	
9	May 23, 2012	2	101–112	
10	July 4, 2012	2	113–126	
11	October 24, 2012	2	127–140	
12	January 9, 2013	2	141–153	
13	March 20, 2013	2	154–166	
14	June 19, 2013	2	167–179	
15	October 16, 2013	2	180–192	
16	February 19, 2014	2	193–205	
17	March 19, 2014	2	206–218	
18	June 18, 2014	2	219–231	
19	August 20, 2014	2	232–244	
20	January 7, 2015	2	245–257	
21	March 11, 2015	2	258–270	
22	June 10, 2015	2	271–283	
23	September 16, 2015	2	284–296	
24	January 13, 2016	2	297–309	
25	April 6, 2016	2	310–322	
26	September 7, 2016	2	323–335	
27	October 5, 2016	2	336–348	
28	December 7, 2016	2	349–361	
29	March 8, 2017	2	362–374	
30	June 7, 2017	2	375–387	
31	September 6, 2017	2	388–401	
32	December 6, 2017	2	402–415	
33	March 7, 2018	2	416–430	
34	July 4, 2018	2	431–444	
35	November 1, 2018	2	445–458	
36	March 6, 2019	2	459–472	
37	June 5, 2019	2	473–486	
38	August 7, 2019	2	487–500	

===== Hokage Box Sets =====
Box Set	Date	Discs	Episodes	Ref.
1	May 24, 2017	16	1–100	
2	May 24, 2017	16	101–205	
3	February 21, 2018	16	206–309	
4	November 1, 2018	16	310–415	
5	December 4, 2019	12	416–500	

===== Chakra Collection =====
Collection	Date	Discs	Episodes	Ref.
1	March 4, 2020	11	1–71	
2	April 15, 2020	11	72–140	
3	May 27, 2020	11	141–212	
4	June 17, 2020	11	213–283	
5	July 8, 2020	11	284–355	
6	August 5, 2020	11	356–430	
7	September 2, 2020	10	431–500	

=== Blu-ray ===
==== Region A (North America) ====
Only volumes 1, 3, 5 and 7 will consist of 27 episodes. The other 14 volumes will consist of 28, to ensure all 500 episodes fit properly.

Viz Media
Set	Date	Discs	Episodes	Ref.
1	October 17, 2023	4	1–27	
2	January 30, 2024	4	28–55	
3	May 14, 2024	4	56–82	
4	September 10, 2024	4	83–110	
5	January 14, 2025	4	111–137	
6	April 29, 2025	4	138–165	
7	July 15, 2025	4	166–192	
8	October 28, 2025	4	193–220	
9	January 26, 2026	4	221–248	
10	May 19, 2026	4	249–276	
11	August 11, 2026	4	277–304	
12	November 17, 2026	4	305–332	

==== Region B (UK) ====
All The Anime
Volume	Date	Discs	Episodes	Ref.
1	February 26, 2026	4	1–25	
2	March 30, 2026	4	26–50	
3	April 27, 2026	4	51–75	
4	May 25, 2026	4	76–100	
5	July 13, 2026	4	101–125	
6	August 24, 2026	4	126–150	
7	November 9, 2026	4	151–175	
