= 2001 in animation =

2001 in animation is an overview of notable events, including notable awards, list of films released, television show debuts and endings, and notable deaths.

== Events ==
=== January ===
- January 1: The first episode of Horrible Histories airs, which features occasional animated sequences.
- January 12: The first episode of Lizzie McGuire airs.
- January 13: The first episode of House of Mouse airs.
- January 23: Richard Linklater's Waking Life premieres.

=== February ===
- February 2: John Callahan's Quads!, based on John Callahan's cartoons, is first broadcast.
- February 3: The first episode of Lloyd in Space airs.
- February 4: The Futurama episode "Amazon Women in the Mood" premieres, guest starring actress and comedian Bea Arthur.
- February 11:
  - The Futurama episode "Bendless Love" premieres, guest starring actress and comedian Jan Hooks.
  - The Simpsons episode "Tennis the Menace" premieres, guest starring Andre Agassi, Pete Sampras, Venus Williams, and Serena Williams.
- February 16: The film Recess: School's Out is released.
- February 23: Henry Selick's Monkeybone, which combines animation with live-action, is released, but to bad reviews and low audience attendances.
- February 25: The Futurama episode "That's Lobstertainment!" premieres, guest starring actor, comedian and fellow Simpsons cast member Hank Azaria. However, this episode received polarizing reception from fans and it was often regarded as one of the worst episodes of the series.

=== March ===
- March 3: The SpongeBob SquarePants episode "Mermaid Man and Barnacle Boy II" premieres on Nickelodeon, thus concluding the first season of the show.
- March 25: 73rd Academy Awards: Father and Daughter by Michaël Dudok de Wit wins the Academy Award for Best Animated Short Film.
- March 30:
  - The first episode of The Fairly OddParents airs.
  - The first episode of Invader Zim airs. It became a cult classic and adult interest years later.

=== April ===
- April 1:
  - The Futurama episode "The Cyber House Rules" premieres, in which Leela meets up with her former orphanarium playmate Adlai Atkins, now a plastic surgeon, who agrees to grant Leela surgery that will give her two eyes.
  - The Simpsons episode "Simpson Safari" is broadcast, in which the family travels to Africa.
- April 4: The first episode of Titeuf airs, based on the eponymous comics series.
- April 8: The Tom and Jerry short The Mansion Cat, produced by Hanna-Barbera, premieres on Cartoon Network's sister network Boomerang. This was the final Tom and Jerry-related piece of media to be produced by Hanna-Barbera before the studio's closure this year, it is also the last Tom and Jerry-related piece of media to be produced with the franchise's co-creator William Hanna still being around (who died two weeks before this short premiered).
- April 19: Bill Plympton's Mutant Aliens is released.
- April 20: The dark Invader Zim episode "Dark Harvest" airs. This episode became controversial when it was mentioned at the Scott Dyleski trial in 2006.
- April 22: The Futurama episode "Bendin' in the Wind" premieres, guest starring musician Beck.
- April 29: The Simpsons episode "Trilogy of Error" is first broadcast, in which three connected stories from different viewpoints are told, inspired by the film Run Lola Run, all based around Homer Simpson accidentally cutting off his thumb. The episode also guest stars Malcolm in the Middle star Frankie Muniz as Thelonious.

=== May ===
- May 13:
  - The Futurama episode "I Dated a Robot" premieres on Fox, guest starring actress Lucy Liu. The episode was seen by over 6 million viewers that night.
  - King of the Hill concludes its fifth season on Fox with the episode "Kidney Boy and Hamster Girl: A Love Story", which was seen by over 8.1 million viewers that night.
- May 18: The film Shrek premieres and becomes an unexpected box office hit.
- May 20: The Simpsons concludes its 12th season on Fox with the episode "Simpsons Tall Tales", which was seen by over 13.4 million viewers that night.
- May 26: Rintaro's Metropolis is first released, based on Osamu Tezuka's Metropolis.

=== June ===
- June 2: The first episode of Braceface is broadcast.
- June 3: Gary Trousdale and Kirk Wise's Atlantis: The Lost Empire, produced by the Walt Disney Company, is released. It is a box office flop, but becomes a cult film later. During its 25-week theatrical run, Atlantis: The Lost Empire grossed over $186 million worldwide ($84 million from the United States and Canada). Responding to its disappointing box-office performance, Thomas Schumacher, then-president of Walt Disney Feature Animation, said, "It seemed like a good idea at the time to not do a sweet fairy tale, but we missed."
- June 8: The first episode of Time Squad airs.
- June 20: Season 5 of South Park begins on Comedy Central with the premiere of the episode "It Hits the Fan", which is well known for having the word "sh*t" said uncensored on television. This was the first episode to premiere in the 21st century.
- June 27: The South Park episode "Cripple Fight" premieres on Comedy Central, featuring the debut of Jimmy Valmer.
- June 28: The Rugrats receive a star at the Hollywood Walk of Fame.
- June 30: The first episode of What's with Andy? is broadcast.

=== July ===
- July 11: Season 3 of Family Guy begins on Fox with the premiere of the episode "The Thin White Line", which was seen by just nearly 6 million viewers that night.
- July 20:
  - The Portuguese film The Happy Cricket is released.
  - Hayao Miyazaki's Spirited Away premieres.
- July 21: The hour-long Rugrats special "All Growed Up" premieres on Nickelodeon in honor of the show's 10th anniversary.
  - The special serves as the backdoor pilot for the spin-off All Grown Up!, which premiered 2 years later on Nick.
  - This special holds the record for the most watched program on Nickelodeon at its premiere, ranking in a total of over 11 million viewers.

=== August ===
- August 7: Osmosis Jones is first released.
- August 8: The South Park episode "Towelie" premieres on Comedy Central, featuring the debut of Towelie.
- August 10: The first episode of Samurai Jack premieres on Cartoon Network.
- August 24: The first episodes of Grim & Evil premiere on Cartoon Network.

=== September ===
- September 2: The adult-oriented block Adult Swim is launched and debuts on Cartoon Network. The first episodes of two long-running series air the same day: Harvey Birdman, Attorney at Law and Sealab 2021.
- September 3: The first episode of The Legend of Tarzan, produced by the Walt Disney Company, is broadcast.
- September 7: The SpongeBob SquarePants episode "Band Geeks", premieres on Nickelodeon, gaining generally positive attention by both fans & critics.
- September 9: The first official episode of Aqua Teen Hunger Force airs, almost over a year after airing the pilot episode.
- September 14: The film The House of Morecock is released, the first gay pornographic adult animated feature film. It is directed by comics artist Joe Phillips.
- September 15:
  - The first episode of Stanley is broadcast.
  - The first episode of The Proud Family is broadcast, produced by the Walt Disney Company.
- September 24: The sixth season of Arthur airs as Justin Bradley would take over Michael Yarmush's role as the titular character due to voice changing by adult age. Unfortunately, Bradley failed to repeat this due to regarding his input to be too deep for Arthur as Mark Rendall re-dubbed over Bradley's lines the next year and is chosen to be the next voice for the character.
- Specific date unknown: Hanna-Barbera is absorbed into Warner Bros. Animation. due to the death of animator William Hannah in March this year.

=== October ===
- October 5:
  - Season 3 of SpongeBob SquarePants begins on Nickelodeon with the premiere of the episodes "Just One Bite/The Bully".
  - "Just One Bite" originally showed the famous boobytrap scenes with gas and fire before Nickelodeon removed it the following year.
- October 9: Scooby-Doo and the Cyber Chase is released. The reviews were mixed as a result that it was not a best-seller like Zombie Island and Alien Invaders.
- October 14: The first episode of 2DTV is broadcast, which ridicules celebrities.
- October 20: The first episode of Mary-Kate and Ashley in Action! airs, an animated version of TV actresses Mary-Kate and Ashley Olsen (voicing themselves) which is cancelled after only one season.
- October 25: The film The Abrafaxe – Under The Black Flag is released, based on Lona Rietschel and Lothar Dräger's comic strip Die Abrafaxe.
- October 28: The film Monsters, Inc. by Pixar and the Walt Disney Company is released.

=== November ===
- November 3: The first episode of Totally Spies! airs.
- November 5: The final episode of Recess airs. It was supposed to end after the fifth season, but ratings gave the show one more season, which only lasted for 3 half-hours due to the show passing the 65-episode rule.
- November 6: Season 13 of The Simpsons begins on Fox with the premiere of the latest Treehouse of Horror installment "Treehouse of Horror XII". It was seen by over 13 million viewers that night.
- November 7: The South Park episode "Osama bin Laden Has Farty Pants" first airs, famous for referencing the September 11 attacks and ridiculing Osama bin Laden in the style of World War II propaganda cartoons.
- November 11: Season 6 of King of the Hill begins on Fox with the premiere of the episode "Bobby Goes Nuts", which was the first to be produced entirely in digital ink and paint; but the show would continue to be produced in Cel Animation from up until the eighth season.
- November 17: The first episode of Justice League is broadcast.
- November 18:
  - Dexter's Laboratory revives as Chris Savino took over as series director instead of Genndy Tartakovsky, who moved on to produce the new show Samurai Jack. Unlike the original episodes as the show gained popularity in the 1990s, the new batch was unsuccessful as the popularity of Dexter's Laboratory falls.
  - The Simpsons episode "Homer the Moe" premieres, guest starring the rock band R.E.M.
- November 22: Episodes 1 through 14 of Happy Tree Friends as a TV-special premieres on MTV for first time, marking the TV debut of Volume 1 - First Blood.

=== December ===
- December 5: The South Park episode "Kenny Dies" premieres on Comedy Central, in which Kenny McCormick falls victim of a terminal illness, while Eric Cartman goes to find a way to lift the ban on stem cell research. The episode ends with Kenny getting "killed off", disappearing entirely from Season 6 before returning right at the end of the final episode of said season, Red Sleigh Down.
- December 9:
  - The Futurama episode "Roswell that Ends Well" premieres, in which the Planet Express crew accidentally time traveled back to July 1947 and caused the Roswell incident. This episode received critical acclaim and the series won its first Emmy Award for Outstanding Animated Program (Programming Less Than One Hour) in 2002.
  - The film Jimmy Neutron: Boy Genius is released.
- December 12: South Park concludes its fifth season on Comedy Central with the episode "Butters' Very Own Episode". This episode was written to get fans more acquainted with Butters Stotch as he would be taking Kenny's spot as the 4th friend in the group starting next season.
- December 15: The Hong Kong film My Life as McDull is released.
- December 16: The Simpsons episode "She of Little Faith" premieres, in which Lisa Simpson becomes a Buddhist; it also guest stars Richard Gere.
- December 18: The Tell-Tale Heart is added to the National Film Registry.
- December 21: The film Momo alla conquista del tempo, an adaptation of Michael Ende's Momo is first released.
- December 23:
  - The first episode of Cédric, an animated series based on the comics series Cédric airs.
  - The Futurama episode "A Tale of Two Santas" premieres, guest starring rapper Coolio as Kwanzaabot. This was the first episode that John DiMaggio took over the role as Robot Santa due to John Goodman (his original voice actor in "Xmas Story") not being available to reprise.
- Specific Date Unknown: French/Belgium/Luxembourgish animation studio Neuroplanet liquidates. Leaving 80 people unemployed.

=== Specific date unknown ===
- The film The Jar: A Tale from the East is released.
- Boomerang cease airing Fantastic Four due to complications with Hanna-Barbera and Disney when Disney's ownership acquired Fox Kids Worldwide that has full rights to Marvel content as Time Warner ended distribution rights to Fantastic Four, prior to Disney's purchase with Marvel Comics in 2009. The series remains in obscurity after the 34 year broadcast.

== Awards ==
- Academy Award for Best Animated Short Film: Father and Daughter
- Animation Kobe Feature Film Award: Spirited Away
- Annecy International Animated Film Festival Cristal du long métrage: Mutant Aliens
- Annie Award for Best Animated Feature: Shrek
- César Award for Best Foreign Film: Spirited Away
- Golden Bear: Spirited Away
- Goya Award for Best Animated Film: El bosque animado
- Japan Media Arts Festival Animation Award: Spirited Away and Millennium Actress
- Mainichi Film Awards - Animation Grand Award: Spirited Away
- Mainichi Film Award for Best Film: Spirited Away
- Japan Academy Prize for Picture of the Year: Spirited Away

== Films released ==
- January 13 - Initial D: Third Stage (Japan)
- January 20 - Shenmue: The Movie (Japan)
- January 24 - Mutant Aliens (United States)
- February 16 - Recess: School's Out (United States)
- February 23 - Monkeybone (United States)
- February 27 - Lady and the Tramp II: Scamp's Adventure (United States)
- March 3 - One Piece: Clockwork Island Adventure (Japan)
- March 10 - Doraemon: Nobita and the Winged Braves (Japan)
- March 24 - VeggieTales: Lyle the Kindly Viking (United States)
- April 21:
  - Crayon Shin-chan: The Adult Empire Strikes Back (Japan)
  - Detective Conan: Countdown to Heaven (Japan)
- April 27 - Malice@Doll (Japan)
- May 11 - The Trumpet of the Swan (United States)
- May 18 - Shrek (United States)
- May 26 - Metropolis (Japan)
- May 30 - Little Potam (France)
- June 15 - Atlantis: The Lost Empire (United States)
- July 7 - Pokémon 4Ever (Japan)
- July 11 - Final Fantasy: The Spirits Within (Japan and United States)
- July 20:
  - The Happy Cricket (Brazil)
  - Spirited Away (Japan)
- August 3 - The Living Forest (Spain)
- August 7 - The Little Bear Movie (Canada)
- August 10 - Osmosis Jones (United States)
- August 17 - 10 + 2: The Great Secret (Spain)
- August 22 - Blue Remains (Japan)
- September 1 - Cowboy Bebop: The Movie (Japan)
- September 14:
  - The House of Morecock (United States)
  - Millennium Actress (Japan)
- September 15:
  - Christmas Carol: The Movie (United Kingdom and Germany)
  - VeggieTales: The Ultimate Silly Song Countdown (United States)
- September 20 - Commando Stoertebeker (Germany)
- October 2 - Barbie in the Nutcracker (Canada and United States)
- October 4 - The Little Polar Bear (Germany)
- October 9 - Scooby-Doo and the Cyber Chase (United States)
- October 12 - Mr. Blot's Triumph (Poland)
- October 19 - Waking Life (United States)
- October 25:
  - The Abrafaxe – Under The Black Flag (Germany) (produced in 2000)
  - Putih (Malaysia)
- October 30:
  - The Kid (Canada and United States)
  - Rudolph the Red-Nosed Reindeer and the Island of Misfit Toys (Canada)
- November 2 - Monsters, Inc. (United States)
- November 6:
  - Franklin's Magic Christmas (Canada)
  - Mickey's Magical Christmas: Snowed in at the House of Mouse (United States)
  - Recess Christmas: Miracle on Third Street (United States)
- November 29 - Ladybirds' Christmas (Estonia)
- December 4 - The Land Before Time VIII: The Big Freeze (United States)
- December 12 - Becassine and the Viking Treasure (France)
- December 13 - The Santa Claus Brothers (Canada and United States)
- December 15:
  - Hamtaro: Adventures in Ham-Ham Land (Japan)
  - InuYasha the Movie: Affections Touching Across Time (Japan)
  - My Life as McDull (Hong Kong)
- December 21:
  - Aida of the Trees (Italy and United Kingdom)
  - Jimmy Neutron: Boy Genius (United States)
  - La leyenda del unicornio (Spain)
  - Momo (Italy and Germany)
  - Sakura Wars: The Movie (Japan)
- December 22 - Marco Polo: Return to Xanadu (United States) (produced in 1999)
- December 31 - Fünf Wochen im Ballon (China and Germany)
- Specific date unknown:
  - Fracasse (Spain and France)
  - Hay – The Gazelle Child (Arab League)
  - The Jar: A Tale from the East (Syria)
  - The Vœu (France)

== Television series debuts ==
Date	Title	Channel	Year
January 12	Gary & Mike	UPN	2001
January 13	House of Mouse	ABC/Toon Disney	2001–2003
January 27	The Zeta Project	Kids' WB	2001–2002
February 3	Lloyd in Space	ABC/Toon Disney	2001–2004
February 11	Animated Tales of the World	HBO Family	2001–2003
March 30	The Fairly OddParents	Nickelodeon	2001–2017
March 30	Invader Zim	Nickelodeon	2001–2002
April 1	The Oblongs	The WB	2001–2002
April 1	Undergrads	MTV (US); The Detour on Teletoon (Canada)	2001
April 2	The Big O	Cartoon Network	2001–2003
June 2	Braceface	Fox Family	2001–2004
June 3	Baby Looney Tunes	Kids' WB/Cartoon Network	2001–2006
June 8	Time Squad	Cartoon Network	2001–2003
June 10	Tiny Planets	Noggin	2001–2002
August 10	Samurai Jack	Cartoon Network	2001–2004
August 11	Cubix: Robots for Everyone	Kids' WB (U.S.)	2001–2004
August 18	Pokémon: Johto League Champions	Kids' WB (U.S.)	2001–2002
August 20	Oswald	Nick Jr.	2001–2003
August 24	Grim & Evil	Cartoon Network	2001–2002
September 1	The Legend of Tarzan	UPN/ABC	2001–2003
September 2	Space Ghost Coast to Coast	Adult Swim	2001–2004
September 2	Anne of Green Gables: The Animated Series	PBS Kids	2001–2002
September 3	Sagwa, the Chinese Siamese Cat	PBS Kids	2001–2002
September 8	Medabots	Fox Kids/Jetix (U.S.)	2001–2004
September 8	Transformers: Robots in Disguise	Fox Kids (U.S.)	2001–2002
September 10	The URL with Phred Show	Noggin	2001–2002
September 13	Sitting Ducks	Cartoon Network	2001–2004
September 15	Alienators: Evolution Continues	Fox Kids	2001–2002
September 15	The Ripping Friends	Fox Kids	2001–2002
September 15	The Proud Family	Disney Channel	2001–2005
September 15	Stanley	Playhouse Disney	2001–2004
September 22	What's with Andy?	Fox Family (U.S.); Teletoon (Canada)	2001–2007
September 29	The Mummy	Kids' WB	2001–2003
September 29	Yu-Gi-Oh! Duel Monsters	Kids' WB	2001–2006
October 20	Mary-Kate and Ashley in Action!	ABC	2001–2002
October 24	Timber Wolf	WB Online	2001–2002
November 3	Totally Spies!	Cartoon Network (U.S.)	2001–2010
November 17	Justice League	Cartoon Network (U.S.)	2001–2004
November 19	The Popeye Show	Cartoon Network (U.S.)	2001–2003

== Television series endings ==
Date	Title	Channel	Year	Notes
January 13	Buzz Lightyear of Star Command	ABC, UPN	2000–2001	Cancelled
January 24	TV Funhouse	Comedy Central	2000–2001	Cancelled
February 28	The New Adventures of Madeline	Playhouse Disney	2000–2001	Ended
March 11	The Bob Clampett Show	Cartoon Network	2000–2001	Ended
March 21	Generation O!	Kids' WB	2000–2001	Cancelled
March 21	Oh Yeah! Cartoons	Nickelodeon	1998–2001	Cancelled
March 31	Spider-Man Unlimited	Fox Kids	1999–2001	Cancelled
April 13	Gary & Mike	UPN	2001	Cancelled
May 27	Mike, Lu & Og	Cartoon Network	1999–2001	Cancelled
June 7	Zoboomafoo	PBS Kids	1999–2001	Ended
June 11	The Angry Beavers	Nickelodeon	1997–2001	Ended
June 30	Men in Black: The Series	Kids' WB	1997–2001	Ended
August 11	Pokémon: The Johto Journeys	Kids' WB	2000–2001	Ended
August 12	Undergrads	MTV	2001	Cancelled
August 20	Action Man	Fox Kids	2000–2001	Ended
September 9	Phred on Your Head Show	Noggin	1999–2001	Ended
November 5	Recess	ABC	1997–2001	Cancelled
November 22	Maisy	Nickelodeon	1999–2001	Cancelled
November 29	Angela Anaconda	Fox Family	1999–2001	Cancelled
November 30	ReBoot	Cartoon Network	2001	Cancelled
November 30	Pepper Ann	ABC, UPN, Toon Disney	1997-2001	Ended
December 16	Rex the Runt	BBC Two	1998–2001	Ended
December 18	Batman Beyond	The WB	1999–2001	Cancelled
December 23	Fetch the Vet	ITV (CITV)	2000-2001	Ended
December 28	Timothy Goes to School	PBS Kids	2000-2001	Ended
Specific date unknown	JBVO	Cartoon Network	2000-2001	Cancelled

== Television season premieres ==
Date	Title	Season	Channel
January 21	Futurama	3	Fox
March 6	Blue's Clues	4	Nickelodeon
April 6	Ed, Edd n Eddy	3	Cartoon Network
April 20	The Powerpuff Girls	4	Cartoon Network
June 20	South Park	5	Comedy Central
July 11	Family Guy	3	Fox
October 5	SpongeBob SquarePants	3	Nickelodeon
November 6	The Simpsons	13	Fox
November 11	King of the Hill	6	Fox
November 16	Courage the Cowardly Dog	3	Cartoon Network
November 18	Dexter's Laboratory	3 (Note: Despite the show originally ending with the TV movie Ego Trip (1999), it was renewed for two extra seasons earlier in February this year.)	Cartoon Network

== Television season finales ==
Date	Title	Season	Channel
March 3	SpongeBob SquarePants	1	Nickelodeon
May 18	CatDog	3	Nickelodeon
May 13	King of the Hill	5	Fox
May 20	The Simpsons	12	Fox
July 20	Rugrats	6	Nickelodeon
October 12	The Powerpuff Girls	3	Cartoon Network
December 2	Time Squad	1	Cartoon Network
December 3	Samurai Jack	1	Cartoon Network
December 9	The Fairly OddParents	1	Nickelodeon
December 11	Rugrats	7	Nickelodeon
December 12	South Park	5	Comedy Central

== Births ==
=== February ===
- February 15: Haley Tju, American actress (voice of Lexi Kubota in Glitch Techs, Marcy Wu in Amphibia, Alia in Arlo the Alligator Boy and I Heart Arlo, Sqweep in Monsters vs. Aliens, Stella in The Loud House, Karmi in Big Hero 6: The Series, Nu Hai in Kung Fu Panda: The Paws of Destiny, Wenda in Where's Waldo?).
- February 21: Isabella Acres, American actress (voice of Jade in Sofia the First, Mary Anne Gleardan in Scooby-Doo! Mystery Incorporated, Kate in Phineas and Ferb, young Princess Bubblegum in Adventure Time, Emma Gale in Scooby-Doo! Stage Fright).

=== April ===
- April 8: Kyla Rae Kowalewski, American actress (voice of Anais Watterson in The Amazing World of Gumball, and Me-Mow in Adventure Time).
- April 20: Ian Alexander, American actor (voice of Tai in Moon Girl and Devil Dinosaur).

=== May ===
- May 3: Rachel Zegler, American actress and singer (voice of Princess Ellian in Spellbound).

=== June ===
- June 9: Xolo Maridueña, American actor (voice of Andres in Victor and Valentino, Zaid in Cleopatra in Space, Snowy the Snowcrawler in Batwheels, Kid Kree in Moon Girl and Devil Dinosaur, Brainy Smurf in Smurfs).

=== July ===
- July 3: Avalon Robbins, American model and actress (voice of Millie Mouse and Melody Mouse in the Mickey Mouse Clubhouse episode "Minnie's Winter Bow Show", Minnie's Bow-Toons and Mickey and the Roadster Racers, Harper in the Special Agent Oso episode "Goldscooter").
- July 10: Isabela Merced, American actress (voice of Lucky Prescott in Spirit Untamed, Kate in Dora and Friends: Into the City!, Widow Queen in Maya and the Three, Heather in The Nut Job 2: Nutty by Nature, Kim in Migration).

=== August ===
- August 5: Josie Totah, American actress (voice of Jin in Sofia the First, Natalie in Big Mouth and Human Resources).

=== September ===
- September 4: Tenzing Norgay Trainor, American actor (voice of Jin in Abominable and Abominable and the Invisible City, Bodhi in Night at the Museum: Kahmunrah Rises Again).
- September 12: Kiersten Harris, American actress (Craig of the Creek) (d. 2020)

=== October ===
- October 12: Raymond Ochoa, American actor and singer (voice of Arlo in The Good Dinosaur, young Anakin Skywalker in Robot Chicken: Star Wars Episode III, Noah in the Special Agent Oso episode "The Living Holiday Lights").
- October 13: Caleb McLaughlin, American actor (voice of Ghost in Summer Camp Island, Mo-Slo in The Boys Presents: Diabolical episode "An Animated Short Where Pissed-Off Supes Kill Their Parents", young Gary Goodspeed in the Final Space episode "Chapter 4").
- October 17: Jake Beale, Canadian actor (voice of Mike in Mike the Knight, first voice of Daniel in Daniel Tiger's Neighborhood, continued voice of D.W. Read in Arthur).
- October 19: Art Parkinson, Irish actor (voice of Kubo in Kubo and the Two Strings).
- October 21: Ashley Liao, American actress (voice of Jun Wong in DreamWorks Dragons: The Nine Realms).

=== November ===
- November 12: Hazel Doupe, Irish actress (voice of Melinda in Unicorn: Warriors Eternal).

=== December ===
- December 14: Joshua Rush, American actor (voice of Bunga in The Lion Guard, Waldo in Where's Waldo?).
- December 28: Maitreyi Ramakrishnan, Canadian actress (voice of Priya Mangal in Turning Red, Zipp Storm in My Little Pony: Make Your Mark and My Little Pony: Tell Your Tale).

== Deaths ==
=== January ===
- January 2: Alison de Vere, English animator, background designer (Halas and Batchelor, The Beatles, Yellow Submarine, The Animals of Farthing Wood) and director (The Black Dog, Psyche and Eros), dies at age 73.
- January 25: Sam Singer, American film director and producer (The Adventures of Pow Wow, The Adventures of Paddy the Pelican, Bucky and Pepito), dies at age 89.
- January 28: Don Brodie, American actor and director (voice of Devil Donald in Donald's Better Self, and Barker in Pinocchio), dies at age 96.

=== February ===
- February 8: Ivo Caprino, Norwegian film director and writer (Flaklypa Grand Prix), dies at age 80.
- February 10: Lewis Arquette, American actor (voice of Doctor Onishi in the Streamline Pictures dub of Akira, Jimmy Snuka in Hulk Hogan's Rock 'n' Wrestling, Rex DeForest III in Camp Candy, Bombastic Bobby in the Yo Yogi! episode "Yo, Yogi", Abner Doolittle in the SWAT Kats: The Radical Squadron episode "The Ghost Pilot", Principal Gregory Grumm in Daisy-Head Mayzie, Mr. Cilla in As Told by Ginger), dies at age 65.
- February 17: John Sutherland, American animator (Walt Disney Company), voice actor (voice of young adult Bambi in Bambi) and film producer (Daffy Ditties), dies at age 90.

=== March ===
- March 1: Torsten Bjarre, Swedish animator and comics artist, dies at age 85.
- March 8: Edward Winter, American actor (voice of Dr. Buzz Kutt and Owner in Aaahh!!! Real Monsters, President, Sarge and Guard in The Real Adventures of Jonny Quest, Scientist #1 and other various characters in The Angry Beavers), dies from parkinson's disease at age 63.
- March 9: Richard Stone, American composer (Warner Bros. Animation), dies at age 47.
- March 11: Jim P. Dilworth, American animator, designer, and brother of John R. Dilworth (Courage the Cowardly Dog), dies at age 41.
- March 16: Norma MacMillan, Canadian voice actress (voice of Sweet Polly Purebred in Underdog, continued voice of Gumby, Davey in Davey and Goliath and Casper the Friendly Ghost), dies at age 79.
- March 22: William Hanna, American animator, director, producer, and cartoonist (Tom & Jerry, The Flintstones, Yogi Bear, The Jetsons, Wacky Races, Scooby-Doo), co-founder of Hanna-Barbera, dies at age 90.
- March 25: Larry Lansburgh, American producer, director, and screenwriter (Walt Disney Company), dies at age 89.

=== April ===
- April 3: Ray Osrin, American cartoonist, animator and comics artist, dies at age 72.
- April 15: Joey Ramone, American musician and member of the Ramones (voiced himself in The Simpsons episode "Rosebud"), dies from lymphoma at age 49.

=== May ===
- May 18: Maurice Noble, American film director, writer (Tiny Toon Adventures), production designer and background artist (Walt Disney Animation Studios, Warner Bros. Cartoons, MGM Animation/Visual Arts, DePatie-Freleng Enterprises, Poochini, Timber Wolf), dies at age 90.

=== June ===
- June 1: Hank Ketcham, American comics artist and animator (Walt Disney Company, Walter Lantz), dies at age 81.
- June 15: Hurey, Belgian animator (worked for Belvision) and comics artist, dies at age 63.
- June 19: Lee Mishkin, American animator (Calvin and the Colonel, The New 3 Stooges, The Jackson 5ive, Halloween Is Grinch Night, Yogi's Space Race, Jetsons: The Movie, The Simpsons), storyboard artist (Linus the Lionhearted, Heavy Metal) and director (Is It Always Right to Be Right?, Bionic Six), dies at age 74.
- June 24: Kent Holaday, American animator (Walt Disney Animation Studios, Maxie's World, BraveStarr, Who Framed Roger Rabbit, The New Adventures of Beany and Cecil, Mighty Mouse: The New Adventures) and lip sync artist (DIC Entertainment, The Simpsons, The New Adventures of He-Man, Captain Planet and the Planeteers, The Ren & Stimpy Show, Rocko's Modern Life, Klasky Csupo, The Critic, The Maxx, King of the Hill, Daria, Celebrity Deathmatch, Futurama, Sheep in the Big City, Baby Blues), dies at age 49.
- June 26: Paul Berry, English animator and director (The Sandman, worked for Cosgrove Hall and Henry Selick), dies at age 40.
- June 27:
  - Jack Lemmon, American actor (voice of Frank Ormand in The Simpsons episode "The Twisted World of Marge Simpson"), dies from bladder cancer at age 76.
  - Joan Sims, English actress (voice of Mrs. Cratchit in A Christmas Carol, The Witch in The Thief and the Cobbler), dies at age 71.

=== July ===
- July 4: Perry Kiefer, American animator (HBO Storybook Musicals, Bugs Bunny's Overtures to Disaster, Rugrats, Tiny Toon Adventures, Timon & Pumbaa), storyboard artist (Animaniacs, Rocko's Modern Life, Gargoyles, Teenage Mutant Ninja Turtles, The Tick, Pepper Ann), background artist (Animaniacs), prop designer (Gargoyles), sheet timer (Jungle Cubs) and director (101 Dalmatians: The Series), commits suicide at age 41.
- July 7: Toni Pagot, Italian comics artist, cartoonist and animator (Calimero), dies at age 79.
- July 15: Ted Berman, American animator, film director and screenwriter (Walt Disney Company), dies at age 81.
- July 16: Morris, Belgian comics artist and animation director (Daisy Town, The Ballad of the Daltons), dies at age 77.

=== August ===
- August 4: Lorenzo Music, American actor (voice of Garfield in Garfield and Friends, Tummi Gummi in Adventures of the Gummi Bears, Peter Venkman in The Real Ghostbusters and Ralph the All-Purpose Animal in Twice Upon a Time), dies at age 64.
- August 16: Dave Barry, American radio host and voice actor (voice of Humphrey Bogart in 8 Ball Bunny, Bluto in the Popeye cartoon Seein' Red, White 'N' Blue, Elmer Fudd in Pre-Hysterical Hare), dies at age 82.
- August 23: Kathleen Freeman, American actress (voice of Eugenia Kisskillya in Detention, Mrs. Gordon in As Told by Ginger, Mrs. Crackshell in DuckTales, Elder #1 in FernGully: The Last Rainforest, Ma in the Chip 'n Dale: Rescue Rangers episode "Short Order Crooks", Mrs. Evans in The Real Adventures of Jonny Quest episode "Return of the Anasazi", Greta in the Cow and Chicken episode "Sumo Cow", Ma Mayhem in the Batman Beyond episode "The Eggbaby"), dies from lung cancer at age 78.

=== September ===
- September 7: Billie Lou Watt, American actress and writer (voice of the title characters in Astro Boy and Kimba the White Lion, Jimmy Sparks in Gigantor, Chris Peeper, Gizmo and other various characters in Superbook, Ma Bagge and McPhearson Phantom in Courage the Cowardly Dog), dies from lung cancer at age 77.
- September 18: Ernie Coombs, American-Canadian entertainer (voice of the Narrator in Simon in the Land of Chalk Drawings), dies from a stroke at age 73.
- September 23: Robert Abel, American visual effects artist (Tron), dies at age 64.
- September 30: Bjørn Frank Jensen, Danish animator and comics artist (co-founder of Ring, Frank & Jensen, worked for Marten Toonder's animation department), dies at age 81.

=== October ===
- October 5: Jan Lenica, Polish graphic designer, cartoonist, poster illustrator and animator (Dom, A, Adam 2, Ubu et la grande gidouille), dies at age 73.
- October 6: Yuriy Meshcheryakov, Russian-Ukrainian animator (The Tale of Tsar Saltan), dies at age 55.
- October 9: Vladimir Danilevich, Russian film director (Vaniusha The Newcomer), dies at age 77.

=== November ===
- November 6: Chris Ishii, American animator and comic artist (Walt Disney Animation Studios, UPA, the 1974 Mad Magazine special, the animated segment in Woody Allen's Annie Hall), dies at age 81.
- November 12: Albert Hague, German-American songwriter and composer (How the Grinch Stole Christmas!), dies at age 81.
- November 20: Bob Moore, American animator and comics artist (worked for Walter Lantz and Walt Disney Animation), dies at age 81.
- November 21: Seymour Reit, aka Sy Reit, American animator (Fleischer Studios, co-creator of Casper the Friendly Ghost), writer, screenwriter, comics writer and comics artist, dies at age 83.
- November 29: George Harrison, English musician, singer-songwriter and member of The Beatles (voiced himself in The Simpsons episode "Homer's Barbershop Quartet"), dies from lung cancer at age 58.

=== December ===
- December 2: Chase Craig, American animator, scriptwriter and comics writer (Warner Bros. Cartoons, Walter Lantz Productions), dies at age 91.
- December 7: Faith Hubley, American animator, storyboard artist (Mr. Magoo, co-founder of Storyboard Studios), dies at age 77 from breast cancer.
- December 11: Beverly Hope Atkinson, American actress (voice of Carol in Heavy Traffic), dies at age 66.
- December 26: Nigel Hawthorne, English actor (voice of Captain Campion in Watership Down, Dr. Boycott in The Plague Dogs, Fflewddur Fflam in The Black Cauldron, Professor Porter in Tarzan), dies at age 72.
- December 30: Ray Patterson, American animator and film director and producer (Screen Gems, Walt Disney Animation Studios, MGM Animation, Grantray-Lawrence Animation, Hanna-Barbera), dies at age 90.
- December 31: David Swift, American writer, film director and producer (Walt Disney Company), dies at age 82.

=== Specific date unknown ===
- Todd Halford, American modeler and production assistant (Mainframe Entertainment), dies at an unknown age.

== See also ==
- 2001 in anime

== Sources ==
- Leng, Simon (2006) [2003]. While My Guitar Gently Weeps: The Music of George Harrison. SAF Publishing Ltd. ISBN 978-1-4234-0609-9.
