= 2001 in anime =

The events of 2001 in anime.

== Accolades ==
At the Mainichi Film Awards, Spirited Away won the Animation Film Award and Kujira Tori won the Ōfuji Noburō Award. Internationally, Blood: The Last Vampire was nominated for the Annie Award for Best Animated Feature.

== Releases ==
This list contains numerous notable entries of anime which debuted in 2001. It is not a complete list and represents popular works that debuted as TV, OVA and Movie releases. Web content, DVD specials, TV specials are not on this list.

=== Films ===
A list of anime that debuted in theaters between January 1 and December 31, 2001.

Release date	Title	Studio	Director	Running Time (minutes)	Alternate Title
January 13	Initial D: Third Stage	Studio Deen	Shin Misawa	105	
March 3	One Piece: Nejimaki-jima no Daibouken	Toei Animation	Junji Shimizu	55	One Piece: Clockwork Island Adventure
March 10	Doraemon: Nobita and the Winged Braves	Shin-Ei Animation	Tsutomu Shibayama	91	Doraemon: Nobita to Tsubasa no Yuusha-tachi
April 21	Crayon Shin-chan: The Storm Called: The Adult Empire Strikes Back	Shin-Ei Animation	Keiichi Hara	89	Crayon Shin-chan: Arashi wo Yobu Mouretsu! Otona Teikoku no Gyakushuu
April 21	Detective Conan: Countdown to Heaven	TMS Entertainment	Kenji Kodama	100	Meitantei Conan: Tengoku e no Countdown
May 26	Metropolis	Madhouse	Rintaro	113	Metoroporisu
July 2	Final Fantasy: The Spirits Within	Square Pictures	Hironobu Sakaguchi	105	Final Fantasy
July 7	Pokémon 4Ever	OLM	Kunihiko Yuyama	79	Pokemon: Celebi Toki wo Koeta Deai
July 14	Digimon Tamers: Battle of Adventurers	Toei Animation	Tetsuo Imazawa	50	Digimon Tamers: Boukensha-tachi no Tatakai
July 20	Spirited Away	Studio Ghibli	Hayao Miyazaki	125	Sen to Chihiro no Kamikakushi Sen and Chihiro's Spiriting Away
July 21	Princess Arete	Studio 4°C	Sunao Katabuchi	104	Arete Hime
July 28 (Fantasia Film Festival)	Millennium Actress	Madhouse	Satoshi Kon	87	Sennen Joyū
August 18	Saiyuki: Requiem	Pierrot	Hayato Date	95	Gensoumaden Saiyuuki: Requiem - Erabarezaru Mono e no Chinkonka
August 18	Inochi no Chikyuu: Dioxin no Natsu	Magic Bus	Tetsu Dezaki	82	The Summer of Dioxin
September 1	Cowboy Bebop: The Movie	Sunrise Bones (animation production) Bandai Visual	Shinichirō Watanabe	115	Gekijōban Kaubōi Bibappu: Tengoku no Tobira Cowboy Bebop: Heaven's Door Cowboy Bebop: Knockin' on Heaven's Door
December 22	Inuyasha the Movie: Affections Touching Across Time	Sunrise	Toshiya Shinohara	99	InuYasha: Toki wo Koeru Omoi
December 22	Sakura Wars: The Movie	Production I.G	Mitsuru Hongo	85	Sakura Taisen: Katsudou Shashin

=== Television series ===
A list of anime television series that debuted between January 1 and December 31, 2001.

First run start and end dates	Title	Episodes (not including any OVAs)	Studio	Director	Alternate Title
January 6 – June 30	Zoids: New Century	26	Xebec	Takao Kato	Zoido Shinseiki Surasshu Zero
January 8 – December 24	Beyblade	51	Madhouse	Toshifumi Kawase	Bakuten Shūto Beiburēdo
January 8 – March 26	Tales of Eternia The Animation	13	Xebec	Shigeru Ueda	Teiruzu obu etānia THE animēshon
January 9 – March 29	The Daichis: Earth's Defense Family	13	Group TAC	Tetsu Kimura	Chikyuu Bouei Kazoku
January 9 – June 26	Baki the Grappler	24	Group TAC	Hitoshi Nanba	Gurappurā Baki
January 9 – March 27	Earth Maiden Arjuna	13	Satelight	Shouji Kawamori	Chikyū Shōjo Arujuna
January 17 – March 21	Sadamitsu the Destroyer	10	Studio Deen	Kouichi Oohata	Hakaima Sadamitsu
February 4 – January 27, 2002	Motto! Ojamajo Doremi	50	Toei Animation	Takuya Igarashi	More! Useless Witch Doremi
February 18 – March 18	Salaryman Kintaro	20	JCF	Tomoharu Katsumata	Sararīman Kintarō
March 5 – February 25, 2002	Dr. Rin ni Kiitemite!	51	Studio Comet	Shin Misawa	Ask Dr. Rin
April 1 – September 23	Kidou Tenshi Angelic Layer	26	Bones	Hiroshi Nishikiori	Battle Doll Angelic Layer
April 1 – January 27, 2002	Cosmic Baton Girl Comet-san☆	43	Nippon Animation	Mamoru Kanbe	Princess Comet
April 1 – March 31, 2002	Super GALS! Kotobuki Ran	52	Pierrot	Tsuneo Kobayashi	Super GALS!
April 1 – March 31, 2002	Digimon Tamers	51	Toei Animation	Yukio Kaizawa	Digimon: Digital Monsters 03
April 2 – June 25	Comic Party	13	OLM	Norihiko Sudo	Komikku pātī
April 3 – September 18	Mahou Senshi Louie	24	J.C.Staff	Yoshitaka Koyama	Rune Soldier
April 3 – September 25	Jungle wa Itsumo Hare nochi Guu	26	Shin-Ei Animation	Tsutomu Mizushima	Haré+Guu
April 3 – September 25	Star Ocean EX	26	Studio Deen	Shunji Yoshida Hiroshi Watanabe	Sutā ōshan EX
April 4 – June 27	Shin Shirayuki-hime Densetsu Prétear	13	HAL Film Maker	Junichi Sato Kiyoko Sayama	Prétear: The New Legend of Snow White
April 4 – July 4	SoulTaker	13	Tatsunoko Production	Akiyuki Shinbo	Za Sōru Teikā ~Tamashii Gari~
April 4 – September 26	Sister Princess	26	Zexcs	Kiyotaka Ohata	Shisutā purinsesu
April 5 – June 28	Geneshaft	13	Satelight Studio Gazelle	Kazuki Akane	Jīnshafuto
April 6 – July 6	Haja Kyosei G Dangaiou	13	AIC	Toshiki Hirano	Great Dangaioh
April 6 – September 28	Noir	26	Bee Train	Kouichi Mashimo Yuuki Arie (Co-director)	Nowāru
April 6 – March 23, 2002	Dennou Boukenki Webdiver	52	Radix	Hiroshi Negishi Kunitoshi Okajima	Brain Adventure Record Webdiver
April 7 – March 30, 2002	Gyoten Ningen Batseelor	52	Group TAC	Yoshihiro Takamoto	Captain Fatz and the Seamorphs
April 7 – September 29	You're Under Arrest: Fast & Furious	26	Studio Deen	Shougo Koumoto	Taiho Shichau zo: Second Season
April 7 – September 29	Zone of the Enders	26	Sunrise	Tetsuya Watanabe	Zone of the Enders: Dolores
April 7 – September 29	Project ARMS	26	TMS Entertainment	Hajime Kamegaki Hirotoshi Takaya Junichi Takaoka	Purojekuto āmuzu
April 8 – September 30	Galaxy Angel	24	Madhouse	Morio Asaka	Gyarakushī enjeru
April 11 – October 28, 2002	Legend of the Condor Hero	26	Nippon Animation	Jun Takagi Keiji Hayakawa Masami Anno	Shin Chou Kyou Ryo: Condor Hero
April 12 – June 28	Steel Angel Kurumi 2	12	OLM	Naohito Takahashi Kouji Fukazawa (Co-director)	Koutetsu Tenshi Kurumi 2
April 13 – June 29	Hanaukyo Maid Team	12	Daume	Yasunori Ide	Hanaukyou Maid-tai
April 14 – March 30, 2002	Go! Go! Itsutsugo Land	50	Magic Bus	Setsuko Shibuichi	Let's Go Quintuplets
April 14 – January 11, 2002	PaRappa the Rapper	30	J.C.Staff Production I.G	Kazuya Tsurumaki Hiroaki Sakurai	PaRappa the Rapper
May 3 – November 15	BASToF Syndrome	26	Dongwoo A&E		Genei Toushi Bastof Lemon
May 8 – December 4	Shingu: Secret of the Stellar Wars	26	Madhouse	Tatsuo Sato	Gakuen Senki Muryou
May 10 – January 31, 2002	Offside	39	Ashi Productions	Seiji Okuda	Ofusaido
May 21 – August 27	Chance Triangle Session	13	Madhouse	Susumu Kudo	Chance Pop Session
June 15 – December 7	Uniminipet	26	Dongwoo A&E		Uni Mini Pet
July 4 – September 26	I My Me! Strawberry Eggs	13	TNK	Yuuji Yamaguchi	A ~ima~imyi! Sutoroberī eggu
July 4 – September 25, 2002	Shaman King	64	Xebec	Seiji Mizushima	Shāman kingu
July 4 – December 26	s.CRY.ed	26	Sunrise	Goro Taniguchi Rion Kujo	Scryed
July 5 – December 27	Fruits Basket	26	Studio Deen	Akitaro Daichi	Furuba
July 5 – September 27	Magical Nyan Nyan Taruto	12	Madhouse TNK	Sunaga Tsukasa	Magical Meow Meow Taruto
July 6 – September 28	Cosmo Warrior Zero	13	Vega Entertainment	Kazuyoshi Yokota	Cosmowarrior Zero
July 7 – September 28, 2002	Nono-chan	61	Toei Animation	Nobutaka Nishizawa	Nonoko
July 11 – September 26	Seikai no Senki II	10	Sunrise	Yasuchika Nagaoka	Banner of the Stars II
July 24 – December 25	Grappler Baki: Saidai Tournament-hen	24	Group TAC	Katsuyoshi Yatabe	Baki the Grappler: Saidai Tournament-hen
July 30 – October 22	Samurai Girl Real Bout High School	13	Gonzo	Shinichi Tokairin	Samurai gāru riaru bauto haisu kūru
August 11 – April 26, 2004	Cubix	26	Xebec		Saiko Robot Kombock
August 13 – February 11, 2002	Captain Kuppa	26	Bee Train	Kouichi Mashimo	Sabaku no Kaizoku! Captain Kuppa
October 2 – September 24, 2002	Shiawase Sou no Okojo-san	51	Radix	Yuusuke Yamamoto	Shiawase Apartment's Okojo-san
October 2 – March 26, 2002	Kaze no Yojimbo	25	Pierrot	Hayato Date	Bodyguard of the Wind
October 2 – March 26, 2002	Final Fantasy: Unlimited	25	Gonzo	Mahiro Maeda	Fainaru fantajī: Anrimiteddo
October 3 – March 27, 2002	Chicchana Yukitsukai Sugar	24	J.C.Staff	Shinichiro Kimura	A Little Snow Fairy Sugar
October 3 – March 27, 2002	X	24	Madhouse	Yoshiaki Kawajiri	X the TV Series
October 4 – December 20	Otogi Story Tenshi no Shippo	12	Tokyo Kids	Kazuhiro Ochi	Angel Tales
October 5 – January 18, 2002	Vandread: The Second Stage	13	Gonzo	Takeshi Mori	Vuandoreddo the sekando stage
October 5 – December 28	Babel II: Beyond Infinity	13	Vega Entertainment		Babel Nisei (2001)
October 5 – December 27	Najica Dengeki Sakusen	12	Studio Fantasia	Katsuhiko Nishijima	Najica Dengeki Sakusen
October 6 – March 30, 2002	Geisters: Fractions of the Earth	26	Plum	Kouji Ito	Guystars: Fractions of the Earth
October 6 – September 27, 2003	Kirby: Right Back at Ya!	100	Studio Sign	Souji Yoshikawa	Kirby of the Stars
October 6 – March 30, 2002	Project ARMS: The 2nd Chapter	26	TMS Entertainment		Project Arms 2
October 6 – December 29	Mahoromatic: Automatic Maiden	12	Gainax Shaft	Hiroyuki Yamaga	Mahoromatikku
October 7 – January 26, 2003	Gekitou! Crush Gear Turbo	68	Sunrise	Shuji Iuchi	Gekitō! Kurasshugia TURBO
October 7 – October 6, 2002	Captain Tsubasa: Road to 2002	52	Group TAC	Gisaburo Sugii Isamu Imakake	Captain Tsubasa
October 10 – March 26, 2003	Hikaru no Go	75	Pierrot	Susumu Nishizawa Tetsuya Endo Jun Kamiya	Hikaru's Go
October 10 – March 23, 2005	Tennis no Oujisama	178	Trans Arts	Takayuki Hamana	The Prince of Tennis
October 11 – January 17, 2002	Hellsing	13	Gonzo	Umanosuke Iida Yasunori Urata	Herushingu
October 12 – February 17, 2002	Kokoro Toshokan	13	Studio Deen	Koji Masunari	Kokoro Library
October 13 – April 6, 2002	Kasumin	26	OLM	Mitsuru Hongo	Kasumin 1st Series
October 13 – March 30, 2002	Vampiyan Kids	23	Production I.G	Masatsugu Arakawa	Nanchatte VAMPIYAN
October 13 – September 28, 2002	Groove Adventure Rave	51	Studio Deen	Takashi Watanabe	Rave Master
October 14 – August 27, 2003	Cyborg 009: The Cyborg Soldier	50	Japan Vistec	Jun Kawagoe	Cyborg 009

=== Original video animations ===
A list of original video animations that debuted between January 1 and December 31, 2001.

First run start and end dates	Title	Episodes	Studio	Director(s)	Alternate Title
January 21	Vandread: Taidou-hen	1	Gonzo	Shinji Higuchi Takeshi Mori	Vandread Integral Vandread The Movement Stage
January 25 – July 25	Spirit of Wonder	2	Ajia-do	Takashi Anno	Spirit of Wonder: Scientific Boys Club
January 25 – June 27	Angelique: Seichi yori Ai wo Komete	3	Yumeta Company	Akira Shimizu	Angelique: From the Sanctuary with Love
February 21	Cat Soup	1	J.C.Staff	Tatsuo Satō	Nekojiru-So Nekojiru Grass
February 21	Zone of the Enders: 2167 Idolo	1	Sunrise	Tetsuya Watanabe	Z.O.E. 2167 Idolo
March 7 – December 19	Puni Puni Poemy	2	J.C.Staff	Shinichi Watanabe	Puni Puni ☆ Poemii
March 30	Animation Runner Kuromi	1	Yumeta Company	Akitarou Daichi	Animation Seisaku Shinkou Kuromi-chan
April 27 – June 22	Malice@Doll	3	Soeishinsha	Keitaro Motonaga	Marisu dōru
May 17 – January 26, 2007	Gundam Evolve	15	Sunrise	Shuko Murase Yoshitomo Yonetani	Mobile Suit Gundam Evolve
May 23 – February 6, 2002	Read or Die	3	Studio Deen	Koji Masunari	Rīdo oa Dai
June 25 – February 25, 2002	Alien 9	4	J.C.Staff	Yasuhiro Irie Jiro Fujimoto	Alien Nine
July 19 – May 23, 2003	Happy Lesson	5	Studio Kyuuma Venet Chaos Project	Hideki Tonokatsu Takafumi Hoshikawa Takeshi Yamaguchi	Happy Lesson OVA
July 21 – June 25, 2003	Bible Black	6	Studio Jam	Sho Hanebu Kazuyuki Honda	
August 2	Good Morning Call	1	Production I.G	Takayuki Hamana	Guddo mōningu kōru
August 10 – May 24, 2002	One: Kagayaku Kisetsu e	4	Arms	Shigenori Kageyama	One: To a Shining Season
August 24 – January 25, 2002	10 Tokyo Warriors	3	T.P.O	Noboru Ishiguro	Tokyo Juushouden: Fuuma Gogyou Denshou
August 25	X	1	Madhouse	Yoshiaki Kawajiri	X: An Omen
September 25 – September 20, 2002	Mazinkaiser	7	Brain's Base	Masahiko Murata	Majinkaizā
November 9 – April 26, 2002	Usagi-chan de Cue!!	3	Chaos Project	Tooru Yoshida	Usagichan, It's my rabbit and it's Cue!
November 21 – March 6, 2002	Memories Off	3	E&G Films		Memorīzu ofu
December 19	Kai Doh Maru	1	Production I.G	Kanji Wakabayashi	Kaidoumaru
December 19 – March 20, 2002	Samurai X: Reflection	2	Studio Deen	Kazuhiro Furuhashi	Rurouni Kenshin: Meiji Kenkaku Romantan - Seisou-hen
December 22	Kanzen Shouri Daiteiou	1	Sunrise		Kanzen Shouri Daiteioh
	Soreyuke Marin-chan	3			
	Blood Shadow	3			
	Immoral Sisters	3			
	Moonlight Lady	5			

== See also ==
- 2001 in animation
