= Lona Rietschel =

German comic-book artist (1933–2017)

- Born: 21 September 1933
- Died: 19 December 2017 (aged 84)
- Occupation: comic artist

Lona Rietschel (21 September 1933, in Reppen – 19 December 2017 in Berlin) was a German comic artist.

== Life and work ==
Lona Rietschel completed a degree in fashion graphics and animation with the aim of becoming an animated film artist and then worked as a model cutter at the Berlin-Weißensee Academy of Art. As the DEFA studio for animated films was relocated to Dresden and Rietschel did not want to leave Berlin, she applied to the comic magazine Mosaik. She was hired in 1960 after the illustrator Nikol Dimitriades left for West Germany. Lona Rietschel quickly became the magazine's most important illustrator and worked on over 400 issues. She designed the main characters Dig, Dag and Digedag (the final version) as well as Ritter Runkel and secondary characters such as the notorious band of buccaneers "Teufelsbrüder" (German for "Devils Brothers").

When Hannes Hegen left Mosaik in 1975 in a dispute with the publisher and took his characters, the Digedags, with him, new characters were created. Lothar Dräger invented the names and characters of the Abrafaxe and Lona Rietschel took care of the character development. She remained loyal to the monthly magazine until 1999 and regularly drew her Abrafaxe until old age. Both the covers of the anthologies and the motifs for the 2006 calendar were drawn by her. Last but not least, Lona Rietschel's timeless design and her drawing skills made Mosaik a comic legend.

In May 2013, Rietschel was awarded the PENG!Prize for her life's work.

== Literature (chronological order) ==
- Matthias Friske: Die Geschichte des 'MOSAIK von Hannes Hegen': A comic legend in the GDR. Lukas-Verlag, Berlin, 2008, ISBN 978-3-86732-034-4.
- Mark Lehmstedt: Die geheime Geschichte der Digedags. The publication and censorship history of the mosaic by Hannes Hegen. Lehmstedt Verlag, Leipzig, 2010, ISBN 978-3-937146-99-7.
- Rietschel, Lona. In: Dietmar Eisold (ed.): Lexikon Künstler in der DDR. Verlag Neues Leben, Berlin, 2010. ISBN 978-3-355-01761-9, p. 773
- Kurzbiografie zu: Rietschel, Lona. In: Wer war wer in der DDR? 5. Ausgabe. Band 2. Ch. Links, Berlin 2010, ISBN 978-3-86153-561-4.
- Klaus D. Schleiter (ed.) and Lona Rietschel: Lona Rietschel – Bilder meines Lebens. Steinchen für Steinchen Verlag, Berlin, 2013, ISBN 978-3-864620-53-9.
