= The Abrafaxe – Under The Black Flag =

2001 film by Gerhard Hahn

- German theatrical release poster
- Die Abrafaxe – Unter schwarzer Flagge
- Directed by: Gerhard Hahn; Tony Power
- Production companies: Universal Pictures Produktion; Abrafaxe Trickfilm; Hahn Film
- Distributed by: United International Pictures
- Release date: 25 October 2001
- Running time: 81 minutes
- Country: Germany
- Languages: German; English

The Abrafaxe – Under The Black Flag (German: Die Abrafaxe – Unter schwarzer Flagge and also known as The Pirates of Tortuga: Under The Black Flag) is a German film directed by Gerhard Hahn and Tony Power. It was released in 2001 and is based on the popular and long running German comic strip series Die Abrafaxe by Lona Rietschel and Lothar Dräger.

== Plot ==
The lead characters are three kids named Abrax, Brabax and Califax (Alex and Max in English). They sneak into the back of the museum where they find a rare golden Aztec bowl. While playing around with it, its layers move, and they are transported back in time. Both Abrax and Brabax land in the cargo hold of a Spanish galleon under captain Don Archimbaldo.

Califax lands in the pirate city of Tortuga governed by legendary beautiful and dangerous pirate Anne Bonny. Eventually Anne Bonny together with Abrax, Brabax, Califax and her crew uncover the secret island and treasure of El Dorado.

When Abrax, Brabax and Califax decide that it is time to go home, they use the rare Aztec golden bowl to return to the museum where they put back the bowl. They are caught by a security guard and the museum tour guide, then released. Just when they are outside of the museum, they see a light similar to the one before when they were travelling, but now on top of the museum. (It is known that by accident the security guard of museum and the museum tour guide travelled in time, with a new adventure beginning where the old one left off.)

== Cast and characters ==
Original German version

- Kim Hasper – Abrax (Alex in the English version)
- David Turba – Brabax (Max in the English version)
- Ilona Schulz – Califax
- Nena – Anne Bonny
- Helmut Krauss – Blackbeard
- Santiago Ziesmer – Don Archimbaldo
- Wilfried Herbst – Prado
- Ulrich Voß – Shanty
- Michael Pan – Carlos
- Stefan Friedrich – Juan

English-dubbed version

- Justin Bradley – Califax
- Holly Gauthier-Frankel – Anne Bonny
- A.J. Henderson – Blackbeard/Prado
- Rick Jones – Don Archimbaldo
- Susan Glover – Museum Curator

== Release ==
The film was released on DVD in the United Kingdom in 2007 by Brightspark Productions. In 2012, Brightspark re-released the film under the name Pirates! as a way to piggyback on the release of The Pirates! In an Adventure with Scientists!.
