= Kurt Vieweg =

German agricultural politician

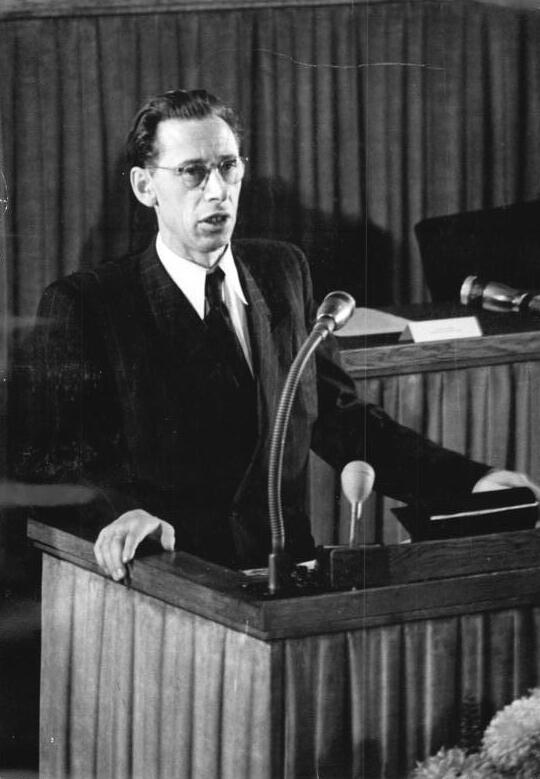
Kurt Vieweg at the 13th-14th Session of the East German parliament

Kurt Vieweg (born 29 October 1911 in Göttingen – died 2 December 1976 in Greifswald) was one of the leading agricultural politicians in the early years of the GDR. He was at various times Secretary General of the VdgB (the Peasants Mutual Aid Association), deputy in the parliament (the Volkskammer) and a member of the Central Committee of the SED.

== Early days and emigration ==
Kurt Vieweg was born in Göttingen, the son of a bank employee. After attending high school, in 1930-1931 he completed an apprenticeship as an agricultural agent in Eisleben. In his youth he was a member of the Wandervogel movement (similar to the Boy Scouts). In 1930 he joined the Hitler Youth, in which he remained until 1932, and was promoted there to the level of deputy "Jungbannführer" (Junior colonel). In parallel, from 1931 he was working for the KJVD, the Young Communist League of Germany. By 1932 Vieweg was a member of the KJVD in Weissenfels and member of the Commiunist Party, the KPD. His final Communist activities in Germany were as an employee of the KJVD for Saxony-Anhalt.

In autumn 1933 Vieweg emigrated to Denmark. He was initially in Lyngby and Gentofte working for International Red Aid. From 1935 until the occupation of the country in 1940 Vieweg was a visiting student at the Royal Veterinary and Agricultural University in Copenhagen. In parallel, from 1936 he was an employee of the illegal KPD leadership for the Northern sector. Vieweg was member of a group led by Walter Weidauer which was called the "Peasant Commission", which aimed to make contact with farmer groups in Germany. This group published the magazine "Bauernbriefe" (Farmers' Letters), for which Vieweg wrote articles under the pseudonym "Oswald". Since in the public image he was not necessarily seen as a communist, from the beginning of 1940 he could officially study agriculture. By the German occupation in April 1940 Vieweg was however again forced into illegality. The next few years were spent largely with little political action. He dealt mainly with collection of information on Scandinavian agriculture for the Moscow Communist Party headquarters. In 1943 the KPD sent most of its members in Denmark to Sweden, including Vieweg. There he was interned briefly in a camp near Tyllesand. He then worked as a forester and as a factory worker. As leader of the Communist Party group in Gothenburg-Borås he here came, probably for the first time, into contact with Herbert Wehner. Since Vieweg could prove his guest studentship in Copenhagen to have been successful, from 1944 he was able to resume his studies at the Ultuna Agricultural University in Uppsala as part of a Swedish aid program for Scandinavian Hitler refugees. During his stay in Sweden, he was greatly influenced by the agricultural policies of the Swedish Social Democratic Party program. This influence was shown in his policy statement, published in 1944, "The farmers and the upcoming democratic republic" in which he called for the creation of cooperatives, but also spoke out in favour of maintaining the capitalist mode of production. This programme and his course of study were the basis for Vieweg's status as the agricultural expert of the exiled KPD. In the spring of 1945, Vieweg returned to Denmark. He was initially secretary of the Anti-Fascist Refugee Committee in Copenhagen and was later taken on as an employee at the Danish Ministry of Social Affairs. Before his return to Germany Vieweg was also the political head of the Copenhagen KPD group.

== Return to Germany ==
In summer 1946 Vieweg and his wife Gertrud returned via Poland to Halle in the Soviet occupation zone. As a former Communist Party member, he now became a member of the Socialist Unity Party (SED). He was assigned to the VdgB and became its deputy secretary for Saxony-Anhalt. Soon, however, he rose to the position of National Secretary. In mid-August 1947, not least because of his professional qualifications, Vieweg was entrusted by party decision with the post of Secretary General of the VdgB, succeeding Anton Jadasch. The first German peasant congress, at which the regional associations were dissolved and the central Association was founded, legitimized this decision with an official election. Vieweg now became very active and lectured at various universities about his agricultural policy ideas in which, among other things, he repeatedly defended the family farm. He argued consistently for the retention of the former agricultural structures and for the "full development of the private initiative of farms". This scientific activity in 1951 led to his appointment as full member of the German Academy of Agricultural Sciences. In 1948 Vieweg was taken on as an employee of the Office of the German Economic Commission (DWK), the predecessor of the East German government.

In January 1949, Kurt Vieweg was co-opted into the party leadership of the SED and at the third SED Party Congress, in 1950, elected onto the Central Committee of the SED, where he remained until 1954, and there acted as secretary for rural affairs. In this role, Vieweg designed, within the framework of the existing Soviet policy on Germany, several agricultural programmes, including some for the whole of Germany, influenced by German and Scandinavian social democratic programmes, but also using ideas from the Reichsnährstand, the agricultural regulatory body from the Nazi period. In the elections for the Volkskammer (parliament) on 19 October 1950 he was chosen as a deputy for the SED, which he remained for the entire first term. On behalf of the Central Committee of the SED Vieweg set to work on the construction of illegal organisations, including the conspiratorial "All-German Working Group for Agriculture and Forestry" in West Germany, which he also led.

== Enemy of the party ==
In the spring of 1952, however, this illegal (from a GDR viewpoint) work of the VdgB in the West was revealed. This event together with an investigation in a party purge by the Central Party Control Commission of the SED of Vieweg's activity in his Scandinavian emigration brought him gradually into disrepute. As it was suspected that he might flee, he was kept under observation by the Ministry of State Security (the Stasi). In consequence of the investigation by the Central Party Control Commission, despite very conflicting accounts by witnesses of his activities in the Nordic countries Vieweg was accused of faking questionnaires, which made it necessary, in the Commission's view, for him at least to be removed from the Secretariat of the SED. Officially a resignation for health reasons was announced. He was also removed from his position as General Secretary of the VdgB. Vieweg was not dropped altogether, however, but tasked with setting up the Institute of Agricultural Economics at the German Academy of Agricultural Sciences. He was now in a position to begin an academic career. He received his doctorate in 1955 at the Humboldt University of Berlin and was appointed professor of the German Academy of Agricultural Sciences. As editor along with Otto Rosenkranz of the multi-volume reference work "Handbook for cooperative farmers" in the same year he received the National Prize of the GDR. Vieweg claimed a leading position for his institute in agro-economic research in the GDR. This claim, and the creation of internal party brochures that were strongly influenced by his study trip to Sweden and Denmark in November 1955 and were met with little enthusiasm by many high SED functionaries, did not work to his advantage. By-passing him and his institution, the SED created an agricultural commission to promote collectivization. Disillusioned by this policy and affected by the revelations of the 20th Congress of the CPSU and the events of autumn 1956 in Hungary Vieweg criticized the existing agricultural policy of the SED. In November 1956, therefore, Vieweg proposed his own programme with the title "New agricultural programme for the development of agriculture in the building of socialism in the GDR". During the 30th Central Committee plenum on 30 January 1957 this programme was denounced by Walter Ulbricht as "restoration of capitalism in agriculture". They came down heavily on him. On 18 March 1957 the Central Party Control Commission of the SED decided on his expulsion from the party together with his forced resignation from all political office.

== Escape and imprisonment ==
In this situation, Vieweg saw his only way out as flight to West Germany. On 27 March 1957 he set off for West Berlin. He initially found refuge as guest of Herbert Wehner. Then on 19 October he unexpectedly returned to the GDR. (It has been suggested that Vieweg returned having been given a guarantee of impunity by Markus Wolf, and at the urging of Herbert Wehner.) Probably in breach of promises given, he was immediately arrested, although the warrant was not issued until 27 March 1958. In October 1959, the Supreme Court of the GDR convicted Kurt Vieweg of "treason" and sentenced him to twelve years in prison, along with forfeiture of all titles and claims. In December 1964 he was released from prison in Bautzen by a pardon of the State Council.

On 27 December 1990, the verdict was set aside by the district court in Berlin.

== As an academic in Greifswald ==
In 1965 Vieweg was given a job in the Nordic Institute of the University of Greifswald. In 1969 he was research group leader and he took up teaching again. As well as his research Vieweg also worked for the Main Intelligence Directorate of the Stasi. From 1971 he was a full professor, until he retired in 1974. He continued to live in Greifswald, but died of cancer in a Berlin hospital on 2 December 1976.

== Sources ==
- Wer war wer in der DDR?
- Michael F. Scholz: Bauernopfer der deutschen Frage. Der Kommunist Kurt Vieweg im Dschungel der Geheimdienste. Aufbau Taschenbuch Verlag, Berlin 1997, ISBN 3746680301.
- Michael F. Scholz: Skandinavische Erfahrungen erwünscht?. Franz Steiner Verlag, Stuttgart 2000, ISBN 3515076514. (auf Google Books)
