= Hayato Date =

Japanese animation director

- 伊達 勇登
- Born: May 22, 1962 (age 64); Japan
- Occupation: Animation director
- Known for: Gensomaden Saiyuki; Naruto

Hayato Date (伊達 勇登, Date Hayato; born May 22, 1962) is a Japanese animation director most known for the animated adaptations of Saiyuki and Naruto.

== Filmography ==
=== Films ===
- Saiyuki: Requiem (2001)
- 劇場版 NARUTO-ナルト- 木ノ葉の里の大うん動会 (short, 2004)
- Honō no Chūnin Shiken! Naruto Bāsasu Konohamaru!! (short, 2011)
- Road to Ninja: Naruto the Movie (2012)

=== OVAs ===
- Dennō Sentai Voogie's Angel外伝 進め！スーパー・エンジェルス！ (1998)

=== TV series ===
- Flame of Recca (1997–1998) (episodes 15, 23, 29, 36 and 41)
- Rerere no Tensai Bakabon (1999–2000)
- Gensomaden Saiyuki (2000)
- Kaze no Yojimbo (2001)
- Naruto (2002–2007)
- Tokyo Underground (2002)
- Naruto: Shippuden (2007–2016)
- Convenience Store Boy Friends (2017)
- Gunjō no Magmell (2019)
