= Mosaik =

German comic book magazine

Mosaik is a German comic book magazine. First published in December 1955, it is the longest-running German (and European) monthly comic book and the only one originating in East Germany that still exists. Mosaik also appeared in other countries and other languages. In its English-language edition it was published under the title Mosaic.

Mosaik was created by illustrator and caricaturist Hannes Hegen. From 1955 to 1975, the protagonists of Mosaik were Dig, Dag and Digedag, known together as the Digedags. They were replaced in 1976 by Abrax, Brabax and Califax, known together as the Abrafaxe, who are still the main characters today.

More than 200 million issues have been sold from 1955 until today. At the height of its popularity, prior to German reunification, Mosaik had a print run of almost a million copies per month. After reunification, the print run has varied from more than 100,000 in the early 1990s to about 80,000 in 2007.

== Digedags years ==
The East German publisher Verlag Neues Leben, in East Berlin, had wanted to counter Western comics and magazines with a magazine of their own when Hannes Hegen approached them with his ideas for Mosaik and the Digedags. Reaching an agreement with Neues Leben, Hegen created the first issue of Mosaik for publishing in December 1955. Mosaik was published quarterly until July 1957, when it switched to a monthly schedule that has continued uninterrupted to this day. To support the schedule, the publisher hired additional artists, colorists and writers to support Hegen – a team which became known as the Mosaik-Kollektiv (Mosaik Collective). Only Hegen was credited on the cover, however.

== Abrafaxe years ==
In 1975, Hegen left the publisher over a disagreement and took the rights to the Digedags characters with him. The Mosaik-Kollektiv, not wanting to end publication of Mosaik, together created new characters to replace the Digedags. The final versions of the Abrafaxe were created by writer Lothar Dräger and artist Lona Rietschel. During the half-year period of creating the new characters and stories, reprints of old Digedags stories were run in Mosaik, until the new characters premiered in January 1976.

== English-language editions ==
The English editions of Mosaik have mostly appeared mostly under the name Mosaic. Of Hannes Hegen's Mosaik, issue 105, Die Seeräuberburg, was issued in a limited run in 1965 in English as The Pirates Castle. According to a former staff member at the publishing house, this was intended as a promotional issue for the United States market. An agreement had been reached to publish the comic books in the US; however, because of the US policy of economic embargo policy against Eastern European states in the Cold War, the contract could not be fulfilled.

Ten anthology volumes of Hegen's Mosaik were published in English for the international market under the name Mosaic Comic Books:

1. The Digedags in America
2. The Digedags on the Mississippi
3. The Digedags and the Indians
4. The Digedags in the Rocky Mountains
5. The Digedags in New Orleans
6. The Digedags on the Missouri
7. The Digedags and the Golden Treasure
8. The Digedags in Panama
9. The Digedags and the Pirate Island
10. The Digedags in New York

In the mid-1980s, 42 Mosaic books were published in English in the GDR for India. There is also a promotional flyer for these issues, which states that the Mosaic with the Abrafaxe is published in English and Arabic in addition to German, advertises for subscriptions, and includes an order form.

English Number	German Number	English Title	German Title
1	9/84	Pursuit Of Robbers	Den Räubern Auf Den Fersen
2	10/84	As Prisoners Of Amazonians	Als Gefangene Der Amazonen
3	11/84	Alexandra And Roxane	Roxane Und Alexander
4	12/84	The Temple Of Vishnu	Der Tempel Des Wischnu
5	1/85	Devta's Doot	Der Götterbote
6	2/85	Deported	Abgeschoben
7	3/85	Marriage Proposal	Die Brautwerbung
8	4/85	In The Diamond Mine	In Der Diamantenmine
9	5/85	Escaped Into The Desert	Ausbruch In Die Wüste
10	6/85	The Ship Of Nearchos	Das Schiff Des Nearchos
11	7/85	On The Salt Lake	Auf Dem Salzsee
12	8/85	Trick And Counter Trick	List Und Gegenlist
13	9/85	In Great Danger	In Großer Gefahr
14	10/85	Monastery In The Mountains	Das Kloster In Den Bergen
15	11/85	The Fulfilment Of Prophesy	Die Erfüllte Weissagung
16	12/85	King Alexandra	König Alexander
17	1/86	Mysterious Hermit	Der Rätselhafte Einsiedler
18	2/86	In The Empire Of Yeti	Im Reich Des Yeti
19	3/86	Abducted And Wanted	Entführt Und Gesucht
40	4/86	The Mystery Of Brahman	Das Geheimnis Des Brahmanen
21	5/86	On The Ganges	Auf Dem Ganges
22	6/86	A Juggling Trick	Ein Gauklertrick
23	7/86	Tiger Hunt In Jungle	Tigerjagd Im Dschungel
24	8/86	In A Predicament	In Schwieriger Lage
25	9/86	Chamatkarak	Der Wundertäter
26	10/86	Kings Of The Poor	Der König Der Armen
35	11/86	In The Bay Of Bengal	Am Bengalischen Meer
28	12/86	Last Miracle	Das Letzte Wunder
29	1/87	A New Puzzle	Ein Neues Rätsel
30	2/87	The Disappeared Treasure	Der Verschwundene Staatsschatz
31	3/87	Unexpected Rescue	Unerwartete Rettung
32	4/87	New From Roxania	Neues Aus Roxanien
33	5/87	Cheats Among Themselves	Gauner Unter Sich
34	6/87	Golden Pillar	Die Goldene Säule
35	7/87	Buried Hopes	Verschüttete Hoffnungen
36	8/87	Missing In Jungle	Im Dschungel Verschollen
37	9/87	Master Of Animal	Der Herr Der Tiere
38	10/87	The Last Chance	Die Letzte Chance
39	11/87	The Siege	Die Belagerung
43	12/85	A Happy End	Ein Glückliches Ende
41	1/89	Orang Laut	Die Orang Laut
42	2/88	A Crazy Invention	Eine Tolle Erfindung

== Other known foreign-language publications ==
Reissues of Mosaik magazines and books have appeared in many different countries, almost always in the respective national language.

- Albania
  - Mozaik comic magazine (1971)
- Belgium and Netherlands (Mosaik in Dutch language)
  - Mosaic book – Dig en Dag op Stap (1972 – 1978?)
  - Mosaic anthology – Dig en Dag op Stap (1978)
  - Mosaic-Books
  - Een Stripboek – Dikkerdaks In America
  - Een Stripboek – Dikkerdaks Aan Mississippi
- China
  - Mosaik books (2000–present)
  - Mosaik Albums
  - Mosaik Onepager
- Croatia
  - Mozaik books 1– (2004–present, bimonthly)
- Czechoslovakia
  - Newspaper Reprints Comic magazine of the Czechoslovak Communist Youth Organization Pionýr with Rytíř Runkl – Ritter Runkel (1968)
- Czech Republic
  - Albums (2003–present)
  - Congo – Abrafaxové v Africe
  - Small detectives
  - Onepager
  - Mateřídouška (Onepager – from # 9 / 2005)
- Finland
  - Mosaiikki – Mosaik comic magazine (1962–1967)
  - Mosaic-Books
  - Mosaiikki (1980–7 Books)
- France
  - Hollywood Pursuit 2 (1998)
- Greece
  - Mosaic books and Mosaik comic magazine (2001–present)
- Hungary
  - Mozaik comic magazine 1971 – 1976 Digedags, 1976–1990 and 2001–present Abrafaxe
  - Mosaic-Books:
  - Digedagék Amerikában (1987)
  - Detektív Palánták: Forró nyomon a három manó (2001)
  - Na még egyszer Robin! (2002)
  - Kongó (2003)
  - Vitorlát fel, Robin! (2006)
  - Mozaik books of Abrafaxe and Digedags (2006–present): reprints of previously published books in anthologies
- India
  - Mosaic – 1–42 in English (1986)
- Indonesia
  - Abrafaxe issues
  - Mosaik Abrafaxe – 1–6 (2001–2002)
  - Albums – Among black flag (2002) – The Abrafaxe – Harta karun
- Korea
  - Mosaic books – 1 – (2003–present)
- Lebanon
  - Mosaik – released in Arabic (1984)
- Romania
  - Mozaic comic magazine 1–3 (2005–2006)
- Russia
  - Mosaika – comic magazine No. 1–14 (1993–1994) in Russian
  - New Life (Journal of the German-speaking population of Russia) – The journey of Abrafaxe to Goslar (in German)
- Slovenia
  - Onepager (2003–present)
  - Hepko (Slovene edition)
  - Happy (English edition)
- Spain
  - Various Mosaik albums in Spanish and Catalan (2004–present)
- Turkey
  - Abrafaxe issues
  - Bacaxizlar 1 – (2001/ # 1–8)
- Yugoslavia
  - Mozaik – in *Serbo-Croatian (1971)
- Vietnam
  - Mosaik comic magazine - 1-8 (2005–present)

== Sources ==
- Matthias Friske. Die Geschichte des MOSAIK von Hannes Hegen: eine Comic-Legende in der DDR. Berlin: Lukas, 2008. ISBN 978-3-86732-034-4. (in German)
- Mark Lehmstedt: Die geheime Geschichte der Digedags. Die Publikations- und Zensurgeschichte des Mosaik von Hannes Hegen, Leipzig 2010, Lehmstedt Verlag, ISBN 978-3-937146-99-7.(in German)
- "Книги пользователя portvein777 / Все книги / Главная / Библиотека исторической литературы". Библиотека исторической литературы (in Russian).
