= List of Flame of Recca episodes =

Key visual for the series

Flame of Recca is a Japanese anime television series, based on the manga series Flame of Recca by Nobuyuki Anzai. The story follows Recca Hanabishi, a teenage ninja with the ability to manipulate fire and a descendant of the Hokage, a ninja clan wiped out centuries ago. The series was produced by Studio Pierrot and directed by Noriyuki Abe, with series composition handled by Hiroshi Hashimoto. It aired for 42 episodes from July 19, 1997, to July 10, 1998, on Fuji TV. Pony Canyon has released the entire series on DVD and laserdisc, while Geneon released it in two DVD boxsets on April 22 and June 24, 2005.

The series aired in Southeast Asia on AXN and Animax Asia. In North America, the series was licensed for an English release by Viz Media, which released it in ten DVD sets between October 26, 2004, and January 9, 2007. Discotek Media re-licensed the series in 2014 and released it on DVD on February 24, 2015. Discotek Media released the series on Blu-ray on May 27, 2025.

The series feature background music composed by Yusuke Honma. The series's opening theme song is "Nanka Shiawase" (なんか幸せ; lit. 'I Feel Kind of Happy'), performed by The Oystars. The first ending theme song is "Love is Changing" (episodes 1–32), performed by Hikaru Nishida, while the second ending theme song is "Zutto Kimi no Soba de" (ずっと君の傍で; lit. 'Always by Your Side'), performed by Yuki Masuda (episodes 33–42).

== Episodes ==
No.	Title	Original release date
1	"The Princess and her Ninja! Power Awakens!"; Transliteration: "Hime to ninja mezameta chikara!!" (Japanese: 姫と忍者 めざめた力!!)	July 19, 1997
A boy named Recca Hanibishi is obsessed with being a ninja. After an accident, a girl named Yanagi Sakoshita heals him, and he declares her to be his princess, and pledges to be her loyal ninja. After an encounter with Kage Hōshi, he learns that he has the ability to control fire.
2	"Fire and Wind, the Fatal Temptation!"; Transliteration: "Honō to fūjin kiken na yūwaku!!" (Japanese: 炎と風神 危険な誘惑!!)	August 2, 1997
Fūko Kirisawa is irritated by the fact that Recca became someone's ninja just because he felt like it, and accepts the Fūjin, an object that enables its user to control wind, from Kage Hōshi. The Fūjin, however, is rigged with a mind control orb that enables Kage Hōshi to manipulate Fūko's thoughts. Fūko then arranges to meet Recca on the school grounds after dark to fight with him. Recca is at a disadvantage at first, but is saved by Domon Ishijima after the latter is informed by Yanagi of what was happening. Recca eventually resorts to using his power to control fire to combat Fūko.
3	"The Soldier of Water! The Plane of Revenge!"; Transliteration: "Mizu no kenshi fukushū no yaiba!!" (Japanese: 水の剣士 復讐の刃!!)	August 9, 1997
Recca and Domon manage to defeat Fūko and destroy the mind control orb, and they learn that Kage Hōshi cannot be killed. The next day, Tokiya Mikagami confronts Recca and states that he knows of what occurred the night before, but Recca acts oblivious. Shortly after, it is revealed that Tokiya is pursuing Recca because Kage Hōshi led him to believe that Recca may have connections to the men who murdered his sister when he was a child. He eventually confronts Recca in the park, and attacks him with Ensui, a sword that manipulates water. As Recca is about to be killed, Yanagi rushes in to try to stop the fight, and Tokiya is shocked upon seeing her because she looks just like his deceased sister.
4	"The Maze of Mirror and the Determined Flame"; Transliteration: "Kagami no meikyū kesshi no kaen!!" (Japanese: 鏡の迷宮 決死の火炎!!)	August 16, 1997
As Yanagi appears, Tokiya withdraws from the fight and Yanagi manages to heal Recca using her powers. Feeling down because he let Yanagi save him, Yanagi recommends they go to the amusement park. On the way to buying some drinks, Tokiya appears and takes Yanagi to Mirror House. Recca then confronts Tokiya in order to save Yanagi, after a fierce battle, Tokiya admit defeat. It is also revealed that Kage Houshi is actually Recca's biological mother, and make them fight each other to strengthen their power.
5	"The Mystery of the Hokage Ninja"; Transliteration: "Kage no ningun Hokage no nazo!!" (Japanese: 影の忍軍 火影の謎!!)	August 20, 1997
Recca meets a teacher that knows a lot about the Hokage Ninjas. Yanagi is kidnapped by people from Kurei's Uruha (his Death Squad), including a greatly skilled but rather innocent swordschild named Koganei.
6	"The Dangerous Master of Flame, Kurei!"; Transliteration: "Kyōfu no enjutsushi Kurei!!" (Japanese: 恐怖の炎術士 紅麗!!)	September 13, 1997
Yanagi wakes up to find herself in a huge bedroom. She meets Koganei, who has washed her clothes and tells her he did not mean to hurt her, but that he must follow Kurei's orders. It is revealed the Kurei's 'father' has ordered the kidnapping of Yanagi, because she has the innate ability to heal and he thinks this can help him achieve immortality. Kage Houshi appears and encourages Recca to fight for Yanagi's release. Recca, Domon and Fuuko team up to go for this. They head to Kurei's mansion, but are met by a stone statue called Maria that shoots lasers at them, upon entrance.
7	"A Deadly Struggle, the Guardian of Stone"; Transliteration: "Ishi no bannin shi no GAME" (Japanese: 石の番人 死のゲーム!!)	September 27, 1997
Recca, Domon and Fuuko realize that Maria is too fast for them but, taking advantage of the time she needs to occasionally recharge her laser, they defeat her. As they travel to the next room, the group encounters a room full of mannequins playing instruments and holding festivities. There they meet Katashira Reira (doll controller) and her doll Primera, and a battle breaks off between them and Fuuko.
8	"Room of the Doll! Fuko's Fatal Combat!"; Transliteration: "Ningyō no heya! Fūko no shitō!!" (Japanese: 人形の部屋!風子の死闘!!)	September 27, 1997
Katashira Reira gains control of Fuuko's body and begins to attack the other two. During this, Reira uses the moment to gain control of the boys. Stuck in her control, Reira tortures Fuuko with Primera until she begins to laugh. Fuuko learns the secret of the doll controller and stops her, ultimately defeating the duo. Kage Hoshi is then seen trying to convince Tokiya to assist Recca and company. Meanwhile, Kurei gives order to let loose a dangerous character that is locked up in a cage on the second floor.
9	"Devil Domon! Overwhelming Power!"; Transliteration: "Oni no Domon! Michinaru chikara!!" (Japanese: 鬼の土門!未知なる力!!)	October 4, 1997
The group goes up to the second floor with new friend Ganko to meet Seiko. Seiko who was locked up because he was too dangerous is now stopping our team from getting to the fourth floor where Yanagi is. Domon steps up to the challenge, and declares he'll face Seiko alone. Seiko is at first taken down, but after the use of his elemental weapon, creates a rock armor and pulverizes the group. It is then viewers learn that Domon is given Saturn's Ring from Kage Hoshi, and with its aid manages to defeat Seiko. As the episode closes, Tokiya makes his appearance at the mansion.
10	"The War of Flames! The Fight Between Hokage Descendants"; Transliteration: "Honō no gekitotsu! Futari no Hokage!!" (Japanese: 炎激突!!二人の火影!!)	October 11, 1997
Fuuko, Recca, and Domon are holding up a wall when Tokiya appears and taunts them. He destroys the wall and then begins to battle with Koganei who was waiting from the group on the third floor. Tokiya engages Koganei, and allows the rest of the group to run on to the fourth floor where they meet Kurei. After getting their attention, Kurei tells Recca about their past 400 years ago and how both were sent to the present time when they were infants.
11	"Adamantium Blade's Five Different Forms!"; Transliteration: "Kōgan Anki! Itsutsu no yaiba!!" (Japanese: 鋼金暗器!五つの刃!!)	October 18, 1997
Recca has a flashback to the past, caused by Kurei's revelation. He awakens to find that he, Fuuko, Domon and Ganko have fallen into Mokuren's lab, where plants attack. Meanwhile, Kogenai shows off the versatility of his Kōgan Anki weapon in a series of attacks against Tokiya. He disarms Tokiya, yet waits for him to retrieve his blade in an effort to show off all five forms. In the end, Tokiya uses a fake image of himself created with water to catch Kogenai off guard and win the battle. Back in the lab, the group encounters Mokuren, a psycho with the ability to manipulate plants. Recca bludgeons him with stereo equipmeny, and when Mokuren transforms, Recca sets him on fire, winning the battle. The group heads for the elevator, where Kurei is waiting in ambush.
12	"Kurenai, the Flame of the Angel of Death"; Transliteration: "Honō no Kurenai! Shi wo yobu tenshi!!" (Japanese: 炎の紅!死を呼ぶ天使!!)	October 25, 1997
Expecting the ambush from Kurei, Recca counters him with his own flames but still gets blasted back. Kurei is surprised that his flames were evenly countered by Recca. As Recca demands Kurei to return Yanagi to them, Kurei notices the scar on Reccas' face and reminisces that he was the one who gave Recca that scar when he was a child and that neither of them are people from the current time period. When Recca is not the least concerned about this, Kurei blames Recca for his bad luck since he was going to die by his hands now. Kurei materializes a raging fire being called Kurenai and commands it to attack Recca and his friends. After everyone scatters in order to avoid being hit by the flames, Kureis' eyes fall on Ganko. As punishment for Gankos' betrayal, Kurei directs Kurenai to kill Ganko. In the nick of time, Recca shields Ganko from the attack. Angered by Kureis' assault on Ganko, Recca unleashes an even powerful flame to stop Kurenai. Motivated by Recca, Fuko and Domon attack Kurenai with their weapons joined by Tokiya as well. Recca and the others decide to attack Kurei since he is the source of Kurenais' power but end up miscalculating his strength. They are all dealt with one by one by Kurei leaving Recca to be dealt by Kurenai. After all of them are defeated and at their wits end, Kagehoshi appears in front of them. She advises Recca to retreat but he doesn't agree. Kageroshi tells Recca to remove his gauntlet which is actually used to seal Reccas' full power to save him from harm. Recca is engulfed in his own flames and in immense pain as soon as he removes his gauntlet.
13	"The Ultimate Flame! Legend of the Fire Dragons"; Transliteration: "Kyūkyoku no honō! Densetsu no Karyū!!" (Japanese: 究極の炎!伝説の火竜!!)	November 1, 1997
After removing the gauntlet, an eight headed dragon appears from Reccas' flames. Everyone is astonished as Kagehoshi deems that it is the most powerful form of flame in history. Each head has its own savage consciousness and named Saiha, Nadare, Madoka, Rui, Homura, Koku, Setsuna and Resshin. Recca struggles immensely to gain control over the enormous power of his flames. One of the flame dragon heads, Resshin, is about to attack unconscious Yanagi when Recca fiercely commands it to stop or he would kill them all. Hearing this, Resshin warns Recca to watch his words but Recca is adamant to make them obey him. The angered dragons attack Recca and seeing him face them bravely without fleeing, Resshin offers to help Recca this one time in exchange for a price. Recca says that he is unable to forgive Kurei who kills women or children on a mere whim and asks Resshins' help to defeat Kurei in exchange for one of his arm. Resshin accepts and attacks Kurenai and Kurei. Even after being hit by Resshins' flame, Kurei manages to stand up. Looking unaffected Kurei attacks Recca intent on killing him and muses that once he dies the dragons may be plotting to use Kurei as their next host. At the same time, 4 people arrive in front of Kurei saying that they sensed disturbance in the mansion. Kurei introduces them as the assassin squad under his command, 'Uruha', with members Raiha, Neon, Jisho and Genjuro. Kurei further says that he will let go of Recca and the others along with Yanagi as a reward for entertaining him and will kill him for sure the next time they meet. As everyone is relieved and prepare to leave, they find Ganko beside Reccas' teacher who was also kidnapped. Ganko reveals that Koganei saved the teacher. Outside the mansion, Koganei meets up with Kurei and Uruha members only to inform them that he will not follow Kurei anymore since he betrayed his trust and hurt Yanagi. Kurei lets him off warning him that he will be given a brutal death the next time they meet.
14	"The Past is Brought Forward! The Truth of 400 Years Ago!"; Transliteration: "Yomigaeru kako! Yonhyakuen no shinjitsu!!" (Japanese: 蘇る過去!四百年の真実!!)	November 15, 1997
After rescuing Yanagi and destroying Kurei's mansion, Kage Hoshi invited Recca and his friends into her secret hideout carved in the face of a cliff. Kage Hoshi reveals to them that her real name is Kagero, and that she is Recca's true mother. While Recca refuses to believe, she tells all of them the truth of 400 years ago: Oka, the Hokage clan's leader and a flame master, had two sons: Recca with his wife Kagero, and Kurei with his mistress Reina, making Kurei and Recca half-brothers. Kurei, who exhibited flame powers as a child, was slated to inherit the clan leadership, but it was soon discovered that Recca also possessed the same powers. According to prophecy, only one member of the Hokage clan can use the powers of flame in each generation, and when there are two of them at the same time, one of them is bearing a cursed flame which can lead to the end of the clan's existence. The clan elders determined that Kurei was the one with the cursed flame, and sentenced him to death, but was spared upon Kagero's request. Meanwhile, while Kagero was telling them all of this, three members of the Uruha under Kurei's orders was spying on them, having discovered the hidden passageway towards the hideout, and was planning to attack them all unaware.
15	"The Curse that Separates Mother and Son"; Transliteration: "Toki no noroi! Haha to musuko!!" (Japanese: 時の呪い!母と息子!!)	November 22, 1997
Kagero continued on with her story: Kurei, in an attempt to please his mother who has fallen out of grace with the rest of the clan, tried to kill Recca, giving him the prominent scar on his cheek, but was stopped in time and was subsequently imprisoned. Meanwhile, the warlord Oda Nobunaga was preparing to attack the Hokage, with the hopes of stealing the Madogu and use their powers to conquer Japan. The Hokage clan, out of fear that the Madogu will fall into the wrong hands, decided to fight Nobunaga's soldiers without using them, but were overwhelmed by sheer numbers and were all defeated. Kagero, in a last desperate attempt to save her son, used a forbidden spell to open a time portal and send Recca into the future, at the cost of being immortal. However, Kurei, who was able to make his way out of his prison during the destruction of the village, found them and tried to get to Recca, and was sent into the future as well. Mikagami was able to sense the presence of the three interlopers while Kagero was telling her her story and they all proceeded to engage them in combat. It turns out however, that they are not able to use their Madogu well, and they were all able to defeat them quickly. One of them, however took Kagero hostage and was about to kill her (pointlessly, as she is immortal), but Recca was angered by this and unconsciously summoned Nadare, his first flame dragon, to defeat him. After the battle, Recca finally acknowledged Kagero as his mother and tried to check if she was alright, but found out that he is unable to touch her, as the forbidden spell that Kagero used ensured that mother and son cannot make contact.
16	"Determination to Fight! Recca's Challenge!"; Transliteration: "Tatakai no ketsui! Recca no chōsen!!" (Japanese: 戦いの決意!烈火の挑戦!!)	November 29, 1997
Recca, Domon, Fuko and Tokiya all decided to train during their summer break in case Kurei confronts them again later on. Before leaving, however, they decided to meet at Recca's house, where Recca introduced Kagero to his adoptive father and thanked him for looking after him for all those years. Yanagi, who was worried about Recca's safety, decided to accompany him in his training, much to his chagrin. Meanwhile, Fuko and Domon decided to train using the Madogu they acquired from the battle at Kagero's hideout. After a month, Recca was able to tame two of the flame dragons, while Mikagami, Fuko and Domon got more proficient in using their Madogu. Their reunion was interrupted however, by Genjuro and Jisho, who sent them an invitation from Kurei to join the Urabutou Satsujin, the most dangerous martial arts tournament in history.
17	"Hokage's Arrival! The Urubatousatsujin"; Transliteration: "Hokage kenzan! Ura Butou Satsujin!!" (Japanese: 火影見参!!裏武闘殺陣!!)	December 6, 1997
The Team Hokage decided to participate in the Urabutou Satsujin. Upon admission, however, they realized that they have to place a predetermined wager to enter the tournament, which turned out to be Yanagi, whom Koran Mori, the tournament organizer, wants because of her healing powers. Team Hokage was first hesitant, but Yanagi volunteered herself, saying that she trusts them all that they will not lose the tournament and let her fall into Koran Mori's hands. Before the tournament's opening ceremony, Recca decided to go out for some rest and fresh air. Outside, he met Kukai, a laid-back monk who is also participating in the tournament under Team Kuu.
18	"The Opening Battle! Mikagami's Sword"; Transliteration: "Shura no ken! Mikagami shutsujin!!" (Japanese: 修羅の剣!水鏡出陣!!)	December 13, 1997
The fight between Hokage and Kuu begins with the match between Daikoku and Mikagami. But before the match, Tokiya walked away from the ring to refuel his Ensui in a nearby fountain. He recalled what his master/grandfather, Meguri Kyoza taught him on how to use the Ice Crest Sword for revenge by saying the words, "The path of Revenge is hard road in life. This sword requires blood of its opponents and soon, you'll be covered in blood." When the match began, Tokiya began dodging Daikoku's staff attacks. The former also asked a logical question on how to stop a fan without turning off the switch and touching the blade. Near the end, Daikoku uses his bo's 1000-attack technique.
19	"Unexploded Iron Fist! Domon's Last Resort"; Transliteration: "Tekken fuhatsu?! Domon no kirifuda!!" (Japanese: 鉄拳不発?!土門の切り札!!)	December 20, 1997
The second part of Tokiya's match with Daikoku continues. In this episode, Recca explained what Tokiya really meant in the previous episode, by stopping the fan by pointing towards the center of the fan to stop rotating. Which Tokiya exactly did to Daikoku's bo which led to the Hokage fighter's victory. The next match is between Minamio (Kuu) and Domon Ishijima (Hokage). Domon began giving attention before the match which the audience find uninteresting such as making poses and carrying a radio as well as intentionally getting hit by Minamio. It is revealed that Minamio's body is made of rubber which is impervious to any attacks. The secret was a Madogu inside his mouth called, Nan which ability is mentioned earlier. Near the end of the bout, Domon used his Kuchibashi-oh which chains bound and defeated Minamio and emerged Domon victoriously. However, Tokiya said that Domon used the Madogu too late which made the latter fall unconscious as well despite saying "I won!" which resulted in a draw. The bout between Fujimaru and Fuuko begins. The episode ends with Fujimaru countering Fuuko's darts and starts throwing sickles at Fuuko stripping off her long sleeves.
20	"Secret of the Maiden's Skin"; Transliteration: "Bakuretsu!! Otome no hada no himitsu!!" (Japanese: 爆裂!!乙女の肌の秘密!!)	January 10, 1998
Fujimaru stripped Fuuko Kirisawa during the match and called her ugly. At the end of the match, Fuuko warned the audience if there is someone like Fujimaru, she would make their lives as a living hell. Later, Saicho apologized for Fujimaru's perverse behavior and gave a paper bandage to Fuuko's arm and give his jacket to her.
21	"Paper Dance! Breathing in Life!"; Transliteration: "Kami no mai! Fukikomareta inochi!!" (Japanese: 紙の舞!吹き込まれた命!!)	January 17, 1998
The match between Saicho and Recca begins. The former tells Hanabishi that he can only fight for 10 minutes since he had a heart condition (which revealed to be an injury caused by stabbing by one of the rebellious Kuu students). Throughout the fight, it is revealed that Saicho's Madogu, Shikigami (animator) can produce paper made of a magical barrier that cannot be easily burned. Some of the artworks made by the Kuu fighter include a deflecting force field (Nuno Zarashin), a paper sword (Kami No Ken) and as well as a crane of a thousand paper birds. In this bout, Saiha, the second flame dragon shows his true power in a form of a flame sword. At the end of the match, Recca challenged Kukai despite Hokage's victory.
22	"The Terrible Monster has Changed! Recca is in Danger!"; Transliteration: "Hotoke no hyōhen! Mō hitotsu no kao!!" (Japanese: 仏の豹変!もう一つの顔!!)	January 24, 1998
Recca challenges Kukai however, the referee protested since regardless of the result, Team Hokage still wins. However, Kouran Mori appears in the screen and decided to make some changes. He proposed that all of the previous fights will be discarded, and the winner of the match will advance in the next round. Recca provokingly accepts the proposal. During the fight, Kukai warned Recca that he only has to hit the Kuu master 3 times in any method, after which, it could mean certain death for Recca. Nobody was able to comprehend what Kukai really meant except Daikoku who had a flashback of what happens afterwards. But Recca was reluctant and attacked Kukai with Nadare. Kukai deflects the fireballs with his hands. However, he missed one. Recca has two hits left, so he decided to use Saiha against Kukai but avoids it. Recca kicks Kukai in the face but later gets up and laughs. Now the young ninja only has one strike left. This time, Kukai will not move. If Recca knocks Kukai out, he wins. But if Kukai still has the strength to fight, Recca dies. Daikoku warns Recca not to do it, but Hanabishi was still persistent and gave Kukai a mighty punch. Kukai gets up and activates his madogu, Oni, a demonic necklace that activates after the user is hit three times, turning the possessor in to a perfect killing machine. Both Kagero and Genjuro explained this fact. Kukai began beating Recca up badly. Minamio, who was shocked told his teammates that everybody has a lust for killing just like everybody else, even a gentle and serene teacher like Kukai. He also told that the Urabutousatsoujin is based on killing as a sport. In the end of the episode, Kukai prepares to smash Recca's head.
23	"Trial of Life and Death!/The Life-staking Test"; Transliteration: "Inochigake no shiren!!" (Japanese: 命がけの試練!!)	January 31, 1998
Kukai teaches Recca the true meaning of life and death during a battle. Near the end, Homura appears to Recca which led to Hokage's victory over Kuu as well as Kukai returning to his gentle normal self. It is revealed that despite in demonic state, Kukai was still aware of his actions. He admitted to his teammates that Recca was too tough for him and he almost killed Hanabishi the last time.
24	"The Call from the Monster, the Warrior from Hell"; Transliteration: "Kemono no otakebi jigoku no senshi!!" (Japanese: 獣の雄叫び 地獄の戦士!!)	February 7, 1998
Koganei joins the Hokage team after learning that they do not have enough members. Fuuko and Domon were fallen by Kurei's trap.
25	"What an Attack! The Lightning Battle"; Transliteration: "Shōgeki!! Denkōsekka no ketchaku!!" (Japanese: 衝撃!!電光石火の決着!!)	February 14, 1998
After Koganei defeats Shiju, Genjuro suggested to change the format of Round 2 to single elimination with the loser being eliminated and the winner proceeds to the next fight. The next opponent for Uruha Illusion is Maboroshi X who is later revealed to be Mokuren. During the fight, Mokuren used false words of compassion to trick Koganei by gradually transforming into a human tree. The episode ends with Mokuren saying that he will use Koganei as a fertilizer for his human-faced tree.
26	"Mokuren has Returned! The Danger of the Human Tree"; Transliteration: "Fukkatsu no Mokuren! Jimmen ju no kyōi!!" (Japanese: 復活の木蓮!!人面樹の驚異!!)	February 21, 1998
The episode begins with Koganei about to be absorbed by Mokuren. The former eventually accepted defeat. Recca was about to fight Mokuren but Kagero asks that if Recca fights Mokuren, what will happen to Koganei? Mokuren will be burned alongside Koganei who was inside the human tree. So Tokiya decided to fight Mokuren. During the fight, Mokuren's branches grow after being cut by Tokiya. Kagero revealed that the source of Mokuren's power comes from the Kodama madogu implanted in Mokuren's face. Near the end of the fight, Tokiya pierces his sword to the ground where Mokuren interpreted it as an act of submission. In reality, he froze the entire ring to freeze Mokuren as well. He eventually finds and rescues Koganei due to the fact of heat conductivity where metals react first in freezing temperatures (which in this case, Koganei's golden cross gave Tokiya the signal of the former's location). Tokiya emerged victorious
27	"The Reason for her Tear! The Girl with the Hairblade!"; Transliteration: "Namida no wake midaregami no bishōjo!!" (Japanese: 涙の訳 乱れ髪の美少女!!)	February 28, 1998
Mikagami was supposed to fight Menou, a school girl, but forfeited due to the injuries caused by Mokuren. So Recca fights Menou who also wields an implanted Shikigami in Menou's hair. Saicho, who also uses a Shikigami also explains that despite having the same name, they have different abilities. Saicho's madogu (made by Koku) is used to animate paper objects. While that of Menou (made by Kaima) is implanted and uses the user's hair as a deadly weapon. Near the end of the episode, it is revealed that Genjuro was behind the trapping of Menou's father so Recca and Menou teamed up to defeat Genjuro to save Menou's father. Recca manages to do so and Menou accepts defeat. At the end of the match, Recca finally gets to face Genjuro.
28	"The Instantaneous Flame, the Flame of Setsuna/Scorching Glance! Setsuna's Incineration!"; Transliteration: "Shakunetsu no gankō Setsuna no Shun En honō!!" (Japanese: 灼熱の眼光 刹那の瞬炎!!)	March 7, 1998
Recca faces Genjuro into a fight after defeating Meno Sakura. During the match it is revealed that Genjuro first used the illusion technique that Kurei used. At the end of the fight, Genjuro angered Setsuna, the 4th Dragon who burned him alive.
29	"Dangerous Lips! The Madougu of Speech!/Dangerous Lips! Terror of the Kotodama!"; Transliteration: "Ayashī no kuchibiru! Kotodama no kyōfu!!" (Japanese: 妖しい唇 言霊の恐怖!!)	March 14, 1998
Team Hokage faces the beautiful but deadly Uruha Sound/Oto. In the first match, Domon Ishijima faces illusionist Aki who uses the madogu Kotodama which enables the user to create illusions that only the opponent can see. The illusions include Aki stripping, a giant snake, snowy weather, flower (which is really Aki striking a dueling sword and flames all over Domon. Mikagami tried to stop Domon's match but is prevented by Recca which led the two men having a rift. Luckily, with his mental fortitude, Domon was able to repel the Kotodama's spell and emerged victorious. Mikagami objected Recca's happiness for Domon's win because he almost let Domon die which made the conflict worse. At the end of the fight, Neon called a double bout (i.e. 2 vs. 2 Neon and Miki vs. Recca and Mikagami)
30	"The Seduction of the Beautiful. Dangerous Duet!/Seduction of the Beauties: Double-play of Death"; Transliteration: "Bijo no yūwaku, shi no nijūsō!!" (Japanese: 美女の誘惑 死の二重奏!!)	March 21, 1998
Team Hokage agreed to Neon's suggestion in having a double bout since if Team Hokage loses the next 2 matches, Fuuko Kirisawa will win by default and the match will end in a tie. During the fight, Recca and Mikagami had a rift because of Domon who later intervened during the match and stopped the argument but ended up losing his win against Aki. The duo worked together to win and defeated Miki. Neon then released the sealed energy from her madogu the Fukyo Waon and tried to play the last tune, the Requiem (song for the dead)
31	"The Cursed Flame! Kurenai's Past!!/Cursed Fire! Kurenai's Past"; Transliteration: "Noro wa reshi honō Kurenai no kako!!" (Japanese: 呪われし炎 「紅」の過去!!)	March 28, 1998
Recca asked Neon why was she protecting Kurei despite being a merciless killer. Neon told a story about Kurei's sad past and why Neon became a Jyuushinju. Recca tried to summon Madoka, the barrier dragon and try to save Neon despite being their enemy.
32	"The Invisible Enemy! A Horrible Battle/Invisible Foe! The Battle Against Fear"; Transliteration: "Mienai teki kyōfuto no tatakai!!" (Japanese: 見えない敵 恐怖との戦い!!)	April 17, 1998
Team Hokage automatically advances to the semi-finals after learning that their opponent dropped from the quarter-finals due to severe injuries in their last bout. Under the suggestion of Tokiya, the team watch the quarter match of their possible opponents, Uruha Ma (Uruha Magic) and Uruha Kurogane (Uruha Iron). During the match, The former's team leader, Magensha kills the Jyushinshuu Jisho by using the Homashin Madogu (Demon Cannon) which leads to Uruha Ma pitting against Team Hokage. In the first match, Koganei faces Tsukishiro, who uses two madogus the Kaigetsu and the Oboro (Hazy Moon). Koganei figured out the Oboro's weakness by following the trail of blood and defeated Tsukishiro, but due to fatal wounds caused during the fight, Koganei lost consciousness and the match ended in a draw.
33	"Two Dragons! The Stolen Move!/Two Fire Dragons! A Stolen Technique!"; Transliteration: "Nihiki no karyū!! Nusumareta waza!!" (Japanese: 二匹の火竜!!盗まれた技!!)	April 24, 1998
Recca faces the copycat ninja Kashamaru who wielded the madogu Nisebi (Fake Flame). During the fight, Recca was given a riddle by Rui (One of the Karyu) and was able to solve her riddle and created fog illusions (in the forms of Gashakura, Jisho and Kashamaru) against the Uruha Ma ninja. Recca emerged victorious. Tsukishiro and Kashamaru are then sent to the Majigen dimension. Recca was supposed to fight Gashakura who stated that Kashamaru applied sleeping potions to all his weapons. The episode ends with Fuuko ready to face Gashakura
34	"Skin Covered in Bruises! Fuko's Tough Fight!"; Transliteration: "Gekitō Fūko!! Kizudarake no suhada!!" (Japanese: 激闘風子!!傷だらけの素肌!!)	May 1, 1998
Fuuko Kirisawa faces Uruha Ma's second-in-command, Gashakura. During the match, Kouran Mori interfered and set a laser in the ring's corners where Fuuko was hit twice
35	"Answer to a Maiden's Prayer! The True Power of Fujin"; Transliteration: "Otome no inori mezameta Fūjin!!" (Japanese: 乙女の祈り 目覚めた風神!!)	May 8, 1998
The true form of Fuujin is revealed and it is a cute little fox. Later, Fuuko challenges Magensha but ended up getting sucked in the Majigen
36	"The Fire Dragons United! The Enemy Outside the Ring!"; Transliteration: "Karyū gattai!! RING gai no teki!!" (Japanese: 火竜合体!!リング外の敵!!)	May 15, 1998
An evil presence is stalking Yanagi, and he is another Magensha who is later revealed to be a fake.
37	"Escape from the Oblivious Dimension! The Battle of the Other Place!"; Transliteration: "Ma jigen dasshutsu!! Akūkan no tatakai!!" (Japanese: 魔次元脱出!!亜空間の戦い!!)	May 22, 1998
Fuuko, Tsukishiro and Kashamaru tried to escape from the Majigen dimension and eventually found the real Magensha and Domon won the match. In the second part of the semi-finals, Raiha, who was supposed to fight Kurei withdrew.
38	"Horror! The Walking Corpse"; Transliteration: "Kyōfu!! Yomigaetta shisha no nikutai!!" (Japanese: 恐怖!!蘇った死者の肉体!!)	May 29, 1998
Domon faces Noroi, a ghost that haunts the Bakuju madogu. Noroi tried to invade Domon's mind and body but thanks to Domon's strong spiritual capacity, he was able to repel the Bakuju's spell and emerged victorious. And at the end of the match, Kurei appeared.
39	"Mikagami Battles. Desperate Ice Sword!"; Transliteration: "Mikagami shitō!! Kesshi no Hyōmon Ken!!" (Japanese: 水鏡死闘!!決死の氷紋剣!!)	June 12, 1998
Mikagami battles Kai who is suspected to be the murderer of Mifuyu. Kai was able to defeat Mikagami. But despite this, Kai declared that Mikagami was the rightful heir of the Hyomon Ken (Ice Crest Sword). And before he died, Kai revealed that the murderer of Mifuyu was their sensei and Tokiya's grandfather, Meguri Kyoza (In the manga, two men hired by Kurei were the true killers and Meguri arrive too late and blamed himself for Mifuyu's death. Also, Kai stabbed himself with the Hyoma En in the manga after the match). At the same time, Recca learned that the 8 Flame Dragons were Hokage ancestors and was forced to fight them again to regain their powers.
40	"Trap of the Evil Woman. The God of Wind is Furious!/Trap, the Angry Fuujin"; Transliteration: "Akujo no wana!! Ikari no Fūjin!!" (Japanese: 悪女の罠!!怒りの風神!!)	June 19, 1998
Recca faces the last Karyu in the desert, Setsuna and the old man reveals himself to be the 7th dragon, Koku. Back at the arena, Fuuko fights Mikoto, in order to avenge a little boy's father's death by her (Mikoto). During the fight, the Mikoto Fuuko was fighting was actually a robot. The real Mikoto appeared and later abused the referee who accused her of cheating because her madogu takes human form. Fuuko was eventually poisoned by the Dokumashin, a poisonous nail that contains the poisons from all over the world. Mikoto too was poisoned in order to release the Gendokugan (the antidote). Fuuko took one dose but was eventually defeated since Domon interfered. Back at the desert, Recca fights Koku and told Recca to combine the dragons just as he (Recca) fought Magensha. However, there are rules to be honored to successfully summon composite dragons.
41	"Fight Again! Recca & Kurei/Second Reckoning! Recca & Kurei"; Transliteration: "Taiketsu futatabi!! Recca to Kurei!!" (Japanese: 対決再び!!烈火と紅麗!!)	July 3, 1998
Koganei's fight with the Joker begins but the Joker gives up so Kurei can fight Recca. With Recca still not back from training the others battle Kurei four on one. Recca appears just in time to save Koganei. Recca and Kurei finally begin their fight. During the fight Recca simultaneously summoned all 7 dragons in order for Resshin, the 8th dragon to appear. But it turned out to be a whammy since he came to bear witness the fight between Recca and Kurei.
42	"The Deadly Battle! When the Candle of Life Burns out." Transliteration: "Shitō!! Inochimo e tsukiru made!!" (Japanese: 死闘!!命燃え尽きるまで!!)	July 10, 1998
After Kurenai has been extinguished, Kurei unleashed his powerful flame, the Sacred Flame Ho-Oh (Phoenix). Resshin recalled that the Sacred Flames caused Kurei's harsh fate. It is revealed that Resshin was a spirit of Recca and Kurei's real father, Oka. During the end of the fight, Kouran Mori appeared with a puppet Kurei. Recca and Kurei faced the puppet and Resshin finally joins them to destroy the puppet. At the end, Recca emerges victorious.
