= A (1965 film) =

1965 film by Jan Lenica

- Directed by: Jan Lenica
- Written by: Jan Lenica
- Produced by: Boris von Borresholm
- Cinematography: Georges Maillet; Renate Ruhr
- Edited by: Renate Ruhr
- Music by: Georges Delerue; Bernard Parmegiani
- Production company: Film Boris von Borrisholm
- Distributed by: Alpha Film Group; Atlas Film
- Release date: 1 February 1965
- Running time: 9 minutes 57 seconds
- Country: West Germany
- Language: French

A is a 1965 short film animated by Jan Lenica.

== Summary ==
It involves a writer tormented by a giant letter "A". He frees himself from the "A" only to encounter a "B".

== Background ==
Production began in late 1964, and the film premiered at the Oberhausen Film Festival in February 1965. It was considered lost until it was found as a part of a 1973 episode of Screening Room and uploaded to YouTube in 2016. A quotation by Eugène Ionesco is featured at the end of the film.
