= 10+2 (TV series) =

- Genre: Animation Children's television series
- Written by: Miquel Pujol
- Directed by: Miquel Pujol
- Theme music composer: Manel Gil-Inglada; Rudy Gnutti
- Composers: Manel Gil-Inglada; Rudy Gnutti
- Country of origin: Spain
- Original languages: Catalan; English
- No. of episodes: 52

Production
- Executive producers: Jordi Castelltort; Hilari Pujol
- Producers: Accio; Victory Media Group
- Running time: 13 minutes

Original release
- Network: Televisió de Catalunya
- Release: September 16, 1991 – January 21, 2004

10+2 is a children's animated television series from Catalonia, Spain, produced by Accio Studios and Victory Media Group and directed by Miquel Pujol i Lozano. The show debuted in September 16, 1991 and ended in January 21, 2004.

== Summary ==
The series takes place in the fictional country of Numberland, centered in a school taught by the teacher Aristotle and his assistant Infinite. The students consist of ten living numbers from zero till nine, each with different personalities. The characters are mute and only communicate in vocal noises and body language. Throughout the episode, every night, Aristotle would narrate the day's events in a flashback, with moments of counting quantities corresponding to the number characters. However, in the movies, the characters have full speech.

== Characters ==
=== Original characters ===
- Professor Aristotle – The mouse teacher of Numberland, named after Aristotle. He's quite firm and serious.
- Infinite – Aristotle's young assistant, also a mouse. He's very helpful towards others, and he's also known as Monty in the English dub.
- Cuco – A yellow cuckoo bird who lives in the classroom clock.
- Zero – A mischievous, disobedient sort.
- One – A forgetful sort who likes to keep appearances. Because of that, he's always seen wearing a blue bow-tie.
- Two – A sort who has a love for water and sailing.
- Three – A cross, grumpy sort.
- Four – A lazy sort who loves to doze off.
- Five – A prone-to-misfortune sort who runs into trouble often.
- Six – A neat, tidy busybody who loves gardering.
- Seven – An athletic, active sort.
- Eight – A greedy sort who likes eating cakes and sweets.
- Nine – An experimental, scientific sort.

=== Movie-exclusive characters ===
- Milesima – Aristotle's and Elenica's red-haired niece. She's very playful and carefree, and she fancies herself as a pirate.
- Miss Zenobia – The mouse substitute teacher. She's a very bossy, mean sort, far more strict than Aristotle.
- Mr. Postman – A white pigeon with pilot goggles who grudgingly delivers letters around Numberland and occasionally does rescuing when needed.
- Doctor – An owl who wears a green suit and gives medical advice.

== Episodes ==
=== Season 1 (1991–92) ===
No.	Title	Original release date
1	"Anem a l'escola / Come to School"	September 16, 1991
Infinite and Zero get stranded on the school roof as they recover One's ball.
2	"L'U fa tard / One comes Afternoon"	September 17, 1991
One is late for the school photo shoot, so Infinite finds and brings him.
3	"El Dos i les bombolles / The Two and the Bubbles"	September 18, 1991
Two plays with his bubble flute and shows it off at school fascinating the pupils, Infinite and Aristotle.
4	"El Tres rondinaire / The Three Grouch"	September 19, 1991
Aristotle tells a grumpy Three his take on the story of "The Three Bears".
5	"El quatre mandrós / The Four Sloth"	September 20, 1991
Four's laziness and his dilapidated house cause problems for Infinite.
6	"El Cinc i la pluja / Five and Rain"	March 23, 1992
An accident by Five causes a faucet to break and Infinite to unsuccessfully fix it.
7	"El Zero trapella / Zero naughty"	March 24, 1992
Infinite and a squirrel get even with Zero, One and Two for playing a prank on them.
8	"El Sis i el regal / Six and Gift"	March 25, 1992
Infinite and Six get Aristotle an ideal birthday present, but a caterpillar eats it.
9	"El Set i els esports / Seven and sports"	March 26, 1992
Infinite and Seven have misadventures with a porcupine and get caught in a storm.
10	"El Vuit golafre / Eight Glutton"	March 27, 1992
Eight greedily eats all the hot chocolate drink, but Aristotle thinks it was Infinite.
11	"El nou i el rellotge / The Nine and the Clock"	March 30, 1992
Infinite accidentally breaks Cuco's clock and goes to Nine to get it fixed.
12	"Acampada / Camping"	March 31, 1992
During a camping trip, Zero gets stuck in a hole. After a rescue, the entire class gets lost in thick fog.
13	"Fi de curs / End of Course"	April 1, 1992
The school celebrates and Infinite tries to keep the fireworks safe.

=== Season 2 (1998) ===
No.	Title	Original release date
14	"Una visita inesperada"	June 8, 1998
Infinite looks reminisces his past events in a photo album. Aristotle receives a letter that his niece Milesima is coming.
15	"Una nit moguda"	June 9, 1998
Infinite, Cuco and Aristotle work hard to prepare for Milesima's arrival.
16	"El tren de les deu i dos"	June 10, 1998
That Sunday morning everyone was busy searching for the most appropriate gift to welcome the new student: Milesima.
17	"Misteri a l'estació"	June 11, 1998
Milesima's train has arrived, but Milesima is gone. Aristotle strains his legs trying to find her.
18	"Els problemes d'Aristòtil"	June 12, 1998
Infinite drives Aristotle home and later Milesima arrives having come back from a trip with Two.
19	"El secret de l'Infinit"	June 15, 1998
Infinite stumbles across a secret passage leading to a mysterious locked door.
20	"Mil·lèsima"	June 16, 1998
Infinite tries to befriend Milesima while she plays at being a pirate.
21	"La carta dels conflictes"	June 17, 1998
Infinite and Milesima chase after an important letter.
22	"Accident"	June 18, 1998
Infinite falls into a river but is rescued by Mr. Postman.
23	"La incorregible Mil·lèsima"	June 19, 1998
Milesima finds a mysterious key and she and all the numbers try to make Infinite feel better.
24	"Una història de pirates"	June 22, 1998
In the morning, everyone went to visit Infinite, who was recovering from a river accident. Milesima took the opportunity to tell an interesting pirate story.
25	"La història continua"	June 23, 1998
Milesima tells Infinite a pirate story about Captain Red Braid on a treasure hunt.
26	"El fi i el principi"	June 24, 1998
Infinite shares his secret with Milesima, while Aristotle reveals a substitute teacher is coming.

=== Season 3 (2003–04) ===
No.	Title	Original release date
27	"Zenòbia"	May 26, 2003
The new substitute teacher Zenobia arrives, but she is pretty unpleasant towards Milesima and Infinite.
28	"El primer dia d'escola"	May 27, 2003
29	"El gran descobriment"	May 28, 2003
30	"El comiat"	May 29, 2003
31	"Al final del dia"	May 30, 2003
32	"El corc"	June 2, 2003
33	"El cuco aventurer"	June 3, 2003
34	"Classe de ciències"	June 4, 2003
35	"El cuco enamorat"	June 5, 2003
36	"L'ocell golafre"	June 6, 2003
37	"L'avió del Nou"	June 9, 2003
38	"L'estel"	June 10, 2003
39	"Gimnàstica per a tothom"	June 11, 2003
40	"Cap de roca"	January 5, 2004
41	"Simplement màgia"	January 6, 2004
42	"El despertador"	January 7, 2004
43	"Les angúnies d'una casa"	January 8, 2004
44	"Un pícnic accidentat"	January 9, 2004
45	"Trucs de màgia"	January 12, 2004
46	"Dia de platja"	January 13, 2004
47	"Treball en equip"	January 14, 2004
48	"Zero en matemàtiques"	January 15, 2004
Zero seems to be a failure at maths, but dreams a valuable lesson on naughts.
49	"Unes vambes d'altura"	January 16, 2004
50	"Un treball màgic"	January 19, 2004
51	"Nit de disfresses"	January 20, 2004
52	"Ninots de neu"	January 21, 2004

== Movies ==
=== The Magical Night ===
In 2000, Miquel Pujol created a 45-minute Christmas Special movie titled 10+2: La Nit Màgica, where Infinite goes on a winter adventure after an embarrassing moment during Christmas preparations.

=== The Great Secret ===
In 2001, Miquel Pujol created an 85-minute movie titled 10+2: El Gran Secreto starring Milesima and the new teacher Zenobia. It was nominated in the fifteenth edition of the Goya Awards in the category of best animated film.

=== Letters and Pirates ===
In 2005, a 47-minute movie was made titled 10+2: Cartes i Pirates, where Milesima as Captain Red Braid takes Infinite and the ten numbers on pirate voyage to find the treasure trove of Rocky Head Island.
