= Ubu et la Grande Gidouille =

- Directed by: Jan Lenica
- Written by: Jan Lenica; Alfred Jarry (play)
- Starring: Michel Poujade; Janine Grillon
- Cinematography: Julien Pappé
- Edited by: Chantal Rémy
- Music by: Jean-Claude Dequéant
- Production company: Les Films Armorial
- Distributed by: Les Films de l'Atalante
- Release dates: 1979; 11 November 1987
- Running time: 80 minutes
- Country: France
- Language: French

Ubu and the Great Gidouille (Ubu et la Grande Gidouille) is a 1979 French animated film directed by Jan Lenica. It is based on Alfred Jarry's play Ubu Roi. The film was re-released on 11 November 1987 in France, and had previously aired in English on BBC Two. Michel Poujade (voice of Père Ubu) and Janine Grillon (voice of Mère Ubu) were the main actors. Les Films Armorial was the production company of the film.
