= Hannes Hegen =

German Illustrator and caricaturist (1925–2014)

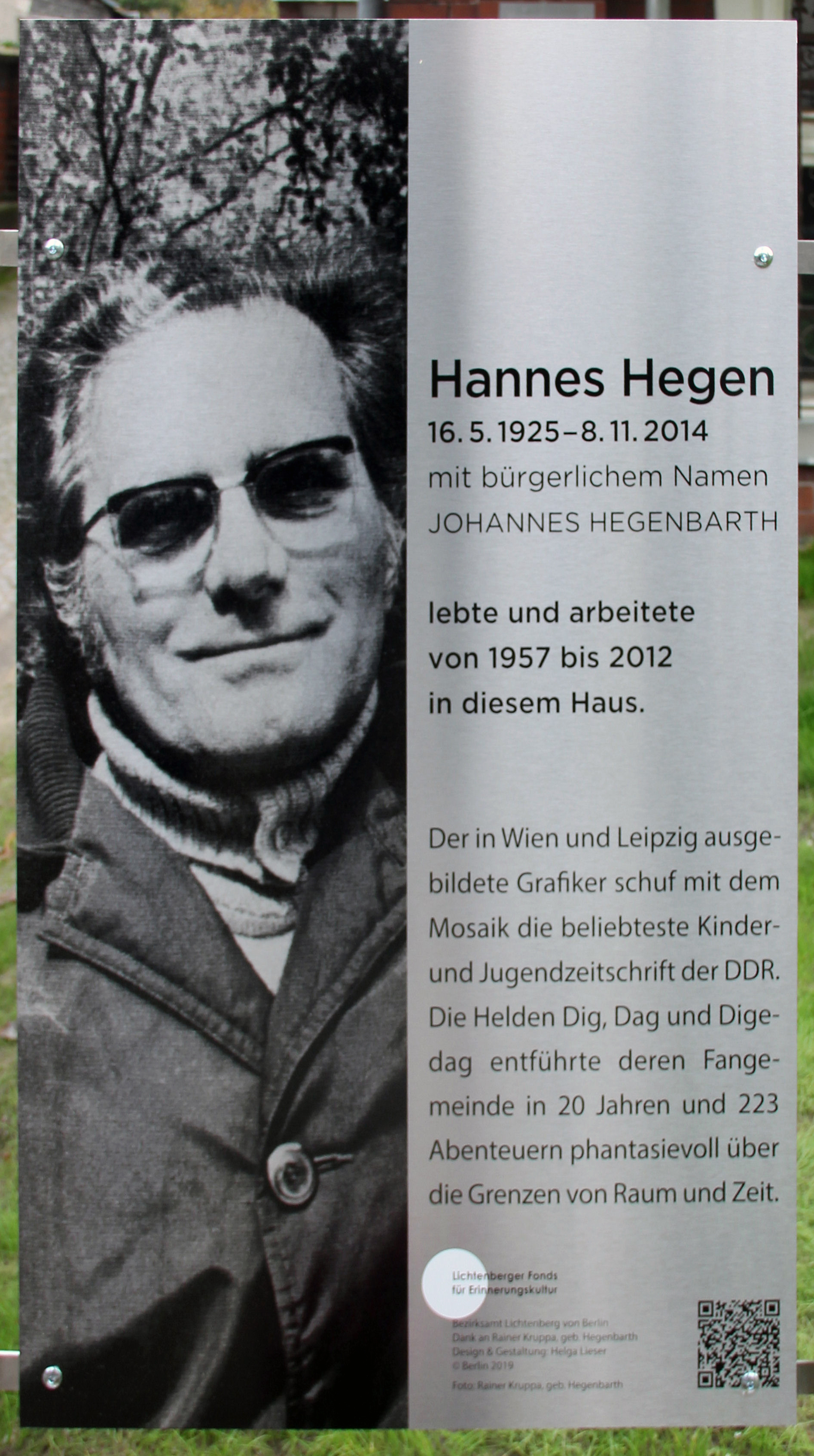
Plaque on the house of Hannes Hegen in Berlin-Karlshorst

Autograph by Hannes Hegen

Hannes Hegen (real name Johannes Eduard Hegenbarth; 16 May 1925 – 8 November 2014) was a German illustrator and caricaturist and is most famous for creating the East German comic book Mosaik and its original protagonists, the Digedags.

== Biography ==
Hegen was born in Böhmisch Kamnitz, now Česká Kamenice. He studied at the University of Applied Arts Vienna and at the Academy of Visual Arts Leipzig. After his studies, he worked in Berlin, illustrating several magazines.

His own creation Mosaik was first published in December 1955. Hegen was solely responsible for only the first issues of the book. Later a team of artists and writers worked on the book, but only Hegen was credited on the cover. 223 issues were produced. Hegen worked on Mosaik until 1975, when he had a disagreement with the publisher and quit working, taking the rights to the Digedags characters with him. The Mosaik team continued without him and created new characters to appear in Mosaik.

Hegen died in Berlin, aged 89, still working on reprint and book editions for the original Mosaik comics.

In 2008 Hannes Hegen received the Max & Moritz Prize, the most important German prize for comic artists from the International Comic Salon Erlangen. In 2010 he was awarded for his creative work, the Order of Merit of the Federal Republic of Germany (Knight's Cross, or Merit Cross on Ribbon, German: Verdienstkreuz am Bande).

== Books ==
- Reiner Grünberg; Michael Hebestreit: MOSAIK-Handbuch. Die Welt der Digedags. Lehmstedt Verlag, Leipzig 2012, ISBN 978-3-942473-22-4.
- Mark Lehmstedt: Die geheime Geschichte der Digedags. Die Publikations- und Zensurgeschichte des Mosaik von Hannes Hegen. Lehmstedt Verlag, Leipzig 2010, ISBN 978-3-937146-99-7.
- Matthias Friske: Die Geschichte des „MOSAIK von Hannes Hegen“. Eine Comic-Legende in der DDR. Lukas-Verlag, Berlin 2008, ISBN 978-3-86732-034-4.
- Michael F. Scholz: Mosaik. Die ersten Jahre. in Eckart Sackmann: Deutsche Comicforschung. Vol. 2, Verlag Sackmann und Hörndl, Hildesheim 2005, pages 102–111.
- Harry Ralf Herrling (2024). Hannes Hegen und Josef Hegenbarth. Comic Legende und Meister der Illustration (in German). Dresden: Mosamax. p. 626. ISBN 978-3-9817140-2-9.
