= Kaze no Yojimbo =

Anime television series

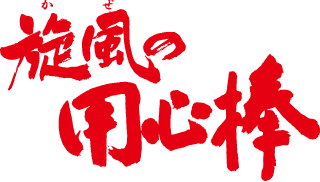

旋風の用心棒
- Created by: Kurosawa Production
- Anime television series
- Directed by: Hayato Date
- Produced by: Yuji Nunokawa; Hiroshi Yamashita; Tetsuya Watanabe
- Written by: Katsuyuki Sumisawa
- Music by: Tsuneyoshi Saito
- Studio: Studio Pierrot
- Licensed by: NA: Bandai Entertainment
- Original network: Nippon TV
- Original run: 2 October 2001 – 19 March 2002
- Episodes: 25

Kaze no Yojimbo (旋風の用心棒; trans. "Bodyguard of the Wind") is a 2001–2002 Japanese animated television series based on Akira Kurosawa's chanbara film Yojimbo. It was directed by Hayato Date.

The series follows George Kodama into the small town of Kimujuku. The wanderer quickly realizes he is an unwelcomed visitor and becomes caught up in a violent conflict between rival crime syndicates.

Kaze no Yojimbo aired on Nippon Television from 2 October 2001 to 19 March 2002, totaling 25 episodes.

== Plot ==
Jyouji "George" Kodama arrives in the town of Kimujuku in search of a man named Genzo Araki. Unable to find him, he learns that the town is divided in two distinct factions. Sensing that Kimujuku's residents are hiding something, Jyouji takes work from each faction, playing them against each other in an effort to uncover the secret and the whereabouts of Genzo.

== Episode list ==
No.	Title	Original air date
1	"Gone With the Dust"; Transliteration: "Sajin no Tomoni..." (Japanese: 砂塵と共に…)	2 October 2001
2	"Snake Swamp"; Transliteration: "Akai Hebinuma" (Japanese: 赤い蛇沼)	9 October 2001
3	"The Bodyguard"; Transliteration: "Bodigādo" (Japanese: ボディガード)	16 October 2001
4	"Beauty and the Poison"; Transliteration: "Hana to Dokumushi" (Japanese: 花と毒虫)	23 October 2001
5	"The Pursuit"; Transliteration: "Tsuiseki" (Japanese: 追跡)	30 October 2001
6	"The Gate Wouldn't Rise"; Transliteration: "Agaranai Fumikiri" (Japanese: 上がらない踏み切り)	6 November 2001
7	"Legend of the Demon"; Transliteration: "Oni no Densetsu" (Japanese: 鬼の伝説)	13 November 2001
8	"The Casino Train"; Transliteration: "Kajino Ressha" (Japanese: カジノ列車)	20 November 2001
9	"The 15-Year Truth"; Transliteration: "15-nen-me no Shinjitsu" (Japanese: 15年目の真実)	27 November 2001
10	"Red Dreams, White Memories"; Transliteration: "Akai Yume Shiori Kioku" (Japanese: 赤い夢 白い記憶)	4 December 2001
11	"Lurking in the Gloom"; Transliteration: "Yami ni Ugomeku" (Japanese: 闇に蠢く)	11 December 2001
12	"The Echo"; Transliteration: "Zankyō" (Japanese: 残響)	18 December 2001
13	"The Man Who Returned"; Transliteration: "Kattekita Otoko" (Japanese: 帰ってきた男)	25 December 2001
14	"False Reconciliations"; Transliteration: "Itsuwari no Wakai" (Japanese: 偽りの和解)	1 January 2002
15	"The Counter Attack"; Transliteration: "Hangeki" (Japanese: 反撃)	8 January 2002
16	"Swapping Hostages"; Transliteration: "Hitojichi Kōkan" (Japanese: 人質交換)	15 January 2002
17	"The Great Sting"; Transliteration: "Dai Sōsaku" (Japanese: 大捜索)	22 January 2002
18	"The Vendetta"; Transliteration: "Kōsō" (Japanese: 抗争)	29 January 2002
19	"The Sniper"; Transliteration: "Sunaipa" (Japanese: スナイパー)	5 February 2002
20	"Bingo" (Japanese: BINGO!)	12 February 2002
21	"The Search for the Truth"; Transliteration: "Shinjitsu no Yukue" (Japanese: 真実の行方)	19 February 2002
22	"The Tanokura Manor Ablaze"; Transliteration: "Tanokura-tei Enjō" (Japanese: 田野倉邸炎上)	26 February 2002
23	"The Great Excursion"; Transliteration: "Dai Bōsō" (Japanese: 大暴走)	3 March 2002
24	"The Close Call"; Transliteration: "Kiki Ippatsu!" (Japanese: 危機一発!)	12 March 2002
25	"So Long"; Transliteration: "Aba yo" (Japanese: あばよ)	19 March 2002
