= Jan Lenica =

Polish graphic designer and cartoonist (1928–2001)

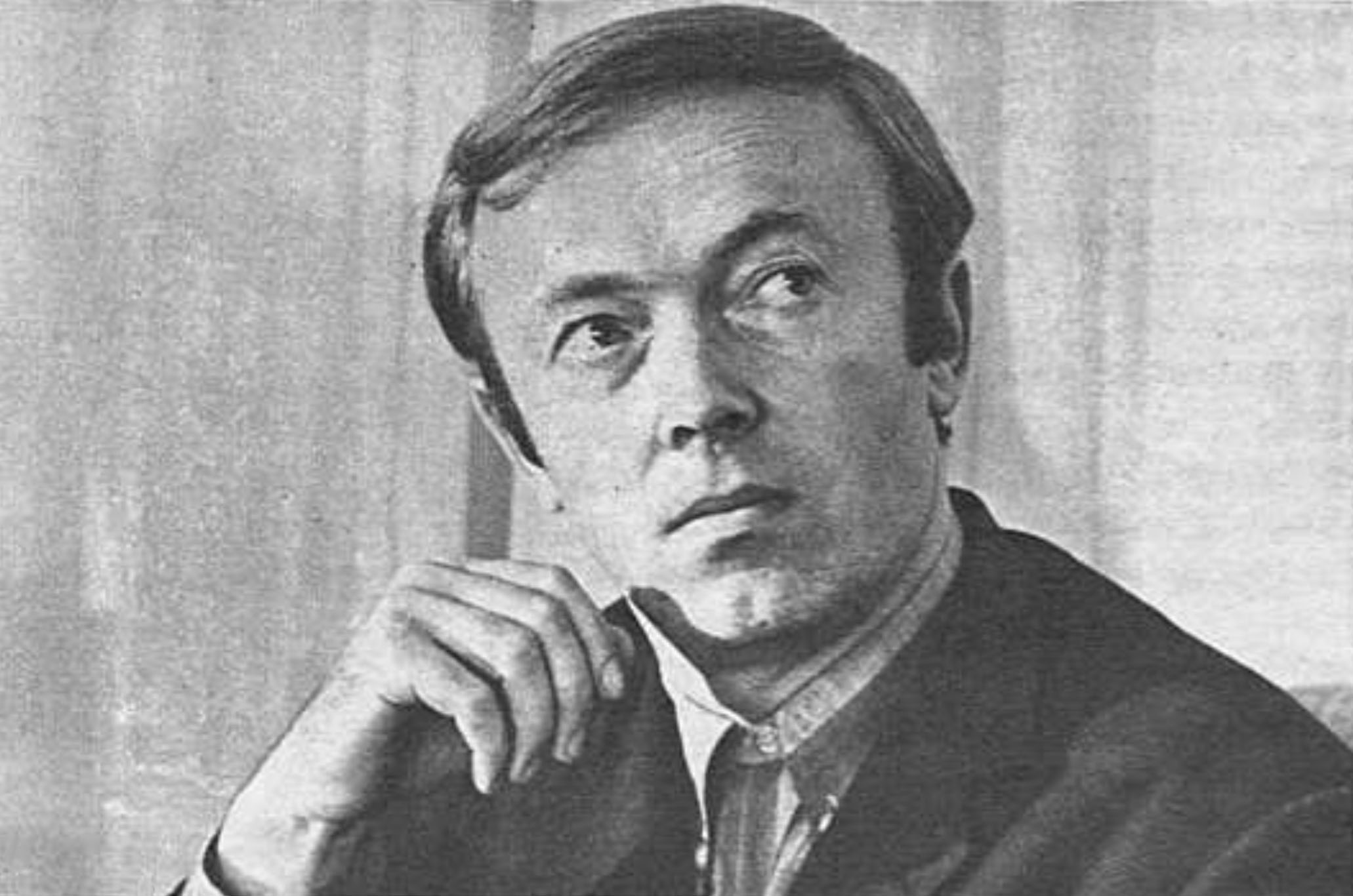
- Lenica in 1967
- Born: 4 January 1928; Poznań, Poland
- Died: 5 October 2001 (aged 73); Berlin, Germany
- Education: Warsaw Polytechnic
- Occupations: Graphic designer Cartoonist
- Known for: Poster design
- Spouse(s): Teresa Byszewska; Merja Alanen
- Children: Anneli; Maia

Jan Lenica (January 4, 1928 – October 5, 2001) was a Polish graphic designer and cartoonist.

== Biography ==
A graduate of the Architecture Department of Warsaw Polytechnic, Lenica became a poster illustrator and a collaborator on the early animation films of Walerian Borowczyk. From 1963 to 1986, he lived and worked in France, while from 1987 he lived and worked in Berlin. He was a professor of graphic, poster, animated cartoon for many years at German high schools and the first professor of the animation class at the University of Kassel, Germany, in 1979. He used cut-out stop motion animation in his numerous films, which included two features: Adam 2 (1968) and Ubu et la grande gidouille (1976, but released in France only in 1979).

== Major awards ==
- 1960 - Nominated for a BAFTA Film Award for Dom. Shared with Polish Walerian Borowczyk
- 1961 - Toulouse-Lautrec Grand Prix, Versailles (France)
- 1961 - Golden Dragon for Nowy Janko Muzykant tied with Mały Western, Cracow (Poland)
- 1962 - 1st and 3rd prizes, International Film Poster Exhibition, Karlove Vary (Czech Republic)
- 1963 - Annecy International Animated Film Festival / FIPRESCI Prize for Labirynt
- 1964 - Honorable Mention for Die Nashörner in Oberhausen International Short Film Festival (Germany)
- 1966 - Gold Medal Prix Max Ernst, International Poster Biennale, Warsaw (Poland)
- 1971 - Gold Medal, International Tourism Poster Exhibition, Catania (Italy)
- 1985 - Prix Jules Chéret (France)
- 1987 - Graphics award, Children Book Fair, Bologna (Italy)
- 1999 - Dragon of Dragons Honorary Awards in Cracow Film Festival (Poland)

== Directions ==
Jan Lenica was the director of:

- 1957 - Nagrodzone uczucia (Love Requited)
- 1957 - Był sobie raz... (Once Upon a Time...)
- 1958 - Dom (House)
- 1961 - Italia '61
- 1961 - Nowy Janko Muzykant
- 1963 - Labirynt
- 1965 - La Femme Fleur
- 1965 - A
- 1965 - Rhinoceros
- 1970 - Adam 2
- 1987 - Ubu et la Grande Gidouille
- 2001 - Wyspa R.O.

== See also ==
- List of graphic designers
- List of Polish painters
- List of Polish graphic designers
- Graphic design
