= Dom (film) =

1958 film

Dom (Polish for House) is a 1958 Polish short film directed by Walerian Borowczyk and Jan Lenica. The short combines live action with various animation techniques, such as stop motion, cut-out animation and pixilation.

== Plot ==
A woman (played by Borowczyk's wife Ligia Branice) has a series of surreal, dream-like hallucinations and encounters within the confines of a lonely apartment building. Some of these bizarre occurrences include various abstract objects appearing in a room, two men engaging in fencing and martial arts, a man entering and leaving a room repeatedly, and a living wig destroying several items on a table. The film ends with the woman passionately kissing a male mannequin's face before it crumbles to pieces.

== Awards ==
Dom was nominated to the 1959 BAFTA Film Award, in the category "Best Animated Film", but lost to The Violinist.

== See also ==
- List of avant-garde films of the 1950s
