= Malice@Doll =

Japanese original video animation

- North American DVD cover
- Genre: Dark fantasy; Science fiction
- Created by: Chiaki J. Konaka
- Original video animation
- Directed by: Keitaro Motonaga
- Produced by: Tsutomu Kuno; Naruhito Yamazaki; Katsuaki Takemoto
- Written by: Chiaki J. Konaka
- Studio: Visual Science Research Institute (Note: Credited as CG production (CG制作).)
- Licensed by: NA: Arts Magic
- Released: April 27, 2001 – June 22, 2001
- Runtime: 30 minutes each
- Episodes: 3

Malice@Doll is a 2001 Japanese computer generated original video animation directed by Keitarou Motonaga and written by Chiaki Konaka.

== Plot ==
Prior to the film, an apocalyptic event eradicated all of humanity from the world. The only animate things left in the world are machines, who continue their programmed tasks as they slowly deteriorate. Among these machines is Malice, a Doll (prostitute robot) who resides in a derelict red-light district with her fellow Dolls and continues looking for clients. Her other friends include Joe Administrator/Joe Admin (a robot governing the area), Freddy (a cleaning robot), and Meliza Piper (a plumbing robot).

After having a "dream" of a bouncing ball, dismissed as a memory replaying from Malice's memory banks, Malice goes looking for clients. Upon discovering her damage, Joe Admin sends Malice to the repairer residing in an upper area, warning her that Devo Leukocyte, a former bodyguard unit, had forgotten his original programming and became hostile to anything it crosses. After narrowly escaping Leukocyte (with the help of Meliza), Malice happens upon an area she never saw before and is guided by a little spectral girl holding a ball to a room containing a large, stone-like structure/machine. Upon speaking to the machine, a tentacle-like monster bursts out of it and brutally assaults Malice, causing her to black out as the spectral girl watches.

Malice awakens in her room, shocked to find that she has become human. Though enjoying her newfound humanity initially, Joe Admin rejects her, upsetting her enough to run away. However, the Leukocyte attacks Malice, defeating Joe Admin when he tries to rescue her. Malice hides with the help of Meliza but accidentally gives away their position, causing the Leukocyte to bisect Meliza. Heartbroken, Malice kisses Meliza, causing the latter to revive and mutate into a monster that defeats Leukocyte (at the cost of her own life).

An encounter with the repairer unit she originally sought out upsets Malice even further, causing her to return to the red-light district to seek comfort with her fellow Dolls. However, she is shunned and flees back to her room, where she hallucinates about her life as a prostitute. Horrified by the visions, she's comforted by Heather, a fellow Doll who usually teases Malice. After a conversation, Malice kisses Heather, resulting in Heather mutating and becoming alive like Meliza.

Malice and Heather spread the infection to all the machines in the area, their intent to bring happiness to the despairing machines. The only one to resist the temptation is Joe Admin, who shows Malice the result of her actions, namely, the pain and perverted madness within the hosts of the infection. Malice is led from her room by the little ghost girl again, only to find Heather dying in an alley. Heather professes her affection for Malice before passing on. With Joe Admin by her side, Malice resolves to return to the room with the tentacle monster.

Upon reaching the area, Joe Admin discovers he can't see the room or the ghost girl. He asks Malice to kiss him to allow him to see the world she sees. She seems to oblige at first but pushes Joe Admin away and sprints to the door, separating the two.

In the room, Malice finds the tentacle creature lying on the ground, seemingly dead. She angrily begins tearing the structure that held the beast apart, ultimately discovering a glowing version of herself within. The glowing double talks to Malice about her dream of "Dolls having a body like this." Malice speaks of a dream she had about Dolls having robotic bodies and unfeeling hearts. Malice begins to question whether or not she was a Doll or if that was a "dream" as well. She begins to fuse with the structure as Joe Admin, transformed into an organic being, walks in and tries to save her. The structure reforms around Malice, trapping her within, and Joe Admin kisses it.

Malice states she'll "dream a different dream" and becomes a glowing angelic being, making the structure vanish before flying away. As she flies away, the machines (and status quo) become restored. However, Malice is only referred to as "a voice", denoting that she vanished from her friends' memories as a Doll in this altered reality. Then Joe Admin is fighting a machine; after the battle ends, Joe Admin's sensors detect an object moving towards him. It's Malice, who kisses him, then continues on her way and disappears from Administrator Joe's radar. Malice flies out of the machine world, singing as Heather gleefully chases her.
