= Lothar Dräger =

German comic writer (1927–2016)

Lothar Dräger (January 19, 1927 – July 9, 2016) was a German comic writer.

== Writings ==
- Mosaik (Digedags) by Hannes Hegen, Co-author from 1957 to 1975
- Mosaik (Abrafaxe), author and artistic director from 1976 to 1990.
- Lothar Dräger, Ulf S. Graupner: Ritter Runkel und seine Zeit. Berlin 2002. (novel)
- Lothar Dräger, Ulf S. Graupner: Ritter Runkel der Diplomat. Berlin 2006. (novel)
- Lothar Dräger, Ulf S. Graupner: Ritter Runkel die Legende. Berlin 2009. (novel)
- Lothar Dräger, Ulf S. Graupner: Im Namen der Rübe. Berlin 2012. (novel)

== Literature ==
- Thomas Kramer: Micky, Marx und Manitu – Zeit-und Kulturgeschichte im Spiegel eines DDR-Comics 1955–1990. Berlin 2002.
- Matthias Friske: Die Geschichte des 'MOSAIK von Hannes Hegen'. Eine Comic-Legende in der DDR, Berlin 2008.
- Mark Lehmstedt: Die geheime Geschichte der Digedags. Die Publikations- und Zensurgeschichte des Mosaik von Hannes Hegen, Leipzig 2010, Lehmstedt Verlag.
