= Michael F. Scholz =

German university professor in modern and contemporary history

Michael F. Scholz (born 13 September 1958 in Berlin) is a German university professor in modern and contemporary history, currently (2015) based in Sweden.

One of his research interests involves the insights available from comics and comic strips, especially in the field of propaganda, into popular culture and political history.

== Life ==
Michael F.Scholz was born in East Berlin, slightly less than ten years after the Soviet occupation zone had given way to the Soviet sponsored German Democratic Republic (East Germany) in which he grew up and made his way until 1989/90. He studied History and Political sciences at the University of Greifswald, focusing especially on the culture and politics of northern Europe. He received his doctorate shortly before his 32nd birthday for a dissertation on the "Rostock Baltic Sea Festival Week in East German foreign Policy (1958-1975)" ("Rostocker Ostseewochen in der Aussenpolitik der DDR").

Between 1986 and 1998 he was employed as a graduate research assistant at Greifswald. During this period Scholz came to public attention in connection with researches undertaken on the wartime career, as a German communist politician exiled in Sweden, of Herbert Wehner, known to a younger generation of West Germans as a high-profile senior SPD politician from the Willy Brandt era. According to the view of the matter presented by Der Spiegel, Stolz's researches disclosed that Wehner's break with Soviet sponsored communism had been a far more convoluted process than Wehner himself had publicly disclosed. Despite his Communist past, when Wehner arrived in Sweden he was suspected of being a Gestapo agent, as a result of which he faced arrest and robust interrogation by the Swedes. Scholz nevertheless felt able to exonerate Wehner of the persistent charge that under interrogation he had implicated fellow communists, insisting that he only every told his Swedish interrogators what they already knew.

Further academic advancement arrived in 1999 when Scholz received his habilitation from Greifswald for work dealing more generally with Communist exiles from Nazi Germany who had escaped to Sweden, and the way their experiences there had remained influential after they became "returnees" in what became East Germany.("Skandinavische Erfahrungen erwünscht? Nachexil und Remigration. Die ehemaligen KPD-Emigranten in Skandinavien und ihr weiteres Schicksal in der SBZ/DDR"). After this he briefly became a freelance lecturer on modern history. Shortly afterwards he relocated to Sweden, from November 2000 teaching at the island Gotland Academy (subsequently integrated to Uppsala University as "Campus Gotland"). In 2008 he was appointed to a professorship in Modern History at Gottland, where he has also been employed, since 2011, as a faculty co-ordinator.

== Output ==
Scholz has published a number of pieces on the political and cultural history of East Germany, on the relations between the two Germanys before 1990, and on Scandinavian history. He has contributed the section on East Germany to updated editions of the (24 volume, venerable but periodically updated) "Gebhardt" Manual of German History.

One of several publications reflecting his long-standing interest in comics and comic strips as sources for political and cultural historians was "Schuldig ist schließlich jeder…, Comics in der DDR – Die Geschichte eines ungeliebten Mediums von 1945/49–1990" ("In the end, everyone is to blame..., Comics in East Germany – The history of an unloved medium 1945/49 – 1990"), produced jointly with others including, primarily, Gerd Lettkemann.
