= List of animated television series of 2001 =

A list of animated television series first aired in 2001.

Animated television series first aired in 2001
Title	Seasons	Episodes	Country	Year	Original Channel	Technique
2DTV	5	36	United Kingdom	2001–04	ITV	Flash
a-jang.com	1	13	South Korea	2001–02	KBS2	Traditional
Aaagh! It's the Mr. Hell Show!	1	13	United Kingdom; Canada	2001–02	BBC Two	Flash
Adventure King Jangbogo	1	5	South Korea	2001–02	KBS2	Traditional
The Adventures of Edward the Less	1	13	United States	2001	Sci-Fi Channel	Traditional
The Adventures of Marco & Gina	1	26	Italy; France	2001	Rai Due; Rai Gulp; RaiSat Ragazzi; KI.KA	Traditional
The Adventures of Montu Miah	1	21	Bangladesh	2001–07	Ekushey Television	CGI
Agrippine	1	26	France	2001	Canal+	Traditional
Alienators: Evolution Continues	1	26	United States; Japan; France	2001–02	Fox Kids; M6; Animax	Traditional
Angelina Ballerina	2	20	United Kingdom	2001–03	ITV	Traditional
Animated Tales of the World	3	39	United Kingdom	2001–03	Channel 4 HBO	CGI/Traditional/Stop Motion
Anne of Green Gables: The Animated Series	1	26	Canada	2001–02	TVOntario	Traditional
The Autocrats	14	223	Finland	2001–08	Yle TV1	CGI
BASToF Lemon	1	26	South Korea	2001	KBS	Traditional
Behind the Music that Sucks	1	23	United States	2001	Mondo Mini Shows	Flash
The Bellflower Bunnies	3	52	France; Canada	2001–10	TF1; TVA (season 1); Playhouse Disney (season 2)	Traditional
Bill and Ben	2	52	United Kingdom	2001–02	CBBC (2001); CBeebies(2001–02)	Stop Motion
Binka	2	26	United Kingdom	2001	CBBC	Traditional
Braceface	3	78	Canada; China	2001–04	Teletoon	Traditional
The Brak Show	3	29	United States	2001–07	Cartoon Network (2000); Adult Swim (2001–03); Adult Swim Video (2007)	Flash
Butt-Ugly Martians	1	26	United States; Hong Kong; United Kingdom	2001–03	ITV	CGI
Caibao Xiao Huli	1	13	China	2001		Traditional
Capertown Cops	1	17	United States; Canada	2001		Traditional
Cartouche, prince des faubourgs	1	26	France	2001–02	M6	Traditional
Cédric	3	156	France	2001–07	Canal J	Traditional
Chengshi Yezhan Pai	1	26	China	2001		CGI
The Children of Toromiro	1	26	France	2001	France 2	Traditional
The Chuck Jones Show	1	6	United States	2001–03	Cartoon Network	Traditional
Cocco Bill	2	104	Italy; Germany (season 1); Hong Kong (season 2)	2001–04	Rai 2 Rai 1 RaiSat Ragazzi; Sat.1	Traditional
Committed	1	13	Canada; Philippines	2001	CTV	Traditional
Connie the Cow	3	44	Spain; Canada	2001–05	TVE 2 BBC Kids	Flash
The Cramp Twins	2	52	Germany; United Kingdom; United States (season 1)	2001–04	Cartoon Network	Traditional
Cubix	2	26	South Korea; United States	2001–04	SBS; KBS 2TV	CGI
Cyrano 2022	1	26	France	2001	France 2	Traditional
Da Möb	1	14	Sweden	2001–02	Sveriges Television	Traditional
Dan Dare: Pilot of the Future	1	26	United Kingdom; United States	2001	Channel 5	CGI
De Du Xiao Heshang		52	China	2001		Traditional
De Onde Vem?	1	20	Brazil	2001	TV Cultura	Flash/Live Action
Don't Eat the Neighbours	1	26	United Kingdom; Canada	2001–02	ITV; YTV	Stop Motion
Dr Otter	3	26	United Kingdom	2001–02	CBBC	Stop Motion
Les Enquêtes de Prudence Petitpas	2	52	Belgium; France	2001–04	TF1	Traditional
Ethelbert the Tiger	2	52	France	2001	France 5	Traditional
Evil Con Carne	2	22	United States	2001–04	Cartoon Network	Traditional
The Fairly OddParents	10	172	United States	2001–17	Nickelodeon (2001–16); Nicktoons (2017)	Traditional (Season 1–9); Flash (Season 10)
Fairy Tale Police Department	1	26	Germany; Australia	2001–02	Seven Network	Traditional
The Fantastic Flying Journey	1	13	United Kingdom	2001		Traditional
Gary & Mike	1	13	United States	2001	UPN	Stop Motion
Gloria's House	1	26	Australia; Germany	2001	Seven Network; KI.KA	Traditional
Grim & Evil	2	27	United States	2001–04	Cartoon Network	Traditional
The Grim Adventures of Billy & Mandy	6	84	United States	2001–07	Cartoon Network	Traditional
Harvey Birdman, Attorney at Law	4	39	United States	2001–18	Adult Swim	Flash
Heavy Gear: The Animated Series	1	40	Canada; United States	2001	Syndication	CGI
Hippo Tub Co.	1	13	Canada	2001	CBC Television	CGI
The Hoobs	5	250	United Kingdom; Canada	2001–03	Channel 4 TVOntario	Stop Motion/Live action
Horrible Histories	2	26	United States; Ireland	2001–02	ITV	Flash
House of Mouse	3	52	United States	2001–03	ABC (2001–02); Toon Disney (2002–03)	Traditional
Indian Folk Tales	1	13	India	2001–02	Splash Channel	
Inspector Beaver	1	2	United States	2001	Mondo Mini Shows	Flash
Inuk	3	39	Canada	2001–09	CBC Television (2001–02); APTN; Tele-Québec	CGI
Invader Zim	2	27	United States	2001–06	Nickelodeon (2001–03); Nicktoons Network (2006)	Traditional
Iron Nose: The Mysterious Knight	1	26	France; Canada	2001	M6	Traditional
Jason and the Heroes of Mount Olympus	1	26	France	2001	TF1; Fox Kids	Traditional
Juanito Jones	1	52	Spain	2001–02	Antena 3	Traditional
Justice League	2	52	United States	2001–04	Cartoon Network	Traditional
The Lampies	2	52	United Kingdom	2001–02	CBBC	Traditional, CGI (backgrounds only)
The Legend of Tarzan	2	39	United States	2001–03	UPN	Traditional
Lizzie McGuire	2	65	United States	2001–04	Disney Channel	Traditional/Live action
Lloyd in Space	4	39	United States	2001–04	ABC (2001–02); Toon Disney (2002–04)	Traditional
Lugar Heights	1	6	United States	2001	Galavisión mun2 MTV Tr3s	Flash
Marcelino Pan y Vino	3	78	Spain; France; Japan; Italy; Mexico	2001–05	TF1; TVE2; Rai Uno; Canal de las Estrellas	Traditional
Mary-Kate and Ashley in Action!	1	26	United States	2001–02	ABC	Traditional
Masyanya	8	165	Russia; Israel	2001–present	YouTube	Flash
Moorhuhn	1	26	Germany	2001		Traditional
The Mummy	2	26	United States	2001–03	Kids' WB	Traditional
Mummy Nanny	1	26	Germany; France	2001	Super RTL; France 2 Canal J	Traditional
Music Up	2	52	China	2001–02	Shanghai Television; CCTV	Traditional
The Networld Adventures of the 12 Family	1	12	China	2001		Traditional
The New Adventures of Lucky Luke	1	52	France; Canada	2001–03	France 3 Télé-Québec/Teletoon	Traditional
Nico	1	26	Spain	2001	TVE	Traditional
El Nombre	2	26	United Kingdom	2001–03	BBC One (series 1); CBeebies (series 2)	Stop Motion
The Oblongs	1	13	United States	2001–02	The WB (2001); Adult Swim (2002)	Traditional
Oswald	1	26	United States; United Kingdom	2001–03	Nickelodeon	Traditional
Pecola	2	26	Japan; Canada	2001–02	TV Tokyo; Teletoon	CGI
The Popeye Show	4	45	United States	2001–03	Cartoon Network	Traditional
Pot Pourri	1	13	India	2001–02	Splash Channel	
The Proud Family	2	52	United States	2001–05	Disney Channel	Traditional
Quads!	2	26	Canada; Australia	2001–02	Teletoon; SBS	Flash
Rainbow Nymph Tongtong	1	19	South Korea	2001–02	KBS2	Traditional
The Ripping Friends	1	13	United States; Canada	2001–02	Fox Kids; Teletoon	Traditional
Sagwa, the Chinese Siamese Cat	1	40	United States; Canada; China	2001–02	PBS Kids; TVOntario; CCTV	Traditional
Samurai Jack	4	52	United States	2001–04	Cartoon Network	Traditional
Sandokan: The Tiger Roars Again	1	26	Italy	2001	Rai Due	Traditional
Sitting Ducks	2	26	United States; Canada	2001–03	Cartoon Network	CGI
Skipper & Skeeto	1	26	Denmark	2001	DR	Traditional
Skyland (2001)	1	13	China	2001		CGI
Stanley	3	65	United States	2001–04	Playhouse Disney	Traditional
Stick Girl	1	19	United States	2001	Mondo Mini Shows	Flash
Taeng-gu & Ulasyong	1	26	South Korea	2001	KBS2	Traditional
Time Squad	2	26	United States	2001–03	Cartoon Network	Traditional
Tiny Planets	1	65	United Kingdom; United States	2001–05	CITV	CGI
Titeuf	4	326	France	2001–17	Canal J	Traditional
Toonimals!	1	26	Spain	2001	Telecinco	Traditional
Totally Spies!	7	182	France; Canada (seasons 3–5)	2001–present	TF1; Teletoon; Télétoon; Gulli	Traditional; Flash (seasons 7 onwards)
Ultimate Book of Spells	1	26	Canada	2001–02	YTV	Traditional
Undergrads	1	13	United States; Canada	2001	MTV; Teletoon	Flash/Traditional
Uniminipet	1	26	South Korea	2001	SBS	Traditional
Untalkative Bunny	3	39	Canada; United Kingdom	2001–03	Teletoon; Disney Channel	Traditional
The Upstairs Downstairs Bears	1	13	United Kingdom; Canada	2001	ITV; Teletoon	Stop Motion
The URL with Phred Show	1	20	United States	2001–02	Noggin	Flash
What's with Andy?	3	78	Canada; United States (season 1); France (season 2)	2001–07	Fox Kids/Jetix; Teletoon; Super RTL (seasons 2–3)	Traditional
Wild Instinct	1	52	France	2001	M6	Traditional
Wombat City	2	52	France	2001	France 2	Traditional
Wumpa's World	1	35	Canada; China	2001–02	Treehouse TV; The Knowledge Channel; APTN; TFO; Télé-Québec; CCTV; TVB; TDM	Stop Motion
Wuz Wuz & Bott Bott	3	19	Egypt	2001–06	Disney Channel, MBC 3	CGI
X-DuckX	2	78	France; Canada	2001–07	France 3	Traditional
Xcalibur	1	40	Canada; France	2001–02	YTV; Canal+ France 2	CGI
Xiaohu Huan Xiang	4	78	China	2001	CCTV-1	Traditional
The Zeta Project	2	26	United States	2001–02	Kids' WB	Traditional

Anime television series first aired in 2001
Title	Episodes	Country	Year	Original Channel	Technique
Angel Tales	13	Japan	2001	Wowow	Traditional
Angelic Layer	26	Japan	2001	TV Tokyo	Traditional
Ask Dr. Rin!	51	Japan	2001–02	TV Tokyo	Traditional
Babel II: Beyond Infinity	13	Japan	2001	ANN	Traditional
Baboo Factory	46	Japan	2001–02	TV Asahi	
Baki the Grappler	24	Japan	2001		Traditional
Banner of the Stars II	10	Japan	2001		Traditional
Beyblade	51	Japan	2001	TV Tokyo	Traditional
Captain Kuppa	26	Japan	2001–02	NHK	Traditional
Captain Tsubasa: Road to 2002	52	Japan	2001–02		Traditional
Chance Pop Session	13	Japan	2001		Traditional
Comic Party	13	Japan	2001		Traditional
Cosmic Baton Girl Princess Comet	43	Japan	2001–02		Traditional
Cosmo Warrior Zero	13	Japan	2001		Traditional
Crush Gear Turbo	68	Japan	2001–03		Traditional
Cyborg 009: The Cyborg Soldier	51	Japan	2001–02	TV Tokyo	Traditional
Dennō Bōkenki Webdiver	52	Japan	2001–02		Traditional
Digimon Tamers	51	Japan	2001–02	Fuji TV	Traditional
Earth Maiden Arjuna	13	Japan	2001		Traditional
The Family's Defensive Alliance	13	Japan	2001		Traditional
Fighting Foodons	26	Japan	2001–02	NHK BS2	Traditional
Figure 17	13	Japan	2001–02		Traditional
Final Fantasy: Unlimited	25	Japan	2001–02	TV Tokyo	Traditional
Fruits Basket	26	Japan	2001	TV Tokyo	Traditional
Galaxy Angel	26	Japan	2001	Animax	Traditional
Geisters	26	Japan	2001–02		Traditional
Geneshaft	13	Japan	2001		Traditional
Go! Go! Itsutsugo Land	50	Japan	2001–02		Traditional
Grappler Baki: Maximum Tournament	24	Japan	2001		Traditional
Great Dangaioh	13	Japan	2001		Traditional
Gyōten Ningen Batseelor	52	Japan	2001–02		Traditional
Hanaukyo Maid Team	12	Japan	2001		Traditional
Haré+Guu	26	Japan	2001	TV Tokyo	Traditional
Hellsing	13	Japan	2001–02	Fuji TV	Traditional
Hikaru no Go	75	Japan	2001–03	TV Tokyo	Traditional
I Love Bubu Chacha!	26	Japan	2001		Traditional
I My Me! Strawberry Eggs	13	Japan	2001	WOWOW	Traditional
Kasumin	78	Japan	2001–03		Traditional
Kaze no Yojimbo	25	Japan	2001–02		Traditional
Ki Fighter Taerang	26	Japan; South Korea	2001–02	MBC	Traditional
Kirby: Right Back at Ya!	100	Japan	2001–03	CBC	Traditional/CGI
Kogepan	10	Japan	2001		Traditional
Kokoro Library	13	Japan	2001–02		Traditional
The Legend of Condor Hero	78	Japan; Hong Kong	2001–08		Traditional
A Little Snow Fairy Sugar	24	Japan	2001–02	TBS	Traditional
Magical Meow Meow Taruto	12	Japan	2001		Traditional
Mahoromatic: Automatic Maiden	12	Japan	2001		Traditional
Mōtto! Ojamajo Doremi	50	Japan	2001–02	TV Asahi	Traditional
Najica Blitz Tactics	12	Japan	2001		Traditional
Noir	26	Japan	2001		Traditional
Nono-chan	61	Japan	2001–02		Traditional
Offside	39	Japan	2001–02		Traditional
Okojo's Happy Apartment	51	Japan	2001–02	TV Tokyo	Traditional
PaRappa the Rapper	30	Japan	2001–02	Fuji TV	Traditional
Piroppo	54	Japan	2001–02		Traditional
Prétear	13	Japan	2001		Traditional
The Prince of Tennis	178	Japan	2001–05	TV Tokyo	Traditional
Project ARMS	26	Japan	2001		Traditional
Project ARMS: The 2nd Chapter	26	Japan	2001–02		Traditional
Rave Master	51	Japan	2001–02	TBS	Traditional
Rune Soldier	24	Japan	2001		Traditional
s-CRY-ed	26	Japan	2001		Traditional
Sadamitsu the Destroyer	10	Japan	2001		Traditional
Salary Man Kintaro	20	Japan	2001		Traditional
Samurai Girl: Real Bout High School	13	Japan	2001		Traditional
Shaman King	64	Japan	2001–02	TV Tokyo	Traditional
Shingu: Secret of the Stellar Wars	26	Japan	2001		Traditional
Sister Princess	26	Japan	2001		Traditional
The SoulTaker	13	Japan	2001	WOWOW	Traditional
Star Ocean EX	26	Japan	2001		Traditional
Steel Angel Kurumi 2	12	Japan	2001		Traditional
Super GALS! Kotobuki Ran	52	Japan	2001–02	TV Tokyo	Traditional
Tales of Eternia: The Animation	13	Japan	2001		Traditional
Vampiyan Kids	26	Japan	2001–02		Traditional
Vandread: The Second Stage	13	Japan	2001–02		Traditional
X	24	Japan	2001–02	WOWOW	Traditional
Yobarete Tobidete! Akubi-chan	26	Japan	2001–02		Traditional
You're Under Arrest	26	Japan	2001	TBS	Traditional
Z.O.E. Dolores, I	26	Japan	2001		Traditional
Zaion: I Wish You Were Here	4	Japan	2001		Traditional
Zoids: New Century	26	Japan	2001		Traditional

== See also ==
- List of animated feature films of 2001
- List of Japanese animation television series of 2001
