= List of animated feature films of 2001 =

This is a list of animated feature films first released in 2001.

== List ==
Title	Country	Director	Production company	Animation technique	Type	Notes	Release date	Duration
10 + 2: The Great Secret; 10 + 2: El gran secreto	Spain	Miquel Pujol		Traditional	Theatrical		August 17, 2001	85 minutes
Aida of the Trees; Aida degli alberi	Italy; United Kingdom	Guido Manuli	Medusa	Traditional	Theatrical		December 21, 2001	75 minutes
The Abrafaxe – Under The Black Flag; Die Abrafaxe – Unter schwarzer Flagge	Germany; South Korea	Gerhard Hahn; Tony Power	Universal Pictures Produktion; Abrafaxe Trickfilm; Hahn Film	Traditional	Theatrical		October 25, 2001	81 minutes
Atlantis: The Lost Empire	United States	Gary Trousdale; Kirk Wise	Walt Disney Feature Animation	Traditional	Theatrical		June 3, 2001 (premiere); June 15, 2001 (United States)	96 minutes
Go! Anpanman: Gomira's Star それいけ!アンパンマン ゴミラの星	Japan	Shunji Oga	Anpanman Production Committee; TMS Entertainment	Traditional			July 14, 2001	50 minutes
Barbie in the Nutcracker	Canada; United States	Owen Hurley	Mainframe Entertainment; Mattel Entertainment	Computer	Direct-to-video		October 2, 2001	78 minutes
Becassine and the Viking Treasure; Bécassine – Le trésor Viking	France			Traditional	Theatrical		December 12, 2001	85 minutes
Birdvillage: The Movie	United States	Scott Cawthon	Cawthon Entertainment	Computer	Direct-to-video		2001	44 minutes
Blue Remains	Japan	Hisaya Takabayashi; Toshifumi Takizawa	GAGA Communications	Computer			August 22, 2001	77 minutes
The Book of Pooh: Stories from the Heart	United States	Mitchell Kriegman; Dean Gordon	Shadow Projects	Live action / Computer / Puppetry	Direct-to-Video		July 17, 2001	76 minutes
Case Closed: Countdown to Heaven 名探偵コナン 天国へのカウントダウン (Meitantei Conan Tengoku e no Kauntodaun)	Japan	Kenji Kodama	Toho	Traditional	Theatrical		April 21, 2001	95 minutes
Christmas Carol: The Movie	United Kingdom; Germany	Jimmy T. Murakami	Pathé; Winchester Films; Illuminated Film Company; FilmFour; UK Film Council	Traditional / Live action	Theatrical		September 15, 2001 (Toronto International Film Festival); December 7, 2001 (United Kingdom)	81 minutes
Commando Stoertebeker; Kommando Störtebeker	Germany	Ute von Münchow-Pohl		Traditional	Theatrical		September 20, 2001	83 minutes
Cowboy Bebop, Knockin' on Heaven's Door	Japan	Shinichirō Watanabe	Sunrise; Bones; Bandai Visual	Traditional	Theatrical		September 1, 2001	115 minutes
Crayon Shin-chan: The Adult Empire Strikes Back クレヨンしんちゃん 嵐を呼ぶ モーレツ！オトナ帝国の逆襲 (Kureyon Shinchan: Arashi o Yobu: Mōretsu! Otona Teikoku no Gyakushū?)	Japan	Keiichi Hara	Shin-Ei Animation	Traditional	Theatrical		April 21, 2001	90 minutes
David Macaulay: Mill Times	United States	Larry Klein	WGBH-TV; Unicorn Projects	Traditional/live-action	Television film		2001	56 minutes
Doraemon: Nobita and the Winged Braves ドラえもん のび太と翼の勇者たち (Doraemon Nobita to Tsubasa no Yūsha-tachi)	Japan	Tsutomu Shibayama	Shin-Ei Animation	Traditional	Theatrical		March 10, 2001	91 minutes
Final Fantasy: The Spirits Within	Japan; United States	Hironobu Sakaguchi	Square Pictures	Computer	Theatrical		July 2, 2001 (premiere); July 11, 2001 (United States)	106 minutes
Fracasse	Spain; France			Traditional	Television film			114 minutes
Franklin's Magic Christmas	Canada	John van Bruggen	Nelvana	Traditional	TV special		November 6, 2001	55 minutes
Fünf Wochen im Ballon	China; Germany	Manfred Durniok, Hong Hu Zhao	Shanghai Animation Film Studio	Stop motion	Theatrical		December 31, 2001	85 minutes
Hamtaro: Adventures in Ham-Ham Land	Japan			Traditional	Theatrical		December 15, 2001	50 minutes
The Happy Cricket; O Grilo Feliz	Brazil	Walbercy Ribas	Start Desenhos Animados	Traditional	Theatrical		July 20, 2001	80 minutes
Hay – The Gazelle Child	Arab League			Traditional	Theatrical			
The House of Morecock	United States	Joe Phillips	Adult Visual Animation Home Video	Traditional	Direct-to-video		September 14, 2001	61 minutes
Initial D: Third Stage	Japan	Noboru Mitsusawa	Studio Deen	Traditional	Theatrical		January 13, 2001	105 minutes
InuYasha the Movie: Affections Touching Across Time 映画犬夜叉 時代を越える想い (Eiga Inuyasha: Toki o Koeru Omoi)	Japan	Toshiya Shinohara	Sunrise	Traditional	Theatrical	First installment of the Inuyasha film series	December 15, 2001	100 minutes
The Jar: A Tale from the East	Syria	Ammar Al Sharbaji	Star Animation	Traditional	Theatrical	First Syrian animated feature		63 minutes
Jimmy Neutron: Boy Genius	United States	John A. Davis	Nickelodeon Movies; O Entertainment; DNA Productions	Computer	Theatrical	Nominated for Best Animated Feature	December 21, 2001	82 minutes
The Kid aka. Gahan Wilson's The Kid	Canada; United States			Traditional	Television film		October 30, 2001	75 minutes
Lady and the Tramp II: Scamp's Adventure	United States	Darrell Rooney; Jeannine Roussel	Walt Disney Television Animation	Traditional	Direct-to-video		February 27, 2001	69 minutes
The Land Before Time VIII: The Big Freeze	United States	Charles Grosvenor	Universal Cartoon Studios	Traditional	Direct-to-video		December 4, 2001	76 minutes
Ladybirds' Christmas; Lepatriinude jõulud	Estonia			Traditional	Theatrical		November 29, 2001	54 minutes
La leyenda del unicornio	Spain	Maite Ruiz de Austri		Traditional	Theatrical		December 21, 2001	70 minutes
The Little Bear Movie	Canada	Raymond Jafelice	Nelvana Limited	Traditional	Direct-to-video		August 7, 2001	75 minutes
The Little Polar Bear; Der Kleine Eisbär	Germany	Piet De Rycker; Thilo Rothkirch	Rothkirch Cartoon Film	Traditional / Computer	Theatrical		October 4, 2001	78 minutes
Little Potam; Petit Potam	France			Traditional	Theatrical		May 30, 2001	77 minutes
The Living Forest; El bosque animado, sentirás su magia	Spain	Ángel de la Cruz, Manolo Gómez	Dygra Films; Megatrix	Computer	Theatrical		August 3, 2001	83 minutes
Malice@Doll	Japan	Keitaro Motonaga	GAGA Communications; Soeishinsha	Computer	OVA		April 27, 2001	78 minutes
Marco Polo: Return to Xanadu	United States			Traditional	Theatrical		December 22, 2001	82 minutes
Metropolis メトロポリス (Metoroporisu)	Japan	Rintaro	Madhouse	Traditional	Theatrical		May 26, 2001	113 minutes
Mickey's Magical Christmas: Snowed in at the House of Mouse	United States	Tony Craig; Roberts Gannaway	Walt Disney Television Animation	Traditional	Direct-to-video		November 6, 2001	65 minutes
Millennium Actress 千年女優 (Sennen Joyū)	Japan	Satoshi Kon	Madhouse	Traditional	Theatrical		July 28, 2001 (Fantasia Film Festival); September 14, 2002 (Japan)	87 minutes
Momo; Momo alla conquista del tempo	Italy; Germany	Enzo D'Alò	Cecchi Gori Group Tiger Cinematografica; Taurus Produktion	Traditional	Theatrical		December 21, 2001	80 minutes
Monkeybone	United States	Henry Selick	1492 Pictures	Stop-motion / Live action	Theatrical		February 23, 2001	92 minutes
Monsters, Inc.	United States	Pete Docter	Pixar Animation Studios	Computer	Theatrical	Nominated for Best Animated Feature	October 28, 2001 (El Capitan Theatre); November 2, 2001 (United States)	92 minutes
Mr. Blot's Triumph; Tryumf Pana Kleksa	Poland	Krzysztof Gradowski	Studio Miniatur Filmowych	Traditional / Live action	Theatrical		October 12, 2001	72 minutes
Mutant Aliens	United States	Bill Plympton	Plymptoons	Traditional	Theatrical		January 24, 2001	81 minutes
My Life as McDull	Hong Kong	Toe Yuen		Traditional	Theatrical		December 15, 2001	76 minutes
Old Master Q 2001 老夫子2001 (lou5 fu1 zi2 2001)	Hong Kong; Macau	Herman Yau	China Star Entertainment Group; One Hundred Years of Film; Film Workshop	Computer / Live action	Theatrical		April 5, 2001 (Hong Kong, Macau); May 23, 2001 (Singapore); July 14, 2001 (Taiwan)	103 minutes
One Piece: Clockwork Island Adventure	Japan	Junji Shimizu	Toei Animation	Traditional	Theatrical		March 3, 2001	55 minutes
Osmosis Jones	United States	Tom Sito; Piet Kroon (animation); Robert Farrelly; Peter Farrelly (live-action)	Warner Bros. Feature Animation; Conundrum Entertainment	Traditional / Live action	Theatrical		August 7, 2001 (premiere); August 10, 2001 (United States)	83 minutes
Pokémon 4Ever	Japan	Kunihiko Yuyama	OLM, Inc.	Traditional	Theatrical	Final Pokémon film to use traditional cel animation	July 7, 2001	75 minutes
Putih	Malaysia			Traditional	Theatrical		October 25, 2001	90 minutes
ReBoot: Daemon Rising	Canada	George Roman Samilski	AAC Kids; Mainframe Entertainment	Computer	Television film		November 18, 2001	85 minutes
ReBoot: My Two Bobs	Canada	Steve Ball	AAC Kids; Mainframe Entertainment	Computer	Television film		November 25, 2001	90 minutes
Recess Christmas: Miracle on Third Street	United States	Chuck Sheetz; Susie Dietter	Walt Disney Television Animation	Traditional	Direct-to-Video		November 6, 2001	63 minutes
Recess: School's Out	United States	Chuck Sheetz	Walt Disney Television Animation; Paul & Joe Productions	Traditional	Theatrical		February 10, 2001 (premiere); February 16, 2001 (United States)	83 minutes
Rudolph the Red-Nosed Reindeer and the Island of Misfit Toys	Canada	Bill Kowalchulk	Golden Books Family Entertainment; Tundra Productions	Computer	Direct-to-Video		October 30, 2001	74 minutes
Sakura Wars: The Movie サクラ大戦 活動写真 (Sakura Taisen Katsudō Shashin)	Japan	Mitsuru Hongo	Production I.G	Traditional	Theatrical		December 21, 2001	85 minutes
The Santa Claus Brothers	Canada; United States	Mike Fallows	Nelvana; Sitting Ducks Productions; Film Roman	Computer	Television film		December 13, 2001	60 minutes
Scooby-Doo and the Cyber Chase	United States	Jim Stenstrum	Warner Bros. Animation; Hanna-Barbera Cartoons	Traditional	Direct-to-Video	First Scooby-Doo direct-to-video film to use digital ink and paint Final Hanna-Barbera film before being absorbed by Warner Bros. Animation; Direct-to-Video	October 9, 2001	75 minutes
Shenmue: The Movie	Japan			Computer	Direct-to-video		January 20, 2001	88 minutes
Shrek	United States	Vicky Jenson; Andrew Adamson	DreamWorks Animation; PDI/DreamWorks	Computer	Theatrical	First-ever winner of the Best Animated Feature Award	April 22, 2001 (Mann Village Theatre); May 18, 2001 (United States)	90 minutes
Spirited Away	Japan	Hayao Miyazaki	Studio Ghibli	Traditional	Theatrical	The highest grossing Japanese film of all time, won Best Animated Feature, and considered by many to be the greatest anime features of all time.	July 20, 2001	125 minutes
Tom and Jerry: The Magic Ring	United States	James Tim Walker	Turner Entertainment Co. Warner Bros. Animation	Traditional	Direct-to-video		November 12, 2001 (United Kingdom); March 12, 2002 (United States)	64 minutes
The Trumpet of the Swan	United States	Richard Rich; Terry L. Noss	Nest Family Entertainment; RichCrest Animation Studios	Traditional	Theatrical		May 11, 2001	75 minutes
The Vœu; Le Vœu	France	David Alaux; Éric Tosti	TAT Productions	Stop motion	Short film			
VeggieTales: Lyle the Kindly Viking	United States	Tim Hodge	Big Idea Productions	Computer	Direct-to-video		March 24, 2001	36 minutes
VeggieTales: The Ultimate Silly Song Countdown	United States	Tom Bancroft	Big Idea Productions	Computer	Direct-to-video		September 15, 2001	43 minutes
Waking Life	United States	Richard Linklater	Independent Film Channel Productions; Thousand Words; Flat Black Films; Detour Filmproduction	Rotoscoping	Theatrical		January 23, 2001 (Sundance); October 19, 2001 (United States)	101 minutes

== Highest-grossing films ==
The following is a list of the 10 highest-grossing animated feature films first released in 2001.

Rank	Title	Studio	Worldwide gross	Ref.
1	Monsters, Inc.	Pixar	$562,816,256	
2	Shrek	Pacific Data Images / DreamWorks Animation	$484,409,218	
3	Spirited Away	Studio Ghibli	$358,656,279	(Note: Spirited Away gross: Japan – ¥30.8 billion ($253,437,451); China – $70 million; Outside of Japan and China – $41,368,351; United States and Canada – $12,427,717 (30 October 2018); South Korea – $11,382,770 (15 August 2002); France – $6,326,294 (26 June 2002); Other territories – $11,231,570)
4	Atlantis: The Lost Empire	Walt Disney Feature Animation	$186,053,725	
5	Jimmy Neutron: Boy Genius	Nickelodeon Movies / O Entertainment / DNA Productions	$102,992,536	
6	Final Fantasy: The Spirits Within	Square Pictures	$85,131,830	
7	Pokémon 4Ever	OLM, Inc.	$74,198,193	
8	Recess: School's Out	Walt Disney Television Animation / Rough Draft Studios	$44,460,850	
9	Doraemon: Nobita and the Winged Braves	Asatsu / Toho	$29,322,550 (¥3.35 billion)	
10	Clockwork Island Adventure/Digimon Adventure 02: Revenge of Diaboromon	Toei Animation	$26,259,000 (¥3 billion)	

== See also ==
- List of animated television series of 2001
