= List of Rave Master episodes =

This is a list of episodes of the anime series Rave Master, which is based on the first twelve volumes of the thirty-five volume manga series written by Hiro Mashima. Rave Master premiered in Japan on TBS on October 13, 2001, and ran until September 28, 2002. The anime series is loosely based on the first ninety-five chapters of the manga series.

In the original Japanese release, four pieces of theme music are used. For the first season, episodes one through twenty-five, "Butterfly Kiss" is used for the opening sequence, while "Kohaku no Yurikago" (琥珀の揺りかご) is used for the ending. Both pieces are performed by Chihiro Yonekura. For the second season, Kumoko performs the opening and ending themes of "Higher and Higher" and "Hikousen" (飛行船), respectively.

The series is licensed for an English language release by Tokyopop. Tokyopop chose to release the series only in an English dubbed format, The English dubbed version premiered on Cartoon Network in the United States on June 5, 2004, as part of the Toonami programming block. For this release, the company replaced the series music. "Rave-o-lution" by Reel Big Fish became the new opening theme, while "The Power of Destiny" by Jennifer Paige was used for the ending.

== Episodes ==
=== Season 1 ===
No.	Tokyopop title / Translated title Japanese title	Original release date	English air date
1	"The Rave Master, Part 1" / "The Rave's Heir"; Transliteration: "Reivu o Tsugu Mono" (Japanese: レイヴを継ぐ者)	October 13, 2001	June 5, 2004
The Rave Master Shiba and his guardian "dog", Plue, use the sacred Rave stones to destroy the evil power-granting Shadow Stones. However, Shiba fails to completely destroy the final Shadow Stone, and the resulting explosion known as Overdrive obliterates one tenth of the world and scatters the Rave stones. Fifty years later, Plue accompanies a new Rave Master named Haru Glory, who is separated from Plue in Hip Hop Town. Plue is found by a girl named Elie before being abducted by a member of the criminal organization Shadow Guard and forced into a deadly dog race. Haru and Elie rescue Plue, but they are attacked by the track manager, Georco, who uses a Shadow Stone that turns his body into smoke. Haru defeats Georco by shattering his Shadow Stone with his Rave-powered sword, the Decaforce Sword, and flees with Plue and Elie on a carriage pulled by the freed racing dogs.
2	"The Rave Master, Part 2" / "Shuda of the Bursting Flames"; Transliteration: "Bakuen no Shuda" (Japanese: 爆炎のシュダ)	October 20, 2001	June 12, 2004
Haru, Elie, and Plue attempt to leave Hip Hop Town, but their carriage falls into a pit leading underground. They meet a tunneler named Haul, who helps them evade the Shadow Guard members pursuing them. However, the three are cornered by Shuda, a high-ranking member of the Shadow Guard. Shuda retreats after Haru destroys his flame-producing Shadow Stone, revealing in the process that he knows about Haru's missing father, Gale Glory. Haru's Decaforce Sword breaks as a result of the battle, to which Elie suggests he visit the blacksmith Musica at Punk Street to have it repaired. When Elie reveals that she has amnesia, Haru invites her to come with him to help her recover her memory.
3	"Release the Beasts, Part 1" / "Legendary Blacksmith Musica"; Transliteration: "Densetsu no Kajiya Mujika" (Japanese: 伝説の鍛冶屋ムジカ)	October 27, 2001	June 19, 2004
En route to Punk Street to find the blacksmith Musica, Haru and Elie encounter the bandit gang Silver Rhythm due a misunderstanding, unaware that their leader's name is Musica. Briefly splitting up with Elie upon reaching Punk Street, Haru meets an old man who claims to be the blacksmith. After convincing Haru to leave him with the broken Decaforce Sword and Rave, the man contacts a member of the Shadow Guard named Bis, who comes to confiscate the sword, but leaves it when he cannot find Rave, which the man keeps for himself. Meanwhile, Elie finds Silver Rhythm's Musica and introduces him to Haru, leading to confusion between the three when Musica says he does not know a blacksmith with his name. As they fight off Bis and his men, Musica reveals himself to be the last surviving member of his family, calling the older Musica an imposter.
4	"Release the Beasts, Part 2" / "Beast Swordsman Lance"; Transliteration: "Jūken no Otoko Ransu" (Japanese: 獣剣の男ランス)	November 3, 2001	June 26, 2004
Elie is kidnapped by Bis's superior, Lance, who holds her hostage to lure Haru and obtain Rave. Meanwhile, Haru confronts the old man over his true identity, explaining his own inheritance of the Decaforce Sword from Shiba. In a flashback, Shiba visits Haru's home of Garage Island and finds Plue, the only one capable of finding the scattered Rave stones, in order to complete his mission as the Rave Master to destroy the Shadow Stones. When they are attacked by a Shadow Guard member who has been pursuing him, Shiba discovers he has lost his control of Rave to Haru, whom he deems his successor. In the present, Plue and Musica alert Haru to Elie's kidnapping. Inspired by Haru's resolve to save her after hearing Lance's name, the older Musica agrees to repair the Decaforce Sword.
5	"Release the Beasts, Part 3" / "Revival! The Ten Commandments"; Transliteration: "Fukkatsu! Ten Komandomentsu" (Japanese: 復活! テン・コマンドメンツ)	November 10, 2001	July 3, 2004
The older Musica repairs Haru's sword, making it stronger than before. He also begs Haru to destroy the Beast Sword that Lance used to murder his family, revealing himself to be the one who forged it. Meanwhile, the younger Musica fights off Lance's men to rescue Elie. Bis attacks Musica until Lance slashes him in the back for wrecking his headquarters in the process. Lance personally fights Musica, using his Beast Sword to create illusory beasts and injure him. Haru arrives in time to stop Lance from killing Elie and uses his knowledge the blacksmith has told him about the Beast Sword's weakness to prevent him from creating any illusions. However, Lance reveals that he has a Shadow Stone embedded in his weapon, which allows him to summon a new illusion.
6	"Release the Beasts, Part 4" / "Showdown! Musica's Two Swords; Transliteration: "Taiketsu! Mujika no Futatsu no Ken" (Japanese: 対決! ムジカのふたつの剣)	November 17, 2001	July 10, 2004
The blacksmith Musica sets out to assist Haru upon remembering Lance's Shadow Stone, which has the power to make his Beast Sword's illusions real for brief moments at a time. Haru uses the Rave's power to fend off the illusions, but proves to be too inexperienced with the Decaforce Sword to effectively fight Lance. After Plue intervenes to calm him down, Haru tries to figure out the Shadow Stone's weakness, but to no avail. After Plue restrains Lance's arm with a chain, the blacksmith arrives to hold Lance down and tells Haru to stab through him to defeat Lance.
7	"Release the Beasts, Part 5" / "Conclusion! Victorious Explosion"; Transliteration: "Ketchaku! Shōri no Ekusupurōjon" (Japanese: 決着! 勝利の爆発の剣(エクスプロージョン))	November 24, 2001	July 17, 2004
Haru refuses to kill the blacksmith Musica and instead jumps on his back to destroy Lance's Shadow Stone. With his ordinary techniques no longer effective against Haru, Lance pretends to surrender and tricks Haru and the blacksmith into sparing his life, but Haru defeats him and destroys the Beast Sword with his Decaforce Sword's Explosion form. The rest of Lance's henchmen attempt to steal the Rave, only to be stopped by the younger Musica, who reveals himself to be a Silver Claimer with the power to manipulate silver. Haru and his friends escape Lance's headquarters as the Imperial Guard infiltrates the building to find Demon Card defeated.
8	"Breaking Out" / "Musica of the Silver Rhythm"; Transliteration: "Shiruba Rizumu no Musika" (Japanese: 銀の旋律(シルバリズム)のムジカ)	December 1, 2001	July 31, 2004
The Silver Rhythm Gang break into a city bank. Using Musica's help, they manage to get inside the safe. They are unable to find a silver object, known as the Silver Ray, among the gold bars and dollars, much to their chagrin. Hebi, second-in-command of the Silver Rhythm Gang, finds Plue in his bag, which results in setting off the alarm. Hebi and Plue are in custody, and Musica turns himself in, having a plan to break out. They manage to escape, but the police are out to search for them. It is revealed that Garein is Musica's grandfather. To prove that, Garein shows the Musica family tattoo on his right arm. But Musica doesn't have the tattoo on the same arm, as it is revealed later on that he has it on his left arm. Garein informs Haru and Elie that there is a Rave Stone that was located in the north.
9	"A Bite to Eat" / "Plue's Secret"; Transliteration: "Purū no Himitsu" (Japanese: プルーのひみつ)	December 8, 2001	August 7, 2004
As Haru, Elie, and Plue prepare to head the north, they are to be escorted by Griffon Kato. Griff informs them that they will stop at Ska Village as a checkpoint, then continue on their way toward Experiment City. While at a nearby hot spring, Elie decides to twist Plue's nose to discover anything unusual, which leads to Plue deflated. Haru and Elie make an effort to return Plue to normal. However, this results in an argument between the two. Griff tells Elie to go to a nearby strawberry valley to retrieve a special strawberry that will help cure Plue. After retrieving the strawberry, she is then confronted by an insect monster. Haru arrives to defeat the insect monster and to rescue Elie. When they went back, they saw that Plue was already back to normal. However, Elie realizes that the hot spring caused Plue's deflation.
10	"Sound of Thunder, Part 1" / "Thunderous Recollection"; Transliteration: "Raimei no Kioku" (Japanese: 雷鳴の記憶)	December 15, 2001	August 14, 2004
As they all continue to head toward Experiment City, a thunderstorm begins to downpour. The sight of thunder stirs up Elie's memory. They stop at a hotel in Ska Village for Elie to get some rest. Later on, she takes a hot shower to relax. The hotel manager, Lasagna, explains that the thunderstorm has been occurring for five years nonstop. Her son, Chino, believed that the frogs in the town causes this thunderstorm. However, it was really caused by Go, one who control thunder. Haru leaves to fight Go, and Elie leaves to recover her memory, as they both head toward Thunder Mansion.
11	"Sound of Thunder, Part 2" / "Dancing Hero"; Transliteration: "Danshingu Hīrō" (Japanese: ダンシングヒーロー)	December 22, 2001	August 21, 2004
Elie arrives at Thunder Mansion. Go mistakes Elie as the Rave Master. Go shows off his super strength and his good looks, which doesn't seem to impress Elie. Haru arrives at the Thunder Mansion, accidentally knocking Go unconscious. Rosa, able to make men dance uncontrollably, explains to Haru that Go is starring her in a movie in which is rains continuously. Elie and Rosa engage in a battle, tonfa blasters against chain sword. Rosa's chain sword becomes out of control, and Elie prevent it from doing any further damage. Go obtains consciousness and accidentally punches Rosa, blaming it on Haru. He then prepares to battle Haru, who happens to be worn out from constant dancing.
12	"Sound of Thunder, Part 3" / "Last Scene"; Transliteration: "Rasuto Shīn" (Japanese: ラストシーン)	December 29, 2001	August 28, 2004
Haru must destroy the Shadow Stone place in the middle of Go's hammer. Elie memory is jogged once again, which causes her to throw Plue into the hammer, breaking the Shadow Stone and the hammer. Due to this, Go is asked to stop the rain. He brings out a machine that caused the rain, having six unlabeled buttons. Since Go doesn't remember which button stops the rain, Plue pushes one of them, being successful. As Haru, Elie, Plue were about to leave, Go mentions to them about Sieg Hart, who is an elemental master, the person in Elie's memory. Ska Village returns to normal, with a clear blue sky. Meanwhile, Shuda is searching for a Rave Stone in Tremolo Mountain.
13	"Under Tremolo Mountain, Part 1" / "Land of Falling Stars"; Transliteration: "Hoshifuri no Chi" (Japanese: 星降りの地)	January 5, 2002	September 4, 2004
Haru, Elie, Plue, and Griff make their way toward Tremolo Mountain in search of the Rave Stone. However, they soon realize that Shuda is there as well. Plue runs off in a nearby forest, and Haru sets out to look for Plue. Haru then encounters Deerhound, a talking bear, who gives him advice upon entering Tremolo Mountain. Meanwhile, Elie took suits from a few of the Shadow Guard as a disguise for her and Haru to gain access inside Tremolo Mountain. Once inside the caves and tunnels, Haru and Elie get caught in their disguise. They quickly run for cover, but they end up in a dead end. Haru and Elie jumps off a cliff, using Griff's ability to shape-shift to land safely. The flowers on the ground nearby emit pollen that causes them to sleep. Schneider, a doctor though really an assassin, inflames the flowers, seemingly saving them. Schneider offers to help them find the Rave Stone.
14	"Under Tremolo Mountain, Part 2" / "Mysterious Assassin"; Transliteration: "Nazo no Ansatsusha" (Japanese: 謎の暗殺者)	January 12, 2002	September 11, 2004
Schneider gets Haru, Elie, Plue, and Griff lost in the caves and tunnels of Tremolo Mountain. While they decide to rest for a while, Schneider attempts to murder Haru. Much to his chagrin, he is stopped by Musica in the disguise of a Shadow Guard. Musica explains that he came to Tremolo Mountain to take the Rave Stone for himself. Haru then has a match against Musica, but Elie intervenes. Musica decides to help the others in finding the Rave Stone. Plue helps them find a secret passageway. An inception on a wall, written in an ancient language tells that the Rave Stone is inside. Once inside, they are confront by a Knight of the Blue Sky.
15	"Under Tremolo Mountain, Part 3" / "The Second Rave"; Transliteration: "Dai-ni no Reivu" (Japanese: 第2のレイヴ)	January 19, 2002	September 18, 2004
The Knight of the Blue Sky happens to be Deerhound, who is not convinced that Haru is the Rave Master. To prove that he is the Rave Master, he must fight against Deerhound, showing his skills of the Rave Stone. Deerhound explains that he was human in the past, fighting alongside Shiba to destroy all the Shadow Stones. Deerhound then shows Haru the graveyard of all the Symphonia warriors that risked their lives to destroy the Shadow Stones. Deerhound gives Haru the Rave of Knowledge, but Deerhound is then stabbed by Schneider. Haru uses the Rave of Knowledge to defeat Schneider. Deerhound tell that Haru should collect all the Rave Stones to unlock all the powers the sword contains. Haru swears to obtain peace by the power of the Rave Stones, and Deerhound returns to his grave.
16	"Fortress in Flight, Part 1" / "Clash! Vanish Field"; Transliteration: "Kettō! Banisshu Fīrudo" (Japanese: 決闘! バニュッシュフィールド)	January 26, 2002	October 2, 2004
After the deerhound returned to his grave, Shuda appears and tells Haru that to be stronger he's got to get rid of his weakness, then attacks him and destroys the graves of the soldiers by using his explosive power, also destroying the cave. Later Shuda reveals what he was hiding underground then continuing their match
17	"Fortress in Flight, Part 2" / "Shuda, Disappearing in the Sky"; Transliteration: "Shuda, Tenkū ni Chiru" (Japanese: シュダ 天空に散る)	February 2, 2002	October 9, 2004
Haru and Shuda continue their battle, while Musica fights against Poosya and Rugar alone. Rugar uses his Delta Cannon and Poosya uses his Glue Tear in combination, putting Musica on edge. Elie wakes up to distract Poosya and Rugar, enabling Musica to defeat them both. Haru figures out that Shuda cannot use the Explosive Flame Ballet at close range, since it explodes at the area around the target. However, Shuda uses the Explosive Flame Ballet regardless, causing a massive explosion. Meanwhile, Elie, Musica, Plue, and Griff finds an underground base, where Poosya and Rugar were hiding. Rugar sets the underground base to self-destruct. Later on, as both Haru and Shuda are weakened, Haru defeats Shuda, using all the strength he can muster. As Shuda admits defeat, his launches himself from the floating platform, by using the Explosive Flame Ballet to explode his arm.
18	"Fortress in Flight, Part 3" / "Five Seconds to Rhapsodia Detonation"; Transliteration: "Rapusodia Bakuhatsu Go-byō Mae" (Japanese: ラプソディア爆発5秒前)	February 9, 2002	October 16, 2004
In the underground base, Musica soon realizes that Rugar preventing the self-destruct sequence from being cancelled. Haru lands in the base, badly wounded. Haru, Elie, Musica, Plue, and Griff manage to find an old war plane, flying off seconds before self-destruction. The plane capacity, however, is overweighted, as it dives into the forest. Fortunately, Hebi comes to the rescue at the last second. Jegan and Reina are introduced. The two discuss with Sieg Hart about Shuda's failure to obtain the Rave of Knowledge, and the assignment for the annihilation of Haru. Meanwhile, Haru, Elie, Musica, Plue, and Griff go to a hotel to relax and then to a restaurant to eat.
19	"Out of Time, Part 1" / "Woman #3173"; Transliteration: "3173 no Onna" (Japanese: 3173の女)	February 16, 2002	October 23, 2004
Haru, Elie, Musica, Plue, and Griff go to the beach to have some fun. They then all go to the Symphonia Museum, where there is rumors about the legend of the Rave Master. There are paintings that depict Shiba and Plue fifty years ago. Later on, Elie begins to experience dizziness, as she unwillingly leads herself in a room displaying a portrait that resembles her, seeing that her name is Resha Valentine. She then remembers that she visited Resha's grave. Meanwhile, Sieg Hart says to Reina that he must kill Elie since she has the power of Etherion, even though he was assigned to kill Haru. Sieg Hart then senses Elie's presence and begins to look for her from the sky. Haru, Musica, Plue, and Griff encounter a fortune teller than predicts a bad fate for Elie. Elie wanders off in the city, in tears of her memory.
20	"Out of Time, Part 2" / "Elie's Tragedy..."; Transliteration: "Erī no Higeki..." (Japanese: エリーの悲劇…)	February 23, 2002	October 30, 2004
Sieg Hart finds Elie, not knowing how he is connected to her past. Sieg Hart explains to Elie that she is an experiment in the Etherion Project. Haru, Musica, Plue, and Griff continue to search for Elie, Hebi informs them that she is with who seems to be Sieg Hart. Sieg Hart attempts to kill Elie using Sinclaire, but the power of Etherion manages to keep her alive until she collapses. Haru goes back to the fortune teller to receive help to locate Elie.
21	"Out of Time, Part 3" / "Clash! Haru vs. Sieg Hart"; Transliteration: "Gekitotsu! Haru tai Jīku Haruto" (Japanese: 激突! ハル対ジークハルト)	March 2, 2002	November 6, 2004
As Sieg Hart prepares to deliver the final blow to Elie, Haru arrives to intervene. Meanwhile, the fortune teller finds Musica, Plue, and Griff to warn them that the future is unfortunate for Haru and Elie, beginning the search for them. Haru reminisces on his memories of Elie since they first met. Elie becomes comatose, due to her weakened state. Haru struggles as he engages in combat against Sieg Hart. Sieg Hart remembers why he was assigned to kill Haru.
22	"Out of Time, Part 4" / "Runesave, the Sealing Sword"; Transliteration: "Fūin no Ken: Rūnseibu" (Japanese: 封印の剣 ルーンセイブ)	March 9, 2002	November 13, 2004
Haru absorbs the power of Etherion from Elie to his sword. This causes his attacks to be very effective against Sieg Hart. Reina remembers why she was ordered to watch over Sieg Hart. Sieg Hart explains to Haru that Elie is an experiment in the Etherion Project. He later explains about how Resha used the power of Etherion to cause a worldwide destruction that happened fifty years ago. Haru vows that he will save both Elie and the world from the power of Etherion, which doesn't convince the pessimistic Sieg Hart. Sieg Hart then summons Altealice, the element of the universe, to alter time and space into nothingness. Musica, Plue, and Griff continue to search for Haru and Elie. Elie wakes up from her comatose state.
23	"Out of Time, Part 5" / "Etherion Awakens"; Transliteration: "Ēterion Kakusei" (Japanese: エーテリオン覚醒)	March 16, 2002	November 20, 2004
Haru is trapped in the Altealice. He encounters an illusion of Sakura Glory, his mother, as she changes into a pillar of fire. He then encounters an illusion of Cattleya Glory, his sister, as she changes into a pool of water. This traumatizes Haru. Reina stabs Sieg Hart with her sword, calling him a traitor. Musica, Plue, and Griff find Sieg Hart and Reina, asking for the whereabouts of Haru and Elie. Surprisingly, Elie entered the Altealice, spoiling Sieg Hart's plan to keep them both separated. Elie tries her best to snap Haru out of his traumatic state. Altealice is destroyed after Elie comes in contact with Haru, awakening the power of Etherion. Haru uses his sword on Elie to seal the power of Etherion.
24	"Out of Time, Part 6" / "A Promise to Elie"; Transliteration: "Erī to no Yakusoku" (Japanese: エリーとの約束)	March 23, 2002	December 4, 2004
Reina comes after Haru, using Spear Rain. She attacks Haru multiple times, but Haru stands his ground. Musica attempts to fight her, however Jegan arrives to interrupt the fight and summon her back to headquarters. Sieg Hart explains that Reina and Jegan, are part of the Oracion Six, a group of elite warriors and leaders of the Shadow Guard. He requests they Haru and the others should go to Lyric Continent and acquire the Rave of Combat. Meanwhile, the Oracion Six will be summoned for a meeting at headquarters.
25	"Singing the Blues" / "Farewell, Song Continent"; Transliteration: "Saraba Songu Tairiku" (Japanese: さらばソング大陸)	March 30, 2002	December 11, 2004
Haru, Elie, Musica, Plue, and Griff head to Blues City. They are to take a train to Lyric Continent, however the train scheduled was robbed by the Big Butt Bandits, who are planning to go to Lyric Continent as well. Musica explores the city, reminisces on his memories there. He reunites with Melodia, spending the day together. Musica is caught between going with Haru and Elie to Lyric Continent, or staying with Melodia at Blues City. Musica ultimately chooses to go to Lyric Continent.

=== Season 2 ===
No.	Title	Original release date	English air date
26	"Bandits Behind" / "Bandits! The Jiggle Butt Gang " Transliteration: "Daigotō! Ketsupuri-dan" (Japanese: 大強盗!ケツプリ団)	April 6, 2002	January 22, 2005
On the way to Lyric Continent, Griff is caught by the Big Butt Bandits, leaving him tied up. The Big Butt Bandits are planning to activate a device from the roof of the train to send a foul smell throughout the train, enabling them to steal all the jewels worn by the aristocrats. However, Haru and Plue decide to go to the roof, thereby meeting the Big Butt Bandits. Plue sits on the device, causing a panic among the Big Butt Bandits. The Rear Admiral, the leader of the bandits converses with Haru on each other's life stories, while the other two bandits, Cheeks and Rumpy, attempt to deactivate the device. To no avail, they leave Haru with Plue drinking apple juice sitting on the device, as they encounter Elie, Musica, and Griff. The Big Butt Bandits decide to jump off the train into the ocean. Plue spilt apple juice on the device, causing it to deactivate. After Haru and Plue return inside the train, Elie, Musica, and Griff complain about the Big Butt Bandits.
27	"Under Desert Sands, Part 1" / "Ray Barrier, the Hidden City"; Transliteration: "Kekkai no Miyako: Rābaria" (Japanese: 結界の都 ラーバリア)	April 13, 2002	January 29, 2005
While roaming through a desert, Haru, Elie, Musica, Plue, and Griff find themselves in quicksand. As they all fall through the quicksand, they land in a river in Ray Barrier City. They meet Solasido and Fura, as they explain that they are protectors of Ray Barrier City. They further explains that a monster army would break the barrier to attack them. As the monster army breaks the barrier, Solasido and Fura prepare to fight back. Solasido figures out that Haru is after the Rave of Combat, and that he must go to see Remi Maltese, the granddaughter of Claire Maltese, a Knight of the Blue Sky. Remi explains that the monster army want to possess the Rave of Combat. She requests Haru to work with Solasido and Fura to fight against the monsters, but Haru declines the offer. It is revealed that Gale, Haru's father, is the leader of this army. Haru witnesses that Gale and his army are planning to attack the Tower of Din very soon.
28	"Under Desert Sands, Part 2" / "Fateful Bonds"; Transliteration: "Unmei no Kizuna" (Japanese: 運命の絆)	April 20, 2002	February 5, 2005
Haru fights his way through all the monsters. Zashippe, a cyclops possessing a Shadow Stone, appears and begins to battle Haru. Zashippe has the ability to travel underground, but Haru manages to defeat him regardless. Haru fights his way through the remaining monsters, easily defeating them. As he runs toward the tower, more monsters restrain him, which forces him to use his sword again. In a weakened state, Haru collapses. Meanwhile, Elie, Musica, Plue, Griff, Remi, Solasido, and Fura are searching for Haru. They realize that Gale is Haru's father. After he gathers some strength in him, Haru encounters Gale, who begins to attack him.
29	"Under Desert Sands, Part 3" / "Boss of Monsters, Gale!"; Transliteration: "Majin no Atama Geiru!" (Japanese: 魔人の頭ゲイル!)	April 27, 2002	February 12, 2005
Haru realizes that Gale was attacking Zashippe, saving Haru's life. Gale Glory charges at Gale "King" Raregroove, the leader of the Oracion Six. being evenly matched. It is revealed that King is Gale's parallel self. King is actually the real leader of the monster army, not Gale. King explains that the Shadows Stones are created once a year at the Tower of Din. King uses Black Zenith, however Gale is able to dodge the attack. King uses Enclaim on the Tower of Din, causing the tower and the land surrounding it to transform. Haru and Gale plan to work together to defeat King, and they make their way inside the tower. Meanwhile, Elie, Musica, Plue, Griff, Remi, Solasido, and Fura find the tower in the transformed state, but are caught by some monsters. As they prepare to fight, Shuda arrives to take the monsters out. He leaves, telling them to go to the Tower of Din to find Haru and Gale.
30	"In the Tower of Din, Part 1" / "Tremble! The Five Palace Guardians"; Transliteration: "Senritsu! Ōkyū Shugoshin" (Japanese: 戦慄! 王宮守五神)	May 4, 2002	February 19, 2005
As Haru and Gale travel inside the Tower of Din, Gale realize how worn out Haru really is. Gale give him a special elixir that rejuvenates Haru's strength. As Haru and Gale run up the stairs to the top floor of the tower, Haru wonders why Gale hasn't contacted him in so long. Meanwhile, Elie, Musica, Plue, Griff, Remi, Solasido, and Fura are in the tower as well, also making their way to the top floor. On the top floor, King summons the Palace Guardians with a Shadow Stone. He ordered them to annihilate everyone in the Tower of Din. Haru and Gale are faced obstacles, causing them to be separated. Since the staircase is destroyed from obstacles, the others are trapped as well. However, Elie leads the group to another staircase out of intuition. Gale tries the punch out the walls that separated him from Haru, however Haru tells Gale to go ahead to fight King. Then Haru encounters the Palace Guardians. The Palace Guardians display their unique abilities, putting Haru at edge. Gale finds King, who is angry at Gale's betrayal as a member of the Shadow Guard, and they begin to battle, settling their differences.
31	"In the Tower of Din, Part 2" / "Final Countdown"; Transliteration: "Fainaru Kauntodaun" (Japanese: ファイナルカウントダウン)	May 11, 2002	February 26, 2005
Let, the second most powerful Palace Guardian, interferes with Ron Glace, another Palace Guardian, from battling Haru. Rionette, another Palace Guardian, restricts Haru from moving, allowing Ron Glace to charge right at him. But they all are intercepted by Elie's tonfa blasters, recognizing the arrival of the others. An hourglass displays behind the Palace Guardians, stating that there is one hour left until the Enclaim ritual is complete. Haru and the others attempt to stop this, and they race toward Palace Guardians to attempt to defeat them. However, Ltiangle, the leader of the Place Guardians sends them all to another dimension. It is explained that everyone has separated in groups to the Prison of Spirits, where each of them are in an hallucination of their combined homelands. Musica and Solasido help defeat Ron Glace. Musica figures out that Clare possesses the Rave of Combat, not Remi. Solasido says that Remi is his younger sister. Ltiangle appears and shows a defeated Fura. Solasido goes to search for a link in the dimensions. Haru faces against Let. Elie, Remi, Plue, and Griff are struggling against Rionette. Musica is left to fight Ltiangle.
32	"In the Tower of Din, Part 3" / "The Fifth Sword, Blue Crimson " Transliteration: "Dai Go no Ken: Burū Kurimuzon" (Japanese: 第5の剣 ブルークリムゾン)	May 18, 2002	March 5, 2005
Rionette grabs Remi by her head, while Elie, Plue, and Griff panic. Solasido manages to find them, releasing Remi from Rionette's grip. Solasido says that since his homeland is the same to that of Remi, he was able to find a link to their dimensions. Elie, Solasido, Plue, and Griff all work together to destroy Rionette's Shadow Stone. Meanwhile, while Haru is still battling Let, he notices that Let refuses to use his Shadow Stone to fight back. In fact, Let only cares about winning or losing, not about good or evil. Let manages to break Haru's sword, but Haru manages to create a separate sword from the broken end, having swords of fire and ice. After Let is defeat, Racas, the last Palace Guardian, steps in to fight. Racas is able to counterattack Haru's attacks, as he is able to read Haru's mind. Elsewhere, Musica struggles as he fights against Ltiangle.
33	"In the Tower of Din, Part 4" / "Knight of the Blue Sky, Clea"; Transliteration: "Sōten Shisenshi Kurea" (Japanese: 蒼天四戦士クレア)	May 25, 2002	March 12, 2005
Musica figures out that Ltiangle can turn objects invisible. Musica strategically strangles Ltiangle with his weapon, causing his defeat, but Musica ends up badly wounded. Meanwhile, Haru uses his sword to seal his mind for a second, allowing him to defeat Racas. This terminates the Prison of Spirits, as the group returns to the Tower of Din. Haru tells everyone else to head back to Ray Barrier City, while he prepares to fight alongside Gale against King. As they depart, Plue runs back to catch up to Haru. Claire, taking the form of a talking eagle, in a weaken state encounters the remaining group, noticing how Elie has a striking resemblance to Resha. Claire gives the Rave of Combat to Elie, so she can give it to Haru. Claire returns to her grave, as she says her farewells to Remi and the others.
34	"The Enclaim, Part 1" / "Gale and King"; Transliteration: "Geiru to Kingu" (Japanese: ゲイルとキング)	June 1, 2002	March 26, 2005
Haru arrives to help Gale defeat King within minutes until the Enclaim ritual is complete. Haru realizes that King's sword is similar to his. After the Enclaim ritual ends, King says that the Shadow Stone produced is within Gale's body. Ten years ago, it is explained how Gale and King founded the Shadow Guard, how Gale left the Shadow Guard, and how he came back to attempt to put an end to the Shadow Guard. It is past, it is revealed that King was arrested, while his wife and son were shot on sight.
35	"The Enclaim, Part 2" / "Reasons to Fight"; Transliteration: "Tatakau Wake" (Japanese: 戦う理由)	June 8, 2002	April 2, 2005
After King was arrested, he manages to escape, attacking Haru. King sent a letter to Sakura, actually luring her to Gale. Sakura comes running to Gale, but was ultimately killed by King. It is then that King implants a Shadow Stone within Gale's body. In the present, Haru sobs in anguish after hearing this story. Haru is convinced to fight with Gale against King. After King causes an explosion, Elie runs into them. She gives the Rave of Combat to Haru, but it was intentionally meant for Plue.
36	"The Enclaim, Part 3" / "Beyond the Sorrowful Sky..."; Transliteration: "Kanashiki Sora no Mukou ni..." (Japanese: 哀しき空の向こうに…)	June 15, 2002	April 9, 2005
After Plue obtains the Rave of Combat, his powers are well demonstrated against King's attacks. Using Plue's power as a distraction, Haru gains the upper hand, resulting in King's defeat. But King does not give up, as he uses Monster Prison to seal his body within his Shadow Stone. This transforms his body into a beast-like form, increasing his power. His strength, however, destroys the Tower of Din. Later on, King badly injures Haru, making him unconscious. Gale tells Elie to take Haru and Plue to a safe place, leaving him to fight with King alone. Nonetheless, Haru returns to assist Gale in the final blow, finishing him off.
37	"The Enclaim, Part 4" / "Farewell, My Friend!"; Transliteration: "Saraba Tomoyo!" (Japanese: さらば友よ!)	June 22, 2002	April 16, 2005
Since not giving up King attempts to punch Gale in a weakened state, but all his strength is depleted. King plans to use Warp Road to summon the Oracion Six to him. However, he activates Warp Road by transferring an explosion, seen from various surrounding cities, to Shadow Guard headquarters, seemingly annihilating the Oracion Six. King then desperately tries to break the Shadow Stone embedded in his chest, thereby releasing the seal of Monster Prison. He rests in peace after admitting defeat. The Tower of Din later starts to fall apart, and Let shows up to accompany Haru, Elie, Gale, and Plue out of the tower.
38	"The Enclaim, Part 5" / "Star Memory"; Transliteration: "Hoshi no Kioku" (Japanese: 星の記憶)	June 29, 2002	April 23, 2005
Haru and Gale fall through the collapsing surface, being separated Elie, Let, and Plue. Let unexpectedly disappears from Elie and Plue, and Solasido and Remi meets with them. Trapped underground, they dig their way through. Gale tells Haru that he will understand the truth about Elie. Haru asks why Gale never contacted him and Cattleya for so long. Haru starts to lose oxygen, motivating Gale to hammer through the surface to receive air. Gale talks about the Memory of the Stars, explaining that all questions are answered within the multitude of stars. As the tower begins to cave in on them, Gale huddles over Haru to protect him from falling debris. Haru begins to have a dream. In the dream, Gale appears and gives Haru three choices. He is either to continue to search for the Rave, to help restore Elie's memory, or to go back to Garage Island to see Cattleya again. However, Haru swears that he will complete all three missions.
39	"Origins: Shiba" / "Birth of Rave"; Transliteration: "Reivu Tanjō" (Japanese: RAVE誕生)	July 6, 2002	April 30, 2005
Shiba tells about his encounter with Resha and Plue in Symphonia fifty-one years ago. He was a knight at the time. He met Resha in the night performance a dance in the moonlight. They parted ways after introducing themselves. The next days he was put in charge of the Knights of the Blue Sky. They are assigned to guard the possessor of the power of Etherion, which Shiba later finds out to be Resha. After finding this out, he demanded to see her in order to release her from her confinement, resulting in a debate. He then met Garein, asking to have a sword made to beat the knights, but Garein disapproved. Later that night, Resha appeared to him, and he helped her escape her custody. Shiba offered for her to run away with him, but she declined. She left, and it began to downpour heavily with rain. The Knights of the Blue Sky come to him, holding Plue and giving him the Rave. He was informed that Resha died. This inspired him to fight off those influenced by the Shadow Stones. Garein made a sword for Shiba specialized for the Rave, in order to embark on the journey ahead.
40	"Origins: Sir Plue" / "0065 Plue Legend"; Transliteration: "0065 Puru Regendo" (Japanese: 0065ブルー・レジェンド)	July 13, 2002	May 7, 2005
Griff tells about his encounter with Plue on Griffon Island a year before meeting Haru. Plue appears to be stranded on the island, desperately trying to swim his way out. Griff was patrolling the ocean at the time, keeping a sharp eye out for the Pudding Heads. However he sees Plue being toyed by a couple of dolphins in the ocean. Griff brings him back onto the island, noticing how hungry he is. Griff takes him to a candy factory, offering him a lollipop, which Plue immediately takes a liking to. Griff introduces Mikan, Isa, and Teppei, his crew members. Soon after the Pudding Heads begin their invasion on Griffon Island, dropping bombs of pudding and launching cannons of mousse from a pirate ship. After seeing that Griff and his crew are brave and courageous for protecting the island, Plue launches himself in front of the ship, using all his strength to halt the ship. After the ship increases its engines to full throttle, the ship explodes as a result. Plue lands in a lifeboat, however it begins to fall apart. Sinking deep into the water, Plue sees bait similar to the lollipop he had on Griffon Island, After taking the bait, he met Haru, as this is where their journey begins.
41	"Sideshow" / "Deadly Road Performance"; Transliteration: "Kesshi no Rojō Pafōmansu" (Japanese: 決死の路上パフォーマンス)	July 20, 2002	May 21, 2005
Musica is finally released from hospitalization after being badly wounded in the Tower of Din. Remi and Solasido depart. Let appears and tells Haru, Elie, and Musica that they must gather all the Rave Stones to open up a path the Memory of the Stars. They then prepare to head off to Symphonia. However, Plue and Griff raid a candy store, Plue eating all the lollipops and Griff eating all the pudding, reminded of their past. This causes trouble, as Haru, Elie, and Musica are forced to pay off their debt caused by Plue and Griff. So they decide to become temporary street performers. Their performance was deemed a failure, until they included Plue in their act. Elsewhere, Sieg Hart wonders why Elie has the face of Resha and the power of Etherion. He prepares to head off to Symphonia as well.
42	"All Aboard (Part 1)" / "Air Casino, Edel Lake"; Transliteration: "Kūchū Kajino: Ederu Reiku" (Japanese: 空中カジノ エーデルレイク)	July 27, 2002	May 28, 2005
Haru, Elie, Musica, Let, Plue, and Griff are aboard the airship of the Silver Rhythm Gang. Let explains that to get to Symphonia, one must pass through the Annihilation Storm using a tunned called the Emperor Gate, for a toll to pay. Later on, an air casino hovers over the airship, docking them inside. Haru, Elie, Musica, Let, Plue, and Griff enter the casino in formal attire. Unfortunately, the Big Butt Bandits are also aboard the air casino. Let notices a familiar crest symbol from a familiar group.. Musica and Griff are unable to get a sponsor to help pay for the toll. The Big Butt Bandits plan to marry three rich ladies in order to get rich quick. However, after the Rear Admiral reunites with Plue, he and the other bandits realizes they were going to marry for the sake of money, not love. Meanwhile, Ruby, a talking penguin, wants to capture Plue as a deposit for the Doryu Raid Squad.
43	"All Aboard (Part 2)" / "The Jiggle Butt Gang's Great Strikeback!"; Transliteration: "Ketsupuri-dan Dai Gyakushū" (Japanese: ケツプリ団の大逆襲)	August 3, 2002	June 4, 2005
Let figures out that the Doryu Raid Squad is aboard the ship, and he informs Musica and Griff. Franken Blily and Lilith, two members of the Doryu Raid Squad, spot Plue with Haru and Elie. Lilith uses Wind Festival to act as a sleeping potion for all the casino guests. They capture Plue to give to Ruby, leaving Haru and Elie tied up. Musica, Let, and Griff notices that Plue is captured. However, they all are interrupted by the Big Butt Bandits. Lilith causes them to panic, slicing their guns with her hair. After the Big Butt Bandits retreat out of fear, Rumpy accidentally steps on his gun, making it fire rapidly, freeing Plue from being caged. Unfortunately, Franken Billy has Plue in his hands now. Since Ruby sees that Plue was captured, rather than collected, he tells Franken Billy to release Plue. However, Franken Billy disobeys, dragging Ruby along with him. Franken Billy explains that the Doryu Raid Squad is after the fortune of Ruby's father. The Big Butt Bandits manage to find Haru and Elie, still being tied up and asleep. Nonetheless, the bandits seems to be trapped in the room with Haru and Elie. They resolve the problem by passing gas so much that it spreads throughout the air casino, causing everyone to be alerted of the smell.
44	"All Aboard (Part 3)" / "Death Storm Breakthrough!"; Transliteration: "Desu Sutōmu Toppa!" (Japanese: デスストーム突破!)	August 10, 2002	June 12, 2005
Hebi enters the air casino in a gas mask, to take the crew back onto the airship of the Silver Rhythm Gang. Plue requests that Ruby show board the airship as well. Ruby says that he owns the Emperor Gate, therefore allowing them to waive the toll, which relieves them personally and financially. As they approach the Annihilation Storm, the Doryu Raid Squad come behind them and destroys the Emperor Gate. However, the airship of the Silver Rhythm Gang precede to go through the Annihilation Storm. As the storm worsens, Haru and Plue stay outside on the main deck of the ship, while the others go inside in the superstructure of the ship. When a tsunami emerges, Haru uses his sword to divide water, creating a path towards Symphonia. Meanwhile, the Northern General of Symphonia, Deep Snow, releases a very dangerous prisoner after ten years of imprisonment, who murders several criminal organizations en route to Symphonia.
45	"The Shadow Master" / "Advent, The Dark Bring Master"; Transliteration: "Korin: Dāku Buringu Masutā" (Japanese: 降臨 ダークブリングマスター)	August 17, 2002	June 19, 2005
The crew lands on Symphonia, but they find themselves in a wasteland. So they decide to set out and explore. However, Elie begins to experience headaches as the group continues to walk. Let determines that her headaches are the path to finding out more about the Rave Stones. So the group rely on Elie to guide the way, but the headaches increase as they go on. Plue uses the Rave of Combat to sense a map illuminating on the ground. This map shows the current locations of all five Rave Stones as well as five Shadow Stones. They encounter the mysterious prisoner, who says that he is on a journey to collect the five Shadow Stones in order to go to the Memory of the Stars. The prisoner displays flags of criminal organizations that he defeated, putting the group in shock. He then introduces himself as the Shadow Master, being the adversary of the Rave Master. The Shadow Master approaches Elie and kisses her on the lips, much to everyone's shock, especially Haru's.
46	"Return of the Oracion Six, Part 1" / "Comeback! The Oración Seis"; Transliteration: "Fukkatsu!! Orashion Seisu" (Japanese: 復活!! 六祈将軍(オラシオンセイス))	August 23, 2002	June 26, 2005
When the Shadow Master kisses Elie on the lips, the others become exasperated. As the Shadow Master takes his leave, the Oracion Six appear. It is revealed that the Oracion Six foresaw that King would destroy the Shadow Guard headquarters, as they were conducting a plan of their own elsewhere at the time. The Oracion Six had originally schemed to track the whereabouts of the Shadow Master. However, they decide to eliminate Elie first, since the kiss of the Shadow Master released the immeasurable and vast power and energy of the partially sealed Etherion within her. Haru, Musica, and Let attempt to attack Julius, a member of the Oracion Six, but to no avail, as he has the ability to manipulate the element of ice. Then Berial, another member of the Oracion Six, has the ability to manipulate the earth, turning the desert into a canyon, separating the group. Elie testifies that she is eager to fight for and with the others, causing an inspiration toward the others. Let performs a ritual to release the inner dragon within him, as he prepares to fight Jegan, another member of the Oracion Six.
47	"Return of the Oracion Six, Part 2" / "The Truth of Dragon Race"; Transliteration: "Doragon Reisu no Shinjitsu" (Japanese: 竜人(ドラゴンレイス)の真実)	August 31, 2002	July 3, 2005
The result of the ritual transforms Let into a humanoid form, forfeiting his dragon body. Jegan reveals that Julia, Let's love interest, performed the same ritual in the past, however she transformed into a dragon, forfeiting the human mind. In a memory-flashback, Let witnesses Julia's death and the destruction of the Dragon Village caused by Jegan. Jegan, who has the ability to absorb energy and manipulate plant life, explains that Julia's death in the past was an illusion. After Julia believed that she was abandoned by Let, she turned to Jegan for comfort and support. One year later, Jegan and Julia returned to the village, and the ritual was performed for Julia. However, it was then that she turned into a dragon, rather than a human being. In the present, Jegan merges Let in a tree, using Yggdrassil, causing his defeat. Meanwhile, Berial uses G-Earth to demonstrate his incredibly powerful earth-control-and-manipulation abilities to Haru. Julius uses Armure D'Etoile to demonstrate his ice manipulation to Elie, Plue, Griff, and Ruby. Reina uses Silver Claimer to demonstrates her silver-controlling/manipulating abilities to Musica.
48	"Return of the Oracion Six, Part 3" / "Sorrowful Silver Claimers"; Transliteration: "Kanashiki Shiruba Kureimā" (Japanese: 悲しき銀術師(シルバークレイマー))	September 7, 2002	July 10, 2005
Reina is seeking the mystically powerful Silver Ray, just like Musica is. Reina has evidence that Musica has knowledge of the whereabouts of the Silver Ray. Musica fathoms that the Silver Ray is a ship that is configured as a weapon. When Reina was younger, her father was accused of stealing the Silver Ray, thereby was put into custody. When she was older, King came to her, offering the Silver Claimer, which she used in order to seek vengeance against the arrest of her father. In the present, Musica convinces Reina that the location of the Silver Ray is still unknown. However, Reina begins to attack Music relentlessly, using both the Silver Claimer and the White Kiss, causing his defeat. Elsewhere, Berial lower the ground so Haru can see the struggle of Elie against Julius. Jegan and Reina announce that Let and Musica were defeated.
49	"Return of the Oracion Six, Part 4" / "At the End of Battle"; Transliteration: "Tatakai no Hate Ni" (Japanese: 戦いの果てに)	September 14, 2002	July 17, 2005
Berial knocks Haru unconscious with ease, causing his defeat. Soon after, Jegan, Reina, and Berial observe the match between Elie and Julius. Catching Julius off guard, she manage to use her tonfa blasters at his face. Julius become aggressive, experiencing a temper tantrum. Griff attempts to run away, however Julius encased Elie in a coat of ice and launches her at Griff, Elie manages to break free, but she injures her arm in the process. Julius approaches Elie with a sword of ice, prepared to slash her. Suddenly, Griff jumps in the way to take the hit, cutting him in half. Seeing Griff in pieces, Elie unleashes a sample of the immeasurably vast destructive strength and power of her sealed Etherion, put the Oracion Six at shock. Haru wakes up from his comatose state and becomes furious at Julius and Berial. He uses his sword with expertise, blocking off the attacks of Reina, Julius, and Berial. However, Haru is caught off guard by Haja, the last member of the Oracion Six, as he falls unconscious next to Elie. The Oracion gather around the two, preparing to end their lives. Then, Sieghart arrives out of the blue and unleashes his tremendously strong magical abilities on the Oracion Seis, saving Haru and Elie from their demise.
50	"Further Mysteries, Part 1" / "Memory's Door"; Transliteration: "Kioku no Tobira" (Japanese: 記憶の扉)	September 21, 2002	July 24, 2005
Sieg Hart vows to protect Elie and the vastly limitless creative and destructive power of Etherion. With their combined strength, Haru, Elie, Musica, Let, and Sieg Hart manage to cause the Oracion Six to flee. Griff is able to regenerate, making Elie happy. Sieg Hart explains that the coordinates on Elie's left arm will assist on the collection of the remaining Rave Stones as well as the restoration of her memory. It is revealed that the name of the Shadow Master is Lucia Raregroove, the son of Gale "King" Raregroove. While Lucia was in prison for ten years, he obtained great magical power, knowledge, and information regarding everything correlating to the five Rave Stones and the five Shadow Stones. Sieghart says that Haru must gather all five Rave Stones and combine them all into one, with Elie using the vastly, immeasurable strength and energy of Etherion. Using the coordinates on her arm, the group heads north. Once there, they are surrounded by a forest. A skeleton appears in front of Elie, which traumatizes her.
51	"Further Mysteries, Part 2" / "Vow Towards the Future"; Transliteration: "Mirai e no Chikai" (Japanese: 未来への誓い)	September 28, 2002	July 31, 2005
The group find themselves within an advance spellbound barrier, secluded from the rest of Symphonia. They send Elie to venture deeper into the forest in order to reclaim her memory. She comes across the sepulcher of Resha. After the forest disappears, she walks back to the rest. She says to them that she had had the tremendously powerful magical ability of Etherion ever since she was a child. Meanwhile, the Oracion Six are arranging to construct a new headquarters, a new member, and attain Lucia as their new leader. Haja summons the sword of King, and he grants it to Lucia. Haru and Sieghart take an oath that their paths will cross again once all five of the mystical Rave Stones have been gathered. The group then set out to find the two remaining Rave Stones.
