= List of Sister Princess episodes =

This article is about episodes of the anime Sister Princess, divided into the two seasons. Since ADV only has the license for the first season, the English titles below for the first season are those officially given by ADV; those of the second season are just approximate translations taken from here.

== Sister Princess (1st season) ==
No.	Title	Original release date
1	"My Graduation"; Transliteration: "Boku no Guradyuēshon" (Japanese: 僕のグラデュエーション)	April 4, 2001
Wataru, the top student at his elite school, is in a depressive mood after failing to pass the entrance exam to a prestigious high school because of a computer glitch. The confident boy hadn't bothered to apply to any other schools, to the regret of his friend Akio and to the amusement of his rival Minai (who had always been second to Wataru). "It can't be true!" wails Wataru... and hardly for the last time. Unexpectedly and without reasonable explanation he then is evicted from his mansion and whisked off to a boarding school on Promised Island. On the boat he meets Yamada, a talkative self-important boy also new to the school, and Mami, a gruff girl who Wataru doesn't realize is assigned to spy on him. Debarking disastrously, Wataru nearly drowns but is rescued by a friendly girl named Karen. Once on the island, he seeks out a clothing store where he assists, and is assisted in shopping by, the glamorous and fashionable Sakuya. Clumsy cheerleader Kaho lifts his gloom and bewilderment, as does little girl Hinako, but Wataru suffers successive turns of fortune in seeking room and board. At the end, he is assigned to live at a manor house with Karen, Sakuya, Kaho, and Hinako, all of whom claim to be his younger sisters!
2	"I Love Big Brother So Much!"; Transliteration: "Onii-chan, Daisuki!" (Japanese: お兄ちゃん, 大好き!)	April 11, 2001
Wataru thinks this must all be a dream, because "it can't be true!" He is "Big Brother" to Karen, "Dear Brother" to Sakuya, "Brother" to young Kaho, and "Bro Bro" to younger Hinako. Despite their affection and charm he still investigates, vainly, for any way off the island and out of his surreal dream. Unexplained and spooky sounds and events around the house lead Wataru to meet his eight other sisters. All twelve are gathered together when Mami, the girl who is still tailing him, is spotted; and she lies and says she also is a sister of "Bud", making Wataru think he has 13 younger sisters!
3	"Being with Dear Brother"; Transliteration: "Onii-sama to Issho" (Japanese: お兄様といっしょ)	April 18, 2001
Wataru and his sisters attend their first day of school, but Wataru is feeling the pressure to watch over them. Everywhere he goes at least one of his sisters follows him wanting attention, and Wataru starts to feel overloaded. So he tries to leave the island but is thwarted by events as well as his own failure to learn to swim. Karen comes and convinces him to stay, and they go back to their house together. Meanwhile, Wataru's occultist sister, Chikage, is looking into her crystal ball; she says quietly to herself that there is danger in store for "Brother Darling."
4	"Where is Mr. Teddy Bear?"; Transliteration: "Kuma-san, doko?" (Japanese: くまさんどこ?)	April 25, 2001
Wataru helps Hinako, his youngest sister, search for a teddy bear that she saw in a dream she had. They go all around town in every store but cannot find the exact right bear. They finally give up, but Hinako says it's okay as long as she has her big brother around. Just then an elderly jogger comes and gives them a package that he thought Wataru dropped. Hinako opens it, and inside is her perfect bear.
5	"E-mailing with Bro \(^◇^)/"; Transliteration: "Aniki to Mēru \(^◇^)/" (Japanese: アニキとメール \(^◇^)/)	May 2, 2001
The sisters are beginning to be jealous about the numerous e-mail messages Wataru is exchanging, so they each get RinRin (the invention sister) to make them phones that can send e-mail so they can exchange mail with Wataru. Wataru gets frustrated at all the mail overload and about not having much time to himself, but the girls' innocence and cute messages cheer him up.
6	"Big Brother is a Prince."; Transliteration: "Onii-chan wa Ojii-sama" (Japanese: お兄ちゃんは王子様♥)	May 9, 2001
Wataru and 12 sisters plus Mami all see a contest to win a special prize and decide to try and win it by putting on a play Yamata wrote called the 12 gentle princesses. Wataru is cast as the prince, and all of the sister plus Mami and minus the occult sister each play the role of a different princess. The play fails and they lose, but they all get consolation prizes.
7	"Season of Love"; Transliteration: "Koisuru Kisetsu" (Japanese: 恋する季節)	May 16, 2001
Simple fun with the laundry turned into play wedding dresses as the sisters dress themselves up as brides. It is first hinted in this episode that Wataru will need to make some kind of choice between the 12 girls.
8	"One Day, Two of Us"; Transliteration: "Itsu no Hika Futari de" (Japanese: いつの日かふたりで)	May 23, 2001
Wataru spends a day with Marie, a gentle sister in chronic ill health. Marie becomes sick because of a downpour. Wataru vows to stay with her forever, and after a day or two of care and encouragement from "Brother Mine", Marie is completely better.
9	"Summer Has Come"; Transliteration: "Natsu ga Kimashita" (Japanese: 夏がきました)	May 30, 2001
Wataru spends his initial summer days with his sisters. They all go out to buy swimsuits and all the sisters each get one. Everyone, including creepy Yamada, joins in to clean the pool so they can splash around. Later, Wataru admits he does not know how to swim and decides to learn how.
10	"Do Your Best, Big Bro!"; Transliteration: "Gambatte, Anii!" (Japanese: 頑張って, あにぃ!)	June 6, 2001
Athletic and dauntless sister Mamoru trains her "Big Bro" Wataru to swim. Despite her unflagging support and his best efforts, he decides to give up, but when he thinks delicate sister Aria is floundering dangerously in the pool, his race to rescue her enables him to learn the doggy paddle.
11	"Secret Tour with Bro"; Transliteration: "Aniki to Shīkuretto Tsuā" (Japanese: アニキとシークレットツアー)	June 13, 2001
Wataru and his sisters set out in on an underwater tour in a submarine single-handedly constructed by Rin Rin. At first, the ocean is beautiful and everything is great, but a storm comes in and the submarine starts leaking. Wataru tries to patch it up, but he fails and everyone is scattered and ship-wreaked, leaving Wataru and Mami alone.
12	"Vacation is Love"; Transliteration: "Bakansu wa Rabu yo" (Japanese: バカンスはラブよ♥)	June 20, 2001
All 12 sisters plus Mami and Wataru are ship-wreaked on an unknown island together, where they find a large and well-stocked beach house. They decide to live there while they try to figure out where they are and how to get home, and have some fun while they're at it. RinRin finds and repairs a jet ski, and they all play in the water and on the beach. Everyone is having fun, but Wataru is the only one worried about getting home. When night comes, Wataru finds out that they've actually been on Paradise Island the whole time, just on the other side from where they were living before.
13	"Summer with Big Brother"; Transliteration: "Onii-chan to no Natsu" (Japanese: お兄ちゃんとの夏)	June 27, 2001
Wataru reminisces his time with his sisters so far. Just a recap episode, except for the very, very end where we get a glimpse of the elusive and mysterious little girl in the yellow hat who has appeared in the credits of every episode.
14	"True Feelings"; Transliteration: "Hontō no Kimochi" (Japanese: 本当のキモチ♥)	July 4, 2001
Wataru, feeling that he does not do enough for everyone, tells the sisters that if they have a request, he will grant it. Karen's request to have a lightbulb changed that illuminates a painting ends up with the two spending their time together.
15	"Aria's Ribbon"; Transliteration: "Aria nō Ribon" (Japanese: 亞里亞のおリボン)	July 11, 2001
The wind blows away Aria's ribbon (which her Mon Frère Wataru gave her). She is then accompanied by a strange old man to help her find it. Meanwhile, everyone is drawing something in the town as homework, and as Wataru is looking for something to draw, he notices Aria is gone and goes to look for her. Aria finds her ribbon in a tree and the old man vanishes as Wataru finds Aria. Wataru draws all his little sisters next to the tree, and Aria draws Wataru standing next to the tree with her ribbon tied to a branch.
16	"Kaho Will Do Her Best!"; Transliteration: "Kaho, Ganbaccahau!" (Japanese: 花穂, がんばっちゃう!)	July 18, 2001
Kaho continues to fumble on her cheerleading routine. She however tries her best to cheer for her brother in the autumn sports festival, and Wataru needs all the help he can get, being a nerd who is bad at sports. Wataru decides to enter the relay, but in the middle of the race he falls down and almost gives up, but Kaho's cheering encourages him to continue and everyone has fun even though they come in last.
17	"It's Moxibustion...Blush ♥"; Transliteration: "Okyū Desu wa... Po ♥" (Japanese: おキューですわ...ポッ♥)	July 25, 2001
Haruka, often shy around her Beloved Brother Wataru, tells him that her most fulfilling dream would be for him to take her out dancing at the ball; Wataru initially hedges but realizes how much it would mean to her, and agrees to take her if she will be content with any laughter his poor skills might bring upon them. Unfortunately, he sprains his ankle. All the sisters are concerned and wish they could help, but Haruka decides to take care of him in every way possible, and Wataru's ankle quickly heals—but not in time for the dance. However, Wataru takes her to the autumn festival as a consolation. When they later help a stranger recover his treasured memento of his deceased wife, the man gratefully reopens the grand hall he had operated for the dance that they had missed so that the two can enjoy dancing alone.
18	"....Eternal....Vow........"; Transliteration: "....Eikyō no....Chigiri wo........" (Japanese: ....永久の....契りを........)	August 1, 2001
Wataru is having a dream of Chikage, and when he wakes up, he sees his body still asleep on the bed. Freaking out, Wataru runs through walls trying to find someone who can see him, but no one can except for Chikage. Chikage says she can return him to normal if he first does a few things for her, and they proceed into another world where they have a trippy love scene, Chikage is kidnapped by the grim reaper, and they almost get married in a church. Wataru then returns to his body, and to the delight of all his sisters, wakes up.
19	"Boxed Lunch of Love"; Transliteration: "Ai no Obentō Desu no" (Japanese: 愛のお弁当ですのっ)	August 8, 2001
Shirayuki prepares bentos for everyone for their school lunches, and Yamada is jealous so he tells Shirayuki that Wataru is not getting enough nutrition in the hope that she will make too much and he'll get the leftovers. Yamada's plan works too well and she starts making too much for every meal until Wataru tells her that they need smaller portions.
20	"Christmas Love Destiny"	August 15, 2001
Wataru celebrates Christmas with his sisters. All 13 sisters prepare a christmas present for Wataru while he goes out shopping for one for them.
21	"Me Two to Bro \(^o^)/~♥" Transliteration: "Aniki ni me two \(^o^)/~♥" (Japanese: アニキにme two \(^o^)/~♥)	August 22, 2001
Rin Rin introduces her latest invention to Bro Wataru—a robot version of herself. She based it on all the sisters so that it would cook and clean and be graceful and strong so it could help Wataru with whatever he needs. RinRin reveals that she wants to study robotics in America, and that when she leaves, she wants there to be someone who can help Wataru out.
22	"Check it Out, Brother Dearest ♥"; Transliteration: "Anichama, Chekkidesu ♥" (Japanese: 兄チャマ, チェキデス♥)	August 29, 2001
Everyone notices that they each have an item missing, and Yotsuba decides that she will discover the culprit using her detective skills. While fixing dinner, Mami accidentally breaks a leg off of the music box, but hides the fact by making it look ok. Kaho comes by and bumps the music box, and when the leg falls off, she thinks she has broken it. Kaho tells Yotsuba and they take it to get fixed, but when they find out it will take a couple days, Yotsuba dresses up as the beautiful mysterious thief girl Clover and pretends to steal it to hide the fact that it's broken.
23	"The First Guest"; Transliteration: "Hajimete no Okyakusama" (Japanese: はじめてのお客様)	September 5, 2001
Wataru's friend Akio arrives at the island for a visit and all the sisters like him except for Mami, who hides and acts nervous. We find out that Akio is actually Mami's older brother, and that he is the one who has been e-mailing her orders, and that her orders are to force Wataru off the island using any means necessary. Mami refuses to do her brother's bidding any more, and Akio cold-heartedly tells her to just stay out of the way. When Wataru and Akio are about to go to sleep that night, Akio reveals to Wataru that he did not just come to visit. Akio tells Wataru that his high school accepted him, and he would not even have to start a year late. Akio came to take Wataru back to Tokyo.
24	"Premonition of a Farewell"; Transliteration: "Sayonara no Yokan" (Japanese: さよならの予感)	September 12, 2001
Akio tells Wataru that he had actually passed the exams. Wataru is not sure how he feels about this, and though Akio is pushing him to return to Tokyo, Wataru wants to decide for himself. He spends the whole day debating, and Akio tries to manipulate Mami into swaying Wataru. Eventually Wataru decides to leave for Tokyo, but Mami decides to abandon her horrible blood brother and stay on the island. Chikage gives Wataru her pendant, her most precious possession, making the parting seem final.
25	"I Want to See...Brother"; Transliteration: "Aitai... Onii-chan" (Japanese: あいたい...お兄ちゃん)	September 19, 2001
The sisters' house feels empty as they miss their brother and anticipate his return with all their hearts. Meanwhile, Wataru is back in Tokyo with Akio and is ready to forget his memories in Promised Island when Mami shows up, begging him to return. Even though Mami asks with all her heart, Wataru still refuses, though lost memories of a childhood promise Wataru made start to resurface.......
26	"Promised Island"; Transliteration: "Yakusoku no Shima" (Japanese: 約束の島)	September 26, 2001
Against Akio's expectations, Wataru returns to Promised Island for good. The sisters become so happy for his return that they cherish every moment with him. The only thing keeping it from being perfect is that Mami is still missing. A couple days later, when they start school, Mami returns as a new transfer student!!!! And to everyone's shock and surprise, Akio transfers to Promised Island as well in search of 'what is truly cool'.

There is also an episode 0 called Sister Princess Eve (シスター♥プリンセス 前夜祭) which was just a talk show/documentary which introduced the twelve sisters with their voice actresses. It was aired a week before the first episode (March 28, 2001).

== Sister Princess RePure (2nd season) ==
Except for the last episode, each episode is divided into two parts, labelled below as "A-side" and "B-side."

No.	Title	Original release date
1	"Heart Days"; Transliteration: "Hāto Deizu" (Japanese: ハートデイズ)	October 2, 2002
2	"The Secret Garden"; Transliteration: "Himitsu no Hanazono...na no!" (Japanese: 秘密の花園...なの!)	October 9, 2002
3	"The Temptation of Marron"; Transliteration: "Maron no Yūwaku" (Japanese: マロンの誘惑)	October 16, 2002
4	"Hehe, It's a Sleepover Day"; Transliteration: "Ehehe...Otomari no Hi desu" (Japanese: えへへ...お泊まりの日です)	October 23, 2002
5	"An Endless Wish to the Shooting Stars"; Transliteration: "Nagareru Hoshi ni Tsukinu Negai o" (Japanese: 流れる星につきぬ願いを)	October 30, 2002
6	"The Cup of Anii and Me"; Transliteration: "Anii to Boku no Magu Kappu" (Japanese: あにぃとボクのマグカップ)	November 6, 2002
7	"Magical Words"; Transliteration: "Mahō no Kotoba" (Japanese: 魔法の言葉)	November 13, 2002
8	"It's Visiting Day"; Transliteration: "Menkai-bina no desu!" (Japanese: 面会日なのです!)	November 20, 2002
9	"Are You Close to Me, Aniki?"; Transliteration: "Soba Ni Iru yome... Aniki" (Japanese: そばにいるよね...アニキ)	November 27, 2002
10	"The Red String of Fate"; Transliteration: "Unmei no Akai Ito" (Japanese: 運命の赤い糸)	December 4, 2002
11	"The Box of Memories"; Transliteration: "Omoide no Takarabako" (Japanese: 思い出の宝箱)	December 11, 2002
12	"Onii-sama's Restaurant"; Transliteration: "Onī-sama no Resutoran" (Japanese: お兄さまのレストラン)	December 18, 2002
13	"Pure Christmas"; Transliteration: "Pyua Kurisumasu" (Japanese: ピュアクリスマス)	December 25, 2002
