= List of The Cramp Twins episodes =

This is an episode list of The Cramp Twins, a Cartoon Network European original animated series created by Brian Wood. The series aired on Cartoon Network Europe in European countries and on CBBC in the United Kingdom from 2001 to 2004 and on Cartoon Network in the United States from June 14, 2004 to 2005.

== Series overview ==
Season	Episodes	Originally released	
Season	Episodes	First released	Last released
1	26	June 14, 2004	July 19, 2004
2	26	2005	2005

== Episodes ==
=== Season 1 (2004) ===
No. overall	No. in season	Title	Directed by	Written by	U.S. air date
1	1	"Fashion Passion"	Becky Bristow	Andrew Brenner	June 23, 2004
1	1	"Small Wonder"	Becky Bristow	Andrew Brenner	June 23, 2004
Wayne is declared a fashion original when he attends his class photo in unusual clothes. Tony complains when he has to wear shiny doll shoes and convinces himself that he is shrinking, so Wayne intervenes.
2	2	"Date Dupe"	Becky Bristow	Ben Joseph Richard Liebmann-Smith	June 24, 2004
2	2	"Agent X"	Becky Bristow	Ben Joseph Richard Liebmann-Smith	June 24, 2004
Lucien feels nervous when Patsy McCloud invites him over to her house. When an enthusiastic kiss from Wendy leaves an indelible mark on Wayne's neck, Dorothy is confronted with a cleaning challenge that even she can't conquer.
3	3	"Mr. Winkle's Monkey"	Becky Bristow	Andrew Brenner Ken Koonce and Gene Braunstein	June 17, 2004
3	3	"Wicked Wendy"	Becky Bristow	Andrew Brenner Ken Koonce and Gene Braunstein	June 17, 2004
On their annual class trip to the Haz Chem Soap Factory, Lucien and Mari discover a mangy monkey on the premises. A silent clown shows up at the Cramps' front door, advertising the opening of a new indoor trampoline park, which Wendy decides to buy.
4	4	"Swamp Fever"	Becky Bristow	Randolph Heard Dennis Haley and Marcey Brown	June 25, 2004
4	4	"Kung Foolish"	Becky Bristow	Randolph Heard Dennis Haley and Marcey Brown	June 25, 2004
Lucien and Mari try to stop Mr. Winkle from building an amusement park on the swamp. Lucien takes up martial arts to protect himself from Wayne.
5	5	"Silence Please"	Becky Bristow	Richard Liebmann-Smith Dan Greenberger and Marcello Picone	June 28, 2004
5	5	"Fur Fungus"	Becky Bristow	Richard Liebmann-Smith Dan Greenberger and Marcello Picone	June 28, 2004
6	6	"Home on the Range"	Becky Bristow	Richard Liebmann-Smith Andrew Brenner	June 29, 2004
6	6	"Holesome"	Becky Bristow	Richard Liebmann-Smith Andrew Brenner	June 29, 2004
7	7	"Sick Daze"	Becky Bristow	Sean Veder Brian Wood	June 30, 2004
7	7	"Picket, Picket"	Becky Bristow	Sean Veder Brian Wood	June 30, 2004
8	8	"Nostalgia Nasty"	Becky Bristow	Ben Joseph Sean Veder	July 1, 2004
8	8	"Haircut Horrors"	Becky Bristow	Ben Joseph Sean Veder	July 1, 2004
When Wayne discovers an old-fashioned cast-iron laundry mangle, it sends Horace and Dorothy into a full-blown nostalgia mania. Dorothy decides that the twins need an urgent haircut, but finds out that the barber is too dirty to cut the boys' hair.
9	9	"Big Baby"	Becky Bristow	Randolph Heard Ken Koonce and Gene Braunstein	July 2, 2004
9	9	"Ad Bad"	Becky Bristow	Randolph Heard Ken Koonce and Gene Braunstein	July 2, 2004
10	10	"Workout"	Becky Bristow	Andrew Brenner	July 5, 2004
10	10	"6th Senselessness"	Becky Bristow	Andrew Brenner	July 5, 2004
11	11	"Twin Studies"	Becky Bristow	Andrew Brenner Sean Veder	July 6, 2004
11	11	"Birthday Blues"	Becky Bristow	Andrew Brenner Sean Veder	July 6, 2004
Wayne and Lucien come under the studious eye of twin psychologist Miss Monkfish, who intends to prove that all twins are alike, identical or not. When Wendy invites everyone in Soap City to her birthday party, Horace and Dorothy set out to make a big impression.
12	12	"Grandma's Piano"	Becky Bristow	Ben Joseph Richard Liebmann-Smith	July 7, 2004
12	12	"Guide Games"	Becky Bristow	Ben Joseph Richard Liebmann-Smith	July 7, 2004
Dorothy's mother pays a visit. Some tourists ask the twins for a tour during a Soap Day.
13	13	"Prize Swallow"	Becky Bristow	Sean Veder Brian Wood	July 8, 2004
13	13	"Ice Scream"	Becky Bristow	Sean Veder Brian Wood	July 8, 2004
Wayne gets back at Lucien by blowing an obnoxious bird call flute and attracts the crested marsh swallow and a flock of a rare species of swallows with a whistle onto the roof of the Cramp house. Now Lucien and Tony have to get them away before Mr. Winkle buys them. Tired of Wayne's antics, Tony makes up a horror story about a toothless criminal using daikon-like radishes.
14	14	"Wolfman Wayne"	Becky Bristow	Andrew Brenner	June 15, 2004
14	14	"Shed Dead"	Becky Bristow	Andrew Brenner	June 15, 2004
15	15	"Spy's Pies"	Becky Bristow	David Polsky Dennis Haley and Marcey Brown	July 9, 2004
15	15	"No Means Yes"	Becky Bristow	David Polsky Dennis Haley and Marcey Brown	July 9, 2004
A new neighbor is determined to find out Dorothy's secret for cleaning. Lucien reluctantly agrees to come to Mari's house before Parents' Night.
16	16	"Chameleon Chaos"	Becky Bristow	Sean Veder Andrew Brenner	July 13, 2004
16	16	"Weedkiller"	Becky Bristow	Sean Veder Andrew Brenner	July 13, 2004
Wayne feels scared when Lucien brings home a lizard from the swamp. Lucien tries to take care of a little swamp plant growing from a crack in the pavement.
17	17	"Room Rage"	Becky Bristow Tamara Varga	Andrew Brenner Brian Wood	July 12, 2004
17	17	"Dirty Monkey"	Becky Bristow Tamara Varga	Andrew Brenner Brian Wood	July 12, 2004
Dorothy demands that every room in the house is kept clean. Dorothy wins a competition for a free beauty makeover for the whole family.
18	18	"Hotel Hysteria"	Becky Bristow Tamara Varga	Sean Veder Andrew Brenner	June 21, 2004
18	18	"Alien Glow"	Becky Bristow Tamara Varga	Sean Veder Andrew Brenner	June 21, 2004
19	19	"Miss Kissy"	Becky Bristow	Andrew Brenner	June 16, 2004
19	19	"Friend Fight"	Becky Bristow	Andrew Brenner	June 16, 2004
Wayne gets in trouble when he tries to tell the school about Miss Hissy's new boyfriend. Lucien laughs at Tony for believing in the Newt Man and the two fall out as friends.
20	20	"Walk Like a Man"	Tamara Varga Becky Bristow	Mark Billingham and Peter Cocks Brian Wood	June 18, 2004
20	20	"Bouncy Bob"	Tamara Varga Becky Bristow	Mark Billingham and Peter Cocks Brian Wood	June 18, 2004
Tired of Wayne's immaturity, Lucien tricks him into thinking he's grown facial hair. Lucien and Horace are the odd ones out when a pogo stick-like toy become the talk of the town.
21	21	"The Great Luciani"	Becky Bristow -	Story by : Richard Liebmann-Smith; Written by : Sean Veder Brian Wood	July 14, 2004
21	21	"Wendy Boy"	Becky Bristow -	Story by : Richard Liebmann-Smith; Written by : Sean Veder Brian Wood	July 14, 2004
When Lucien outdoes him with a magic kit, Wayne fakes a disappearing act. Now everyone's convinced Wayne can do real magic. Wendy tries to act like a tomboy to impress her father.
22	22	"Food Fight"	Becky Bristow	David Polsky Brian Wood	July 15, 2004
22	22	"Mari Mania"	Becky Bristow	David Polsky Brian Wood	July 15, 2004
After switching cereals, Lucien becomes a popular environmentalist and Wayne becomes lazy. Mari can't stand having a bad picture with her foster family. Meanwhile, chaos is happening in the town.
23	23	"Great Bowl of Fear"	Becky Bristow	Peter Cocks and Mark Billingham Andrew Brenner	June 14, 2004
23	23	"Mud Crush"	Becky Bristow	Peter Cocks and Mark Billingham Andrew Brenner	June 14, 2004
Lucien needs to go to the bathroom but Wayne is fishing in it. Dorothy starts using medicinal swamp mud from Lucien.
24	24	"Petrified Poodles"	Tamara Varga Becky Bristow	Andrew Brenner Nicola Kent	July 16, 2004
24	24	"Harp Wars"	Tamara Varga Becky Bristow	Andrew Brenner Nicola Kent	July 16, 2004
Wendy asks Wayne to look after their dogs when the Winkles go on holiday. When Wendy becomes frustrated with trying to play any of her many musical instruments, she dumps them on the school as the Wendy Winkle Endowment for the Arts.
25	25	"The Bad Seed"	Becky Bristow	Peter Cocks and Mark Billingham Andrew Brenner	July 19, 2004
25	25	"Rodeo Rita"	Becky Bristow	Peter Cocks and Mark Billingham Andrew Brenner	July 19, 2004
Wayne starts acting like a historical troublemaker. Horace forces the boys to celebrate Cowboy Week in celebration of his favorite country singer. However, the twins learn she may not be what she seems to be.
26	26	"Worm Funeral"	Becky Bristow	Peter Cocks and Mark Billingham Andrew Brenner and Nicola Kent	June 22, 2004
26	26	"One Sock Wonder"	Becky Bristow	Peter Cocks and Mark Billingham Andrew Brenner and Nicola Kent	June 22, 2004

=== Season 2 (2005) ===
No. overall	No. in season	Title	Directed by	Written by	Original release date
27	1	"Weepy Wayne / First Crusher"	Frank Gresham (supervising)	Andrew Brenner Daniel Lennard	TBA
28	2	"Pantaloonacy / Girl Gang"	Frank Gresham (supervising)	Ian Carney Andrew Brenner	TBA
29	3	"Triker Trouble / Heart Wrench"	Frank Gresham	Andrew Brenner Sean Veder	TBA
30	4	"Count Crampula / Naughty Nuptials"	Frank Gresham	Peter Cocks Brian Wood	TBA
31	5	"Little Watchers / Egg Bound"	Frank Gresham	Bob Mittenthal Ian Carney	TBA
32	6	"Little Big Man / Flag Boy"	Frank Gresham	Ian Carney Andrew Brenner	TBA
33	7	"Hankenstein / Cricket Slayer"	Frank Gresham	Brian Wood Bob Mittenthal	TBA
34	8	"Bully for Wayne / Agent W"	Frank Gresham	Sean Veder Andrew Brenner	TBA
35	9	"Wendy House / Cramp vs. Cramp"	Frank Gresham	Brian Wood Ian Carney	TBA
36	10	"Webcam Wayne / Swamp Curse"	Frank Gresham	Brian Wood Ian Carney	TBA
37	11	"Lice-ence to Kill / Army of Wayne"	Frank Gresham	Peter Cocks Ian Carney	TBA
38	12	"Swampless / Mummy Mania"	Frank Gresham	Brian Wood	TBA
A disagreement between Lucien and Tony involving cereals that Wayne has been collecting leads the former to create his own Swamp at his house. After not trusting the boys and Horace to look after themselves, Dorothy appoints Miss Hissy as housesitter while she goes on a trip.
39	13	"Wendy Wear / Homeless Joe"	Frank Gresham	Andrew Brenner	TBA
40	14	"Dance Pants / Bestest Brother"	Frank Gresham	Brian Wood Peter Cocks	TBA
41	15	"Film Fad / Spit Collector"	Frank Gresham	Andrew Brenner Peter Cocks	TBA
42	16	"News Whale / Twisted Ending"	Frank Gresham	Andrew Brenner Sean Veder	TBA
43	17	"Tattoo Boy / Cow Son"	Frank Gresham	Peter Cocks Andrew Brenner	TBA
44	18	"Goosenapped / Rotten Romance"	Frank Gresham	Andrew Brenner Nicola Kent	TBA
45	19	"Sugar Zombie / Beware the Rare Colossal Swamp Squid"	Frank Gresham	Andrew Brenner Ian Carney	TBA
46	20	"Keith / Mommy Boy"	Frank Gresham	Daniel Lennard Andrew Brenner	TBA
47	21	"Lion Worrier / Grandma Dearest"	Frank Gresham	Andrew Brenner Ian Carney	TBA
48	22	"Mister Congeniality / Get Greedy"	Frank Gresham	Sean Veder Bob Mittenthal	TBA
49	23	"Slave Mart / Cool for Cramp"	Frank Gresham	Andrew Brenner	TBA
50	24	"Just Desserts / Pirate Pants"	Frank Gresham	Sean Veder Brian Wood	TBA
51	25	"Neigh Means Neigh / Miner Mishaps"	Frank Gresham	Randolph Heard Andrew Brenner	TBA
52	26	"Happy Gas / Twin Toys"	Frank Gresham	Brian Wood	2005
