= List of Crush Gear Turbo episodes =

The following is the list of episodes of Crush Gear Turbo, where the airdate shown is the date of the episode aired in Japan for the first time.

#	Episode Title	Japanese Title	Episode title (English dub)	Original airdate
1	Moero! Giafaito Damashii	燃えろ！ギアファイト魂	The Burning Spirit of Gear Fighting	October 7, 2001
2	Anpan Faitā o Sagase!	あんぱんファイターを探せ！	Find the Red Bean Bun Fighter	October 14, 2001
3	Tensai Giamasutā Jin!	天才ギアマスター ジン!	Gear Master Kyousuke Jin	October 21, 2001
4	Yonninme no Faitā	4人目のファイター	The Fourth Fighter	October 28, 2001
5	Tobitakurabu no Kiki	トビタクラブの危機	Trouble in the Tobita Club	November 4, 2001
6	Gia o Kaketa Faito	ギアをかけたファイト	Betting with Our Gear	November 11, 2001
7	Anikara no Okurimono	兄からの贈り物	A Gift from My Brother	November 18, 2001
8	Takoyaki Batoruroiyaru!	タコ焼きバトルロイヤル！	Octopus Barbeque Battle Royale	November 25, 2001
9	Jirou no Furukizu	ジロウの古傷	Jirou's Old Wounds	December 2, 2001
10	Tensai wa Tensai o Yobu!	天才は天才を呼ぶ！	The Real Gear Genius	December 9, 2001
11	Shōri e no Shūnen	勝利への執念	Victory Through Stubbornness	December 16, 2001
12	Shijō Saikyō no Gia Gaiki	史上最強のギア 鎧輝	The Strongest Gear in The World	December 23, 2001
13	Yūjō to Raibaru	友情とライバル	Friendship and Rivalry	December 30, 2001
14	Manganji no Yabō	マンガンジの野望	Takeshi's Dream Team	January 6, 2002
15	Kita no Kuni no Kendo Takekura!	北の国の剣豪 武蔵!	The Swordmaster of Hokkaido - Takekura	January 13, 2002
16	Sorezore no Tatakai!	それぞれの闘い！	Struggle of Everybody	January 20, 2002
17	Kyōfu no Illusion Cup!	恐怖のイリュージョン カップ！	Horror Illusion Cup	January 27, 2002
18	Garudaīguru ni Fuku Kaze	ガルダイーグルに吹く風	Garuda Eagle's Roots	February 3, 2002
19	Takoyaking no Gyakushū!	タコヤキングの逆襲！	Return of the Burning Octopus	February 10, 2002
20	Tobe! Garudaīguru!!	翔べ！ガルダイーグル！！	Fly Garuda Eagle	February 17, 2002
21	Tobitakurabu Dai Shingeki!	トビタクラブ大進撃！	Attack of the Tobita Club	February 24, 2002
22	Kanashimi no Shōri	哀しみの勝利	A Sad Victory	March 3, 2002
23	Sono Itten o Nerae!	その一点をねらえ！	Hit the Right Spot	March 10, 2002
24	Kuinaki Ittō!	悔いなき一投！	No Regrets	March 17, 2002
25	Tomo yo, Gekitō no Hate ni!	友よ、激闘の果てに！	The Choice of Friendship	March 24, 2002
26	Tanjō! Garudafenikkusu!	誕生！ガルダフェニックス！	Garuda Phoenix	March 31, 2002
27	Kouya tai Haipā Jii-chan!	コウヤ対ハイパージィちゃん！	Kouya versus the Hyper Grandpa	April 7, 2002
28	Aratanaru Raibaru Wang Hu!	新たなるライバル 王虎！	My New Rival, Wang Hu	April 14, 2002
29	Kaimaku! Ajiakappu	開幕！アジアカップ	Asian Cup Opening Match	April 21, 2002
30	Unare! Bītorudash!!	唸れ！ビートルダッシュ！！	Bravo Beetle Dash	April 28, 2002
31	Burakkugaruda no Nazo	ブラックガルダの謎	The Black Phoenix Mystery	May 5, 2002
32	Toki o Kakeru Kizuna	時をかける絆	Past Memories	May 12, 2002
33	Gekitotsu! Garudafenikussu tai Taigareido	激突！鳳凰（ガルダフェニックス） 対 猛虎（タイガレイド）	Collision! The Phoenix versus the Tiger	May 19, 2002
34	Kyūkyoku no Faitā! Manganji Sangaishō!	究極のファイター！万願寺三凱将！	The Manganji Nightmare	May 26, 2002
35	Shukumei no Taiketsu! Ajiakappu Saishū Kessen!	宿命の対決！アジアカップ最終決戦！	Asia Cup Final - The Fated Match	June 2, 2002
36	Asia Cup TODAY Special!	アジアカップTODAYスペシャル！	The Asia Cup Today Special	June 9, 2002
37	Ninja Faitā Kenzan!	忍者ファイター見参！	The Ninja Gear Fighter	June 23, 2002
38	Garudaīguru o Tsukutta Otoko	ガルダイーグルを作った男	The One Who Built Garuda Eagle	June 30, 2002
39	Barutokai no Arawashi Gallen!	バルト海の荒鷲 ガレン！	A Battle for Friendship	July 7, 2002
40	Kettō! Kurasshu Ganryūjima	決闘！クラッシュ巌流島	The Gan Ryuu Jima Battle	July 14, 2002
41	Wārudokappu Aratanaru Tatakai!	ワールドカップ 新たなる戦い！	World Cup Championship	July 21, 2002
42	Kareinaru Weiss Ritters	華麗なる白い騎士団	The Flamboyant White Knights	July 28, 2002
43	Kizuna ni Musubareta Faito!	絆に結ばれたファイト！	A Strong Bond	August 4, 2002
44	Hatsudō! Kyōfu no Huchaobingji!	発動！恐怖の虎超氷撃！	The Terrible Attack Begins!	August 11, 2002
45	Uketsuga Rerumono	受け継がれるもの	Bearing the Strain	August 18, 2002
46	U-YA no Himitsu	U－YAの秘密	U-YA's Secret	August 25, 2002
47	Taigafurea no Namida	タイガフレアの涙	The Tears of Tiger Flare	September 1, 2002
48	Arawashi Gurifīdo, Futatabi!	荒鷲グリフィード、再び！	Grifeed, the Tercel	September 8, 2002
49	Nikushimi no Kuroki Fenikkusu	憎しみの黒き不死鳥	The Black Phoenix	September 15, 2002
50	Hakai Kikōshi Cain	破壊貴公子 ケイン	The Prince of Darkness, Cain	September 22, 2002
51	Shippū no Ākukyabariā!	疾風のアークキャバリアー！	The Typhoon, Ark Cavalier	September 29, 2002
52	Kokoro o Tsunagu Faito	心を繋ぐファイト	The Heart Connection	October 6, 2002
53	Himerareta Chikara	秘められた力	Secret Power	October 13, 2002
54	Ninja Faitā o Uchiyabure!	忍者ファイターを撃ち破れ！	Getting Even with the Ninja	October 20, 2002
55	Hokoriaru Giafaito	誇りあるギアファイト	Fight with Pride	October 27, 2002
56	Taiketsu! Kuroudo tai Kyousuke	対決！クロウド対キョウスケ	Kuroudo versus Kyousuke - The Final Showdown	November 3, 2002
57	Yūjō no Ringu	友情のリング	The Ring of Friendship	November 10, 2002
58	Shōri o Tsukamu Mono	勝利を掴む者	The One with the Victory in Hand	November 17, 2002
59	Kojō no Taiketsu! Jirou tai U-YA!	古城の対決！ジロウ対U－YA！	Jirou vs. U-YA! The Castle Battle	November 24, 2002
60	Yakusoku no Faito	約束のファイト	The Promised Fight	December 1, 2002
61	Tomo ni Todoke! Gia no Kokoro	友に届け！ギアの心	My Friend, Hear the Heartbeat of My Gear	December 8, 2002
62	Kuroimori no Giamasutā	黒い森のギアマスター	Is He the Legendary Gear God?	December 15, 2002
63	Garuda no Na no Moto ni	ガルダの名の下に	The Real Garuda	December 22, 2002
64	Tamashī no Giafaito	魂のギアファイト	The Gear Fight Between the Soul	December 29, 2002
65	Eien no Raibaru	永遠の好敵手	My Rival Forever	January 5, 2003
66	Unmei no Rasuto Faito	運命のラストファイト	The Last Fight	January 12, 2003
67	Ringu o Kakeru Kaze	リングを翔ける疾風	The Wind Sweeping Up in the Ring	January 19, 2003
68	Kagayake! Atsuki Gia Tamashī!	輝け！熱きギア魂！	Shine! The Soul of the Gear!	January 26, 2003
