= List of A Little Snow Fairy Sugar episodes =

The episodes of the anime series A Little Snow Fairy Sugar were created by "Project Sugar"—a collaboration between TBS, J.C.Staff, and Kadokawa Shoten—and directed by Shinichiro Kimura. The first episode premiered in Japan on TBS on October 2, 2001, and the series ran for 24 episodes until its conclusion on March 26, 2002. A two episode original video animation was released for the series. Set four years after the conclusion of the series, Saga tells Kanon about a school play in which she played the princess and struggled with stage fright, while Sugar and other fairies decide to make a play of their own.

The anime series uses three pieces of theme music. "Sugar Baby Love" by Yoko Ishida is used for the opening theme for all of the episodes except the first and the last, which use no opening. It is also used for the ending theme for the last episode. Maria Yamamoto's performance of the song "Snow Flower" is used for the ending theme for the first 23 episodes.

== Episode listing ==
=== A Little Snow Fairy Sugar ===
No.	Title	Original release date
1	"Saga Meets Sugar"; Transliteration: "Saga, Shugā to Deau" (Japanese: サガ、シュガーと出会う)	October 2, 2001
It is another normal day in Saga's life, until she meets a tiny figure and feeds it a waffle. Complicating the budding relationship is that this little thing introduces itself as Sugar, a snow fairy — and Saga does not believe in fairies.
2	"An Itsy-Bitsy Roommate"; Transliteration: "Chitchana Rūmumeito" (Japanese: ちっちゃなルームメイト)	October 9, 2001
Sugar, determined to learn more about the human world, accompanies Saga to her school. But her naivety about human life and Saga's open scolding bring Saga a lot of trouble. To add to the confusion, two more fairies appear: Salt; a sun fairy and Pepper; a wind fairy .
3	"Twinkle-Twinkle, Comfy-Warm, Puffy-Fluffy"; Transliteration: "Kirakira, Pokapoka, Fuwafuwa" (Japanese: きらきら、ぽかぽか、ふわふわ)	October 16, 2001
During market day, Sugar, Salt and Pepper set off to find themselves a "twinkle" - but neither of them have any concrete idea about what a "twinkle" really is! Sugar thinks that it should be twinkling, Salt thinks that it should be comfy-warm, but Pepper thinks that it should be puffy-fluffy. A crow eager for shiny trinkets becomes an additional hazard in their quest.
4	"Where Are the "Twinkles"?"; Transliteration: ""Kirameki" wa Doko?" (Japanese: きらめきはどこ?)	October 23, 2001
Following a hint from Pepper's dove friends, the three little fairies turn Saga's school upside-down in their search for the "twinkle".
5	"The Elder Arrives!!"; Transliteration: "Chōrō-sama Arawaru!!" (Japanese: 長老さま現る!!)	October 30, 2001
The Elder arrives in the human world, ostensibly to watch the apprentice fairies progress, but in reality he has a much more "serious" goal in mind: winning beautiful rain fairy Ginger's heart! However, his own shyness and the pestering of the little fairies about telling him what a "twinkle" really is don't make the job easier for either him or Ginger.
6	"I Couldn't Say Sorry"; Transliteration: "Gomen ne ga Ienakute" (Japanese: ゴメンねがいえなくて)	November 6, 2001
Sugar bungles again, and in a tensed-up effort to do better. She only succeeds in annoying Saga, and the two have a serious row. However, an attempt by Sugar to amend the situation results in her unintentionally defacing one of Saga's most cherished mementos of her late mother.
7	"Heart Joining Melody"; Transliteration: "Kokoro o Tsunagu Merodī" (Japanese: 心をつなぐメロディー)	November 13, 2001
Sugar and Saga have broken up. While they do miss each other, stubbornness on both sides prevents them from approaching each other and making up. Sugar takes up with two irresponsible fairy apprentices, Cinnamon; an ice fairy, and Basil; a lightning fairy — but is the wild, carefree life really something for her?
8	"The Shape of Dreams"; Transliteration: "Yume no Katachi" (Japanese: 夢のカタチ)	November 20, 2001
Phil, the never-tired inventor, tries his hands at an ambitious project: to artificially create an aurora. This project of course meets disbelief and criticism from both his fellow students and fairies alike. Salt, his most vocal critic at first, funnily ends up assisting Phil in his efforts.
9	"The Bear Pianist"; Transliteration: "Kuma no Pianisuto" (Japanese: クマのピアニスト)	November 27, 2001
The Hammond Theater group comes to Mühlenburg with the story of the Bear Pianist, a heart-touching play. At the same time, a young actor of the troupe named Vincent greatly troubles Saga with a careless remark.
10	"A Backstage Happening"; Transliteration: "Bakkusutēji Hapuningu" (Japanese: バックステージハプニング)	December 4, 2001
Sugar, Salt and Pepper go on an adventure backstage to find out what a play really is, but almost end up making it a disaster.
11	"My Favorite Piano"; Transliteration: "Atashi no Suki na Piano" (Japanese: あたしの好きなピアノ)	December 11, 2001
Unnerved by Vincent's behavior, Saga and Sugar don't know what to make of him: While Saga finds his way of playing the piano a disgrace to all 'decent' musicians, Sugar and her friends try to find out whether he can really see them ... or can he?
12	"Goodbye, Mr. Bear"; Transliteration: "Sayonara, Kuma-san" (Japanese: さよなら、クマさん)	December 18, 2001
Just before their last performance, Vincent sprains his hand and is unable to play the piano, which is a vital part of the Bear Pianist's story. Much to everyone's surprise, Vincent recommends Saga to fill in for him at the piano seat. As Saga fights with her stage fright, it is Sugar who provides her with much-needed moral support; and as they return home, a tremendous surprise awaits them...
13	"A "Twinkle" Found?!"; Transliteration: ""Kirameki" Mitsuketa!?" (Japanese: きらめきみつけた!?)	January 8, 2002
Sugar's magical flower has sprouted a bud; but that is strange, since they have not found a "twinkle" - or have they? A small trip to the countryside is meant to help in the finding of the "twinkle", but instead a few other experiences are gained.
14	"Pepper and the Dream of Mr. Turtle"; Transliteration: "Peppā to Kame-san no Yume" (Japanese: ペッパーとカメさんの夢)	January 15, 2002
In the veterinary clinic where she lives, Pepper meets the turtle Lancelot, whose greatest dream is to learn how to fly. By nature's decree turtles are not meant to fly, but still Pepper tries her best to make the impossible come true.
15	"The Tiny Guest"; Transliteration: "Chitchana Okyaku-sama" (Japanese: ちっちゃなお客さま)	January 22, 2002
Grandmother Regina invites a very young girl named Kanon in her house for a few days. Soon, the lively child taxes Saga and Sugar to no end.
16	"The Faraway Town's First Snow"; Transliteration: "Tōi Machi no Hatsuyuki" (Japanese: 遠いまちの初雪)	January 29, 2002
The season fairies are departing for a field trip in order to gain more practical experience. In a town where the first snow is late, Sugar gains the chance to live up to her mother's image.
17	"While Waiting For Sugar"; Transliteration: "Shugā o Machinagara" (Japanese: シュガーを待ちながら)	February 5, 2002
Saga is waiting for Sugar's return, but when she learns that the season fairies have to cross an area hit by a typhoon, she becomes sick with worry about her little friend.
18	"Festival! Waffo!"; Transliteration: "Omatsuri, Waffo!" (Japanese: おまつり、ワッホー!)	February 12, 2002
The Mühlenburgers celebrate a traditional festival, and Saga and Sugar live through a marvelous day.
19	"One Memory For Two"; Transliteration: "Futari Dake Omoide" (Japanese: ふたりだけの思い出)	February 19, 2002
Sugar's Magic Flower is about to bloom! After the Mühlenburg festival, Saga and Sugar help clean up the town, but the task soon becomes a memory tour.
20	"The Vanished Promise"; Transliteration: "Kiechatta Yakusoku" (Japanese: 消えちゃった約束)	February 26, 2002
Saga and Sugar are just about to go play Saga's mom's song on her mother's piano when she discovers that her piano was sold. Who knew it would end up in such an unexpected place...
21	"The Lonely Two"; Transliteration: "Hitoribotchi no Futari" (Japanese: ひとりぼっちのふたり)	March 5, 2002
After the discovery of the whereabouts of her mother's piano, Saga feverishly decides to work overtime to buy back the piano, making everyone worry about her.
22	"I'm Sorry, Sugar"; Transliteration: "Gomen ne, Shugā" (Japanese: ゴメンね、シュガー)	March 12, 2002
While Sugar struggles with Saga and the piano, Salt and Pepper finally find their "Twinkles". Sugar congratulates them with a big smile ... but is she really happy?
23	"Tiny Miracle at Muhlenburg"; Transliteration: "Myūrenburuku no Chiisana Kiseki" (Japanese: ミューレンブルクの小さな奇跡)	March 19, 2002
Greta and the others decide to deliver back Saga's piano, but their plan goes haywire when Luchino accidentally pushes it down a hill.
24	"I'm Right Over Here"; Transliteration: "Atashi wa Koko ni Iru yo" (Japanese: あたしはここにいるよ)	March 26, 2002
The last episode of the series leads to a heart-wrenching farewell: Sugar and Saga must part with each other as Sugar finally understands what a "twinkle" is about and succeeds in making her magic flower bloom.

=== A Little Snow Fairy Sugar Special ===
No.	Title	Original release date
1	"What's in Your Heart (Part 1)"; Transliteration: "Sono Mune ni Aru Mono Zenpen" (Japanese: その胸にあるもの 前編)	August 21, 2003
Four years after the events of the regular series, Grandma Regina finds an old dress of Saga's in the attic, and together they recall how Saga wore it when she played the role of a princess in a school play. But Saga also remembers how Sugar and her friends wanted to be part of the play ...
2	"What's in Your Heart (Part 2)"; Transliteration: "Sono Mune ni Aru Mono Kōhen" (Japanese: その胸にあるもの 後編)	August 28, 2003
Saga's recollections continue: While the class struggled with the inevitable mishaps that arose as they prepared for the play, Sugar and her friends put on a play of their own. Meanwhile, an old friend who wouldn't miss the play for anything made his way to town just in time to see the students come together for a truly memorable performance. The end of the episode shows us a glimpse of Saga's life now that it's four years later.
