= Behind the Music that Sucks =

Series of comics

Behind the Music that Sucks is a series of comic pieces produced by, and appearing on, the entertainment website Heavy.com. The segments feature humorous jabs at pop stars and celebrities. The shorts run approximately three minutes each and employ cutout animation based largely on celebrity photographs and stock images. In addition to the Internet, the series has been broadcast on television in Canada, Japan, Israel, Sweden, the United Kingdom, and the United States.

== Production and broadcast ==
Conceived as a parody of VH1's popular biography show Behind the Music, Behind the Music that Sucks was created by Dave Carson, a composer, and Simon Assaad, a filmmaker, in 1998. The series consists of segments featuring humorous jabs at pop stars and celebrities. Each segment runs approximately three minutes each and employs cutout animation based largely on celebrity photographs and stock images. After the series became popular on the Internet, Carson and Assaad founded Heavy.com in 1999, where Behind the Music that Sucks became the flagship series. In 2005, production resumed after a three-year hiatus. The program has been broadcast on television in Japan, Israel, the United Kingdom, the United States, Canada, and Sweden. In spite of a period of inactivity, the original run of Behind the Music that Sucks never left syndication, remaining available on Heavy.com and Comcast digital cable's on demand service. Behind the Music that Sucks, having managed to outlive the show it was based on, continues to be one of the site's most well-known properties.

== Episodes ==
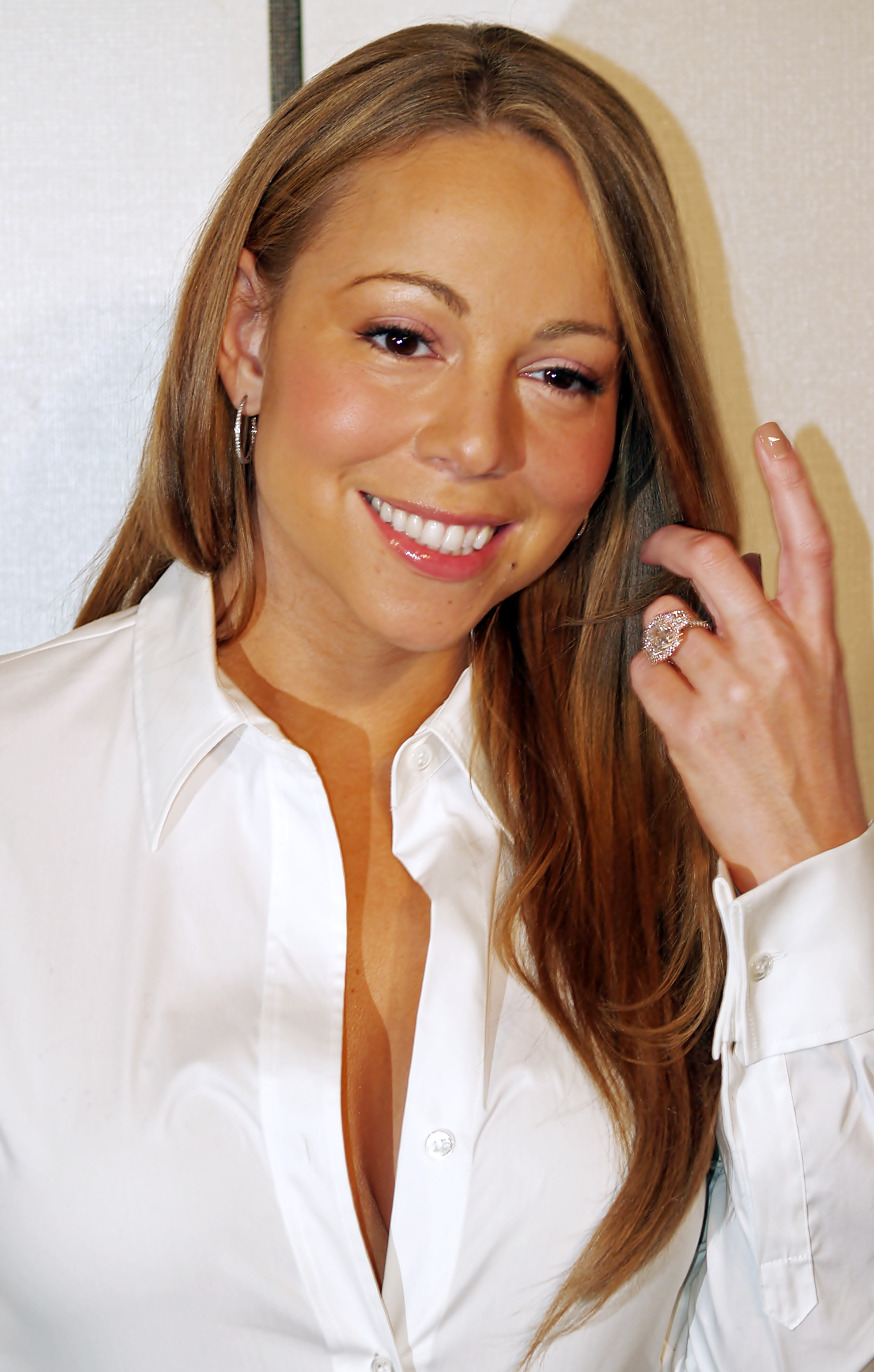
Mariah Carey

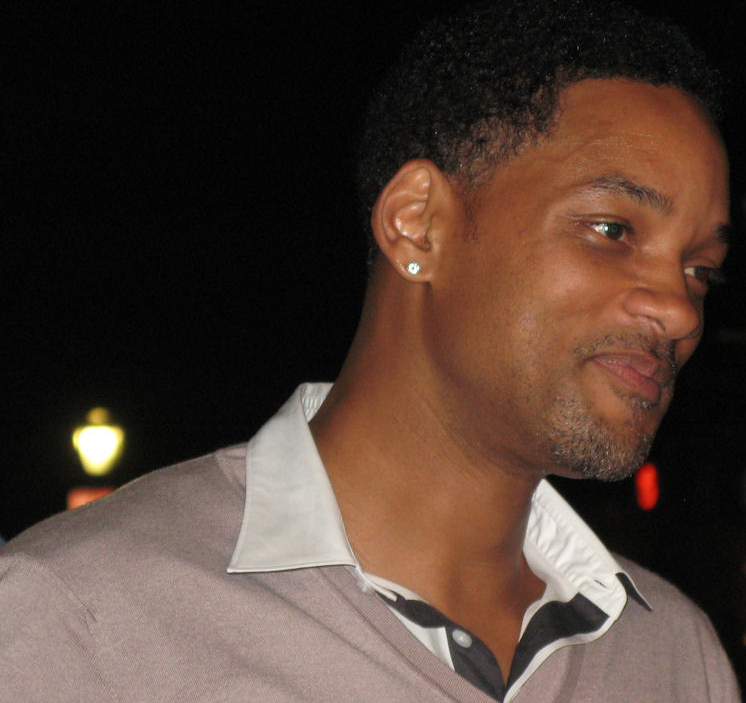
Will Smith

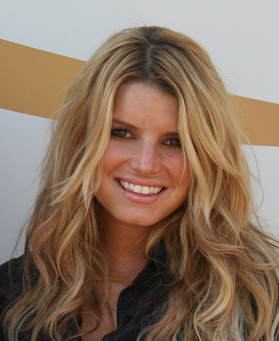
Jessica Simpson

The following is a list of acts, many of whom were also featured on the original VH1 program, that have been lampooned during the series' run. Occasionally, non-musical entities have been sent up by the series as well, such as the iPod, MySpace, The OC and the first child of Britney Spears and Kevin Federline.

From 1998–2002:

- AC/DC
- All American Rejects
- Backstreet Boys
- The Bacon Brothers
- Baha Men
- Barbra Streisand
- Billy Joel
- Bloodhound Gang
- Bon Jovi
- Britney Spears
- Celine Dion
- Cher
- Christina Aguilera
- Chumbawamba
- Courtney Love
- Creed
- Dave Matthews Band
- David Hasselhoff
- Dixie Chicks
- Dr. Dre
- Eminem
- Eric Clapton
- Extreme
- Fiona Apple
- Garbage
- Garth Brooks
- Glenn Miller
- The Go-Go's
- Guns N' Roses
- Hanson
- Hootie and the Blowfish
- Iggy Pop
- Insane Clown Posse
- Jennifer Lopez
- Jewel
- Joe C.
- John Denver
- Kenny Loggins
- Kid Rock
- KISS
- Limp Bizkit
- Linkin Park
- Lionel Richie
- LL Cool J
- Mariah Carey
- Marilyn Manson
- Master P
- Melissa Etheridge
- Metallica
- Mötley Crüe
- 'N Sync
- Nine Inch Nails
- Oasis
- The Offspring
- Ol' Dirty Bastard
- O-Town
- Phish
- Puff Daddy
- Rush
- Shania Twain
- Sisqó
- Smashing Pumpkins
- Sting
- Stryper
- Ted Nugent
- Tina Turner
- Tom Jones
- Tupac Shakur
- Van Halen
- Whitney Houston
- Will Smith
- William Shatner

From 2005–present:

- Three 6 Mafia
- 50 Cent
- Avril Lavigne
- The Black Eyed Peas
- Green Day
- Gwen Stefani
- Hilary Duff
- Jessica Simpson
- Justin Bieber
- Kanye West
- Katharine McPhee
- Lil' Kim
- Lindsay Lohan
- Moby
- Owl City
- Paula Abdul
- Paris Hilton
- R. Kelly
- The Strokes
- Taylor Hicks
- U2
- Yanni

== Reception ==
Britney Spears and the Bloodhound Gang have reportedly seen their segments on Behind the Music that Sucks and "loved" them. Entertainment Weekly's Ann Limpert wrote in her review of the series: "You'll quickly find your way to these rude animated spoofs of VH1's Behind the Music that chronicle the lives of such easy targets as Streisand, Puff Daddy, and Jewel. The site does away with the soft lighting of the real BTM to showcase some truly squirm-inducing images (a self-pleasuring Marilyn Manson, the Pope looking at Britney Spears centerfolds). The real fun lies in watching the virtual artists say what's been behind their faces all along." Roger Gathman of The Austin Chronicle said: "Sometimes the humor is inspired, as when a young but very budding Mariah Carey tries out for a Christian cartoon network. Sometimes the joke is that females have big breasts. Cartoon jiggling is big on Behind the Music That Sucks." Mike Durrett of About.com wrote: "Not satisfied to churn out simple pastiches of political incorrectness, the creative team shrieks with an exhilarating display of mean-spirited vulgarity, profanity, sacrilege and violence. Ironically, modern day music is regularly that, so comeuppance is served. It's only rock-and-roll, but I laugh at it."

Kate Stables of The Guardian called Behind the Music that Sucks a "wonderful pastiche" of Behind the Music, and highlighted the parodies of Barbra Streisand and Billy Joel. Marc Savlov of The Austin Chronicle said all segments of Behind the Music that Sucks "are more or less guaranteed to either a) make you laff [sic], or b) make you gag." In a review of a hip-hop DVD collection of the series, Paul Lingas of Audio Video Revolution wrote: "These spoofs capture all of the seriousness that makes Behind the Music such a popular program and twists it into something very amusing. Thankfully, each one of the segments is very short, preserving the novelty of the approach for each segment and sparing us when the segments simply aren't funny. In the end, this is a somewhat amusing collection of profane and obnoxious slams against hip-hop artists, though some are much better than others. Those who don't like these people will get a kick out of the spoof segments but little more, and as for fans of these artists, I think they might enjoy them just a little bit, too."

Marc Juris, president of MuchMusic, said about the series: "Musicians are a wonderfully creative bunch, with both the art they create and the oversized adventures and myths they generate as they travel the ladder of fame. This series pokes fun at their outrageous behavior and the television institution that makes a business of amplifying their climb, crash and burn, and ultimate redemption. For the stars, it's a chance to laugh at themselves; for the creators of Behind the Music it shows that imitation and exaggeration of their stock and trade is the most sincere form of flattery." A reviewer for The Gazette commented, "At least after a couple of glasses of wine, these spoofs of Paris Hilton, Creed and Ted Nugent seemed downright hilarious, even if the animation looks like it was drawn by a 5-year-old."
