= Blossom Jackson =

Fictional character from EastEnders

- EastEnders character
- Portrayed by: Mona Hammond
- Duration: 1994–1997, 2010
- First appearance: Episode 974; 16 May 1994
- Last appearance: Episode 4094; 26 October 2010
- Introduced by: Barbara Emile (1994); Bryan Kirkwood (2010)
In-universe information
- Husband: Nathan (backstory)
- Grandsons: Alan Jackson; Malcolm Jackson
- Other relatives: Billie Jackson; Kai Jackson

Blossom Jackson is a fictional character from the BBC soap opera EastEnders, played by Mona Hammond. The character originally appeared from 16 May 1994 to 29 May 1997. Hammond was installed as a matriarchal figure of the Jackson clan but quit the role in 1997, reportedly because she was suffering from nervous exhaustion. She reprised the role on 25 October 2010 for two episodes.

== Creation and development ==
Blossom was introduced in 1994 as the "no-nonsense" grandmother of Alan Jackson (Howard Antony). Author Kate Lock describes Blossom as a "robust Tobagonian". This was Mona Hammond's second role on the soap, as she had previously played the midwife of Michelle Fowler (Susan Tully) in 1986.

Hammond, who was in her late 60s at the time, opted to quit playing Blossom in 1997, reportedly because she was suffering from nervous exhaustion due to EastEnders's work schedule. An insider told the Daily Mirror, "Mona's been in almost every episode since she joined back in 1993. It's a phenomenal workload for someone of her age. She was getting so nervous on set that she finally put her foot down and insisted on a break. She said she couldn't cope any more and that it had taken its toll on her nerves. She refused to sign a three-month contract, saying it would finish her off." At the time, the actress was on a 3-month break, and although reports suggested Hammond agreed to return to the soap in the summer of 1997 for four weeks to allow Blossom to have an exit, she did not return.

Following producer Bryan Kirkwood's decision to kill off Blossom's great-grandson Billie Jackson (Devon Anderson), Hammond was asked to reprise the role of Blossom for a brief stint. Blossom appeared at his funeral in October 2010 and was featured in two episodes beginning from 25 October.

Following Hammond's death in 2022, EastEnders honoured the actress and character, writing, "We are deeply saddened to hear that Mona Hammond has passed away. Mona created a no nonsense grandmother in Blossom Jackson, who was adored by the audience and everyone who worked with her. Our love and thoughts are with Mona’s family and friends".

== Storylines ==
=== 1994–1997 ===
Blossom is the grandmother of Alan Jackson (Howard Antony). Originally from Tobago, she came to Britain as a young child and grew up in east London. Her first marriage to Nathan ended after he deserted her, and she spent the latter part of her life living with her common-law husband, Bill, until he died in 1993.

On screen, she comes to live with Alan and his common-law wife Carol (Lindsey Coulson) at number 25 Albert Square in 1994 after her flat in Wapping is burgled. Blossom is great-grandmother to Billie Jackson (Devon Anderson) and although she is not blood-related to the other Jackson children, Bianca (Patsy Palmer), Robbie (Dean Gaffney) and Sonia (Natalie Cassidy), she loves them as if she were. Blossom is a great support to Carol during her time living in Albert Square, often providing a sympathetic ear when she needs a shoulder to cry on. She works in Kathy Beale's (Gillian Taylforth) café and has a brief romance with Walford lothario Jules Tavernier (Tommy Eytle), even moving in with him temporarily when the Jacksons' house is damaged in a gas explosion. However, their relationship does not progress into anything serious.

She later embarks on a more serious relationship with local barber Felix Kawalski (Harry Landis). Felix is a Jewish Holocaust survivor who was separated from his family as a child. Even though Felix does not know where his family are or even if they are still alive, he has spent his whole life trying to find them. He eventually tracks his sister down in Israel, and after making contact with her, he decides to live with her there. He later returns for a brief visit to ask Blossom to move there with him, and she accepts his offer and leaves Walford in 1997.

Off screen, Blossom later returns to England to live with Alan and Billie in Balham. By February 2010, Alan and Carol have apparently split, with Carol and Billie moving to back to Walford and Alan to Forest Hill, leaving the whereabouts of Blossom unknown.

=== 2010 ===
However, she returns to Walford in October 2010 with Alan, his wife and their son Kai (Shay Spencer), for Billie's funeral after he dies in his sleep while celebrating his 22nd birthday. When Carol says she cannot go to the funeral, Blossom tells her they are saying goodbye to Billie no matter what. Afterwards, she tries to convince Carol to go to the wake as she has rejected her entire family. At Billie's wake, Blossom realises that Carol's nephew Bradley Branning (Charlie Clements) has not attended and is told that he died several months earlier. She mentions that her partner Felix died in 2006. She and her family return home after the wake.

== Reception ==
Author Stephen Bourne criticised EastEnders for wasting the talent of their black actors, using Mona Hammond and her portrayal of Blossom as an example of this, suggesting that much of Blossom's cultural history and personal life remained undisclosed and questioned why she was never seen talking with another black woman of her age. He suggested that after her arrival she became the "invisible woman", adding, "the scriptwriters gave her little to do except serve in the cafe and say one line: 'you want another cup of coffee?'". Bourne suggested that Blossom should have become a matriarchal figure to compare to Ena Sharples from rival ITV soap Coronation Street and suggested that Blossom's scenes with grandson Alan lacked the humour, tension and passion that was seen between other characters in EastEnders, like Peggy Mitchell and her son Grant.
