= Rotgut =

Rotgut may refer to:

- Fusel alcohol, low quality alcoholic beverages
- Flavored fortified wine, inexpensive fortified wine
- "Rotgut", song from the 2003 Tomahawk album Mit Gas
- Rotgut, fictional undead cowboy on the list of Ace Lightning characters
- Rotgut era, an artistic period in the career of Japanese documentary photographer Tadahiko Hayashi
- Rotgut, short-lived American band fronted by American shock jock Anthony Cumia
