= List of Ace Lightning characters =

This articles lists and describes characters from the BBC and Alliance Atlantis-produced children's television series Ace Lightning, which involved characters from a video game materialising in a small American town. The series was told from the point of view of Mark Hollander, a British teenager who is enlisted as the sidekick of superhero of Ace Lightning and do battle against Lord Fear and his minions. The series combined live actors with computer-animated characters.

== Protagonists ==
The series' protagonists were its principle teenage cast, and a group of superheroes known as the Lightning Knights, who come from the game world the Sixth Dimension. The main character is Mark Hollander, who shares the role of protagonist with Ace Lightning.

=== Teenage Protagonists ===
- Mark Hollander (Thomas Wansey): The main protagonist and point of view character, Mark is a 13-year-old British teenager who moves to Conestoga Hill in the United States with his parents. His life is turned upside-down when a bolt of lightning strikes his house, and the characters from his game come to life. He reluctantly agrees to be a sidekick to Ace Lightning, whom he develops a strong, trusting friendship with. Mark wears the central piece of the Amulet of Zoar as a necklace. He juggles the two sides to his life, which has severe effects on his grades and social life. He wants to return to normality, but displays bravery and daring around the villains. He dates Samantha Thompson through half the first season, and then Heather Hoffs, but both break up with him due to his constant excuses when running off to help Ace. In the second season, he falls in love with Kat Adams, but remains on good terms with Samantha. He lacks superpowers, but gains his own arm-mounted gauntlet which can fire out lightning.
- Chuck Mugel (Marc Minardi): Mark's best friend. An overweight, jovial nerd and avid fan of the game, Chuck has an optimistic view on life and would like to beat the game. He is often bullied by Wayne Fisgus, and has a nasty habit of projectile vomiting. However, he is very intelligent, constructing his own working robot to win a science competition. He dates Wayne's cousin Jessica towards the end of the first season. He becomes Ace's secondary sidekick in the second season, wears glasses, and works as a delivery boy for Rick Hummel. Chuck provides his computer technical skills and knowledge of the game to upgrade Ace and Sparx.
- Samantha Thompson (Shadia Simmons): Mark's next door neighbour and girlfriend for most of the first season. She is a popular girl in school, is a cheerleader, and dates Brett Ramirez early in the series but breaks up with him to date Mark, though they remain friends. Samantha is a pragmatic, sensible and forward girl who has a determined attitude. She is fascinated Mark's odd behaviour and pursues an answer, though never gets one. They break up after a disguised Lady Illusion ruins their relationship, though by the end of the first season they reunite. However, Samantha goes to a boarding school in the second season and dates a boy named Jeremy. She returns home and supports Mark dating Kat, ending their romance on good terms.
- Kat Adams (Ashley Leggat): The lead heroine of the second season, Kat replaces Samantha after she moves to a boarding school. Kat moves into town with her parents but is not thrilled to leave the city life and considers running away. She can be moody, brash, and argumentative, but is chatty and inquisitive, pursuing a career as editor of the school newspaper. She strikes up a friendship with Mark, perplexed by his odd behaviour and they eventually start dating. She shows talent in playing basketball and commonly wears flatcaps. She decides to investigate the mysterious events in the carnival, and discovers the existence of Ace and co., taken prisoner by the villains in the finale but is rescued by Mark.

=== Lightning Knights ===
The heroes of the video game, the Lightning Knights are a group of superheroes who guard the Sixth Dimension from evil. The Lightning Knights operate from the Thunder Tower, an unoccupied observatory in Conestoga Hills. They need to constantly recharge their energy using a transformer or will fade away back to the Sixth Dimension. The Lightning Knights search for the Amulet of Zoar's fragments, a triangular-shaped magic artefact which can open portals and summon characters from the game.

- Ace Lightning (Michael Riley): The titular hero of the series and the main hero of the video game. Ace is 32 years old, and has a courageous and witty demeanour, but is confused by the human world. Early in the series, he often enters Mark's house and destroys appliances after accidentally turning them on. He is able to fly, has superhuman strength, and can project blasts of lightning from the wrist cannons he wears. In combat, he can wield the Lightning Lance, and the Shield of Justice which can absorb an attack and redirect it. In the second season, he gains a new pyrokinetic ability called "Ring of Flame". As the series progresses, he develops more a personality and begins secretly dating Lady Illusion. In the second season, Lady Illusion infects Ace with actual human emotions, destroying his original programming, and making him emotionally unstable. However, he manages to adapt and develops an intuition that Kilobyte is controlled by someone. In the last episode, he discovers that he is from the video game, but Mark brings him around. He and Lord Fear join forces and banish Kilobyte to the Sixth Dimension, only for Lord Fear to mortally wound him. It is revealed that the wounded Ace is Lady Illusion in disguise, the real Ace chasing off Lord Fear. Lady Illusion dies in Ace's arms, with Ace expressing sorrow with a single tear.
- Sparx (Deborah O'Dell): A young, enthusiastic Lightning Knight, Sparx is summoned midway through the first season by Mark, but her arrogant and rude attitude causes him to briefly quit the hero business. Sparx is a very gung-ho hero, often charging into battle without a plan, leading to her defeat and capture. Hot-headed, fearless, but loyal to her friends, Sparx is a skilled gymnast and martial artist. She wields the double-edged Sword of Jacob which can emit pink-coloured lightning, and travels around on the Lightning Flash, an aircraft resembling a jetski. She has an aggressive rivalry with Lady Illusion throughout the series.
- Random Virus (Cathal J. Dodd): A 35-year-old cyborg who is Ace's old friend and teammate. Six years prior to the game's storyline, Random was wounded in an accident of some kind that cost him much of his body and damaged his programming. His new body included caterpillar tracks for legs and a large claw in place of his right arm. Random has a split personality with a good and evil side that interswitched, based on the colour of his right eye (red being evil, green being good). His good side fears he will harm his friends, so he hides away in Conestoga Hills' junkyard, while his evil side wants to wipe out everything he considers weak like kindness and heroes. Ace and Lord Fear often vie to recruit him, though he can go so out of control that the two join forces to defeat him. Random was summoned by Dirty Rat using two stolen Amulet pieces. His cybernetic parts allow him superhuman strength and power over machinery.

== Antagonists ==
The villains of Ace Lightning, referred to as the "Evil Gang" in some materials all originate from the Sixth Dimension, save Kilobyte. Led by Lord Fear, the villains operate in the Carnival of Doom, an eerie amusement park. Their goal is to conquer the world using the Amulet of Zoar, though Lord Fear would prefer to destroy the human world. Unlike the Lightning Knights, the villains are blasted into an item located around the carnival that symbolise them, until they recover and emerge again. In the show, they take over the rundown Kent Bros. Carnival.

- Lord Fear (Juan Chioran): The main antagonist of the series, Lord Fear is Ace's nemesis. A 352-year-old lich, Lord Fear is an intelligent but temperamental supervillain who wants to take over the world. He is able to extend his neck and arms like a boa constrictor, and is a powerful magician. He was accidentally crippled by Ace years ago, walking with a limp, and he uses his minion Staff Head as a walking stick and weapon. In his spare time, he plays a pipe organ in the carnival's haunted house and miniature golf. He has a romantic relationship with Lady Illusion, referring to her as "snookums", but she has an affair with Ace that is exposed at the end of the first season. He is defeated after Mark breaks the Amulet, but returns in the second season where his position of power is usurped by Kilobyte. He torments Lady Illusion throughout the season. Kilobyte gives Lord Fear a mode of transport called the Doom Wagon, a motorcycle-hovercraft with a chainsaw mounted on the hood. In the series finale, he joins forces with Ace to defeat Kilobyte but turns against him, mortally wounding Lady Illusion before going on the run.
- Staff Head (Michael Lamport): Lord's Fear loyal minion, Staff Head is a frog-like gargoyle who sits on the end of a bone-shaped stick holding a crystal ball than can shoot energy blasts. He received a character redesign in the second season, becoming an actual frog. He speaks with a Cockney accent, and has a snobbish, cruel personality. He learns of Lady Illusion's relationship with Ace and blackmails her to serve Lord Fear in exchange for his silence.
- Kilobyte (Ted Atherton): The main antagonist of the second season, Kilobyte is known as the Cyber Stalker, and was created by Rick Hummel to defeat Ace and prove his genius. Kilobyte is a bald, tattooed man who can extend four octopus tentacles from his back, which can absorb another character's energy or even upgrade them with new powers as he does with Lady Illusion, giving her the ability to infect Ace with human emotions. He has a cold, grim mind who thinks like a hunter and plots to destroy Ace slowly and painfully. He materializes from the carnival's ferris wheel. Needing a mode of transport, Kilobyte allows a wasp to sting him and take on his powers, causing it to mutate into a giant which Kilobyte can fly on. Kilobyte names it Fred, and is the only character he shows genuine affection for. Kilobtye is eventually freed of Rick's control, and plots to remove humanity from the world and trap them in the game. Ace and Lord Fear join forces and blast Kilobyte into the Sixth Dimension, where he plots to use the imprisoned Rick to escape and return to the real world.
- Lady Illusion (Tamara Bernier Evans): Lady Illusion is introduced as Lord Fear's evil partner and lover. A green-skinned, elf-like woman with an actual spider for hair, she is able to shapeshift into any person or animal. She can also teleport, create bombs resembling crystal balls, and has spider-like agility and reflexes. At first she is obedient and quiet, but quickly grows to hate Earth and strikes out on her own. She is found by Ace, and they quickly fall in love, keeping their relationship a secret with only Mark knowing. Staff Head witnesses Lady Illusion kissing Ace, and blackmails her into stealing Mark's Amulet pieces. She ultimately betrays Lord Fear for Ace in the season one finale. In the second season, she is left behind by Ace when he returns to game, leading her to believe he has abandoned her, so she returns to Lord Fear and steals the Amulet pieces from Mark's house, disguised as a housekeeper named Felicity Fury. Kilobyte gives her the ability to infect Ace with human emotions, which she later comes to regret. Her loyalties are tested throughout the season, until she disguises herself as Ace in the finale and is mortally wounded by Lord Fear after defeating Kilobyte, dying in Ace's arms.
- Anvil (Howard Jerome): The muscle of the group, Anvil is an anthropomorphic rhinoceros dressed in medieval-styled clothes and has a large anvil in place of a right hand. Anvil speaks in third person, is not very intelligent, and has a short temper. He possesses superhuman strength and is on par with Ace when it comes to physical power. However, he is afraid of the dark and becomes cowardly. He is often seen in the company of Pigface. Anvil materializes from the carnival's high striker game.
- Pigface (Keith Knight): A grotesque anthropomorphic boar or warthog, Pigface is 12 years old and a common enemy of Ace. He is able to devour anything, and despite his weight, is fast and strong. He gains an ability to fire a spray of snot from his nose in the second season. Pigface is childlike, unintelligent, and is often seen eating anything he can, usually from the carnival's trash cans. He is sensitive to Ace's wisecracks, and often the first to attack and be defeated. Pigface materializes from a trash can in the carnival.
- Dirty Rat (Adrian Truss): A winged rat dressed as a clown, Dirty Rat acts as Lord Fear's spy, and is the most recurring antagonist after Lord Fear. Sneaky and deceptive, Dirty Rat enjoys spying on others, but is cowardly by nature, hiding behind other antagonists during battles or avoiding conflict all together. Along with flight, he has enhanced senses of smell and hearing, and can create bombs identical to Lady Illusion's. He materializes from a gargoyle that sits outside the haunted house. He strikes up a friendship with Duff Kent, and enjoys Earth's technology. Lord Fear often abuses him, to the point he starts a rebellion against him after he obtains the last piece of the Amulet, but rejoins Lord Fear when he obtains the other fragments. He becomes Kilobyte's minion, but is abused by him as well. In the finale, Dirty Rat flees the carnival with Lord Fear after Kilobyte's defeat.
- Googler (Richard Binsley): A 33-year-old insane, maniacal jester, Googler is summoned by Lord Fear after obtaining an Amulet fragment in the first season's seventh episode "Only Human". Imprisoned in a place called White Hot Oblivion by Ace, Googler seeks revenge against Ace. He speaks in third person and creates his own vocabulary of words like "googlerize" (an alternate use of "pulverise"). He wears a spiked shell on his back, which he can curl into, turning him into a dangerous, fast-moving bouncing ball. Googler wears two talking sock puppets named Zip and Snip (voiced by the series' character designer Matt Ficner), who are able to fly, can chew through any surface, absorb powers, and zombify Ace in one episode. Googler materializes from the carnival's puppet show theatre.
- Rotgut (Robert Tinkler): An undead but stereotypical cowboy introduced in the second season, Rotgut is a fairly useless and clumsy villain. His body parts often fall off, forcing Rotgut to crawl around after them. He speaks with a Southern accent, and has a sensitive nature, preferring to be called the "walking dead" rather than a zombie. He materializes from the carnival's miniature golf course. Rotgut develops a one-sided friendship with Chuck, and stalks him so he can turn him into a zombie. Rotgut shows an ability to possess people, hijacking Chuck's body, forcing Mark to babysit him until he is removed. He becomes friends with Dirty Rat and Duff.
- Duff Kent (Philip Williams): The owner of the Kent Bros. Carnival, Duff becomes a slave of Lord Fear after they invade the funfair. He tolerates Lord Fear's presence, often grovelling in front of him for his own safety, and only wants to run his business normally. He forms a close friendship with Dirty Rat, bonding over their misery in life and desire to make money. Duff drives an ice cream truck called the "Dairy Wagon", which the villains use for transport. Duff rebels against Lord Fear in the season one finale, aiding in the fight against him, but ends up working with him again in the second season, though on a more even level. He refers to the game characters as cartoons.
- Giant George Wayne: A large cowboy-like golem who appears in the series' tie-in video game and the second season. In the series, Sparx encounters him when trapped in the game but defeats him with help from Chuck. In the PC and PlayStation 2 version of the game, he acts as part of a boss battle with Dirty Rat.

== Supporting characters ==
- Pete Burgess (Devon Anderson): Mark's best friend who lives in England. They communicate through webcam messages at the start of most episodes, and he is the first person who learns about Ace Lightning after Mark and Duff. Pete often gives advice to Mark regarding his social life and superhero work. He visits Mark in the first season, but is captured by Lord Fear as a hostage, and decides it would be better to remain as a bystander in the characters' conflict.
- Wayne Fisgus (Jorgan Hughes): A teenager in Mark's class who bullies Chuck. He maintains an intimidating attitude but is easily frightened, wears a baseball cap at all times, and refers to Chuck as "Upchuck" due to his nauseous nature. Wayne's father appears in the first season, being a boastful hunter who exaggerates his adventures in the wild. Wayne often goes looking for Lord Fear, who he refers to as the "Bone Man", and is frightened by him.
- Jessica Fisgus (Megan Park): Wayne's cousin who debuts near the end of the first season. She and Chuck meet at a school gathering of the Ace Lightning fanclub, revealing they have unknowingly been in contact for months under internet aliases. They start dating in the second season, Jessica wishing for a sturdy relationship and often refer to Chuck by his full name when he does something wrong. She is talented with computers.
- Brett Ramirez (Brandon Carrera): Samantha's boyfriend in the first season. He is a popular boy in school, on the soccer team, and is implied to come from a rich family. He is shown to be a friendly, understanding guy and listens to Samantha when she expresses her concerns for Mark, even after Samantha and he break up. He dates Heather in the second season, putting up with her snobbish attitude, but eventually breaks up with her due to her vendetta against Mark.
- Heather Hoffs (Petra Wildgoose): Samantha's best friend. She is a chatty, enthusiastic girl who pursues Mark after Samantha breaks up with him. Heather attends karate lessons, and enjoys martial art films starring Jackie Chan. Heather is not as forgiving towards Mark as Samantha, and dates Brett in the second season. However, she maintains a grudge against Mark, becoming very snobbish and mean until Brett breaks up with her in the season finale.
- Simon and Fiona Hollander (Ned Vukovic and Susan Danford): Mark's parents who moved from England to America. Simon is an excitable man who is fascinated by America's gadgets but has a habit of damaging them or ruining his wife's garden with them. He works as an accountant. Fiona works as a real estate agent, and is very protective of her garden, believing something in their life should remain British. She is particularly fond of her garden gnomes.
- Ashley Hollander (Kayla Perlmutter): Mark's young cousin. She learns of Ace's existence early on in the series, promising to keep her discovery a secret. In the second season, she wants to get involved in Mark's adventures but is rejected, but she helps Chuck escape from the game world.
- Rick Hummel (Brett Heard): A central figure in the second season, Rick Hummel runs a computer repair store in Conestoga Hills and employs Chuck. Rick is actually a programmer on the game who developed an ability to bring the characters to life, only to be mocked and fired from the development company. Beforehand, he programmed the software into one of the game discs, namely the one Mark purchased. He appears in the second season, observing the characters as the Master Programmer, operating from the backroom of his store where he owns a large mainframe that contains the Sixth Dimension. Rick creates Kilobyte after Lord Fear's defeat, intending to use him to defeat Ace and prove to the world of his apparent genius. Mark and Chuck discover Rick's actions, but a blackout causes him to lose control of Kilobyte. Kilobyte then imprisons Rick in the game, where he joins him in the finale, plotting to use him to escape the game world.
- Mr. Cheseborough (R.D. Reid): Horace Cheseborough is a science teacher who teaches Mark. He is a grouchy man who has little faith in his students, taking pleasure in marking their daily quizzes incorrectly and wears badges flattering himself. He is kidnapped by Lord Fear as part of a plot to defeat Mark, and replaced temporarily by Lady Illusion. He is released but has his memory erased. However, he recalls his imprisonment and becomes convinced he was abducted by aliens. In the second season, he encounters Lord Fear again, who manipulates him into creating a formula that can drain Ace of his powers. Mark convinces him he has been tricked, and they make an agreement that Mark must protect him from the "aliens". Kilobyte captures Mr. Cheseborough and traps him in the game, but Chuck manages to free him. Mr. Cheseborough is so terrified he goes on a panicked rampage around the carnival, and is declared a madman by the authorities.
- Nettie Kutcher (Diane Douglass): The lunchlady at the middle school, Mrs. Kutcher is very motherly towards Chuck, often creating for him special meals since he is the only one who appreciates her cooking.
- Coach (David Huband): The unnamed gym teacher and soccer team coach at the middle school. He strives to train his team well, is easily impressed, but a bit bumbling at times. He is a secret fan of Ace Lightning.
