= Richard Evans (Canadian composer) =

Richard Owain Evans is a Canadian keyboardist and composer of film and television music. His television scores include Rescue Mediums, Glenn Martin DDS, Ice Pilots NWT, Care Bears: Welcome to Care-a-Lot and Pyros.

== Career ==
Evans was nominated for a Gemini Award in 2010 for "Best Original Music for a Lifestyle/Practical Information or Reality Program or Series" for the Rescue Mediums episode "Rockside - The Shape of Things to Come".

Evans also composes new-age music and is a live keyboard performer. He was part of the band in the Toronto staging of the musical Come From Away in 2019.

== Personal ==
His wife, Tamara Bernier Evans, is an actress and director. They have two children.
