= Mona Hammond =

Jamaican-British actress (1935–2022)

Mona Hammond OBE
- Hammond as Blossom Jackson in EastEnders
- Born: Mavis Chin; 23 March 1935; Tweedside, Clarendon Parish, British Jamaica
- Died: 4 July 2022 (aged 87); Hounslow, London, England
- Other name: Mona Chin
- Education: Royal Academy of Dramatic Art
- Occupation: Actress
- Years active: 1964–2016
- Television: EastEnders (1986, 1994–1997, 2010)
- Spouses: Michael Sanders (m. 1965; div. 1971) John Pedler (m. 1973; div. 1987)
- Children: 1

Mona Hammond OBE (born Mavis Chin; 23 March 1935 – 4 July 2022) was a Jamaican-British actress and co-founder of the Talawa Theatre Company. Born in Tweedside, Jamaica, Hammond immigrated to the United Kingdom in 1959, where she lived for the rest of her life. Hammond had a long and distinguished stage career. She was best known for her work on British television and played Aunty Su Su in the Channel 4 sitcom Desmond's and Blossom Jackson in the BBC soap opera EastEnders.

Hammond was made an OBE in the 2005 Queen's Birthday Honours List for her services to drama. In 2018, she was awarded the Women of the World Lifetime Achievement Award for her long and distinguished theatre career and for championing Black British actors with the Talawa Theatre Company.

== Early life ==
Hammond was born Mavis Chin, on 23 March 1935, in Tweedside, Clarendon Parish. Her father was Chinese and her mother was Afro-Jamaican. She moved to the United Kingdom in 1959 on a Jamaican scholarship and worked for Norman and Dawbarn Architects. She attended evening classes at the City Literary Institute in London for two years and was awarded a scholarship to the Royal Academy of Dramatic Art (RADA), graduating in 1964.

== Career ==
Hammond began her acting career as a voice actor when she appeared as Minette in the 1964 radio play adaptation of Roger Mais's novel Brother Man. Soon thereafter, she acted the role of Carole in Claude Whatham's television movie A Question of Hell (1964). She also made early appearances on television shows such as Softly, Softly (1968) and The Troubleshooters (1969). Her first leading role was as Lady Macbeth at the Roundhouse in 1970 in Peter Coe's African version of the play. She starred in many plays by an array of up-and-coming black writers: Sweet Talk by Michael Abbensetts, 11 Josephine House by Alfred Fagon and several plays written by Mustapha Matura, including As Time Goes By, Play Mas and Playboy of the West Indies. She also spent two years at the National Theatre in productions including Fuente Ovejuna and Peer Gynt directed by Declan Donnellan, and The Crucible.

In 1985, Hammond, along with Yvonne Brewster, Inigo Espejel and Carmen Munroe, founded Talawa Theatre Company, which became one of the UK's most prominent black theatre companies. It has produced award-winning plays about the African diaspora, and championed reinterpretations of classical British pieces. Hammond performed in several of its productions, including The Black Jacobins, The Importance of Being Earnest and King Lear.

Television work followed, which included roles in The Sweeney (1976); Wolcott (1980–81), a three-part ATV mini-series about a black detective based in east London; Black Silk (1985); Juliet Bravo (1985); Playboy of the West Indies (1985), Casualty (1986) and When Love Dies (1990). Hammond appeared in ITV's Coronation Street twice, first playing the role of Jan Sargent, and the second time playing Velma Armitage, mother of Shirley Armitage in 1988.

In 1994, she was cast as Blossom Jackson in the BBC soap opera EastEnders. She remained in the role until 1997. This was Hammond's second character in the soap, having previously played the minor part of Michelle Fowler's midwife in 1986. She was also an occasional actress in the BBC radio soap opera The Archers, playing Mabel Thompson, the mother of Alan Franks' (John Telfer) deceased wife.

Hammond played many roles in television sitcoms, including Susu in Desmond's (1990–94) and its spin-off Porkpie (1995–96); Us Girls (1992–93), in which she played Grandma Pinnock; Chef! (1996), and Grandma Sylvie Headly in The Crouches (2003–05).

In 1999, Hammond played the role of Nan in the children's TV series Pig-Heart Boy, based on a novel by Malorie Blackman. Hammond's other television credits included Making Out (1989); Trial & Retribution (1998) as Bibi Harrow: Sunburn (1999); Storm Damage (2000); The Bill (2001); Babyfather (2001); White Teeth (2002); A Touch of Frost (2003); Holby City (2001; 2005; 2011); Doctors (2006) and Death in Paradise (2011). She also appeared in the Doctor Who episode "Rise of the Cybermen" as Mickey Smith's blind grandmother Rita-Anne in 2006. Her film credits included Fords on Water (1983), Manderlay (2005) and Kinky Boots (2006). Hammond appeared in the 2008 movie 10,000 BC, directed by Roland Emmerich.

For a brief stint in October 2010, she reprised her role as Blossom Jackson in EastEnders: appearing in connection with screen great-grandson Billie Jackson's funeral, she returned with her on-screen grandson Alan Jackson.

== Awards ==
Hammond was appointed an Officer of the Order of the British Empire (OBE) in the 2005 Birthday Honours, for services to drama. In 2006, Hammond was presented with the Edric Connor Inspiration Award, the Screen Nation Film and Television Awards' highest UK honour. In 2018 she was awarded the Women of the World Lifetime Achievement Award for her long and distinguished theatre career and for championing Black British actors with the Talawa Theatre Company.

== Personal life and death ==
Hammond was married to Michael Sanders from 1965 to 1971 when the couple divorced. They had a son, Matthew. She married again in 1973 to John Pedler, they divorced in 1987. In her later years, Hammond moved to Brinsworth House, a retirement home for entertainers in Twickenham. In 2018, she welcomed Meghan, Duchess of Sussex, on a royal visit to the home.

Hammond died in Hounslow, London, on 4 July 2022, at the age of 87. She is survived by her son Matthew and granddaughter Tallulah.

== Filmography ==
=== Features ===
Year	Title	Role	Notes
1967	Herostratus	Sandy	
1983	Fords on Water	Winston's Mother	
2002	Pure	Woman Customer	
2004	The Life and Death of Peter Sellers	Ruth Attaway / Louise the Maid	
2005	Manderlay	Old Wilma	
2005	Imagine Me & You	Mrs Edwards	
2005	Kinky Boots	Pat	
2007	10,000 BC	Old Mother	
2009	Burlesque Fairytales	Death's Wife	
2009	Ladies Who Lunch	Betty	
2011	Coriolanus	Jamaican Woman	
2016	Bucky	Rita	Short

=== Partial Television Credits ===
Year	Title	Role	Notes
1964	Play of the Week	Carole	Episode: "A Question of Happiness"
1968	Thirty-Minute Theatre	Nurse Barnes	Episode: "Father's Day"
1968	Softly, Softly	Nora	Episode: "For a Rainy Day"
1969	The Troubleshooters	Secretary	Episode: "It's a Very Bad Day for Travelling"
1970	Callan	Nurse	Episode: "Where Else Could I Go?"
1970	Special Branch	Veronica Williams	Episode: "Love from Doris"
1974	Who Killed Lamb?	Nurse	
1986; 1994–1997; 2010	EastEnders	Midwife, Blossom Jackson	240 episodes
1988	Coronation Street	Mrs. Amitage	3 episodes
1989–1994	Desmond's	Aunty Susu	4 episodes
1992–1993	Us Girls	Grandma Pinnock	
1999	Pig-Heart Boy		
2003–2005	The Crouches	Grandma Sylvie Crouch	12 episodes
2006	Doctor Who	Rita-Anne Smith	Episode: "Rise of the Cyberman"
2007	New Tricks	Betty	1 episode
2012	Whitechapel	Voodoo Lady	1 episode
2013	Run	Pam	Episode: "Richard"
