= Ace Lightning =

Children's television series

- Genre: Superhero; Action/Adventure; Comedy; Science fantasy; Teen drama; Children's television series
- Created by: Jim Corston; Rick Siggelkow
- Developed by: Jeff Beiderman
- Starring: Thomas Wansey; Marc Minardi; Shadia Simmons; Ashley Leggat; Michael Riley
- Opening theme: "There's a Hero" by Four Square
- Countries of origin: United Kingdom; Canada
- Original language: English
- No. of seasons: 2
- No. of episodes: 39

Production
- Running time: 24 minutes
- Production companies: Alliance Atlantis; BBC

Original release
- Network: CBBC
- Release: 4 September 2002 – 18 May 2005

Ace Lightning is a children's television series co-produced by the BBC and Alliance Atlantis. The series was originally broadcast in the United Kingdom, but also aired in other countries, including the United States, Australia, New Zealand and South Africa. The show was filmed in Canada, but the program was set in the United States. It ran for two seasons and spawned a number of merchandising products. The series premiered on 4 September 2002 and ended on 18 May 2005.

The programme featured live actors interacting with computer-animated characters from a fictional video game. The series is significant in that until its creation, live action and CGI had not been attempted to such a huge and constant degree within a weekly television series.

== Series overview ==
The series follows the life of British teenager Mark Hollander, who moved to the American town Conestoga Hills with his parents. One stormy night, Mark plays his favourite video game, the fictional Ace Lightning and the Carnival of Doom–a superhero-based adventure game where hero Ace Lightning traverses the Carnival of Doom to find the pieces of the magical Amulet of Zoar, whilst battling his nemesis Lord Fear. Mark stumbles across a mysterious seventh level, which is not meant to exist. A lightning bolt strikes the antenna on his roof, and through an electrical surge, the characters of the game come to life. Ace hires Mark as his sidekick to fulfil the game's objectives in the real world. Mark's life is turned upside down, and his duty as a Lightning Knight affects his school grades and social life, often forcing him to make excuses for his family and friends. Meanwhile, Lord Fear's group of villains occupy the town's rundown Kent Bros. Carnival.

Most episodes balanced Mark's social issues and dealing with the game characters, and the animated characters fighting over the collected amulet pieces. The world and rules of the game played out in Conestoga Hill; for example, when two pieces of the Amulet were connected, a new character or weapon would be summoned. Four human characters learned of Mark's double life, including his best friend Chuck Mugel, girlfriend Kat Adams, school teacher Mr. Cheseborough who comes to the belief that the characters are aliens, and Mark's cousin Ashley. Another character who is aware of the goings on is Duff Kent, the owner of the carnival who is shanghaied into being a minion for Lord Fear. An ongoing story was the love triangle between Ace and villain Lady Illusion, who was Lord Fear's mistress throughout the first season but betrays him in the finale.

The first season ended with Mark winning the game, with all the antagonists save Lady Illusion returning to the game world. In the second season, Chuck becomes Ace's secondary sidekick, and all the villains return under the leadership of a new antagonist named Kilobyte. Kilobyte was created by Rick Hummel, a computer repairman and former games developer who took on the alias of the "Master Programmer". Rick developed the program that brought the game to life, but was ridiculed and fired as a result. He desired to prove his worth by bringing the characters to life and ultimately conquering the world. A blackout in his shop allows Kilobyte to become independent, determined to rule the world. In the series finale, Ace and Lord Fear join forces and banish Kilobyte to the game world. However, Lord Fear turns on Ace and mortally wounds him, only to reveal that Lady Illusion took his place, and she dies in Ace's arms.

== Characters ==
=== Main characters ===
- Michael Riley as Ace Lightning: The titular character, the playable character from the fictional game Ace Lightning and the Carnival of Doom. A superhero and Lightning Knight from the Sixth Dimension, Ace recruits Mark as his sidekick to defeat Lord Fear.
- Thomas Wansey as Mark Hollander: The main protagonist, a 13-year-old British boy who moves to Conestoga Hills with his parents at the beginning of the series. Drawn into the battle of good and evil between Ace Lightning and Lord Fear, Mark reluctantly becomes Ace’s sidekick to win the game.
- Marc Minardi as Chuck Mugel: Mark’s best friend, a bullied but intelligent boy who is a fan of the game. He becomes aware of the game characters in the second season, becoming Ace’s secondary sidekick, mistakenly named “Chuckdude” by Ace.
- Shadia Simmons as Samantha Thompson: The most popular girl in school, Mark’s next-door neighbour, and girlfriend in the first season. In the second season, Samantha attends boarding school, appearing as a special guest.
- Ashley Leggat as Kat Adams: A new addition in the second season, Kat is a brash and inquisitive new girl who becomes Mark’s girlfriend.
- Juan Chioran as Lord Fear: Ace’s arch nemesis and main antagonist of the series. A 352-year-old lich, Lord Fear, seeks revenge on Ace for crippling him and then imprisoning him in the Sixth Dimension. He rules over the Carnival of Doom, collecting the pieces of the Amulet of Zoar to use to rule the world.
- Tamara Bernier Evans as Lady Illusion: A shapeshifting villain, Lady Illusion is introduced as Lord Fear’s partner in love and crime. She develops a turbulent romance with Ace, testing her loyalties throughout the series.
- Deborah Odell as Sparx: A young, impetuous and daring Lightning Knight.
- Cal Dodd as Random Virus: A cyborg Lightning Knight and Ace’s friend, Random suffers from two clashing programs, one good and one evil. He is often sought out by Ace and Lord Fear to join their causes; as such, he hides in Conestoga Hills’ junkyard.
- Ted Atherton as Kilobyte: The main antagonist of the second season. Known as the Cyber Stalker, Kilobyte was created by the Master Programmer to conquer the world on his behalf. He has the cold, calculating mind of a hunter, possessing unlimited powers.

=== Recurring cast ===
- Michael Lamport as Staff Head: The figurehead who perches on the end of Lord Fear's staff.
- Adrian Truss as Dirty Rat: A winged rat clown who serves as Lord Fear's cowardly spy.
- Howard Jerome as Anvil: A dim-witted rhinoceros who acts as the muscle for Lord Fear’s gang.
- Keith Knight as Pigface: A grotesque, childish warthog minion.
- Richard Binsley as Googler: A maniacal jester summoned by Lord Fear early on the series, who has a grudge against Ace for trapping him in another dimension.
- Matt Ficner as Zip and Snip: Googler’s animated sock puppets.
- Robert Tinkler as Rotgut: An undead cowboy introduced in the second season, Rotgut is an overemotional zombie whose limbs fall off and prefer to be called the "walking dead".
- Philip Williams as Duff Kent: The owner of the Kent Bros. Carnival, which becomes the Carnival of Doom. He also drives an ice cream truck, which the villains use as a mode of transport.
- R.D. Reid as Horace Cheseborough: Mark’s apathetic science teacher in junior high, and homeroom teacher in high school. He repeatedly encounters the game characters, becoming convinced they are extra-terrestrials.
- Devon Anderson as Pete Burgess: Mark’s friend in London, who he communicates with via webcam at the start of each episode.
- Jordan Hughes as Wayne Fisgus: A school bully who targets Mark and Chuck, and Jessica’s cousin. He is often frightened by Lord Fear, who he refers to as the “bone man”.
- Megan Park as Jessica Fisgus: Chuck's girlfriend and Wayne's cousin.
- Brandon Carrera as Brett Ramirez: Samantha’s boyfriend in the first season, a popular skateboarder and soccer player.
- Petra Wildgoose as Heather Hoffs: Samantha’s gossipy best friend and Mark’s girlfriend during the second half of the first season.
- Ned Vukovic as Simon Hollander: Mark’s father, an accountant who enthusiastically embraces American culture.
- Susan Danford as Fiona Hollander: Mark’s mother, a fussy real estate agent.
- Kayla Perlmutter as Ashley Hollander: Mark’s younger cousin.
- Diane Douglass as Nettie Kutcher: A matronly dinner lady at Conestoga Hills Elementary School.
- David Huband as Coach: The coach of the elementary school’s soccer team, and secret Ace Lightning fan.
- Brett Heard as Rick Hummel: A computer repairman, who is in actuality, the secret designer of the video game. He is an antagonist in the second season, operating as the Master Programmer, using Kilobyte in his own plans for world domination.

== Episodes ==
=== Season 1 (2002–03) ===
The season aired between September 2002 and March 2003. When broadcast in America, the episodes were shown out of order, which sometimes resulted in severe continuity errors. For instance, "Tunnel of Love" was shown before "Once Upon a Hero". Random Virus would show up as an established character of the day before he would be established. The runtime of each episode was 24:59.

Chapter	No. in season	Title	Directed by	Written by	Original release date
1	1	"The Game Begins"	Don McCutcheon	Sean Kelly	2 September 2002
During a stormy night, Mark Hollander plays a video game, Ace Lightning and the Carnival of Doom, discovering a seventh level that should not exist. A lightning bolt strikes the house, causing the game's characters to come to life in Mark's backyard. Ace Lightning recruits Mark as his sidekick to collect the pieces of the Amulet of Zoar, and capture his arch nemesis Lord Fear, who takes up residence at the rundown Kent Bros. Carnival. Mark starts his first day at Conestoga Hills Middle School, and later receives a piece of the Amulet from Ace. Ace finds the carnival but is captured by Lord Fear's gang.
2	2	"The Trap is Set"	Graeme Lynch	Sean Kelly	3 September 2002
Mark informs his friend Pete about the game coming to life. Ace is imprisoned and tortured by Lord Fear and his minions. Mark, accompanied by his new friend Chuck Mugel, travels to the carnival and tries to rescue Ace, but flees. That night, the carnival opens to the public, allowing Mark to sneak back in and free Ace. He then discovers Dirty Rat, disguised as a stuffed rabbit, plans to bomb Samantha Thompson and Brett Ramirez. Mark throws the rat skyward, Ace grabbing the bomb and disposes of it.
3	3	"The Substitute"	Don McCutcheon	Sean Kelly	4 September 2002
Lord Fear and Pigface kidnap Mark's science teacher, Mr. Cheeseborough, and replace him with Lady Illusion in disguise, as part of a trap to destroy Mark. In class, Lady Illusion puts Mark and Chuck in detention. Realising something is amiss, Mark searches the carnival for the real Mr. Cheeseborough but is cornered by Pigface and Dirty Rat, Ace rescuing him. Samantha instead finds Mr. Cheeseborough, discovering he is being used as a sideshow.
4	4	"Face the Music"	Don McCutcheon	Sean Kelly	5 September 2002
Mark tries to skip school but his parents encourage him to go to detention. On the way to school, the school bus is pursued by Lord Fear and Duff Kent in their ice cream truck, but Ace causes them to crash. Mark helps Ace sneak into the school, while Lord Fear deploys Pigface to back up Lady Illusion. Dirty Rat hypnotises Mr. Cheeseborough to erase his memory of his abduction and then frees him. During detention, Lady Illusion shows a gas bomb at the boys, Chuck becoming delirious. Mark and Chuck flee to the cafeteria, where Ace engages Lady Illusion and Pigface in battle til they flee. Mark worries about Chuck knowing his secret, but Ace reassures him that he won't remember once the gas wears off.
5	5	"There's No Place Like Home"	Gail Harvey	Mark Leiren-Young	6 September 2002
Ace begins to lose energy without a reliable power source to recharge. Mark's class visit Conestoga Hills' observatory, where Chuck tells the urban legend of the Radioactive Guy, a scientist who went mad after being exposed to the radioactive waves of a comet. Mark's cousin Ashley meets Ace, mistaking him for the Radioactive Guy. Ace continues to lose power but comes to Ashley's rescue when she wanders in the carnival alone. Mark takes Ace to the observatory where he is able to recharge, chasing off the villains. Ace decides to live in the observatory, naming it the Thunder Tower. Ashley promises to keep Ace a secret.
6	6	"Opposite Attraction"	Giles Walker	Jeff Beiderman	10 September 2002
Lady Illusion strikes out on her own to find a way back home, stealing Lord Fear's piece of the Amulet. Mark's romance with Samantha is jeopardised when he learns Ace has captured Lady Illusion. However, to Mark's surprise, the two wayward superhumans fall in love. Dirty Rat informs Lord Fear who storms the Thunder Tower to win back his lady. Lady Illusion claims she was trying to steal Ace's piece of the Amulet, which Lord Fear falls for. When Lady Illusion connects the Amulet pieces together, it summons the Lightning Lance, which chases off the villains. At the end of the episode, Mark is able to rebuild his relationship with Samantha.
7	7	"Only Human"	Gail Harvey	Alan Grant	11 September 2002
Lord Fear gains another piece of the Amulet, using it summon the maniacal jester Googler and his puppets Zip and Snip. When Googler confronts Ace, his puppets zap Ace of his superpowers. Ace disguises himself as a police officer and turns to Mark for help, believing he is useless without his powers. Mark rescues Chuck and Samantha from a decrepit treehouse. Ace is lured away by Dirty Rat, allowing Mark to be knocked out by Googler and taken to the carnival, where he is placed into a dunking tank to be devoured by Zip and Snip. Ace confronts the villains, understanding the importance of Mark as a friend, regaining his powers and frees his sidekick.
8	8	"Behind the Mask"	Don McCutcheon	Richard Clark	12 September 2002
On Halloween, Mark throws a party at his house but has to rescue Chuck when Pigface and Dirt Rat mistake him for Ace, since he is wearing an Ace Lightning costume. Meanwhile, Duff turns to Ace for help to rid himself of Lord Fear. When they go to confront Fear, Duff chickens out and tries to set up Ace into a trap, but the superhero escapes, also rescuing Mark and Chuck from their pursuers.
9	9	"Once Upon A Hero"	Graeme Lynch	Neil Richards	13 September 2002
Dirty Rat obtains Ace and Lord Fear's pieces of the Amulet in an attempt to summon his own minion, leading to the arrival of the cyborg Random Virus, Ace's old friend, who suffers from two conflicting programs. Mark is terrified of Random, but plucks up the courage to confront him when Dirty Rat commandeers Chuck's experimental robot to use as a secondary weapon. Ace comes to aid him, Lord Fear also arriving when Duff informs him of the rat's schemes. Mark rescues Chuck's robot and returns it to him so he can win a science competition, while Ace promises to keep an eye on Random, who lives in the town's junkyard.
10	10	"Knights Under Cover"	Don McCutcheon	Jeff Beiderman	17 September 2002
Mark discovers Samantha has gained a part-time job at the carnival and attempts to dissuade her from taking it. Lady Illusion informs Ace of a plan by Lord Fear to use Samantha as bait, but upon returning to the carnival, it is revealed she is in on a secondary trap. Mark and Ace decide to spy on Samantha during her first day, disguised as a girl and a motorcyclist. Wayne Fisgus falls for Mark's girly disguise and flirts with "her". After the carnival closes, Samantha finds herself locked in and under attack by Zip and Snip. Mark rescues her and Chuck, while Ace battles Googler. Lady Illusion throws a bomb at Ace, deliberately missing and hits Googler instead, though Lord Fear dismisses it as a fluke.
11	11	"Tunnel of Love"	Graeme Lynch	Mark Leiren-Young	18 September 2002
Lord Fear kidnaps Random, prompting Mark to help Ace search for him. Mark turns to Chuck for help finding a way to prevent Random from turning evil in the video game, but Samantha, fed up with Mark's constant excuses, dumps him and goes out with Brett. Mark, determined to win Samantha back, follows her onto the Tunnel of Love with Chuck in tow. Inside, he spots Random and goes to rescue him. Lord Fear appears, convincing Random to join his side. Ace crashes in through the roof armed with the Shield of Justice and tosses it to Mark, using its abilities to blast Random with a deflected lightning bolt, restoring his sense of reason. Samantha confronts Mark outside, realising how far he will go to win her back and they get back together.
12	12	"Nobody's Hero"	Giles Walker	Richard Clark	19 September 2002
Mark's social life begins to collapse around him. His grades are failing, his parents ground him, and his relationships sour while Ace struggles to retrieve a new Amulet piece from the carnival. Lord Fear stalks and later kidnaps Mark to seize his piece of the Amulet. Ace rescues Mark and fights the villains while Mark obtains the new Amulet piece, summoning Sparx. However, her condescending comments to Mark causes him to quit being a Lightning Knight.
13	13	"Ace's Wild"	Gail Harvey	Alan Grant	19 September 2002
During a battle against the villains, Ace is zombified by Googler's puppets, rendering him a brainless slave at Lord Fear's command. Sparx flees from Ace, and turns to Mark for help, who is rebuilding his life after quitting the role as Ace's sidekick. However, he has a change of heart when the brainwashed Ace attacks Sparx in his backyard and then targets him. With Chuck's help, Ace is freed of his brainwashing and saves Sparx from Lord Fear. Mark becomes a hero again, earning Sparx's apology and respect.
14	14	"The Field Trip"	Anthony Browne	Jeff Beiderman	16 February 2003
Mark dreads going on a field trip to the carnival, and decides to be honest with Samantha about his feelings and his secret life. At the Thunder Tower, Anvil destroys the Lightning Knights' transformer. Ace tries to repair it, while the rambunctious Sparx decides to take the fight to Lord Fear, but is instead used as bait to lure Ace. Mr. Cheeseborough and the other students are trapped, while the game characters duel. Mark and Samantha free their friends, while Ace and Sparx fight Lord Fear. At the end of the episode, Lord Fear plots to invade Mark's home.
15	15	"Not Alone at Home"	Giles Walker	Sean Kelly	22 February 2003
Mark, Chuck, and Ashley have a horror night, but their night does not go according to plan. Lord Fear, Staff Head, Dirty Rat, and Pigface invade the house, but mostly cause mayhem for themselves. Lord Fear gets stuck in the chimney, Dirty Rat is chased out of the house by a frightened Chuck, Pigface raids a pizza delivery van, and Staff Head is left behind when the villains ultimately retreat. In a subplot, Lady Illusion attempts to assassinate Sparx, leading to a cat fight with Ace caught in the middle.
16	16	"Unidentified Flying Superhero"	Steve Wright	Mark Leiren-Young	23 February 2003
Chuck records Sparx flying overhead on film and mistakes her for an alien, causing a frenzy around town. Googler is accidentally stranded in town and becomes lost when Duff's ice cream truck is taken to the pound, but Lord Fear and Duff later steal it back. Sparx grows overconfident in her skills and wishes to fight Googler, against Ace's advice. Mr. Cheeseborough, having regained his memories of his kidnapping, assumes the villains are aliens and plans to use a homemade radar to locate them. Mark volunteers, but the radar attracts Googler to the school. Sparx confronts Googler, but Zip and Snip grab her sword and blast her back into the game.
17	17	"A Friend in Need"	Anthony Browne	Jeff Beiderman	1 March 2003
Mark's friend Pete visits him, but his easygoing attitude and knack for just about everything makes Mark jealous of him. Pete is eventually targeted by Lord Fear and taken prisoner until Mark hands over his piece of the Amulet. Meanwhile, Random Virus tries to join the villains, but a distrusting Lord Fear chains him up. Random eventually breaks free and goes on a rampage, forcing Ace and Lord Fear to join forces to knock him out, who agree on a truce until their next battle. Pete decides to not meet Ace, believing he is unready, revealing he found life boring in England but decides it is worth living.
18	18	"The Last Laugh"	Wayne Moss	Richard Clark	2 March 2003
On April Fool's Day, Lady Illusion disguises herself as Mark and sabotages his social life in school, while the real Mark is at home with a cold. Lady Illusion, still pretending to be Mark, confronts Ace, but the real Mark enters when he realises something is wrong. Ace uses a practical joke to figure out which is the real one. Mark tries to patch things up with Samantha, but she breaks up with him, gaining the interest of her best friend Heather Hoffs, who has a crush on Mark.
19	19	"Download Disaster"	Steve Wright	Sean Kelly	8 March 2003
Mark tries to recruit Random Virus for help, but his evil side prevents him from being a hero. Mark attempts to give Ace some upgrades with help from Chuck, but the latter's computer crashes, causing Ace to be petrified. Lady Illusion and Dirty Rat witness this, Lord Fear orchestrating Ace's capture. The villains celebrate their victory, but Mark storms the carnival with Random in tow. During the mayhem, Lady Illusion kisses Ace, reviving him. Staff Head witnesses this, discovering Lady Illusion's betrayal, and blackmails her into obedience.
20	20	"Daffy Duff"	Wayne Moss	Jeff Beiderman	9 March 2003
In this clip show episode, Duff speaks to a psychiatrist about his ongoing involvement in the battle between Ace and Lord Fear. Believing the tale to be a moral issue, and caused by stress at work, the psychiatrist advises Duff to take it easy. Duff exits into the waiting room, recognising Mr. Cheeseborough as the next patient. When Duff leaves, the receptionist transforms into Lady Illusion, sent to spy on Duff.
21	21	"The Unlikely Hero"	Don McCutcheon	Alan Grant	15 March 2003
During a fight between Ace and Lord Fear, Chuck is struck by a deflected lightning bolt, temporarily gaining superhuman strength, particularly in his foot, which he nicknames "Thunder Foot". He is made the key player of the school soccer team for an upcoming match against long-term rivals. Lord Fear mistakes Chuck for another of Ace's sidekicks and plots to destroy him at the school, while Ace is distracted at the carnival. Chuck's powers wear off during the soccer match, but the team still manage to win the game. At the end of the episode, Mark and Heather become a couple.
22	22	"The Not So Great Outdoors"	Graeme Lynch	Sean Kelly	16 March 2003
At the carnival, Ace finds a new piece of the Amulet. However, both he and the villains learn Mark has gone camping with his father Simon, Chuck, and Brett. At the campsite, Chuck eats all the food, so the group are invited to camp with Wayne and his boastful father Buck. That night, the villains attack the group but Mark uses Chuck's handheld copy of the game to frighten them away. Ace arrives shortly thereafter and uses the Amulet to summon Sparx back from the game world. Wayne and his dad flee during the night, and Simon is praised for defending the boys from the "wildlife", actually the villains.
23	23	"The Biggest Fan"	Steve Wright	Jeff Beiderman	22 March 2003
Mark has a tough decision to make between going on a date with Heather, or helping Chuck run an Ace Lightning fan club meeting at the school. Lord Fear learns of the fan club and becomes jealous, planning to crash the meeting. Mark initially chooses to go with Heather, but upon learning Lord Fear's plan, changes his mind and sneaks Ace into the school. Chuck meets Wayne's cousin Jessica, also an Ace Lightning fan. Lord Fear crashes the meeting, but Ace leaps out and chases him out of the school, much to the cheers of the fans, who assume Chuck set it up.
24	24	"The Play's the Thing"	Gail Harvey	Mark Leiren-Young	23 March 2003
When Samantha obtains the final piece of the Amulet, both factions hope to gain it during the school play of The Phantom of the Opera. Mark is attracted to Samantha again, and attempts to tell her but does not have the chance. During the performance, Chuck, who is playing the Phantom, throws up. While Mr. Cheeseborough despairs, Mark hijacks the narrative of the play when Lord Fear invades the stage, and is mistaken for Chuck (whose costume was based on Lord Fear's appearance). The play becomes a surprise success, and Dirty Rat obtains the Amulet piece. Sparx sneaks into the carnival but is taken captive by Lady Illusion.
25	25	"The Rat Turns"	Anthony Browne	Alan Grant	27 March 2003
Tired of Lord Fear's abuse, Dirty Rat is encouraged by Sparx to insight a rebellion against his master, rallying Anvil, Pigface, Googler, and Duff to his cause. Staff Head sends Lady Illusion to obtain the Lightning Knights' Amulet pieces or her secret will be exposed to Lord Fear. At school, Mr. Cheeseborough has been promoted to temporary principal, but he has introduced a Nineteen Eighty Four-like regime to the school. Chuck insights his own rebellion against Mr. Cheeseborough, but both he and Mark are summoned to his office. Lady Illusion, disguised as Sparx, convinces Mark to hand over his piece of the Amulet to her. Mr. Cheeseborough agrees to drop his rules if Mark protects him from the "aliens". Lady Illusion gives Lord Fear the collected Amulet pieces, and Dirty Rat surrenders his own, allowing Lord Fear to restore the Amulet. Mark realises he was duped and learns the Lightning Knights will lose power unless they find the Amulet.
26	26	"Game Over"	Don McCutcheon	Richard Clark	28 March 2003
The final battle is at hand. Ace and Sparx try to recruit Random to fight but he refuses to until Ace reminds him of how he used to be a hero. Mark learns from Chuck that he could delete his game file, which would erase the characters too. He speaks with Ace about the truth of the game, but Ace dismisses it and prepares for the battle. At the prom, Chuck worries Jessica won't come, and Heather dumps Mark in favour of Brett. Duff takes Mark to the carnival to find the Amulet, the Lightning Knights arriving shortly after. Lady Illusion reveals her treachery to Lord Fear, and Duff stands up to him. Mark sneaks into the haunted house during the battle. When he fails to beat the game, he considers deleting the file, but realises the Amulet is hidden in Lord Fear's pipe organ. Playing the right notes reveals the Amulet, which he shatters, sending all of the villains sans Lady Illusion back to the game. At the prom, Chuck is thrilled when Jessica arrives, and Mark gets back together with Samantha.

=== Season 2 (2004) ===
The second series was broadcast in most countries in 2004, but it aired in the United Kingdom during the summer of 2005 for unknown reasons. This season was not aired in the United States due to the poor reception of the first season. The graphics were greatly improved, and several of the characters, including Staff Head and Pigface, were changed to look more like the animals they resembled. Kilobyte, Rotgut, Kat Adams and Rick the Master Programmer made their debut in this season. Chuck also met the Lightning Knights, and Mark got his own weapon, allowing him to battle the villains. There were only 13 episodes with one overall storyline. The runtime of each episode was also 24:59.

Chapter	No. in season	Title	Directed by	Written by	Original release date
27	1	"Upgrades"	Don McCutcheon	Sean Kelly	6 April 2005
Mark returns home from England, discovering Samantha is attending a boarding school, while Ace and Sparx plan to return to the Sixth Dimension with Random Virus. However, Lady Illusion interferes when Mark tries to send the heroes back to the game, causing Ace and Sparx to be sent home. The mysterious Master Programmer summons Lord Fear and Staff Head back to the real world. Mark and Chuck begin their first day in high school, meeting new girl Kat Adams, and discover Mr. Cheeseborough is their homeroom teacher. Lady Illusion returns to Lord Fear's side, promising to find the pieces of the Amulet to redeem herself, revealing has disguised herself as Felicity Fury, the new housekeeper of Mark's family. Lord Fear uses two pieces of the Amulet to summon the zombie Rotgut.
28	2	"The Game's On"	Steve Wright	Sean Kelly	8 April 2005
Ace sends an SOS to Mark, which is picked up as Morse code, Chuck deciphering it with help from Mr. Cheeseborough, realising the truth about Mark's game. Mark attends Kat's basketball match at school, giving Chuck his piece of the Amulet. Chuck finds a microchip inside, which has recorded events of the first season. An electrical surge frees Ace from the game, and he appoints Chuck his second sidekick. Lord Fear summons Anvil using more stolen Amulet pieces, continuing his battle with Ace. They take the battle to the school, where Mark helps defeat the villains. Kat wins the game.
29	3	"Uninvited Guest"	Don McCutcheon	Alan Grant	13 April 2005
Mark invites Kat to watch movies at his house, but Heather insights an unwanted house party, getting Mark in trouble with his parents. He also realises that Felicity is Lady Illusion. Lord Fear summons Dirty Rat back into his service, and then lures Chuck into a trap, but Ace comes to his rescue, using his new Ring of Flame upgrade to defeat Anvil. Throughout the episode, Kilobyte the Cyber Stalker, activated by the Master Programmer, watches the other characters from the shadows, plotting to destroy Ace.
30	4	"A Secret Life"	Graeme Lynch	Mark Leiren-Young	15 April 2005
Kilobyte reveals himself to Lord Fear, overthrowing him and taking over the carnival. He upgrades Lady Illusion, giving her the ability to inject Ace with human emotions. Ace soon becomes emotionally unstable, going on a rampage against the villains, rejecting Random and wounding Chuck. Kilobyte plots to let Ace's emotions destroy him.
31	5	"Welcome To the Nightmare"	Don McCutcheon	Jeff Beiderman	20 April 2005
Ace encounters Kilobyte for the first time and is terrified of him. Mark and his classmates go to a friendship farm, where Mark's past relationship with Samantha is revealed to Kat, and she gives Mark the cold shoulder. Ace hides on the farm, while Mark tries to make amends with Kat. Kilobyte, Dirty Rat, Rotgut, and Duff arrive, Kilobyte stinging a wasp with his power, causing it to grow and mutate, naming it Fred. Kilobyte and Fred then battle Ace, while Mark rescues Kat from a malfunctioning quadbike, and they make up.
32	6	"The Search For Sparx"	Graeme Lynch	Mark Leiren-Young	22 April 2005
Ace and Mark are taken captive by Kilobyte and held prisoner in the junkyard. Random's evil side joins forces with Kilobyte, but is troubled by Ace's cowardice. Chuck makes contact with Sparx, but the Master Programmer causes him to be sucked into the game. Mark's cousin Ashley helps Chuck by guiding him through the game, leading him and Sparx to the game's backdoor via a cheat code. Mark inspires Ace to stand up to his fears, battling Kilobyte, in turn inspiring Random to rejoin the Lightning Knights. Chuck and Sparx escape the game and help defeat Kilobyte, who is revealed to be vulnerable to bright lights.
33	7	"Bound To Fail"	Graeme Lynch	Sean Kelly	27 April 2005
Lord Fear once again kidnaps Mr. Cheeseborough, convincing him that Ace is an evil alien and requires the teachers scientific knowledge to be defeated. Kilobyte awards Lord Fear by creating the Doom Wagon, a hoverbike. Cheseborough creates a formula which can drain Ace of his electrical energy, but Mark catches him in the act. Lord Fear chases Mark during his driving test, leading to his failure.
34	8	"Formula For Disaster"	Don McCutcheon	Jeff Beiderman	29 April 2005
Mark has a bad day at school. He goes behind Chuck's back to eliminate Rotgut when he wanders into the school, destroying Mr. Cheeseborough's lab. Mark hides just as both Wayne and Mr. Cheeseborough enter, and Wayne is blamed. Kat plans to write a damning article on Wayne for the school newspaper, but Mark takes responsibility, instead penning a more heartfelt one. Mark admits his blame to Mr. Cheeseborough, encouraging him to end his deal with Lord Fear, and will protect him from harm. Meanwhile, Ace's increasing paranoia about Kilobyte worries Sparx. Confronting him, Sparx hears Ace's theory that Kilobyte is controlled by someone else. Kilobyte obtain another piece of the Amulet, summoning Pigface, but the Lightning Knights defeat him.
35	9	"Choices"	Chris Bould	Unknown	5 May 2005
Samantha returns to Conestoga Hills for a visit and to tell Mark some important news, but keeps getting interrupted. Mark himself must choose between Samantha and Kat, choosing the latter when Samantha reveals she is dating someone else. Lady Illusion flees the carnival when Lord Fear tries to murder her, turning to Ace for help, but the villains kidnap him and Sparx. Lady Illusion warns Mark, who frees them, but in the following battle, loses the sixth piece of the Amulet, which Lady Illusion steals and gives to Lord Fear, summoning Googler.
36	10	"Rotgut Rides Again"	Graeme Lynch	Alan Grant	6 May 2005
Mark grows jealous of Chuck's favouritism in the Lightning Knights, allowing him to be stalked by Rotgut, who possesses Chuck's body. Sparx and then Ace are hurt by Googler's new powers and face oblivion, their own salvation being an invulnerability upgrade offered by Chuck. The brainwashed Chuck arrives at Mark's house, hanging out with a Texan accountant hoping to hire Mark's father Simon. Mark has to protect his friends from the villains, but Chuck is freed from Rotgut's control, rescuing Ace and Sparx. Kat begins to investigate the strange events surrounding the carnival.
37	11	"Putting It Together"	Chris Bould	Alan Grant	11 May 2005
Mark and Chuck investigate an encrypted database on Kilobyte, discovering his origins and confirming Ace's theory that he is a puppet for someone else. The boys stumble into the back room of the computer store Chuck works at, discovering a mainframe containing the world of Mark's game, and realise that Chuck's employer, Rick Hummel, created Ace Lightning. Rick appears, explaining he developed a computer program that could bring the game characters to life, but was mocked and fired, inspiring him to take on the role of the Master Programmer. He inserts a floppy disk containing Kilobyte's last orders, but a power cut causes Kilobyte to become free of Rick's control, vowing to conquer the world.
38	12	"Kilobyte Bites Back"	Chris Bould	Sean Kelly	13 May 2005
Kilobyte begins his plans for world domination, defeating Random, and then targets Rick and Mr. Cheeseborough for elimination. Rick turns to Chuck and Jessica to delete Kilobyte, but the villains invade the school to stop them. Mark is shanghaied into helping protect Mr. Cheeseborough, whilst trying to stop Kat from writing an article about the carnival. While Rick escapes, Mr. Cheeseborough is captured and trapped within the game.
39	13	"The Master Plan"	Chris Bould	Mark Leiren-Young	18 May 2005
Kat connects Ace Lightning to the carnival, but when she tries to interrogate Duff, she is captured alongside Sparx and Random. Kilobyte announces his plans to rule the world by trapping all of humanity within the game, along with the Lightning Knights. He traps Rick in the game too. Lord Fear has his own hidden agenda, forming an alliance with Ace to destroy Kilobyte. Ace discovers he is from a video game, but Mark convinces him that he is real. Ace and Lord Fear systematically defeat the other villains. Chuck frees Mr. Cheeseborough from the game, but Rick remains trapped when Kilobyte restores the Amulet. Ace and Lord Fear defeat Kilobyte, blasting him into the game. Lord Fear then betrays and mortally wounds Ace, who is revealed as Lady Illusion in disguise. Ace chases away Lord Fear, and Lady Illusion dies in his arms. Mr. Cheeseborough is condemned a madman by the police. In the closing scene, Kilobyte orders Rick to free him so he can get revenge.

== Production ==
The show was developed by BBC and Alliance Atlantis, with Rick Siggelkow as executive producer and creator of the show, and Jim Corston as head writer. Originally, the program's plot was to feature a superhero from a comic book coming to life, but it was changed due to children playing videos games more than a pastime than reading comics. Mark was inspired by Spider-Man's alter ego, Peter Parker. The series was in pre-production for two years and took a year and a half to complete the first season. The computer-generated characters and special effects were created by Calibre Digital Pictures, using the Maya system from Alias Systems Corporation.

Matt Ficner designed the computer-generated characters for the series and also provided the voices of Zip and Snip in the first season. The series was shot in Toronto in 2001 between 23 June and 22 November of that year.

== Reception ==
According to the 2003–2004 annual review of BBC Worldwide's children's products, the series was a success and translated into different languages and forty countries, gaining high ratings in the United States on DIC Kids Network. The series received 1.2 million viewers on average during the first season's airing in the United Kingdom.

However, a social argument occurred in 2004 regarding the series' content in relation to the Children's Television Act. Children's television analyst Dale Kunkel, a communication professor at the University of Arizona, described the series and Stargate Infinity as "anti-social". The opinions were shared by the activist groups of the United Church of Christ and Center of Digital Democracy, viewing both programmes as violent. Former CEO of DIC Entertainment, Andy Heyward, defended Ace Lightning, taking the educational requirement very seriously for each episode. Heyward also had the support of Donald F. Roberts, who believed the descriptions given by the activists "mischaracterizes" the series they were attacking.

== Video game adaptation ==
Ace Lightning
- Developers: Absolute Studios (PS2/PC); Tiertex Design Studios (GBA)
- Publisher: BBC Multimedia
- Platforms: Game Boy Advance; Microsoft Windows; PlayStation 2
- Release: Game Boy Advance; 25 October 2002; Windows; 29 November 2002; PlayStation 2; 14 March 2003
- Genres: Action third-person shooter platform
- Mode: Single-player

A video game adaptation titled Ace Lightning was released on PlayStation 2, Microsoft Windows, and Game Boy Advance on 25 October 2002. The game was developed by Absolute Studios and Tiertex Design Studios, and published by BBC Worldwide's core game division, Gamezlab. It was only released in Europe.

The storyline follows the same storyline of the TV series, as Ace Lightning the player collects the pieces of Amulet of Zoar, before facing Lord Fear to defeat him.
