= Thomas Wansey =

British television actor

- Born: 12 December 1986 (age 39); Oxford, England
- Occupation: Actor
- Years active: 1999–2005

Thomas "Tom" Wansey (born 12 December 1986) is an English former actor who most notably played the character of Mark Hollander in the children's TV show Ace Lightning.

== Filmography ==
- Tilly Trotter (1999)
- Tales of Uplift and Moral Improvement (2001)
- Murder Rooms: The White Knight Stratagem (2001)
- Ace Lightning (2002–2004)
- Goodbye, Mr. Chips (2002)
- Keen Eddie (2004)
- Casualty (2004)
- The Giblet Boys (2005)
