= Braceface =

Canadian animated sitcom

- The show's title card featuring lead protagonist Sharon Spitz
- Genre: Comedy drama; Teen sitcom; Teen drama; Animated sitcom
- Created by: Melissa Clark
- Developed by: Alicia Silverstone; Melissa Clark
- Directed by: Charles E. Bastien
- Voices of: Alicia Silverstone (seasons 1–2); Stacey DePass (season 3); Dan Petronijevic; Michael Cera; Tamara Bernier Evans; Marnie McPhail; Peter Oldring; Vince Corazza; Katie Griffin; Daniel DeSanto; Emily Hampshire; Elisa Moolecherry
- Theme music composer: Grayson Matthews Inc.
- Composer: Pure West
- Countries of origin: Canada; China
- Original language: English
- No. of seasons: 3
- No. of episodes: 78 (list of episodes)

Production
- Executive producers: Alicia Silverstone; Michael Hirsh; Patrick Loubert (season 1); Clive A. Smith (season 1); Scott Dyer (season 2); Paul Robertson (season 3); Doug Murphy (season 3); Wallace Wong; Melissa Clark
- Producers: Marilyn McAuley (seasons 1–2); Tom McGillis (season 2); Tracy Leach (season 3)
- Running time: 23 minutes
- Production companies: Nelvana Limited; Jade Animation (Shenzhen) Company

Original release
- Network: Teletoon
- Release: June 2, 2001 – September 1, 2004

Braceface is a Canadian coming-of-age teen sitcom-drama animated television series co-produced by Nelvana Limited and Jade Animation (Shenzhen) Company that aired on Teletoon (now known as "Cartoon Network" in Canada). The show features U.S. actress Alicia Silverstone from the teen comedy film Clueless (who also voiced the title character for the first two seasons) serving as executive producer. The episodes focus on the misadventures of Sharon Spitz, a high school student who often struggles with an unusual ability occurring in her braces, which often makes mishaps in her daily life. Although considered to be an iconic feature in the series, later episodes started to drop this narrative in favour of tackling real-life issues. Unlike most animated TV shows that take place in fictional cities or states/provinces, etc., this one takes place in the real-life town of Elkford, British Columbia.

== Summary ==
The first episode of Braceface, titled "Brace Yourself"

The show, set in Elkford, British Columbia, depicts the travails of a teenaged Sharon Spitz (a play on words, "sharing spit" being a euphemism for kissing), who is a junior high school student with braces that get in the way of leading a normal teenage life. Mainly, her braces are somehow electrically charged at all times, giving her strange abilities such as remotely operating machinery, tapping into wireless communication channels, and even discharging electricity directly into what's in front of her, though much of these abilities are often outside her control. In the first season, she is enrolled at Mary Pickford Junior High, but later on, the show progresses her into attending Elkford High School.

== Cast and characters ==
- Sharon Esther Spitz (voiced by Alicia Silverstone in seasons 1–2 and Stacey DePass in the third and final season) is the lead character of the show. She is of partial Jewish heritage. She is the middle child of the family.
- Adam Francis Spitz (voiced by Dan Petronijevic) is Sharon and Josh's older brother.
- Josh Spitz (voiced by Michael Cera) is Sharon and Adam's younger brother.
- Helen Spitz (voiced by Tamara Bernier Evans) is Sharon, Josh and Adam's divorced mother.
- Maria Wong (voiced by Marnie McPhail) is Sharon's classmate and best friend, who is interracial and is of mixed Chinese and Italian heritage. She is also Brock Leighton's girlfriend.
- Connor MacKenzie (voiced by Peter Oldring) is another one of Sharon's classmates and best friends and Alison's boyfriend.
- Alden Jones (voiced by Vince Corazza) is Sharon's crush at school and boyfriend. They later broke up. Sharon and Alden eventually got back together in the show's final episode.
- Nina Harper (voiced by Katie Griffin) is Sharon's rival and ex-best friend.
- Christy Young (voiced by Janyse Jaud) and Veronique Cruz (voiced by Tabitha St. Germain) are Nina’s two best friends.
- Brock Leighton (voiced by Daniel DeSanto) is Alden's best friend/bandmate and Maria's boyfriend, who is of African-Caribbean heritage.
- Alison Malitski (voiced by Emily Hampshire) is Nina's ex-best friend and later Sharon's new friend. She is soon Connor's girlfriend.
- Hannah Corbett (voiced by Elisa Moolecherry) is the Spitzes' next-door neighbour and Adam's girlfriend.

== Episodes ==
Season	Episodes		Originally released	
Season	Episodes		First released	Last released
1	26	U.S.	June 2, 2001	February 24, 2002
1	26	Canada	June 30, 2001	March 27, 2002
2	26	U.S.	September 27, 2002	January 24, 2003 (10 episodes unaired)
2	26	Canada	September 6, 2002	June 22, 2003
3	26		November 5, 2003	September 1, 2004

== Production ==
The show was produced by the Canadian animation studio Nelvana and Jade Animation (Shenzhen) in China, with the additional pre-production work done by Studio B Productions (Vancouver) and Atomic Cartoons.

== Reception ==
Sarah Wenk from Common Sense Media rated the series three out of five stars, stating "ultimately it's rather lightweight and, well, cartoony. There's nothing wrong with that, but it could use a bit more substance and less silliness." Nancy Wellons from Orlando Sentinel stated "What could be a wonderful premise about the struggle of adolescents to confirm and yet remain individuals instead turns into a half-hour full of inane jokes, cliched characters and bad dialogue." Evan Levine from Newspaper Enterprise Assn. wrote, "The brace subplot sometimes adds an uneasy note — is it fantasy? — and can be vaguely confusing. But the show holds the possibility of being a clever takeoff of the preteen years, whether you have braces or not." Jeanne Spreier from Knight Ridder wrote, "Braceface takes a refreshingly light look at junior high challenges — boys, braces, friends, popularity, parents, school — without giving in to nastiness, violence, ill-will or dejection."

In 2004, the episode "Ms. Spitz Goes to Warsch & Stone" won an award at the Environmental Media Awards.

== Telecast and home media ==
Mainly, it ran on Teletoon (now known as "Cartoon Network" in Canada) from June 30, 2001 until September 1, 2004. With reruns of the show airing on the network until 2007. Corus' linear network Nickelodeon Canada aired repeats of the show on early school mornings at 4:00 AM (11:30 PM until August 29, 2022) from February 28, 2022, until August 26, 2024. YTV also aired repeats from January 3, 2024 until May 27, 2024.

Internationally, the show originally aired on Fox Family Channel (now as "Freeform") in the U.S. for the first season beginning on June 2, 2001, with repeats on the rebranded ABC Family until May 26, 2003. Disney Channel later aired repeats and premiered new episodes from May 2, 2004, until September 1, 2005, but some episodes were edited for content and time. Four episodes ("The Worst Date Ever. Period", "Miami Vices", "Whose Life Is It, Anyway?" and "Grey Matters") were skipped from Disney Channel airings due to their content. Half of season 2 (episodes 16 through 26) and the entirety of season 3 (such as "Busted") never aired in the U.S. until its release on streaming services many years later. The opening theme music was also notably shortened during the show's US airings on Fox/ABC Family and Disney Channel and original Canadian airings on Teletoon. The show aired on Fox Kids and Fox8 in Australia, and Channel 5 along Pop Girl in the United Kingdom. It also aired on Nickelodeon in Germany and South Africa. In India, the series aired on Star One. It aired in Ireland on RTÉ Two from September 3, 2001, until 2005. In Japan, the show was aired on STAR Plus Japan. In the Netherlands, the show aired on now-defunct Fox Kids/Jetix. In Eastern Europe, it aired on Minimax.

In Canada, DVD releases of the show were released by KaBOOM! Entertainment, and in the United States, DVDs were released by Funimation Entertainment.

In the United Kingdom, Maverick Entertainment released a DVD, titled "Brace Yourself" in 27 November 2006, which contains the first four episodes. Fremantle Home Entertainment later released two more DVDs.

Currently, the show is now streaming on both networks, FilmRise Kids and Tubi. The show is also available to stream in pay on Amazon Prime Video, Apple TV, Google Play, and episodes 1–13 on YouTube (thru Corus' Keep It Weird Channel).
