= Billie Jackson =

Fictional character from EastEnders

- EastEnders character
- Devon Anderson as Billie Jackson (2010)
- Portrayed by: Devon Anderson (1993–1997, 2010); Bluey Robinson (2004)
- Duration: 1993–1997, 2004, 2010
- First appearance: Episode 922; 2 December 1993
- Last appearance: Episode 4087; 14 October 2010
- Created by: Tony McHale
- Introduced by: Leonard Lewis (1993); Louise Berridge (2004); Diederick Santer (2010)
- Bluey Robinson as Billy (2004)
In-universe information
- Other names: Billy Jackson
- Occupation: Student; Member of the British Armed Forces
- Family: Branning/Jackson
- Father: Alan Jackson
- Mother: Carol Jackson
- Half-brothers: Robbie Jackson; Kai Jackson
- Half-sisters: Bianca Jackson; Sonia Fowler
- Grandfathers: Jim Branning
- Grandmothers: Reenie Branning
- Uncles: Derek Branning; Max Branning; Jack Branning
- Aunts: April Branning; Suzy Branning
- Nephews: Liam Butcher; Morgan Butcher; Sami Jackson
- Nieces: Bex Fowler; Tiffany Butcher; Julia Fowler; Whitney Dean (adoptive)
- First cousins: Joey Branning; Alice Branning; Bradley Branning; Lauren Branning; Abi Branning; Oscar Branning; Annie Carter; Penny Branning; Amy Mitchell; Ricky Branning; James Branning; Kevin; Rebecca
- Other relatives: Blossom Jackson

Billie Jackson (also known as Billy) is a fictional character from the BBC soap opera EastEnders, played by Devon Anderson from 1993 to 1997, and by Bluey Robinson for a brief return in 2004. The character returned in 2010, along with other members of the Jackson family. It was confirmed in November 2009 that Anderson would reprise the role, 13 years after he was last seen on the soap. He made his return on 4 February 2010. The character was killed-off in October 2010, and made his last credited appearance on 14 October.

== Creation and development ==
1994 was a "historic" year for EastEnders, as in April, a third weekly episode was introduced. Due to the programme's increased frequency, a number of new characters were introduced to the regular cast in the latter part of 1993 and early 1994. Among them were the Jackson family: mother Carol Jackson (Lindsey Coulson), and her four children, Bianca (Patsy Palmer), Robbie (Dean Gaffney), Sonia (Natalie Cassidy), and Billy Jackson (Devon Anderson), as well as Carol's partner, Alan Jackson (Howard Antony). Though Carol and Alan were not initially married in the serial, and though Alan was only the biological father of Billy, the whole family took on Alan's surname. The family was created by writer Tony McHale. None of the actors cast as the Jackson family were matched for appearance or screen compatibility. Cassidy has commented, "it was all decided without doing that. I don't think it particularly mattered that none of us Jackson kids looked like each other because all our characters had different dads!"

Various members of the family began to appear sporadically from November 1993 onwards, but in episodes that aired early in 1994, the Jacksons moved from Walford Towers, a block of flats, to the soap's focal setting of Albert Square. Their slow introduction was a deliberate attempt by the programme makers to introduce the whole family over a long period. The Jacksons were described by EastEnders scriptwriter Colin Brake as a "classic problem family". Anderson was 6 years old when he first appeared on-screen as Billy.

In a 2000 book, author Kate Lock described Billy as "angelic" and a "cheeky, curly-haired cherub whose principal dramatic function seemed to be to generate angst in the bosom of his family". His most notable storyline in his initial stint was also his exit storyline. Following Lindsey Coulson's decision to quit her role as Carol, the Jackson family were written out of the soap in 1997. In the storyline, Billy was kidnapped after witnessing an armed robbery and the whole family was relocated under a witness protection programme until Billy testified in court.

While the majority of the Jackson family returned to the serial, Billy Jackson was not seen again until 2004. It was announced in April that year that the character would be returning briefly to attend the wedding of his sister Sonia. Producers decided not to bring back the original actor, and Billy was played by Bluey Robinson for several episodes in June 2004.

It was announced in October 2009 that the character, now called Billie, would be rejoining the soap along with the rest of the Jackson clan, excluding Alan and Blossom, for a storyline to mark the 25th anniversary of EastEnders in February 2010. At the time the casting for the character had not been finalised; however, it was confirmed in November 2009 that the original actor, Devon Anderson, would be reprising the role 13 years after he had last been seen in the soap. Anderson commented, "I'm really happy to be back at EastEnders playing the role of Billie Jackson again. It was my first acting role and I can't wait to get started again. It is also very exciting that all of the Jackson family will be reunited and I'm sure that will be eventful for the viewers." Executive producer Diederick Santer added, "Viewers will remember Devon as the original Billie Jackson, the cute kid with the big hair. Devon, like Billie, is all grown up, and 12 years on, I'm delighted to welcome this talented young actor back to the show." He later described the character as "interesting", saying "He's a troubled soul, torn between being a good son to his mother and trying to have an exciting London life. And when your mother's Carol Jackson, that's quite a feat." A source told the media website Digital Spy, "Billie's become a young man since the last time we saw him - he might even [be] referred to by his proper name Will. He's still the apple of his mother's eye but is he the angelic family man she wants him to be?"

Talking about the show's 25th anniversary week, Santer explained that he wanted great stories to get people talking, saying "That's [...] why we're doing the soap wedding of the year [...] with Ricky and Bianca. [...] The wedding is the perfect opportunity for us to bring back the much-loved Jackson characters – Carol, Sonia, Robbie and Billie." Anderson said he found it easy to return to the role, saying that "When a child comes into a show, you can't give them a character, so anything that was created for Billie was by me in the early days. Nobody knows Billie like me!" He added that Billie is "clever and very much a dark horse – you never know what you're going to get with him."

On 18 September 2010, it was reported that the character would be killed off the following month after an alcohol-fuelled birthday celebration. Coulson said that although the storyline had "huge shock value", she felt it was too soon to kill off the character, as "there were lots of stories they could have told about Billie."

== Storylines ==
=== 1993–2004 ===
An early image of Devon Anderson as Billie

Billie is the son of Carol (Lindsey Coulson) and Alan Jackson (Howard Antony) and he arrives in Walford in 1993 along with his half brother Robbie (Dean Gaffney) and his half sisters Bianca (Patsy Palmer) and Sonia (Natalie Cassidy). He is very close to his father and when Alan has an affair with the malicious Frankie Pierre (Sian Blake) and moves out of the family home, Billie takes the separation badly. On Christmas Day 1996, he becomes so upset that Alan is not there for the festivities that he runs away from home, prompting most of the Square's residents to abandon their Christmas dinners to search for him. He is found by Nigel (Paul Bradley) and Clare Bates (Gemma Bissix), hiding in a derelict building. They return him to his worried parents and the Jacksons eventually have a happy Christmas together, including Alan.

In February 1997, Billie accompanies his great-grandmother Blossom (Mona Hammond) on a trip to a local building society. Whilst there, the building society is held up at gunpoint and robbed by a gang of masked thieves. Billie and Blossom are unharmed, but another man is shot and killed and Billie, the only witness, gets a glimpse of the thieves without their masks on. Billie is asked to provide testimony and help identify the thieves in a police line-up, which leads to several arrests. Carol remains apprehensive about Billie's involvement throughout the ordeal. In September 1997, the Jacksons hear news that the court case to try the suspected robbers is soon to take place. The family then suffer intimidation from the gang, in order to stop Billie from testifying against them. After picking Billie up from school one day, a "supply teacher" approaches Carol and asks if she can talk about Billie's behaviour. Whilst she is distracted, Billie is kidnapped in broad daylight. After several days of investigation, the police trace Billie and he is reunited with his family. After this, the Jackson family, apart from Bianca, are placed in a witness protection program and rehoused away from the Square for their own safety. They depart on 16 October 1997.

Following the trial, Robbie and, later, Sonia return to Walford and Carol also returns in 1999 when she splits up with Alan for a second time. Billie remains living with his father and grandmother in Balham and Carol later returns to live with them.

Billie returns to the Square briefly in June 2004 to attend Sonia's wedding to Martin Fowler (James Alexandrou), and flirts with Martin's niece, Vicki (Scarlett Alice Johnson), at the reception and gets drunk.

=== 2010 ===
Billie returns to Walford in 2010, calling at Bianca's home, and later attends her wedding. After his cousin Bradley (Charlie Clements) dies, Carol and Billie move back to Albert Square and Billie starts seeing Bianca's adopted daughter Whitney Dean (Shona McGarty). It is revealed that Billie is hiding a handgun in Bianca's home. He tells his former gang mates, Kylie, Connor and Mitch (Elarica Gallacher, Arinze Kene and Theo Barklem-Biggs) that he has disposed of it, but after they arrive in Walford and find the gun, and plan to hold up The Queen Victoria public house. However, Billie is unmasked during the raid and it is revealed he used a water pistol. He then chooses Whitney over his former gang members, so Kylie takes revenge by attempting to shoot Billie with his gun, but accidentally shoots his uncle Jack (Scott Maslen) instead, who is left critically ill in hospital. Blaming himself, Billie announces his plan to join the army, but Carol is opposed to the idea until she discovers the gun came from Billie and tells him the army is the best place for him. When he is accepted into the army, Whitney promises to make the most of their remaining two weeks together. However, he discovers that Leon Small (Sam Attwater) kissed Whitney and is angry when she does not mention it, but she insists she has not cheated on him. Billie apologises, and they reunite before Billie goes away for army training. When Billie is due to return on leave, he tells Carol that the army have denied it. However, Carol, Whitney and Bianca discover that he is taking his leave with friends instead of returning to Walford.

When Billie finally does return to see Whitney, he upsets her by ending their relationship, saying he has changed. He reveals he has started a relationship with a female recruit named Siobhan, and decides he should leave. Whitney's brother Ryan Malloy (Neil McDermott) punches him in the face. Carol overreacts as she wipes the blood off him so Billie snaps at her, saying she causes carnage wherever she goes. He then says she does not have to worry about him as he has a new life now. For Billie's birthday, Carol arranges a birthday party, but discovers from Whitney that he is having a party in Southend-on-Sea. Bianca brings him back to Walford on his birthday, and he makes amends with Jack. At the party, Billie's friends bring a lot of alcohol and his cousin, Lauren Branning (Jacqueline Jossa) brings a bottle of vodka, which Billie drinks in one go. Carol decides to let him to continue to drink as he is an adult and makes his own choices. The next morning, the family think Billie is sleeping on the settee, but Bianca finds him dead when she tries to wake him, having died from choking on his own vomit from alcohol poisoning. His body is later removed by undertakers. Whitney later discovers a text message on her phone from Billie, saying he still loves her and wants to make a go of things again. Billie's personal possessions are brought home to Carol, one of which is his laptop, on which Carol discovers a video of Billie saying he wishes she would drop dead. Billie's funeral takes place on 25 October 2010.

== Reception ==
Billie's death was nominated in the 'Best Single Episode' category at the 2011 British Soap Awards. In October 2011, Anderson was nominated for one award, at the Screen Nation Awards which celebrate the best British Black talent. He was nominated for the Emerging Talent award.
