= List of Braceface episodes =

Braceface is an animated television series that originally aired on Teletoon in Canada and Fox Family/ABC Family and Disney Channel in the U.S.

== Series overview ==
Season	Episodes		Originally released	
Season	Episodes		First released	Last released
1	26	U.S.	June 2, 2001	February 24, 2002
1	26	Canada	June 30, 2001	March 27, 2002
2	26	U.S.	September 27, 2002	January 24, 2003 (10 episodes unaired)
2	26	Canada	September 6, 2002	June 22, 2003
3	26		November 5, 2003	September 1, 2004

In the United States, only season 1 and episodes 1-15 of season 2 aired on television.

== Episodes ==
=== Season 1 (2001–02) ===
No. overall	No. in season	Title	U.S. air date	Canadian air date
1	1	"Brace Yourself"	June 2, 2001	June 30, 2001
Thirteen-year-old Sharon Spitz's teenage life is thrown for a loop when she gets braces put on, but discovers that her braces may have strange electromagnetic powers.
2	2	"Crushed"	June 3, 2001	July 1, 2001
When Connor gets acupuncture to cure his allergies to be with the new girl Tally, Sharon questions whether her newfound infatuation with Connor is real or because of the acupuncture procedure.
3	3	"5 Things That Really Bug Me About You"	June 9, 2001	August 29, 2001
The electricity from Sharon's braces accidentally opens up her friend, Maria's diary, which contains a list of negative traits, prompting Sharon to worry that Maria may not like her.
4	4	"The Doctor Is In"	June 16, 2001	September 5, 2001
Sharon is jealous when Nina starts going to Sharon's mom, Helen, for therapy sessions.
5	5	"The Meat of the Matter"	June 23, 2001	September 12, 2001
Sharon's crush, Alden, gets her a new job at a meat-packing plant, but her chances are jeopardized when she goes vegetarian in protest to the unsavory conditions at the plant.
6	6	"The Makeover"	June 30, 2001	September 19, 2001
Sharon tries to help her big brother, Adam, with his love life by giving him a makeover.
7	7	"Mixed Messages"	July 7, 2001	September 26, 2001
Sharon confesses her infatuation with Alden via cell phone, but the message accidentally gets sent to his friend, Brock.
8	8	"The Worst Date Ever. Period."	July 14, 2001	October 3, 2001
Sharon and Alden's first date together falls apart when Sharon has to help out at Alden's family restaurant. Things get worse when Sharon gets her first period while rollerblading and Alden tries to call an ambulance (as Sharon thinks her menstrual cramps are the pangs from appendicitis), despite his voice changing. Note: The word "period" in the title has a double meaning: the dot at the end of a sentence, and the fact that Sharon had her first period in this episode.
9	9	"The Divorce Thing"	July 21, 2001	October 10, 2001
Living with divorced parents isn't easy, and Sharon learns just that after her Mom begins dating and her father (a rock star with his own band) comes by to visit.
10	10	"Take That"	August 25, 2001	October 17, 2001
Sharon and Maria both resort to stealing items while auditioning for a local TV station's talent search, Maria steals a CD to impress a hip-hop crew, and Sharon steals her mother's favorite earrings, but loses one in a gutter and attempts to shoplift an exact copy to cover her tracks.
11	11	"Twenty Four Hours"	August 4, 2001	October 24, 2001
Sharon's Orthodontist needs to modify the adhesive and removes her braces for 24 hours. Sharon takes advantage of this by enjoying hard-to-eat foods and sees this as her chance to finally kiss Alden, but when she assumes responsibility for babysitting her younger brother, Josh, and Josh goes missing, Sharon must choose between going through the window of opportunity as it narrows or letting it close and doing what she's told. Sharon also realizes that Alden is only worth keeping if he respects her, braces or no braces. Written by Michael Teversham.
12	12	"Driving Miss Sharon"	July 28, 2001	October 31, 2001
Not wanting to feel like a loser, Sharon gets in the front seat of her mother's car, and goes on an unintended joyride, thanks to her braces. When Sharon crashes the car into a tree, she worries that her mom will blame her, but her mom ends up blaming Adam, as he's the only teenager in the house with a driver's license.
13	13	"The Pickford Project"	August 11, 2001	November 7, 2001
Sharon and Maria are upset when, during a wilderness survival project, Nina is chosen to be on their team.
14	14	"Miami Vices"	August 18, 2001	January 9, 2002
Irritated by her mom's constant rules, Sharon jumps at the chance to visit her dad, Richard, in Miami, but discovers that her father can lay down the law as hard as her mom after Sharon goes out partying with Richard's friends and gets drunk on rum and Cokes.
15	15	"The Good Life"	September 8, 2001	January 16, 2002
Sharon, Connor, and Nina are picked to be extras for Leena's latest music video who is Sharon's favorite singer—and Sharon sees that being famous isn't as glamorous as it looks.
16	16	"The Election"	September 1, 2001	January 23, 2002
Sharon runs for class president after Nina is impeached, but faces a smear campaign against her (supposedly) orchestrated by her opponent's campaign manager, Alden.
17	17	"Angels Among Us"	December 1, 2001	December 15, 2001
Sharon must confront her own lack of generosity after she is chosen to give a gift to her nemesis, Nina, Christy and Veronique, for the holidays. Meanwhile, Josh learns more about the Spitzs' Jewish heritage, Sharon's mom is stuck with overtime work, and a strange cousin comes to visit.
18	18	"The Secret"	September 15, 2001	January 30, 2002
Sharon volunteers as a caller for a teen help hotline and mistakes a girl's call about her boyfriend being a "make-out monster" as being a secret about Sharon's brother, Adam. Meanwhile, Alden has issues with his body odor.
19	19	"The Dissection Connection"	September 29, 2001	February 6, 2002
Sharon protests against frog dissection in biology class. Meanwhile, Connor and his girlfriend, Tally, from "Crushed", breakup.
20	20	"Whose Life Is It, Anyway?"	October 6, 2001	February 13, 2002
Sharon gets in two battles of wills: one between herself and her mother over getting a tattoo (despite the fact that Sharon is underage) and one between herself and Connor, the latter of which is having a hard time adjusting to his break-up with Tally.
21	21	"The Easy Way Out"	October 13, 2001	February 20, 2002
Sharon gets addicted to a psychic hotline to get answers about her life and future. Meanwhile, Adam uses his cat, Moishe's, name to get a credit card and play the stock market.
22	22	"Teacher's Pet"	March 2, 2002	February 27, 2002
Maria falls for her substitute English teacher, Mr. Riley, and Sharon supports her friend... until Sharon is told that it's unethical for a teacher to date his students. But is Maria correctly interpreting the teacher's suggestions?
23	23	"Skipping"	November 3, 2001	March 6, 2002
Sharon and her friends, Maria, Brock, Alden, and new member, Carmen, start a garage band and decide to skip school to audition for a spring concert. Meanwhile, Nina and her friend, Alyson, try to prove that Sharon is faking sick to get out of going to school.
24	24	"Camp Kookalah"	November 10, 2001	March 13, 2002
Sharon and Maria go to summer camp, where Sharon is promoted to Counselor-in-Training and must decide between her power as Counselor-in-Training and her friendship with Maria.
25	25	"Stormy Weather"	February 23, 2002	March 20, 2002
Fearing that Alden may not be attracted to her, Sharon turns her attention on a fellow Counselor-in-Training named Jason, but Sharon is shocked when she learns that Maria has sights on Jason too.
26	26	"Twisted"	February 24, 2002	March 27, 2002
Sharon panics when her father announces that he's getting remarried... to Nina's mother... until it is revealed that it was all a dream.

=== Season 2 (2002–03) ===
No. overall	No. in season	Title	U.S. air date	Canadian air date
27	1	"The Social Fabric"	September 27, 2002	September 6, 2002
It's a new year for Sharon and her friends as they start high school. As part of a senior mentor program, Sharon is paired up with Dion, an aspiring fashion designer whose sexual orientation has been called into question. Sharon must choose between ditching her new friend or sticking by him in the face of adversity.
28	2	"14 Candles"	October 11, 2002	September 8, 2002
When Sharon overhears plans about a surprise party on her 14th birthday, she gets excited. But the excitement turns to disappointment (and anger) when she realizes that no one is throwing a party for her. Meanwhile, Alden discovers the pressures of being Sharon's boyfriend.
29	3	"Working Girl"	October 18, 2002	September 13, 2002
Sharon takes a job at a smoothie shop so she can earn money and gain independence. Meanwhile, Connor simplifies his life by weaning himself off consumerism.
30	4	"Dear Alden"	October 25, 2002	September 15, 2002
Sharon ruins her love life with Alden when a letter she wrote out of frustration ends up on the school's website, and Alden gets the message. They both break up.
31	5	"Mommy Nearest"	November 1, 2002	September 20, 2002
Sharon's mother becomes stricter in her parenting after discovering that Sharon has been on an X-rated movie site and has an interest in Adam's friend, Tony.
32	6	"The Friend Zone"	November 8, 2002	September 22, 2002
Sharon enlists the help of a teen magazine's advice column to mend her broken relationship with Alden.
33	7	"The Coolest"	December 6, 2002	September 23, 2002
Sharon enters herself on TV3's "Coolest Teen" contest as a joke, but the joke's on her when she makes finalist and must enter a video about a day in her life if she wants to win the grand prize.
34	8	"Skin Deep"	November 15, 2002	September 27, 2002
Dion selects Sharon to wear a new dress he designed for an upcoming fashion show the school is hosting, but when puts Nina makes disparaging remarks about her body, Sharon puts herself on a crash diet the week of the show.
35	9	"Grey Matters"	December 11, 2002	October 28, 2002
Maria dates an Arab boy named Cloud, but Sharon is worried that Cloud may be abusing Maria. Things get worse when Sharon's grandfather visits and makes prejudiced comments about Cloud and Maria, making Maria think that Sharon is a racist just like her grandfather.
36	10	"Triangles"	December 13, 2002	November 1, 2002
Alyson becomes Sharon, Maria, and Connor's unlikely friend and Connor's girlfriend after Connor is saved by Alyson's father from a fire at the smoothie shop.
37	11	"Vanity Fur"	November 22, 2002	November 22, 2002
Sharon and Maria's friendship with each other hits a snag when Maria is offered the chance to model ski wear lined with real animal fur and Sharon plans a protest against animal cruelty.
38	12	"Lorenza"	January 3, 2003	November 8, 2002
Sharon and Maria find Lorenza, a stray dog, and have three days to give it a home before it gets sent to the pound. Meanwhile, Adam is hired as Maria's butler to raise money for the school's athletic council.
39	13	"Second Thoughts"	January 10, 2003	November 29, 2002
When Sharon's English teacher pairs Sharon with her ex-boyfriend, Alden, Sharon thinks that she and Alden should still be together.
40	14	"Home Alone"	January 17, 2003	April 12, 2003
While Sharon's mom and her boyfriend, David, are on vacation, Sharon is put in charge of the house, which doesn't sit well with her brothers or her friends.
41	15	"Miss Understanding"	January 24, 2003	April 13, 2003
Dion asks Sharon to take over the school newspaper's advice column, which ends up causing trouble for everyone around her.
42	16	"For the Birds"	Unaired	April 20, 2003
Sharon's father gets a day job at the local TV station, and falls for the station's executive, Lauren, whom Sharon cannot stand since Lauren has an exotic bird as a pet, which conflicts with Sharon's belief in animal rights.
43	17	"Oh, Grow Up!"	Unaired	April 27, 2003
Sharon's internship at a veterinarian's office traumatizes her when the animal she was tending to suddenly dies. Meanwhile, Adam takes an apprenticeship as a funeral director.
44	18	"Genesis"	Unaired	May 4, 2003
Sharon feels upstaged during March break when her mother's best friend comes to visit, and all of Sharon's friends are enamored with said best friend's daughter, Genesis.
45	19	"Nina's Nose Job"	Unaired	May 18, 2003
Sharon inadvertently starts a rumor that Nina has had rhinoplasty during the time off school in March. Meanwhile, Maria tries to tell Connor that his bad breath might be impeding in his relationship with Alyson.
46	20	"Baby Think-About-It"	Unaired	May 9, 2003
Sharon gets a lesson in proper parenting when her social studies class assigns everyone a high-tech baby doll to test their skills in responsibility.
47	21	"Ms. Spitz Goes to Warsch and Stone"	Unaired	May 25, 2003
Sharon protests against a cosmetics company that uses animals for testing. Meanwhile, Josh becomes a street musician to earn money for a new suit.
48	22	"When In Rome..."	Unaired	June 1, 2003
Sharon and Maria go to Italy, where (once again) their friendship is strained, this time, over Maria's and her grandparents' conservative values. Brock starts to get into the history of Italy, bringing him and Maria closer. Sharon spends a day with Marcello and they have their first kiss. When Maria and Brock stay out late, Maria defends her friend Sharon from her grandmother and explains the truth about herself and her grandmother accepts this. Maria and Sharon make up. By the end of the episode, Maria and Brock have their first kiss.
49	23	"Pegged"	Unaired	June 8, 2003
Sharon, Maria, and Alyson start their own band while Carmen, Brock, and Alden crossdress to enter a girls-only battle of the bands contest.
50	24	"Aliens"	Unaired	June 15, 2003
A prank war causes rifts in friendships between Brock, Maria, Connor, Alyson, and Sharon.
51	25	"When in Elkford..."	Unaired	June 22, 2003
Feeling left out after learning that she's the only one in the school who isn't dating, Sharon sees her chance to be just like her friends when Marcello (the Italian boy she had a crush on from "When in Rome...") comes to Elkford, but her chance may be jeopardized when Marcello's European ways disconcerts Sharon's friends. Meanwhile, Maria is upset that Brock isn't being romantic like Marcello, and Brock believes that Maria is breaking up with him via letter. It turns out the letter was supposed to go to Marcello instead. This leads to Sharon and Marcello hosting a romantic dinner for Brock and Maria. Maria and Brock then got back together by the end of the episode and Marcello goes out with Sharon's enemy, Nina
52	26	"Up in Smoke"	Unaired	June 13, 2003
In desperate need of a change in routine, Sharon moves in with her father and his new girlfriend, but things get sticky when Sharon discovers that she has a juvenile delinquent named Griffin for a potential step brother. In this episode, Sharon smokes and finds out how truly awful it is.

=== Season 3 (2003–04) ===
No. overall	No. in season	Title	Canadian air date
53	1	"Lucky Break"	November 5, 2003
Sharon takes advantage of Nina's superstitious tendencies when the two girls audition for a play called Dr. Jekyll and Ms. Hyde. Meanwhile, Josh thinks Alyson loves him. Brock is making a play of Dr. Jekyll and Ms. Hyde to impress his dad.
54	2	"Weird Science"	November 12, 2003
When Sharon is paired up with Connor for a science project, Sharon fears that her ineptitude in science will be Connor's downfall, but when Sharon stumbles upon information from Maria and Nina's project she must decide whether to cheat to win or play fair and lose.
55	3	"She Got Game"	November 19, 2003
Maria joins the boys' ice hockey team at school—and Sharon is hired as the team's psychologist to help them with their game anxieties. Then Sharon becomes the unofficial team shrink by helping other players with their psychologically based playing problems. But when Maria has second thoughts about remaining on the boys' team, Sharon puts her own agenda ahead of her friend's. Sharon's braces accidentally electrocute the walkie talkie while talking to the hockey guys and one of them insults Maria, causing Brock to defend her. Maria later get upset when the hockey team coach wants her to do an interview instead of Brock. Sharon and Maria later make up in the episode after Sharon admits that she only joined the team because she wanted everyone else to like her. Maria tells the coach and he accepts her for who she is. Brock also apologizes to Maria for being rude towards her that afternoon and just as they are about to kiss, Sharon interrupts them and tells them about the hockey game. Maria and the hockey team end up winning and she goes back to the girls hockey team by the end of the episode.
56	4	"Remember When"	November 26, 2003
A blow to the head from a hockey puck makes Alden think that he and Sharon are still dating. Sharon and her friends play along until he comes to his senses, but Alden's present girlfriend, Marlo, steps in and reminds Sharon that things won't stay this way and Alden's memory is gonna come back.
57	5	"Funny Business"	December 3, 2003
Dion helps Sharon get a job as a clown to pay for ballet lessons, but soon discovers that she's better at being a buffoon than pirouetting.
58	6	"Busted"	December 10, 2003
Sick of being mistaken for a little girl, Sharon buys a pump bra so people can finally see her as a woman. However, Sharon runs into trouble when the bra malfunctions during a party and it appears as though her breasts are growing out of control. Note: This episode was banned from later airings on some networks due to its content and plot about bras and breasts.
59	7	"The Beat Goes On"	December 17, 2003
Sharon performs at a poetry slam, but her moment in the sun is soon eclipsed by her brother, Adam, who isn't as poetic as his sister. Meanwhile, Sharon's mother is addicted to a video game.
60	8	"Game, Set-up and Match"	January 7, 2004
Sharon plays matchmaker for Dion, who she thinks is lonely and in need of a boyfriend, but Dion gives Sharon a lesson in interfering with other people's problems.
61	9	"While You Were Sleeping"	January 14, 2004
Sharon takes over for managing their garage band, Mangled Metal, while Maria gets some much needed rest, but Sharon is soon the stressed one as she juggles arrangements for Mangled Metal's performance while babysitting David's children.
62	10	"Identity Crisis"	January 21, 2004
A quirky, substitute student-teacher helps Sharon get in touch with her inner free spirit, which soon annoys her friends and family.
63	11	"Knight to Remember"	January 28, 2004
When Sharon's prom date stands her up, it's Sharon's father's girlfriend Lauren, to the rescue, who arranges Sharon to date a male pop singer named Taylor Knight.
64	12	"Just Quacks"	February 4, 2004
Sharon helps her brother Adam get in good with Hannah's father, who is the head of a duck conservation organization and Sharon is angry when she out that Mr Corbett lied to her. Meanwhile, Brock and Maria barely see each other because of their activities. Thy get into an argument after both of them can't decide what sport they wanna do since Maria booked them up for rock climbing and Brock booked them for golfing. But by the end of the episode, Brock meets with Sharon at the park and both of them decide not to do golfing or rock climbing, leading them both to kiss, much to Sharon's delight
65	13	"Griffin's Girl"	February 11, 2004
Sharon's potential step brother, Griffin (from "Up in Smoke"), is back—and much better-behaved, all thanks to his new girlfriend. Unfortunately, that "new girlfriend" is Sharon's nemesis, Nina.
66	14	"Poor Richard"	March 3, 2004
Sharon is mortified when she finds out her father is returning to the music business—as a wandering minstrel at a medieval-themed restaurant. Meanwhile, Connor distances himself from Alyson after he gets an embarrassing after-school job.
67	15	"My Big Fat Braceface Life"	March 10, 2004
In this clip show episode, Sharon regales her highs and lows as a braces-wearer to a girl named Tracy, who is worried that she may end up a "metal-mouth" just like Sharon.
68	16	"Clean Slate"	March 21, 2004
When Nina's cousin from England, Petra, truly admits that she decapitated all of Nina's dolls as a child, Nina realizes that she was mean to Sharon all these years for nothing and decides to end the hostilities once and for all, which Sharon reluctantly accepts, but being Nina's friend isn't at all what she expected. Meanwhile, Maria tries to scare Brock after he scares her with the zombie hand in the beginning of the episode, but fails. This time, Brock finally gets scared when Sharon shows up with her hair messed up and mud on her face, making Maria succeed.
69	17	"The Loooong Weekend"	April 19, 2004
Sharon finds herself invited on a cabin trip with Alden, Alden's sisters, Daisy and Violet, Alden's girlfriend Marlo, Maria, and Brock, where Alden and Marlo have relationship issues to work out.
70	18	"Act Your Age"	April 21, 2004
Sharon tries to find a mature young man—and gets one in the form of a twelve-year-old named Pablo.
71	19	"A Dog's Life"	April 28, 2004
Sharon's pet dog, Pigger, is chosen to be a spokes-canine for a dog food commercial.
72	20	"The Domino Effect"	May 12, 2004
In an effort to raise money for a charity drive, Sharon uses Connor's anniversary gift to Alyson (a dominos display) to raise money, but finds that the gift wasn't meant to be seen by anyone but Alyson.
73	21	"The Father Factor"	May 19, 2004
Sharon uses her mother's boyfriend, David, as a "surrogate father" (after Sharon's real father enlists Nina as his "surrogate daughter") on a TV game show where fathers and daughters compete.
74	22	"All About Sharon"	June 16, 2004
A new girl named Winnie encourages Sharon to audition for a summer job at a pioneer theme park, but Sharon's friends are worried that Winnie is encouraging Sharon for all the wrong reasons. Meanwhile, Adam tries to get rid of the mouse in the house.
75	23	"23's a Crowd"	August 11, 2004
Sharon befriends a cat lady named Miranda after tracking down her pet cat, Moishe, and tries to save her from being indicted by Animal Control for keeping too many animals in her house.
76	24	"Lights! Camera! Ego!"	August 18, 2004
Sharon and her friends prep a video for their band, Mangled Metal, to submit to TV3's latest contest, but creative differences may (once again) drive Sharon, Alden, Maria, Brock, Alyson, and Connor apart as friends and it drives them into an argument.
77	25	"Vegging Out"	August 25, 2004
After being diagnosed with anemia and told to give up her vegetarian diet, Sharon befriends a guy named Cody, who tries to show her that eating meat isn't as bad as she thinks; but how far is he willing to go to prove his point? Meanwhile, Alden shows signs of jealousy towards Sharon's relationship with Cody.
78	26	"Leap of Faith"	September 1, 2004
Sharon, Maria, Brock, and Alden go to Enviro-Camp, where Alden realizes that he still likes Sharon, but discovers it may be too late when Sharon falls for a counselor named Alex. Meanwhile, Maria is suspicious about Brock keeping secrets from her and she tries to find out. Once Sharon goes to the romantic rock, Alden follows her and Brock tells Maria that Alden was in love with Sharon again and Alden had been trying to get her to notice. When Alden meets Sharon at the top, he explains that he was the one who gave her the flowers and the sweater, not Alex and he wanted them to be a couple again. Before Sharon can say anything, she falls down the water and Alden jumps in to save her. Sharon forgives Alden and the two are now a couple again. Sharon then asks Maria what happen to Alex since he missed yoga this morning. And It is revealed that Brock had tied up Alex's tent from interrupting Sharon and Alden's moment. Brock's middle name is later revealed to be Shelby.
