= Devon Anderson =

English actor (born 1987)

- Born: Devon Carlo Anderson; 25 August 1987 (age 38); Greenwich, London, England
- Occupations: Actor, presenter
- Years active: 1993–present

Devon Carlo Anderson (born 25 August 1987) is an English actor. Anderson's roles include Billie Jackson in EastEnders and Sonny Valentine in Hollyoaks.

== Early life ==
Anderson was born on 25 August 1987 in London.

== Acting career ==
Anderson made his acting debut when he played three-year-old Glenn in Thirty Two Short Films About Glenn Gould. He then went on to appear in the BBC soap EastEnders where he played the character Billie Jackson from 1993 to 1997. He made an appearance in the 1997 film Spiceworld as one of the competition winners that falls into the river during a video shoot. He then played David in the television drama, The Greatest Store in the World. In 2002, he appeared in the children's comedy film Thunderpants playing the character of Dan. His next role was in 2002's CBBC programme Ace Lightning where he played Pete, the British friend of the main character, Mark. The character appeared in internet talks with Mark at the start of the programme and sometimes at the end.

In 2003, Anderson starred as the lead character in the CBBC sitcom Kerching!, Taj Lewis, an Internet whizzkid who was trying to make a million pounds for his widowed mother. In 2006, he won the role of Sonny Valentine in the Channel 4 soap Hollyoaks, but his contract was terminated by the show's producer Bryan Kirkwood on 6 January 2007. He has also made an appearance on the television show TMi, and appeared on Doctors on 15 May 2008.

In summer 2009, Anderson starred as Kian Oduya in the online drama Who Killed Summer sponsored by Vodafone which saw six young characters travelling Europe and the UK culminating in a murder mystery.

It was confirmed in November 2009 that Anderson would reprise the role of Billie Jackson in EastEnders, 15 years after he was last seen on the soap. He remained in the soap until October 2010 when Anderson was sacked, once again, by Bryan Kirkwood, who was the EastEnders producer at the time, and his character Billie was killed off.

In 2012, he was in a production at the Riverside Studios, Hammersmith called 'Concrete Jungle'. He also starred as Sinbad's brother, Jamil, in BBC's series "Sinbad" for one series, July–September, 2012.

Anderson appeared in one episode of Casualty in December 2018 as homeless man Robby Watts.

== Presenting career ==
Following his role in Kerching!, Anderson became a CBBC presenter. He presented on both the BBC1 CBBC show and the CBBC Channel.
