= Tamara Bernier Evans =

Canadian actress (born 1974)

- Born: Tamara Michele Bernier; June 6, 1974 (age 52); North Bay, Ontario, Canada
- Occupations: Actress; musician; producer; director
- Spouse: Richard Evans (m. 2003)
- Children: 2

Tamara Bernier Evans (born Tamara Michele Bernier; June 6, 1974) is a Canadian actress, musician, producer and director.

== Early life ==
She was raised in North Bay, Ontario, by teachers Joanne Scott and Raymond Bernier. Her sister, Trista Bernier Grant, was a professional athlete who won a bronze medal for pole-vaulting at The Commonwealth Games in 1998. She obtained a BFA in acting at York University in Toronto, Ontario.

== Career ==
Evans began her career by earning a coveted spot in The Stratford Shakespeare Festival's Young Company where she spent four years playing such roles as Celia and Audrey in As You Like It, Sylvia in The Two Gentlemen of Verona, and Dunyasha in The Cherry Orchard.

In Toronto, she worked with the Necessary Angel, Canadian Stage Company, Tarragon Theatre and Nightwood Theatre companies developing and premiering new plays including Seven Lears by Howard Barker, It's All True by Jason Sherman, Outrageous! by Brad Fraser and Anything That Moves by Ann-Marie MacDonald. In Ottawa, she performed at The National Arts Centre in the world premiere of Allen Cole's jazz opera The Wrong Son.

In 2000 she won the role of Tanya in the Toronto stage production of Mamma Mia!. After performing the role for two years at The Royal Alexandra Theatre, she was asked to join the Broadway company at the Winter Garden Theatre in New York City. She also performed the same role at Mandalay Bay in Las Vegas.

She played the role of Rose Narracott in Mirvish's 2012 Toronto Production of War Horse.

=== Television and film ===
Her television credits include Republic of Doyle (CBC), Flashpoint (CTV), The Border (CBC), Kung Fu The Legend Continues (Warner Bros) as well as many recurring voice roles on animated series including Mystique in Wolverine and the X-Men, Helen Spitz in Braceface, and Lady Illusion in Ace Lightning.

She has worked on the feature films The Break-Up, The Invasion, Catch and Release and St. Roz, among others.

Evans is a co-founder and co-owner of Awen Entertainment, a TV and film production company she started with Gregory Sheppard, set up to nurture Canadian television writers and their projects in order to attract international co-production.

=== Writing and directing ===
As a playwright, her musical Beholden was produced at Theatre Calgary's Fuse series in 2009.

Evans became the Assistant Artistic Director at Tarragon Theatre in Toronto in August 2015.

She directed 'Midsummer, a play with songs', at Tarragon in April, 2017.

=== Music ===
Evans produced her first album of original music entitled Brand New Remedy in 2000.

== Personal life ==
Evans married composer and pianist Richard Evans in Toronto, Ontario, Canada. They have two children, Meredith and Owen.
