= List of Gunsmith Cats characters =

Gunsmith Cats is a Japanese manga series written and illustrated by Kenichi Sonoda. It was published in Kodansha's seinen manga magazine Monthly Afternoon from December 1990 to April 1997. It was followed by a sequel series, titled Gunsmith Cats Burst (stylized in all caps), published in Monthly Afternoon from July 2004 to September 2008 and including the same characters and situations.

The series describes the adventures of young women fighting crime in Chicago and across the Midwestern United States.

== Main characters ==
=== Rally Vincent ===
Irene "Rally" Vincent (アイリーン・ラリー・ビンセント, Airīn Rarī Binsento) is a gunshop owner by trade, Rally dabbles in bounty hunting to pay the bills. Her father was an Olympic-level marksman who taught Rally about firearms while running a gun store called Gunsmith Cat in Chicago. Her mother, who had wanted Rally to be a violinist, opposed everything to do with guns and eventually was murdered at the store by robbers when trying to file divorce papers on her husband. After her father disappeared to search for her mother's murderers, Rally took over the store as her own venture, and recruited Minnie May as an assistant. Upon making May a partner, the shop became known as "Gunsmith Cats".

A bit reserved when it comes to men, Rally feels most comfortable when discussing firearms. Although her age is 19, her records state that she is 21, the legal age to operate gun shops in Chicago. Her weapon of choice is a first version CZ-75 and she also carries a concealed pistol. Rally drives a blue 1967 model Shelby Mustang Cobra GT500 with white racing stripes, which she cherishes until its destruction in Gunsmith Cats Burst, when it is replaced by a heavily modified Mustang II Cobra. When quarreling with Rally, Minnie May implied that guns and cars were sex substitutes for the virginal Rally; there is arguably an erotic undertone to her fondness for guns and cars.

Rally's father is Indian and her mother was English. As a result, she has dark blue eyes, dusky skin, and dark hair. She is highly skilled in hand-to-hand combat, with great speed and physical agility, and is an expert but reckless driver. Although she does not always respect the letter of the law, she has a strong moral sense of right and wrong and is reluctant to kill unless absolutely necessary. An excellent marksman, she often targets her opponents' trigger fingers or crucial components of their guns in combat rather than going for a lethal shot. As a result, she has sometimes been hunted by criminals angry at their mutilation at her hands.

Rally also usually carries a .25 DuO (made by the same company as the CZ-75) with the trigger guard removed, mounted on a spring-loaded frame strapped to her arm for quick access in a tight spot. When her CZ-75 has been unavailable, she relies on a SIG P210, another very high quality weapon, and sometimes carries a back-up gun in an ankle holster. She keeps a precision rifle and shotgun in the trunk of her Shelby; these have included a Walther WA 2000 and a SIG 550 Sniper variant. Her first gun, given to her by her father, was an AR-7, a small .22 LR rifle that can be disassembled and the components stored inside the buttstock; she uses this from time to time. Other guns Rally owns and cherishes are a 1960 Colt .25 pocket model, a Beretta 84F, a Walther P38, a Parabellum P'08 (Luger), a Colt Lawman Mk.3 and a Browning Hi-Power. She has occasionally used other weapons, including a Glock 19 and an RG14 "Saturday night special" revolver when she was completely devoid of other weapons, and she is an expert shot with any firearm she has been shown using.

While Irene is her actual name, she chose the alias "Rally (or rather, Larry)" as a pseudonym and cover name to not clarify her gender and demoralize her clients. It was not clear from the Japanese whether Rally's name is intended to be "Irene" or "Eileen" but the official English translation uses Irene. In several European editions of the manga, most notably in the Italian one, it is "Aileen". Since L's and R's are mostly interchangeable in Japanese to English translations, the main character's name is often translated as Rally Vincent, and this has become the standard. However, at the 1993 Anime America convention Kenichi Sonoda, when asked a question about the character, started his answer with "It's Larry, not Rally." This is further backed up in the manga where in one scene she is receiving a fax from Becky (about Riff-Raff), and the note scrawled on it addresses her as Larry.

By the end of the series, as her team members and friends head off towards lighter ventures and greener pastures, Rally herself retires from Chicago's underworld and the bounty hunting scene, moving on with her life, yet still honing her marksmanship.

Voiced by: Michiko Neya (Japanese); Amanda Winn-Lee (English)

=== Minnie May ===
"Minnie" May Hopkins (ミニー・メイ・ホプキンズ, Minī Mei Hopukinzu) is a self-styled "bomb specialist", May learned the trade from her boyfriend, Ken Takizawa. While only 17, her age was raised to 18 in the original English release since she is depicted performing explicit sexual acts; it was changed back in the Dark Horse revised edition.

May ran away from home at 13 for undisclosed reasons and was found by Ken. When Ken had to go underground for several years, she worked as a child prostitute at a brothel in Chinatown — even advancing into teaching other newcomers — before leaving and joining up with Rally to run the gun shop. Her time in the brothel is still a very touchy subject for her, though, and she prefers not to bring it up again, though she is quite proud of the skills she acquired there.

When action is called for, May carries a wide range of explosive weapons with her. She typically uses a self-modified grenade called a "May Special," a grenade with no materials to cause shrapnel. Perhaps even more impressive is her talent for disguises and acting; she has fooled Ken into thinking she was a boy for several months, blushed and wept on command, imitated the police chief's voice on the phone so well she fools one of his officers, and impersonated a child actress well enough to fool an entire film crew. Drives a Fiat 500 across both manga series.

May is tiny and young-appearing for her age, having taken growth-stunting herbal drugs in an effort to stay attractive to Ken (this plot element was modified in the English translation to a condition that she is taking drugs in an attempt to correct). She can pass for a child of ten or twelve and often takes advantage of this. She is very cute — "like Minnie Mouse," hence her nickname — with blonde hair and blue-green eyes.

May is generally cheerful and possesses a great "joie de vivre." She does have a temper, though, particularly if someone comes down hard on her lover and mentor Ken Takizawa, or if it is suggested that she may not be mature enough to handle a particular assignment.

By the end of Gunsmith Cats, May and Ken, married, settle down in a better part of Chicago, with their ties to the world of crime severed, and eventually have a son.

Voiced by: Kae Araki (Japanese); Kimberly Yates (English)

=== Bean Bandit ===
Bean bandit is a tall, scar-faced tough-as-nails driver for hire known for his invulnerability. He is typically depicted wearing a steel-padded Kevlar-lined leather jacket, blue jeans and an armored headband. According to sources found in the Riding Bean OAV, his boots, jeans and shirts are all laminated with Kevlar, while his signature jacket is titanium mesh with Kevlar-laminated leather. According to the manga, the jacket is actually a combination of Moose Leather, chain-mail and ceramic plates.

Overall, he is an even better driver than Rally, capable of stunt-driver-level feats. He prefers American muscle cars of the 1970s and Fords in particular; a couple of his personal favorites being a modified 1970 Boss 302 Mustang and a supercharged 1971 Mach 1. However, he owns a whole garage full of famous muscle-car models and is often seen driving a 1968 Chevrolet Corvette C3 fitted with an ultra-rare LS-7.

Despite his impressive collection, he has further aspirations: in his signature story arc, he tells Rally about his desire to build his own car, "from the chassis on up", an original, designed to his specifications. At the time he had already paid a designer over three hundred thousand dollars, and it debuts in the eighth story arc. He dubs this monstrous gas-guzzler the 'Buff' (as in African Cape Buffalo). It is a blueprinted, supercharged 427 cubic-inch displacement engine(dyno'd at 500 BHP), with not only armor plating and bulletproof glass, but a reinforced frame, specifically designed to be bulletproof from the ground up-all but indestructible. It can drive sideways and has special air brakes and wheel spikes to aid in sudden stops. The Buff is very similar in design to the Ford RS200, a Group B rally car made in the 1980s. Considering Bean's preference for Fords throughout the series, the design similarities are very likely to be deliberate.

Bean insists on following his strict rules of engagement in all circumstances, and sticks to his word (and he expects his business partners to do the same). Although he doesn't shy away from violence, he prefers to remain neutral when he can and collect his hefty driving fees for almost any kind of job. He will work for criminals and legitimate interests alike as long as he is paid as agreed, although after a competition against Rally about a Kerasine delivery (see Goldie's entry) he has agreed not to deliver any more drugs. He will charge hefty penalties to employers who break his terms; his only Achilles heel is a protective instinct towards children and noncombatants.

Bean is huge and muscular, towering over most people. He can perform amazing feats of strength (like ripping the door off a car with one hand) and shrug off most injuries. Even a pistol shot to his armored headband will barely slow him down. He prefers knives to guns, and can throw a knife straight through a car windscreen with deadly accuracy. He has long black hair, darkish skin and brown eyes, and his race is not determined. However, in interviews, Sonoda has implied that Bean's amazing traits are a result of him being a mix of the strongest characteristics from many different races.

Bean Bandit is also the star of a 1989 original video animation and manga, written by Sonoda, called Riding Bean. In this separate story, Bean and a blonde Rally are partners and have a close, but professional, friendship.

At the end of Gunsmith Cats, his recent scuffle with Percy Bacharach, an aggressive and otherwise reckless officer with a long history with Bean, has him leaving the Chicago scene for a while, although he still keeps offering his services outside of the state of Illinois.

Voiced by: Hideyuki Tanaka (Japanese); J. Patrick Lawlor (English)

=== Becky Farrah ===
"Becky the Nose" is Rally's main source of information on all the goings on in the Chicago underworld. While her fees are high and she can come across as money-grubbing, most if not all of her information is legitimate; she is also known for working in finding missing people. When she is not chasing after Rally for her payment, the two share a friendship that crosses business lines. Becky eventually withdraws from the Chicago underworld in the end and uses her scouting skills in investment and business, although her friends remind her when it borders on insider trading.

Becky wears glasses with a ponytail and is usually businesslike in appearance. She can be seen driving a BMW 2002 Turbo. Bought a BMW 3 Series Compact in Gunsmith Cats Burst after selling the 2002 to Misty.

Voiced by: Aya Hisakawa (Japanese); Tiffany Grant (English)

=== Ken Takizawa ===
A Japanese-American explosives expert by trade, he learned his craft through a combination of his connections to the Chicago underworld and on the set of Hollywood movies. He then taught Minnie May everything he knows. He and Minnie began a sexual relationship when she was 13 and he was about 30 years old. He also has multiple sclerosis, which affects his ability to handle sensitive explosives.

At the end of the series, he and May open up an anime and Japanese hobby store in Chicago after their honeymoon to Osaka, and have a son.

As a personal joke, he uses the nickname "Ken Taki", which is similar to the Japanese pronunciation of the state Kentucky as well as the fast food franchise, "kentakkī".

=== Misty Brown ===
An expert sneak thief and burglar, she is caught by Rally and Minnie-May but joins them upon her subsequent release from jail. Like May, she moves into Rally's house and helps both in the shop and in the pursuit of fugitives, where her lock-picking skills prove useful. Misty doesn't carry any guns but is quite adept in the use of knives, wielded and thrown. She is a lesbian and has a crush on Rally, although later on she becomes Goldie's lover. Drives Becky's BMW 2002 Turbo after it was sold to her cheaply by Becky in Gunsmith Burst.

=== Roy Coleman ===
A detective of the Chicago Police, Roy is Rally's main contact with the force. Acting as more of an older brother at times, he watches out for Rally when she's in trouble. While considerably older than Rally, he still enjoys spending time with her, as it gives him a sense of belonging to the younger generation, and a contact of his own in the same generation.

Initially drive a Volkswagen Beetle but totalled it and changed to a Volkswagen Golf Mk 1 before changing again to a red Ford Sierra XR4i.

At the end of the series, not content with workings of the Chicago Police Department after Percy Bacharach's recent attempt to capture Bean Bandit and violations of protocol, Roy transfers out to the Rosemount department.

Voiced by: Ikuya Sawaki (Japanese); Guil Lunde (English)

=== Riff-Raff ===
A wild female courier driver, much like Bean Bandit. While working on the wrong side of the law, she has deep within herself a sense of honor which does not let her betray anyone she has taken sympathy to, and becomes allies of Bandit, Rally and company. Her greatest dream is to become the best courier driver and outdo Bean himself. She was extremely proud of her driving skills and once belted Bean in the jaw after he had made a joke about her car being an automatic. She could be seen driving an AC Cobra 427, and because of her skill with it, she has adopted the name "Snake Charmer".

Her appearance was modeled after the character Luffy from the anime series Gall Force, to which Kenichi Sonoda also provided the character designs while he worked for ARTMIC.

== Antagonists ==
In Gunsmith Cats, Chicago has many large-scale criminals and outlaws, each crossing paths with Rally & company over the course of the series.

=== Bonnie and Clyde ===
A fictional take on a factual pair, Bonnie and Clyde Dorman are a brother-sister pair of hired guns: Bonnie operates in Chicago, while Clyde runs with an outfit in Mexico. Bonnie's first encounter with Rally costs both of her legs and her right thumb; after Clyde facilitates her escape from jail, Bonnie takes to wearing specially designed prosthetic limbs with weapons inside them, and becomes obsessed with evening the score. Together Bonnie and Clyde hatch a scheme to steal from the local drug cartels, get revenge on Rally, then sneak out of town and retire. They are nearly successful, but are slain in a brief and chaotic firefight.

=== Gray ===
A drug lord and gang leader, Gray runs a large cocaine distribution ring in Chicago. During a fateful encounter with Rally, she relieved him of one of his hands by means of a shotgun; henceforth, he sports a prosthetic hook hand. He is eventually caught and imprisoned, though he continues to run his drug ring from his cell. Through his many connections, he is eventually released and swears vengeance on Rally (and is eventually killed in his pursuit, right after confessing his love for Rally).

=== Jones ===
A small-time drug dealer, first seen with his driver, Riff-Raff.

=== Borgnine ===
A mysterious figure involved in the 'Kidnapped' story arc. In order to draft stage magician and hypnotist Mr. Smart as an accomplice in a heist, Borgnine seduces Smart's estranged wife and fits his daughter Jeena with an explosive collar, which can be detonated via cell phone anytime. Rally is hired by Jeena's friends to rescue Jeena and save Mr. Smart's reputation. Borgnine proves to be a dangerous adversary, but his greed and treachery eventually lead to his demise.

=== Goldie Musou ===
Arguably the most ruthless of Rally's opponents. Of Italian ancestry, "Iron Goldie" is a high-ranking member of a mob family in Sicily. Many call her a Mafia Queen. She is an incredible hand-to-hand combatant, and is quite skilled at creating complex plans, which, though often successful, often make plain her cavalier attitude towards her subordinates.

She is a pathological personality, the textbook definition of a "control freak." She is obsessed with controlling everything and everyone around her. People who resist her successfully, such as Rally, become even more attractive to her. She is a lesbian, though she tends to express it as a form of sadistic pedophilia. She keeps a trademark harem of young girls who have murdered their parents while under the influence of her drugs. Goldie and Rally crossed paths many times, and the bounty hunter is usually quite lucky to escape with her life and the lives of her friends. However, this is far better than any of Goldie's previous opponents have done, and repeated escapes quickly turn the mobster's appreciation for her skills into a dedicated sexual obsession. Finally, Goldie decides that she will make Rally her masterpiece - a slave broken to her will through sheer psychological torture, without the aid of drugs.

The linchpin of her power base is psychopharmacology, or the use of hallucinogenic drugs similar to LSD. With a valedictorian in pharmaceuticals, over the years she has developed an effective method of mind control. The first thing she does after she gains chemical control of someone she considers a worthy "pet" is order him or her to kill his or her loved ones. The alternative to the chemically induced fantasy world she had built for her puppets is a reality where they have murdered everyone who cared for them. She has yet to lose control of a subject whom she has completely enslaved.

Her current empire is based on a powerful designer drug called Kerasine, which is also a major plot device of the series. It is a compound that she knows how to produce cheaply but has yet to be reverse-engineered by chemists outside of her organization. Its popularity is due to both its low cost and its ability to produce the effects of several different drugs: a small amount is a stimulant like cocaine, a larger amount is a euphoric similar to heroin, and the entire contents of a vial combines both with a powerful hallucinogenic effect similar to lysergic acid diethylamide.

All this comes with a nasty side effect - a user of the drug can be given hypnotic commands while he or she is under its influence. Currently, it is the most popular drug in the world of the manga. Several storylines detail Rally's efforts to prevent Goldie from flooding Chicago with this mind-bending substance, including one which involves using Rally's father, through Kerasine inducement, in which he becomes Goldie's personal assassin.

However, despite her malicious actions and otherwise antagonistic qualities, Goldie's plans and desires were often intentioned for means other than a lust for power and dominance over the criminal underworld out of spiteful reasons. By the end of Gunsmith Cats, it was revealed that Kerasine was created as a designer drug that would be addictive yet without negative side effects, allowing for a drug that would not harm consumers and thus, higher profits, and through her influence, that she would use that to establish an honorable and stable order of criminal activity and "necessary evil" in Chicago, wiping out gangs and syndicates with otherwise greedy or selfish intentions and dishonorable and disreputable reputations for breaking deals and cruel intrigues that were also affecting society in a worse way. After losing her memory in her final battle with Rally in the original series, she regains it after Rally and Misty get tangled up in a turf war between Goldie and the more hostile Mafia fractions, in which course Rally saves Goldie's life. In the end Goldie and Rally part on a truce, especially since Misty has (more or less voluntarily) joined Goldie as her lover.

== Anime ==
=== William "Bill" Collins ===
An agent in the Chicago office of the A.T.F., Bill Collins comes across as a sleazy, nosy government agent who fancies himself as Eliot Ness. He is investigating a gun-running operation, but has run into a lot of dead leads, as well as a few dead agents. Desperate for help, he 'enlists' Rally and May's help by holding up the gun shop's license as insurance.

Although they had success at first by shutting down a distribution point in Chicago, Jonathan Washington, the lone witness, along with five A.T.F. agents, are assassinated by in a safehouse by Natasha Radinov, using Collins' cardkey and access code to gain entry. Now the investigation is due to be closed and Collins soon discovers a conspiracy within the A.T.F., which involves his superior George Black and mayoral candidate Edward Haints who has Rally as a target.

Voiced by: Hōchū Ohtsuka (Japanese); Rob Mungle (English)

=== George Black ===
Collins' superior in the A.T.F. Chicago office, George Black is revealed to be part of a gun-running operation which he co-ran with Edward Haints, an Illinois assemblyman running for mayor in Chicago under a gun-control platform. It was Black who contracts Natasha Radinov to kill Jonathan Washington, the only witness to the operation, for which he provided her with a cardkey with Collins' ID, as well as Rally and May for helping Collins. He also supplies Radinov with the use of a supposedly shut-down A.T.F. safehouse for her to stay in.

But after the first attempt to kill Rally fails, Black files a vacation leave and decides to flee the country. He goes to the safehouse where he knows Radinov is, but soon discovers that his partner Haints was talking to Radinov on the phone, with Radinov aiming her pistol at him. Realizing he has been double-crossed, he tries to persuade Radinov to tell Haints not to kill him, but to no avail. Radinov kills him.

Voiced by: Michihiro Ikemizu (Japanese); Rick Peeples (English)

=== Natasha Radinov ===
Also known as "Bloody Pierce", Natasha Radinov is initially an agent for the K.G.B. and Spetsnaz, but after the fall of the Soviet Union, she contracts her services out as a freelance assassin. She is proficient in almost every deadly hand weapon in the world, but prefers to work with silent weapons, especially a Welrod silenced pistol and a ballistic knife designed for Spetsnaz use. She also wears a long coat lined with ballistic nylon and Kevlar, the inside lining holding a vast arsenal of weapons.

Radinov prefers to be paid for her services in heroin, which she sells in Russia; she personally stays away from the drug herself. Recently, she had accepted an assignment to kill Rally and May because the two had interfered in a gun-running operation run by Edward Haints, an Illinois assemblyman running for mayor under a gun-control platform. However, when the first attempt fails, and Radinov is injured because of it, she takes it as "a matter of pride" and went after Rally personally. After a violent chase, Radinov is killed by Rally thanks to several shots to the chest at close range.

Voiced by: Yōko Sōmi (Japanese); Marcy Rae (English)

=== Edward Haints ===
A senator in the Illinois General Assembly, Edward Haints is running for mayor of Chicago. His campaign style has him wrapping himself in an "All American" theme, which favors heavily on protecting the city's citizens by instituting stricter gun-access laws.

In truth, Haints runs one of the biggest gun-running operations in the state, and the strict gun laws he plans to enact will enable him to raise the prices of his own illicit operations. When Bill Collins gets a little too close with his investigations, he asks his friend and partner George Black to hire Natasha Radinov to kill the witnesses and derail the investigation. However, Haints also hires Radinov to kill Black as well, mostly to keep the profits of his gun-running to himself.

However, Roy Coleman's partner disguises herself as Radinov and has Becky Farrah videotape a meeting between her and Haints, exposing Haints' plot.

Voiced by: Seizō Katō (Japanese); Aaron Krohn (English)

=== Jonathan Washington ===
At the beginning of the series, Jonathan Washington had skipped bail for drug smuggling charges, only to be captured by Rally Vincent. In truth, Washington has been working for Edward Haints' gun-running ring and operates an entire warehouse filled with illicit firearms... firearms that Rally, with a little "help" from Bill Collins, were able to prevent hitting the streets.

However, since Washington is a vital witness to the gun ring, he is taken to an A.T.F. safehouse outside Chicago. He tries to persuade Rally to help him escape the safehouse because he now fears for his life. He knows that George Black, the head of the A.T.F.'s Chicago office, is also a partner of Haints and has now dispatched an assassin to kill him. When Rally refuses to help him escape, he leaves a fake Rolex watch and a scrap of paper with the address of his "daughter" on it with May. In fact, the paper holds an Internet address and the watch has an access code to the shipping dates of the gun ring engraved on the back of the watchband's latch.

True to his warning, Washington does meet his demise when Natasha Radinov, using a copy of Collins' cardkey and access code, enters the safehouse, and kills Washington and the A.T.F agents guarding him.

Voiced by: Daisuke Gōri (Japanese); Brett Weaver (English)
