= List of Naruto media =

- Created by: Masashi Kishimoto
- Original work: Naruto manga

Print publications
- Book(s): 72 tankōbon volumes 10 databooks 3 artbooks 3 anime profiles
- Novel(s): 26 novels

Films and television
- Film(s): 11 films
- Short film(s): 12 shorts
- Animated series: 2 main series 2 spin-offs

Official website
- naruto.com

Naruto (Note: Japanese: NARUTO(ナルト)) is a Japanese manga series written and illustrated by Masashi Kishimoto and published by Shueisha in Weekly Shōnen Jump. It tells the story of Naruto Uzumaki, an adolescent ninja who searches constantly for recognition and dreams of becoming the Hokage, the ninja in his village who is acknowledged as the leader and the strongest of all. The manga made its debut on September 21, 1999, and it concluded on November 10, 2014. A total of 72 volumes and 700 chapters were released. The books published in Japan by Shueisha under various imprints were adapted or expanded upon the Naruto manga and anime series. Several of the titles have been licensed for publication in North America by Viz Media. The first part of the anime was released on October 10, 2002, and it concluded on February 8, 2007, with a total of 220 episodes. The second part of the anime was released on February 15, 2007, and it concluded on March 23, 2017, with a total of 500 episodes. Aside from that, there has been other material released based on the series, such as anime comics, light novels, artbooks, supplemental guidebooks, original video animation (OVAs), and movies.

== Original series ==
=== Manga ===
Title	Run	Creator	Publisher	Volumes	Chapters	Schedule	Ref.
Naruto	1999 – 2014	Masashi Kishimoto	Weekly Shonen Jump	72	700	Weekly	

=== Anime ===
Title	Run	Original network	Production	Seasons	Episodes
Naruto	2002 – 2007	TXN (TV Tokyo)	Pierrot	9	220
Naruto: Shippuden	2007 – 2017	TXN (TV Tokyo)	Pierrot	22	500

== Spin-off series ==
=== Manga ===
No.	Title	Original release date	English release date
1	Naruto: The Seventh Hokage and the Scarlet Spring; Naruto Gaiden: Nanadaime Hokage to Akairo no Hanatsuzuki (NARUTO−ナルト−外伝 ～七代目火影と緋色の花つ月～)	August 4, 2015; 978-4-08-880468-2	January 5, 2016; 978-1-4215-8493-5
The manga is a limited run spin-off sequel to Naruto written by Masashi Kishimoto, which was serialized in Shueisha's Weekly Shōnen Jump from April 27, 2015 to July 6, 2015. Set shortly after the final chapter of Naruto, the miniseries focuses primarily on Sarada Uchiha, the daughter of Sasuke and Sakura, who accompanies Naruto on a mission as she seeks to learn about her parents while combating a mysterious antagonist with ties to Orochimaru and the Uchiha clan. The story acts as a prelude to the 11th Naruto film, Boruto: Naruto the Movie. The collected tankōbon volume was released on August 4, 2015, in Japan. The story takes place 15 years after the Fourth Shinobi World War, with Sarada trying to find out the truth behind her suspicions.
2	Naruto: The Path Lit by the Full Moon; Naruto Gaiden: Michita Tsuki ga Terasu Michi (NARUTO−ナルト−外伝 ～満ちた月が照らす道～)	—	—
The manga is a one-shot spin-off written and illustrated by Masashi Kishimoto, which was published in Weekly Shōnen Jump on April 25, 2016. The one-shot acts as a prelude to the Boruto series and focuses on Mitsuki, Orochimaru's progeny and the third member of Boruto Uzumaki and Sarada's team, as he comes to grips with his origins and identity. The one-shot was included in the first volume of Boruto: Naruto Next Generations.
3	Boruto: Naruto Next Generations; BORUTO−ボルト− −NARUTO NEXT GENERATIONS−	May 9, 2016	May 9, 2016
The manga is a spin-off sequel illustrated by Mikio Ikemoto and written by Ukyō Kodachi with supervision from series creator Masashi Kishimoto, which was published in Weekly Shōnen Jump on May 9, 2016. It focuses on the story of Naruto's son, Boruto, fulfilling a ninja carrier and following his own ninja way as he gets older. Ikemoto was Kishimoto's chief assistant on the original Naruto series, and Kodachi was his writing partner for the Boruto: Naruto the Movie film screenplay.
4	Boruto: Two Blue Vortex; Boruto: Tsū Burī Bōtekusu (ボルト -2 BLUE VORTEX-)	August 21, 2023	August 21, 2023
The manga is the continuation and Part 2 of the Boruto: Naruto Next Generations series, illustrated by Mikio Ikemoto and written by Masashi Kishimoto. Set a few years after a major status-quo shift involving Boruto and Kawaki, the series began serialization in V Jump on August 21, 2023, following a brief hiatus after Part 1 concluded.
5	Naruto: The Whorl Within the Spiral; Naruto Gaiden: Senpū no Uzu (NARUTO-ナルト- 外伝 〜旋風の渦〜)	July 18, 2023	July 18, 2023
A special one-shot manga written and illustrated by series creator Masashi Kishimoto, published in Weekly Shōnen Jump on July 18, 2023. Created as a celebration for winning the worldwide "NARUTO99" character popularity poll, the one-shot explores the backstory of Minato Namikaze (the Fourth Hokage) and the development of his signature jutsu, the Rasengan, alongside Kushina Uzumaki.
6	Naruto: Sasuke's Story - The Uchiha and the Heavenly Stardust; Naruto: Sasuke Retsuden - Uchiha no Matsuei to Tenkyū no Hoshikuzu (NARUTO -ナルト- サスケ烈伝 うちはの末裔と天球の星屑)	October 23, 2022	October 23, 2022
The manga is a spin-off based on the novel of the same name written by Jun Esaka. It is illustrated by Shingo Kimura and began serialization on the Shōnen Jump+ website and app on October 23, 2022.
7	Naruto: Konoha's Story—The Steam Ninja Scrolls: The Manga; Naruto: Konoha Shinden: Yukemuri Ninpōchō (NARUTO-ナルト- 木ノ葉新伝 湯煙忍法帖)	October 29, 2022	October 29, 2022
The manga is a spin-off based on the novel of the same name written by Shō Hinata. It is illustrated by Natsuo Sai and began serialization on the Shōnen Jump+ website and app on October 29, 2022.

=== Super deformed spin-offs ===
No.	Title	Original release date	English release date
1	Rock Lee's Springtime of Youth Full-Power Ninja Chronicles; Rock Lee no Seishun Full-Power Ninden (ロック・リーの青春フルパワー忍伝)	—	—
The manga is a SD comedy spin-off manga written and illustrated by Kenji Taira. The series chronicles the daily life and training of Konohagakure ninja Rock Lee and the humorous adventures he and his Team Guy teammates go through. It debuted in the January 2012 issue of Saikyō Jump and concluded in September 2014. The series was collected into seven tankōbon volumes and was also adapted into an anime, Rock Lee & His Ninja Pals, which aired from 2012 through 2013.
2	Naruto: Chibi Sasuke's Sharingan Legend (lit. "Uchiha Sasuke's Sharingan Chronicles"); Uchiha Sasuke no Sharingan-den (うちはサスケの写輪眼伝)	—	—
The manga is a SD comedy spin-off manga written and illustrated by Kenji Taira and the follow-up to Rock Lee no Seishun Full-Power Ninden. The series takes a humorous look at the adventures of Sasuke Uchiha and Taka cohorts. It debuted in the November 2014 issue of Saikyō Jump. Viz Media began publishing free chapters on the official English Weekly Shonen Jump website on June 28, 2016.
3	Boruto: Saikyō Dash Generations; Boruto: Saikyō Dash Sedai (ボルト -NARUTO NEXT GENERATIONS- 最強ダッシュ世代)	—	—
The manga is a SD comedy spin-off manga written and illustrated by Kenji Taira, following the conclusion of his previous spin-offs. The series features comical, super-deformed adventures starring Boruto Uzumaki and the new generation of ninja. It was serialized in Saikyō Jump starting in 2015.

=== Anime ===
No.	Title	Original release date	English release date
1	Rock Lee & His Ninja Pals	April 3, 2012	—
The anime series based on the Naruto spin-off manga created by Kenji Taira, Rock Lee no Seishun Full-Power Ninden. It was announced in February 2012 by Shueisha. Produced by Studio Pierrot and directed by Masahiko Murata, the series premiered on TV Tokyo on April 3, 2012. Crunchyroll simulcasted the series premiere online and has each episode available for streaming. The series chronicles the daily life and training of Konohagakure ninja Rock Lee, who can utilize taijutsu, but has no skill in ninjutsu or genjutsu. Episodes feature comical scenes and mini-skits to emphasize the characters' goals and thought processes. Rock Lee & His Ninja Pals is the first spin-off anime series that does not follow the main plot of the Naruto Shippuuden series, although it retains the original voice actors.
2	Boruto: Naruto Next Generations	April 5, 2017	April 5, 2017
The anime series based on the manga series of the same name and is a spin-off of and sequel to Masashi Kishimoto's Naruto. It is directed by Noriyuki Abe, Hiroyuki Yamashita (episodes #1-66), and Toshiro Fujii (episodes #67-) and is written by Makoto Uezu (episodes #1-66) and Masaya Honda (episodes #67-) Manga writer Ukyo Kodachi is supervising the series. Boruto follows the exploits of Naruto Uzumaki's son Boruto and his comrades from Konohagakure's ninja academy while finding a path to follow once they grow up. Despite being based on the manga, the anime explores exclusive storylines as well as adaptations of the spin-off manga Naruto: The Seventh Hokage and the Scarlet Spring, the film Boruto: Naruto the Movie, as well as the light novels Naruto Shinden.

== Anime comics ==
Various anime comics have been released in Japan under Shueisha's Jump Comics inprint, typically adapting the Naruto and Naruto Shippuden theatrical films, though adaptations of the first Naruto OVA and a sixth season Naruto Shippuden TV special were also produced. Viz Media licensed and published the anime comic adaptations of the three Naruto films in North America in October 2007 and November 2008.

=== Naruto ===
No.	Title	Original release date	English release date
	Naruto the Movie: Ninja Clash in the Land of Snow; Naruto: Daikatsugeki! Yukihime Ninpōchō Dattebayo!! (NARUTO―ナルト― 大活劇！ 雪姫忍法帖だってばよ！！)	December 3, 2004; 978-4-08-873727-0; ISBN 978-4-08-873728-7	October 15, 2007; 978-1-4215-1868-8
1. "The Fugitive Princess" (逃亡の姫君!!, "Tōbō no himegimi!!"); 2. "Snow Ninjas Appear" (雪忍襲来!!, "Yuki shinobi shūrai!!"); 3. "The Unbreakable Heart" (折れない心!!, "Orenai kokoro!!"); 4. "Don't Cry..." (泣かないで..., "Nakanaide..."); 5. "Yukie's Resolution" (雪絵の決意!!, "Yukie no ketsui!!"); 6. "The 7 Colored Desire" (七色の希望!!, "Nana-iro no kibō!!"); 7. "Spring -Epilogue-" (春 〜エピローグ〜, "Haru -EPIRŌGU-")
This ani-manga is based on the first Naruto film, Naruto the Movie: Ninja Clash in the Land of Snow, and was originally released in two parts in Japan. The two parts were collected in a single volume for the English-language release. After watching a film of his favorite character, Princess Fuun, Naruto Uzumaki is dispatched with his team members, Sasuke Uchiha, Sakura Haruno, and Kakashi Hatake, to the Land of Snow to protect the actors during the shooting of the new Princess Fuun film. However, the group is attacked by Yukigakure ninja. After the battle, the actor playing Princess Fuun is revealed to be Koyuki Kazahana, the daughter of the previous daimyō of the Land of Snow. Unwilling to accept her role as ruler, she attempts to run away but is found by Naruto, who encourages her to keep on trying, no matter the odds. The Yukigakure ninja are eventually revealed to be under the direction of Doto Kazahana, the brother of the former daimyō. Doto abducts Koyuki, hoping to use her keystone necklace to activate the hidden treasure in the Land of Snow. In a pitched battle, Naruto defeats Doto, and the treasure is revealed to be a generator that turned the Land of Snow into the Land of Spring and memories of Koyuki and Sotetsu Kazahana discussing about what Koyuki was going to be when she turns old. As the group leaves, Naruto receives a signed autograph from Koyuki, who has agreed to assume her duties as daimyō.
	Naruto: Mission: Protect the Waterfall Village! Naruto: Takigakure no Shitō Ore ga Eiyū Dattebayo! (NARUTO―ナルト― 滝隠れの死闘 オレが英雄だってばよ！)	May 2, 2005; 978-4-08-873735-5	—
This ani-manga is based on the Naruto OVA episode Mission: Protect the Waterfall Village!. Team 7, along with Kakashi Hatake, escort a ninja named Shibuki, the leader of his village, to his home at Takigakure. Shibuki is a coward, however, due to circumstances surrounding his father's death. The Hidden Village has a secret bottle of water called the "Hero's Water". The water imbues whoever drinks it with a dramatic, but temporary, increase in chakra. The effects are similar to opening a "chakra gate", in that it can shorten lifespan as well. Five missing-nin come to the village to steal the Hero's Water, and Team 7 defends against the incursion.
	Naruto the Movie: Legend of the Stone of Gelel; Gekijōban Naruto: Daigekitotsu! Maboroshi no Chiteiiseki Dattebayo (劇場版NARUTO―ナルト― 大激突！ 幻の地底遺跡だってばよ)	March 3, 2006; 978-4-08-874077-5; ISBN 978-4-08-874078-2	November 4, 2008; 978-1-4215-1915-9
1. "A Suspicious Mission..." (疑惑の任務..., "Giwaku no ninmu"); 2. "Temujin, the Knight" (騎士·テムジン, "Kishi Temujin"); 3. "Haido Appears" (ハイド登場, "Haido tōjō"); 4. "Gaara Attacks!" (我愛羅、突貫!!, "Gaara, tokkan!!"); 5. "Craving for Power!!" (力への渇望!!, "Chikara e no katsubō!!"); 6. "Each One's Battle...!!" (それぞれの戦い...!!, "Sorezore no tatakai...!!"); 7. "Don't Give Up...!!" (あきらめない...!!, "Akiramenai...!!"); 8. "True Friends" (本当の仲間, "Honto no nakama")
This ani-manga is based on the second Naruto film, Naruto the Movie: Legend of the Stone of Gelel, and was originally released in two parts in Japan. The two parts were collected in a single volume for the English-language release. On a beach in Sunagakure, ninja Gaara and Kankuro among their ranks engage a group of armored warriors. Elsewhere, Naruto, Sakura, and Shikamaru complete their mission to find a lost ferret. On their way back, they are attacked by a group of armored warriors under the direction of a young knight. The knight and Naruto's battle results in them being knocked unconscious and carried by a stream. When they awake, the knight reveals his name, Temujin, and takes Naruto to his leader, Haido, who wishes to establish a utopia. However, his motives, conquering the world by finding the source of Gelel, or life energy, are eventually shown to Naruto. Even after Haido finds the source, which vastly increases his powers, Naruto and Temujin manage to defeat him together. In the finale, Temujin and his friends sail away in a ship, hoping to create their own utopia.
	Naruto the Movie: Guardians of the Crescent Moon Kingdom; Gekijōban Naruto: Dai Kōfun! Mikazuki-jima no Animaru Panikku Dattebayo! (劇場版NARUTO―ナルト― 大興奮！みかづき島のアニマル騒動だってばよ)	April 4, 2007; 978-4-08-874193-2	November 4, 2008; 978-1-4215-1916-6
1. "The Prince of the Moon Country" (月の国の王子, "Tsuki no kuni no ōji"); 2. "A Stormy Sea and a Promise" (嵐の海と約束, "Arashi no umi to yakusoku"); 3. "The Moon Country's Cruel Plan" (月の国の非道な陰謀, "Tsuki no kuni no hidō na inbō"); 4. "The 3 Ninjas" (3人の忍, "Sannin no shinobi"); 5. "Captive Michiru, a determined Hikaru" (囚われのミチル、決意のヒカル, "Toraware no Michiru, Ketsui no Hikaru"); 6. "A Battle, Right Now!!" (いざ決戦!, "Iza kessen!")
This ani-manga is based on the third Naruto film, Naruto the Movie: Guardians of the Crescent Moon Kingdom. Naruto, Sakura, Lee, and Kakashi are assigned to protect the prince of the Land of Moon, Michiru Tsuki, and his son, Hikaru Tsuki. Initially, Naruto is incensed by the pair's spoiled nature, especially Hikaru's. Eventually, after Hikaru shows his bravery during a storm, when he saves a tiger, Naruto warms up to him. When they arrive in the Land of Moon, the king's minister, Shabadaba, has orchestrated a coup with the aid of several ninja, mortally wounding the present king in the process. As Michiru and Hikaru are shepherded to safety, the hired ninja, under the command of their leader, Ishidate, manage to abduct Michiru. Naruto convinces Hikaru to organize a rescue operation, and the ninja are defeated, with Michiru and Hikaru aiding Naruto in defeating Ishidate. After the battle, Michiru becomes the new king, learning the importance of caring for his family instead of material possessions.

=== Naruto Shippuden ===
No.	Title	Original release date	English release date
	Naruto Shippuden the Movie; Gekijōban Naruto Shippūden (劇場版NARUTO―ナルト― 疾風伝)	August 4, 2008; 978-4-08-874249-6	—
This ani-manga is based on the first Naruto Shippuden film, Naruto Shippuden the Movie. Naruto, Sakura, Neji and Lee are assigned to protect the priestess Shion. Shion is able to seal a dangerous demon called Mōryō, but when she meets Naruto, she has a prediction of his death so she attempts not to work. However, Naruto insists that he will not die and convinces her to seal the demon. With help from various ninja from Konoha, Naruto and Shion join forces to destroy Mōryō, making Shion realize the destiny can be surpassed.
	Naruto Shippuden the Movie: Bonds; Gekijōban Naruto Shippūden: Kizuna (劇場版NARUTO―ナルト― 疾風伝 絆)	July 24, 2009; 978-4-08-874824-5	—
This ani-manga is based on the second Naruto Shippuden film, Naruto Shippuden the Movie: Bonds. As an act of revenge, the Sky Country invades Konoha, causing mass mayhem. A girl called Amaru appears, saying her teacher was already attacked by those ninja, and a team composed of Naruto, Sakura and Hinata go to help her. As they enter a ruin from the village, they discover Amaru's teacher, Shinnō, alive, but he is revealed as the one who organized the invasion to Konoha. Shinnō plans to get a scroll from Konoha to get immortality, but Sasuke Uchiha appears to stop him since his master, Orochimaru, has the same objective. Naruto and Sasuke decide to fight together and defeat Shinnō, though in the end Sasuke returns to train with Orochimaru.
	Naruto Shippuden: Kakashi Chronicles - A Boy's Life on the Battlefield; Terubi-ban Anime-Komikkusu Naruto Shippūden: Kakashi Gaiden ~Senshō no Bōizu Raifu~ (TV版アニメコミックス NARUTO－ナルト－疾風伝 カカシ外伝～戦場のボーイズライフ～)	June 4, 2010; 978-4-08-874837-5	—
This ani-manga is based on episodes 119 and 120 of Naruto Shippuden's sixth season, Kakashi Chronicles - A Boy's Life on the Battlefield Parts 1 and 2. Around 17 years ago, during the Third Great Ninja War, the future Fourth Hokage, Minato Namikaze, assigns 13-year-old Kakashi Hatake, Obito Uchiha, and Rin, a medical ninja, on a mission to destroy Kannabi Bridge. As they head off, Kakashi unveils his new jutsu: Chidori (千鳥; lit. "One Thousand Birds"), which Minato notes is incomplete. That night, Minato tells Obito about how Kakashi's father committed suicide after being disgraced. The next day, Minato leaves and Rin is later kidnapped. Kakashi refuses to save her, but Obito ignores him and heads off on his own. Obito finds Rin but is attacked by a Stone Ninja. Kakashi arrives and loses his left eye trying to save Obito. To help Kakashi, Obito is able to awaken his Sharingan (写輪眼; lit. "Copy Wheel Eye", English manga: "Mirror Wheel Eye"). They both then rescue Rin, but the cave they are in collapses on them, crushing Obito's right side. Obito decides to donate his left Sharingan eye to Kakashi and asks him to protect Rin. Kakashi then protects Rin from the enemy ninja before losing consciousness. They are later saved by Minato, who helps them complete their mission and destroy Kannabi Bridge.
	Naruto Shippuden the Movie: The Will of Fire; Gekijōban Naruto Shippūden: Hi no Ishi o Tsugu Mono (劇場版NARUTO―ナルト― 疾風伝 火の意志を継ぐ者)	July 16, 2010; 978-4-08-874838-2	—
This ani-manga is based on the third Naruto Shippuden film, Naruto Shippuden the Movie: The Will of Fire. It concerns the race to defeat Hiruko, a man who developed the Chimera technique, a jutsu that absorbs the chakra and Kekkei Genkai of other ninja. As a result, there is the potential outbreak of a Fourth Great Shinobi World War when ninja with Kekkei Genkai abilities begin to disappear from Land of Kumogakure, Iwagakure, Kirigakure, and Sunagakure. As the only village unscathed, Konohagakure is believed by the other nations to be behind the incident, and rumors circulate that they are preparing a rebellion. With the other nations amassing troops at the Land of Fire's borders, threatening invasion, the lord tries to find those responsible and prove Konoha's innocence; in the event of failure, the Land of Fire will be forced to destroy the village in order to preserve world peace.
	Naruto Shippuden the Movie: The Lost Tower; Gekijōban Naruto Shippūden: Za Rosuto Tawā (劇場版NARUTO―ナルト― 疾風伝 ザ・ロストタワー)	August 4, 2011; 978-4-08-874862-7	—
This ani-manga is based on the fourth Naruto Shippuden film, Naruto Shippuden the Movie: The Lost Tower. Naruto is sent on a mission to capture the missing-nin Mukade, who travels back in time using an ancient chakra flow underground. Naruto is dragged to the past six years after Mukade does this, where he has become known as Anrokuzan. Anrokuzan plans to kill Sara, the princess from the country of Rouran. Naruto continues his mission to stop him, eventually joining forces with comrades from the past, including his father Minato Namikaze.

=== Collections ===
No.	Title	Original release date	English release date
1	Naruto Complete Collection: Uzumaki Megavolume; Naruto Sōshūhen: Uzumaki Daikan (NARUTO—ナルト— 総集編 うずまき大巻)	April 1, 2009	—
The book is a digest-style collection of the entirety of Part I in eight sōshūhen volumes. It was published by Shueisha from November 7, 2008 through April 1, 2009. These books were printed with lower quality paper stock, but in a larger format than the tankōbon edition and with faithfully reproduced color pages from its original serialization, in addition to posters, interviews, and other bonus features.
2	Naruto Remix	—	—
This book is an omnibus edition of the Naruto series and began publication by Shueisha on April 24, 2015, under their Shueisha Jump Remix imprint, releasing two new volumes a month. Similar to the 3-in-1 Edition published by Viz Media, the Shueisha Jump Remix edition of Naruto collects just over 30 chapters in each of its 600+ page volumes, which are dubbed Chronicles (伝, Den).
3	Naruto: 3-in-1 Edition	—	—
The book is an English-language omnibus version of Naruto and began publication by Viz Media in May 2011. Billed as a more affordable alternative to purchasing individual or out-of-print volumes, each omnibus collects three volumes; lower quality paper stock is used compared with the trade paperback editions, but the physical dimensions are slightly larger. 24 3-in-1 volumes have been published as of October 2, 2018, comprising all 72 volumes of Naruto.
4	Naruto: Color Edition; Naruto Karā-han (NARUTO—ナルト— カラー版)	—	—
The book is a digitally colorized version of Naruto. It began publication in December 2012, under Shueisha's newly established Jump Comics Digital imprint, as part of their Digital Colored Comics line. As of August 1, 2015, all 72 colorized volumes are available to be purchased through a wide variety of Japanese eBook services. Colorization of the original black and white images was handled by Shueisha's production team and Artra Entertainment. In April 2014, Shueisha additionally published three free Naruto Starter Books (NARUTO—ナルト— STARTER BOOK) under the Jump Comics Digital imprint, each featuring six full color chapters of the manga, which serve as jumping-off points for new readers. From 2013 through 2014, digital editions of Weekly Shōnen Jump included colorized versions of Naruto chapters Number 638, 676, 678, and 693-699 as digital bonuses.

== Fiction books ==
=== Novelizations ===
From 2002 through 2009, Shueisha published light novel adaptations of the first seven Naruto and Naruto Shippuden films, as well as adaptations of the "Land of Waves" Naruto story arc and the first Naruto OVA, all written by Masatoshi Kusakabe. Adaptations of Blood Prison and Road to Ninja were published in 2011 and 2012, written by Akira Higashiyama and Yuka Miyata, respectively. The first two of Masatoshi Kusakabe's novelizations were licensed by Viz Media for publication in North America in November 2006 and October 2007.

No.	Title	Original release date	English release date
1	Naruto: Innocent Heart, Demonic Blood; Naruto: Shiro no Dōji, Ketsupū no Kijin (NARUTO－ナルト－ 白の童子、血風の鬼人)	December 16, 2002; 978-4-08-703121-8	November 21, 2006; 978-1-4215-0603-6
2	Naruto: Mission: Protect the Waterfall Village! Naruto: Takigakure no Shitō Ore ga Hīrō dattebayo! (NARUTO－ナルト－ 滝隠れの死闘 オレが英雄だってばよ！)	December 15, 2003; 978-4-08-321084-6	October 16, 2007; 978-1-4215-1502-1
3	Naruto: Ninja Clash in the Land of Snow; Naruto: Daikatsugeki! Yukihime Ninpōchō dattebayo!! (NARUTO―ナルト― 大活劇！ 雪姫忍法帖だってばよ！！)	August 23, 2004; 978-4-08-703143-0	—
4	Naruto the Movie: Legend of the Stone of Gelel; Gekijōban Naruto: Daigekitotsu! Maboroshi no Chiteiiseki Dattebayo (劇場版NARUTO―ナルト― 大激突！ 幻の地底遺跡だってばよ)	August 22, 2005; 978-4-08-703158-4	—
5	Naruto the Movie: Guardians of the Crescent Moon Kingdom; Gekijōban Naruto: Dai Kōfun! Mikazuki-jima no Animaru Panikku Dattebayo (劇場版NARUTO―ナルト― 大興奮！みかづき島のアニマル騒動だってばよ)	August 7, 2006; 978-4-08-703170-6	—
6	Naruto Shippuden the Movie; Gekijōban Naruto Shippūden (劇場版NARUTO―ナルト― 疾風伝)	August 6, 2007; 978-4-08-703187-4	—
7	Naruto Shippuden the Movie: Bonds; Gekijōban Naruto Shippūden: Kizuna (劇場版NARUTO―ナルト― 疾風伝 絆)	August 4, 2008; 978-4-08-703195-9	—
8	Naruto Shippuden the Movie: The Will of Fire; Gekijōban Naruto Shippūden: Hi no Ishi wo Tsugumono (劇場版NARUTO―ナルト― 疾風伝 火の意志を継ぐ者)	August 3, 2009; 978-4-08-703207-9	—
9	Naruto Shippuden the Movie: The Lost Tower; Gekijōban Naruto Shippūden: Za Rosuto Tawā (劇場版NARUTO―ナルト― 疾風伝 ザ・ロストタワー)	August 2, 2010; 978-4-08-703228-4	—
10	Naruto: Blood Prison; Naruto: Buraddo Purizun (NARUTO―ナルト― 鬼燈の城)	July 4, 2011; 978-4-08-703249-9	—
11	Road to Ninja: Naruto the Movie	July 27, 2012; 978-4-08-703270-3	—
12	The Last: Naruto the Movie	December 8, 2014; 978-4-08-703339-7	—
13	Boruto: Naruto the Movie	August 10, 2015; 978-4-08-703373-1	—

=== Original novels ===
Three original stories written by Akira Higashiyama and illustrated by Masashi Kishimoto have been published in Japan.

No.	Title	Original release date	English release date
1	Naruto: Tales of a Gutsy Ninja; Naruto: Dokonjō Ninden (NARUTO―ナルト―ド根性忍伝)	August 4, 2010; 978-4-08-703229-1	—
The first, Naruto: Tales of a Gutsy Ninja, was published in August 2010 and is presented as the actual in-universe debut novel of Jiraiya, Naruto Uzumaki's mentor and a famed author in the Naruto world, which has acted as a plot device at various points throughout the series. This story within a story follows the adventures of Naruto's namesake, the fictional "gutsy ninja" Naruto Musasabi, as he tries to track down his former comrade, Renge Momoashi, and unravel a mysterious conspiracy involving the destruction of a nearby village.
2	Naruto Jinraiden: The Day the Wolf Howled; Naruto Jinraiden: Ōkami no Naku Hi (NARUTO－ナルト－ 迅雷伝 狼の哭く日)	November 2, 2012; 978-4-08-703279-6	—
The second original novel, Naruto Jinraiden: The Day the Wolf Howled, is set shortly after Sasuke Uchiha killed his brother, Itachi, and follows his journey to Howling Wolf Village, where Itachi's eye medicine was produced. There, he meets Reishi and Kina, two local brothers with whom Itachi was acquainted, and tries to learn more about his brother's motivations while helping the two battle shinobi from a rival clan and a wolf-like beast from a local legend.
3	Naruto: Tales of a Chaste Ninja; Naruto: Dojunjō Ninden (NARUTO―ナルト―ド純情忍伝)	August 4, 2015; 978-4-08-703371-7	—
A third original novel, Naruto: Tales of a Chaste Ninja, was announced in June 2015 as a follow-up to Naruto: Tales of a Gusty Ninja. Again presented as an in-universe novel written by Jiraiya, this story — described as the inspiration for his later Make Out (イチャイチャ, Icha Icha) book series — depicts a pair of naive shinobi who fall in love on the battlefield.
4	Naruto: Konoha's New Story — Steam Ninja Scrolls; Naruto: Konoha Shinden — Yukemuri Ninpōchō (NARUTO－ナルト－ 木ノ葉新伝 湯煙忍法帖)	August 4, 2016; 978-4-08-703401-1	—
Additionally, a stand-alone follow-up to the Secret Chronicles and True Stories series written by Shō Hinata and illustrated by Masashi Kishimoto, Naruto: Konoha's New Story — Steam Ninja Scrolls, was published on August 4, 2016. Set between the final chapter of Naruto and the first chapter of Naruto: The Seventh Hokage and the Scarlet Spring, it details Mirai Sarutobi's mission to escort Kakashi Hatake and Might Guy on their vacation to a hot spring and ties together the events of Naruto and Boruto: Naruto Next Generations.
5	Naruto: Naruto's Story — Family Day; Naruto Shinden: Oyako no Hi (NARUTO-ナルト新伝 親子の日)	May 2, 2018; 978-4-08-703447-9	August 4, 2020; 978-1-9747-1342-4
Written by Mirei Miyamoto and illustrated by Masashi Kishimoto, Naruto, the 7th Hokage, declares a "Parent and Child" Day in Konoha.
6	Naruto: Sasuke's Story — Star Pupil; Naruto: Sasuke Shinden: Shitei no Hoshi (NARUTO-ナルト- サスケ新伝 師弟の星)	June 4, 2018; 978-4-08-703450-9	October 6, 2020; 978-1-9747-1332-5
Written by Jun Esaka and illustrated by Masashi Kishimoto, set after the Versus Momoshiki arc, Sasuke begins training with Boruto and Team 7 as a popular idol in the Land of Fire, Lily, requests Boruto and his team to protect her during a live performance, but there's a secret, massive plot being planned behind their backs. With Konoha at center stage, questions, such as the difference between student and master, begins to loom over the next generation of ninjas. Due to mysterious terrorists, there's been an explosion incident on the electric train, causing Konohamaru to become injured, leaving Sasuke as the substitute leader of Team 7.
7	Naruto: Shikamaru's New Story - A Cloud Dancing in Forlorn Falling Petals; Naruto: Shikamaru Shinden: Maichiru Hana o Ureu Kumo (NARUTO-ナルト- シカマル新伝 舞い散る華を憂う雲)	July 4, 2018; 978-4-08-703456-1	-
Written by Takashi Yano and illustrated by Masashi Kishimoto, set during the Mujina Bandits arc, the Shinobi Union is tested, forcing Shikamaru to take drastic measures.

==== Naruto Secret Chronicles series ====
Naruto Secret Chronicles (NARUTO -ナルト- 秘伝, Naruto Hiden") is a light novel series illustrated by Masashi Kishimoto, which explores the stories of various characters after the conclusion of the original Naruto manga series. Announced in November 2014 alongside the final chapter of the manga, the series comprises six volumes, with the first released in February 2015. Viz Media began publishing English translations of the novels in November 2015, starting with Naruto: Kakashi's Story.

No.	Title	Original release date	English release date
1	Naruto: Kakashi's Story — Lightning in the Frozen Sky; Naruto: Kakashi Hiden — Hyōten no Ikazuchi (NARUTO－ナルト－ カカシ秘伝 氷天の雷)	February 4, 2015; 978-4-08-703344-1	November 3, 2015; 978-1-4215-8440-9
2	Naruto: Shikamaru's Story — A Cloud Drifting in the Silent Dark; Naruto: Shikamaru Hiden — Yami no Shijima ni Ukabu Kumo (NARUTO－ナルト－ シカマル秘伝 闇の黙に浮ぶ雲)	March 4, 2015; 978-4-08-703347-2	February 2, 2016; 978-1-4215-8441-6
3	Naruto: Sakura's Story — Love Riding the Spring Breeze; Naruto: Sakura Hiden — Shiren, Harukaze ni Nosete (NARUTO－ナルト－ サクラ秘伝 思恋、春風にのせて)	April 3, 2015; 978-4-08-703354-0	May 3, 2016; 978-1-4215-8442-3
4	Naruto: Konoha's Story (lit. "Naruto: Konoha Secret Chronicles — The Perfect Day for a Wedding"); Naruto: Konoha Hiden — Shūgenbiyori (NARUTO－ナルト－ 木ノ葉秘伝 祝言日和)	May 1, 2015; 978-4-08-703360-1	—
5	Naruto: Gaara's Story; Naruto: Gaara Hiden — Sajingensō (lit. "Naruto: Gaara Secret Chronicles — A Sandstorm Mirage") (NARUTO－ナルト－ 我愛羅秘伝 砂塵幻想)	June 4, 2015; 978-4-08-703364-9	—
6	Naruto: The Akatsuki's Story (lit. "Naruto: Akatsuki Secret Chronicles — Evil Flowers in Full Bloom"); Naruto: Akatsuki Hiden — Sakimidareru Aku no Hana (NARUTO－ナルト－ 暁秘伝 咲き乱れる悪の華)	July 3, 2015; 978-4-08-703367-0	—

==== Naruto True Stories series ====
Naruto True Stories (NARUTO -ナルト- 真伝, Naruto Shinden) is a light novel trilogy illustrated by Masashi Kishimoto, which explores Itachi Uchiha's past and Sasuke Uchiha's future. The Naruto True Story novels were announced in June 2015, with a publication date in Fall 2015. Viz Media began publishing English translations of the novels in November 2016.

No.	Title	Original release date	English release date
1	Naruto: Itachi's Story — Daylight (lit. "Naruto: Itachi's True Story — Book of Bright Light"); Naruto: Itachi — Shinden Kōmyō-hen (NARUTO－ナルト－ イタチ真伝 光明篇)	September 4, 2015; 978-4-08-703375-5	November 1, 2016; 978-1-4215-9130-8
2	Naruto: Itachi's Story — Midnight (lit. "Naruto: Itachi's True Story — Book of Dark Night"); Naruto: Itachi — Shinden An'ya-hen (NARUTO－ナルト－ イタチ真伝 暗夜篇)	October 2, 2015; 978-4-08-703380-9	December 6, 2016; 978-1-4215-9131-5
3	Naruto: Sasuke's Story — Sunrise (lit. "Naruto: Sasuke's True Story — Book of Sunrise"); Naruto: Sasuke Shinden — Raikō-hen (NARUTO－ナルト－ サスケ真伝 来光篇)	November 4, 2015; 978-4-08-703384-7	March 7, 2017; 978-1-4215-9129-2

==== Naruto Retsuden Stories Series ====
Naruto Retsuden (NARUTO -ナルト- 烈伝, literally meaning: Naruto Intense Story) is a light novel series which was released from June to October 2019.

No.	Title	Original release date	English release date
1	Kakashi Retsuden: The Sixth Hokage and the Failure Boy NARUTO -ナルト- カカシ烈伝 六代目火影と落ちこぼれの少年, Kakashi Retsuden: Rokudaime Hokage to Ochikobore no Shōnen	June 4, 2019 978-4-08-703477-6	July 26, 2022 978-1-9747-3257-9
2	Sasuke Retsuden: The Uchiha Descendants and the Heavenly Stardust NARUTO -ナルト- サスケ烈伝 うちはの末裔と天球の星屑, Sasuke Retsuden: Uchiha no Matsuei to Tenkyū no Hoshikuzu	August 2, 2019 978-4-08-703481-3	November 22, 2022 978-1-9747-3258-6
3	Naruto Retsuden: Naruto Uzumaki and the Spiral Destiny NARUTO -ナルト- ナルト烈伝 うずまきナルトと螺旋の天命, Naruto Retsuden: Uzumaki Naruto to Rasen no Tenmei	October 4, 2019 978-4-08-703486-8	March 28, 2023 978-1-9747-3259-3

== Supplemental material ==
Several supplemental guides and artbooks have been published, collecting information and artwork from the manga and anime series. Three of the artbooks collect Masashi Kishimoto's illustrations for the manga and related promotional materials, while a fourth anniversary book features artwork produced over the first ten years of the anime series' broadcast. Among the guidebooks, there are three anime profile books, which contain character profiles and images taken from the anime; two fanbooks, which include interviews, articles, and special features relating to the manga; and three data books, which collect detailed information on the characters, abilities, locations, and story arcs seen in the manga. A guidebook for the theatrical film Road to Ninja: Naruto the Movie was also published and distributed with copies of Naruto volume 61; featuring information on the film, an interview with Kishimoto, and the Movie 9: Road to Naruto the Movie one-shot, it was printed in the same format as a standard Naruto volume. Naruto's databooks are also considered Kishimoto's and supervised by him

=== Anime profiles ===
No.	Title	Original release date	English release date
1	Naruto Anime Profiles, Vol. 1 Naruto Ofisharu AnimēshonBOOK Hiden: Dōga Emaki (NARUTO－ナルト－ オフィシャルアニメーションBOOK 秘伝・動画絵巻)	December 4, 2003; 4-08-873550-1	July 5, 2006; 1-4215-0657-2
2	Naruto Anime Profiles, Vol. 2 Naruto Ofisharu AnimēshonBOOK Hiden: Shippū Emaki (NARUTO―ナルト― オフィシャルアニメーションBOOK 秘伝・疾風絵巻)	August 4, 2004; 4-08-873709-1	September 18, 2007; 1-4215-1326-9
3	Naruto Anime Profiles, Vol. 3 Naruto Ofisharu AnimēshonBOOK Hiden: Rettō Emaki (NARUTO―ナルト― オフィシャルアニメーションBOOK 秘伝・烈闘絵巻)	August 4, 2005; 4-08-873757-1	September 23, 2008; 1-4215-1889-9

=== Artbooks ===
No.	Title	Original release date	English release date
1	The Art of Naruto: Uzumaki (lit. "Masashi Kishimoto Art Collection: Uzumaki"); Kishimoto Masashi Gashū: Uzumaki (岸本斉史画集 UZUMAKI)	July 2, 2004; 978-4-08-873706-5	October 25, 2007; 978-1-4215-1407-9
2	Paint Jump: Art of Naruto; PAINT JUMP Art of NARUTO－ナルト－	April 4, 2008; 978-4-08-782168-0	—
3	Naruto Illustration Book (lit. "Naruto Illustration Collection: Naruto"); Naruto Irasuto-shū: Naruto (NARUTO―ナルト―イラスト集 NARUTO)	July 8, 2009; 978-4-08-874823-8	October 26, 2010; 978-1-4215-3869-3
4	Naruto: One Decade, One Hundred Ninja; Naruto: Jūnen Hyakunin (NARUTO－ナルト－ 十年百忍)	August 4, 2009; 978-4-08-874825-2	—
5	Uzumaki Naruto: Illustrations (lit. "Naruto Illustration Collection: Naruto Uzumaki"); Naruto Irasuto-shū: Uzumaki Naruto (NARUTO―ナルト―イラスト集 UZUMAKI NARUTO)	February 4, 2015; 978-4-08-880384-5	November 3, 2015; 978-1-4215-8439-3

=== Data books ===
No.	Title	Original release date	English release date
1	Naruto: The First Official Character Data Book (lit. "Naruto Character Official Data Book: Secret Chronicles — Record of Confrontation"); Naruto Kyarakutā Ofisharu Dēta Book: Hiden — Rin no Sho (NARUTO―ナルト―キャラクターオフィシャルデータBOOK 秘伝・臨の書)	July 4, 2002; 978-4-08-873288-6	—
2	Naruto: The Official Fanbook (lit. "Naruto Official Fan Book: Secret Chronicles — Record of Warriors"); Naruto Ofisharu Fan Book: Hiden — Hyō no Sho (NARUTO―ナルト―オフォシャルファンBOOK 秘伝・の書)	October 4, 2002; 978-4-08-873321-0	February 5, 2008; 978-1-4215-1844-2
3	Naruto: The Second Official Character Data Book (lit. "Naruto Character Official Data Book: Secret Chronicles — Record of Battle"); Naruto Kyarakutā Ofisharu Dēta Book: Hiden — Tō no Sho (NARUTO―ナルト―キャラクターオフィシャルデータBOOK 秘伝・闘の書)	April 4, 2005; 978-4-08-873734-8	—
4	Naruto: The Third Official Character Data Book (lit. "Naruto Character Official Data Book: Secret Chronicles — Record of Someone"); Naruto Kyarakutā Ofisharu Dēta Book: Hiden — Sha no Sho (NARUTO―ナルト―キャラクターオフィシャルデータBOOK 秘伝・者の書)	September 4, 2008; 978-4-08-874247-2	January 10, 2012; 978-1-4215-4125-9
5	Naruto: The Official Premium Fanbook (lit. "Naruto Official Premium Fan Book: Secret Chronicles — Record of Everyone"); Naruto Ofisharu Puremiamu Fan Book: Hiden — Kai no Sho (NARUTO―ナルト―オフィシャルプレミアムファンBOOK 秘伝・皆の書)	December 4, 2009; 978-4-08-874834-4	—
6	Naruto: The Fourth Official Character Data Book (lit. "Naruto Character Official Data Book: Secret Chronicles — Record of Formation"); Naruto Kyarakutā Ofisharu Dēta Book: Hiden — Jin no Sho (NARUTO―ナルト―キャラクターオフィシャルデータBOOK 秘伝・陣の書)	November 4, 2014; 978-4-08-880263-3	—
7	Naruto: The First Official Movie Book (lit. "Naruto Official Movie Book: Secret Chronicles — Record or Ranks"); Naruto Ofisharu Mūbī Book: Hiden — Retsu no Sho (NARUTO―ナルト―オフィシャルムービーBOOK 秘伝・列の書)	December 6, 2014	—
8	Naruto Exhibition: The Official Guestbook (lit. "Naruto Exhibition Official Guestbook: New Chronicles — Record of Wind"); Naruto-ten Ofisharu Gesuto Book: Shinden — Fū no Sho (NARUTO－ナルト－展オフィシャルゲストBOOK 新伝・風の書)	April 25, 2015	—
9	Naruto Exhibition: The Premium Fanbook (lit. "Naruto Exhibition Premium Fanbook: New Chronicles — Record of Lightning"); Naruto-ten Puremiamu Fan Book: Shinden — Rai no Sho (NARUTO－ナルト－展プレミアムファンBOOK 新伝・雷の書)	April 25, 2015	—
10	Naruto: The Second Official Movie Book (lit. "Naruto Official Movie Book: Secret Chronicles — Record or Existence"); Naruto Ofisharu Mūbī Book: Hiden — Zai no Sho (NARUTO―ナルト―オフィシャルムービーBOOK 秘伝・在の書)	August 7, 2015	—

=== Other guides ===
No.	Title	Japanese release date	Japanese ISBN
1	Naruto Kizuna: The Words That Bind — Scroll of Heaven; Naruto: Meigonshū Kizuna - Ten no Maki (NARUTO－ナルト－名言集 絆－KIZUNA－ 天ノ巻)	March 15, 2013	978-4-08-720681-4
2	Naruto Kizuna: The Words That Bind — Scroll of Earth; Naruto: Meigonshū Kizuna - Chi no Maki (NARUTO－ナルト－名言集 絆－KIZUNA－ 地ノ巻)	March 15, 2013	978-4-08-720682-1
3	Masashi Kishimoto's Naruto Exhibition Official Guidebook: Michi; Rensai Kanketsu Kinen Kishimoto Masashi Naruto-ten Kōshiki Gaidobukku: Michi (連載完結記念 岸本斉史 NARUTO－ナルト－展 公式ガイドブック「道－MICHI－」)	April 25, 2015	—

== Films ==
Naruto was adapted into 11 theatrical films. The first three films correspond to the first anime series, and the remaining eight correspond to the second.

1. Naruto the Movie: Ninja Clash in the Land of Snow (2004). Team 7 travels to the Land of Snow to protect the actors during the shooting of Yukie's film.
2. Naruto the Movie: Legend of the Stone of Gelel (2005). Naruto, Shikamaru, and Sakura go on a ninja mission involving them in a war between the Sunaga village and a large force of armored warriors. Unlike its predecessor, Legend of the Stone of Gelel did not have a theatrical release in the United States. It was released in direct-to-video format instead.
3. Naruto the Movie: Guardians of the Crescent Moon Kingdom (2006). Naruto, Sakura, Lee, and Kakashi are assigned to protect the future prince of the Land of Moon, Hikaru Tsuki.
4. Naruto Shippuden the Movie (2007). Naruto goes on a mission to protect the priestess Shion, who makes visions about his death.
5. Naruto Shippuden the Movie: Bonds (2008). Naruto and Sasuke are forced to join forces when ninja from the Sky Country attack Konoha.
6. Naruto Shippuden the Movie: The Will of Fire (2009). Team 7 works to prevent Kakashi from sacrificing himself and ending the war.
7. Naruto Shippuden the Movie: The Lost Tower (2010). Naruto is sent 20 years into the past as he explores a mystical tower to capture a rogue ninja and discovers the Fourth Hokage Minato Namikaze, his father, alive in the timeline.
8. Naruto the Movie: Blood Prison (2011). Naruto is framed for attempted murder of the Raikage. While attempting to escape from prison, he discovers its real secrets.
9. Road to Ninja: Naruto the Movie (2012). Naruto and Sakura are sent to an alternate universe by Tobi, and discover the meaning of companionship and parenthood. The story planning and character designs were created by Kishimoto.
10. The Last: Naruto the Movie (2014). (Note: The film is set two years after the conclusion of the manga.) Naruto and his companions try to stop the moon from colliding with Earth. The film explains some loose ends involving the series' mythology, and focuses on the relationship between Naruto and Hinata. Kishimoto served as the film's chief story supervisor, story writer, and character designer.
11. Boruto: Naruto the Movie (2015). (Note: The film is set fifteen years after the conclusion of the manga.) The film focuses on the children of the main characters, mainly Boruto Uzumaki, who trains with his father's best friend and former rival Sasuke Uchiha to surpass him. Kishimoto served as the film's chief production supervisor, screenwriter, and character designer.

== Original video animations ==
There are 12 original video animations (OVAs) in Naruto.

1. Find the Crimson Four-Leaf Clover! (2002). Naruto, Konohamaru, and his friends, go on a mission to retrieve a four leaf clover that makes a wish come true.
2. Mission: Protect the Waterfall Village! (2003). Naruto, Sasuke, Sakura, and Kakashi, are on a mission to escort a ninja to his hometown. This and the previous OVA were later released on DVD in Australia under the title Naruto Jump Festa Collection. The English localization of Mission: Protect the Waterfall Village! was released on DVD by Viz on May 22, 2007, in the United States under the title Naruto – The Lost Story.
3. Hidden Leaf Village Grand Sports Festival (2004). Multiple groups of ninjas, including Team 7, participate in a sports competition where the award is a week break from missions.
4. Finally a clash! Jonin VS Genin!! Indiscriminate grand melee tournament meeting!! (2005) Fifth Hokage Tsunade creates a competition between Jonin (high level ninja) and Genin (low level ninja). Released on a bonus disk with the Japanese edition of the Naruto: Ultimate Ninja 3 video game for the PlayStation 2.
5. Hurricane! "Konoha Academy" Chronicles (2008). This OVA follows Naruto and his peers, as they attend high school.
6. Naruto: The Cross Roads (2009). Focuses on Team 7, after their encounter with Zabuza and Haku.
7. Naruto, The Genie, and The Three Wishes!! (2010). While Team 7 are at the beach, Naruto finds a bottle and opens it to find a genie who grants three wishes.
8. Naruto x UT (2011). Naruto is defeated by Sasuke and is pronounced dead; the events leading to the combat are shown in flashback.
9. Chūnin Exam on Fire! Naruto vs. Konohamaru! (2011). Naruto and Konohamaru are participants in the Chunin Exams, and are matched with each other; they fight with no limits.
10. Hashirama Senju vs. Madara Uchiha (2012). Tobi narrates the origin of Konoha. In the beginning, ninjas fought for their own clans. The most powerful among them are two clans: the Senju led by Hashirama, and the Uchiha led by Madara. This was distributed as part of the Naruto Shippuden: Ultimate Ninja Storm Generations video game for the PlayStation 3 and Xbox 360.
11. Naruto Shippūden: Sunny Side Battle!!! (2014). In his sleep, Sasuke dreams of his brother Itachi making him breakfast repeatedly until it is perfect.
12. The Day Naruto Became Hokage (2016). Naruto is officially the Seventh Hokage, but does not make it to the ceremony due to an incident that occurred in the Uzumaki Residence.

== Stage play video releases ==
Stage play video releases
Title	Home release	Description
LIVE SPECTACLE NARUTO (2015)	August 26, 2015	Retells the story 'til the battle at the Valley of the End.
LIVE SPECTACLE NARUTO (2016)	December 14, 2016	Re-enactment with some cast changes, adds Rock Lee.
Live Spectacle "NARUTO" – Akatsuki no Shirabe (2017)	December 13, 2017	English transliteration: "The Akatsuki Investigation", continues Sasuke's quest for his brother and Naruto's training with Jiraiya
Live Spectacle "NARUTO" – Akatsuki no Shirabe (2019)	June 24, 2020	Cast changes
Live Spectacle "NARUTO" – Uzumaki Naruto Monogatari (2021)	June 22, 2022	Covers Pain's Assault arc and Five Kage Summit arc.
Live Spectacle "NARUTO" – Ninkai Taisen, Kaisen (2022)	March 26, 2023	Covers Fourth Shinobi World War arc.
Live Spectacle "NARUTO" – Shinobi no Ikiru Michi (2023)	April 24, 2024	Covers latest arcs.
