= Cannon God Exaxxion =

Japanese manga series

- First tankōbon volume cover, featuring Hoichi Kano

砲神エグザクソン (Hōjin Eguzakuson)
- Genre: Action; Science fiction
- Manga
- Written by: Kenichi Sonoda
- Published by: Kodansha
- English publisher: NA: Dark Horse Manga
- Imprint: Afternoon KC
- Magazine: Monthly Afternoon
- English magazine: NA: Super Manga Blast!
- Original run: August 25, 1997 – May 25, 2004
- Volumes: 7
- icon

Cannon God Exaxxion (Japanese: 砲神エグザクソン, Hepburn: Hōjin Eguzakuson) is a Japanese manga series written and illustrated by Kenichi Sonoda. It was serialized in Kodansha's seinen manga magazine Monthly Afternoon from August 1997 to May 2004, with its chapters collected in seven tankōbon volumes. The manga was published in North America by Dark Horse Comics. The series follows Earth's fight against alien colonization with the help of giant robots and super powered battle suits.

== Story ==
Hoichi Kano, the Grandson (later revealed as son) of world-famous inventor Hosuke Kano, is a student at Howa High School in Musashino City, Japan. At the tenth anniversary of first contact with the Riofaldians, an alien race, the unveiling of an Elevator Ship, designed for orbital transport to and from the Riofald home world and Earth, is about to take place. However, this was just a ploy to take control of the Earth and establish a totalitarian occupation, using their advanced technology and large Riofaldian work force on Earth to their advantage. It is now up to Hoichi, with the help of his grandfather, his school friend Akane, and Isaka, who recently transferred to Howa High School, to stop them and save Earth.

== Characters ==
Hoichi Kano (加農 砲一, Kano Hōichi)
The main character of the series, Hoichi's life is turned upside down when the Riofaldian take over the Earth by force.
Hoichi is called "Gun" by his friends, which is a joke on his name. He is called this because the kanji symbol for Hō in his name (砲) means "gun" in Japanese. On the day of the tenth anniversary of first contact with the Riofaldians, Hoichi meets Isaka, a beautiful young high school girl who wants some time alone with Hoichi. She turns out to be a creation of Hosuke Kano, and gives Hoichi the Gunner Suit Glove, which allows Hoichi to change his clothes into a power suit. After fighting off Riofaldian robots, Hoichi is taken to the XXX Unit, Exaxxion.
Akane Hino (日野 茜, Hino Akane)
Akane is, like Hoichi, a Howa High School student, and a member of the school's media club. Akane has a long-standing crush on Hoichi and is a budding young journalist who wants to interview Hoichi's grandfather for the tenth anniversary of first contact. However, when the Riofaldians take over, Akane, because of her love for Hoichi, is launched into the fight to save humankind.
Isaka Minagata (水方 勇華, Minagata Isaka)
Hosuke Kano created Isaka to be Hoichi's private assistant in the war against the Riofaldians. She is a humanoid colony of nanites capable of a number of tasks including, but not limited to, providing Hoichi with vital information, transforming into an air bike, interfacing with computers, and defense against nanotech viruses. Isaka is also able to heal injuries in others by injecting medical nanites into others, an ability she extends to Hoichi, and transform matter. Isaka is extremely busty, but rather than fanservice, this is meant as a sign she's not "really' human because of her implausible breast size (furthermore, it contains the leftover mass from her air bike form). She reforms the jacket of his school uniform into nanomaterial by hugging him, making it able to turn into his Gunner Glove.
Hosuke Kano (加農 砲介, Kano Hōsuke)
Hosuke Kano is an old scientist who was made famous by his vehemently anti-'Faldie stance. When the Riofaldian forces take over, Hosuke is prepared, and has reverse-engineered their technology to use against them. The patents from the technology have led to him becoming a billionaire many times over. He is expedient and willing to sacrifice many lives to gain victory over the oppressors. He also keeps himself a private harem consisting of his daughter-in-law/wife (in fact, Hoichi is not his grandson but his actual son) and his all-female lab assistants, many of whom are 'sisters' of Isaka in that they are also nanite-based androids. As well as working to save the Earth, and as one of the maddest of mad scientists, old Hosuke is planning on ruling Earth, setting up Hoichi as the first heir in his dynasty. He dies from brain cancer inflicted by a Riofaldian assassin at the end of the series, with Isaka masquerading as him in public.
Ambassador Zobrozaphka Shes'ka (シェスカ・ゾブロザフカ, Sheska Zobrozavka)
Also known as General Zobrozaphka Shes'ka, The Riofaldian governor on Earth and one of the main antagonists on the aliens' side. Callous and scheming, he uses the people around him to try to gain an advantage. He has a personality somewhat like the historical Cardinal Richelieu, a man who is privately contemptuous of his inferiors but a natural flatterer of people who can help his career, and capable of putting on a very convincing act of sincerity. He proves equally willing to betray his own people as well as Earthlings. Very much a mirror to Dr. Hosuke Kano, Shes'ka is plotting to take over his own homeworld once he secures Exaxxion. After the failure of the Riofaldian attack, he agrees to a cease-fire and becomes a citizen of Earth along with the rest of the Riofaldians trapped by the closing of the wormhole linking the two planets.
Miss Kin'ba (キンバー, Kinbā)
A beautiful young Riofaldian teacher at Howa High School who quickly becomes an innocent target of hostilities by her pupils when the war breaks out. A total pacifist, she is appalled by the council's takeover, the wrath of most of her students (for whom she genuinely cares), and the horrifying methods the Riofaldians use (such as the slaughter of humans for making rations). She finds an ally and romantic interest in her pupil Murata, and after the end of the war both are engaged to marry.
Takashi Murata (村田 高司, Murata Takashi)
A classmate of Hoichi. Brash and outgoing, he can also be sensitive and caring, as he reveals when he defends his teacher Kin'ba from the attacks of his agitated fellow students. When some of them even go as far as raping her, he confesses that he is actually in love with her, and with the help of Dr. Hosuke Kano and Hoichi, manages to protect her until the end of the war.

The majority of the female characters appearing in the series have names which have been adapted from famous guns and their manufacturers. This stems from Sonoda's love of firearms, which he has already demonstrated in his previous series Gunsmith Cats.

== Mecha ==
An XXX, or in the Riofaldian language, Ra'un Meta'ar (ra'un meaning "three", meta'ar meaning "X"), Unit is a giant robot that uses antimatter as fuel. XXX Units are vanishingly rare; More common mechs instead use portable nuclear fusion reactors as power plants.

Almost all Riofaldian warfare is based on electricity, with all Riofaldian guns being electromagnetically assisted but using chemical propellant to provide fired projectiles with a relatively small amount of initial acceleration. Riofaldian military vehicles, including XXX Units, also rely heavily upon generating and shaping gravity and inertial fields that lessen impacts and allow vehicles to "fall up", bypassing many of the physical and mechanical limitations that the square-cube law usually imposes upon large structures: For example, Exaxxion walks on cushions of focused electromagnetic fields to prevent its feet from sinking into the ground.

=== Exaxxion ===
Exaxxion is the titular XXX Unit of Cannon God Exaxxion. It was discovered by Hosuke Kano during excavation of what was believed to be a meteorite, then subsequently restored to functionality using his large fortune. An ancient Riofaldian combat vehicle, Exaxxion's age dates back over 2,000 years. It is the most powerful XXX Unit in the series, due to its large antimatter power plant, which is able not only to store antimatter but also passively collect and produce fuel. This power plant design enables Exaxxion to handily outperform other mechs of similar mass, volume and construction in terms of power output. Exaxxion is irreplaceably unique; The technology used to construct its power plant can no longer be replicated by modern Riofaldian engineering as of the time of the manga's setting.

- Armaments and defensive equipment

Exaxxion possesses great arm strength, with which it can engage other mechs in hand-to-hand and close-quarters combat. The mech can extend opposable fingers and thumbs from the distal ends of its arms to manipulate objects.

To complement its strength, Exaxxion also fields a sizeable arsenal of large-caliber guns: In its right arm, Exaxxion houses an array of three 88 mm Gatling cannons; in its left is a single 460 mm chain gun (the same caliber as the battleship Yamato's main battery.)

Exaxxion's most powerful weapon is the Exa-Cannon. It is a 12 caliber cannon with a muzzle diameter of 4096 mm and a barrel length of 49.2 meters, located in Exaxxion's chest. It fires nanite-augmented 'morphing' rounds that change shape in flight to automatically adjust their trajectories, conferring limited tracking capabilities and superlative accuracy. For even more muzzle energy, a retractable barrel extension can be unfolded and secured onto the Exa-Cannon's muzzle, which increases the barrel length to 86.1 meters. This extension has handlebars that Exaxxion grips with its enormous arms to brace for firing.

For defense, Exaxxion carries an array of gravity and inertial field emitters that project shaped cushions of force around the mech; These cushions act as armor, rendering Exaxxion functionally invulnerable to weapons not specifically designed to pierce force fields. Emitters mounted on the legs near the mech's feet project a pair of cushions that perform a similar function to that of a pair of snowshoes, preventing the mech from sinking into terrain as it walks and preserving its mobility.

== Publication ==
Written and illustrated by Kenichi Sonoda, Cannon God Exaxxion was serialized in Kodansha's seinen manga magazine Monthly Afternoon from August 25, 1997, (Note: Debuted in the magazine's October 1997 issue, released on August 25 of that same year.) to May 25, 2004. (Note: Finished in the magazine's July 2004 issue, released on May 25 of that same year.) Kodansha collected its chapters in seven tankōbon volumes, released from June 23, 1998, to August 23, 2004.

In July 2001, Dark Horse Comics announced that they had licensed the series for distribution in North America, with the first issue to release in November of that year. Five volumes, titled "Stages", were published by Dark Horse before it was discontinued in 2006. The series also appeared in Dark Horse's long-running anthology magazine, Super Manga Blast!, starting in its 41st issue on March 31, 2004. It made its final appearance in the magazine's last issue on February 1, 2006.

Cannon God Exaxxion was also published in France by Glénat, and in Poland and Germany by Egmont.

=== Volumes ===
No.	Original release date	Original ISBN	English release date	English ISBN
1	June 23, 1998	978-4-06-314180-1	December 4, 2002	978-1-56971-745-5
2	March 23, 1999	978-4-06-314201-3	August 6, 2003	978-1-56971-966-4
3	June 22, 2000	978-4-06-314244-0	May 12, 2004	978-1-59307-087-8
4	July 23, 2001	978-4-06-314269-3	July 20, 2005	978-1-59307-338-1
5	July 23, 2002	978-4-06-314299-0	June 7, 2006	978-1-59307-571-2
6	September 22, 2003	978-4-06-314329-4	—	—
7	August 23, 2004	978-4-06-314352-2	—	—
