= Gunsmith Cats =

Japanese manga series and its adaptation

- First tankōbon volume cover, featuring May Hopkins (left) and Rally Vincent (right)
- Genre: Adventure; Crime; Girls with guns
- Manga
- Written by: Kenichi Sonoda
- Published by: Kodansha
- English publisher: NA/UK: Dark Horse Comics
- Imprint: Afternoon KC
- Magazine: Monthly Afternoon
- Original run: December 25, 1990 – April 25, 1997
- Volumes: 8
- Original video animation
- Directed by: Takeshi Mori; Kazuya Murata (unit director)
- Written by: Atsuji Kaneko
- Music by: Peter Erskine
- Studio: OLM Team Koitabashi
- Licensed by: NA: AnimEigo; UK: ADV Films
- Released: November 1, 1995 – September 1, 1996
- Episodes: 3
- Manga

Gunsmith Cats Burst
- Written by: Kenichi Sonoda
- Published by: Kodansha
- English publisher: NA/UK: Dark Horse Comics
- Imprint: Afternoon KC
- Magazine: Monthly Afternoon
- Original run: July 24, 2004 – September 25, 2008
- Volumes: 5
- icon

Gunsmith Cats (stylized as GUN SMITH CATS) is a Japanese manga series written and illustrated by Kenichi Sonoda and serialized in Kodansha's seinen manga magazine Monthly Afternoon from December 1990 to April 1997. Set in Chicago, the series follows Irene "Rally" Vincent, an expert gunsmith and bounty hunter, and her partner "Minnie" May Hopkins, a demolitions specialist and former call girl, as they operate the Gunsmith Cats gun shop while moonlighting as bounty hunters. In 1995, the series was adapted into a three-episode OVA by OLM, which presents an original storyline involving the duo investigating an arms trafficking conspiracy while being targeted by an assassin. A sequel series, titled Gunsmith Cats Burst (stylized in all caps), was serialized in Monthly Afternoon from July 2004 to September 2008.

== Plot ==
Irene "Rally" Vincent operates the titular "Gunsmith Cats" gun shop but also works as a bounty hunter, which is the impetus behind many of the stories. She is assisted in both activities by her roommate, and former partner in crime and explosive expert "Minnie" May Hopkins. Rally is an expert combat shooter and marksman with an array of weapons, as well as a brilliant driver. May is an explosives expert, knowing the inner workings of and many uses of all manner of explosive devices. Teenage ex-burglar and lock-picker Misty Brown later joins the team and there is also Becky Farrah, a top, if expensive, source of information on underworld activity.

Bounty hunting has of course led Rally to make many enemies, most notably Gray, the leader of gangsters whose use of armaments, including bombs, has likened them to terrorists; and Goldie Musou, a leading figure in the Mafia who uses drugs to manipulate people to the point that they can be brainwashed into killing their nearest and dearest. Bean Bandit, a man who specializes in delivering illegal goods, often features as an alternate ally or enemy—depending on the behavior of his clients, most of whom are being hunted by Rally.

== Production ==
After leaving anime production company Artmic to work as a comic artist, Kenichi Sonoda presented some of his story concepts and illustrations to Kodansha. These did not impress the editors but an illustration of two girls caught the attention of one of them, who suggested Sonoda develop a concept for it. Sonoda stated in an interview that the drawing was the genesis for the series. At the time Sonoda did not have any plans for the illustration but decided to expand his Riding Bean concept into a developed story. Due to licensing issues, Sonoda was originally unable to use the Riding Bean concept or character around the time he was creating Gunsmith Cats. However, during the run of the series the rights were returned to him and he added Bean Bandit into the series. Although Sonoda was a fan of the Japanese police drama series Taiyō ni Hoero!, he decided the show did not fit his preferred Western style. The story is influenced by American gun-action movies such as The French Connection and The Blues Brothers.

Sonoda chose the Shelby GT500 as Rally's car after realising that the cars in driving movies from the 70s were often Ford Mustangs. He researched the various models and selected the GT500 because it was the most powerful rather than any attraction to the car itself. When drawing guns, Sonoda would use a combination of magazines and his own replicas.

Character names were taken from American TV shows such as Bewitched and The Fugitive. The character of Minnie-May was the result of a compromise between Sonoda and the publisher.

== Media ==
=== Manga ===
Written and illustrated by Kenichi Sonoda, Gunsmith Cats was serialized in Kodansha's seinen manga magazine Monthly Afternoon from December 25, 1990, (Note: Debuted in the magazine's February 1991 issue, released on December 25, 1990.) to April 25, 1997. (Note: Finished in the magazine's June 1997 issue, released on April 25, 1997.) Kodansha collected its 75 chapters in eight tankōbon volumes, released from December 16, 1991, to July 23, 1997.

The series was adapted for publication in English by Studio Proteus and published by Dark Horse. Chapters were initially released as individual issues on a monthly basis from May 1, 1995, until August 15, 2001. Their release completely removed a scene where Minnie May performs oral sex on a man and another had blood stains on a bed removed, this censorship was done with the approval of Kenichi Sonoda. The individual chapters were then collected into nine trade paperback volumes between October 1, 1996, and February 13, 2002. The series began serialization in the British magazine Manga Mania from September 1996.

A four-volume omnibus edition of the series, Gunsmith Cats Revised Edition was published in Japan between July 22, 2005, and October 21, 2005. The fourth volume includes the manga and "making of" materials of Riding Bean and Sonoda's early sketches and notes. This edition was then published in English by Dark Horse between March 14, 2007, and December 19, 2007. The English edition used the original Japanese format of reading from right to left for the first time in its English publication. It was sold shrink-wrapped and with an 18+ Mature warning on the cover.

A sequel series, titled Gunsmith Cats Burst, was serialized in Monthly Afternoon from July 24, 2004, (Note: Debuted in the magazine's September 2004 issue, released on July 24, 2004.) to September 25, 2008. (Note: Finished in the magazine's November 2008 issue, released on September 25, 2008.) Kodansha collected its chapters in five tankōbon volumes, released in Japan between June 23, 2005, and November 21, 2008. The English edition was published by Dark Horse between May 2, 2007, and April 14, 2010.

In July 2024, Dark Horse announced that it would republish Gunsmith Cats in a new omnibus edition, with publication to begin the following year. Three omnibus volumes were released from March 4 to December 2, 2025. Dark Horse also announced in May 2025 that it would republish the sequel, Gunsmith Cats Burst, in a two-volume omnibus edition. The first and second volumes were released on February 17 and April 28, 2026, respectively.

==== Volumes ====
No.	Release date	ISBN
1	December 16, 1991	978-4-06-314039-2
1. "Feeding Trouble"; 2. "Revolver Freak"; 3. "Bonnie and Clyde"; 4. "Hot Feeding"; 5. "Burst"; 6. "CZ75"; 7. "Hang Fire"; 8. "Misfire"
2	September 22, 1992	978-4-06-314047-7
9. "Jamming"; 10. "Muzzle & Edge"; 11. "Magnum Primer"; 12. "Sight In"; 13. "Hard Touch"; 14. "Wood Bullet"; 15. "Medical Shot"; 16. "Bean"
3	April 23, 1993	978-4-06-314060-6
17. "Hammerless"; 18. "Big Game"; 19. "SIG-SG550"; 20. "Lost"; 21. "Slide Stop"; 22. "Misty Brown"; 23. "Decoy"; 24. "Handicap"; 25. "Fast Burning"
4	January 22, 1994	978-4-06-314074-3
26. "Minnie-May"; 27. "Injection"; 28. "Bad Trip"; 29. "Psychedelic"; 30. "Roy"; 31. "Hammer Release"; 32. "Poison of the Scorpion"; 33. "Lost Game"; 34. "Cool Down"
5	February 23, 1995	978-4-06-314096-5
35. "Rolling Bean"; 36. "Sleeper"; 37. "V26"; 38. "Hot Motor"; 39. "White Out"; 40. "Missing Washington"; 41. "N.Y. Hit"; 42. "Crossfire"; 43. "Game Set"
6	November 22, 1995	978-4-06-314120-7
44. "Kidnap"; 45. "Mr. Smart"; 46. "Long Night"; 47. "Midnight Plus Four"; 48. "Fifty Caliber"; 49. "Jeena"; 50. "Bloody Rally"; 51. "9mm vs. 40mm"; 52. "Family"; 53. "Sweet Home"
7	October 23, 1996	978-4-06-314141-2
Intermission: "Becky's Report"; 54. "Goldy Returns"; 55. "Promotion"; 56. "Breakthrough"; 57. "Mr. V"; 58. "Father"; 59. "Iron Woman"; 60. "The Previous Night"; 61. "Suicide"; 62. "Father's 12-Gauge"; 63. "Hesitation"; 64. "Smokin' High"; 65. "Now, I'm Back"
8	July 23, 1997	978-4-06-314158-0
66. "Guns & Doses"; 67. "Wild Women"; 68. "Misty's Run"; 69. "'Key'"; 70. "Secret"; 71. "Numeral Matters"; 72. "Crisis"; 73. "On the Run"; 74. "Print...Out"; 75. "Birthday"

==== Dark Horse volumes ====
No.	Title	Release date	ISBN
1	Bonnie and Clyde	October 1, 1996	978-1-56971-215-3
2	Misfire	September 17, 1997	978-1-56971-253-5
3	The Return of Gray	April 15, 1998	978-1-56971-299-3
4	Goldie versus Misty	March 10, 1999	978-1-56971-371-6
5	Bad Trip	February 16, 2000	978-1-56971-442-3
6	Bean Bandit	June 21, 2000	978-1-56971-453-9
7	Kidnapped	March 7, 2001	978-1-56971-529-1
8	Mister V	October 10, 2001	978-1-56971-550-5
9	Misty's Run	February 13, 2002	978-1-56971-684-7

==== Gunsmith Cats Revised Edition volumes ====
No.	Original release date	Original ISBN	English release date	English ISBN
1	July 22, 2005	978-4-06-372039-6	March 14, 2007	978-1-59307-748-8
2	August 23, 2005	978-4-06-372051-8	May 30, 2007	978-1-59307-768-6
3	September 21, 2005	978-4-06-372065-5	September 5, 2007	978-1-59307-818-8
4	October 21, 2005	978-4-06-372085-3	December 19, 2007	978-1-59307-862-1

==== Gunsmith Cats Burst volumes ====
No.	Original release date	Original ISBN	English release date	English ISBN
1	June 23, 2005	978-4-06-314383-6	May 2, 2007	978-1-59307-750-1
Short Series #1; Short Series #2: "Gunsmith Cats Mini Theater HP (High Power)" (ガンスミス キャッツミニシアター HP(ハイパワー), Gansumisu Kyattsu Mini Shiatā Hai Pawā); Short Series #3: "Hidden Gun"; 1. "Burst"; 2. "Oasis"; 3. "Monroe Inn"; 4. "Muzzle to Muzzle"; 5. "Gimme More Slices of Take!"; 6. "Return"; 7. "Deal"
2	November 22, 2005	978-4-06-314396-6	July 4, 2007	978-1-59307-767-9
8. "Finding Shelby; 9. "Explosion; 10. "GT 500"; 11. "Shooting Range"; 12. "Breach of Contract"; 13. "Get Out of the Hospital"; 14. "Inrush"; 15. "The Price to Pay"; 16. "Mach 1 Cop"
3	September 22, 2006	978-4-06-314426-0	February 6, 2008	978-1-59307-803-4
17. "King Cobra"; 18. "How to Aim and Shoot"; 19. "The Money-Sucking Car"; 20. "The V8 Freaks"; 21. "The Dirty Cop"; 22. "Traffic Jam"; 23. "The Ambush"; 24. "RPG7"; 25. "The Standoff"; 26. "Stalled!"
4	October 23, 2007	978-4-06-314474-1	September 16, 2009	978-1-59582-395-3
27. "The Post-Ball Stories"; 28. "Chatting Away"; 29. "A Familiar Face from the Past"; 30. "Goldy"; 31. "The Scar's Memory"; 32. "Guard Goldy!"; 33. "One-Handed"; 34. "The Wounded Ones"; 35. "A Shootout in the Smoke"; 36. "Flashback?"; 37. "Lost Memory, Recovered Memory"; 38. "After the House Party"
5	November 21, 2008	978-4-06-314538-0	April 14, 2010	978-1-59582-464-6
39. "Minnie-May's Souvenirs"; 40. "Rehabilitation"; 41. "Becky Farrah"; 42. "Drug Trafficking"; 43. "Anything But Drugs"; 44. "Hao Shifu"; 45. "Lift the Ban"; 46. "Can't Back Up"; 47. "150 MPH Shake!"; 48. "Percy"; 49. "Misty's Determination"; 50. "Good Night"; 51. "Faces of Chicago"

=== Anime ===
A three-part original video animation anime adaptation was created. This adaptation is an original story for the characters but includes several references to the manga storyline.

No.	Title	Original release date	English release date
1	"Neutral Zone"	November 1, 1995	February 20, 1996 (NA) June 3, 1996 (UK)
Rally, May, and Becky are coerced by the Bureau of Alcohol, Tobacco, Firearms and Explosives (ATF) to investigate a gunrunning operation led by Jonathan Washington.
2	"Swing High!"	April 1, 1996	July 9, 1996 (NA), September 30, 1996 (UK)
A Russian contract killer and ex-KGB agent named Radinov assassinates Jonathan Washington. While the Gunsmith Cats are investigating a gun shipment in Michigan, Radinov tangles with them and kidnaps May, leading to a lengthy car chase.
3	"High Speed Edge"	September 1, 1996	January 21, 1997 (NA)
ATF agent Bill Collins discovers Radinov has connections with corrupt Illinois state senator Edward Haints (who is later exposed) and Rally finally kills Radinov in a game of cat and mouse.

The anime adaptation was directed by Takeshi Mori. Although Mori was interested in cars, he had no knowledge of guns and had made an effort to research them for the production. He made sure the story was interesting to prevent the anime from focusing only on the guns and cars. The music for the anime was composed by former Weather Report drummer, Peter Erskine. During production of the anime adaptation, members of the staff made several trips to Chicago to scout locations, including visits to a Gun Shop and a Police Academy. During these trips the staff were able to handle and fire real guns for research, something not possible in Japan with its gun laws. A Shelby Cobra GT-500 was recorded in Hollywood for sound effects purposes, and almost all of the other sound effects were recorded using Foley.

An anime comic that compiled the first two episodes of the series was published as one volume on August 23, 1996.

==== Release ====
The OVA was licensed by ADV Films who released the first episode in North America on February 20, 1996. There was a choice of either subtitled or dubbed VHS, as well as a bilingual Laserdisc. A special edition was also released of the subtitled version, along with a 40-minute making of documentary. ADV then chose the series for their first release in the United Kingdom. The first volume was released on June 3, 1996, as subtitled or dubbed VHS and also included the documentary.

The anime adaptation was broadcast on the Encore Action Channel in September 2000.

A DVD release of all 3 episodes and the making of special was released in North America on March 27, 2001, before being rereleased as part of ADV's "Essential" range with a lower price on April 13, 2004.

On December 3, 2017, AnimEigo announced that they acquired the license for Gunsmith Cats, and that they would host a Kickstarter campaign to produce a Blu-ray edition for the series. The Blu-ray shipped in 2019, with AnimEigo announcing that "the Gunsmith Cats Explosive Edition Kickstarter was our most successful yet."

=== Proposed film ===
In April 1999, producer Ben Myron revealed in an interview with Comics2Film that he will be developing Gunsmith Cats as a live action film written and directed by Kari Skogland. Myron was compelled to hire Skogland due to her directing on Men with Guns. No news or activity would come out since then.

== Reception ==
The series was nominated in the "Best American Adaptation of Foreign material" category of the 1997 Harvey Award.

In Manga: The Complete Guide, Jason Thompson is critical of Sonoda's depiction of women as "thin-hipped plastic toys with pubic hair" and some "frankly pedophilic" plot elements. However, he praises the "skilled storytelling" and describes the English localisation as "excellent".

Mike Crandol of Anime News Network was critical of the final volume Misty's Run, believing the previous volume would have been a better end and the "true climax" to the series. He highlights a lower quality of art in comparison to earlier volumes as a sign that Sonoda may have been losing interest in the series. However he notes that despite this, the story is still "smartly executed and action packed".

Manga Mania described the anime adaptation as "colourful, crazy stuff" and "a highly enjoyable feast". Comparing the manga and anime they noted that despite Sonoda's attention to the cars and weapons in the series, the setting feels more like a generic American town than Chicago. However they praised the attention given to the anime adaptation's more accurate portrayal of the city. In The Anime Encyclopedia, Jonathan Clements and Helen McCarthy call the adaptation "good fun" and observed the lighthearted approach to the series in comparison to the manga. They believe it deserved a version for TV. However they conclude that the low demand for pulp crime in the 1990s was a problem.

Mike Crandol of Anime News Network was largely positive about the anime adaptation but noted the simplified gunplay compared to the manga. He praised the attention ADV paid to the DVD package compared to their other titles and the quality of the English dub. In summary he called the anime adaptation "an excellent introductory piece of anime" due to the familiarity of the setting for those new to anime and called the adaptation a "solid piece of fun filmmaking". In another review on the Anime News Network, a reviewer praised the series for looking and sounding "like a gritty, grey suburb of modern Chicago," the impressive quality of the anime, action, and artwork. Raphael See of THEM Anime Reviews praised the series for delivering on "much of what its manga predecessor offers," having a "fairly intelligent story, smooth animation, furious action, and continued humor". He only complained that the series is too short, hoping that more will later be in production.
