= Wanna-Be's =

1986 Japanese direct-to-video animation

- Cover art of Wanna-Be's VHS release

ウォナビーズ
- Genre: Wrestling, Sci-Fi, Comedy
- Original video animation
- Directed by: Yasuo Hasegawa
- Produced by: Tōru Miura
- Written by: Toshimichi Suzuki
- Music by: Hiroshi Shinkawa
- Studio: AIC, Artmic, Movic
- Licensed by: Central Park Media; U.S. Manga Corps
- Released: December 25, 1986
- Runtime: 45 minutes

Wanna-Be's (ウォナビーズ) is a 1986 Japanese direct-to-video animation written by Toshimichi Suzuki. Ken'ichi Sonoda created the character designs of the animated version.

== Voice actors ==
- Eriko Hara as Miki Morita
- Miki Takahashi as Eri Kazama
- Shūichi Ikeda as Tetsuma Kidō
- Akio Nojima as Oki Sonoda
- Eiko Yamada as Bloody Matsuki
- Urara Takano as Buster Horiguchi
- Shōzō Iizuka as Dr. Sawada
- Yūsaku Yara as Joe Taguchi
- Demon Kogure as himself

== Production staff ==
- Director: Yasuo Hasegawa
- Writer: Toshimichi Suzuki
- Composer: Hiroshi Shinkawa
- Art Director: Masazumi Matsumiya
- Character Designers: Yoshiharu Shimizu, Ken'ichi Sonoda
- Mechanical Designer: Shinji Aramaki
- Monster Designer: Hideki Kakinuma
- Animation Director: Yoshiharu Shimizu
- Assistant Animation Director: Masanori Nagashima
- Storyboards: Yasuo Hasegawa, Hiroki Hayashi, Jun'ichi Yokoyama
- Sound Director: Noriyoshi Matsuura
- Director of Photography: Masazumi Okino
- Producers: Eiji Kishi, Yutaka Takahashi
- Animation Producers: Mitsuhisa Hida, Nagateru Katō, Tōru Miura
- Production Companies: AIC Animate Film, Artmic, Movic

== Music ==
- "Adam's Apple" (アダムの林檎) by Seikima-II (insert song)
- "Music (I Love You ga Kasurete)" by Saori Saitō (ending theme)
