= Kenichi Sonoda =

Manga artist and animation character designer (born 1962)

- Born: 13 December 1962 (age 63); Kumamoto, Kumamoto Prefecture
- Occupations: Manga artist Character Designer
- Notable work: Gunsmith Cats

Kenichi Sonoda (園田 健一, Sonoda Ken'ichi; born 13 December 1962) is a Japanese manga artist and animation character designer.

== Professional career ==
Born in Kumamoto, Kumamoto Prefecture, Sonoda moved to Tokyo in 1984, at the age of 21, and began work at Artmic, an anime studio. During this time, he worked on Bubblegum Crisis, producing the original Knight Saber character designs. He also worked on Gall Force, for which he did the original character designs.

He worked at Artmic until 1991, when he began work on the manga series Gunsmith Cats. Gunsmith Cats is one of Sonoda's best known works, being both a Harvey and Tezuka award nominee. Sonoda concluded Gunsmith Cats' run in 1997, when he put the comic on hiatus, and began work on Cannon God Exaxxion. In 2004, after finishing Cannon God Exaxxion, he returned to work on Gunsmith Cats, with the follow-up sequel, Gunsmith Cats Burst.

He is currently the 19th head of the wagashi confectionery shop "Sonoda-ya" in Kumamoto, established in 1582. Sonoda created a new product, its first in 115 years, by adding lemon peels to his family's existing chōsen-ame candies and providing his own bishōjo illustrations for the packaging.

In 2024, Sonoda was a recipient of the Inkpot Award at the annual San Diego Comic Con.

== Personal life ==
Sonoda is a self-confessed gun fanatic, owning several replica guns.

== Works ==
=== Manga ===
- Riding Bean (1988–1989; cancelled with the magazine Monthly Comic Noizy (月刊コミックノイズィ, Gekkan Komikku Noizui))
- Gunsmith Cats (1990–1997)
- Cannon God Exaxxion (1997–2004)
- Gunsmith Cats Burst (2004–2008)
- Bullet the Wizard (2010–2012)

=== Animation ===
- Wanna-Be's (1986)—character concept design
- Gall Force: First Story Arc (1986)—character design
- Gall Force: Rhea Arc (1989)—character design
- Gall Force: Earth Chapter Arc (1989)—character design
- Gall Force: New Era Arc (1991)—character design
- Bubblegum Crisis (1987–1991)—character and mecha design
- Royal Space Force: The Wings of Honneamise (1987)—production design
- Riding Bean (1989)—original story, character design
- Bubblegum Crash (1991)—character design
- Otaku no Video (1991)—character design
- Gunsmith Cats (1995–1996)—original story, character design
- Idol Janshi Suchie-Pai (1996)—original character design
- Solty Rei (2005)—conceptual design

=== Video games ===
- Sol Bianca
- Suchie-Pai The Idol Fighter series (1993–ongoing)
- Neon Genesis Evangelion Eva to Yukai na Nakamitachi Datsuihokankeikaku
- Temho Painyan
