= Naruto: Shippuden season 6 =

Naruto: Shippuden
- Season 6
- Season 6 Cover
- No. of episodes: 31

Release
- Original network: TV Tokyo
- Original release: June 11, 2009 – January 14, 2010

Season chronology
- ← Previous; Season 5 Next → Season 7

The sixth season of the Naruto: Shippuden anime series is directed by Hayato Date, and produced by Studio Pierrot and TV Tokyo. They are based on Part II for Masashi Kishimoto's manga series. The sixth season aired from June 2009 to January 2010 on TV Tokyo. The season follows Sasuke Uchiha absorbing Orochimaru's power and taking revenge against his older brother Itachi Uchiha to avenge the death of their clan, while Naruto Uzumaki and his friends pursuits Sasuke. It also features two arcs focusing on the background stories for Kakashi Hatake and Jiraiya. The season is referred to by its DVDs as the chapter of Master's Prophecy and Vengeance (師の予言と復讐, Shi no Yogen to Fukushū) released by Aniplex.

The seven DVD volumes were released in Japan between January 13, 2010, and July 7, 2011. Limited edition of Seventh DVD of "Master's Prophecy and Vengeance" comes with special DVD Behind the Scenes of Uchiha containing interview mixed with footage from episodes. Episodes 119 and 120, detailing the story of Kakashi and Obito Uchiha, were released on separate disc on December 16, 2009, under the title of Kakashi Chronicles: Boys' Life on the Battlefield (カカシ外伝～戦場のボーイズライフ～, Kakashi Gaiden ~Senjō no Bōizu Raifu~).

The season aired on Neon Alley from January 12 to February 4, 2013. The season would make its English television debut on Adult Swim's Toonami programming block and premiere from May 22, 2016, to January 29, 2017.

The season uses six musical themes: two opening themes and four ending themes. "Hotaru no Hikari" (ホタルノヒカリ; "Glow of Fireflies") by Ikimono-gakari is used as the opening theme for episodes 113 to 128, continuing its usage from the previous season. It was replaced by "Sign" by Flow for episodes 129 to 143. The first ending theme is "Shinkokyū" (深呼吸; "Deep Breath") by Super Beaver used for the first three episodes of the season. "My Answer" by Seamo was used as the ending theme for episodes 116 to 128. It was replaced in episode 129 by "Omae Dattanda" (おまえだったんだ; "It Was You") by Kishidan and ran until episode 141. It was replaced by "For You" by Azu for the remaining episodes. The third feature film, Naruto Shippūden The Movie: Inheritors of the Will of Fire, based on the series, was released on August 1, 2009. The broadcast versions for episodes 119 to 124 include scenes from the film in the opening themes, while still retaining the music "Hotaru no Hikari" by Ikimono-gakari.

== Episodes ==
No. overall	No. in season	Title	Directed by	Written by	Original release date	English air date
Master's Prophecy and Vengeance
113	1	"The Serpent's Pupil (Note: (of the eye))" Transliteration: "Daija no dōkō" (Japanese: 大蛇の瞳孔)	Masayuki Matsumoto	Masahiro Hikokubo	June 11, 2009	January 12, 2013
The time for the Reanimation jutsu is coming and Orochimaru's body is reaching its limit. Orochimaru and Kabuto discuss Sasuke Uchiha's growth during the Chunin Exams, and recall how the Third Hokage took away Orochimaru's ability to use jutsu. Orochimaru also tells Kabuto that he wants Sasuke's body. After practicing his ninja techniques, Sasuke makes a sudden attack on Orochimaru, having nothing else to learn from him. He attacks using his Chidori, criticising Orochimaru for his experiments that waste innocent lives, and how he targeted the youngest of the Uchiha clan in order to attain the Sharingan, since he could not go up against Itachi. Orochimaru reveals his true form, a giant white snake, and makes his attempt to take Sasuke's body. Sasuke uses his Cursed Seal of Heaven to counter it. Meanwhile, Tsunade discovers the Three-Tails is taken by Akatsuki.
114	2	"Eye of the Hawk"; Transliteration: "Taka no hitomi" (Japanese: 鷹の瞳)	Hiroshi Kimura	Masahiro Hikokubo	June 18, 2009	January 12, 2013
Orochimaru reminisces about the memories of his past, and how he became interested in reanimation and the Sharingan. Tragedies such as the loss of his student Nawaki – Tsunade's younger brother – led him to detest the fragility of life, and how people had so much unused power. He grew to realise that if he were to stand a chance at learning every jutsu, he would need to be immortal, and would need a Sharingan. He joined the Akatsuki and attempted to attack their new recruit Itachi, who had just killed the entire Uchiha clan. However, Itachi trapped him in a genjutsu. Orochimaru also recalls how the Third Hokage and his former teammate Jiraiya, attempted to reason with him, but to no avail. Back in the present, Orochimaru begins the ritual to take over Sasuke's body, within a dimension of his own. Later on, Kabuto arrives to see Sasuke standing over Orochimaru's snake corpse, and from the Sharingan, he finds out what happened: Orochimaru had failed in possessing Sasuke's body, as Sasuke manages to reverse Orochimaru's Jutsu and absorbs Orochimaru into his body, overpowering Orochimaru's dimension with his own willpower. Sasuke then leaves his hideout to find his own path to avenge Itachi, as a shocked Kabuto watches on. Meanwhile, Naruto, Tsunade, Jiraiya, and Itachi all watch the blood orange sunset – a bad omen – from their respective locations.
115	3	"Zabuza's Blade"; Transliteration: "Zabuza no daitō" (Japanese: 再不斬の大刀)	Shuu Watanabe	Shin Yoshida	June 25, 2009	January 12, 2013
Sasuke frees Suigetsu Hozuki from his hydro capsule, and requests his services. Suigetsu responds that he would gladly give them, on condition that he helps him find Zabuza's sword. They fail to find the blade at his grave but learn that it is in the possession of a man named Tenzen Daikoku. Sasuke uses Tenzen's guarded fortress to test Suigetsu's combat abilities, and Suigetsu gets the blade without much effort. As promised, Suigetsu teams up with Sasuke and goes with him to the Southern hideout.
116	4	"Guardian of the Iron Wall"; Transliteration: "Teppeki no bannin" (Japanese: 鉄壁の番人)	Kunitoshi Okajima	Yasuyuki Suzuki	July 2, 2009	January 12, 2013
The second member of Sasuke's team is revealed to be a woman named Karin. After Sasuke and Suigetsu arrive at the Southern Hideout, Sasuke requests that Karin comes with them. Despite her hesitations and quarrels with Suigetsu, Karin ultimately accepts after remembering her very first encounter with Sasuke. Sasuke orders Suigetsu to release the prisoners, and after that, they set off to recruit the final member of the team – Jugo.
117	5	"Jugo of the North Hideout"; Transliteration: "Kita ajito no Jūgo" (Japanese: 北アジトの重吾)	Yuki Arie	Shin Yoshida	July 9, 2009	January 14, 2013
While approaching the hideout, Karin explains that Jugo has abnormal homicidal impulses, and is the original carrier of the enzyme used to create Orochimaru's Curse Mark. Upon arriving there, Sasuke and his team are attacked by a massive number of rampaging prisoners, who they manage to suppress. Later on, Sasuke is attacked by Jugo, but he expresses that he only wishes to talk with him. In the meantime, Naruto Uzumaki and Sakura Haruno find out that Sasuke has killed Orochimaru.
118	6	"Formation!"; Transliteration: "Kessei!" (Japanese: 結成!)	Kiyomu Fukuda	Shin Yoshida	July 23, 2009	January 14, 2013
While fighting with Sasuke, Jugo remembers how he met his friend – Kimimaro, and how he vowed to counteract Jugo's bipolar murderous urges. Jugo refuses to join Sasuke since he believes that without Kimimaro, he could potentially kill others. After being told that Kimimaro died for the sake of retrieving Sasuke to be Orochimaru's new vessel, Jugo agrees to go with Sasuke. Due to a conversation with Kimimaro in the past, Jugo believes that Kimimaro lives on within Sasuke. After informing his newly formed team that his goal is to kill Itachi Uchiha of the Akatsuki, Sasuke names their group "Hebi" ["Snake"]. In the meantime, Naruto decides to go after Itachi in hopes of finding Sasuke.
Kakashi Chronicles: Boys' Life on the Battlefield
119	7	"Kakashi Chronicles ~Boys' Life on the Battlefield~ Part 1"; Transliteration: "Kakashi Gaiden ~Senjō no bōizuraifu~ Zenpen" (Japanese: カカシ外伝～戦場のボーイズライフ～前編)	Yasumi Mikamoto	Junki Takegami	July 30, 2009	January 14, 2013
During the Third Great Ninja War seventeen years ago, a 13-year-old Kakashi Hatake is just promoted to Jonin with his mentor, the future Fourth Hokage Minato Namikaze, and Rin Nohara giving him gifts. Only Kakashi's other teammate and rival, Obito Uchiha, forgot to bring a present. Soon after, Minato tells his students of their mission to destroy Kannabi Bridge so they can cripple the ninja from the Hidden Stone Village. Along the way, Team Minato is ambushed by a Hidden Stone ninja named Mahiru with Kakashi seeing it as an opportunity to try his newly developed jutsu: the Chidori. However, with Kakashi's attack unable to land a hit on his target and Obito is too frightened to fight, Minato personally eliminates Mahiru using his teleportation jutsu. Minato then tells Kakashi not to use the Chidori due to its vertigo effect while criticizing Obito for not being able to act on his words. That night, unable to sleep, Obito learns from Minato that Kakashi's mindset of being a stickler for the rules, is the result of his father Sakumo Hatake – the White Fang of the Leaf who was once feared more than the Legendary Sannin – being ostracized and driven to suicide for putting his teammates ahead of the mission, which is against Shinobi law. The next day, left in charge as Minato heads off, Kakashi leads Rin and Obito into enemy territory before they are attacked by the Hidden Stone ninja Kakko and Taiseki who abduct Rin. Having accepted Kakashi as leader prior, Obito punches him for putting the mission before Rin as he runs off to save her. When Kakashi tries to stop him by telling him what happens to ninja who break the rules, Obito says he does know, and that's why he believes that Kakashi's father was a true hero, and comments that those who break the rules may be scum, but those who abandoned their comrades are worse than scum before he leaves.
120	8	"Kakashi Chronicles ~Boys' Life on the Battlefield~ Part 2"; Transliteration: "Kakashi Gaiden ~Senjō no bōizuraifu~ Kōhen" (Japanese: カカシ外伝～戦場のボーイズライフ～後編)	Masahiro Takada	Junki Takegami	July 30, 2009	January 14, 2013
After leaving an impression on Kakashi, Obito finds the cave where Rin is being held in before being attacked by Taiseki. When Kakashi arrives in time to save him from being killed, losing his left eye in the process, Obito musters courage and takes out Taiseki with his awakened Sharingan. Kakashi and Obito then proceed to rescue Rin, but Kakko causes the cave to collapse in on them. With rocks falling all around the Konoha ninja, Obito threw Kakashi out of the way of a falling rock, which landed on him instead, and crushed the entire right side of his body. Knowing his death is certain, remembering that he still owes his teammate a gift, Obito has Rin transplant his left eye into Kakashi's eye socket. Seeing Kakashi cry over how things turned out, Obito assures him that is a great ninja and asks him to protect Rin. Once Obito's Sharingan is transplanted into him, Kakashi emerges from the rubble and uses a perfected Chidori to kill Kakko. However, more Hidden Stone ninja arrive and cause the cave to collapse further with Obito apparently crushed as Kakashi and Rin are forced to leave him behind. After being saved by Minato, the surviving members of Team Minato lament over losing Obito before they complete their mission of destroying the Kannabi Bridge – a legendary moment in the Third Great Ninja War.
Master's Prophecy and Vengeance
121	9	"Assemble"; Transliteration: "Ugokidasumono-tachi" (Japanese: 動き出すものたち)	Masayuki Matsumoto	Yuka Miyata	August 6, 2009	January 19, 2013
After capturing the Four-Tails's Jinchūriki, Roshi, Itachi, and Kisame are informed by the Akatsuki leader of Orochimaru's death. They are then warned about Sasuke's movements and that he may be coming after Itachi. Later, after the Three-Tails and the Four-Tails are sealed, Deidara and Tobi set out to target either Naruto or Sasuke. Meanwhile, Hebi gathers supplies at an abandoned Uchiha warehouse. Naruto dines with Jiraiya at Ichiraku, while Kakashi formulates a strategy, and assembles a team, to capture Itachi. Kakashi assembles Team Kurenai, led by himself, to set out with Team Kakashi, led by Yamato, to capture Itachi.
122	10	"The Hunt"; Transliteration: "Tansaku" (Japanese: 探索)	Hiroshi Kimura	Yuka Miyata	August 13, 2009	January 19, 2013
As Naruto and the others set off with Kakashi's ninja hounds, Hebi scatters to look for information on Itachi. Sakura walks past Karin as Hinata, Yamato and Naruto run into Kabuto, who gives them a book with information on the Akatsuki. He then reveals that in a search to find himself, he has transplanted Orochimaru's remains into himself. He then leaves to track down Sasuke. Elsewhere, Sasuke is confronted by Tobi and Deidara and prepares for a battle with them.
123	11	"Clash!"; Transliteration: "Gekitotsu!" (Japanese: 激突!)	Toshiyuki Tsuru	Toshiyuki Tsuru	August 20, 2009	January 19, 2013
Sasuke asks where Itachi is and slices through Tobi, as Deidara retreats to a distance. Tobi gets back up unharmed as Deidara retaliates with his chakra-level 1 (C1) explosives. Sasuke escapes with a simple substitution jutsu forcing Deidara to use one of his C2 creations, the C2 Dragon. Working with Tobi, they forced Sasuke to use the Curse Mark. In the end, Sasuke defeats their combos, and Deidara is left with no choice but to use his trump card that was meant for Itachi, the C4 Karura.
124	12	"Art"; Transliteration: "Geijutsu" (Japanese: 芸術)	Kunitoshi Okajima	Junki Takegami	August 27, 2009	January 19, 2013
As Deidara's C4 Karura detonates, Sasuke perishes. Believing to have won, Deidara drops his guard, only to be pierced by Sasuke's Chidori. Deidara uses a clay clone and attacks Sasuke again, but Sasuke is able to break out of the C4 Karura. After being asked how he had survived, Sasuke reveals that he was never harmed and that Deidara was under his genjutsu, and that he noticed Deidara used Earth Style hand signs to mould his detonating clay, which was inferior to Sasuke's Lightning Style Chidori. Deidara recalls how we was defeated by Itachi and recruited to the Akatsuki as a result of Itachi's Sharingan, giving him a hatred for such eyes. Deidara tries to kill Sasuke but is misled by his Sharingan again. Both combatants collapse and Sasuke deactivates his Sharingan. Angered at being mocked, Deidara unveils his final attack, an explosion of art, where he turns himself into a living bomb and detonates himself in an attempt to kill Sasuke.
125	13	"Disappearance"; Transliteration: "Shōshitsu" (Japanese: 消失)	Yuki Kinoshita	Yasuyuki Suzuki	September 3, 2009	January 21, 2013
Upon noticing the blast, Suigetsu summons Manda and finds out that Sasuke had used him, alongside a transportation jutsu, to escape. Unable to survive, Manda dies from his wounds. Meanwhile, Zetsu informs the remaining Akatsuki of the deaths of Deidara, Tobi, and Sasuke during their battle. After the meeting, Itachi tells Kisame that Sasuke is not dead. Naruto and the others get to the crater caused by Deidara's explosion, and using Kiba's tracking skills they begin to track down Sasuke's scent to where he is resting with his team. Meanwhile, the Akatsuki leader is revealed to be Pain. He and his partner, Konan, are then ordered to capture the Nine-Tailed Jinchūriki by a mysterious man, Tobi, who claims to wield the true power of the Sharingan, and reveals his identity to be Madara Uchiha.
126	14	"Twilight"; Transliteration: "Tasogare" (Japanese: 黄昏)	Kiyomu Fukuda	Masahiro Hikokubo	September 10, 2009	January 21, 2013
Jiraiya arrives in Konohagakure and tells Tsunade that he has information regarding Pain's location. In the meantime, Karin senses that they're being followed by the Hidden Leaf Shinobi and asks Jugo to help her throw off their pursuers. As Hebi departs, Naruto encounters Itachi and tells him he sees Sasuke as a sworn brother. After talking, Itachi departs, having more pressing matters to attend to. Meanwhile, Jiraiya and Tsunade share a drink, and discuss how the Akatsuki leader is based in the insular Hidden Rain Village, currently embroiled in a civil war with Pain leading one of the sides, and how the village has been the battleground for larger surrounding lands. Jiraiya reminisces about his former student and Naruto's father, Minato Namikaze and how he quickly rose to become the Fourth Hokage. Speaking of future Hokage candidates, Tsunade likens Naruto to his mother, Kushina Uzumaki. Jiraiya warns Tsunade about the Foundation before Jiraiya departs for the Hidden Rain Village, to confirm Pain's location in a life-threatening mission.
Tales of a Gutsy Ninja ~Jiraiya Ninja Scroll
127	15	"Tales of a Gutsy Ninja ~Jiraiya Ninja Scroll~ Part 1"; Transliteration: "Dokonjō ninden ~Jiraiya ninpōchō~ Zenpen" (Japanese: ド根性忍伝～自来也忍法帖～前編)	Shuu Watanabe	Junki Takegami	September 24, 2009	January 21, 2013
Back in the times of the Third Hokage's youth, the young, soon-to-be Sannin are assigned to Hiruzen Sarutobi's platoon. Being fascinated by Sarutobi's summoning jutsu, Jiraiya tries it himself, only to teleport himself to Mount Myoboku. There, Jiraiya trains under Fukusaku and meets the Great Lord Elder who has a vision of his future. Afterwards, Jiraiya goes on a journey with the goal of fulfilling his destiny, meeting many strange characters on the way.
128	16	"Tales of a Gutsy Ninja ~Jiraiya Ninja Scroll~ Part 2"; Transliteration: "Dokonjō ninden ~Jiraiya ninpōchō~ Kōhen" (Japanese: ド根性忍伝～自来也忍法帖～後編)	Shigeharu Takahashi	Junki Takegami	September 24, 2009	January 21, 2013
Due to the Second Great Ninja War, Jiraiya, Tsunade and Orochimaru are sent to the Hidden Rain Village, where they are named the "Legendary Sannin" by Hanzo of the Great Salamander. While in the village, Jiraiya meets with Yahiko, Nagato and Konan who request help from him. Jiraiya accepts and proceeds to train them before returning home. He is later informed that all three children were killed. Some time later, Jiraiya trains Minato, who together with Kushina, names their unborn son "Naruto" after the main character in Jiraiya's first book.
Master's Prophecy and Vengeance
129	17	"Infiltrate! The Village Hidden in the Rain"; Transliteration: "Sennyū! Amegakure no Sato" (Japanese: 潜入! 雨隠れの里)	Yuusuke Onoda	Shin Yoshida	October 8, 2009	January 26, 2013
Jiraiya successfully infiltrates the Village Hidden in the Rain, where he wanders around town and speaks to the inhabitants about their leader, Pain. Unsuccessful in gathering information, he captures two lower ninja of the city in a frog's stomach, who ends up telling him that the mysterious Pain had defeated the former leader of Rain, Hanzo, whom the Sannin together couldn't defeat. Meanwhile, Pain orders Konan to search for the intruder and she folds herself into origami butterflies.
130	18	"The Man Who Became God"; Transliteration: "Kami to natta Otoko" (Japanese: 神となった男)	Hiroshi Kimura	Shin Yoshida	October 8, 2009	January 26, 2013
Jiraiya summons Gerotora and talks with it about how he's going on a battle and to be ready. He also says that the Nine-tails attack was not a natural disaster, it was summoned by someone. Jiraiya revealed that it was summoned by an Uchiha and it was Madara Uchiha. Pain changes into a new body and tells Konan to confront Jiraiya, their former sensei. Pain soon arrives himself and discusses his personal ideology and the Akatsuki's goals with Jiraiya. He reveals that the collection of the Tailed Beasts is in order to create a Forbidden Jutsu weapon that will be able to destroy entire nations in an instant, so that the world will be able to "mature" and develop an aversion for war. Pain then summons a crab to attack Jiraiya, which is defeated before Jiraiya summons a giant frog named Gamaken.
131	19	"Honored Sage Mode!"; Transliteration: "Hatsudō! Sennin Mōdo" (Japanese: 発動! 仙人モード)	Akitoshi Yokoyama	Yasuyuki Suzuki	October 15, 2009	January 26, 2013
Jiraiya and Gamaken begin their battle against Pain, who has hidden himself using camouflage. Jiraiya uses a barrier jutsu to try and find him while preparing to enter Sage Mode. Meanwhile, Pain assaults Jiraiya with a barrage of animal summons, such as a multiplying dog, a rhino, a bird and a bull, and Jiraiya finally enters in Sage Mode, after sending Gamaken back home. He summons Lord Fukasaku and Lady Shima, who find Pain and destroy his chameleon. Pain then summons two more bodies.
132	20	"In Attendance, the Six Paths of Pain"; Transliteration: "Pein Rikudō, kenzan" (Japanese: ペイン六道、見参)	Fujiaki Asari	Yuka Miyata	October 22, 2009	January 26, 2013
Jiraiya blinds one of the new Pains, and Lord Fukasaku suspects that all three share the same eyes and vision, while Jiraiya realizes that each of the bodies has only one specific purpose. Jiraiya stalls for time while Lord Fukasaku and Lady Shima prepare a powerful genjutsu to defeat the bodies and are successful in doing so. As Jiraiya leaves, another Pain ambushes Jiraiya destroying his left arm. As Jiraiya looks up he sees six Pains, including the three that were killed. He stands horrified wondering just who and what Pain is.
133	21	"The Tale of Jiraiya the Gallant"; Transliteration: "Jiraiya gōketsu monogatari" (Japanese: 自来也豪傑物語)	Masaaki Kumagai	Junki Takegami	October 29, 2009	January 28, 2013
Jiraiya goes into deep panic thinking Pain is either Yahiko or Nagato, as Pain possesses Rinnegan which Nagato had and he appears as Yahiko. Jiraiya kills one of the Pains only to realize he's fought him before. Lady Shima leaves on Jiraiya's request before Jiraiya realizes that he has met all of the Pains before. Jiraiya figures out who Pain is but it is unable to relay the message as Pain's attack crushes Jiraiya's throat. As he begins to die, he remembers Naruto's determination and forces himself awake, where he writes a message on Lord Fukasaku's back. Pain then blasts him into the ocean, where Jiraiya dies happy, sure that Naruto is the Child of Prophecy.
134	22	"Banquet Invitation"; Transliteration: "Utage e no izanai" (Japanese: 宴への誘い)	Kiyomu Fukuda	Masahiro Hikokubo	November 5, 2009	January 28, 2013
While Naruto's team continues their search for Sasuke, Sasuke meets Itachi in a cave, fights an illusion, and is told to come to the Uchiha hideout. On their way, Sasuke's team is intercepted by a shadow clone of Naruto, which Sasuke easily dispatches. The real Naruto quickly sends his team after Sasuke, but they are stopped by Tobi. Meanwhile, Team Hebi is confronted by Kisame who won't let anyone but Sasuke pass. Sasuke carries on while his team, specifically Suigetsu, faces Kisame.
135	23	"The Longest Moment"; Transliteration: "Nagaki toki no naka de..." (Japanese: 長き瞬間の中で...)	Atsushi Nigorikawa	Shin Yoshida	November 19, 2009	January 28, 2013
As Sasuke approaches the Uchiha hideout, Itachi recalls his past with his little brother and the assassination that he carried out after joining the Anbu and being under close watch for his suspicious activities. When Sasuke arrives, he declares that his eyes have shown him Itachi's death and the fated battle between the two brothers begins. Itachi's illusions deceive Sasuke as he explains that he conspired with Madara Uchiha, the Leaf's founder and the first to awaken the Mangekyo Sharingan, when he killed their clan.
136	24	"The Light & Dark of the Mangekyo Sharingan"; Transliteration: "Mangekyō Sharingan no hikari to yami" (Japanese: 万華鏡写輪眼の光と闇)	Shigeharu Takahashi	Yasuyuki Suzuki	November 19, 2009	January 28, 2013
As Zetsu watches on, Itachi explains to Sasuke the real secret behind the Mangekyo Sharingan, and the history of the Uchiha clan. Besides being able to tame the Nine-Tailed Fox, the Mangekyo will eventually rob the user of his eyesight and the only way to overcome this obstacle is to steal the Sharingan eyes of that person's sibling. Sasuke retaliates against Itachi's assaults, but he is eventually pinned to a wall and has one of his eyes seemingly stolen by Itachi.
137	25	"Amaterasu!" (Japanese: 天照)	Yuusuke Onoda	Yuka Miyata	November 26, 2009	February 2, 2013
As Itachi moves in to take his remaining eye, Sasuke manages to overcome the Tsukuyomi he was placed under. With Genjutsu now useless, the brothers switch to Ninjutsu, with Sasuke gaining the upper hand. Itachi then unleashes Amaterasu, however, Sasuke uses a Substitution Jutsu to escape the flames. Itachi berates Sasuke, claiming he now has no chakra left, but Sasuke reveals that he had come prepared, and has one last technique left that would make his dream of killing Itachi a reality.
138	26	"The End"; Transliteration: "Shūen" (Japanese: 終焉)	Masahiko Murata	Masahiro Hikokubo	December 3, 2009	February 2, 2013
Sasuke summons his ultimate Lightning Jutsu, Kirin, and directs it at Itachi. However, Itachi rises again and reveals his final Mangekyo technique, Susano'o. With Sasuke weakened, Orochimaru is able to break free from his restrictive chakra and attempts to take Sasuke's body. However, Itachi retaliates by sealing him away into another dimension, ridding Sasuke from the Cursed Seal of Heaven and the own Orochimaru. Out of jutsu, Sasuke is left at Itachi's mercy, but at the last second, Itachi taps Sasuke on his forehead and collapses onto the ground, dead.
139	27	"The Mystery of Tobi"; Transliteration: "Tobi no nazo" (Japanese: トビの謎)	Hiroshi Kimura	Shin Yoshida	December 10, 2009	February 2, 2013
The Leaf Ninja continue to fight Tobi, but all of their attacks manage to phase right through him. Shino manages to trap Tobi with a beetle sphere but Tobi uses a teleportation jutsu in order to escape. Zetsu arrives to inform Tobi the outcome of the Uchiha match, the Leaf Ninja overhears, and Madara drops his goofy persona in order to leave the fight; revealing his Sharingan, and to collect the brothers' bodies. Sasuke wakes up in a cave and Madara approaches him, introducing himself. An Amaterasu is unleashed from Sasuke's left eye turned Itachi's Mangekyo Sharingan, but Madara recovers from it and mentions how in-depth Itachi's plans were. Sasuke asks what he means, and Madara tells him the truth that Itachi was trying to protect him.
140	28	"Fate"; Transliteration: "Innen" (Japanese: 因縁)	Minoru Yamaoka	Yasuyuki Suzuki	December 17, 2009	February 2, 2013
Madara tells Sasuke about the real history of the Uchiha and how they and their rivals, the Senju clan, led by the future First Hokage, Hashirama Senju, once made a pact to unite the two clans as one and to make the first hidden village, Konoha. Afterwards, the Senju spied on and secretly discriminated against the Uchiha, forcing Madara, their leader, to leave and try to exact revenge upon them. Years later, the Uchiha were planning a coup d'etat on the village and Itachi was chosen by the village leaders to spy on the clan from the inside.
141	29	"Truth"; Transliteration: "Shinjitsu" (Japanese: 真実)	Shuu Watanabe	Yuka Miyata	December 24, 2009	February 4, 2013
Madara continues the by informing the truth about Itachi to Sasuke that Itachi was a double-agent who was assigned to leak intel on the Uchiha back to the village. He then contacted Madara to help him undertake his mission of exterminating the Uchiha clan. They succeeded in their mission, although Itachi couldn't bring himself to kill Sasuke. Some time later, Sasuke reminisces on Itachi's final words to him, before breaking down into tears. Heartbroken and vengeful, he changes his team's name to Taka and declares that their goal is to destroy Konoha, revealing his newly awakened Mangekyo Sharingan.
142	30	"Battle of Unraikyo"; Transliteration: "Unraikyō no tatakai" (Japanese: 雲雷峡の闘い)	Kiyomu Fukuda	Yasuyuki Suzuki	January 7, 2010	February 4, 2013
The Konoha teams decide to head back home as Sasuke remembers that he saw Itachi crying after the massacre. He then states that he cannot rebuild the Uchiha clan in the same way that Itachi had envisioned. Madara, happy that he can use Sasuke for himself, assigns Taka the task of capturing the Eight-Tails while Akatsuki hunts the last two. Taka tracks down the host, Killer Bee, to the Land of Lightning and engages him in battle. Bee manages to overpower Jugo and Suigetsu before Sasuke steps up to fight him one-on-one.
143	31	"The Eight-Tails vs. Sasuke"; Transliteration: "Hachibi' tai 'Sasuke" (Japanese: 「八尾」対「サスケ」)	Atsushi Nigorikawa	Shin Yoshida	January 14, 2010	February 4, 2013
Sasuke fights Killer Bee and is injured by his swords. Karin heals him, and Sasuke, Suigetsu, and Jugo then begin a combined assault on Bee until he decides to use the Eight-Tails' power. Sasuke is injured and revived again by Jugo, who regresses in age as a result. All healed, Sasuke unleashes Amaterasu on Bee in desperation, finally able to subdue him. Meanwhile, two Cloud ninja watch the fight from a cliff, and they notice the Uchiha crest on Sasuke's back. They rush the news to Bee's big brother, the Fourth Raikage Ay.

== Home media release ==
=== Japanese ===
Volume	Date	Discs	Episodes	Reference
1	January 13, 2010	1	113–116	
2	February 3, 2010	1	117–118, 121–122	
3	March 3, 2010	1	123–126	
4	April 7, 2010	1	127–130	
5	May 12, 2010	1	131–133	
6	June 2, 2010	1	134–138	
7	July 7, 2010	1	139–143	

=== English ===
Viz Media (North America, Region 1)
Box set	Date	Discs	Episodes	Reference
10	April 10, 2012	3	113–126	
11	July 10, 2012	3	127–140	
12	October 9, 2012	3	141–153	

Viz Media (North America, Region 1 Blu-ray sets)
Volume	Date	Discs	Episodes	Ref.
5	January 14, 2025	4	111–137	
6	April 29, 2025	4	138–165	

Manga Entertainment (United Kingdom, Region 2)
Volume	Date	Discs	Episodes	Reference
10	September 10, 2012	2	113–126	
11	November 26, 2012	2	127–140	
12	March 18, 2013	2	141–153	

Madman Entertainment (Australia/New Zealand, Region 4)
Collection	Date	Discs	Episodes	Reference
10	July 4, 2012	2	113–126	
11	October 24, 2012	2	127–140	
12	January 9, 2013	2	141–153	
