= Wheel spikes =

Automotive accessory

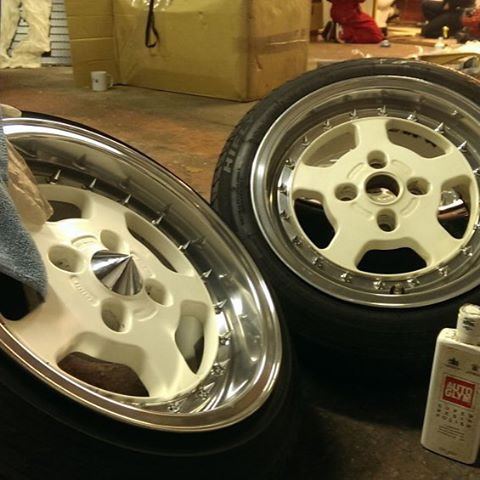
Car wheels with spikes on the wheel and hubcap

Wheel spikes are pointy protrusions attached to the wheels or hubcaps of vehicles, most commonly cars and semi-trucks. Most wheel spikes sold are made out of plastic painted to mimic metal and are primarily novelty items. The safety and legality of wheel spikes have often been questioned, and they may constitute a traffic violation in some jurisdictions.

== Overview ==
Wheel spikes attached to the hubcaps of semi trucks are essentially stylized versions of plastic lug nut covers, which may offer protection from rusting and have more common round and flat counterparts. Some wheel spikes applied to cars, known as "swangers," are much larger and longer and are permanently attached to the rims, and usually command much higher prices, from US$4,500 to US$10,000.

Wheel spikes are commonly associated with the post-apocalyptic franchise Mad Max, where many characters have spikes in the wheels of their vehicles, which serve both to attack and defend against other vehicles.

== Legality ==
Wheel spikes often cause controversy due to their menacing appearance despite being mostly made of plastic and easily removed or broken off. However, they may cause injuries to pedestrians and cyclists, and their use may break laws regarding maximum vehicle width. Some private transport companies prohibit drivers from attaching wheel spikes to the wheels of company-owned vehicles to avoid a negative public image.

Wheel spikes and other "projections on the face of wheels" are prohibited in Hawaii since 2016. In the state of Washington, the Revised Code of Washington prohibits "wheel nuts, hub caps or wheel discs [...] which: (a) incorporate winged projections; or (b) constitute a hazard to pedestrians and cyclists." A bill proposed in the New York State Senate in 2015 intended to ban "dangerous wheels," defined as sharp wheel accessories that extend over 2 inches (51 millimeters). Other US states may prohibit wheel spikes only if they extend the width of the vehicle beyond a specific limit. For example, in Texas, it is 8 feet (2.4 meters) for passenger cars, and in Florida, the limit is 8.5 feet (2.6 meters).

In the Australian state of Victoria, fitting vehicles with "any protruding object that is likely to increase the risk of bodily injury" is punishable with an AU$379 fine, and wheel spikes may also increase the width of a vehicle beyond the legal limit of 2.5 meters (8.2 feet).

== See also ==
- Scythed chariot – An ancient, military counterpart
