= Riding Bean =

1989 Japanese original video animation

ライディング・ビーン
- Genre: Action, comedy
- Manga
- Written by: Kenichi Sonoda
- Magazine: Monthly Comics Noisy
- Original run: September 1988 – February 1989
- Original video animation
- Directed by: Yasuo Hasegawa
- Produced by: Tooru Miura; Hiroshi Tazaki
- Written by: Kenichi Sonoda
- Music by: David Garfield
- Studio: AIC, Artmic
- Licensed by: AnimEigo
- Released: February 22, 1989
- Runtime: 48 minutes
- icon

Riding Bean (ライディング・ビーン) is a 1989 anime original video animation following the exploits of courier-for-hire Bean Bandit and his partner, gunwoman and ace investigator Rally Vincent.

A manga was also published in the Japanese magazine Monthly Comic Noizy (月刊コミックノイズィ, Gekkan Komikku Noizui) that was left unfinished (due to the closure of the magazine) after its fourth chapter. The manga is included in the final volume of the Revised Edition of the Gunsmith Cats manga.

== Plot ==
The anime follows one day in the life of Bean Bandit and Rally Vincent, as they find that they have been framed for the kidnapping of Chelsea Grimwood, the daughter of Mr. Grimwood, president of the Grimwood Company/Grimwood Conglomerate. However, it is Bean's longtime nemesis, criminal mastermind Semmerling, by way of various disguises, tricks, and manipulations, who is the real kidnapper—and the real target is Mr. Grimwood himself.

While the police are in hot pursuit of Bean and Rally, along with Chelsea in tow, Semmerling and her teenage helper Carrie plan to make a secret getaway with Mr. Grimwood as hostage.

== Cast ==
Cast
Role	Japanese	English
Role	Japanese	Southwynde Studios (1994)
Bean Bandit	Hideyuki Tanaka	J. Patrick Lawlor
Irene "Rally" Vincent	Naoko Matsui	Brennan MacKenzie
Semmerling	Mami Koyama	Barbara Lewis
Percy Bacharach	Kei Tomiyama	David Kraus
Carrie	Megumi Hayashibara	Susan McQueen
George Grimwood	Jun Hazumi	J. David Arnold
Police Chief	Yusaku Yara	Timothy J. Walsh
Dick	Nobuo Tobita	Adam Guzman
Chelsea Grimwood	Chieko Honda	Mary Boucher
Morris Grey	Michitaka Kobayashi	Marc Garber
Rick		John C. Stuart
Robber	Michitaka Kobayashi	Marc Garber
Guards	Kouzou Shioya; Kazumi Tanaka; Juurouta Kosugi	John Peckham
Waitress	Tomoko Maruo	Jean Hrdlicka

== Production ==
Only one episode of Riding Bean was produced and the planned series was never made, due, it is said, to a falling out between writer Kenichi Sonoda and Toshiba EMI.

Sonoda then went on to create the manga comic series Gunsmith Cats. In this series Rally Vincent was the star, but she was now dark-haired (as opposed to blond in the anime), of Asian Indian descent and a bounty hunter. Bean Bandit was a regular character, again as a freelance mob driver. Sonoda stated that the character was a "guy I can identify with much more personally" as compared to the female heroines. He and Rally were not partners, and in fact their relationship varied from ally to enemy depending on the circumstances. Rally's signature car in Gunsmith Cats was the 1967 Shelby Mustang GT500 used by Percy in the anime.

Percy himself appeared in the series Gunsmith Cats Burst, depicted as being in obsessive pursuit of Bean Bandit, with his aim being not to arrest but to actually kill the rogue driver.

Goldie Musou, a character psychologically similar to Semmerling (albeit drawn as a taller woman with a more butch demeanor), also appeared in Gunsmith Cats as a powerful Mafia queen and Rally Vincent's nemesis.

== Media ==
AnimEigo originally released the Riding Bean OVA on VHS in 1990 in Japanese with English subtitles. It was also one of its first releases along with Metal Skin Panic MADOX-01. AnimEigo later produced an English dub of the OVA in 1993, and it was released on VHS and Laserdisc early that year. AnimEigo also released the OVA on DVD on March 26, 2002, in a single disc release with Japanese and English language tracks and English subtitles. Bandai Visual released the OVA on Blu-ray on November 21, 2008, in Japan. The principal characters also made cameo appearances in the super-deformed ARTMIC special titled Scramble Wars.

A CD soundtrack was released by Artmic records featuring BGMs (background music tracks) and vocal tracks from the OVA. Songs included "Runnin' the Road", "King of the Road", and "Road Buster" by Phil Perry and "Bad Girl" by Andrea Robinson. It was reissued on CD in 2001 on Garfield's Creatchy label.

Robert Woodhead, founder of AnimEigo, ran a Kickstarter campaign that ended on April 5, 2016, and raised in excess of US$130,000 (the initial goal was US$30,000) for the 2017 limited-edition Blu-ray release called a "High Octane Edition". It used the same uncompressed HD transfer as the Japanese BD release, but using a BD50 instead of BD25 for a higher bitrate. It contains both the original Japanese soundtrack and the English dub, plus English subtitles in multicolor, greyscale and SDH variants. The disc is not region-coded.

On May 18, 2018, Kenichi Sonoda revealed Project Bean Bandit, a sequel to Riding Bean. The project, a pilot for a new series, was successfully funded on Kickstarter at ¥23,343,872 (pledged of a ¥15,000,000 goal) and was released in May 2022.

== Reception ==
Critical reception of Riding Bean has been generally positive. Christopher Farris of Anime News Network, on the 35th anniversary of the OVA's release in 2024, gave it a B+ rating, praising the artwork, animation, soundtrack, and story, but criticized the relationship between the two main villains Carrie and Semmerling, describing it as weird, as well as the short runtime. Farris ultimately concluded that the OVA "feels like a labor of love on all fronts, from its reflection of the enthusiasm of its creator to the polished production for this release. The OVA itself may be just above average, but the history and care behind it make it engaging."

Raphael See of THEM Anime Reviews gave Riding Bean a 3 out of 5 star rating, handing out praise for the artwork, animation, soundtrack, story and characters, but criticized the ending, length, as well as the relationship between Semmerling and Carrie. See ultimately concluded the review by saying, "as an action flick, Bean delivers as promised, and you'll get some good sequences out of it. But you've got to wonder if it could have been done better."
