= Artmic =

Japanese animation design studio

- Native name: 有限会社アートミック
- Romanized name: Yūgen-gaisha Ātomikku
- Type: Yūgen-gaisha
- Industry: Anime
- Founded: 1978; 48 years ago
- Defunct: 1997; 29 years ago
- Successor: AIC Rights
- Headquarters: Japan
- Key people: Toshimichi Suzuki

Artmic Co., Ltd., (Japanese: 有限会社アートミック, Hepburn: Yūgen-gaisha Ātomikku) was a Japanese animation design studio formed in 1978. AIC RIGHTS now holds the intellectual property of most of Artmic's titles. The studio was founded by Toshimichi Suzuki, a former producer at Tatsunoko Production, in 1978, and operated as a design house rather than a traditional animation studio. The company's name is short for "Art and Modern Ideology for Creation". It went bankrupt and was liquidated in 1997.

== Members ==
- Kenichi Sonoda
- Shinji Aramaki
- Kimitoshi Yamane
- Hideki Kakinuma

== Works ==
=== Feature films and single-episode OVAs ===
Feature films and single-episode OVAs
| Year | Series title | Director | Runtime | In partnership with |
|---|---|---|---|---|
| 1982 | The Wizard of Oz | Fumihiko Takayama | 80 minutes | Topcraft |
| 1982 | Techno Police 21C | Masashi Matsumoto | 80 minutes | Studio Nue |
| 1985 | Megazone 23 – Part I | Noboru Ishiguro | 80 minutes | Artland |
| 1986 | Megazone 23 – Part II | Ichirō Itano | 80 minutes | Artland |
| 1986 | Mospeada: Love Live Alive | Katsuhisa Yamada | 50 minutes | Tatsunoko |
| 1986 | Wanna-Be's | Yasuo Hasegawa | 45 minutes | AIC |
| 1986 | Gall Force: Eternal Story | Katsuhito Akiyama | 85 minutes | AIC |
| 1987 | Gall Force 2: Destruction | Katsuhito Akiyama | 50 minutes | AIC |
| 1987 | Metal Skin Panic MADOX-01 | Shinji Aramaki | 40 minutes | AIC |
| 1988 | Ten Little Gall Force | Katsuhito Akiyama | 25 minutes | AIC |
| 1988 | Gall Force 3: Stardust Wars | Katsuhito Akiyama | 60 minutes | AIC |
| 1989 | Riding Bean | Yasuo Hasegawa | 50 minutes | AIC |
| 1992 | Scramble Wars | Hiroyuki Fukushima | 25 minutes | AIC |
| 1996 | Hikarian | Chikae Kuwahara | 25 minutes | Tokyo Kids |

=== TV and OVA series ===
TV and OVA series
| Year | Series title | Director | No. of episodes | In partnership with |
|---|---|---|---|---|
| 1983 | Genesis Climber Mospeada | Katsuhisa Yamada | 25 | Tatsunoko |
| 1984 | Super High Speed Galvion | Akira Shigino | 22 | Kokusai Eigasha |
| 1987 | Bubblegum Crisis | Katsuhito Akiyama | 8 | AIC |
| 1987 | Dangaioh | Toshiki Hirano | 3 | AIC |
| 1988 | Hades Project Zeorymer | Toshiki Hirano | 4 | AIC |
| 1989 | Megazone 23 – Part III | Shinji Aramaki; Kenichi Yatagai | 2 | AIC |
| 1990 | Hissatsuman | Hiroshi Sasagawa | 3 | Watanabe Promotion |
| 1990 | A.D. Police Files | Takamasa Ikegami; Akira Nishimori | 3 | AIC |
| 1991 | Bubblegum Crash | Hiroshi Ishiodori | 3 | Artland |
| 1991 | Detonator Orgun | Masami Ohbari | 3 | AIC |
| 1992 | Genesis Survivor Gaiarth | Shinji Aramaki | 3 | AIC |
| 1993 | Casshan: Robot Hunter | Hiroyuki Fukushima | 4 | Tatsunoko |
| 1994 | Genocyber | Koichi Ohata | 5 | Artland |
| 1994 | Gatchaman | Akihiko Nishiyama | 3 | Tatsunoko |
| 1995 | Battle Skipper | Takashi Watanabe | 3 | Tokyo Kids |
| 1996 | Power Dolls | Tsuneo Tominaga; Masamitsu Hidaka | 2 | OLM |
