= Film comic =

Japanese manga illustrated with video release images

A film comic (フィルムコミック, firumu komikku) or anime comic (アニメコミック, anime komikku) is a Japanese manga volume illustrated with images from an anime series, film, or video release, rather than original custom art. They generally contain the full dialog from the anime from which they are adapted. While usually published in book form, they are also sometimes released electronically as e-books, occasionally called e-manga. Companies such as Tokyopop and Viz release film comics under the trademarks Cine-manga and Ani-manga, respectively.

The technique is similar to photo comics, many of which use stills from live-action movies or television series to adapt these stories to the comics medium.

Film comics have been well received in English-speaking countries, with some titles selling more than 500,000 copies.
