= A.D. Police: To Protect and Serve =

1999 cyberpunk anime television series

- North American DVD cover of A.D. Police: To Protect and Serve (Complete Series)

アドバンスドポリス (Adobansudo Porisu)
- Anime television series
- Directed by: Hidehito Ueda
- Written by: Yasuko Hoshikawa
- Music by: Yoshinobu Hiraikawa
- Studio: AIC
- Licensed by: NA: Nozomi Entertainment
- Original network: TV Tokyo
- English network: US: Anime Network
- Original run: April 7, 1999 – June 30, 1999
- Episodes: 12
- Related works
- Bubblegum Crisis; Bubblegum Crisis Tokyo 2040; AD Police Files; Bubblegum Crash; Parasite Dolls; Bubblegum Crisis (role-playing game)
- icon

A.D. Police: To Protect and Serve (アドバンスドポリス, Adobansudo Porisu) is a 1999 cyberpunk anime television series. It is set in a rebooted universe of Bubblegum Crisis, as it is a prequel to the series reboot, Bubblegum Crisis Tokyo 2040.

A.D. Police: To Protect and Serve premiered on TV Tokyo on April 7, 1999, and ran until its conclusion on June 30, 1999.

== Background ==
In 1999 Tokyo was ravaged by an enormous earthquake, leaving the city a desolate wasteland. The government functions relocated to the surrounding suburbs, leaving the former capital to deteriorate into a slum. Reconstruction of the area was thought impossible until a company named Genom, a corporation that made humanoid machines called VOOMERS, began to implement a plan to rebuild Tokyo in 2005. Tokyo has been reborn as "Genom City", a metropolis completely under the control of Genom. This resurrection did not come without a price, as overdrive accidents concerning illegal VOOMERS produced by "Packer Syndicate" have been on the rise.

== Plot ==
The story is based around the lives of Sasaki Kenji and Hans Kleif, two young A.D. Police Detectives who find themselves forging a bond after being forced to work together in order to stop the rogue VOOMERS from turning Genom City back into an urban wasteland. Kenji is a loner who is known for his lack of teamwork. It is this attitude that causes many of his previous partners to be injured or even killed. His latest partner, Paul, was heavily injured during their last mission together and it is said that nobody is willing to work with Kenji. He goes to his favorite bar and has a fight with a man named Hans. When he goes to his office the next morning, he is informed that Hans is actually his new partner.

Throughout the series Kenji, Hans, and the rest of the A.D. Police Force find themselves pitted against Liam Fletcher, the series' main antagonist and a leading figure in the Packer Syndicate. The series features different members of the police force responding to BOOMER-related situations and growing closer, not only as a unit of police officers, but as a group of friends. The series places an extremely heavy emphasis on the growing relationship between Kenji and Hans although others, such as the romantic connection between Kenji and Kyoko, also play an important role.

== Characters ==
Kenji Sasaki
Kenji is a lone wolf who refuses to work alongside anyone, believing that he can do anything on his own. Recognized among the A.D. Police force due to his superior vision and reflexes, his only major falling is his tendency to put his partners into unnecessary danger. He is the strong, silent type but begins to open up gradually thanks to his girlfriend, Kyoko, and his partner, Hans.
Hans Kleif
After an accident in which a piece of shrapnel gets embedded in his brain, Hans loses all memories of his past. He was transferred from the regular police force in Germany and joins the A.D. Police as the resident rookie. His great sense of humor and friendly attitude make him much easier to get along with than Kenji, and it comes as no surprise that the two do not get along well when they first meet. Slowly but surely Hans gets adapted to this new life, but he still worries about the memories he lost.
Hideaki Kurata
Kurata is a man who refuses to leave the frontlines of the war against the BOOMERS. He has had many chances for promotion but has always refused the jobs that would take him away from the action. He cares for his crew members, and refuses to leave their side. His love with his ex-girlfriend, Nancy, also makes it harder for him to leave his job.
Nancy Wilson
Nancy is an assertive New York native. She used to date Kurata, but the couple broke up and Nancy married another. She is recently divorced and her responsibilities as the Section Manager often seem to supersede those of a mother. Because of her busy work life, Nancy's four-year-old daughter is often left under the care of Nancy's sister.
Jose Collins
Jose was born into the family of a rich banker, but his entire family was killed in a terrorist bombing. Because of this experience he decided to become a bomb disposal expert. The only member of the A.D. Police to marry and have a child, Jose has vowed to defend his new family at all costs.
Karen Jordan
Karen is the crew's expert in long-distance shooting. She is half African-American and Japanese. Her father abandoned her and her mother when Karen was still young, creating a wound that would fester into a deep hatred of men. However, that hatred begins to alleviate due to her friendship with the other members of the A.D. Police.
Mary Malone
Mary was a member of the New York Police Department before joining the A.D. Police Force. She is highly skilled and is considered to have an obsession with guns. She also enjoys behaving like the senior officer around Hans since he is the crew's newest member.
Kyouko Miyano
Kyoko is Kenji's girlfriend, and the two met when Kenji saved her from an attacking BOOMER. Kenji keeps his relationship a secret since he doesn't want to appear weak in front of the other members of his crew. It is only around Kyoko that Kenji's emotions come to the surface. She usually plays her violin for him after he is finished solving difficult cases since it brings him some measure of peace.

== Cast ==
Major cast
Role	Japanese	English
Role	Japanese	ADV Studios (2001)
Narrator		Jay Hickman
Kenji Sasaki	Susumu Chiba	Randy Sparks
Hans Kleif	Takumi Yamazaki	Jason Douglas
Nancy Wilson	Yukari Nozawa	Kaytha Coker
José Collins	Kouji Ishii	C. Markham Anderson
Karen Jordan	Chiharu Tezuka	Christine Auten
Mary Malone	Ayaka Kodama	Emily Carter
Hideaki Kurata	Shinpachi Tsuji	John Swasey
Kyouko Miyano	Ayako Kawasumi	Rozie Curtis
Liam Fletcher	Tooru Furusawa	Andy McAvin
Yuki Satomi	Youko Soumi	Shawn Taylor
Muyoshi Kaibara	Takashi Nagasako	John Swasey
Bartender	Keiichi Sonobe	Phil Ross
Police Chief	Yuzuru Fujimoto	Phil Ross

Minor cast
#	Role	Japanese	English
#	Role	Japanese	ADV Studios (2001)
1	Paul Sanders	Tomohiro Nishimura	Illich Guardiola
1	Criminal (1)	Takashi Nagasako	
1	Report Announcer	Kouki Harasawa	
1	Paul's mother	Youko Soumi	
1	Girl	Nanako Fukushima	
1	Policeman	Tokuyoshi Kawashima	
2	Criminal (2)	Keiichi Sonobe	
2	Doctor	Tooru Furusawa	
2	Hospital Staff	Tokuyoshi Kawashima	
2	Boomer (1)	Kouki Harasawa	
3	Sid Phillips	Keiichi Sonobe	Mark Laskowski
3	Youzou Tazaki	Takashi Nagasako	Ted Pfister
3	TV Voice	Tokuyoshi Kawashima	
3	Boomer (2)	Kouki Harasawa	
4	Old Aunt	Nanako Fukushima	Marcy Rae
4	Bad Guy (1)	Kouki Harasawa	Victor Carsrud
4	Bad Guy (2)	Keiichi Sonobe	Mark Laskowski
4	Bad Guy (3)	Takashi Nagasako	Rick Peeples
5	Bad Guy (4)	Takashi Nagasako	Vic Mignogna
5	Guard Leader	Keiichi Sonobe	
6	Xenia Collins	Mika Doi	Kelly Manison
6	Katie Collins	Mika Kanai	Kira Vincent-Davis
6	Security Man	Kouki Harasawa	
7	Maître D'	Tokuyoshi Kawashima	Dean Turner
7	PA Voice	Keiichi Sonobe	Tiffany Grant
8	Man (1)	Tokuyoshi Kawashima	
9	Man (2)	Kouki Harasawa	
9	Scientist	Tokuyoshi Kawashima	
9	Worker (1)	Takashi Nagasako	
10	Pilot	Tokuyoshi Kawashima	
10	Copilot	Kouki Harasawa	
11	Worker (2)	Keiichi Sonobe	John Gremillion
11	Worker (3)	Tokuyoshi Kawashima	Jay Hickman
11	White Coat Man	Tokuyoshi Kawashima	
12	Genom Boomers	Kouki Harasawa	
12	Announcer	Nanako Fukushima	

=== Additional voices ===
English: Dean Turner, Hilary Haag, Jay Hickman, John Gremillion, Kelli Cousins, Kevin Charles, Mark Laskowski, Melissa Cybele, Monica Rial, Rick Peeples, Shawn Taylor, Ted Pfister, Tiffany Grant, Vic Mignogna, Victor Carsrud

== Reception ==
Critical reception of A.D. Police: To Protect and Serve has been mixed to negative. Anime News Network gave the series a rating of A− subbed, and B dubbed. They considered it more dark and suspenseful than AD Police Files, and stated that "the characters have more depth, and there are elements in the series that would glue just about anyone to the screen, whether it's the confrontation with the boomers, or just curiosity as to what's going to happen to everybody." They praised the characters for being likable, and called the series "just all-around exciting."

Issac Cynova of THEM Anime Reviews was far more critical, as he gave the series a rating of 2 out of 5 stars, and called it a poor-man's version of NYPD Blue. He praised the story but criticized the animation and the characters, stating that the two main leads "come off flatter than the proverbial pancake."

Kit Fox, Rio Yanez, and Urian Brown of Animerica all gave To Protect and Serve negative reviews. Fox commented that "the animation in A.D. Police is preposterously bad. The characters' mouths are inhumanly crooked, their glasses are equally crooked, and their faces are slackjawed." Yanez also derided the animation quality of the show and the two main leads, stating that "whatever enjoyment I could have possibly gotten out of this show was derided by the grotesque mouths in the series." Brown was even more critical, criticizing the two main leads, the animation, and the story, stating that "this has to be the most boring police anime ever created."

Writing in the third edition of The Anime Encyclopedia (2015), Jonathan Clements and Helen McCarthy described the television series as a "far shallower affair" than its predecessor, criticizing the replacement of many of the original characters with a clichéd buddy cop narrative. They interpreted the predominantly Western names of the characters as an attempt to appeal to international audiences and considered the remake disappointing.
