= AD Police Files =

1990 cyberpunk original video animation series

- United Kingdom DVD cover from Manga UK
- Original video animation
- Directed by: Takamasa Ikegami (1); Akira Nishimori (2–3)
- Written by: Shō Aikawa; Tony Takezaki
- Music by: Takehito Nakazawa; Kaoru Mizutani
- Studio: Artmic; AIC
- Licensed by: NA: AnimEigo; UK: Manga Entertainment
- Released: May 25, 1990 – November 22, 1990
- Runtime: 26 minutes per episode
- Episodes: 3
- Related works
- Bubblegum Crisis; Bubblegum Crisis Tokyo 2040; Bubblegum Crash; A.D. Police: To Protect and Serve; Parasite Dolls; Bubblegum Crisis (role-playing game)
- icon

AD Police Files is a 1990 three-part original video animation produced by Youmex and animated by Artmic and AIC. Set in 2027, it is a prequel to the Bubblegum Crisis OVA series, focusing mainly on AD Police officer Leon McNichol, the future rival and love interest of Knight Saber Priscilla Asagiri.

Due to the legal conflict between Artmic and Youmex, the production of the series was stopped with only three complete episodes made.

== Plot ==
Chronologically set 5 years before the events of Bubblegum Crisis, it focuses on AD Police (Advanced Police) inspector Leon McNichol's early days in the AD Police.

== Cast ==
Cast
Character		Japanese	English	
Character		Japanese	Southwynde Studios (1993)	World Wide Group (1994)
Leon McNichol		Toshio Furukawa	Brad Moranz	Adam Henderson
Gina Malso		Youko Matsuoka	Regan Forman	Shelley Thompson
Dieork		Tesshou Genda	Mark Fincannon	
1	Phantom Woman	Youko Asagami	Kelly Chalaire	
1	Alus	Atsushi Abe	Trampas Thompson	
1	Saeki	Ryuusei Nakao	Donn Ansell	
2	Iris Cara	Miina Tominaga	Juliet Cesario	Anne Marie Zola
2	Vanessa Bach	Emi Shinohara	Amy Nelson	Larissa Murray (as Linda Mathieson)
2	Police Chief	Kiyoshi Kawakubo	William Gibson	
2	Caroline Evers	Mika Doi	Hadley Eure	Liza Ross
3	Billy Fanword	Norio Wakamoto	Pierre Brulatour	Seán Barrett
3	Yoko Takagi	Sakiko Tamagawa	Suesann Cullen	
3	Psychologist	Tamio Ooki		
3	Hyde Cash	Kiyonobu Suzuki	Paul Sincoff	

=== Additional voices ===
Japanese: Hideyuki Umezu, Hitoshi Horimoto, Kiyonobu Suzuki, Morite Murakuni, Rena Yukie (as Rena Kurihara), Satoko Yasunaga, Shin'ichirou Miki, Toshiya Ueda, Toshiyuki Morikawa, Wataru Takagi

English (AnimEigo): Amanda Tancredi, Amy Parrish, Charles Page, Christopher Alexander, David Kraus, Eddie Harrell, Eric Paisley, Matt Blazon, Michael Sinterniklaas, Rod Barker, Scott O'Quinn, Scott Simpson, Vincent Schilling

== Episodes ==
Episode	English title (AnimEigo)/ English title (Manga UK) Japanese title	Original release date
1	The Phantom Woman/ Voomer Madness Maboroshi no Onna (幻の女)	25 May 1990
1	At the beginning of the episode, a heavily wounded Leon McNichol, who is still part of the Normal Police, faces down and kills a rampant Boomer prostitute. The action then cuts to a later incident, where the Normal Police are trying to destroy an older-model female Boomer that has gone rampant in a local Chinese restaurant. The Boomer proves too tough for them as it kills and injures several officers, and the AD Police are called in to assist. Several AD officers rush the Boomer and attempt to physically shut it down. Alus, one of the AD Police's veterans, is shot dead when the Boomer slips out of the squad's control. Having obtained the shop owner's permission, the squad commander orders the boomer to be destroyed by firing squad. Later, as the squad mourns Alus, an administrative official calls the legitimacy of his death into question. He says that after some investigation, there were no faults found in the Boomer’s programming, it was simply overworked, and wasn’t at fault for going haywire. He claims Alus knew the Boomer that killed him, frequented the tea shop regularly, and theorizes that he had tampered with the Boomer to kill him so that his family could collect on his large life insurance policy. Leon and his partner Gina Malso disagree, and aim to disprove the claim. They set out to show that other local Boomers had hidden faults as well. They make a visit to a hacker contact of Gina's who is able to provide them with a list of possible users that have been illegally recycling old and decommissioned Boomers. Meanwhile, they are shadowed by an unknown female, who is revealed to be the boomer Leon killed when he was with the Normal Police, obsessed with finding him. Gina and Leon split up to follow separate leads on Boomer recycling operations. After interrogating a shady factory owner, Gina discovers that the original, recycled Boomer was part of an underground sex trafficking business. Leon is stalked by the Boomer, but does not recognize her, instead taking her for a common prostitute. The boomer begins erotically fantasizing about Leon killing her again, is driven mad with bloodlust, and attacks him, hoping that he'll shoot her again. In the ensuing fight, Leon is again injured, and runs out of bullets. Just as the Boomer is about to kill him, Gina arrives and kills it, saving him. The episode ends with Leon questioning whether humans have a place in the city, or whether it belongs to the Boomers.	
2	The Ripper/ The Paradise Loop Za Rippā (ザ·リッパー)	24 August 1990
2	After a gruesome murder of a prostitute on the Tokyo subway line called Paradise Loop, AD Police steps in to help the Normal Police find the killer. Six prostitutes in total have been killed on Paradise Loop, and AD Police believes a Boomer is the culprit. Two officers of the Normal Police, Iris Cara and her partner Vanessa Bach, believe the killer is a human and was done out of hatred. While all the victims share the same stab wound to the abdomen, they died from massive cardiac arrest or shock. Feeling pain in her right eye, Iris goes to the organ bank to replace it with a cybernetic one and runs into Leon, who knows her from his time in the Normal Police. Leon tries to change her mind, saying she'll lose part of her humanity, but Iris laughs it off. Later, during a meeting with the doctor, Iris overhears an argument started by another patient, Caroline Evers, a billionaire and CEO of the Green Food Corporation. Iris has a hunch that Caroline is connected to the murders, and asks Leon and Gina to help shadow her. They track Caroline to an abandoned industrial district that Paradise Loop runs under. After further investigation, Vanessa and Iris learn that Caroline’s entire lower body was replaced with cybernetics. Iris then tails Caroline to the sewers, where she is then captured by her. Caroline explains to Iris that long ago she competed for the title of CEO of her current company, however a man got the job because he concocted a falsified chart that compared her menstrual cycles to her productivity. To alleviate the concerns of the company's board of directors, she had most of her organs replaced with cybernetics. As a result, she got the job. In time, the same man came to work under her and they fell in love and eventually married. She later discovered he cheated on her with a Paradise Loop prostitute, and when asked why, his response was "real women are better after all." After finishing her confession, Caroline loses all self-control and tries to kill Iris, but AD Police officers led by Leon and Gina arrive to save her, and Caroline flees. Shortly after, Leon tells Iris that if at least 70% of the human body becomes cybernetic, he or she is treated as a "Boomeroid" and can be killed with the same prejudice as a Boomer. But Iris believes Caroline is still human, and should be arrested instead. Fleeing to a subway train on the Loop, Caroline enters a car full of lowlifes and exposes herself, hoping to feel like a woman again. After AD Police stop the train with crash foam, she is found raped and stabbed to death. Gina then tells Iris that she got her wish: that Caroline died as a human. The episode closes with Iris opting to undergo the cybernetic surgery, and to "throw away a bit of her humanity."	
3	The Man Who Bites His Tongue/ I Want Medicine Shita o Kamu Otoko (舌を噛む男)	22 November 1990
3	Billy Fanword is the captain of the AD Police Special Mobile Squad. After sustaining massive injures during a fight with a rogue Boomer and almost dying, his only remaining viable organs—his brain and tongue—are transplanted into an experimental battle cyborg body. He has a habit of biting his tongue, as the pain of it reminds him that he was once human. After Billy physically tears apart a heavy Boomer, concerns are raised about his combat abilities and performance. Dr. Manabe, who created his body, blames him for what she sees as degrading performance, but her colleague argues that since he retains his brain and memories, it is an emotional issue. He suggests that Billy's memory be erased to improve his performance. Manabe develops an unhealthy sexual attraction to Billy and ups his dosage of DA-27, a sensory stimulant drug, so that he is more receptive of her advances. Billy gets hooked on the drug and becomes increasingly aggressive whenever he is deployed thanks to Manabe’s influence. Suspecting something is amiss, Gina, his former lover, confronts Manabe and accuses her of intentionally addicting him. Manabe waves the accusation away, saying that Billy is simply getting back to normal again. Gina disagrees, saying the she can feel that he's changed. As Manabe attempts to wean Billy off DA-27, he flies into a rage and experiences hallucinations. He obtains DA-27 from an illicit source to keep getting high without Manabe’s permission. After finding out that she plans to let him die in the line of duty once she has gained prestige from selling his design, he helps himself to a massive dose of DA-27 that finally causes him to lose touch with reality. Billy kills Manabe when she comes to check up on him, and goes on a rampage through AD Police headquarters, gunning down many officers. Gina, who has discovered his drug connection, arrives with an anti-tank rifle just in time to stop him from killing Leon. Billy begs her to kill him, saying that he can't feel anything and that pain will make him human again. As his final request, he asks her to shoot him in his tongue. The episode closes with Billy being buried in the cemetery.	

== Release ==
In North America, the series is licensed by AnimEigo, who first released the series to VHS and Laserdisc in 1993 in Japanese with English subtitles. They later reissued it in both formats in 1995 with an English dub produced by Southwynde Studios in Wilmington, NC. The show was released to bilingual DVD in 2004, with bonus content featuring music videos for various songs featured in the series as performed by Filipino singer Lou Bonnevie in addition to translation notes and production artwork. On September 27, 2015, AnimEigo announced that they will be funding a brand new HD telecine of the series from the original 35mm film in-house through Kickstarter, with a Blu-ray release planned for 2016. Though according to an update by AnimEigo on 30 December 2022, it had been reported that the film materials to A.D. Police Files had been lost. At Anime Expo 2026, AnimEigo announced that they will release a 4K remaster of the series (taken from the original camera negative) on a UHD/Blu-ray combo pack in January 2027.

In the UK, the series was licensed by Manga Entertainment, who produced their own English dub for VHS in 1994, and later issued it onto dub-only DVD in 2004. Their release is now out-of-print.

== Reception ==
Critical reception of A.D. Police Files has been generally positive. Helen McCarthy in 500 Essential Anime Movies describes The Phantom Woman as the video "definitely not for the faint hearted", noting that the "design is good and the atmosphere well maintained, but it's Aikawa's script that will stick in your mind". She also praised The Man Who Bites His Tongue as a "stylish, dark retelling of RoboCop".

Justin Sevakis of Anime News Network described A.D. Police Files as being "a flawed work, but has enough memorable moments and beautiful, macabre touches to redeem it in some way."

Raphael See of THEM Anime Reviews gave the series a rating of 3 out of 5 stars, praising the story and soundtrack but considered the animation to be "average." Overall, See states that "If you're a BGC junkie, you'll definitely enjoy this one. Other people might want to save this one until they run out of other things to watch."

Writing in the third edition of The Anime Encyclopedia (2015), Jonathan Clements and Helen McCarthy discussed the series' exploration of humanity in a technologically advanced society. They considered its treatment of women considerably more misogynistic than that of Bubblegum Crisis, noting how the acquisition of cybernetic enhancements was portrayed as eroding both femininity and humanity. They also identified similarities to Blade Runner in the first episode and criticized the final episode for its overt borrowing from RoboCop.

The anime entry in The Encyclopedia of Science Fiction notes that while "The series has exciting action and some good animation; however, enjoyment is hindered by the ridiculous elements", attributing much of the problems to the " over-simplification of the plot" due to "cramming too much into 27-minute episodes"; it also criticizes the "cringe-inducing depiction of women", and describes the main character, Leon, as a "unsympathetic nonentity".

== Legacy ==
=== Manga ===
North American manga cover of A.D. Police: Dead End City volume 1

A.D. Police: Dead End City (Japanese: A.D.POLICE 終焉都市, Hepburn: A.D.POLICE Shuuen Toshi), a seinen manga series written by Toshimichi Suzuki and illustrated by Tony Takezaki, is set between the first and the second part of A.D. Police Files. It was serialized by Byakuya Shobo on its seinen magazine Bandai B-Club between November 1989 and August 1990. Its chapters were compiled into a single volume that was later translated into English by Viz Communications for the United States and by Manga Books for the British audience and in French by Samourai.

The manga is set in 2032. The A.D. Police are an elite group of highly trained and specially equipped police officers, who have been formed to deal with terrorist activities and Boomer crimes in the city of Mega Tokyo.

The A.D. Police are offered a great deal of leeway in their activities, often blockading large sections of the city and causing great amounts of property damage in the course of fulfilling their duty. Despite their dedication to their jobs, however, the citizens of Mega Tokyo tend to dislike and distrust members of the A.D. Police, seeing them as corrupt and ineffectual.

=== Related series ===
In 1999, AIC created a reboot of A.D. Police Files called A.D. Police: To Protect and Serve that was broadcast by TV Tokyo. Unlike A.D. Police Files, it is set in the universe of the reboot series Bubblegum Crisis Tokyo 2040, and serves as a prequel to the aforementioned series.

Another OVA series revolving around the A.D. Police, Parasite Dolls, was released in 2003 by AIC. Like A.D. Police Files, it is set in the original Bubblegum Crisis universe and takes place directly after the events of the original OVA series. As of 2026, it is the last Bubblegum Crisis-related series to be released.
