= Jay Hickman (actor) =

American actor

- Born: May 23, 1973 (age 53)
- Occupation: Actor
- Years active: 1993–present

Jay Hickman (born May 23, 1973) is an American film and voice actor, best known for his prolific voice work on English language dubs of Japanese anime shows.

== Career ==
On the set of "Apollo 11" - 1996

Hickman lent his voice to the character of Mark in the 2002 Canadian film Touching Wild Horses, starring Jane Seymour. He has also a number of on-screen appearances, including an uncredited bit part in the 1998 film Rushmore opposite television and movie actress Alexis Bledel and Apollo 11.

In anime, he is known as the voice of Kurama from Elfen Lied, Kagetane Hiruko from Black Bullet, Crusty from the Log Horizon series and Ryuya from Air.

== Filmography ==
=== Anime ===
List of voice performances in anime
Year	Title	Role	Notes	Source
1994	Dirty Pair: Affair of Nolandia	Pilot B		
1998	Those Who Hunt Elves	Special Appearance by the Judge		
1999	Master of Mosquiton	Com. Officer B; Soldier C		
1999	Martian Successor Nadesico	Nagare Akatsuki		
1999	Bubblegum Crisis: Tokyo 2040	Various characters		
2000	Gasaraki	Lt. Col. Akihiro Hirokawa, others		
2000	Generator Gawl	Koji		
2001	A.D. Police	Narrator, others		
2001	Orphen	Various characters		
2001	Spriggan	Additional voices		
2001	Princess Nine	Various characters		
2002	Sorcerer on the Rocks	Shibas Scotch		
2002	A Tree of Palme	Jamji	film	
2002	Excel Saga	Toru Watanabe		
2003	Noir	Various characters		
2003	Neo Ranga	Kazuo Fujiwara, others		
2003	RahXephon	Itsuki Kisaragi, others		
2003	Rune Soldier	Various characters		
2003	Gamera 2: Attack of Legion	Col. Watarase	Live-action dub Also Lake Texarkana Gamera extra	
2003	Saiyuki	Shuei, Rikudo		
2003	Spectral Force	Zakiphon	OVA	
2003	Full Metal Panic!	Cpt. Sailor, others		
2003	Aura Battler Dunbine	Show Zama		
2003	Steel Angel Kurumi 2	Yutaka Kizuki, Scientist		
2003	Super GALS!	Various characters		
2003	Angelic Layer	Shuji Inada		
2003	Saint Seiya	Shiryu	ADV dub	
2003	Dirty Pair: Flight 005 Conspiracy	Agent		
2003	Martian Successor Nadesico: Prince of Darkness	Nagare Akatsuki	film	
2003	Magical Shopping Arcade Abenobashi	Tetsu "Papa" Asahina, others		
2004	Orphen: Revenge	Reed		
2004	Kino's Journey	The Lonely Man, Sixshooter, Soldier		
2004	Bastof Syndrome	Various characters		
2004	Gravion	Alex Smith, others		
2004	RahXephon: Pluralitas Concentio	Itsuki Kisaragi		
2004	Conduct Zero	Rumor Mill Blabbermouth	live-action dub	
2004	Megazone 23: Part 3	Eiji Takanaka	OVA	
2004	Aquarian Age	Ryusei		
2004	Chrono Crusade	Genai, others		
2004	Yesterday	Computer Tech, Aerial Newscast 1	live-action film dub	
2004	Mezzo DSA	Leon		
2004	Parasite Dolls	Eve's Client A, Police Dispatch A		
2004	2009 Lost Memories	Hideyo, others	live-action film dub	
2004–06	Kaleido Star	Fool		
2005	Cyberteam in Akihabara	Various characters		
2005	Gantz	Inamori		
2005	Kekko Kamen	Shuwarutsu Negataro		
2005	Divergence Eve	Bernard Firestar		
2005	Cromartie High School	Shinichi Mechazawa		
2005	Madlax	Triple Speed		
2005	Full Metal Panic? Fumoffu	Kotaro Onodera, others		
2005	Elfen Lied	Kurama		
2005	Princess Tutu	Mytho		
2005	Guns & Talks	Hamlet	live-action film dub	
2005	Dark Water	Yoshimi's Lawyer	live-action film dub	
2005	My Beautiful Girl Mari	Adult Nam-Woo	film	
2005	The Place Promised in Our Early Days	Graduate Student		
2005	Yugo the Negotiator	Reiichi Kogure		
2005	Public Enemy	Internal Affairs 2	live-action dub	
2005	Godannar	Various characters		
2005	The Fuccons	Teacher Bob, Punk		
2005	Samurai Gun	Ryouma Sakamoto		
2006	Misaki Chronicles	Bernard		
2006	Diamond Daydreams	Minoru Jinguji		
2006	Princess Tutu	Prince Mythos		
2006	Area 88	Goh "Rocky" Mutsuki		
2006	Papuwa	Shintaro		
2007	Utawarerumono	Munto		
2007	Air Gear	Spitfire		
2007	Le Chevalier d'Eon	King Louis XV		
2007	Kurau: Phantom Memory	Ijima		
2007	009-1	The Phantom, others		
2007	Guyver	Dr. Odagiri, others		
2007	Ghost Train	Detective 1		
2007	Air	Ryuya	Also special and movie	
2008	Kanon	Kuze		
2008	Appleseed: Ex Machina	Additional voices		
2010	Ghost Hound	Dr. Atsui Hirata		
2011	Phi Brain: Puzzle of God	Baron Kaidou		
2011	Guin Saga	Norisse		
2012	Gintama: The Movie	Nizo Okada		
2012	Un-Go	Makita	OVA episode	
2013	Nakaimo - My Sister Is Among Them!	Additional voices		
2013	Arcana Famiglia	Debito		
2014	Amnesia	Waka		
2014	Majestic Prince	Simon Gato		
2014	Sunday Without God	Wreck		
2014	Log Horizon	Crusty	also season 2	
2015	Outbreak Company	Officer Pervy		
2015	Vampire Hunter D	Greco Rohman	Sentai Filmworks dub	
2015	Black Bullet	Kagetane Hiruko		
2017	Gate	Koji Sugawara		
2017–22	Food Wars!: Shokugeki no Soma	Jōichirō Yukihira, nee Saiba		
2018	Revue Starlight	Giraffe		
2018	Princess Principal	Duke of Normandy		
2021–23	Vinland Saga	Floki	Sentai Filmworks/Crunchyroll dub	
2022	Iroduku: The World in Colors	Gen Tsukishiro		
2022	Vermeil in Gold	Summon Teacher		
2023	Akiba Maid War	Ramen Shop Owner, Club Regular		
2023	Farming Life in Another World	Michael		
2023	Oshi no Ko	The Manager		
2023	Love Flops	Sawatari		
2024	Ragna Crimson	Garm		
2024	The Most Heretical Last Boss Queen	Gilbert		
2024	The Dangers in My Heart	Yamada's Father		
2024	Level 1 Demon Lord and One Room Hero	Grimms		
2024	I Parry Everything	Deridas III		
2024	Dungeon People	Rangard		
2025	Lazarus	Kobayashi		
2025	Rock Is a Lady's Modesty	Shinji		

=== Live-action roles ===
List of acting performances in film and television
Year	Title	Role	Notes	Source
1996	Apollo 11	M.I.T. #1		
1998	Rushmore		Uncredited extra	
	Don't Look Back			
