= Bubblegum Crisis =

1987-91 original video animation series

- Bubblegum Crisis poster

バブルガムクライシス (Baburugamu Kuraishisu)
- Genre: Cyberpunk; Girls with guns
- Created by: Toshimichi Suzuki
- Original video animation
- Directed by: Katsuhito Akiyama; (chief director); Yasunori Ide (#1); Kenichi Yatagai (#2–3); Hiroki Hayashi (#4); Masami Ōbari (#5–6); Fumihiko Takayama (#7); Hiroaki Gōda (#8)
- Produced by: Junji Fujita; Toru Miura
- Written by: Toshimichi Suzuki
- Music by: Kōji Makaino
- Studio: Artmic & AIC
- Licensed by: AUS: Madman Entertainment (expired); NA: AnimEigo; UK: MVM Films
- Released: February 25, 1987 – January 30, 1991
- Runtime: 330 minutes (total): 45 minutes (#1); 28 minutes (#2); 26 minutes (#3); 38 minutes (#4); 43 minutes (#5); 49 minutes (#6–7); 52 minutes (#8)
- Episodes: 8
- Related works
- Bubblegum Crisis Tokyo 2040; Bubblegum Crash; AD Police Files; A.D. Police: To Protect and Serve; Parasite Dolls; Bubblegum Crisis (role-playing game)
- icon

Bubblegum Crisis (Japanese: バブルガムクライシス, Hepburn: Baburugamu Kuraishisu) is a 1987–1991 Japanese cyberpunk original video animation (OVA) series produced by Youmex and animated by AIC and Artmic. Set in the year 2032, seven years after a massive earthquake devastates Tokyo, the story centers on the reconstruction of the city (now "Megatokyo") under the influence of the megacorporation Genom, which mass-produces bio-organic androids called Boomers for labor and defense. When Boomers begin malfunctioning and rampaging through the city, the Knight Sabers surface as an all-female quartet of mercenaries who use advanced powered suits to combat rogue Boomers. The success of the series spawned multiple sequel and prequel series, as well as a reboot.

== Plot ==
The series begins in late 2032, seven years after the Second Great Kantō earthquake has split Tokyo geographically and culturally in two.

In the first episode, disparities in wealth are shown to be more pronounced than in previous periods in postwar Japan. One of the series' themes is the inability of the department to deal with threats due to political infighting, red tape, and an insufficient budget.

The main adversary is Genom, a megacorporation with immense power and global influence. Its main product are boomers—synthetic cyborgs. These are also known as "cyberoids". While Boomers are intended to serve mankind, they become deadly instruments in the hands of ruthless individuals. The AD Police ("Advanced Police") are tasked with dealing with Boomer-related crimes.

== Setting ==
The setting displays strong influences from the movies Blade Runner and Streets of Fire. The opening sequence of episode 1 is even modeled on that of the latter film. The humanoid robots known as "boomers" in the series were inspired by several movies, including Replicants from the aforementioned Blade Runner, the titular cyborgs of the Terminator film franchise, and the Beast from the film Krull.

Suzuki explained in a 1993 Animerica interview the meaning behind the cryptic title: "We originally named the series 'bubblegum' to reflect a world in crisis, like a chewing-gum bubble that's about to burst."

== Production ==
The series started with Toshimichi Suzuki's intention to remake the 1982 film Techno Police 21C. In 1985, he met Junji Fujita and the two discussed ideas; the trio decided to collaborate on what later became Bubblegum Crisis. Kenichi Sonoda acted as character designer, and designed the four female leads. Masami Ōbari created the mechanical designs, and directed episodes 5 and 6. Satoshi Urushihara acted as the chief production supervisor and guest character designer for Episode 7.

The OVA series is eight episodes long, made as eight separate works, with lengths varying from 26 to 52 minutes.

A common misunderstanding that has developed, dating back as far as at least the mid-2000s, is that the series was planned and written to be 13 episodes, and that either legal or financial issues resulted in the series having only eight episodes. The prevalence of this belief has resulted in it appearing in discussions of the series, even in Anime News Network articles, and an Otaku USA feature from 2011.

However, commentaries and interviews with production staff contradict this. Production designer Hideki Kakinuma said in commentary notes that appeared with the 2018 Animeigo release of the OVA series, "At the time there was no plan to make it into a series, each film was going to be made one at a time." Katsuhito Akiyama, director of OVA parts 1, 2, and 3 echoed this in a November 1997 interview, recalling challenges in directing the OVA parts and creating a narrative due to a lack of long-term plan, "... it was not easy to keep on producing episodes without knowing a clear plan of how many total they want us to make." Further the staff do not discuss or mention the existence of these issues hampering the project in these interviews and commentaries, which included directors, voice actresses, character designers, even AIC president Tōru Miura. Akiyama recalled the experience of working on the production as "fun".

== Cast ==
Major cast
Role	Japanese	English
Role	Japanese	Southwynde Studios
Sylia Stingray	Yoshiko Sakakibara	Jemila Ericson
Priscilla "Priss" Asagiri	Kinuko Ōmori	Sinda Nichols
Linna Yamazaki	Michie Tomizawa	Elizabeth Becka
Nene Romanova	Akiko Hiramatsu	Susan Grillo
Mackie Stingray	Nozomu Sasaki	Frank Trimble
Daley Wong	Kenyu Horiuchi	Marshall Caroll
Leon McNichol	Toshio Furukawa	Brad Moranz
Brian J. Mason	Shūichi Ikeda	Eric Paisley
Largo	Kazuyuki Sogabe	Pierre Brulatour
Quincy Rosenkreutz	Kiyoshi Kawakubo	J. David Arnold
Chief Todo	Masaharu Satō	David Kraus
Fargo	Koichi Yamadera	Geoffrey Honaker

Minor cast
#	Role	Japanese	English
#	Role	Japanese	Southwynde Studios
1	Chopper 3 Pilot		David Kraus
1	AD Police Communicator		Barbara Lewis
1	Commander Swarz	Teiji Ōmiya	Michael S. Way
1	Sylia Stingray (young)		Loren Mash
1	Mackie Stingray (young)		Michael Sinterniklaas
1	Katsuhito Stingray	Hiroya Ishimaru	Kevin Dowling
1	Bogey	Yusaku Yara	Marc Matney
1	Retort	Keiichi Nanba	Marc Garber
1	F.G. Frederick	Jūrōta Kosugi	Clifton Daniel
1	Deputy Commander	Shinya Ōtaki	Patt Noday
1	Checkpoint Guard	Michitaka Kobayashi	Steve Rassin
1	Cynthia	Hiroko Kasahara	Maryann Webb
1	Female Boomer	Urara Takano	Belinda Bizic-Keller
2	Irene Chang	Miki Itō	Jean Hrdlicka
2	Company Man 1		Matt Sullivan
2	Company Man 2		Sean Clay
2	AD Police Officer	Masaaki Okamura	Michael Sinterniklaas
2	Female Boomer Vocals	Urara Takano	
2	Guard		Nathan Gray
3	Manager	Ikuya Sawaki	Mick McGovern
3	Shou	Kyōko Hamura	Ted Davis
3	Shou's Mother	Minori Matsushima	Amy Parrish
3	Funk	Daisuke Gōri	Marc Matney
4	Dr. Raven	Kenichi Ogata	Michael Titterton
4	J.B. Gibson	Kaneto Shiozawa	Zach Hanner
4	Naomi Anderson	Mayumi Shō	Mindi L. Lyons
4	Outrider	Michitaka Kobayashi	Patt Noday
5	Anri	Yūko Mizutani	Katherine Kopec-Burton
5	Sylvie	Yoshino Takamori	Martha Ellen Senseney
5	Kaufman	Ikuya Sawaki	Chuck Kinlaw
5	Flint	Shinya Ōtaki	Jon Guttman
5	Captain	Michitaka Kobayashi	Jay Bryson
5	Lou	Yumi Tōma	Tammy Starling
5	Meg	Tomoko Maruo	Hadley Eure
5	Nam	Megumi Hayashibara	Belinda Bizic-Keller
5	Captain	Michitaka Kobayashi	Jay Bryson
5	Doctor	Motomu Kiyokawa	Tom Holmes
6	Kate	Urara Takano	Emily Young-Keeley
6	Callahan	Shinya Ōtaki	Steve Vernon
6	Executive 1	Ikuya Sawaki	Sean Clay
6	Executive 2	Kōzō Shioya	Nicolas Bottom
6	Boomer	Michitaka Kobayashi	Zach Hanner
7	Reika Chang	Maiko Hashimoto	Mindi L. Lyons
7	Kou	Yasunori Matsumoto	Zach Hanner
7	Richard McLaren	Ikuya Sawaki	Eddie Harrell
7	Gulf and Bradley Chairman	Masashi Hirose	Timothy J. Walsh
7	Yamada	Michitaka Kobayashi	Gray Sibley
7	Staffer	Katsumi Suzuki	Kevin Reilly
7	Interviewer	Yumi Tōma	Joyce Leigh Bowden
7	Mr. Chang	Eken Mine	Mark Fincannon
8	Lisa Vanetta	Aya Hisakawa	Amy Parrish
8	Naoko	Junko Asami	Belinda Bizic-Keller
8	Miriam Yoshida	Issei Futamata	Dick Bunting
8	Ebisu Operator	Kenichi Ono	Eliot Preschutti
8	Ebisu President	Hideyuki Umezu	David Long
8	Ebisu Worker	Michitaka Kobayashi	Jay Bryson
8	AD Police Receptionist	Chisa Yokoyama	Amanda Tancredi

=== Additional voices ===
English: Amanda Tancredi, Chuck Denson Jr., Chuck Kinlaw, David Kraus, Eliot Preschutti, Gray Sibley, Hadley Eure, Hank Troscianiec, J. Patrick Lawlor, Jack Bowden, Jay Bryson, Kevin Reilly, Marc Garber, Marc Matney, Michael Sinterniklaas, Scott Simpson, Sean Clay, Sophia Tolar, Steve Lalla, Steve Rassin, Steve Vernon, Zach Hanner

== Episodes ==
No.	Title	Runtime	Japan first release dates	English first release dates
1	"Tinsel City"	45 minutes	February 25, 1987	August 30, 1991
The Knight Sabers are hired to rescue a little girl from a group of kidnappers.
2	"Born to Kill"	28 minutes	September 5, 1987	September 27, 1991
A friend of Linna's threatens to expose Genom secrets that led to the death of her fiancé, but Genom plans to silence her.
3	"Blow Up"	26 minutes	December 5, 1987	October 10, 1991
The Knight Sabers attack Genom Tower to put an end to the machinations of Genom executive Brian J. Mason.
4	"Revenge Road"	38 minutes	July 24, 1988	December 19, 1991
A racer modifies his car into a weapon of vengeance against the biker gangs of Megatokyo.
5	"Moonlight Rambler"	43 minutes	December 25, 1988	January 23, 1992
A killer is draining victims of their blood, but this is not a vampire. A pair of escaped love-doll androids, Priss's new friend Sylvie and the D.D. super-weapon have a connection.
6	"Red Eyes"	49 minutes	August 30, 1989	February 27, 1992
A group of fake Knight Sabers are ruining the group's reputation, leading to a fight against a returning foe.
7	"Double Vision"	49 minutes	March 14, 1990	March 19, 1992
A singer with a vendetta comes to Megatokyo, and brings some heavy firepower with her.
8	"Scoop Chase"	52 minutes	January 30, 1991	April 2, 1992
An ambitious technical scientist and an aspiring reporter both plan to make their names at the expense of the Knight Sabers, and Nene is caught in this matter.

== Release ==
In North America, AnimEigo first released Bubblegum Crisis to VHS and LaserDisc in 1991 in Japanese with English subtitles. The series is notable in that it was one of the few early anime series that were brought over from Japan unedited and subtitled in English. While anime has become much more popular in the years since, in 1991, it was still mostly unknown as a storytelling medium in North America. Bubblegum Crisis was aired in the US when it first aired on PBS affiliate Superstation KTEH in the 1990s, and STARZ!'s Action Channel in 2000.

An English dub of the series was produced beginning in 1994 by AnimEigo through Southwynde Studios in Wilmington, NC, and released to VHS and LaserDisc beginning that year. A digitally-remastered compilation, featuring bilingual audio tracks and production extras, was released on DVD in 2004 by AnimEigo. The company later successfully crowdfunded a collector's edition Blu-ray release through Kickstarter in November 2013. The series was released on a regular edition Blu-ray on September 25, 2018. The series is currently available for streaming on Night Flight Plus.

=== Soundtracks ===
There are eight soundtrack releases (one per OVA), as well as numerous "vocal" albums which feature songs "inspired by" the series as well as many drawn directly from it.

== Reception ==
Critical reception of Bubblegum Crisis has been positive, and has been regarded as one of the greatest cyberpunk anime of all time.

Raphael See of THEM Anime Reviews gave the series a rating of 4 out of 5 stars, praising the quality of the animation, the soundtrack, and the series' sense of humor. However, he suggested it was held back by a low quality dub, a lack of character development, and an inconsistent plot, saying that while some episodes were "really solid", others would leave out many major details, forcing the viewer to make their own assumptions: "Overall, not a bad watch. In fact, at times, Bubblegum Crisis can be really good. Unfortunately, oversights and carelessness here and there keep this series from being all it can be." Tim Henderson of Anime News Network gave the series an A− rating, praising the animation, soundtrack, story, and characters. He states that the series gets better with every passing episode, and that the final two episodes are the best of the series. Comic Book Resources listed Bubblegum Crisis as the ninth greatest cyberpunk anime series of all time, noting that the series "combines within itself everything that makes cyberpunk so tantalizing, its peerless aesthetics and chaotic storyline that manages to be both deep and bizarrely fun, making it a classic for the ages." Destructoid named Bubblegum Crisis the eighth best cyberpunk anime of all time.

The Encyclopedia of Science Fiction described Bubblegum Crisis as one of the most popular titles of the early wave of original video animation released in the West and considered it still enjoyable, although dated in several respects. It criticized the English dub's dialogue for weakening emotional and dramatic scenes and judged the songs performed by Pris to have aged poorly. The encyclopedia found the animation occasionally impressive, particularly in the first episode, but noted that it was constrained by budget limitations.

== Legacy ==
Masaki Kajishima and Hiroki Hayashi, who both worked on the Bubblegum Crisis OVAs, cite the show as being the inspiration for their harem series Tenchi Muyo! Ryo-Ohki. In an interview with AIC, Hayashi described Bubblegum Crisis as "a pretty gloomy anime. Serious fighting, complicated human relationships, and dark Mega Tokyo." They thought it would be fun to create some comedy episodes with ideas like the girls going to the hot springs, but it was rejected by the sponsors. He also said that there was a trend to have a bunch of characters of one gender and a single one of the other gender, and asked what if Mackey (Sylia's brother) was a main character, reversing the Bubblegum scenario. This idea then became the basis for Tenchi. Hayashi said that Mackey is "sort of" the original model for Tenchi.

Kevin Siembieda's becoming aware of "Boomers" being already in use in this caused him to change his planned name for the Rifts RPG which he had named after the "Boom Gun"–wielding power armor which was also renamed to Glitter Boy.

== Follow-ups ==
- AD Police Files is a three-part original video animation prequel produced by Youmex and animated by Artmic and AIC, released in 1990. It takes place in the original Bubblegum Crisis universe, and is a prequel to the original OVA series.
- Bubblegum Crash is a sequel to Bubblegum Crisis, released in 1991. It takes place one year after the events of Crisis and follows a dissolved Knight Sabers as they try to figure out their paths in life before being forced to join forces one more time to take down a powerful enemy.
- Bubblegum Crisis Tokyo 2040 is a 26-episode anime television series broadcast in 1998–1999. It is a reboot of the original series.
- A.D. Police: To Protect and Serve is 12-episode anime television series released in 1999. It is a prequel to Bubblegum Crisis Tokyo 2040.
- Parasite Dolls is a three-part original video animation series by AIC, released in 2003. It is set in the original Bubblegum Crisis universe, taking place after the events of the original OVA series.

=== Crossover appearances ===
In 1993, it appeared on Scramble Wars, a crossover event between Bubblegum Crisis, Gall Force, Genesis Survivor Gaiarth, AD Police and Riding Bean.

In 2023, the theme song "Konya Wa Hurricane" appeared in the series Scott Pilgrim Takes Off.

== Other media ==
=== RPGs ===
- Bubblegum Crisis role-playing game produced by R. Talsorian Games. It introduces an alternate setting named "Bubblegum Crossfire", basing on a premise that data units with hardsuit blueprints have been sent to more individuals than just Sylia Stingray, resulting in that by 2033 there are numerous Knight Saber-like groups spread all over the globe. RTG's license to produce this game has expired and at present all copies of back stock have been sold.
  - "Bubblegum Crisis: Before and After" (covering material from A.D. Police Files and Bubblegum Crash!)
  - "Bubblegum Crisis EX" which includes completely new materials (also incorporating early design concepts for BGC mecha and hardsuits as new variants)

=== Novels ===
The series' creator Toshimichi Suzuki wrote two novels:

- Bubblegum Crisis Vol. 1: Silent Fanfare, Fujimi Shobo
- Bubblegum Crisis Vol. 2: Break Down-48, Fujimi Shobo
- A third novel titled Bubblegum Crisis Hard Metal Guardians was also later written by Hajime Shima and released in 2012

=== Comic book ===
In Japan, a number of comic books were produced that featured characters and storylines based in the same universe. Some were very much thematically linked to the OVA series, while others were "one-shots" or comedy features. A number of artists participated in the creation of these comics, including Kenichi Sonoda, who had produced the original Knight Saber character designs. A North American comic based in the Bubblegum Crisis universe was published in English by Dark Horse Comics.

- Go! Go! Sabers!, a comic by Tokio Kazuka.
- AD. Police: 25:00, a comic by Tony Takezaki
- Soldier Blue, a comic by Toshimichi Suzuki. It serves as a prequel to Bubblegum Crash! It was also made as an audio drama. It was translated into English language in 1997 by R.Talsorian Games. A copy of the translated dialogue can be found here.
- Bubblegum Crisis: Grand Mal produced by Adam Warren via Dark Horse Comics.

=== Video games ===
- Crime Wave: a game for PC-88, set in Megatokyo and featuring Knight Sabers as the main characters.
- Bubblegum Crash: a game for TurboGrafx-16.

=== Live-action film ===
In May 2009 it was announced that a live-action film adaptation of Bubblegum Crisis was in the early stages of production. A production agreement was signed at the 2009 Cannes Film Festival. The film was expected to be released in late 2012 with a budget of 30 million. The production staff was said to have consulted with the original anime's staff members, Shinji Aramaki and Kenichi Sonoda, to help maintain consistency with the world of the original. However, no further developments have been announced.
