= Parasite Dolls =

2003 Japanese OVA anime series

- Parasite Dolls DVD cover in North America

パラサイトドールズ (Parasaito Dōruzu)
- Genre: Cyberpunk; Erotic thriller
- Original video animation
- Directed by: Yoshinaga Naoyuki; Nakazawa Kazuto
- Studio: AIC
- Licensed by: AUS: Siren Visual; NA: AEsir Holdings (formerly ADV Films); UK: ADV Films UK (expired)
- Released: May 22, 2003 – July 24, 2003
- Runtime: 30 minutes each
- Episodes: 3
- Related works
- Bubblegum Crisis; Bubblegum Crash; Bubblegum Crisis Tokyo 2040; AD Police Files; A.D. Police: To Protect and Serve; Bubblegum Crisis (role-playing game)
- icon

Parasite Dolls (パラサイトドールズ, Parasaito Dōruzu) is a 2003 three-part original video animation produced by AIC and Imagica Entertainment, and written by Chiaki J. Konaka and Kazuto Nakazawa. The series is set in the Bubblegum Crisis universe and takes place after the events of the original OVA series (ignoring Bubblegum Crash), from 2034 to 2040. It is set in Tokyo, and focuses on A.D. Police Lieutenant Basil "Buzz" Nikvest and his partner Reiko Michaelson, who work for the department's top-secret Branch unit. While investigating a rash of Boomer murders in the city, Buzz and Reiko uncover a conspiracy reaching all the way to the highest levels of the Japanese government, putting them and their teammates' lives in danger.

== Plot ==
Parasite Dolls is set in the original Bubblegum Crisis universe, taking place shortly after the events of the original OVA series. It is set in Tokyo, and focuses on the A.D. Police’s top-secret Branch unit. They are tasked with stopping terrorist activities as well as Boomers (androids) that have become harmful to society.

== Characters ==
Basil "Buzz" Nikvest
Lieutenant Basil "Buzz" Nikvest is a member of the Branch special task force of the AD Police. He was transferred to Branch in 2029 for mistakenly shooting a child he thought was a boomer. Due to his mistake he is reluctant to carry a sidearm, despite being a gifted marksman. He was made a widower when his wife was killed by a rogue boomer.^{Ep. 1, 3}
Reiko Michaelson
Sergeant Reiko Michaelson is the heavy weapons and vehicles expert in Branch who serves alongside Buzz. She flies a helicopter and is usually at the front lines for fighting Boomers.^{Ep. 1}
Kouji Takahashi
Kouji Takahashi is the Inspector in charge of Branch operations.^{Ep. 1} He was killed by Kenji Sorime during his coup attempt.^{Ep. 3}
Rod Kimball
Sergeant Rod Kimball is a Boomer who serves alongside Buzz in Branch.^{Ep. 1} While he cannot hold an official rank, he is treated as a Sergeant. He was also able to identify Reiko's romantic feelings for Buzz. He was killed after sacrificing himself to save Reiko from an oncoming missile.^{Ep. 3}
Elza "Angel" Lynch
Lieutenant Elza "Angel" Lynch is an undercover officer of Branch who spends most of her time investigating Genom. Angel used to be Buzz's girlfriend, and while the two of them had since broken up, she still remains on good terms with Buzz. She has silver hair and a dark complexion.^{Ep. 1} She was killed by Sorime during his coup attempt.^{Ep. 3}
Bill Myers
An electronics and computer hacker, Bill Myers serves as Branch's Boomer expert. The only person he seems to get along with is Buzz. ^{Ep. 1} He was killed by Sorime during his coup attempt.^{Ep. 3}

== Cast ==
Major cast
Character	Japanese	English
Basil "Buzz" Nikvest	Kazuhiko Inoue	Mike Vance
Reiko Michaelson	Akemi Okamura	Monica Rial
Rod Kimball	Soumei Uchida	Eric Chase
Kouji Takahashi	Masaru Ikeda	Mike Kleinhenz
Elza "Angel" Lynch	Kikuko Inoue	Heather LeMaster
Bill Myers	Toshio Furukawa	Mike McFarland

Minor cast
#	Character	Japanese	English
1	Chieko	Ai Orikasa	Shelley Calene-Black
1	Caine	Kouji Tsujitani	Lew Temple
1	Corbin	Tooru Ookawa	Rob Mungle
1	Buzz's wife	Rie Saitou	Tiffany Grant
1	Police Dispatch 1		Jay Hickman
1	Police Dispatch 2		Victor Carsrud
1	HQ Dispatch		Kevin Charles
1	Helicopter Pilot		John Gremillion
1	Thug Boomer		Rob Mungle
2	Eve	Mako Hyoudou	Stephanie Nadolny
2	Puppet Master	Jouji Nakata	James Reed Faulkner
2	Little Girl		Sasha Paysinger
2	Factory Manager		David Born
2	Detective		Gene Tognacci
2	Pimp		Mark Laskowski
2	Prostitute in Rain		Nancy Novotny
2	Boomer Prostitute		Shawn Taylor
2	Older Worker		John Swasey
2	Younger Worker		Robert Anderson
2	Bellhop 1		Jovan Jackson
2	Bellhop 2		Mark Laskowski
2	Bellhop 3		Victor Carsrud
2	Prostitutes		Tiffany Grant Sasha Paysinger
2	Eve's Client 1		Jay Hickman
2	Eve's Client 2		John Swasey
2	Police Dispatch		Nancy Novotny
3	Kenji Sorime	Yukimasa Kishino	Mike MacRae
3	Kojima	Toshihiko Nakajima	John Tyson
3	TV Interviewer		Tiffany Grant
3	Boomer Sex Slave		Nancy Novotny
3	TV News Anchor		Shawn Taylor
3	Pork Chop DJ	Koran Daniels	Kevin Charles
3	Police Chief		Gene Tognacci
3	Reporter		Matt Culpepper

Additional voices

Japanese: Kouichi Kuriyama, Hajime Iijima, Hiroaki Yoshida, Kenji Nomura, Mitsuru Ogata, Tadahisa Seizen, Toshitaka Shimizu, Yuko Kagata, Yuna Iwaki

English: David Born, Gene Tognacci, George Manley, James Reed Faulkner, Jay Hickman, John Gremillion, John Swasey, John Tyson, Jovan Jackson, Kevin Charles, Mark Laskowski, Matt Culpepper, Mike MacRae, Nancy Novotny, Rob Mungle, Robert Anderson, Sasha Paysinger, Shawn Taylor, Tiffany Grant, Victor Carsrud

== Episodes ==
No.	Title (Note: Titles for this series are in English.)	Directed by	Written by	Original release date
1	"A faint voice"	Naoyuki Yoshinaga, Yoashiro Geshi (unit); Naoyuki Onda (animation)	Chiaki Konaka	May 22, 2003
Set in 2034, Buzz Nikvest is an A.D. Police lieutenant working for the department’s top-secret Branch unit. He is called in on his day off to look at a package, where he and Branch tech analyst Bill Myers discover there will be an exchange at a strip club. There, Buzz discovers a dead body and a bag of capsule drugs, and is nearly killed by an attacking Boomer until Kimball, his Boomer partner, stops it. Despite orders from the higher ups to stop investigating, Buzz and Kimball discover the drugs were designed to prevent Boomers from going "rogue", or out of control. Sergeant Reiko Michaelson, who has been tracking down rogue Boomers on the highways, discovers that rogue Boomers have been transmitting information to a mysterious client. Meanwhile, Chieko, a sultry-voiced radio personality is confronted by her Boomer audio engineer Caine on her way home. Caine proposes to her but when she refuses, he becomes very agitated, chasing her to her apartment and pushing her down. Buzz and Kimball arrive and in the ensuing struggle, Chieko shoots Caine with Kimball’s gun.
2	"Dreamer"	Hitoshi Saga (unit); Koichi Hashimoto (animation)	Chiaki Konaka	June 25, 2003
In 2035, Branch is assigned to investigate a series of murders of Boomer prostitutes in Tokyo. Eve, a high-society Boomer prostitute, starts having recurring visions of a young girl in a red dress. Reiko goes undercover as a sex worker to look for the Hooker Boomer Crusher. Angel tells Buzz that the Crusher's master may be tied to Genom. Reiko follows Eve on her next job to a luxury hotel. After interrupting Eve and her client, Reiko discovers the Crusher is actually a stray cat she picked up on the streets which changes form into a larva and insect-like Boomer. Although Reiko easily destroys the Crusher, Eve is called away by the young girl and walks off a ledge to her death.
3	"Knights of a roundtable"	Kazuto Nakazawa (unit); Naoyuki Onda (animation)	Chiaki Konaka, Kazuto Nakazawa	July 24, 2003
In 2040, the A.D. Police are still investigating a rash of Boomer murders in Tokyo. Kenji Sorime, the Minister of Justice and a presidential candidate, tells Chief Takahashi in a fit of rage that he intends to destroy all Boomers, claiming they are the cause of society's problems. Takahashi goes missing shortly after and is presumed dead. Buzz has Reiko and Kimball search for him while Myers and Angel dig up information through hacking. As Reiko and Kimball are on a road trip to find information, a military helicopter ambushes them and fires a missile at their car. Reiko survives, but Kimball does not, as he sacrificed himself to protect her from the missile, which destroyed him along with the car. Then, hundreds of bombs detonate in Genom City, killing over 10,000 people and shutting down 90% of Boomer production. Buzz is framed for the attacks, the reason being that he submitted a paper in college on a domino theory on how to exploit Megatokyo’s emergency power system to trigger a chain reaction explosion, which Sorime read. Sorime has Angel, Takahashi and Myers killed, and Branch HQ destroyed. A few days later, Buzz confronts Sorime in his apartment, telling him video footage of the conspiracy will be revealed on the news, and warns that he will die soon. Sorime laughs it off and plans to kill Buzz, knowing he won't shoot back as he accidentally killed a young girl before and vowed to never use a gun again. However, Reiko shows up and kills Sorime. Buzz then honors his fallen partners by taking Reiko’s Glock 17 and shoots Sorime’s corpse four more times.

== Reception ==
Critical reception of Parasite Dolls has been generally positive. Nicole MacLean of THEM Anime Reviews gave the series a rating of 3 out of 5 stars. She found the installment to be "a good series that doesn't pull many surprises but does make a satisfying if sometimes a bit graphic watch. If one comes in without expectations of greatness and prepared for the violence, you'll likely enjoy it just fine." Browne recommended it for fans of cyberpunk, and also that it would be for mature teens and adults for its graphic violence and implicit sex.

Chris Beveridge of the Fandom Post found the audio and video for the collection to have no major issues, but disliked the cover artwork. He liked that the series featured some of the "dark underbelly" of the Bubblegum Crisis universe and without the bubblegum or the pop of the previous series and OVAs. He wrote: "This is a cop drama of a sort set in the future that tells three engaging tales and lets the third one really play with the world we’ve come to know. This is the kind of show I want to see as a series, not that other AD Police TV series. This is the good stuff."

Writing in the third edition of The Anime Encyclopedia (2015), Jonathan Clements and Helen McCarthy noted similarities between the protagonist of Parasite Dolls and Ross Sylibus from Armitage III, an earlier work by screenwriter Chiaki J. Konaka, particularly in their reluctance to cooperate with robotic partners. They also remarked on the unimaginative naming of the clandestine police division known as Branch.
