= Harasawa =

Harasawa (written: 原沢 or はらさわ in hiragana) is a Japanese surname. Notable people with the surname include:

- Hisayoshi Harasawa (原沢 久喜, born 1992), Japanese judoka
- Kōki Harasawa (はらさわ 晃綺, born 1971), Japanese voice actor
