= Youmex =

Anime production company and record label

Youmex (ユーメックス株式会社, Yūmekkusu Kabushiki Kaisha) was an anime production company and record label (under their label Futureland) established in 1985 as a subsidiary of Toshiba EMI and founded by Junji Fujita (formerly of King Records). The company was absorbed back into Toshiba EMI in 1998, after taking on debt defaulted on by Artmic.

Some of the more well-known works for which Youmex released soundtracks and other CDs (under its Futureland label) include Kimagure Orange Road (Sound Color 1–3, Loving Heart, etc.), Bubblegum Crisis (Complete Vocal Collections 1–2), and Nadia: The Secret of Blue Water (Vocal Collection).

In 1995, Youmex worked with Adam Warren through Dark Horse Comics and Artmic to come up with the original concept for Bubblegum Crisis: Grand Mal, an original English-language manga series.

As of 2024, The back catalog of Futureland label is being re-released by Universal Music Group.

== Productions ==
Listed in chronological order.

- Machine Robo: Battle Hackers (1987)
- Bubblegum Crisis (production, 1987–1991)
- Dragon's Heaven (production, 1988)
- Dennō Keisatsu Cyber Cop (1988–1989)
- Sonic Soldier Borgman (TV series 1988), (OVAs 1989–1993)
- Hades Project Zeorymer (production, 1988–1989)
- Be-Boy Kidnapp'n Idol (1989)
- Riding Bean (1989)
- Idol Densetsu Eriko (1989–1990)
- Earthian (production, with J.C.Staff, 1989–1996)
- A.D. Police Files (1990)
- Magical Angel Sweet Mint (1990–1991)
- Blazing Transfer Student (1991)
- Otaku no Video (1991)
- Slow Step (1991)
- Zettai Muteki Raijin-Oh (1991–1992)
- Idol Defense Force Hummingbird (1993–1995)
- Bubblegum Crisis: Grand Mal (original concept, 1995)
- Magic User's Club (1996)
- Ninja Cadets (1996)
- Baby and Me (1996–1997)
- Ultraman Dyna (1997–1998)
- Takoyaki Mantoman (1998–1999)
- Blue Gender (1999)
- Purple Eyes in the Dark (unknown, an image video which never reached full anime production status)

=== Soundtracks and other music ===
These were released under their label Futureland. Titles listed in chronological order.

- Fight! Iczer One (1985–1987)
- Prefectural Earth Defense Force (1986)
- Bubblegum Crisis (1987–1991)
- Kimagure Orange Road (1987–1988)
- Sonic Soldier Borgman (1988)
- Cleopatra DC (1989)
- Riding Bean (1989)
- Earthian (with J.C.Staff, 1989–1996)
- Nadia: The Secret of Blue Water (TV series and movie) (1989–1992)
- Iczer Reborn (1990–1991)
- Otaku no Video (1991)
- Slow Step (1991)
- Sequence (1992)
- Ushio to Tora (1992)
- Yaiba (1993–1994)
- Baby and Me (1996–1997)
- Fancy Lala (1998)
- Toriferuzu Mahō Gakuen Monogatari radio drama CD (part of the Eberouge game series, 1998)
- Karura Mau (unknown)
