= Andy McAvin =

American actor

- Born: Andrew Mark McAvin; January 4, 1952 (age 74); Denver, Colorado
- Occupation: Voice actor

Andrew Mark McAvin (born January 4, 1952) is an American voice actor with nearly 80 credits to his resume. He also appeared in over 120 professional theatrical productions including Broadway musicals. He does voice work in anime dubs for ADV Films and Seraphim Digital.

One of his most prominent roles was the genocidal villain Brian J. Mason in Bubblegum Crisis Tokyo 2040, the voice type of which is referred to by cast and crew-mates as the "slime that walks like a man" voice. He also did voice work for the AD Police: To Serve and Protect spin off and for Gamera 3: Revenge of Iris.

McAvin is also an instructor in powered paragliding, logging "over 4000 flights and several thousand hours" and has trained over 300 graduates. He is featured in a documentary called Into the Wind: The Sport of Powered Paragliding.

== Filmography ==
=== Anime voice roles ===
- Angelic Layer - Ichiro "Icchan" Mihara
- Area 88 - McCoy
- Azumanga Daioh - Kimura
- BASToF Syndrome - Mayor Hadim
- Broken Blade - Elekt
- Bubblegum Crisis Tokyo 2040 - Brian J. Mason
- Canaan - Cummings
- Chrono Crusade - Aion
- Cromartie High School - Akira Maeda
- Crying Freeman - Nicolaiv (ADV Dub)
- D.N.Angel - Kosuke Niwa
- Demon King Daimao - Peter Hausen
- E's Otherwise - Ghibelline
- Elfen Lied - Director Kakuzawa
- Full Metal Panic! - Richard Mardukas
- Gilgamesh - The Manager
- Horizon in the Middle of Nowhere - Motonobu Matsudaira
- Le Chevalier D'Eon - The Duke of Broglie
- Legend of the Mystical Ninja - Tsukasa's Father
- Loups=Garous - Riichiro Ishida
- Madlax - Eric Gillian
- Master of Mosquiton - Count Sangermaine
- Mardock Scramble - Oeufcoque Penteano
- Martian Successor Nadesico - Vice Admiral Hiroki Kusakabi
- Megazone 23 - BD
- Mezzo DSA - Kenichi Kurokawa
- Najica Blitz Tactics - Gento Kuraku
- Nerima Daikon Brothers - Prime Minister Oizumi
- Orphen - McGregor
- Pani Poni Dash! - Old Geezer
- Panyo Panyo Di Gi Charat - Deji Devil
- The Place Promised in Our Early Days - Tomizawa
- Princess Nine - Shinsaku Kido
- Princess Resurrection - Master
- RahXephon - Johji Futagami
- Saint Seiya - Narrator (ADV Dub)
- Saiyuki: Requiem - Go Dougan
- Science Ninja Team Gatchaman - Dr. Kozaburo Nambu (ADV dub)
- Short Peace - GONK-18 (A Farewell to Weapons), Shika's Husband (Gambo), Tsurunosuke (Combustible)
- Sin: The Movie - Vincenzo Manchini
- Slayers Great - Huey
- Spriggan - Jean Jacques Mondo
- Steel Angel Kurumi - Dr. Walski
- The Super Dimension Fortress Macross - Exedol Folmo
- Tactics - Imposter Goblin, Numata
- Those Who Hunt Elves - Salary Man Santa 2, The Mayor of Treetown
- A Tree of Palme - Fou
- Un-Go - Kichitarou Mitaka (Ep. 7)
- Utawarerumono - Chikinaro
- Vampire Hunter D - Rei-Ginsei, D's Left Hand (Sentai dub)
- Wandaba Style - Kōsaku Tsukomo
- Xam'd Lost Memories - Kanba
- Xenosaga: The Animation - Margulis

=== Non-anime voice roles ===
- My Beautiful Girl, Mari - Beard Man
- Halo Legends - Captain (The Package), The Boatman (The Duel)
- Lady Death: The Motion Picture - Pagan

=== Documentaries ===
- Into the Wind: The Sport of Powered Paragliding (2005 film by Chris Page) - Himself (Featured)
