= Anime International Company =

Japanese animation studio

Anime International Company, Inc.
- Native name: 株式会社アニメインターナショナルカンパニー
- Romanized name: Kabushiki-gaisha Anime Intānashonaru Kanpanī
- Type: Kabushiki gaisha
- Industry: Production company; Animation studio (formerly)
- Founded: July 15, 1982; 44 years ago
- Successor: Production IMS (AIC Spirits); Troyca (AIC Classic)
- Headquarters: Nerima, Tokyo, Japan
- Key people: Tōru Miura (CEO)
- Owner: Tōru Miura (97.56%)
- Divisions: AIC Asta; AIC Build; AIC Classic; AIC Digital; AIC Frontier; AIC Plus+; AIC Spirits; AIC Takarazuka (Note: All of them were dissolved.)
- Website: www.anime-int.com

AIC Rights Company, Inc.
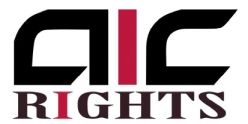
- Native name: 株式会社AICライツ
- Romanized name: Kabushiki-gaisha Ē-Ai-Shī Raitsu
- Type: Kabushiki gaisha
- Industry: Production company; Animation studio
- Founded: December 10, 2015; 10 years ago
- Headquarters: Chiyoda, Tokyo, Japan
- Key people: Masahiro Inoue (CEO)
- Total equity: ¥3,000,000
- Website: www.aic-r.com

Anime International Company, Inc. (Japanese: 株式会社アニメインターナショナルカンパニー, Hepburn: Kabushiki-gaisha Anime Intānashonaru Kanpanī), often abbreviated as AIC, is a Japanese animation studio founded on June 15, 1982, and located in Nerima, Tokyo, Japan. On December 10, 2015, AIC Rights Company, Inc. was established through a company split, in which AIC Rights received the transfer of some of the copyrights owned by Anime International Company.

Their notable works include series such as Tenchi Muyo!, Bubblegum Crisis, El Hazard, and several adaptations of the manga Oh My Goddess!.

AIC had eight sub-studios within itself, named: AIC Asta (2003, formerly: AIC A.S.T.A.), AIC Spirits (2003), AIC Digital (2003), AIC Plus+ (2006), AIC Takarazuka (2006), AIC Build (2010), AIC Classic (2010) and AIC Frontier (2012).

== History ==
In June 2006, a partnership was started with NTU for the development of the CACANI system, a software used as a tool in the animation process to generate fills between keyframes.

In September 2010, Oizumi Corporation acquired 95% of the studio from the ACA-managed investment fund MCP Synergy for 530 million yen. Also on the same day of the acquisition, AIC will buyback the remaining shares of the company held by TM Company. Together with the 5% share buyback from AIC, the studio subsequently became a wholly owned subsidiary of Oizumi Corporation.

In March of the following year, Aplix Corporation acquired all shares of the studio except AIC's treasury stock from Oizumi Corporation for 660 million yen, and AIC became a subsidiary of the company.

In February 2013, production producers of AIC Spirits quit the company and established an animation studio Production IMS. Also in May of that year, production producers of AIC Classic quit and founded the studio, Troyca.

On January 20, 2014, Aplix IP Holdings transferred all shares of AIC to Tōru Miura at 8,000 yen (1 yen per share).

In August 2015, former AIC animator Atsushi Okuda tweeted a post stating that AIC's production department had been disbanded.

In December 2015, Yasutaka Omura was appointed as the CEO of AIC. Also in the same month, AIC Rights Co., Ltd was established through a company split from AIC, in which AIC Rights received the transfer of some of the copyrights of the work of Anime International Company. Omura was appointed as the CEO of AIC Rights.

In February 2017, AIC Rights launched the "anime reboot projects" initiative to celebrate AIC's 35th anniversary.

On January 12, 2020, Omura announced his resigning from his CEO position at Anime International Company, although he remained as CEO of AIC Rights. Following Omura's resignation, Tōru Miura would return as CEO of AIC.

In April 2021, AIC Rights entered into a business alliance with Toei Agency, with the two companies going forward co-owning the copyrights to some of the intellectual property owned by AIC Rights.

In February 2022, Kenji Tsukamoto was appointed as the new representative director of AIC Rights, replacing Omura.

In October 2025, AIC Rights disclosed that its former shareholder, Anime International Company, filed a lawsuit against the company's former shareholder for the return of its shares in AIC Rights.

On July 3, 2026, Anime International Company announced their victory in the legal battle against AIC Rights and Yoshikazu Maeda regarding the return of AIC's shares in AIC Rights.

== Works ==
=== TV series ===
Title	First run start date	First run end date	Episodes	Note(s)
Lemon Angel	October 2, 1987	September 15, 1988	56	5-minute episodes. Co-produced with Anime-R.
Komatsu Sakyō Anime Gekijō	October 19, 1989	March 29, 1990	27	5-minute episodes. Co-produced with Gainax.
Tenchi Universe	April 2, 1995	September 24, 1995	26	Remake for television of the first six-episode story arc in Tenchi Muyo! Ryo-Ohki.
El-Hazard: The Wanderers	October 6, 1995	March 29, 1996	26	Simplified version of the original OVA storyline, stretched to twenty-six episodes and which eliminates or alters several of the OVA's major characters.
Magical Project S	October 4, 1996	March 28, 1997	26	Based on the Magical Girl Pretty Sammy character and the OVAs.
Tenchi in Tokyo	April 1, 1997	September 23, 1997	26	A reboot of the franchise set in a different timeline to both Ryo-Ohki and Universe.
Battle Athletes Victory	October 3, 1997	March 27, 1998	26	Retelling the story of Battle Athletes.
Vampire Princess Miyu	October 6, 1997	March 30, 1998	26	Adaptation of the manga series by Narumi Kakinouchi and Toshiki Hirano.
El-Hazard: The Alternative World	January 8, 1998	March 25, 1998	13	
Record of Lodoss War: Chronicles of the Heroic Knight	April 1, 1998	September 30, 1998	27	Based on the Record of Lodoss War fantasy novels by Ryo Mizuno.
Nightwalker: The Midnight Detective	July 9, 1998	September 23, 1998	12	A late night anime TV series created by Ayana Itsuki. Based on the Mayonaka no Tantei Night Walker PC game.
Bubblegum Crisis Tokyo 2040	October 7, 1998	March 31, 1999	26	Retelling the story of Bubblegum Crisis.
A.D. Police: To Protect and Serve	April 7, 1999	June 30, 1999	12	Sequel to A.D. Police Files.
Dual! Parallel Trouble Adventure	April 8, 1999	July 1, 1999	13 +OVA	An anime television series created by Masaki Kajishima.
Black Heaven	July 14, 1999	October 7, 1999	13	
Blue Gender	October 7, 1999	March 30, 2000	26	An anime television series created by Ryōsuke Takahashi.
Trouble Chocolate	October 8, 1999	March 24, 2000	20	
Now and Then, Here and There	October 14, 1999	December 30, 1999	13	An anime television series directed by Akitaro Daichi and written by Hideyuki Kurata.
Great Dangaioh	April 5, 2001	July 5, 2001	13	An anime television series created by Toshiki Hirano.
Tenchi Muyo! GXP	April 2, 2002	September 24, 2002	26	Sequel to Tenchi Muyo! Ryo-Ohki.
Petite Princess Yucie	September 30, 2002	March 24, 2003	26	Co-produced with Gainax.
Godannar	October 1, 2003	December 24, 2003	13	An anime series by Yasuchika Nagaoka. Co-produced with OLM, Inc. AIC ASTA
Battle Programmer Shirase	October 3, 2003	January 4, 2004	15	Co-produced with Gansis.
Burn-Up Scramble	January 12, 2004	March 29, 2004	12	Sequel to Burn-Up Excess by Magic Bus with entirely new series with some new and some old characters, and a very different art style. AIC Spirits
Godannar Second Season	April 5, 2004	June 28, 2004	13	Sequel to Godannar. Co-produced with OLM, Inc. AIC ASTA
Girls Bravo	July 7, 2004	April 21, 2005	24	Adaptation of shōnen manga series by Mario Kaneda. AIC Spirits
To Heart: Remember My Memories	October 2, 2004	December 25, 2004	13	Sequel to To Heart. Co-produced with OLM, Inc. AIC ASTA
Magical Canan	January 1, 2005	March 26, 2005	13	Adaptation of the magical girl eroge visual novel developed and published by Terios. AIC ASTA
Ah! My Goddess	January 6, 2005	July 7, 2005	26	Adaptation of the Oh My Goddess! manga series by Kōsuke Fujishima.
Gun × Sword	July 4, 2005	December 26, 2005	26	An anime television series is directed by Gorō Taniguchi and written by Hideyuki Kurata. AIC ASTA
SoltyRei	October 6, 2005	March 30, 2006	24	An anime series directed by Yoshimasa Hiraike. Co-produced with Gonzo.
Ah! My Goddess: Flights of Fancy	April 6, 2006	September 28, 2006	24	Sequel to Ah! My Goddess.
Sasami: Magical Girls Club	April 13, 2006	January 11, 2007	26	Based on the Magical Girl Pretty Sammy characters. AIC Spirits
Tokko	April 15, 2006	August 2, 2006	13	Adaptation of the manga series by Tōru Fujisawa. AIC Spirits
Pumpkin Scissors	October 2, 2006	March 19, 2007	24	Adaptation of the manga by Ryotaro Iwanaga. Co-produced with Gonzo.
Lovely Idol	October 2, 2006	December 18, 2006	12 +OVA	An anime adaptation of the Lovely Idol franchise. Co-production with TNK. AIC ASTA
Tokimeki Memorial Only Love	October 2, 2006	March 26, 2007	25 +2 DVD episodes	Based on Konami's popular Tokimeki Memorial dating simulation series. AIC ASTA
Tokyo Majin	January 19, 2007	October 10, 2007	28	Based on Japan-only video game series. Directed by Shinji Ishihira. AIC Spirits
My Bride Is a Mermaid	April 1, 2007	September 30, 2007	26	Adaptation of the manga series by Tahiko Kimura. Co-produced with Gonzo.
Bamboo Blade	October 1, 2007	March 27, 2008	26	Adaptation of the manga series by Masahiro Totsuka. AIC ASTA
Goshūshō-sama Ninomiya-kun	October 3, 2007	December 20, 2007	12	Adaptation of the manga series by Daisuke Suzuki. AIC Spirits
Moegaku★5	January 14, 2008	March 3, 2008	40	The 5 came from the use of five languages and its 5 p.m. broadcast schedule. AIC Spirits
S · A: Special A	April 6, 2008	September 14, 2008	24	Adaptation of the manga by Maki Minami. Co-produced with Gonzo.
Astro Fighter Sunred	October 3, 2008	March 27, 2009	26	Adaptation of the manga by Makoto Kubota. AIC ASTA
Ga-Rei: Zero	October 5, 2008	January 3, 2009	13	Adaptation of the Ga-Rei manga series by Hajime Segawa. AIC Spirits
Viper's Creed	January 6, 2009	March 24, 2009	12	An anime television series created by Sony Pictures Entertainment Japan. Co-produced with Digital Frontier. AIC Spirits
Samurai Harem: Asu no Yoichi	January 8, 2009	April 16, 2009	13	Adaptation of the manga series by Yū Minamoto.
GA Geijutsuka Art Design Class	July 6, 2009	September 1, 2009	12	Adaptation of the manga series by Satoko Kiyuzuki. AIC PLUS+
Nyan Koi!	October 1, 2009	December 17, 2009	12	Adaptation of the manga series by Sato Fujiwara.
Astro Fighter Sunred 2	October 3, 2009	March 27, 2010	26	Sequel to Astro Fighter Sunred. AIC ASTA
Heaven's Lost Property	October 4, 2009	December 27, 2009	13 +OVA	Adaptation of the manga series by Suu Minazuki. AIC ASTA
Whispered Words	October 7, 2009	December 30, 2009	13	Adaptation of the manga series by Takashi Ikeda.
Ōkami Kakushi	January 7, 2010	March 25, 2010	12	Adaptation of the visual novel by Konami.
Mayoi Neko Overrun!	April 6, 2010	June 29, 2010	13	Adaptation of the light novel by Tomohiro Matsu.
Amagami SS	July 2, 2010	December 23, 2010	26	Based on the Amagami dating simulation game.
Shukufuku no Campanella	July 2, 2010	September 17, 2010	12 +OVA	Based on a visual novel developed by Windmill.
Strike Witches 2	July 7, 2010	September 23, 2010	12	Sequel to Strike Witches by Gonzo. AIC Spirits
Cat Planet Cuties	July 10, 2010	September 25, 2010	12 +OVA	Adaptation of the light novel series by Okina Kamino. AIC PLUS+
Heaven's Lost Property: Forte	October 1, 2010	December 17, 2010	12	Sequel to Heaven's Lost Property (Sora no Otoshimono). AIC ASTA
Oreimo	October 3, 2010	December 19, 2010	15	Adaptation of the light novel series by Tsukasa Fushimi. AIC Build
Wandering Son	January 13, 2011	March 31, 2011	12	Adaptation of the manga series by Takako Shimura. AIC Classic
Nekogami Yaoyorozu	July 9, 2011	September 24, 2011	12 +OVA	Adaptation of the manga series by FLIPFLOPs. AIC PLUS+
R-15	July 10, 2011	September 25, 2011	12	Adaptation of the R-15 light novel series by Hiroyuki Fushimi.
Maken-ki!	October 5, 2011	December 21, 2011	12	Adaptation of the manga series by Hiromitsu Takeda. AIC Spirits
Haganai	October 7, 2011	December 23, 2011	13	Adaptation of the light novel series by Yomi Hirasaka. AIC Build
Persona 4: The Animation	October 7, 2011	March 30, 2012	25 +OVA	Based on the video game, Persona 4 AIC ASTA
Amagami SS+	January 5, 2012	March 29, 2012	13	Sequel to Amagami SS.
Place to Place	April 5, 2012	June 28, 2012	12 +OVA	Adaptation of the manga series by Ishiki.
Humanity Has Declined	July 2, 2012	September 17, 2012	12	Adaptation of the light novel series by Romeo Tanaka. AIC ASTA
Love, Election and Chocolate	July 6, 2012	September 28, 2012	12 +OVA	Adaptation of the Japanese adult visual novel developed by Sprite. AIC Build
Maji de Otaku na English! Ribbon-chan: Eigo de Tatakau Mahō Shōjo	July 31, 2012	November 16, 2013	12	Original anime that aims to teach English with cute girl characters. AIC Frontier
Haganai NEXT	January 11, 2013	March 29, 2013	12	Sequel to Boku wa Tomodachi ga Sukunai. AIC Build
Kotoura-san	January 11, 2013	March 29, 2013	12	Adaptation of the manga series by Enokizu. AIC Classic
Date A Live	March 31, 2013	June 16, 2013	12 +OVA	Adaptation of the light novel series by Kōshi Tachibana. AIC PLUS+
Space Battleship Yamato 2199	April 7, 2013	September 29, 2013	26	Joint production with Xebec on episodes 1–10.
Day Break Illusion	July 6, 2013	September 28, 2013	13 +OVA	An original anime series produced by AIC and Aniplex.
Maji de Otaku na English! Ribbon-chan: Eigo de Tatakau Mahō Shōjo - The TV	July 6, 2013	September 7, 2013	10	Sequel to Maji de Otaku na English! Ribbon-chan: Eigo de Tatakau Mahō Shōjo. AIC Frontier
Super Seisyun Brothers	September 13, 2013	December 13, 2013	14	Adaptation of the manga series by Shin Shinmoto. AIC PLUS+
Pupipō!	December 20, 2013	March 28, 2014	15	Adaptation of the manga series by Rensuke Oshikiri. AIC PLUS+
Ai Tenchi Muyo!	October 6, 2014	December 26, 2014	50 +10 recaps	Based on the Tenchi Muyo! franchise and sponsored by the city of Takahashi, Okayama in order to promote tourism for the city. AIC PLUS+
Battle Athletes Victory ReSTART!	April 11, 2021	June 27, 2021	12	Remake of the 1997 anime series Battle Athletes Victory. AIC Rights

=== Films ===
Title	Release date	Note(s)
Ai City	July 26, 1986	Co-produced with Ashi Productions.
Gall Force: Eternal Story	July 26, 1986	
Gall Force 2: Destruction	November 21, 1987	Sequel to Gall Force: Eternal Story.
Gall Force 3: Stardust War	November 2, 1988	Sequel to Gall Force 2: Destruction.
Rhea Gall Force	March 21, 1989	Sequel to Gall Force 3: Stardust War.
Silent Möbius: The Motion Picture – Part I	August 17, 1991	Adaptation of the Silent Möbius manga series by Kia Asamiya.
Silent Möbius: The Motion Picture – Part II	July 18, 1992	Adaptation of the Silent Möbius manga series by Kia Asamiya.
Elementalors	April 1, 1995	Adaptation of the manga series by Takeshi Okazaki.
Tenchi Muyo in Love	April 20, 1996	The first of three films set in the Tenchi Muyo! multi-verse. The film takes place after the conclusion of Tenchi Universe.
Armitage: Poly-Matrix	June 25, 1996	Feature-length edit of Armitage III.
Tenchi the Movie: The Daughter of Darkness	August 2, 1997	The 2nd of three films set in the Tenchi Muyo! multi-verse directed by Tetsu Kimura and written by Naoko Hasegawa.
Tenchi Forever!	April 24, 1999	The final of three films set in the Tenchi Muyo! multi-verse.
Welcome to Lodoss Island!	April 25, 1998	
Ah! My Goddess: The Movie	October 21, 2000	
Armitage: Dual-Matrix	March 22, 2002	Sequel to Armitage III.
Blue Gender: The Warrior	November 20, 2002	The compilation movie of Blue Gender.
Heaven's Lost Property the Movie: The Angeloid of Clockwork	June 25, 2011	Based on a manga and anime series Heaven's Lost Property. AIC ASTA
Strike Witches: The Movie	March 17, 2012	The film adaptation of Strike Witches.
Persona 4: The Animation -The Factor of Hope-	June 9, 2012	A film recap of the Persona 4: The Animation.
Aura: Koga Maryuin's Last War	April 13, 2013	AIC ASTA
Persona 3 The Movie: No. 1, Spring of Birth	November 23, 2013	Based on the Persona 3 video game by Atlus. AIC ASTA

=== OVAs ===
Title	Release start date	Release end date	Episodes	Note(s)
Fight! Iczer One	October 19, 1985	March 4, 1987	3	Based on a comic by Aran Rei.
Legend of Lyon Flare	July 14, 1986	April 21, 1990	2	
Cosmos Pink Shock	July 21, 1986	July 21, 1986	1	Based on the 1984 serial on the "Animevision" video magazine.
Call Me Tonight	July 28, 1986	July 28, 1986	1	
Outlanders	December 16, 1986	December 16, 1986	1	Produced by AIC on behalf of Tatsunoko Production and is not listed on Tatsunoko's web site.
Wanna-Be's	December 25, 1986	December 25, 1986	1	Co-produced with Artmic.
Campus Special Investigator Hikaruon	January 28, 1987	January 28, 1987	1	
Bubblegum Crisis	February 25, 1987	January 30, 1991	8	Co-produced with Artmic.
Maryū Senki	March 5, 1987	July 25, 1989	3	
New Cream Lemon	March 21, 1987	March 21, 1988	9	
Pants no Ana: Mambo de Ganbo!	May 9, 1987	May 9, 1987	1	
Black Magic M-66	June 28, 1987	June 28, 1987	1	Adaptation of the manga by Masamune Shirow. Co-produced with Animate Film and Artmic.
Dangaioh	September 28, 1987	July 25, 1989	3	Co-produced with Artmic.
Daimajū Gekitō: Hagane no Oni	December 10, 1987	December 10, 1987	1	
Metal Skin Panic MADOX-01	December 16, 1987	December 16, 1987	1	Co-produced with Artmic.
Dragon's Heaven	February 25, 1988	February 25, 1988	1	
Spirit Warrior	April 29, 1988	May 25, 1994	5	Co-produced with Studio 88 and Madhouse. Adaptation of the manga series by Makoto Ogino.
Ten Little Gall Force	July 3, 1988	July 3, 1988	1	An animated mockumentary detailing a behind-the-scenes look at the production of Gall Force: Eternal Story and Gall Force: Destruction from the First Story Arc.
Vampire Princess Miyu (OVA)	July 21, 1988	April 1, 1989	4	Adaptation of the manga series by Narumi Kakinouchi and Toshiki Hirano.
Dragon Century	October 26, 1988	December 25, 1988	2	An anime OVAs created by Ryuukihei.
Hades Project Zeorymer	November 26, 1988	February 21, 1990	4	Adaptation of the manga series by Chimi Morio. Co-produced with Artmic.
Riding Bean	February 22, 1989	February 22, 1989	1	Adaptation of the manga by Kenichi Sonoda.
Explorer Woman Ray	May 26, 1989	June 23, 1989	2	
Legend of Lemnear	July 25, 1989	July 25, 1989	1	
Megazone 23 Part III	September 28, 1989	December 22, 1989	2	Co-production with Artmic. Sequel to Megazone 23 Part II by Artland.
Cybernetics Guardian	November 1, 1989	November 1, 1989	1	
Be Boy Kidnapp'n Idol	December 22, 1989	December 22, 1989	1	
Gall Force: Earth Chapter	December 25, 1989	December 1, 1990	3	Sequel to Rhea Gall Force.
Sol Bianca	March 21, 1990	May 17, 1991	2	
Ryokunohara Labyrinth: Sparkling Phantom	March 25, 1990	March 25, 1990	1	
Guy: Double Target	April 4, 1990	July 15, 1992	2	Co-produced with Studio Max.
A.D. Police Files	May 25, 1990	November 22, 1990	3	Prequel to Bubblegum Crisis. Co-produced with Artmic.
Iczer Reborn	September 25, 1990	February 25, 1991	6	
The Hakkenden	October 25, 1990	March 25, 1991	6	Based on the epic novel Nansō Satomi Hakkenden by Kyokutei Bakin.
Demon Warrior Luna Varga	March 20, 1991	September 20, 1991	4	
Burn Up!	March 21, 1991	March 21, 1991	1	
Detonator Orgun	August 25, 1991	April 25, 1992	3	Co-produced with Artmic.
Gall Force: New Era	December 1, 1991	February 26, 1992	2	Sequel to Gall Force: Earth Chapter.
Genesis Survivor Gaiarth	April 22, 1992	April 28, 1993	3	Co-produced with Artmic.
Super Dimensional Fortress Macross II: Lovers Again	May 21, 1992	November 21, 1992	6	Sequel to The Super Dimension Fortress Macross by Artland and Tatsunoko.
Sekai no Hikari Shinran Seijin	June 1992	March 5, 1999	6	
Ai no Kusabi	August 1, 1992	May 1, 1994	2	Adaptation of the novel by Rieko Yoshihara.
Bastard!!	August 25, 1992	June 25, 1993	6	Adaptation of the manga by Kazushi Hagiwara.
Tenchi Muyo! Ryo-Ohki	September 25, 1992	May 28, 2021	30	
Scramble Wars	October 28, 1992	October 28, 1992	1	A humorous Japanese take on Wacky Races in which characters from several major series produced by Artmic - Bubblegum Crisis, Gall Force, Genesis Survivor Gaiarth, among others - compete for a trillion dollar-heavy trophy sponsored by the megacorporation Genom.
Green Legend Ran	November 25, 1992	March 25, 1993	3	
Oh My Goddess!	February 2, 1993	May 17, 1994	5	Adaptation of the manga series by Kōsuke Fujishima.
Moldiver	February 25, 1993	November 25, 1993	6	
Kishin Corps	March 24, 1993	August 25, 1994	7	Adaptation of the light novels by Masaki Yamada.
Ganbare Goemon: Jigen Jō no Akumu	March 26, 1993	March 26, 1993	1	First OVA based on the Goemon game franchise, created by Etsunobu Ebisu.
The Hakkenden: A New Saga	November 25, 1993	March 25, 1995	7	Sequel to The Hakkenden.
Iczer Girl Iczelion	January 27, 1995	March 24, 1995	2	An anime OVAs created by Toshihiro Hirano.
Armitage III	February 25, 1995	November 25, 1995	4	
Magical Girl Pretty Sammy	March 24, 1995	August 24, 1997	3	Based on the magically transformed version of the Sasami character from the various Tenchi Muyo! series.
El-Hazard: The Magnificent World	May 26, 1995	January 25, 1996	7	
Ninja Cadets	March 27, 1996	June 12, 1996	2	Co-produced with Youmex.
Burn-Up W	April 10, 1996	September 26, 1996	4	Sequel to Burn Up!.
Tattoon Master	April 26, 1996	August 23, 1996	2	
El-Hazard: The Magnificent World 2	March 21, 1997	October 25, 1997	4	Sequel to El-Hazard: The Magnificent World.
Mahou no Shiho-chan	October 25, 1996	June 27, 1997	2	
Battle Athletes	May 25, 1997	June 25, 1998	6	
Photon	November 21, 1997	February 18, 1999	6	
Virgin Fleet	April 25, 1998	October 25, 1998	3	
Twin Bee Paradise	December 18, 1998	April 25, 1999	4	
Sol Bianca: The Legacy	September 24, 1999	May 25, 2000	6	Based on the original Sol Bianca.
Kaitō Ranma: The Animation (or Samurai: Hunt for the Sword)	November 26, 1999	December 23, 1999	2	
G-Taste	December 18, 1999	April 24, 2003	7	Adaptation of the erotic manga series by Hiroki Yagami. Produced by Green Bunny.
Oni-Tensei	April 25, 2000	September 25, 2000	3	
Yarima Queen	June 25, 2000	June 25, 2000	1	
Zoku Gosenzo San'e	October 25, 2000	April 25, 2001	4	
Devadasy	November 25, 2000	January 25, 2001	3	Co-produced with Studio Gazelle.
Magical Play 3D	December 29, 2001	December 29, 2001	1	Retells the Magical Play story.
Parasite Dolls	May 22, 2003	July 24, 2003	3	The series, set directly after the events of Bubblegum Crisis, focuses on the "Branch" division of the A.D. Police.
Tenbatsu! Angel Rabbie	January 23, 2004	January 23, 2004	1	AIC Spirits
Ah! My Goddess: Fighting Wings	December 12, 2007	December 12, 2007	2	Oh My Goddess!'s 20th anniversary special.
Quiz Magic Academy	September 12, 2008	September 12, 2008	1	AIC PLUS+
Tenchi Muyo! War on Geminar	March 20, 2009	March 19, 2010	13	A spin-off of the Tenchi Muyo! series created by Masaki Kajishima. AIC Spirits
Quiz Magic Academy - The Original Animation 2	February 11, 2010	February 11, 2010	1	Sequel to Quiz Magic Academy. AIC PLUS+
G-Best	November 22, 2010	November 22, 2010	1	AIC PLUS+
Megane na Kanojo	November 25, 2010	November 25, 2010	4	Adaptation of the manga by Tobi.
Ah! My Goddess: Together Forever	February 23, 2011	August 23, 2013	3	OVAs bundled with volumes 42, 43 & 46 of the Oh My Goddess! manga.
Nana to Kaoru	March 29, 2011	March 29, 2011	1	Adaptation of the manga series by Ryuta Amazume. AIC PLUS+
Gattai Robot Atranger	December 29, 2011	December 29, 2011	1	
Justeen	December 29, 2011	December 29, 2011	1	
Ai no Kusabi 2012	January 18, 2012	April 18, 2012	4	Remakes of Ai no Kusabi series.
Ebiten: Kōritsu Ebisugawa Kōkō Tenmonbu Specials	November 30, 2012	March 29, 2013	5	AIC Classic
Angel's Drop	May 12, 2013	May 12, 2013	1	AIC Frontier
Seitokai no Ichizon Lv.2: Watasu Seitokai	July 5, 2013	July 5, 2013	1	An anime OVA bundled with the 8th volume of the Seitokai series spin-off novel.
Tenchi Muyo GXP Paradise Starting	May 26, 2023	October 27, 2023	6	Co-production with Saber Project, in cooperation with Saber Works and Zero-G

=== ONAs ===
Title	Release start date	Release end date	Episodes	Note(s)
Magical Play	November 16, 2001	May 3, 2002	24	
Candy☆Boy: Side Story For Archive	May 2, 2008	May 8, 2009	1	An ONA series directed by Takafumi Hoshikawa. Sequel to Candy Boy Episode: EX01 - Mirai Yohouzu
Candy Boy: Nonchalant Talk of the Certain Twin Sisters in Daily Life + Candy Boy Episode: EX01 - Mirai Yohouzu	May 2, 2008+August 13, 2008	May 8, 2009 +August 13, 2008	7 ONA + 1 OVA	Sequel to Candy Boy: Nonchalant Talk of the Certain Twin Sisters in Daily Life + Sequel to Candy☆Boy: Side Story For Archive AIC Digital
Kigurumikku V3	April 5, 2009	July 16, 2009	3	AIC ASTA
Oreimo Specials	February 22, 2011	May 31, 2011	4	An alternate ending version of Ore no Imōto ga Konna ni Kawaii Wake ga Nai TV series (episode 12 to 15). AIC Build
Ebiten: Kōritsu Ebisugawa Kōkō Tenmonbu	July 14, 2012	September 15, 2012	10 +OVA	Adaptation of the manga series created by SCA-ji. AIC Classic
Seitokai no Ichizon Lv.2	October 13, 2012	December 15, 2012	10	Sequel to Seitokai no Ichizon. Based on a light novels by Aoi Sekina.

=== Outsourced productions ===
Title	Release date	Note(s)
Captain Power and the Soldiers of the Future: Future Force Training	1987	
Captain Power Bio Dread - Strike Mission	1987	
Captain Power and the Soldiers of the Future: Raid on Volcania	1987	

=== Specials ===
Title	Release start date	Release end date	Episodes	Note(s)
Candy Boy Episode: EX02 - Shiawase Kyouyuu Riron	June 24, 2009	June 24, 2009	1	AIC Digital

=== Tokusatsu ===
Title	Release start date	Release end date	Episodes	Note(s)
Sentika F8ABA6 Jisariz (First Season)	May 7, 2023	July 22, 2023	12	Original work. Co-production with Siest. AIC Rights
Gemeos Cube of the Universe	September 28, 2024	September 28, 2024	1	Cooperating company. Original movie by Akihiro Tanabe and DTR Promotion. AIC Rights
Sentika F8ABA6 Jisariz (Second Season)	July 11, 2025	TBA	TBA	Sequel to Sentika F8ABA6 Jisariz. Co-production with Siest. AIC Rights

=== Video games ===
Title	Release date	Publisher	Platform(s)
Basted	October 21, 1994	NEC Avenue	PC Engine Super CD-ROM²
Policenauts	September 29, 1995	Konami	3DO, PlayStation, Sega Saturn
Grandia	December 18, 1997	Entertainment Software Publishing, Sony Interactive Entertainment, GungHo Online Entertainment, Ubisoft.	Sega Saturn, PlayStation, Nintendo Switch, Windows
Myth II: Soulblighter	December 28, 1998	Bungie	Windows, Mac, Linux
Evil Zone	January 14, 1999	Yuke's Future Media Creators (Japan), Titus Software (International)	PlayStation
Oni	January 28, 2001	Bungie, Gathering of Developers (PC), Rockstar Games (PS2)	Windows, Mac, PlayStation 2
Time Hollow	March 19, 2008	Konami	Nintendo DS
Suikoden Tierkreis	December 18, 2008	Konami	Nintendo DS

== See also ==
- Artmic, former Japanese studio that originally produced a lot of titles that AIC now owns.
