= Bubblegum Crisis Tokyo 2040 =

1998 cyberpunk anime television series

- Cover to ADV Films DVD Collection release

バブルガムクライシス TOKYO 2040 (Baburugamu Kuraishisu TOKYO 2040)
- Genre: Cyberpunk; Action
- Created by: AIC
- Anime television series
- Directed by: Hiroki Hayashi
- Produced by: Shigeaki Komatsu; Hiroaki Inoue; Shōichi Kumabe
- Written by: Chiaki J. Konaka; Sadayuki Murai
- Music by: Kōichi Korenaga
- Studio: AIC
- Licensed by: AUS: Madman Entertainment; NA: FUNimation Entertainment; UK: ADV Films UK (expired)
- Original network: TV Tokyo
- English network: AU: SBS; US: Encore Action The Anime Network
- Original run: October 8, 1998 – March 31, 1999
- Episodes: 26
- Related works
- Bubblegum Crisis; Bubblegum Crash; AD Police Files; A.D. Police: To Protect and Serve; Parasite Dolls; Bubblegum Crisis (role-playing game)
- icon

Bubblegum Crisis Tokyo 2040 (バブルガムクライシス TOKYO 2040, Baburugamu Kuraishisu TOKYO 2040) is a 1998 Japanese cyberpunk anime television series produced by AIC. It is a reboot of the 1987 OVA series Bubblegum Crisis. It focuses on the Knight Sabers, a rogue vigilante group led by billionaire Sylia Stingray and three other women who use powered suits to fight rogue Boomer robots made by the megacorporation Genom, which has awakened an extremely powerful Boomer prototype made by Sylia's father that possesses the ability to destroy all life on Earth.

Bubblegum Crisis Tokyo 2040 premiered on TV Tokyo on October 8, 1998, where it ran until its conclusion on March 31, 1999. Toshiba EMI released the series on VHS and Laserdisc across 13 volumes, each containing two episodes. The first volume was released on January 21, 1999; the final volume was released July 26, 2000. The series was later released on DVD, however the Japanese versions were simply the American DVD releases encoded to play for Region 2.

The series was positively received by critics, with some deeming it an improvement over the original OVA series.

== Plot ==
Like its predecessor, Bubblegum Crisis Tokyo 2040 takes place primarily in Tokyo. Much of the manual labor in the city is done by robots called Boomers, which are run by the high-tech mega-corporation Genom.

While spending a night out, Linna Yamazaki, a new employee at the Hugh-Geit Corporation (a Genom subsidiary), observes a rogue Boomer causing destruction and attacking people. The AD Police arrive stop the rogue Boomer, but they struggle to restore order. Then, a renegade group called the Knight Sabers dressed in cybernetic, armored Hardsuits appear and save the day. Impressed by their work, Linna decides to join the Knight Sabers, which consists of Priscilla "Priss" S. Asagiri, a rock star; Sylia Stingray, a boutique store owner and the group's leader; and Nene Romanova, a computer hacker and AD Police dispatch operator who serves as the group's mole in that organization.

Over the course of the series, the Knight Sabers destroy countless rogue boomers, which frustrates AD Police officers Leon McNichol and his partner Daley Wong, as well as Genom chairman Quincy Rosenkreutz, and his advisor Brian J. Mason, who are working to unlock more boomer technology to defeat and capture the Knight Sabers. Sylia's younger brother Mackie, who is part-boomer, joins the Knight Sabers as an assistant alongside their lead mechanic, Nigel Kirkland. Leon later pursues Priss with romantic intentions, and despite learning that she is a member of the Knight Sabers, they both confess their feelings for one another anyway.

Later on, Mason uncovers and reactivates Galatea, an extremely powerful humanoid made by Sylia's father that is based on Sylia's DNA, which possesses the ability to control all Boomers and wipe out all life on Earth. The Knight Sabers' hardsuits break down as a result of Galatea's reactivation, and Sylia is forced to get Nigel and Mackie to build new ones based on liquid metal. Mason has Quincy killed and takes over Genom. He then cuts AD Police's funding, resulting in a strike. Galatea's influence causes boomers across Tokyo to go rogue, forcing the Knight Sabers and AD Police out of their own buildings. The Japanese government then orders a complete evacuation of Tokyo, the AD Police are shut down, and the Knight Sabers are forced to use Nigel's workshop as their new base of operations. Mackie later malfunctions and is presumed dead due to Galatea's influence. Galatea then becomes too powerful for even Genom to control, as she subsumes Genom Tower and kills Mason. The Knight Sabers arrive to try to stop Galatea, but they are unsuccessful and Sylia suffers severe injuries from fighting her.

After retreating, Sylia retires from being an active member and sends Priss, Linna, and Nene to a Genom space station orbiting Earth to stop Galatea using the Motoslave that Nigel developed. As Galatea subsumes the space station, Linna and Nene are overwhelmed and are forced to retreat back to Earth, crash-landing on a deserted island. Priss confronts Galatea, but Galatea's influence causes her hardsuit to badly malfunction and transform into a boomer, subjecting her to extreme torture. However, Priss overcomes Galatea's mental influence and summons the Motoslave, destroying Galatea, but falls out into space afterwards. Galatea then uses the last of her strength to save Priss and send her back to Earth as a showing of respect.

After Galatea's defeat, Mackie is revived and reconciles with Sylia and Nigel. Linna and Nene are seen trapped on a deserted island without any clothes and both wonder if they'll ever be rescued. Priss lands in a vast desert, and sings a song she had planned to perform with her band.

== Characters ==
Many of the characters are similar to those in the OVA series.

The members of the Knight Sabers, as seen in Bubblegum Crisis Tokyo 2040: Sylia (top), Nene (left), Linna (right), Priss (bottom)

Priscilla S. Asagiri (プリス・S・アサギリ, Purisu Esu Asagiri)

- Voiced by: Yu Asakawa (Japanese); Christine Auten (English)

Priscilla "Priss" S. Asagiri is the strongest member of the Knight Sabers, specializing in heavy assault. The Japanese-American vocalist of an underground rock band, she lives in the slums of Tokyo in a trailer truck and is a distrustful loner who is rarely seen with her fellow Knight Sabers. A.D. Police officer Leon McNichol is attracted to her, but she initially mocks him. As the series progresses, her view changes as they both encounter each other in various dangerous situations and they help each other. She also begins to become more friendly with her fellow team mates, though she always retains some distance with them and is very protective of her privacy.
Linna Yamazaki (リンナ・ヤマザキ, Rinna Yamazaki)

- Voiced by: Rio Natsuki (Japanese); Kelly Manison (English)

Linna was a farm girl who traveled to Megatokyo to become a Knight Saber and to get away from her overbearing family. She is the only member of the Sabers that is not a Hafu. She works for the Hugh-Geit Corporation, a Genom subsidiary, and is constantly harassed by her bosses and co-workers but continues to be a positive, friendly, and outgoing person who dreams of helping others. It was her confrontational tendencies and sense for justice which eventually got her admitted to the Knight Sabers. After joining the team, she forms a close sisterly relationship with Nene.
Sylia Stingray (シリア・スティングレイ, Shiria Sutingurei)

- Voiced by: Satsuki Yukino (Japanese); Laura Chapman (English)

An enigmatic billionaire, and the founder of the Knight Sabers, Sylia is the daughter of Dr. Katsuhito Stingray, the man who invented Boomers. She is a Hafu of British descent. Implants in her brain were used to create both Galatea and Mackie and her brain patterns were used in the creation of Boomers thus strongly relating her to boomers, but she sees them as an abomination as her mother did. She acts as ground support for the Knight Sabers. She is in love with Nigel Kirkland, a sullen mechanic who was an engineer on the Boomer project who helped her design and build the hard suits. Sylia owns and operates an upscale clothing boutique called Silky Doll, which also serves as a front for the Knight Sabers HQ. Sylia suffers from regular flashbacks; most stem from her extremely complicated and disturbing childhood involving her mother's death and the cruel experiments her father conducted on her. She rarely dons her hardsuit or enters combat.
Nene Romanova (ネネ・ロマノーヴァ, Nene Romanōva)

- Voiced by: Hiroko Konishi (Japanese); Hilary Haag (English)

An 18-year-old perky and naïve hacker who works as an operator for the AD Police, Nene is a genius with computers and routinely hacks into military networks. She is a Hafu of Russian descent. Nene was hired by Sylia after hacking her computer to try and learn more about the Knight Sabers. She primarily works on sensor ops, battlefield communications, ECM and ECCM. As the series progresses, Mackie develops a crush on her, despite the fact that she is three years older than him and part-boomer. The two eventually become good friends, with hints of a romantic relationship developing between them.
Leon McNichol (レオン・マクニコル, Reon Makunikoru)

- Voiced by: Kiyoyuki Yanada (Japanese); Jason Douglas (English)

An AD Police officer from America, Leon is a frustrated but dedicated cop, with a tendency to rush in without thinking. Having worked his way up from the Normal Police, Leon sees himself as the protector of the local citizens and initially dislikes the vigilante nature of the Knight Sabers. He meets and becomes a big brother figure for Nene and falls in love with Priss. He is unaware of her being a Knight Saber until later in the series, but when he learns the truth he keeps it to himself. At the end of the series, Priss returns his feelings.
Daley Wong (デイリー・ウォン, Dirī Won)

- Voiced by: Yūji Ueda (Japanese); Chris Patton (English)

Daley is Leon's partner, and a highly skilled investigator who actively questions the contradictory nature of the A.D. Police's relationship with the Knight Sabers. He is Chinese-American and also openly homosexual, which is worth noting because at the time the original OVA was produced male homosexual characters were quite rare in anime. Towards the end of the series, he disappears without explanation, although it is likely that he chose to evacuate the city after he helps ensure that the boomer menace cannot spread any further.
Nigel Kirkland (ナイジェル・カークランド, Naijeru Kākurando)

- Voiced by: Ken Yamaguchi (Japanese); John Gremillion (English)

A former Genom engineer from America, Nigel worked on the Boomer Project with Sylia's father and Brian J. Mason, then later helped Sylia design and build the hard suits. Now a mechanic, he helps maintain the hard suits. He is romantically involved with Sylia, but because of his quiet, sullen nature he is called the "man of a thousand grunts" by other characters and his true feelings for Sylia are unknown. Macky becomes his protege and one of the few people Nigel seems to consider a friend. At the beginning of the series, Priss appears to be infatuated with him, though he does not react to her flirtations. However, he later creates a "Motoslave" (motorcycle that can transform into an exoskeleton for Priss's hardsuit) specifically for her that, using Nigel's voice, says it wishes to protect Priss. Both Priss and Sylia are attracted to Nigel, however, Nigel never showed preference for either one. However, Sylia was more emotionally desperate to have Nigel and Priss gave up on Nigel since she has Leon. Nigel would later build more advanced hardsuits based on liquid metal for the ladies in their battle against the boomers and eventually Galatea.
Mackie Stingray (マッキー・スティングレイ, Makkī Sutingurei)

- Voiced by: Kouki Miyata (Japanese); Spike Spencer (English)

Mackie was initially introduced as Sylia's younger brother, however, he's actually a male doppelganger version of Sylia. Created by Sylia's father, in his quest for advancing artificiality, Mackie is neither fully human nor boomer; he's a prototype that was deemed too human and considered a failure. However, he wasn't discarded and was kept around to be a false little brother to Sylia and she accepted Mackie as such. Mackie is depicted as being a naïve, inquisitive and awkward young man who loves machinery and computers; due to his artificial nature, he can never age and remains forever in his mid-teens form. After surviving the infamous earthquake, Mackie reunited with Sylia and walked right into her Knight Saber Operation. Although reluctant at Mackie's infatuation with machinery and getting involved in her affairs, she eventually accepted it and allowed him to tag along with the Knight Sabers and eventually formed a good relationship with Nene and Nigel. As the series progresses, his origins was revealed as well as his connection with Galatea.
Brian J. Mason (ブライアン・メイスン, Buraian Meisun)

- Voiced by: Jōji Nakata (Japanese); Andy McAvin (English)

A ruthless corporate shark who works against the wishes of Chairman Quincy, Mason believes the human race should go away and that Boomers should become the new dominant species and uses Genom's spaceborne solar generator and earthborne energy storage project to search for the underground laboratory that housed the Sotai project (Galatea). He once worked on that boomer project with Sylia's father and Nigel Kirkland. Because of his traumatizing past, he is a bitter man. He adopted Galatea in hopes of using her. To fulfill his wish, in a manner he does not want, she changes him into a Boomer-Human hybrid, then fuses him into a wall to be hung up high above Megatokyo so that he can observe Galatea's plans for Tokyo and the world, but he dies shortly after.
Quincy Rosenkroitz (クインシー・ローゼンクロイツ, Kuinshī Rōzenkuroitsu)

- Voiced by: Tadashi Nakamura (Japanese); John Swasey (English)

The GENOM Chief Executive Officer, Quincy wishes for humans and Boomers to live together peacefully. Though suspicious of Mason's activities, he believes he can control and maintain Mason. With his body badly decayed, he uses tubes and wires to keep him alive, afraid of using more advanced implants. Mason's boomer secretary later kills him by disconnecting a vital cord in his life-support system. He shares his surname with Christian Rosenkreuz, legendary founder of the Rosicrucians.
Kusui (クズイ, Kuzui)

- Voiced by: Takehiro Murozono (Japanese); Lew Temple (English)

Kuzui is a double-agent inside GENOM who passed information to Sylia in exchange for money, but was also aiding Mason in his search for Galatea. He is willing to sell his services to the highest bidder and states that he has no ethics. On Mason's orders, he tells Sylia about the search for Galatea so that she could find it for Mason. Shortly afterwards, Mason has him killed.
Galatea (ガラテア, Garatea)

- Voiced by: Yui Horie (Japanese); Laura Chapman (adult), Kira Vincent-Davis (child) (English)

Galatea is a secret Boomer Project started by Sylia's father, Dr Stingray. She becomes the main antagonist of the series. It is revealed in a flashback that she was grown from an implant inserted into a young Sylia's brain against Sylia's mother's wishes. When it was discovered she possessed the capability to destroy all life on Earth, Dr. Stingray tried to force her back into stasis, but she kills him, forcing Genom CEO Quincy Rosenkroitz to use an emergency device to cause the Great Kanto Earthquake in order to seal her and prevent her from contaminating boomers for her own designs. When she is initially seen, she has an appearance like that of a prepubescent Sylia. She is released from stasis by Mason and rapidly matures from her childlike appearance to an adult almost identical to Sylia. After her plan to wipe out the human race is revealed, her hair turns black and her eyes change to red. Late in the series, her mind begins maturing and she begins questioning the meaning and purpose of her existence. At the end of the series, Priss defeats her, and Galatea, as a showing of respect, saves Priss's life and sends her back to Earth.

== List of Hardsuits ==
Hardsuits are powered battle armour developed by Sylia Stingray and Nigel Kirkland. Initially they are suits of armour that the four Knight Sabers step into while wearing body stockings as close contact with skin and "plumbing" connections are required. Sylia states that the reason there are no male Knight Sabers is because it was easier to find women who shared a similar shape to her than to redesign hardsuits for a different anatomy. After the original suits were lost, the replacement suits are instead applied to the naked women as a viscous liquid silver-coloured 'biometal' that morphs into the coloured hardsuit. The new hardsuits and the Motoslave are revealed late in the series to be a form of Boomer, and the very first set of suits (not seen in the series) were all lost due to their wearers not being well suited for their use and that Sylia had to find people like her whose consciousness could meld with the Boomers' nascent consciousness (itself based on Sylia's consciousness due to her father's development process) in order to optimize their function. This requirement is revealed when the Knight Sabers receive psychic messages from Galatea and at times the four women are sometimes able to communicate telepathically. Sylia notes that the highly limited power supply of the hardsuits was to prevent them going rogue.

Priss's Hardsuit is specifically designed for the alley-style, hit and run fighting tactics she prefers. Her red-accented dark blue suit's main weapon is a set of "knuckle bombs". These are essentially shaped-charge explosive devices on the knuckles of her gauntlets, with which she beats against a Boomer until she can tear inside where its "core" (its heart) resides and destroy it from the inside out. Until Linna's arrival, Priss was the primary combatant of the team and it is her suit that is used in Linna's first test simulation.

Linna's hardsuit is a green color accented with orange trim, and is extremely maneuverable. As the newest suit of the group, it has some of the most advanced features, including a pair of long, ribbon-like cutters with nanometer-thick mono-molecular edges that can slice through almost anything. This newness is a double-edged sword however, for it fails on its first mission with almost tragic consequences for its owner. Linna's suit also has heavily armored gauntlets, but she does not carry the knuckle bombs that Priss's suit has.

Designed more for field support and data acquisition than for combat, Nene's hardsuit is a reddish-pink and purple. Her weaponry includes a railgun that can shoot high sectional density armor-piercing metal spikes into her opponents, armored gauntlets, and an incredibly powerful computer system and scanner array that lets her handle almost any field intelligence operations required of her. Nene tries to prove herself as a fighter several times but overestimates her physical prowess and endangers herself and others. Eventually her suit is upgraded with several automatic functions that greatly increase her ability as a fighter.

Sylia's Hardsuit is not often seen in the series, as Sylia does not engage in actual combat as often as the other Knight Sabers due to her health. However, when she does, her hardsuit is equipped with a retractable Katar (कटार) style sword blade that she uses to inflict fatal damage to any Boomer, and her combat style is even more savage and brutal than Priss'. Her suit is primarily a silver/white color with teal and pink accents. It also sports active stealth systems, and she is known to carry remote-detonating explosive charges.

== Media ==
=== Episode list ===
Each episode was named after an album or song by a rock/punk band. Many songs were also the title tracks of their respective albums and thus shared the same name as the album. The songs were never played in the episodes themselves. Two pieces of theme music are used for the series. The opening and ending themes, respectively titled "y'know" and "Waiting for YOU", are performed by Akira Sudou.

The twenty-six episode anime series is directed by Hiroki Hayashi and features character designs by Hidenori Matsubara and Masaki Yamada. It premiered in Japan on October 7, 1998, and aired weekly until December 23, 1998. The remaining twelve episodes premiered on January 13, 1999, with new episodes airing weekly until the series concluded on March 31, 1999. Episodes 25 and 26 were unaired and instead along with the original video animations (OVAs), were released directly to VHS and laserdisc. The series was licensed for English-language broadcast and distribution in English by AD Vision and premiered their English dubbed version of the series on August 24, 1999.

As of November 3, 2010, the series has been re-licensed by Funimation, currently known as Crunchyroll.

No.	Title	Directed by	Written by	Original release date
1	"Can't Buy a Thrill"	Akihiko Nishiyama	Chiaki J. Konaka	October 7, 1998
2	"FRagiLE"	Takehiro Nakayama	Chiaki J. Konaka	October 14, 1998
3	"Keep Me Hanging On"	Kenichi Yatani	Chiaki J. Konaka	October 21, 1998
4	"Machine HeaD"	Hideaki Hisashi	Chiaki J. Konaka	October 28, 1998
5	"Rough and Ready"	Kenichi Yatani	Chiaki J. Konaka	November 4, 1998
6	"Get it On"	Hayato Date	Chiaki J. Konaka	November 11, 1998
7	"Look at Yourself"	Sanbi Mujou	Chiaki J. Konaka	November 18, 1998
8	"Fire Ball"	Takeyuki Yanase	Chiaki J. Konaka	November 25, 1998
9	"My Nation Underground"	Kazunori Tanahashi	Sadayuki Murai	December 2, 1998
10	"Woke Up with A MONSTER"	Shigeki Awai	Sadayuki Murai	December 9, 1998
11	"SHEER HEART ATTACK"	Kaoru Suzuki	Chiaki J. Konaka	December 16, 1998
12	"Made In Japan"	Tadashi Oda	Chiaki J. Konaka	December 23, 1998
13	"Atom Heart Mother"	Satoshi Saga	Sadayuki Murai	January 13, 1999
14	"Shock Treatment"	Hidetoshi Yoshida	Sadayuki Murai	January 20, 1999
15	"Minute by Minute"	Kaoru Suzuki	Chiaki J. Konaka	January 27, 1999
16	"I SuRRendeR"	Kazunori Tanahashi	Chiaki J. Konaka	February 3, 1999
17	"Moving Waves"	Masahiro Hosoda	Sadayuki Murai	February 10, 1999
18	"We Built This City"	Satoshi Saga	Sadayuki Murai	February 17, 1999
19	"Are YOU ExperienceD?"	Hayato Date	Chiaki J. Konaka	February 24, 1999
20	"One of thesE Night"	Yukihiro Shino	Chiaki J. Konaka	March 3, 1999
21	"Close to the Edge"	Tōru Yoshida	Sadayuki Murai	March 10, 1999
22	"Physical Graffiti"	Minoru Nakagawa	Sadayuki Murai	March 17, 1999
23	"Hydra"	Makoto Fuchigami	Chiaki J. Konaka	March 24, 1999
24	"Light My Fire"	Hayato Date	Chiaki J. Konaka	March 31, 1999
25	"Walking On The Moon"	Yukihiro Shino	Chiaki J. Konaka	Unaired
26	"Still Alive And Well"	Yasuhiro Geshi	Chiaki J. Konaka	Unaired

=== Episode title references ===
1. "Can't Buy a Thrill" (album by Steely Dan)
2. "Fragile" (album by Yes and the name of a song by Sting, and an album by Dead or Alive)
3. "Keep Me Hanging On" (song by The Supremes from the album The Supremes Sing Motown; covered by Vanilla Fudge and Kim Wilde, among others)
4. "Machine Head" (album by Deep Purple, also the name of a thrash metal band and a song by the band Bush)
5. "Rough and Ready" (album by Jeff Beck)
6. "Get It On" (song by T. Rex; covered by The Power Station, various bands have also released songs with the same title)
7. "Look at Yourself" (album by Uriah Heep, also the title track of the same album)
8. "Fireball" (album by Deep Purple, also the title track of the same album)
9. "My Nation Underground" (album by Julian Cope)
10. "Woke up with a Monster" (album by Cheap Trick, also the title track of the same album)
11. "Sheer Heart Attack" (album by Queen, also the name of a song from the Queen album News of the World)
12. "Made in Japan" (album by Deep Purple)
13. "Atom Heart Mother" (album by Pink Floyd; also the title track of the same album, a six-part suite)
14. "Shock Treatment" (song by The Ramones from the album Leave Home, also the title track from the musical film of the same name)
15. "Minute by Minute" (album by The Doobie Brothers, also the title track of the same album)
16. "Surrender" (song by Cheap Trick from the album Heaven Tonight)
17. "Moving Waves" (album by Focus, also the title track of the same album)
18. "We Built This City" (song by Starship from the album Knee Deep in the Hoopla)
19. "Are You Experienced?" (album by Jimi Hendrix, also the title track of the same album)
20. "One of These Nights" (album by The Eagles, also the title track of the same album)
21. "Close to the Edge" (album by Yes, also the title track of the same album)
22. "Physical Graffiti" (album by Led Zeppelin)
23. "Hydra" (album by Toto, also the title track of the same album and the name of a southern rock band)
24. "Light My Fire" (song by The Doors from the album The Doors)
25. "Walking on the Moon" (song by The Police, from the album Reggatta de Blanc)
26. "Still Alive and Well" (album by Johnny Winter)

== Reception ==
Critical reception of Bubblegum Crisis Tokyo 2040 has been generally positive, with some deeming it an improvement over the original OVA series. Jason Bustard of THEM Anime Reviews gave the series a rating of 4 out of 5 stars, calling it a fitting tribute to the original Bubblegum Crisis. He praised the story, music, and character designs, deeming them an improvement upon the original series. He also praised the character development, stating that "lots of detail went into humanizing the various cast members. From Nene's snack habits, to Priss's icy mercenary attitude, to Linna (best known from the original for her acrobatic green hardsuit) tripping all over herself the first time she tries on her suit, the characters shine with personality; a big improvement over the somewhat distant characters of the OVA."

Tim Henderson and Theron Martin of Anime News Network praised the series. Henderson gave the series a rating of B−, stating that "Bubblegum Crisis Tokyo 2040 is a difficult beast to heartily recommend, but it's hardly a show to ward potential viewers away from either." Henderson handed out praise the character designs, animation, and story, but criticized the opening episodes for being slow, and the ending for not being very original. Martin gave the series a higher rating of B+, handing out praise for the story, character designs, character development, soundtrack, and the English dub, but criticized the ending, stating that "the pseudo-philosophizing which is especially prevalent near the end gets to be a little much."

Benjamin Wright of Animerica gave Bubblegum Crisis Tokyo 2040 a positive review, handing out praise for the character development, soundtrack, animation, and story, stating that "2040 exchanges the OAVs' breakneck pace for a more gradual, ominous feeling, and dopes the atmosphere with the sense of a coming storm."
