= Green Legend Ran =

Japanese OVA series

- The cover of the Green Legend Ran DVD release.
- グリーンレジェンド乱; Gurīn Rejendo Ran
- Type: OVA
- Directed by: Satoshi Saga
- Screenplay by: Yuu Yamamoto
- Character designer: Yoshimitsu Oohashi
- Music by: Yoichiro Yoshikawa
- No. of episodes: 3

Production
- Art director: Ken Arai
- Sound director: Yasunori Honda
- Cinematographers: Takao Narusawa (1); Kazuhiro Konishi (2–3)
- Color designers: Yasuko Yamaguchi (1); Naoko Kodama (2–3)
- Editor: Matsuo Editing Room
- Animation producer: Kinya Watanabe (2–3)
- Studios: MTV (1); AIC (2–3)
- Producers: Hisao Yamada; Yoshiaki Aihara (1); Tooru Miura (2–3)
- Production companies: Pioneer LDC
- Runtime: 45–55 minutes

Original release
- Release: November 25, 1992 – March 25, 1993

Green Legend Ran (グリーンレジェンド乱, Gurīn Rejendo Ran; also known as simply The Green Legend) is a three-part OVA series released in 1992 and 1993. It is drawn in a style similar to Final Fantasy: Legend of the Crystals (with Key Animators Kenji Teraoka and Yoshiharu Shimizu in-common) and directed by Satoshi Saga. In the U.S., the OVA was licensed and distributed by Geneon (then known as Pioneer) in 1994 on VHS and laserdisc format, and later in 1998 on DVD (it was one of their initial DVD releases). Sentai Filmworks has rescued the OVA following Geneon's demise and released it on February 21, 2017.

== Plot ==
Green Legend is set in a science fiction-style post-apocalyptic Earth, which has turned largely into a vast desert after an alien invasion, in which six of the "Rodo" (a race of what appear to be giant monoliths) crashed onto Earth from space, somehow affecting massive climate change which has completely wiped out the oceans and rain. At the time, mankind was ruining the environment, making an apocalypse of some sort inevitable (similar to other environmentally-focused anime like Nausicaä of the Valley of the Wind; in general style, Green Legend is much like Nadia: The Secret of Blue Water and Future Boy Conan).

In this brutal new world, two polarized factions have arisen: the first faction, the "Rodoists", are a fanatical religious sect who worship the Rodo while practicing hydraulic despotism; all communities are clustered around one of the monoliths, as they are the only remaining sources of water and food - most of which is gathered quite close to the monoliths in what they call the "Holy Green". Travel between communities is infrequent, as at a certain distance from the monoliths, the environment peters out to the point that the air itself cannot be breathed - necessitating pressurized vehicles akin to spaceships. The second faction, the "Hazard", is a secretive revolutionary movement opposed to the Rodoists.

The protagonist (Ran the greener) is a young orphaned boy who seeks to survive, to join the Hazard, and to find and take revenge upon the man with a scar on his chest who killed his mother. He blunders into the middle of a battle between the Hazard and the Rodoists, during which he meets a strange silver-haired girl named Aira. Ran helps some Hazard scouts escape his town and joins them. Soon, the Rodoist army attacks the Hazard base; Aira is forcibly evacuated against her will by the Hazard. Ran attempts to board the sand ship, but fails, and begins pursuing it across the desert in a stolen pressure suit. He is rescued by traveling water and food merchants just before his air runs out. The merchant leader, a contemplative man named Jeke, offers Ran his assistance in rescuing Aira. The rescue goes awry when the Rodoists attack the Hazard sand ship and recapture Aira as Ran and the merchants attempt to infiltrate the same sand ship.

== Reception ==
In 500 Essential Anime Movies, Helen McCarthy called Green Legend Ran "a well designed, attractively animated series that should be rewarding and entertaining for children".

The Encyclopedia of Science Fiction described Green Legend Ran as a good anime with some well-animated science fiction elements, but criticized its conventional and largely ineffective protagonist. It observed that Ran, despite being the title character, has surprisingly little influence on the plot, failing to achieve his intended revenge or deliberately prevent the antagonist's plans. The encyclopedia also noted that the other principal male characters similarly fail to accomplish their goals, questioning whether this was an intentional narrative choice or merely a device to generate action. It nevertheless considered their contrasting perspectives a source of depth in an otherwise somewhat clichéd story, and suggested that Aira, rather than Ran, might be regarded as the true protagonist, with Ran functioning primarily as her romantic interest.
