= Michitaka Kobayashi =

Japanese voice actor

Michitaka Kobayashi (小林 通孝, Kobayashi Michitaka, born August 28, 1955 in Mobara, Chiba) is a Japanese voice actor. For a time, he was known as Sanshirō Nitta (新田 三士郎, Nitta Sanshirō). He currently works for Aoni Production.

== Voice roles ==
=== Television ===
- Atashin'chi (????) (Mizushima Husband)
- Digimon Xros Wars (????) (Angemon)
- Mirai Keisatsu Urashiman (????) (Ryuu)
- Ginga: Nagareboshi Gin (????) (Jinnai)
- Legend of the Galactic Heroes (????) (Tonio)
- One Piece (????) (Yasopp)
- Saint Seiya ((????) Libra Dohko)

=== Film ===
- Saint Seiya: The Movie (????) (Sagitta Maya)
- One Piece Film: Red (2022) (Yasopp)
