= BASToF Lemon =

South Korean animated series

- Written by: Young-ah Choi
- Country of origin: South Korea
- Original language: Korean
- No. of seasons: 1
- No. of episodes: 26

Production
- Producers: Young-moon Min; Seung-ok Kye
- Cinematography: Tae Hee Heo
- Editor: Young-min Lee
- Running time: 24 minutes
- Production companies: KBS; Dong Woo Animation

Original release
- Network: KBS
- Release: 2001

BASToF Lemon (Korean: 사이버 영혼 바스토프 레몬) is a South Korean animated series, which ran for 26 episodes in 2001. "BASToF" stands for "Be A Stranger To Fear."

The show was formerly licensed by ADV Films who dubbed and released the show as BASToF Syndrome on six DVD volumes from May to November 2004, holding on to the license until its shutdown in 2009. It is currently unlicensed.

== Plot ==
The setting of the story is the year 2097AD, the place the city of Xenon. An ultimate cyber game, where players fight as biomech cyber robots, has been developed. However, there's something wrong: the game's cyberspace and the real world are linked, thus the damage done in the game's cyberspace creates real destruction in the city of Xenon. This all started when players heard a painful scream, saw a ghostly face, and a powerful scent of lemon overcame them. To solve this mystery, the creator of the game assembles a "Dream Team," which is the top three gamers in all of Xenon. The team is composed of rebellious and arrogant teens, who have to overcome their attitudes and fears to find the answers, answers to the mystery that is much bigger than just the game.

This animation parodies the MMORPG or Massively Multiplayer Online Role-Playing Game.

== Characters ==
- Pseudo (슈도) (voiced by Won-Hyeong Choi in Korean and Jason Douglas in English)
- Mint (민트) (voiced by Song Do-yeong in Korean and Cynthia Martinez in English)
- Bewefau (베베파우) (voiced by Ja-Hyeong Gu in Korean and Chris Patton in English)
- Moderato (모데라토) (voiced by Mun Gwanil in Korean and Illich Guardiola in English)
- Cora (코라) (voiced by Hui Seon-Kim in Korean and Kim Prause in English)
- Tiel (티엘) (voiced by Hui Seon-Kim in Korean and Luci Christian in English)
- Bomb (밤) (voiced by In-Suk Han in Korean and Greg Ayres in English)
- Pudding (푸딩) (voiced by Hyun-Sun Lee in Korean and Kira Vincent-Davis in English)
- Pluto (플루토) (voiced by Seung-Seop Hong in Korean and Chris Ayres in English)
- Hadim (하딤) (voiced by Seol Yeongbeom in Korean and Andy McAvin in English)

== Awards ==
- A good film in Film section of 2nd quarter for Digital Content in 2001 by Ministry of Information & Communication, Maeil Economic Newspaper
- Bronze medal at 2001 Digital Contents Competition (Korea IT Industry Promotion Agency)
- Top 100 for Digital Innovation in 2001 by Hankuk Daily Newspaper
- Best TV series in "Korean Cartoon Competition" sponsored by Ministry of Culture & Tourism
