= Kiyoshi Kawakubo =

Japanese voice actor (1929–2019)

Kiyoshi Kawakubo 川久保潔
- Born: November 18, 1929; Yokohama, Kanagawa, Japan
- Died: April 16, 2019 (aged 89)
- Occupation: Voice actor
- Years active: 1952–2019
- Agent: 81 Produce

Kiyoshi Kawakubo (川久保潔, Kawakubo Kiyoshi; November 18, 1929 – April 16, 2019) was a Japanese voice actor. He was from Yokohama, Japan.

Kiyoshi was part of 81 Produce.

== Notable roles ==
=== TV drama ===
- Tokugawa Ieyasu (1983) (Torii Mototada)
- Dokuganryū Masamune (1987) (Sirakawa Yoshichika)

=== Anime television ===
- 3000 Leagues in Search of Mother (Pietro Rossi)
- Cyborg 009 (Van Allen (ep. 35))
- D.Gray-man (Kevin Yeegar)
- Detective Conan (Kanaya (ep. 57, 58))
- Heisei Tensai Bakabon (various roles)
- Kimba the White Lion (Bou)
- King Fang (Youichiro)
- Lupin III Part II (Bordeaux police chief (ep. 12))
- O-bake no... Holly (Moppusu)
- Onegai! Samia Don (Samiadon)
- Science Ninja Team Gatchaman (various roles)
- Paranoia Agent (Fuyubachi)
- Salaryman Kintarō (Tomokazu Morinosuke)
- Science Ninja Team Gatchaman F (various roles)
- Silent Möbius (Grospoliner)
- Tengen Toppa Gurren Lagann (Guame the Immoveable)
- Tottoko Hamtaro (Chairman Inatori)
- Trigun (Max)
- Uchuusen Sagittarius (various roles)
- Zero Tester (Dr. Tachibana)

=== OVAs ===
- Bubblegum Crisis (Quincy)
- Cybernetics Guardian (Folkes)
- Genesis Survivor Gaiarth (Zoniac (ep. 2))
- Master Keaton (Colonel Fox (ep. 38–39))
- Spirit Warrior (Father Takahata (ep. 3))
- Ten Little Gall Force: Super Deformed Double Feature (Quincy)
- Ys (Dares)
- Legend of the Galactic Heroes Gaiden (1998) ((Baron von Keyserling (ep. 9–12)))

=== Films ===
- Alakazam the Great (Kinkaku)
- Arabian Nights: Sinbad's Adventures (Great King Torfa)
- Cyborg 009 (Biggle)
- Doraemon: Nobita and the Animal Planet (Delegration leader)
- Silent Möbius (Grospoliner)
- Slayers Great (Lord Haizen)
- Tezuka Osamu Story: I am Son-Goku (Wan-Raimin)
- Wanpaku Ouji no Orochi Taiji (various roles)

=== Drama CDs ===
- Banana Fish ("Papa" Dino Golzine)

=== Video games ===
- The Bouncer (Wong Leung)

=== Dubbing ===
==== Live-action ====
- Jim Broadbent
  - Bullets over Broadway (Warner Purcell)
  - Bridget Jones's Diary (Mr. Colin Jones)
  - Bridget Jones: The Edge of Reason (Mr. Colin Jones)
  - Bridget Jones's Baby (Mr. Colin Jones)
- Diff'rent Strokes (Phillip Drummond)
- Dr. Dolittle (Mr. Calloway (Peter Boyle))
- The Great Escape (Col von Luger)
- Indiana Jones and the Temple of Doom (Captain Philip Blumburtt (Philip Stone))
- Jack Reacher (Martin Cash (Robert Duvall))
- The Phantom of the Opera (The Phantom (Herbert Lom))
- The Rock (Chief Justice (Philip Baker Hall))
- Wild Wild West (2002 NTV edition) (US Marshal Coleman (M. Emmet Walsh))

==== Animation ====
- The Aristocats (Edgar)
- The Perils of Penelope Pitstop (Silverster Sneakly AKA The Hooded Claw)
- Robin Hood ("Prince" John)
- The Swan Princess series (Puffin)
- Zoom the White Dolphin (Mickaël)
