= Kōki Harasawa =

Japanese voice actor

- はらさわ 晃綺
- Born: December 4, 1971 (age 54); Gunma Prefecture, Japan
- Other name: Katsuhiro Harasawa
- Occupation: Voice actor
- Years active: 1990–present
- Agent: Ken Production

Kōki Harasawa (はらさわ 晃綺, Harasawa Kōki; born December 4, 1971) is a Japanese voice actor from Gunma Prefecture, Japan. He is affiliated with Ken Production.

== Filmography ==
=== Anime ===
- Assassination Classroom (Takuya Muramatsu)
- Blue Drop (Kanseikan)
- Brave Witches (Kōhei Karibuchi)
- Dies Irae (Rot Spinne)
- Fantastic Children (Hemas)
- Hamatora: The Animation (Sōichi Nashidaira)
- Hikarian: Great Railroad Protector (E2 Jet)
- Hungry Heart: Wild Striker (Yūjirō Kamiyama)
- Kaze no Stigma (Lai)
- Magikano (Hajime Hario)
- Mars Daybreak (Bronson)
- Melody of Oblivion (Kuron)
- My Bride Is a Mermaid (Maguro)
- Papuwa (Doctor Takamatsu)
- Petopeto-san (Ryūta Katō)
- RahXephon (Yōhei Yomoda)
- Samurai Deeper Kyo (Bikara, Maki)
- Slap-up Party: Arad Senki (Bikan)
- Space Battleship Yamato 2199 (Shinpei Iwata)

=== Original video animation ===
- Canary (Yasuo Shinjō, Yūji Yahagi)
- Hunter x Hunter: Greed Island (Binolt)
- Street Fighter Alpha (Rolento Schugerg)

=== Theatrical animation ===
- RahXephon: Pluralitas Concentio (Yōhei Yomoda)
- Space Battleship Yamato 2199: Odyssey of the Celestial Ark (Shinpei Iwata)

=== Video games ===
- Canary (Yasuo Shinjō, Yūji Yahagi)
- Dies irae ~Amantes amentes~ (Rot Spinne)
- The Legend of Zelda: Spirit Tracks (Chancellor Cole)
- Luminous Arc 2 (Moose)
- Routes (Eddie)
- Suikoden IV (Bartholomew, Gau)

=== Dubbing ===
- The 51st State (Iki)
- Black Hawk Down (PVT John Waddell)
