= Tony Takezaki =

Japanese manga artist

Tony Takezaki (トニーたけざき, Tonī Takezaki) is a Japanese mangaka born on July 15, 1963, in Osaka.

== Selected bibliography ==
=== Manga ===
- A.D. Police 25:00 (1988)
- A.D. Police: Dead End City (1989–1990)
- Dr Kishiwada's Scientific Affection (1991–1998)
- Genocyber (1993)
- Space Pinchy (2002)
- Tony Takezaki's Gundam Comic (2004–2010)
- Tony Takezaki's Neon Genesis Evangelion (2010)
