= Bubblegum Crisis (role-playing game) =

1996 role-playing game

Bubblegum Crisis is a near-future cyberpunk role-playing game published by R. Talsorian Games in 1996 that is based on the anime television series Bubblegum Crisis.

== Publication history ==
R. Talsorian Games (RTG) had originally been founded by Mike Pondsmith in 1986 to publish the anime role-playing game Mekton. RTG then went on to other non-anime products such as Cyberpunk 2020. It was not until ten years later, in 1996, that RTG re-entered the anime-related role-playing game market with Bubblegum Crisis, which would be the first RPG produced among several anime properties licensed by the company. In his 2011 book Designers & Dragons, author Shannon Appelcline noted that this was the first game to use the company's new Fuzion rule system, and said the game "marked a new push into anime for the company, bringing it back to its roots".

Three books in total were printed in this series; "Bubblegum Crisis: Mega-Tokyo 2033" (the base rulebook, set in the original OVA series), "Bubblegum Crisis: Before and After" (content from the spin off "AD Police" series as well as the "Bubblegum Crash!" sequel series) and "Bubblegum Crisis EX" (cutting room floor content and new adventures).

== Description ==
Bubblegum Crisis is a 188-page softcover book designed by Benjamin Wright, David Ackerman-Gray, Ray Greer, George MacDonald, Steve Peterson, and Mike Pondsmith. In the game, set in Japan in 2033, players take on the roles of "Knight Sabers" who oppose the evil megacorporation Genom and its deadly Boomer robots.

The book is divided into three sections:

1. An introduction to role-playing and the Fuzion rule system
2. A 2033 sourcebook, explaining how the world arrived at its present situation, as well as chapters on Knight Sabers, Genom, Boomers and technology
3. Advice to referees on how to create plots and campaigns, with several short adventures given as examples.

== Gameplay ==
=== Character creation ===
A player can create a character's personality and worldview using random die rolls, or simply select them. The player then distributes a limited number of stat points amongst the abilities of Strength, Intelligence, Reflexes, and Willpower. A set of secondary characteristics — Luck, Resistance, and Endurance — are derived from the primary abilities. The player finishes the character by spending a limited number of campaign points on Skills, Talents & Perks, and equipment. A character can gain more Campaign Points by choosing one or more Complications.

=== Action resolution ===
To determine the success of a given action, the gamemaster assigns a Difficulty Level to the task which then defines a Target Number. The player rolls three 6-sided dice, and adds the character's relevant ability and skill rating. If the total equals or surpasses the Target Number, the action succeeds.

== Reception ==
In the Christmas 1996 edition of Arcane (Issue 14), Andy Butcher commented on the "stunning visuals and its amazing designs of technology." However, he pointed out that role-playing is not, by its nature, a visual medium, and "it's going to be hard to replace this vital element." Butcher concluded by giving the book an average rating of 7 out of 10, saying, "For fans of Bubblegum Crisis, this is probably a dream come true, and you'll almost certainly love it. Those with less experience in Japanese anime may find it all a bit overwhelming and difficult to get across to their players, though."

In the November 1997 edition of Dragon (Issue #241), Rick Swan thought the game "combines clever mechanics, a flashy setting, and an interesting premise." Swan also liked the "sharp writing and generous number of examples". Pointing out that this was a game that "favors simple adventures as opposed to intricate campaigns", he suggested that Bubblegum Crisis would work best with short scenarios such as the ones included in the book. He concluded by giving the book an average rating of 4 out of 6.

== Reviews ==
- Shadis #29
- Backstab #2
- Casus Belli #101
