= Adam Warren bibliography =

Adam Warren is an American comic book writer and artist who is famous for being one of the first American commercial illustrators to draw using the manga style.

== Bibliography ==
=== Major works ===
Title	Role	Publisher	Year
The Dirty Pair: Biohazards	Artist and writer	Eclipse Comics	1988
The Dirty Pair II: Dangerous Acquaintances	Artist and writer	Eclipse Comics	1989
The Dirty Pair III: A Plague of Angels	Artist and writer	Eclipse Comics	1990
The Terminator: Hunters and Killers	Writer	Dark Horse Comics	1992
The Dirty Pair: Sim Hell	Artist and writer	Dark Horse Comics	1993
Bubblegum Crisis: Grand Mal	Artist and writer	Dark Horse Comics	1994
The Dirty Pair: Fatal But Not Serious	Artist and writer	Dark Horse Comics	1995
Gen^{13}: Bootleg (#8–10, "Grunge: The Movie" story)	Artist and writer	WildStorm	1996
Titans: Scissors, Paper, Stone	Artist and writer	DC Comics	1997
C.H.I.X. (one-shot) (Sistah Ninja story)	Artist and writer	Image Comics	1998
Gen^{13}: Magical Drama Queen Roxy	Artist and writer	WildStorm	1998
The Dirty Pair: Start the Violence	Artist and writer	Dark Horse Comics	1999
Gen^{13} (Vol. 2 #60–77)	Artist and writer	WildStorm	1999
The Dirty Pair: Run from the Future	Artist and writer	Dark Horse Comics	2000
Marvel Mangaverse: Fantastic Four	Writer	Marvel Comics	2002
Livewires	Writer and storyboards	Marvel Comics	2005
Popbot Reader, for Popbot	Writer	IDW Publishing	2005
Iron Man: Hypervelocity	Writer and storyboards	Marvel Comics	2007
Empowered Vol. 1	Artist and writer	Dark Horse Comics	2007
Empowered Vol. 2	Artist and writer	Dark Horse Comics	2007
Empowered Vol. 3	Artist and writer	Dark Horse Comics	2008
Empowered Vol. 4	Artist and writer	Dark Horse Comics	2008
Empowered Vol. 5	Artist and writer	Dark Horse Comics	2009
Hulk: Broken Worlds #2	Writer	Marvel Comics	2009
Empowered Vol. 6	Artist and writer	Dark Horse Comics	2010
Galacta: Daughter of Galactus (one-shot)	Writer	Marvel Comics	2010
Empowered Vol. 7	Artist and writer	Dark Horse Comics	2012
Empowered Vol. 8	Artist and writer	Dark Horse Comics	2013
Empowered Vol. 9	Artist and writer	Dark Horse Comics	2015
Empowered Vol. 10	Artist and writer	Dark Horse Comics	2017
Empowered Vol. 11	Artist and writer	Dark Horse Comics	2019
Venom: The End	Artist and writer	Marvel Comics	2020
Empowered Vol. 12	Artist and writer	Dark Horse Comics	2024

=== Minor works ===
Title	Role	Publisher	Year
San Diego Comic-Con Comics, #3	Artist and writer	Dark Horse Comics	1994
Adam Warren Sketchbook (dōjinshi)	Artist	The Bio-Hazard Project	1996
The Adventures of the X-Men #5	Cover artist	Marvel Comics	August 1996
Barb Wire (character)	Cover artist	Dark Horse Comics	1996
Kabuki: Images	Pin-up artist	Image Comics	1998
Star Wars: A New Hope Manga	Cover artist	Dark Horse Comics	1998
Battle Chasers, #6 & #9	Cover artist (#6 only)/back up story (#6 & #9)	WildStorm	1998
Star Wars: The Empire Strikes Back Manga	Cover artist	Dark Horse Comics	1999
Star Wars: Return of the Jedi Manga	Cover artist	Dark Horse Comics	1999
Mangaphile, #1	Cover artist	Radio Comix	1999
Cannon God Exaxxion	Translator	Dark Horse Comics	2001–2006
A Big 'Merci Beaucoup' (one-shot)	Artist and writer	Dark Horse Comics	2001
Fantastic Four v3 57–59 (The Ever-Lovin', Blue-Eyed End of the World)	Writer	Marvel Comics	2002
The Art of Comic-Book Inking Vol. 2	Artist and writer	Dark Horse Comics	2002
How to Draw Manga Supersized Vol. 1	Contributor	Antarctic Press	2003
X-Men Unlimited Vol. 1, No. 47 ("Bloody 'Ell Story")	Artist and writer	Marvel Comics	2003
Street Fighter, No. 2, back up Chun-Li/Cammy story (Reprinted in Street Fighter Reloaded, (Udon, 2017))	Artist and writer	Image Comics	2003
Finder Vol. 6: Mystery Date	Pin-up artist	Lightspeed Press	2004
Seraphic Feather Vol. #1–#6	Translator	Dark Horse Comics	2001–2006
PSM	End page comic	PlayStation Magazine	????–2007
Marvel Assistant-Sized Spectacular (Galacta story)	Writer	Marvel Comics	2009
Empowered Special: The Wench With a Million Sighs	Artist and writer	Dark Horse Comics	2009
Iron Man: Titanium #1	Writer	Marvel Comics	2010
The Guild: Tink (one-shot)	Artist	Dark Horse Comics	2011
Empowered Special #2: Ten Questions for the Maidman	Artist and writer	Dark Horse Comics	2011
Empowered Special #3: Hell Bent or Heaven Sent	Artist and writer	Dark Horse Comics	2012
Empowered Special #4: Animal Style	Artist and writer	Dark Horse Comics	2013
Empowered Special #5: Nine Beers with Ninjette	Artist and writer	Dark Horse Comics	2013
Empowered and the Soldier of Love	Artist and writer	Dark Horse Comics	2018
