= AnimeCon =

Former anime convention in San Jose, California

- Status: Defunct
- Genre: Anime, Manga
- Venue: Red Lion Hotel
- Location: San Jose, California
- Coordinates: 37°22′18.5″N 121°55′23.6″W
- Country: United States
- Inaugurated: August 30, 1991; 35 years ago
- Attendance: 2,000 total (est.)
- Organizer: AnimeCon Corporation

AnimeCon was a four-day anime convention held during August/September at the Red Lion Hotel in San Jose, California. It was the first anime convention in the United States to have significant industry guests. The convention was sponsored by BAAS, BayCon's founders, Cal-Animage, Gainax, and Studio Proteus.

== Programming ==
The convention offered an art auction, art show, charity auction, dealer's room, a film room, guest of honor banquet, masquerade, Q&A sessions, and two video rooms. The viewing rooms ran 24 hours a day. The convention raised $4,500 for Ann Schubert's medical costs.

== History ==
The convention took two years to plan and was organized by Toshio Okada, Toren Smith, and John McLaughlin. Gainax provided significant guest support for the convention, with many staffers from Baycon staffing the event. Due to many of the US staff being college students, they made use of digital communication tools like email, BBS systems, and Usenet. Leiji Matsumoto was scheduled to be a guest but was unable to attend. At times, autograph lines were several hours long. The dealer's room was noted for being incredibly successful sales wise. Yasuhiro Takeda of Gainax considered AnimeCon a success, but commented it had staffing problems on the Japanese side.

The convention in 1992 was to be held over the weekend of July 4th, but would not return due to its high costs of operation, with staff starting Anime Expo and Anime America. Anime Expo considers AnimeCon its first year. AnimeCon Corporation was formally dissolved in February 1993.

=== Event history ===
Dates	Location	Atten.	Guests
August 30 - September 2, 1991	Red Lion Hotel; San Jose, California	2,000 total (est.)	Jerry Beck, Colleen Doran, Geoff Everets, Carl Macek, Ken Macklin, Johji Manabe, Luke Menichelli, Haruhiko Mikimoto, Robert Napton, John O'Donnell, Toshio Okada, David Keith Riddick, Yoshiyuki Sadamoto, Toren Smith, Kenichi Sonoda, Rick Sternbach, Jeff Thompson, Adam Warren, Robert Woodhead, and Toshifumi Yoshida.
