= Anime Punch! =

- Status: Defunct
- Venue: Sheraton Columbus Hotel at Capitol Square
- Location: Columbus, Ohio
- Country: United States
- Inaugurated: 2005; 21 years ago
- Most recent: 2017; 9 years ago
- Attendance: 1,600 in 2011

Anime Punch (stylized as Anime Punch!) was a Columbus, Ohio-based organization that hosts a number of events for fans of Japanese animation in the Central Ohio area. It originally began hosting an annual anime convention called Anime Punch, and subsequently branched out into hosting weekly social events, monthly lectures, and other regular events, in addition to three annual anime conventions. The convention ceased operations in September 2017, due to its con chair becoming a registered sex offender.

== Armageddicon ==
The main event of Anime Punch, Armageddicon focused exclusively on anime, eschewing the recent trend of conventions to attempt to cover anything and everything remotely related to Japan. Notably, Armageddicon also features a high density of educational, cultural and scholarly panels and workshops. During the 2008 convention, Anime Punch Armageddicon became the first anime convention to adopt radio-frequency identification (RFID) in order to collect data about dealers' room entrances and panel attendance.

=== Event history ===
Dates	Location	Atten.	Guests
April 30, 2005	Ohio State University; Columbus, Ohio	200	
March 31 – April 2, 2006	Holiday Inn Worthington; Columbus, Ohio	1,030	Steve Conte, Maureen Donavan, Lawrence Eng, Crispin Freeman, Kuwai-sensei, Lillian Olsen, CarrieLynn Reinhard, Joshua Seth, Lien Fan Shen, The Spoony Bards, and Richard Torrance.
March 30 – April 1, 2007	Columbus Airport Marriott; Columbus, Ohio	1,400	Maureen Donavan, Lawrence Eng, Crispin Freeman, Mikhail Koulikov, Tristan MacAvery, Lillian Olsen, The Protomen, CarrieLynn Reinhard, Patrick Seitz, The Spoony Bards, Richard Torrance, Harlan Watkins, and Mariah Watkins.
April 11–13, 2008	Crowne Plaza Columbus North; Columbus, Ohio	1,337	Maureen Donavan, Lawrence Eng, Hsu-Nami, Mikhail Koulikov, Dr. John A. Lent, Tristan MacAvery, Lillian Olsen, CarrieLynn Reinhard, Patrick Seitz, The Spoony Bards, Harlan Watkins, and Mariah Watkins.
April 10–12, 2009	Doubletree Hotel Columbus/Worthington; Columbus, Ohio	1,109	Haruko Nogawa, The Protomen, Patrick Seitz, Mikhail Koulikov, Lawrence Eng, and The Spoony Bards
April 2–4, 2010	Hyatt Regency; Columbus, Ohio	1,400	Richard Torrance, Lawrence Eng, Stacey Schlanger, Kinko Ito, Lee Makela, Brad Swaile, Patrick Seitz, The Spoony Bards, Kosuke Saito
April 22–24, 2011	Hyatt Regency; Columbus, Ohio	1,603	The Protomen, Lawrence Eng, Brad Swaile, Toren Smith, Jared Hedges, Joel Burgen, Alex Muniz
December 21–23, 2012	Sheraton Columbus Hotel at Capitol Square; Columbus, Ohio	831	The Protomen, Lawrence Eng, Brad Swaile, J. Michael Tatum, Taliesin Jaffe, Lance Heiskell
March 28–30, 2014	Holiday Inn Worthington; Columbus, Ohio		2d6, Leah Clark, COO-Interactive Entertainment, Patrick Drazen, Chuck Huber, The Pillowcases
April 3–5, 2015	Crowne Plaza Columbus North; Columbus, Ohio		2d6, The Skashank Redemption, COO-Interactive Entertainment, Joel McDonald, Tony Oliver
March 25–27, 2016	Holiday Inn Columbus N - I-270 Worthington; Columbus, Ohio		

== Revoluticon ==
Revoluticon was introduced for a debut in 2012 as a new line of events hosted by Anime Punch. Whereas Armageddicon is entirely focused on anime with limited to no non-anime content, Revoluticon was billed as the anti-armageddicon. It is still aimed at anime fans, but only their tangential interests, with zero anime content. Covered subject matter includes video games, fantasy, science fiction, western animation, comic books, traditional Japanese culture, Japanese modern/pop culture, and cosplay.

=== Event History ===
Dates	Location	Atten.	Guests
March 16–18, 2012	Ramada Plaza Columbus; Columbus, Ohio	451	Lawrence Eng, Patrick Drazen, +2 Comedy, 2d6, Custodians of Otakudom, OSU Quiddich, Analytical Couch Potato, The Fishnet Mafia

== Fieldcon ==
Fieldcon is another line of conventions that since 2006 has been hosted by Anime Punch. It takes place entirely outdoors without access to electricity, running water, or the internet. Its remote location in the AEP ReCreation Lands near The Wilds takes it far from most people, and even cellphone reception. Attendance is small, and events are informal.

=== Event history ===
Dates	Location	Atten.
July 28–30, 2006	AEP ReCreation Lands; Morgan County, Ohio	18
June 29 – July 1, 2007	AEP ReCreation Lands; Morgan County, Ohio	41
July 25–27, 2008	AEP ReCreation Lands; Morgan County, Ohio	
June 26–28, 2009	AEP ReCreation Lands; Morgan County, Ohio	60
July 25–27, 2010	AEP ReCreation Lands; Morgan County, Ohio	50
July 1–3, 2011	AEP ReCreation Lands; Morgan County, Ohio	
July 6–8, 2012	AEP ReCreation Lands; Morgan County, Ohio	
June 21–23, 2013	AEP ReCreation Lands; Morgan County, Ohio	
June 20–22, 2014	AEP ReCreation Lands; Morgan County, Ohio	
July 10–12, 2015	AEP ReCreation Lands; Morgan County, Ohio	
August 12–14, 2016	AEP ReCreation Lands; Morgan County, Ohio	
June 30 - July 2, 2017	AEP ReCreation Lands; Morgan County, Ohio	
