= Outlanders (manga) =

Japanese manga series by Johji Manabe

- Cover of Outlanders bunkobon volume 1 featuring Princess Kahm

アウトランダーズ (Autorandāzu)
- Genre: Science fantasy; Space opera
- Manga
- Written by: Johji Manabe
- Published by: Hakusensha
- English publisher: NA: Dark Horse Comics
- Imprint: Jets Comics
- Magazine: Monthly ComiComi
- Original run: January 1985 – November 1987
- Volumes: 8
- Original video animation
- Directed by: Katsuhisa Yamada
- Produced by: Hiroshi Iwata; Tomoko Satō
- Written by: Kenji Terada; Sukehiro Tomita
- Music by: Kei Wakakusa
- Studio: Tatsunoko Production
- Licensed by: NA: Discotek Media
- Released: December 16, 1986
- Runtime: 48 minutes
- Video game
- Developer: Victor Musical Industries
- Publisher: Victor Musical Industries
- Genre: Action role-playing game
- Platform: Famicom
- Released: December 4, 1987
- Video game
- Developer: Cross Media Soft
- Publisher: Victor Musical Industries
- Genre: Action role-playing game
- Platform: NEC PC-8801
- Released: April 1988

Outlanders (アウトランダーズ, Autorandāzu) is a Japanese manga series written and illustrated by Johji Manabe. The story follows the alien Kahm, crown princess of the interstellar Santovasku Empire, who invades Earth and meets and falls in love with human news photographer Tetsuya Wakatsuki. The couple and their allies soon find themselves caught in a war between Earth's military, the Santovasku invasion forces, and an ancient clan seeking vengeance on the Santovasku. Outlanders is largely a space opera series that combines aspects of science fantasy, romance, comedy, and fan service.

Outlanders was created out of Manabe's desire to try his hand the space opera genre. He was driven by his penchant for illustrating attractive, sword-wielding girls and large, detailed spacecraft, as well as his interest in science fiction epics such as the original Star Wars Trilogy. Outlanders was Manabe's first serialized work and was featured in the Hakusensha manga magazine Monthly ComiComi between January 1985 and November 1987.

Individual chapters of Outlanders were collected and sold as eight tankōbon volumes in Japan during its publication in Monthly ComiComi. The series spawned an anime adaptation in the form of an original video animation (OVA) by Tatsunoko Production, released in Japan in December 1986. The manga was translated into English by Toren Smith of Studio Proteus and licensed in North America by Dark Horse Comics beginning in 1988 as one of its earliest manga properties. The OVA received two English dubs: the first from U.S. Renditions in 1993 and the second from Central Park Media (CPM) in 2006. Critical reaction to the anime has been largely mixed regarding its tone, animation, and sound design, though many agreed that the adaptation condenses too much of the manga's plot.

== Plot ==
Outlanders begins in modern-day Tokyo with the arrival of a Biomech, a giant, organic starship that easily destroys several Japanese Self-Defense Force (JSDF) helicopters. News photographer Tetsuya Wakatsuki comes face-to-face with the craft's occupant Kahm, crown princess of the technologically advanced, interstellar Santovasku Empire. She charges him, he manages to fend her off, and she retreats without her sword. Kahm's father, Emperor Quevas, is informed that the Santovaskuan "sacred planet" is infested with humans while the JSDF supreme commander Togo prepares for an impending war with the alien invaders. Battia Bureitin Rou, a Santovasku fleet commander and Kahm's best friend, is sent to retrieve the princess when she returns to the city in search of her sword. During a skirmish with the humans, Battia's ship takes heavy damage, which triggers the Biomech's self-destruct mechanism. Having found her sword and Tetsuya in his apartment, Kahm receives a warning from Battia and evacuates with Tetsuya as the entire Japanese archipelago is vaporized. Meanwhile, Tetsuya's boss, Aki Okazawa, is taken to Siberia by the JSDF. There she meets Neo, Togo's superior and the leader of the secret world political organization known as the Shadow Cabinet. He exposits that millions of years earlier Earth was the seat of the Ra Empire, torn apart in a civil war between two belligerents: the Yoma Clan and the progenitors of the current Santovasku Empire. Neo, himself a surviving Yoma from this conflict, tells Aki that her body houses the spirit of the Yoma witch Jilehr Maruda and that he wishes to utilize her immense power to exact revenge on the Santovasku. Shortly thereafter, Quevas gives the order for all human life to be exterminated, resulting in large portions Europe being bombarded by the empire. Neo awakens Jilehr within Aki and the assaulting platoon is instantly obliterated by her magic.

Tetsuya hears of Japan's fate and forces Kahm to return him to Earth. The two crash land in Germany and meet scavenger Raisa Vogel. They evade capture by German troops and Raisa splits off on her own. Kahm and Tetsuya discuss marrying to create a diplomatic alliance between the humans and Santovasku. The couple rendezvous with Kahm's Nuba Tribe servants, use her crashed ship's communicator to call for extraction, and set a course for the Santovasku imperial home world. Battia joins them. Kahm tells her she is denouncing her father's intention of arranging her marriage to produce a royal heir and is strategically marrying Tetsuya to stop the war. Once arriving and making their case, an unconvinced Quevas has Tetsuya arrested and sentences him to death then puts Kahm under house arrest. With the aid of Battia and the Nuba, they manage to escape and head for Earth again in hopes of gaining support from its military to fight the empire instead. Realizing their affection for one another has grown, Kahm and Tetsuya still intend to wed. Upon reaching Earth's orbit, Kahm pleads with empire affiliate Geobaldi to join their efforts, which he does following a duel with Tetsuya. Neo continues to groom Jilehr in exacting vengeance on the Santovasku. Togo, now the head of Earth's global armed forces, plots against the Yoma so that humanity alone may ultimately triumph so that he can achieve his own ambitions of galactic conquest.

The rebels land on Earth, reunite with Raisa, and have brief diplomatic talks with Togo before leaving. Togo then has Neo gunned down and initiates Operation Phoenix. This unveils the Earth's moon as an enormous weapon called Dola, which was built by the Ra Empire eons ago. Raisa and Aki both join the rebels and take part in Kahm and Tetsuya's wedding. The festivities are cut short when an imperial army group is sent to their location by Quevas to demolish Earth for Kahm's continued defiance. A large battle between the Santovasku and rebel squadron ensues. Aki becomes Jilehr once more and takes control of the rebel vessels while Togo gives the command to have Dola strike the battlefield frontlines. A substantial percentage of the Santovasku fleet is vanquished, but as Togo's team celebrates they receive a taunting call from Jilehr. Realizing the sorceress survived the initial blast, Togo desperately demands another to eliminate her. However, the humans lose control of the ancient weapon to Jilehr as she sets it on a collision course with Earth. After madly proclaiming his aspirations to rule the galaxy, the selfish Togo is assassinated by one of his officers just as Dola and planet impact, wiping out humanity.

The protagonists find that they have warped to the outskirts of the Santovasku imperial planet. Jilehr shows herself again, this time surrounded by the vengeful ghosts of the Yoma Clan. Jilehr causes the rebel Biomechs to fire on the planet, prompting Quevas to engage with her in a fierce battle of magic. Before the Yoma spirits succumb to the emperor's overwhelming abilities, Aki breaks free of Jilehr's hold and dies. Quevas subsequently appears aboard Kahm's spacecraft. He reveals his initial plan to reclaim Earth was to ensure the Yoma's eradication. He then teleports with his daughter to the planet's imperial palace. With Jilehr gone, the rebels regain control of their warships and breach the planet's defenses to rescue Kahm once more. Battia, Geobaldi, and Raisa all sacrifice their lives so that Tetsuya can reach the palace. Tetsuya proceeds to the royal throne room and is confronted by a hostile Kahm. With no memory of her husband due to the influence of her father's mind control, she attacks Tetsuya only to come to her senses moments later. A final confrontation between Quevas and Kahm ends with the princess fatally wounding the emperor with a sword stab. His death brings with it the destruction of the imperial planet and the Santovasku Empire. Kahm and Tetsuya manage to depart with the Nuba just as the planet explodes. Three years later, they have happily settled on the peaceful planet Ekoda. Now with quintuplet daughters and one son, Kahm and Tetsuya receive a visit from the souls of their deceased friends during an annual festival.

== Characters ==
=== Protagonists ===
Tetsuya Wakatsuki (若槻哲也, Wakatsuki Tetsuya)
The human main protagonist, and a young photographer for the newspaper agency Toa News. Originally self-conscious and timid, he grows in courage and willpower during the war, mainly when he falls in love with Kahm, and takes up the fight against the Santovasku Empire.

Princess Kahm (カーム, Kāmu)
The story's alien main protagonist, and the impulsive crown princess of the Santovasku Empire. She originally came to Earth to escape her confined life in the imperial palace and find adventure and excitement in battle. After first attempting to kill Tetsuya, she falls in love with him, compelling her into helping him defend the Earth against her father's predations.

Battia Bureitin Rou (バティア・ブレイティン・ロウ, Batia Bureitin Rō)
A catgirl officer in the Santovasku Empire, Kahm's minder and best friend, and Geobaldi's lover. She is a swordswoman of extraordinary skill. She dies during Tetsuya's assault on the Imperial palace to rescue Kahm from her father, although her spirit returns in the manga's epilogue as part of a special holiday (on which the living are allowed to spend one day each year with dear departed friends and family) on the planet on which Tetsuya and Kahm have settled.

Geobaldi (ゲオバルディ, Geobarudi)
An immensely strong soldier and a member of the Gadom, a primitive bear-man people which were all but eradicated by the Santovasku Empire. The few survivors were drafted as battle fodder into the imperial forces; Geobaldi has risen to the rank of commander over their forces. After testing Tetsuya's courage in a duel, he becomes impressed enough with him to turn against the empire. He is killed during the final attack on the imperial palace, but returns as a spirit in the story's epilogue.

Aki Okazawa (岡沢亜紀, Okazawa Aki) / Jilehr Maruda (マルダーギレ, Marudā Gire)
A reporter for Toa News, and Tetsuya's boss. A very temperamental, stubborn personality, she is used by Neo as a vessel to resurrect the dead Santovaskuan witch Jilehr Maruda, who was reincarnated in her, as his weapon of vengeance against the empire. Despite her bossy nature, she deeply cares for Tetsuya, and it is this affection which allows her to rid herself of Jilehr's spirit, although the strain kills her. Like Battia and Geobaldi, she appears again as a spirit in the manga's epilogue chapter.

Raisa Vogel (ライザ・フォーゲル, Raiza Fōgeru)
A young German girl who lost her family during the first wave of the Santovasku invasion, she encounters Tetsuya and Kahm when the alien princess first returns him to Earth. Because she falls in love with Tetsuya, and due to her hatred for the alien invaders, she and Kahm initially become rivals, but Raisa eventually ends up aiding them in their struggle against the empire. She is killed during the final mission to rescue Kahm from her father, but returns as a spirit in the manga's epilogue.

Nao (ナオ, Nao)
The head of Kahm's faithful servants, the Nuba Tribe, a clan of dwarfish reptilian humanoids.

Momo (メメ, Momo)
Nao's wife.

Megane (メーガネ, Mēgane)
A bespectacled member of Nao's servant clan who falls in unrequited love with Raisa.

=== Antagonists ===
Emperor Quevas (クェイヴァス皇帝, Ku~eivu~asu kōtei)
The supreme ruler of the Santovasku Empire. He is Kahm's caring but overbearing father, and ruthless to the extreme, he even resorts to mind control to get her back to his side. He initiates the invasion of Earth solely to eradicate Neo, the last survivor of the Yoma Clan who poses a threat to his life. When Tetsuya invades the imperial palace to rescue Kahm, and she sees him injured, she shakes off the mind control and mortally wounds her father, thereby triggering the utter destruction of the empire.

Togo (東郷, Togo)
The supreme commander of the Japanese Self-Defense Force. On the surface the leader of Earth's defenses against the aliens, he is actually a member of the Shadow Cabinet, a small group of Earth people who are aware of Neo's origins and are working hand in hand with his goals to destroy the empire. Secretly, however, he schemes to take control of Earth for himself, manipulating Giru and even Jilehr to this end; but Jilehr, unwilling to be dominated, eventually turns against him. Just before Jilehr wipes out the rest of humanity by causing the Moon to crash into the Earth, Togo is killed by one of his underlings when his megalomania turns into desperate ruthlessness.

Neo (ネオ, Neo)
An ancient sorcerer of the alien Yoma Clan who has kept himself alive for centuries with the use of life-sustaining machines. Intent on a vendetta against the Santovasku Empire for banishing his clan, he has allied himself with the authorities on Earth, and upon the beginning of the Santovasku invasion he resurrects Jilehr in Aki's body as his weapon of vengeance. He is eventually betrayed by his familiar Giru and murdered by his human ally Togo.

Masato Hagiwara (萩原, Hagiwara Masato) / Giru (ギル, Giru)
A JSDF captain and Aki's ex-boyfriend, he is actually Neo's familiar, a raven bestowed with sentience and speech capability who was temporarily shapechanged into a human form. Still in love with Aki, and therefore a reluctant helper in Neo's scheme, he eventually betrays him to Togo and is subsequently murdered by the general once he has served his purpose.

Gelvas (ゲルバス, Gerubasu)
The head bishop of the Santovasku Empire. While loyal to the emperor, he is a much more level-headed man and sympathetic towards Kahm and Tetsuya's relationship. He remains behind and is killed when the imperial homeworld self-destructs upon the emperor's death.

Progresso (プログレス, Puroguresu)
A first officer and admiral of the Santovasku Empire. He is given the task of exterminating humanity after Battia is relieved of her command by the emperor. He dies during an assault on Europe when Jilehr uses her magic to destroy his fleet of motherships.

=== OVA voice cast ===
| Character | Actor | | |
| Character | Japanese | English | |
| Character | Japanese | U.S. Renditions | Central Park Media |
|---|---|---|---|
| Tetsuya Wakatsuki | Mitsuo Iwata | Tom Fahn | Sean Schemmel |
| Princess Kahm | Fumi Hirano | Trish Ledoux | Liza Kaplan |
| Battia Braytin Law | Mari Yokoo | Dorothy Elias-Fahn | Rebecca Soler |
| Emperor Quevas XIII | Takashi Toyama | Doug Stone | Dan Green |
| Geobaldi | Kenji Utsumi | Kevin Seymour | Sean Schemmel |
| Momo | Mika Doi | Dorothy Elias-Fahn | Erica Schroeder |
| Nao | Akira Kamiya | Gary Dubin | Oliver Wyman |
| Progresso | Miko Terashima | Steve Bulen | Oliver Wyman |

== Production ==
Outlanders was written and illustrated by Johji Manabe. As early as junior high school, he was creating fantasy and science fiction art including beautiful girls with swords and large, highly detailed spaceships. Outlanders began as a project while he was in vocational school. During his attendance, Manabe submitted some of his manga work to Tokyo-based publisher Hakusensha. One of his stories was featured its Monthly ComiComi magazine's readers contest in 1984 and Outlanders began serialization in the same publication within a year. Outlanders debuted in the January 1985 issue.

Manabe felt he had been given ample time to conceptualize and frame the narrative. Outlanders was his first attempt at space opera, a genre of which he had long been a fan. The author took inspiration from numerous science fiction properties, specifically the original Star Wars Trilogy, the Lensman series, and Flash Gordon. His editors requested "an action story full of monsters, mayhem, and destruction." This is partly reflected in the manga's earlier chapters, which showcase considerable more violence than its remainder. However, because Manabe was not very fond of monsters, he compromised by creating the living, Biomech warships. He did not initially plan for the crafts to be biological organisms. For instance, one imperial battleship began as an altered Macross spacecraft before several redesigns gave it an increasingly organic appearance. Manabe simplified writing the plot as a war between Earth and the Santovasku Empire that would end with one winner and one loser, but did have some difficulty with getting the conflicts within each faction to "mesh." Regarding the characters, Manabe found it challenging to develop each one's complex personality, so he "pretty much let them do their own thing" and "decided they could play their own roles as they pleased." Kahm was the first character Manabe proposed for the editors, basing her art design on a sketch from his design school days. As he lacked experience in clothing design prior to Outlanders, he remarked that "getting the characters and the Santovasku Army suited up was a real nightmare."

At some point during the serialization of Outlanders, Manabe moved to Tokyo, opened his own manga studio, and hired full-time assistants to focus more on its production. Throughout its run, he wrote several related stories set in the Outlanders universe. A prequel chapter titled The Key of Graciale (グラシェールの鍵, Gurashēru no Kagi) was featured in the January 1986 issue of Monthly ComiComi. Outlanders was adapted into an anime OVA by Tatsunoko Production for a December 1986 release. It was directed by Katsuhisa Yamada; was written by Kenji Terada and Sukehiro Tomita; and featured music composed by Kei Wakakusa. The anime condenses roughly the first half of the manga into a single 48-minute episode. Manabe detested the OVA, considered its staff incompetent, and felt the sexually explicit ecchi scenes were overused. Manabe originally planned Outlanders to be about ten tankōbon volumes of collected chapters in length. He lost his motivation before this could occur, partially blaming the anime adaptation and claiming his relationship with the publisher deteriorated after the OVA's release. Outlanders ended its serialization in the November 1987 issue of Monthly ComiComi. Hakusensha's release of the manga's eighth volume would be its last. An agreement was reached to release an aizōban edition of the manga shortly thereafter and tensions between Manabe and Hakusensha eventually cooled.

=== Localization ===
The Outlanders manga was licensed in the United States and Canada by Dark Horse Comics as one of the company's earliest manga releases. Dark Horse was unable to acquire the rights to Akira, so they settled on Outlanders as a second choice. Translator Toren Smith pitched the license to the publisher at the 1988 San Diego Comic-Con. Smith had helped pioneer the sale of manga outside of Japan by convincing retailers to carry it in monthly issues that could be read in the left-to-right format to which many English readers were accustomed. Dark Horse partnered with Smith's Studio Proteus beginning that same year to translate Outlanders into English and publish it in its entirety. Unlike translators such as Viz Media, Studio Proteus was an independent contractor who negotiated and obtained the rights to manga for multiple publishers, effectively making Smith's group a "co-publisher" of Outlanders. Smith told Amazing Heroes in 1990 that Outlanders was his favorite manga to work on and read. Dark Horse writer and artist Chris Warner performed part-time editorial work on the English version of the series beginning with its first chapter. Manabe himself became involved with the localization by redrawing some of the earlier panels to make them more in line with the rest of the story. With the release of the overseas version of the manga, Manabe lamented on some of its production by stating, "Someday, if I have the chance, I'd like to write Outlanders II and get it right. Or perhaps write a follow-up, a history of the post-war years." In 1996, Manabe penned a short chapter titled "The Kahm Family at Home" that depicts a photo album of Kahm, Tetsuya, and their children in the years after the series conclusion. This story appeared in the third issue of the A Decade of Dark Horse anthology miniseries.

The OVA was licensed for North American distribution by Dark Image Entertainment (a division of U.S. Renditions) and dubbed into English by L.A. Hero Inc. (Animaze) in 1993. The dub was directed by Kevin Seymour (as Jenny Haniver) and translated by Trish Ledoux, the latter of whom also voiced the protagonist Kahm. This was Ledoux's first major voice acting role after only having performed a minor part in the film Macross II. CPM later purchased the rights to the anime with a DVD release set for the summer of 2005. However, it was delayed when the company decided to redub the OVA. A fan poll was conducted between September 23 and 28 of that year to cast the voice actors of the four principle protagonists. The poll ended at over 20,000 votes with fans selecting Liza Jacqueline to play Kahm, Rebecca Soler to play Battia, and Sean Schemmel to play both Tetsuya and Geobaldi.

== Media ==
=== Manga ===
Outlanders was serialized in the Japanese magazine Monthly ComiComi by publisher Hakusensha between its January 1985 to November 1987 issues. The individual serialized chapters, alongside related manga stories by Manabe, were collected into a total of eight tankōbon books and released from June 1985 to November 1987. An aizōban (deluxe) edition consisting of two volumes was released between July and August 1989. Finally, a bunkoban (novel sized) version consisting of four volumes was released between December 2000 and March 2001. The prequel story The Key of Graciale was published by Hakusensha as its own eponymous tankōbon in April 1987 alongside other one-shot works by Manabe. On November 12, 2018, Goma Books began distributing the original eight Outlanders manga volumes for sale digitally on Japanese electronic bookstores including the Kindle Store, Apple Books, and Google Play Books.

In North America, Dark Horse Comics released 33 individual chapters as comic book issues each month from December 1988 to September 1991. Three additional issues were subsequently published: the aforementioned The Key of Graciale story as "Issue #0" in March 1992; a "special" issue containing a prequel story titled Battia's Bane in March 1993; and an "epilogue" chapter in March 1994. Chapters were also compiled into eight paperback graphic novels and released between December 1989 and February 2000. Outlanders was the first Dark Horse manga printed in graphic novel form. Throughout the 1990s Outlanders was licensed for release in European countries including Dark Horse Comics in France, Planeta DeAgostini in Spain, and Granata Press in Italy.

==== Volumes ====
| No. | Original release date | Original ISBN | English release date | English ISBN |
|---|---|---|---|---|
| 1 | June 1985 | 4-59213-053-7 | December 1, 1989 | 1-56971-161-5 |
| 2 | September 1985 | 4-59213-053-7 | October 1, 1990 | 1-56971-162-3 |
| 3 | January 1986 | 4-59213-073-1 | April 1, 1994 | 1-56971-163-1 |
| 4 | May 1986 | 4-59213-086-3 | March 1, 1995 | 1-56971-069-4 |
| 5 | November 1986 | 4-59213-525-3 | January 28, 1998 | 1-56971-275-1 |
| 6 | May 1987 | 4-59213-525-3 | July 14, 1999 | 1-56971-423-1 |
| 7 | October 1987 | 4-59213-527-X | September 23, 1999 | 1-56971-424-X |
| 8 | November 1987 | 4-59213-528-8 | February 9, 2000 | 1-56971-425-8 |

=== OVA ===
The Outlanders anime OVA adaptation from Tatsunoko Production was released in Japan on VHS, Betamax, and LaserDisc on December 16, 1986. The English OVA from Dark Image Entertainment was released on VHS in North America on September 1, 1993. CPM released a 20th anniversary edition DVD of the second English dub under its US Manga Corps label on February 7, 2006.

On August 1, 2026, Discotek Media announced at Otakon they had licensed the OVA for a North American Blu-ray and is set for release on October 27, 2026.

=== Music ===
The soundtrack for the anime OVA was released by Victor Musical Industries on CD, cassette, and vinyl on November 21, 1986. It featured 19 tracks including two vocal songs: "Sutekina Koto ni Shimasen ka" (ステキなことにしませんか, Something Wonderful) performed by N&M and "Hoshi no Hitomi" (星の瞳, Starry Eyes) performed by NA'MON. Victor released the two songs as a vinyl single that same year.

=== Video game ===
An Outlanders video game was developed by Micronics and published by Victor for the Nintendo Famicom in Japan on December 4, 1987. It is an action role-playing game in which the player takes control of the protagonist Tetsuya on a mission to rescue Princess Kahm. It has received poor review scores. A version for the NEC PC-8801 was developed by Cross Media Soft and was released by Victor in April 1988.

=== Other merchandise ===
A guidebook to the OVA titled Outlanders Film Book (アウトランダーズ・フィルムブック) was published by Movic on February 28, 1987. A strategy guide for the video game was published by Tokuma Shoten on December 30, 1987. A book titled Johji Manabe Illustration Collection (真鍋譲治イラスト集 至悦至極) containing artwork from Outlanders was released by Gakken on December 12, 1996. Manabe and his studio have additionally created various hentai of his own work and erotic doujinshi of other anime and manga under the label Ura Outlanders (裏アウトランダーズ). Calendars, posters, garage kits, and additional Outlanders merchandise has been sold.

== Reception ==
Although sales and print circulation numbers have not been made widely available, Outlanders enjoyed commercial success in Japan to a degree that author Johji Manabe was able to open his own studio and employ assistants during its publication. In 1992, Dark Horse manga editor John Weeks described the English localization of Outlanders as "very successful". Jason Thompson critiqued the series in Manga: The Complete Guide as "a star-spanning epic adventure that gradually morphs into a drippy love story." He was impressed with the creative choices Manabe made with its action and science fiction elements early in the manga, but disliked how the series became increasingly more centered on the evolving romantic subplot between its two main protagonists.

The Outlanders VHS from Dark Image Entertainment was the third-best selling anime for the month of November 1993 according to Capital City Distribution. Critical reception for the Outlanders OVA has been mixed. Reviewers saw the plot as a standard yet light-hearted science fiction epic with large amounts of fan service and casual use of graphic violence, though views on its execution varied. The Anime Encyclopedia authors Jonathan Clements and Helen McCarthy found the story presented "considerable charm despite a fairly high violence quotient." Anime News Network contributor Theron Martin noted it as "quite a bit more sexy and violent than the norm" and "a fun romp which does not concern itself with weighty matters like originality, cohesiveness, or logic." Animefringe writer Joseph Luscik praised the anime's comedy and entertainment variety despite its short length and that "it cannot be considered a masterpiece of the genre." Samuel Arbogast of T.H.E.M. Anime Reviews was much more negative and noted, "There's not quite enough violence to appease carnage aficionados, there isn't any romance to appease the romantics, and there isn't anything beyond some rather pointless nudity to appease the perverts." Both Martin and Arbogast objected to the condensed nature of the OVA's narrative and its fast pacing, stating that knowledge of the manga would be a prerequisite to enjoying or understanding it. Martin summarized, "The lack of adequate explanation for several key story elements also suggests that it was made specifically for fans of the manga, as newcomers to the franchise will be left scratching their heads over certain events." Arbogast claimed the plot of Outlanders to be a plagiarism of the manga and anime series Urusei Yatsura, which also centers around the romance between a lecherous, human male and a scantifly-clad, alien female that starts when the latter's race attempts to invade Earth. Clements and McCarthy merely saw these similarities as "affectionate nods." Arbogast called the characters "badly lacking" and was particularly critical of its two leads, Tetsuya and Kahm, who fall in love but "have nothing in common other than that they're both young and stupid." Luscik saw the mutual attraction between the protagonists as refreshing when opposed to the one-sided affection found in some other anime.

Opinions on the technical aspects of the Outlanders OVA were also mixed. While Martin saw the art style and character designs as typical for its release mid-1980s era, he found fault with its animation. He stated that its slow frame rate made many of the movements "clunky" and outlined, "The action is staged well enough that the visual effect is passable as long as one doesn't dwell on the details, but this isn't a title that's going to win any technical awards." Arbogast complimented the background art as "nicely detailed", but viewed the animation as poor overall, particularly its fight sequences and scenes involving nudity, surmising that it would inexcusable had it been released only a few years later. The reviewer was equally unimpressed with the sound design including its background music, ending vocal theme, and the voice acting for the L.A. Hero English dub. Martin commented on the ending theme as a "guitar-heavy rock number typical of '80s musical trends" and its background musical score as sounding appropriately inspired by American science fiction media like Star Trek. Both Martin and Luscik praised the talent and delivery of the CPM dub performers and recognized that the licensor's allowance of fans to elect voice actors by vote would likely curb most criticism of their casting. However, Martin downgraded the dub portion of his review due to the newer script altering the meaning of certain lines of the Japanese dialogue and unnecessarily adding in others for comedic effect. Luscik contrarily appreciated these changes, stating, "There will be zero complaints here, since you spend most of the movie laughing at the witty script."
