= Ginga Sengoku Gun'yūden Rai =

Japanese manga series and its adaptations

- Thunder Jet: Raiders of the Galaxy Empire
- First volume cover of the digital re-release of the manga

銀河戦国群雄伝ライ (Ginga Sengoku Gun'yūden Rai)
- Genre: Science fiction, Space opera
- Manga
- Written by: George Manabe
- Published by: Kadokawa Shoten; MediaWorks
- Magazine: Comic Comp (1989–1992); Dengeki Comic Gao! (1992–2001)
- Original run: November 1989 – November 2001
- Volumes: 27
- Anime television series
- Directed by: Seiji Okuda
- Written by: Jinzō Toriumi
- Music by: Kaoru Wada
- Studio: E&G Films
- Original network: TV Tokyo
- Original run: April 8, 1994 – March 31, 1995
- Episodes: 52
- icon

Ginga Sengoku Gun'yūden Rai (銀河戦国群雄伝ライ; lit. 'Galaxy Warring State Chronicle Rai') is a Japanese manga series written and illustrated by George Manabe. It was first serialized in Kadokawa Shoten's Comic Comp Magazine beginning November 1989 up to January 1993. The series transferred publication to MediaWorks's Dengeki Comic Gao! magazine from February 1993 to November 2001. The series focuses on Rai Ryuga, a young courageous warrior who seeks to unify the cosmos in a war against other two powerful forces.

The series borrows heavily from events of the Sengoku period and events from the Chinese historical novel Romance of the Three Kingdoms.

An anime adaptation of the series aired on TV Tokyo from April 8, 1994, to March 31, 1995. It was known outside Japan as Thunder Jet: Raiders of the Galaxy Empire.

== Plot ==
After the collapse of the Sacred Galaxy Empire, a battle for control of the Milky Way Galaxy breaks out among the warlords. From the chaos emerges a young courageous warrior, Rai Ryuga. He is a fearless warrior to his foes but to others, he is a gentle soul, dependable and loyal. Two powerful forces aspire to reign over the entire empire: Hiki Danjo, ruler of the Northern Region of the Milky Way, and Lord Masamune, ruler of the Southern Region. Rai sees the ensuing battle and ponders the ultimate goal: to battle against other factions in order to reunify the Milky Way under one ruler and that one day he will bring peace to the galaxy.

== Characters ==
Rai Ryuga (竜我 雷, Ryūga Rai)
Voiced by: Shinichiro Ohta (Audio Drama), Nobuyuki Hiyama (Anime)
The protagonist and hero of the series. He joined the Army of the Kingdom of Gojo as a Private, but he was quickly promoted to platoon leader and, later, as battalion commander after successive victories in critical battles.
Unkai (紫紋)
Voiced by: Yuu Shimaka
A 34-year-old monk born in the same planet as Rai. He has tremendous physical strength while being very loyal to him.
Tasuke (麗羅)
Voiced by: Kappei Yamaguchi
A 14-year-old boy who tags along with Rai and Unkai. Often seen using a gun during battles.
Lan-Lan (蘭々, Ranran)
Voiced by: Sumie Baba
A little girl who serves as an attendant for Shimon, she is also a younger sister of Kagyoku. She loves and trusts her very much. In the end of the manga, she becomes Soukuka's wife.

== Media ==
=== Manga ===
The original manga is released in November 1989 up to January 1993 and was serialized in Kadokawa Shoten's Comic Comp magazine. The manga is compiled into 6 tankobon volumes on its first released. The series then moved to MediaWorks's Dengeki Comic Gao! and ran from February 1993 to November 2001, compiling the series up to 16 tankobon volumes. The entire manga series is later available in both Kadokawa's BookWalker app in Japan and in Amazon's Amazon Kindle app.

=== Anime ===
The anime adaptation of the manga was animated by E&G Films and aired on TV Tokyo in Japan from April 8, 1994, to March 31, 1995. Seiji Okuda directed the series with scripts written by Jinzō Toriumi. (Science Ninja Team Gatchaman, Yatterman) Norihiko Tanimoto performed the series' opening theme "Ikazuchi Densetsu" (雷伝説; lit. 'Thunder Legend') while Mari Sasaki sang the ending theme "Yume Kesshō" (夢化粧; lit. 'Make-Up Dream')

In 1993, one year before the anime aired on TV, the president of Kadokawa Shoten Haruki Kadokawa was arrested for instructing photographer Takeshi Ikeda, a close aide, to smuggle cocaine from the United States on several occasions. He was charged with smuggling and embezzling money from his company in order to fund the drug purchases. The arrest resulted in Kadokawa's anime productions to be produced under lower budget to studios such as E&G Films. Because of this incident, George Manabe has voiced a dislike for the anime adaptation. It also was aired in TPI (now MNCTV), Indonesia during 1995. As of 2021, the show has not been released in any format.

Episodes

No.	Title	Original release date
1	"A Flaming Star of Galaxy"; Transliteration: "Ginga no Fuuunji" (Japanese: 銀河の風雲児)	April 8, 1994
2	"A Warlord Called One-Eyed Dragon"; Transliteration: "Bibou no Dokugan Ryuu" (Japanese: 美貌の独眼竜)	April 15, 1994
3	"Thunder Jet Sallies Forth to the South Region!"; Transliteration: "Shutsugeki! 4077 Butai" (Japanese: 出撃! 4077部隊)	April 22, 1994
4	"First Ordeal of Galaxy Battle"; Transliteration: "Shouri e no Totsunyuu" (Japanese: 勝利への突入!)	April 29, 1994
5	"Desperate Exodus"; Transliteration: "Kesshi no Dasshutsu Sakusen" (Japanese: 決死の脱出作戦)	May 6, 1994
6	"Headlong Charge to Enemy's Flag Ship"; Transliteration: "Nagurikomi Senkan" (Japanese: なぐりこみ戦艦)	May 13, 1994
7	"Rescue of Rogina"; Transliteration: "Rouha o Sukue!" (Japanese: 狼刃を救え!)	May 20, 1994
8	"Feud Among Three Dominant Forces"; Transliteration: "Hokuten ni Arashi Fuku" (Japanese: 北天に嵐吹く)	May 27, 1994
9	"Destroy the Traitors!"; Transliteration: "Uragirimono o Oe" (Japanese: 裏切り者を追え)	June 3, 1994
10	"Desperate Rescue Operation"; Transliteration: "Sutemi no Kyuushutsu Sakusen" (Japanese: 捨て身の救出作戦)	June 10, 1994
11	"Assassination of Dan-Joe"; Transliteration: "Danjou Ansatsu" (Japanese: 弾正暗殺!)	June 17, 1994
12	"A Man to Kill Thunder Jet"; Transliteration: "Kongou Bakuha Sakusen" (Japanese: 金剛爆破作戦!)	June 24, 1994
13	"Shin, The Genius Strategist"; Transliteration: "Tensai Gunshi! Shishin" (Japanese: 天才軍師! 師真(シシン))	July 1, 1994
14	"Revolt of Garer"; Transliteration: "Gaira Hanran" (Japanese: 骸羅反乱!)	July 8, 1994
15	"Escape From Planet Go-Jo"; Transliteration: "Gojou Dasshutsu Sakusen" (Japanese: 五丈脱出作戦!)	July 15, 1994
16	"Counter-Attack of Queen Massina"; Transliteration: "Masamune no Gyakushuu" (Japanese: 正宗の逆襲!)	July 22, 1994
17	"Defend Nankyo at All Risk!"; Transliteration: "Mamore! Nankyourou" (Japanese: 守れ! 南京楼)	July 29, 1994
18	"Thunder Jet Vs. One-Eyed Dragon"; Transliteration: "Gekitotsu! Rai Tai Masamune" (Japanese: 激突! ライ 対 正宗)	August 5, 1994
19	"Invincible Space Pirate"; Transliteration: "Muteki no Kaizoku Kantai" (Japanese: 無敵の海賊艦隊)	August 12, 1994
20	"Hairbreadth Escape from the Killers"; Transliteration: "Rai! Kiki Ippatsu" (Japanese: ライ! 危機一髪)	August 19, 1994
21	"A Road to the Throne"; Transliteration: "Tenka e no Michi" (Japanese: 天下への道)	August 26, 1994
22	"Hate And Compromise"; Transliteration: "Ute! Nise Koutei" (Japanese: 討て! 偽皇帝)	September 2, 1994
23	"The Great Fortress on Fire"; Transliteration: "Honoo no Taiyousai" (Japanese: 炎の大要塞)	September 9, 1994
24	"One-Man War"; Transliteration: "Tatta Hitori no Sensou" (Japanese: たった一人の戦争)	September 16, 1994
25	"Taskee's Mission Impossible"; Transliteration: "Tasuke no Supai Taisakusen" (Japanese: 太助のスパイ大作戦)	September 23, 1994
26	"Rogina Challenges Thunder Jet"; Transliteration: "Rouha Shutsugeki" (Japanese: 狼刃出撃!)	September 30, 1994
27	"Decisive Battle in Burning Inferno"; Transliteration: "Honoo no Naka no Kessen" (Japanese: 炎の中の決戦)	October 7, 1994
28	"Duel; Thunder Jet vs. Rogina"; Transliteration: "Taiketsu! Rai Tai Rouha" (Japanese: 対決! ライ 対 狼刃)	October 14, 1994
29	"Farewell Rogina"; Transliteration: "Saraba Rouha" (Japanese: さらば狼刃!)	October 21, 1994
30	"An Expected Warship"; Transliteration: "Shutsugeki! Youma Senkan" (Japanese: 出撃! 妖魔戦艦)	October 28, 1994
31	"Fall Of Garer"; Transliteration: "Gaira Shisu" (Japanese: 骸羅(ガイラ)死す!)	November 4, 1994
32	"Escape from Nankyo!"; Transliteration: "Nankyourou Dasshutsu" (Japanese: 南京楼脱出!)	November 11, 1994
33	"Take Back Nankyo!"; Transliteration: "Ute! Rakou Gun" (Japanese: 討て! 羅候軍)	November 18, 1994
34	"Trap of Spelled Dagger"; Transliteration: "Youken no Wana" (Japanese: 妖剣の罠)	November 25, 1994
35	"An Ambitious Warrior"; Transliteration: "Yabou no Wakamusha" (Japanese: 野望の若武者)	December 2, 1994
36	"A Road to the Emperor"; Transliteration: "Teiou e no Michi" (Japanese: 帝王への道)	December 9, 1994
37	"The Last Battle of Pirate-Admiral"; Transliteration: "Gouketsu no Saigo" (Japanese: 豪傑の最後)	December 16, 1994
38	"Crash! Thunder Jet vs. King Racko"; Transliteration: "Gekitotsu! Rai Tai Rakou" (Japanese: 激突! ライ 対 羅候(ラコウ))	December 23, 1994
39	"Gen-Yee's Plot"; Transliteration: "Youma no Takurami" (Japanese: 妖魔のたくらみ)	December 26, 1994
40	"Return of Massina, One Eyed Dragon"; Transliteration: "Masamune no Ketsudan" (Japanese: 正宗の決断)	January 6, 1995
41	"T.J.'S Warship Explodes!"; Transliteration: "Kongou Daibakuhatsu" (Japanese: 金剛大爆発)	January 13, 1995
42	"The Oath of Tramaroon"; Transliteration: "Toramaru no Chikai" (Japanese: 虎丸の誓い)	January 20, 1995
43	"Simone's Dream"; Transliteration: "Shimon no Omoi" (Japanese: 紫紋の想い)	January 27, 1995
44	"Peace Talk"; Transliteration: "Wahei Kaidan" (Japanese: 和平会談)	February 3, 1995
45	"Calm before a Storm"; Transliteration: "Tooi Heiwa" (Japanese: 遠い平和)	February 10, 1995
46	"Prologue of All-Out War"; Transliteration: "Tatakai no Jokyoku" (Japanese: 戦いの序曲)	February 17, 1995
47	"Sishin Lose a Battle!"; Transliteration: "Shishin Yabureru!" (Japanese: 師真(シシン)敗れる!)	February 24, 1995
48	"Merciless Bombard"; Transliteration: "Tatakai no Hate ni" (Japanese: 戦いの果てに)	March 3, 1995
49	"True Identity of Gen-Yee"; Transliteration: "Gen'i no Shoutai" (Japanese: 玄偉の正体)	March 10, 1995
50	"For Love and Friendship"; Transliteration: "Tamashii no Koe ni" (Japanese: 魂の声に)	March 17, 1995
51	"Battle at Twin Planets"; Transliteration: "Nijou Wakusei no Kessen" (Japanese: 二重惑星の決戦)	March 24, 1995
52	"Beyond the Endless Dream"; Transliteration: "Yume no Hate ni" (Japanese: 夢の果てに)	March 31, 1995

=== Video game ===
A hybrid real-time strategy turn-based video game adaptation was released for the Super Nintendo Entertainment System by Angel (Bandai) exclusively in Japan in 1996.

== Legacy ==
The anime adaptation enjoys a cult following in the Arab World thanks to the Arabic dub produced by Venus Centre. It was aired, dubbed, on the kids TV channel "SPACETOON", and known as Hazeem Al Raad هزيم الرعد.

== Reception ==
In The Encyclopedia of Science Fiction, the show is described as inspired by events of the Japanese Sengoku period and Chinese historical novel Romance of the Three Kingdoms, incorporating feudal Japanese and Chinese customs and transplanting historical warlord conflicts into a Space Opera setting, with "a dose of Military SF thrown in for good measure". The series' tone and visuals favor romanticized spectacle over scientific realism. The entry also notes that the show that became very popular in the Middle East, and was also popular in Latin America and China, but still remains virtually unknown in the West, where it was never broadcast. For English audiences, it can be seen as an example of a "lost" space-opera, one of the few longer 1990s anime that still lack a decent English release or even a fan translation.
