= Studio Proteus =

Defunct American manga import and localization company

- Industry: Comics
- Founded: 1986
- Defunct: 2004
- Fate: Acquired by Dark Horse Comics
- Headquarters: San Francisco, California
- Website: studioproteus.com

Studio Proteus was a Japanese manga import, translation and lettering company, founded in 1986 by Toren Smith and based in San Francisco. Other staff included translators Dana Lewis, Alan Gleason, and Frederik Schodt, letterer Tom Orzechowski and translator/letterer Tomoko Saito. The company worked with a number of different publishers, including Viz Media, Innovation Publishing and Eclipse Comics, but its main outlets were Dark Horse for mainstream titles and Fantagraphics' imprint Eros Comix for adult (hentai) titles.

== History ==
=== Early years (1986–1994) ===
Smith first became interested in anime and manga after being introduced to it by James D. Hudnall in 1982. Smith had been involved in the comics business as a writer for several years, doing stories for Marvel's Epic magazine and Eclipse Comics. He felt that there was a market for Japanese comics (manga) in the United States, and with Hudnall, approached Eclipse Comics with the idea of obtaining rights to various titles including Akira. The unknowns and difficulties of dealing with Japanese publishers led that first attempt to fail. Smith then decided that the only solution was for him to go to Japan and arrange things directly. At about this time, noted manga expert Frederik Schodt introduced Smith to Seiji Horibuchi, who was then planning the foundation of the company that would be called Viz Media. Schodt felt that Smith's knowledge of the American comics industry and Horibuchi's connections to Japanese publishing giant Shogakukan would make an ideal team. However, a falling-out between Smith and Horibuchi after a year of working together to start Viz led Smith to found his own company, Studio Proteus, although Smith co-translated several manga for Viz, including Nausicaä of the Valley of Wind (at the express request of the creator, Hayao Miyazaki).

In 1986, Smith moved to Japan to try to license manga for publication in America, having previously made arrangements with Eclipse Comics to provide the publication support. Studio Proteus was designed to be a "packager", delivering completed materials to an existing publisher. Studio Proteus would be responsible for choice (with approval of the American publisher), acquisition (contracts and negotiations with the licensor), and production of the translation and lettering, delivering completed pages to the publisher. The publisher would be responsible for advertising and soliciting sales, arranging for distribution, plus collection and disbursement of income. While the industry term "packager" is more accurate, to avoid confusion the relationship was generally referred to as "co-publishing". Smith preferred to work on a profit-sharing basis, believing it led to a greater sense of responsibility on both sides. Smith also insisted on shared ownership of the derivative copyright in the translations, which was to save his company in the future. By the early nineties, Studio Proteus was working with three publishers: Eclipse Comics, Innovation Publishing and Dark Horse. Work with Eclipse had begun within a few months of Smith's first trip to Japan. When Eclipse did not want to open any more publishing slots for manga, Smith went to San Diego Comic-Con in 1988 and licensed Johji Manabe's Outlanders to the fledgling Dark Horse Comics. Smith originally was unable to sell the comic to Dark Horse, but met fantasy writer Raymond E. Feist for dinner that evening. Feist gave Smith the advice he considered the most valuable business advice of his career: "Don't tell them how good it is; tell them how much money they are going to make." The following day Smith sold Outlanders to Dark Horse and Yuzo Takada's 3×3 Eyes to Innovation.

Studio Proteus was, from the beginning, quality oriented. Smith refused to work from photocopies of published books, instead shooting directly from the original art. The techniques for retouching the sound effects were developed by award-winning comics letterer Thomas Orzechowski, and later refined by Japanese manga artist Tomoko Saito. All translators had over a decade of experience and had written books, magazine articles, and fiction outside of their translation work. To encourage quality production, page rates for Studio Proteus letterers and translators were the highest in the industry, and they were also paid royalties—a practice unique to Studio Proteus. In some cases, original covers were commissioned from the manga artists themselves.

The early years of publishing manga in America were surprisingly successful, buoyed by the new popularity of black and white comics in the direct sales market, and Marvel's bestselling colorized version of Akira. This grace period came to an end when the black and white comics boom imploded in 1988. Both Viz and Studio Proteus had been experimenting with a wide variety of manga genres, but when the market tightened only those which appealed to the core "comic book store" market survived. It was not to be until the early 21st century that manga would again cover so large a range of subjects.

Studio Proteus was heavily involved in the promotion of manga and anime during the early years, and Smith gave multiple interviews, appeared on television and radio (including MTV and Canada's Basic Black), and spoke at Georgetown University and the Smithsonian as well as writing dozens of articles for magazines. Working together with anime company Gainax, Studio Proteus also organized the first large anime and manga convention, AnimeCon '91. However, Smith publicly admitted that, as a very private person, he was not fond of these promotional activities. As soon as other spokespeople for manga and anime appeared (such as Trish Ledoux of Animag), he retired from the public eye and rarely gave interviews after approximately 1993.

In 1994, due to Eclipse Comics' failure to pay owed profit share monies, Studio Proteus legally acquired all shared translation rights and production materials for all of their co-published manga. These were re-licensed to Dark Horse Comics and immediately made Dark Horse the second largest manga publisher in America. When Eclipse declared bankruptcy, Smith paid all outstanding royalties due to his Japanese licensors out of existing Studio Proteus funds.

All Studio Proteus titles were Toren Smith's personal picks, which were then accepted and approved by the publishers. If it was rejected by the first publisher, it was offered to another. If rejected by all, it was abandoned. Smith's instincts turned out to almost always be right, even when his thinking was highly unconventional. In 1994 Smith convinced Dark Horse to publish Oh My Goddess!, although Dark Horse had so little faith in this manga (despite cross promotion with the AnimEigo OAV release), Smith had to guarantee them against losses. Oh My Goddess! became a surprise hit, and for years was one of Dark Horse's bestselling manga titles. In addition, it was one of the first translated manga to attract a large female audience, along with Ranma ½.

=== Middle years (1995–2001) ===
Throughout the 1990s, the team of Dark Horse and Studio Proteus was one of the two largest manga publishers in the U.S., competing with Viz. The crash of the direct sales market in the middle nineties had a tremendous impact on the manga business, another blow after the previous bust in 1988. By the time the market had reorganized, there was only one distributor left (Diamond Distributors) and over half of the comic stores in America were out of business. Manga's growing popularity saved it from the worst, but nearly one third of all manga titles were canceled due to lack of sales, and continuing difficulty in getting the trade paperback collections (graphic novels) into bookstores left manga stalled in the marketplace for several years. Studio Proteus responded by streamlining the production process and working with smaller bookstore distributors to whom manga represented a valuable percentage of their sales.

The slump in the comics market in the late 1990s affected the sales of all manga published in America. None of the attempts by American manga publishers to create a manga anthology magazine such as Tokyopop Magazine and Viz's Animerica Extra with several stories running simultaneously were successful at this time, and were mostly viewed as loss-leaders for future sales of the collections. Super Manga Blast, the Dark Horse/Studio Proteus magazine, gave Smith an opportunity to bring readers in via titles of known popularity, such as Oh My Goddess!, and get them to try something different, such as Club 9.

=== Later years, criticism and buyout (2002–2004) ===
As times changed, however, Toren Smith developed an acrimonious relationship with the more hardcore parts of manga fandom. As shōjo manga became increasingly popular, fans berated Studio Proteus and Dark Horse for not releasing any shōjo, despite Smith's repeated explanation that since he did not enjoy shōjo manga, and knew little about it, he had no interest in releasing any. Studio Proteus' initial output was predominantly science fiction and action; this may have reflected Smith's tastes as a writer and member of SFWA, but also reflected the tastes of the American comics direct market (who were the primary purchasers of manga at that time) and manga fandom of the 1980s and 1990s. However, Studio Proteus also released non–science fiction manga such as Makoto Kobayashi's relationship comedy Club 9 and the pet manga What's Michael?

However, Toren Smith continued to vocally defend "flopped" manga up until 2002, at a time when it was growing unpopular even among mainstream manga fandom. He became perceived as a conservative force in manga publishing, despite his publication of non-mainstream manga such as the transhumanist manga Version, and The Rebel Sword, a manga about Kurdish revolutionaries, and his decades of effort in popularizing manga and dedication to quality production. However, by the end of 2002, Smith was convinced that his belief that readers would have difficulty adapting to read manga "backwards" (also known as "unflopped", reading right to left as in the original Japanese publication) was incorrect, citing the fact that an entire generation of new manga readers have grown up since he had started Studio Proteus and they did not have the mindset of early manga readers, most of whom came to manga from regular comics. However, he maintained that as long as the distributors were reluctant to buy unflopped manga, there was little anyone could do to try to change the industry.

At that time, the comic book direct market was still shrinking, while manga sales in bookstores were growing, although not very quickly. Smith had pointed out for a number of years that the problem with the bookstore market was a lack of support from the buyers at the chains, and lack of designated shelf space (comics were often racked with art books or science fiction and fantasy). Smith often cited Tokyopop's poor sales of their first experiments with unflopped manga as proof the problem was very real. In 2002, Dark Horse's graphic novel distributor LPC Group went bankrupt, hurting the presence of Dark Horse (and thus Studio Proteus) manga in bookstores. The fortunes of manga in America were changed forever that year when Kurt Hassler of Borders (who has been called "The Most Powerful Person in Manga" by ICV2, a designation Smith has publicly agreed with, adding that he considers him "[T]he most important person in the history of American manga") successfully persuaded Waldenbooks to commit to racking a large quantity of unflopped manga titles, even placing them in "dump bins" near the cash registers. This was the turning point for manga sales in America, and the resulting success of what is now considered a "standard" manga (small, unflopped paperbacks at approximately $9.99) more than doubled the size of established manga publishers such as Viz, and raised Tokyopop (Waldenbooks' partner in the venture) to prominence. However, the upheaval in the manga market caused by Hassler's opening of the door to bulk sales of unflopped manga spelled the end for Super Manga Blast and in the chaos surrounding the conversion of most of Dark Horse's manga to the prevailing unflopped standard, almost none of the series running in the magazine were continued as graphic novels, even though some (such as Club 9) had already been completed.

While Smith had finally become comfortable with the idea of unflopped manga now that bookstores were willing to buy it, it had become clear that the industry was becoming big business, with publishers such as Del Rey and DC getting involved in manga, and Japanese companies such as Shogakukan beginning to treat their American operations as serious businesses instead of sidelines. "I'm just a manga fan who started my company because no one else was [publishing manga in English]," he commented on the Studio Proteus website. "To move ahead now would require me to become more of a corporate type, and I know that's not for me."

In February 2004, Dark Horse Comics announced that it had purchased the publication rights to Studio Proteus translations (not, as was widely and erroneously reported, the company itself). Toren Smith stayed on as an adviser and translator for selected titles, but by 2006 he had left completely. In a 2004 interview with The Comics Journal, he expressed his reasons for essentially selling the company he had founded: "I was burning out. Over 15 years I had put out 70,000 pages of manga. I had no life...Tokyopop puts out more in a month than I've put out in my entire career. The manga business kind of moved out of my league. But if anyone believes that expansion can continue indefinitely, they're incorrect. Booms are always followed by a bust... My opinion is that what has occurred is the commodification of the product. All [bookstore retailers] care about is how it's formatted and what it costs...For a long time, America has seen nothing but the best of the Japanese comics, but there's lots of crap over there. There may be some smart bookstore buyers out there who can distinguish between them, but I've never met them." His controversial predictions—informed by his experience with the comics crashes of the 80s and 90s—were borne out and the manga industry has weathered a severe boom-and-bust cycle since then, with publishers such as Tokyopop cutting their releases by over 40% in June 2008, and laying off 36 employees, and laying off 15 more employees in December 2008 and others (e.g. Broccoli Books) pulling out of the market entirely. The trend has continued with Viz cutting 60 personnel and DC shutting down their CMX manga imprint and Tokyopop finally shuttering their U.S. publishing operations in May 2011. However, Smith also predicted the market would eventually stabilize at a sustainable level and not disappear completely.

Smith stated that he is "regretful" that the flopped/non-flopped controversy of the last few years of his career seem to have overshadowed his twenty years of fighting to promote and publish quality manga.

The last manga produced by Studio Proteus staff in the flipped, left-to-right, American comic format was the Blade of the Immortal #131 in November 2007, making it the longest-running manga ever published in the American format. The series then moved to graphic-novel-only format.

Toren Smith also did manga work outside of Studio Proteus, such as editing Tori Miki's Anywhere But Here, writing afterwords for various manga collections in Japan such as the hardcover reissue of Masahiko Kikuni's Gekko no Sasayaki and Kenji Tsuruta's Suiso - Hydrogen, consulting on English for anime companies, and other manga and anime-related activities in the United States and Japan.

== Awards and nominations ==
Despite the relatively small output of Studio Proteus compared to the major manga publishers in America, the company collected a large number of awards and nominations for their publications.

Awards won by Studio Proteus manga:

- What's Michael?, New York Library Book Award, 1991
- Blade of the Immortal, Will Eisner Comics Industry Award, 2000
- Lone Wolf and Cub, Will Eisner Comics Industry Award, 2001
- Akira, Will Eisner Comics Industry Award, 2002
- The Legend of Mother Sarah, Parent's Choice Award, 1995
- What's Michael?, Parent's Choice Award, 1997
- Lone Wolf and Cub, Harvey Awards, 2001
- Lone Wolf and Cub, (Best U.S. Edition of Foreign Material) Eisner Awards, 2001
- Lone Wolf and Cub, Harvey Awards, 2002
- Lone Wolf and Cub, Harvey Awards, 2003
- Akira (dual awards: Best Archival Collection/Project and Best U.S. Edition of Foreign Material), Eisner Awards, 2002
- Anywhere But Here, Entertainment Weekly's Top Ten #1, 2005

Award nominations:

- What's Michael?, Eisner Award, 1998
- Blade of the Immortal, Eisner Award, 1999
- Intron Depot 2: Blades, Eisner Award (Best U.S. Edition of Foreign Material), 1999
- Intron Depot 2: Blades, Eisner Award (Best Comics-Related Book), 1999
- Nausicaa, Harvey Awards, 1990
- Appleseed, Harvey Awards, 1990
- Ghost in the Shell, Harvey Awards, 1996
- Nausicaa of the Valley of the Wind, Harvey Awards, 1996
- Oh My Goddess!, Harvey Awards, 1997
- Gunsmith Cats, Harvey Awards, 1997
- Nausicaa of the Valley of the Wind, Eisner Awards, 1998
- Blade of the Immortal, Harvey Awards, 1998
- Oh My Goddess!, Harvey Awards, 1998
- Blade of the Immortal, Harvey Awards, 1999
- Blade of the Immortal, Harvey Awards, 2001
- Lone Wolf and Cub, Harvey Awards, 2001
- Akira, Eisner Awards, 2001
- Lone Wolf and Cub, Eisner Awards (Best Archival Collection/Project), 2001
- Akira, Harvey Awards, 2002
- Lone Wolf and Club, Harvey Awards, 2002
- What's Michael?, Eisner Awards (Best Writer/Artist: Humor), 2002
- Super Manga Blast, Harvey Awards, 2002
- Super Manga Blast, Eisner Awards (Best Anthology), 2003
- What's Michael?, Eisner Awards (Best Humor Publication), 2004

== Publications ==
See Eros Comix for hentai titles

Titles co-published by Studio Proteus, and their initial U.S. publication dates, include:

- 3×3 Eyes (1991)
- Akira (1988)
- Anywhere but Here (2004)
- Appleseed (1988)
- Blade of the Immortal (1996)
- Cannon God Exaxxion (2001)
- Caravan Kidd (1992)
- Chronowar (1996)
- Club 9 (2001)
- Cyber 7 (1989)
- The Dirty Pair: Biohazards (1988)
- The Dirty Pair: Dangerous Acquaintances (1989)
- The Dirty Pair: A Plague of Angels (1990)
- Dominion (1993)
- Domu (1995)
- Drakuun (1997)
- Ghost in the Shell (1995)
- Gunsmith Cats (1995)
- Hellhounds: Panzer Cops (1994)
- Intron Depot 1 (1992)
- Intron Depot 2: Blades (1992)
- Intron Depot 3: Ballistics (1992)
- Intron Depot 4: Bullets (1992)
- The Legend of Kamui (1987)
- The Legend of Mother Sarah (1995)
- Lone Wolf and Cub (2000)
- Lost Continent (1990)
- Metropolis (2003)
- Nausicaä of the Valley of the Wind (1988)
- Oh My Goddess! (1994)
- Outlanders (1988)
- The Rebel Sword (1994)
- Seraphic Feather (2000)
- Shadow Lady (1998)
- Shadow Star (2000)
- Spirit of Wonder (1996)
- The Two Faces of Tomorrow (1997)
- The Venus Wars (1991)
- Version (1992)
- What's Michael? (1990)
- You're Under Arrest! (1995)

== Anime translations ==
- Ghost in the Shell (script rewrite)
- The Venus Wars (subtitles)
