= The Dirty Pair =

English-language comic based on the anime

- Cover to Dirty Pair: Run From the Future trade paperback

Publication information
- Publisher: Eclipse Comics (United States); Dark Horse Comics (United States); Manga Publishing (United Kingdom); Semic Comics (France)
- Format: Multiple limited series
- Publication date: 1988–2002
- No. of issues: 28
- Main characters: Kei; Yuri

Creative team
- Created by: Haruka Takachiho
- Written by: Adam Warren; Toren Smith
- Penciller: Adam Warren
- Inkers: Adam Warren; Karl Story; Tom Simmons; Robert Dejesus; Jason Martin; Jim Royal; Tomoko Saito; Dan Brereton; Lela Dowling; Lea Hernandez; Ken Macklin; Joe Rosas
- Colorists: Guru eFX; Ryan Kinnaird; Robert Perchaluk; Margaret Hessian; Joe Rosas; Dave Nestelle; Gina Going

Collected editions
- Biohazards: ISBN 1-56971-339-1
- Dangerous Acquaintances: ISBN 1560601167
- A Plague of Angels: ISBN 1569710295
- Sim Hell: ISBN 1569717427
- Fatal But Not Serious: ISBN 1569711720
- Run from the Future: ISBN 1569715777

The Dirty Pair is an original English-language manga written and illustrated by Adam Warren, based on the original Dirty Pair characters created by Haruka Takachiho.

The American comic company and manga translator Studio Proteus acquired the rights to create comic versions of the Dirty Pair in 1988. The first three limited series, reprinted in the collected editions Biohazards, Dangerous Acquaintances, and Plague of Angels, were published by the since-defunct Eclipse Comics. Later, the rights were transferred to Dark Horse Comics. The first three series were written by Toren Smith and Adam Warren and drawn by Warren—after that, Smith left the project and Warren took over writing completely. These stories have a much more cyberpunk style than the other versions; the later stories, starting with "Fatal But Not Serious", move into the transhuman and posthuman subgenres.

== The Lovely Angels ==
Kei and Yuri are two Trouble Consultants (Criminal Division, Class A) for the World Welfare Work Association (3WA), code-named "Lovely Angels", but known throughout the United Galactica (UG) as the "Dirty Pair", a nickname given to them by the press due to their bad luck with their missions, which always seem to end in complete disaster. But they are always cleared of any wrongdoing by the UG's Central Computer because the extreme damage is never actually their fault (though their mere presence has been known to make things worse).

They originally met at Meizuru university for Lucien genetic upgrades around A.D. 2134, although it is not necessarily canon, they were both misfits within their year, and so became friends. Around A.D. 2137, just before graduation from Meizuru university, they played a prank on their friends, convincing them that they were both psychic. Shortly afterwards, news reached the 3WA and they were scouted for recruitment and tested by a parapsychology institute. The pair cheated every which way possible (the really short skirts were Kei's idea), and they tested positive for clairvoyance; the 3WA considered this to be useful and hired them.

Although outwardly they almost constantly fight and bicker with each other, they are both loyal best friends, always pairing up together to deck anyone that calls them by their "Dirty Pair" nickname.

=== Kei ===
Kei, 19, was born November 27, 2122. She is a Lucien-type genetic upgrade, has long red hair with large bangs, brown eyes (more often than not green), is 171 cm tall and weighs 59 kg. Kei shares the same Lucien genetic code somatotype as Yuri, meaning that their bodies are basically identical, including height. Kei is the tomboy of the pair, outgoing, loud, and boisterous. She has remarked that she is "the exciting half of our team" and that "drinking or sex would be my responsibilities". Although she often fights and argues with Yuri, she has displayed a much softer side to her personality, revealing in the Sim Hell mini-series that her biggest fear is that of losing Yuri, and having very watery eyes over the death of the original Yuri during Fatal But Not Serious. Kei has a passion for cheesecake, large firearms, and bleeding edge mecha and war-tech.

=== Yuri ===
The original Yuri was born March 18, 2122; and the current clone on September 12, 2141. She is a Lucien-type genetic upgrade, has long black hair, blue eyes, is 171 cm tall and weighs 58 kg. Yuri shares the same Lucien genetic code somatotype as Kei, meaning that their bodies are basically identical, including height. Yuri is the more stereotypical retro-feminine of the two, being the more demure, modest, polite, and friendly of the two. This appears to stem from her traditional Japanese upbringing, and possibly from her fears of what other people think of her in regard to all the disasters they have been indirectly involved in. During the plot line of Fatal But Not Serious, another version of her was cloned from her stolen personality construct and tissue samples kept on record at the 3WA. The cloned version of Yuri had a "seratonin-based progressive imbalance" set into her neurochemistry to make her psychotically suicidal, and was tasked with the mission of killing the original Kei and Yuri (which she believed to be a simulation). She was partially successful, terminating only the original Yuri. Shortly after, the cloned Yuri received medical attention, and is now identical to the original Yuri. Although she often fights with her partner Kei, she has a deep devotion to her best friend. In Sim Hell, while dining with "an old friend", Dan, she spoke of nothing but Kei, and when it was revealed Kei was in danger, ran immediately to her aid. In Fatal But Not Serious, Yuri could not bring herself to kill Kei in cold blood, despite her neurochemistry imbalance. It is also revealed that Yuri has a deep admiration for Kei's rebel side, stealing her stuff in Fatal But Not Serious and acting the "bad girl", as well as attempting to act more like Kei after they engaged synchronous puppet mode, taking control of each other's bodies and trading perps in Run From the Future.

== Publications ==
=== Biohazards ===
Biohazards is an original English-language manga written by Toren Smith and Adam Warren and illustrated by Warren, based on the Dirty Pair characters created by Haruka Takachiho. The series was originally published by Eclipse Comics between December 1988 and April 1989, and was first published in paperback and hardcover graphic novel format in 1990. With the transfer of the property rights to Dark Horse Comics, Biohazards was republished as a trade paperback entitled Dirty Pair: Biohazards – 10th Anniversary Special Edition in September 1998. This edition includes the 8-page short story I Honestly Hate You from the 1994 San Diego Comic Con Comics #3 as a bonus.

==== Plot ====
The Lovely Angels are assigned to Pacifica. Tissue samples and the single surviving brainchip of leading biotechnical engineer Kelvin A. O'Donnell have been stolen by agents of Abraham Streib, a rival industrialist maimed in an accident apparently staged by O'Donnell. Enter the Dirty Pair, who rescue O'Donnell's brainchip, implanted by Streib in a cuddly Pseudo-Fuzzy. Mission accomplished, but O'Donnell convinces the Angels of Streib's traffic in illegal bioweapons, and persuades them to help him retrieve his tissue samples so he can regain his humanity. His consciousness transferred to a synthetic warbeast, O'Donnell leads the Pair to Streib's lab, obliterating most of his cronies—and a sizable section of Pacifica's capital city. O'Donnell assures the destruction of Streib's operation, and of Streib himself, but, en route home, is arrested by Pacifica Security for unlawful bioweapons production of his own.

=== Dangerous Acquaintances ===
Dangerous Acquaintances is an original English-language manga written Toren Smith and Adam Warren and illustrated by Warren, based on the Dirty Pair characters created by Haruka Takachiho. The series was originally published by Eclipse Comics between June 1989 and March 1990, and was first published in paperback and hardcover graphic novel format in 1991. With the transfer of the property rights to Dark Horse Comics, Dangerous Acquaintances was republished as a trade paperback in June 1997.

The 1997 reissue of the story features edited artwork for the chapters that comprise issues 3 through 5 of the original publication. The edits made were to Kei and Yuri's waitress costumes. In the original publication the costumes were Playboy Bunny costumes, though never referred to as such specifically. In the 1997 reprint the ears and tails were digitally removed from all of the panels in which they appear, though in some panels the shadows on the walls behind the characters still have the ears and tails.

==== Plot ====
The Lovely Angels are on vacation on the planet of Rocinante when they spot an old "acquaintance", Shasti. Kei and Yuri immediately attack Shasti in a drunken rage, but are quickly subdued by the heavily armed and violent local police as Shasti blends into the crowd. Through a series of flashbacks interwoven though the story, the tale of the betrayal, attempted murder, and humiliation of the (then-rookie) pair by the increasingly psychotic superagent Shasti is told. The Lovely Angels start investigating Shasti's presence on the planet, and uncover a nest of apparently unconnected plots that all seem to have Shasti as the leader. Among revolutionaries, a band of thieves after a collection of priceless antiques, and an experimental one-of-a-kind FTL drive installed in an interstellar liner filled with rich and influential potential hostages, the Dirty Pair must determine which is Shasti's real goal and what is simply smokescreen.

=== A Plague of Angels ===
A Plague of Angels is the third original English-language manga version of Haruka Takachiho's Dirty Pair characters, written by Toren Smith and Adam Warren and illustrated by Warren. It was the last Dirty Pair comic that Smith and Warren co-wrote, Warren going on to handle all future writing for the series on his own. The series was originally published by Studio Proteus between August 1990 and November 1991, and has since been collected into a trade paperback, which was reissued by Dark Horse Comics in December 1995.

==== Plot ====
As public outrage peaks, the Angels are restricted to the Kalevala O'Neill Colony to help with local investigations of a technology-smuggling outfit. Meanwhile, the 3WA launches a full-scale public relations assault, commissioning a glowingly positive profile for High Sense magazine. As the Pair turn a routine stake-out into a free-for-all, ambitious reporter Cory Emerson takes the assignment. Cory arrives to find the Pair in trouble with security for the stake-out fiasco, which nonetheless has revealed the nature of their adversaries: artificial personalities encoded on micro-software plugs enabling the smugglers to move between host bodies. The Angels, with Cory in tow, go solo to crack the ring, but the smugglers unleash their secret weapon: a robot using a maniacal artificial personality that threatens to blow everyone up using a low-yield gravity bomb. The Pair successfully defeat the robot, but the bomb does not seem to be with it anymore.

=== Sim Hell ===
Sim Hell is the fourth original English-language manga version of Haruka Takachiho's Dirty Pair characters, written and illustrated by Adam Warren. It was the first Dirty Pair comic that saw Warren handle all the writing, having previously co-wrote with Toren Smith. The series was originally published by Dark Horse Comics between May and August 1993, and has since been collected into a trade paperback. Later, a colorized, reissued version (Sim Hell Remastered) was published between May and August 2001.

==== Plot ====
The Lovely Angels report to the 3WA headquarters for Kei's annual evaluative assessment by the top-secret Central Computer, the 3WA's "chief operating entity". Before any direct examination can take place, Kei must first participate via neural interface in several computer-generated interactive simulations, or "sims". Something goes awry and Kei is seemingly trapped in a potentially lethal feedback loop with the computers running the simulation. Yuri jacks in to the sim's virtual reality to save Kei, but soon finds that both of them are now stuck in an endless series of simulations. Initially, the Angels struggle through historical sims, set decades earlier during the genocidal "Nanoclysm", a plague of artificially intelligent Nanoviruses that nearly annihilated humanity. They discover that they are trapped in simulations belonging to the shadowy Bureau of Technological Regulation (BTR), a secretive group whose business is the control of certain dangerous technologies. Eventually, Kei and Yuri stumble upon a private sim owned by Kevin Sleet, their obnoxious tormentor from the BTR. There, they find that a rogue faction of the BTR, using supposedly forbidden technologies, intends to seize control of the 3WA's Central Computer and use its formidable powers to help mount a paramilitary coup of human civilization. But worst of all, the Angels discover that Sleet plans on a future where clones of Kei and Yuri serve as his personal harem. Nauseated, our heroines head for a final confrontation with the nefarious lout. They find the Central Computer is not without its own defenses.

=== "I Honestly Hate You" ===
"I Honestly Hate You" is an eight-page short story originally published in August 1994 in the (annual) San Diego Comic Con Comics #3 (reprinted in 1998 by Dark Horse Comics in the Dirty Pair: Biohazards trade paperback).

==== Plot ====
Kei decides that she has had enough of dealing with Yuri's personality and derisive comments. She equips herself with fighting equipment and storms her room to teach her a lesson.

==== Drawing style ====
First page from Dirty Pair: Biohazards 10th Anniversary Special Edition

The black-and-white drawing style is reminiscent of Japanese manga, with heavy usage of gray-scale sheets, panels arriving to the edge of the pages on all four edges, kinetic lines showing movement, and some panels having no borders or being inclined to a side to show the direction of action.

=== Fatal But Not Serious ===
Fatal But Not Serious is the sixth original English-language manga version of Haruka Takachiho's Dirty Pair characters, written and illustrated by Adam Warren. The series was originally published by Dark Horse Comics between July and November 1995, and has since been collected into a trade paperback.

==== Plot ====
While the majority of humanity still lives in fear of the Dirty Pair and their well-publicized "disastrous proclivities", a surprising number of people have, for a wide variety of reasons, chosen to embrace the Lovely Angels as beloved, if destructive, "idol figures". Recently, the Pair's galaxy-wide cult following has grown large enough to support an actual convention celebrating their dubious celebrity. In a doomed bid to generate some positive media coverage, the Lovely Angels themselves are attending this "Kei'n'YuriCon '41" as guests of honor, but their enemies are conspiring to derail this ill-fated "charm offensive". Just before the convention, the Lovely Angels defeated a terrorist group in a bloody battle that left Kei with a broken leg. The surviving terrorist sought his revenge by unleashing a tailored "neurovirus", designed to trigger an anti-Dirty Pair hysteria and mob violence at the convention. More ominously, a renegade branch of the 3WA has stolen the Lovely Angel's "back-up copy" personality constructs and tissue samples, generated a memory-intact clone of Yuri, and duped the freshly grown Angel into thinking she is undergoing an interactive simulation, a bizarre virtual reality scenario that requires her to assassinate the original Kei and Yuri. In typical Dirty Pair fashion, she is going to accomplish her mission beyond the shadow of a doubt, by causing the local sun to go supernova. Fortunately, the planetary authorities drew up plans to evacuate the system when they heard the Dirty Pair would be attending.

==== Drawing style ====
This series uses finished artwork that is inked and colored. The character designs use plain colors without gradients and shadows are done with zones of darker plain colors or with black zones, similar to anime. Cinetic lines are heavily used to represent movement, like Japanese manga. The environments are all futuristic.

=== Start the Violence ===
Start the Violence is a one-shot comic featuring the original English-language manga version of Haruka Takachiho's Dirty Pair characters, written and illustrated by Adam Warren. It was included in the Dirty Pair: Run From the Future trade paperback by Dark Horse Comics in January 2002. It was also published in three parts in Dark Horse Presents issues 132–134.

=== Run from the Future ===
Run from the Future is the eighth original English-language manga version of Haruka Takachiho's Dirty Pair characters, written and illustrated by Adam Warren. The series was originally published by Dark Horse Comics between January and April 2000, and has since been collected into a trade paperback.

==== Plot ====
Kei and Yuri, disguised as a pregnant Shasti and an overweight male model, with EPD (Explosive Personality Disorder) Eddie, travel to the covert trade and technology nexus of the Nimkasi, a Dyson tree habitat, where the 3WA have scored a deal with the Black Market habitat to poach 50 of the worst "crims, terrs, and pirates" from its megatree branches, in less than 100 minutes. Subduing, arresting, and battling with a sentient Smart Cloth "Living Leather" suit, a French post-human terrorist leader and his mechas, terrorist artists, bio-tattooed orcas, the blood-thirsty Teddy Roosevelt gladiator, Kei's schoolgirl crush, and Binky. The Lovely Angels may just pull off their first ever "collateral damage"-free mission, but a trip down memory lane for Yuri and Kei's own faith issues conspire against them. In the end, the Angels are successful (if only for a short while), but narrowly miss seeing the real Shasti.

=== "A Big 'Merci Beaucoup'" ===
"A Big 'Merci Beaucoup'" is a six-page story originally published from May to August 2001 in the back of each colorized reissue of Sim Hell, and later in the back of the colorized Sim Hell reissued trade paperback (2002).

==== Plot ====
This short story consists of a series of flashbacks about how the relationship between Yuri and Kei has evolved over time. The flashbacks include events ranging from the time when both attended school to the current time, including, for example, their training at the 3WA.

==== Drawing style ====
Character Kei, drawn with pencil and with penciled shadows, no inking

The pages are greyscale reproductions of tight pencil "layouts", like the Empowered pages, and they are neither inked nor toned.
