= Toren Smith =

Canadian manga translator

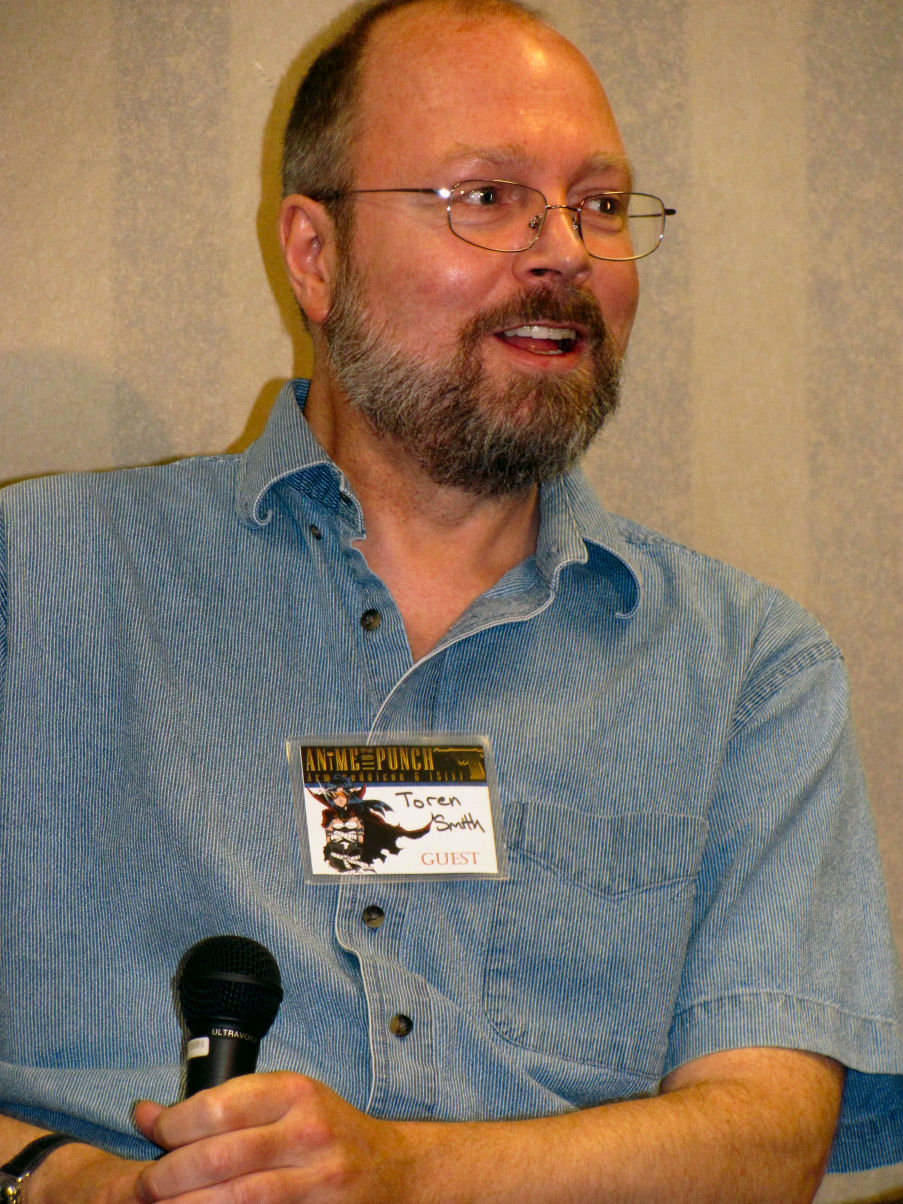
- Toren Smith being interviewed at Anime Punch 6, on April 23, 2011, in Columbus, Ohio
- Born: Toren V. Smith; April 12, 1960 Alberta, Canada
- Died: March 4, 2013 (aged 52) San Francisco, California, U.S.
- Notable works: The Dirty Pair
- Spouses: Lela Dowling (m. 1981; div. 1984) Tomoko Saitou (m. 1991)

Toren V. Smith (April 12, 1960 – March 4, 2013) was a Canadian manga translator and founder of Studio Proteus.

== Early life ==
Smith learned to read by the age of four, and by the age of 12 had won his first award for writing from the Calgary Stampede and Exhibition. By thirteen he had sold his first magazine article, an examination of body morphology in deep sea fishes, which included drawings by himself. In 1974 his science fair project in physics with Martin Brock won first place in the Physics category and they moved on to competition in London, where they took an Honorable Mention. Brock also introduced Smith to comics, which would become a lifetime passion. Smith had already been drawing for years, mostly influenced by newspaper strips such as B.C. and Andy Capp, but now he began to look at the work of Jack Kirby and Walt Kelly. Upon entering high school, Smith became interested in what would now be called extreme sports. He participated in caving, motorcycle racing, climbing, and hang gliding—briefly being the youngest licensed hang glider pilot in Canada. Focusing on climbing, he spent time working at the Lac des Arcs climbing school, being among the first in Canada to experiment with ice climbing tools and techniques. Smith was active in the arts while at school, working with the drama club, writing plays, and drawing for pleasure and sale. After graduating from high school, Smith chose not to attend university, and worked a variety of jobs from oilfield roughneck to computer operator. This gave him the time to pursue climbing and motorcycle touring, combining the two into long trips to places like Yosemite, Black Canyon, and Joshua Tree.

== Comics career ==
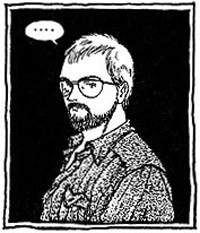
Toren Smith

In 1980 Smith attended a local science fiction convention and met Lela Dowling, a noted SF and fantasy artist. The two hit it off and after extensive correspondence and meetings, they were married in 1981 (div. 1984), and Smith moved to California. There he became a part of the local SF and comics scene, and began writing comics for Epic Illustrated, Eclipse Comics, Amazing Heroes, and others. This work included a collaboration with SF author James P. Hogan, who was to become a close friend of Smith. Smith was introduced to Japanese anime and manga by James Hudnall in 1982, and in 1986 he sold his possessions and moved to Japan in order to found Studio Proteus, a company that was for more than two decades one of the top two producers of translated manga for the English-speaking world.

In a stroke of luck, Hogan invited Smith to accompany him to Daicon V, an SF convention in Osaka, Japan, at which Hogan was Guest of Honor. The connections made by Smith at this convention would prove invaluable, and included Takeda and Okada of Gainax, Osamu Tezuka, Nozomi Ohmori, and Harumichi Aoki. At the convention Masamune Shirow's Appleseed was given the Sei'un-sho award for best manga, and Smith quickly chose it for his first publication in English.

As Smith was the first foreigner to come to Japan with the intention of translating and selling manga in America, he was given many opportunities to meet with curious publishers and professionals, once again a tremendous stroke of luck that allowed him to quickly arrange for several licenses. Still, his life there was difficult as a sudden upswing in the value of the yen just before his departure had cut his limited seed money in half. His first winter in Japan was spent in an unheated 12 m^{2} room with an outside bathroom and only cold running water. He worked out of his closet on a small manual typewriter. The rental agency for the small eight-unit apartment turned out to be run by the mistress of a yakuza member, which Smith found out only when several "heavies" came to collect the rent from a neighbor: Simon Binks of the band Australian Crawl, who had come to Japan to try to get his money from the company to whom he'd sent his classic guitar collection for sale (Binks has his own detailed account of the event on his Wikipedia entry, which includes information not known to Smith at the time). The owner lived just behind the apartment, and raised edible cacti in a large greenhouse there. Smith spent three months working as manager of the apartment in return for free rent, a convenient arrangement that unfortunately came to an end when the yakuza found out.

Smith, who was 6 ft 2 in (1.88 m), arrived in Japan weighing 190 pounds (86 kg), and left nine months later weighing 163 pounds (74 kg) because he had little money for food. In order to extend his visa beyond the normal limits, Smith was assisted by famous Japanese SF writer and translator Tetsu Yano, who wrote him a letter of recommendation.

After spending several months in the United States working with Eclipse Comics to publish the manga he had selected, he returned to Japan and continued his work. This time he was invited to stay at GAINAX House, a house rented by Gainax to house animators. About twelve animators lived there, stacked up in bunk beds in every room. Smith was given a walk-in closet to live in, and there he spend his second winter in Japan—in an unheated room of 8 m^{2}, working off of a shelf on a scavenged IBM Selectric (which eventually broke down and caught fire while he was working on it). Yasuhiro Takeda of Gainax mentions Smith in his 2002 autobiography, The Notenki Memoirs:

Not too long after the move, we became acquainted with another otaku who had come from North America (Canada, actually). His name was Toren Smith, and his love of manga had brought him all the way across the ocean to Japan. He'd run out of money somewhere along the way, however, and was having a hard time of it. Apparently, Okada had met Smith during our Osaka days. The Canadian had visited the General Products store in Momodani with sci-fi author J.P. Hogan, who was in Japan for the Sci-Fi Convention. Naturally, after hearing his foreign friend was down on his luck, Okada suggested we put him up at GAINAX House. Toren went on to be a success in his own right, later returning to North America and becoming president of a publishing company in the U.S. He is one shrewd fellow—not only did he make plenty of manga-related connections while he was here, but he snagged himself a beautiful Japanese wife to boot. I still remember one morning, shortly after we all woke up; the door to Toren's room opened and out walked a young lady we'd never seen before!

Smith's time at GAINAX House was challenging, not least of all because the other occupants of the house had very loose ideas about hygiene. Once again, Takeda comments:

Make no mistake, GAINAX House was a den of rabid bachelors. Nobody cleaned or even straightened up—ever. When we received a visit from Hiroe Suga (who for a time was staying at a boarding house in Tokyo and working as an author), she was literally sickened by the smell. The color drained from her face and she beat a very hasty retreat. Ultimately, we elected to move out of GAINAX House. When the landlord came by to give the place a once-over and release us from our contract, he was stricken speechless. Almost immediately after we vacated, the house was demolished.

The "beautiful Japanese wife" mentioned by Takeda was Tomoko Saitou (AKA Tomoyuki Saitou, Asuka Rei, and later, Tomoko Saitou Smith). Saitou was an illustrator working with Hiroe Suga to illustrate her fantasy novels. Saitou also designed the characters for the computer game Animal Magnetism, and has done much other work. After joining Smith in the United States, she continued to publish manga and illustrations (including a cover for Science Magazine and providing yaoi pages for Adam Warren's Empowered Volume 3), and worked as a letterer for Smith's company Studio Proteus. Smith and Saitou were married in 1991.

In 1988, Gainax produced the anime OAV series Gunbuster, and named one of the characters after Smith. Smith and Saitou also contributed background voices to the anime. Also in 1988, Smith's company Studio Proteus began co-publishing with Dark Horse Comics, a rewarding partnership that continued until 2004. Their first manga was Johji Manabe's Outlanders.

Smith traveled back and forth from Japan to the United States several times a year for nearly two decades. In order to save money early on, many of these trips were made as a "courier" for companies that used a passenger's baggage allowance to inexpensively ship valuable documents and cargo. Due to his constant travels, Smith eventually found himself pulled aside at Customs and Immigration, and in front of a "stone-faced" Immigration Officer who wanted to know exactly why he was spending so much time in Japan. Smith produced a copy of The Legend of Kamui from his carry-on bag. The officer turned out to be a big fan of the original manga, and Smith was quickly cut loose.

As profit-sharing money finally began to roll in, Smith's situation improved, and eventually he rented an apartment in San Francisco with comic artist Adam Warren and later purchased a house there. As well as managing Studio Proteus, Smith worked as co-translator on 34 manga series, totaling nearly 80,000 pages. He also co-wrote the first three American Dirty Pair comics with Adam Warren, and the short series Terminator: Hunters and Killers for Dark Horse. Smith commented that out of the top ten manga he most wanted to work on when he moved to Japan, he ended up publishing or co-translating nine.

Smith appeared at multiple anime conventions as a guest. Smith retired in 2004, having sold most of his rights and materials for his entire output of manga to Dark Horse Comics. He spent his last years diving his KISS Sport rebreather around the world, camping and reading while still enjoying manga and anime.

== Death ==
Smith died on March 4, 2013, at the age of 52.

== Selected comics writing works ==
- The Dirty Pair: Biohazards
- The Dirty Pair: Dangerous Acquaintances
- The Dirty Pair: A Plague of Angels
- Terminator: Hunters and Killers
- "Rumiko Takahashi: The Princess of Manga (an interview with Rumiko Takahashi)"

== Anime translation works ==
- Ghost in the Shell (script)
- Venus Wars (subtitles)
