= Livewires (comics) =

Fictional comic book series

Project Livewire
- Cover to "Livewires" #1. Pictured starting from left-top Top: Hollowpoint Ninja and Cornfed. Middle: Gothic Lolita. Bottom: Stem Cell and Social Butterfly. Art by Adam Warren.

Publication information
- Publisher: Marvel Comics
- First appearance: Livewires #1
- Created by: Adam Warren; Rick Mays; Jason Martin (comics)

In-story information
- Base(s): United States, mobile
- Member(s): Cornfed; Gothic Lolita; Hollowpoint Ninja; Homebrew; David Jenkins; Social Butterfly; Stem Cell

Livewires is a six-issue comic book limited series published by Marvel Comics in 2005. The series was written by Adam Warren, who also provided layouts, and pencilled by Rick Mays and Jason Martin.

The series stars a group of fictional androids who are members of a covert black ops program code named Project Livewire. These androids are on a mission to seek out and destroy other black ops.

== Characters ==
- Cornfed looks like a big farm boy and seems to be the team's muscle, but he is actually in charge of all mechanical repairs. He can usually be found behind the scenes giving support and coordinating the team's missions.
- Gothic Lolita is the actual muscle even though she does not look the part. Social Butterfly used the term "Ben Grimm in black babydoll lace" to describe Gothic Lolita. Her code-name and look are both in reference to the Gothic Lolita fashion style popular in Japan. Gothic Lolita herself has described her role as "smashing and bashing duty."
- Hollowpoint Ninja is the team's infiltration agent. His description of his role is short but to the point: "stealth, weapons, ambushes."
- Homebrew was the team's tech specialist before Stem Cell. He was killed just before the beginning of Livewires #1.
- David Jenkins is the main supporting character. Throughout the series, Stem Cell is educated in her abilities by her teammates through the use of their memory archives. Jenkins is featured in most of these. Apart from being the main person behind the construction and programming of Project Livewire's androids, Jenkins is also shown to be chiefly responsible for their education and training. He was a kind of father figure to them.
- Social Butterfly's role is to extract information from individuals. She uses a variety of means to achieve this purpose. These include micromanagement of her facial expressions and body language, subliminal vocal clues, artificial pheromones, and force field-induced direct brain manipulation.
- Stem Cell is the tech specialist. She has a nanofactory where a human stomach would be. She uses this to quickly manufacture any technology that her teammates might need.

== Plot synopsis ==
=== Backstory ===
Project Livewire was founded by S.H.I.E.L.D. as a means of testing the next generation of S.H.I.E.L.D. androids. These androids are based on the long-standing S.H.I.E.L.D. android, the Life Model Decoys (LMDs), and the LMD successors, the Mannites. The androids of Project Livewire combine the super-human abilities of the Mannites with the human appearance of the LMDs. Most of the work for Project Livewire was done by David Jenkins, the assistant chief designer of the project.

In total, ten androids were created for Project Livewire. By the beginning of the limited series, there were only five left functioning.

=== Issue one: "See These Eyes So Red" ===
The series opens in the middle of a mission with Stem Cell's activation as a replacement for Homebrew. The team has located one of their targets at a facility operated by a company named Thermogentech. The rogue Black Op is using cells secretly taken from the original Human Torch. These cells have been used to create a hive race of giant burning nanomachine-based robots called Pyronanos. The Pyronanos have gone rogue and have taken over the Thermogentech lab where they were created. Project Livewire assaults the building and discovers the Pyronanos attempting to build a nuclear fusion cannon to spread themselves across the land. After a long fire-fight, the members of Project Livewire manage to destroy both the facility and the Pyronanos.

Since Stem Cell is straight "out of the box", she still has her default human emotional responses in place and has difficulty adapting to the experiences.

=== Issue two: "Clockwork Thugs, Yo" ===
After escaping the site of their battle in Issue 1, the team uses a plasma grenade to destroy Homebrew's remains, buries them, and then proceeds to their next two missions.

The first of these missions is the intimidation of a rogue AIM scientist. The second mission is carried out solo by Gothic Lolita. To succeed in her mission she has to steal an experimental Sentinel antimatter power core that is being transported aboard a civilian cargo plane.

=== Issue three: "Mammalian Verisimilitude" ===
The team infiltrates a night club that is the evening hang-out of a research scientist who is a known employee for one of their targeted black ops. Inside, Social Butterfly dances with the scientist and while doing so, uses her abilities to get his security codes. Meanwhile, Hollowpoint Ninja distracts the scientist's robotic bodyguard and makes sure it records nothing out of the ordinary.

Using the codes, Cornfed sabotages the black op's computers and in the process uncovers information that indicates a location where they could gain access to the highest priority target on their list. This target is a black op so secret that even its true code-name is unknown. It is known only by the nickname The White Whale.

=== Issues four to six: Battle With The White Whale ===
The team stows aboard a tanker truck containing a shipment of inert nanofluid that is being delivered to the White Whale by AIM. At the arrival point, a huge black robot appears and takes the entire tanker up to the White Whale's headquarters. The headquarters is revealed to be a massive flying structure that was built around the frame of an "officially wrecked" S.H.I.E.L.D. Helicarrier. The White Whale itself is revealed later to be a hive mind made up of modified Nick Fury-based LMD's.

Once aboard, the White Whale discovers their existence very quickly, and the team's plans begin to fall apart. In the resulting turmoil there is a scramble to find safety as their enemies open fire. Team members begin to drop at this point. One of the huge outer guns is turned inward to shoot at the area of the fire-fight. Cornfed is hit and the blast disintegrates most of his body; his head and right shoulder are the only parts left intact. Gothic Lolita is caught by one of the White Whale LMD's and thrown into the Helicarrier's electromagnetic launcher. The launcher is designed to put a 10-ton payload into orbit, but Gothic Lolita is launched down instead of up. The impact is enough to cause a significant explosion. The last member to fall is Social Butterfly. She is cut to pieces by one of their foes using a high-tech monowire whip. Hollowpoint Ninja is captured shortly after pushing Stem Cell into the relative safety of a fuel pipe. Stem Cell is then forced to hack herself so that she can alter her emotions at will.

The battle ends when Stem Cell uses plans stolen from Thermogentech's files to create an upgraded version of the Pyronanos. Stem Cell designs these Pyronanos to run even hotter than the originals; she plans for the resulting explosion to destroy the Helicarrier. Lost in the resulting fight between the Pyronanos and the White Whale, Stem Cell recovers the remains of Cornfed and Social Butterfly. She then rescues Hollowpoint Ninja, who had lost one arm and both legs in the meantime, and launches an escape pod. Fleeing to safety, the two survivors watch as the Helicarrier explodes behind them.

=== Final pages of issue six: The Aftermath ===
After reaching the ground, Stem Cell recovers the fused remains of Gothic Lolita and sets out for Project Livewire's headquarters with what is left of her teammates. Instead of the high tech building she is expecting, she finds a huge hole and demands Hollowpoint Ninja tell her what happened. He then shares a memory archive showing the events that took place when Project Livewire's mission orders were activated.

Unknown to the other members of the Project, David Jenkins had a hidden agenda. He predicted that the robot's programmed machine logic would lead them to the conclusion that humans were likely to compromise the Project and that they would believe it to be within mission parameters to kill everyone else in the Project. Jenkins adapted their mission so that it would lead to the destruction of other black projects funded by the US government from a list he made himself. His reasoning for all of this was 'The sociopaths in suits can't be trusted.' Using the base's gamma reactor and more personal means, the robotic members killed all the human members of Project Livewire. Jenkins was voluntarily included in this killing. Before his death, he asked them to give his glasses to one of their own; they gave them to Stem Cell.

The series ends with Stem Cell trying to decide on a new name as she sets out to find a place to rebuild her teammates.

== Publication history ==
Livewires #1-6 were published February - August 2005. A "digest format" trade paperback titled Livewires: Clockwork Thugs, Yo was published on October 10 of the same year. ISBN 0-7851-1519-6
