= Adam Warren (comics) =

American comic book writer and artist

- Born: 1967 (age 58–59) New Hampshire, United States
- Areas: Writer, Artist
- Notable works: The Dirty Pair; Empowered

Adam Warren (born 1967) is an American comic book writer and artist who is most famous for his original graphic novel Empowered, for adapting the characters known as Dirty Pair into an American comic book, and for being one of the first American commercial illustrators to be influenced by the general manga style. He has also contributed to several Gen^{13} comics, worked as writer and character designer for the Marvel Comics series Livewires, and done numerous freelance works. His current project is Empowered, which he has been working on continuously since 2007.

== Early life ==
Adam Warren was born in New Hampshire. He began attending The Kubert School in Dover, New Jersey in 1985, but was unsure about his future in comics after less than a year of attendance. Over the Christmas break of his first year, he chanced upon manga and anime, some of which was the original Dirty Pair, and this renewed his drive to become an artist.

== Career ==
After graduating from the Kubert School, Warren spent a year attempting to acquire the rights to produce a comic based on the Dirty Pair. He was finally able to make inroads with the help of Toren Smith and Studio Proteus, who had connections in Japan. Warren put together a portfolio of Dirty Pair–related work which Smith then took to Sunrise Studios, but they were unimpressed with the work and negotiations went nowhere. Smith then contacted Takachiho Haruka, the creator of the Dirty Pair, directly. Haruka was much more impressed with Warren's art and Smith's ideas and agreed to license the characters for an American comic. This directly resulted in Warren's first major work, Dirty Pair: Biohazards, which he co-wrote with Smith and published through Studio Proteus and Eclipse Comics in 1989. The next two Dirty Pair works would be co-written with Smith and released by Eclipse Comics. Starting with the fourth book, Sim Hell, it became a solo project and was released by Dark Horse Comics.

Throughout the '90s and into the 2000s Warren produced several Dirty Pair comics and trade paperbacks, a four-part Bubblegum Crisis series called Grand Mal as well as cover, pin-up and other "freelance" art. During this time he provided numerous cover illustrations, most notably covers for the X-Men, Star Wars, Fantastic Four (while he was also penning a few stories), and Appleseed series, as well as some trading card art, and even in-house Christmas cards for Studio Proteus. Between Dirty Pair works he also penned a three-part Terminator series called Hunters and Killers in 1992. Towards the end of the '90s and into the early 2000s he was one of the main writers, and to a lesser extent artist, for the Gen^{13} series from Wildstorm comics. He has done art commission work for Spin Magazine and PSM magazine. His PlayStation comics usually relate to their major featured article and are found on the back page of the magazine. His art has also been featured in their swimsuit edition. He has also been known to do some translation and scripting work, Seraphic Feather and Cannon God Exaxxion being two of the only known credited examples.

Warren's latest completed works are Livewires and Iron Man: Hypervelocity. Although Warren had promised several times in the past to continue work with the Lovely Angels, it has been several years since his last major Dirty Pair work. To date at least two planned DP related series have failed to come to market; the first a side-story meant to follow the character Shasti and the second a DP/Superman cross-over. Warren also created several pictures based on the video game SSX 3 of the SSX series.

Warren's latest work, which he is both writing and drawing, is a series of original graphic novels called Empowered. He describes the series as "an episodic 'sexy superhero comedy', mixing a twisted take on costumed crime-fighting, romance, and absurdist workplace humor with a strong dose of that 'manga flava'... and just a dash of the kinky." The first trade paper back was published by Dark Horse Comics in March 2007 after a slight delay, Volume Two was released in September 2007, Volume Three in March 2008 and Volume Four was released towards the end of October 2008 after a delay of about a month or so. Volume Five was released in late June 2009. Volume Six was released on September 21, 2010. The series is neither inked nor colored, but rather sourced directly from pencil drawings.

== Drawing style ==
Warren makes very tight pencil layouts of the pages before they are inked, toned and colored. According to Warren himself, everyone who saw the layouts said, to his chagrin, that they liked them better than the final colored pages. On Empowered he tried a new style, the pages are greyscale reproductions of pencil "layouts", and are neither inked nor toned. The layouts that he uses are cleaner and more tightened versions of his layouts for previous works.

This pencil layout style is also seen on several of his Dirty Pair short stories, and in a pair of pages of Gen13 Magical Drama Queen Roxy, a Gen^{13} miniseries, where one of the characters starts a deconstructing/poststructuralist device that deconstructs the comic through all the stages of production: color, color guides, inked page, tight pencil layout, rough pencil layout and script.

== Notes ==
Preceded by Karl Kesel	Fantastic Four writer 2002	Succeeded by Mark Waid
