= Jared Hedges =

American screenwriter

Jared Hedges is a writer/producer for television and video games. He was born in 1980 in Dallas, Texas, and majored in screenwriting at the University of Southern California. Most of his work has consisted of English adaptation (a.k.a. ADR) scripts for anime series. He has written for FUNimation since 1999, working as Head Writer on shows including Fullmetal Alchemist, Samurai 7, Speed Grapher, Tsukuyomi -Moon Phase-, Yu Yu Hakusho, and Tsubasa Chronicle. He has worked smaller stints on Dragon Ball Z, Dragon Ball, Negima, Case Closed, and Darker Than Black.

Jared's writing team has included Joel Bergen, Kelli Howard, Alex Muniz, Colleen Clinkenbeard, Bonny Clinkenbeard, Ben Arntz, Michael Ampikapon, Michael B. Steinberg, Laura Moran, and Joelle Sellner.

Other adaptation work includes the feature-length anime Fullmetal Alchemist the Movie: Conqueror of Shamballa, and Dragon Ball: The Path to Power.

In 2006, Jared, Joel Bergen and Alex Muniz began writing the English scripts of the anime comedy Shin Chan, which had a six episode trial run on Adult Swim in the summer of 2006. The first season (episodes 1-20) began airing on Adult Swim April 9, 2007. After a long hiatus, the last six episodes of season one (episodes 21-26) began airing December 10, 2007. Season 2 (episodes 27-52) began airing on April 12, 2008, with writers Michael B. Steinberg, Ben Arntz, Laura Moran, and Joelle Sellner added to the writing team.

Jared appeared at Comic Con 2007 in San Diego and New York Comic Con 2008, promoting Shin Chan.

Jared was the script writer for the game Stuntman: Ignition, by developers THQ/Paradigm Entertainment, which released August 28, 2007. He also wrote English localization scripts for the games Fullmetal Alchemist 2: Curse of the Crimson Elixir, Fullmetal Alchemist: Duel Sympathy, and No More Heroes 2: Desperate Struggle.

Jared has also produced special-feature vignettes for DVD extras, promotional materials, and television shows on the Funimation Channel. This includes The Real Rockstar Dad: Interviews with Gene Simmons, Case Closed 101, the 30 minute documentary Goku vs. Vegeta, and the Otakon 2006 episode of Anime Road Rage.

More recently, he was enlisted as the head writer of the English dub for Sgt. Frog.

== Awards ==
- 2006 Dubbie Award, Writer of the Year. (animeondvd.com)
- 2008 Shin Chan named "Best Dub" by Anime Insider Magazine, annual "Best of the Best" Awards.
- 2008 Shin Chan named "Best Series on TV" by Anime Insider Magazine, annual "Best of the Best" Awards.
