= How to Draw Manga =

Series of instructional books

The cover of How to Draw Manga: Bodies & Anatomy

How to Draw Manga (Japanese: マンガの描き方) is a series of instructional books on drawing manga published by Graphic-sha and written by a variety of authors. Originally in Japanese for the Japanese market, many volumes have been translated into English and published in the United States. The English-language volumes in the series were co-produced by Graphic-sha and two other Japanese companies: Japanime Co. Ltd. and Japan Publications Trading Co.

== List of books in the series ==
This is a list of books in the main HTDM set and other sets that relate to the main series.

=== How to Draw Manga ===
Originally there were no volume numbers on the English versions, because the original Japanese version did not have them. Only volumes one through eight were given numbers. With continued reprints and more books being released, all volumes gained a number. The dates given are the first printing.

- How to Draw Manga Vol. 1: Compiling Characters (October 1999)
- How to Draw Manga Vol. 2: Compiling Techniques (July 2000)
- How to Draw Manga Vol. 3: Compiling Application and Practice (August 2000)
- How to Draw Manga Vol. 4: Dressing Your Characters in Casual Wear (May 2001)
- How to Draw Manga Vol. 5: Developing Shoujo Manga Techniques (July 2002)
- How to Draw Manga Vol. 6: Martial Arts & Combat Sports (June 2002)
- How to Draw Manga Vol. 7: Amazing Effects (June 2003)
- How to Draw Manga Vol. 8: Super Basics (June 2003)
- How to Draw Manga Vol. 9: Special: Colored Original Drawing (May 2001)
- How to Draw Manga Vol. 10: Getting Started (October 2000)
- How to Draw Manga Vol. 11: Maids & Miko (November 2002)
- How to Draw Manga Vol. 12: Giant Robots (February 2002)
- How to Draw Manga Vol. 13: Super Tone Techniques (August 2002)
- How to Draw Manga Vol. 14: Colorful Costumes (January 2003)
- How to Draw Manga Vol. 15: Girls' Life Illustration File (May 2003)
- How to Draw Manga Vol. 16: Guns & Military Vol. 1 (September 2003)
- How to Draw Manga Vol. 17: Guns & Military Vol. 2 (October 2004)
- How to Draw Manga Vol. 18: Super-Deformed Characters Vol. 1 Humans (August 2004)
- How to Draw Manga Vol. 19: Super-Deformed Characters Vol. 2 Animals (June 2005)
- How to Draw Manga Vol. 20: Female Characters (December 1999)
- How to Draw Manga Vol. 21: Bishoujo Pretty Gals (November 2000)
- How to Draw Manga Vol. 22: Bishoujo Around the World (March 2001)
- How to Draw Manga Vol. 23: Illustrating Battles (October 2000)
- How to Draw Manga Vol. 24: Occult & Horror (June 2003)
- How to Draw Manga Vol. 25: Bodies & Anatomy (December 2001)
- How to Draw Manga Vol. 26: Making Anime (January 2003)
- How to Draw Manga Vol. 27: Male Characters (July 2002)
- How to Draw Manga Vol. 28: Couples (January 2003)
- How to Draw Manga Vol. 29: Putting Things in Perspective (October 2002)
- How to Draw Manga Vol. 30: Pen & Tone Techniques (April 2003)
- How to Draw Manga Vol. 31: More about Pretty Gals (August 2003)
- How to Draw Manga Vol. 32: Mech. Drawing (December 2003)
- How to Draw Manga Vol. 33: Costume Encyclopedia Vol. 1 Everyday Fashion (December 2003)
- How to Draw Manga Vol. 34: Costume Encyclopedia Vol. 2 Intimate Apparel (January 2005)
- How to Draw Manga Vol. 35: Costume Encyclopedia Vol. 3: Sexy Sports Wear (May 2005)
- How to Draw Manga Vol. 36: Animals (February 2005)
- How to Draw Manga Vol. 37: Macromedia Flash Techniques (February 2004)
- How to Draw Manga Vol. 38: Ninja & Samurai Portrayal (September 2005)
- How to Draw Manga Vol. 39: Creating Manga: Stories (April 2007)
- How to Draw Manga Vol. 40: Dressing Your Characters In Suits & Sailor Suits (August 2006)
- How to Draw Manga Vol. 41: Costume Encyclopedia Vol. 4 Kimono & Gowns (April 2007)
- How to Draw Manga Vol. 42: Drawing Yaoi (June 2007) Note: this is a bishōnen how-to guide, not yaoi
- How to Draw Manga Vol. 43: Drawing Bishōnen (December 2008)

=== How to Draw Manga: Ultimate Manga Lessons ===
This set was printed in a smaller format of 15 cm x 21 cm.

- How to Draw Manga: Ultimate Manga Lessons Vol. 1: Drawing Made Easy (April 2005)
- How to Draw Manga: Ultimate Manga Lessons Vol. 2: The Basics of Characters and Materials (August 2005)
- How to Draw Manga: Ultimate Manga Lessons Vol. 3: Drawing Sensational Characters (November 2005)
- How to Draw Manga: Ultimate Manga Lessons Vol. 4: Making the Characters Come Alive (March 2006)
- How to Draw Manga: Ultimate Manga Lessons Vol. 5: A Touch of Dynamism (2006)
- How to Draw Manga: Ultimate Manga Lessons Vol. 6: Striking the Right Note (2006)

=== How to Draw Manga: Computones ===
Each volume in this set includes a CD-ROM for use with Windows only.

- How to Draw Manga: Computones Vol. 1: Basic Tone Techniques (May 2005)
- How to Draw Manga: Computones Vol. 2: Depicting Characters (September 2005)
- How to Draw Manga: Computones Vol. 3: Mecha (October 2005)
- How to Draw Manga: Computones Vol. 4: Portraying Couples (June 2006)
- How to Draw Manga: Computones Vol. 5: Aiming For Action (June 2006)

=== How to Draw Manga: Sketching Manga-Style ===
- How to Draw Manga: Sketching Manga-Style Vol. 1: Sketching to Plan (February 2007)
- How to Draw Manga: Sketching Manga-Style Vol. 2: Logical Proportions (April 2007)
- How to Draw Manga: Sketching Manga-Style Vol. 3: Unforgettable Characters (October 2007)
- How to Draw Manga: Sketching Manga-Style Vol. 4: All About Perspective (November 12, 2008)
- How to Draw Manga: Sketching Manga-Style Vol. 5: Sketching Props (August 11, 2009)

These books are no longer in print and the series has been canceled.

=== Manga Pose Resource Book ===
This set was printed in an over-sized format of 21 cm x 29.6 cm.

- Manga Pose Resource Book Vol. 1: Basic Poses (2002)
- Manga Pose Resource Book Vol. 2: Animals (2002)
- Manga Pose Resource Book Vol. 3: Actions Scenes (2002)

=== How to Draw Anime and Game Characters ===
This set is another Graphic-Sha publication that is shown alongside the main HTDM series on the dustjacks and in ads.

- How to Draw Anime and Game Characters Vol. 1: Basics for Beginners and Beyond (August 2000)
- How to Draw Anime and Game Characters Vol. 2: Expressing Emotions (March 2001)
- How to Draw Anime and Game Characters Vol. 3: Bringing Daily Actions to Life (August 2001)
- How to Draw Anime and Game Characters Vol. 4: Mastering Battle and Action Moves (April 2002)
- How to Draw Anime and Game Characters Vol. 5: Bishoujo Game Characters (September 2003)

=== More How to Draw Manga ===
Another set of manga-know-how with only four volumes, based in character creation.

- More How to Draw Manga Vol. 1: The Basics of Character Drawing (March 2004)
- More How to Draw Manga Vol. 2: Penning Characters (March 2004)
- More How to Draw Manga Vol. 3: Enhancing a Character's Sense of Presence (August 2004)
- More How to Draw Manga Vol. 4: Mastering Bishoujo Characters (September 2004)

=== Canceled/status unknown volumes ===
These are volumes that were going to be released in English and even advertised for ordering, but they have been cancelled.

- How to Draw Manga: Digital Comic Guide Vol. 1

== Cross-promotions ==
A special edition of the series titled How to Draw Manga Special: Colored Original Drawing was produced detailing how to use Copic markers. It explains how to avoid blotches, use colorless blenders, select paper, refill markers, changing nibs and the airbrush system. It is Volume 9 in the English language series.

== Reception ==
The series has been credited with "the standardization of manga style", popularizing most common tropes such as "the large eyes of shōjo characters, the feminine features of bishōnen". The series has been successful in multiple markets as it has been translated into numerous other languages, and it shows the global success of manga: that not only the product itself is successful, but even works about the process of making the product.
