= Johji Manabe =

Japanese manga artist

- Occupation: Manga artist
- Years active: 1985-present
- Notable work: Outlanders; Caravan Kidd; Capricorn

Johji Manabe (真鍋譲治, Manabe Jōji), also known as George Manabe, is a Japanese manga artist.

He is best known in the English-speaking world for Caravan Kidd, Outlanders, and Capricorn.

He is not to be confused with an animator of the same name (but written differently; 真鍋譲二) who worked mainly in the 1970s for Oh! Production, contributing to such works as A Dog of Flanders, Genshi Shōnen Ryû, 3000 Leagues in Search of Mother, Dokonjō Gaeru, King Arthur, Galaxy Express 999, Lupin the 3rd: Season 1, Lupin the 3rd: The Castle of Cagliostro, Future Boy Conan (episodes 8–17), and others.

== Works ==
Listed chronologically.

- Outlanders (8 volumes, 1985–1987, Hakusensha)
- Caravan Kidd (5 volumes, 1986–1989, Shogakukan)
  - The Key of Graciale (1 volume, April 1987, ISBN 4-592-13107-X, Hakusensha)
- Powerful Mazegohan (3 volumes, 1986–1989, Hakusensha)
- Dora (1 volume, December 1987, ISBN 4-403-61148-6, Shinshokan)
- Capricorn (5 volumes, 1988–1990, Shinshokan)
- Sorcerian: Ten no Kamigami-tachi (volume 6 in the Sorcerian manga series, September 1989, ISBN 4-04-926015-8, Kadokawa Shoten)
- Banpanera (1 volume, February 1991, ISBN 4-8291-8311-X, Fujimi Shobo)
- Junk Party (1 volume, November 1991, ISBN 4-04-926030-1, Kadokawa Shoten)
- Russian Clash (1 volume, April 1992, ISBN 4-8291-8321-7, Fujimi Shobo)
- Dotō! Jamuka no Daibōken (5 volumes, July 1992 – August 1994, Shinshokan)
- Ginga Sengoku Gun'yūden Rai (27 volumes, September 1993 – December 2001, Media Works)
  - Ginga Sengoku Gun'yūden Rai: Ibun (1 volume, 10 April 2004, ISBN 4-8402-2562-1, Media Works)
- Viva Usagi-gozō (5 volumes, November 1993 – December 1995, Gakken)
- Chūka Ichiban (1 volume, December 1993, ISBN 4-04-712029-4, Kadokawa Shoten)
- Gosei Dōji Ran (2 volumes, August 1995 – September 1996, Kobunsha)
- Drakuun: Dragon Princess Army (5 volumes, 1995–2003, Kadokawa Shoten)
- Budō Shōsa Powerful China (1 volume, December 1996, ISBN 4-19-830158-1, Tokuma Shoten)
- Wild Kingdom (5 volumes, December 2000 – February 2003, Enterbrain)
- Kurobone (1 volume, 10 October 2003, ISBN 4-8402-2475-7, Media Works)
- Ogin (1 volume, 17 March 2005, ISBN 4-7767-9140-4, Ohzora Publishing)
- Oniku ni Chu (1 volume, 17 August 2005, ISBN 4-8124-6227-4, Takeshobo)
- Makunouchi Deluxe (3 volumes, 8 May 2006 – October 2007, Takeshobo)
- Tail Chaser (3 volumes, 25 August 2006 – 25 December 2007, Fujimi Shuppan)
- Ring × Mama (5 volumes, 27 August 2008 – 29 August 2011, Takeshobo, ISBN 978-4-8124-6868-5 / ISBN 978-4-8124-7060-2 / ISBN 978-4-8124-7226-2 / ISBN 978-4-8124-7465-5 / ISBN 978-4-8124-7658-1)
- Koisuru Ushi-chichi (2 volumes, 2009–2010, Fujimi Shuppan)
- Kanojo de Ippai (3 volumes, 2010–2012, ISBN 978-4-8322-3222-8 / ISBN 978-4-8322-3238-9 / ISBN 978-4-8322-3264-8, Houbunsha)
- Johji Manabe Presents: Maina Kishin Sōki (1 volume, Gakken)
- Rise of the Outlaw Tamer (4 volumes, 2021- )
