= Empowered (comics) =

American manga comic by Adam Warren

- Cover of Empowered vol. 1 (2007), trade paperback collected edition, art by Adam Warren
- Genre: Superhero
- Author: Adam Warren
- Publisher: Dark Horse Comics (U.S. and U.K.)
- Original run: 2007 – present
- Volumes: 12

Empowered is an original English-language manga style comic written and illustrated by Adam Warren.

== Creation ==
Described by Warren as a "sexy superhero comedy", Empowered began to take shape in 2004 with a series of commissioned sketches of a damsel in distress; these illustrations became the basis for short comic stories that helped develop the characters for the series.

Warren says that Empowered is "nominally a superhero title, yet it's drawn by a clearly manga-influenced artist". The pages are greyscale reproductions of pencil "layouts", and they are neither inked nor toned (as in the screentones common in manga).

== Plot ==
Empowered chronicles the story of the titular character, a superheroine whose civilian name is Elissa Megan Powers, but is more commonly referred to as "Emp" (originally after her initials, E.M.P.). The series is set in an unnamed city on the West Coast of the United States. Similar in respects to fictional cities such as DC Comics' Metropolis or Gotham City, the City is nearly constantly beset by a plethora of super-powered and non-powered villains who largely are never shown to have any goals beyond causing chaos.

Empowered is a young blonde woman who is highly self-conscious about her figure, and has other self-esteem issues. She was inspired to become a superhero and help others after witnessing the death of her father at a very early age, going so far as to get a degree in "Metahuman Studies" while attending an unnamed college. She obtains a unique "hypermembrane" supersuit through unknown means but the suit is both very revealing and unreliable. Her concern over her appearance frequently serves as a dominant aspect of her career as a superheroine, as her "hypermembrane" supersuit is composed of an extremely fragile material; a material so thin and clingy that it outlines every curve of her body. Additionally, while her suit can provide her with several fantastic powers, such as super strength and directed energy blasts, these enhancements will usually fail if her suit becomes too damaged. Due to the fragility of her suit, this has happened frequently, and thus, she has earned herself a reputation for being ineffective and easily defeated. Despite these many limitations, Empowered still manages to triumph in both her personal and professional lives using her intellect and determination, even if she rarely gains accolades for said heroic acts from the public at large.

She is also an associate-level member of the Superhomeys superhero group, who are the primary defenders of the city in which they reside. Within the group, Empowered is an active participant in many of the battles against the multitude of villains that threaten the metropolis. However, because of the unreliability of her suit, she is commonly defeated and captured. And, because of the villains' unwillingness to violate the unspoken rules of superhero/supervillain interaction, she is frequently hogtied and left for the Superhomeys to eventually rescue. Due to the frequency of this, she has a reputation within the Superhomeys as being "bondage-prone" and is something of a laughingstock. Empowered continually fights alongside them despite their lack of respect toward her and her own suit's unreliable nature, due to her unwavering determination to help people as best as she is able. While her teammates often soundly dismiss her contributions, she has managed to save the lives of the Superhomeys singlehandedly on at least two occasions. Empowered is also portrayed as being more morally upstanding, idealistic and noble than the majority of her more powerful, cynical teammates and members of the superhuman community at large.

Although Empowered is continually subjected to humiliation in her career as a superheroine, she does have close companionship and emotional support from her boyfriend, who is only known as Thugboy. Thugboy - so called due to his previous career as a thug and henchman to various supervillains - reforms to stand by Empowered's side after meeting her "on the job" and moves in with her in short order. He continually provides her with uplifting emotional support and encouragement despite her misadventures and nigh-on continual failure to live up to her own expectations. This love and support frequently manifests in the form of sex, which may be beneficial to Empowered's hypermembrane as well as her emotional state since the former seems to mirror the latter.

Emp is also a close friend to a young woman named Kozue Kaburagi, who prefers to be called by the pseudonym "Ninjette". Ninjette (or simply "'Jette", as she is colloquially known) is a highly trained ninja and runaway princess of the Kaburagi ninja clan, which is based out of New Jersey. She, too, met Empowered on the opposite side of the law but has since reformed, thanks to forming a close friendship with the idealistic Empowered. She has been shown to have both a drinking problem and an unresolved attraction to Thugboy but neither of these problems have ruined their close friendship yet.

Her rival in most respects is respected fellow SuperHomey Sistah Spooky, a powerful, goth-styled black sorceress. She is very resentful of Emp and hugely successful. As a child, Spooky attended a private school full of "shallow, preppy bitches" with icy glares and flowing blond hair. She was so scarred by this that she developed a lifelong pathological hatred of beautiful blond women, and attempted to contact eldritch magickal entities in order to murder them, only to find out that her peers were already the clients of those same entities, as part of a package to sell your soul to be perfectly hot for the rest of your life. She eventually bought the package herself, but was accidentally given an excess of mystical power, which she used to become a superhero and achieve international fame. Emp, who already has blond hair and shares characteristics with the girls from Spooky's past, is shown to be a constant target of her hatred. Additionally, Spooky's prejudice caused extreme tension in her lesbian relationship with the blonde telepath Mindfuck, eventually leading to them breaking up.

The final member of Empowered's primary supporting cast is an immortal, cosmically powerful being called The Caged Demonwolf, whom Empowered prevented from destroying the Earth by imprisoning its essence within a "bondage belt" gained from another of her previous misadventures. When the Superhomeys refused to take the now sentient and enraged belt into storage, Empowered was forced to hold on to it, much to her chagrin. While The Caged Demonwolf was initially hostile, it has since become both an advisor and friend to Empowered, Thugboy and Ninjette. The Caged Demonwolf also has a humorously unfortunate tendency to speak only in turgid, long-winded, and unnecessarily alliterative speeches, which often obscure the points it is attempting to make. It also breaks the fourth wall to address the audience directly on occasion. To keep it entertained, Emp has placed The Caged Demonwolf on her living room coffee table so it can watch TV, listen to sports talk radio, and generally interact with the comings and goings of Emp's household.

A running gag in the strip is the promise to show people things that never get delivered along with some of the things that do, such as why Emp's suit doesn't show camel toe and the appearance of "Were-giraffe by Night".

== Publishing history ==
The following volumes have been released as Trade Paperbacks by Dark Horse:

Title	Release date	ISBN
empowered Vol. 1	March 21, 2007	ISBN 978-1-59307-672-6
empowered Vol. 2	October 3, 2007	ISBN 978-1-59307-816-4
empowered Vol. 3	March 5, 2008	ISBN 978-1-59307-870-6
empowered Vol. 4	October 29, 2008	ISBN 978-1-59307-994-9
empowered Vol. 5	June 24, 2009	ISBN 978-1-59582-212-3
empowered Vol. 6	Sep 8, 2010	ISBN 978-1-59582-391-5
empowered Vol. 7	May 30, 2012	ISBN 978-1-59582-884-2
empowered Vol. 8	December 18, 2013	ISBN 978-1-61655-204-6
empowered Vol. 9	August 19, 2015	ISBN 978-1-61655-571-9
empowered Vol. 10	June 21, 2017	ISBN 978-1-5067-0414-2
empowered Vol. 11	September 18, 2019	ISBN 978-1-5067-1499-8
empowered Vol. 12	December 3, 2024	ISBN 978-1-5067-3106-3

The first nine volumes have also been collected in hardcover editions:

Title	Release date	ISBN
empowered Vol. 1 Deluxe Edition collecting volumes 1 – 3	February 29, 2012	ISBN 978-1-59582-864-4
empowered Vol. 2 Deluxe Edition collecting volumes 4 – 6	August 29, 2012	ISBN 978-1-59582-865-1
empowered Vol. 3 Deluxe Edition collecting volumes 7 – 9	September 13, 2017	ISBN 978-1-5067-0452-4

A comic book titled empowered Special: The Wench With a Million Sighs was released in 2009 and is the first empowered book in a traditional comic book format. These specials have continued, appearing sporadically. Starting with the second comic, the specials have included art by other artists, generally in color, though special #5 is entirely in black and white, with the guest artist's pages being inked rather than shot straight from the pencils as Adam Warren's are.

The empowered Specials are:

Title	Release date	Artist(s)
empowered Special #1: The Wench with a Million Sighs	December 2, 2009	Adam Warren
empowered Special #2: Ten Questions for the Maidman	June 8, 2011	Adam Warren (B/W pages) Emily Warren (Color pages)
empowered Special #3: Hell Bent or Heaven Sent	December 19, 2012	Adam Warren (B/W pages) Ryan Kinnaird (Color pages)
empowered Special #4: Animal Style	June 5, 2013	Adam Warren (B/W pages) John Staton with Guru EFX (Colour pages)
empowered Special #5: Nine Beers with Ninjette	September 25, 2013	Adam Warren (Prologue) Takeshi Miyazawa (Main story)
empowered Special #6: Internal Medicine	March 26, 2014	Adam Warren (B/W pages) Brandon Graham (Color pages)
empowered Special #7: Pew Pew Pew!	November 25, 2015	Adam Warren
empowered Special #8: ...and the Soldier of Love #1	February 8, 2017	Karla Diaz
empowered Special #8: ...and the Soldier of Love #2	March 22, 2017	Karla Diaz
empowered Special #8: ...and the Soldier of Love #3	May 3, 2017	Karla Diaz
empowered Special #9: ...and Sistah Spooky's Highschool Hell #1	Dec 20, 2017	Carla Speed McNeil (Artist) Jenn Manley Lee (Colourist)
empowered Special #9: ...and Sistah Spooky's Highschool Hell #2	Jan 24, 2018	Carla Speed McNeil (Artist) Jenn Manley Lee (Colourist)
empowered Special #9: ...and Sistah Spooky's Highschool Hell #3	Feb 21, 2018	Carla Speed McNeil (Artist) Jenn Manley Lee (Colourist)
empowered Special #9: ...and Sistah Spooky's Highschool Hell #4	Apr 18, 2018	Carla Speed McNeil (Artist) Jenn Manley Lee (Colourist)
empowered Special #9: ...and Sistah Spooky's Highschool Hell #5	Jul 04, 2018	Carla Speed McNeil (Artist) Jenn Manley Lee (Colourist)
empowered Special #9: ...and Sistah Spooky's Highschool Hell #6	Oct 17, 2018	Carla Speed McNeil (Artist) Jenn Manley Lee (Colourist)

The first six Specials have been collected into a trade paperback "empowered Unchained Volume 1", and Specials #7 and #8 into "empowered and the Soldier of Love": Special #9 has been collected into a trade paperback called "empowered and Sistah Spooky's Highschool Hell".

Title	Release date	ISBN
empowered Unchained Volume 1	April 1, 2015	ISBN 978-1-61655-580-1
empowered and the Soldier of Love	June 27, 2018	ISBN 978-1-5067-0703-7
empowered and Sistah Spooky's Highschool Hell	January 23, 2019	ISBN 978-1-5067-0661-0

== Reception ==
Critical reception to the series has been mostly positive, with volumes of the series receiving positive reviews from Comic Book Resources, Pop Culture Shock, and Comics Alliance. Of volume 6, Comics Alliance said that "even in the middle of constant T&A, Warren's strong sense of humor and character shines through. Without it, "Empowered" 6 would be just another lame softcore comic, but the narrative, the characters, and the self-indulgent winks at the reader prop "Empowered" up as something more than your typical sexy superhero fare."

== Notes ==
- ^PULSEINTERVIEW Jennifer M. Contino (2007-03-23). "Adam Warren empowered with comic books". Pulse (comic book magazine). Archived from the original on 2007-06-20. "Well, for one thing, Empowered is nominally a superhero title, yet it's drawn by a clearly manga-influenced artist. (...) The unique thing about Empowered's artwork is that it's reproduced directly from my very, very tight penciled pages... (...) grayscale repro of this type is tricky, but can be highly rewarding, I've found. (...) In fact, Empowered's pages are just a tightened-up and cleaner version of how I've been doing my (notoriously tight) layouts for the last decade or so. Somewhat to my chagrin, almost everyone (or, at least, every artist) who's seen my so-called "layouts" has said that they like them better than my published, inked-and-toned/colored pages. (...) and roll with an extra-tight incarnation of my layout technique for this and other future work."
