= Ojarumaru series 5 =

Ojarumaru
- Series 5
- No. of episodes: 90

Release
- Original network: NHK
- Original release: April 1 – December 6, 2002

Series chronology
- ← Previous; Series 4 Next → Series 6

The fifth series of the Ojarumaru anime series aired from April 1 to December 6, 2002, on NHK for a total of 90 episodes.

The series' opening theme is "Utahito" (詠人) by Saburō Kitajima. The ending theme is "Acchi Muite Hoi de ojaru" (あっちむいてホイでおじゃる) by Yuriko Fuchizaki, Kazuya Ichijou, Rie Iwatsubo, Omi Minami, Chinami Nishimura, and Yūji Ueda.

The series was released on VHS by Nippon Crown across fifteen volumes, each containing 6 episodes, from October 25, 2002, to August 22, 2003. Nippon Crown later released the series on DVD across two compilation volumes, each containing 10 selected episodes, simultaneously on August 21, 2003. The first volume contains episodes 363, 365, 372, 375, 379, 382, 390, 399, 400, and 402. The second volume contains episodes 406, 409, 413, 422, 423, 435, 446, 447, 449, and 450.

== Episodes ==
No.	Title	Original release date
361	"N/A"	April 1, 2002
362	"Black Tea Mask"	April 2, 2002
363	"N/A"	April 3, 2002
364	"N/A"	April 4, 2002
365	"Oko-Niko Become Fortunetellers"	April 5, 2002
366	"Aka Murasaki Again"	April 8, 2002
367	"A Way to Get Back the Scepter"	April 9, 2002
368	"N/A"	April 10, 2002
369	"N/A"	April 11, 2002
370	"Viva! Unhappiness"	April 12, 2002
371	"Ojaru Disguises"	April 15, 2002
372	"Hifumi-chan Again"	April 16, 2002
373	"N/A"	April 17, 2002
374	"Ukkun is a Girl?!"	April 18, 2002
375	"Tsukkii Grafitied"	April 19, 2002
376	"N/A"	April 22, 2002
377	"Enma Becomes Denbo"	April 23, 2002
378	"Falling Out! The Tiny Things Club"	April 24, 2002
379	"Ojaru Quits Ojaru"	April 25, 2002
380	"Ai-chan, a Dream of ESP Livelihood"	April 26, 2002
381	"Grandma Marie Wants to Mark-Up the Rent"	April 29, 2002
382	"The Drawer isn't Opening"	April 30, 2002
383	"N/A"	May 1, 2002
384	"Ken and Usui Staring at Each Other"	May 2, 2002
385	"N/A"	May 3, 2002
386	"Denbo Crying for Onigiri"	May 6, 2002
387	"N/A"	May 7, 2002
388	"N/A"	May 8, 2002
389	"N/A"	May 9, 2002
390	"Asa-chan: The Morning of a Snowy Day"	May 10, 2002
391	"N/A"	May 13, 2002
392	"N/A"	May 14, 2002
393	"Bossy Kazuma"	May 15, 2002
394	"The Day of the Moonlight Town Disguise Contest"	May 16, 2002
395	"Kazuma Dislikes"	May 17, 2002
396	"Ojaru Likes the Oni Child Trio"	May 20, 2002
397	"N/A"	May 21, 2002
398	"Akane and Ai-chan"	May 22, 2002
399	"N/A"	May 23, 2002
400	"Rainy Day Puzzle"	May 24, 2002
401	"Hoshino Wants"	May 27, 2002
402	"Poverty-chan's Bath Day"	May 28, 2002
403	"Maeda Again"	May 29, 2002
404	"N/A"	May 30, 2002
405	"Ojaru is Eager"	May 31, 2002
406	"Ojaru-Word"	October 7, 2002
407	"Ken Doesn't Want to Fall"	October 8, 2002
408	"N/A"	October 9, 2002
409	"Maririn the Typhoon"	October 10, 2002
410	"Denbo Catches a Cold"	October 11, 2002
411	"The Ojaru Observation"	October 14, 2002
412	"N/A"	October 15, 2002
413	"Kisuke Mask"	October 16, 2002
414	"The Tiny Things Club Golf Tournament"	October 17, 2002
415	"Nedzu Again?"	October 18, 2002
416	"Kame-Tome Fight"	October 21, 2002
417	"Ojaru House"	October 22, 2002
418	"The Moonlight Town Round-table Discussion"	October 23, 2002
419	"Farewell, Warashi"	October 24, 2002
420	"Kazuma and Aobee"	October 25, 2002
421	"Katapi and Francois"	October 28, 2002
422	"Kazuma's Behind Face"	October 29, 2002
423	"Kanae"	October 30, 2002
424	"N/A"	October 31, 2002
425	"Nedzu Once Again?"	November 1, 2002
426	"Usui's Friend"	November 4, 2002
427	"The Coming Night of the Dancing Star"	November 5, 2002
428	"Makoto Goes to the Super"	November 6, 2002
429	"A Gift from a Obake"	November 7, 2002
430	"N/A"	November 8, 2002
431	"Mr. Shōshin's Major Incident"	November 11, 2002
432	"Denbo Misunderstanding"	November 12, 2002
433	"Giving Up Oko-Niko"	November 13, 2002
434	"N/A"	November 14, 2002
435	"N/A"	November 15, 2002
436	"Amaenbo Tommy"	November 18, 2002
437	"Yoshiko Tanaka's Dried Persimmons"	November 19, 2002
438	"Oja-Mansion and Townspeople"	November 20, 2002
439	"N/A"	November 21, 2002
440	"N/A"	November 22, 2002
441	"Ojaru Slackens Even More"	November 25, 2002
442	"Nedzu Runs"	November 26, 2002
443	"N/A"	November 27, 2002
444	"The Mechanical Music Doll"	November 28, 2002
445	"Kanae's Wish"	November 29, 2002
446	"Replaced"	December 2, 2002
447	"N/A"	3 December 2002
448	"Poverty-chan's Song"	4 December 2002
449	"Kanae and Hoshino"	5 December 2002
450	"N/A"	6 December 2002
