= List of Shadow Skill characters =

The Shadow Skill manga and anime series has a varied cast of characters originally created by Megumu Okada. The plot takes place in the fictional a warrior kingdom with a history stretching back over 2,000 years. The kingdom stands perpetually on the brink of war with its neighbors. Warriors of Kurda fight using martial arts styles that utilize magic-like powers and compete in colosseum matches to rise in rank and hone their skills; the highest of these ranks being Vaar and then Savaar.

== Protagonists ==
=== Elle Ragu ===
Elle Ragu (エレ・ラグ, Ere Ragu) is the 59th Sevaar of Kurda and one of the Four Divas. Though she is not the only female Sevaar in history – a title roughly equivalent to a "high warrior", as an ordinary warrior is known as a Vaar – she does hold the distinction of being the youngest female ever to be awarded the title of Sevaar, at age 14, 3 years prior to the start of the series. Her fighting nickname "Shadow Skill" is also the name of her martial arts style.

Elle has an older brother: Diaz Ragu, a blacksmith and a Vaar of Kurda. Their parents both died from a rampaging disease when Elle was still young, and she too contracted the same illness. Diaz immediately set out on many dangerous missions in order to raise the money needed for his sister's medicine. Elle was saved, but Diaz' body was severely weakened by his ordeal, to the point that he had to give up on being a warrior, instead devoting himself to crafting his Black Wing boomerangs. Elle continues to feel guilt for this fact to this day, believing it should have been him to win this title, and not her. She also has a reputation as both a heavy drinker and a brawler, often acting without considering the consequences. A running joke throughout the series is how deeply in debt she is, and how any windfalls of money she might come into, always immediately go into either paying off the damages to her surroundings, or else into debts accumulated for the same reason.

Voiced by: Megumi Hayashibara (Japanese); JoAnna MacInnes (OAV), Luci Christian (TV) (English)

=== Gau Ban ===
Gau Ban (ガウ・バン), also known as Black Howling, is a Vaar of Kurda and Elle Ragu's adopted brother.

His origins differ slightly between the OAV and anime. In the anime, Gau is ten when the attack occurs. Seeing his parents murdered in front of him, Gau snaps and attacks the bandits. He kills most of them, but then his luck runs out. Elle shows up before he himself is killed, and finishes off the remaining bandits. In the OAV, bandits attacked his home village when he was nine years old, slaughtering everyone, including Gau's parents. Over the next year, Gau exercised guerrilla-style attacks against the bandits for revenge. He eventually encounters Elle on the road by chance.

Since Gau is the only survivor of his village, Elle takes him with her. Originally, Gau only intended to follow Elle in order to steal all her money and discover the source of her powers. However, after some time, Gau came to care for Elle like an older sister. Over the years, Gau has trained side by side with Elle in an effort to become strong. With his dedication and signs of promise, he quickly catches the attention of the 57th Sevaar, Scarface, who decides to help Gau improve, albeit only indirectly. Many incidents that Gau encounters are in some way or another engineered by Scarface, for the purpose of driving him to improve and become stronger.

He also catches the love-interest of Kyuo Liu, however Gau is completely oblivious to her intentions. In an ironic turn of events, Scribe Lohengrin, King Iba Sutra's apprentice in Open Skills and effectively Gau's rival in the race to become the next Sevaar, falls in love with Kyuo at first sight and a love triangle develops. The two of them battle each other several times, Gau eventually coming out the overall victor. In respect, Lowe gives Gau his earrings, which Gau wears during his most important battles.

Voiced by: Akio Matsuoka (Japanese); Mathonwy Reeves (OAV), Greg Ayres (TV) (English)

=== Fia Arcana ===
Fia Arcana (フィアー・アルカナ, Fiā Arukana), also known as Faulee (フォウリィー, Fōryī) and later takes the title Faulink Meijer the Plasmatizer (ブラズマタイザー・フォウリンクマイヤー, Purazumataizā Fōrinku Maiyā), is the daughter of a famed Sui Rem, a sorcerer who uses magical talismans in battle, who was also a master of Shadow Skills. One of the laws of the Sui Rem states that when one's master is slain, their disciple(s) must cast off their name until the master has been avenged. Because of this, Fia changed her name to Faulink Maya ("Faulee" for short), later gaining the nickname "Plasmatizer".

When she first met Elle, Fia resented her and looked at her as a rival. However, when news came that Elle had killed her father in battle, that sense of rivalry turned to rage.

Eventually, she managed to hunt down Elle and confront her. During the battle Faury attempted to kill Elle using the Nothingness Talisman, a forbidden spell known only to the Arcana family, but the mine collapsing as a result of the fight precluded this, trapping Faury under debris to where she could not escape. Surprisingly, Elle rescued her and carried her out of the mine. Faury, now beginning to have doubts as to Elle's guilt, decided to accompany her and see what kind of person Elle was.

In the following years, Faury became good friends with Elle and would often act as an older sister figure. She looked at Elle as a child of light, loved by the gods, while herself as a child of darkness who envied the light. She looked out for Elle as her conscience.

It is later revealed that it was not Elle who had killed her father, but Louie Francil, another disciple of her father. He tells them that he had intended for Faury and Elle to kill each other so that he alone could claim the inheritance of his master's powers and title. Gau overhears this and fights and defeats Louie, blasting him off the cliff where they stood overlooking Elle and Faury, consequently aborting their own battle.

From then on, Faury's friendship with Elle became even stronger. In the manga, it was emphasized that Faury was a bad cook, and was also revealed later in the series (after the point where the anime ends) that she was also married. Her husband's name was Woaks Porelo, and it was revealed that they had married in Juliannes 4 years previous, when Faury was 15. Her reason for leaving him had been because of her father's murder, and subsequently Faury's search for Elle.

Voiced by: Yuko Mizutani (Japanese); Sarah Wateridge (OAV), Laurel Lefkow (movie), Christine Auten (TV) (English)

=== Kyuo Liu ===
Kyuo Liu (キュオ・リュー, Kyuo Ryū) is a former member of the Septia troupe Phantom, a group of trained hunters who tracked down demon-beasts, capturing and taming them for use in society. Her grandfather, Jin Stolla, was the leader of Phantom and considered to be one of the greatest Septias ever. When Phantom decided to go after the legendary demon beast, the King of the Moon, they had no idea what they were up against. The King of the Moon, whose powers of strength and regeneration were unstoppable while under the moonlight, destroyed an entire village. The Phantom unit tried to stop the beast but they were all wiped out just in one night. In the morning, Kyuo found the corpses of her teammates and buried them.

Kyuo returned to Kurda and tried to hire a group of thugs to help her hunt down the King of the Moon, but they had other things in mind (a young defenseless girl alone in a bar, you get the idea). Luckily, Elle and Gau overheard the conversation from their table, and Gau immediately jumped right in to defend Kyuo. When the thugs found out that the 59th Sevaar was on Kyuo's side, they immediately ran for the hills. Kyuo paid Elle for the help, which unfortunately went to cover Elle's debts. Kyuo offered them more money if they were willing to help her, however Elle was hesitant at first because she thought Kyuo wanted her help to capture the demon-beast. It startled everyone, therefore, when Kyuo admitted that she wanted it dead, not captured – a desire counter to the purpose Septias played in society. Upon that, Elle agreed.

During the hunt, Kyuo showed a remarkable talent for setting traps, as well as handling a series of chakram-like rings called chulinks. These rings are an integral part of a Septia's abilities and duties, serving as focal points to activate and control their traps. In combat chulinks could also be used as weapons; by attaching a cord to it, a chulink could be used as both a throwing weapon as well as in a way similar to a whip.

That night, the King of the Moon appeared and a fierce battle ensued. Elle and Gau's attacks were devastating, even so far as splitting the demon-beast in half, but as the fight was occurring beneath a full moon, the demon-beast was able to heal even the most debilitating wounds as soon as they occurred, even regenerate severed limbs. It was Kyuo's efforts in the end that saved them, her traps pinning the demon-beast in place until the sun rose, and the King of the Moon's powers waned to the point where it could be, and was, killed. With her revenge now complete, Kyuo had nowhere left to go, so Elle invited her to join the group. She has been with them ever since.

During her stay with the group, Kyuo was often emphasized as the weakest member of the group, especially as compared to Elle and Gau's Shadow Skills and Faury's Sui Rem talisman magic. It was also revealed that Kyuo possessed horrific scars on both arms from the early days of her training, a result of mishandling her chulinks. Later on, she met Lohengrin, a Vaar who specialized in Open Skills, who fell madly in love with her but whose affections she did not seem to notice. Following the Lightning Battle, Kyuo managed to get some quality time alone with Gau, but Gau's immense progress left Kyuo afraid of being left behind because she was weak.

In practicing to become stronger, Kyuo was able to successfully master the Tomoway, a style of chulink-throwing and opponent-capturing which her late grandfather was famous for being a master of. One night during her practice, she was confronted with a familiar face, one that she was shocked to see. Her grandfather, or so she thought.

It was actually Iba Stolla, the 55th Sevaar and king of Kurda, and also Jin Stolla's twin brother. He revealed to her that he was actually her granduncle and that he would use his power to protect her until the day came that she would find a man who would love and protect her.

During G's attack, Kyuo did not want Gau to get hurt, and so placed herself on the frontline in order to stop G before Gau would have to fight. However, given that her opponent was a Sevaar, as expected Kyuo lost badly and was very nearly killed. When Gau found her, still alive but bloody and near death, he snapped and in a rage attacked G.

Towards the end of the series, Kyuo suspected that Gau was more than a brother to Elle, but it was not until during Solfon's attack on Kurda that she confronted Elle. As a result, their quarrel was cut short. At the end of the series, when Elle was exiled along with Gau, she followed them from the shadows, so as to keep an eye on them.

Voiced by: Ikue Ohtani (Japanese); Holly Rivers (OAV), Elly Fairman (movie), Hillary Haag (TV) (English)

== Supporting characters ==
=== Díaz Ragu ===
Díaz Ragu (ディアス・ラグ, Diasu Ragu), known by his fighting name the "Black Wing", is considered one of the strongest fighters that Ashlianna has ever seen. Thirsting for strength ever since he was a boy, Diaz earned a reputation during the war as a cold-blooded killing machine, he didn't care who he fought or killed. He fought side-by-side with Kai Shinks and Vy Low, the 56th and 57th Sevaars Crimson and Scarface, eventually becoming close friends with both.

When Diaz turned 16, he was on his way to becoming the 58th Sevaar when his parents contracted a rare disease and died. Later on, his younger sister Elle was also infected. After losing both his parents, he would not stand by and watch his sister die. He decided to put his ambitions aside and went to fight as a mercenary so he could earn enough money to buy medicine for Elle. He succeeded and was able to save Elle's life, but as a result of the extra battles that he fought in, his body was greatly weakened and had to give up his dreams of becoming a Sevaar. Because of this, the title of 58th Sevaar went to Kain Phalanx. Elle, feeling guilty about this, decided that she would take her brother's place and become Sevaar and several years later, succeeded in becoming the 59th Sevaar.

After Elle left, Diaz stayed in his hometown of Blorahan, where he lived a quiet life as a weaponsmith. It was hinted that Scarface and Kai visited him frequently, bringing him booze. As years went by, his condition worsened. His eyesight was slowly fading and his body was deteriorating. However, even in his weakened state, he was still very powerful. So powerful in fact, that Solfon wanted to capture him, so that he would both forge weapons for them and at the same time, fight on their side. Diaz obviously refused this, so Solfon had no choice but to use force. This was the beginning of the Battle of Blorahan, also known as the Lightning Battle.

A few weeks before Solfon approached Diaz, he met Elle for the first time since she had left, and was also introduced to Gau Ban. Diaz took an immediate liking to Gau and considered him as family, telling Gau to protect Elle for him. When the Lighting Battle occurred, Gau was ordered by Scarface to protect Diaz; and unbeknown to him, Kai Shinks was also on his way. When they arrived at Blorahan, Solfon had already surrounded the town. Kai offered Diaz some medicine that would delay the deterioration of his body, however Diaz refused as he believed that everything that happens is for a reason. He lent Gau his prized Black Wing boomerang, the source of his nickname, so that Gau could use it to protect his own life while Kai escorted him to Kurda.

After the Lightning Battle, Diaz lived in Kurda alone, Kyuo coming over every day to wash his clothes and cook for him. He also told Gau that there are certain battles that can be only fought by oneself. During G's attack on the city, Diaz chose to make a comeback and volunteered to protect Kurda as a Vaar. Together, he, Scarface, and Kai managed to extinguish the fire that blazed in Kurda while Gau fought G.

As Gau grew stronger, Vy decided to further his plans to have Gau become stronger, which Diaz didn't like. He threatened Scarface that if he was to harm his family, he would not hesitate to fight back. This, however, did not deter the 57th Sevaar in the slightest. When Vy asked Darkness to teach Gau the fear of death, Diaz, being the protective older brother, went to Gau's rescue. Knowing his time was near, Diaz put everything he had into this fight. The resulting fight proved that even in his condition, Diaz was still one of the greatest warriors Ashlianna had ever seen. Diaz won the battle ultimately, but he also died moments later, his body finally succumbing to the ravages of his injuries.

Shortly after his death, he was bestowed the title of "The Sword of Ashlianna" by Princess Lilivelt Lu Biju, the highest honor ever granted. Though Diaz had indeed earned this title, its bestowment was politically motivated as well: because of Shere Kahn and Ren Fuuma's machinations, war was threatening to break out between Kurda and the other cities. By granting the title of "The Sword of Ashlianna" to a Kurdan citizen, that war was immediately averted, as no one desired to go against the Holy City's decree.

Later on, however, it was revealed that on Diaz' death, his soul had been deliberately sealed by Darkness into his Black Eye until such time as Kai Shinks could restore his body. During Gau's battle with Ren Fuuma, the efforts of Kai, Darkness, and Lunaris Umbra finally bore fruit. Diaz came back as an angel to give his brother "a little push" to victory. That is the last we see of Diaz until a mysterious dialogue between Darkness and Lunaris about someone who suddenly disappeared because his mission was over, to bring courage to a boy.

Voiced by: Mitsuru Miyamoto (Japanese); Roger May (OAV), Jason Douglas (TV) (English)

=== Vy Low ===
Vy Low (ヴァイ・ロー, Vai Rō), the 57th Sevaar known as Scarface, is the most powerful warrior in the history of Kurda. Receiving the title of High-Sevaar at the age of 16 when he defeated King Eva Stroll, the 55th Sevaar Hawk Eyes, in combat, he became the heir to the throne and a role model for the new generation of Vaar to follow. He seems to take a liking to Gau and Elle, Gau most especially. Like all Sevaar, he tends to put up an aloof air whenever he is in public, not even glancing at his own wife, Folstise, the Ordo Codex of Juliannes. He also seems to have something of a drinking problem, always having an extra bottle of booze sneaked into his cape.

When Gau Ban first traveled to Kurda, Vy immediately recognized his potential. Throughout the series, he has played a prominent role in the molding of young Gau. He usually influences Gau in an indirect manner, such setting up battles for him to fight. At other times he would act like a father figure and give him advice that is completely in contrast to the ones given by Diaz. He is actually obsessed in making Gau in to the ultimate warrior, and as such he constantly seeks to test him somehow. Unbeknownst to Gau and the others, Vy is actually the elder son of Shere Kahn, founder of Yin-ryū, and the older brother of Gau.

Voiced by: Yasunori Matsumoto (Japanese); Jonathan Keeble (OAV), John Swasey (TV) (English)

=== Scribe Lohengrin ===
Scribe Lohengrin (スクリーブ・ローエングリン, Sukurību Rōengurin), or "The White Lightning", is seen in minor roles in Shadow Skill parts 1 and 2. He is the personal apprentice to the Kurda King, Iba Stol—perhaps the King's ward? Upon hearing of Gau's emerging talent, Low challenged him at least twice. One challenge ended in a draw, the other ended in Gau forgetting all his angst and releasing the full power of Shadow Skill on the older boy. Now they are good friends, and two sides of an uneven love triangle involving Kyou. (Low likes Kyou, Kyou likes Gau. At least in the TV series. The manga has a different take on things.) He wears big, red, cherry-like earrings which play a role in Gau's most crucial fight at the end of the series.

Voiced by: Kappei Yamaguchi (Japanese); Daniel Marinker (OAV), Illich Guardiola (TV) (English)

=== Kain Phalanx ===
Kain Phalanx (カイン・ファランクス, Kain Farankusu) is the 58th Sevaar of Kurda, and goes by the moniker of G, the seventh letter in the Latin alphabet which symbolizes the strongest.

Voiced by: Kôji Tsujitani (Japanese); Jay Hickman (TV) (English)

=== Kai Shinks ===
Kai Shinks (カイ・シンク, Kai Shinku), also known as Crimson and Lazarame Silver Sword, is the 56th Sevaar. He is a master bladesman, wealthy businessman, and high-ranking officer of the Kurodan government. In addition to his status as a Sevaar, he is also a Raza Reme (the only sevaar ever to do so), a master of the divine power of Souma, and is the magical representative of his home country of Kuroda at the Holy City of Juliannes. He worked with Darkness to resurrect Black Wing, recipient of Ashliana's highest honor, after Dias Rague died in a duel in which he defeated Darkness. Despite being the closest associate of his successor Scarface, he was responsible for giving him his famous scar when they fought in a duel before Vy Low became the 57th Sevaar.

Voiced by: Takehito Koyasu (Japanese); Chris Patton (TV) (English)

=== Eva Stolla ===
Eva Stolla (イバ・ストラ, Iba Sutora) is the 55th Sevaar and is a master of Open Skill, and the twin brother of Jin Stolla, the leader of Septia troupe Phantom. He was once defeated in personal combat by Vy Low, which enabled Scarface to become the second High-Sevaar after Hawk Eyes, and was also the subject of an assassination attempt by G, Kain Phalanx, the rogue 58th Sevaar, who Scarface killed in defense of the king's honor. He is of Screb Lohengrin and guardian of his grand-niece Kyuo Liu, whom he took under his wing after her grandfather was killed when the monster known as the Moon King massacred the rest of their group of demon-beast-hunters.

Voiced by: Masaharu Satou (Japanese); Marty Fleck (TV) (English)

== Juliannes ==
=== Ashubal ===
Ashubal is the king of Juliannes.

Voiced by: Hiroki Takahashi (Japanese); Jay Hickman (English)

=== Rirubelt ===
Rirubelt is the princess of Juliannes.

Voiced by: Yuri Amano (Japanese); Monica Rial (English)

=== Glad Di ===
Glad Di is the Commander of the Juliannes Imperial Guard.

Voiced by: Fumihiko Tachiki (Japanese); Vic Mignogna (English)

=== Faulstis Low ===
Faulstis Low is the bearer of the Ordo Codex, daughter of Glad Di, wife of Vy Low, and royal knight of Juliannes.

Voiced by: Rei Igarashi (Japanese); Elizabeth Byrd (English)

== Four Divas ==
=== Gian Deez ===
Voiced by: Kyoko Tsuruno (Japanese); Kayla Crenshaw (English)

=== Sai Oh ===
Voiced by: Kazuyuki Sogabe (Japanese); Lee Stringer (English)

=== Kaira La Luca ===
Voiced by: Chinami Nishimura (Japanese); Kira Vincent-Davis (English)
