= Ojarumaru series 8 =

Ojarumaru
- Series 8
- No. of episodes: 90

Release
- Original network: NHK
- Original release: April 4 – December 2, 2005

Series chronology
- ← Previous; Series 7

The eighth series of the Ojarumaru anime series aired from April 4 to December 2, 2005, on NHK for a total of 90 episodes. The series' opening theme is "Utahito" (詠人) by Saburō Kitajima. The ending theme is "Gekkō Machi no Uta" (月光町のうた Moonlight Town's Song) by Chinami Nishimura and Yūji Ueda.

== Episodes ==
No.	Title	Original release date
631	"N/A"	April 4, 2005
632	"N/A"	April 5, 2005
633	"Penguin, Penguin"	April 6, 2005
634	"Okame Photo"	April 7, 2005
635	"Enma's Cradle"	April 8, 2005
636	"Poverty-chan's Tooth Brushing Day"	April 11, 2005
637	"N/A"	April 12, 2005
638	"To Deliver a Bento"	April 13, 2005
639	"N/A"	April 14, 2005
640	"Tree Tsukkī"	April 15, 2005
641	"The Person Like an Oni"	April 18, 2005
642	"Formation〜 Boy's Club"	April 19, 2005
643	"N/A"	April 20, 2005
644	"N/A"	April 21, 2005
645	"Coffee Mask and Mike"	April 22, 2005
646	"Kappa"	April 25, 2005
647	"The Tamura Family's Air Conditioner is Broken"	April 26, 2005
648	"Kame in Tome with Tome in Kame"	April 27, 2005
649	"Mazuka"	April 28, 2005
650	"The Oni Child Anniversary"	April 29, 2005
651	"Ai-chan's Project P"	May 2, 2005
652	"Tommy Museum"	May 3, 2005
653	"Ojaru Hand"	May 4, 2005
654	"N/A"	May 5, 2005
655	"Ai-chan, Savings Plan"	May 6, 2005
656	"Tamae's Strength"	May 9, 2005
657	"N/A"	May 10, 2005
658	"N/A"	May 11, 2005
659	"Crisis Management"	May 12, 2005
660	"The Long Chair"	May 13, 2005
661	"Ojaru Swims"	May 16, 2005
662	"Spirit of the Spring"	May 17, 2005
663	"The Wonderful Goat"	May 18, 2005
664	"I'm Not Pleased"	May 19, 2005
665	"N/A"	May 20, 2005
666	"Whose Dream?"	May 23, 2005
667	"N/A"	May 24, 2005
668	"Aim at the Idol"	May 25, 2005
669	"Oko-Niko Invites"	May 26, 2005
670	"Denbo and Neon"	May 27, 2005
671	"Katapi Returns to His Hometown"	May 30, 2005
672	"N/A"	May 31, 2005
673	"N/A"	June 1, 2005
674	"Moyako"	June 2, 2005
675	"Marie Basket"	June 3, 2005
676	"The Song of Tsukkii"	October 3, 2005
677	"Ken in the Cap"	October 4, 2005
678	"N/A"	October 5, 2005
679	"N/A"	October 6, 2005
680	"Huge"	October 7, 2005
681	"Hoshino, Smiles"	October 10, 2005
682	"Chikuwa 2"	October 11, 2005
683	"N/A"	October 12, 2005
684	"Fairy Girl"	October 13, 2005
685	"Curtain"	October 14, 2005
686	"Blue, Red, Yellow, Ken"	October 17, 2005
687	"Enma Gets Lured"	October 18, 2005
688	"Usui Black Tea Mask"	October 19, 2005
689	"Mobile Phone Denbo"	October 20, 2005
690	"N/A"	October 21, 2005
691	"The Three Piece Set, Increases"	October 24, 2005
692	"N/A"	October 25, 2005
693	"Hoshino, Gets Stuck Again"	October 26, 2005
694	"The Waiting Way"	October 27, 2005
695	"The Scepter, Becomes Delicious"	October 28, 2005
696	"Volley, Ballet"	October 31, 2005
697	"Paradise"	November 1, 2005
698	"N/A"	November 2, 2005
699	"Kazuma's Birthday"	November 3, 2005
700	"Tomayo"	November 4, 2005
701	"Penguin, Penguin, Penguin"	November 7, 2005
702	"Mr. Ken Finds His New Self"	November 8, 2005
703	"The Forest and Ojarumaru"	November 9, 2005
704	"N/A"	November 10, 2005
705	"N/A"	November 11, 2005
706	"Deliver Pudding"	November 14, 2005
707	"My Pork"	November 15, 2005
708	"Yesterday's Ojarumaru"	November 16, 2005
709	"N/A"	November 17, 2005
710	"Mr. Director's Secret Flower Garden"	November 18, 2005
711	"Returning Home"	November 21, 2005
712	"Otome, Doing an Arranged Marriage"	November 22, 2005
713	"There's No Lid"	November 23, 2005
714	"Chikuwa 3"	November 24, 2005
715	"N/A"	November 25, 2005
716	"The Tiny Things Club Presentation"	November 28, 2005
717	"Otome Twirling"	November 29, 2005
718	"The Stairway"	November 30, 2005
719	"Usui's World"	December 1, 2005
720	"Oja-Dance"	December 2, 2005
