= Ojarumaru series 7 =

Ojarumaru
- Series 7
- No. of episodes: 90

Release
- Original network: NHK
- Original release: April 5 – December 6, 2004

Series chronology
- ← Previous; Series 6 Next → Series 8

The seventh series of the Ojarumaru anime series aired from April 5 to December 6, 2004, on NHK for a total of 90 episodes.

The series' opening theme is "Utahito" (詠人) by Saburō Kitajima. The ending theme is "Warera Gekkō Chō Chicchai Mono Club" (われら月光町ちっちゃいものクラブ Our Moonlight Town Tiny Things Club) by Rie Iwatsubo, Satomi Kōrogi, Ryō Naitō, Chinami Nishimura, and Ayaka Saitō.

Episodes 546, 565, 571, 613, 614, 617, and 630 were released on a compilation DVD (that also includes selected episodes from Series 8) by NHK Enterprises on January 25, 2008. Episodes 551 through 561, 563 through 569, 571, and 572 were streamed on Hulu Japan and U-Next, but were eventually removed from U-Next in 2014 and Hulu Japan in April 2015. However, the episodes are currently available on dTV and Video Pass.

== Episodes ==
No.	Title	Original release date
541	"Enma, Becomes the Scepter"	April 5, 2004
542	"The Tiny, Tiny Things Club Race"	April 6, 2004
543	"Denbo's Room"	April 7, 2004
544	"N/A"	April 8, 2004
545	"Usui Receives a Yonkoma"	April 9, 2004
546	"Stopping at Each Floor"	April 12, 2004
547	"Tanaka Stays in Bed"	April 13, 2004
548	"N/A"	April 14, 2004
549	"Hoshino, Doing a Lottery"	April 15, 2004
550	"Usui: The Yonkoma Meeting"	April 16, 2004
551	"Dig Here, Tsukkii"	April 19, 2004
552	"The Okobou Nikobou Weather Forecast"	April 20, 2004
553	"The Oni Child Feast"	April 21, 2004
554	"Sleep-talking"	April 22, 2004
555	"Usui: The Yonkoma Debuts"	April 23, 2004
556	"Ojaru's Ticket"	April 26, 2004
557	"N/A"	April 27, 2004
558	"N/A"	April 28, 2004
559	"Kame-Tome, Talk About Men"	April 29, 2004
560	"Ms. Marie's Butler"	April 30, 2004
561	"The Great Skipping Strategy"	May 3, 2004
562	"Enma-Papa Comes"	May 4, 2004
563	"Honda-sensei Keeps on Running"	May 5, 2004
564	"Hide-and-seek"	May 6, 2004
565	"Mecha Denbo Takeoff"	May 7, 2004
566	"The Mustache and Otome"	May 10, 2004
567	"Akane, Leaves the House"	May 11, 2004
568	"Denbo Sticks onto Kin-chan's Candy"	May 12, 2004
569	"Snowstorm Tea Journey"	May 13, 2004
570	"Aobee Transforms"	May 14, 2004
571	"Ojaru Steps on Gum"	May 17, 2004
572	"Straying the Map"	May 18, 2004
573	"Ken and Gen"	May 19, 2004
574	"The Oni Child and the Horizontal Bar"	May 20, 2004
575	"Infiltrate! The Girls Club"	May 21, 2004
576	"Ken Catches a Ghost"	May 24, 2004
577	"N/A"	May 25, 2004
578	"Farewell, Okame"	May 26, 2004
579	"The Old Men's Capsule"	May 27, 2004
580	"Mama Becomes Denbo"	May 28, 2004
581	"The Lost Property"	May 31, 2004
582	"Mr. Shōshin's News From Moonlight Town"	June 1, 2004
583	"Oja Riding Hood 2"	June 2, 2004
584	"The 108th Year Proposal"	June 3, 2004
585	"N/A"	June 4, 2004
586	"Tomorrow's Iwashimizu-kun"	October 4, 2004
587	"The Tiny Things Election"	October 5, 2004
588	"Mr. Kawakami's Happy 3 Days"	October 6, 2004
589	"Great King Enma's Birthday"	October 7, 2004
590	"Fly, Cold Tessai"	October 8, 2004
591	"N/A"	October 11, 2004
592	"Cold Tessai's Long Hair"	October 12, 2004
593	"False Soup"	October 13, 2004
594	"The Tiny, Tiny Things Club Fan Club"	October 14, 2004
595	"Usui-sensei"	October 15, 2004
596	"Mr. Kanbutsu Depressed"	October 18, 2004
597	"Tea and the Mechanical Doll"	October 19, 2004
598	"The Twin Dogs Bark at the Moon"	October 20, 2004
599	"The Drawing Song"	October 21, 2004
600	"N/A"	October 22, 2004
601	"Claudia"	October 26, 2004
602	"N/A"	October 27, 2004
603	"N/A"	October 28, 2004
604	"The God of Fortune's Worry"	October 29, 2004
605	"Ai-chan is 18 Years Old"	November 1, 2004
606	"The Mobile Phones of Love"	November 2, 2004
607	"Ojaru Rolls Up His Sleeves"	November 3, 2004
608	"N/A"	November 4, 2004
609	"Run, Oni Child"	November 5, 2004
610	"Ai-chan's Yellow Dress"	November 8, 2004
611	"Treasure Hunting Game"	November 9, 2004
612	"The Audition of Marie Mansion"	November 10, 2004
613	"The Tamura Family Can't Leave From the Kotatsu"	November 11, 2004
614	"Hoshino, Gets Stuck"	November 12, 2004
615	"Tamae and Poverty-chan"	November 15, 2004
616	"Cow Doing an Arranged Marriage Again"	November 16, 2004
617	"Penguin"	November 17, 2004
618	"To the Moonlight Tower Again"	November 18, 2004
619	"Asa-chan's Bride Teaching"	November 19, 2004
620	"Ojaru, Becomes Lost"	November 22, 2004
621	"Ukkun, Okkun"	November 23, 2004
622	"Ojaru Sleeps on a Bed"	November 24, 2004
623	"Ken's Store"	November 25, 2004
624	"Father, Mother......?"	November 26, 2004
625	"Rainy Day Making a Story"	November 29, 2004
626	"Momoman 2"	November 30, 2004
627	"The Mechanical Elder Brother Doll"	December 1, 2004
628	"The Conductor"	December 2, 2004
629	"N/A"	December 3, 2004
630	"N/A"	December 6, 2004
