= Brett Weaver =

American voice actor

- Born: November 16, 1966 (age 59); Lafayette, Louisiana
- Occupation: Voice actor
- Spouse: E.K. Weaver
- Website: www.brettweavervoice.com

Brett A. Weaver (born November 16, 1966) is an American voice actor, known for his roles in English-language dubs of anime series. He lives in Austin, Texas with his wife, cartoonist and graphic novelist E.K. Weaver.

Weaver got his start in radio before providing anime voice-over roles with ADV Films. He was also a member of a theatre group with fellow ADV alumni Chris Patton, Laura Chapman, Christine Auten, and Amanda Winn Lee.

== Anime roles ==
- Attack on Titan - Gunther
- Attack on Titan: Junior High - Gunther
- Bubblegum Crisis Tokyo 2040 - Kane
- Burst Angel: Infinity - Commissioner
- Case Closed - Hamilton Timberman, Hadrian Timberman, Mark Newman (FUNimation dub)
- Casshern Sins - Tetsu (Ep. 11)
- Dark Warrior - Joe Takagami
- Dragon Half - Damaramu
- Evangelion: Death and Rebirth - Toji Suzuhara
- Excel Saga - Nabeshin
- Fire Emblem (anime) - Julian
- Full Metal Panic! - Andy (Ep. 15)
- Fullmetal Alchemist: Brotherhood - Cremin
- Gantz - Akitoshi Okazaki, Koji Tachibana, Boyfriend (Episode 7)
- Gasaraki - Kiyoharu Gowa
- Godannar - Goh Saruwatari
- Gunsmith Cats - Jonathan Washington (debut)
- Gurren Lagann (ADV Dub) - Kamina Jiha
- Hakuōki: Dawn of the Shinsegumi - Kamo Serizawa
- Intrigue in the Bakumatsu - Irohanihoheto - H.S. Parkes, Shinzaemon Tatewaki
- Jing: King of Bandits - Vodka
- Ki*Me*Ra - Osamu
- Mardock Scramble: The Second Combustion - Ashley Harvest
- Martian Successor Nadesico - Gai Daigoji, Tsukomo Shiratori
- My Bride Is a Mermaid - Shibasaki (Ep. 5)
- Neon Genesis Evangelion - Toji Suzuhara (Ep. 25–26)
- Nerima Daikon Brothers - Rental Shop Guy
- New Cutie Honey - Akira/Devilman
- Nurse Witch Komugi - Nabeshin (ep. 4)
- One Piece - Morgan, Daz Bonez, Stansen (FUNimation dub)
- Phantom ~Requiem for the Phantom - Muroto (Ep. 14)
- Princess Nine - Ishimaru
- Puni Puni Poemi - Nabeshin
- Ruin Explorers - Gill, Miguel
- Samurai 7 - Syusai
- Slayers Special - Jeffery
- SoltyRei - Vincent Greco (Ep. 6)
- Sorcerer Hunters - Carrot
- Sorcerer on The Rocks - Genmi
- Spectral Force - Lead Hero
- Street Fighter II V - Ryu (ADV Dub, first voice)
- Tears to Tiara - Cecil, Gaius
- The End of Evangelion - Toji Suzuhara
- The Super Dimension Fortress Macross - Roy Focker
- Ushio & Tora - Tora
- Vinland Saga - Thorgil (Crunchyroll dub)
- The Wallflower - Mysterious Voice/Nabeshin
- Witchblade (anime) - Akira Nakata
- Those Who Hunt Elves - Hammerhead
- Zone of the Enders - Hines

=== Other roles ===
- Smite - Default Announcer and VGS
- Team Four Star's Hellsing Ultimate Abridged - Commander Violet
