= Mike Kleinhenz =

American voice actor (1951–2008)

- Born: Michael Anthony Kleinhenz; November 14, 1951; Cincinnati, Ohio
- Died: July 11, 2008 (aged 56); Houston, Texas
- Occupation: Voice Actor/Actor
- Years active: 1971–2008
- Notable credits: Full Metal Panic! as Andrei Sergeivich Kalinin; Madlax as Friday Monday
- Spouse: Sydnie Meltzer Kleinhenz (divorced)
- Children: 5

Michael Anthony Kleinhenz (November 14, 1951 – July 11, 2008) was an American voice actor who frequently participated in translation and dubbing of Japanese anime. His voice also appeared in national TV and radio advertisements and local advertisements in the Houston area.

== History ==
Mike Kleinhenz was born in Cincinnati, Ohio. He graduated from Pascack Valley High School in Hillsdale, New Jersey in 1969 and from the University of Cincinnati in 1974 with a B.A. degree in Radio and TV Broadcasting. After college he settled in Houston, Texas. He married Sydnie Diane Meltzer in 1981 (divorced 2003) and raised five sons.

In college, Kleinhenz led the Bearcats defensive line and was selected to play in the Ohio Shrine Bowl. After graduation, he tried out with the San Francisco Giants and played pre-season football for the Houston Oilers. Shortly before his first son was born, Kleinhenz competed in the 35K racewalk at the US Olympic Festival. He remained active throughout his life. His sports interests included football, basketball, baseball, fast-pitch softball, mountain biking, running, disc golf and snagging.

At home, Kleinhenz was a singer and guitar player. Outside of the house, he was more recognized for his role in dubbing Japanese anime and as a voice-over artist in commercials.

Kleinhenz suffered a heart attack and died on July 11, 2008.

== Filmography ==
- All Purpose Cultural Cat Girl Nuku Nuku DASH! as Executive B
- Bubblegum Crisis Tokyo 2040 as Doctor
- Chrono Crusade as Ricardo Hendric
- Crying Freeman as Yakuza Boss
- Excel Saga as Kabapu
- Full Metal Panic!, The Second Raid, and Fumoffu as Andrei Kalinin
- Gantz as Goro Suzuki
- Gasaraki as Meth/Nozomi Takayama/Regent
- Kaleido Star as Hamilton
- Kino's Journey as Trader C (Ep. 2)
- Lady Death: The Motion Picture as Lucifer, Matthias
- Madlax as Friday Monday
- Megazone 23 as Director General
- Najica Blitz Tactics as Jin Majima
- Neon Genesis Evangelion (Director's Cut) as SEELE
- Noir as Legrand
- Parasite Dolls as Takahashi
- Princess Tutu as The Raven
- RahXephon as Shirow Watari
- Samurai Gun as Tavern Master
- Slayers Return as Father
- Sorcerer on the Rocks as Narrator/Icarus
- Spriggan as Fattman
- Street Fighter II V as M. Bison (ADV Dub replacing Markham Anderson)
- Those Who Hunt Elves as Judge
- Ushio and Tora as Bully/Ishikui/Motorist/Newscaster
