= Ojarumaru series 6 =

Ojarumaru
- Series 6
- No. of episodes: 90

Release
- Original network: NHK
- Original release: April 7 – December 8, 2003

Series chronology
- ← Previous; Series 5 Next → Series 7

The sixth series of the Ojarumaru anime series aired from April 7 to December 8, 2003, on NHK for a total of 90 episodes.

The series' opening theme is "Utahito" (詠人) by Saburō Kitajima. The ending theme is "Kono Machi Itsumo ~Bin-chan no Uta~" (この町いつも〜貧ちゃんの歌〜 Always in this Town ~Poverty-chan's Song~) by Ayaka Saitō.

The series was released on VHS and DVD by NHK Enterprises across two compilation volumes, each containing 8 selected episodes. The DVDs were released simultaneously on July 23, 2004, while the tapes were released simultaneously on August 27, 2004. The first volume contains episodes 465, 478, 481, 504, 507, 508, 527, and 533. The second volume contains episodes 467, 473, 486, 495, 514, 522, 529, and 537.

== Episodes ==
No.	Title	Original release date
451	"It's Moonlight Town, Mother"	April 7, 2003
452	"Okame Fed Up"	April 8, 2003
453	"The Oni Child Trains"	April 9, 2003
454	"Nedzu Runs at Full Speed"	April 10, 2003
455	"Kazuma Wants That Rock"	April 11, 2003
456	"N/A"	April 14, 2003
457	"Denboko Gets Caught"	April 15, 2003
458	"Usui: News From Hometown"	April 16, 2003
459	"When Did You Take the Family Photos?"	April 17, 2003
460	"The Mechanical Commentary Doll"	April 18, 2003
461	"Papas"	April 21, 2003
462	"The Treasure Chest isn't Opening"	April 22, 2003
463	"Denbo and Rika"	April 23, 2003
464	"Halted Honda-sensei"	April 24, 2003
465	"The 101 Denbos"	April 25, 2003
466	"N/A"	April 28, 2003
467	"N/A"	April 29, 2003
468	"Ojarumaru Masters Kindness"	April 30, 2003
469	"Gyoza Party"	May 1, 2003
470	"N/A"	May 2, 2003
471	"Moonlight Town Whimsical Walk"	May 5, 2003
472	"Uncle's Repayment"	May 6, 3003
473	"N/A"	May 7, 2003
474	"Mr. Kawakami's Laid-back Day"	May 8, 2003
475	"Usui Breaks a Pen"	May 9, 2003
476	"Kazuma Becomes a Bad Child"	May 12, 2003
477	"Usui's Album"	May 13, 2003
478	"The Moonlight Hot Spring"	May 14, 2003
479	"The Oni Child Trio Decides at 9:05"	May 15, 2003
480	"N/A"	May 16, 2003
481	"Fuwarinbou"	May 19, 2003
482	"N/A"	May 20, 2003
483	"Denbo's Different Life"	May 21, 2003
484	"Enma Becomes Denboko"	May 22, 2003
485	"The Oni Child's Move"	May 23, 2003
486	"N/A"	May 26, 2003
487	"The Old Man and the Turtles"	May 27, 2003
488	"Enma Test"	May 28, 2003
489	"Denbo's Long Night"	May 29, 2003
490	"N/A"	May 30, 2003
491	"The White Tuxedo"	June 2, 2003
492	"Akane Grows Fat"	June 3, 2003
493	"Ai-chan: Taste of Mom's Cooking"	June 4, 2003
494	"N/A"	June 5, 2003
495	"Kazuma, Chikuwa, and Ojarumaru"	June 6, 2003
496	"Swelling"	October 6, 2003
497	"Cafe Marie"	October 7, 2003
498	"N/A"	October 8, 2003
499	"The Mysterious Gift"	October 9, 2003
500	"Diva Marie"	October 10, 2003
501	"Various Praises"	October 14, 2003
502	"Mosquito"	October 15, 2003
503	"Rainy Day Karuta"	October 16, 2003
504	"Kanae, Tamae"	October 17, 2003
505	"Kanae and Poverty-chan"	October 20, 2003
506	"Mr. Director and Tsukkii"	October 21, 2003
507	"English"	October 22, 2003
508	"Wiping the Window"	October 23, 2003
509	"N/A"	October 24, 2003
510	"The Oni Child Wears Makoto's Clothes"	October 25, 2003
511	"Flying Soap Bubbles"	October 28, 2003
512	"Iwashimizu-kun Feels Dizzy"	October 29, 2003
513	"Green Oni in the Cap"	October 30, 2003
514	"Oja Riding Hood"	October 31, 2003
515	"Tsukkii in a Log Cabin"	November 3, 2003
516	"Hoshino vs Yoshiko"	November 4, 2003
517	"The Tamura Family Prepares For a Journey"	November 5, 2003
518	"Welcome Home"	November 6, 2003
519	"During the Night and the Morning"	November 7, 2003
520	"Fake Pudding"	November 10, 2003
521	"N/A"	November 11, 2003
522	"Poverty Tent"	November 12, 2003
523	"The Tamura Family Can't Remember"	November 13, 2003
524	"Ojaruko-chan"	November 14, 2003
525	"Denbo Becomes Strict"	November 17, 2003
526	"Palm Reader Day"	November 18, 2003
527	"Kisuke's Love"	November 19, 2003
528	"Fake Ojaru"	November 20, 2003
529	"The Moonlight Town Tiny, Tiny Things Club"	November 21, 2003
530	"Ojarumaru and the Grasshopper"	November 24, 2003
531	"Haiku Classroom, Japanese Tea Classroom"	November 25, 2003
532	"N/A"	November 26, 2003
533	"Stuck Again"	November 27, 2003
534	"N/A"	November 28, 2003
535	"The Moonlight Town Quiz Tournament"	December 1, 2003
536	"The Great Effort Caterpillar"	December 2, 2003
537	"Whose Wish?"	December 3, 2003
538	"Enma and the Scepter"	December 4, 2003
539	"Catch Ball"	December 5, 2003
540	"The Other Side of the Puddle"	December 8, 2003
