= Street Fighter II V =

1995 Japanese anime series

- Promotional artwork showing most of the main characters

ストリートファイターII V (Sutorīto Faitā Tsū Bui)
- Genre: Action, adventure, drama, martial arts
- Anime television series
- Directed by: Gisaburō Sugii
- Produced by: Kenichi Imai, Masao Iki
- Written by: Kenichi Imai
- Music by: Masahiro Kawasaki
- Studio: Group TAC
- Original network: NNS (ytv)
- English network: Encore WAM, Encore Action
- Original run: April 10, 1995 – November 27, 1995
- Episodes: 29
- Manga

Street Fighter II V Retsuden
- Written by: Yasushi Baba
- Published by: Kodansha
- Magazine: Comic Bom Bom
- Original run: 1995 – 1996
- Volumes: 3

Street Fighter II V (Japanese: ストリートファイターII V, Hepburn: Sutorīto Faitā Tsū Bui) (Note: Pronounced "Street Fighter Two Vee".) is an anime series produced by Group TAC, loosely based on the 1994 fighting game Super Street Fighter II Turbo. The series is directed by Gisaburo Sugii, who also directed Street Fighter II: The Animated Movie, and aired in Japan from April 10 to November 27, 1995 on YTV (not to be confused with the Canadian television programming channel for children and teens of the same name).

== Premise ==
The series stars Ryu and Ken, teenage martial artists who embark on a journey to improve their skills after experiencing brutal defeat at the hands of Guile. Along the way, they become acquainted with other Street Fighter characters, such as tour guide Chun-Li, martial arts movie-star Fei Long, Muay Thai champion Sagat, and Indian monk Dhalsim. Eventually, they find themselves in the crosshairs of the criminal syndicate Shadaloo (referred to in the English dub as Shadowlaw) and their leader, the enigmatic M. Bison, after defeating Ashura, one of their subordinate organizations.

Among the agents of Shadowlaw are Russian bear wrestler and hired muscle Zangief, seductive British assassin Cammy, who is unaware of her employer's connection to Shadowlaw, and Interpol double agent Balrog. The Spanish nobleman Vega also appears as an antagonist, although he is not connected with Shadowlaw.

Unlike Street Fighter II: The Animated Movie, which stayed close to the original game's storyline, Street Fighter II V takes several liberties with its source material. It features redesigned versions of most of the game's characters, whose appearances, backstories, and personalities deviated greatly from their traditional depictions. While the show was set in 1995, the present year of its original airing, the ages of the characters were altered to make most of the cast younger than they were in the games. For example, Ryu's year of birth was changed from 1964 to 1977. Out of the seventeen characters featured in Super Street Fighter II Turbo,the latest game in the series at the time, only Blanka, Dee Jay, E. Honda, and T. Hawk do not appear in the show.

== Characters ==
- (Japan) Ryu
- Voiced by: Kouji Tsujitani (Japanese), Brett Weaver and Tommy Drake (English ADV dub), Skip Stellrecht (English Animaze dub)

The main protagonist. He is a 17-year-old martial artist dedicated to the lifestyle of martial arts who strives to improve his fighting skills. He was raised in the Japanese countryside on the fictional island of Mikuni. His best friend and sparring partner is Ken Masters, whom he has trained in the same dojo since childhood, to perform moves such as the Shouryuuken and the Tatsumaki Senpukyaku. After Ken flirts with one of the women accompanying them, Guile's soldiers attack him and Ken. Although they defeat the soldiers, Guile shows up and beats Ryu and Ken. The encounter with Guile humbles and inspires them to go on a journey to improve their martial arts skills, in hopes of challenging Guile to a rematch. During their travels, Ryu learns how to use a Chinese ki-based power called Hadoukou in the form of the Hadouken. Unlike his in-game counterpart, Ryu wears prayer beads on his left hand and has short spiky hair. Additionally, unlike the games, in which he is stern and stoic, he is more upbeat and simple-minded, but always seeking a good challenge. His full name is Ryu Hoshi in the English dubbed version.

- (United States) Ken Masters
- Voiced by: Kenji Haga (Japan), Jason Douglas (English ADV dub), Stephen Apostolina (English Animaze dub)

Ryu's best friend, who is also 17 years old. He was born to a Caucasian-American father and Japanese mother, who he lives with in San Francisco in a mansion, and is the only son of the multi-billionaire Masters family. Ken's personality and backstory are mostly unchanged from the original game, as he loves to show off and be a womanizer. Unlike his in-game counterpart; Ken has red hair, like he did in Street Fighter: The Ultimate Battle (1994). Eventually, Ken learns to use the power of Hadoukou while Shadaloo is holding him captive. He and Ryu both master the Tatsumaki Senpukyaku and the Shouryuuken, but he later empowers the Shouryuuken to the Hadou Shouryuuken, and then shortens it to the Hadou Shouryuu. In the English dub, Ken calls the move the Shouryuuken, while Ryu calls it by its English translation.

- (United States) Sgt. Guile
- Voiced by: Tesshō Genda (Japan), Rob Mungle (English ADV dub), Kirk Thornton (English Animaze dub)

A 22-year-old sergeant in the United States Air Force, stationed in San Francisco. He and his partner, Nash, have served together for many years. He takes pride in both the Air Force and his men and goes out drinking with them whenever he can. He regularly works out and lifts weights, and has won a boxing tournament. Unlike his game counterpart, his hairstyle is a crew-cut fade and his uniform is a navy-blue tank-top and khaki-green workwear; he later wears the same clothes but with reversed colors, along with a bomb-specialist black-vest. As well, he does not have a wife and daughter. The martial arts style that he uses is loosely based on combatives of the U.S military. Like his live-action counterpart from Street Fighter, Guile has no ki-force and uses a powerless version of his signature Flash Kick; he also carries weapons and artillery. Following his encounter with Ryu and Ken in the bar, Guile is not seen again until the second half of the series, where he is sent to rescue Ken, Ryu, and Chun-Li after Shadaloo kidnaps them. After seeing Ryu and Ken defeat Bison, Guile is impressed and comes to respect them. His full name is William F. Guile in the English dubbed version.

- (British Hong Kong) Chun-Li
- Voiced by: Chisa Yokoyama (Japan), Tamara Lo and Junie Hoang (English ADV dub), Lia Sargent (English Animaze dub)

A 15-year-old tour guide who Ken and Ryu hire upon their arrival in Hong Kong, who is seemingly 10 years younger than her game counterpart. She is the daughter of Dorai, the top inspector for the Hong Kong police who trains her in kung fu, both as self-defense and as part of her rearing. Like Ken, she comes from a wealthy and privileged background, although she is friendlier and more humble than him. She accompanies the pair throughout their journeys across Asia and Europe, but rarely engages in combat unless attacked or threatened. Ken becomes smitten with her to the point where he takes her on a shopping spree and buys her an expensive ring and clothes from various fashion houses. Despite this, it is never revealed if she reciprocates his feelings. She is not seen in her blue mini-qipao and white boots until the final season, where she is held captive at Bison's base. Changes to her outfit include the absence of her hair-bun covers as well as her pantyhose being replaced with kneepads. The only signature move that she uses from the game is her Yosokyaku. Her full name is Chun-Li Zang in the English dubbed version.

- (British Hong Kong) Fei Long
- Voiced by: Kazuki Yao (Japan), Andrew Klimko (English ADV dub), Randy McPherson (English Animaze dub)

One of Dorai's best students, a 17-year-old up-and-coming martial arts movie star whose insistence on "making the fight real" results in damage and injuries. Ken volunteers to be his opponent in a fight scene while touring Hong Kong with Ryu and Chun-Li, but the destruction the fight causes forces the director to halt the filming. After learning of his master's supposed death, he becomes distraught with grief and seeks to avenge him. While visiting the hospital where Dorai is staying, the Chief of Interpol informs Fei Long of the charade. Fei Long identifies Balrog as the Shadowlaw operative who ordered the hit on Dorai, with the assistance of Cammy after a fight with her in Dorai's hospital quarters. The only move Fei Long uses from the game is his Engekishu, which was a basic attack in the game.

- (British Hong Kong) Inspector Dorai
- Voiced by: Rokuro Naya (Japan), John Swasey (English ADV dub), Michael Forest (English Animaze dub)

Chun-Li's father, who was unnamed in the original games. He is the Vice Squad Captain for the Hong Kong Police Department and is routinely engaged in drug busts, sting operations, and various other police activities. His residence also functions as a temple and training ground, where he teaches his daughter and several other students, including Fei Long. Following the successful bust of a large cocaine-smuggling operation and the subsequent arrest of the Ashura kingpin behind it, he is called to Barcelona to attend an Interpol conference concerning the investigation of Shadowlaw. He is appointed to lead the investigation, but Cammy nearly kills him on Balrog's orders. The Chief of Interpol keeps his survival secret until the person who ordered the hit can be identified. Unlike his in-game counterpart, Dorai survives Shadaloo's attack.

- (Thailand) Sagat
- Voiced by: Banjō Ginga (Japan), Andrew Klimko (English ADV dub), Peter Spellos (English Animaze dub)

The "King of Muay Thai". When he fought professionally, he was the champion of Thailand and was known as "Champ". After refusing to participate in a match for the Ashura syndicate, he is framed for selling drugs. One of the Ashura syndicate's men plants heroin in Ryu's luggage at the airport in Bangkok, leading to Ryu's imprisonment in the same facility as Sagat. While there, they gain each other's respect and learn more about Ashura. After Ashura's kingpin is arrested, Thai police discover evidence of Sagat's innocence and he is released from prison. Unlike his video game counterpart, Sagat does not work for Shadaloo, still has both eyes, and lacks a chest scar. Therefore, his rivalry with Ryu is more of a friendly one and not based on prior resentment. The only move Sagat uses from the game is his Tiger Knee. His full name is Viktor Sagat in the English dubbed version.

- (India) Dhalsim
- Voiced by: Shōzō Iizuka (Japan), Mike Kleinhenz (English ADV dub), Steve Blum (English Animaze dub)

A monk who lives in a remote village in India. He is a practitioner of yoga who possesses psychic abilities and predicted the eventual arrival of Ryu and Ken prior to their births. Sagat had earlier instructed Ryu to seek Dhalsim for advice about the Ways of Hadou. Ryu and Ken are initially turned down, with Dhalsim describing them as "beasts", but he changes his mind after seeing them overcome the challenges within the village temple. However, he was unsuccessful in training Ryu to use the Hadouken, which is inadvertently triggered in his body during a lesson.

- (Spain) Vega Fabio La Cerda
- Voiced by: Kaneto Shiozawa (Japan), Vic Mignogna (English ADV dub), Richard Cansino (English Animaze dub)

He is an aristocratic matador who resides in a large mansion in Barcelona, where he moonlights as a cage fighter for rich socialites. He is noted for his sadistic and ruthless personality, as he is shown drinking both his own blood and the blood of his opponents. He is also highly vain and lashes out at those who damage his face. When cage fighting, he wears a mask and wields a three-pronged clawed gauntlet. During a bullfight which Ken, Ryu, and Chun-Li attend, Vega develops an obsession for Chun-Li and plots to kill Ryu and Ken, whom he sees as rivals for her affections. Chun-Li is initially attracted to Vega, but becomes terrified of him because of his sadistic tendencies. He breaks into her hotel and uses a "love potion" drug on her; while under its influence, she watches Vega and Ken fight in a steel cage at Vega's mansion. Although Ken defeats Vega, he nearly dies from his injuries. Vega's fate is not shown, but after Guile and Nash go to investigate his mansion, it is abandoned, indicating that he is either hospitalized or fled. Unlike his in-game counterpart, Vega is not affiliated with Shadaloo or M. Bison, and the only signature move he uses is his Flying Barcelona Attack. Unlike his in-game counterpart, Vega has a surname. He is known in Japan as Balrog Fabio La Cerda.

- (United States) Balrog
- Voiced by: Tomomichi Nishimura (Japan), Werner Richmond (English ADV dub), Joe Romersa (English Animaze dub)

An executive officer at Interpol working as an informant for Shadaloo. After an Interpol conference in which Inspector Dorai is appointed to head the investigation into Shadaloo, Balrog hires Cammy and orders her to assassinate him. He tells her that Interpol secretly ordered the hit and that Dorai is a double agent who replaces the drug cartels he shuts down with a new one, with himself as its leader. Suspicions are raised when it is suggested that only a senior Interpol officer would have known of his investigations into Shadaloo. After it is revealed to Interpol Dorai is still alive, Balrog orders Cammy to finish the job. She visits Dorai in his hospital room, where she is attacked by an enraged Fei Long and eventually captured. Fei Long, with Cammy's help, discovers his secret after his cover story's inconsistencies are compared. Prior to his arrest, Cammy takes revenge against Balrog for giving her fraudulent reasons for the assassination. Unlike his in-game portrayal, Balrog is highly intelligent. Despite retaining his large build and intimidating stature, Balrog does not participate in any fights and only shows up in his boxing gear in the second version of the ending credits. His full name is Gerard Balrog in the English version and he is known as Mike Bison in the Japanese version.

- (United Kingdom) Cammy White
- Voiced by: Yōko Sasaki (Japan), Carol Matthews and Shawn Taylor (English ADV dub), Debra Jean Rogers (English Animaze dub)

A former agent of MI6 who now makes a living as a mercenary assassin. Being a devout Catholic, she always prays for forgiveness before and after each hit. She takes pride in her work, and believes that when she is hired for a job, she must cause the death of her target, to the extent that she will protect them from harm until she is ready to strike. As well, as a matter of pride, she refuses to act on false pretexts for employment. Cammy's costume is altered from her appearances in other media, as she wears a black halter top, black leather pants, and a choker decorated with a crucifix concealing a retractable metal wire, which she uses to assassinate her victims. Her original costume, with a beret and pigtails, is briefly seen during her introduction in episode 17. Despite being British, Cammy speaks with an American accent. The signature moves that she uses from the game are Cannon Spike, Spiral Arrow, Flying Neck Hunt, and an aerial version of her Spiral Arrow called the Sniping Heel.

- (Russia) Zangief
- Voiced by: Yasuro Tanaka (Japan), John Swasey (English ADV dub), Kevin Seymour (English Animaze dub)

A Russian bear wrestler who works as one of Shadaloo's strong men. He does not seem to have any particular desire or inclination to injure or kill anyone, although he will use his strength if his orders require him to do so. Unlike the games, he wears a loincloth-like shirt rather than a speedo. He also works for Shadaloo, despite being unaffiliated with them in the games. The only move he uses from the game is his Atomic Suplex.

- (United States) Sgt. Charlie Nash
- Voiced by Ryōichi Tanaka (Japan), Jay Hickman (English ADV dub), Dean Elliott (English Animaze dub)

Guile's best friend, who served alongside him in combat situations. Bison murders during the mission to rescue Ken, Ryu, and Chun-Li from Shadowlaw. Since the show was produced while Street Fighter Alpha: Warriors' Dreams was still under development, he bears no resemblance to his in-game counterpart. While Nash is known as "Charlie" in the English localization of the games, he retains his Japanese name for the English dub of the show. However, in episode 26, Guile calls him "Charlie" just before his death.

- (N/A) M. Bison
- Voiced by: Kenji Utsumi (Japan), Markham Anderson and Mike Kleinhenz (English ADV dub), Tom Wyner (English Animaze dub)

The enigmatic head of Shadaloo. In contrast to Ken and Ryu's Hadou, which is based in ki, Bison's powers are based on his rage and hatred, and are known as "Psycho Power". Using "Psycho Power" usually causes him to lose his ability to reason, as he nearly strangles Chun-Li to death, only to later regret his actions. He seeks world domination, and most of his activities are financed through underground operations, such as the Ashura syndicate. Bison has several bases throughout the world, and the final battle against him takes place in Barcelona. It is suggested that some of his actions may be the result of semi-telepathic influence originating from a silver idol shaped like an eagle's head. Unlike most characters, Bison's personality, appearance, and backstory do not deviate much from his in-game portrayals, though his uniform, which resembles the one he wore in Street Fighter II: The World Warrior, has a swapped color scheme. He is known in Japan as Vega.

- (N/A) Zoltar
- Voiced by Matsuo Matsuo (Japan), Peter Errol (English ADV dub), Milton James (English Animaze dub)

A loyal but spineless servant and chauffeur of M. Bison, who holds secondary command over Shadaloo. He appears to be one of M. Bison's top scientists, as he informs M. Bison of the details regarding the microchips used to control Ryu and Chun-Li. He usually remains at M. Bison's side, assists him in capturing evidence with a camera, and reports several major occurrences to him. Zoltar plays a similar role to Senoh from Street Fighter II: The Animated Movie, as they are both Bison's top scientists.

The other Street Fighter II playable characters (Blanka, Dee Jay, E. Honda, and T. Hawk) are absent from the series. Akuma makes several cameo appearances during crowd scenes, but is not actively involved in the story.

== Episodes ==
| No. | English dub title Japanese title | Original release date |
|---|---|---|
| 1 | "The Beginning of a Journey – Invitation from San Francisco" (旅立ち サンフランシスコからの招待状) | April 10, 1995 |
Ryu, still living in rural Japan, receives an unexpected letter from his old friend and sparring partner Ken Masters. He invites Ryu to visit him in the United States, as they have not seen each other for many years. Ryu considers the request and eventually decides to travel to see him. They meet at a San Francisco airport, where a limousine is waiting to drive them to Ken's mansion. Ryu is impressed by the riches of Ken's family. After relaxing, they go out for the night on Ken's motorcycle and bribe their way into the Mt. Fuji pub. Ken angers some soldiers after flirting with one of their girls, and a fight ensues. After the military men are defeated, their sergeant, Guile, appears.
| 2 | "The King of the Air Force – An Explosion of Menacing Military Combat" (空軍の王者 炸裂、脅威のミリタリーコンバット) | April 17, 1995 |
Guile attacks Ryu and Ken, and Ryu attempts to fight him, only to be badly beaten to the point that he is unable to leave his bed for the next few days. Afterward, Guile chides Ken for sitting on the sidelines and watching Ryu get beaten. Ken tells Guile that he and Ryu follow a code of honor permitting one-on-one combat only, and proceeds to insult Guile and his men for ganging up on Ryu. Before Guile leaves the bar with his men, he tells Ryu that "he has guts". Ken takes Ryu home and decides to take revenge on Guile at the Air Force Base the next day. Ken loses the fight against Guile, but is inspired by his "street fighting" methods. Ken then suggests to Ryu that they should travel the world to improve and strengthen their skills, with their first destination being Hong Kong.
| 3 | "Landing in Hong Kong – Sneaking In... The Invitation from Devil's Battle Cave" (香港上陸 潜入、魔闘窟への挑戦状) | April 24, 1995 |
Ryu and Ken stay at a hotel in Hong Kong and meet their tour guide, Chun-Li, who is hired to show them around the city. To her surprise, they are traveling via helicopter to Kowloon Palace, a restricted area, to find street fighters. The pilot, Tyler, initially objects to this idea, but eventually allows it. Upon arriving in Kowloon Palace, Ryu, Ken, and Chun-Li find the Devil's Battle Cage, where a martial arts tournament is taking place. Ryu enters the ring and defeats all of the opponents that Lean, the overlord of Kowloon Palace, sent to fight them. A humiliated Lean marks the outsiders for execution, forcing them to flee and fight their way out of Kowloon Palace.
| 4 | "Darkness at Kowloon Palace – Their Great Escape from the Lawless Zone" (暗黒の九龍城 無法地帯、命がけの大脱出) | May 1, 1995 |
Ryu, Ken, and Chun-Li fight their way through Kowloon Palace and reach the outer perimeters of Kowloon Palace, only for Lean to stop them. He orders his two strongest bodyguards to prevent Ryu and Ken from leaving. They defeat both, but Lean takes Chun-Li hostage. Her father Dorai, who is the police chief of Hong Kong, enters the scene with several policeman. Dorai neutralizes Lean with a shot in the head and rescues the trio from Kowloon Palace. Dorai accompanies Chun-Li, Ryu, and Ken back to their hotel and tells his daughter not to act foolish again. Chun-Li informs Ryu and Ken about the next day's plan: to visit martial arts actor Fei Long.
| 5 | "Hot Blooded Fei Long – Super Battle Action Movie" (飛龍熱血! 激写、スーパーバトルアクションムービー) | May 8, 1995 |
Ryu, Ken, and Chun-Li visit Fei Long, who is shooting a film. Fei Long is frustrated with the stuntmen hired for the fight scenes, and demands "a real challenge". He believes in "making the fight real", as opposed to the strictly choreographed fight scenes like most martial arts films. Ryu and Ken both volunteer, but only one of them can participate. Fei Long picks Ken as his opponent, and the two engage in combat. However, Fei Long and Ken take the fight too far, damaging most of the set pieces in the process. The match ends in a draw after the director of the film stops the fight.
| 6 | "Appearance of the Secret Technique – The Ki Begins to Rise, the Awakening of Hadou." (秘伝見参! 漲る気、波動の覚醒) | May 22, 1995 |
Ryu, Ken, and Chun-Li go shopping at a shopping mall. There, Ryu meets a strange old man who is seemingly dying, as he is sweating and appears to be in bad condition. Ryu says he will call an ambulance for him, but the old man insists that Ryu take him to a place of privacy. There, the old man practices a martial arts technique in front of Ryu, where he uses his ki to create a blue fireball from his hands. He swallows this fireball, and, after it explodes in his stomach, he is now in good health. Ryu wants to learn how to do this technique, and so he takes him to his shop to practice. Ryu fails to master it, but gains more knowledge about his spiritual self.
| 7 | "The Revenge of Ashura – The Attacking Muai Thai Assassin." (阿修羅の報復 襲いかかるムエタイの刺客) | June 5, 1995 |
The evil crime organization Ashura schemes to kill Chun-Li's father, Dorai, for foiling their plans. They decide to kidnap Chun-Li and use her as bait, and when she goes to a park to meet up with Ryu and Ken, an Ashura member disguised as a clown ambushes her, but Ryu and Ken arrive to save her. Chun-Li, Ryu, and Ken then head to Dorai's dojo to prevent Ashura's assassination attempt on Dorai. Chun-Li goes inside to protect her father, while Ken, Ryu, and Fei Long stay outside and battle the Ashura thugs to prevent them from reaching Dorai. They triumph, but one of Ashura's men escapes. Akuma makes a cameo appearance when the dojo is attacked.
| 8 | "Trap Prison and the Scream of Truth – Proud Ryu" (罠、牢獄、真実の叫び 誇り高きリュウ) | June 12, 1995 |
Ryu and Ken travel to Thailand in hopes of learning Muay Thai, a fighting style they encountered during their battle with Ashura's forces. Once at the airport in Bangkok, Ryu and Ken go to separate lines to obtain approval to enter Thailand legally. Donu, the Ashura thug who fled Ryu and the others thwarted their attempt to murder Dorai, disguises himself, sneaks up on Ryu, and plants heroin in his backpack as a way to get revenge. Ryu does not notice this, and is later caught and sent to prison. There, he endures brutal torture from Warden Nuchi and taunting from other prisoners. Ryu fights back against the two prisoners who are taunting him. Later, Sagat, who is "the one to fear" according to the prisoners, prepares to battle Ryu. Akuma makes a cameo appearance while waiting for his bags at the airport.
| 9 | "The Superstar of Muay Thai – The Grand Prison Battle Symphony" "Muay Thai no Kyosei – Sōzetsu Prison Battle Symphony" (ムエタイの巨星 壮絶、獄中戦交響曲) | June 19, 1995 |
Sagat and Ryu battle each other using Muay Thai. To Sagat's surprise, Ryu immediately masters Muay Thai and lands several critical blows on Sagat. The fight ends in a draw after Sagat realizes that he and Ryu are kindred fighting spirits. He vows to protect Ryu as long as he is in prison, and calls the fight off. Nuchi then insists Sagat and Ryu continue to fight each other because he had already demanded 50% percent of the betting money. Sagat refuses, and an angered Nuchi attempts to kill them both. Ryu and Sagat successfully fend off Nuchi and defeat him in combat. Later, Ken bails Ryu out of prison, although he is forbidden to leave the country until he is able to prove his innocence. Ryu and Sagat bid farewell to each other, and Ryu sets out to find the man who framed him.
| 10 | "Dark Omen – The Veiled Rightful Ruler" (暗黒の予兆 ベールに包まれた真の君臨者) | June 26, 1995 |
Ryu and Ken learn that Donu had framed Ryu, and follow him to Ashura's secret hideout, where they defeat Donu and the other Ashura members. The pair bring them into custody and Ryu is subsequently acquitted. As they leave the station, a sniper fires at them. Ryu and Ken climb atop the sniper's vehicle as it tries to escape, arriving at another secret hideout of Ashura, which appears to be their main headquarters. Zochi, the kingpin of Ashura, quickly discovers Ryu and Ken and beats them. Zochi, realizing torture will not make Ryu and Ken tell him who they are "supposedly" working for, ties Ryu to a chair and prepares to cut his left arm off with his chainsaw to add to his "collection" of left arms. Just as Zochi is about to do so, Dorai and the rest of the Hong Kong police force arrive, thanks to the tracker Dorai planted on Soong. Ryu and Ken defeat Zochi and the other Ashura members. Sagat is freed from prison in light of new evidence proving his innocence. Sagat tells Ryu that if he wishes to learn about Hadou, he should travel to India, where a monk named Dhalsim lives.
| 11 | "Visitation of the Beasts – The Fierce, Holy Monk Advice to Young Warriors" (野獣来訪 聖なる荒法師、若武者への忠告) | July 3, 1995 |
Ryu and Ken visit India to learn about Hadou from the monk Dhalsim, who lives in northern India. They fight off a gang of thugs who want to destroy Dr. Hanna's small hospital, as it is built on land that they wish to use for themselves, which she built as a refuge for the impoverished population of Calcutta. Ken makes a phone call to his father, asking him to purchase Dr. Hanna's hospital and turn it into a much larger, fully functioning hospital so she is never harassed or threatened again. Ryu and Ken soon arrive in Dhalsim's village, but he refuses to teach them the ways of Hadou, because he believes them to be "beasts with an aggressive spirit", and thus unworthy to be taught Hadou. Ryu and Ken befriend the villagers to impress Dhalsim and motivate him to teach them Hadou. Dhalsim shows Ryu and Ken the Cave of Ancients, telling them never to go in there, as there is a terrible monster inside. Meanwhile, four criminals enter the cave, intent on plundering its treasure.
| 12 | "The Deadly Phantom Faceoff – The Battle Spirit Hidden Between Body and Soul" (赤白の闘神 幻の真剣勝負) | July 10, 1995 |
Dhalsim and the villagers are taken hostage by two of the criminals, with the other two having died inside the cave after failing to reach the treasure. They order Ryu and Ken to enter the cave and retrieve the treasure, threatening to massacre the entire village if they do not succeed. Inside, they are forced to face each other in combat, but are unaware that the "monster" they are fighting is merely a reflection of their innermost being. Ryu and Ken, after suffering serious injuries from the fight, realize that they are fighting each other, causing the illusion to disappear. Ryu and Ken emerge from the cave and hand the treasure over to the criminals, who then try to kill them for outliving their "usefulness", although Dhalsim paralyzes them. He then heals Ryu's and Ken's injuries and agrees to teach them the ways of Hadou.
| 13 | "The Legend of Hadou Ken – All Creation, Source of the Energy" (森羅万象の気 波動拳伝説) | July 17, 1995 |
Dhalsim attempts to teach Ryu and Ken how to use Hadou. Although Ryu is successful in performing the technique, he is unable to control his newfound powers and fears they could kill others. Ryu goes to the Cave of the Ancients to perfect his use of the Hadouken. In the cave, he fights an imaginary Guile, who he says helped him realize "just how arrogant we really were". Soon afterward, he fights an imaginary Dhalsim, since imagining opponents helps him focus on where to shoot the Hadouken. After finishing his training, Ryu and Ken leave India to go to Spain, since Dorai was invited to Barcelona to receive an award for shutting down the Ashura crime syndicate. Chun-Li invites Ryu and Ken to come as well, and so they do.
| 14 | "The Bloodthirsty Prince – A Lust for Beauty and a Love Potion for Chun Li" (血に飢えた貴公子 美への執着、春麗への媚薬) | July 24, 1995 |
Matador Vega enters a bullfighting arena to show off his skills. Vega notices Chun-Li and develops an attraction to her. He gives her a rose before fighting the bull, declaring that he will defeat the bull in her honor. Vega is victorious and presents Chun-Li with the bull's ear as proof of his victory. Chun-Li becomes uneasy when around Vega after this incident. Ryu, Ken, and Chun-Li encounter Vega several times outside of the bullfighting arena, and each time Vega shows more and more affection towards Chun-Li. In the middle of the night, as Chun-Li, Ryu, and Ken are sleeping, Vega sneaks into Chun-Li's hotel room and kisses her. He then casts a love potion over her, causing her to only focus on him each time she sees him. Vega escapes the room just as Ryu, Ken, and Chun-Li wake up and Ken notices that someone is there.
| 15 | "Clash of the Titans – Mortal Combat for Pride, Life, and Cinderella" (両雄激突 プライドと命とシンデレラを賭けた死闘) | July 31, 1995 |
Vega invites Ken, Ryu, and Chun-Li to a party, although Ken is unaware that Vega sent the letter. Ken and Chun-Li go to the party, while Ryu stays behind at the hotel to practice his Hadouken. After arriving at the party, Chun-Li drifts off into a daze, and Ken, realizing that Vega is in the steel cage in the middle of the room where the party is being held, accepts Vega's challenge.
| 16 | "The Unveiled Ruler – The Rampage of the fearful Thirst for Conquest Begins" (ベールをぬいだ君臨者 暴走を始めた恐るべき征服欲) | August 7, 1995 |
The fight between Ken and Vega continues. Vega has the advantage, breaking both of Ken's feet and causing him to bleed. Despite this, Ken survives and scores several hits on Vega, including knocking his mask off, before Vega wears him down. Vega jumps onto the chandelier and prepares to finish him off, while Ken decides to use his ultimate attack, the Shoryuken, on him.
| 17 | "Shudder! The Despot's Commander – Infiltration Strategem – An Approaching Crisis" (戦慄、暴君の司令 忍び寄る策謀、迫り来る危機) | August 14, 1995 |
Ken and Vega's battle reaches its end as Ken uses the Shoryuken to knock Vega into the chandelier above. Chun-Li enters the cage as Vega's love potion wears off and rushes to Ken's aid. Vega is enraged after seeing Chun-Li embrace Ken and drops down from the chandelier to attack them. However, Ken catches Vega on his back as Bison, impressed with his skills, orders his assistant Zoltar to get his doctors to work on his recovery and bring him to his villa. Ryu continues to practice the Hadouken at the beach by the hotel he is staying in as Ken and Vega enter recovery. Chun-Li, finding this suspicious, questions Bison's doctors. Bison then enters the room and tries to kidnap her.
| 18 | "The Beautiful Assassin – Green Eyes, Terror of the Cross" (美しき暗殺者 緑色の瞳、十字架の恐怖) | August 21, 1995 |
Bison and Chun-Li fight. Just as she is about to flee, he teleports in front of her and strangles her until she loses consciousness. Bison, realizing he went berserk with his Psycho Power, tells his assistant, Zoltar, to bring Chun-Li and Ken to his villa. Meanwhile, the assassin Cammy White, who Interpol infiltrator and Shadowlaw double agent Balrog hired to kill Dorai because of his investigation into Shadowlaw, enters her hotel room next to where Dorai is staying. The alibi given to Cammy was that Dorai supposedly set up a new drug syndicate each time he smashed one, with himself as boss of those drug syndicates. As well, the Chief of Interpol, Barrac, agreed to this, but said that it had to be kept secret. Cammy prepares to kill Dorai.
| 19 | "Special Orders to Iron Men – The Mightiest Rescuers Launch into the Sheltering Skies" (鉄人への特命 救出の空に発つ最強の助っ人) | August 28, 1995 |
Bison calls Mr. Masters, Ken's father to inform him that he has kidnapped him and demands a $1,000,000,000 ransom in exchange for his freedom. The money was needed because it would reimburse Bison and Shadowlaw for the money they lost after Dorai shut down Ashura. In response, Mr. Masters sends Guile and his friend Nash to rescue Ken from Bison. Guile is given a picture of Ken with Ryu and recognizes them. After being briefed by Mr. Masters's friend from college, Guile and Nash head to Spain to rescue Ken from Bison. Meanwhile, Cammy attacks Dorai as Shadowlaw wrestler Zangief, who Bison sent to take Ryu to Bison's headquarters, attacks him.
| 20 | "Unknown Explosive Force – The Full Extent of Unbelievable Power" (秘められた爆発力 渾身に満ちるとてつもないパワー) | September 4, 1995 |
Ryu and Zangief fight on the beach, but Zangief, with help from a Shadowlaw driver, knocks Ryu out and puts him in a truck as Guile and Nash land nearby. However, Zangief and the Shadowlaw driver escape with Ryu before Guile and Nash can confront them. Guile and Nash search the castle that Vega and Ken were in before Bison's physicians work on them to see if they can find Ken. Meanwhile, Ryu and Bison fight after he awakens to find himself in Shadowlaw's headquarters. Bison taunts Ryu into using the Hadouken and uses his Psycho Power to cause Ryu to lose control of it. The Hadouken explodes, and this, combined with the energy of Bison's Psycho Power, knocks Ryu unconscious.
| 21 | "Compulsion Towards Vengeance – Cyberchip – The Challenge to Mind Control" (服従への強制 サイバーチップ、脳支配への挑戦) | September 11, 1995 |
Bison plants a cyber chip onto Ryu's forehead. Zoltar created the chip to recruit Shadowlaw warriors for Bison, and it has the ability to control a subject's higher brain functions. Therefore, as long as the cyber chip is on their forehead, Bison can control them at will, as Zoltar demonstrates by having a test subject bang his head against the wall and kill himself. With Ryu under Bison's control and Ken unconscious and chained to a bed, Guile and Nash hurry to rescue them from Bison. Meanwhile, Fei Long learns of Dorai's supposed death and rushes to the hospital to see him, as he was in Barcelona to film a movie there. There, Interpol Chief Barrac greets him and explains the situation to Fei Long. He wishes to help Barrac protect Dorai from future assassination attempts since he is still alive.
| 22 | "Rising Dragon Into The Sky – The Extremes of Rage – Awakening of Hadou" (昇龍、空へ 怒りの絶頂、目覚める波動) | September 18, 1995 |
Ken is continually having nightmares of Bison strangling Chun-Li, which begins to awaken his ki and his ability to tap into Hadou. He awakens, although weaker than ever. He gradually summons the Hadou Shoryuken and frees himself from the chains, then busts a hole in the ceiling to escape. He makes his way deeper into the fortress in hopes of finding Ryu and Chun-Li.
| 23 | "The Icy Light of Their Eyes – Heroes Possessed by Evil" (凍りついた眼光 悪魔に魅入られた勇者) | October 16, 1995 |
The episode starts with a recap of the events that occurred since Ryu and Ken journeyed to Barcelona. After the recap, Ken makes his way to the main room of the headquarters, where he is separated from Chun-Li and Ryu via a wall. Balrog summons Cammy to the hospital, as Dorai had survived her assassination attempt and he wants him dead. Cammy begins to have suspicions about Balrog, but continues to follow his orders. Ken approaches a window to a room in which he sees Chun-Li, who also has a cyber chip implanted on her forehead, strangling a Shadowlaw guard.
| 24 | "Nightmare Reunion – An Anguished Cry, A Mind Sealed Away" (悪夢の再会 悲痛の呼び掛け、閉ざされた意識) | October 23, 1995 |
Ken watches as Chun-Li breaks the guard's neck. Ryu then enters, now under Bison's control via the cyber chip, and attacks Ken, who realizes that something is wrong with Ryu. Bison then orders Ryu to focus his ki to do the Hadouken. Ryu complies and charges his ki. Meanwhile, Guile and Nash infiltrate the fortress to try and rescue Ken, Ryu, and Chun-Li from Bison. Ken summons enough rage to use the Hadou Shoryu and break the wall between him and Ryu. He tries to convince Ryu to come with him, but Ryu doesn't answer.
| 25 | "Fight to the Finish (Round One) – The Grand Triple Battle Command" (死闘 <第一章> 壮絶、トリプルバトルコマンド) | October 30, 1995 |
Ryu and Ken fight each other, and Ryu easily overpowers Ken as he refuses to fight his best friend. However, Ken hits Ryu in self-defense, and Bison tells Ken that he and Ryu were born to fight each other. As the fight goes on, Ken unsuccessfully tries to free Ryu from Bison's control. Meanwhile, Cammy enters Dorai's hospital room and attempts to make a final assassination attempt on him, but Fei Long intercepts her and talks with her before they battle for Dorai's life. Guile and Nash, having successfully infiltrated Shadowlaw's fortress, go their separate ways to find Shadowlaw's captives. Guile runs into Zangief and begins to fight him.
| 26 | "Fight to the Finish (Round Two) – The Final Moments of an Exhausted True Friend" (死闘 <第二章> 力尽きゆく親友の断末魔) | November 6, 1995 |
The fights between Guile and Zangief and Fei Long and Cammy continue, with Fei Long determined to protect Dorai from Cammy. Meanwhile, Ryu and Ken continue their fight as Ken continues to try to convince Ryu to turn back to normal. Nash fights into the control room of the fortress, where he finds Bison. He shoots at Bison, who uses his Psycho Power to deflect it, then chokes Nash to death.
| 27 | "Fight to the Finish (Round Three) – Critical Point – The Limits of the Smashing Hadou Energy" (死闘 <第三章> 臨界点、激突する波動エネルギーの極限) | November 13, 1995 |
Guile makes his way into the control room and finds Nash dead. After realizing that Bison had killed him, Guile attacks Bison in extreme rage. Bison uses his Psycho Power to attack Guile, briefly incapacitating him. Meanwhile, Fei Long and Cammy continue to fight for the life of Dorai, although Fei Long reveals to Cammy that Shadowlaw sent her to kill Dorai because he kept foiling their plans. Cammy goes to the hotel room where Balrog is staying and questions his motives. He reveals to her that he set her up and points a gun at her. Just as he is about to kill her, Fei Long and Barrac intervene. Barrac says Balrog is under arrest, but before he is arrested, Cammy attacks Balrog for tricking her and nearly kills him. She decides to hand him over to Fei Long and thanks him for telling her the truth.
| 28 | "Fight to the Finish (Round Four) – Master Bison – The Overwhelming Destructive Power" (死闘 <第四章> 君臨者ベガ、その圧倒的破壊力) | November 20, 1995 |
Ryu and Ken finish their fight by using the Hadou Shoryu and the Hadouken against each other. The resulting blast of energy knocks the cyber chip off of Ryu, returning him to normal. Guile goes to confront Bison, who sends the brainwashed Chun-Li to fight him. Ryu and Ken meet up with Guile and Chun-Li in the control room of the fortress. Their reunion is short-lived, however, as Bison's eagle head transports Guile and Chun-Li outside to continue their battle. It also teleports Ryu, Ken, and Bison into the focal point of the universe where all of its power flows.
| 29 | "Fight to the Finish (Final Round) – The Final Battle, Risking All of Body and Soul" (死闘完結 全身全霊をかけたファイナルバトル) | November 27, 1995 |
Guile and Chun-Li battle outside, while Ryu, Ken, and Bison battle in the focal point of the universe, which is revealed to be another dimension that Bison's eagle had sent them to. Ryu and Ken seem outmatched because of Bison's Psycho Power and Guile is losing to Chun-Li, as the cyber chip has made her more powerful and he is reluctant to fight out of fear of harming her. Bison overpowers Ryu and Ken and wounds them, but they find the strength to carry on thanks to their Hadou powers. Ken uses the Hadou Shoryuken against Bison, which weakens him and knocks the cyber chip off of Chun-Li, allowing Ryu to finish him off. Afterward, Ryu and Ken head back to America, then Ryu sails to an unknown location.

== Music ==
Japanese

- Opening Themes
1. "Kaze Fuiteru" by Yuki Kuroda (eps 1–19)
2. "Ima, ashita no tame ni" by Shuji Honda (eps 20–29)
- Ending Themes
1. "Cry" by Yuki Kuroda (eps 1–19)
2. "Lonely Baby" by Shuji Honda (eps. 20–29)

The American and Australian release of the Manga/Animaze English dub uses untitled instrumental theme music by Mike Egan composed specifically for the dub. The ADV Films version kept the original Japanese intro and outro themes.

== Development ==
The work on the anime was influenced by Street Fighter II: The Animated Movie.

== Home video releases ==
Two English adaptations of the series were produced. The first one was by the dubbing group Animaze and Manga Entertainment in 1996, and was released in Australia and North America as a series of VHS tapes in 1997–1998. Each tape included three episodes, and was released in both a dubbed version and a subtitled version (which was priced 5 US dollars more than the dubbed version). The US CLV LaserDisc was released between March and June 1998 on 10 discs. In 1997, ADV Films produced a second English dub exclusively for the UK market, also released on VHS. The Animaze/Manga dub had a DVD release on 29 April 2003 in a four disc set in North America and was then released on DVD in Australia.

In Japan, the anime was released via DVD box set on July 15, 2009.

North American LaserDisc releases
| Vol. # | Title | Release Date | Discs / Sides | Episode Count |
| 1 | Street Fighter 2 TV #1: Ep. 1–3; The Beginning of a Journey | Mar 10, 1998 | 1 / 2 | 3 |
| 2 | Street Fighter 2 TV #2: Ep. 4–6; Darkness at Kowloon Palace | Mar 10, 1998 | 1 / 2 | 3 |
| 3 | Street Fighter 2 TV #3: Ep. 7–9; The Revenge of Ashura | Mar 24, 1998 | 1 / 2 | 3 |
| 4 | Street Fighter 2 TV #4: Ep. 10–12; Dark Omen | Mar 24, 1998 | 1 / 2 | 3 |
| 5 | Street Fighter 2 TV #5: Ep. 13–15; The Legend of Hadou Ken | Apr 24, 1998 | 1 / 2 | 3 |
| 6 | Street Fighter 2 TV #6: Ep. 16–18; The Unveiled Ruler | 28 Apr 1998 | 1 / 2 | 3 |
| 7 | Street Fighter 2 TV #7: Ep. 19–21; Special Orders to the Iron Men | May 26, 1998 | 1 / 2 | 3 |
| 8 | Street Fighter 2 TV #8: Ep. 22–24; Rising Dragon, Into the Sky | May 26, 1998 | 1 / 2 | 3 |
| 9 | Street Fighter 2 TV #9: Ep. 25–27; Fight To The Finish (Round One) | Jun 30, 1998 | 1 / 2 | 3 |
| 10 | Street Fighter 2 TV #10: Ep. 28–29; Fight To The Finish (Final Round) | Jun 30, 1998 | 1 / 1 | 2 |
