= Sorcerer on the Rocks =

Japanese original video animation (OVA) series

妖術者 オンザロック (Mahotsukai o za Rokkus)
- Genre: Adventure, Fantasy, Comedy
- Original video animation
- Directed by: Kazuhiro Ozawa
- Studio: Daume
- Licensed by: US: ADV Films
- Released: August 21, 1999 – September 21, 1999
- Runtime: 25 minutes (each)
- Episodes: 2
- Spin-off of
- Sorcerer Hunters

Sorcerer on the Rocks (妖術者 オンザロック, Mahotsukai on za Rokkus) also known as Chivas 1-2-3 (シーバス1-2-3, Chivas 1-2-3) is a Japanese animated television series. It is a spin-off of the Japanese manga series Sorcerer Hunters. Satoru Akahori and Miku Yuki published the original story in MediaWorks' Monthly Dengeki Comic Gao!

== Synopsis ==
In a world of magic and mystery, a group of noble warriors, known as the Sorcerer Hunters, dedicate their lives to upholding justice and ridding the kingdom of tyrannical sorcerers and demonic creatures.

This story follows a cold-hearted sorcerer named Shibas Scotch, also known as Chivas, who works as a bounty hunter to eliminate powerful sorcerers and malevolent monsters for a fee.

One day, Shibas is hired by Count Cuttlefish to eliminate an evil monster terrorizing a nearby village. However, Shibas fails to defeat the creature and is forced to transfer his consciousness into the body of his servant, a beautiful young woman named Gin Fizz.

== Episodes ==
1. My Master is a Real Wretch
2. Even the Pure Maiden is a Real Wretch

== Characters ==
As listed in the DVD:

Shibas (Chivas) Scotch

Voiced by: Kazuki Yao (Japanese); Jay Hickman (English)

Gin Fizz

Voiced by: Yuka Imai (Japanese); Monica Rial (English)

Shibas (Chivas) Fizz

Voiced by: Chinami Nishimura (Japanese); Monica Rial (English)

Kiss the werewolf

Voiced by: Chinami Nishimura (Japanese); Hilary Haag (English)

Gemini

Voiced by: Nobutoshi Hayashi (Japanese); Brett Weaver (English)

Million Dollar

Voiced by: Fujiko Takimoto (Japanese); Emily Carter (English)

Count Cuttlefish

Voiced by: Katsutoshi Hoki (Japanese); John Swasey (English)

Meru

Voiced by: Yuri Shiratori (Japanese); Kira Vincent-Davis (English)

Taru

Voiced by: Ayako Kawasumi (Japanese); Kira Vincent-Davis (English)

Icarus

Voiced by: Jurota Kosugi (Japanese); Mike Kleinhenz (English)

== Opening and Ending ==
The Opening is a Narration.

Voiced by: Jurota Kosugi (Japanese); Mike Kleinhenz (English)

The Ending is "My First WONDER SENSATION"

Lyrics by Miki Takino
Music by Nobuo Ito
Song by Anri Minowa
