= Samurai Gun =

Japanese manga and anime series

- First tankōbon volume cover

サムライガン (Samurai Gan)
- Genre: Alternate history; Samurai; Steampunk
- Manga
- Written by: Kazuhiro Kumagai
- Published by: Shueisha
- Magazine: Weekly Young Jump; Young Jump Zōkan Mankaku; Bessatsu Young Jump
- Original run: 1997 – 2002
- Volumes: 7
- Manga

Samurai Gun Gekkō
- Written by: Kazuhiro Kumagai
- Published by: Shueisha
- Magazine: Ultra Jump
- Original run: October 2000 – December 2003
- Volumes: 4
- Anime television series
- Directed by: Kazuhito Kikuchi
- Produced by: John Ledford; Kazuo Jibuki; Yuji Suzuki
- Written by: Hideki Sonoda
- Music by: Akifumi Tada
- Studio: Studio Egg
- Licensed by: AUS: Madman Entertainment; NA: ADV Films; UK: ADV Films
- Original network: TV Asahi
- English network: NA: Anime Network
- Original run: October 5, 2004 – December 14, 2004
- Episodes: 13
- icon

Samurai Gun (Japanese: サムライガン, Hepburn: Samurai Gan) is a Japanese manga series written and illustrated by Kazuhiro Kumagai. It was serialized across three Shueisha's seinen manga magazines from 1997 to 2002: Weekly Young Jump, Young Jump Zōkan Mankaku and Bessatsu Young Jump. Its chapters were collected in seven tankōbon volumes. Another series, Samurai Gun Gekkō, was serialized in Ultra Jump from 2000 to 2003. A 13-episode anime television series, directed by Kazuhito Kikuchi and animated by Studio Egg, was broadcast in 2004. The anime series was licensed in North America by ADV Films, which co-financed the series' production.

== Plot ==
It is the beginning of the Industrial Revolution, and feudal Japan is in turmoil. The ruling Shogun are wielding their abusive powers to instill fear and dominance over their oppressed subjects. Beatings, imprisonment, rape, and even murder are the adopted tactics chosen to maintain their reign. A group of samurai have banded together to end the bloodshed. With the development of new weapons and new technology, this group of fighters has both the will and the equipment to fight back. Ichimatsu, one of the samurai fighters, works at a local tavern as a cover for his real job. By the dark of night he doles out some big-time, gun-barrel justice under the name "Samurai Gun".

== Characters ==
Ichimatsu
Voiced by: Showtaro Morikubo (Japanese); Illich Guardiola (English)
One of the samurai guns.
Daimon
Voiced by: Katsuyuki Konishi (Japanese); Ty Mahany (English)
Another samurai gun who works many missions with Ichimatsu. His cover during the day is a teacher, and he owes a large tab to the tavern owner Ichimatsu works for.
Kurenai
Voiced by: Kyōko Hikami (Japanese); Christine Auten (English)
Ohana
Voiced by: Minori Chihara (Japanese); Shelley Calene-Black (English)
Shunkai Matsuzaki
Voiced by: Kazuya Nakai (Japanese); Victor Carsrud (English)

== Media ==
=== Manga ===
Written and illustrated by Kazuhiro Kumagai, Samurai Gun was serialized across three Shueisha's seinen manga magazines from 1997 to 2002: Weekly Young Jump, Young Jump Zōkan Mankaku and Bessatsu Young Jump. Shueisha collected its chapters in seven tankōbon volumes; the first six volumes were published from June 19, 1998, to October 18, 2002, and the seventh volume was released two years later on October 19, 2004.

Another series, titled Samurai Gun Gekkō (サムライガン月光, Samurai Gan Gekkō; "Samurai Gun Moonlight"), was serialized in Ultra Jump from the October 2000 to the December 2003 issues. Its chapters were collected in four tankōbon volumes, released from July 19, 2001, to February 19, 2004.

=== Anime ===
A 13-episode anime television series, produced by Avex Mode and ADV Films, animated by Studio Egg, directed by Kazuhito Kikuchi, with series composition by Hideki Sonoda, was broadcast on TV Asahi from October 5 to December 14, 2004; (Note: TV Asahi listed the air dates for the series on Monday at 27:12, which is effectively Tuesday at 3:12 a.m. JST.) the last two episodes aired as a single hour-long finale, and the 13th episode did not air on the network during the series' run. The opening theme is "Samurai Crew" by ZZ, while the first ending theme is "Ienai Kotoba" (いえないコトバ; "Unspeakable Words") by Aiko Kayō and the second ending theme is "Zutto... Issho" (ずっと…一緒; "Forever…Together") by Minori Chihara.

The series was licensed in North America and the United Kingdom by ADV Films; in North America, the series was released on four DVDs from August 16, 2005, to February 14, 2006, while in the United Kingdom the four DVDs were released from October 16, 2006, to April 16, 2007. A "Complete Collection" volume was released in North America on February 20, 2007.

In Australia and New Zealand, the series was licensed by Madman Entertainment, who released the series on four DVDs from December 7, 2005, to March 29, 2006; a "Complete Collection" volume was released on May 2, 2007.

==== Episodes ====
No.	Original English title / ADV Films title Original Japanese title	Original airdate
1	"The Man with the Gun / The Man with the Samurai Gun"; Transliteration: "Samurai Juu o Motsu Otoko" (Japanese: 侍銃を持つ男)	October 5, 2004
2	"The Steamengines / Experimental Railroad"; Transliteration: "Jikken Tetsudou" (Japanese: 実験鉄道)	October 12, 2004
3	"Still Life in Mobile Homes / The Sleeping Flower"; Transliteration: "Nemureru Hana" (Japanese: 眠れる花)	October 19, 2004
4	"Inazuma"; Transliteration: "Inazuma" (Japanese: 稲妻)	October 26, 2004
5	"Scary Monsters / Natural Enemies"; Transliteration: "Tenteki" (Japanese: 天敵)	November 2, 2004
6	"Flesh and Blood / Blood and Song"; Transliteration: "Chi to Uta" (Japanese: 血と歌)	November 9, 2004
7	"Are You Receiving Me? / Daimon at the Front Lines"; Transliteration: "Daimon Sensen" (Japanese: 代門戦線)	November 16, 2004
8	"Wild Ambitions / Valley of Ambition"; Transliteration: "Yabou no Tani" (Japanese: 野望の谷)	November 23, 2004
9	"Run Beach Run / Running on the Shoreline"; Transliteration: "Mizugiwa o Hashiru" (Japanese: 水際を走る)	November 30, 2004
10	"In Every Dreamhome Heartache / A Doll's House"; Transliteration: "Ningyou no Ie" (Japanese: 人形の家)	December 7, 2004
11	"For Your Pleasure / Blood and Amusement"; Transliteration: "Chi to Nagusami" (Japanese: 血と慰み)	December 14, 2004
12	"Substance"; Transliteration: "Jittai" (Japanese: 実体)	December 14, 2004
13	"Two Tribes / The Inerasable Past"; Transliteration: "Taijisuru Ketsuzoku" (Japanese: 対峙する血族)	Unaired
It takes place between episodes 8 and 9.
