= Christine Auten =

American voice actress

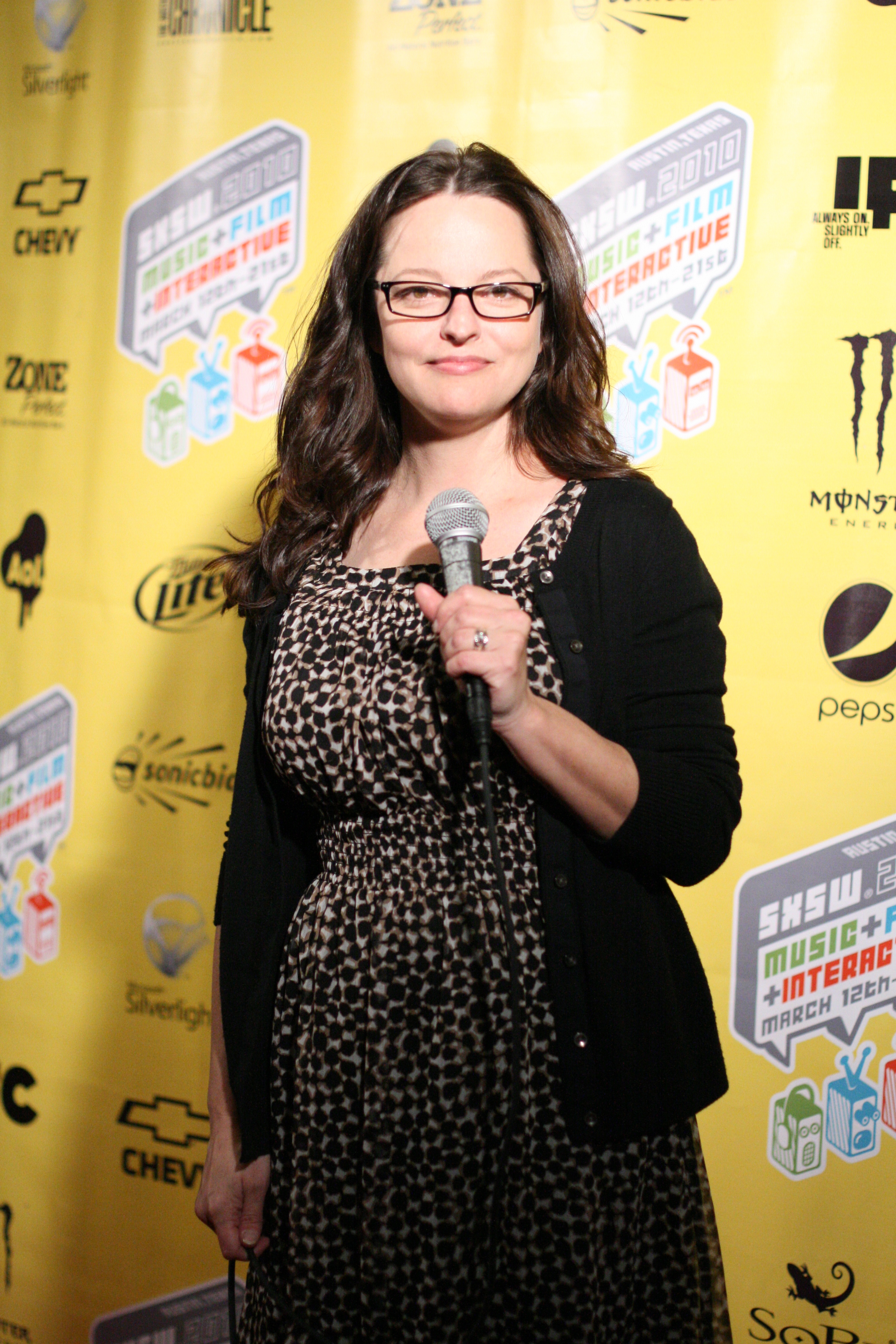
- Auten in 2010
- Other names: Christine M. Auten; Chris Auten; Chris M. Auten
- Occupations: Voice actress; ADR director; scriptwriter; producer
- Years active: 1999–present
- Spouse: Andrew Auten (m. 1997)
- Website: christineauten.com

Christine Auten is an American voice actress, ADR director, and ADR scriptwriter.

Auten performs the voice of Esdeath, the main antagonist from the popular anime Akame ga Kill, Mesousa from Pani Poni Dash, Kurenai from Samurai Gun, Yufan Xia from Full Metal Panic: The Second Raid, Priscilla Asagiri from Bubblegum Crisis Tokyo 2040, and Sakaki from Azumanga Daioh.

== Personal life ==
As of 2017, she lives in Austin, Texas with her husband Andrew Auten.

== Filmography ==
=== Anime ===
Year	Title	Role	Notes	Source
1998	Sorcerous Stabber Orphen	Azalie Cait Sith		
1999	Bubblegum Crisis Tokyo 2040	Priscilla Asagiri		
2004	Azumanga Daioh	Sakaki		
2004	Fullmetal Alchemist	Izumi Curtis	also Brotherhood	
2005	Ghost Stories	Keiichiro Miyanoshita, Innkeeper		
2005	Samurai Gun	Kurenai		
2006	Super Dimension Fortress Macross	Claudia LaSalle		
2006	Full Metal Panic!	Yufan Xia	season 2	
2006	Pani Poni Dash	Mesousa		
2007	Air Gear	Rika Noyamano		
2007	Utawarerumono	Sopoku	ADR Director	
2008	Claymore	Teresa		
2008	Ouran High School Host Club	Fuyumi Otori		
2010	Eden of the East	Kuroha "Diana" Shiratori		
2010	Sekirei series	Karasuba	also season 2	
2015	Akame ga Kill	Esdeath		
2015	Muv-Luv Alternative: Total Eclipse	Cryska Barchenowa		
2018	Made in Abyss	Ozen		
2020	Wasteful Days of High School Girls	Majime's Mom		
2021	Hero Mask	Anna	Sentai Filmworks dub	
2021	Dororo	Ohagi		
2022	Shenmue	Xiuying Hong / Lishao Tao		
2024	The Dangers in My Heart	Yamada's Mother		

=== Films ===
Year	Title	Role	Notes	Source
2004	Lady Death: The Motion Picture	Lady Death/Hope		
2011	Eden of the East Movie I: The King of Eden	Kuroha "Diana" Shiratori		
2021	Venus Wars	Miranda	Sentai Filmworks dub	
