= Chinami Nishimura (voice actress) =

Japanese voice actress (born 1970)

- 西村 ちなみ
- Born: November 18, 1970 (age 55); Chiba Prefecture, Japan
- Occupation: Voice actress
- Years active: 1992–present
- Agent: 81 Produce
- Children: 2

Chinami Nishimura (西村 ちなみ, Nishimura Chinami; born November 18, 1970) is a Japanese voice actress from Chiba Prefecture, and affiliated with 81 Produce. Her major roles include Fake Yuna and Miki Shiratori in Galaxy Fraulein Yuna, Neko Musume in GeGeGe no Kitaro, Junsa (Officer Jenny) in Pokémon, Reika Aoki/Cure Beauty in Smile PreCure!, Yu Fua in Duel Masters, Kiyone Kotetsu in Bleach, and President Aria Pokoteng in Aria. In video games, she voices Kanna in the Air visual novel, and Cheryl in Arc the Lad III.

== Filmography ==
=== Anime ===
List of voice performances in anime
Year	Title	Role	Notes	Source
1992	Crayon Shin-chan	Mochida		
1994	Montana Jones	Patomi		
1994	Chō Kuse ni Narisō	Nagisa Shiratori / Nagisa Ootori	Debut major role	
1994	Magic Knight Rayearth	Lady Aska		
1995	Iczer Girl Iczelion	Kiiro Iijima	OVA	
1995	Wedding Peach	Ranpo		
1995	Battle Skipper	Saori Tachibana	OVA	
1995	Mama Loves the Poyopoyo-Saurus	Akiko		
1995–97	Galaxy Fräulein Yuna series	Fake Yuna, Miki Shiratori		
1995	Mojacko	Sharyi		
1996	Famous Dog Lassie	Chris		
1996	GeGeGe no Kitaro	Neko Musume	4th TV series	
1996–97	Bakusō Kyōdai Let's & Go!!	Jun Sagami		
1996	Mobile Suit Gundam: The 08th MS Team	Kiki Rosita	OVA	
1996	Sailor Moon Sailor Stars	Misa	Ep. 185	
1996	Violinist of Hameln	Cornet		
1996	Kiko-chan's Smile	Takeshi		
1997	Bakusō Kyōdai Let's & Go!! WGP	Aleksei Demitorivich Fadie (FOX 2)		
1997	Pokémon	Junsa (Officer Jenny), Waninoko/Totodile		
1997	Revolutionary Girl Utena	Mari Hozumi	Ep. 18	
1997	Maze	Randy		
1997	Kindaichi Case Files	Tatsumi Moegi, Masumi Takamori, Tomomi Wada, Akane Aizawa		
1997	Ninpen Manmaru	Pepin ピピン		
1998	All Purpose Cultural Cat Girl Nuku Nuku	Noriko Ishiyama, Shiho		
1998	Cyber Team in Akihabara	Uzura Kitaurawa		
1998	Virgin Fleet	Komachi Kusatsuzuki	OVA	
1998	Shadow Skill: Eigi	Kaira La Luka		
1998	Flint the Time Detective	Puu-chan		
1998	Ojarumaru	Komachi, Ojarumaru (season 4 onwards)		
1999	Jubei-chan series	Ozaru	Also sequel in 2004	
1999	Sorcerer on the Rocks	Kiss, Chivas Fizz	OVA	
1999	Steel Angel Kurumi	Sumako		
1999	Seraphim Call	Sakura Murasame		
1999	Blue Gender	Elena		
1999	Karakurizōshi Ayatsuri Sakon	Sayoko Fukami		
1999	Di Gi Charat	Rod Young		
2000	Mon Colle Knights	Tango Dancing Black Cat		
2000	Da! Da! Da!	Momoka Hanakomachi		
2000	Gate Keepers	Feng Fei Ling		
2000	Taro the Space Alien	Kyoko Asada		
2000	Hamtaro	Kurumi Kurihara		
2000	Brigadoon: Marin & Melan	A-ko Saenai, Lala		
2000	Inuyasha	Botan		
2001	Star Ocean EX	Green Demon		
2001	A Little Snow Fairy Sugar	Greta		
2002	Please Teacher!	Nacchan		
2002	Ojamajo Doremi	Orihime		
2002	Aquarian Age: Sign for Evolution	Rumiko Sakamoto		
2002	Wagamama Fairy: Mirumo de Pon!	Rigeru		
2002	Shrine of the Morning Mist	Kukuri Shirayama		
2002	Dragon Drive	Chibisuke		
2002–06	UFO Ultramaiden Valkyrie	Hydra		
2002	Monkey Typhoon	Tamara		
2002–08	Duel Masters	Yu Fua		
2002	Pocket Monsters Advanced Generation	Junsa, Achamo, Wakashamo, others		
2003–2006	Kaleido Star series	Mia Guillem		
2003	Tank Knights Fortress	Daughter Potorisu 娘ポトリス		
2003	Di Gi Charat Nyo!ょ	Rod P ロドP		
2003	Zatch Bell!	Koko		
2003	Ultra Maniac	Luna		
2003	Please Twins!	Nacchan		
2004	Sgt. Frog	Chiruyo Tsukigami		
2004	Kannazuki no Miko	Otowa 乙羽		
2005	Bleach	Kiyone Kotetsu		
2005	Air	Kanna		
2005	Mushiking: The King of Beetles	Myrtle ミルテ		
2005	Zoids Genesis	Rene ルネ		
2005–08	Aria series	President Aria Pokoteng		
2006	Pokémon Diamond & Pearl	Junsa, Pachirisu, Dokukeiru		
2006	Ghost Slayers Ayashi	Outa		
2007	GeGeGe no Kitaro	Mayumi	5th TV series	
2009	Kaidan Restaurant	Straw-chan		
2010	Pokémon: Best Wishes	Hatobo, Mamepato, Eevee, others		
2011	Digimon Fusion	Lopmon, Bagumon		
2012	Smile Pretty Cure!	Reika Aoki (Cure Beauty)		
2013	Tamayura: More Aggressive	Mutsuko Shimokamiyama		
2017	Aikatsu Stars!	Mrs. Kasumi	Ep. 75	
2023	The Dangers in My Heart	Ichikawa's mother		

=== Film ===
List of voice performances in film
Year	Title	Role	Notes	Source
1995	Legend of Crystania	Reifan		
1996–97	GeGeGe no Kitaro films	Neko Musume	from 4th TV series	
1998	Welcome to Lodoss Island!	Fianna		
1998	Maze Bakunetsu Jikuu: Tenpen Kyoui no Giant	Randy		
1998–2015	Pokémon films	Junsa, Waniniko, Achamo, Eevee, others	starting with Pokémon: The First Movie	
1999	Cyber Team in Akihabara: Summer Vacation of 2011	Uzura Kitaurawa		
1999	Kindaichi Case Files: Satsuriku no Deep Blue	那国 Mikokin 那国巫琴		
2001	Go! Anpanman: Gomira's Star	Green pepper		
2005	Air	Kanna		
2005	Detective Conan: Strategy Above the Depths	Natsuho Tsujimoto		
2007	Bleach: The DiamondDust Rebellion	Kiyone Kotetsu		
2009	Pyu to Fuku! Jaguar: Ima, Fuki ni Yukimasu	Beauty Tamura		
2009	Duel Masters: Lunatic God Saga	Yu Fua		
2012	Pretty Cure All Stars New Stage: Friends of the Future	Reika Aoki (Cure Beauty)		
2012	Jewelpet the Movie: Sweets Dance Princess	Sweets Queen		
2012	Smile PreCure! The Movie: Big Mismatch in a Picture Book!	Reika Aoki (Cure Beauty)		
2013	Pretty Cure All Stars New Stage 2: Friends of the Heart	Reika Aoki (Cure Beauty)		
2015	Pretty Cure All Stars: Spring Carnival♪	Reika Aoki (Cure Beauty)		
2015	Tamayura ~Sotsugyō Shashin~ series	Mutsuko Shimokamiyama		
2015	Aria the Avvenire	President Aria Pokoteng		
2018	Hugtto! PreCure Futari wa Pretty Cure: All Stars Memories	Reika Aoki (Cure Beauty)		

=== Video games ===
List of voice performances in video games
Year	Title	Role	Notes	Source
1993	Princess Maker 2	Daughter		
1995–98	Galaxy Fraulein Yuna games	Fake Yuna, Miki Shiratori		
1996	Guardian Recall	Opening Theme "Little Angel"	PS1	
1996–97	True Love Story	Misaki みさき	Also Remember My Heart in 1997	
1997	GeGeGe no Kitaro	Neko Musume	PS1	
1998	Mitsumete Knight	Carol Parekki キャロル・パレッキー	PS1 / PS2	
1998	Variable Geo series	Tamao Mitsurugi		
1999	Virgin Fleet	Komachi Kusatsuzuki	PS1	
1999	Arc the Lad III	Cheryl Red シェリル・レッド	PS1 / PS2	
1999	Gate Keepers	Feng Fei Ling	PS1 / PS2	
2001–07	Air	Kanna		
2004	Atelier Iris: Eternal Mana	Lita Blanchimont	PS1 / PS2	
2004–05	Zatch Bell!	Koko		
2006–07	Aria games	Aria Pokoteng		
2010	GA Geijutsuka Art Design Class: Slapstick Wonder Land	Yoshino Koshino	PSP	
2012	Smile Pretty Cure! Let's Go! Fairy tale world	Reikai Aoki (Cure Beauty)	3DS	

=== Drama CD ===
List of voice performances in drama CDs
Title	Role	Notes	Source
Determination of Arc the Lad III Mercia	Sheryl Red		
Battle Skipper	Saori		
Clock Tower	Jennifer		
Earthian	Miyuki		
Galaxy Fraulein Yuna	Miki Shiratori		
Gunparade March	Seika Mori		
Idol Project	Announcer girl		
My Dear Marie	Lily		
Sorcerer on the Rocks	Kiss		
Twilight Syndrome	Chisato		
Virus Buster Serge	Erika		

=== Other dubbing ===
List of voice performances in other dubbing
Title	Role	Notes	Source
Caravan of Courage: An Ewok Adventure	Catarine Towani		
Hello Kitty's Furry Tale Theater	My Melody		
The Powerpuff Girls	Princess Morbucks	After Episode 49	

=== Live-action ===
Year	Title	Role	Notes	Source
2024	Dear Radiance	Myōbu	Taiga drama	
